= WWE Hall of Fame (2021) =

WWE Hall of Fame induction ceremony

- Promotional poster featuring various WWE Hall of Famers
- Promotion: WWE
- Date: March 30 and April 1, 2021 (aired April 6, 2021)
- City: St. Petersburg, Florida
- Venue: WWE Thunderdome at Tropicana Field

WWE Hall of Fame chronology
← Previous; 2019	Next → 2022

The 2021 WWE Hall of Fame was a professional wrestling event produced by WWE that featured the induction of the 21st and 22nd classes to the WWE Hall of Fame. Due to the COVID-19 pandemic, the 2020 Hall of Fame ceremony did not occur—as a result, the originally announced Class of 2020 was inducted alongside the Class of 2021 at the 2021 induction ceremony. The event was taped on March 30 and April 1, 2021, at the WWE ThunderDome, hosted at Tropicana Field in St. Petersburg, Florida, and aired on April 6 on Peacock in the United States and the WWE Network internationally. Jerry Lawler served as the host for the Class of 2020 portion of the show while Corey Graves and Kayla Braxton were the hosts for the Class of 2021 portion.

== Background ==
The 2020 WWE Hall of Fame ceremony was originally scheduled to take place on April 2, 2020, from the Amalie Arena in Tampa, Florida, as part of WrestleMania 36 week, and would have aired live on the WWE Network. However, the event was postponed due to the COVID-19 pandemic. On August 27, 2020, it was announced that the 2020 Class would be inducted alongside the Class of 2021 during WrestleMania 37 week; WrestleMania 37 itself was relocated to Tampa from its original location of Los Angeles, California. It was later confirmed that the 2021 ceremony would take place at the WWE ThunderDome at Tropicana Field in St. Petersburg, Florida. The event was pre-taped on March 30 and April 1 to air on April 6 on Peacock's WWE Network channel in the United States and on the standard WWE Network internationally. Fan reactions for the ThunderDome's virtual fans were also filmed ahead of time. There were no inductors for the Hall of Fame recipients. Instead, Jerry Lawler, Corey Graves, and Kayla Braxton hosted the show—with Lawler hosting the 2020 portion of the show and Graves and Braxton hosting the 2021 portion—and short video packages were played before the inductees made a short speech, which was limited to five minutes.

The first inductees for the 2020 Class of the WWE Hall of Fame were announced on December 9, 2019. The first of these was the New World Order (nWo). The members recognized for this induction were "Hollywood" Hulk Hogan, Kevin Nash, Scott Hall, and Sean Waltman. This induction made each of these members two-time inductees, with Hogan, Hall, and Nash previously being inducted for their individual careers and Waltman being previously inducted as part of D-Generation X in 2019, which also made Waltman the first back-to-back inductee. The next inductees were announced during Alexa Bliss' segment of "A Moment of Bliss" on the February 21, 2020, episode of SmackDown, where she announced that The Bella Twins (Brie Bella and Nikki Bella) would be inducted into the 2020 Class. This was followed up on the March 3 episode of WWE Backstage, where it was announced that John "Bradshaw" Layfield would be inducted. On the March 12 episode of the WWE After the Bell podcast, host Corey Graves revealed that The British Bulldog would be inducted posthumously, while on March 16, WWE and Yahoo! Japan announced that Japanese wrestler Jushin "Thunder" Liger would be inducted. On March 30, 2021, William Shatner was announced as an inductee into the Celebrity Wing of the Hall of Fame; Shatner was announced as part of the Class of 2020 instead of 2021 as he was originally intended to be inducted in 2020. On March 31, Fightful Select reported that Titus O'Neil received the 2020 Warrior Award during the 2021 induction ceremony as he was also originally intended to be inducted in 2020.

On March 10, 2021, Molly Holly was announced as the first inductee into the Class of 2021. Her announcement as the first inductee was made on WWE The Bump by her former tag team partner, The Hurricane. Eric Bischoff was announced as the next inductee into the 2021 Class during the WWE After the Bell podcast on March 18. According to Sean Waltman, the original idea was to induct Bischoff as a surprise member of nWo in 2020. On March 24, Kane and The Great Khali were announced as the next inductees into the 2021 Class, with Kane's announcement made by The Undertaker on WWE The Bump and Khali's made by Ranjin Singh on WWE Now India. On March 23, Fightful's Sean Ross Sapp reported that Rob Van Dam (RVD) would be inducted as part of the 2021 Class. Sabu, who worked with RVD in both Extreme Championship Wrestling and WWE, also affirmed this report. RVD's induction was officially confirmed by WWE via Fox Sports on March 29. On April 4, Dave Meltzer of the Wrestling Observer Newsletter reported that Ozzy Osbourne was inducted as the 2021 celebrity inductee. On April 6, it was confirmed that long-time WWE employee Rich Hering would receive the 2021 Warrior Award.

On December 9, 2019, Batista had been announced as an inductee into the 2020 Class of the Hall of Fame. Prior to the 2021 event, however, his induction was retracted. Fightful Select reported that WWE wanted Batista to be inducted "when a full crowd can enjoy it." Batista himself posted to Twitter, confirming his removal, citing previous obligations as a reason for why he could not attend the 2021 event. He also said that WWE honored his request to induct him at a future ceremony.

== Inductees ==
=== 2020 ===
==== Individual ====
Image	Ring name (Birth Name)	WWE recognized accolades
	John "Bradshaw" Layfield	One-time WWE Champion; One-time WWE Intercontinental Champion; One-time WWE United States Champion; Three-time WWF Tag Team Champion; One-time WWE European Champion; 18-time WWE Hardcore Champion; 2013 Slammy Award winner for Favorite Web Show of the Year (with Michael Cole and Renee Young); Longtime commentator and creator of WWE's Tribute to the Troops series.
	The British Bulldog (David Smith)	Posthumous inductee: Represented by his ex-wife Diana, his son Harry and his daughter Georgia; One-time WWF Intercontinental Champion; Inaugural, two-time and longest reigning WWF European Champion; Two-time WWF Hardcore Champion; Two-time WWF World Tag Team Champion.
	Jushin "Thunder" Liger (Keiichi Yamada)	Accepted via video message 11-time IWGP Junior Heavyweight Champion; One-time WCW Light Heavyweight Champion; Considered by WWE to be one of the most revolutionary competitors in sports-entertainment history.

==== Group ====
- Class headliners appear in **boldface**

Image	Group	WWE recognized accolades
From top left to bottom right: "Hollywood" Hulk Hogan, Kevin Nash, Scott Hall, and Sean Waltman	**New World Order**	One of the most famous stables in World Championship Wrestling (WCW) during the Monday Night Wars, generally believed to be the primary catalyst behind WCW Monday Nitro's success and 83 consecutive ratings victories over WWF Monday Night Raw. "Hollywood" Hulk Hogan and Kevin Nash each held the WCW World Heavyweight Championship while part of the stable, while Scott Hall was a two-time WCW United States Heavyweight Champion. Hall and Nash, also known as The Outsiders, held the WCW World Tag Team Championship six-times. Sean Waltman, then known as "Syxx", was a one-time WCW Cruiserweight Champion and was also co-champion during one of The Outsiders' WCW World Tag Team Championship reigns under the Freebird Rule.
From top left to bottom right: "Hollywood" Hulk Hogan, Kevin Nash, Scott Hall, and Sean Waltman	"Hollywood" Hulk Hogan (Terry Bollea) – Two-time inductee. Previously inducted in 2005 for his individual career. Kevin Nash – Two-time inductee. Previously inducted in 2015 for his individual career. Scott Hall – Two-time inductee. Previously inducted as "Razor Ramon" in 2014 for his individual career. Sean Waltman – Two-time inductee. Previously inducted as "X-Pac" in 2019 as a member of D-Generation X.	
Nikki (left) and Brie (right) Bella	The Bella Twins	2006 WWE Diva Search finalists 2013 Diva of the Year Slammy Award winners (won jointly) Gained fame as mainstream celebrities after starring in the WWE produced reality shows Total Divas and spin-off Total Bellas.
Nikki (left) and Brie (right) Bella	Nikki Bella (Stephanie Garcia-Colace) – Two-time and longest reigning WWE Divas Champion, 2015 Diva of the Year Slammy Award winner. Brie Bella (Brianna Danielson) – One-time WWE Divas Champion, 2013 and 2014 Couple of the Year Slammy Award winner (with Daniel Bryan). In 2026, she won the WWE Women's Tag Team Championship.	

==== Celebrity ====
Image	Recipient (Birth name)	Occupation	Notes
	William Shatner	Actor	Accepted via video message Made numerous appearances on WWE programming, including serving as a Raw guest host in 2010 and a narrator for the WWE Network reality series Breaking Ground.

==== Warrior Award ====
Image	Recipient(Birth name)	Notes
	Titus O'Neil (Thaddeus Bullard Sr.)	Global Ambassador of WWE; One-time WWE Tag Team Champion; One-time and inaugural WWE 24/7 Champion; Warrior Award recipient in honor of his charitable work, especially in his hometown of Tampa, Florida.

==== Legacy ====
Image	Recipient (Birth name)	Notes
	Ray Stevens (Carl Stevens)	One-time WWWF United States Heavyweight Champion; Four-time AWA World Tag Team Champion; Eight-time NWA World Tag Team Champion; One-time NWA Mid-Atlantic Heavyweight Champion; Ten-time NWA United States Heavyweight Champion/AWA United States Heavyweight Champion; Two-time IWA Heavyweight Champion; One-time IWA World Tag Team Heavyweight Champion.
—N/a	Brickhouse Brown (Frederick Seawright)	One-time AWA Southern Heavyweight Champion; One-time CWA Heavyweight Champion; One-time NWA Texas Heavyweight Champion; Three-time USWA Television Champion; One-time USWA World Tag Team Champion.
	"Dr. Death" Steve Williams (Steven Williams)	One-time AJPW Triple Crown Heavyweight Champion and the third Gaijin to win the title Eight-time AJPW World Tag Team Champion; One-time IWA Japan/W*ING World Tag Team Champion; Two-time WCW World Tag Team Champion; One-time NWA World Tag Team Champion; One-time NWA Mid-Atlantic Heavyweight Champion; One-time WCW United States Tag Team Champion; Three-time UWF World Tag Team Champion/Mid-South Tag Team Champion; One-time UWF Heavyweight Champion; One-time UWF SportsChannel Television Champion; One-time UWF Heavyweight Champion
	Baron Michele Leone (Michele Leone)	One-time Los Angeles World Heavyweight Champion; One-time NWA World Junior Heavyweight Champion; Two-time NWA Pacific Coast Heavyweight Champion.
	Gary Hart (Gary Williams)	One-time NWA American Tag Team Champion; Longtime manager and executive for World Class Championship Wrestling.

=== 2021 ===
==== Individual ====
- Class headliners appear in **boldface**

Image	Ring name (Birth Name)	WWE recognized accolades
	Molly Holly (Nora Benshoof)	Two-time WWE Women's Champion; One-time WWF Hardcore Champion
	Eric Bischoff	Former Executive Producer and later Senior Vice President of World Championship Wrestling (WCW), who led WCW to an 83-consecutive week ratings win over WWE (then WWF) during the Monday Night Wars; Also one-time WCW Hardcore Champion; First General Manager for WWE's Raw brand Creator of the Elimination Chamber match and Raw Roulette (wrestlers spun a roulette wheel to determine the stipulation of their match; used six times over the course of 2002–2013).
	**Kane** (Glenn Jacobs)	One-time WWF Champion; One-time World Heavyweight Champion; One-time ECW Champion; Two-time WWF/WWE Intercontinental Champion; One-time WWF Hardcore Champion; One-time WWE 24/7 Champion; Two-time WWE Tag Team Champion; Nine-time World Tag Team Champion; One-time WCW Tag Team Champion; SmackDown's 2010 Money in the Bank winner Two-time Slammy Award winner ("Best Family Values" in 2010 for beating up Jack Swagger and "Match of the Year" in 2014 for the Survivor Series elimination match); Most cumulative Royal Rumble match eliminations at 46 (with 11 of them coming in 2001, which was the single-Rumble record for thirteen years); Most Royal Rumble match appearances at 20.
	The Great Khali (Dalip Singh Rana)	Accepted via video message One-time World Heavyweight Champion, which made him the first Indian world champion in WWE; 2008 Slammy Award winner for "Damn!" Moment of the Year (hosting the Kiss Cam on the November 7 episode of SmackDown).
	Rob Van Dam (Robert Szatkowski)	One-time WWE Champion; One-time ECW World Heavyweight Champion; Six-time WWF/WWE Intercontinental Champion; Four-time WWF/E Hardcore Champion; One-time WWE European Champion (and the last Hardcore and European Champion); One-time WWE Tag Team Champion; Two-time World Tag Team Champion; One-time ECW World Television Champion; Two-time ECW World Tag Team Champion; 2006 Money in the Bank winner.

==== Celebrity ====
Image	Recipient (Birth name)	Occupation	Notes
	Ozzy Osbourne (John Osbourne)	Musician	Accepted via video message Made multiple appearances for WWE, notably appearing at WrestleMania 2, performing at a SmackDown taping in 2007, and serving as a guest co-host of Raw in 2009.

==== Warrior Award ====
Recipient (Birth name)	Notes
Rich Hering	Senior Vice President of Government Relations and Risk Management; More than 50 years working for WWE, he helped expand the company from a regional to a worldwide promotion.

==== Legacy ====
Image	Recipient (Birth name)	Notes
	Dick the Bruiser (William Afflis)	One-time AWA World Heavyweight Champion; One-time World Heavyweight Champion (NWA in Omaha, Nebraska); Five-time AWA World Tag Team Champion; One-time AWA United States Heavyweight Champion; One-time WWA World Heavyweight Champion (Los Angeles version); 13-time WWA World Heavyweight Champion (Indianapolis version); 15-time WWA World Tag Team Champion; One-time NWA International Tag Team Champion; One-time NWA World Tag Team Champion; Three-time NWA Missouri Heavyweight Champion; Six-time NWA United States Heavyweight Champion
	"Pistol" Pez Whatley (Pezavan Whatley)	Two-time NWA Southern Heavyweight Champion; Two-time NWA Western States Tag Team Champion; One-time NWA Mid-America Tag Team Champion.
	Buzz Sawyer (Bruce Woyan)	One-time AWA Southern Heavyweight Champion; One-time NWA National Heavyweight Champion; Two-time NWA National Tag Team Champion; One-time NWA Mid-Atlantic Tag Team Champion; One-time Mid-South North American Heavyweight Champion; One-time UWF Television Champion; One-time WCWA Television Champion; One-time WCWA Texas Heavyweight Champion; One-time WCWA World Tag Team Champion
—N/a	Ethel Johnson (Ethel Hairston)	One-time NWA World Women's Tag Team Champion.
—N/a	Paul Boesch	Promoter of Houston Wrestling.
