= WWE Hall of Fame (2013) =

WWE Hall of Fame induction ceremony

- Promotion: WWE
- Date: April 6, 2013
- City: New York City, New York
- Venue: Madison Square Garden

WWE Hall of Fame chronology
← Previous; 2012	Next → 2014

WWE Hall of Fame (2013) was the event which featured the introduction of the 14th class to the WWE Hall of Fame. The event was produced by WWE on April 6, 2013, from Madison Square Garden in New York City, New York. The event took place the same weekend as WrestleMania 29. The event was hosted by Jerry Lawler. A condensed one-hour version of the ceremony aired on the USA Network the following Tuesday. In March 2015, the ceremony was added to the WWE Network.

== Background ==
After leaving the WWF (now WWE), Sammartino became an outspoken critic of the path on which Vince McMahon has taken professional wrestling. He particularly criticised the use of steroids and "vulgar" storylines. In 2013, Sammartino accepted an invitation for induction into the Hall of Fame, after having declined several times in prior years. He finally accepted the offer to join because he was satisfied with the way the company had addressed his concerns about the direction of the business. In April 2018, Sean Waltman announced on his podcast, that should Sammartino not have accepted the invitation to be inducted, D-Generation X would have been inducted.

== Event ==
Mick Foley was inducted by his long time friend Terry Funk. The two discussed all their times on the road together which included time at WWE, World Championship Wrestling and Extreme Championship Wrestling. Foley also said that he had regrets from his career. The main one was that he never beat Chris Jericho. Jericho then ran up on the stage, laid down, and told Foley to pin him. Foley originally acted like he couldn't and was walking away when he ran back and dropped an elbow on Jericho. He then pinned Jericho and CM Punk counted the one-two-three, jokingly giving Foley his first victory over Jericho.

Bob Backlund was inducted by Maria Menounos.

Trish Stratus was inducted by Stephanie McMahon. During Stratus' speech she announced that she was expecting her first child, a son, later in 2013.

Vince McMahon inducted businessman and future U.S. president Donald Trump. Vince spoke of Trump and their working relationship during WrestleMania IV and WrestleMania V, as well as the "Battle of the Billionaires" at WrestleMania 23.

Booker T was inducted by his brother Stevie Ray, whom he had teamed together with for many years as Harlem Heat. Booker T later admitted during an interview with John Layfield, on his show Legends with JBL on the WWE Network, that prior to him asking Stevie Ray to induct him, that the brothers had not spoken in nearly 5 years.

The final inductee of the evening was Bruno Sammartino who was inducted by Arnold Schwarzenegger. Although Sammartino saw great success in New York City during his career, this event marked Sammartino's return to the WWE after 25 years. It was just the second time in Hall of Fame history that Vince McMahon would be seen on camera, after 2009 when he inducted Stone Cold Steve Austin.

== Aftermath ==
Sammartino appeared on the October 7, 2013, episode of Raw and received a birthday greeting in his hometown of Pittsburgh. On March 28, 2015, Sammartino inducted Larry Zbyszko into the Hall of Fame class of 2015.

== Inductees ==
=== Individual ===
- Class headliners appear in **boldface**

Image	Ring name (Birth Name)	Inducted by	WWE recognized accolades
	Mick Foley	Terry Funk	Wrestled using various ring names, namely Cactus Jack, Mankind and Dude Love; Three-time WWF Champion; Eight-time WWF Tag Team Champion; Two-time ECW World Tag Team Champion; One-time WCW World Tag Team Champion; First WWF Hardcore Champion
	Bob Backlund	Maria Menounos	Two-time WWWF/WWF World Heavyweight Champion (technically held it three times but WWE recognizes his first two reigns during the late 70s and early 80s as one continuous one); One-time WWF Tag Team Champion
	Trish Stratus (Patricia Stratigeas)	Stephanie McMahon	A record Seven-time WWF/E Women's Champion; One-time WWF Hardcore Champion; Three-time WWE Babe of the Year; Voted Diva of the Decade during the Raw 10th Anniversary special
	Booker T (Booker T. Huffman Jr.)	Stevie Ray	Five-time WCW World Heavyweight Champion; One-time World Heavyweight Champion; A record six-time WCW World Television Champion; Four-time WWF/WWE United States (Heavyweight) Champion; One-time WWE Intercontinental Champion; Two-time WWF Hardcore Champion; Three-time World Tag Team Champion; A record 11-time WCW World Tag Team Champion (10 of which came with his brother Stevie Ray as Harlem Heat); 2006 King of the Ring winner
	**Bruno Sammartino**	Arnold Schwarzenegger	Two-time WWWF World Heavyweight Champion/WWWF Heavyweight Champion; Holds the records for longest consecutive and cumulative reigns of seven and 11 years, respectively

=== Celebrity ===
Image	Recipient (Birth name)	Occupation	Inducted by	Appearances
	Donald Trump	Businessman; Reality TV host/Producer	Vince McMahon	Hosted WrestleManias IV and V at Trump Plaza; Faced Vince McMahon in the "Battle of the Billionaires" at WrestleMania 23; Briefly became the owner of Raw in 2009
