= Connor Michalek =

American cancer victim (2005–2014)

Connor "The Crusher" Michalek
- Michalek in 2012
- Born: 2005
- Died: April 25, 2014 (aged 8)
- Cause of death: Medulloblastoma
- Other names: The Crusher; Stone Crusher
- Parents: Steve Michalek; Brittany Caligiuri

Connor "The Crusher" Michalek (2005 – April 25, 2014) was an American WWE fan who received considerable media attention after a social media campaign was made for him to meet Daniel Bryan, his favorite professional wrestler. He later met Bryan and other WWE performers a number of times. Michalek, who had cancer of the spine and brain since he was three years old, died aged eight on April 25, 2014. WWE executives Triple H and Stephanie McMahon subsequently named the Connor's Cure charity in his honor, and he posthumously received the inaugural Warrior Award at the 2015 WWE Hall of Fame ceremony.

== Biography ==
Connor Michalek was born in 2005, the son of Brittany Caligiuri and Steve Michalek. He had a younger brother named Jackson, and lived with his family in Hampton Township, Pennsylvania. A fan of WWE, he was also known by his wrestling-inspired nicknames "Stone Crusher" and "The Crusher". He developed medulloblastoma in September 2009, when he was three years old. After his diagnosis, he underwent several surgeries and many rounds of chemotherapy. At one point, he developed PHACE syndrome and had to relearn how to speak and walk, but the cancer remained stable until May 2011. He subsequently began a clinical trial of chemotherapy and treatments but doctors gave him close to a zero percent chance of surviving due to surgery not being an option and having exceeded his lifetime amount of radiation to the brain and spine.

In October 2012, a video featuring Michalek asking to meet his hero, WWE professional wrestler Daniel Bryan, was posted to YouTube and received attention from media outlets. A social media campaign ensued, with hundreds of people joining a Facebook group titled "Help Connor meet Daniel Bryan". Within 48 hours, WWE chairman and CEO Vince McMahon stated that Michalek would meet Bryan. Michalek met Bryan on December 18, 2012, and again on October 7, 2013, when WWE held events in Pittsburgh. While attending the 2014 Royal Rumble, Michalek and his family became acquainted with WWE ring announcer Justin Roberts, who maintained a friendship with Michalek and introduced him to other WWE personalities. Upon learning that Michalek had little time to live, WWE invited him to attend the WrestleMania XXX festivities. Before their Raw event in the week prior to WrestleMania, they had Michalek perform a ring entrance with Bryan and playfully score a pinfall victory over Triple H while WWE performers cheered him on. During WrestleMania XXX on April 6, 2014, Michalek was in the front row to see Bryan win the WWE World Heavyweight Championship in the main event. Bryan embraced Michalek immediately following his victory.

On April 25, 2014, Michalek died aged eight.

== Posthumous WWE Hall of Famer ==
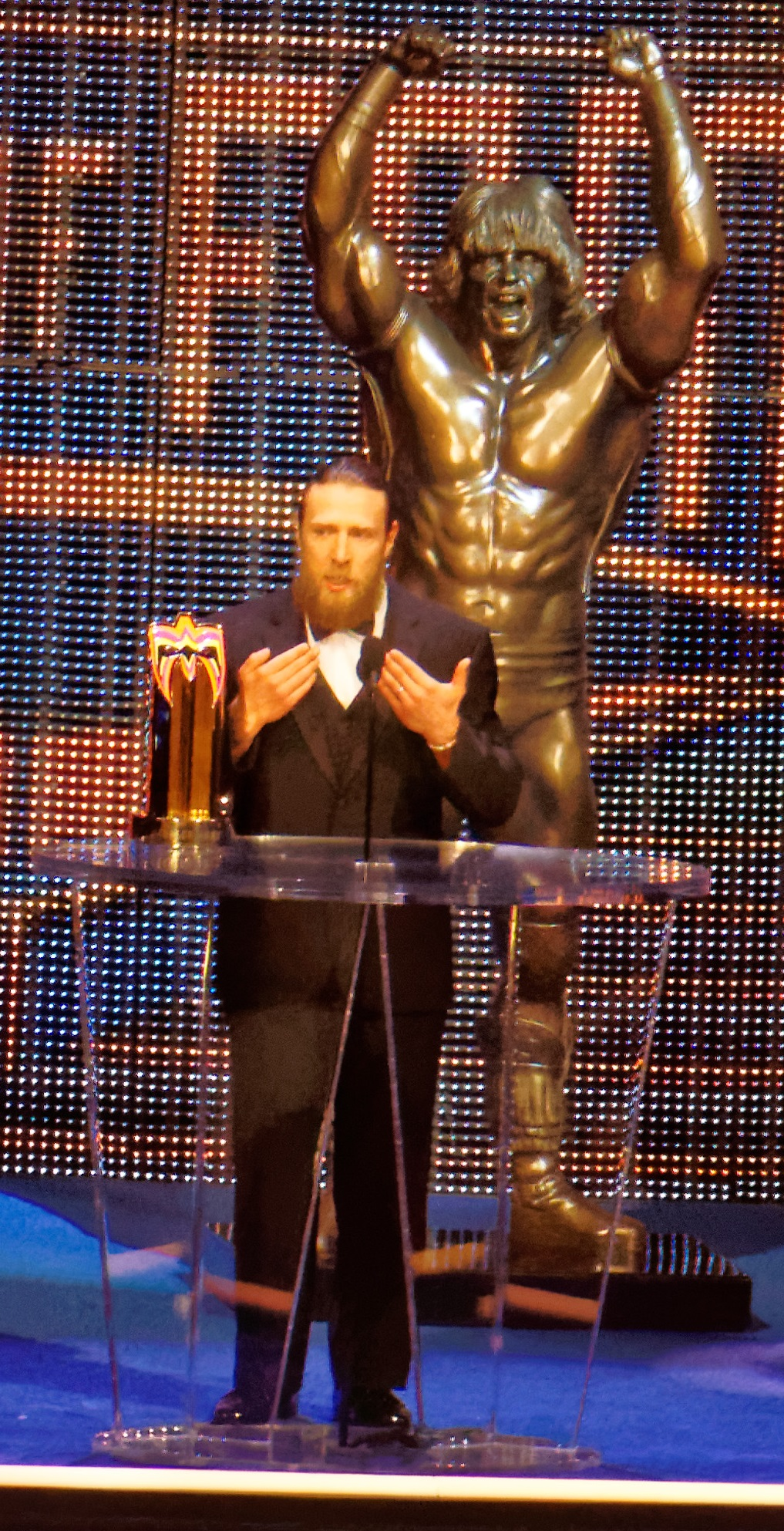
Daniel Bryan presents the Warrior Award at the 2015 WWE Hall of Fame ceremony

Following Michalek's death, WWE released a video in his memory, which went viral, featuring him interacting with numerous WWE personnel during WrestleMania XXX weekend.

On March 9, 2015, WWE announced that Michalek would be honored with the inaugural Warrior Award at the 2015 WWE Hall of Fame induction ceremony. According to WWE, the Warrior Award is given to individuals who have "exhibited unwavering strength and perseverance, and who lives life with the courage and compassion that embodies the indomitable spirit of the Ultimate Warrior". Daniel Bryan and Dana Warrior presented the award on March 28, and his father and brother accepted it on his behalf.

=== Response ===
Stephanie McMahon
(@StephMcMahon)
tweeted:

philanthropy is the future of marketing, it's the way brands r going 2 win" -@biz Stone co-founder @twitter #WWEBPS

March 28, 2015

Justin Roberts, who was instrumental in getting Michalek to meet his favorite wrestlers, wrote an article questioning whether his Hall of Fame induction by WWE was "driven by sincerity and not strategy". He also wrote in detail about WWE's relationship with Michalek, including his own involvement as the initial point-contact with Michalek's family. Roberts, who had left WWE several months prior, was driven to write the article after reading a tweet by Stephanie McMahon made on the same day as Michalek's posthumous receiving of the Warrior Award, which as analyzed by PWInsider "raises questions about the company's reasoning for their community outreach" despite Roberts's love of "the company [having] inducted Michalek into their Hall of Fame".

Michalek's father responded to Roberts by tweeting that "regardless of what said, [Roberts] loved Connor and we love him. That's what counts. I will never [forget] all he did for Connor, and now me." A second tweet displayed pictures of Roberts together with Michalek, with the caption that "this is what counts, [let's] please remember. Actions that bring smiles, like these [Roberts] gave." WWE responded to Roberts in a statement, stating that it was "offensive to suggest that WWE and its executives had anything but altruistic intentions in honoring Connor and his legacy with The Warrior Award". WWE also highlighted in their statement their other partnerships for social causes, including Paul Levesque and Stephanie McMahon's Connor's Cure fund for pediatric cancer research and US$1.5 million in funds raised for Susan G. Komen for the Cure. David Bixenspan of Wrestling Observer Newsletter wrote that WWE's statement "really doesn't address much of what Roberts said, for whatever it's worth".

== Connor's Cure ==
In June 2014, Paul Levesque and Stephanie McMahon founded Connor's Cure in Michalek's memory, a non-profit charitable organization for pediatric cancer research, which they have personally funded through Children's Hospital of Pittsburgh Foundation. In their response to Roberts's criticisms in April 2015, WWE stated Connor's Cure "already raised more than $200,000". The organization reportedly had raised more than $630,000 by September 2015, and nearly $1 million by March 2016, having helped more than 100 families. WWE began partnering with The V Foundation, a foundation for cancer research created by late sports broadcaster Jim Valvano, in 2016.

In 2025, McMahon and Levesque appeared at the White House alongside President Donald Trump during the signing of an executive order on artificial intelligence in children's healthcare. During the event, McMahon discussed Connor's Cure and her experiences with Michalek in remarks at the Oval Office.

== Awards and accomplishments ==
- WWE
  - WWE Hall of Fame (Class of 2015 - Warrior Award)

== See also ==
- List of people with brain tumors
