= Paul Bearer =

American professional wrestling manager (1954–2013)

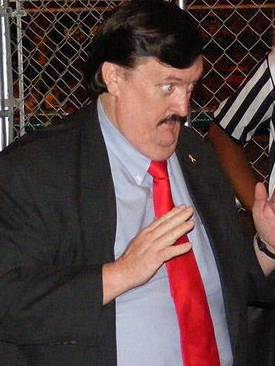
- Moody in 2011

Personal information
- Born: William Alvin Moody; April 10, 1954 Mobile, Alabama, U.S.
- Died: March 5, 2013 (aged 58) Mobile, Alabama, U.S.
- Education: San Antonio College; University of South Alabama
- Spouse: Dianna McDole (m. 1978; died 2009)
- Children: 2

Professional wrestling career
- Ring name(s): The Masked Embalmer; Mr. X Dr. Rigor Mortis; Percival Pringle III; Percy Pringle III; Paul Bearer
- Billed height: 5 ft 11 in (180 cm)
- Debut: June 1974
- Military service
- Allegiance: United States
- Branch: United States Air Force
- Service years: 1972–1976
- Rank: Sergeant
- Unit: Keesler Air Force Base
- Awards: Air Force Good Conduct Medal

William Alvin Moody (April 10, 1954 – March 5, 2013) was an American professional wrestling manager. He performed in the World Wrestling Federation (WWF, later WWE) under the ring name and gimmick of Paul Bearer, (Note: A play on the word "pallbearer") manager of The Undertaker, as well as the storyline father of Undertaker's storyline half-brother, Kane.

== Early life ==
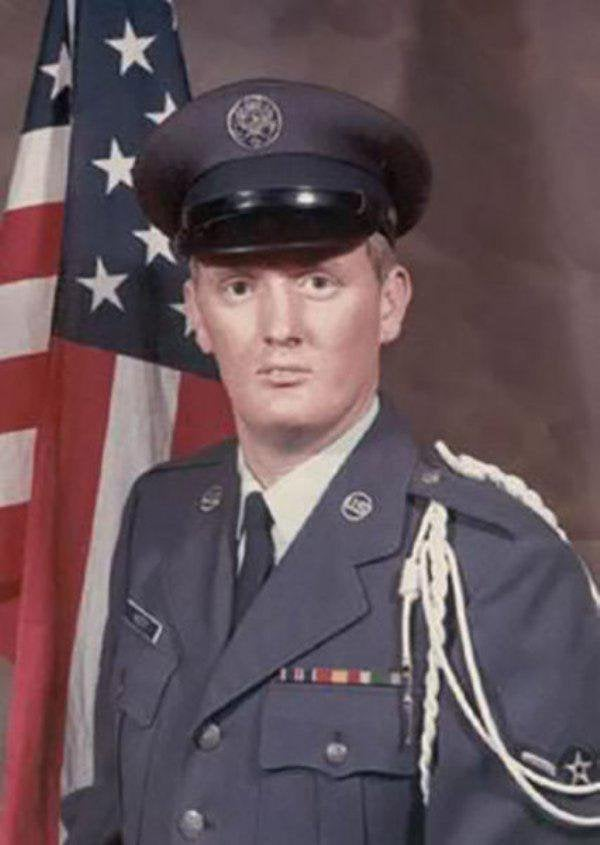
Moody during his time in the United States Air Force in the 1970s.

Moody was born in Mobile, Alabama, on April 10, 1954, and attended San Antonio College and the University of South Alabama.

== Professional wrestling career ==
=== Early career (1974–1990) ===
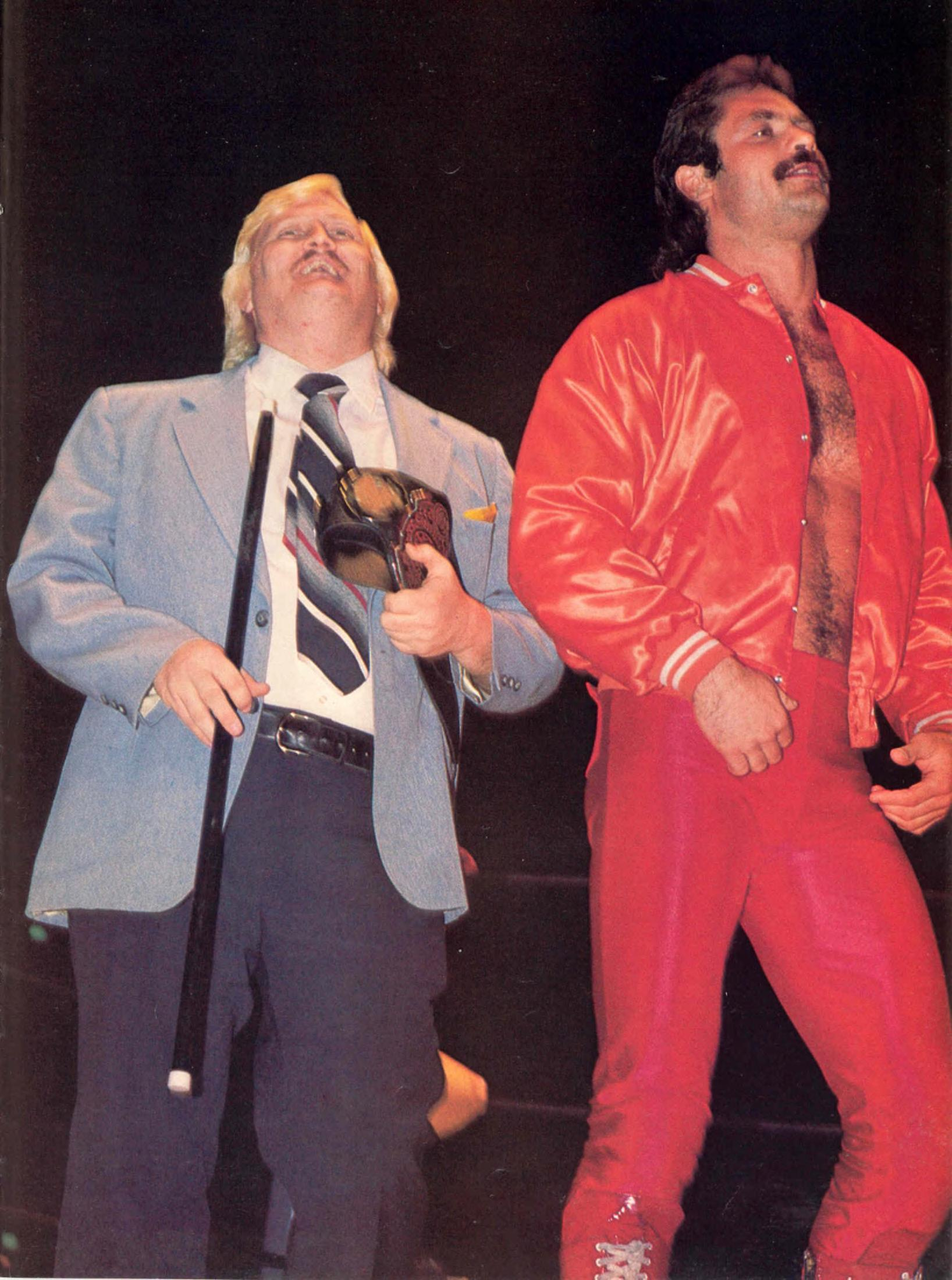
Percy Pringle III managing Rick Rude in 1985

Moody entered professional wrestling in his teenage years as a ringside photographer. After high school, he enlisted in the United States Air Force, serving four years on duty; during this time, he often wrestled for independent promotions during off-duty hours.

In 1979, Moody began managing as Percival "Percy" Pringle III in southeastern independent promotions; a few years earlier, in June 1974, he wrestled as Mr. X. There had been previous Percy Pringles in wrestling who were not William Moody. He was given the name by booker Frankie Cain. Immediately after his first son's birth, he cut back his involvement in the wrestling business in order to obtain a degree in mortuary science and earn certification as an embalmer and mortician.

In 1984, he resumed full-time involvement in the wrestling business, using his Pringle character in Championship Wrestling from Florida and World Class Championship Wrestling in Texas. During this time, he was WCCW's answer to Bobby Heenan by doing "Heenan"-like promos, even looking like Heenan as well with the blonde hair and attire. He served as manager for numerous wrestlers; he notably managed Rick Rude, "Stunning" Steve Austin, and Mark Calaway in their early careers. As Percy Pringle, he was also associated with the careers of Lex Luger, Eric Embry, and Dingo Warrior. Warrior turned babyface after falling out with fellow Pringle proteges Buzz Sawyer and Matt Borne following a six-man tag defeat in 1986.

=== World Wrestling Federation / World Wrestling Entertainment (1990–2002) ===
==== Managing The Undertaker (1990–1996) ====
Moody joined the World Wrestling Federation (WWF) on December 22, 1990, after being mentioned by Rick Rude to WWF owner Vince McMahon. McMahon used Moody's real-life involvement in the funeral industry to create the character of Paul Bearer, a name given to him by Road Warrior Hawk and a play on the term pallbearer. In his portrayal of a very histrionic, ghostly manager, Bearer regularly communicated in his shaky, high-pitched, wailing voice and was almost always seen bearing an urn, which led to his mantra, "the power of the urn," allowing his main protégé The Undertaker to revive strength. His keeper-of-the-urn gimmick led to several storylines in which The Undertaker's antagonists stole his urn, causing The Undertaker to lose much of his supernatural strength. Bearer's leading catch phrase was "Ohhhh, yes!"

Moody made his first appearance in February 1991, as a heel, when Brother Love, who originally managed The Undertaker, delegated Bearer to take on the role of The Undertaker's manager. Complementing The Undertaker's Deadman gimmick, Bearer took on a spooky, ghastly character. Bearer hosted his own WWF talk show segment entitled The Funeral Parlor, which included moments such as Ultimate Warrior being locked inside a casket, among others. In late 1991, Bearer managed The Undertaker to the WWF Championship when The Undertaker defeated Hulk Hogan at that year's Survivor Series, though The Undertaker would lose the title back to Hogan six days later at This Tuesday in Texas. In early 1992, The Undertaker and Bearer turned face when The Undertaker stopped former ally Jake "The Snake" Roberts from ambushing Randy Savage and Miss Elizabeth with a chair backstage; The Undertaker and Roberts had a match at WrestleMania VIII, which saw The Undertaker win.

In June 1993, Moody's contract expired and was written off television, to explain his absence on the air, Undertaker's rivals Giant Gonzales, Mr. Hughes and manager Harvey Wippleman (whose previous client Kamala had feuded with The Undertaker) attacked Undertaker and Bearer and stole the urn. Throughout the Summer of 1993, The Undertaker would appear without Bearer in his corner and in late August 1993, Moody signed a new contract with the WWF and returned at SummerSlam and got the urn back and reunited with the Undertaker.

In January 1994, The Undertaker began having back problems and requested time off, so after losing a Casket match to Yokozuna at Royal Rumble (with several other heel wrestlers getting involved), The Undertaker appeared on the videowall saying he'll be back and was lifted to the top of the arena as if he went to Heaven (Marty Jannetty was actually the one dressed as The Undertaker). The Undertaker and Paul Bearer were again written off television. Starting in the spring of 1994, fans began claiming they've seen The Undertaker in various places and even Ted DiBiase claimed he saw The Undertaker. In June 1994, Bearer appeared for the first time since Royal Rumble calling DiBiase a liar. DiBiase even brought in his own "Undertaker" and Bearer even realized that DiBiase's Undertaker was a different person and a match was set for SummerSlam for both Undertaker's to settle it in the main event. Bearer's Undertaker finally returned in a new purple attire and a larger urn was brought in. Bearer's Undertaker defeated DiBiase's Undertaker to end the feud. Afterwards Bearer's Undertaker resumed his feud with Yokozuna by defeating him in a casket match at Survivor Series with Chuck Norris as the referee.

==== Managing Mankind, The Executioner, Vader and Kane (1996–1998) ====
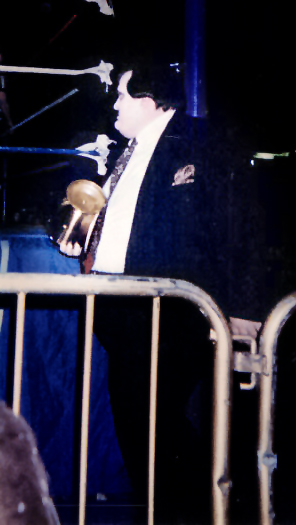
Bearer holding his urn in 1996.

For the next two years, The Undertaker continued to dominate the WWF with Bearer by his side, but by early Summer 1996, wrestling fans were getting tired of the urn giving power to the Undertaker and a change was needed. At SummerSlam, Bearer turned on his longtime protégé and aligned himself with Mankind. According to The Undertaker, the original plan was for The Undertaker and Bearer to turn heel, and Mankind was to turn face, but Undertaker refused to turn heel. According to Moody, the WWF wanted Bearer to turn on The Undertaker for him to get ready for the storyline with Kane the following year. At In Your House 11: Buried Alive, Bearer brought The Executioner and other wrestlers including Hunter Hearst-Helmsley & Crush to help Mankind and bury The Undertaker alive and Bearer managed The Executioner for two months until Bearer fired him and at Royal Rumble, Bearer became the new manager of Vader after helping him defeat The Undertaker. In April 1997 at In Your House 14: Revenge of the 'Taker, The Undertaker set Bearer's face ablaze using a fireball, which was done in retaliation for Bearer having Mankind set a fireball to The Undertaker's face several weeks prior. Resulting from The Undertaker's actions, Bearer suffered (kayfabe) burns to his face and was bandaged for a time. Once healed from the burns, Bearer changed his looks, shedding the makeup of ghostly pallor and jet-black color to his natural strawberry blond hair and less make-up. Bearer even dropped his ghostly appearance and shaved his mustache (which grew back by fall 1997) and became a loudmouth manager and began speaking in his Percy Pringle III voice.

Around mid-1997, Paul Bearer blackmailed The Undertaker (WWF Champion at the time) into being his protégé again with the ultimatum of revealing a deep, dark secret from their past. During this time, Bearer made references to the "fires of hell," likening The Undertaker's dark secret to The Undertaker's act of setting fire to his face. Under duress, The Undertaker accepted after several weeks of resistance. While "managing" The Undertaker this time around, Bearer engaged in tyrannical behaviors towards him, harassing him constantly. Eventually, The Undertaker lost his patience and refused to allow Bearer to continue being his manager, leading Bearer to reveal the secret.

The dark secret suggested that Bearer had a disturbingly traumatic past with The Undertaker which long preceded Brother Love's joining the two in January 1991. The dark secret dates back to The Undertaker's youth and involves domestic matters: Paul Bearer, while working for The Undertaker's parents as an apprentice mortician in their family funeral home business, witnessed a felony act during The Undertaker's adolescence. Bearer claimed that The Undertaker had committed an arson murder, burning down his parents' family funeral home, in the process, killing them. This act also killed The Undertaker's younger "brother"—or so The Undertaker long thought. Bearer, who claimed to be attending a mortuary science college course at the time of the fire, hid Kane in a mental asylum during the rest of Kane's youth into adulthood. At the time throughout mid to late 1997, The Undertaker denied all this, claiming it was his younger brother's fault. Bearer, blaming The Undertaker, accused him of being an "arsonist", "murderer", and "liar." (Connected to these accounts, it was later revealed approximately six months after Kane's WWF debut that he was actually the half-brother of The Undertaker. The Undertaker's mother had an affair with Bearer and, as a result, gave birth to Kane. Bearer unintentionally (kayfabe) revealed to a Raw audience that he was actually Kane's father. This came to light when Bearer informed Jerry Lawler on Monday Night Raw, at a point in which he thought cameras had stopped rolling for a commercial break but were still on. Up until that point, The Undertaker was under the impression that Kane was fully related to him and his family. Presumably, The Undertaker's deceased father lived his entire life under the same impression). Because of the fire, The Undertaker thought Kane had been dead for all those years, claiming he was a "pyromaniac", obsessed with starting fires and, due to the incident, couldn't possibly be alive. However, Bearer introduced the vengeful, fire-personified Kane in October 1997 at Badd Blood: In Your House. In this first appearance for the character, Kane cost The Undertaker a Hell in a Cell match to determine the #1 contendership for the WWF title against Shawn Michaels. This led to a bitter rivalry between The Undertaker and Kane and Bearer. Kane was not revealed as Bearer's son until April 27, 1998, on Raw is War, a day after the first Inferno Match, at Unforgiven, where Kane was set on fire. The Undertaker was shown to have also been unaware of this at that time, and helped to build the feud up further, as The Undertaker initially refused to believe the story until an in-story DNA test proved it to be true. The feud lasted into summer of 1998, when Kane seemingly abandoned Bearer to side with The Undertaker, beginning a face turn.

==== Ministry of Darkness (1998–1999) ====
Bearer and The Undertaker became a heel team again toward the end of 1998 when Bearer betrayed his own son, Kane, in favor of managing The Undertaker once again. Once becoming a heel with Bearer, The Undertaker shamelessly admitted to setting the funeral home ablaze for which he had initially claimed was an accident or blamed Kane. Shortly thereafter, Bearer (returning in early 1999 to his signature black hair and mustache, but wearing a buttoned sweater and black overcoat, without the pasty white makeup and speaking in the same voice as his 1997 predecessor) and The Undertaker formed the Ministry of Darkness. Both he and The Undertaker took a hiatus from the WWF unceremoniously in September 1999 as a result of The Undertaker suffering an injury.

==== Final appearances (2000) ====
In February 2000, Bearer, who turned face once more briefly, returned to WWF television as Kane's manager (now wearing a red overcoat), aiding and assisting his son in his war against D-Generation X (DX), but retired from on-screen performing shortly after WrestleMania 2000. Later that year, he went backstage to serve as a WWF road agent, stage manager, and talent scout. His contract with WWE ended on October 14, 2002.

=== NWA Total Nonstop Action (2002–2003) ===
Moody spent the next year working with NWA Total Nonstop Action Wrestling (NWA-TNA) under the ring name Percy Pringle III.

=== Return to WWE (2003–2013) ===
On October 3, 2003, he signed a new three-year contract with WWE. When Jim Ross contacted him about rejoining the company, Bearer at first refused the offer, but Ross then called again with an offer. At that time, he was suffering from health problems and depression related to his obesity and underwent gastric bypass surgery on November 25, 2003. As a signing bonus, WWE agreed to pay for the surgery, as Ross promised.

After recovering, he reappeared as Paul Bearer on March 14, 2004, at WrestleMania XX, alongside Undertaker in a match against Kane.

In spring of 2004, Paul Bearer was kidnapped by The Dudley Boyz under the direction of Paul Heyman; this was set up in order to temporarily write Bearer out of WWE storylines because he had to undergo emergency gallbladder surgery on May 24, 2004, after suddenly developing gallstones, a common side effect of gastric bypass surgery.

For the June 27, 2004, pay-per-view The Great American Bash, a match pitting The Undertaker against both of The Dudley Boyz was booked. Paul Bearer was encased in a glass "crypt" at ringside, covered up to his chest in cement. Heyman demanded The Undertaker throw the match or Bearer would be suffocated in cement.

The Undertaker won the match but proceeded afterwards to pull the lever that sent cement into the crypt, completely burying Paul Bearer, suffocating him. On the following week's SmackDown!, Bearer was acknowledged to be alive, although gravely injured, for storyline purposes; the rehearsal taping earlier in the day of The Great American Bash – with The Undertaker ad-libbing and only half of the stunt complete, in an empty arena – was leaked onto the internet dirt sheets and actually broadcast live by accident in many of the television markets. As he had two years remaining on his contract, however, Bearer was used as a booker for the company up until WWE decided to terminate his contract on April 11, 2005.

On June 10, 2005, Bearer announced that he had signed a new deal with WWE, allowing it to market his personality and requiring he attend autograph sessions, make promotional appearances and occasionally work television and house shows. In late January 2007, at a SmackDown!/ECW house show in Mobile, Alabama, Bearer joined The Brothers of Destruction at ringside, carrying the original urn.

On the September 24, 2010, episode of SmackDown, Bearer made his first on-screen appearance in six years after being brought out in a casket. He helped The Undertaker, who was feuding with Kane over the World Heavyweight Championship, by restoring The Undertaker's powers with the urn. Bearer officially became The Undertaker's manager again by accompanying him to the ring for his match against Kane for the title at the Hell in a Cell pay-per-view. During the match, Bearer once again turned on The Undertaker, after shining a light in his eyes when he was about to Tombstone Kane. He then let Kane hit The Undertaker with the urn to help him win. On the October 15 episode of SmackDown, Bearer challenged The Undertaker to face Kane in a Buried Alive Match for the World Heavyweight Championship at Bragging Rights, to which The Undertaker accepted by attacking Kane. At Bragging Rights, Kane once again defeated The Undertaker after interference by Bearer, who was almost thrown in the grave by The Undertaker, and The Nexus, who helped Bearer and Kane bury The Undertaker.

Kane then entered a feud with Edge, after he was named the new challenger to Kane's World Heavyweight Championship at Survivor Series. On the November 12 episode of SmackDown, Kane cost Edge his match against Nexus member David Otunga. After the match, Edge kidnapped Bearer by strapping him in a wheelchair. Later that night, Edge used Bearer to cost Kane his match against Big Show. The following week, Edge tormented Bearer throughout the night by throwing a dodgeball at him and force feeding and throwing pizza all over him. Edge then used Bearer to call for Kane in the parking lot, but Kane wasn't able to get Bearer in time as Edge attacked him and drove off with Bearer. At Survivor Series, Edge brought an empty wheelchair causing Kane to go mad frantically trying to interrogate him on where Bearer was held. Even though the match ended in a draw, Kane was unable to find Bearer as Edge wheeled his enemy into a barricade. On the November 26 episode of SmackDown, Kane demanded that Edge to let Bearer go, but Edge refused. Kane attempted to track down Bearer, but was unable to find him. Kane offered a second title shot to Edge, which he accepted, but continued to keep Bearer with him. At the end of the night, Edge lured Kane to the parking lot, where Edge drove over a dummy version of Paul Bearer, with the actual Paul Bearer in the backseat of the car. On the December 3 episode of SmackDown, Edge continued his mind games with Kane by pushing a dummy version of Paul Bearer down some stairs. Then, after Edge defeated Kane in a non-title match, he brought out a Paul Bearer lookalike. Kane then went to search for Bearer again, but Edge drove away in a truck with Bearer tied up on the back. The following week, Kane begged Edge to return Bearer, but Edge once again refused. Kane then refused to participate in the main event that night and once again searched for Bearer. After seeing what he thought was a dummy version of Paul Bearer on top of two ladders, Kane pushed them over. Afterward, Kane saw that he pushed the actual Paul Bearer off the ladders onto the concrete floor, thus, injuring him and writing him out of the storyline.

In April 2012, Bearer returned for a brief stint as a part of Kane's ongoing feud with Randy Orton. He was kidnapped by Orton and then stuck in a storage freezer while strapped to a wheelchair. Kane later came for Bearer, only to roll him back into the freezer and saying, "I'm saving you... from me". This would mark Bearer's final appearance in WWE. Bearer was advertised to reunite with The Undertaker and Kane on WWE Raw 1000 in July 2012, but could not make the event due to scheduling and travel conflicts.

=== Independent circuit (2010–2013) ===
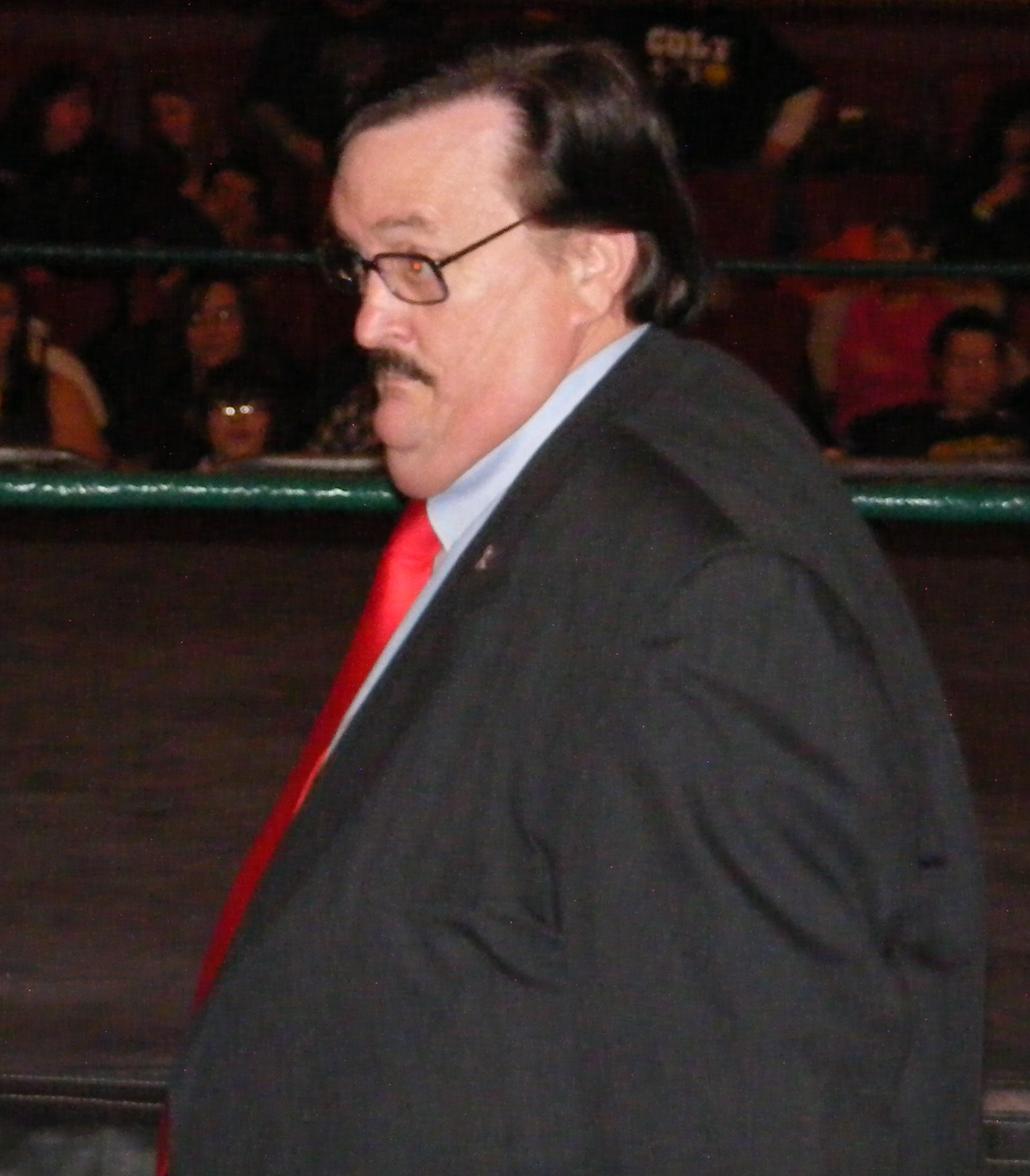
Bearer in 2011

Bearer returned to the Boston-based Millennium Wrestling Federation as top heel manager along with John "Bradshaw" Layfield after four years, leading "Stalker" Dylan Kage at Soul Survivor VI against The Iron Sheik and "Black Machismo" Jay Lethal in the Sheik's retirement match on April 24, 2010. On October 12, 2012, Bearer managed Vader against Rikishi at Pro Wrestling Syndicate in Rahway, New Jersey.

The final wrestler managed by Bearer on the independent circuit was Shaun Ricker, who would later become widely known in WWE under the ring name LA Knight.

== Other media ==
Paul Bearer has been a playable character in at least five WWE-licensed video games: WWF Attitude, WWF WrestleMania 2000, WWF SmackDown!, WWF No Mercy, and WWF SmackDown! 2: Know Your Role. Bearer was also featured as a manager in the THQ video game WWE Legends of WrestleMania in 2009 (depending on whether or not he's paired with The Undertaker, he enters with or without his signature urn). In 2010, Moody did voice over work as Paul Bearer for the game, WWE SmackDown vs. Raw 2011, where he was featured in one of the Road To WrestleMania storylines for the game, as well as a selectable manager. He was also in WWE All Stars (during The Undertaker's "Path of Champions", voiced again by Moody), WWE '13, and WWE 2K14 as a selectable manager and part of the Attitude Era single-player mode, and 30 Years of WrestleMania mode respectively representing The Brothers of Destruction. Bearer further appeared as a manager in WWE 2K15 (from the "Path of the Warrior" Showcase DLC), WWE 2K16 (as part of the "Austin 3:16" Showcase), WWE 2K24, and WWE 2K25 (unlocked via VC).

== Personal life ==
Moody married Dianna McDole in December 1978 and had two sons, Michael and Daniel. Dianna died due to complications resulting from breast cancer on January 31, 2009. His first son Michael died on September 21, 2014, at the age of 35. His second son Daniel wrestled on the independent circuit as DJ Pringle and died on March 24, 2026, at the age of 39.

In November 2003, WWE assisted Moody with $35,000 for gastric bypass surgery as a signing bonus. Moody's health improved with him eventually dropping around 240 pounds (110 kg). He admitted that prior to the operation, he had weighed 525 pounds (238 kg) and had difficulty walking.

In 2005, Moody, with three business partners started his own independent promotion known as Gulf South Wrestling. He dissolved the company in May 2007 after learning that his partners wanted to force him out of the promotion and operate it without him.

== Death ==
On March 2, 2013, Moody attended the annual Gulf Coast Wrestlers Reunion in Mobile, Alabama, riding a wheelchair. According to club board member "Cowboy" Bob Kelly, Moody was having breathing difficulties at the event. He was coughing, and told friends he was going to seek treatment for respiratory problems as he had trouble standing at the time. Kelly said that Moody was treated for a blood clot after the reunion. On March 5, 2013, Moody died in Mobile, Alabama, at the age of 58 due to a heart attack. The cause of the heart attack was supraventricular tachycardia, which causes a dangerously high heart rate. He is interred beside his wife at Serenity Memorial Gardens Cemetery in Theodore, Alabama.

=== Hall of Fame and legacy ===
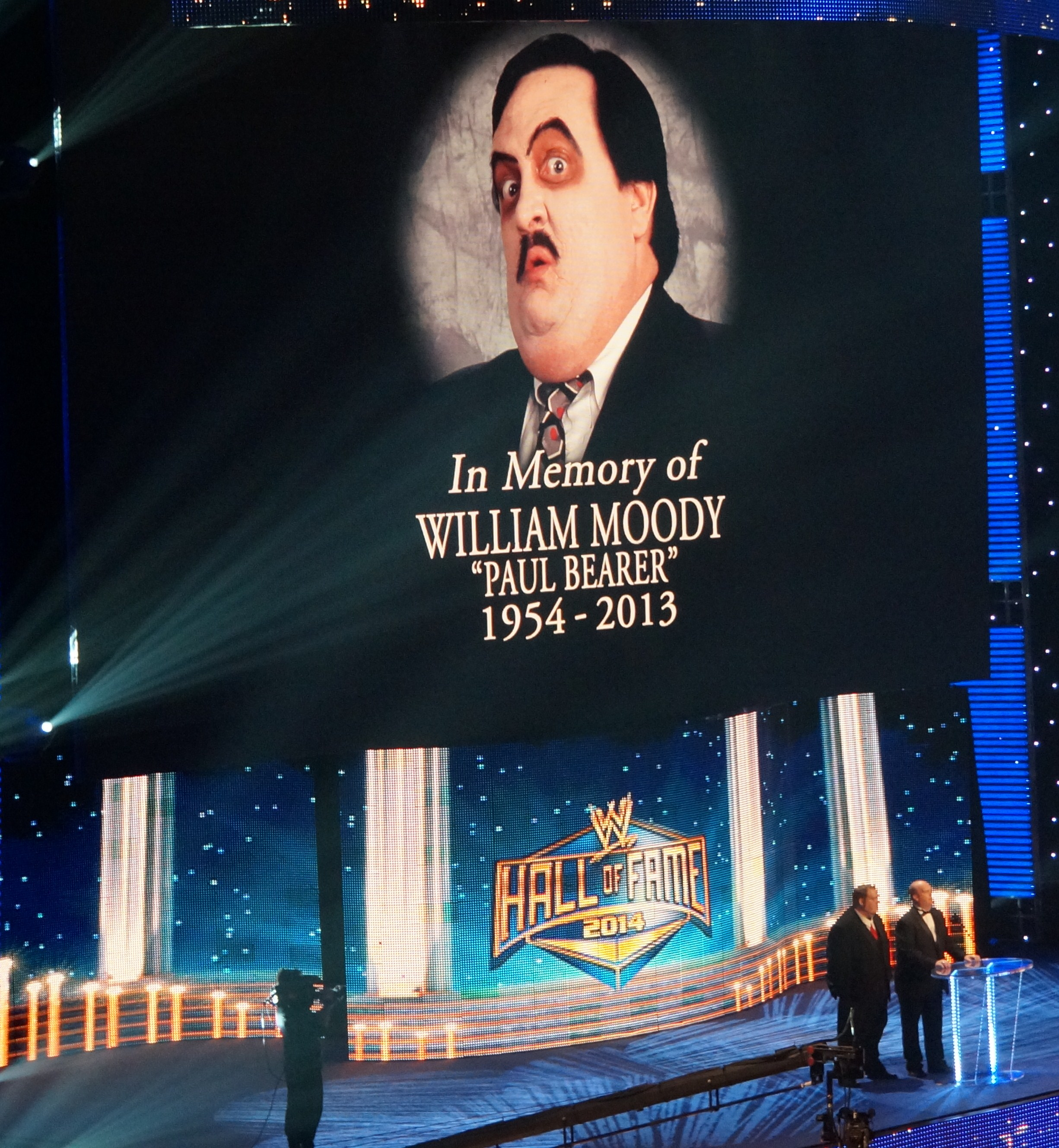
Bearer was posthumously inducted into the WWE Hall of Fame, which was accepted by his two real-life sons (bottom right).

Following his death, Moody became a driving point in WWE storylines; the March 11 episode of Raw was held as a tribute to Bearer. The Undertaker paid tribute but was interrupted by CM Punk, his WrestleMania 29 opponent. Punk then mocked Bearer over the next few weeks against both The Undertaker and Kane, including stealing his urn and attacking Kane with it. On the April 1 episode of Raw, Paul Heyman dressed up as Paul Bearer and Punk poured the ashes of the urn onto The Undertaker after attacking him. At WrestleMania 29, The Undertaker defeated Punk and took back the urn, dedicating his victory to Paul Bearer.

On the March 3, 2014, episode of Raw it was announced that Paul Bearer would be inducted into the WWE Hall of Fame. At the ceremony itself, Kane inducted Bearer, and his sons Michael and Daniel Moody accepted the induction; afterwards, The Undertaker came out in character and paid tribute. Bearer's family was also presented a Hall of Fame ring, which was later featured in a 2016 episode of Pawn Stars; the seller stated his ring was given to him by his family, but he declined show host Rick Harrison's $4,000 offer. Bearer's son Daniel later stated that the ring was a fake.

On November 22, 2020, a transparent image of Paul Bearer appeared for The Undertaker's final farewell at Survivor Series while The Undertaker performed his trademark kneeling pose.

== Awards and accomplishments ==
- Cauliflower Alley Club
  - Lou Thesz Award (2013)
- Gulf Coast Wrestlers Reunion
  - Lee Fields Gulf Coast Wrestling Hall of Fame (2014)
- Pro Wrestling Illustrated
  - Manager of the Year (1998)
- WWE
  - WWE Hall of Fame (Class of 2014)

== Bibliography ==
- Stone Cold Steve Austin and Jim Ross (2003). The Stone Cold Truth. Pocket Books. ISBN 0-7434-7720-0.
