= Scott Hall =

American professional wrestler (1958–2022)

- Hall c. October 1993
- Born: Scott Oliver Hall; October 20, 1958; St. Mary's County, Maryland, U.S.
- Died: March 14, 2022 (aged 63); Marietta, Georgia, U.S.
- Resting place: Trinity Church Cemetery, St. Mary's County, Maryland, U.S. 38.18735° N, 76.43495° W
- Years active: 1984-2016
- Spouses: Dana Burgio (m. 1990; div. 1998) (m. 1999; div. 2001); Jessica Hart (m. 2006; div. 2007)
- Children: 2, including Cody Hall
- Professional wrestling career
- Ring name(s): American Starship Coyote; Razor Ramon; Scott Hall; Texas Scott; Diamond Studd
- Billed height: 6 ft 7 in (201 cm)
- Billed weight: 287 lb (130 kg)
- Billed from: Miami, Florida
- Trained by: Hiro Matsuda
- Debut: October 2, 1984
- Retired: May 19, 2010

Signature
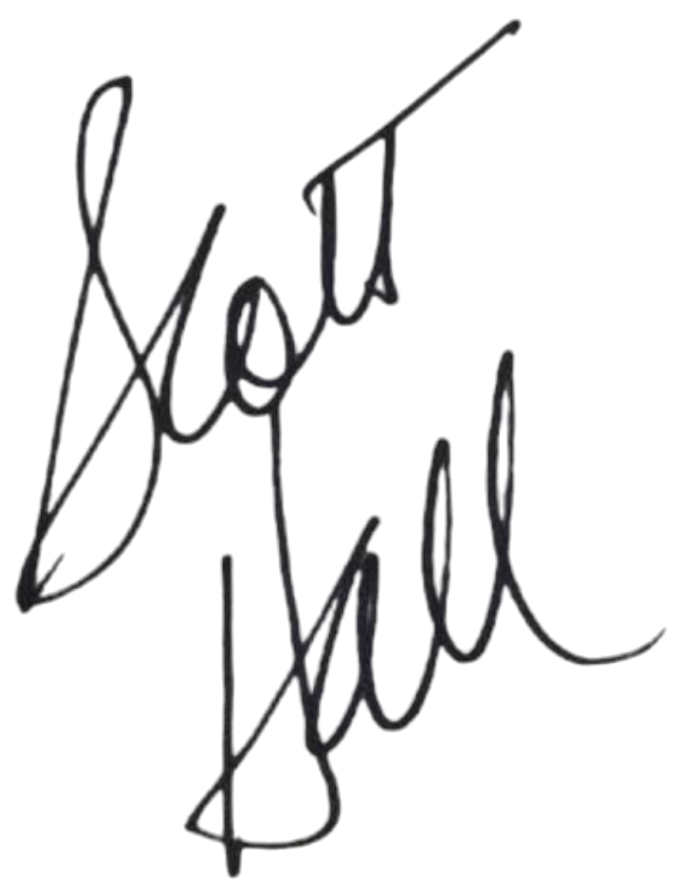

Scott Oliver Hall (October 20, 1958 – March 14, 2022) was an American professional wrestler. He was best known for his tenures with World Championship Wrestling (WCW) under his real name and with the World Wrestling Federation (WWF, now WWE) under the ring name Razor Ramon.

Born in St. Mary's County, Maryland, Hall began his career in 1984. He rose to prominence after signing with the WWF in May 1992, assuming the name Razor Ramon. While within the company, he won the WWF Intercontinental Championship four times. He departed the company in May 1996, and subsequently signed with rival promotion WCW, where he became a founding member of the New World Order (nWo) faction, along with Hulk Hogan and Kevin Nash. In the company, he became a two-time WCW United States Heavyweight Champion, a one-time WCW World Television Champion, and a seven-time WCW World Tag Team Champion. He left WCW in February 2000, returning to the WWF (later renamed WWE) for a brief stint in 2002.

He spent the rest of his career wrestling for various promotions, such as Extreme Championship Wrestling (ECW), New Japan Pro-Wrestling (NJPW), and Total Nonstop Action Wrestling (TNA), where he held the TNA World Tag Team Championship once, with Kevin Nash and Eric Young. He wrestled his final match in June 2016. Although he never won a world championship in a major promotion, Hall held the WWC Universal Heavyweight Championship once for the Puerto Rico–based promotion World Wrestling Council. He was inducted into the WWE Hall of Fame as a singles competitor in 2014, and as a member of the nWo in 2020. Hall struggled with alcoholism and substance abuse for much of his career and later life, and died in March 2022, at the age of 63.

== Early life ==
Hall was born in St. Mary's County, Maryland, on October 20, 1958. He grew up as a military brat, attending high school in Munich and moving once every year before he was 15.

== Professional wrestling career ==
=== Early career (1984–1985) ===
Hall began his career in 1984 in the National Wrestling Alliance's (NWA) Florida territory Championship Wrestling from Florida (CWF) and soon began a feud with Dusty Rhodes. He and Dan Spivey trained together in Florida (mainly under Rhodes, but also under Mike Rotunda and Barry Windham). When it was time for the two to debut as a tag team, Rhodes sent them to work in Jim Crockett Jr.'s Charlotte, North Carolina–based territory. They debuted as American Starship, Hall under the ring name Starship Coyote and Spivey under the ring name Starship Eagle.

At first, American Starship were booked to wrestle infrequently, so much so that the two were given ground crew jobs for the Charlotte Orioles (which Jim Crockett owned at the time). When they did get in the ring, it was with little success. The highlight of their stay in Crockett's Mid Atlantic Championship Wrestling was a losing challenge to Arn and Ole Anderson for the NWA National Tag Team Championship. After leaving Crockett, the duo joined Bob Geigel's NWA Central States territory (based in Kansas City) in 1985.

They received a shot at NWA Central States Tag Team Champions Marty Jannetty and "Bulldog" Bob Brown, but lost the match. Dan Spivey's stay in the Central States territory was brief. He returned to the Carolinas and Crockett, jobbing in the freshly rebranded Jim Crockett Promotions as "American Starship" Eagle. Hall, meanwhile, stayed in Central States.

=== American Wrestling Association (1985–1989) ===
Hall joined the American Wrestling Association (AWA) in 1985, where he wrestled as "Magnum" Scott Hall and, later, "Big" Scott Hall. He wrestled as a babyface wrestler. Verne Gagne, the owner and promoter of the AWA, had wanted to push Hall to the same heights as he had Hulk Hogan, following Hogan's departure for Vince McMahon's World Wrestling Federation (WWF). Gagne had Hall use mannerisms and moves similar to Hogan. Hall also traveled to Japan, where he wrestled several matches for New Japan Pro-Wrestling (NJPW) between 1987 and 1990.

Hall formed a tag team with his more experienced friend Curt Hennig, whom he later would credit for cultivating his early professional wrestling career. The team defeated Jimmy Garvin and Steve Regal for the AWA World Tag Team Championship on January 18, 1986, in a 58-minute match in Albuquerque, New Mexico. The champions defended against such challengers as Buddy Rose and Doug Somers, Nord the Barbarian and Boris Zhukov, and Bill and Scott Irwin. They lost the belts to Rose and Somers by countout (an unusual and unexplained deviation from the standard rule of pro wrestling) on May 17, after interference by Colonel DeBeers. After losing the title, Hall and Hennig soon parted ways. Hall then received shots at the AWA World Heavyweight Championship, against Stan Hansen and Rick Martel. Although Gagne wanted to put the belt on Hall, Hall hated the cold weather in the territory, recognized the AWA as a "sinking ship", and left for the NWA in 1989.

=== World Wrestling Federation Tryouts (1987, 1990) ===
Hall received a tryout at a house show in August 1987 teaming with Jerry Allen losing to Iron Mike Sharpe and Barry Horowitz. On January 23, 1990, Hall received another tryout at a WWF Wrestling Challenge taping in Fort Myers, Florida. At the event, Hall was defeated by Paul Roma, and was not signed by the company.

=== World Championship Wrestling (1989) ===
Hall was brought into the NWA's World Championship Wrestling (WCW) territory by Jim Ross in 1989, as part of the NWA's initiative to develop new, young stars (also including Brian Pillman and Sid Vicious). He made his debut on the June 3 edition of World Championship Wrestling (the predecessor to WCW Saturday Night) in a vignette that showed Scott "Gator" Hall swimming and playing volleyball at a beach, riding boats, fishing, and scaring alligators. His in-ring debut came on June 16 on a house show in Cleveland, OH, where he teamed with Randy Rose in a losing effort against WCW World Tag-Team Champions The Freebirds. While waiting for his first television match, he continued to wrestle on the road and was winless in tag-team and singles action, facing Norman, The Freebirds, and former tag partner, Dan Spivey. Hall finally gained his first victory on June 29 when he pinned Rip Morgan in Salisbury, MD, and then entered a successful house show series with Bill Irwin.

His television debut finally came on the July 9 edition of World Championship Wrestling where he was pinned by The Great Muta. On the July 9 edition of WCW Pro he faced Terry Funk and was defeated. His PPV debut came at The Great American Bash: The Glory Days, where he participated in a King of the Hill battle royal. He then began jobbing regularly, losing to The Great Muta, Mike Rotunda, Sid Vicious, Ron Simmons, and Butch Reed. His final match came on November 7 when he was defeated by Butch Reed at a house show in Chicago, IL. After this, he went on hiatus.

=== International promotions (1990–1991) ===
Shortly afterwards Hall joined New Japan Pro-Wrestling, teaming with Larry Cameron and defeating Hiroshi Hase & Kuniaki Kobayashi March 2, 1990, at Korakuen Hall in Tokyo, Japan. He wrestled numerous times for the company, facing a diverse group of opponents including Bam Bam Bigelow, Koji Kitao, Nord the Barbarian, and Shinya Hashimoto.

Scott Hall, as Texas Scott, competed for the Catch Wrestling Association (CWA) at the "Catch Cup '90" tournament on December 22, 1990, in Bremen, Germany before 6,000 fans. Hall was defeated by the Soul Taker in the tournament final.

From 1990 to 1991, Hall had a stint in the Puerto Rican promotion World Wrestling Council (WWC). On March 3, he defeated Miguel Pérez, Jr. for the WWC Caribbean Heavyweight Championship. He lost it to Super Medic III on April 20.

=== Return to WCW (1991–1992) ===
After wrestling a dark match on April 29, 1991, in Atlanta, GA at a taping of World Championship Wrestling, Hall made his official return to WCW and was renamed "The Diamond Studd", a gimmick similar to Rick Rude's (both were cocky, vain and would invite attractive women from the audience into the ring). He was managed by Diamond Dallas Page, and made his first appearance on May 19 at SuperBrawl 1. In his debut match, he squashed Tommy Rich on the June 14 episode of Clash of the Champions XV: Knocksville USA. He defeated Tom Zenk at The Great American Bash. It was during his time as "The Diamond Studd" that he also began sporting his trademark toothpicks and also debuted his trademark toothpick fling at television cameras; Page has publicly stated that he got the idea for Hall's on-screen toothpick after the two used toothpicks at a Waffle House and that he was originally supposed to flick toothpicks at cameras with Hall, but couldn't because one fell out of his mouth before the first toothpick promo. At Clash of the Champions XVI: Fall Brawl on September 2, The Diamond Studd lost to Ron Simmons. At Halloween Havoc 1991, the team of Studd, Abdullah the Butcher, Cactus Jack, and Big Van Vader lost to Sting, El Gigante, and The Steiner Brothers in a "Chamber of Horrors Match". On the November 19 episode of Clash of the Champions XVII, Studd lost to Zenk in a rematch from The Great American Bash.

After an injury sidelined him for Starrcade in December 1991, Studd entered 1992 forming short-lived tag teams with Vinnie Vegas and Scotty Flamingo (as part of The Diamond Mine stable), as well as with members of Paul E. Dangerously's Dangerous Alliance. Studd began a feud with Dustin Rhodes in April 1992 when he interfered in two televised matches Rhodes had with Bobby Eaton. The idea of adding him to the Dangerous Alliance was contemplated, but fell through, and Hall left WCW shortly after a final televised match against Rob Campbell on May 8.

=== World Wrestling Federation (1992–1996) ===
==== Debut and various feuds (1992–1993) ====
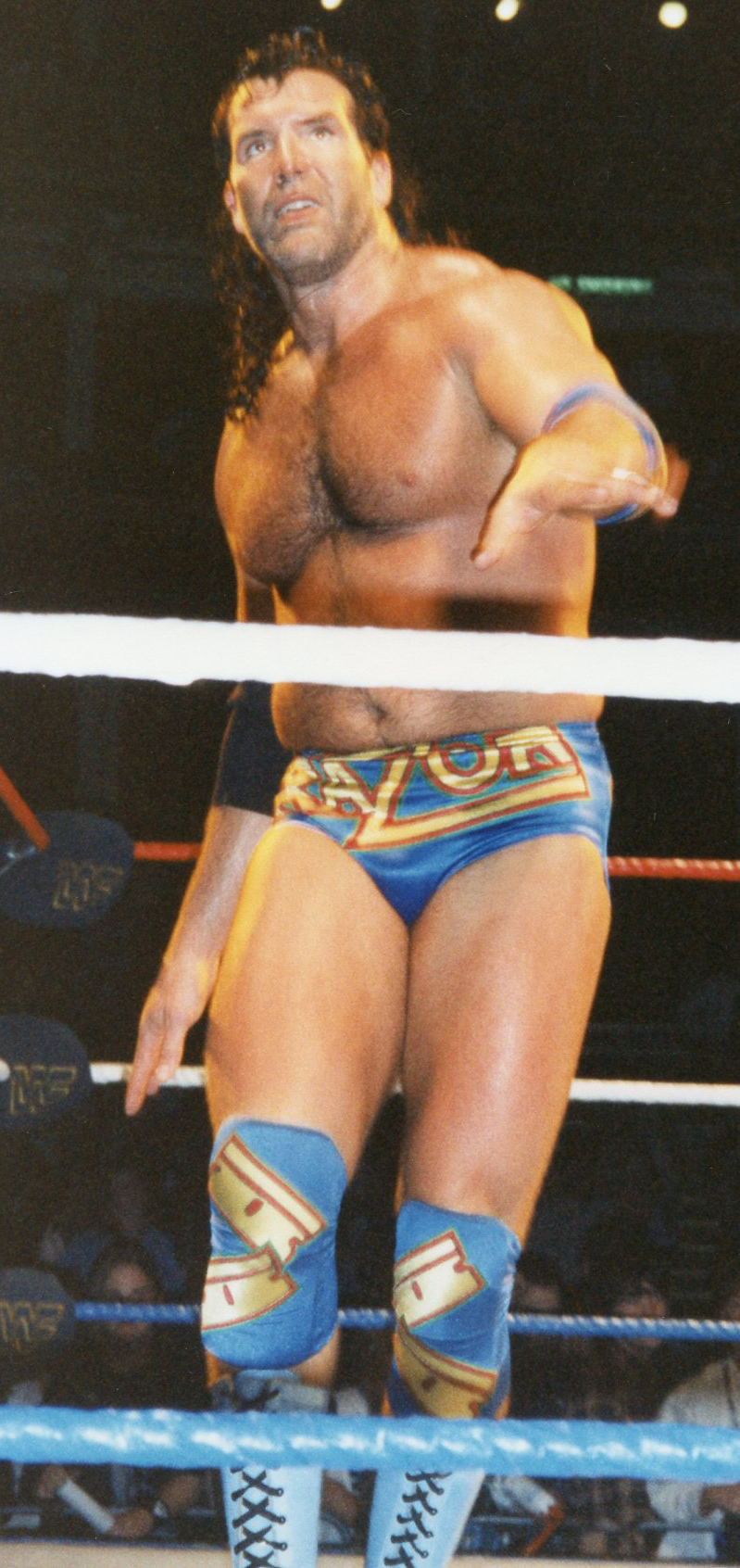
Hall as Razor Ramon, 1995

Hall joined the World Wrestling Federation (WWF) later that month, as "Razor Ramon", a shady and stylish Cuban American bully from Miami. The character was modeled after the characters Tony Montana and Manny Ribera from the 1983 film Scarface. Ramon's nickname (The Bad Guy) and catchphrase ("Say hello to The Bad Guy") derived from Montana's quotes: "Say hello to my little friend" and "Say goodnight to the bad guy". However, Inside The Ropes journalist Adam Morrison noted in March 2022 that Hall's Razor Ramon character also maintained "cocky and cool" aspects which were similar to his WCW "Diamond Studd" character. Morrison also stated that Hall's Diamond Studd character "laid the very foundations upon which he would create ‘The Bad Guy’ under Vince McMahon's empire."

He made his first appearance as Razor Ramon in a dark match on a Wrestling Challenge taping against Chris Hahn on May 18, 1992. Later in his career, Hall claimed he pitched the idea of a Scarface-like character during a meeting with Vince McMahon and Pat Patterson, as a joke. Hall quoted lines from the movie with a Cuban accent and gave ideas for vignettes that would recreate several of the movie’s scenes, such as driving around South Florida in a convertible with a leopard-skin interior. Although taken right from the movie, Hall claims McMahon and Patterson were nevertheless floored by the ideas and called him a "genius". Hall later learned that McMahon and Patterson had neither seen nor heard of the movie, and believed that Hall was coming up with the ideas himself. Patterson and McMahon came up with the name "Razor", but agreed with Hall's suggestion that it should be a nickname, and that the character should have a proper given name. Hall later asked Tito Santana for a Latino-sounding name that started with "R". Santana suggested "Ramon", Hall brought it back to McMahon and the name stuck. The Razor Ramon logo and costume were designed by Tom Fleming.

After weeks of introductory vignettes, Razor Ramon made his in-ring debut on the August 8, 1992, episode of Superstars, defeating local jobber Paul Van Dale (the father of future WWE wrestler Carmella) with his finishing move, The Razor's Edge (previously called "The Diamond Death Drop" in WCW). Early on, Ramon wore large gold chain necklaces to the ring. While handing them to an attendant at ringside he would threaten "Something happens to this, something gonna happen to you", and then flick his toothpick at the hapless attendant.

Razor's first major angle began on the September 14 episode of Prime Time Wrestling, when he interfered in a WWF Championship match between champion Randy Savage and Ric Flair, attacking Savage on the floor and enabling Flair to win the title. As a result, Razor and Savage started a feud, which later involved Ultimate Warrior, after Warrior saved Savage from a post-match beating by Razor. Razor and Flair were scheduled to face the Ultimate Maniacs (Savage and Warrior) at Survivor Series. Warrior was fired from the WWF prior to the event and replaced by Flair's "executive consultant", Mr. Perfect. Razor and Flair lost to Savage and Perfect via disqualification, for constantly double-teaming them.

WWF Champion Bret Hart was scheduled to defend his title against Ultimate Warrior at the Royal Rumble, but Razor Ramon replaced Warrior after the latter left the company. During the feud, Razor verbally disrespected Hart and the Hart wrestling family. Razor lost to Hart at the Royal Rumble, submitting to the Sharpshooter. Razor made his WrestleMania debut at WrestleMania IX, pinning former WWF Champion Bob Backlund with a roll-up.

On the May 17 episode of Monday Night Raw he suffered an upset loss to jobber "The Kid" (who consequently became known as "The 1–2–3 Kid"), beginning a feud between the two. It carried into the King of the Ring tournament and triggered a slow fan favorite turn for Razor, as he gained respect for The 1–2–3 Kid and support from the crowd. Ted DiBiase showed no respect for Razor, making fun of him for losing to such a small jobber. Ramon helped The 1–2–3 Kid defeat DiBiase, solidifying his face turn. The feud culminated at SummerSlam, where Ramon defeated DiBiase in DiBiase's final WWF match.

==== Record-setting Intercontinental Champion (1993–1996) ====
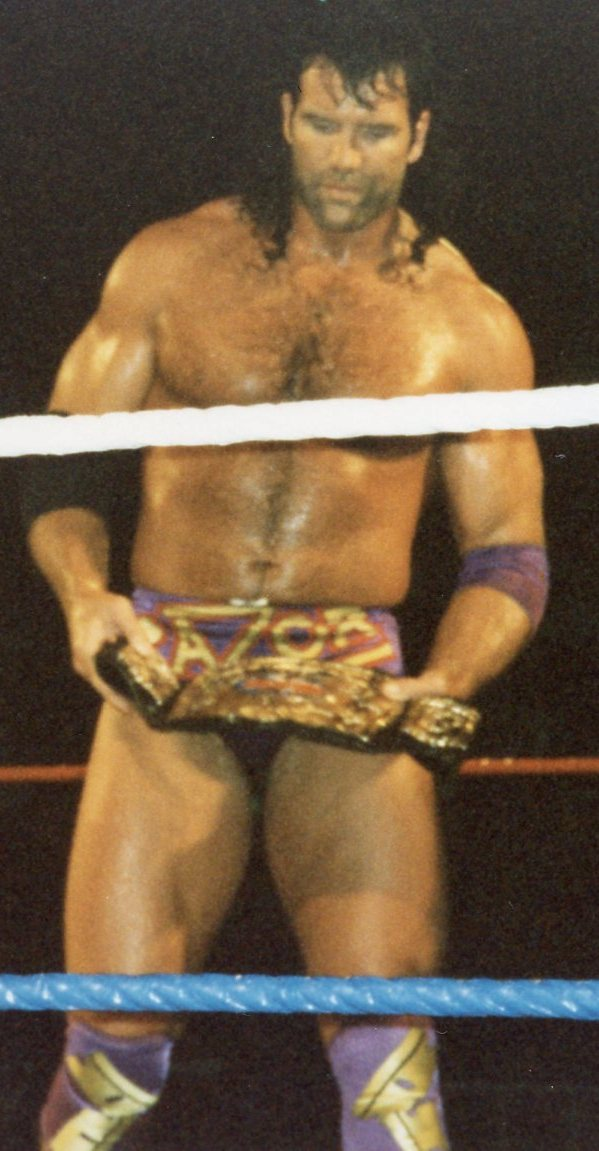
Ramon holding the Tag Team Championship at a WWF event

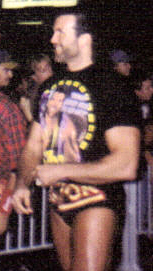
Razor Ramon at a WWF event in 1995

On the October 4, 1993, episode of Monday Night Raw, a 20-man battle royal was held; the last two participants would face each other the next week for the vacant WWF Intercontinental Championship. Razor and Rick Martel were those final two. The next week on Raw, Razor pinned Martel after a Razor's Edge to win the Intercontinental Championship.

Razor Ramon successfully defended his title against Irwin R. Schyster at Royal Rumble 1994. He also began a feud with Shawn Michaels over which man had the stronger claim to the Intercontinental Championship. Michaels had been stripped of the title months before due to "inactivity" (he was actually suspended during that time). He returned to television with his own version of the belt, claiming he was still the champion, since he hadn't been beaten for it. The matter was settled when Ramon defeated Michaels in a ladder match at WrestleMania X, becoming the undisputed Intercontinental Champion after retrieving both belts. This match was critically acclaimed, and was voted as the Match of the Year for 1994 by readers of Pro Wrestling Illustrated, and it was also the first WWF match to receive a five star rating from sports journalist Dave Meltzer in his Wrestling Observer Newsletter. On WWE.com, this match is ranked No. 5 of the Top 24 Matches in WrestleMania History.

Razor continued to feud with Michaels and his bodyguard Diesel. On the April 30 episode of Superstars, he lost the Intercontinental Title to Diesel, after interference from Michaels. At SummerSlam, Razor (with Walter Payton in his corner) defeated Diesel to win the WWF Intercontinental Championship for a second time, after Shawn Michaels accidentally hit Diesel with Sweet Chin Music.

At Survivor Series, he captained a team called "The Bad Guys", consisting of himself, The 1–2–3 Kid, Davey Boy Smith, and The Headshrinkers (Fatu and Sione). They faced The Teamsters (Shawn Michaels, Diesel, Owen Hart, Jim Neidhart, and Jeff Jarrett). Ramon ended up the sole survivor of the match. This began a feud with Jeff Jarrett, which led into the next year. At the 1995 Royal Rumble, Razor lost the Intercontinental Championship to Jarrett, in controversial fashion; Jarrett had originally won the match by count-out, but demanded that the match be restarted so he could win the title. It was, and Jarrett pinned Razor with a small package.

Razor faced Jarrett in a rematch for the Intercontinental Championship at WrestleMania XI, winning by disqualification when Jarrett's assistant The Roadie interfered. Jarrett retained the title, as a title cannot change hands by countout or disqualification. Razor defeated Jarrett and The Roadie at In Your House 1, in a handicap match.

Razor defeated Jarrett in a ladder match at a May 19, 1995 house show to win his third WWF Intercontinental Championship. Razor Ramon was the first man to win the Intercontinental Title three times. On May 22, he re-lost the title to Jarrett. On June 9, Razor suffered a rib injury during a ladder match rematch against Jarrett. Around this time, he had formed a team with Savio Vega, and Vega replaced Razor to defeat Irwin R. Schyster in the Free for All tournament match before the King of the Ring pay-per-view. Razor managed Vega throughout the tournament. He lost to Mabel in the final match. Razor and Vega lost to Men on a Mission (Mabel and Mo) at In Your House 2: The Lumberjacks, and lost a WWF (World) Tag Team Championship match to Owen Hart and Yokozuna on the August 7 episode of Raw.

Razor had an Intercontinental Championship ladder match (a rematch from WrestleMania X) against the new champion Shawn Michaels at SummerSlam, but lost. He then began a feud with Dean Douglas. Razor defeated Douglas at In Your House 4 to win the Intercontinental Championship, after Michaels had just forfeited the title to Douglas. This win made him the first four-time Intercontinental Champion in WWF history.

In early 1996, Razor feuded with newcomer Goldust, leading to an Intercontinental Championship match at the Royal Rumble. Razor lost the title to Goldust after Razor's former partner The 1–2–3 Kid attacked him. Ramon was originally scheduled to face Goldust in a rematch for the title at WrestleMania XII in a Miami Street Fight, but Hall was suspended for six weeks by the WWF due to his drug use. Reporting at the time had Hall as already having given his notice via telegram as he looked to leave for WCW. The suspension meant he would sit out the rest of his contractual obligations and miss the opportunity to receive the higher Wrestlemania payday. Hall returned to WWF television at April's In Your House 7, where he lost to Vader.

By March, rumors ran that the WWF would protect the Razor Ramon character from being used by Hall as being their own intellectual property. It became true in September 1996 in the form of Rick Bognar playing the part of Razor as part of a revenge storyline where the return of "Razor Ramon" was revealed by an angered Jim Ross.

He became associated with the backstage group known as The Kliq (also consisting of Kevin Nash (Diesel), Paul Levesque (Hunter Hearst Helmsley), Shawn Michaels, and Sean Waltman (The 1–2–3 Kid)). Hall was involved in an incident dubbed the "Curtain Call" at a MSG show in May 1996. Because Hall and fellow Kliq member Kevin Nash were departing for WCW, the pair (along with Michaels and Levesque) broke kayfabe by celebrating and embracing in the ring together, though the characters they portrayed were supposed to be enemies. According to Hall, he went to WCW not for the money, but because they offered him days off. Other reporting claimed he resigned due to being unhappy with his booking and a drop in yearly pay from 1994 to 1995.

=== Second return to WCW (1996–2000) ===
==== New World Order (1996–1998) ====
Hall's first appearance on the WCW television show after leaving WWF was an unannounced promo on May 27, 1996, appearing from the crowd in street clothes and claimed to be "an outsider". On June 10, he was joined by Kevin Nash. They stated they were undertaking a hostile takeover of WCW, then slammed interviewer Eric Bischoff through the commentator's table. The angle paralleled the real-life competition between WCW and the WWF. At Bash at the Beach, Nash and Hall (now known as The Outsiders) challenged Sting, Lex Luger, and Randy Savage to a six-man tag team match, saying they had a mystery partner. That partner turned out to be Hulk Hogan, and the three formed the New World Order (nWo). The stable stormed WCW, recruiting such stars as Syxx (formerly 1-2-3 Kid) and The Giant.

The Outsiders closed out 1996 with a victory over Sting and Lex Luger at Hog Wild, and a WarGames match win at Fall Brawl. They defeated Harlem Heat at Halloween Havoc for their first WCW World Tag Team Championship. They successfully defended the title against The Nasty Boys and The Faces of Fear in a three-way match at World War 3, and then again defeated The Faces of Fear at Starrcade. They lost the title to The Steiner Brothers at Souled Out, but two days later Eric Bischoff returned the title due to the fact that the referee was not the official referee for the match. The Outsiders held the World Tag Team Championship from February 24, 1997, to October 13, 1997, often facing The Steiner Brothers, Lex Luger and The Giant, and combinations of The Four Horsemen. In May 1997, Hall and Nash teamed with Masahiro Chono to defeat the Steiner Brothers and Keiji Mutoh at New Japan Pro-Wrestling (NJPW)'s Strong Style Evolution in the Osaka Dome.

In late March 1997, Hall failed a drug test and was forced into a rehab and was written off television for a month which forced him to miss Spring Stampede, Hall came back on the April 21 edition of Monday Nitro.

Since Eric Bischoff (the Executive Vice President of WCW) was a member of the nWo, he used his power to return the title to The Outsiders on a technicality whenever they lost it. The Outsiders would also use the Freebird Rule to defend their title. With Nash and Syxx out with injuries, Hall mostly wrestled singles matches in the last quarter of 1997, and in one of them he submitted to Lex Luger in a grudge match at Halloween Havoc, with Larry Zbyszko as the guest referee. Hall won the 60-man battle royal at World War 3 in November 1997 to earn a shot at the WCW World Heavyweight Championship.

On the January 12, 1998, episode of Nitro, The Outsiders defeated The Steiner Brothers to win the WCW World Tag Team Championship for a fourth time. Hall wrestled Larry Zbyszko at Souled Out and lost by disqualification. The Outsiders lost the title back to The Steiner Brothers on the February 9 episode of Nitro. At SuperBrawl VIII, The Outsiders won the WCW World Tag Team Championship for a fifth time, again by defeating The Steiner Brothers. At Uncensored, Hall got his WCW World Heavyweight Championship shot against Sting, losing the match despite interference on his behalf from Dusty Rhodes. Hall was (legitimately) taken off TV for a short while and forced by WCW to enter rehab, after he and Nash showed up to the March 16, 1998, episode of Nitro heavily intoxicated and under the influence of painkillers. While Hall was absent, the nWo split into two feuding factions. At Slamboree, Hall returned to team with Kevin Nash, for a tag team title defense against Sting and The Giant. Hall turned on Nash, costing them the title, and switched sides to align himself with Hulk Hogan and his splinter faction, nWo Hollywood.

On the July 6 episode of Nitro, Hall was handpicked by Hogan to wrestle United States Heavyweight Champion Bill Goldberg. Hall lost the match, giving Goldberg a shot at Hogan's World Heavyweight Championship later that night (which Goldberg won). Hogan publicly blamed Hall for the loss, and Hall was treated as a "weak link" by the rest of the nWo, especially Scott Steiner. On July 13, Hogan challenged Hall to a match on Nitro, during which Kevin Nash (leader of the nWo "Wolfpac" faction) interfered, but as he was apparently about to Jacknife Powerbomb Hogan and regain Hall as his friend, Hall viciously attacked him, proving his allegiance to Hogan and nWo Hollywood. In the following weeks, Hall mocked Nash, calling himself "Medium Sexy (later "Super Sexy"), the Nash Killer". On the July 20 episode of Nitro, Hall (with The Giant) won the WCW World Tag Team Championship for a sixth time, defeating Sting and Nash after outside interference from Bret Hart (who was feuding with Sting at the time). This reign ended at Halloween Havoc, when Rick Steiner defeated The Giant and Scott Steiner (who replaced Hall) to win the title, even after Rick's partner Buff Bagwell had turned on him. Hall and Nash faced each other on October 25 at Halloween Havoc. After hitting Hall with two Jacknife Powerbombs, Nash left the ring and lost the match by countout, in what was described by the commentators as an act of mercy.

Hall was ejected from nWo Hollywood in late 1998, after Scott Steiner took control of the group in Hogan's absence, and then referred to himself as "The Lone Wolf". On November 30, 1998, Hall needed a tag team partner to face Steiner and Horace Hogan. Initially, Hall said he would do it alone, but Kevin Nash came to the entrance and offered his help. The team (no longer billed as The Outsiders) won the match. At Starrcade, Hall, disguised as a security guard, used a stun gun on WCW World Heavyweight Champion Goldberg during his title defense against Kevin Nash. Not having seen the interference, Nash powerbombed and covered Goldberg to become the WCW World Heavyweight Champion, and break Goldberg's 173 match winning streak.

==== nWo reunion and championship reigns (1999–2000) ====
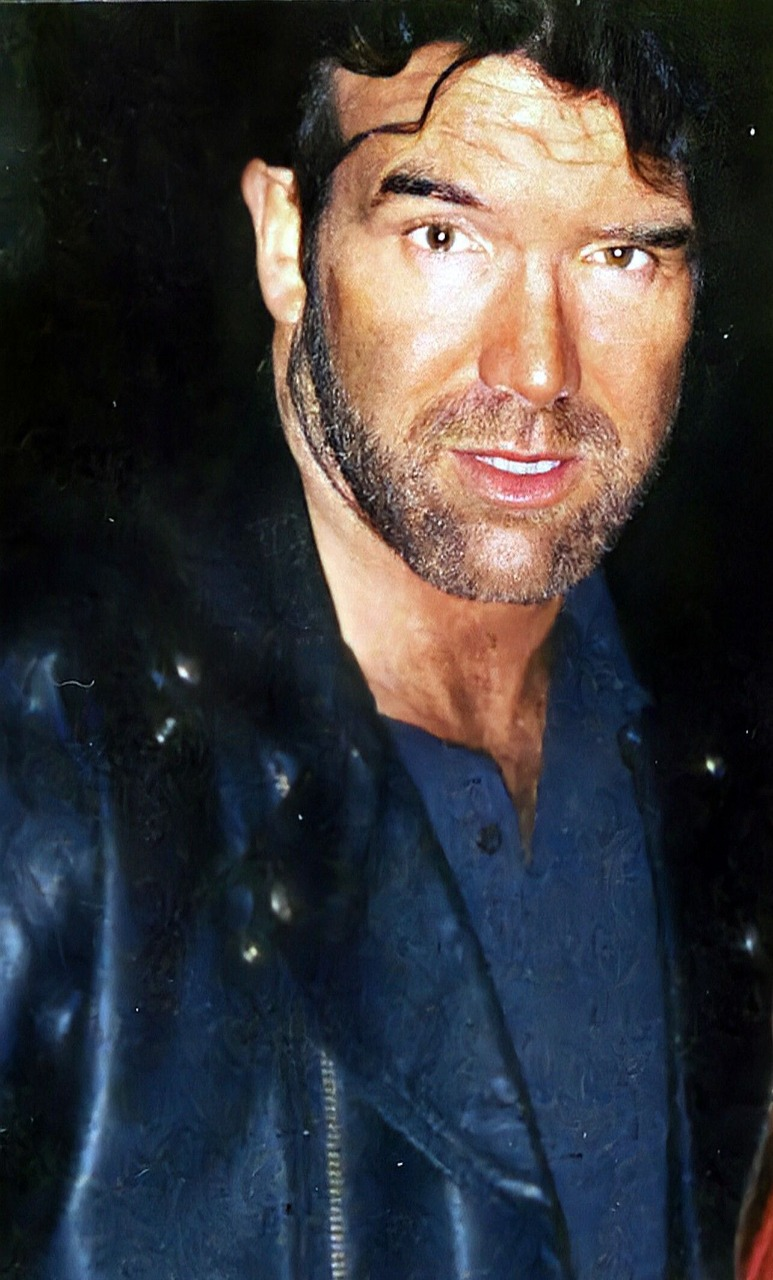
Hall c. late 1990s

Hall and Nash were allied again and, in January 1999, the two nWo factions rejoined. Hall feuded with Goldberg and faced him in a ladder taser match on January 19 at Souled Out. He lost the match when Goldberg used the taser gun on him.

At SuperBrawl IX, Hall defeated Roddy Piper for the WCW United States Heavyweight Championship. Shortly after, he suffered a foot injury which forced him to forfeit the title. Hall was not seen again until October 1999, when he and Kevin Nash began sitting at ringside during WCW television, proclaiming "the band was getting back together."

On the November 8 episode of Nitro, Hall defeated Goldberg, Bret Hart, and Sid Vicious in a Texas tornado ladder match to regain the United States Heavyweight Championship. Two weeks later, at Mayhem, he won the WCW World Television Championship after Rick Steiner forfeited the match due to injury. He successfully defended both titles against Booker T later that night. Eight days later, on Nitro, Hall vacated the Television title by throwing it into a trash can. He was soon stripped of his United States title, after being sidelined with a knee injury.

Hall and Nash teamed up to defeat Bret Hart and Goldberg on the December 13 episode of Nitro, winning the WCW World Tag Team Championship for the sixth time. After the nWo returned in December 1999, Hall joined Nash, Bret Hart, Jeff Jarrett, and Scott Steiner in what was coined "nWo 2000". However, Hall was injured again thereafter and the tag team titles were vacated.

In 2000, Hall feuded with WCW World Heavyweight Champion Sid Vicious and nWo teammate Jeff Jarrett over the world title, but he was pinned by Sid in a three-way match with Jarrett at SuperBrawl on February 20, 2000, in what would be his last match with the company.

=== Extreme Championship Wrestling and Japan (2000–2001) ===
After departing WCW in early 2000, Hall was inactive for several months. On November 10, 2000, he made a surprise appearance at an Extreme Championship Wrestling house show in Schenectady, New York, teaming with Jerry Lynn to defeat Justin Credible and Rhino. The following day, in Poughkeepsie, New York, Hall defeated Justin Credible, then lost to Sal E. Graziano.

In March 2001, Hall returned to New Japan Pro-Wrestling, where he joined the Team 2000 stable. During his tenure with NJPW, Hall primarily teamed with Hiroyoshi Tenzan, Satoshi Kojima, Scott Norton, and his other stablemates in a series of tag team matches and six-man tag team matches. Hall wrestled for NJPW until September 2001, with his final bout being a title match against Triple Crown Heavyweight Champion Keiji Muto.

=== Return to WWF/E (2002) ===
On the January 24, 2002, episode of SmackDown!, WWF co-owner Vince McMahon stated that his company had a "cancer", and that he would inject the WWF with a "lethal dose of poison", so he would no longer have to share ownership of the WWF with Ric Flair. He then revealed the "poison" to be the nWo, who would help McMahon destroy his own company, before it could be ruined by anyone else. Six years after defecting from the promotion, Hall returned to the WWF on February 17 at the No Way Out pay-per-view, and was reunited with Kevin Nash and Hollywood Hogan in a repackaged nWo. Later on the February 25 episode of Raw, the nWo attacked Stone Cold Steve Austin, Hall destroyed a cinder block on Austin's leg. On the March 4 episode of Raw, Hall wrestled his first WWF match since May 1996, defeating Spike Dudley.

At WrestleMania X8, Hall lost to Austin, his first loss at a WrestleMania. Later in the night, after Hollywood Hogan had lost to the Rock, Hogan proceeded to shake the Rock's hand out of respect, thus turning his back on the nWo. Hall and Nash then attempted to attack Hogan and Rock, but were promptly dispatched by the duo. Hall and Nash later recruited X-Pac (formerly Syxx and 1-2-3 Kid) into the nWo on the following episode of SmackDown! On the March 25 episode of Raw, Hall was drafted to the Raw brand with the rest of the nWo, as a result of the WWF draft lottery. Hall faced Bradshaw in a match at Backlash, which he won with help from X-Pac. On the next night on Raw, Hall and X-Pac took on Austin and Big Show. Late in the match Big Show chokeslammed Austin and joined the nWo.

On May 5, on a flight back from England (following a tour leading to the Insurrextion pay-per-view) to the United States, retroactively dubbed "The Plane Ride From Hell", Hall became intoxicated. Taralyn Cappellano and Heidi Doyle, who served as flight attendants during the flight, accused Hall and several other wrestlers of behaving in a sexually inappropriate manner during the trip. In Hall's case, he was accused of licking Doyle's face, and making sexual remarks to the two women. The case was ultimately settled out of court. The incident would have renewed interest in September 2021 after it was featured in the documentary series Dark Side of the Ring. Hall's last appearance for the company was the following night on Raw, wrestling in a six-man tag match with Big Show and X-Pac against Austin, Bradshaw and Ric Flair, which ended in a no contest. He was released from the promotion the following day due to ongoing issues stemming from his substance abuse.

=== Total Nonstop Action Wrestling (2002–2005, 2007–2008) ===
Hall worked for Total Nonstop Action Wrestling (TNA) briefly in 2002, appearing on their first pay-per-view event. On the July 31 NWA-TNA PPV, Hall lost to his former WWE rival Jeff Jarrett in a Stretcher match. On the September 18 NWA-TNA PPV, Hall and Syxx-Pac competed in the Tag Team Gauntlet for the Gold Match but did not win. On the September 25 NWA-TNA PPV, Hall and Syxx-Pac defeated Elix Skipper and Brian Lawler. On October 23 NWA-TNA PPV, Hall defeated Jeff Jarrett. On October 30 NWA-TNA PPV, Hall got a shot at the NWA World Heavyweight Championship but lost to Ron Killings. Hall would leave NWA-TNA after his match with Killings.

In late 2004, Hall returned to TNA, along with Kevin Nash, as TNA prepared for their first monthly pay-per-view, Victory Road. Hall joined Nash and Jeff Jarrett in the stable The Kings of Wrestling. On the November 26 episode of Impact, Hall defeated A.J. Styles. At Turning Point, The Kings of Wrestling lost to Randy Savage, Jeff Hardy, and A.J. Styles. On the December 24 episode of Impact, Hall interrupted a "In The Pit with Piper" and confronted Héctor Garza which led to a match a week later on the December 31 episode of Impact where Hall won the match. Hall lost to Hardy at Final Resolution on January 16, 2005. After this, he took some time off.

On the November 1, 2007, episode of Impact!, Kevin Nash "predicted" Hall would be Sting's mystery partner at Genesis. The next week, Hall made his return, rebuffing the romantic advances of Kurt Angle's wife, Karen, then battling Kurt in his dressing room. He stated he was in TNA solely to confront Nash. Hall asked Nash why he was not there to help him in his troubled past, and Nash responded that it was a result of his own nonstop partying and risk of losing his family. Hall then claimed that all was forgiven and the two embraced in the ring. He also revealed that he was not Sting's mystery partner. On the November 15 episode of Impact!, The reunited Outsiders and Samoa Joe began a feud with The Angle Alliance. On the November 29 episode of Impact, Hall and Nash came out to the stage and clapped for Samoa Joe after his match. They were scheduled to compete together at Turning Point, but Hall no-showed. At Turning Point (2008), Hall and the Insane Clown Posse (ICP) were seen in attendance. This was later revealed to have been scripted to occur, as TNA had asked ICP to attend the event, but were unaware of Hall being their guest.

=== Return to the WWC (2007) ===
On July 13, Hall made his return to wrestling for the World Wrestling Council (WWC) as Razor Ramon (though wearing WolfPac themed attire). He wrestled the main event of a WWC Anniversary tour show at the José Miguel Agrelot Coliseum in San Juan, against Carlito. He lost after Apollo interfered on Carlito's behalf.

The next night, Hall won his second World Championship, the WWC Universal Heavyweight Championship, by defeating Carlito and champion Apollo in a Three-Way Dance main event. On August 4 and September 23, Hall successfully defended the title against Eddie Colón. On October 27, managed by Rico Casanova, he retained the title at WWC's Halloween Wrestling Xtravaganza, defeating Orlando "Fireblaze" Colon. Razor Ramon was scheduled to fight on December 14 in Ponce and December 15 in Caguas but did not show up. Hall began to have emotional problems, and with the drink, eventually he could not compete leaving the strap thus his scheduled opponent Biggie Size proclaimed himself champion.

=== Juggalo Championship Wrestling (2007–2009) ===
Hall made his Juggalo Championship Wrestling (JCW) debut on August 12, 2007, at Bloodymania, losing to JCW Heavyweight Champion Corporal Robinson. In this match, Hall took his first ever bump on thumbtacks.

On October 6, 2007, at Evansville Invasion, Corporal Robinson, Hall, and Violent J formed the Juggalo World Order (JWO) stable. At the 2007 Hallowicked After Party, on October 31, Shaggy 2 Dope was introduced as a member of the group. After the main event, special guest referee Nosawa ripped off his referee shirt to reveal that he, too, was a member of the JWO. At Bloodymania II, Hall teamed with Kevin Nash, who proclaimed himself a member of the group. At the 2008 Hallowicked After Party, the JWO inducted its newest member, 2 Tuff Tony.

On November 9, the JWO "invaded" Total Nonstop Action Wrestling's Turning Point PPV, by purchasing front row tickets to the event. They promoted their faction by flashing their JWO jerseys, before being removed from the building. The group expressed interest in "invading" WWE's 2009 Royal Rumble, but were unable, due to filming commitments for Big Money Rustlas in Los Angeles. They have also shown interest in "invading" Ring of Honor and Ultimate Fighting Championship.

=== Return to TNA (2010) ===
On the January 4, 2010, three-hour Monday night live episode of Impact!, Hall and Waltman returned to TNA. That same night, Hulk Hogan made his TNA debut. Hall, Nash and Waltman quickly reformed their alliance, but Hogan kept himself out of the group, claiming "times have changed". The following week, the revived alliance was named "The Band".

Hall was scheduled to team with Nash at Genesis in a match against Beer Money, Inc., but was replaced by Waltman (as Syxx-Pac). In the end, Hall inadvertently cost his stablemates the match. On the next episode of Impact!, Hogan, displeased with the actions of The Band, had security remove Hall and Waltman from the arena, since they were not under contract with TNA. Despite this, Hall and Syxx-Pac continued returning to Impact! to assault various wrestlers. On the February 4 episode, they turned on Nash and beat him down. On the February 11 episode of Impact! Hall and Waltman attacked Kurt Angle until Hogan made the save. On the February 18 episode of Impact! Hall and Waltman had a brawl with Nash and Eric Young. On the February 25 episode of Impact! Hall and Waltman had a brawl with Nash and Young in the parking lot. On the March 15 episode of Impact! Hall defeated Nash in a 5-Min $25,000 challenge after interference from Waltman. At Destination X, Hall and Syxx-Pac faced Nash and Young in a tag team match, with The Band's TNA future on the line. In the end, Nash turned on Young and helped The Band win, earning them contracts with TNA.

On the March 29 episode of Impact!, The Band lost a six-man tag team steel cage match to Eric Young, Rob Van Dam and Jeff Hardy. On the April 5 episode of Impact!, The Band interfered in a match and attacked both Team 3D and The Motor City Machine Guns. On the April 12 episode of Impact!, The Band (Hall, Nash, Waltman) defeated Team 3-D and Jesse Neal in a Street Fight. At Lockdown, Hall and Nash lost to Team 3D in a Steel Cage match. On the May 3 Impact!, Eric Young turned on Team 3D and joined The Band. On May 4, at the taping of the May 13 episode of Impact!, Hall teamed with Nash, cashed in his "Feast or Fired" contract and defeated Matt Morgan to win the TNA World Tag Team Championship. Nash later declared Young one third of the champions, citing the "Freebird Rule".

At Sacrifice on May 16, Hall and Nash defeated Ink Inc. (Jesse Neal and Shannon Moore) to retain the titles. On the June 10 episode of Impact!, The Band defeated Matt Morgan (by himself) to retain their titles and this was Hall's final appearance in TNA. On the June 14 Impact!, The Band was stripped of the Tag Team Championship, due to Hall's real-life legal problems. The next day, it was announced that Hall had been released from TNA after 8 years of working part-time for the company and subsequently retired from professional wrestling.

=== Late career (2010–2021) ===
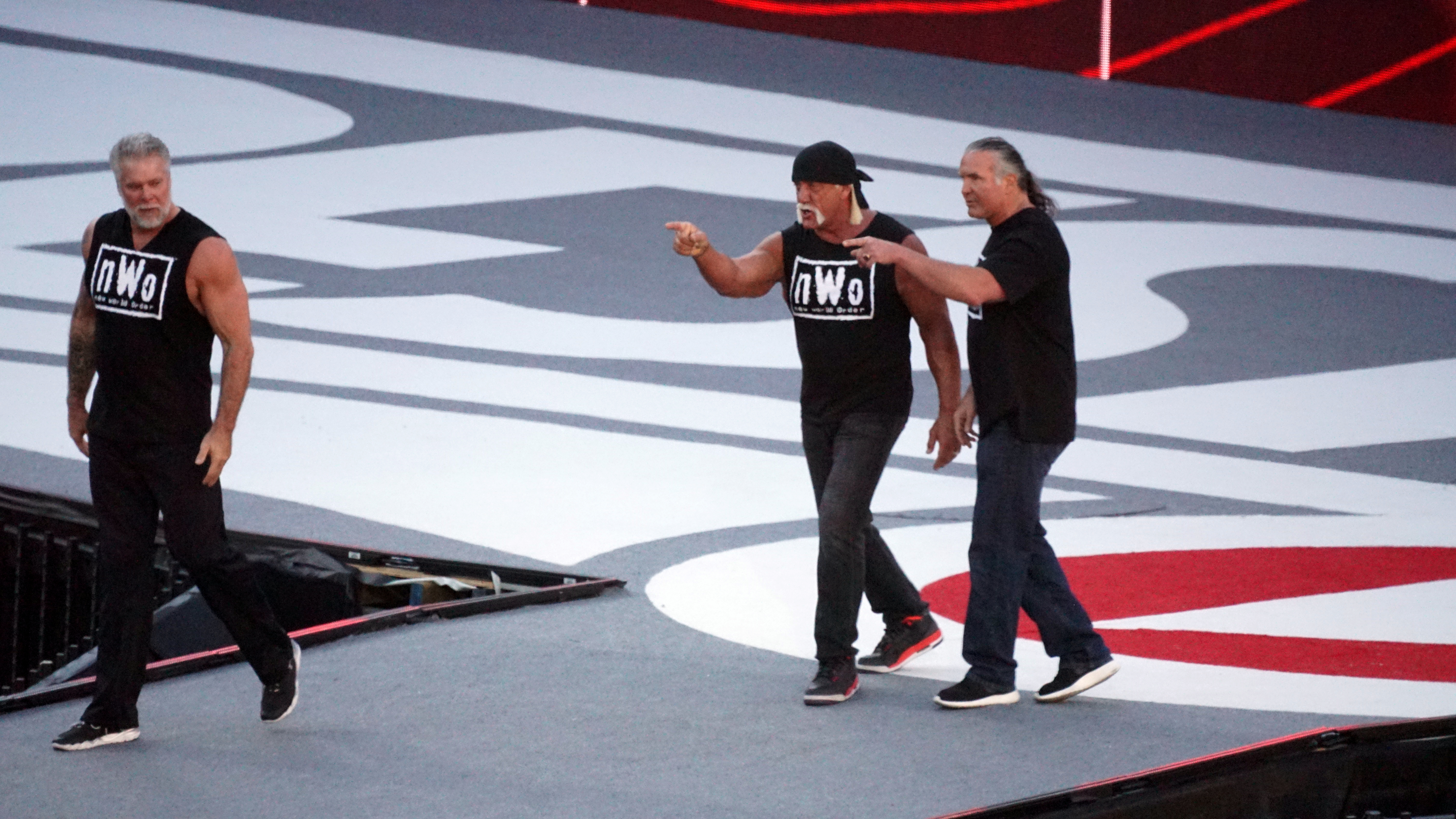
The three original members of the nWo making their way to the ring at WrestleMania 31 in 2015

On March 24, 2014, Razor Ramon was announced as the seventh and final inductee into that year's class of the WWE Hall of Fame. He was inducted in New Orleans on April 5, the night before WrestleMania XXX. Shawn Michaels, Triple H, X-Pac and Kevin Nash joined Hall onstage after his speech, reuniting The Kliq. WWE promotional material for the event referred to him solely as Razor Ramon, without footage or mention of his work under his real name. At WrestleMania XXX, Hall, as Razor Ramon, appeared onstage with the other Hall of Fame inductees. Hall appeared on the August 11, 2014, episode of Raw for the first time since 2002 to reunite the New World Order with Nash and Hulk Hogan to celebrate Hogan's birthday.

On the January 19, 2015, episode of Raw, Hall appeared with X-Pac and Nash to reunite the nWo, and along with the APA and The New Age Outlaws they beat down The Ascension, who had been insulting legends from past years.

At WrestleMania 31 in March 2015, Hall, along with Nash and Hogan, reunited as the nWo to help their old foe Sting in his match against Triple H, who had D-Generation X helping on his behalf. On January 30, 2016, Hall took part in World Association of Wrestling television tapings at Epic Studios in Norwich, England. It was aired on Mustard TV on September 10. In March 2016, Razor Ramon was backstage at WrestleMania 32 celebrating with the new Intercontinental Champion Zack Ryder. The following night on an online Raw Fallout segment, he asked The Miz to give Ryder a rematch for the Intercontinental Championship.

On May 13, 2015, Global Force Wrestling (GFW) announced Hall as part of their roster. On May 18, 2015, Hall was released from GFW.

Hall wrestled his last match on June 17, 2016, defeating Chuck Taylor for the DDT Ironman Heavymetalweight Championship at F1RST Wrestling in Des Moines, Iowa. He would lose the title the same day by forfeit after getting tricked into saying "I give up" off a sheet of paper.

On Raw 25 Years on January 22, 2018, Hall (as "Razor Ramon") returned in a segment featuring D-Generation X, The Bálor Club, and The Revival. Hall also returned to WWE for the RAW Reunion show on July 22, 2019. Hall was inducted into the WWE Hall of Fame a second time as a member of the New World Order, together with stablemates Hulk Hogan, Kevin Nash, and Sean Waltman, as part of the Hall's class of 2020. The induction of the 2020 honorees took place in April 2021 due to the previous year's ceremony being canceled due to the COVID-19 pandemic.

== Personal life and death ==
Hall married Dana Lee Burgio in 1990. They divorced in 1998 due to Hall's drug use. They remarried in 1999 and divorced again in 2001. They had a son named Cody (born 1991), who also became a wrestler, and a daughter named Cassidy (born 1995). In January 2024, Hall became a grandfather posthumously through his daughter. Hall married his second wife, Jessica Hart, in 2006. They divorced in 2007.

Hall's problems with drugs and alcohol were made public in the late 1990s and were incorporated into a controversial WCW storyline. While the storyline was playing out, Hall was legitimately arrested for keying a limousine while intoxicated outside of a night club in Orlando, Florida, causing $2,000 in damages.

After his release from TNA in 2010, Hall checked into rehab paid for by WWE. Hall checked out of the rehab facility in early October 2010. Weeks after he checked into rehab, Hall had both a defibrillator and a pacemaker implanted in his chest. He was hospitalized twice in 2010 for double pneumonia. During this time, Hall started having seizures and was soon diagnosed with epilepsy, resulting in him requiring to take eleven different medications on a daily basis to treat his heart and seizure problems. On April 6, 2011, Hall was reportedly taken to the hospital due to a seizure. Hall's representative, Geena Anac, said Hall was in the hospital that night to be treated for extremely low blood pressure, and that Hall visited his doctor on a regular basis for blood work and checkups while recovering from double pneumonia. Three days later, TMZ reported Hall had been taken to a hospital, treated for cardiac issues and remained in the hospital for three days. According to medical reports, Hall was being treated after overdosing on both opioids and benzodiazepines. During an interview which took place on Kayfabe Commentaries host Sean Oliver's YouShoot segment in 2009, Hall admitted that he had a history of smoking marijuana as well.

Longtime friend Kevin Nash claimed Hall's substance abuse stemmed from post-traumatic stress disorder when he was forced to use an assailant's gun against him in self-defense. In October 2011, ESPN's E:60 featured a documentary detailing Hall's experience with drugs and alcohol. It included interviews with several of Hall's family members including his ex-wife and his son, Cody, as well as several prominent figures and close friends from the wrestling industry such as Hogan, Nash, Waltman, Bischoff, and Stephanie McMahon. In early 2013, former professional wrestler Diamond Dallas Page invited Hall into his home in order for Hall to stay sober and "rebuild his life from the ground up... physically, mentally, professionally, and spiritually". Page also initiated a fundraising drive, which raised nearly $110,000 ($30,000 over their $80,000 goal) to pay for hip replacement surgery and dental work for Hall.

=== Legal issues ===
In 1983, after wrestling a gun away from a man in an altercation outside of a nightclub in Orlando, Florida, Hall was charged with second-degree murder after shooting the man in the head with his own gun. According to Hall, this was done in self-defense. The charges were dropped due to lack of evidence. In a 2011 interview for ESPN, Hall said he was unable to forget the incident.

In 1998, Hall was arrested for groping a 56-year-old woman outside a hotel in Baton Rouge, Louisiana.

On October 10, 2008, Hall was arrested during a roast of The Iron Sheik held at a Crowne Plaza hotel in New Jersey. A comedian, Jimmy Graham, had joked about Owen Hart's death by saying, "After The Sheik and Hacksaw Jim Duggan got caught snorting coke in the parking lot, his career fell faster than Owen Hart." An enraged Hall charged at Graham, knocked down a lectern, grabbed the microphone from Graham, and yelled about how the joke was disrespectful to Hart. Graham described the incident on his MySpace page, claiming Hall was drunk at the time of the attack.

Hall was arrested and charged with disorderly conduct and resisting a police officer on May 14, 2010. Police were called to the Hitching Post Bar in Chuluota, Florida, after Hall "became aggressive". According to the police report, he had been "drinking heavily". When they arrived, they found him yelling and cursing at independent professional wrestling personalities and bar staff. Hall was told he was not allowed to return to the establishment. In his police statement, Hall described himself as an unemployed professional wrestler, despite having a job with TNA Wrestling, who would release him a month later.

On April 6, 2012, Hall was again arrested in Chuluota, Florida. The arrest was later reported to be for a domestic disturbance involving his girlfriend, Lisa Howell; Hall allegedly choked Howell while he was drunk. He was taken to a hospital to be medically cleared prior to being taken to a drunk tank. Hall denied the choking allegations. The prosecutor dropped the charges, citing insufficient evidence.

=== Death ===
In March 2022, Hall was hospitalized after falling and breaking his hip. He was immobile on the floor for days before being discovered during a wellness check by his friend Diamond Dallas Page, who took him to the hospital. After Hall underwent hip replacement surgery, a blood clot was dislodged, and resulted in Hall having three heart attacks on March 12, 2022, after which he was put on life support at WellStar Kennestone Hospital in Marietta, Georgia. He was taken off life support on March 14, 2022, after his family had traveled to the hospital to see him and be with him at his bedside. He died somewhere between 4 and 6 hours later at the age of 63. WWE announced his death later during that day's Raw episode with a tribute video.

Four days after Hall's death, Sean Waltman revealed to the Wrestling Observer Newsletter that Hall had relapsed back into alcohol abuse when the COVID-19 pandemic and resulting lockdowns rendered him unable to have social interactions, and at one point he had dropped weight down to 210 pounds (95 kg) from his usual 287 pounds (130 kg). Waltman also revealed that Hall was in particularly bad shape the night before the 2021 Hall of Fame induction ceremony, and even passed out at a bar. Waltman also stated Hall's condition worsened throughout the two years prior to his death and that he had offered to move in with Hall in February 2022 to help with his health issues. Page also returned to help with Hall's alcoholism.

Hall was buried on April 8, 2022, at Trinity Church Cemetery at St. Mary's, Maryland, his hometown, and the service was attended by fellow wrestlers Kevin Nash, Sean Waltman, Triple H, Shawn Michaels, and Dallas Page.

== Other media ==
During Hall's fourth reign as WWF Intercontinental Champion, he appeared in character as Razor Ramon on The Jerry Springer Show. As part of his appearance, Hall handed the Intercontinental Championship belt, T-shirts, chain necklaces, and tickets to WrestleMania XII to two preteens that had gotten ceremonially—but not legally—married on an episode of the show two years prior. Both of the preteens had AIDS, and one of them was a wrestling fan who liked Ramon. Hall did not work at WrestleMania XII due to his suspension.

On August 24, 2009, Hall began hosting a show on YouTube called Last Call with Scott Hall. Guests included Sid Vicious, Kevin Nash, Ricky Ortiz, Larry Zbyszko, and Sean Waltman.

On August 20, 2013, Hall appeared on HBO's Real Sports with Bryant Gumbel, along with Diamond Dallas Page and Jake Roberts to talk about how he and Roberts had been recuperating since moving in with Page.

In 2015, Hall was a subject in the film The Resurrection of Jake the Snake, which chronicled his time with DDP and Roberts.

== Television ==
Film
Year	Title	Role	Notes
1995	The Jerry Springer Show	Razor Ramon	1 episode
2011	E:60	Himself	Documentary; 1 episode
2010	Big Money Rustlas	Sign Guy	
2013	Real Sports with Bryant Gumbel	Himself	1 episode
2015	Larry King Show	Himself	1 episode
2015	The Resurrection of Jake the Snake	Himself	Documentary
2016	Table for 3	Himself	1 episode
2019	Travelling the Stars: Action Bronson and Friends Watch Ancient Aliens	Himself	1 episode

== Video games ==
WWE video games
Year	Title	Notes
1993	WWF Royal Rumble	Video game debut Cover athlete
1993	WWF King of the Ring	Cover athlete
1993	WWF Rage in the Cage	Cover athlete
1994	WWF Raw	Cover athlete
1995	WWF WrestleMania: The Arcade Game	Cover athlete
2001	WWF With Authority!	
2002	WWE WrestleMania X8	
2013	WWE 2K14	
2014	WWE SuperCard	
2015	WWE 2K16	
2016	WWE 2K17	
2017	WWE Champions	
2017	WWE 2K18	
2018	WWE 2K19	
2019	WWE 2K20	
2022	WWE 2K22	
2023	WWE 2K23	Posthumous release
2024	WWE 2K24	Posthumous release
2025	WWE 2K25	Posthumous release

WCW video games
Year	Title	Notes
1997	WCW vs. nWo: World Tour	Video game debut
1998	WCW Nitro	
1998	WCW/nWo Revenge	
1999	WCW/nWo Thunder	
1999	WCW Mayhem	
2000	WCW Backstage Assault	

== Championships and accomplishments ==
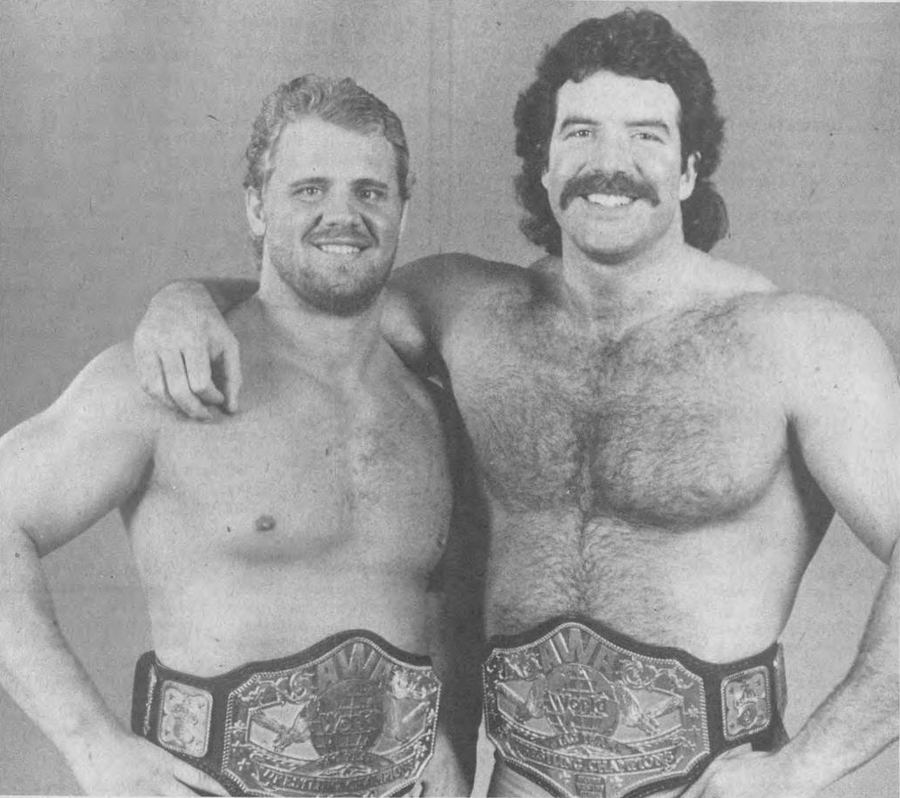
Curt Hennig and Hall were AWA World tag team Champions in 1986

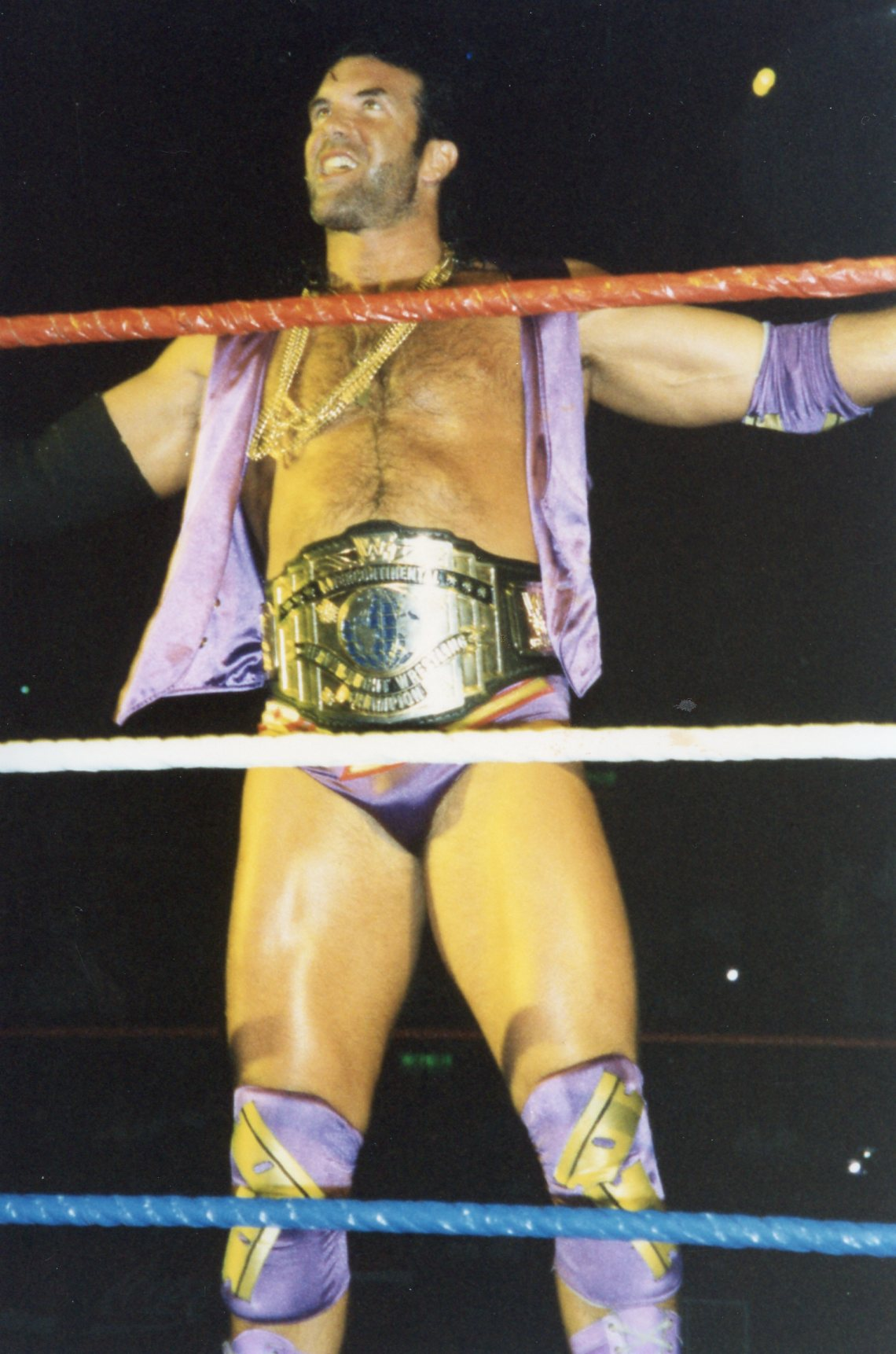
Hall held the WWE Intercontinental Championship four times

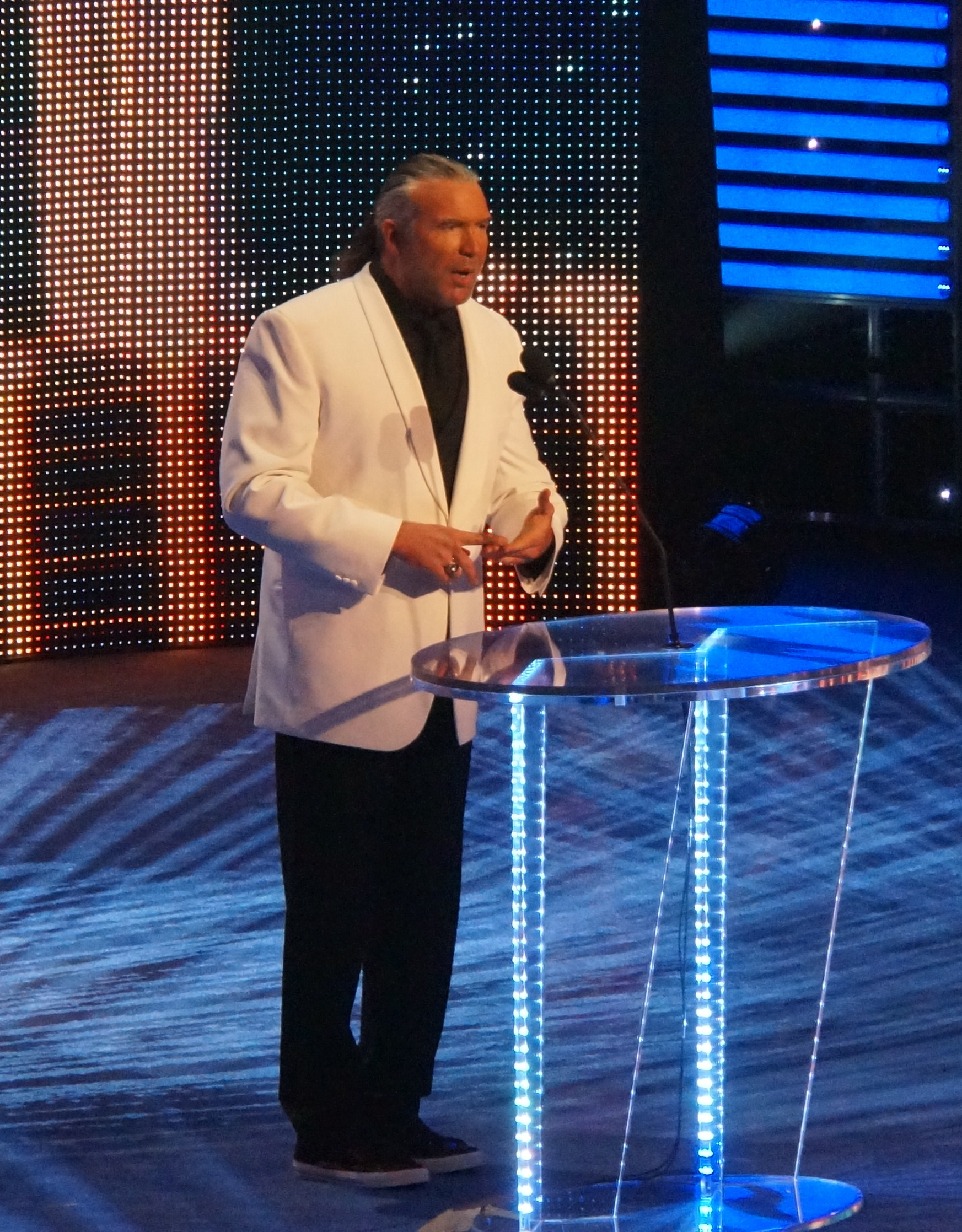
Hall was a two-time WWE Hall of Fame inductee - 2014 individually, and 2020 as a member of the nWo

- American Wrestling Association
  - AWA World Tag Team Championship (1 time) – with Curt Hennig
- DDT Pro-Wrestling
  - Ironman Heavymetalweight Championship (1 time)
- Memphis Wrestling Hall of Fame
  - Class of 2022
- Pro Wrestling Illustrated
  - Match of the Year (1994) vs. Shawn Michaels in a ladder match at WrestleMania X
  - Most Improved Wrestler of the Year (1992)
  - Tag Team of the Year (1997) with Kevin Nash
  - Ranked No. 7 of the top 500 singles wrestlers in the PWI 500 in 1994
  - Ranked No. 72 of the top 500 singles wrestlers of the PWI Years in 2003
  - Ranked No. 40 and No. 98 of the top 100 tag teams of the PWI Years with Kevin Nash and Curt Hennig, respectively, in 2003
- Total Nonstop Action Wrestling
  - TNA World Tag Team Championship (1 time) – with Kevin Nash and Eric Young (Note: Hall defended the championship with either Nash or Young under the Freebird Rule.)
- United States Wrestling Association
  - USWA Unified World Heavyweight Championship (1 time)
- World Championship Wrestling
  - WCW World Television Championship (1 time)
  - WCW United States Heavyweight Championship (2 times)
  - WCW World Tag Team Championship (7 times) – with Kevin Nash (6) and The Giant (1)
  - World War 3 (1997)
- World Wrestling Council
  - WWC Caribbean Heavyweight Championship (1 time)
  - WWC Universal Heavyweight Championship (1 time)
- World Wrestling Federation/WWE
  - WWF Intercontinental Championship (4 times)
  - WWE Hall of Fame (2 times)
    - Class of 2014 – individually
    - Class of 2020 – as a member of the New World Order
  - Slammy Award (2 times)
    - Most Spectacular Match (1994) vs. Shawn Michaels in a ladder match at WrestleMania X
    - Match of the Year (1996) vs. Shawn Michaels at SummerSlam
- Wrestling Observer Newsletter
  - Match of the Year (1994) vs. Shawn Michaels in a ladder match at WrestleMania X
  - Best Gimmick (1996) as a member of New World Order
  - Most Disgusting Promotional Tactic (1998) WCW exploiting his alcoholism in a gimmick

== See also ==
- List of premature professional wrestling deaths
