= WWE Hall of Fame (2015) =

WWE Hall of Fame induction ceremony

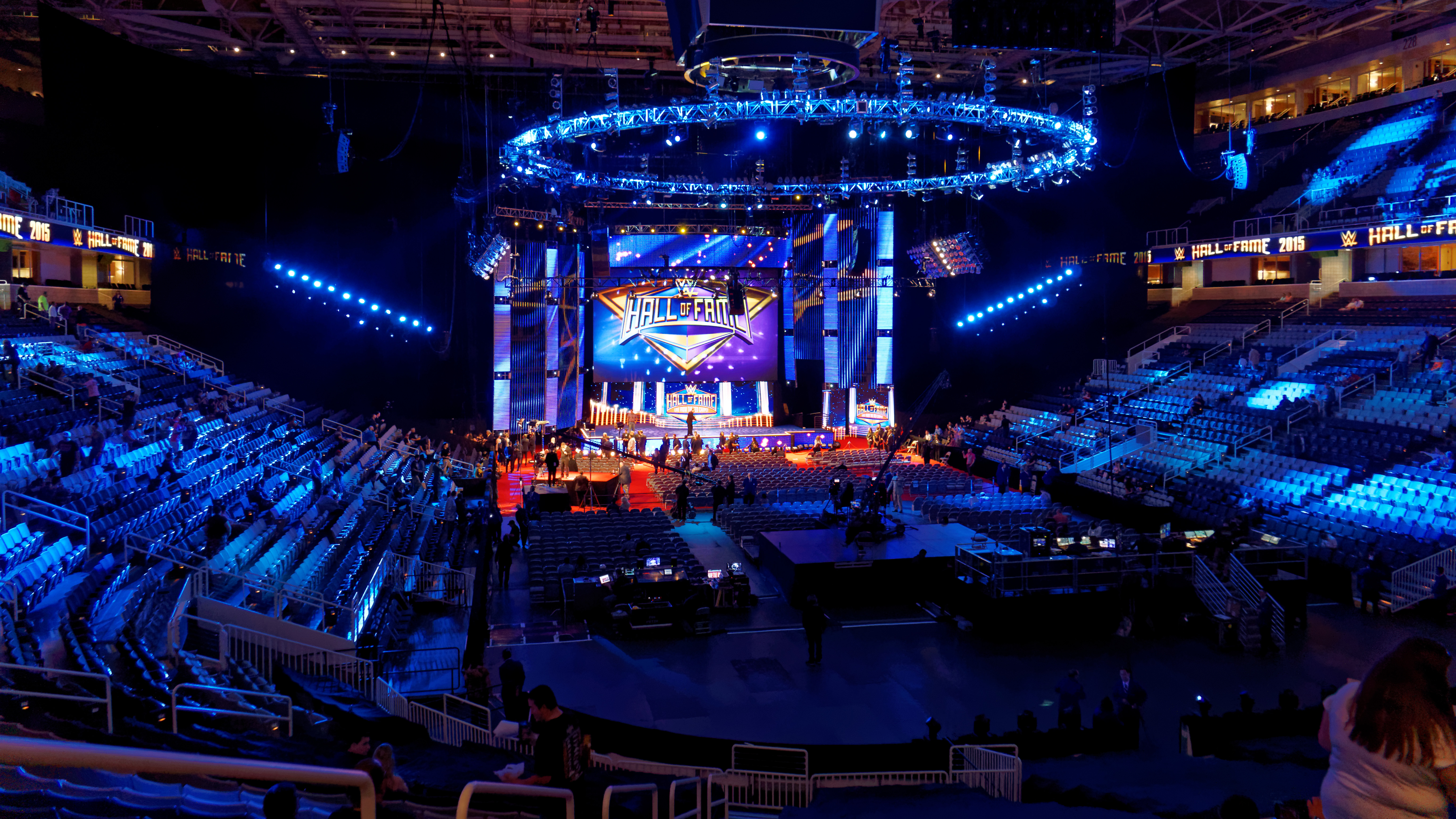
- The 2015 WWE Hall of Fame set
- Promotion: WWE
- Date: March 28, 2015
- City: San Jose, California
- Venue: SAP Center

WWE Hall of Fame chronology
← Previous; 2014	Next → 2016

WWE Hall of Fame (2015) was the event which featured the introduction of the 16th class to the WWE Hall of Fame. The event was produced by WWE on March 28, 2015, from the SAP Center in San Jose, California. The event took place the same weekend as WrestleMania 31. The event aired live on the WWE Network, and was hosted by Jerry Lawler. A condensed one-hour version of the ceremony aired the following Monday after Raw, on the USA Network.

== Event ==
Due to the launch of the WWE Network shortly before WrestleMania XXX, this event featured the second ever "Red Carpet" event as a one-hour pre-show prior to the start of the event. The pre-show was hosted by Michael Cole, Maria Menounos, Byron Saxton and Renee Young.

Rikishi was inducted by his sons The Usos (Jimmy and Jey Uso). The Usos spoke about what it was like growing up with their father's rear end being the focus on TV. Following induction, the three recreated the Too Cool dance, including Jimmy doing The Worm on stage.

Larry Zbyszko was inducted by Bruno Sammartino.

Alundra Blayze was inducted by Natalya. Blayze's husband was in attendance, the first time she saw him in nearly a year due to his active role in the military. During Blayze's speech she asked Natalya to come back out so she could make an old wrong right. Natalya brought with her a metal trashcan which she places beside Blayze. Blayze then pulled several gags out before pulling the WWF Women's Championship belt out of the garbage, which she had throw in the garbage twenty years earlier on Monday Nitro.

Following Ultimate Warrior's death in April 2014, WWE introduced the Warrior Award, in 2015, for those who have "exhibited unwavering strength and perseverance, and who lives life with the courage and compassion that embodies the indomitable spirit of the Ultimate Warrior." The first Warrior Award was given to Connor Michalek and presented by Warrior's wife Dana, as well as Daniel Bryan. The award was accepted by Connor's father Steve.

The Bushwhackers were inducted by John Laurinaitis.

Tatsumi Fujinami was inducted by Ric Flair, during the induction speech Flair spoke about the matches the two had over the years in Japan.

Randy Savage was inducted by long time friend/foe from both WWE and WCW, Hulk Hogan. Due to Savage's death in 2011 he was inducted posthumously, and his award was accepted on his behalf by his brother Lanny Poffo.

Arnold Schwarzenegger was inducted by Triple H.

Kevin Nash was the final inductee, inducted by longtime friend Shawn Michaels. Following the induction they were joined on stage by fellow members of The Kliq, Scott Hall, Sean Waltman and Triple H.

== Inductees ==
=== Individual ===
- Class headliners appear in **boldface**

Image	Ring name (Birth Name)	Inducted by	WWE recognized accolades
	**"Macho Man" Randy Savage** (Randall Poffo)	Hulk Hogan	Posthumous inductee: Represented by his brother Lanny; Two-time WWF World Heavyweight Champion; Four-time WCW World Heavyweight Champion; One-time WWF Intercontinental Heavyweight Champion; 1987 King of the Ring; 1995 World War 3 winner
	Rikishi (Solofa Fatu Jr.)	Jimmy Uso and Jey Uso	One-time WWF Intercontinental Champion; Two-time WWF/World Tag Team Champion; One-time WWE Tag Team Champion
	Alundra Blayze (Debrah Miceli)	Natalya	Three-time WWF Women's Champion; Known in other companies as Madusa, she became the first woman to win the WCW Cruiserweight Championship; One-time AWA World Women's Champion; In 2019, Blayze won the WWE 24/7 Championship once.
	Larry Zbyszko (Lawrence Whistler)	Bruno Sammartino	Two-time AWA World Heavyweight Champion; One-time WCW World Television Champion; One-time WCW World Tag Team Champion; One-time WWWF Tag Team Champion
	Tatsumi Fujinami	Ric Flair	Six-time IWGP Heavyweight Champion; One-time NWA World Heavyweight Champion; One-time WWF International Tag Team Champion; Two-time WWWF/WWF International Heavyweight Champion; Two-time WWF Junior Heavyweight Champion
	Kevin Nash	Shawn Michaels	One-time WWF World Heavyweight Champion; Five-time WCW World Heavyweight Champion; One-time WWF Intercontinental Champion; Nine-time WCW World Tag Team Champion; Two-time WWF Tag Team Champion; 1998 World War 3 winner

=== Tag team ===
Image	Group	Inducted by	WWE recognized accolades
	The Bushwhackers	John Laurinaitis	Known as the Sheepherders prior to joining WWE, they won over 20 regional tag team championships in the AWA, NWA, UWF, and Stampede Wrestling during their 40 year career

=== Celebrity ===
Image	Recipient (Birth name)	Occupation	Inducted by	Appearances
	Arnold Schwarzenegger	Actor, 38th Governor of California	Triple H	Has made numerous appearances on WWE programming

=== Warrior Award ===
Recipient (Birth name)	Presented By	Notes
Connor "The Crusher" Michalek	Dana Warrior; Daniel Bryan	Posthumous recipient/inductee: Represented by his father Steve and brother Jackson. Eight-year-old WWE fan who died of cancer. "Connor's Cure" cancer charity fund established in his honor by Triple H and Stephanie McMahon, run by Children's Hospital of Pittsburgh Foundation
