= WWE Hall of Fame (2014) =

WWE Hall of Fame induction ceremony

- Promotion: WWE
- Date: April 5, 2014
- City: New Orleans, Louisiana
- Venue: Smoothie King Center

WWE Hall of Fame chronology
← Previous; 2013	Next → 2015

WWE Hall of Fame (2014) was the event which featured the introduction of the 15th class to the WWE Hall of Fame. The event was produced by WWE on April 5, 2014, from the Smoothie King Center in New Orleans, Louisiana. The event took place the same weekend as WrestleMania XXX. The event aired live on the WWE Network, and was hosted by Jerry Lawler. A condensed one-hour version of the ceremony aired the following Monday after Raw, on the USA Network.

It was reported by some news outlets that the 2014 class of the WWE Hall of Fame was the most highly anticipated class yet.

== Event ==
Due to the launch of the WWE Network shortly before WrestleMania XXX, this event featured the first ever "Red Carpet" event as a one-hour pre-show prior to the start of the event. The pre-show was hosted by Michael Cole, Maria Menounos, and Renee Young.

After Lita was inducted by Trish Stratus she shared a number of stories about how she started in professional wrestling from Mexico until eventually winding up in the WWE. One story Lita told was how she first met Arn Anderson and her desire to meet Rey Mysterio. Lita expressed that Anderson helped her meet Mysterio in exchange for a Miller Lite. Lita stated she never fulfilled that promise and wanted to now, at which point Stratus return with three Miller Lites, which Lita, Anderson and Mysterio shared.

Jake "The Snake" Roberts was inducted by Diamond Dallas Page. During both of their speeches, the two spoke about Roberts' issues with alcoholism and how he spent many months living with Page and attempting to rehab. Roberts credited DDP Yoga with saving his life. Roberts concluded by thanking his kids for giving him a second chance after all he had put their family through over the years.

Mr. T was inducted by Gene Okerlund into the Hall of Fame.

Paul Bearer was posthumously inducted by Kane. During the induction, Kane shared several stories about traveling with Bearer and about their relationship. Due to Bearer's passing in March 2013 his induction was accepted in his honor by his sons Daniel and Michael Moody. Also The Undertaker made his appearance and pays respect to his manager, Paul Bearer.

Razor Ramon (Scott Hall) was inducted into the Hall of Fame by fellow The Outsider member Kevin Nash. Hall, similar to Roberts, spoke of his person issues with alcohol, and thanks Page for saving his life. Following the introduction two were joined on stage by fellow Kliq members, Triple H, Shawn Michaels and Sean Waltman.

Carlos Colón was introduced by his two sons Carlito, Eddie, and nephew Orlando Colón. Carlito before delivering his speech said that the WWE cut the amount of time he had to speak down, and it made him feel like he never really left the WWE.

The Ultimate Warrior was the final inductee into the 2014, inducted by Linda McMahon. At the end of the Warrior's speech he announced that he had signed a long-term contract that would allow him to serve as an ambassador for the WWE for several years to come.

== Aftermath ==
Although The Ultimate Warrior announced he signed a long-term contract with the WWE, his appearance at Raw the following Monday would be his final WWE appearance. Warrior died on April 8, 2014, in Scottsdale, Arizona. According to reports, Warrior clutched his chest and collapsed at 5:50 p.m. while walking to his car with his wife outside of their hotel in Arizona. He was rushed to the hospital where he was pronounced dead at age 54. Warrior's colleagues said Warrior appeared frail during WrestleMania weekend, and said that he was sweating profusely and breathing heavily backstage.

Following his death, the WWE created the Warrior Award, with the first award given at the 2015 Hall of Fame ceremony. The Warrior Award for those who have "exhibited unwavering strength and perseverance, and who lives life with the courage and compassion that embodies the indomitable spirit of the Ultimate Warrior."

== Inductees ==
=== Individual ===
- Class headliners appear in **boldface**

Image	Ring name (Birth Name)	Inducted by	WWE recognized accolades
	**The Ultimate Warrior** (James Hellwig/Warrior)	Linda McMahon	One-time WWF World Heavyweight Champion; Two-time WWF Intercontinental Heavyweight Champion
	Jake "The Snake" Roberts (Aurelian Smith Jr.)	Diamond Dallas Page	Credited as the inventor of the DDT, held several regional championships
	Lita (Amy Dumas)	Trish Stratus	Four-time WWF/WWE Women's Champion; In 2023, she also won the WWE Women's Tag Team Championship
	Paul Bearer (William Moody)	Kane	Posthumous inductee: Represented by his sons Michael and Daniel; Longtime manager in WCCW (as Percy Pringle III) and in WWE (as Paul Bearer) most notably managing The Undertaker, Mankind and Kane
	Carlos Colón (Carlos Colón González)	Carlito, Eddie, and Orlando Colón	Promoter of World Wrestling Council (WWC) in Puerto Rico; 26-time WWC Universal Heavyweight Champion
	Razor Ramon (Scott Hall)	Kevin Nash	Four-time WWF Intercontinental Champion; Two-time WCW United States Heavyweight Champion; Seven-time WCW World Tag Team Champion; 1997 World War 3 winner

=== Celebrity ===
Image	Recipient (Birth name)	Occupation	Inducted by	Appearances
	Mr. T (Lawrence Tureaud)	Actor	Gene Okerlund	Headlined the first WrestleMania, co-headlined the second, and made appearances and wrestled in WCW (including a match at Starrcade in 1994)
