= WWE Hall of Fame (disambiguation) =

WWE Hall of Fame is an event that honors legendary figures for their contributions to WWE.

WWE Hall of Fame may refer to:

- WWE Hall of Fame (2004), an event introducing 5th class, held on March 13, 2004.
- WWE Hall of Fame (2005), an event introducing 6th class, held on April 2, 2005.
- WWE Hall of Fame (2006), an event introducing 7th class, held on April 1, 2006.
- WWE Hall of Fame (2007), an event introducing 8th class, held on March 31, 2007.
- WWE Hall of Fame (2008), an event introducing 9th class, held on March 29, 2008.
- WWE Hall of Fame (2009), an event introducing 10th class, held on April 4, 2009.
- WWE Hall of Fame (2010), an event introducing 11th class, held on March 27, 2010.
- WWE Hall of Fame (2011), an event introducing 12th class, held on April 2, 2011.
- WWE Hall of Fame (2012), an event introducing 13th class, held on March 31, 2012.
- WWE Hall of Fame (2013), an event introducing 14th class, held on April 6, 2013.
- WWE Hall of Fame (2014), an event introducing 15th class, held on April 5, 2014.
- WWE Hall of Fame (2015), an event introducing 16th class, held on March 28, 2015.
- WWE Hall of Fame (2016), an event introducing 17th class, held on April 2, 2016.
- WWE Hall of Fame (2017), an event introducing 18th class, held on March 31, 2017.
- WWE Hall of Fame (2018), an event introducing 19th class, held on April 6, 2018.
- WWE Hall of Fame (2019), an event introducing 20th class, held on April 6, 2019.
- WWE Hall of Fame (2021) an event introducing 21st and 22nd classes due to COVID-19 pandemic, held on March 30 and April 1, 2021.
- WWE Hall of Fame (2022), an event introducing 23rd classes, held on April 1, 2022.
- WWE Hall of Fame (2023), an event introducing 24th class, held on March 31, 2023.
- WWE Hall of Fame (2024), an event introducing 25th class, held on April 5, 2024.
- WWE Hall of Fame (2025), an event introducing 26th class, hel on April 18, 2025.
