= Ron Simmons =

American football player and professional wrestler (born 1958)

- Simmons at GalaxyCon Des Moines in 2026
- Born: Ronald Kyle Simmons; May 15, 1958 (age 68); Perry, Georgia, U.S.
- Education: Florida State University
- Professional wrestling career
- Ring name(s): Doom #1; Faarooq; Faarooq Asaad; Ron Simmons
- Billed height: 6 ft 2 in (188 cm)
- Billed weight: 270 lb (122 kg)
- Billed from: Warner Robins, Georgia "The Mean Streets" (as Faarooq Asaad)
- Trained by: Hiro Matsuda
- Debut: 1986
- Retired: March 17, 2012
- Football career

Profile
- Position: Defensive tackle

Career information
- High school: Warner Robins (GA)
- College: Florida State
- NFL draft: 1981: 6th round, 160th overall pick

Career history
- Cleveland Browns (1981)*; Ottawa Rough Riders (1981); Tampa Bay Bandits (1983–1985)
- * Offseason or practice squad member only

Awards and highlights
- 2× Consensus All-American (1979, 1980); Florida State Seminoles Jersey No. 50 honored
- College Football Hall of Fame

Ronald Kyle Simmons (born May 15, 1958) is an American former professional wrestler and football player. He is best known for his tenures in WWE and World Championship Wrestling (WCW) where he was the first ever Black American WCW World Heavyweight Champion. Prior to becoming a professional wrestler, Simmons played football as a defensive tackle in the National Football League (NFL), Canadian Football League (CFL) and United States Football League (USFL) for four seasons during the 1980s.

Simmons played college football for the Florida State Seminoles and was recognized as an All-American. He played professionally for the NFL's Cleveland Browns, the CFL's Ottawa Rough Riders and the USFL's Tampa Bay Bandits.

Simmons performed for World Championship Wrestling (WCW) and Extreme Championship Wrestling (ECW) under his real name, and in the World Wrestling Federation / World Wrestling Entertainment (WWF/E) under both his real name and the ring names Faarooq Asaad (sometimes spelled Asad) and Faarooq (sometimes spelled Farooq). In WCW, Simmons was a one-time WCW World Heavyweight Champion; as the first Black American to win the title, he is recognized by WWE as the first black world champion in professional wrestling history. He was also a one-time WCW World Tag Team Champion as one half of Doom with Butch Reed (the longest reign with that championship) and a one-time WCW United States Tag Team Champion with Big Josh. He was one of the most prominent stars in the WWF in the early Attitude Era. In the WWF, he was a three-time WWF Tag Team Champion with Bradshaw as one half of the Acolytes Protection Agency. Simmons was a sporadic world title contender between ECW and the WWF, and led the Nation of Domination stable in the latter promotion. He was inducted into the WWE Hall of Fame Class of 2012.

== Football career ==
=== College career ===
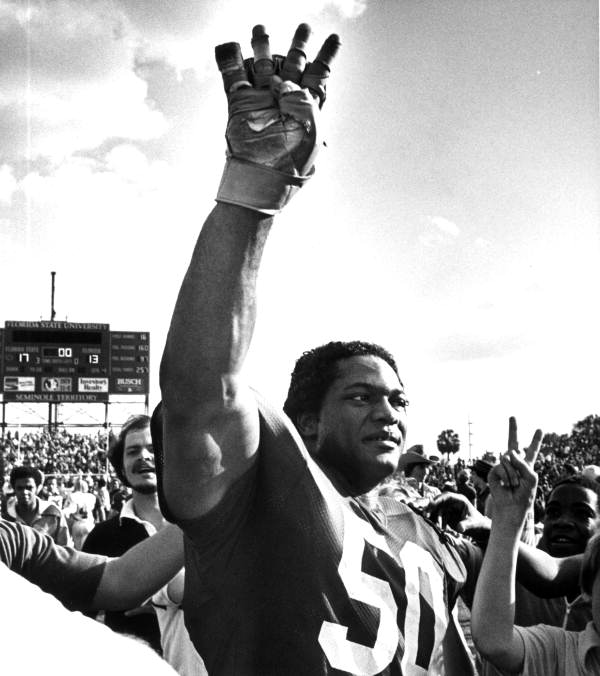
Simmons while playing for Florida State University in 1980.

Ron Simmons was considered one of Florida State's greatest recruiting victories when he signed out of high school. Simmons played four years (1977–1980) as a defensive nose guard at FSU under coach Bobby Bowden (whom Simmons described as "a second father"), earning consensus All-American honors in 1979 and 1980. The Seminoles were 39–8 during Simmons's years at the school, finishing in the Associated Press Top 20 three times ('77, '79 and '80), and earning back-to-back Orange Bowl trips after Simmons's junior and senior seasons.

In 1979 Simmons finished ninth in the Heisman voting behind the winner, Charles White of USC. In 1988, Simmons's jersey (number 50) was retired by FSU, the third time a number has been retired in school history. Simmons was inducted into the Orange Bowl Hall of Fame for his accomplishments while playing at Florida State, and he was elected to the College Football Hall of Fame in 2008.

=== Professional football ===
He had a brief career in the National Football League (NFL). He was selected in the sixth round of the 1981 NFL draft by the Cleveland Browns. However, he was cut on August 25, 1981. He played in six games for the Ottawa Rough Riders of the Canadian Football League in 1981. He was released by the Rough Riders before the start of the season in July 1982. Simmons then played for the Tampa Bay Bandits of the United States Football League from 1983 to 1985, and it was in Tampa where he was a teammate of future professional wrestler Lex Luger.

== Professional wrestling career ==
=== Jim Crockett Promotions / World Championship Wrestling (1986–1994) ===
==== Early years (1986–1988) ====
Simmons joined Jim Crockett Promotions in 1987, appearing on the first show of the Great American Bash tour when he defeated The Tahitian Prince in Lakeland, Florida on July 1. Simmons wrestled only preliminary level competition that summer, but on August 7 he scored the biggest victory of his career when he defeated Ivan Koloff in St Louis. The rookie Simmons defeated the likes of a young Rodney Anoa'i (Yokozuna) and The Barbarian. On the October 24 episode of Power Pro Wrestling, he became involved in his first televised angle when he was attacked by Tiger Conway Jr. and Shaska Whatley in an interview.

He remained undefeated in singles actions until finally losing to Ivan Koloff on a house show at the Omni in Atlanta on February 14, 1988. Simmons was dominant through the first half of the year against lower-level competition on house shows, including Whatley and The Terminator. Simmons teamed with Steve Williams at the 3rd Annual Jim Crockett Sr. Memorial Cup in Greenville, South Carolina on April 22, 1988. They were defeated in the opening round by Mike Rotunda and Kevin Sullivan when Simmons was hit with a foreign object.

==== Doom (1989–1991) ====
Soon after, in March 1989, Simmons began showing signs of a heel turn as he got more aggressive in his matches, including a non-title match against fellow babyface, then-NWA World Heavyweight Champion Ricky "The Dragon" Steamboat and a match on the April 29, 1989 episode of World Championship Wrestling, where he broke the rules during what was supposed to be a face vs. face match against Junkyard Dog. Simmons won the match when the referee, Ron's future manager Teddy Long made a fast count (Long was fired (kayfabe) as referee by Jim Herd immediately following this match). He completed his heel turn on the May 27 episode of World Championship Wrestling during a tag team match, where he teamed with Ranger Ross against the Samoan SWAT Team as part of a tournament for the vacant NWA World Tag Team Championship, leaving him in the ring alone when Long came out. Simmons later teamed up with Butch Reed to form Doom. In the beginning, the members of Doom were masked and only known as Doom #1 and Doom #2, managed by Woman. In their pay-per-view debut at Halloween Havoc 1989, Doom defeated The Steiner Brothers. In the "Iron Team Tournament" at Starrcade '89: Future Shock, Doom finished fourth, losing all three of their matches. Doom's misfortune continued as Woman soon dropped the team to manage The Four Horsemen. Then on February 6, 1990, at Clash of the Champions X, Doom hit rock bottom when they were defeated by Rick and Scott Steiner and as a result of the stipulation were forced to unmask.

With new manager Long, they rebounded and defeated the Steiner Brothers for the NWA World Tag Team Championship at Capital Combat in 1990. They held the title for nine months, defeating teams like the Rock 'n' Roll Express and feuding with The Four Horsemen (becoming tweeners in the process). Among their most memorable encounters during their title reign was a street fight against Horsemen Arn Anderson and Barry Windham at Starrcade '90: Collision Course which ended in a no-contest when Windham pinned Simmons while Reed simultaneously pinned Anderson. During Doom's reign, the titles first became known as the WCW World Tag Team Championship in January 1991. Doom - by then the longest reigning champions of the title's 1975-2001 lifespan - finally lost the titles to the Fabulous Freebirds at WrestleWar '91 in February 1991 after Reed accidentally struck Simmons with a foreign object, enabling Garvin to pin him. After the match Reed and Long turned on Ron Simmons, ending Doom as a team.

Following WrestleWar, Simmons feuded with Reed, defeating him in a cage match at SuperBrawl I in May 1991.

==== World Heavyweight Champion (1991–1992) ====
After the dissolution of Doom, Simmons defeated midcarders including Oz at The Great American Bash in July 1991 and Diamond Studd at Clash of the Champions XVI in September 1991.

At Halloween Havoc in October 1991, Simmons unsuccessfully challenged Lex Luger for the WCW World Heavyweight Championship, losing the best-of-three-falls match one fall to two.

Simmons and Big Josh won the WCW United States Tag Team Championship in January 1992 from the Young Pistols before losing them the following month to Greg Valentine and Terry Taylor. He spent the rest of the first half of 1992 feuding with Cactus Jack.

On August 2, 1992, at a house show in Baltimore, Maryland, a scheduled title match between Sting and WCW World Heavyweight Champion Big Van Vader was canceled after Jake Roberts (kayfabe) injured Sting. WCW President Bill Watts responded by holding a raffle to determine the number one contender. Simmons won the raffle and defeated Vader with a snap scoop powerslam to win the championship. By defeating Vader, Simmons became the first recognized African American WCW World Heavyweight Champion and the second African American wrestler to win a World Heavyweight title.

Simmons held the title for five months. He continued to feud with Cactus Jack, whom he defeated via pinfall at SuperBrawl II. At Clash of the Champions XX: 20th Anniversary in September 1992, Simmons once again defeated Jack. Jack then brought in The Barbarian to challenge Simmons at Halloween Havoc. Reed, embittered at his former partner's success, also issued a challenge to Simmons. The two faced each other in tag matches but Reed was fired before they could have any title bouts. At Starrcade '92: Battlebowl – The Lethal Lottery II, Simmons was scheduled to wrestle Rick Rude, but due to Rude being injured he faced "Dr. Death" Steve Williams instead, wrestling to a double countout that was changed to a disqualification win for Simmons when Williams attacked him after the match. His title reign ended two days later on December 30, 1992, when Vader defeated him to regain the title.

==== Final storylines (1992–1994) ====
After losing the WCW World Heavyweight Champion, Simmons was relegated to mid-card status. He was due to face fellow babyface Dustin Rhodes for the WCW United States Heavyweight Championship at Superbrawl III but was injured and replaced with Maxx Payne. He also unsuccessfully challenged Paul Orndorff for the WCW World Television Championship at Beach Blast.

In late 1993, Simmons turned on protégé Ice Train, becoming a bitter heel who felt like the fans abandoned him after he lost the championship.

In the spring of 1994, Simmons was working for WCW without being signed to a contract. He was briefly managed by Sherri Martel during this time. Simmons competed in the European Cup Tournament, winning his first round match against Marcus Bagwell but lost the next round to Sting. He would go on to feud with Sting and Bagwell, mostly competing in tag matches. His final match was a win over Scott Armstrong on the September 10, 1994 episode of WCW Worldwide.

=== Extreme Championship Wrestling; New Japan Pro-Wrestling (1994–1995) ===
Simmons debuted in Extreme Championship Wrestling (ECW) in September 1994. In November 1994, he began teaming with 2 Cold Scorpio, with the duo unsuccessfully challenging The Public Enemy for the ECW World Tag Team Championship. At November to Remember in November 1994, Simmons unsuccessfully challenged ECW World Heavyweight Champion Shane Douglas. On the December 27 edition of ECW Hardcore TV, Simmons won the Extreme Warfare match. He faced Douglas again in December and January, but was unable to win the title. At Extreme Warfare in March 1995, Simmons defeated Hack Meyers then issued a challenge to 911, who came to the ring and chokeslammed Simmons. The following month at Three Way Dance Simmons lost to Mikey Whipwreck by disqualification after he chokeslammed the referee; following the match, 911 attempted to attack Simmons again, only for Simmons to give 911 a low blow and chokeslam him. At Hostile City Showdown later that month, 911 defeated Simmons after chokeslamming him off the top rope. Simmons made his final appearances with ECW in May 1995.

In January and February 1995, Simmons wrestled in Japan with New Japan Pro-Wrestling (NJPW) as part of its "Fighting Spirit" tour. During the tour, he largely teamed with other American wrestlers such as Flying Scorpio, Mike Enos, and Scott Norton in tag team matches and six-man tag team matches, facing opponents such as Kensuke Sasaki, Masa Saito, Shinya Hashimoto, and Tadao Yasuda. Simmons made a second tour with NJPW in May and June 1995, again teaming with American wrestlers such as Arn Anderson, Mike Enos, and Steve Austin.

Following his appearances with ECW and NJPW, Simmons went into semi-retirement. He began working as a warehouse manager for a Coca-Cola factory on the outskirts of Atlanta, Georgia.

=== World Wrestling Federation / World Wrestling Entertainment ===
==== Nation of Domination (1996–1998) ====
In 1996, Simmons returned to professional wrestling, signing a contract with the World Wrestling Federation (WWF). He made his debut on the July 22, 1996, episode of Monday Night Raw. His first gimmick was that of "Faarooq Asad", a gladiator/street thug who wore a black and blue gladiator outfit with a misshaped helmet and was managed by Sunny. Simmons started his first feud with Ahmed Johnson before shortening his ring name to Faarooq. The feud was started when Faarooq attacked Johnson during a tag team match pitting Johnson and Shawn Michaels against the Smoking Gunns. As a result of the injuries sustained, Johnson vacated the WWF Intercontinental Championship. In the subsequent tournament, Faarooq lost in the finals to Marc Mero.

In November 1996, Faarooq dropped his gladiator gimmick, parted ways with Sunny and formed the Nation of Domination (NOD), a stable loosely based on the Nation of Islam and the Black Panther Party, although the members of the stable were not exclusively African American. They initially feuded with Ahmed Johnson. At the Royal Rumble 1997, Johnson defeated Farooq by disqualification. In the Royal Rumble match, Johnson eliminated himself when he saw Faarooq in the aisle and chased after him. Later in the same match Faarooq was eliminated when Johnson returned and attacked him with a 2x4. At WrestleMania 13 Johnson and the Legion of Doom defeated the NOD in a Chicago Street Fight.

After losing to WWF Champion The Undertaker, at the 1997 King of the Ring, Faarooq blamed Crush and Savio Vega for his loss and threw them out of the NOD. Both formed their rival factions, known respectively as the Disciples of Apocalypse and Los Boricuas, and Faarooq recruited more African American members for the NOD, including half-Samoan Rocky Maivia. The three stables feuded with one another throughout 1997. In the summer of 1997, Faarooq again lost a tournament final for the WWF Intercontinental Championship, this time to Owen Hart after Stone Cold Steve Austin interfered. Austin, who had forfeited the title due an injury inflicted by Hart, wanted Hart to win so he could again beat him for the title.

In early 1998, Faarooq's leadership of the NOD was increasingly challenged by Maivia, who had shortened his name to The Rock and felt he should be the leader as he was now Intercontinental Champion. In the Royal Rumble match, all five NOD members were in the ring at the same time and frequently brawled with each other, Faarooq even eliminating his fellow members D'Lo Brown and Mark Henry; he was one of the final three along with the Rock and Stone Cold Steve Austin. Faarooq wanted the Rock to help him eliminate Austin, but the Rock refused and eliminated Faarooq. The following month at No Way Out of Texas: In Your House, the Nation of Domination lost a 10-man tag team match to Ken Shamrock, Ahmed Johnson, Chainz, Skull and 8 Ball when The Rock submitted to an ankle lock by Shamrock. After the match Faarooq and The Rock almost came to blows. At Wrestlemania XIV, Faarooq and Kama were unsuccessful in the tag team battle royal. Later in the evening, Faarooq was the only NOD member absent from The Rock's title defense against Ken Shamrock. When Shamrock put The Rock in an ankle lock, Faarooq ran down to the ring but decided against helping him and walked off, with the crowd cheering his decision, thus turning him face. The following night on Raw is War, the Rock assumed leadership of the NOD and kicked Faarooq out of the group. Faarooq spent the next several months feuding with his former stablemates. Faarooq feuded with The Rock but failed to win the Intercontinental title at Over the Edge: In Your House. Also this time Simmons then teamed briefly with 2 Cold Scorpio and worked mainly on Shotgun Saturday Night and house shows.

==== Acolytes Protection Agency (1998–2004) ====
After feuding with the Nation, in November 1998, Simmons began teaming with Bradshaw as the Acolytes, a violent tag team sporting occult symbolism on their tights and chests. They were managed by The Jackyl until he left the WWF, at which point they were reintroduced as members of the Ministry of Darkness led by The Undertaker. The Acolytes recruited Dennis Knight (previously part of Southern Justice) and Mabel to the Ministry by kidnapping and brainwashing them (renaming them "Mideon" and "Viscera", respectively), and feuded with The Undertaker's rivals, such as D-Generation X and The Brood, the latter of which later joined the Ministry as well.

During this time the Acolytes had two short reigns as tag team champions; they defeated the team of Kane and X-Pac but lost the title to the Hardy Boyz. At the Fully Loaded pay-per-view in 1999, they won the title back in a no disqualification handicap match against the Hardyz and Michael Hayes. Their second reign ended when they lost the title to Kane and X-Pac.

After the Undertaker suffered an injury in late 1999, the Ministry of Darkness disbanded. Faarooq and Bradshaw continued to team with one another, and eventually adopted the gimmick of two brawlers who enjoyed drinking beer and smoking cigars. After Bradshaw began hiring out the services of the Acolytes as mercenaries and bodyguards, the tag team was renamed the "Acolytes Protection Agency" (APA). Around this time, Faarooq adopted his "Damn!" catchphrase. The team won their third tag team title by defeating the Dudley Boyz in June 2001 but lost the titles the following month to Diamond Dallas Page and Chris Kanyon when Test interfered.

The APA teamed together until 2002, when Faarooq was drafted to the SmackDown! brand. Around this time, Ron Simmons began wrestling under his real name, as the terrorist group Al-Qaeda had a training camp called Al-Faarooq. Simmons had a brief heel run when he teamed with Reverend D-Von until he left television in December 2002, but in June 2003 he returned to WWE with Bradshaw and the APA reunited.

In his last WWE storyline, On the March 18, 2004 episode of Smackdown, he was fired by SmackDown! General Manager Paul Heyman after the APA lost a match WWE Tag Team Champions Rikishi and Scotty 2 Hotty. It was assumed that the APA was fired, but Heyman told Bradshaw he was allowed to stay. Simmons retired from his in-ring career, accusing Bradshaw of not being a faithful friend in storyline. In reality, Simmons, who had been planning to retire due to his health and age, became a backstage agent for the company.

==== Sporadic appearances, "Damn!" and Hall of Famer (2006–present) ====
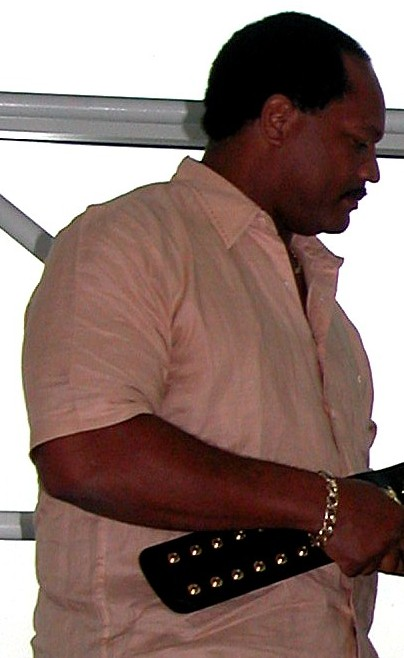
Simmons making a promotional appearance for WWE in 2005.

In 2006, during a rebroadcast of the 1981 Orange Bowl on Sun Sports, Simmons stated that since his retirement from professional wrestling, he would like to continue or even improve his role within WWE. Starting on October 23, 2006, he began making short cameos on Raw to say his catchphrase "Damn", often in awe of or shock at odd occurrences. For a long time it was his only spoken word on a given show.

On the November 20, 2006 edition of Raw, Simmons was chosen by Ric Flair to replace the injured Roddy Piper at the Survivor Series to take on the Spirit Squad. He was the first to be eliminated, via countout. On the January 15, 2007 episode of Raw, he was seen in the ring with Chris Masters in the "Master Lock Challenge", which ended prematurely after interference from Super Crazy. Simmons's escaping the Master Lock, was not recognized. On the July 27, 2007 edition of SmackDown!, Simmons was named the best man for Theodore Long and Kristal's wedding.

Simmons also feuded with Santino Marella. On the September 10, 2007 episode of Raw, Simmons was attacked by Marella. On the September 24, 2007, edition of Raw, Simmons returned to the ring and defeated Santino Marella by countout after Marella left the ring and walked out. Simmons occasionally competed on WWE Heat, taking on jobbers from the town in which the show is being taped. At the end of each match, Simmons held a microphone, pulling it toward and away from his mouth while the crowd cheered him until he eventually uttered his catchphrase. On the December 3, 2007 episode of Raw, Simmons and Bradshaw were hired by Hornswoggle to help him in a no disqualification handicap match against Jonathan Coachman and Carlito.

On Raw's 800th episode on November 3, 2008, Simmons interrupted wrestlers, who were dancing in the ring, with his catchphrase. During the 2008 Slammy Awards, he gave The Great Khali the award for the DAMN Moment of the year. Simmons was released from WWE on January 13, 2009, due to budget cuts but repeatedly reappeared on various WWE events to interrupt awkward situations with his catchphrase. Occasions include episodes of WWE Old School Raw (November 15, 2010 and January 6, 2014) and Raw (May 2, 2011 and January 28, 2013), Hell in a Cell 2012 and WrestleManias 30 and 31.

Simmons would wrestle in the independent circuit from 2008 to 2012. He wrestled his final match on March 17, 2012, teaming with former WWE wrestler Brian Christopher defeating former Nation of Domination stable mates PG-13 (J. C. Ice and Wolfie D) at Crossfire Wrestling in Nashville, Tennessee.

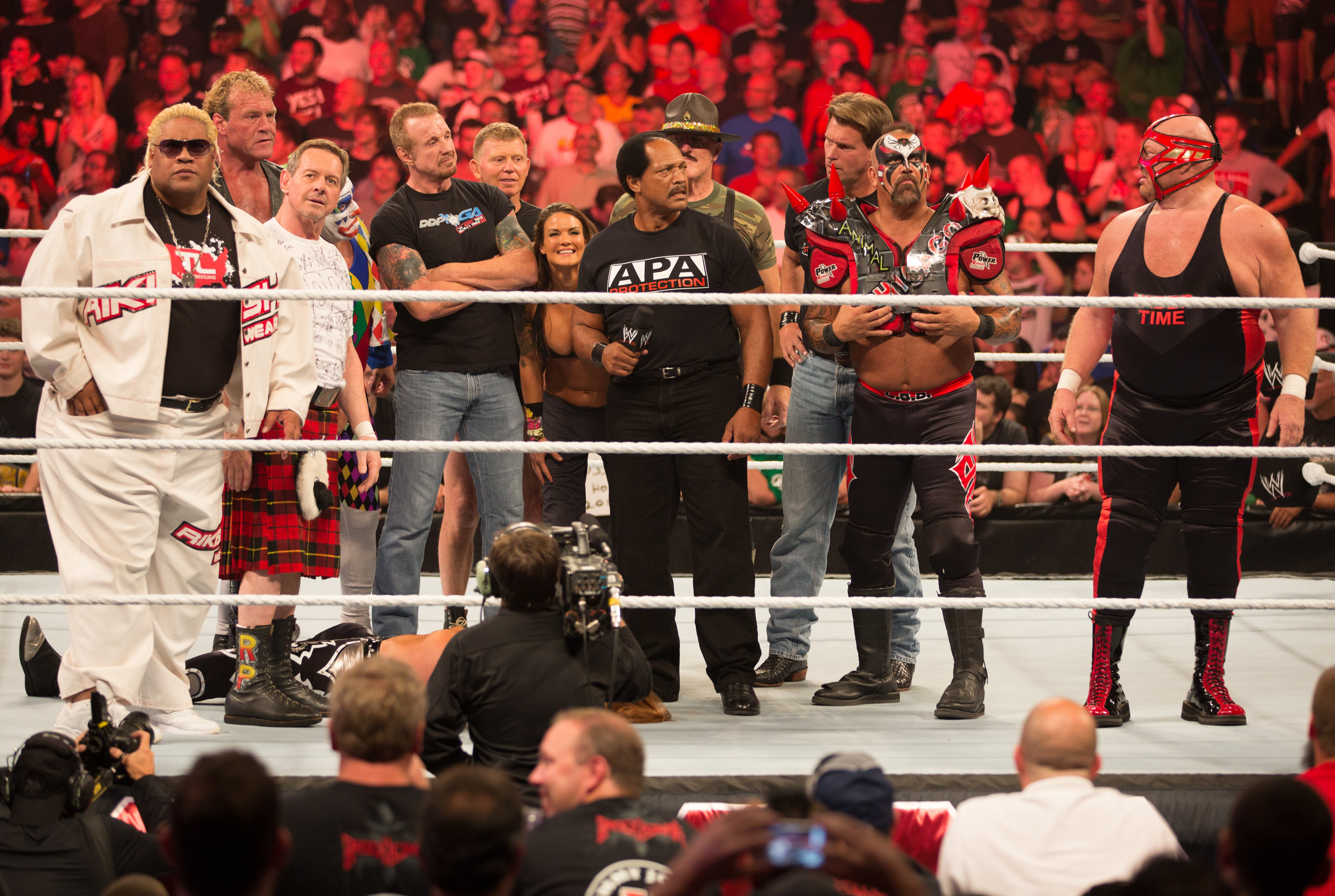
Simmons (center) along with other WWE Legends at Raw 1000.

Simmons was also credited in the tribute as being the first African American world heavyweight champion in WCW. Simmons was acknowledged as a memorable character in WWE's "Attitude Era". On March 31 by his APA partner John "Bradshaw" Layfield. He ended his Hall of Fame speech with his signature "Damn" once again. Simmons and Layfield reunited as the Acolytes Protection Agency (APA) on the 1000th episode of Raw, providing their signature protection and back-up for Lita during her match with Heath Slater. After Layfield hit Slater with the Clothesline from Hell, Simmons took to the microphone exclaiming "Damn!"

In 2012, Simmons was inducted into the WWE Hall of Fame. In 2014, Simmons made several appearances for Maryland Championship Wrestling's "Autumn Armageddon" tour.

On the January 19, 2015 episode of Raw, during a "Raw Reunion" segment, Simmons came out to help the nWo (Scott Hall, Kevin Nash, and Sean Waltman) and The New Age Outlaws (Billy Gunn and Road Dogg) and John "Bradshaw" Layfield against the Ascension (Konnor and Viktor).

Simmons appeared at the Raw 25 Years show on January 22, 2018, and attended the 2018 WWE Hall of Fame ceremony. He also appeared at the Raw Reunion show on July 22, 2019, in a backstage segment involving Mike and Maria Kanellis, Eve Torres, and Jimmy Hart; using Hart's megaphone to exclaim "Damn!"

Simmons also appeared on January 23, 2023, at Raw is XXX when Baron Corbin and JBL won a poker game to win money, but then they lost the money because they had to pay their "taxes". Simmons then came into view shook his head and said "Damn!"

== Other media ==
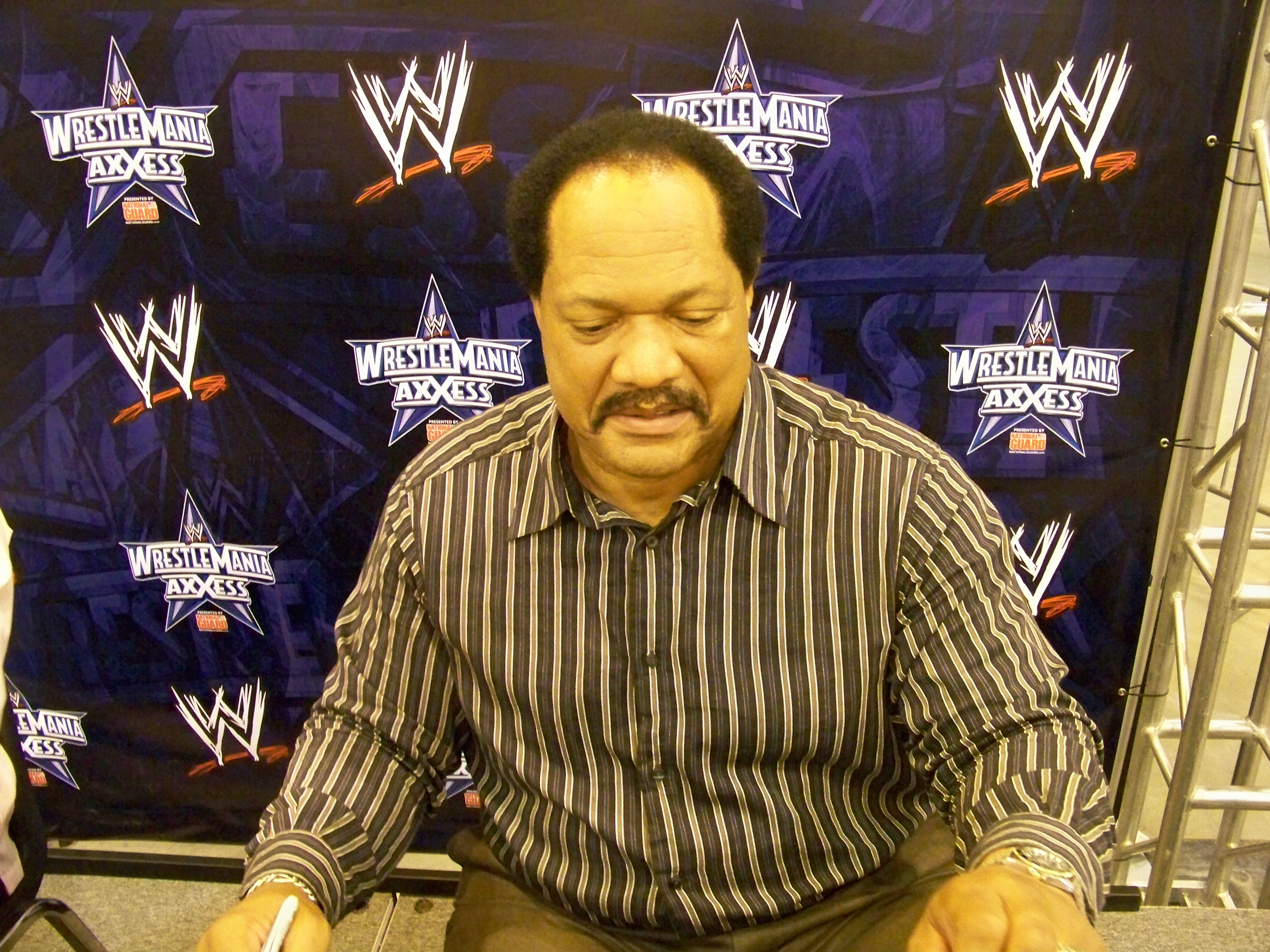
Simmons at the WrestleMania Axxess in 2009

Simmons is a playable character in multiple wrestling video games including WWF War Zone, WWF Attitude, WWF WrestleMania 2000, WWF No Mercy, WWF SmackDown!, WWF SmackDown! 2: Know Your Role, WWF SmackDown! Just Bring It, WWF Road to WrestleMania, WWE WrestleMania X8, WWE SmackDown! Shut Your Mouth, WWE RAW 2, WWE '13, WWE 2K16, and WWE 2K22, ‘’WWE 2K23’’,WWE 2K24” and WWE 2K25.

== Championships and accomplishments ==
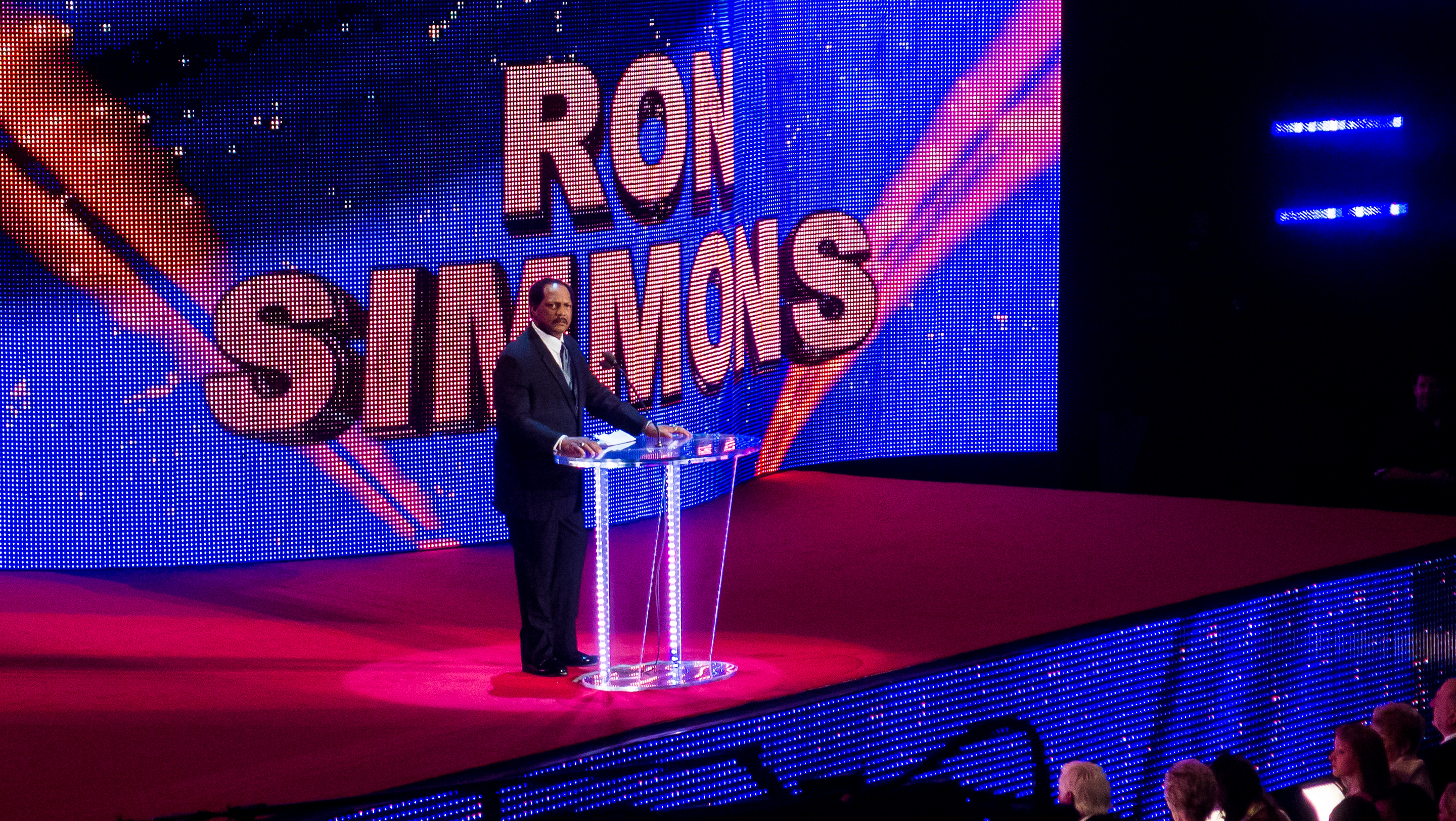
Simmons being inducted into the WWE Hall of Fame in 2012

- Cauliflower Alley Club
  - Lou Thesz/Art Abrams Lifetime Achievement Award (2023)
- Championship Wrestling from Florida
  - NWA Florida Heavyweight Championship (1 time)
- Extreme Championship Wrestling
  - Extreme Warfare (1994)
- George Tragos/Lou Thesz Professional Wrestling Hall of Fame
  - Frank Gotch Award (2025)
- Georgia High School Football Hall of Fame
  - Class of 2025 - as part of 1976 Warner Robins Screamin Demons team
- International Professional Wrestling Hall of Fame
  - Class of 2023
- Memphis Championship Wrestling
  - MCW Southern Tag Team Championship (1 time) – with Bradshaw
- Ohio Valley Wrestling
  - OVW Southern Tag Team Championship (1 time) – with Bradshaw
- Pro Wrestling Illustrated
  - Inspirational Wrestler of the Year (1992)
  - Stanley Weston Award (2021)
  - Ranked No. 20 of the top 500 singles wrestlers in the PWI 500 in 1992
  - Ranked No. 108 of the top 500 singles wrestlers of the "PWI Years" in 2003
  - Ranked No. 91 of the top 100 tag teams of the "PWI Years" with Butch Reed in 2003
- World Championship Wrestling
  - WCW World Heavyweight Championship (1 time)
  - WCW/NWA World Tag Team Championship (1 time) – with Butch Reed
  - WCW United States Tag Team Championship (1 time) – with Big Josh
- World Wrestling Federation / WWE
  - WWF Tag Team Championship (3 times) – with Bradshaw
  - WWE Hall of Fame (Class of 2012)
  - APA Invitational (2003)

== See also ==
- List of gridiron football players who became professional wrestlers
