= Tammy Lynn Sytch =

American professional wrestling personality (born 1972)

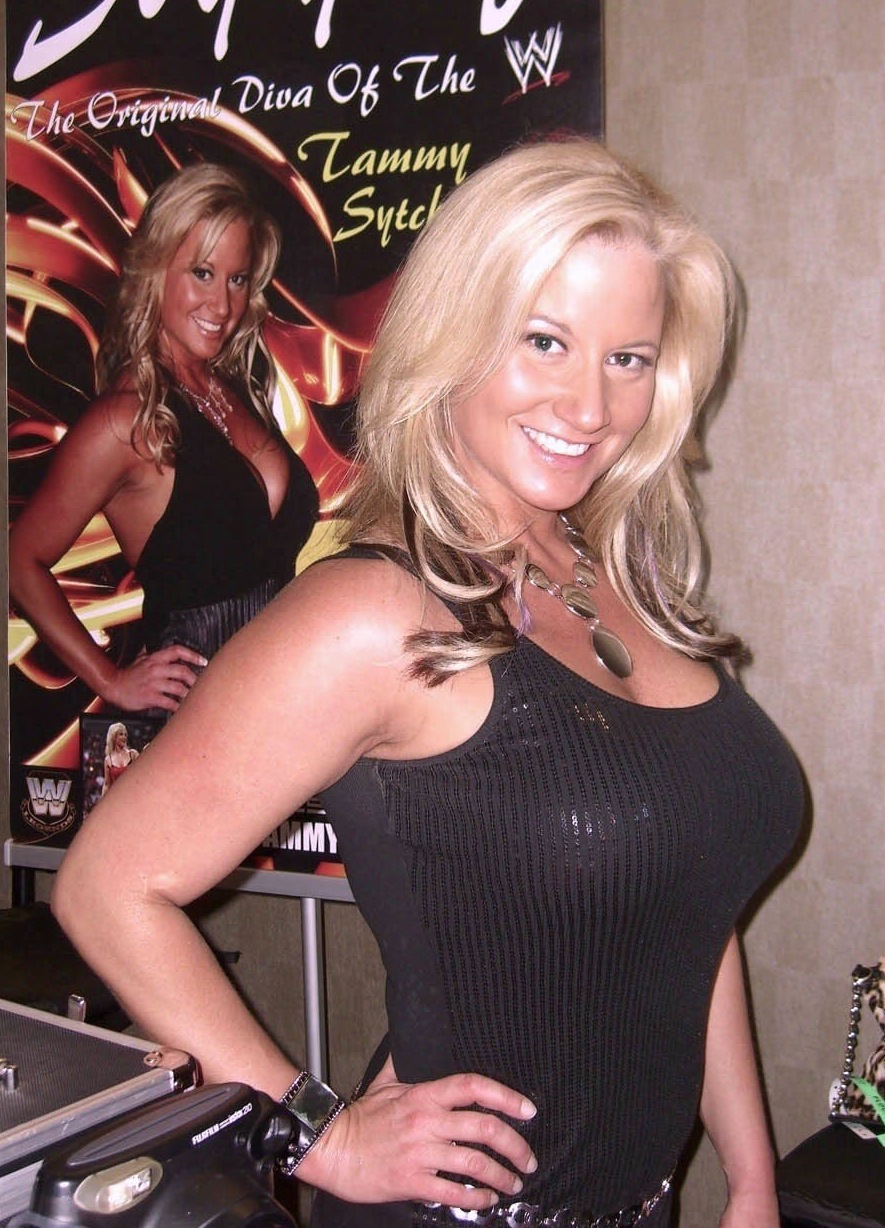
- Sytch in 2010
- Born: Tamara Lynn Sytch; December 7, 1972 (age 53); Matawan, New Jersey, U.S.
- Education: University of Tennessee
- Occupations: Professional wrestling manager; ring announcer; adult entertainer
- Partner: Chris Candido (1990–2005, his death)
- Status: Incarcerated
- Criminal charges: DUI manslaughter; Driving with a suspended license and causing injury or death
- Penalty: 17 years in prison

Details
- Imprisoned at: Lowell Correctional Institution
- Professional wrestling career
- Ring name(s): Tammy Spirit; Tammy Lynn Fytch; Tamara Murphy; Sunny; Tammy Lynn Sytch
- Billed height: 5 ft 4 in (1.63 m)
- Billed weight: 118 lb (54 kg)
- Trained by: Kevin Sullivan; Chris Candido; Jim Cornette
- Debut: 1992
- Retired: 2018

Tamara Lynn Sytch (born December 7, 1972) is an American former professional wrestling personality. She is best known for her time at the World Wrestling Federation (WWF, later WWE) under the ring name Sunny between 1995 and 1998.

Sytch was introduced to the professional industry by her longtime boyfriend Chris Candido, and debuted in the Smoky Mountain Wrestling (SMW) territory in the early 1990s. During the later half of the 1990s, Sytch gained mainstream fame within the World Wrestling Federation (WWF, later WWE) as Sunny, becoming one of the most popular figures in the company during the New Generation Era and early Attitude Era. WWE widely considers Sunny as their first Diva, and America Online named her the most downloaded celebrity on the internet in 1996. After departing the WWF in 1998, she appeared alongside Candido in Extreme Championship Wrestling (ECW) and World Championship Wrestling (WCW). After Candido's 2005 death, Sytch was active on the independent circuit until she retired in 2018. Lauded as one of the greatest managers in WWE history, she was inducted into the WWE Hall of Fame in 2011.

Since 2012, Sytch has been arrested and incarcerated several times, including multiple arrests for driving under the influence (DUI). In November 2023, she was sentenced to seventeen and a half years in prison on DUI and manslaughter-related charges stemming from a fatal March 2022 crash. Although lauded as having "redefined the role of women in WWE", various commentators have noted how her personal controversies have impacted her legacy.

== Early life ==
Tamara Lynn Sytch was born on December 7, 1972, to parents of American and Russian origin. Sytch grew up in a strict family, with a father retired from the United States Navy. Raised in Old Bridge Township, New Jersey, Sytch graduated from Cedar Ridge High School in 1990. Upon entering Smoky Mountain Wrestling in 1993, her fictional "in-character" storyline presented her as having come from studying pre-law at Wellesley College in Massachusetts. She then switched to pre-med at the University of Tennessee, with the ambition to be a plastic or orthopedic surgeon. During her first year of college, she worked as a freelance photographer.

== Professional wrestling career ==
=== Smoky Mountain Wrestling (1992–1995) ===
Sytch started out traveling with her boyfriend Chris Candido to make some extra money. In late 1992, she signed a six-month deal with Smoky Mountain Wrestling. She first appeared onscreen as Tammy Fytch in 1993. She played a villain, who idolized Hillary Clinton. In her first storyline with the company, she threatened to file a sexual discrimination lawsuit due to the lack of prominent positions offered to females. In June 1993, an unnamed Sytch made a cameo appearance at Eastern Championship Wrestling's Super Summer Sizzler Spectacular event. By this time, she had already dropped out of college to pursue her full-time wrestling career.

Sytch managed Brian Lee to the SMW Heavyweight Championship and also began accompanying Candido in his matches. In March 1994, she and Lee faced Dirty White Boy and Dirty White Girl in a series of mixed tag team matches, culminating in a street fight between the two teams at Bluegrass Brawl II in April 1994. In May 1994, she began managing Lee and Candido as a tag team, which won the SMW Tag Team Championship from the Rock 'n' Roll Express. In July 1994, she, Candido, and Lee faced the Rock 'n' Roll Express and Bambi in a series of six-man tag team matches.

Both Sytch and Candido left SMW in early 1995 for jobs with the World Wrestling Federation (WWF).

=== World Wrestling Federation (1994–1998) ===
In late-1994, Sytch was contacted by the WWF, and she began appearing as Tamara Murphy, a commentator for "Live Event News" segments on the WWF Action Zone television show beginning on December 21, 1994. One month later, Candido joined the WWF, and the duo began appearing as Team Spirit (Tammy Spirit and Chris Spirit) and booked as babyfaces, debuting in February 1995 on a WWF Wrestling Challenge taping. They were heavily booed by the crowd after they were recognized for their characters in Smokey Mountain Wrestling, thus turning villainous fitness fanatics. Soon after debuting, they were renamed Sunny and Skip, known collectively as the Bodydonnas. Zip (portrayed by Tom Prichard) later joined the team, and Sunny was in their corner when they won the Tag Team Championship over The Godwinns at WrestleMania XII.

By early-1996, Sunny had turned into a sex symbol and was being heavily pushed in this context by the WWF. On March 10, 1996, Sunny hosted a WWF show called “The Sunny Show” wherein she discussed the upcoming matches at Wrestlemania XII. In that same year, she won Pro Wrestling Illustrated's Manager of the Year Award.

On May 19, 1996, the Godwinns regained the championship, and Sunny turned on the Bodydonnas in favor of the new champions. Later that month at In Your House 8: Beware of Dog, Sunny turned on the Godwinns and helped the Smoking Gunns defeat them for the WWF Tag Team Championship. After the Smoking Gunns lost the title at In Your House 10: Mind Games in September 1996, she fired them in the middle of the ring.

Sytch spent a short time as the manager of Faarooq Asaad, aiding him in his feud over the WWF Intercontinental Championship with Marc Mero and his valet Sable.

Sytch served as a special guest commentator during Rocky Maivia's WWF debut at Survivor Series 1996. Later that year, the internet company AOL announced that Sytch was the most downloaded woman on their website, surpassing various megastar celebrities such as Pamela Anderson, Jennifer Aniston, Mariah Carey and Cindy Margolis. During this time, she was heavily featured on numerous television programs such as MTV's Singled Out and Entertainment Tonight, becoming one of the preeminent figures in the company. On February 24, 1997, Sunny faced Marlena on Monday Night Raw at Manhattan Center in an arm wrestling match that ended in no contest after Sunny threw a powder on Marlena's face. She later managed Savio Vega in his match against Goldust that same night. Sunny would spend the rest of 1997 acting as a host, ring announcer, special guest referee, commentator and timekeeper for several WWF television shows, including WWF LiveWire and Shotgun Saturday Night. Meanwhile, Candido left the WWF for Extreme Championship Wrestling (ECW), and it was not long before she began making guest appearances with him in the promotion. In August 1997, she appeared at ECW's Hardcore Heaven 1997 pay-per-view.

In 1998, Sunny returned from a brief hiatus and became the manager for Legion of Doom 2000, leading them to a win in a Tag Team Championship number one contender battle royal at WrestleMania XIV, turning face for the first time in her career. Sunny would continue to manage them until her final appearance on June 15, 1998. She was released in July 1998 amid rumors of backstage problems with Sable and an addiction to painkillers, as well as no-showing several appearances.

=== Extreme Championship Wrestling (1998–1999) ===
After being released by the WWF in July 1998, Sytch joined Extreme Championship Wrestling (ECW). She made her debut at Heat Wave four days after her WWF release. Now billed as Tammy Lynn Sytch, she assisted Candido in his win over Lance Storm and their subsequent feud. By September, Storm introduced his own valet, a parody of Sytch, Tammy Lynn Bytch; at UltraClash that month, Sytch and Candido defeated Bytch and Storm. Later that year, amid more rumors of drug use, Sytch and Candido took some time off of television.

When the duo returned, Candido re-aligned with Shane Douglas' Triple Threat, and Sytch began a feud with Douglas' manager Francine. The feud was cut short when Sytch was arrested after violating a restraining order filed by her mother. After a brief tour of Australia, she returned in October 1999 on an episode of ECW on TNN, where she talked openly about her past drug issues and reformation. Candido and Sytch left the promotion in December 1999.

=== World Championship Wrestling (2000) ===
In early 2000, both Sytch and Candido signed on with World Championship Wrestling (WCW). Candido debuted in March of that year and Sytch debuted one month later at Spring Stampede, helping him win the WCW Cruiserweight Championship in a match against The Artist Formerly Known as Prince Iaukea. She then feuded with Iaukea's valet Paisley, with Paisley defeating her in a bout on WCW Thunder. The short-lived feud came to a conclusion at Slamboree in May 2000, when The Artist and Paisley stripped Sytch's dress off to reveal her undergarments after Candido defeated The Artist in a singles match.

Sytch and Candido then briefly feuded with Crowbar and Daffney. On the May 15 episode of WCW Monday Nitro, Sytch and Candido faced Crowbar and Daffney in a mixed tag team match with Candido's title on the line, with Daffney pinning Sytch to become the new Cruiserweight Champion. The following day, on WCW WorldWide, Sytch and Candido defeated Mona and Shawn Stasiak. The couple left WCW in June 2000. As in the past, Sytch's departure was surrounded by rumors of drug abuse.

=== Independent circuit (2000–2018) ===
After being released from WCW, the duo landed in Xtreme Pro Wrestling where she managed Candido to a title (the XPW World Heavyweight Title) once again. Candido and Sytch parted ways with XPW and started touring other independent wrestling promotions. In the spring of 2003, Sytch and Candido moved to Puerto Rico and were set to work for Victor Quinones' International Wrestling Association promotion. Sabu convinced them to work for Carlos Colón's rival World Wrestling Council (WWC) promotion instead. After six months, the couple quit the promotion and headed back to the States. Upon their return to the States, both Sytch and Candido briefly lived with former ECW wrestler Hack Myers in his home in Florida.

After the death of Candido, Sytch became regularly involved in the independent circuit again. Sytch made appearances as a referee for NWS Wrestling in May 2005 and attended a Chris Candido Memorial show on June 4, 2005. Also, Sytch was a part of Hardcore Homecoming on June 10, 2005. She first came out with Johnny Grunge and Pitbull #1 to do a tribute to former ECW wrestlers who had recently died. Among those honored were Candido, Pitbull #2, and Rocco Rock. They were interrupted by Danny Doring and Roadkill, but 911 cleared them out of the ring.

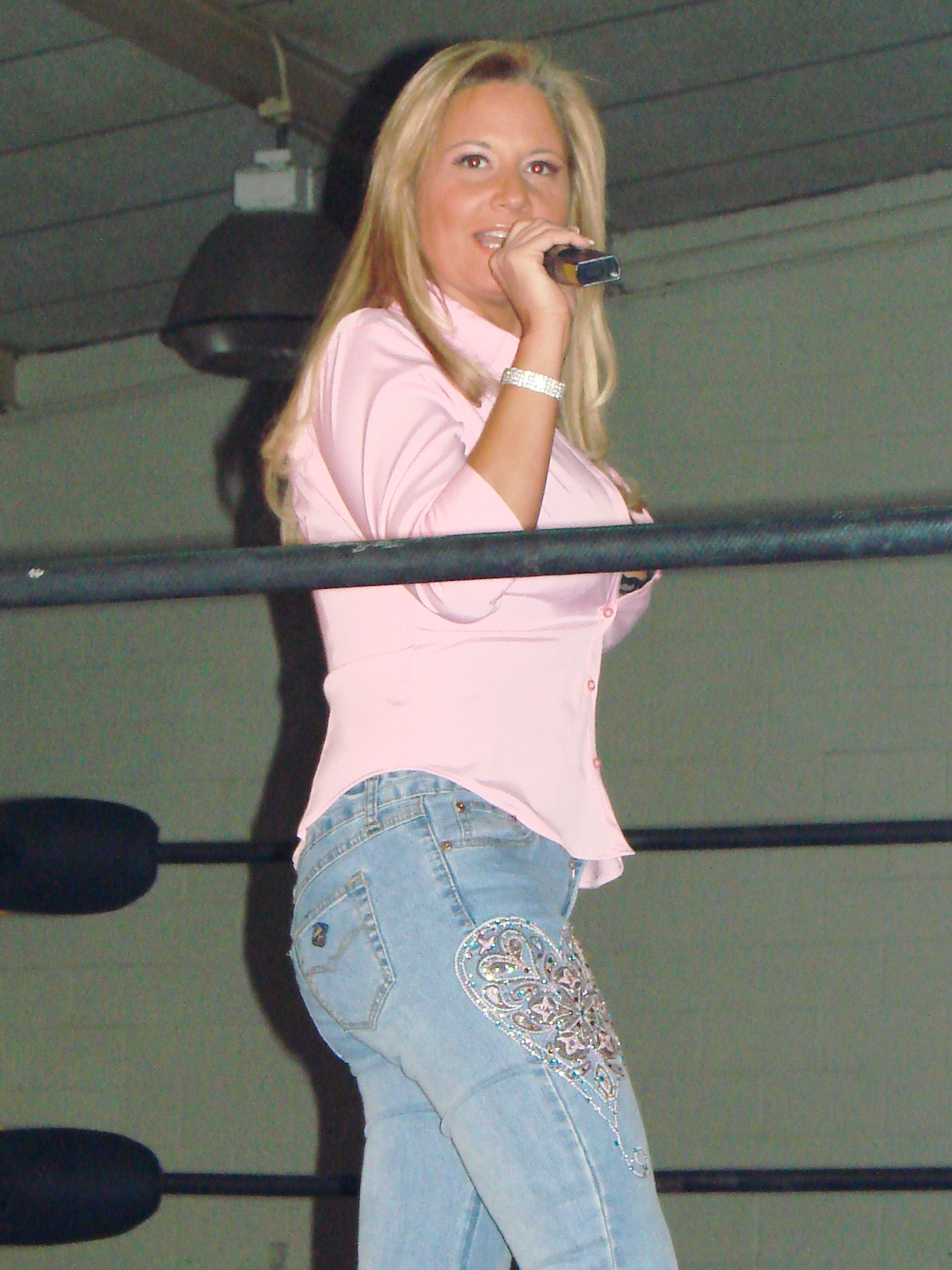
Sytch at a show on the independent circuit in 2008

During this time period, Sytch appeared at the New Jersey–based NWA Cyberspace promotion. Soon after Sytch's departure from NWA Cyberspace, the New Jersey–based National Wrestling Superstars (NWS) became her new primary wrestling promotion. She appeared on a handful the promotion's shows in the summer, and on June 3, 2006, she managed Lex Luger to victory over Johnny Candido. Prior to the bout, a presentation was held from The Manasquan Elks Lodge to the Chris Candido Memorial Fund. The Elks Lodge donated $500 to the fund, with the money being used towards a scholarship for a Manasquan High School student. Sytch returned to NWA Shockwave (formerly NWA Cyberspace) in 2006 as a featured headliner. On December 1, 2006, Sytch was appointed the new commissioner of NWA Shockwave. Immediately following this announcement, Sytch declared all Shockwave championship titles vacant and informed fans that new Heavyweight and Internet Champions would be crowned on January 13.

On December 22, 2007, Sytch won her first championship, the WSU Championship, after defeating the champion Alicia at a Women Superstars Uncensored (WSU) show in Lake Hiawatha, New Jersey, holding the title until March 21, 2008, when she lost the title to Nikki Roxx in a three-way match that also included Alexa Thatcher. Sytch turned heel at WSU's J-Cup Tournament a day later, when she appeared as the villainous manager for Dawn Marie in her first round match against Becky Bayless, which Bayless won via disqualification.

Sytch made an appearance at a Ring of Honor show on December 29, 2007, held at New York City, seated at ringside during a non-title three-way match where Daizee Haze defeated fellow ROH regulars Lacey, and then-Shimmer Champion Sara Del Rey. Upon the conclusion of the match, Lacey verbally assaulted Sytch and accused her of denigrating women's roles in professional wrestling, which supposedly resulted in women's wrestlers not being taken seriously in the industry. She also threatened to assault Sytch, but Haze made the save on Sytch's behalf. Sytch made a few more appearances for ROH in 2008, where she repeatedly offered her services to Austin Aries but was turned down. On the April 12 ROH show, Larry Sweeney announced that he had opened a "Diva School" and invited Sytch to be the trainer, an offer she said she would consider.

Sytch made an appearance at Dynamite Championship Wrestling's 9 Year Anniversary Event in February 2012. She would be the official Host of the Event. She also made an appearance for Pennsylvania Premiere Wrestling on September 14, 2013, at the "Back at It" event in Freeland, Pennsylvania.

A week after being released from jail in October 2018, Sytch announced via Facebook that she would be taking bookings for what she claimed would be her final nine to twelve months of appearances before retiring to a private life.

=== WWE appearances and Hall of Fame (2007, 2009, 2011) ===
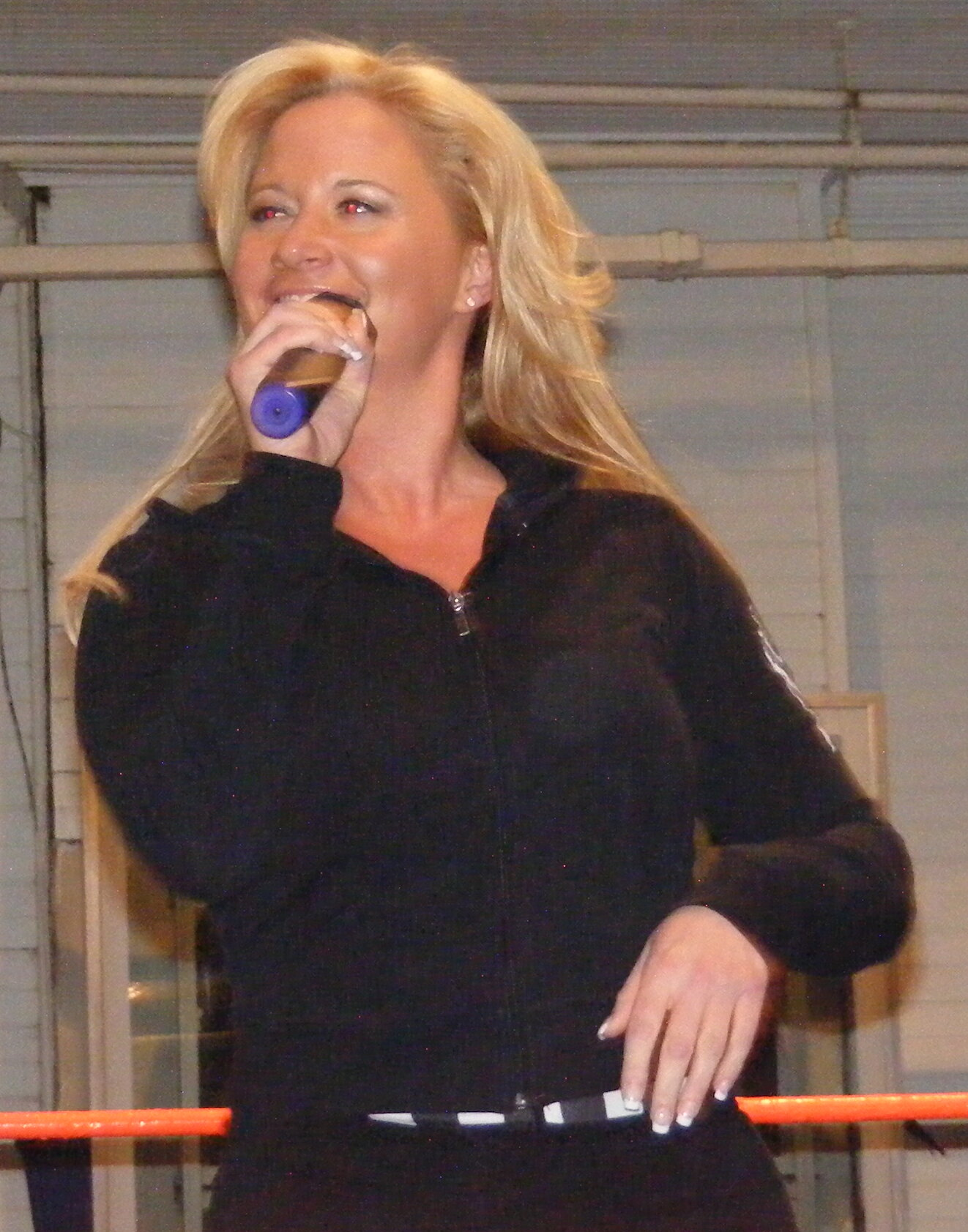
Sytch in 2009

On December 10, 2007, Sytch made a surprise appearance during the 15th anniversary of Raw. She was involved in a segment with Vince McMahon, Stephanie McMahon, Shane McMahon, Triple H, Hornswoggle, Melina and WWE Hall of Famer Mae Young. During this time, she was officially recognized as WWE's original Diva. Sunny, once again, listed as one of the returning legends, participated at WrestleMania XXV on April 5, 2009, in the 25-Diva battle royal for the crown of "Miss WrestleMania", but was eliminated by Beth Phoenix. This was her only official WWE match. Sytch then returned on March 19, 2011, in a house show that took place at Madison Square Garden, where she served as the special guest referee between The Bella Twins against Kelly Kelly and then-Divas Champion Eve Torres. She was inducted into the 2011 class of the WWE Hall of Fame by the entire roster of WWE Divas on April 2, 2011.

== Adult entertainment ==
Sytch has claimed that, in 1997, Playboy had approached her and offered a six-figure sum to pose nude for the magazine. Sytch stated that she declined the offer because she didn't feel that she was emotionally ready to do something like that. Rena "Sable" Mero, with whom Sytch had real-life animosity, later disputed Sytch's claim that she was approached for a possible photo shoot.

From 2001 to 2003, however, Sytch regularly posed nude for Missy Hyatt's adult website Wrestling Vixxxens. In later years, Sytch said she regretted taking part in the website due to money she claimed she never received as well as the sexual actions some of the other models performed in their own photo and video shoots.

In 2016, Vivid Entertainment released a pornographic film featuring Sytch titled Sunny Side Up: In Through the Backdoor.

After being released from prison in 2020, Sytch created an OnlyFans account to upload adult-oriented content.

== Personal life ==
Sytch attended high school at the same time as her long-time boyfriend, Chris Candido, who would later introduce her to the professional wrestling industry. Sytch regularly managed Candido throughout his career until his death in 2005. By 2007, she was once again in school, studying Medical Technology.

Sytch claims to have had a nine-month relationship with Shawn Michaels in the mid-1990s. Sytch was also friends with Bret Hart and would entertain his children whenever they followed him on tour. On one episode of Raw in mid-1997, Michaels accused Hart of having an affair with Sytch; the "sunny days" promo would contribute greatly to the real-life animosity between the two men, to the point where they would eventually have a fight backstage several weeks later. Sytch would walk out of WWE on the night after Survivor Series that year, after WWF owner Vince McMahon double-crossed Hart – who was imminently due to leave for main competitor WCW – and cost Hart the WWF Championship in an unscripted real life incident known as the Montreal Screwjob.

Sytch was rushed to the hospital in 2001 after her appendix burst, which required time off from wrestling to heal. While in jail in 2013, Sytch said that she was diagnosed with cervical cancer, but underwent a hysterectomy and was later diagnosed as cancer free.

She released an autobiography, A Star Shattered: The Rise & Fall & Rise of Wrestling Diva Tammy "Sunny" Sytch, on February 4, 2016.

== Legal issues ==
In 2012, Sytch was arrested five times in a four-week span, for disorderly conduct, third-degree burglary, and three counts of violating a protective order. She was arrested a sixth time in January 2013, also for violating a protective order. Sytch served 114 days in a Connecticut jail and was released in May 2013.

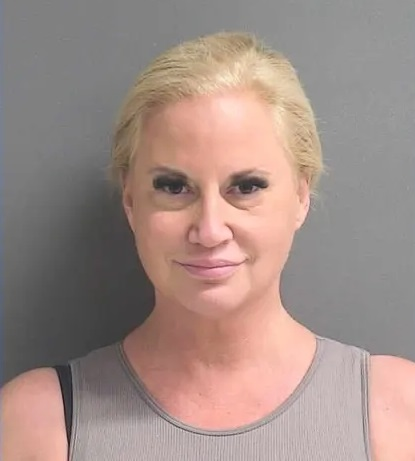
Mugshot taken in May 2022

On May 30, 2015, Sytch was stopped in Mahoning Township, Pennsylvania for driving erratically into a Wal-Mart parking lot. After a blood alcohol content test result showed 0.253 percent, Sytch was arrested. Two days later, on June 1, 2015, Sytch was pulled over and arrested in Lehighton, Pennsylvania after her car crossed the solid center yellow line several times. Sytch was unable to provide proof of insurance or a driver's license and the Pennsylvania State Trooper that pulled her over reported that Sytch's eyes were bloodshot and glassy and that she smelled like alcohol. An open container of beer was found on the passenger side of the vehicle as well as an additional eleven unopened containers. The cap to the open container was found on the passenger's side floor and Sytch's blood alcohol content was 0.3 percent. Less than three weeks later, on June 20, 2015, Sytch drove her car into a ditch in Towamensing Township, Pennsylvania, blaming her GPS for instructing her to make a sudden turn and causing her to drive into the ditch. Pennsylvania State Police noticed the odor of alcohol as well as Sytch's bloodshot eyes, leading them to request a field sobriety test. Sytch refused, claiming that she was in too much pain after falling down steps after recently blacking out. She was placed under arrest and given a blood alcohol test at the police barracks with a result of 0.078 percent. Sytch pleaded guilty to all three charges in January 2016. A judge sentenced her to 90 days in jail on August 18, but counted her 97 days in rehab as time served. However, she was charged with violating her parole that September and remained in jail until February 3, 2017.

Sytch was arrested for two counts of fugitive from justice and six counts of contempt of court on February 27, 2018. She was detained within Monmouth County Correctional Institution and charged for failure to appear in court warrants for both Aberdeen Township, New Jersey and Knowlton Township, New Jersey. Both charges stemmed from DUI citations on both January 23 and February 2, 2018. An additional citation for fleeing the scene of accident was given for the February 2 incident. Her initial bail charge was set at $2,500. The bond on the Aberdeen Township charge was later set to $5,000 while the Knowlton Township bond was set at $1,000 for a total of $6,000. Sytch was extradited back to Carbon County, Pennsylvania due to a bench warrant issued as a result of her probation being revoked for multiple parole violations on August 22, 2017. Sytch faced five years in prison on the Pennsylvania charge after previously being issued a zero-tolerance ultimatum for future probation violations by Judge Joseph J. Matika. Sytch was subsequently extradited to Pennsylvania on March 23 and remained at the Carbon County Correctional Facility in Nesquehoning until she was paroled on October 9, 2018.

A bench warrant was issued for Sytch in Pennsylvania on February 15, 2019, and the Carbon County Probation Department filed a motion to revoke Sytch's October 2018 parole. She was arrested in Seaside Heights, New Jersey later that month for DUI and other driving offenses and subsequently released into the custody of the Holmdel Police Department after it was discovered that she had outstanding warrants in both Holmdel Township and Knowlton Township, New Jersey. She was charged with contempt of court on both warrants. On March 20, Sytch was extradited from Monmouth County back to Carbon County Correctional Facility to address her Pennsylvania charges. After over a year in prison, Sytch was released on February 25, 2020.

Sytch was arrested on July 13, 2020, for allegedly eluding a police officer, contempt/violation of a domestic violence restraining order, and operating a motor vehicle during a second license suspension. She was held at the Monmouth County Correctional Institution, and was released on June 9, 2021, due to a court order.

Sytch was once again arrested on January 13, 2022, in Keansburg, New Jersey, for unlawfully possessing a weapon and making terroristic threats. She was booked into the Monmouth County Correctional Institution, but released the following day after being ordered to check-in weekly with the court. The charges stemmed from an incident in which she allegedly threatened to murder an "intimate partner" with a pair of scissors. If convicted, Sytch faced 11 years in prison. She was arrested again a month later in Keansburg and charged with 11 driving offences, including DUI.

On March 25, 2022, Sytch was involved in a fatal car crash in Volusia County, Florida, that killed a 75-year-old man. According to a police report from the Ormond Beach Police Department, Sytch was driving a 2012 Mercedes-Benz when she crashed into the rear of a 2013 Kia Sorento that had been stopped at a stoplight. Witnesses told police that Sytch was driving at a high speed when she crashed into the Kia Sorento. Sytch was transported to the hospital with unknown injuries and a sample of her blood was taken for analysis. In May 2022, Sytch was arrested on DUI and manslaughter-related charges after toxicology reports found that her blood alcohol content was about 3.5 times the legal limit during the fatal car crash. After initially being released after posting a $227,500 bond, a judge deemed her to be a danger to the community, revoked her bond six days later and returned her to jail. On August 16, 2023, Sytch pleaded no contest to the charges. She was sentenced to seventeen and a half years in prison and eight years probation on November 27, 2023 with credit for her 566 days already spent in jail. Her tentative release date is December 2039.

Sytch was transferred from Central Florida Reception Center in Orlando to Lowell Correctional Institution in Marion County in February 2024. In early 2025, Sytch filed a motion requesting that her consecutive prison sentences be modified to run concurrently. She expressed remorse, cited her work as a teacher's aide at Lowell Correctional Institution, and outlined potential housing and employment arrangements following her release. Judge Karen A. Foxman acknowledged Sytch's rehabilitation efforts but ultimately denied the request.

In October 2026, Sytch filed a motion seeking to overturn her conviction, alleging ineffective assistance of counsel, newly discovered medical evidence, and a potential conflict of interest arising from the fact that the prosecutor in her case and the physician who pronounced the victim dead are married. On October 21, Circuit Judge Christian Miller dismissed the motion for failing to meet procedural requirements. Miller also warned Sytch that successfully overturning her negotiated plea agreement could result in previously dropped charges being reinstated, potentially exposing her to a longer prison sentence of up to 26 years, instead of her existing sentence of 17 years and six months.

== Legacy ==
Sytch became known as WWE's first Diva after her run in the 1990s. During this time, her 1996 bikini issue of Raw Magazine made a record number of sales. Her popularity expanded beyond professional wrestling, as America Online deemed her the most downloaded woman that same year. According to Slam! Wrestling, Sytch's pairings with the Smokin' Gunns and the Godwins made her a "loathed villain, but one of the hottest personalities in WWE."

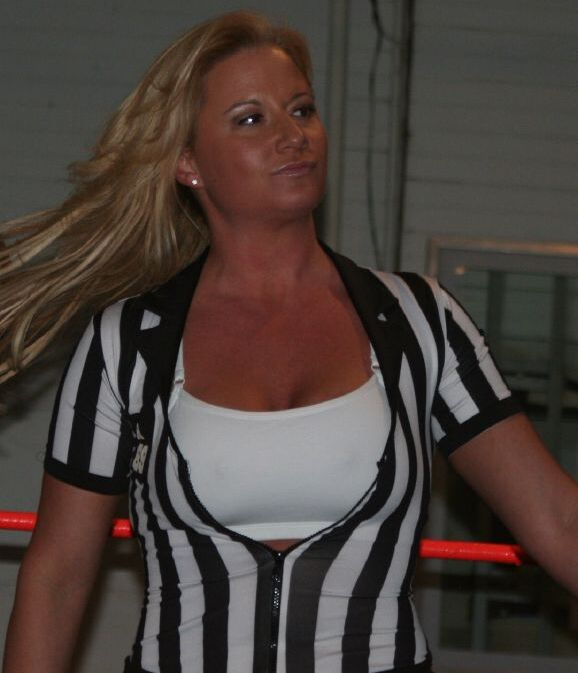
Sytch is recognized as the first "Diva" of WWE.

WWE describe her as "the person who redefined the role of women in WWE", adding: "She wasn't just a brainless bikini model or a vivacious valet at ringside. She was a pinup, a fast-talking manager and could throw down when she needed to. In short, she was sexy, smart and powerful." In 2007, WWE Hall of Famer Mick Foley called Sunny "the pioneer," noting that "a bunch of people [are] walking down the path that she paved." Likewise, in 2011 Natalya Neidhart called her "a trailblazer," in line with Miss Elizabeth, Sensational Sherri and The Fabulous Moolah. For her contributions to the promotion, she was inducted into the WWE Hall of Fame in 2011. That same year, WWE ranked her as the 12th greatest manager of all time, while Ranker listed her as the 11th greatest valet in WWE history. In 2021, WWE Network honored Sytch as one of the prominent female performers who made a significant impact in WWE history.

The Post and Courier columnist Mike Mooneyham described Sytch as having "captivated audiences during her time in the business", but that "substance abuse and backstage drama, and later legal and personal problems, have plagued her over the years." After her 2022 arrest on DUI and manslaughter-related charges, former WWE wrestler Bill DeMott, whose daughter was killed by a drunk driver, called on the promotion to remove her from their Hall of Fame. The call was backed by WWE Hall of Famer Mark Henry. Booker T, who is also a WWE Hall of Famer, objected to this and said that removing her from the Hall of Fame would not actually achieve anything.

Sytch and Candido were featured in a 2023 episode of Dark Side of the Ring. During the episode, Jim Cornette described Sytch's legacy as "a meteoric rise and a meteoric fall".

== Filmography ==
Television
Year	Title	Role	Notes
1994-1995	WWF Action Zone	Tamara Murphy; commentator	Series regular
1996	1996 Slammy Awards	Sunny	TV special
1996	Late Night with Conan O'Brien	Sunny; interviewee	1 episode
1996	WWF LiveWire	Sunny; host	2 episodes
1996	WWF Hall of Fame 1996	Sunny	TV special
1996	Singled Out	Sunny; contestant	1 episode
1996	Entertainment Tonight	Sunny; interviewee	1 episode
1997	WWF Shotgun Saturday Night	Sunny; co-host	4 episodes
1998	Hitman Hart: Wrestling with Shadows	Self; feature	Documentary
2002	Wrestling Gold: Before They Were Famous	Self; feature	Documentary
2008	Wrestlers Rescue	Self; feature	Documentary, direct to DVD
2008	The Bob Show	Self; interviewee	1 episode
2009	WWE Hall of Fame 2009	Sunny	TV special
2010	Card Subject to Change	Self; special thanks	Documentary
2011	WWE Hall of Fame 2011	Sunny; inductee	TV special
2011	E:60	Self; feature	1 episode
2012	The Top 100 Moments in RAW History	Sunny	TV special
2012	GLOW: The Story of the Gorgeous Ladies of Wrestling	Self; special thanks	Documentary
2013	Barbed Wire City: The Unauthorized Story of Extreme Championship Wrestling	Self; feature	Documentary
2014	WWE Rivalries	Self; feature	Documentary, 1 episode
2014	The Monday Night War: WWE vs. WCW	Self; feature	Documentary, 4 episodes
2019	Girl Blood Sport	Self; special thanks	
2019-2023	Dark Side of the Ring	Self; feature	Archive footage, 3 episodes
2020	WWE Timeline	Sunny	Archive footage, 1 episode
2023	Chyna: Wrestling with Demons	Self; feature	Documentary

Video games
Year	Title	Role	Notes
1996	WWF in Your House	Sunny	Unplayable, removed

WWF video compilations
Year	Title	Role	Notes
1996	WWF Superstars Entrance	Sunny	
1996	WWF: What Sunny Wants, Sunny Gets!	Sunny	
1997	WWF 1996: The Year in Review	Sunny	
1997	WWF Best of RAW 4	Sunny	
1998	WWF: D-Generation X	Sunny	
1998	WWF RAW Attitude	Sunny	
2002	WWE Divas: Undressed	Sunny	
2004	Mick Foley's Greatest Hits & Misses: A Life in Wrestling	Tammy Fytch	
2004	The Rise & Fall of ECW	Tammy Lynn Sytch	
2005	Road Warriors: The Life and Death of Wrestling's Most Dominant Tag Team	Sunny	
2005	WWE WrestleMania: The Complete Anthology	Sunny	
2006	The World's Greatest Wrestling Managers	Sunny	
2006	Brian Pillman: Loose Cannon	Sunny	
2007	WWE Royal Rumble: The Complete Anthology	Sunny	
2009	WWE SummerSlam: The Complete Anthology	Sunny	
2011	Shawn Michaels vs. Bret Hart	Sunny	
2011	Stone Cold Steve Austin: The Bottom Line on the Most Popular Superstar of All Time	Sunny	
2012	The Epic Journey of Dwayne "The Rock" Johnson	Sunny	
2013	The Best of WWE in Your House	Sunny	
2013	WWE: Best of WWE at Madison Square Garden	Sunny	
2013	WWE: RAW 20th Anniversary Collection	Sunny	
2014	WWE: The Attitude Era - Vol.2	Sunny	
2017	WWE: Best of 1997 - Dawn of the Attitude	Sunny	

Pornography films
Year	Title	Role	Notes
2001	Wrestling ViXXXens Unleashed	Self; model	Softcore, non sex scenes
2003	Wrestling ViXXXens Wrestlerotica Vol.1	Self; model	Softcore, non sex scenes
2003	Wrestling ViXXXens Exposed	Self; model	Softcore, non sex scenes
2007	Wrestling ViXXXens Untamed	Self; model	Softcore, non sex scenes
2016	Sunny Side Up	Self; actress	

== Championships and accomplishments ==
- America Online
  - AOL Most Downloaded Celebrity (1996)
- Cauliflower Alley Club
  - Other honoree (1996)
- New England Pro Wrestling Hall of Fame
  - Class of 2013
- Pro Wrestling Illustrated
  - PWI Manager of the Year (1996)
- Women Superstars Uncensored
  - WSU Championship (1 time)
- World Wrestling Federation / WWE
  - Slammy Award (2 times)
    - Best Buns (1996)
    - "Minds Behind the Mayhem" for Manager of the Year (1996)
  - WWE Hall of Fame (Class of 2011)
