= WWE Hall of Fame (2012) =

WWE Hall of Fame induction ceremony

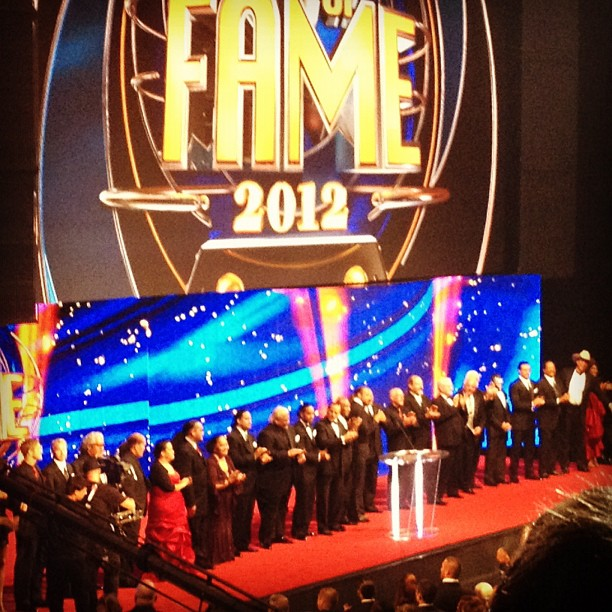
- The WWE Hall of Fame Class of 2012 and their inductors
- Promotion: WWE
- Date: March 31, 2012
- City: Miami, Florida
- Venue: American Airlines Arena

WWE Hall of Fame chronology
← Previous; 2011	Next → 2013

WWE Hall of Fame (2012) was the event which featured the introduction of the 13th class to the WWE Hall of Fame. The event was produced by WWE on March 31, 2012, from the American Airlines Arena in Miami, Florida. The event took place the same weekend as WrestleMania XXVIII. The event was hosted by Jerry Lawler. A condensed one-hour version of the ceremony aired on the USA Network the following Monday, before Raw. In March 2015 the ceremony was added to the WWE Network.

== Event ==
Mil Máscaras was inducted by his nephew and former world champion, Alberto Del Rio.

Ron Simmons was inducted by his former tag team partner as part of The Acolytes Protection Agency, John Layfield. The two shared stories of being on the road together, and Simmons discussed what it was like to be the first black World Heavyweight Champion.

Yokozuna was inducted by his nephews, The Usos, Jimmy Uso and Jey Uso. The Usos discussed their "Uncle Rodney" and their confusion as kids as to why he was dressed as a sumo wrestler and was throwing salt. Due to Yokozuna's death in 2000 he was posthumously inducted by his cousin Rikishi and his family.

The Four Horsemen were next inducted by Dusty Rhodes. Although through the years there were more members, the only ones inducted into the WWE Hall of Fame were "Nature Boy" Ric Flair, Barry Windham, "The Enforcer" Arn Anderson, Tully Blanchard and J. J. Dillon. With this induction Ric Flair became the first person to be inducted twice (an accolade he alone held until 2019 when Shawn Michaels, Bret Hart, and Booker T were all inducted again). Flair was under contract with rival promotion TNA at the time, but they and WWE made a deal so Flair could attend the event in person; the deal saw Christian go the other way for one night later in the year.

Mike Tyson was inducted by D-Generation X members Shawn Michaels and Triple H.

The final inductee was Edge who was inducted by his childhood friend Christian. The two shared stories of coming up through the Canadian wrestling system and their time together in the WWE.

== Inductees ==
=== Individual ===
- Class headliners appear in **boldface**

Image	Ring name (Birth Name)	Inducted by	WWE recognized accolades
	**"The Rated R Superstar" Edge** (Adam Copeland)	Christian	Four-time WWE Champion; A record Seven-time World Heavyweight Champion; Five-time WWF/E Intercontinental Champion; One-time WCW United States Champion; Winner of the inaugural Money in the Bank ladder match Royal Rumble winner (2010); 2001 King of the Ring winner He held the WWF/World and WWE Tag Team Championships a combined 14 times, more than any other wrestler In 2021, he also won the 2021 Royal Rumble
	Mil Máscaras (Aaron Arellano)	Alberto Del Rio	Mexican luchador. Máscaras was the first masked wrestler to perform in Madison Square Garden
	Ron Simmons	John "Bradshaw" Layfield	Recognized by WWE as the First Black World Heavyweight Champion having won the WCW World Heavyweight Championship once Three-time WWF Tag Team Champion
	Yokozuna (Rodney Anoaʻi)	The Usos	Posthumous inductee: Represented by his cousin Rikishi; Two-time WWF World Heavyweight Champion; Two-time WWF Tag Team Champion; 1993 Royal Rumble winner

=== Group ===
Image	Group	Inducted by	WWE recognized accolades
	The Four Horsemen	Dusty Rhodes	One of the top stables of the 1980s, they reached their peak in 1988 when the four members controlled all three major NWA Championships, (World, United States and Tag Team)
"Nature Boy" Ric Flair (Richard Fliehr) – First two-time inductee. Previously inducted in 2008 for his individual career. Barry Windham – One-time NWA World Heavyweight Champion, one-time NWA United States Heavyweight Champion, one-time WCW World Television Champion, four-time NWA/WCW World Tag Team Champion, two-time WWF Tag Team Champion, and won over 20 NWA regional titles. "The Enforcer" Arn Anderson (Martin Lunde) – Four-time NWA/WCW World Television Champion, five-time NWA/WCW World Tag Team Champion, and one-time WWF Tag Team Champion. Tully Blanchard – One-time NWA United States Champion, three-time NWA World TV Champion, two-time NWA World Tag Team Champion, and one-time WWF Tag Team Champion. J. J. Dillon (James Morrison) – Long-time manager in the NWA, former WCW onscreen commissioner

=== Celebrity ===
Image	Recipient (Birth name)	Occupation	Inducted by	Appearances
	Mike Tyson	Professional boxer	D-Generation X (Shawn Michaels and Triple H)	Special guest referee at Wrestlemania XIV; Raw guest host in 2010
