= WWE Hall of Fame (2010) =

WWE Hall of Fame induction ceremony

- Promotion: WWE
- Date: March 27, 2010
- City: Phoenix, Arizona
- Venue: Dodge Theatre

WWE Hall of Fame chronology
← Previous; 2009	Next → 2011

WWE Hall of Fame (2010) was the event which featured the introduction of the 11th class to the WWE Hall of Fame. The event was produced by World Wrestling Entertainment (WWE) on March 27, 2010, from the Dodge Theatre in Phoenix, Arizona. The event took place the same weekend as WrestleMania XXVI. The event was hosted by Jerry Lawler. A condensed one-hour version of the ceremony aired on the USA Network that same evening. In March 2015 the ceremony was added to the WWE Network.

== Inductees ==
=== Individual ===
- Class headliners appear in **boldface**

Image	Ring name (Birth Name)	Inducted by	WWE recognized accolades
	**"The Million Dollar Man" Ted DiBiase**	Ted DiBiase Jr. Brett DiBiase	Four-time Mid-South North American Heavyweight Champion; Creator and two-time holder of the non-sanctioned Million Dollar Championship; Three-time WWF World Tag Team Champion; 1988 King of the Ring. In 2019, Dibiase would win the 24/7 Championship
	Antonio Inoki (Kanji Inoki)	Stan Hansen	Founder of New Japan Pro-Wrestling; Two-time WWWF/WWF World Martial Arts Heavyweight Champion; One-time IWGP Heavyweight Champion
	Wendi Richter	Roddy Piper	Two-time WWF Women's Champion; One-time AWA Women's Champion; One-time NWA United States Women's Champion; Two-time NWA Women's World Tag Team Champion
	Maurice "Mad Dog" Vachon	Pat Patterson	Five-time AWA World Heavyweight Champion
	Gorgeous George (George Wagner)	Dick Beyer	Posthumous inductee: Represented by his ex-wife Betty Wagner; One-time holder of the Boston version of the AWA World Heavyweight Championship; Portrayed as a flamboyant, arrogant, charismatic villain, George is credited with helping establish wrestling on television in the 1940s and 1950s
	Stu Hart	Bret Hart	Posthumous inductee: Represented by his sons Bret, Smith, Bruce, Keith, Wayne and Ross, and his daughters Ellie, Georgia, Alison and Diana. Established Stampede Wrestling in Calgary 1948, and ran it until 1984. Ran "The Dungeon" wrestling school and trained numerous WWE wrestlers. Patriarch of the Hart family.

=== Celebrity ===
Image	Recipient (Birth name)	Occupation	Inducted by	Appearances
	Bob Uecker	Actor; Baseball announcer	Dick Ebersol	Guest interviewer/ring announcer at WrestleMania III and IV
