= WWE Hall of Fame =

Professional wrestling hall of fame and television series

- WWE Hall of Fame logo since 2019
- Formation: March 22, 1993 (33 years ago)
- Members: 262 total inductees 136 Individual inductees 51 Legacy inductees 21 Group inductees (56 wrestlers) (−7 inducted in multiple categories); 15 Celebrity inductees 9 Warrior Award inductees 2 Immortal Moment recipients
- Website: WWE Hall of Fame

The WWE Hall of Fame is a hall of fame which honors professional wrestlers and professional wrestling personalities maintained by WWE. Originally known as the "WWF Hall of Fame", it was created in 1993 when André the Giant was posthumously inducted with a video package as the sole inductee that year. The 1994 and 1995 ceremonies were held in conjunction with the annual King of the Ring pay-per-view events and the 1996 ceremony was held with the Survivor Series event. Since 2004, the promotion has held the ceremonies in conjunction with WrestleMania. Since 2005, portions of the induction ceremonies have aired on television and since 2014, the entire ceremony has aired on WWE's livestreaming platforms.

As of 2026, there have been 262 inductees, with 136 wrestlers inducted individually, 51 Legacy inductees, 21 group inductions (consisting of 56 wrestlers within those groups), 15 celebrities, 9 Warrior Award recipients, and 2 Immortal Moment recipients (a category introduced in 2025 to honor historical matches). Eight wrestlers have been inducted twice in two categories: Ric Flair, Shawn Michaels, Booker T, Scott Hall, Kevin Nash, "Stone Cold" Steve Austin, Triple H, and André the Giant; while two two-time inductees were inducted twice as a member of a group: Sean Waltman (D-Generation X and the New World Order) and Barry Windham (The Four Horsemen and The U.S. Express); while Bret Hart and Hulk Hogan are the only wrestlers to be inducted three separate times in three separate categories. 70 members have been inducted posthumously.

== History ==
The World Wrestling Federation (WWF) established the WWF Hall of Fame in 1993. It was first announced on the March 22, 1993, episode of Monday Night Raw where André the Giant, who had died nearly two months prior, was announced as the sole inductee. In the proceeding two years, induction ceremonies were held in conjunction with the annual King of the Ring pay-per-view events. The 1996 ceremony was held with the Survivor Series event, for the first time in front of a paying audience as well as the wrestlers, after which, the Hall of Fame went on hiatus.

After an eight-year hiatus, the promotion—which was renamed World Wrestling Entertainment (WWE) in May 2002—scheduled the 2004 ceremony to coincide with WrestleMania, establishing the traditional date for all following ceremonies. Highlights of the 2004 ceremony were shown at WrestleMania XX, followed by the inductees appearing on the entrance stage in a condensed ceremony, which would become a Hall of Fame tradition from that point forward. The full version was released on DVD on June 1, 2004. Beginning with the 2005 ceremony, an edited version of the Hall of Fame was broadcast on Spike TV (2005) and on the USA Network (2006–2016); these were broadcast on tape delay. Since 2005, the entire Hall of Fame ceremony has been packaged as part of the annual WrestleMania DVD release, and from 2014, has been broadcast live on the WWE Network streaming service. The 2021 ceremony was pretaped on March 30 and April 1 and aired on April 6. In addition to the WWE Network in international markets, the event also aired on Peacock in the United States after the American version of the WWE Network had merged under Peacock in March that year.

Although a building has never been built to represent the Hall of Fame, WWE has looked into constructing a facility. In 2008, Shane McMahon, then-Executive Vice President of Global Media of WWE, stated that WWE had been storing wrestling memorabilia in a warehouse for years, with all items categorized and dated in case a facility is created. Ric Flair stated in 2020 that WWE was in the process of creating a building for the Hall of Fame and that it would be in Florida in the Orlando area, but plans had been delayed due to the COVID-19 pandemic. In May 2021, WWE president Nick Khan expressed interest about creating a Hall of Fame building.

== Specialty inductees ==
=== Celebrity wing ===
The "celebrity wing" of the Hall of Fame is dedicated to celebrities who have made memorable appearances on WWE programming, and/or have had longtime associations with WWE (or professional wrestling in general), who have been very successful in other fields.

=== Warrior Award ===
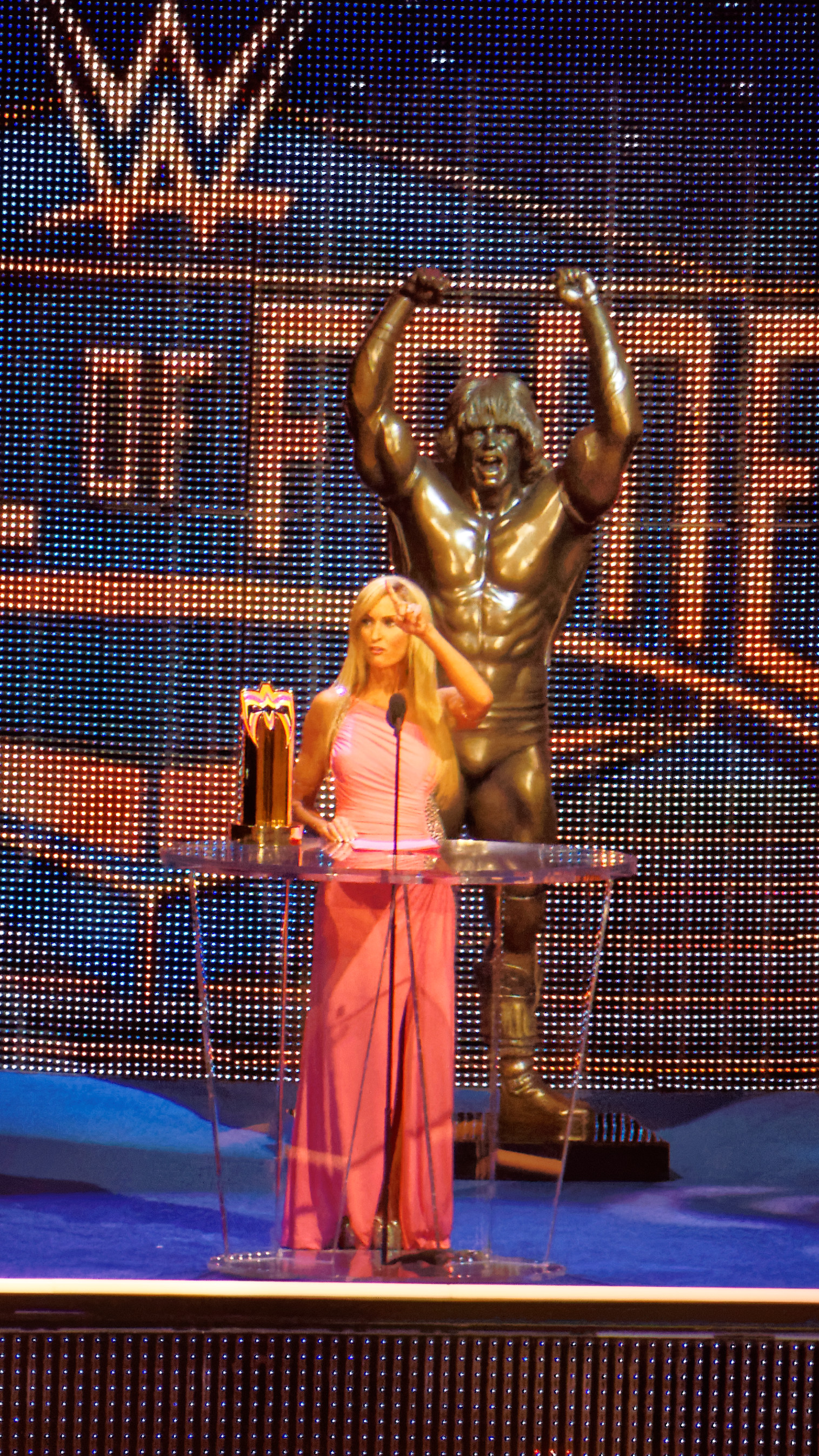
Dana Warrior presents the inaugural Warrior Award at the 2015 Hall of Fame ceremony

In 2015, WWE introduced the Warrior Award for those who had "exhibited unwavering strength and perseverance, and who live life with the courage and compassion that embodies the indomitable spirit of the Ultimate Warrior".

While WWE promoted Warrior Award recipients as Hall of Fame inductees, they were not included in the Hall of Fame section at WWE.com and an image gallery which shows "every WWE Hall of Famer ever" does not contain any recipient.

The award was created following Ultimate Warrior's death. During his April 2014 Hall of Fame speech shortly before his death, he proposed that there be a special category called the "Jimmy Miranda Award" for WWE's behind-the-scenes employees. Miranda, who died in 2002, was part of the WWE merchandise department for more than 20 years. Former WWE ring announcer Justin Roberts expressed disappointment at how WWE used portions of Warrior's Hall of Fame speech to promote the award but left out Warrior's intentions of honoring WWE's off-screen employees. WWE responded, "It is offensive to suggest that WWE and its executives had anything, but altruistic intentions in honoring Connor and his legacy with The Warrior Award", adding that "moving forward the award will be given annually to acknowledge other unsung heroes among WWE's employees and fans". From 2015 until its discontinuation in 2024, all recipients had been influential figures and current or former WWE employees.

Traditionally, Dana Warrior, the widow of Ultimate Warrior, presented the award. Dana Warrior was released from the company in 2023, and as a result, the Warrior Award was discontinued.

=== Legacy inductees ===
In 2016, WWE introduced a new category for the Hall of Fame called the "Legacy" wing. Inductees in this category are from several eras of wrestling history, going back to the early 20th century. All but two inductees, Hisashi Shinma and MSG Network creator Joseph Cohen, have been inducted posthumously. Unlike other inductees, those inducted into the Legacy wing are recognized with a video package rather than a traditional speech.

Previously, Legacy inductees were not announced before the ceremonies and families of posthumous inductees were not notified of their inductions. This practice was criticized by family members of Legacy inductees Bruiser Brody, Ethel Johnson and Stan Stasiak. The Legacy wing was discontinued in 2021, but was reinstated in 2025, now with inductees announced beforehand as well as having their families present and acknowledged at the ceremony.

The Legacy wing has received criticism, specifically regarding the abbreviated way of the inductions. Journalist Dave Meltzer said "this is the category they (WWE) use to honor people who, for whatever reason, they don't feel are marketable names to the modern audience to put in their actual Hall of Fame". Promoter and manager Jim Cornette criticized the fact that recognizable names like Jim Londos or El Santo were part of a video package. Although the post-2025 version invites the families of the inductees to participate in the ceremony, Gunnar Eudy, son of 2026 inductee Sid, described his father's limited induction as "disrespectful as hell" and said the company had "tried to shortchange [him] one last time."

=== Immortal Moment ===
During the March 28, 2025, episode of SmackDown, WWE unveiled a new "Immortal Moment" category for the Hall of Fame, honoring historic and influential matches. The first induction in this new category was Bret Hart vs. "Stone Cold" Steve Austin in a no disqualification submission match with Ken Shamrock as the special guest referee from WrestleMania 13. This induction made Hart the first-ever three-time inductee while also making Austin a two-time inductee.

== Classes ==
=== 1993 ===
WWF Hall of Fame (1993)
- Promotion: WWF
- Date: March 22, 1993
- City: New York City, New York
- Venue: Manhattan Center

WWE Hall of Fame chronology
← Previous; First	Next → 1994

WWF Hall of Fame (1993) was the inaugural class of the WWE Hall of Fame. During the March 22, 1993, episode of Monday Night Raw a video package announcing André the Giant's induction was shown. No ceremony took place, and André was inducted posthumously. In March 2015 a condensed version of the 1994 ceremony was added to the WWE Network. Due to no original ceremony, the 1993 induction of André was discussed by Gene Okerlund and Renee Young as part of the 1994 commentary.

Image	Ring name (Birth Name)	Inducted by	WWE recognized accolades
	**André the Giant** (André Roussimoff)	None	One-time WWF World Heavyweight Champion; One-time WWF World Tag Team Champion

=== 1994 ===
WWF Hall of Fame (1994)
- Promotion: World Wrestling Federation
- Date: June 9, 1994
- City: Baltimore, Maryland
- Venue: Omni Inner Harbor International Hotel

WWE Hall of Fame chronology
← Previous; 1993	Next → 1995

WWF Hall of Fame (1994) was the event that featured the introduction of the second class to the WWE Hall of Fame. The event was produced by the WWF on June 9, 1994, from the Omni Inner Harbor International Hotel in Baltimore, Maryland.

In March 2015 a condensed version of the ceremony was added to the WWE Network. Due to the original ceremony only being partially recorded and not originally intended to air, Gene Okerlund and Renee Young host the program with added commentary.

Image	Ring name (Birth Name)	Inducted by	WWE recognized accolades
	Arnold Skaaland	Shane McMahon	One-time WWWF United States Tag Team Champion and long-time manager of Bruno Sammartino and Bob Backlund in WWF
	Bobo Brazil (Houston Harris)	Ernie Ladd	Seven-time WWWF United States Heavyweight Champion; One-time NWA United States Heavyweight Champion
	Buddy Rogers (Herman Rohde Jr.)	Bret Hart	Posthumous inductee: One-time NWA World Heavyweight Champion and first WWWF World Heavyweight Champion
	Chief Jay Strongbow (Luke Scarpa)	Gorilla Monsoon	Four-time WWWF/WWF World Tag Team Champion
	"Classy" Freddie Blassie	Regis Philbin	Held over 30 NWA regional championships. Long-time manager in WWF
	Gorilla Monsoon (Robert Marella)	Killer Kowalski	Two-time WWWF United States Tag Team Champion; Former WWF announcer and onscreen President
	James Dudley	Vince McMahon	First African American to run a major arena in the United States

=== 1995 ===
WWF Hall of Fame (1995)
- Promotion: WWF
- Date: June 24, 1995
- City: Philadelphia, Pennsylvania
- Venue: Marriott Hotel

WWE Hall of Fame chronology
← Previous; 1994	Next → 1996

WWF Hall of Fame (1995) was the event that featured the introduction of the third class to the WWE Hall of Fame. The event was produced by the WWF on June 24, 1995, from the Marriott Hotel in Philadelphia, Pennsylvania. The event took place the same weekend as King of the Ring.

In March 2015 a condensed version of the ceremony was added to the WWE Network. Due to the original ceremony only being partially recorded and not originally intended to air, Gene Okerlund and Renee Young host the program with added commentary. It has been discovered that the full ceremony has been recorded (albeit with low quality) and has been uploaded on YouTube

The 1995 class featured two posthumous inductees. Antonino Rocca was presented by his wife, and The Grand Wizard was represented by Bobby Harmon.

Image	Ring name (Birth Name)	Inducted by	WWE recognized accolades
	Antonino Rocca (Antonino Biasetton)	Miguel Pérez	Posthumous inductee. One-time WWF International Heavyweight Champion; Pioneer of the acrobatic wrestling style
	Ernie Ladd	Bill Watts	Won several NWA regional titles, and was one of few professional wrestlers to have had a successful career in American football
	George "The Animal" Steele (William Myers)	Pat Myers	One of professional wrestling's first monster heels
	Ivan Putski (Józef Bednarski)	Scott Putski	One-time WWF Tag Team Champion
	The Fabulous Moolah (Mary Ellison)	Alundra Blayze	A three-time WWF Women's Champion. Her first reign is recognized as lasting a record 28 years The first woman to be inducted. In 1999 she won the Women's Championship one more time.
	The Grand Wizard (Ernie Roth)	Sgt. Slaughter	Posthumous inductee. Long-time heel manager in WWF
	Pedro Morales	Gorilla Monsoon	Savio Vega accepted the induction One-time WWWF World Heavyweight Champion whose reign lasted nearly three years The first WWF Triple Crown Champion; He was also the first Latino to win the world title

=== 1996 ===
WWF Hall of Fame (1996)
- Promotion: WWF
- Date: November 16, 1996
- City: New York City, New York
- Venue: Marriott Marquis

WWE Hall of Fame chronology
← Previous; 1995	Next → 2004

WWF Hall of Fame (1996) was the event which featured the introduction of the fourth class to the WWE Hall of Fame. The event was produced by the WWF on November 16, 1996, from the Marriott Marquis in New York City, New York. The event took place the same weekend as Survivor Series.

In March 2015 a condensed version of the ceremony was added to the WWE Network. Due to the original ceremony only being partially recorded and not originally intended to air, Gene Okerlund and Renee Young host the program with added commentary.

Due to Vincent J. McMahon's death in 1984, he was posthumously inducted by the McMahon family.

Image	Ring name (Birth Name)	Inducted by	WWE recognized accolades
	Jimmy "Superfly" Snuka	Don Muraco	One-time NWA United States Heavyweight Champion; Two-time NWA World Tag Team Champion; Two-time ECW Heavyweight Champion
	Johnny Rodz (John Rodriguez)	Arnold Skaaland	Wrestled in WWF for nearly two decades
	Killer Kowalski (Edward Spulnik)	Triple H	One-time WWWF World Tag Team Champion, held 17 NWA regional championships
	"Captain" Lou Albano	Joe Franklin	One-time WWWF United States Tag Team Champion; As a manager, he led 13 different tag teams to a record 17 tag team titles, and four singles wrestlers to various championships His association with Cyndi Lauper was pivotal in turning professional wrestling into a mainstream phenomenon
	Mikel Scicluna	Gorilla Monsoon	One-time WWWF World Tag Team Champion; One-time WWWF United States Tag Team Champion
	Pat Patterson (Pierre Clermont)	Bret Hart	One-time and first WWF Intercontinental Heavyweight Champion, one-time AWA World Tag Team Champion and held over 20 NWA regional championships Credited as the creator of the Royal Rumble match Patterson won the WWF Hardcore Championship in 2000 and the WWE 24/7 Championship in 2020
	Vincent J. McMahon	Shane McMahon	Posthumous inductee. Founder and longtime promoter of the World (Wide) Wrestling Federation

Group	Inducted by	WWE recognized accolades
The Valiant Brothers	Tony Garea	One-time WWWF World Tag Team Champions; First tag team to be inducted into the WWE Hall of Fame
Jimmy Valiant (James Fanning) – four-time NWA Television Champion; Johnny Valiant (John Sullivan) – became a manager in the WWF and AWA during the 1980s

=== 2004 ===
WWE Hall of Fame (2004)
- Promotion: WWE
- Date: March 13, 2004
- City: New York City, New York
- Venue: New York Hilton Midtown

WWE Hall of Fame chronology
← Previous; 1996	Next → 2005

Category	Inductee	Inducted by
Individual	Big John Studd	Big Show
Individual	Bobby Heenan	Blackjack Lanza
Individual	Don Muraco	Mick Foley
Individual	Greg Valentine	Jimmy Hart
Individual	Harley Race	Ric Flair
Individual	Jesse Ventura	Tyrel Ventura
Individual	Junkyard Dog	Ernie Ladd
Individual	Sgt. Slaughter	Pat Patterson
Individual	"Superstar" Billy Graham	Triple H
Individual	Tito Santana	Shawn Michaels
Celebrity	Pete Rose	Kane

=== 2005 ===
WWE Hall of Fame (2005)
- Promotion: WWE
- Date: April 2, 2005
- City: Los Angeles, California
- Venue: Universal Amphitheatre

WWE Hall of Fame chronology
← Previous; 2004	Next → 2006

- Class headliners appear in **boldface**

Category	Inductee	Inducted by
Individual	Bob Orton Jr.	Randy Orton
Individual	Jimmy Hart	Jerry Lawler
Individual	**Hulk Hogan**	Sylvester Stallone
Individual	The Iron Sheik	Sgt. Slaughter
Individual	Nikolai Volkoff	Jim Ross
Individual	Paul Orndorff	Bobby Heenan
Individual	Roddy Piper	Ric Flair

=== 2006 ===
WWE Hall of Fame (2006)
- Promotion: WWE
- Date: April 1, 2006
- City: Rosemont, Illinois
- Venue: Rosemont Theatre

WWE Hall of Fame chronology
← Previous; 2005	Next → 2007

- Class headliners appear in **boldface**

Category	Inductee	Inducted by
Individual	**Bret Hart**	Stone Cold Steve Austin
Individual	Eddie Guerrero	Chris Benoit, Rey Mysterio and Chavo Guerrero
Individual	Gene Okerlund	Hulk Hogan
Individual	Sherri Martel	Ted DiBiase
Individual	Tony Atlas	Special Delivery Jones
Individual	Verne Gagne	Greg Gagne
Group	The Blackjacks (Blackjack Mulligan and Blackjack Lanza)	Bobby Heenan
Celebrity	William Perry	John Cena

=== 2007 ===
WWE Hall of Fame (2007)
- Promotion: WWE
- Date: March 31, 2007
- City: Detroit, Michigan
- Venue: Fox Theatre

WWE Hall of Fame chronology
← Previous; 2006	Next → 2008

- Class headliners appear in **boldface**

Category	Inductee	Inducted by
Individual	Curt Hennig	Wade Boggs
Individual	**Dusty Rhodes**	Cody Rhodes and Dustin Rhodes
Individual	Jerry Lawler	William Shatner
Individual	Jim Ross	Stone Cold Steve Austin
Individual	Mr. Fuji	Don Muraco
Individual	Nick Bockwinkel	Bobby Heenan
Individual	The Sheik	Rob Van Dam and Sabu
Group	The Wild Samoans (Afa and Sika)	Samu and Matt Anoaʻi

=== 2008 ===
WWE Hall of Fame (2008)
- Promotion: WWE
- Date: March 29, 2008
- City: Orlando, Florida
- Venue: Amway Arena

WWE Hall of Fame chronology
← Previous; 2007	Next → 2009

- Class headliners appear in **boldface**

Category	Inductee	Inducted by
Individual	Eddie Graham	Dusty Rhodes
Individual	Gordon Solie	Jim Ross
Individual	Mae Young	Pat Patterson
Individual	Peter Maivia	The Rock
Individual	Rocky Johnson	The Rock
Individual	**Ric Flair**	Triple H
Group	The Brisco Brothers (Jack Brisco and Gerald Brisco)	John "Bradshaw" Layfield

=== 2009 ===
WWE Hall of Fame (2009)
- Promotion: WWE
- Date: April 4, 2009
- City: Houston, Texas
- Venue: Toyota Center

WWE Hall of Fame chronology
← Previous; 2008	Next → 2010

- Class headliners appear in **boldface**

Category	Inductee	Inducted by
Individual	Bill Watts	Jim Ross
Individual	Howard Finkel	Gene Okerlund
Individual	Koko B. Ware	The Honky Tonk Man
Individual	Ricky Steamboat	Ric Flair
Individual	**Stone Cold Steve Austin**	Vince McMahon
Group	The Funks (Terry and Dory Jr.)	Dusty Rhodes
Group	The Von Erichs (Fritz, Kevin, David, Kerry, Mike and Chris)	Michael Hayes

=== 2010 ===
WWE Hall of Fame (2010)
- Promotion: WWE
- Date: March 27, 2010
- City: Phoenix, Arizona
- Venue: Dodge Theatre

WWE Hall of Fame chronology
← Previous; 2009	Next → 2011

- Class headliners appear in **boldface**

Category	Inductee	Inducted by
Individual	Antonio Inoki	Stan Hansen
Individual	Gorgeous George	Dick "The Destroyer" Beyer
Individual	Maurice Vachon	Pat Patterson
Individual	Stu Hart	Bret Hart
Individual	**Ted DiBiase**	Ted DiBiase Jr. and Brett DiBiase
Individual	Wendi Richter	Roddy Piper
Celebrity	Bob Uecker	Dick Ebersol

=== 2011 ===
WWE Hall of Fame (2011)
- Promotion: WWE
- Date: April 2, 2011
- City: Atlanta, Georgia
- Venue: Philips Arena

WWE Hall of Fame chronology
← Previous; 2010	Next → 2012

- Class headliners appear in **boldface**

Category	Inductee	Inducted by
Individual	Abdullah the Butcher	Terry Funk
Individual	Bob Armstrong	Scott, Brad and Brian Armstrong
Individual	Jim Duggan	Ted DiBiase
Individual	**Shawn Michaels**	Triple H
Individual	Sunny	WWE Divas
Group	The Road Warriors (Hawk, Animal and Paul Ellering)	Dusty Rhodes
Celebrity	Drew Carey	Kane

=== 2012 ===
WWE Hall of Fame (2012)
- Promotion: WWE
- Date: March 31, 2012
- City: Miami, Florida
- Venue: American Airlines Arena

WWE Hall of Fame chronology
← Previous; 2011	Next → 2013

- Class headliners appear in **boldface**

Category	Inductee	Inducted by
Individual	**Edge**	Christian
Individual	Mil Máscaras	Alberto Del Rio
Individual	Ron Simmons	John "Bradshaw" Layfield
Individual	Yokozuna	Jimmy Uso and Jey Uso
Group	The Four Horsemen (Ric Flair, Barry Windham, Arn Anderson, Tully Blanchard and J. J. Dillon)	Dusty Rhodes
Celebrity	Mike Tyson	Shawn Michaels and Triple H

=== 2013 ===
WWE Hall of Fame (2013)
- Promotion: WWE
- Date: April 6, 2013
- City: New York City, New York
- Venue: Madison Square Garden

WWE Hall of Fame chronology
← Previous; 2012	Next → 2014

- Class headliners appear in **boldface**

Category	Inductee	Inducted by
Individual	Bob Backlund	Maria Menounos
Individual	Booker T	Stevie Ray
Individual	**Bruno Sammartino**	Arnold Schwarzenegger
Individual	Mick Foley	Terry Funk
Individual	Trish Stratus	Stephanie McMahon
Celebrity	Donald Trump	Vince McMahon

=== 2014 ===
WWE Hall of Fame (2014)
- Promotion: WWE
- Date: April 5, 2014
- City: New Orleans, Louisiana
- Venue: Smoothie King Center

WWE Hall of Fame chronology
← Previous; 2013	Next → 2015

- Class headliners appear in **boldface**

Category	Inductee	Inducted by
Individual	Carlos Colón Sr.	Carlito, Eddie and Orlando Colón
Individual	Jake Roberts	Diamond Dallas Page
Individual	Lita	Trish Stratus
Individual	Paul Bearer	Kane
Individual	Razor Ramon	Kevin Nash
Individual	**Ultimate Warrior**	Linda McMahon
Celebrity	Mr. T	Gene Okerlund

=== 2015 ===
WWE Hall of Fame (2015)
- Promotion: WWE
- Date: March 28, 2015
- City: San Jose, California
- Venue: SAP Center

WWE Hall of Fame chronology
← Previous; 2014	Next → 2016

- Class headliners appear in **boldface**

Category	Inductee	Inducted by
Individual	Alundra Blayze	Natalya Neidhart
Individual	Kevin Nash	Shawn Michaels
Individual	Larry Zbyszko	Bruno Sammartino
Individual	**Randy Savage**	Hulk Hogan
Individual	Rikishi	The Usos
Individual	Tatsumi Fujinami	Ric Flair
Group	The Bushwhackers (Luke Williams and Butch Miller)	John Laurinaitis
Celebrity	Arnold Schwarzenegger	Triple H
Warrior Award	Connor "The Crusher" Michalek	Dana Warrior and Daniel Bryan

=== 2016 ===
WWE Hall of Fame (2016)
- Promotion: WWE
- Date: April 2, 2016
- City: Dallas, Texas
- Venue: American Airlines Center

WWE Hall of Fame chronology
← Previous; 2015	Next → 2017

- Class headliners appear in **boldface**

Category	Inductee	Inducted by
Individual	Big Boss Man	Slick
Individual	The Godfather	John "Bradshaw" Layfield and Ron Simmons
Individual	Jacqueline	Bubba Ray and D-Von Dudley
Individual	**Sting**	Ric Flair
Individual	Stan Hansen	Vader
Group	The Fabulous Freebirds (Michael Hayes, Terry Gordy, Buddy Roberts and Jimmy Garvin)	Big E, Kofi Kingston and Xavier Woods
Celebrity	Snoop Dogg	John Cena
Warrior Award	Joan Lunden	Dana Warrior
Legacy	Art Thomas	N/A
Legacy	Ed Lewis	N/A
Legacy	Frank Gotch	N/A
Legacy	George Hackenschmidt	N/A
Legacy	Lou Thesz	N/A
Legacy	Mildred Burke	N/A
Legacy	Pat O'Connor	N/A

=== 2017 ===
WWE Hall of Fame (2017)
- Promotion: WWE
- Date: March 31, 2017
- City: Orlando, Florida
- Venue: Amway Center

WWE Hall of Fame chronology
← Previous; 2016	Next → 2018

- Class headliners appear in **boldface**

Category	Inductee	Inducted by
Individual	Beth Phoenix	Natalya
Individual	Diamond Dallas Page	Eric Bischoff
Individual	**Kurt Angle**	John Cena
Individual	Rick Rude	Ricky Steamboat
Individual	Theodore Long	John "Bradshaw" Layfield and Ron Simmons
Group	The Rock 'n' Roll Express (Ricky Morton and Robert Gibson)	Jim Cornette
Warrior Award	Eric LeGrand	Dana Warrior
Legacy	Bearcat Wright	N/A
Legacy	Dr. Jerry Graham	N/A
Legacy	Haystacks Calhoun	N/A
Legacy	Judy Grable	N/A
Legacy	June Byers	N/A
Legacy	Luther Lindsay	N/A
Legacy	Martin Burns	N/A
Legacy	Rikidōzan	N/A
Legacy	Toots Mondt	N/A

=== 2018 ===
WWE Hall of Fame (2018)
- Promotion: WWE
- Date: April 6, 2018
- City: New Orleans, Louisiana
- Venue: Smoothie King Center

WWE Hall of Fame chronology
← Previous; 2017	Next → 2019

- Class headliners appear in **boldface**

Category	Inductee	Inducted by
Individual	**Goldberg**	Paul Heyman
Individual	Hillbilly Jim	Jimmy Hart
Individual	Ivory	Molly Holly
Individual	Jeff Jarrett	Road Dogg
Individual	Mark Henry	Big Show
Group	The Dudley Boyz (Bubba Ray and D-Von Dudley)	Edge and Christian
Warrior Award	Jarrius "JJ" Robertson	Dana Warrior
Celebrity	Kid Rock	Triple H
Legacy	Boris Malenko	N/A
Legacy	Cora Combs	N/A
Legacy	Dara Singh	N/A
Legacy	El Santo	N/A
Legacy	Hiro Matsuda	N/A
Legacy	Jim Londos	N/A
Legacy	Lord Alfred Hayes	N/A
Legacy	Rufus R. Jones	N/A
Legacy	Stan Stasiak	N/A
Legacy	Sputnik Monroe	N/A

=== 2019 ===
WWE Hall of Fame (2019)
- Promotion: WWE
- Date: April 6, 2019
- City: Brooklyn, New York
- Venue: Barclays Center

WWE Hall of Fame chronology
← Previous; 2018	Next → 2021

- Class headliners appear in **boldface**

Category	Inductee	Inducted by
Individual	Brutus Beefcake	Hulk Hogan
Individual	The Honky Tonk Man	Jimmy Hart
Individual	Torrie Wilson	Stacy Keibler
Group	**D-Generation X** **(Triple H, Shawn Michaels, Chyna, Road Dogg, Billy Gunn and X-Pac)**	N/A
Group	Harlem Heat (Booker T and Stevie Ray)	N/A
Group	The Hart Foundation (Bret Hart and Jim Neidhart)	Natalya
Warrior Award	Sue Aitchison	Dana Warrior and John Cena
Legacy	Buddy Rose	N/A
Legacy	Bruiser Brody	N/A
Legacy	Hisashi Shinma	N/A
Legacy	Jim Barnett	N/A
Legacy	Joseph Cohen	N/A
Legacy	Luna Vachon	N/A
Legacy	Primo Carnera	N/A
Legacy	Special Delivery Jones	N/A
Legacy	Toru Tanaka	N/A
Legacy	Wahoo McDaniel	N/A

=== 2020 ===
Due to the COVID-19 pandemic, the 2020 Hall of Fame ceremony did not take place. As such, the Class of 2020 was inducted alongside the Class of 2021 at the 2021 ceremony.

WWE Hall of Fame (2021)
- Promotion: WWE
- Date: April 6, 2021
- City: St. Petersburg, Florida
- Venue: Tropicana Field

WWE Hall of Fame chronology
← Previous; 2019	Next → 2022

- Class headliners appear in **boldface**

Category	Inductee	Inducted by
Individual
Individual	John "Bradshaw" Layfield	N/A
Individual	Jushin Thunder Liger	N/A
Individual	The British Bulldog	N/A
Group	**The New World Order** **(Hulk Hogan, Kevin Nash, Scott Hall and Sean Waltman)**	N/A
Group	The Bella Twins (Nikki Bella and Brie Bella)	N/A
Celebrity	William Shatner	N/A
Warrior Award	Titus O'Neil	N/A
Legacy	Baron Michele Leone	N/A
Legacy	Brickhouse Brown	N/A
Legacy	Gary Hart	N/A
Legacy	Ray Stevens	N/A
Legacy	Steve Williams	N/A

=== 2021 ===
- Class headliners appear in **boldface**

Category	Inductee	Inducted by
Individual	Eric Bischoff	N/A
Individual	**Kane**	N/A
Individual	Molly Holly	N/A
Individual	Rob Van Dam	N/A
Individual	The Great Khali	N/A
Celebrity	Ozzy Osbourne	N/A
Warrior Award	Rich Hering	N/A
Legacy	Buzz Sawyer	N/A
Legacy	Dick the Bruiser	N/A
Legacy	Ethel Johnson	N/A
Legacy	Paul Boesch	N/A
Legacy	Pez Whatley	N/A

=== 2022 ===
WWE Hall of Fame (2022)
- Promotion: WWE
- Date: April 1, 2022
- City: Dallas, Texas
- Venue: American Airlines Center

WWE Hall of Fame chronology
← Previous; 2021	Next → 2023

- Class headliners appear in **boldface**

Category	Inductee	Inducted by
Individual	Queen Sharmell	Booker T
Individual	**The Undertaker**	Vince McMahon
Individual	Vader	Jesse White
Group	The Steiner Brothers (Rick Steiner and Scott Steiner)	Bron Breakker
Warrior Award	Shad Gaspard	Dana Warrior

=== 2023 ===
WWE Hall of Fame (2023)
- Promotion: WWE
- Date: March 31, 2023
- City: Los Angeles, California
- Venue: Crypto.com Arena

WWE Hall of Fame chronology
← Previous; 2022	Next → 2024

- Class headliners appear in **boldface**

Category	Inductee	Inducted by
Individual	**Rey Mysterio**	Konnan
Individual	Stacy Keibler	Mick Foley and Torrie Wilson
Individual	The Great Muta	Ric Flair
Celebrity	Andy Kaufman	Jerry Lawler and Jimmy Hart
Warrior Award	Tim White	John "Bradshaw" Layfield and Ron Simmons

=== 2024 ===
WWE Hall of Fame (2024)
- Promotion: WWE
- Date: April 5, 2024
- City: Philadelphia, Pennsylvania
- Venue: Wells Fargo Center

WWE Hall of Fame chronology
← Previous; 2023	Next → 2025

- Class headliners appear in **boldface**

Category	Inductee	Inducted by
Individual	Bull Nakano	Alundra Blayze
Individual	Lia Maivia	The Rock
Individual	**Paul Heyman**	Roman Reigns
Individual	Thunderbolt Patterson	Big E, Kofi Kingston and Xavier Woods
Group	The U.S. Express (Mike Rotunda and Barry Windham)	Bo Dallas and Mika Rotunda
Celebrity	Muhammad Ali	The Undertaker

=== 2025 ===
WWE Hall of Fame (2025)
- Promotion: WWE
- Date: April 18, 2025
- City: Winchester, Nevada
- Venue: Fontainebleau Las Vegas

WWE Hall of Fame chronology
← Previous; 2024	Next → -

- Class headliners appear in **boldface**

Category	Inductee	Inducted by
Individual	Lex Luger	Diamond Dallas Page
Individual	Michelle McCool	The Undertaker
Individual	**Triple H**	Shawn Michaels
Group	The Natural Disasters (Earthquake and Typhoon)	N/A
Immortal Moment	Bret Hart vs. "Stone Cold" Steve Austin in a No Disqualification Submission match with Ken Shamrock as the special guest referee from WrestleMania 13	CM Punk
Legacy	Dory Funk Sr.	N/A
Legacy	Ivan Koloff	N/A
Legacy	Kamala	N/A

=== 2026 ===
WWE Hall of Fame (2026)
- Promotion: WWE
- Date: April 17, 2026
- City: Paradise, Nevada
- Venue: Dolby Live at the Park MGM

WWE Hall of Fame chronology
← Previous; 2025	Next → -

- Class headliners appear in **boldface**

Category	Inductee	Inducted by
Individual	**AJ Styles**	Luke Gallows and Karl Anderson
Individual	**Stephanie McMahon**	Linda McMahon
Group	Demolition (Ax and Smash)	Arn Anderson, Haku, and The Warlord
Celebrity	Dennis Rodman	Kevin Nash and Sean Waltman
Legacy	Sycho Sid	N/A
Legacy	Bad News Brown	N/A
Immortal Moment	Hulk Hogan vs. André the Giant in a Singles match for the WWF World Heavyweight Championship at WrestleMania 3	Jimmy Hart

== Ceremony dates and locations ==
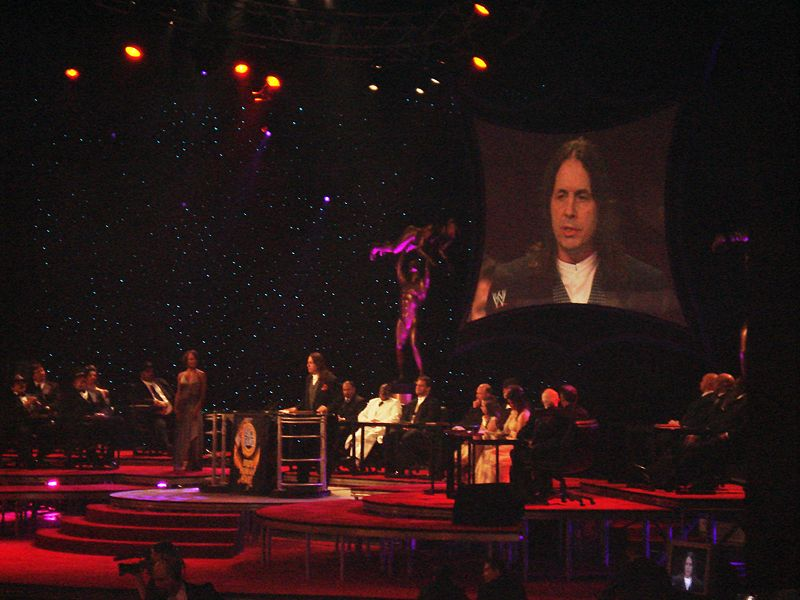
The induction of Bret Hart into the WWE Hall of Fame in 2006

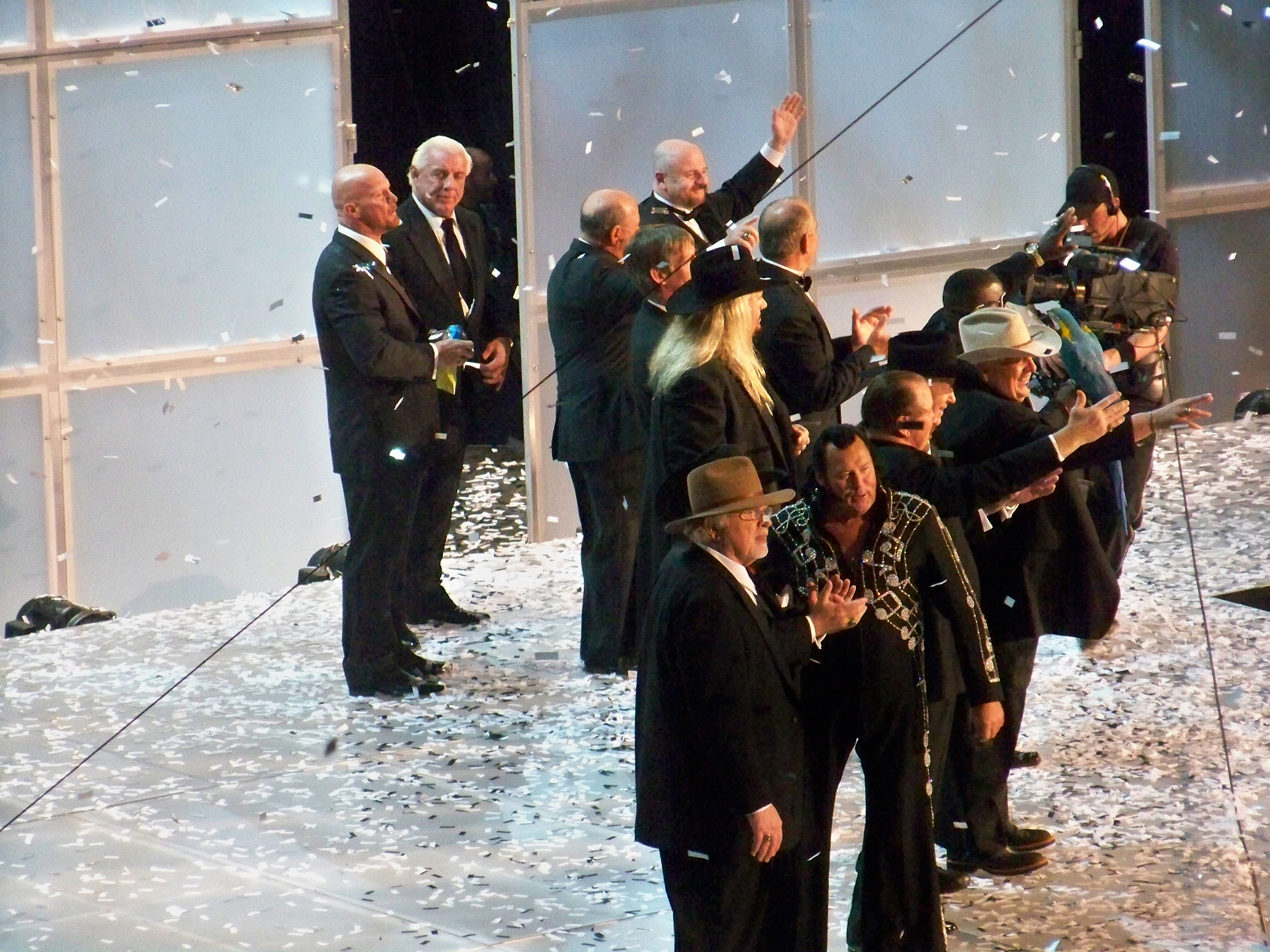
WWE Hall of Fame 2009 ceremony

#	Ceremony	Date	Location	Venue	Host	Associated Event
1	WWE Hall of Fame (1994)	June 9, 1994	Baltimore, Maryland	Omni Inner Harbor International Hotel	—N/a	King of the Ring (1994)
2	WWE Hall of Fame (1995)	June 24, 1995	Philadelphia, Pennsylvania	Marriott Hotel	—N/a	King of the Ring (1995)
3	WWE Hall of Fame (1996)	November 16, 1996	New York City, New York	Marriott Marquis	—N/a	Survivor Series (1996)
4	WWE Hall of Fame (2004)	March 13, 2004	New York City, New York	The Hilton Midtown	Gene Okerlund	WrestleMania XX
5	WWE Hall of Fame (2005)	April 2, 2005	Los Angeles, California	Universal Amphitheatre	Gene Okerlund	WrestleMania 21
6	WWE Hall of Fame (2006)	April 1, 2006	Rosemont, Illinois	Rosemont Theatre	Jerry Lawler	WrestleMania 22
7	WWE Hall of Fame (2007)	March 31, 2007	Detroit, Michigan	Fox Theatre	Todd Grisham	WrestleMania 23
8	WWE Hall of Fame (2008)	March 29, 2008	Orlando, Florida	Amway Arena	Gene Okerlund and Todd Grisham	WrestleMania XXIV
9	WWE Hall of Fame (2009)	April 4, 2009	Houston, Texas	Toyota Center	Jerry Lawler and Todd Grisham	WrestleMania XXV
10	WWE Hall of Fame (2010)	March 27, 2010	Phoenix, Arizona	Dodge Theater	Jerry Lawler	WrestleMania XXVI
11	WWE Hall of Fame (2011)	April 2, 2011	Atlanta, Georgia	Philips Arena	Jerry Lawler	WrestleMania XXVII
12	WWE Hall of Fame (2012)	March 31, 2012	Miami, Florida	American Airlines Arena	Jerry Lawler	WrestleMania XXVIII
13	WWE Hall of Fame (2013)	April 6, 2013	New York City, New York	Madison Square Garden	Jerry Lawler	WrestleMania 29
14	WWE Hall of Fame (2014)	April 5, 2014	New Orleans, Louisiana	Smoothie King Center	Jerry Lawler	WrestleMania XXX
15	WWE Hall of Fame (2015)	March 28, 2015	San Jose, California	SAP Center	Jerry Lawler	WrestleMania 31
16	WWE Hall of Fame (2016)	April 2, 2016	Dallas, Texas	American Airlines Center	Jerry Lawler	WrestleMania 32
17	WWE Hall of Fame (2017)	March 31, 2017	Orlando, Florida	Amway Center	Jerry Lawler	WrestleMania 33
18	WWE Hall of Fame (2018)	April 6, 2018	New Orleans, Louisiana	Smoothie King Center	Jerry Lawler	WrestleMania 34
19	WWE Hall of Fame (2019)	April 6, 2019	Brooklyn, New York	Barclays Center	Corey Graves and Renee Young	WrestleMania 35
20	WWE Hall of Fame (2020)	March 30, 2021 (aired April 6, 2021)	St Petersburg, Florida	WWE ThunderDome at Tropicana Field	Jerry Lawler, Corey Graves, and Kayla Braxton	WrestleMania 37
21	WWE Hall of Fame (2021)	April 1, 2021 (aired April 6, 2021)	St Petersburg, Florida	WWE ThunderDome at Tropicana Field	Jerry Lawler, Corey Graves, and Kayla Braxton	WrestleMania 37
22	WWE Hall of Fame (2022)	April 1, 2022	Dallas, Texas	American Airlines Center	Corey Graves and Kayla Braxton	WrestleMania 38
23	WWE Hall of Fame (2023)	March 31, 2023	Los Angeles, California	Crypto.com Arena	Corey Graves and Kayla Braxton	WrestleMania 39
24	WWE Hall of Fame (2024)	April 5, 2024	Philadelphia, Pennsylvania	Wells Fargo Center	Corey Graves and Jackie Redmond	WrestleMania XL
25	WWE Hall of Fame (2025)	April 18, 2025	Las Vegas, Nevada	Fontainebleau Las Vegas	Michael Cole and Pat McAfee	WrestleMania 41
26	WWE Hall of Fame (2026)	April 17, 2026	Las Vegas, Nevada	Dolby Live at Park MGM	Michael Cole and The Miz	WrestleMania 42

== Reception ==
=== Omissions and refused inductions ===
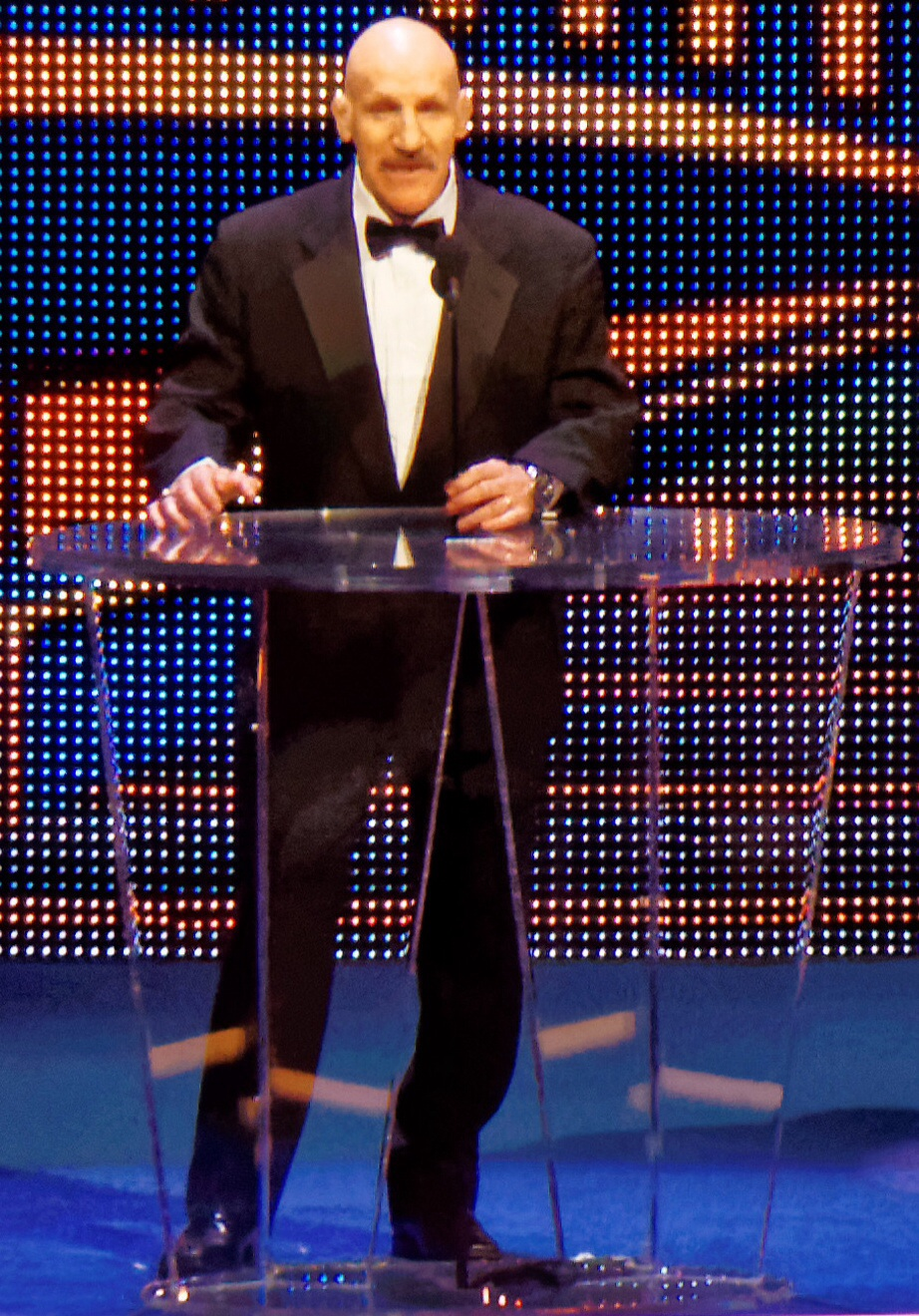
2013 headliner Bruno Sammartino previously refused to accept an induction

In 2012, The Post and Courier columnist Mike Mooneyham noted that the Hall has garnered criticism due to the inductions of questionable performers, and the omissions of major names within the industry. Bob Backlund declined induction multiple times, and Ultimate Warrior wrote that he refused the honor in 2010; they were eventually inducted in 2013 and 2014, respectively. Randy Savage was long recognized as being noticeably absent; Chris Jericho said that the Hall achieved a level of legitimacy by inducting Savage in 2015. Mick Foley long described Vader as "the most glaring and obvious omission from the #WWEHOF"; this was later corrected when he was posthumously inducted as part of the Class of 2022. Chyna is also a topic of conversation of whether or not she should be inducted due to the nature of her post-WWE career. Ultimately, she was posthumously inducted as a member of D-Generation-X in 2019, although fans, family, and fellow wrestlers have since started petitioning for her solo posthumous induction. The most recent discussion amongst fans about a potential induction to the Hall of Fame is about the potential posthumous induction of Bray Wyatt in the near future. Fans started petitioning for his induction, whether it be solo or as part of The Wyatt Family, after his death in August 2023.

Bruno Sammartino, the longest-reigning WWWF World Heavyweight Champion, was once critical of the Hall of Fame. Sammartino disapproved of celebrity inductees such as Pete Rose and William Perry, and said of the ceremony: "What's the point to a Hall of Fame? Is it a building I can actually go to? No. Give me a break". Sammartino declined previous induction offers, before accepting in 2013. Paul Levesque (Triple H) said that it was important for Sammartino to be inducted from a "legitimacy standpoint" and ESPN said that his induction was an opportunity to legitimize the Hall of Fame. After being announced as an inductee, Sammartino said he considered the Hall to be legitimate.

In December 2021, Jeff Hardy was released from WWE. On March 8, 2022, the day that Hardy's no-compete clause expired, WWE reached out to Hardy and offered him an inductee spot to the WWE Hall of Fame ceremony. Hardy declined the offer because he was offended, felt like it was not time yet, and he wanted Matt Hardy to be inducted alongside him as the Hardy Boyz.

==== The Chris Benoit question ====
In June 2007, a double-murder suicide occurred involving Chris Benoit, who murdered his wife and youngest son before committing suicide. Benoit, who held numerous major championships, had a stellar career in the WWF/E, WCW and ECW, and was widely renowned as one of the greatest technical wrestlers of his generation. He was widely thought of during his later career and life as a guaranteed future WWE Hall of Famer. However, once his actions at the end of his life were discovered, that thought quickly dissipated. Despite this, in the years following, a posthumous WWE Hall of Fame induction of Benoit became a regular topic of debate and discussion. While arguments have been made by a number of pro-wrestling fans and industry alumni for Benoit to one day be inducted on account of his in-ring work, the overwhelming opinion from the majority of industry veterans is that the nature of Benoit's demise disqualifies him from ever entering. Benoit is a member of two professional wrestling Hall of Fames outside WWE, namely the Stampede Wrestling Hall of Fame and the Wrestling Observer Newsletter Hall of Fame; both inductions took place in the years prior to his murders (1995 and 2003 respectively).

=== Quality of inductees ===
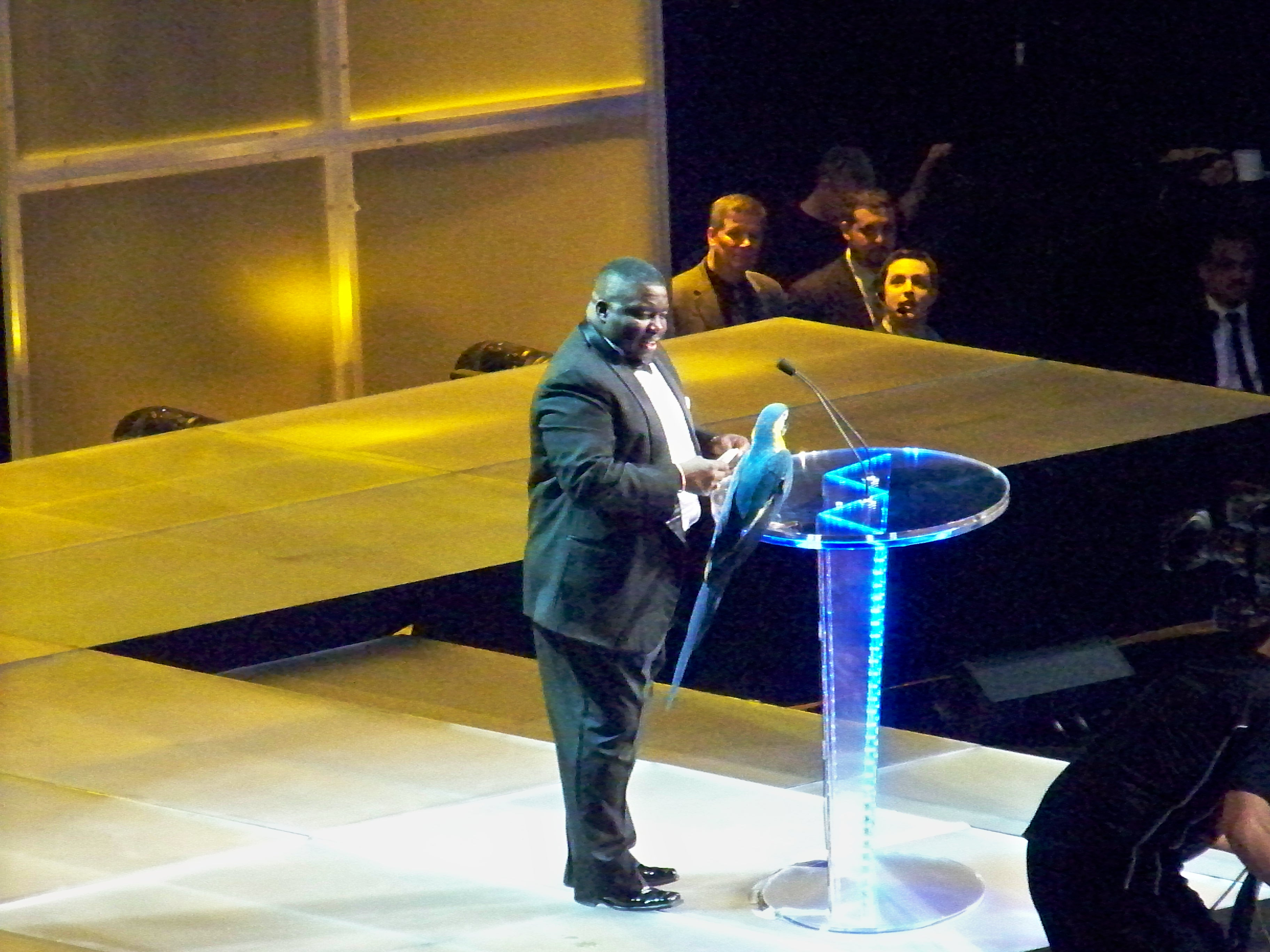
Koko B. Ware's 2009 induction remains controversial

Ric Flair has stated there are several wrestlers in the Hall of Fame that did not deserve it but did not cite any name. Koko B. Ware, who worked as an undercard wrestler in WWF, is often billed as a controversial inductee since he was selected before wrestlers such as Randy Savage or Bruno Sammartino. Caleb Smith of Slam Wrestling questioned how Ware was inducted, but former WWWF World Heavyweight Champion Ivan Koloff never was before his 2017 death. 411Mania writer Steve Cook defended his Hall of Fame status since he was very popular with fans and some of his losses were historic, while Kevin Pantoja described him as "the floor for inductees".

Superstar Billy Graham publicly slammed the hall and demanded that WWE remove him from it, due to the 2011 induction of Abdullah the Butcher. Graham wrote: "It is a shameless organization to induct a bloodthirsty animal such as Abdullah the Butcher into their worthless and embarrassing Hall of Fame and I want the name of Superstar Billy Graham to be no part of it". In 2018, Bret Hart, who headlined the 2006 ceremony, criticized the omissions of several wrestlers, primarily Dynamite Kid and his brother Owen, as well as the inductions of the likes of The Rock 'n' Roll Express and The Fabulous Freebirds, who experienced little success in WWE. Hart said he would not go to another ceremony until WWE inducts "proper, deserving candidates". Hart attended the 2019 ceremony to be inducted for a second time as part of The Hart Foundation. Hart also asked WWE to remove Bill Goldberg from the Hall of Fame, stating that "he got in there for hurting everybody he worked with" (which included himself in 1999). In 2021, after the January 6 United States Capitol attack, Mick Foley asked Vince McMahon to remove Donald Trump, who was then President of the United States, from the Hall of Fame, though it ultimately did not occur.

Dave Scherer of PWInsider has questioned how WWE can sustain the 2004–present Hall of Fame model, due to legends being rapidly inducted. He wrote: "There are only so many people that they can have headline a class. They really need to make more new stars to ensure that they can keep filling arenas for the ceremony". 411Mania's Ryan Byers said WWE standards are "weird" since several inductees have Hall of Fame careers, but others "made it in for political reasons, longstanding loyalty to the promotion".

=== Praise and criticism ===
Owen Hart's widow, Martha Hart, responded to calls for him to be inducted by stating: "Their Hall of Fame? They don't even have a Hallway of Fame. It doesn't exist. There's nothing. It's a fake entity. There's nothing real or tangible. It's just an event they have to make money. They put it on TV and have a celebration, and it's just so ridiculous. I would never even entertain it. It's garbage." Sabu also criticized the Hall of Fame, saying "I'd only do it because I need the money... I don't consider it a real Hall of Fame".

Others have offered praise for the Hall of Fame. World Wrestling Council promoter and 26-time WWC Universal Heavyweight Champion Carlos Colón Sr. said that his 2014 induction was a "realization of a dream". Arn Anderson, who was inducted in 2012 as part of The Four Horsemen, said that the induction was the "pinnacle of [his] wrestling life". 2015 Hall of Fame headliner Kevin Nash stated that two things in the professional wrestling business are real: "When you win your first championship and when you get inducted into the Hall of Fame". Nash claimed this is a sentiment to which colleague Ric Flair also subscribes. During his 2013 induction, Donald Trump said that the honor meant more than "having the highest ratings in TV, being a best-selling author or getting a spot on the Hollywood Walk of Fame".

== See also ==
- WWE Hall of Fame statue
