= WWE Hall of Fame (2011) =

WWE Hall of Fame induction ceremony

- Promotion: WWE
- Date: April 2, 2011
- City: Atlanta, Georgia
- Venue: Philips Arena

WWE Hall of Fame chronology
← Previous; 2010	Next → 2012

WWE Hall of Fame (2011) was the event which featured the introduction of the 12th class to the WWE Hall of Fame. The event was produced by WWE on April 2, 2011, from the Philips Arena in Atlanta, Georgia. The event took place the same weekend as WrestleMania XXVII. The event was hosted by Jerry Lawler. A condensed one-hour version of the ceremony aired on the USA Network the following Monday, before Raw, Originally The Fabulous Freebirds were supposed to be inducted at this event but got moved to the 2016 event. In March 2015 the ceremony was added to the WWE Network.

== Inductees ==
=== Individual ===
- Class headliners appear in **boldface**

Image	Ring name (Birth Name)	Inducted by	WWE recognized accolades
	**"The Heartbreak Kid" Shawn Michaels** (Michael Hickenbottom)	Triple H	• Three-time WWF (Heavyweight) Champion • One-time World Heavyweight Champion • Three-time WWF Intercontinental Champion • One-time WWF European Champion • Two-time Royal Rumble winner (1995, 1996) • First WWE wrestler to achieve the "Grand Slam"
	"Hacksaw" Jim Duggan	Ted DiBiase	• Winner of the first Royal Rumble match in 1988 • One-time WCW United States Heavyweight Champion • One-time and final WCW World Television Champion
	Bob Armstrong (Joseph James)	Scott, Brad, and Brian Armstrong	Held several NWA regional championships
	Sunny (Tamara Sytch)	WWE Divas	_{• Recognized by WWE as the first Diva} _{• Two-time Slammy Award Winner} _{• AOL’s most downloaded woman of 1996.} _{• Former manager}
	Abdullah the Butcher (Lawrence Shreve)	Terry Funk	A hardcore legend known for appearing in a number of wrestling territories, holding a variety of regional championships

=== Group ===
Image	Group	Inducted by	WWE recognized accolades
	The Road Warriors	Dusty Rhodes	Two-time WWF Tag Team Champions; One-time AWA World Tag Team Champions; Four-time NWA National Tag Team Champions; One-time NWA International Tag Team Champions; Three-time NWA World Six-Man Tag team Champions; One-time NWA World Tag Team Champion
Road Warrior Hawk (Michael Hegstrand) – Posthumous inductee: Two-time IWGP Tag Team Champion (without Animal); Road Warrior Animal (Joseph Laurinaitis) – One-time WWE Tag Team Champion (without Hawk) "Precious" Paul Ellering – Long-time manager in the AWA, NWA, and WWF. Inducted alongside the Road Warriors, who he managed for much of his career

=== Celebrity ===
Image	Recipient (Birth name)	Occupation	Inducted by	Appearances
	Drew Carey	Comedian; Game show host	Kane	Was an entrant in the 2001 Royal Rumble
