= WWE Hall of Fame (2008) =

WWE Hall of Fame induction ceremony

- Promotion: WWE
- Date: March 29, 2008
- City: Orlando, Florida
- Venue: Amway Arena

WWE Hall of Fame chronology
← Previous; 2007	Next → 2009

WWE Hall of Fame (2008) was the event which featured the introduction of the 9th class to the WWE Hall of Fame. The event was produced by World Wrestling Entertainment (WWE) on March 29, 2008, from the Amway Arena in Orlando, Florida. The event took place the same weekend as WrestleMania XXIV. The event was hosted by Gene Okerlund and Todd Grisham. The ceremony aired live on the WWE's website, with the final hour airing live on the USA Network. In March 2015 the ceremony was added to the WWE Network.

== Inductees ==
=== Individual ===
- Class headliners appear in **boldface**

Image	Ring name (Birth Name)	Inducted by	WWE recognized accolades
	**"The Nature Boy" Ric Flair** (Richard Fliehr)	Triple H	Two-time WWF Heavyweight Champion; First-ever and six-time WCW World Heavyweight Champion; Eight-time NWA World Heavyweight Champion; Six-time NWA/WCW/WWE United States Heavyweight Champion, Three-time NWA World Tag Team Champion, One-time WWE Intercontinental Champion, Three-time WWF World Tag Team Champion, 1992 Royal Rumble winner Recognized by WWE as a 16-time World Champion
	"High Chief" Peter Maivia (Fanene Maivia)	The Rock	Posthumous inductee: Represented by his daughter Ata Maivia Johnson. Held more than a dozen NWA regional championships
	"Soulman" Rocky Johnson	The Rock	One-time (WWF Tag Team Champion, half of the first black WWF World Tag Team Championship winning duo with Tony Atlas
	Mae Young	Pat Patterson	First ever and one-time NWA United States Women's Champion; One-time NWA Women's World Tag Team Championship
	Eddie Graham (Edward Gossett)	Dusty Rhodes	Posthumous inductee: Represented by his son Mike Graham. Promoter and booker for Championship Wrestling from Florida, held over 30 NWA regional championships including 18 in CWF
	Gordon Solie (Francis Labiak)	Jim Ross	Posthumous inductee: Represented by his daughters Pam and Danise, and his sons Jonard, Eric and Greg. Commentator, announcer and promoter for Championship Wrestling from Florida, later worked for WCW

=== Group ===
Image	Group	Inducted by	WWE recognized accolades
	**The Brisco Brothers**	John "Bradshaw" Layfield	Three-time NWA World Tag Team Champions, held over a dozen regional NWA tag team championships
Jack Brisco (Freddie Brisco) – two-time NWA World Heavyweight Champion. Gerald Brisco (Floyd Brisco) – one-time NWA World Junior Heavyweight Champion, two-time WWF Hardcore Champion; Brisco won the WWE 24/7 Championship in 2020.
