= Ric Flair =

American professional wrestler (born 1949)

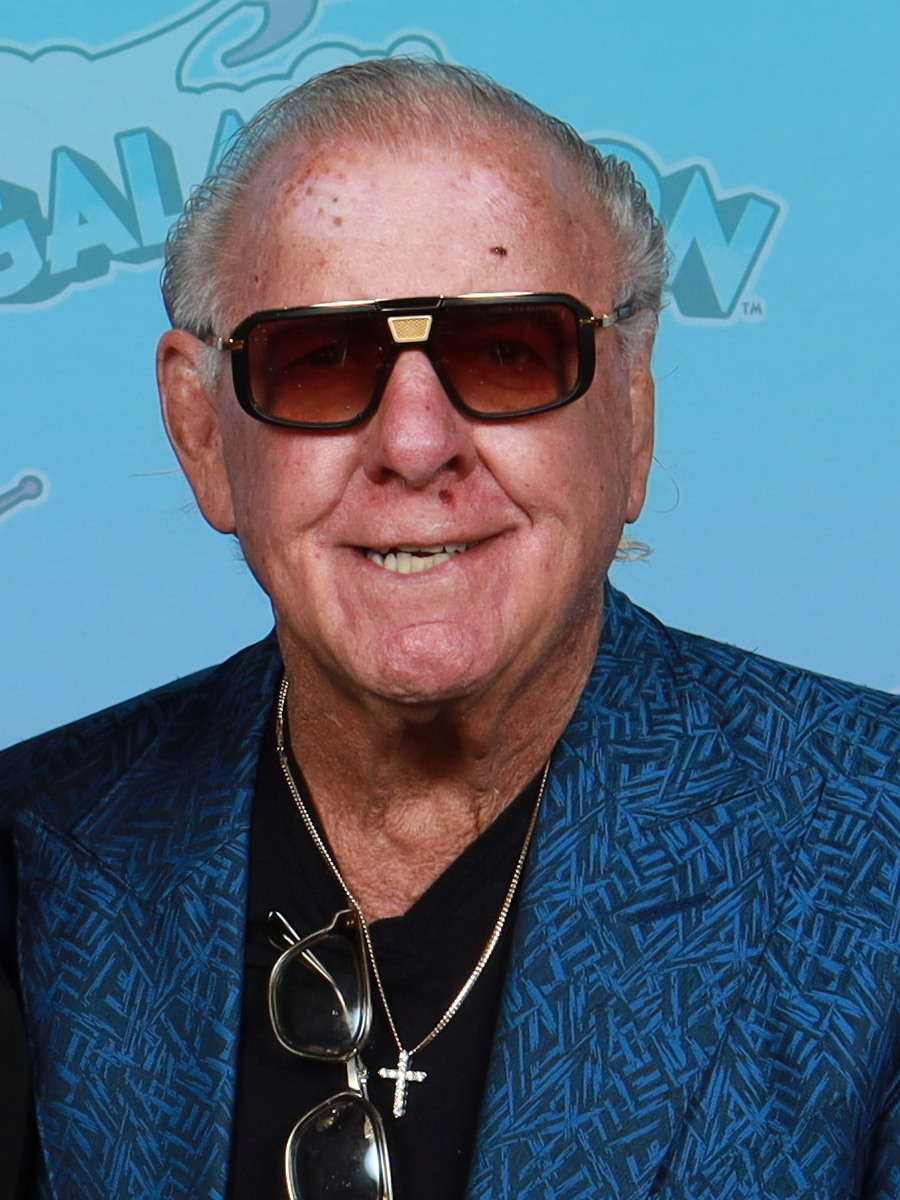
- Flair in 2025
- Born: February 25, 1949 (age 77); Memphis, Tennessee, U.S.
- Other name: Richard Morgan Fliehr
- Occupations: Professional wrestling manager; professional wrestler; author
- Years active: 1972–present
- Spouses: Leslie Goodman (m. 1971; div. 1983); Elizabeth Harrell (m. 1983; div. 2006); Tiffany VanDemark (m. 2006; div. 2009); Jackie Beems (m. 2009; div. 2014)
- Partner: Wendy Barlow (2011–2024; 2026-present)
- Children: 4, including David, Ashley, and Reid
- Relatives: Conrad Thompson (son-in-law)
- Professional wrestling career
- Ring name(s): The Black Scorpion; Nature Boy; Ric Flair
- Billed height: 6 ft 1 in (185 cm)
- Billed weight: 243 lb (110 kg)
- Billed from: Charlotte, North Carolina, U.S.
- Trained by: Verne Gagne
- Debut: December 10, 1972
- Retired: July 31, 2022

Signature
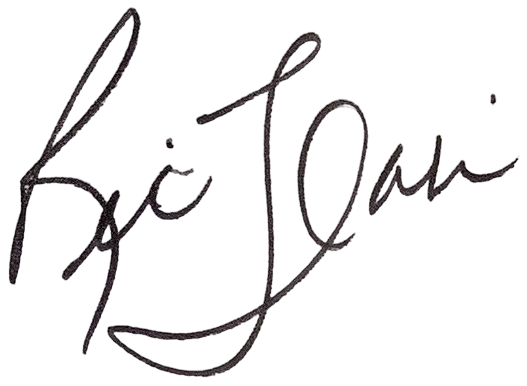

Richard Morgan Fliehr (Note: According to Flair's autobiography To Be the Man, his birth name was listed on different documents as Fred Phillips, Fred Demaree, and Fred Stewart. On March 18, 1949, he was legally adopted by the Fliehr family and was renamed Richard Morgan Fliehr.) (born February 25, 1949), known professionally as Ric Flair, is an American retired professional wrestler. As of November 2023, he is signed to All Elite Wrestling (AEW) in a legends role for special appearances. Regarded by multiple peers and journalists as the greatest professional wrestler of all time, Flair's career spanned fifty years.

Flair is noted for his tenures with Jim Crockett Promotions (JCP) under the National Wrestling Alliance (NWA), World Championship Wrestling (WCW), the World Wrestling Federation (WWF, later WWE), and Total Nonstop Action Wrestling (TNA). Much of his career was spent in JCP and WCW, in which he won numerous titles. Since the mid-1970s, he has used the moniker "the Nature Boy". A major pay-per-view attraction throughout his career, Flair headlined the premier annual NWA/WCW event, Starrcade, on 10 occasions, while also co-headlining its WWF counterpart, WrestleMania, in 1992, after winning that year's Royal Rumble.

Pro Wrestling Illustrated (PWI) awarded him their PWI Wrestler of the Year award a record six times, while Wrestling Observer Newsletter named him the Wrestler of the Year (an award named after him and Lou Thesz) a record eight times. The first two-time WWE Hall of Fame inductee, first inducted with the Class of 2008 for his individual career and again with the Class of 2012 as a member of The Four Horsemen, he is also a member of the NWA Hall of Fame, the Professional Wrestling Hall of Fame, and the Wrestling Observer Newsletter Hall of Fame.

Flair is recognized by WWE as a 16-time world champion (eight-time NWA World Heavyweight Champion, six-time WCW World Heavyweight Champion, and two-time WWF World Heavyweight Champion), although the number of his world championship reigns varies by source, ranging from 16 to 25. The most agreed upon number is 21, which Flair himself has claimed. He was the first holder of the WCW World Heavyweight Championship and the WCW International World Heavyweight Championship, the latter of which he was also the final holder. As the inaugural WCW World Heavyweight Champion, he became the first person to complete the WCW Triple Crown, having already held the WCW United States Heavyweight Championship and WCW World Tag Team Championship. He then completed the WWE Triple Crown when he won the WWE Intercontinental Championship, after already holding the WWF World Heavyweight Championship and the original World Tag Team Championship.

== Early life ==
Fliehr was born on February 25, 1949, in Memphis, Tennessee. His original parents were Luther and Olive Phillips, the latter of whom was also credited with the Demaree and Stewart surnames; nevertheless, his birth name is commonly considered to be Fred Phillips, even if he is also credited on various records as Fred Demaree or Fred Stewart.

Fliehr was adopted by Kathleen Kinsmiller Fliehr (1918–2003) and Richard Reid Fliehr (1918–2000). The Fliehrs decided to adopt due to Kathleen being unable to become pregnant after giving birth to a daughter who died shortly after. At the time of his adoption (arranged by the Tennessee Children's Home Society as part of Georgia Tann's infant trafficking scandal), his adoptive father was completing a residency in obstetrics and gynecology in Detroit, Michigan. His adoptive mother worked for the Star Tribune. Shortly afterward, the family settled in Edina, Minnesota. However, they would move to Golden Valley, Minnesota where the young Fliehr lived throughout his childhood. Though not officially diagnosed with attention deficit hyperactivity disorder (ADHD), Flair stated in his 2004 memoir To Be The Man that he was in fact the "epitome of the disease" while growing up, partying and even having sex and drinking alcohol by the age of 14.

After ninth grade, he attended Wayland Academy in Beaver Dam, Wisconsin for four years, where he participated in wrestling, football, and track. After high school, Fliehr briefly attended the University of Minnesota.

== Professional wrestling career ==
"Sunrise" Also Sprach Zarathustra
Opening fanfare using by Flair

=== American Wrestling Association (1972–1974) ===
A successful amateur wrestler in his teens, Flair trained as a professional wrestler with Verne Gagne. He attended Gagne's first wrestling camp with Greg Gagne, "Jumpin'" Jim Brunzell, Iron Sheik and Ken Patera at Gagne's barn outside Minneapolis in the winter of 1971. On December 10, 1972, he made his debut for Gagne's American Wrestling Association (AWA) promotion in Rice Lake, Wisconsin, wrestling George "Scrap Iron" Gadaski to a 10-minute draw while adopting the ring name Ric Flair. During his time in the AWA, Flair had matches with Dusty Rhodes, Chris Taylor, André the Giant, Larry Hennig and Wahoo McDaniel. Flair left the AWA in May 1974.

=== International Wrestling Enterprise (1973) ===
Flair made his first appearances in Japan in 1973 with International Wrestling Enterprise (IWE) as part of a working agreement between the IWE and AWA promoter Verne Gagne. He competed in IWE's "Big Summer Series" throughout June and July, facing opponents such as Animal Hamaguchi, Great Kusatsu, Katsuzo Matsumoto, Mighty Inoue, and Rusher Kimura.

=== Jim Crockett Promotions / World Championship Wrestling (1974–1991) ===
==== Television Champion; plane crash (1974–1977) ====
In May 1974, Flair left the AWA for Jim Crockett Promotions' National Wrestling Alliance (NWA) territory in the Mid-Atlantic region. He debuted on May 13, 1974, defeating Abe Jacobs. Shortly after his debut, Flair won his first championship in the promotion, by teaming with Rip Hawk to defeat Bob Bruggers and Paul Jones in the Greensboro Coliseum to win the NWA Mid-Atlantic Tag Team Championship. After a lengthy title reign, Flair and Hawk lost the titles to Paul Jones and Tiger Conway Jr. on December 6, 1974. Brute Bernard substituted for an inactive Hawk during the title defense.

Flair captured his first singles title on February 9, 1975, by beating Paul Jones for the NWA Mid-Atlantic Television Championship in the Winston-Salem War Memorial Coliseum. After holding the title for six months, he lost it back to Jones on August 8. During the same time, Flair began feuding with Wahoo McDaniel over the NWA Mid-Atlantic Heavyweight Championship. After coming up short in several title opportunities, he finally defeated McDaniel for the title in a title vs. hair match on September 20, 1975 in the Hampton Roads Coliseum.

On October 4, 1975, Flair was badly injured in a plane crash in Wilmington, North Carolina that killed the pilot and paralyzed Johnny Valentine (also on board were Mr. Wrestling, Bob Bruggers, and promoter David Crockett). Flair broke his back in three places and was told by doctors that he would never wrestle again. He conducted a rigorous physical therapy schedule, however, and returned to the ring just three months later. Flair altered his wrestling technique from the power/brawling style he had used early on to one more focused on grappling, which led him to adopt the "Nature Boy" gimmick he would use throughout his career.

Upon returning in January 1976, Flair resumed his feud with Wahoo McDaniel over the Mid-Atlantic Heavyweight Championship. He lost the title back to McDaniel on May 3, 1976, but regained it three weeks later by defeating McDaniel in a rematch on May 24. The title exchange with McDaniel continued as Flair lost the title to McDaniel in a steel cage match on September 11. On October 16, Flair defeated McDaniel in a title vs. hair match to regain the Mid-Atlantic Heavyweight Championship. During this time, Flair teamed with Greg Valentine to defeat the Andersons (Gene Anderson and Ole Anderson) in a no disqualification match to win the Mid-Atlantic Tag Team Championship on December 26. The following day, Flair lost the Mid-Atlantic Heavyweight Championship to McDaniel in a no disqualification match.

In the midst of his tag team championship reign, Flair defeated Rufus R. Jones to win his second Mid-Atlantic Television Championship on April 4, 1977. On May 8, Flair and Valentine lost the World Tag Team Championship back to the Andersons in a steel cage match.

On May 15, 1977, Flair received his first opportunity for the NWA World Heavyweight Championship against Harley Race. Race retained the title after the match ended in a double count-out. Flair then lost the Mid-Atlantic Television Championship to Ricky Steamboat on June 15, beginning a lengthy and historic rivalry between the two.

==== United States Heavyweight Champion (1977–1981) ====
On June 30, 1977, Flair and Greg Valentine defeated Dino Bravo and Tiger Conway Jr. to win the Mid-Atlantic Tag Team Championship. On July 29, 1977, Flair defeated Bobo Brazil in the Richmond Coliseum to win his first NWA United States Heavyweight Championship (Mid Atlantic version) in Richmond, Virginia. Flair and Valentine lost the Mid-Atlantic Tag Team Championship to Paul Jones and Ricky Steamboat on August 22. Flair defended the United States Heavyweight Championship against numerous challengers, including Steamboat, whom he wrestled in several matches, such as a title versus title match for Flair's title and Steamboat's Mid-Atlantic Television Championship. On October 30, Flair and Valentine defeated the Andersons to win the NWA World Tag Team Championship (Mid Atlantic version). On October 20, Flair lost the United States Heavyweight Championship to Ricky Steamboat.

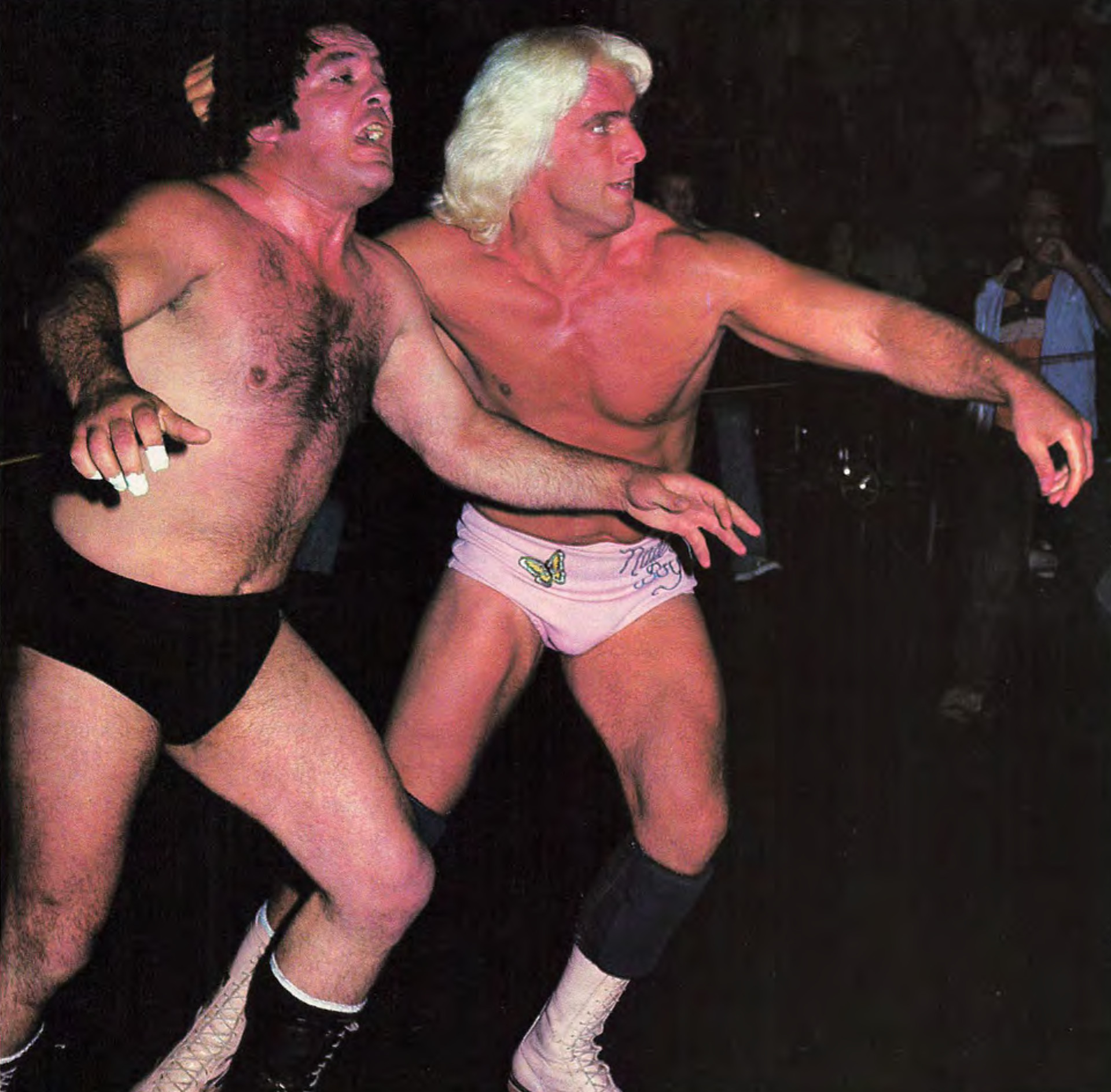
Flair (right) wrestling Paul Jones, c. 1979

On March 30, 1978, Flair and Valentine were stripped of the World Tag Team Championship by NWA management due to continuously ending their matches via disqualification. On April 9, Flair defeated Mr. Wrestling in a title versus hair match to capture his second United States Heavyweight Championship. On October 30, Flair and John Studd defeated Paul Jones and Ricky Steamboat to win the Mid-Atlantic Tag Team Championship, but lost the titles back to Jones and Steamboat, five days later on November 5. After retaining the title against several challengers including Blackjack Mulligan and Jimmy Snuka, Flair lost the United States Heavyweight Championship to Steamboat on December 17. Flair then came up short against Steamboat in several title challenges, before defeating him in a steel cage match to win his third United States Heavyweight Championship on April 1, 1979. During this time, Flair began feuding with the original "Nature Boy", Buddy Rogers, due to Flair referring to himself as "The Nature Boy". The rivalry concluded in a match between the two at Battle of the Nature Boys on July 8, in which Flair defended the United States Heavyweight Championship against Rogers. Rogers put Flair over in the match, leading to Flair retaining the title and cementing his place as the new "Nature Boy" of professional wrestling.

On August 12, 1979, Flair teamed with Blackjack Mulligan to defeat Baron von Raschke and Paul Jones to win the NWA World Tag Team Championship. Flair and Mulligan lost the titles back to Raschke and Jones on August 22. Flair then began feuding with Jimmy Snuka over the United States Heavyweight Championship, defeating him to win the title for a fourth time on April 20, 1980. Flair lost the title to his former tag team partner Greg Valentine on July 26. Flair defeated Valentine in a lumberjack match to win his fifth United States Heavyweight Championship on November 24. On January 27, 1981, Flair lost the title to Roddy Piper in a title versus title match, where Flair's United States Heavyweight Championship and Piper's Television Championship were on the line. Flair faced Piper in various rematches for the title throughout the year but failed to regain the title.

==== World Heavyweight Champion (1981–1985) ====
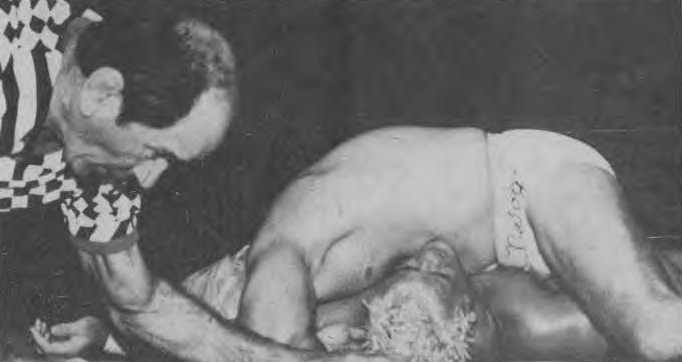
Flair pins Dusty Rhodes in Memorial Hall, Kansas City, Kansas to win the NWA World Heavyweight Championship as Lou Thesz (left) counts the pinfall, on September 17, 1981.

On September 17, 1981 in Memorial Hall in Kansas City, Kansas, Flair defeated Dusty Rhodes for his first NWA World Heavyweight Championship in a bout with Lou Thesz as special guest referee. In the following years, Flair established himself as the promotion's main franchise in the midst of emerging competition from Vince McMahon's World Wrestling Federation (WWF). As the NWA World Heavyweight Champions, he defended the title in bouts promoted by Jim Crockett Promotions, but also toured the world defending the title in bouts promoted by other NWA affiliates including All Japan Pro Wrestling, Championship Wrestling from Florida, Georgia Championship Wrestling, Pacific Northwest Wrestling, and the St. Louis Wrestling Club. His challengers included Tommy Rich, Ole Anderson, Roddy Piper, Jack Brisco, Mr. Wrestling II, Wahoo McDaniel, and Sgt. Slaughter.

During his inaugural reign as NWA World Heavyweight Champion, Flair twice lost the title in bouts not officially recognized by the NWA. On September 7, 1982, Flair lost the title to Jack Veneno in a bout in the Palacio de los Deportes Virgilio Travieso Soto in Santo Domingo in the Dominican Republic in front of an audience of circa 30,000 people; Flair reportedly instructed Veneno to defeat him due to fears of the audience in the oversold arena turning violent if the popular Veneno lost. The title was quietly returned to Flair; in the Dominican Republic, Veneno was reported as having surrendered the title back to Flair due to not being willing to leave the country to defend it. On January 6, 1983, Flair lost the title to Carlos Colón in Puerto Rico. Later that month, the title was returned to Flair, who was reported to have defeated Colón at a house show in Miami, Florida.

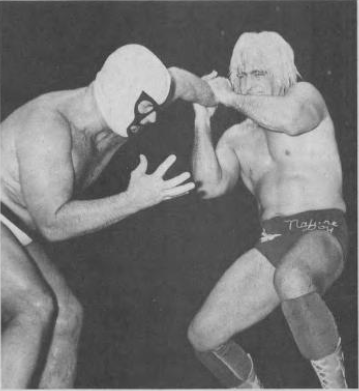
Flair (right) facing Mr. Wrestling II, c. 1982

Flair's first reign as NWA World Heavyweight Champion officially ended in June 1983, when Harley Race defeated Flair in a two out of three falls match in the Kiel Auditorium for the NWA World Heavyweight Championship. At Starrcade '83: A Flare for the Gold in November 1983, Flair defeated Race in a steel cage match to regain the NWA World Heavyweight Championship. Flair lost the title to Race and won it back in the span of three days in New Zealand and Singapore in March 1984. At the David Von Erich Memorial Parade of Champions at Texas Stadium on May 6, 1984, Flair lost the NWA World Heavyweight Championship to Kerry Von Erich.

On May 24, 1984, Flair regained the NWA World Heavyweight Championship from Kerry Von Erich in Yokosuka, Japan, beginning a reign that would last for two years, two months and two days. At Starrcade '84: The Million Dollar Challenge in November 1984, Flair defended the title against Dusty Rhodes in a bout with boxer Joe Frazier as special guest referee, with the winner of the bout to receive a $1,000,000 purse as well as the title. The match ended when Frazier stopped the match due to a cut on Rhodes's forehead. At the inaugural Great American Bash in July 1985, Flair successfully defended the title against Ivan Koloff.

==== The Four Horsemen (1985–1991) ====
In 1985, the tag team of Arn Anderson and Ole Anderson began aiding Flair (whom they claimed as a "cousin") in attacks against Dusty Rhodes, Magnum T.A. and Sam Houston, including in September where Flair and the Andersons broke Rhodes' leg. Several weeks later, the Andersons interrupted Houston's match against Tully Blanchard and the three villains roughed up Houston. Flair, Blanchard and the Andersons formalized their alliance, calling themselves The Four Horsemen, with Blanchard's manager J. J. Dillon coming on board. The Four Horsemen were unlike previous villainous alliances, as the four immediately used their strength in numbers to decimate NWA's fan favorites (including a baseball bat beatdown of Rhodes in a parking lot) while controlling most of the championship titles. At Starrcade '85: The Gathering in November, Flair again defended the NWA World Heavyweight Championship against Rhodes. Rhodes pinned him to win the title, but the result was changed to a disqualification win for Rhodes, and the title returned to Flair in an example of a "Dusty finish".

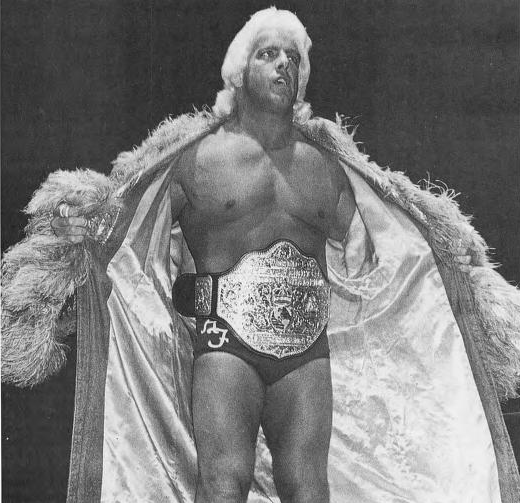
Flair with the "Big Gold" NWA World Heavyweight Championship, c. 1986

By 1986, wrestling promoter Jim Crockett Jr. had consolidated NWA member promotions he owned into one entity, under the banner of the National Wrestling Alliance. Controlling much of the traditional NWA territories in the southeast and Midwestern US, Crockett looked to expand and built his promotion around Flair as champion. Flair's bookings were tightly controlled by Crockett, and a custom championship belt, the "Big Gold Belt", was created for Flair.

Flair lost the NWA World Heavyweight Championship to Rhodes on July 26, 1986, at The Great American Bash in a steel cage match. However, Flair regained the title at a house show on August 9, when Rhodes passed out in the figure four leglock. At Starrcade '86: The Skywalkers in November, Flair successfully defended the Heavyweight Championship against Nikita Koloff.

Flair lost the NWA World Heavyweight Championship in Detroit to Ron Garvin on September 25, 1987. Garvin held the title for two months before losing to Flair on November 26, at WCW's first pay-per-view event, Starrcade '87: Chi-Town Heat, in Chicago.

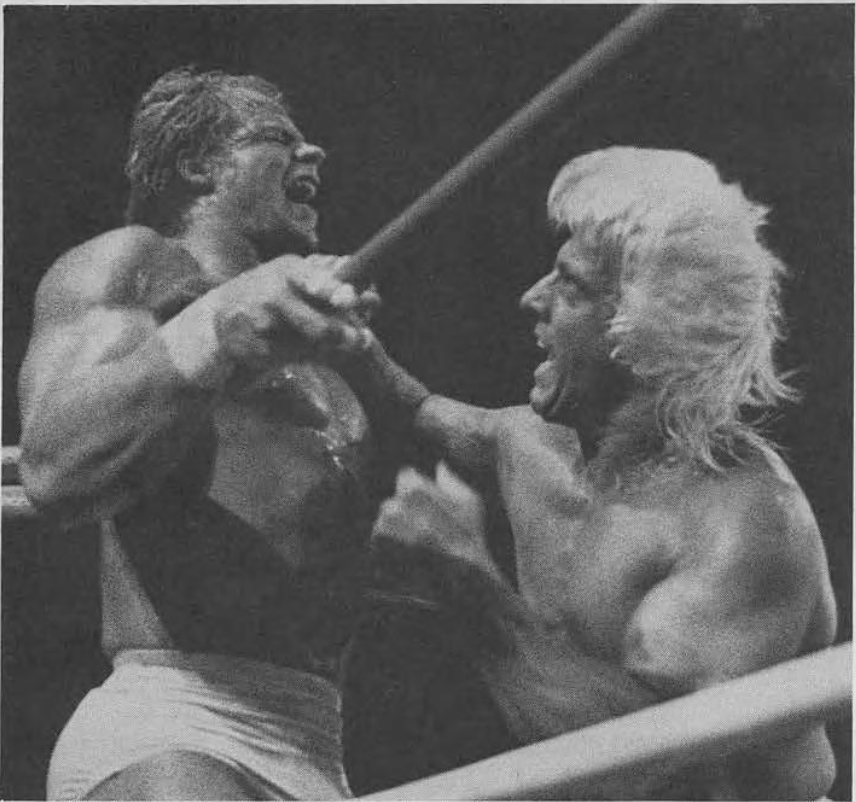
Flair facing Lex Luger at The Great American Bash in July 1988

In early 1988, Sting and Flair fought to a 45-minute time-limit draw at Clash of the Champions I. At The Great American Bash in July, Flair defended the NWA World Heavyweight Championship against former Four Horsemen member Lex Luger by referee stoppage. Flair retained the title when the referee stopped the match due to Luger's excessive bleeding. At Starrcade '88: True Gritt in December, Flair defeated Luger by pinfall, to retain the title and end their feud.

On February 20, 1989, at Chi-Town Rumble in Chicago, Ricky Steamboat pinned Flair to win the NWA World Heavyweight Championship. This prompted a series of rematches, where Steamboat was presented as a "family man" (often accompanied by his wife and son), while Flair opposed him as an immoral, fast-living "ladies man". Following a best-of-three falls match with Steamboat that lasted just short of the 60-minute time limit at Clash of the Champions VI: Ragin' Cajun on April 2, Flair regained the title from Steamboat on May 7, at WrestleWar '89: Music City Showdown in a match that was voted 1989's "PWI Match of the Year".

Following his final match against Steamboat, Flair was attacked by Terry Funk after he refused to give Funk a title match, starting a feud between the two. On July 23, 1989, Flair defeated Funk at The Great American Bash, but they continued to feud through the summer and Flair reformed The Four Horsemen, with the surprise addition of long-time rival Sting, to combat Funk's J-Tex Corporation. At Halloween Havoc in October 1989, Flair and Sting defeated Funk and The Great Muta in a Thunderdome match. The feud culminated in an "I Quit" match at Clash of the Champions IX: New York Knockout which Flair won.

At Starrcade '89: Future Shock in December 1989, Sting and Flair entered the Iron Man tournament, with Sting defeating Flair in the finals to earn a title shot. At Clash of the Champions X: Texas Shootout, Flair kicked Sting out of The Four Horsemen after he refused to waive his shot at the NWA World Heavyweight Championship, resulting in a revived feud between them. Sting was scheduled to face Flair for the title at WrestleWar '90: Wild Thing in February 1990, but after Sting suffered a knee injury he was replaced with Luger, who Flair defeated by count-out. At Capital Combat in May 1990, Luger challenged Flair again, but failed to win the title after Flair was disqualified due to interference from Four Horsemen member Barry Windham. On July 7, 1990, at The Great American Bash, Flair finally lost the NWA World Heavyweight Championship to Sting. Following his loss, he entered the tag division; at Halloween Havoc in October 1990, Flair and Arn Anderson unsuccessfully challenged Doom for the NWA World Tag Team Championship. After being unmasked as Sting's nemesis the Black Scorpion at Starrcade '90: Collision Course in 1990, Flair regained the title from Sting at a house show on January 11, 1991. Subsequent to this title win, Flair was recognized by WCW as the first WCW World Heavyweight Champion,he was still also recognized as NWA World Heavyweight Champion. At WrestleWar '91 in January 1991, Flair and The Four Horsemen defeated Sting, Brian Pillman and the Steiner Brothers in a WarGames match.

On March 21, 1991, Tatsumi Fujinami defeated Flair in a match in Tokyo at WCW/New Japan Supershow I. While the NWA recognized Fujinami as their new champion, WCW did not because Fujinami had backdropped Flair over the top rope in a violation of WCW rules. On May 19, 1991, Flair defeated Fujinami at SuperBrawl I in St. Petersburg, Florida to reclaim the NWA World Heavyweight Championship and retain the WCW World Heavyweight Championship. After his match with Fujinami, Flair began a feud with El Gigante. On June 23, 1991, Flair and One Man Gang lost to Gigante and Luger in a stretcher match that took place at a house show in the Omni Coliseum; this marked his final match for World Championship Wrestling in close to two years.

In the spring of 1991, Flair had a contract dispute with WCW president Jim Herd, who wanted him to take a pay cut. Flair had resigned as head booker in February 1990 and Herd wanted to reduce Flair's role in the promotion further, even though Flair was still a top draw. According to Flair, Herd proposed changes in his appearance and ring name (i.e. by shaving his hair, wearing a diamond earring and going by the name Spartacus) in order to "change with the times". Flair disagreed with the proposals and two weeks before The Great American Bash, Herd fired him and vacated the WCW World Heavyweight Championship. While Flair had left for the WWF, he was still recognized as the NWA World Heavyweight Champion until September 8, when the title was officially vacated.

=== All Japan Pro Wrestling (1978–1987) ===
While working for Jim Crockett Jr.'s Mid-Atlantic Championship Wrestling (MACW), Flair began working tours for All Japan Pro Wrestling (AJPW). On April 27, 1978, Flair challenged for the NWA United National Championship in a losing effort. Throughout the 1980s, Flair defended the NWA World Heavyweight Championship in All Japan against the likes of Genichiro Tenryu, Riki Choshu, Jumbo Tsuruta, Harley Race, and Kerry Von Erich. On October 21, 1985, Flair wrestled Rick Martel in a double title match where he defended the NWA World Heavyweight Championship and challenged for the AWA World Heavyweight Championship, but the match ended in a double countout. As All Japan withdrew from the National Wrestling Alliance (NWA) in the late 1980s, World Championship Wrestling (WCW) began a working agreement with New Japan Pro-Wrestling (NJPW).

=== New Japan Pro-Wrestling (1989–1991, 1995–1996) ===
In 1989, the working agreement led to a feud between Flair and Keiji Mutoh, who was wrestling under The Great Muta gimmick, in the United States for WCW. On March 21, 1991, Flair defended the NWA World Heavyweight Championship and challenged Tatsumi Fujinami for the IWGP Heavyweight Championship in a double title match on the WCW/New Japan Supershow at the Tokyo Dome. Fujinami beat Flair for the NWA World Heavyweight Championship, but later lost the title at WCW's SuperBrawl I on May 19, 1991, in the United States.

In August 1995, while under WCW contract, Flair participated in the G1 Climax tournament in New Japan Pro-Wrestling (NJPW), where he beat Shiro Koshinaka, drew Masahiro Chono, and lost to Keiji Mutoh. On July 17, 1996, Flair challenged Shinya Hashimoto for the IWGP Heavyweight Championship in a losing effort in NJPW.

=== World Wrestling Federation (1991–1993) ===
Flair signed with the World Wrestling Federation (WWF) in August 1991. His arrival was hyped by Bobby Heenan, beginning with the August 11 episode of WWF Wrestling Challenge. On the September 21 episode of WWF Superstars, Flair debuted in WWF with the Big Gold Belt, calling himself the "Real World's Champion". WCW sued Flair in an attempt to reclaim the championship belt, but Flair claimed otherwise due to a loophole in NWA policy; at the time he first became champion, the NWA required all of the wrestlers that it selected to be world champion to put down a security deposit of $25,000 (equivalent to $59,000 in 2025), which, in effect, resulted in the belt being leased to any wrestler who held it. The NWA, in usual cases, would return the deposit and any interest that may have accumulated upon the conclusion of the wrestler's championship reign. They did not do this for Flair before he was terminated by WCW, and since the money was still owed to him by the NWA upon his signing with the WWF, Flair believed that the title belt had become his personal property to do with as he pleased.

Led by his "financial adviser" Bobby Heenan and his "executive consultant" Mr. Perfect, Flair repeatedly issued challenges to WWF wrestlers like "Rowdy" Roddy Piper and Hulk Hogan. His first match with the promotion saw him wrestle Mark Thomas to a no contest on the September 28 episode of Superstars by provoking Piper to attack him, and Flair then attacked Piper with the Big Gold Belt and a chair. His first televised win in WWF occurred on the September 29 episode of Wrestling Challenge by squashing Jim Powers. Flair wrestled a team led by Piper at Survivor Series in November and helped The Undertaker defeat Hogan for the WWF Championship that same night.

At the 1992 Royal Rumble, held in the Knickerbocker Arena in Albany, New York, Flair won the Royal Rumble match to claim the vacant WWF Championship. Flair entered as number three in the Rumble match and lasted 60 minutes, last eliminating Sid Justice with help from Hulk Hogan, who had been eliminated by Justice seconds earlier. At Saturday Night's Main Event XXX on January 27, 1992, Flair and Undertaker defeated Hogan and Justice by disqualification. In February 1992, Flair faced the WWF Intercontinental Champion Roddy Piper in a series of inconclusive title-versus-title matches. In March 1992, he teamed with Justice to face Hogan and Piper in a series of tag team matches. Randy Savage then challenged Flair for the WWF Championship as part of the double main event at WrestleMania VIII. In the storyline, Flair taunted Savage by claiming that he had a prior relationship with Savage's wife, Miss Elizabeth. Savage defeated Flair for the title at WrestleMania.

Following his loss to Savage, Flair faced him in a lengthy series of rematches throughout mid-1992. In April, Flair took part in the WWF's "Rampage Again" tour of Europe. In July 1992, as Savage prepared to defend the WWE Championship against Ultimate Warrior at SummerSlam, Flair and Mr. Perfect sowed mistrust between the two by suggesting that they would back one or the other during their match. They actually attacked both Savage and Warrior, resulting in the latter winning by count-out, and injured Savage's knee, an injury that Flair exploited to regain the title in a match with Savage three days later on September 1 in Hershey, Pennsylvania, which aired on the September 14 episode of WWF Prime Time Wrestling. Flair's second reign saw him defend the title against challengers such as Ultimate Warrior, The Undertaker, and El Matador. On September 15, 1992, Flair defended the WWF Championship against Genichiro Tenryu at a Wrestle Association R event in Yokohama, Japan; the match ended in a draw. In October, Flair took part in the WWF's "Rampage" tour of Europe. Flair's second reign ended when he lost the title to Bret Hart on October 12 at a house show in Saskatoon, Saskatchewan.

Flair teamed with Razor Ramon to take on Savage and Perfect at Survivor Series in November 1992. Throughout December 1992 and January 1993, he faced Bret Hart in a series of rematches, including an iron man match in the Boston Garden, but was unable to regain the WWF Championship. Flair appeared in the Royal Rumble in January 1993, this time entering first; he lasted over 18 minutes before being eliminated by Mr. Perfect.

Flair had a verbal agreement with Vince McMahon with the condition that if he was not going to be used in a main event position and had an offer to go elsewhere, he would be released from his contract. He opted to leave WWF when he was going to be moved to a mid-card position and Bill Watts invited him to come back to WCW. On January 18, 1993, Flair lost a loser leaves the WWF match to Mr. Perfect (the match was broadcast on the January 25, 1993 episode of Monday Night Raw, the night after the Royal Rumble). Flair then fulfilled his remaining house show commitments and took part in the WWF's "Winter Tour '93" of Europe. On February 11, 1993, he made his last appearance with the WWF until 2001, before returning to WCW.

=== Super World of Sports (1992) ===
In April 1992, Flair toured Japan with the Super World of Sports (SWS) promotion as part of an agreement between the WWF and SWS. In his first bout, he teamed with The Natural Disasters to defeat Ashura Hara, Genichiro Tenryu, and Takashi Ishikawa in a six-man tag team match. He went on to defeat Tenryu in a singles match, then lost to Tenryu in a two-out-of-three falls match.

=== World Championship Wrestling (1993–2001) ===
==== WCW World Heavyweight Champion (1993–1996) ====
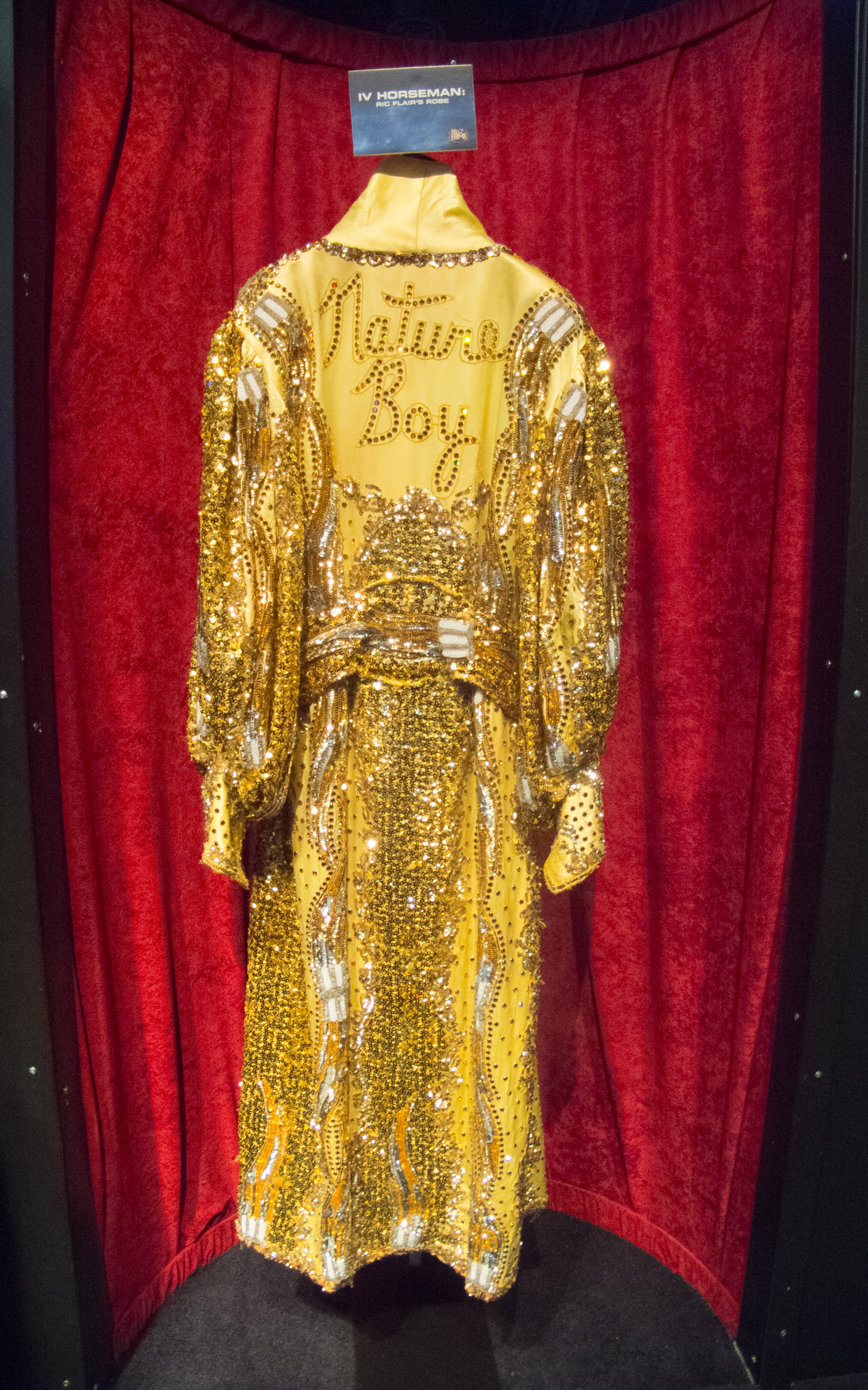
One of Flair's signature robes

Flair triumphantly returned to WCW as a hero in February 1993. As a result of a "no-compete" clause he was initially unable to wrestle, so hosted a talk show in WCW called A Flair for the Gold. Arn Anderson appeared at the bar on the set, and Flair's maid Fifi cleaned or bore gifts. At Slamboree '93: A Legends' Reunion in May 1993, Flair reformed The Four Horsemen with Arn Anderson, Ole Anderson, and Paul Roma.

Flair returned to the ring for WCW on June 9, teaming with Arn Anderson and Paul Roma to defeat Barry Windham and the Hollywood Blonds in a bout recorded for WCW Saturday Night. At Clash of the Champions XXIII later that month, Flair and Anderson challenged the Hollywood Blondes for the NWA World Tag Team Championship and WCW World Tag Team Championship, winning by disqualification after Windham interfered. In July 1993 at Beach Blast in the Mississippi Coast Coliseum in Biloxi, Mississippi, Flair defeated Windham for the NWA World Heavyweight Championship. At Fall Brawl '93: War Games in September 1993, Flair lost the title, now rebranded the WCW International World Heavyweight Championship, to "Ravishing" Rick Rude.

At Starrcade '93: 10th Anniversary in December 1993, Flair defeated Vader in the Independence Arena in Charlotte, North Carolina to win the WCW World Heavyweight Championship for the second time. In spring 1994, Flair began a tweener turn and started another feud with Ricky Steamboat and challenged Steamboat to a match at Spring Stampede which ended in a no contest from a double pin, causing the title to be held up. Flair defeated Steamboat in a rematch to reclaim the held-up title on an episode of WCW Saturday Night. Flair challenged Col. Robert Parker to wrestle one of his men at Slamboree '94: A Legends' Reunion, which turned out to be Windham, whom Flair defeated, afterwards he quietly turned heel and took Sherri Martel as his manager. He wrestled Lord Steven Regal in a five-match series under Marquess of Queensberry Rules, which aired on WCW Worldwide between April 30-May 28, which Flair won, with 2 wins, 1 loss, and 2 draws.

In June 1994 at Clash of the Champions XXVII, Flair defeated Sting in a unification match, merging the WCW International World Heavyweight Championship with the WCW World Heavyweight Championship. He also solidified his heel turn after his alliance with Sherri was brought into the open, after she helped him win the match while pretending she had sided with Sting. After becoming the unified WCW champion, Flair feuded with Hulk Hogan upon Hogan's arrival in WCW in June 1994, losing the WCW World Heavyweight Championship to him in July at Bash at the Beach. Flair continued to feud with Hogan and lost to Hogan in a steel cage retirement match at Halloween Havoc. Flair took a few months off, before returning to WCW television in January 1995 for an interview at Clash of the Champions XXX. After attacking Hogan at Superbrawl V, Flair began appearing as a part-time manager for Vader, who was in a feud with Hogan, and developed a short-lived angle where he was "possessed", even attacking his old WWF opponent Randy Savage at the first Uncensored. He returned to wrestling, explained on-air by having Flair nag Hogan for months until Hogan and Savage both petitioned WCW management to let Flair come back. Upon returning, Flair revived his 1992 feud with Savage, but also got Savage's father Angelo Poffo involved after he put him in a figure four leglock at Slamboree '95: A Legends' Reunion.

On April 29, 1995, Flair wrestled Antonio Inoki in front of 190,000 spectators in Pyongyang, North Korea at the May Day Stadium in a losing effort under a joint show between New Japan Pro-Wrestling and World Championship Wrestling. The event was broadcast on August 4, on pay-per-view under the title of Collision in Korea. In fall 1995, Flair began a feud with Arn Anderson, which culminated in a tag match that saw Flair turn on Sting to reform the new Four Horsemen with Flair as the leader, Arn Anderson, Brian Pillman, and Chris Benoit as the members. With the new Four Horsemen, Flair won the WCW World Heavyweight Championship two more times before the nWo invasion storyline began in WCW, with the first one being in December 1995 at Starrcade '95: World Cup of Wrestling, where Flair defeated Luger and Sting by count-out and then defeated Savage after all three Four Horsemen members ran to the ring and Arn Anderson knocked out Savage with brass knuckles, thus allowing Flair to pin Savage to win the match and the title. Afterwards Savage won the title back on WCW Monday Nitro after Starrcade, but Flair won the next match at SuperBrawl VI to regain the championship. During the feud, Savage's manager Miss Elizabeth turned against him and became Flair's valet. Together with Woman and Debra McMichael they would escort Flair to his matches until Miss Elizabeth was taken by the nWo in the fall and returned as Savage's valet when he joined the nWo in 1997. Flair lost the WCW World Heavyweight Championship three months later to The Giant. The feud with Savage continued with The New Four Horseman joining the Dungeon of Doom to create an Alliance to end Hulkamania. Together the factions wrestled Hogan and Savage in a triple steel cage, End of Hulkamania match; losing to the reunited Mega Powers. Afterwards, Flair went on to win the WCW US Heavyweight Championship and there were changes in the Four Horseman in 1996, as Brian Pillman left WCW and Steve "Mongo" McMichael replaced him as the fourth member.

==== Feud with the New World Order (1996–1998) ====
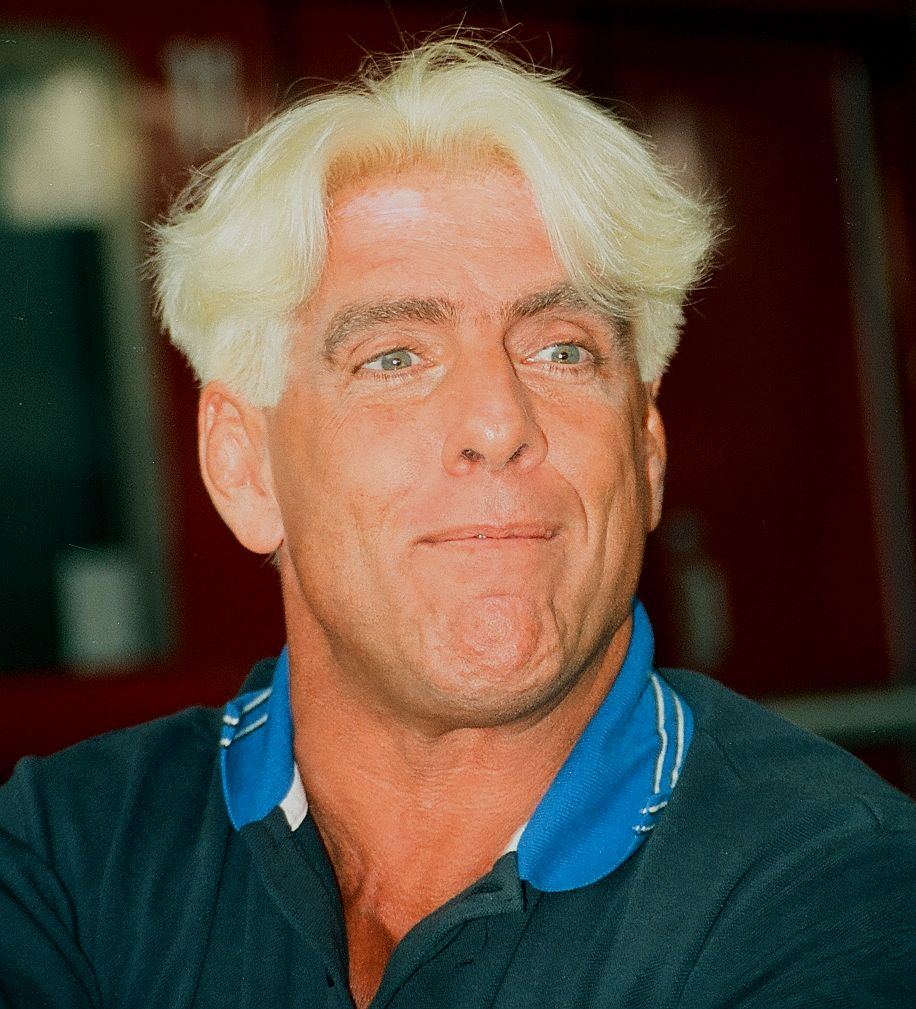
Flair in 1996

Once again as a top fan favorite, Flair played a major role in the New World Order (nWo) invasion storyline in late 1996 and throughout 1997. He and the other Horsemen often took the lead in the war against Scott Hall, Kevin Nash, and Hollywood Hulk Hogan, whom Flair immediately challenged for the WCW World Heavyweight Championship at the Clash of the Champions XXXIII, but won only by disqualification. In September 1996, Flair and Anderson teamed with their bitter rivals, Sting and Lex Luger, to lose to the nWo (Hogan, Kevin Nash, Scott Hall, and an impostor Sting) in the WarGames match at Fall Brawl '96: War Games when Luger submitted to the impostor Sting's Scorpion Deathlock.

In late September 1996, Flair suffered a rotator cuff tear while wrestling for New Japan Pro-Wrestling; the injury kept him out of the ring until May 1997. In October 1996, two developments occurred that affected the Four Horsemen when Jeff Jarrett came over to WCW from the WWF, and expressed his desire to join the Horsemen as he immediately gained a fan in Ric Flair, much to the chagrin of the other Horsemen. Flair finally let Jarrett join the group in February 1997, but the others did not want him, and in July 1997 was ultimately kicked out of the group by Flair himself, who had enough of the instability Jarrett's presence caused the Horsemen.

Flair returned to the ring in May 1997 at Slamboree, teaming with Roddy Piper and football player Kevin Greene to defeat nWo members Kevin Nash, Scott Hall, and Syxx. at The Great American Bash in June 1997, Flair teamed with Piper to unsuccessfully challenge Nash and Hall for the WCW World Tag Team Championship. This led to a bout between Flair and Piper at Bash at the Beach in July 1997, which saw Piper defeat Flair by technical submission. At Road Wild in August 1997, Flair defeated Syxx.

After Curt Hennig joined WCW in June 1997, he was courted by the Four Horsemen, taking the place of the retiring Arn Anderson. Anderson's plea that Hennig take "my spot" was lampooned by the nWo, which led to a WarGames match between the Four Horsemen and the nWo at Fall Brawl '97: War Games in September 1997. During the match, Hennig turned on the Four Horsemen and slammed the cage door onto Flair's head, joining the nWo. At Halloween Havoc in October 1997, Flair faced Hennig in a bout with Hennig's WCW United States Heavyweight Championship on the line; Hennig won by disqualification after Flair kicked the title belt into his face. At World War 3 in November 1997, Hennig defeated Flair in a no disqualification match. Flair was scheduled to face Hennig in a cage match at Starrcade in December 1997, but was injured by Hennig and the nWo, leading Diamond Dallas Page to substitute for him and defeat Hennig for the WCW United States Heavyweight Championship.

In January 1998, Flair began a feud with Bret Hart, who defeated Flair at Souled Out in his first WCW match. In April 1998, Flair disappeared from WCW television, due to a lawsuit filed by Eric Bischoff for no-showing a live episode of Thunder on April 9, 1998, in Tallahassee, Florida. During his absence from WCW, Flair considered appearing at the World Wrestling Federation's Unforgiven: In Your House pay-per-view in the Greensboro Coliseum on April 26, 1998, but ultimately did not at the advice of his lawyer.

==== WCW president; final world championship reigns (1998–2001) ====
Flair made a surprise return to WCW on September 14, 1998, to ceremoniously reform the Four Horsemen (along with Steve McMichael, Dean Malenko, and Chris Benoit). Flair feuded with Bischoff for several months afterward. Flair repeatedly raked Eric Bischoff's eyes during this feud. This culminated in a match at Starrcade between Bischoff and Flair in December 1998, which Bischoff won after interference from Curt Hennig, a former member of the Four Horsemen. The following night in Baltimore on Nitro, Flair returned and threatened to leave WCW, demanding a match against Bischoff for the presidency of the company. The match was made, and despite the nWo interfering on Bischoff's behalf Flair won and was granted the position of president of WCW.

At SuperBrawl IX, Flair challenged Hollywood Hogan for the WCW World Heavyweight Championship. Flair lost after being betrayed by his own son David Flair. In spite of his son's betrayal, Flair signed a rematch at Uncensored on March 14 which was billed as a First Blood barbed wire steel cage Match against Hogan where Flair's presidency and Hogan's WCW World Heavyweight Championship were on the line. Despite being the first to bleed, Flair won the match by pinfall thanks to the bias of the referee Charles Robinson, who counted Hogan out.

As on-air WCW President, Flair began abusing his power much like Bischoff had, favoring villains over fan favorites and even awarding the WCW United States Heavyweight Championship (which was vacated by Scott Steiner due to injury) to his son David and resorting to whatever means necessary to keep him as United States Heavyweight Champion. Flair eventually formed a stable of followers which included Roddy Piper, Arn Anderson and the Jersey Triad to keep things in order. Flair's reign as president came to an end on the July 19 episode of Nitro, when he faced and lost to Sting for the position. During the course of the match, Sting had Flair in his Scorpion Death Lock, but with the referee knocked unconscious, no decision could be reached. A returning Eric Bischoff came to the ring and began ordering the timekeeper to ring the bell, which he eventually did, awarding the match and the presidency to Sting (who promptly gave it up upon receiving it).

Flair won his last world titles in his career by winning the WCW World Heavyweight Championship twice during 2000, the company's last full year of operation. When WCW was purchased by the WWF in March 2001, Flair was the leader of the villainous group called the Magnificent Seven. Flair lost the final match of Nitro to Sting, recreating the second match of Nitro in 1995. Nevertheless, Flair has repeatedly stated in various interviews how happy he was when WCW finally closed down, although at the same time the fact that many people would lose their jobs saddened him.

=== Return to WWF / WWE (2001–2009) ===
==== WWF co-owner (2001–2002) ====
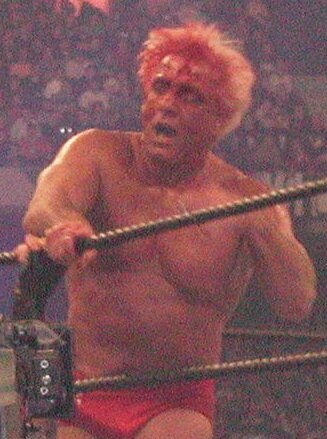
A bloodied Flair at WrestleMania X8 in 2002.

After an eight-month hiatus, Flair made a return to the WWF on November 19, 2001. Flair reappeared on Raw following the end of the "WCW/ECW Invasion" that culminated in a "Winner Take All" match at Survivor Series on November 18 won by the WWF. Flair's new on-screen role was that of the co-owner of the WWF, with the explanation that Shane and Stephanie McMahon had sold their stock in the company to a consortium (namely Flair) prior to purchasing World Championship Wrestling and Extreme Championship Wrestling (ECW). Flair's feud with Vince McMahon led them to a match at the Royal Rumble on January 20, 2002, in a Street Fight, where Flair defeated McMahon. Flair also wrestled The Undertaker at WrestleMania X8 on March 17 where Flair lost. The "co-owner" angle culminated in early 2002, when Flair controlled Raw and McMahon controlled SmackDown!

On the May 13 episode of Raw, Flair challenged Hollywood Hulk Hogan to a no disqualification match for the Undisputed WWE Championship. Flair would later lose the contest before moving onto a rivalry with Stone Cold Steve Austin. At Judgment Day on May 19, Flair teamed with Big Show and lost to Austin in a two-on-one handicap tag team match. On the June 3 episode of Raw, the feud between Flair and Austin would escalate after Austin defeated Flair in a singles contest. After Austin abruptly left the WWE in June, a match was hotshotted between Flair and McMahon for sole ownership of WWE, which Flair lost after interference from Brock Lesnar on the June 10 edition of Raw.

At King of the Ring on June 23, Flair defeated Eddie Guerrero in a singles match after Guerrero and Chris Benoit would interrupt Flair's speech regarding losing his position as WWE co-owner; afterwards, Guerrero would lock Flair in his own signature figure four leg lock with help from Benoit. Flair's rivalry with Lesnar would continue into July with Lesnar picking up wins over Flair in a singles match on the July 1 episode of Raw and in a tag team contest on the July 15 episode of Raw. Flair then became involved in a short-lived rivalry with Chris Jericho, leading to Flair defeating Jericho at SummerSlam on August 25. Flair was granted a World Heavyweight Championship match against Triple H on the September 2 episode of Raw, which he lost. Later on that same night, Flair would team with Rob Van Dam as the duo were successful in defeating the team of Triple H and Jericho. At Unforgiven on September 22, Flair was unsuccessful in capturing the WWE Intercontinental Championship in a singles contest against Jericho.

Under the WWE banner, Flair toured Japan periodically between 2002 and 2008. He successfully defended the World Tag Team Championship with Batista against The Dudley Boyz twice in February 2004. On the February 7, 2005, episode of Raw, broadcast from the Saitama Super Arena in Japan, Flair lost to Shawn Michaels in a singles match. In February 2008, Flair wrestled Mr. Kennedy in the Ariake Coliseum and William Regal in the Budokan Hall, both under the stipulation that he would retire if he lost.

==== Evolution (2002–2005) ====
On September 22 at Unforgiven, Triple H defended the World Heavyweight Championship against Rob Van Dam. During the match, Flair came down to the ring and grabbed the sledgehammer from Triple H and teased hitting him before hitting Van Dam, allowing Triple H to get the win, turning him heel in the process and accompanied Triple H to the ring as his manager. Shortly after, Batista moved from SmackDown! to Raw and Flair also began accompanying him to the ring while continuing to second Triple H. On June 15, 2003 at Bad Blood, Flair was able to defeat Shawn Michaels after Randy Orton struck Michaels with a chair.

At the height of Evolution's power, the group controlled all of the male-based championships of Raw after Armageddon on December 14. Batista teamed with Flair to win the World Tag Team Championship from the Dudley Boyz (Bubba Ray Dudley and D-Von Dudley) in a tag team turmoil match and Triple H regained the World Heavyweight Championship from Goldberg (in a triple threat match that also involved Kane), with the help of the other members of Evolution. On January 25, 2004 at the Royal Rumble, Flair and Batista successfully defended the World Tag Team Championship against the Dudley Boyz in a tables match, and World Heavyweight Champion Triple H fought Shawn Michaels to no contest in a Last Man Standing match, thus retaining the championship. Flair and Batista lost the World Tag Team Championship on February 16 edition of Raw to Booker T and Rob Van Dam. At WrestleMania XX on March 14, Evolution defeated the Rock 'n' Sock Connection (The Rock and Mick Foley) in a 3-on-2 handicap match. On the March 22 episode of Raw during the 2004 WWE draft lottery, Flair and Batista defeated Booker T and Rob Van Dam to win their second and final World Tag Team Championship, but they lost the titles to World Heavyweight Champion Chris Benoit and Edge on the April 19 episode of Raw.

At SummerSlam on August 15, Orton pinned Benoit to become the new World Heavyweight Champion and the youngest World Champion in WWE history to date. On the episode of Raw the night after SummerSlam, Batista hoisted Orton on to his shoulders in what appeared to be a celebration, but following the thumbs down from Triple H, the group proceeded to attack Orton. At Unforgiven on September 12, Flair and Batista lost to Chris Benoit and William Regal. Later that night, Triple H beat Orton to regain the World Heavyweight Championship, with help from Flair, Batista, and Jonathan Coachman. Orton's feud with Evolution continued until Survivor Series on November 14 where Triple H, Batista, Gene Snitsky, and Edge were defeated by Orton, Maven, Chris Jericho, and Chris Benoit in a Survivor Series match for control of Raw over the following month.

In the Elimination Chamber match at New Year's Revolution on January 9, 2005, Batista, Orton and Triple H were the last three remaining in the match. Orton eliminated Batista with a RKO and Triple H pinned Orton with Batista's help to win the title. Triple H suggested that Batista not enter the Royal Rumble match, wanting the group to focus on Triple H retaining the title. At the Royal Rumble on January 30, Batista declined, entered the Royal Rumble match at number 28 and won. Flair entered the match as the 30th and final entrant, but he was eliminated by Edge. Triple H tried to persuade Batista to challenge the WWE Champion John "Bradshaw" Layfield of SmackDown! rather than for his World Heavyweight Championship. This involved Triple H plotting a feud between JBL and Batista, showing JBL badmouthing Batista in an interview and staging an attack on Batista with a limousine designed to look like Layfield's. The scheme was unsuccessful and at the brand contract signing ceremony on the February 21 episode of Raw, Batista chose to remain on Raw, infuriating Triple H and thus quitting the faction. Batista defeated Triple H for the World Heavyweight Championship at WrestleMania 21 on April 3. Flair and Triple H also starred in an ad for WrestleMania 21 that parodied the film Braveheart.

After Vengeance on June 26, Triple H took time off and Flair turned face for the first time since 2002 before going on to win the Intercontinental Championship from Carlito at Unforgiven on September 18, and the group was dissolved. Triple H returned at the "Homecoming" episode of Raw on October 3 where he was to team with Flair in a tag team match against Carlito and Chris Masters. After winning that match, Triple H betrayed Flair and attacked him with a sledgehammer. Flair retained the Intercontinental Championship against Triple H at Taboo Tuesday on November 1 in a steel cage match, which was voted as such by the fans. Flair later lost to Triple H in an acclaimed Last Man Standing non-title match at Survivor Series on November 27, which ended their feud.

==== Final storylines and first retirement (2005–2008) ====
At the end of 2005, Flair had a feud with Edge (which included Flair successfully defending the Intercontinental Championship against Edge by disqualification at New Year's Revolution on January 8, 2006) that culminated in a WWE Championship Tables, Ladders, and Chairs match on the January 16 episode of Raw, which Flair lost. On the February 20 episode of Raw, Flair lost the Intercontinental Championship to Shelton Benjamin, thus ending his reign at 155 days. Flair took some time off in mid-2006 to rest and marry for the third time and he returned in June to work a program with his real-life rival Mick Foley that played off their legitimate past animosity. Flair defeated Foley at Vengeance on June 25 in a two out of three falls match, then at SummerSlam on August 20 in an "I quit" match.

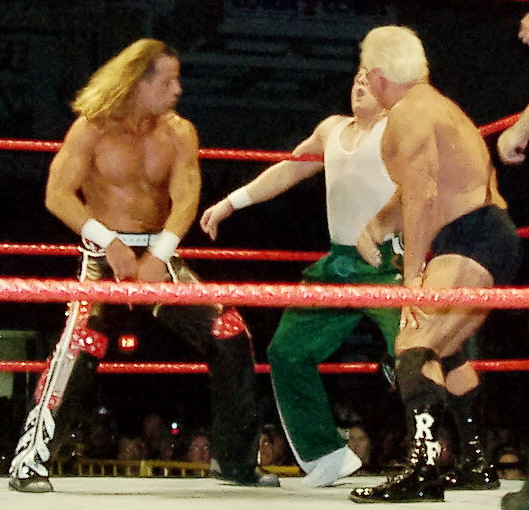
Flair and Shawn Michaels deliver knife-edged chops to Kenny Dykstra of the Spirit Squad in 2006

Subsequently, he was involved in a rivalry with the Spirit Squad on Raw. On November 5 at Cyber Sunday, he captured the World Tag Team Championship from the Spirit Squad with Roddy Piper. On the November 13 episode of Raw, Flair and Piper lost the World Tag Team Championship to Rated-RKO, due to a disc problem with Piper and had to be flown immediately back to the United States as soon as Raw was off the air. On November 26 at Survivor Series, Flair was the sole survivor of a match that featured himself, Ron Simmons (replacing an injured Piper), Dusty Rhodes and Sgt. Slaughter versus the Spirit Squad.

Flair then began teaming with Carlito after Flair said that Carlito had no heart. Flair defeated Carlito in a match on the February 15, 2007 episode of Raw after which Carlito realized that Flair was right. Flair and Carlito faced off against Lance Cade and Trevor Murdoch in a number one contender's match for the World Tag Team Championship, but were defeated. The two teamed up on the WrestleMania 23 pre-show on April 1, and defeated the team of Chavo Guerrero and Gregory Helms. After weeks of conflict between Flair and Carlito, the team split up when Carlito attacked Flair during a match on the April 30 episode of Raw. At Judgment Day on May 20, Flair defeated Carlito with the figure four leglock.

On the June 11 episode of Raw, Flair was drafted to the SmackDown! brand as part of the 2007 WWE draft. He briefly feuded against Montel Vontavious Porter, unsuccessfully challenging him for the WWE United States Championship at Vengeance: Night of Champions on June 24. Flair rejoined forces with Batista to feud with The Great Khali; the alliance was short-lived, however, as Flair was "injured" during a match with Khali on the August 3 episode of SmackDown!.

After a three-month hiatus, Flair returned to WWE programming on the November 26 episode of Raw to announce "I will never retire". Vince McMahon retaliated by announcing that the next match Flair lost would result in a forced retirement. Later in the night, Flair defeated Orton after a distraction by Chris Jericho. It was revealed on the 15th anniversary of Raw that the win or retire ultimatum only applied in singles matches. Flair won several "career threatening" matches against the opponents such as Triple H on the December 31 episode of Raw, Umaga, Montel Vontavious Porter at the Royal Rumble on January 27, 2008, William Regal, Mr. Kennedy at No Way Out on February 17, and Vince McMahon himself among others. On March 29, Flair was inducted into the WWE Hall of Fame as a part of the class of 2008 by Triple H. The day after on March 30, Flair wrestled at WrestleMania XXIV in Orlando, Florida, losing to Shawn Michaels. The match was lauded by fans and critics and was voted the 2008 Pro Wrestling Illustrated (PWI) Match of the Year. Flair's fight to keep his career going garnered him the 2008 PWI "Most Inspirational Wrestler of the Year" award.

==== Part-time appearances (2008–2009) ====
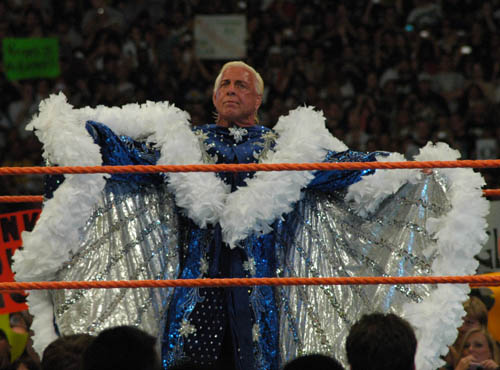
Flair at WrestleMania XXIV in March 2008

On the March 31, 2008 episode of Raw, Flair delivered his farewell address. Afterward, Triple H brought out many current and retired superstars to thank Flair for all he had done, including Shawn Michaels, some of the Four Horsemen, Ricky Steamboat, Harley Race, and Chris Jericho, followed by The Undertaker and then Vince McMahon. Along with the wrestlers, the fans gave Flair a standing ovation. This event represented a rare moment in WWE as both the heels and the faces broke character and came out to the ring together. Flair made his first post retirement appearance on the June 16 episode of Raw to confront Chris Jericho about his actions during a rivalry with Shawn Michaels. He challenged Jericho to a fight in the parking lot, rather than an official match, but Jericho was stopped by Triple H.

The following year on February 9, 2009, Flair once again confronted Jericho on Raw. Jericho was attacking Hall of Fame members and Flair demanded he respect them, before punching Jericho. Flair appeared a month later to distract him during a Money in the Bank Qualifying Match. Jericho then challenged Flair to come out of retirement for WrestleMania 25 on April 5; instead Flair managed Roddy Piper, Jimmy Snuka and Ricky Steamboat in a three-on-one handicap match at WrestleMania in a losing effort. On May 17, Flair returned during the Judgment Day pay-per-view, coming to the aid of Batista, who was being attacked by The Legacy (Randy Orton, Cody Rhodes and Ted DiBiase). On the June 1, 2009 episode of Raw, Flair challenged Orton in a parking lot brawl match, and after interference from the rest of The Legacy, the fight ended with Flair trapped inside a steel cage and punted by Orton.

=== Ring of Honor and the Hulkamania Tour (2009) ===
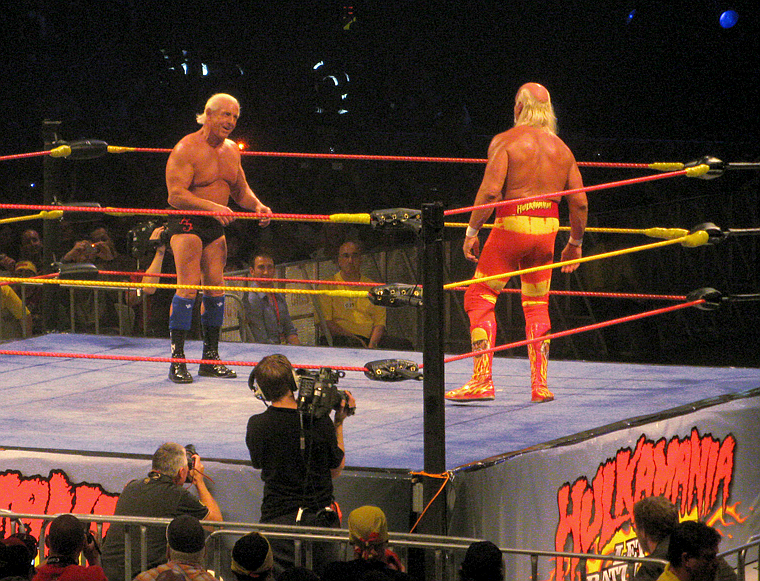
The main event of Hulkamania tour in 2009, Flair vs. Hulk Hogan

Flair signed with Ring of Honor (ROH) and appeared at the Stylin' And Profilin' event in March 2009, clearing the ring after an ROH World Championship match ended with a run-in. He soon served as the company's ambassador, in an on-screen authority role, and appeared on the television show Ring of Honor Wrestling in May to cement his role. After a number one contender's match ended in a time-limit draw, and the following week a double count out, Flair announced Ring of Honor Wrestling's first ROH World Title match as a four-way contest.

On November 21, 2009, Flair returned to the ring as a villain on the "Hulkamania: Let The Battle Begin" tour of Australia, losing to Hulk Hogan in the main event of the first show by brass knuckles. Hogan defeated Flair again on November 24 in Perth, Australia after both men bled heavily. Flair also lost to Hogan on the two remaining matches on the tour.

=== Total Nonstop Action Wrestling (2010–2012) ===
==== Debut; Fortune (2010) ====
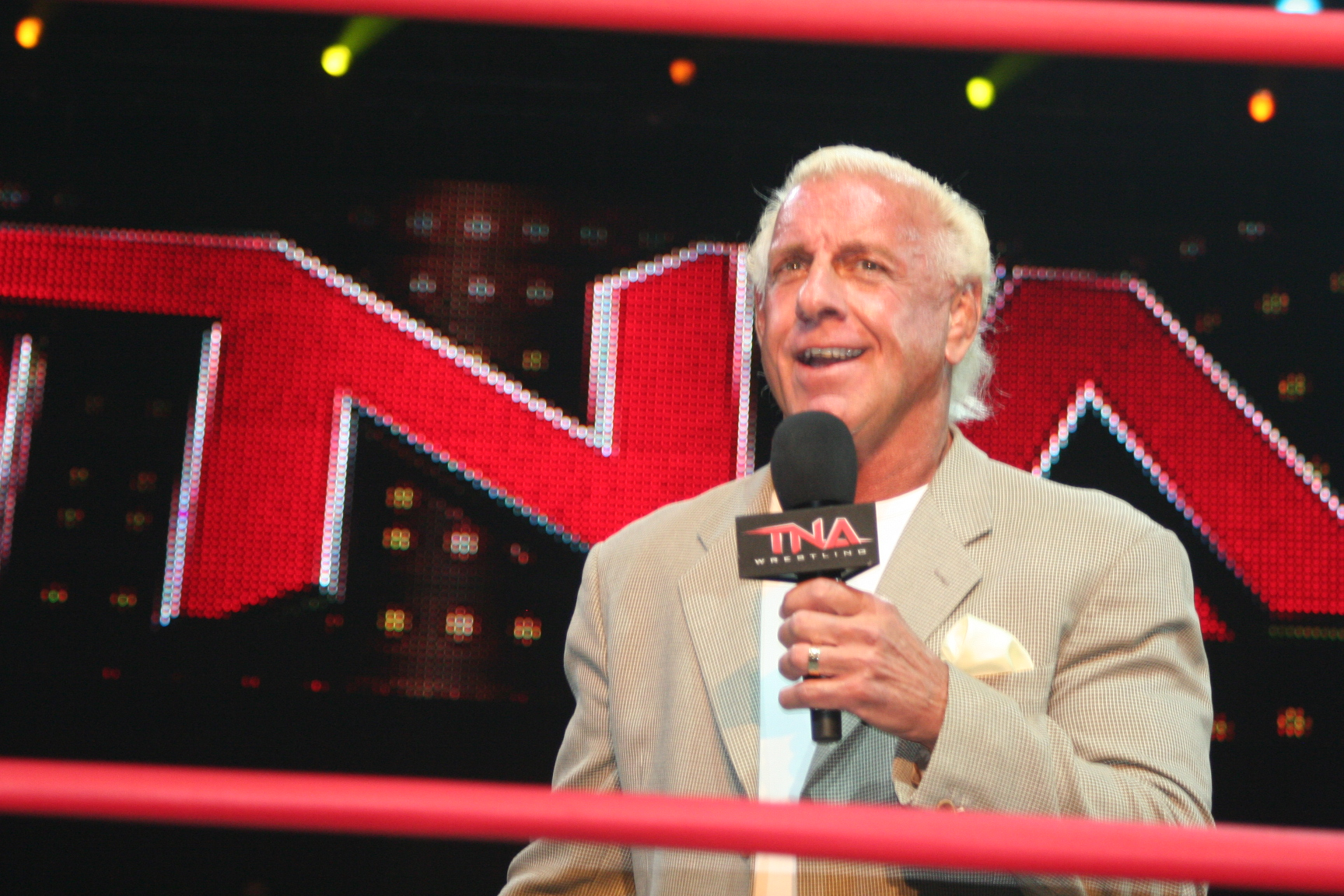
Flair in TNA in 2010

On the January 4, 2010, episode of Total Nonstop Action Wrestling's (TNA) Impact!, Flair made his debut appearance for the company arriving via limo and later observing the main event between A.J. Styles and longtime rival Kurt Angle. It was later reported that Flair had signed a one-year deal with the company. In the past, Flair had openly stated that he was loyal to the McMahons and wanted to end his career in WWE, however he had not had contact from WWE since June 2009 and decided to sign with TNA after waiting for the call from WWE for six months. On January 17 at Genesis, Flair helped Styles cheat to pin Angle and retain the TNA World Heavyweight Championship.

In addition to Styles, Flair began informally managing Beer Money, Inc. (Robert Roode and James Storm) and Desmond Wolfe as a loose alliance. On the March 8 episode of Impact!, Hulk Hogan and Abyss defeated Flair and Styles when Abyss pinned Styles. Afterwards, the returning Jeff Hardy saved Abyss and Hogan from a beatdown at the hands of Flair, Styles and Beer Money, Inc. At Lockdown on April 18, Team Flair (Ric Flair, Sting, Desmond Wolfe, Robert Roode and James Storm) was defeated by Team Hogan (Hulk Hogan, Abyss, Jeff Jarrett, Jeff Hardy and Rob Van Dam) in a Lethal Lockdown match. On the April 26 episode of Impact!, Flair was defeated by Abyss in a match where Flair's and Hogan's WWE Hall of Fame rings were at stake, and as a result Flair lost possession of his ring to Hogan. The following week, Hogan gave the ring to Jay Lethal, who returned it to Flair out of respect. This, however, was not enough for Flair, who attacked Lethal along with the members of Team Flair. After Styles dropped the TNA World Heavyweight Championship to Rob Van Dam, then failed to regain it in a rematch and later was pinned by Jay Lethal, Flair adopted Kazarian as his newest protégé, seemingly replacing Styles as his number one wrestler.

On the June 17 episode of Impact!, Flair announced that he would reform the Four Horsemen under the new name Fourtune, a group consisting of A.J. Styles, Kazarian, Robert Roode, and James Storm. Flair made a return to the ring on July 11 at Victory Road, losing to Jay Lethal. On the August 5 episode of Impact!, Flair faced Lethal in a rematch, this time contested under Street Fight rules, with the members of Fourtune banned from ringside; Flair managed to win the match after an interference from Douglas Williams. The following week, Williams and Matt Morgan were added to Fourtune. In the weeks leading to Bound for Glory on October 10, Flair's stable's name was tweaked to Fortune to represent the expansion in the number of members in the group. On the October 7 episode of Impact!, Flair was defeated by Mick Foley in a Last Man Standing match.

==== Immortal and second retirement (2010–2012) ====
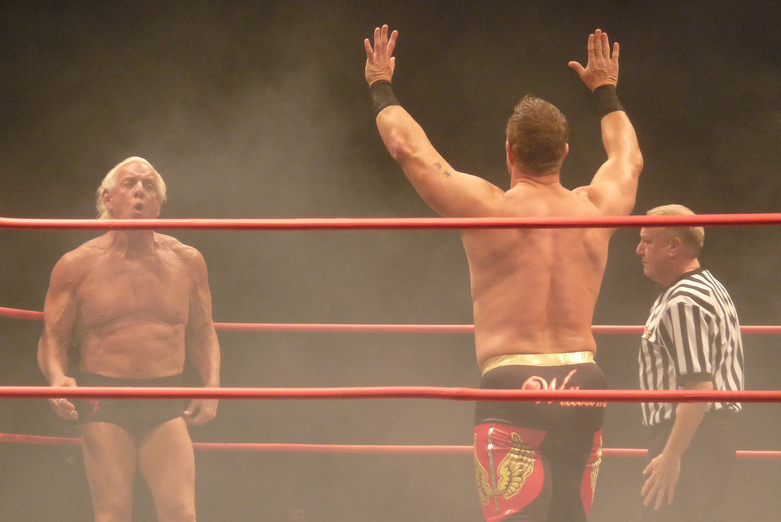
Flair (left) against Douglas Williams in London, England on the TNA Maximum Impact! Tour, in January 2011.

On the October 14, 2010 episode of Impact!, Fortune formed an alliance with Hulk Hogan's and Eric Bischoff's new stable, Immortal. On the November 18 episode of Impact!, Flair returned to the ring, competing in a match where he faced Matt Morgan, who had been kicked out of Fortune the previous month; Morgan won the match after Douglas Williams turned on the rest of Fortune, when they interfered in the match. On January 25, 2011, it was reported that Flair had pulled out of TNA's Maximum Wooo! tour of Europe mid–tour after monetary disputes. After missing a show in Berlin, Germany, Flair returned to the tour on January 27 in Glasgow, Scotland, reportedly apologizing to the locker room prior to the show. On January 29, Flair wrestled his only match of the tour, defeating Douglas Williams in London, tearing his rotator cuff in the process. During Flair's time away from TNA, Fortune turned on Immortal.

Flair returned at the February 14, 2011 Impact! tapings, turning on Fortune during a match between A.J. Styles and Matt Hardy and jumping to Immortal. On the March 10 episode of Impact!, Flair defeated Styles and Hardy in a three–way street fight, contested as more of a two–on–one handicap match. On April 17 at Lockdown, Immortal, represented by Flair, Abyss, Bully Ray and Matt Hardy, was defeated by Fortune members James Storm, Kazarian and Robert Roode and Christopher Daniels, who replaced an injured A.J. Styles, in a Lethal Lockdown match, when Flair tapped out to Roode. The match was used to write Flair off television, as the following week he was scheduled to undergo surgery for his torn rotator cuff; however, Flair ultimately chose not to have the surgery as it would have required six months of rehab.

Flair returned to television in a non–wrestling role on the May 12, 2011 episode of Impact Wrestling. Flair did not appear again for three months, until making his return on August 9 at the tapings of the August 18 episode of Impact Wrestling, confronting old rival Sting and challenging him to one more match. In exchange for Sting agreeing to put his career on the line, Flair promised to deliver him his match with Hogan if he was victorious. The match, which Flair lost, took place on the September 15 episode of Impact Wrestling. The match with Sting would be the last of his career to date. During the match, Flair tore his left triceps on a superplex spot, sidelining him indefinitely from in-ring action. At Bound for Glory on October 16, Flair appeared in Hogan's corner in his match against Sting. Flair continued to make appearances for TNA until April 2012. In April 2012, Flair tried to have his TNA contract terminated, which led to TNA filing a lawsuit against WWE for contract tampering and eventually firing Flair on May 11. Having been inactive since his September 2011 injury, Flair announced in a December 3, 2012, interview that he would never wrestle again, owing chiefly to an on-air heart attack suffered by age peer Jerry Lawler following a Raw match three months earlier.

=== Second return to WWE (2012–2021) ===
On March 31, 2012, while still contracted to TNA as a part of a deal with WWE which allowed Christian Cage to appear at Slammiversary 10, Flair became the first person to be inducted into the WWE Hall of Fame twice, the second time as part of the class of 2012 with The Four Horsemen. On December 17, 2012, Flair returned to WWE as a non-wrestling personality on the annual Slammy Awards show to present the Superstar of the Year award to John Cena, who in turn gave the award to Flair. Flair's return was interrupted by CM Punk and Paul Heyman, escalating into a confrontation that ended with him locking Heyman in the figure-four leglock. After clearing the ring, Flair was assaulted by The Shield (Dean Ambrose, Roman Reigns, and Seth Rollins), until Ryback and Team Hell No (Kane and Daniel Bryan) helped Flair fend off the group.

Flair appeared with WWE sporadically throughout 2013, as The Miz's mentor. He also occasionally appeared on NXT in 2013 and 2014, accompanying his daughter Charlotte to the ring.

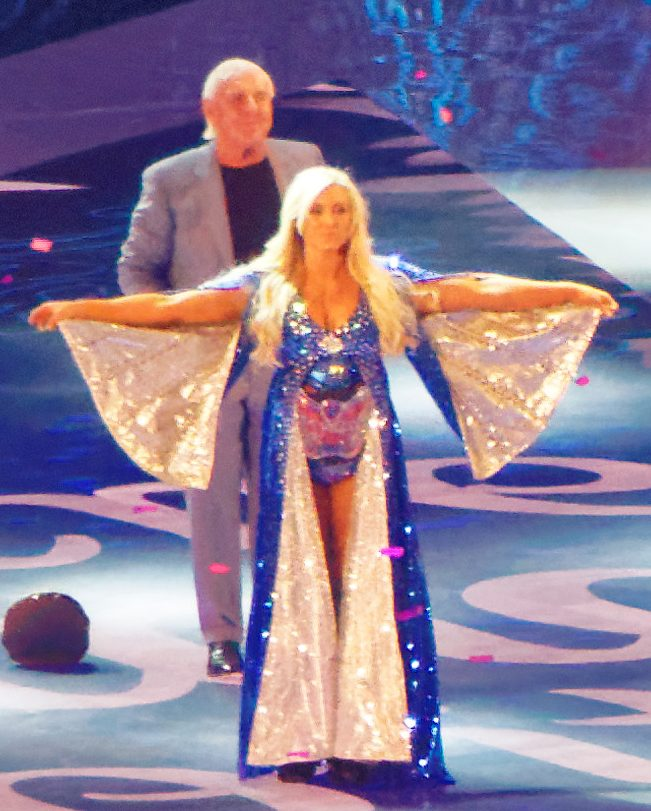
Flair accompanying his daughter, Charlotte Flair to the ring at WrestleMania 32

Flair appeared on the April 28, 2014, episode of Raw, alongside the reunited Evolution (minus Flair) and The Shield; Flair showed his endorsement for The Shield, Evolution's opponents at Extreme Rules, effectively turning his back on his old teammates. At Battleground, John Cena symbolically handed over his World Heavyweight Championship belt to Flair, telling him to "take it" while promoting his match. On the post-SummerSlam Raw in August 2015, Flair interrupted Jon Stewart, who had saved Flair's 16 world title record by preventing Cena's victory the previous night, telling him that the record would be broken eventually and he would rather it be by someone who he respects.

Flair began making more frequent appearances with Charlotte after she won the Divas Championship. In January 2016, Flair and Charlotte began displaying villainous traits, with Flair often getting involved in Charlotte's Divas Championship and later WWE Women's Championship defenses, thus turning heel for the first time since 2005 in WWE. This lasted until the May 23 episode of Raw when Charlotte turned on him. On the November 28 episode of Raw, Flair returned to congratulate the new Raw Women's Champion Sasha Banks, who had defeated Charlotte to win the title, thus turning face once again. Flair made a surprise appearance during the November 14, 2017, episode of SmackDown to congratulate his daughter Charlotte Flair, who won the SmackDown Women's Championship. They shared an emotional moment on the ramp and did his iconic strut.

On the February 25, 2019, episode of Raw, WWE celebrated Flair's 70th birthday and during the closing moments, Flair was attacked by Batista. The actual "attack" was never seen, only Flair being dragged by Batista. At WrestleMania 35, Flair assisted Triple H in defeating Batista, to keep his in-ring career going. Flair appeared on the July 22 Raw Reunion episode and raised a toast alongside Triple H, Hulk Hogan, "Stone Cold" Steve Austin, and various other fellow wrestlers of his era. In June 2020, Flair came back to WWE programming as a heel again, managing Randy Orton for a few weeks until the August 10 episode of Raw when Orton performed a punt kick on Flair's head. On November 22, 2020, he made an appearance at Survivor Series during The Undertaker's retirement ceremony.

On the January 4, 2021, episode of Raw, Flair started a storyline with Lacey Evans, when during a match against Women's Tag Team Champions Charlotte Flair and Asuka, Evans flirted with Flair. During the following weeks, Flair managed Evans, usually distracting his daughter Charlotte, including a participation in the Women's Royal Rumble. On the February 15 episode of Raw, Evans' real-life pregnancy was announced and incorporated into a storyline with Flair impregnating Lacey. Evans was scheduled to face Asuka for Raw Women's Championship at Elimination Chamber but the match was canceled due to her pregnancy and the storyline with Flair was canceled. On August 2, 2021, it was reported by Wrestling Inc. that Flair had asked for and was granted his release from WWE. WWE confirmed his release the following day and considered it effective as of August 3.

=== Sporadic appearances; "Ric Flair's Last Match" (2021–2023) ===
On August 14, 2021, at Triplemanía XXIX, Flair made his Lucha Libre AAA Worldwide (AAA) debut by accompanying Charlotte's then fiancé Andrade "El Ídolo" to ringside during his match against AAA Mega Champion Kenny Omega. Flair would later get involved in the match by chopping Omega and applying the Figure Four leglock to Omega's second Konnan.

On August 29, 2021, Flair made his return to the NWA at the NWA 73rd Anniversary Show. It was his first NWA appearance since 2008 when he was inducted into the NWA Hall of Fame. At NWA 73, Flair thanked the NWA and WWE for several memorable moments and noted the importance of having several companies in the industry.

On May 16, 2022, it was announced that Flair would wrestle his final match on July 31 in Nashville, called Ric Flair's Last Match, finally retiring after nearly five decades in the ring. On July 18, it was announced that Flair would team with his son-in-law Andrade El Ídolo against Jeff Jarrett and Jay Lethal. As part of the promo setting up the match, Lethal attacked Flair over being left out of the match card. Jarrett initially tried to help Flair, but attacked him after he rebuffed him and used expletives against his family. Flair and Andrade would go on to win the match. Flair later confirmed that he had passed out twice during the Last Match and regretted announcing that it would be his final match.

Flair accompanied Andrade during his match against Carlito at the 49th WWC Anniversary show held on August 6, 2022. Flair attempted to interfere before poking Primo Colón when he tried to stop him, causing Carlos Colón to attack him and forcing him to flee. Andrade would go on to lose the match.

During the celebrations for the 50th anniversary of his debut in professional wrestling on September 26, 2022, Flair announced that he would never retire. In January 2023, however, he stated that he did not want to wrestle again aside from wanting to redo the Last Match. In January 2025, Flair stated that he would never return to the ring.

=== All Elite Wrestling (2023–present) ===
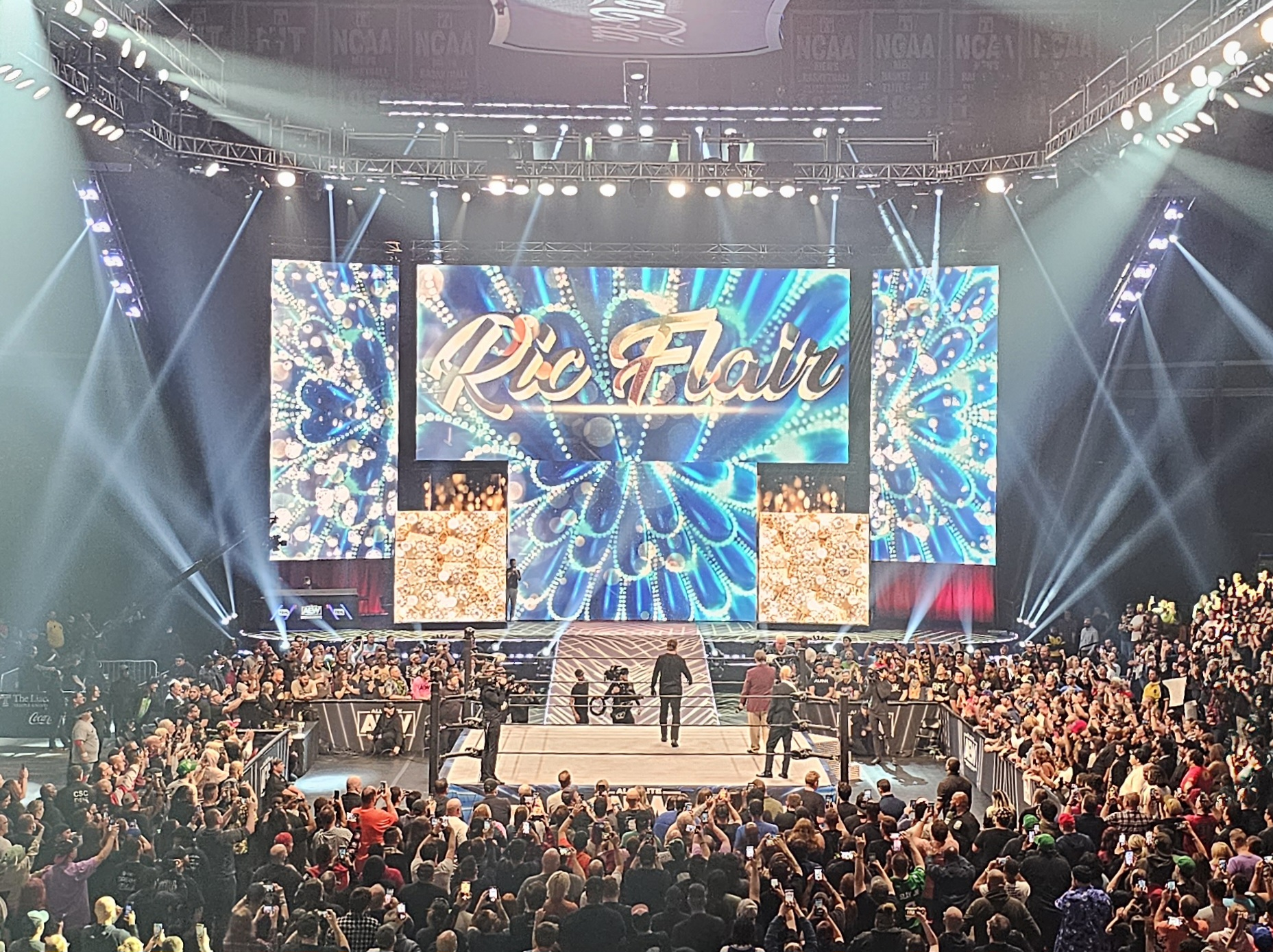
Flair making his All Elite Wrestling debut, October 25, 2023

On the October 25, 2023 episode of AEW Dynamite, Flair made his AEW debut as a "gift" from company founder Tony Khan to Sting ahead of his retirement. In November, Flair signed a multi-year contract with AEW. He accompanied Sting, Darby Allin and Adam Copeland for their match against The Patriarchy at Full Gear on November 18. Flair continued appearing alongside Sting and Allin during Sting's retirement storyline, including at Revolution on March 3, 2024, where Sting competed in his retirement match against The Young Bucks. On May 14, 2025, Flair appeared at the tribute segment for Steve McMichael. On November 12, he was scheduled to appear at Blood & Guts, but did not appear during the televised broadcast and instead appeared before the show went on the air. Flair later confirmed that he had attended the event but left early due to a rotator cuff injury.

== Legacy ==
Flair was often popular with the crowd due to his in-ring antics, including rulebreaking (earning him the distinction of being "the dirtiest player in the game"), strutting and his shouting of "Woooooooo!", getting that inspiration from Jerry Lee Lewis' "Great Balls of Fire". The "Wooo!" yell (Note: "Wooo!" is officially spelled with four o's according to his autobiography, but can extend to any number of o's.) has since become a tribute to Flair, and is often shouted by the crowd whenever a wrestler performs a knife-edge chop, one of Flair's signature moves. It is also often shouted by the crowd whenever a wrestler utilizes Flair's figure-four leglock finisher.

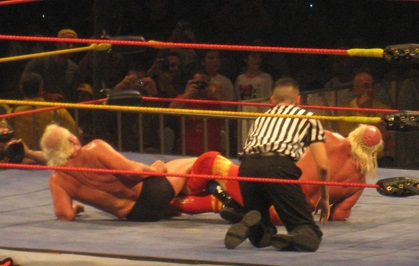
Flair performing his signature figure-four leglock on Hulk Hogan during the Hulkamania tour

One of Professional Wrestling's biggest draws, Hulk Hogan, has said he himself is "number two" behind Ric Flair, who is the greatest wrestler of all time.

From the late-1970s, Flair wore ornate fur-lined robes of many colors with sequins during in-ring appearances, and since the early 1980s, his approach to the ring was usually heralded by the playing of the "Dawn" section of Richard Strauss' "Also sprach Zarathustra" (famous for being used in the 1968 motion picture 2001: A Space Odyssey and for the introduction to Elvis Presley's concerts of the 1970s). Flair also described himself as a "limousine-ridin', jet-flyin', kiss stealin', wheelin' dealin', son-of-a-gun (who kissed all the girls worldwide and made em cry)".

On April 29, 1995, Ric Flair fought Antonio Inoki in the main event match of Collision in Korea Day 2. The event registered an attendance of 165,000 people, the largest crowd in professional wrestling history.

On October 19, 1998, it was declared "Ric Flair Day" in Minneapolis, Minnesota by Mayor Sharon Sayles Belton and on November 15, 2008, it was declared "Ric Flair Day" in Norfolk, Virginia. On March 24, 2008, Mayor Bob Coble, of Columbia, South Carolina, declared March 24 to be Ric Flair Day in Columbia. Flair also received the key to the city. He received the key to the city of Greensboro, North Carolina on December 5, 2008, to commemorate Flair's victory in a steel cage match against Harley Race at the inaugural Starrcade event. April 18, 2009, was declared "Ric Flair Day" in Charleston, West Virginia and he was presented with the key to the city by the mayor. Also, on June 12, 2009, Flair was presented with the key to the city of Myrtle Beach, South Carolina and, in September, he received the key to the city in Marion County, South Carolina. On July 17, 2010, Flair made a special appearance at Scotland Motors in Laurinburg, North Carolina and received the key to that city, as well.

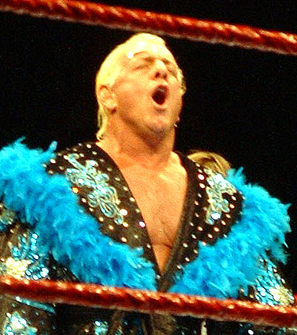
Flair yelling "Wooooo!"

On the February 18, 2008, episode of Raw, Shawn Michaels announced Flair as the first inductee into the WWE Hall of Fame class of 2008. The induction ceremony took place on March 29, 2008, with Triple H inducting him. This made him the first person to be inducted while still an active competitor. Flair was later inducted into the NWA Hall of Fame in Atlanta, Georgia, but he did not participate in the event. On January 9, 2012, it was announced that the Four Horsemen would be inducted into the WWE Hall of Fame, thus making Flair the first person to have been inducted into the Hall of Fame twice.

On April 15, 2008, Flair was honored in Congress by a representative from North Carolina, Republican Sue Myrick, who praised his career and what he means to the state. On September 29, 2008, it was announced that Flair's signature sequin covered robe that he wore at WrestleMania XXIV, in what was to be his last WWE match, would be placed in the pop culture section of the National Museum of American History in Washington, D.C.

In 1999, a large group of professional wrestling experts, analysts and historians named Flair the greatest NWA World Heavyweight Champion of all time. In 2002, Flair was named the greatest professional wrestler of all time in the book The Top 100 Wrestlers of All Time by John Molinaro, edited by Dave Meltzer and Jeff Marek. in July 2016, Luke Winkie of Sports Illustrated also named Flair the greatest professional wrestler of all time.

Flair's "Wooo" chant has been used throughout pop culture. Rapper Pusha T paid homage to Flair in numerous songs. For example, on the track "Sweet Serenade", he says, "Triple doubles, two hoes and check please (Wooo!), They love me on my Ric Flair shit (Wooo!), In that Phantom like I'm Blair Witch (Wooo!), Who are you to be compared with? (Wooo!)". Atlanta-based rapper Killer Mike also has a track named "Ric Flair". American trap musicians Offset and Metro Boomin paid tribute to Flair in their hit song "Ric Flair Drip". The Battle of Gettysburg Podcast, hosted by battlefield guides and wrestling fans Jim Hessler and Eric Lindblade, often cites Flair's "Wooo" chant as well as other elements of Flair's mystique.

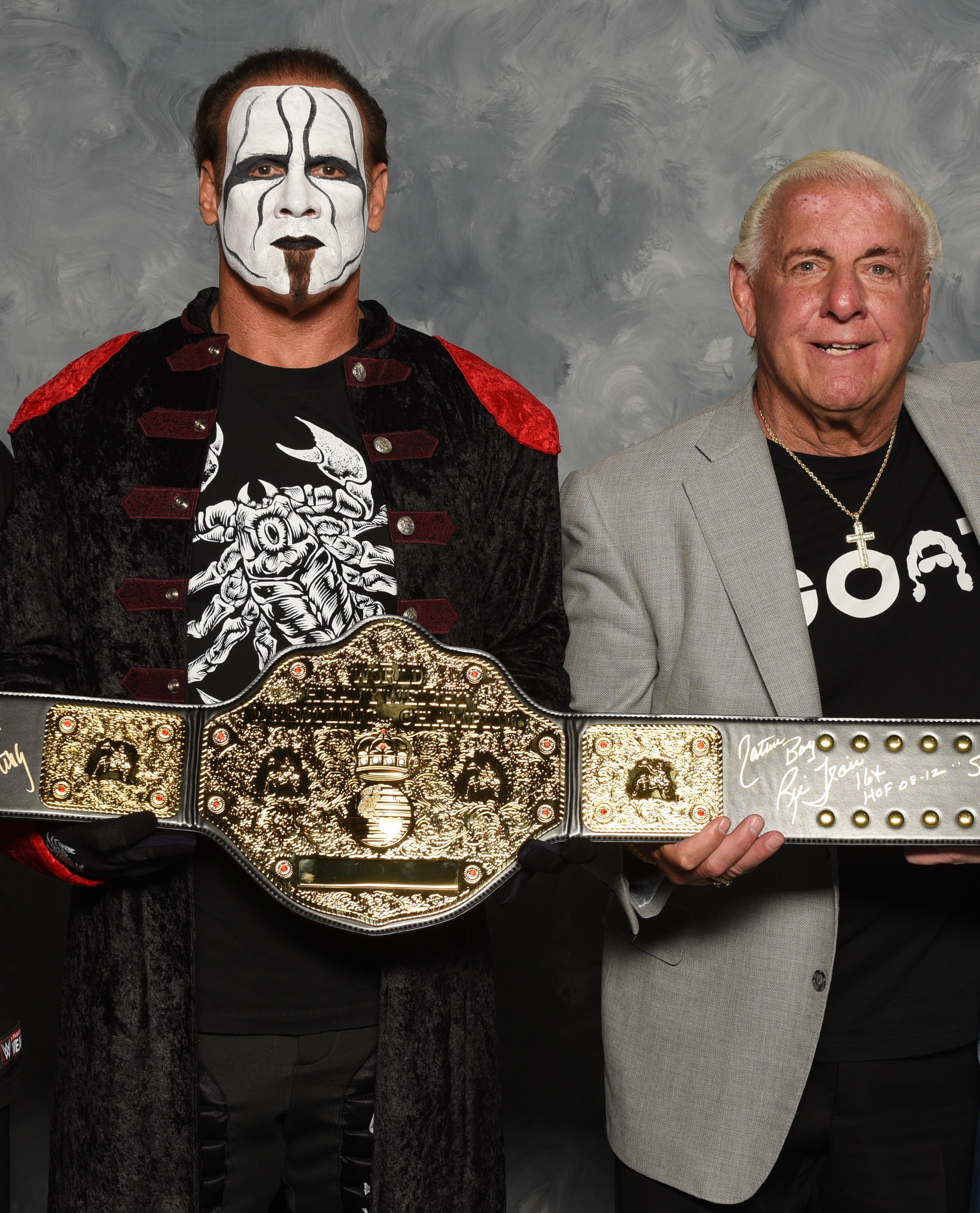
Sting and Ric Flair pose with a replica of the Big Gold Belt

=== Reaction to later career ===
Some have looked unfavorably upon Flair's career from the mid-1990s onward. In 1998, wrestler and former WCW colleague Stone Cold Steve Austin said that Flair had reached the "time to hang it up", having not been great for a "long time". John Molinaro of Slam! Sports penned a 1999 article titled, "Ric Flair is tarnishing his legacy"; Molinaro saw Flair as a wrestler whose prestige was "in jeopardy". In 2006, Pro Wrestling Illustrated writer Frank Ingiosi said that Flair had a "personal vendetta against his legend". He nevertheless continued to wrestle until originally retiring in 2008, at age 59.

Despite the unfavorable reviews for continuing to wrestle, many of his later career matches were praised. The match between Flair and Shawn Michaels at WrestleMania 24 in 2008 was named as the "match of the decade" by popular professional wrestling magazine Pro Wrestling Illustrated.

Flair would ultimately return to the ring in 2009 and signed to wrestle for TNA the following year, breaking a vow to never again lace up his boots. Wrestler Axl Rotten, NFL writer Adam Rank, and many fans felt that he sullied his legend by continuing to wrestle in TNA. Asked in 2011 if Flair was tainting his prestige, former opponent Shane Douglas was harsher, stating that he had "been tarnishing his legacy since 1990". Also that year, Kevin Eck of The Baltimore Sun criticized the aging Flair for being unable to separate himself from his ostentatious gimmick when not wrestling, and said: "I don't know what's sadder, Ric Flair tarnishing his legacy in the ring or embarrassing himself away from the ring". Asked about Flair in 2015, wrestler The Honky Tonk Man felt that viewers would "remember only the last years of his career", which consist of "bad memories".

Conversely, professional wrestling announcer Jim Ross in 2012 felt that Flair had not tarnished his legacy, observing only "passion and need to earn a living". In 2016, Flair said continuing to wrestle in TNA was the "number one" regret of his career.

== Other media ==
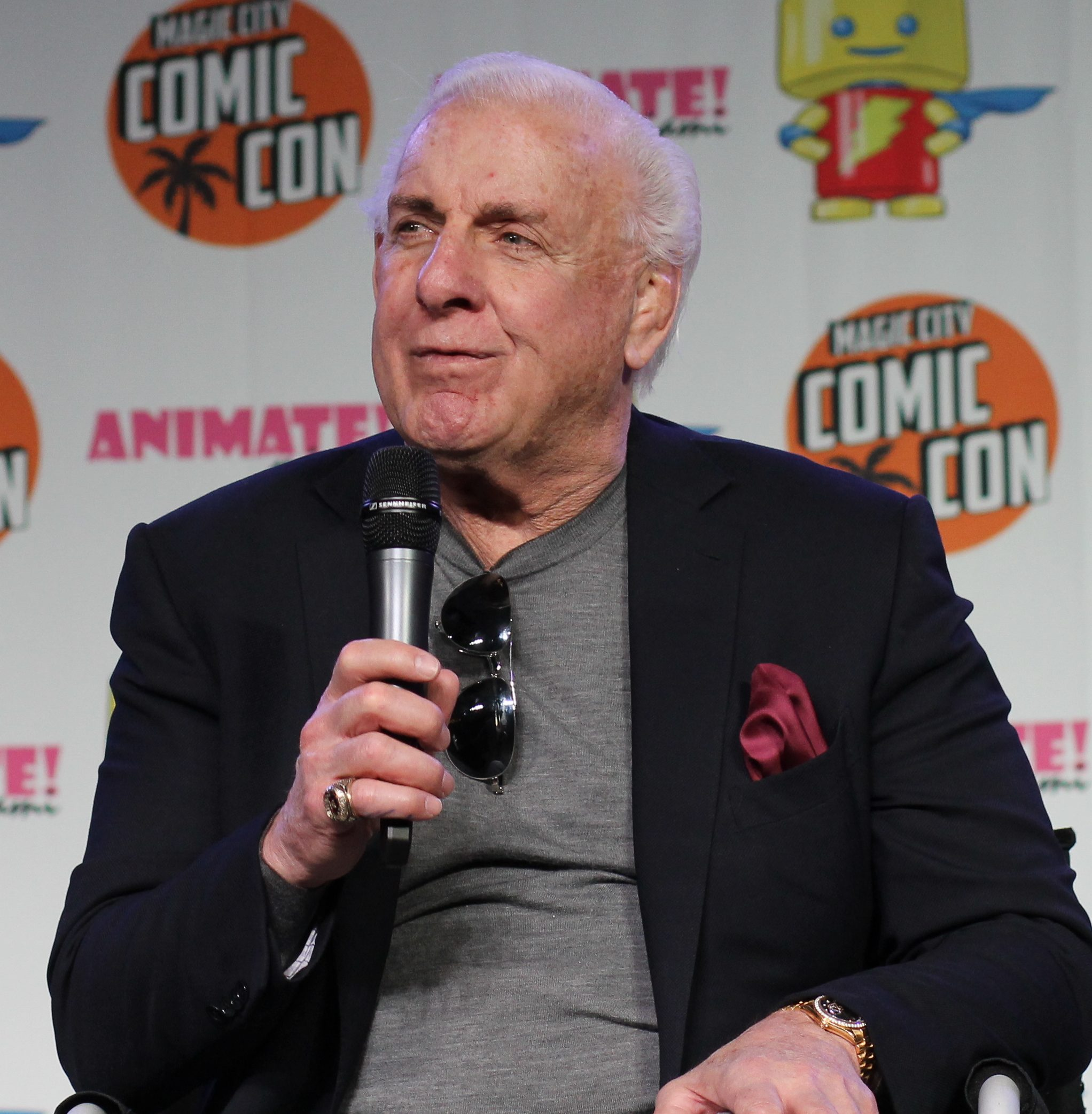
Flair at a Comic Con event in 2016

Flair has made numerous appearances in television shows. In 1996, Flair, along with other WCW wrestlers, appeared in an episode of Baywatch as themselves. In 2013, Flair made an appearance in Stuff You Should Know, in the episode, "Bacteriopolis", as Dr. Roland Grayson. In 2014, Flair voiced himself in the animated series, Uncle Grandpa, in the episode, "History of Wrestling". In 2011, Flair voiced himself in the animated series, The Cleveland Show, in the episode, "BFFs".

Flair released his autobiography, To Be the Man, on June 29, 2004. The title is taken from one of his catchphrases, "To be the man, you gotta beat the man!".

In 2009, Flair voiced Commander Douglas Hill in the video game Command & Conquer: Red Alert 3 - Uprising.

In August 2012, Flair appeared at Insane Clown Posse's 13th Annual Gathering of the Juggalos weekend as a main stage host, in charge of announcing the performers. His appearance at the event was cut short after his head was barely struck by a water bottle thrown from the crowd before announcing Tech N9ne's entrance to the main stage. Flair at that point left immediately after announcing Tech N9ne and did not go back out on the main stage to announce the remaining performers. Flair's final comment before he left the main stage was "Have fun".

In 2015, Flair made his feature film debut, appearing in Magic Mike XXL. From May 2015-April 2016, Flair was host of a podcast titled "WOOOOO! Nation". The podcast was placed on hiatus after episode 46 which was uploaded on April 1, 2016. Flair returned to podcasting on MLW Radio with a new show called The Ric Flair Show in July 2016. The final episode of The Ric Flair Show was uploaded on December 16, 2016. Flair stated that the reason that he had quit the podcasting business was because he could no longer be objective when it comes to his opinion of what is happening in the WWE.

In 2017, ESPN aired Nature Boy, a 30 for 30 documentary about Flair's career directed by Rory Karpf.

On October 31, 2017, trap artists Offset and Metro Boomin released a single titled "Ric Flair Drip" from their collaborative album with 21 Savage, Without Warning, in which Flair made an appearance in the music video. In December 2017, Latin trap artist Bad Bunny released a music video entitled "Chambea", in which Flair appeared.

Flair signed an endorsement deal with online ticket exchange marketplace TickPick in August 2018. Under the agreement he would make guest posts on TickPick's blog, in addition to appearing in advertisements for the brand posted on its and his own social media channels.

Flair started appearing in an advertising campaign for CarShield in April 2021 (One of the commercials featured him alongside LA Knight, who played the role of "The Overcharger"). The company paused it in September 2021 following allegations of sexual assault made by Heidi Doyle against Flair on an episode of Dark Side of the Ring. It however resumed airing the commercials in December 2021.

In November 2021, Flair brought back his podcast "WOOOOO! Nation". It was named "Wooooo Nation Uncensored" and was co-hosted by Mark Madden. Madden quit in March 2022. He was replaced by Flair's son-in-law Conrad Thompson and the podcast was revamped into "To Be the Man" in April 2022.

Flair signed an endorsement deal with Nu Image Medical, an online telehealth and medical company, in June 2022 to promote its men's health products. WWE and the streaming service Peacock partnered to release a documentary on Flair titled Woooooo! Becoming Ric Flair on December 26.

In 2023, wrestling historian Tim Hornbaker released a book entitled The Last Real World Champion: The Legacy of the Nature Boy Ric Flair.

== Business ventures ==
Flair sells his official merchandise through his own website.

He partnered with Scout Comics in 2021 to launch a comic book series named Code Name: Ric Flair. Following allegations of sexual assault against him made on Dark Side of the Ring, Scout Comics dropped the comic and Flair started personally selling it on his website. However, later in December 2022, the company agreed to publish it through its label. It was written by Scout Comics President James Haick III and was released in April 2023.

In July 2022, Flair launched a virtual restaurant chain named "Wooooo! Wings" in Nashville, Tennessee in partnership with Kitchen Data Systems ahead of Ric Flair's Last Match. The name of the chain is based after Flair's signature exclamation. The food items of the outlet are prepared by KitchPartner restaurants, owned by Kitchen Data Systems. The chain expanded to six American cities in August 2022. Its launch and expansion was handled by Conrad Thompson.

Flair also partnered with Mike Tyson and Verano Holdings Corp. to launch his own cannabis line called the "Ric Flair Drip" under Tyson's cannabis brand "Tyson 2.0". The line launched in October 2022 in Arizona, Nevada and California.

In July 2023, Flair partnered with Carma HoldCo and LGNDS to release a mushroom-infused energy drink called Wooooo! Energy. Flair also had an apparel deal with Roots of Fight, a media and apparels brand. However, he stated in April 2026 that he was no longer allowed to be affiliated with the company due to pressure from WWE. In July 2026, Flair launched his own brand of liquor called Flair Spirits.

== Personal life ==
=== Family ===
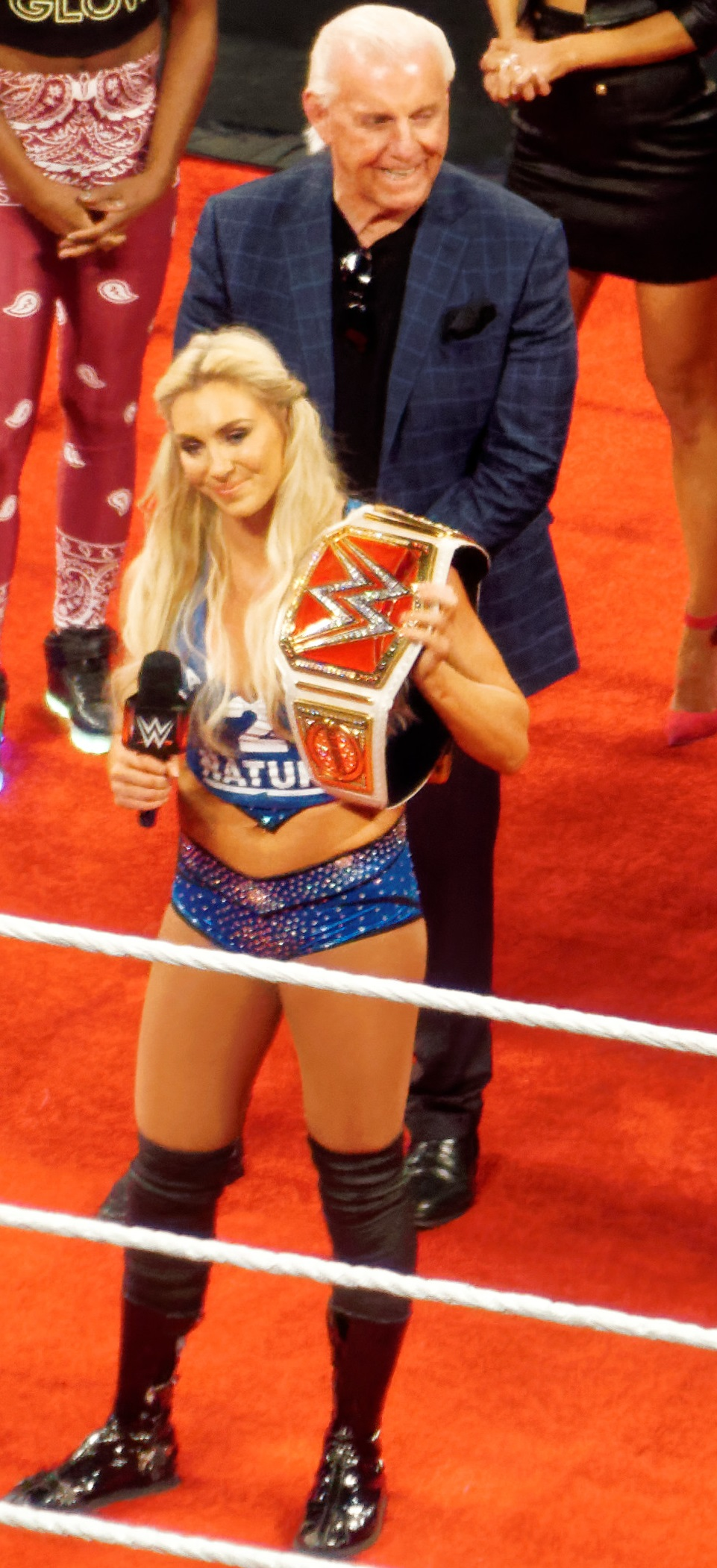
Flair (back) with his younger daughter, Ashley "Charlotte" Fliehr, in 2016

Flair married his first wife, Leslie Goodman, on August 28, 1971. Goodman was Jewish, with her grandparents wanting Flair to convert to Judaism, which he ultimately opted not to do after attending Hebrew language classes. They had two children, daughter Megan and son David. Flair and Leslie separated in 1979, before divorcing in 1983 after twelve years of marriage.

On August 27, 1983, he married his second wife, Elizabeth Harrell. Promoter Jim Crockett Jr. served as the best man for the wedding. They had two children, daughter Ashley and son Reid. Beth and their children made periodic appearances in WCW between 1998 and 2000. Flair and Beth divorced in 2006 after nearly 23 years of marriage.

On May 27, 2006, Flair married his third wife, Tiffany VanDemark, a fitness competitor. In 2008, Tiffany filed for divorce from Flair. It was finalized in 2009.

On November 11, 2009, Flair married his fourth wife, Jacqueline "Jackie" Beems, in Charlotte, North Carolina. In 2012, Flair filed for divorce from Beems, which was finalized in 2014.

On September 12, 2018, Flair, in a non-legally binding wedding ceremony, married Wendy Barlow, known as Fifi, his "maid" in WCW, at a resort in Florida. Despite having a wedding ceremony, Flair and Barlow later revealed to People in January 2022 that they were never legally married, as they never applied for a marriage certificate. On January 31, 2022, Flair announced that he and Barlow had separated. The two reconciled in May 2022, but separated again in September 2024. Flair and Barlow were acknowledged to have been in a romantic relationship for thirteen years prior to the 2024 separation. Flair and Barlow renewed their relationship for a third time in August 2026.

Flair's elder son David is a retired professional wrestler, who worked for WCW from 1999 to 2001, and made two televised appearances in the WWF in 2002 during the run-up to WrestleMania X8. Flair's younger son Reid, who signed a developmental contract with WWE near the end of 2007, was an accomplished high school wrestler, and made several appearances on WCW television along with his sister Ashley and half-sister Megan. On May 9, 2004, Flair became a grandfather at the age of 55, when his older daughter, Megan Fliehr Ketzner, gave birth to her first child, a daughter named Morgan Lee Ketzner.

On May 17, 2012, Flair's daughter, Ashley, signed with WWE, adopting the ring name Charlotte, which was later changed to include the Flair surname.

On March 29, 2013, Flair's son Reid died from a drug overdose of heroin, Xanax, and a muscle relaxant.

Sebastian Kidder, Flair's stepson through his relationship with Barlow, died by suicide on October 26, 2024.

=== Legal problems ===
In December 2005, a judge issued arrest warrants for Flair after a road rage incident that took place in Charlotte, North Carolina, in which Flair allegedly got out of his car, grabbed a motorist by the neck, and damaged his vehicle. Flair was charged with two misdemeanors, injury to personal property and simple assault and battery. This incident was ridiculed on WWE programming, most notably by the wrestler Edge.

In September 2007, Flair opened a financial business called Ric Flair Finance. In July 2008, Flair Finance filed for bankruptcy. Following Flair's debut in Total Nonstop Action Wrestling (TNA) his former employer, Ring of Honor (ROH), filed a lawsuit in 2010, alleging that Flair owed them over $40,000 and that he had not appeared at several events that he was contractually obligated to appear at. The lawsuit was never resolved.

Highspots Inc. claimed that Flair had given them the NWA World Heavyweight Championship belt as collateral for a loan. A warrant for Flair's arrest was issued in May 2011 for being held in contempt of court for violating the terms of his settlement with Highspots. If Flair had failed to comply he could have potentially faced 90 days in jail. On June 25, Highspots released a statement over their official Facebook page stating that someone had paid Flair's debts.

=== Politics ===
Flair has long supported Republican political candidates in North Carolina politics. In 2000, Flair explored the possibility of running for governor of North Carolina, but never filed the papers. Jesse Ventura stated that when Flair told him that he had received 143 speeding tickets in his life, Ventura urged him not to run.

In the 2008 presidential election, Flair declared his support for Republican presidential candidate Mike Huckabee. Said Flair, "[Huckabee] is a quality person, self-made, a great family man and he has a great vision for our country. And I'm here to excite the crowd."

Flair endorsed Ted Cruz during the 2016 presidential election.

Flair announced in 2016 that he was running for president, with rapper Waka Flocka Flame as his running mate. However, he did not file a Statement of Candidacy (FEC Form 2).

=== Health issues ===
Flair has a heart condition called alcoholic cardiomyopathy.

On August 14, 2017, Flair had surgery in Georgia to remove an obstructive piece of his bowel, which led to various complications, most seriously kidney failure, necessitating dialysis treatment and ongoing hospitalization. He was discharged from rehabilitation and allowed to return home on September 21.

Flair suffered a heart attack during his final match on July 31, 2022.

In June 2025, Flair revealed that he had been diagnosed with skin cancer for the "second time in three years."

On October 23, 2026, Flair announced that he had been dealing with blood clots in his legs and was forced to pull out of multiple conventions due to his doctor limitng his travel time to 3-4 hours. That same day, he was rushed to a hospital after falling outside of a restaurant and suffered injuries to his face and head.

== Real-life feuds and backstage problems ==
=== Teddy Long ===
WWE Hall of Famer Teddy Long claimed Flair was racist to him in his early career in the 1980s, stating "Flair walked up to me one time and asked me, he said, 'Nigger you like working here?". Long claims Flair never apologized to him and "hasn't changed over the years".

=== Bret Hart ===
Flair engaged in an off-screen rivalry with Bret Hart. In October 1993, Hart gave a radio interview in which he said Flair "sucks" and described his workplace, WCW, as "minor league". Flair, in his autobiography, accused Hart of exploiting the death of his brother Owen and the controversy surrounding the Montreal Screwjob. Flair also claimed in his autobiography that—despite Hart's popularity in Canada—he was not a formidable money-making draw in the United States, a claim which Hart dismissed as "plain ridiculous" in a column written for the Calgary Sun. Hart cited his headlining performances on consistently sold-out tours throughout his WWF career, while alleging that Flair wrestled to near-empty arenas. He also criticized Flair on what he perceived as insults to fellow wrestlers Mick Foley and Randy Savage, both personal friends of Hart. Hart went on to criticize Flair in his own autobiography, mainly his in-ring talent, (mis)use of ring psychology and what Hart perceived as Flair's unsubtle blading. However, they have since reconciled and are now friends.

=== Shane Douglas ===
Flair also had a long-running feud with Shane Douglas, who would refer to him as "Dick Flair" and accuse him of sabotaging his push in the NWA/WCW after getting a solid push and a rub from his tag team partner Ricky Steamboat. In turn, Flair responded that Douglas was always the guy that would blame his shortcomings on others. He called Douglas out as well, and accused him of steroid abuse during a broadcast of the Internet radio show WCW Live!, in which Flair said that he would meet Douglas any time and anywhere if he would "take the needle out of his ass".

=== Mick Foley ===
Flair has also had problems with Mick Foley. In his 1999 autobiography Have a Nice Day!, Foley said that "Flair was every bit as bad on the booking side of things as he was great on the wrestling side of it". This was in reference to how poorly Foley thought he was booked during his WCW career when Flair was on the booking committee. Flair responded in his autobiography by writing: "I do not care how many thumbtacks Mick Foley has fallen on, how many ladders he's fallen off, how many continents he's supposedly bled on, he will always be known as a glorified stuntman".

They had an altercation in 2004 in Huntsville. In 2006, they worked a program where Flair took part in some of the bloodiest and most violent matches of his career, particularly at the 2006 SummerSlam, in an "I Quit" match which had spots involving barbed wire and thumbtacks—trademark weapons from Foley's days as Cactus Jack. They have since reconciled and are now friends.

=== Hulk Hogan ===
In his book, Flair also touched on some real-life tension between himself and Hulk Hogan, which largely stemmed from an incident that followed the conclusion of a tag team match between Flair and his son David, versus the team of Curt Hennig and Barry Windham, at WCW's Souled Out pay-per-view on January 17, 1999, in Charleston, West Virginia. However, Flair has stated that he and Hogan remained friends despite their differences. Upon Hogan's sudden death from a heart attack at age 71 on July 24, 2025, Flair cried while remembering his friend during an interview with TMZ.com.

=== Bruno Sammartino ===
Flair and wrestler Bruno Sammartino had a real-life disagreement over what reports call "the infamous backstage snub" where Flair claims that Sammartino refused to shake his hand at a live event. While Flair claims Sammartino ignored him due to comments made in his book, stating Sammartino was "a Northeast star who couldn't draw fans outside New York", Sammartino referred to Flair as a "liar" and stating: "No, I don't respect Ric Flair. I don't respect him at all". They reconciled and were friends until Sammartino's death in 2018.

=== Becky Lynch ===
In September 2019, Flair threatened legal action against WWE and filed a trademark for the term "The Man", which was being used as a nickname by heavily promoted wrestler Becky Lynch. The threats of legal action caused a rift between Flair and his daughter Charlotte, who was Lynch's onscreen nemesis at the time. Lynch responded to the actions by asserting that she still liked and respected Flair. Flair transferred the rights to "The Man" nickname and gimmick to WWE in May 2020. The terms of the transfer were undisclosed. Flair began feuding with Lynch in 2021, accusing her of using the term without his explicit permission, but their dispute was resolved when he apologized to her in January 2023.

=== "Plane Ride from Hell" ===
Flair was part of the infamous 2002 "Plane Ride from Hell". Flair was accused of wearing his signature wrestling robe while naked and forcing two female flight attendants to touch his penis; they would later sue the WWE, although the case was ultimately settled out of court. The allegations were discussed on the Canadian documentary series Dark Side of the Ring in 2021 on an episode dedicated to the flight. Flair released a statement after the episode aired denying the allegations. After the allegations went public, Flair was removed from the WWE's signature introduction.

== Championships and accomplishments ==
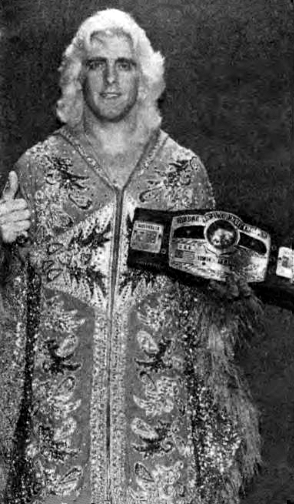
Flair held the NWA World Heavyweight Championship nine times

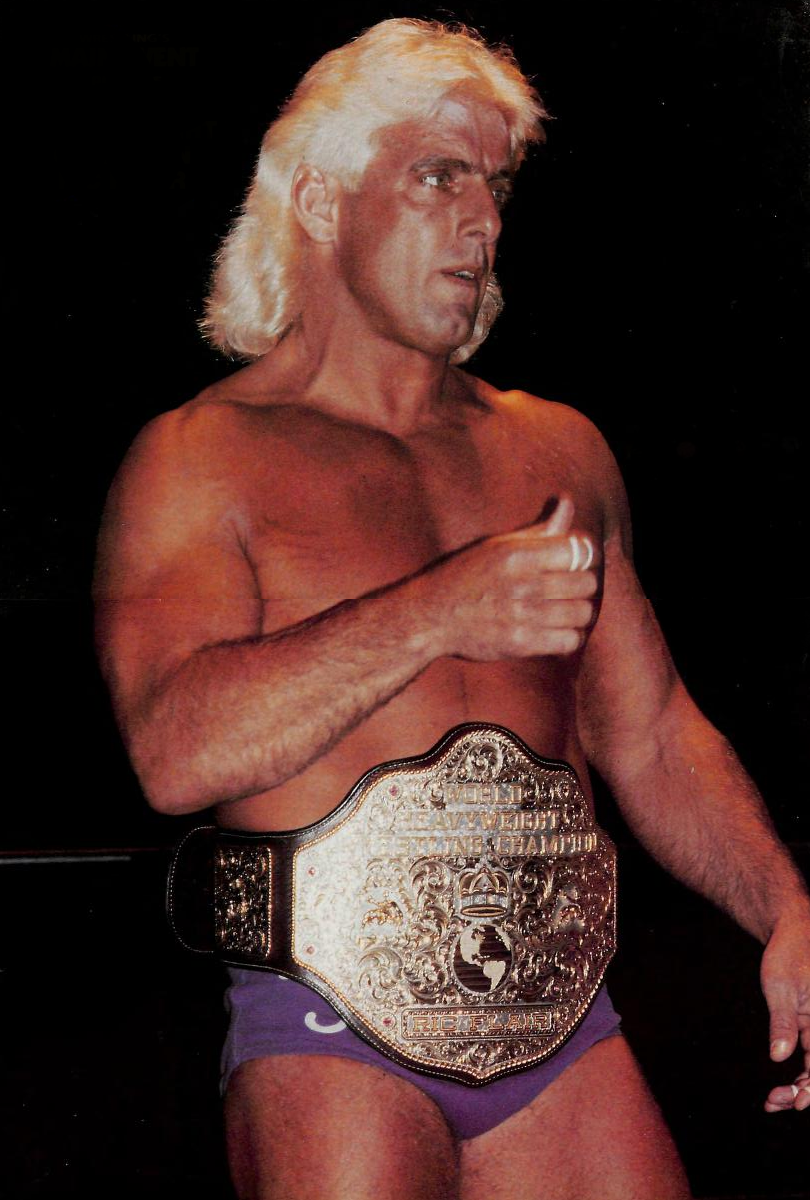
Flair is an eight-time WCW World Heavyweight Champion. Several of those reigns overlapped with his NWA World Heavyweight Championship reigns, as the Big Gold Belt represented both titles.

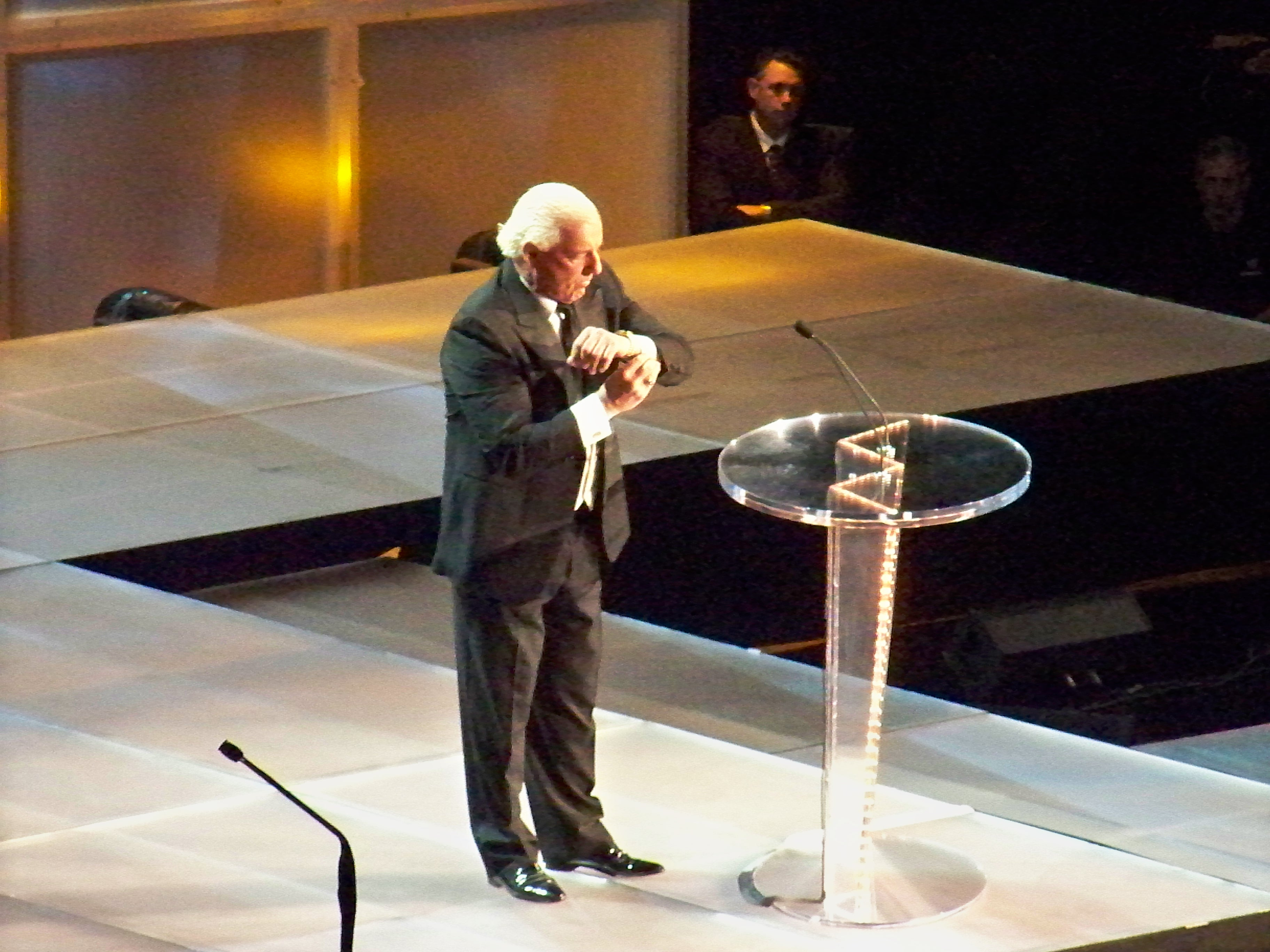
Flair was inducted into the WWE Hall of Fame in 2008 for his singles career

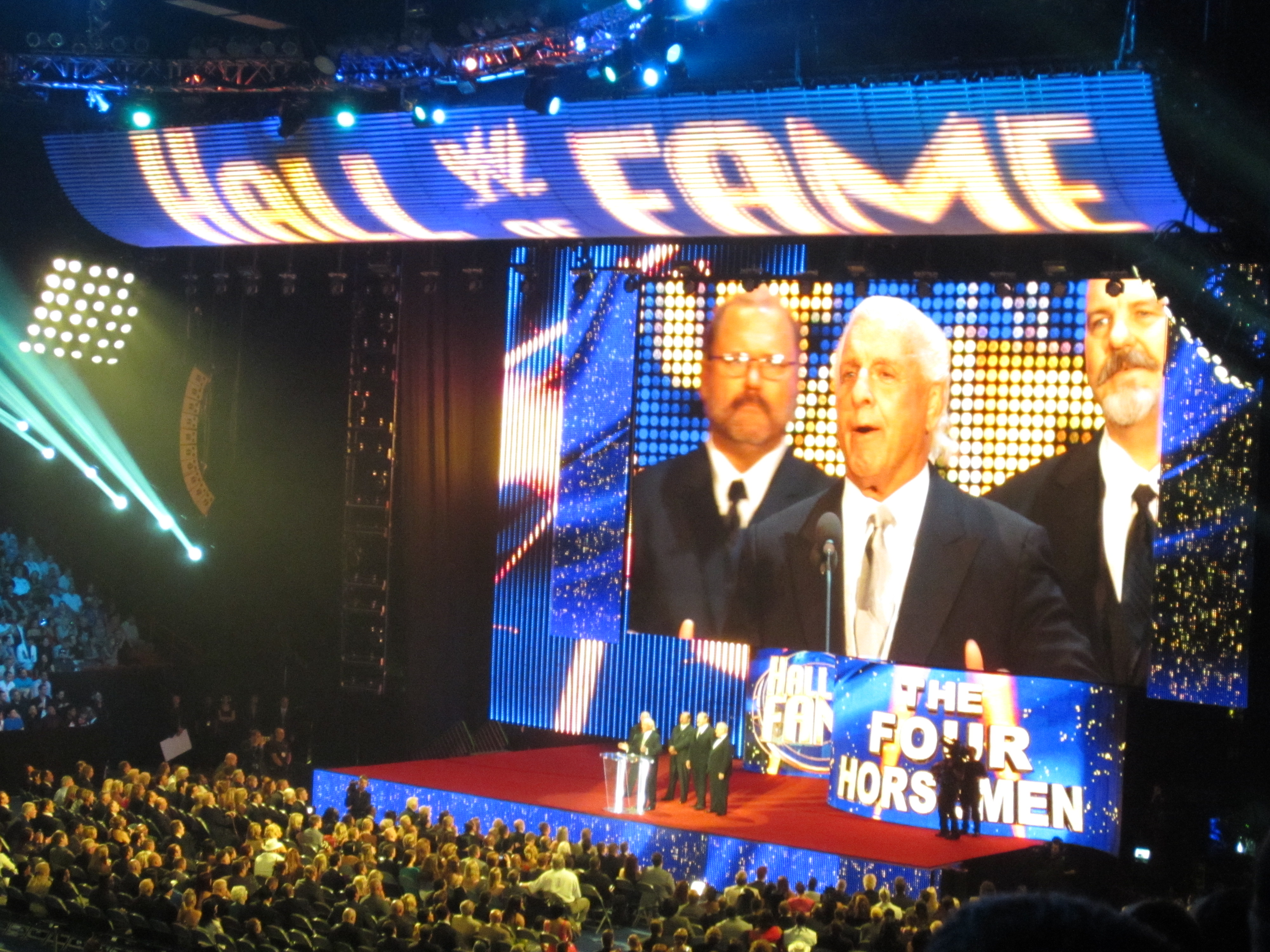
Flair was inducted to the WWE Hall of Fame in 2012 as a member of The Four Horsemen

- The Baltimore Sun
  - Match of the Year (2008) vs. Shawn Michaels at WrestleMania XXIV
- Cauliflower Alley Club
  - Iron Mike Mazurki Award (2026)
- International Professional Wrestling Hall of Fame
  - Class of 2021
- George Tragos/Lou Thesz Professional Wrestling Hall of Fame
  - Class of 2013
- Jim Crockett Promotions / World Championship Wrestling
  - WCW World Heavyweight Championship (8 times)
  - WCW International World Heavyweight Championship (2 times)
  - NWA United States Heavyweight Championship (Mid Atlantic version) / WCW United States Heavyweight Championship (6 times) (Note: Flair did win the Mid-Atlantic version of the NWA United States Heavyweight Championship six times and the six reigns were recognized even after World Championship Wrestling (WCW) took control over the championship and renamed it the WCW United States Heavyweight Championship in 1991. After WCW's purchase by WWE, the lineage of the championships were kept in the WWE United States Championship. WWE.com has published contradictory information on Flair's reigns – recognizing five reigns in one article, but describing him as a six-time champion in another article.)
  - NWA World Tag Team Championship (Mid-Atlantic version) (3 times) – with Greg Valentine (2) and Blackjack Mulligan (1)
  - NWA Mid-Atlantic Heavyweight Championship (3 times)
  - NWA Mid-Atlantic Tag Team Championship (3 times) – with Rip Hawk (1), Greg Valentine (1), and Big John Studd (1)
  - NWA Television Championship (Mid Atlantic version) (2 times)
  - WCW Triple Crown Champion
- National Wrestling Alliance
  - NWA World Heavyweight Championship (9 times)
  - NWA Hall of Fame (class of 2008)
- Pro Wrestling Illustrated
  - PWI Feud of the Year (1987) The Four Horsemen vs. The Super Powers and the Road Warriors
  - Feud of the Year (1988, 1990) vs. Lex Luger
  - Feud of the Year (1989) vs. Terry Funk
  - PWI Inspirational Wrestler of the Year (2008)
  - PWI Match of the Year (1983) vs. Harley Race (June 10)
  - Match of the Year (1984) vs. Kerry Von Erich at 1st Von Erich Memorial Parade of Champions
  - Match of the Year (1986) vs. Dusty Rhodes at The Great American Bash in a steel cage match
  - Match of the Year (1989) vs. Ricky Steamboat at WrestleWar '89: Music City Showdown
  - Match of the Year (2008) vs. Shawn Michaels at WrestleMania XXIV
  - Match of the Decade (2000–2009) vs. Shawn Michaels at WrestleMania XXIV
  - PWI Most Hated Wrestler of the Year (1978, 1987)
  - PWI Rookie of the Year (1975)
  - PWI Stanley Weston Award (2008)
  - PWI Wrestler of the Year (1981, 1984–1986, 1989, 1992)
  - PWI Wrestler of the Decade (1980s)
  - Ranked no. 3 of the top 500 wrestlers in the PWI 500 in 1991, 1992, and 1994
  - Ranked no. 2 of the top 500 singles wrestlers of the PWI Years in 2003
- Professional Wrestling Hall of Fame and Museum
  - Class of 2006
- St. Louis Wrestling Club
  - NWA Missouri Heavyweight Championship (1 time)
- St. Louis Wrestling Hall of Fame
  - Class of 2007
- World Wrestling Federation / World Wrestling Entertainment / WWE
  - WWF Championship (2 times)
  - WWE Intercontinental Championship (1 time)
  - World Tag Team Championship (3 times) – with Batista (2) and Roddy Piper (1)
  - Royal Rumble (1992)
  - WWF Triple Crown Champion
  - Slammy Award for Match of the Year (2008) vs. Shawn Michaels at WrestleMania XXIV
  - WWE Hall of Fame (2 times)
    - Class of 2008 - individually
    - Class of 2012 - as a member of The Four Horsemen
  - WWE Bronze Statue (2017)
- Wrestling Observer Newsletter
  - Best Heel (1990)
  - Best Interviews (1991, 1992, 1994)
  - Hardest Worker (1982, 1984–1988)
  - Feud of the Year (1989) vs. Terry Funk
  - Match of the Year (1983) vs. Harley Race in a steel cage match at Starrcade
  - Match of the Year (1986) vs. Barry Windham at Battle of the Belts II on February 14
  - Match of the Year (1988) vs. Sting at Clash of the Champions I
  - Match of the Year (1989) vs. Ricky Steamboat at Clash of the Champions VI: Ragin' Cajun
  - Most Charismatic (1980, 1982–1984, 1993)
  - Most Outstanding (1986, 1987, 1989)
  - Readers' Favorite Wrestler (1984–1993, 1996)
  - Worst Feud of the Year (1990) vs. The Junkyard Dog
  - Worst Worked Match of the Year (1996) with Arn Anderson, Meng, The Barbarian, Lex Luger, Kevin Sullivan, Z-Gangsta, and The Ultimate Solution vs. Hulk Hogan and Randy Savage in a Towers of Doom match at Uncensored
  - Wrestler of the Year (1982–1986, 1989, 1990, 1992)
  - Most Disgusting Promotional Tactic (1994) Retirement angle
  - Wrestling Observer Newsletter Hall of Fame (Class of 1996)
