= King Booker's Court =

Professional wrestling stable

Stable
- Members: King Booker (leader); Queen Sharmell (valet); Sir Finlay; Sir William Regal; Little Bastard (manager)
- Name(s): The King's Court; King Booker's Court
- Billed heights: King Booker: 6 ft 3 in (1.91 m); Finlay: 5 ft 10 in (1.78 m); William Regal: 6 ft 2 in (1.88 m)
- Combined billed weight: 736 lb (334 kg)
- Debut: May 26, 2006
- Disbanded: April 6, 2007
- Years active: 2006–2007

King Booker's Court was a villainous professional wrestling stable in World Wrestling Entertainment (WWE) on its SmackDown! brand, active from May 26, 2006 to April 6, 2007. It was formed shortly after Booker T (who would become known as King Booker) won the King of the Ring tournament in mid-2006. King Booker would dub his wife Queen Sharmell and was joined by WWE Superstars from the United Kingdom: William Regal of England (renamed Sir William Regal) and Finlay of Northern Ireland (renamed Sir Finlay). Among the members of the Court, Booker, Regal and Finlay remain employed with the WWE as of 2026, while Sharmell joined the Hall of Fame Class of 2022.

== History ==
=== SmackDown (2006–2007) ===
Prior to Booker T becoming King Booker, he would often enlist the aid of Finlay to do his dirty work for him.

The King's Court was unofficially founded on the May 26, 2006 episode of SmackDown!, when King Booker had his coronation ceremony, celebrating his King of the Ring tournament final victory at Judgment Day over Bobby Lashley. The ceremony was led by William Regal, playing the role of a town crier and repeatedly shouting "All hail King Booker!" as King Booker walked to the ring. Sharmell was anointed by King Booker as his Queen, and Finlay joined the group to help King Booker continue to feud with Lashley.

King Booker would soon end his feud with Lashley after losing to him in a steel cage match for Lashley's WWE United States Championship. He then became the number one contender for Rey Mysterio's World Championship after winning a battle royal. Finlay would go on to defeat Lashley during this time to take Lashley's United States Championship.

At The Great American Bash pay-per-view, King Booker became the World Heavyweight Champion, defeating Rey Mysterio with help from the heel turn of Chavo Guerrero. The Great American Bash also saw Finlay take on Regal in a one-on-one match for the United States Championship with Finlay coming out victorious with help from the Little Bastard. These events repeated themselves via rematches on the July 28 episode of SmackDown!, at first making it unclear whether Regal or Finlay had turned face, or whether they would even remain in the King's Court. At SummerSlam, King Booker would lose to Batista by disqualification, thus retaining the title and Finlay and William Regal, along with Mr. Kennedy (who later defeated Finlay for the United States Championship), the Spirit Squad and Big Show attacked D-Generation X (DX) during their match against Vince and Shane McMahon.

On the August 25 episode of SmackDown!, the two members were knighted together – thus renaming them as Sir William Regal and Sir Finlay, as well as signaling the official founding of the King's Court – before teaming up with their King in a 3-on-2 handicap match against Lashley and Batista later that night, which they lost.

King Booker would later defeat Batista thanks to inference by Sir Finlay, who would continue to attack and bloody him afterward, igniting a feud between the two. The Court's issues with Bobby Lashley continued as he was set to take on King Booker at No Mercy for the World Heavyweight Championship, however the SmackDown! General Manager Theodore Long announced the match to be a fatal four-way match that also involved Sir Finlay and Batista.

On the October 6 edition of SmackDown!, King Booker and Lashley were each able to pick the other's opponent for that night. King Booker had to fight Sir Finlay so he asked Sir Finlay to be a good knight and lay down, but Sir Finlay said that he never lays down for anybody. They went on to have the match, in which Sir Finlay picked up the victory. Afterwards, they interfered in the Lashley vs. Batista match (Batista being the "poison" that King Booker picked). Following this, Theodore Long announced the previously mentioned four-way at No Mercy, and then booked Batista and Lashley vs. Sir Finlay and King Booker. Sir Finlay and King Booker, however, did not get along.

At No Mercy, King Booker retained his title in the fatal-four-way match when he pinned Finlay after a Batista Bomb from Batista. Prior to the match, after failing at his task to get Finlay to be allies with Booker, King Booker called Regal pathetic and slapped him in the face. Regal could have no more so he punched Booker and walked away.

After this incident, the Court disbanded with Regal dropping the 'Sir' part of his name and going into the tag team division with partner Dave Taylor and Finlay taking on King Booker and Batista in singles matches (with Booker losing the World Heavyweight Championship to Batista at Survivor Series).

The Court returned on the December 8 edition of SmackDown! (without Regal) when they attacked Batista in his match with Finlay with a chair and a shillelagh, leading to a tag team match at Armageddon with Batista choosing a mystery partner which turned out to be WWE Champion John Cena. Batista and Cena would win the match. Finlay and King Booker would reunite in various tag team matches on SmackDown! as temporary allies since then.

The April 6 episode of SmackDown! seemed to be the end of the Court. King Booker attempted to take revenge on Matt Hardy for trying to set up Sharmell for a twist of fate in the Money in the Bank match at WrestleMania 23 (a match he lost). He lost the match to Hardy, however, and Sharmell berated him, declared him to be a disappointment and slapped him. King Booker tried to impress her by attacking The Undertaker, but got a Tombstone Piledriver on the announce table. It was announced on WWE's official website that he suffered a sprain and strained contusion of the neck and would also be treated for his previous injuries of chronic knee pain, where he had a meniscus tear, and a chronic elbow strain and he would be out for several months. The Court would then disband for the final time. During the 2007 WWE draft, King Booker and Sharmell were drafted to the Raw brand and Regal also returned to Raw in a supplemental draft from SmackDown!, becoming the Raw General Manager in August. On October 16, 2007, it was officially announced on WWE's official website that Booker and Sharmell would be released from their contracts effective October 27, thus completely destroying any possibility of a reunion. However, Booker T returned to the WWE minus Sharmell in January 2011 in various roles since then.

=== Sporadic appearances ===
On April 2, 2022, Booker T inducted Sharmell into the WWE Hall of Fame Class of 2022, briefly reuniting the couple of the Court.

The couple of the Court would briefly reunite again during Night 2 of the 2023 WWE Draft, with Booker selecting the draft picks for Raw and Sharmell selecting draft picks for SmackDown, both on the second round of the draft.

== Legacy ==
During the March 10 episode of NXT Finlay and Regal appeared on the stage helping Regal's son Charlie Dempsey defeating Taivon Heights after turning on him, thus joining the Birthright faction led by Lexis King and Finlay's son, Uriah Connors.

== Members ==
*	Founding member(s)
L	Leader
V/M	Valet/manager

Member		Joined	Left
King Booker	L	May 26, 2006 *	April 6, 2007
Queen Sharmell	V	May 26, 2006 *	April 6, 2007
Sir William Regal		May 26, 2006 *	October 8, 2006
Sir Finlay		August 25, 2006	October 6, 2006
Little Bastard	M	August 25, 2006	October 6, 2006

== Championships and accomplishments ==
- World Wrestling Entertainment
  - World Heavyweight Championship (1 time) – King Booker
  - WWE United States Championship (1 time) – Finlay
  - King of the Ring (2006) – King Booker
