= Christopher Peña =

Christopher Peña may refer to:

- Christopher Martin Peña (born 1986), Mexican American boxer
- Christopher Oscar Peña, playwright, screenwriter, actor and educator
