= JTG =

Professional wrestler

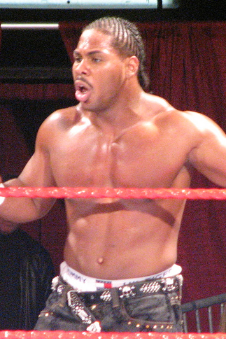
- JTG in 2009

Personal information
- Born: Jayson Anthony Paul; December 10, 1984 (age 41) Brooklyn, New York, U.S.

Professional wrestling career
- Ring name(s): Jay-TG; JTG; The Neighborhoodie
- Billed height: 6 ft 2 in (1.88 m)
- Billed weight: 232 lb (105 kg)
- Billed from: Brooklyn, New York
- Trained by: Ohio Valley Wrestling
- Debut: 2002

Jayson Anthony Paul (born December 10, 1984) is an American professional wrestler best known for his time in WWE under the ring name JTG.

Paul began his professional wrestling career in 2006 with World Wrestling Entertainment (WWE), being assigned to their developmental territory Ohio Valley Wrestling (OVW), where he was a two-time OVW Southern Tag Team Champion (with Shad Gaspard, as part of Cryme Tyme). In 2006, Cryme Tyme was promoted to WWE's main roster, before both JTG and Gaspard were released from the company the following year. They both returned to the company in 2008, and later split up and feuded with each other until Gaspard's release in 2010.

Later that year, JTG was assigned to NXT, where he was announced as one of the Pros for NXT Redemption, mentoring Jacob Novak. He eventually turned heel and feuded with Vladimir Kozlov's rookie Conor O'Brian and Kozlov himself. He additionally made appearances on SmackDown and Superstars. From late 2012 to 2013, JTG was relegated to jobber status and continued to compete until his release in 2014.

== Early life ==
Jayson Anthony Paul was born on December 10, 1984, in Brooklyn, New York City, New York. Paul's mother is of Tobagonian descent. He attended John Dewey High School in Brooklyn, where he participated in acting and drama classes.

== Professional wrestling career ==
=== World Wrestling Entertainment (2006–2007) ===
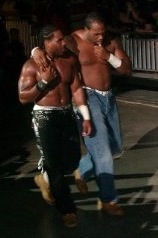
Cryme Tyme – JTG (left) and Shad Gaspard at a house show

Paul began his career in 2006, working in the World Wrestling Entertainment (WWE) developmental territory Ohio Valley Wrestling (OVW) under the ring name The Neighborhoodie. While there, he was placed into a tag team with Shad Gaspard. They held the OVW Southern Tag Team Championship on two occasions.

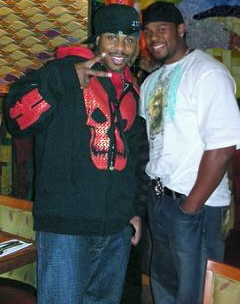
Cryme Tyme at a WWE event in Ohio

In 2006, the tag team was promoted from OVW to the Raw brand under the name "Cryme Tyme", with Paul changing his name to JTG. On September 4, 2006, a series of vignettes began airing on Raw, hyping the debut of Cryme Tyme. On the October 16, 2006 episode of Raw, Cryme Tyme debuted and defeated two members of the then named World Tag Team Champions, The Spirit Squad (Mikey and Johnny), in a non-title match. In November 2006, at the Cyber Sunday pay-per-view, Cryme Tyme defeated Lance Cade and Trevor Murdoch, Charlie Haas, Viscera, and The Highlanders in a Texas tornado tag team match (as voted by the fans). As part of their gimmick, Cryme Tyme regularly stole items belonging to other wrestlers and on-air personalities, and sold them to fans. They were also selling false entry numbers at the Royal Rumble. A few months later at the New Year's Revolution pay-per-view, Cryme Tyme won a tag team turmoil match against The Highlanders, World's Greatest Tag Team, Cade and Murdoch, and "Hacksaw" Jim Duggan and Super Crazy, earning them a shot at the World Tag Team Championships. They then competed mainly on Heat for the next few months, although they made a backstage appearance at WrestleMania 23. They also took part in the tag team battle royal on April 2.

After Mr. McMahon's "death", Cryme Tyme plugged some merchandise and auctions in memory of him. On the June 29, 2007 episode of SmackDown, Cryme Tyme was defeated by Deuce 'n Domino (with Cherry) in an inter-brand match tag team match. While Deuce, Domino and Cherry celebrated their victory, Cryme Tyme appeared on the titantron and, in storyline, stole their car, taking it to Brisco Brothers Auto to sell it for parts chanting their signature catchphrase, "Money money, yeah, yeah". On July 21, 2007, Cryme Tyme defeated The James Boys to win the OVW Southern Tag Team Championship for the second time. On August 13, 2007, Cryme Tyme returned to their hometown of New York City on an episode of Raw from Madison Square Garden, losing to then-World Tag Team Champions Lance Cade and Trevor Murdoch in a non-title match by disqualification when Shad used a chair on Murdoch. On the August 20, 2007 episode of Raw, Cryme Tyme stole Murdoch's hat and sold it to a fan, and the following week, stole Cade's and gave it away to a fan. In the middle of this feud, on September 2, 2007, both Paul and Gaspard were released from WWE.

=== Independent circuit (2007–2008) ===
Paul, along with Gaspard wrestled at the Jersey All Pro Wrestling 10th Anniversary Show on October 27, 2007. Wrestling as Crime Time, they defeated The Dirty Rotten Scoundrelz. Paul appeared in Derby City Wrestling (DCW) at their end of year show. He was then involved in a feud with The Mobile Homers in DCW.

=== Return to WWE ===
==== Cryme Tyme reunion (2008–2010) ====
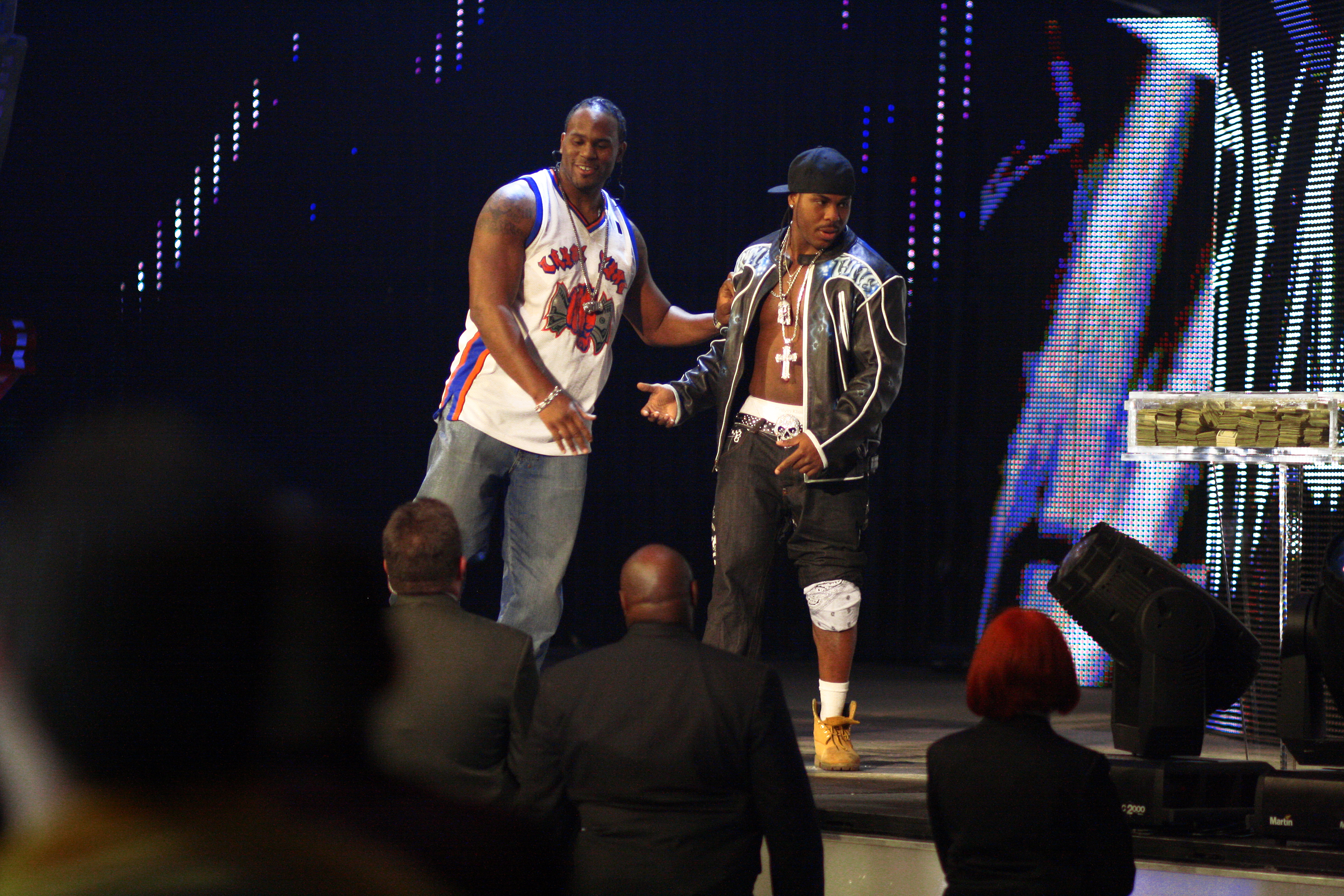
Cryme Tyme in June 2008

Cryme Tyme returned to WWE on the March 31, 2008 episode of Raw, where they defeated Lance Cade and Trevor Murdoch in their first televised match in nearly six months. Cryme Tyme began working with John Cena on the June 30 episode of Raw when they helped him interfere during John "Bradshaw" Layfield's match. The following week, they again appeared together in a backstage segment when they vandalised JBL's limo. After a house show match, Cena announced they had created a faction called CTC, "Cryme Tyme Cenation". Separately, Cryme Tyme started a feud with then World Tag Team Champions Ted DiBiase and Cody Rhodes, stealing their championship belts for a time, then losing a title match to them at Unforgiven. JTG entered early into the Royal Rumble match at the 2009 Royal Rumble pay-per-view in January, after cheating to get a spot instead of Shad. JTG lasted nearly 12 minutes before he was eliminated by The Undertaker. On the January 26 episode of Raw, JTG and Shad attempted to win the World Tag Team Championship from John Morrison and the Miz, but were unsuccessful.

On April 15, 2009, Cryme Tyme were drafted to the SmackDown brand as part of the 2009 supplemental draft. They earned a Unified WWE Tag Team Championship match against Jeri-Show (Chris Jericho and Big Show) for SummerSlam after defeating The Hart Dynasty on the July 31 episode of SmackDown. On the August 7 episode of SmackDown, JTG pinned Jericho in a major upset, however at SummerSlam they lost the match after Show hit JTG in the face and Jericho pinned him. At the Royal Rumble, JTG entered his second royal rumble match but only lasted 25 seconds getting eliminated by CM Punk. At WrestleMania XXVI, Cryme Tyme competed in the dark match battle royal, but neither won the match.

On the April 2, 2010 episode of SmackDown, Cryme Tyme was quickly defeated by John Morrison and R-Truth. The loss of the match prompted Gaspard to attack JTG, breaking up the team. Their feud culminated with a strap match at Extreme Rules which JTG won. After JTG won against Caylen Croft, Gaspard immediately attacked him unsuccessfully. Shad won a rematch on the May 6 episode of Superstars, but their feud came to an end when Gaspard was sent to Florida Championship Wrestling (FCW).

==== Singles competition (2010–2014) ====
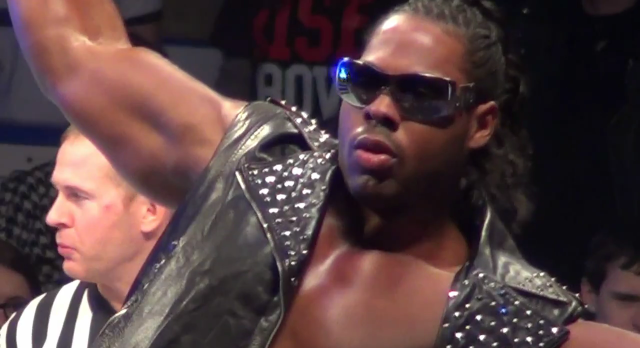
JTG in 2012

Also after the split up of Cryme Tyme in 2010 JTG went on to compete in singles and in tag team action strictly on the SmackDown roster wrestling against talent such as Mike Knox, Chavo Guerrero, Jack Swagger, CM Punk, Vance Archer, and even teaming with other talent such as MVP, Chris Masters, and Trent Barreta in tag team action and in six man tag team action since the team split up.

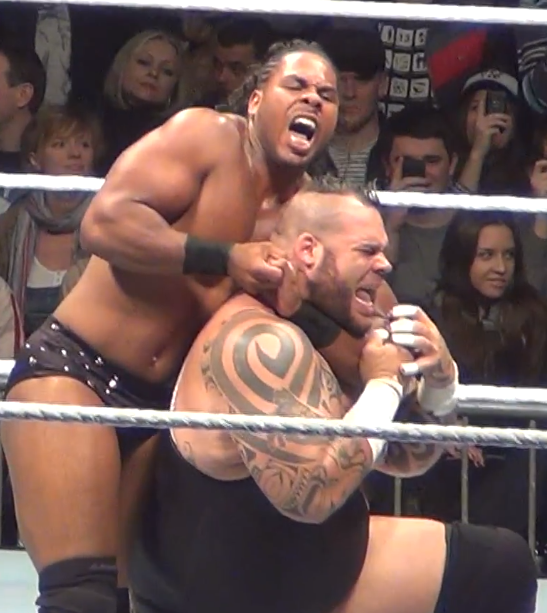
JTG in a match with Brodus Clay in 2012

JTG was announced to be one of the Pros for NXT Redemption, mentoring Jacob Novak. On the May 3, 2011 episode of NXT, he started his feud with William Regal when Regal called him a "muppet" while Novak was calling Regal out to a match, turning him heel. Two weeks later, Novak was on eliminated, being the first to no longer be part of the show. In the 2011 WWE draft, JTG was drafted to the Raw brand in the supplemental draft via WWE.com on April 26, 2011.

On the May 24 episode of NXT, JTG had a feud with Vladimir Kozlov's rookie Conor O'Brian after he was pinned by O'Brian in a singles match. Afterwards JTG attacked O'Brian until Kozlov made a save and attacked JTG. He wrestled on the May 26 episode of Superstars as a face in a losing effort against Curt Hawkins. He officially cemented his status as a heel on the June 7 episode of NXT Redemption when he attacked Yoshi Tatsu on JTG's in ring segment "Straight Outta Brooklyn". As he was going backstage, Matt Striker came out and announced JTG would face Tatsu in a match, which JTG lost. On the July 19 and August 2 episodes of NXT Redemption, Kozlov started a feud with JTG beating him two times in a row with Kozlov also dressed like JTG in the second match. The feud ended when Kozlov was released by WWE on August 5, 2011. JTG scored his first win in months on the August 5 episode of SmackDown teaming with David Otunga and Michael McGillicutty to defeat The Usos and Trent Barreta. JTG gained a girlfriend and manager in Tamina in November 2011, leading to a feud with The Usos, whom Tamina had formerly managed; JTG continually found himself losing to The Usos.

Alicia Fox then approached JTG in May 2012 and offered to give him a makeover, which JTG accepted. On the May 9 episode of NXT Redemption, JTG debuted a new look and defeated Yoshi Tatsu, which was his first and only win in 2012, as JTG soon reverted to losing matches for the rest of 2012 and 2013, including his final match, which was a loss to Santino Marella on the September 20, 2013 episode of Superstars. After not appearing on WWE television in 2014, JTG was released on June 12.

==== One night return (2022) ====
On April 1, 2022, JTG, in his first WWE appearance in eight years, appeared with Shad Gaspard's wife and son in the 2022 WWE Hall of Fame ceremony, awarding the Warrior award to Gaspard.

=== Return to the independent circuit (2014–present) ===
==== Cryme Tyme second reunion (2014–2020) ====
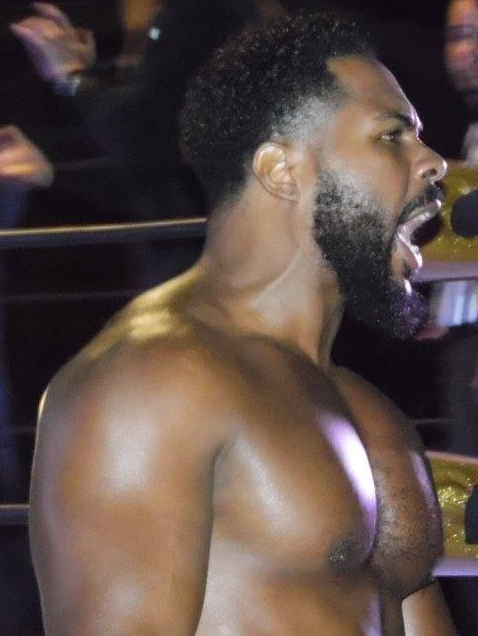
JTG in 2016

In June 2014, JTG and tag team partner Shad Gaspard began taking bookings as Crime Time, changing the spelling of their name in order to avoid a lawsuit from WWE. On August 23, 2014, for Warriors of Wrestling, Crime Time and The Blue Meanie were defeated by Chachi, Verna and J-George. This was JTG's first match since leaving WWE. He appeared at wrestling events by himself or with Gaspard as part of Crime Time in the United States, Canada, and the United Kingdom. In 2017, he wrestled for Joey Ryan's California Bar Wrestling promotion in matches alone and alongside Gaspard. In 2019, he wrestled a tag match with Shad at a Game Changer Wrestling/Suburban Fight Pro event, and in a battle royal at Joey Janela's Spring Break 3.

On February 15, 2020, Crime Time appeared at former WWE wrestler Santino Marella's Battle Arts promotion in Mississauga, Ontario, Canada, which would be their final match together as following scheduled events were cancelled due to the COVID-19 pandemic. Gaspard died three months later on May 17, disbanding the tag team.

==== Singles competition (2020–present) ====
Three months after Gaspard's death, JTG made his first wrestling appearance at VxS Wrestling on August 16, 2020, losing to Brian Cage. He also appeared at Brii Combination Wrestling on September 5 in Atlantic City, New Jersey. On October 9, JTG defeated Trey Miguel at Game Changer Wrestling's For The Culture event, and also participated in a Battle Royal at the promotion's Spring Break 4 event the following day, which was broadcast on FITE TV. On November 6, JTG won the VIP Wrestling Heavyweight Championship in Haltom City, Texas, becoming his first solo championship after defeating Gino, Shane Taylor, and Will Allday. He reappeared at the wrestling promotion on January 29, 2021, after issuing an open challenge to take his championship title, which Alex Hammerstone accepted but lost. He returned to the promotion again on March 26, defeating Carlito, and has continued to make appearances with the promotion, with his most recent being on March 6, 2022, in a match against Shane Taylor.

In February 2021, he appeared at Florida-based wrestling promotions and returned to VxS Wrestling in New Jersey, defeating Mance Warner. On April 9, he appeared at VxS Wrestling's Lucid Dreams show in Tampa, Florida that was broadcast on FITE TV in a match against Dr. Cube. After being attacked by Dr. Cube and his entourage, he was saved by Big Cass and won the match. On October 22, he made his PCW Ultra debut in Wilmington, California, where he was defeated by Steve Madison. On October 24, he won the Waco Association Wrestling Championship in Waco, Texas after defeating Juventud Guerrera.

On March 12, 2022, JTG appeared on Deadlock Pro-Wrestling's DPW Fire attempting to win the DPW Worlds Championship in Jacksonville, North Carolina, though was defeated by then current champion Bojack. On February 3, 2023, he made his House of Glory debut at their The Beginning show in an attempt to earn the Heavyweight Championship title from Jacob Fatu, though lost the match. He also attempted to earn the Super Indy title from Cole Karter at International Wrestling Cartel's Twenty Two Show the following month, though also lost. He lost to former WWE wrestler Ken Anderson (wrestler) (Mr. Kennedy) at Midwest All-Star Wrestling in St. Paul, Minnesota on July 15, 2023.

On April 20, 2024, JTG had a career highlight when he won the Shad Gaspard Memorial Cup in a one-day tournament in Jacksonville, Florida. He defeated Thom Latimer in the first round by count-out and defeated Kenny King (wrestler) in the Semis. In the Finals he defeated Prince Agballah. At the end of 2024, JTG signed with All Caribbean Wrestling and made two appearances with the promotion in June 2025, with a winning match against Alex Arsenal and a time limit draw with WWE ID prospect It's Gal.

=== National Wrestling Alliance (2021–2022) ===
On June 6, JTG made his National Wrestling Alliance debut at their When Our Shadows Fall pay-per-view event, defeating Fred Rosser. A month later on July 6, he was defeated by Chris Adonis in an attempt to earn his NWA National Championship title. In December of that year, he formed a tag team with Dirty Dango under the name "Dirty Sexy Boys."

== Other activities and media ==
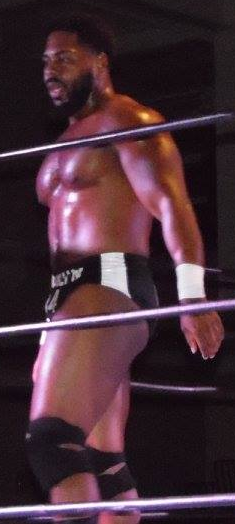
JTG in 2016

JTG published his first book Damn! Why Did I Write This Book? in May 2015, followed by its sequel Damn! Why Did I Write This Book Too? How to Play the Game the following year. He published his third book and first fitness e-book, The Newbies Guide To Big Biceps: So Easy To Follow A Child Could Do It!, in December 2020.

As an actor, JTG made his film debut in Bad Night and appeared in The Last Sharknado: It's About Time. In 2017, he appeared on the song "Team Asoka" with The Asoka alongside wrestlers John Morrison and Rocky Romero.

In 2018, JTG founded a beard and body care line named Sexy As Hell Beard Care. The following year, he created an app called Earsaye, which creates audio memes.

JTG has appeared in the video games as a playable character in WWE SmackDown vs. Raw 2008, WWE SmackDown vs. Raw 2009, WWE SmackDown vs. Raw 2010, and WWE SmackDown vs. Raw 2011.

=== Filmography ===
Movies & TV
Year	Title	Role	Notes
2011	Silent Library	Himself	Season 4, Episode 3
2014	We The Economy	Himself	"GDP Smackdown" (Short film)
2015	Bad Night	Knuckles	
2015	Wrestling Isn't Wrestling	Theater Audience Member	Short film
2017	Campus Law	Dynamite Joe	"Quill Plus" (Season 1, Episode 3)
2018	Coach's Wrestling Class	Himself	Short film
2018	The Last Sharknado: It's About Time	Joe Louis	Television film
2023	I Think You Should Leave with Tim Robinson	Himself	"So Now Every Time I'm About to Do Something I Really Want to Do, I Ask Myself, 'Wait A Minute, What Is This?'" (Season 3, Episode 4)

Video Game
Year	Title
2008	WWE SmackDown vs. Raw 2008
2009	WWE SmackDown vs. Raw 2009
2010	WWE SmackDown vs. Raw 2010
2011	WWE SmackDown vs. Raw 2011

=== Bibliography ===
- Damn! Why Did I Write This Book?. CreateSpace Independent Publishing. 2015. ISBN 978-1512286113.
- Damn! Why Did I Write This Book Too? How to Play the Game. CreateSpace Independent Publishing. 2016. ISBN 978-1530743445.
- The Newbies Guide To Big Biceps: So Easy To Follow A Child Could Do It!. 2020.

== Championships and accomplishments ==
- NWA Wildside

- NWA Wildside Tag Team Championship (1 time) – with Shad Gaspard

- Fighting Evolution Wrestling
  - FEW Tag Team Championship (1 time) – with Shad Gaspard
- Hoodslam
  - Best Athlete In The East Bay Championship (1 time)
- Love-Alive Charity
  - Shad Gaspard Memorial Cup (2024)
- Ohio Valley Wrestling
  - OVW Southern Tag Team Championship (2 times) – with Shad Gaspard
- Pro Wrestling Illustrated
  - Ranked No. 84 of the top 500 singles wrestlers in the PWI 500 in 2010
- Superstars of Wrestling Federation
  - SWF Tag Team Championship (1 time) – with Shad Gaspard
- VIP Wrestling
  - VIP Tag Team Championship (1 time) – with Shad Gaspard
  - VIP Heavyweight Championship (1 time)
- Waco Association of Wrestling
  - WAW Lonestar Championship (1 time)
- World Wrestling Alliance
  - WWA Tag Team Championship (1 time) - with Shad Gaspard
