= My First Miracle =

- Directed by: Rudy Luna
- Written by: Rudy Luna
- Produced by: Brenton Earley; Jordan Yale Levine; Chyna “Pfeva” Foster; Kenny Lofton; Rudy Luna; Amanda Ramirez
- Starring: Jason London; Sean Patrick Flanery; Quinton Aaron; Valerie Cruz; Shad Gaspard
- Cinematography: Alan McIntyre Smith
- Edited by: Rudy Luna
- Release date: December 4, 2015
- Country: United States
- Language: English

My First Miracle is a 2015 American Christian dramedy film directed by Rudy Luna and starring Jason London, Sean Patrick Flanery, Quinton Aaron and Valerie Cruz. Kenny Lofton, Chyna Pfeva Foster, Amanda Ramirez served as executive producers of the film.

== Cast ==
- Jason London as Father Lawrence
- Sean Patrick Flanery as Charlie
- Quinton Aaron as Brandon
- Shad Gaspard as Jack
- Matthew Rauch as Mark
- Valerie Cruz as Heidi
- Katya Martín as Angelica
- Chyna Pfeva Foster as Mary
