= Sharmell =

American professional wrestler (born 1970)

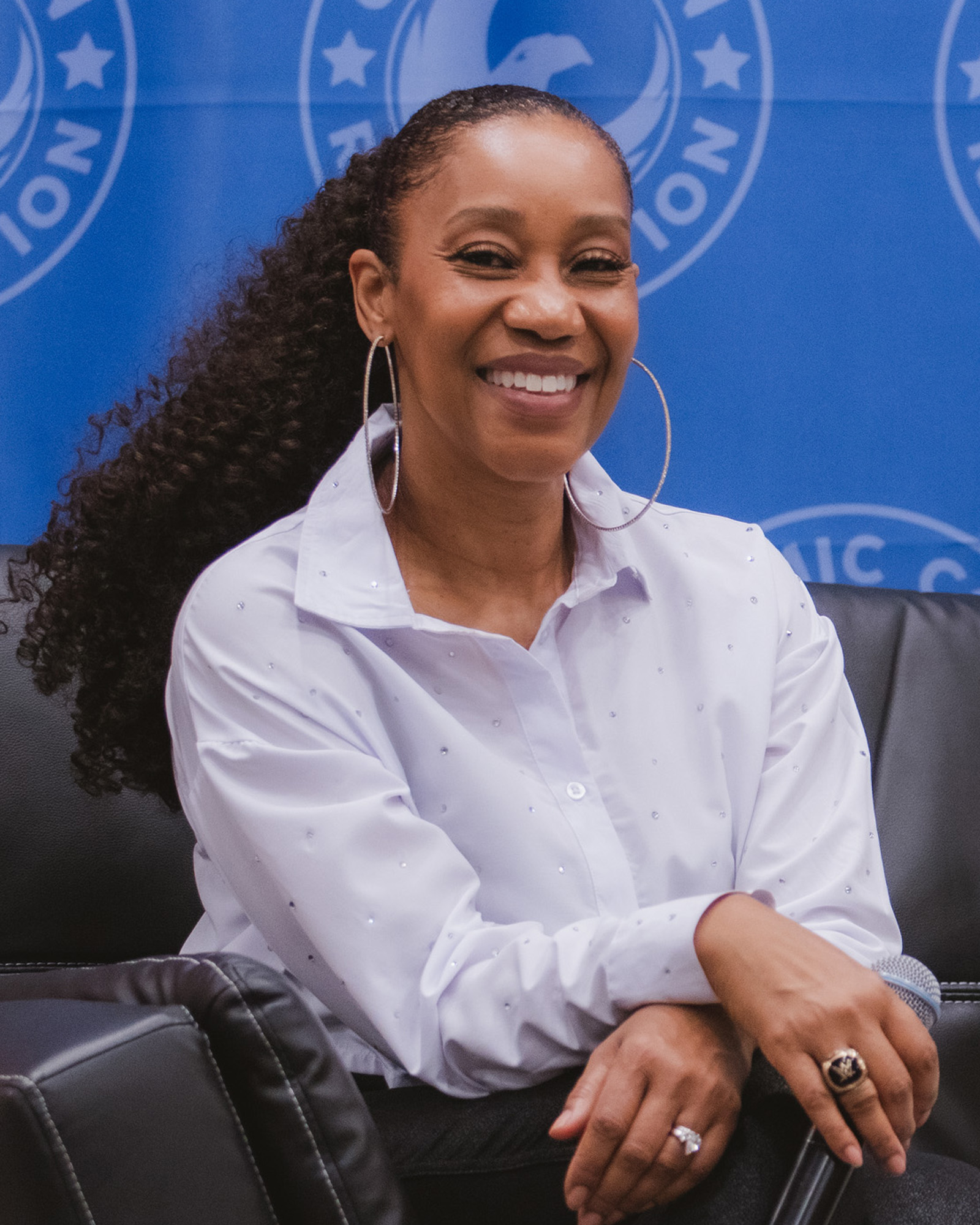
- Sharmell in 2025

Personal information
- Born: Sharmell Sullivan; November 2, 1970 (age 55) Gary, Indiana, U.S.
- Education: Spelman College
- Spouse: Booker T (m. 2005)
- Children: 2

Professional wrestling career
- Ring name(s): Paisley; Queen Sharmell; Sharmell; Sister Sharmell; Storm
- Billed height: 5 ft 7 in (1.70 m)
- Billed weight: 125 lb (57 kg; 8.9 st)
- Billed from: Houston, Texas
- Trained by: WCW Power Plant; Ohio Valley Wrestling; Fit Finlay; Molly Holly
- Debut: December 1998
- Retired: 2023

Sharmell Sullivan-Huffman (born November 2, 1970) is an American beauty queen, dancer, professional wrestler and professional wrestling valet. She is best known for her time with World Wrestling Entertainment (WWE) under the ring name Queen Sharmell alongside her husband Booker T. In 2022 Sullivan was inducted in to the WWE Hall of Fame. She was also the winner of the Miss Black America pageant in 1991.

== Early life ==
Sullivan was valedictorian of Roosevelt High School in Gary, Indiana in 1988. She graduated from Spelman College in Atlanta, Georgia in 1997 with a degree in mathematics.

== Modeling career ==
Sullivan began entering pageants at a young age, winning Miss Black Indiana. In 1991 at the age of 20, Sullivan won the Miss Black America pageant, representing as Miss Black Indiana.

After winning the pageant title, Sullivan began a career as a professional dancer. She toured with several hip hop and R&B artists such as; Keith Sweat and P. Diddy. She also toured for 3 1/2 years with James Brown.

== Professional wrestling career ==
=== World Championship Wrestling (1998–2001) ===
Sullivan joined World Championship Wrestling's (WCW) Nitro Girl dance troupe in December 1998, under the stage name Storm. During her time with the Nitro Girls, Sullivan performed for the live crowds during commercial breaks and engaged in various promotional works. Sullivan alongside other Nitro Girl's were a part of the short lived pop group Diversity 5. They released one single titled I Promise/Shake Me Up, which failed to chart, Sullivan left the group in 2001 to sign with the World Wrestling Federation (WWF).

In December 1999, Sullivan was renamed Paisley and became the valet for The Artist (Prince Iaukea). She managed The Artist through the WCW Cruiserweight tournament, landing him a title match at SuperBrawl 2000, against Lash LeRoux for the vacant WCW Cruiserweight Championship, in which The Artist won. She accompanied The Artist at the Uncensored pay-per-view in March 2000, where he regained the championship against Psychosis. Her debut match was a mixed tag team match on the March 15, 2000, episode of WCW Saturday Night, alongside The Artist in a losing effort to Billy Kidman and Torrie Wilson. She made her in-ring singles debut against Tammy Lynn Sytch on the April 26, 2000, episode of WCW Thunder, winning the match with a DDT. Shortly after The Artist was released from WCW, leading Sullivan to begin valeting for Kwee Wee.

She then formed a villainous alliance with fellow former Nitro Girl, Tygress, entering a feud with Major Gunns. Sullivan defeated Major Gunns on two separate occasions, first on the June 27, 2000, episode of WCW Thunder and for a second time on the August 22, 2000, episode of WCW Thunder. On the August 28, 2000, episode of WCW Nitro, Sullivan lost to Tygress in a triple threat match also including Major Gunns, she would however, defeat both Major Gunns and Tygress in a rematch the following night on the August 29, 2000, episode of WCW WorldWide. Her final match with WCW came on the September 19, 2000, episode of WCW Thunder, where she defeated Torrie Wilson in 50 seconds. In 2001 just before WCW was bought by the WWF, Sullivan was released from the company.

=== World Wrestling Federation/Entertainment (2001–2002, 2005–2007) ===
Shortly after being released from WCW, Sullivan signed a developmental contract with the WWF with the intent of becoming a full time professional wrestler and backstage interviewer. Sullivan was sent to WWF's developmental territory Ohio Valley Wrestling (OVW) to continue her training, becoming the valet of The Suicide Blondes, wearing a blonde wig and performing under the ring name Sister Sharmell. While in OVW Sullivan began feuding with Jazz, losing to her at the October 27, 2001, OVW television taping. Her training was cut short however, due to a severe ACL injury, forcing her to retire from in-ring work. In November 2001, Sullivan made her main roster debut as the official backstage interviewer of SmackDown!. Sullivan worked as the backstage interviewer of the show from November 2001 until early 2002, where she was granted her release and retired from professional wrestling to run a clothing store in Houston, Texas. She was featured in the WWE DVD special, WWE Divas: Tropical Pleasure.

In 2005 Sullivan was rehired by the (now renamed) WWE, re-debuting as a face, for her real life husband Booker T under her real name Sharmell. According to Booker T, Vince McMahon decided to resign Sullivan after their wedding so they could spend more time together. Sharmell and Booker T took part in a controversial feud with Kurt Angle, which began with Angle continually sexually harassing and stalking Sharmell. Including segments involving Angle orgasming over Sharmell, pretending to dream about her while he slept and admitting he wanted "perverted sex" with Sharmell. Sharmell featured in multiple backstage segments being comforted by her friend Joy Giovanni. Booker T defeated Angle at Judgment Day. However, on the June 2 episode of SmackDown! Angle defeated both Booker T and Sharmell in a handicap match, after pinning Sharmell in her WWE debut match. The feud ended one week later on the June 9, 2005, episode of SmackDown! when Booker T, accompanied by Sharmell, defeated Angle. On the August 18 episode of SmackDown! Sharmell and Booker T lost a mixed tag team match to Joey Mercury and Melina, after interference by MNM's valet Jillian Hall. The feud between MNM versus Sharmell and Booker T was shortly dropped due to real life heat between Sharmell and Melina.

Sharmell continued accompanying Booker T to his matches and began slowly turning heel. In October 2005 she began interfering in Booker T's matches without his knowledge, to help him win his matches. Her heel turn was officially cemented when she helped Booker T win the WWE United States Championship on the October 21, 2005, episode of SmackDown! where he defeated Chris Benoit. The following week on Smackdown! Booker T also turned heel, when he revealed he knew of her involvement in his matches the entire time. At Survivor Series, Sharmell was involved in a controversial, infamous backstage segment where WWE Chairman Vince McMahon, greeted Sharmell and Booker T by using a racial slur. That night Booker T defeated Benoit in a best of seven series. Benoit and Booker T continued to feud through No Way Out, where Benoit retained the title defeating Booker T, accompanied by Sharmell. Sharmell and Booker T then began a short lived feud with The Boogeyman. The Boogeyman kidnapped Sharmell on the March 31, 2006, episode of SmackDown!. The feud culminated at WrestleMania 22, when The Boogeyman defeated both Sharmell and Booker T in a handicap match, during the match The Boogeyman kissed Sharmell while he had a mouth full of worms.

Sharmell managed and helped Booker T emerge victorious in the 2006 King of the Ring tournament, where Booker T, accompanied by Sharmell, defeated Bobby Lashley in the finals at Judgment Day. Booker T then began referring to himself as King Booker and Sharmell as Queen Sharmell. As part of their new on-screen personas, the duo began speaking in faux British accents and behaving pompous. Sullivan also coined the phrase "all hail King Booker!" which she yelled before and after King Booker's matches. The duo then began a villainous group named King Booker's Court, recruiting Sir Finlay and Sir William Regal. On the July 7, 2006, episode of SmackDown! King Booker won a number 1 contender battle royal to face the World Champion Rey Mysterio at The Great American Bash, after the match both Queen Sharmell and King Booker attacked Mysterio backstage. At The Great American Bash, Queen Sharmell accompanied King Booker, who defeated Mysterio to win the World Championship, cementing the duo as the main event stars of the SmackDown! brand. At SummerSlam, King Booker retained his championship against Batista via disqualification after Queen Sharmell interfered in the match, attacking Batista. Batista alongside Bobby Lashley continued to feud with King Booker's Court in the following months. At No Mercy, King Booker retained the championship again in the main event, defeating Batista, Bobby Lashley and Finlay in a fatal four way match, the show ended with Queen Sharmell and King Booker celebrating with the championship. Queen Sharmell and King Booker were featured on the official advertisement poster for the pay-per-view. The following month at Cyber Sunday, King Booker being accompanied by Queen Sharmell, faced ECW World Champion Big Show and WWE Champion John Cena, in the main event in a triple threat match, for King Booker's World Heavyweight Championship, as voted by the WWE fans. During the match, Cena hit Queen Sharmell with an FU as she attempted to hit Cena with the championship belt, knocking Queen Sharmell out, distracting the referee, while distracted Kevin Federline interfered hitting Cena with the championship belt, letting King Booker pin Cena to retain the championship. Later that month at Survivor Series, King Booker lost the World Heavyweight Championship to Batista in the main event, had King Booker been counted out or disqualified because of Queen Sharmell's interference, he would lose the championship. During the match Batista went to hit Queen Sharmell with a Batista-Bomb, before throwing her outside the ring. At Armageddon the team of Batista and John Cena defeated King Booker and Finlay, being accompanied by Queen Sharmell in the main event, officially disbanding King Booker's Court. Queen Sarmell accompanied King Booker to the Royal Rumble match at the Royal Rumble, where he was eliminated by Kane. At WrestleMania 23, Queen Sharmell accompanied King Booker in the Money in the Bank ladder match, during the match Matt Hardy set Queen Sharmell up in the Twist of Fate, threatening to hit Queen Sharmell with the move, before King Booker decided to save her instead of win the match. On the April 6, 2007, episode of SmackDown! Queen Sharmell turned on King Booker, claiming his failure to defeat Matt Hardy that night, claiming he did not care for her honor. Later that night, King Booker tried to impress her by attacking the World Heavyweight Champion The Undertaker, which resulted in King Booker being hit with a Tombstone Piledriver, on the announce table, spraining his neck putting him out of action.

On the June 11, 2007, episode of Raw, Queen Sharmell and King Booker were drafted to the Raw brand as part of the 2007 WWE Draft. King Booker and Queen Sharmell returned to television, entering a brief feud against John Cena over the WWE Championship, losing a fatal five way match to Cena (that also involved Bobby Lashley, Mick Foley and Randy Orton) at Vengeance: Night of Champions main event. Queen Sharmell and King Booker then began feuding with Jerry "The King" Lawler, claiming only King Booker could be called a king. King Booker defeated Lawler on the August 6, 2007, episode of Raw. At SummerSlam King Booker was defeated by a returning Triple H.

Due to conflicts with storylines, issues with overall character direction and burn out, Queen Sharmell and King Booker requested and were granted their releases from their contracts by the WWE.

=== Total Nonstop Action Wrestling (2007–2009) ===
At the 2007 Gensis pay-per-view, Sullivan debuted for Total Nonstop Action Wrestling (TNA) in the main event, as a face, for the TNA World Heavyweight Championship, attacking Karen Angle. At the Turning Point pay-per-view, Sullivan accompanied Booker and Kaz to win against Christian Cage and Robert Roode. At Final Resolution 2008, Sullivan and Booker T defeated Ms. Brooks and Robert Roode in a mixed tag team match, after Sullivan pinned Brooks. After the match, Roode was arguing with Brooks, Sullivan returned to the ring to defend Brooks and stop Roode, only to get hit in the face and kayfabe breaking her jaw. Sullivan made her return two months later, at Destination X, coming to the aid of Booker T whipping Payton Banks and Roode. The two teams continued to feud until Lockdown, where Sullivan and Booker defeated Banks and Roode in a mixed tag team six sides of steel cage match.

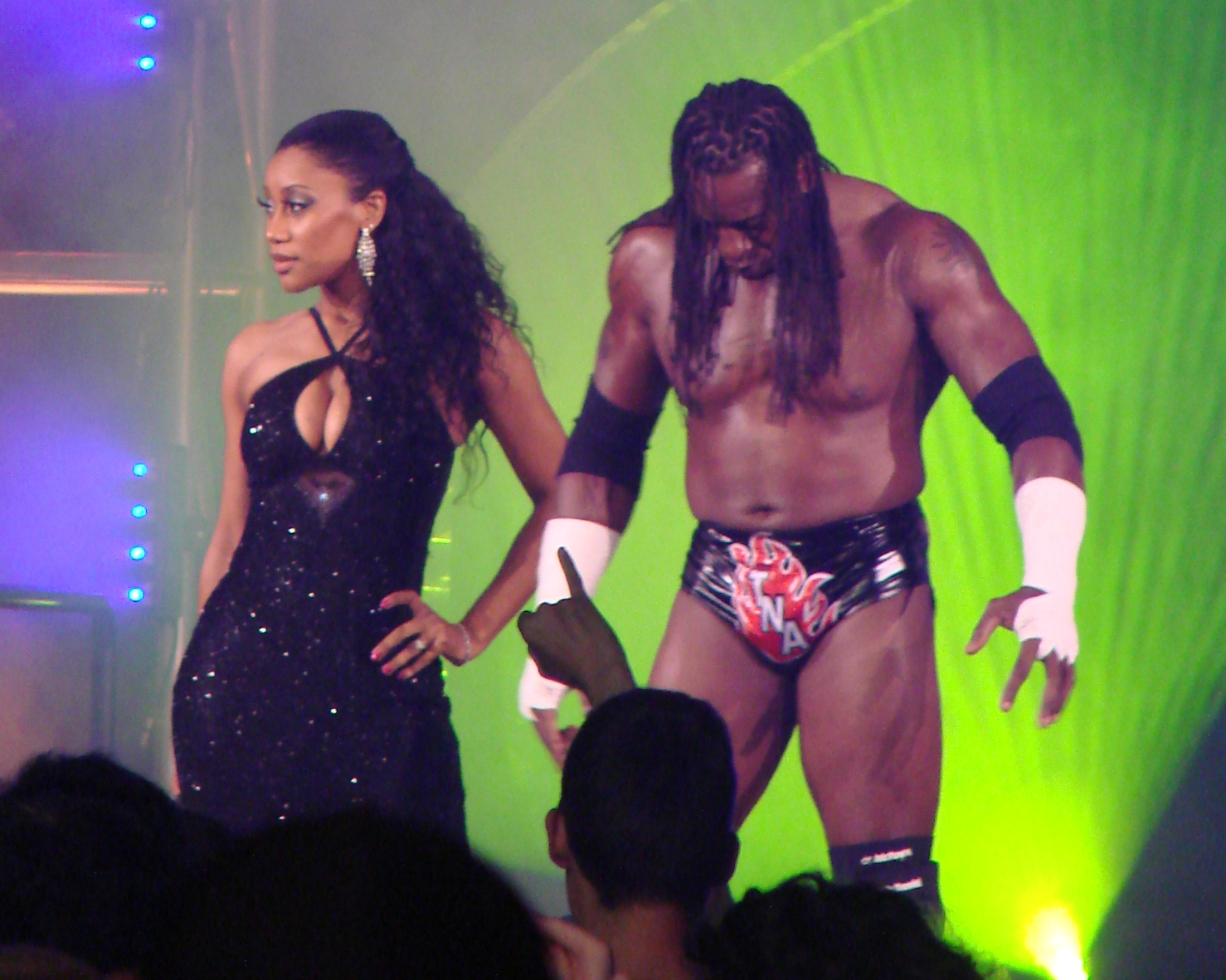
Booker T and Sharmell (left) in Total Nonstop Action Wrestling

Sullivan would then go inactive from the company for the next couple of months, following Booker T's heel turn, but returned at the Victory Road pay-per-view during the main event between her husband and Samoa Joe, also turning heel in the process by making the three-count herself, allowing her husband to win the TNA World Heavyweight Championship. Sullivan continued to accompany Booker to the ring for his matches, the duo joined The Main Event Mafia in October of that year. On the November 20, 2008, episode of Impact! Sullivan was challenged to a match with ODB at Final Resolution, which she accepted, at the event alongside The Beautiful People (Angelina Love and Velvet Sky), Sullivan's team lost to ODB, Taylor Wilde and Roxxi. Sullivan began arguing and disagreeing with fellow Main Event Mafia valet, Jenna Morasca, leading to a backstage catfight on the May 28, 2009, episode of Impact! this led to Sullivan challenging Morasca to a singles match at Victory Road. Sullivan with Sojournor Bolt in her corner, lost to Morasca who had Awesome Kong in her corner. Their match is infamously known as one of the worst professional wrestling matches in history, during the match the fans in the arena began turning their back to the match in protest. Wrestling journalist Dave Meltzer gave the match minus five stars.

Sullivan then went on to compete in the TNA Knockout Tag Team Championship tournament teaming with Traci Brooks, representing The Main Event Mafia, they were eliminated in the first round after losing to Awesome Kong and Raisha Saeed, in Sullivan's last televised wrestling match. Sullivan and Booker T's final appearance for the company was at Bound for Glory, before being granted their release from the company. Sullivan then ultimately retired from wrestling.

=== Reality of Wrestling (2005–present) ===
In 2005 Sullivan and Huffman founded wrestling school and independent promotion, Reality of Wrestling. The promotion works alongside local charities, including the Fight For Kids Foundation, which helps children stay off the streets and gives them benefits towards better lives. Sullivan works as a coach for the promotion. On October 29, 2024, ROW became an independent wrestling school for the WWE's developmental program designed for the independent wrestlers called WWE ID, short for WWE Independent Development.

=== Return to WWE (2022–present) ===
In 2013 Sullivan appeared at the WWE Hall of Fame to watch her husband be inducted. In 2021, WWE listed Sullivan was acknowledged as one of the women who made a large impact as a valet in the WWE. The following year it was announced she would be inducted in to the WWE Hall of Fame. Sullivan appeared on the May 1, 2023, episode of RAW alongside her husband to announce the draft picks for the 2023 WWE Draft. At the 2025 Evolution pay-per-view, Sullivan was once again acknowledged as one of the pioneers of women's wrestling in WWE history.

== Personal life ==
Sullivan and Huffman began dating while they both worked for WCW, the couple married in February 2005. She has a stepson Brandon, from a relationship Huffman had in high school. Sullivan gave birth to twins, a boy and a girl, named Kendrick and Kennedy on August 5, 2010.

== Filmography ==
Film and television
Year	Title	Role	Notes
1999	WCW Nitro Girls Swimsuit Calendar Special	Storm	TV special
2000	BET Tonight with Ed Gordon	Self; guest	1 episode
2000	Ready to Rumble	Storm	
2002	WWF Divas: Sex on the Beach	Sharmell	TV special
2002	WWF Divas: Tropical Pleasure	Sharmell	Direct to DVD
2007	WWE 2007 Hall of Fame	Self; guest	TV special
2007	Family Feud	Self; contestant	5 episodes
2008	TNA Today	Sharmell	1 episode
2012	WWE 2012 Hall of Fame	Self; guest	TV special
2013	WWE 2013 Hall of Fame	Self; guest	TV special
2014	WWE 2014 Hall of Fame	Self; guest	TV special
2016	WWE 24	Self; guest	1 episode
2016	WWE 2016 Hall of Fame	Self; guest	TV special
2017	WWE 2017 Hall of Fame	Self; guest	TV special
2020	BKS, Best Kept Secret	Jackie Collins	TV film
2021	Bigger	Stella	1 episode
2021	Biography: WWE Legends	Self; feature	1 episode
2021	WWE's Most Wanted Treasures	Self; feature	1 episode
2022	WWE 2022 Hall of Fame	Self; inductee	TV special
2022	Mike	City council member	1 episode
2023	Chicago P.D.	Judge	1 episode
2024	Who Killed WCW?	Self; interviewee	Documentary, 2 episodes
2024	Sundown	Jewel Richards	
2025	WWE 2025 Hall of Fame	Self; guest	TV special

== Championships and accomplishments ==
=== Beauty pageant ===
- Miss Black America
  - Miss Black America (1991)

=== Professional wrestling ===
- Wrestling Observer Newsletter
  - Worst Worked Match of the Year (2009) vs. Jenna Morasca at Victory Road
- WWE
  - WWE Hall of Fame (Class of 2022)
