= Carlotta Montanari =

Italian actress

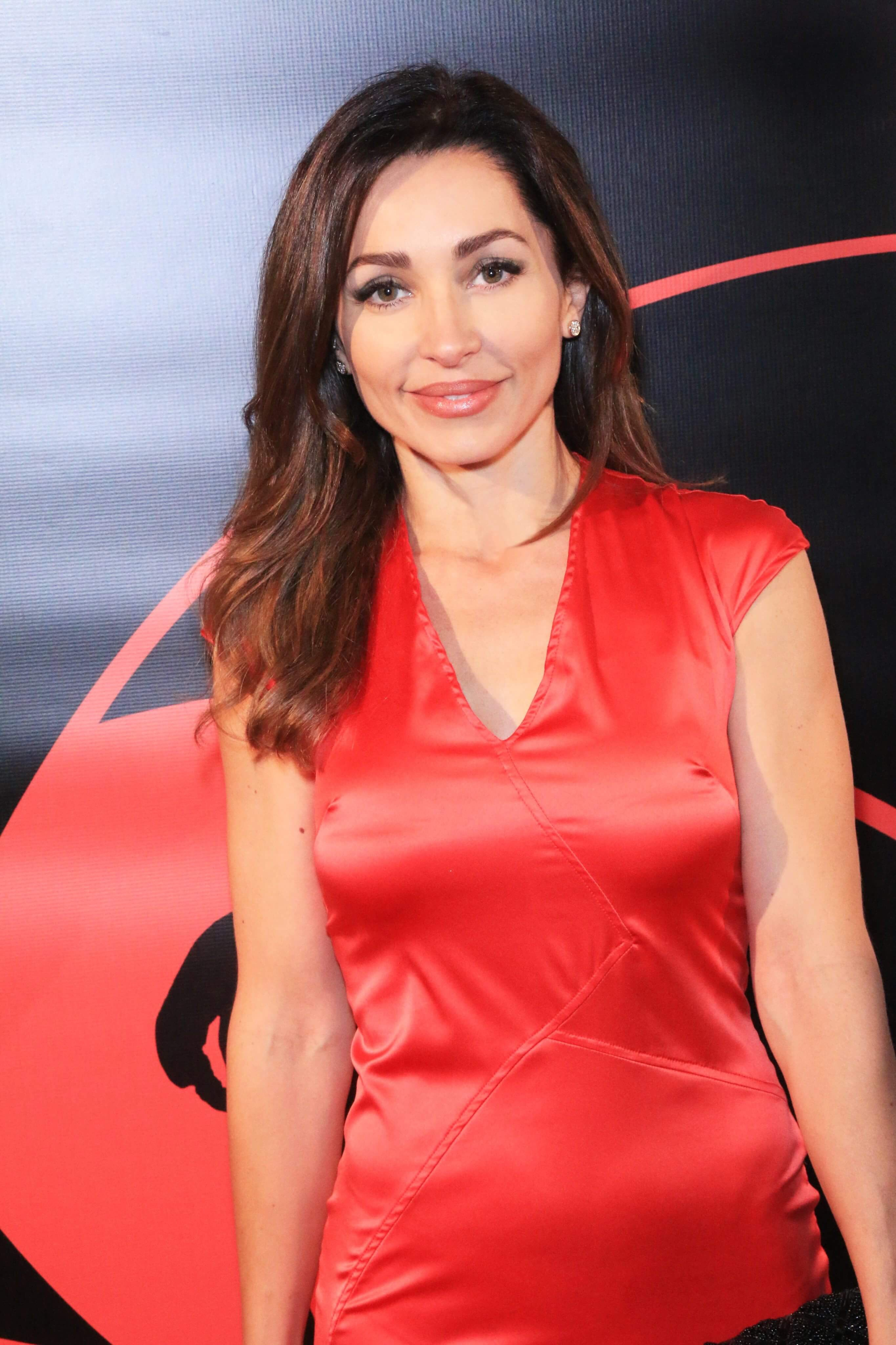
- Carlotta Montanari attending "And the Winner Isn't" Premiere in Beverly Hills
- Born: Carlotta Montanari; 17 February 1981; Rimini, Italy
- Occupation(s): Actress, former TV host
- Years active: 2003 – present

Carlotta Sofia Montanari is an Italian film actress and former TV host. She has appeared in the films The Mason Brothers and Being American, and on television in Parenthood and American Crime Story.

== Work ==
Montanari has made a number of appearances on television in Italy. She has contributed to the website LiberaMente.

She has read an audiobook, The Malice Of Fortune by Michael Ennis, and voiced a language-learning video for children.

== Filmography ==
Year	Film	Role	Notes
2019	"Too Old To Die Young"	Magdalena	Amazon Video
2018	"American Crime Story"	Angela	FX
2017	"The Mason Brothers"	Allena	US movie
2017	"Mission S.O.P."	Monica Baker	US movie
2014	"Being American"	Karen, Co -Producer	US movie
2014	Parenthood (2010 TV series)	Art Teacher	TV series
2013	"Trash"	Giulia, co-producer	US short film
2013	"The Vatican"	Voice	US movie
2013	"LA Superheroes"	Samantha	US movie
2012	"The Rift"	The Tourist	US movie
2012	"Choices"	Louise	US short film
2009	"Medicina generale"	Motorcyclist	Mediaset
2009	"The Friends at the Margherita Cafe"	Worker	DUEA Production
2008	"Incantesimo 10"	Nurse Laura	RAI TV
2008	"Carabinieri"	Police Officer	Mediaset
2008	"La solitudine del portiere"	Elena	ITA short film
2005–2007	"Rome"	Beggar	US TV Series
2006	"Il mio amico Babbo Natale 2"	Officer	ITA TV mini-series
2006	"The Borgia"	Dancer	US TV movie

== Television ==
=== Hosting ===
- Talent Uno music show (2007) - Italia 1, Italy
- Charity LIVE Show "Note D'Incanto" (2007) - Rai 1, Italy
- Charity Show LIVE "Stelle E Note Di Natale" second edition (2006) - Rai 2, Italy
- Game Show LIVE "Quizissimo" (47 total), (2005) – Italia 7 Gold, Italy
- Charity Show LIVE "Stelle E Note Di Natale" (2003) - Rai 1, Italy
- RaiLife LIVE show (7 total) 2003) - Rai 1, Italy
