= Shad Gaspard =

American wrestler and actor (1981–2020)

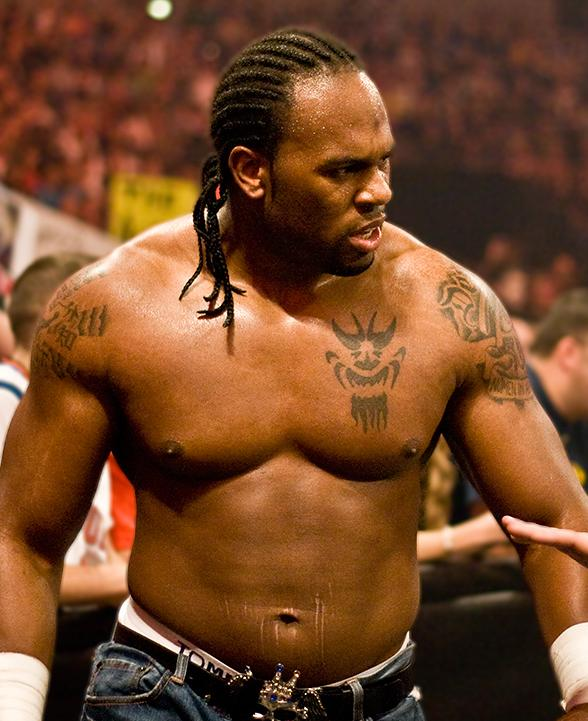
- Gaspard in 2008
- Born: Shad Javier Gaspard; January 13, 1981; New York City, U.S.
- Died: May 17, 2020 (aged 39); Los Angeles, California, U.S.
- Spouse: Siliana Gaspard (m. 2009)
- Children: 1
- Professional wrestling career
- Ring name(s): Da Beast; Shad; Shad Gaspard
- Billed height: 6 ft 7 in (201 cm)
- Billed weight: 295 lb (134 kg)
- Billed from: Brooklyn, New York
- Trained by: Ohio Valley Wrestling; Rocky Johnson; Al Snow; DeWayne Bruce
- Debut: 2003

Shad Javier Gaspard (January 13, 1981 – May 17, 2020) was an American professional wrestler, actor and stunt performer. He was best known for his time with WWE, where he performed under his real name, or mononymously as Shad.

Gaspard signed with World Wrestling Entertainment (WWE) in 2003, where he was assigned to their developmental territory Ohio Valley Wrestling (OVW) and was a two-time OVW Southern Tag Team Champion with JTG, as part of Cryme Tyme. In 2006, Cryme Tyme was promoted to WWE's main roster, before both Gaspard and JTG were released from the company the following year. Cryme Tyme returned to WWE in 2008, but Gaspard was released again in 2010.

After departing WWE, Gaspard pursued an acting career that included several films and television roles, such as Think Like a Man Too, Get Hard, The Game, and From Dusk till Dawn: The Series. He was also the co-creator of the 2011 graphic novel Assassin & Son and provided motion capture for video games, most notably for the protagonist Kratos in the 2018 game God of War.

Gaspard drowned while trying to save his son from a rip current on May 17, 2020. He was posthumously awarded the Warrior Award at the WWE Hall of Fame ceremony in 2022.

== Early life ==
Shad Gaspard was born in the Brooklyn borough of New York City on January 13, 1981. He was of Curaçaoan and Haitian descent. His father was a former enforcer for street gangs and later a personal security guard in the early 1970s; he worked for gangster Frank Lucas and currently owns McFay Contracting Inc. At age five, Shad was trained by his father in boxing, and at age eight he began training in a mixture of different martial arts such as judo, kickboxing, Jeet Kune Do, and Muay Thai.

At age 16, Gaspard began prize fighting for promoter Hardbody Harrison, a former WCW wrestler and FX Tough Man Champion, in bar fighting tournaments such as boxing, kickboxing, MMA, and tough man competitions. Although he was only 16 years old, he competed against adults who were up to 20 years older due to his large size. He held win–loss records in MMA (35–7) and amateur boxing (57–26). He was extensively involved in athletics during his high school years, specializing in wrestling, track, and basketball. After high school, he continued to play basketball at Georgia Perimeter College. After leaving, he became a bodyguard for several celebrities, including P. Diddy and Mike Tyson.

== Professional wrestling career ==
=== World Wrestling Entertainment (2002–2007) ===
==== Tough Enough and Ohio Valley Wrestling (2002–2006) ====
Gaspard decided to become a professional wrestler, and he qualified for the finals of the reality television program Tough Enough 2 in 2002, but was disqualified and replaced after failing a physical.

After Tough Enough, Gaspard was recruited by WWE talent scout Tom Prichard and allowed to attempt a career as a professional wrestler. He first trained with Dewayne Bruce from the WCW Power Plant for six months. Afterwards, he was signed to a developmental contract by World Wrestling Entertainment (WWE), and he was assigned to Ohio Valley Wrestling (OVW). Gaspard made his OVW debut in 2003 under the ring name 'Da Beast', eventually joining Bolin Services stable, which led by Kenny Bolin. Originally, he acted as Bolin's personal enforcer, until he was placed into a tag team with Carlos Colón Jr. in February 2004. After Colón left OVW in October 2004, Gaspard left Bolin Services and formed several short lived tag teams with Osama, Mike Mondo, Ken Doane, and Ryan Wilson, before he began wrestling under his real name as a singles wrestler.

==== Cryme Tyme (2006–2007) ====
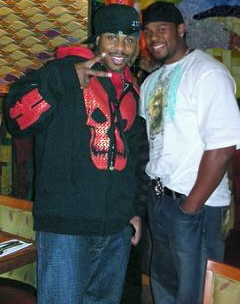
Cryme Tyme – Gaspard (right) and JTG, at an autograph signing in 2007

In early 2006, during his feud in OVW with CM Punk, Gaspard was joined by The Neighborhoodie and formed a new tag team known as The Gang Stars. The Gang Stars won the OVW Southern Tag Team Championship on May 27, but they lost the titles to CM Punk and Seth Skyfire on July 28.

On the September 4, 2006 episode of Raw, a series of vignettes began airing, hyping the debut of Cryme Tyme (Gaspard and The Neighborhoodie, with Neighborhoodie's ring name changing to JTG). On the October 16 episode of Raw, Cryme Tyme made their in-ring debut by defeating then-World Tag Team Champions The Spirit Squad (Mikey and Johnny) in a non-title match. The duo made their pay-per-view debut at Cyber Sunday, where Cryme Tyme defeated Lance Cade and Trevor Murdoch, Charlie Haas and Viscera and The Highlanders (Robbie McAllister and Rory McAllister) in a Texas Tornado match (as voted by the fans). A few months later at the New Year's Revolution pay-per-view, Cryme Tyme won a Tag Team Turmoil Match against The Highlanders, The World's Greatest Tag Team (Charlie Haas and Shelton Benjamin), Lance Cade and Trevor Murdoch, and Jim Duggan and Super Crazy, earning them a shot at the World Tag Team Championships. On April 1, 2007, at WrestleMania 23, Cryme Tyme made a cameo appearance and started a dance party with Eugene and some WWE legends in the backstage area. On the June 29 episode of SmackDown!, Deuce 'n Domino (with Cherry) defeated Cryme Tyme in an inter-brand match tag match. While Deuce, Domino and Cherry celebrated their victory, Cryme Tyme appeared on the titantron and kayfabe stole their car, taking it to Brisco Brothers Auto Shop to sell it for parts chanting "Money, money, yeah, yeah". In July, Cryme Tyme returned to OVW and regained the OVW Southern Tag Team Championship on July 21 from The James Boys (KC James and Kassidy James), becoming two-time tag team champions, but they lost the titles back to them the following day.

On the August 13 episode of Raw, Cryme Tyme returned to their hometown of New York City, losing to then-World Tag Team Champions Lance Cade and Trevor Murdoch in a non-title match by disqualification, when Gaspard used a chair on Murdoch. On the August 27 episode of Raw, Cryme Tyme stole Murdoch's hat and gave it away to a fan, starting a feud between them. However, on September 2, 2007, Gaspard and JTG were both released from their WWE contracts.

=== Independent circuit (2007–2008) ===
After being released from WWE, Gaspard lost to Psicosis at a Pro Wrestling Alliance (PWA) event on September 22 in Houston, Texas. Gaspard, along with JTG wrestled at Jersey All Pro Wrestling's (JAPW) 10th Anniversary Show on October 27, 2007, defeating The Dirty Rotten Scoundrelz. They left the promotion undefeated after defeating Style and Finesse (Mike Donovan and Rob Vegas) in January 2008's Reclaiming Hudson event.

=== Return to WWE (2008–2010) ===
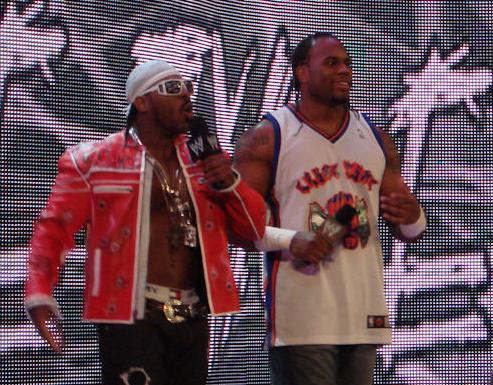
Cryme Tyme returned to WWE in 2008

On the March 31, 2008 episode of Raw, Gaspard and JTG returned to WWE as Cryme Tyme, defeating Lance Cade and Trevor Murdoch. Cryme Tyme began working with John Cena on the June 30 episode of Raw, when they helped him interfere during John "Bradshaw" Layfield's (JBL) match. The following week, they again appeared together in a backstage segment, when they vandalized JBL's limo. After a house show match, Cena confirmed that they had created a faction and announced that it was called Cryme Tyme Cenation (CTC). Cryme Tyme also started a feud with the World Tag Team Champions Cody Rhodes and Ted DiBiase, stealing their championship belts for a time, then losing a title match to them at the Unforgiven pay-per-view event.

On April 15, 2009, Cryme Tyme was drafted to the SmackDown brand as part of the Draft. They made their debut on the brand on the May 1 episode of SmackDown, hosting a dance contest between Eve Torres and Layla. The team made their in-ring debut on the May 22 episode of SmackDown, where they teamed up with John Morrison to defeat The World's Greatest Tag Team and Ricky Ortiz. On the July 31 episode of SmackDown, Cryme Tyme defeated The Hart Dynasty (David Hart Smith and Tyson Kidd) to become the number one contenders for the Unified WWE Tag Team Championship. At SummerSlam, they failed to capture the titles against Jeri-Show (Chris Jericho and Big Show). On March 28, 2010, at WrestleMania XXVI, Gaspard competed in a battle royal, with Gaspard and JTG eliminating Luke Gallows, before Gaspard eliminated JTG, and Shad was later eliminated by William Regal.

On the April 2 episode of SmackDown, after Cryme Tyme lost a match, Gaspard attacked JTG, thus turning heel and disbanding Cryme Tyme in the process. The next week on SmackDown, Gaspard taunted JTG by showing footage of the attack, and JTG attempted to attack him, but was laid out by Gaspard. The following week, after JTG's match against Caylen Croft, Gaspard attacked JTG, but was eventually fought off. On the April 22 episode of WWE Superstars, Gaspard, now sporting a new attire and a new theme song, defeated Goldust. Their feud led to a strap match at Extreme Rules, which JTG won. The two faced off again on the May 6 episode of Superstars, where Gaspard was victorious, thus ending their feud. Gaspard made his final television appearance on the May 14 episode of SmackDown, where he defeated Jesse Guyver. On November 19, 2010, he was released from his WWE contract.

=== Japan (2011) ===
On February 5, 2011, Gaspard went to Japan and worked for Antonio Inoki's Inoki Genome Federation (IGF), where he teamed with Bobby Lashley in a loss to Atsushi Sawada and Erik Hammer.

=== Return to the independent circuit (2011–2020) ===
After being released a second time by WWE, Gaspard returned to the independent circuit, and on January 22, 2011, he defeated Charlie Haas at FWE Retribution in New York City. On March 31, 2012, he lost to Big Daddy V at WrestleRama in Georgetown, Guyana. From 2012 to 2014, Shad mainly focused on his acting career. It was announced on June 19, 2014, that Gaspard and JTG were looking for booking interests labeled now as the slightly altered Crime Time, as JTG was released by WWE. They wrestled the first match on their Crime Time World Tour on August 23, 2014, for the Warriors of Wrestling promotion in Staten Island. At the JAPW 18th Anniversary Show on November 15, 2014, Crime Time defeated Damien Darling and Danny Demento in a tag team match. Gaspard then continued to wrestle alongside JTG, until his death in 2020.

== Personal life ==
Gaspard married Siliana, a fitness model and athlete, in 2009. Their son was born in April 2010.

On December 11, 2016, Gaspard prevented the armed robbery of a gas station in Coral Springs, Florida, when he was approached by an intoxicated man who was intent on robbing the station. Gaspard shoved the man, took away his gun, and restrained him until police arrived.

=== Legal issues ===
On March 5, 2011, Gaspard was arrested by police in Columbus, Ohio, for having allegedly refused the commands of a police officer and resisted arrest for jaywalking. He was later cleared of all charges in July 2011.

== Disappearance and death ==
On May 17, 2020, Gaspard and his son were among a group of swimmers caught in a strong rip current in the Venice Beach neighborhood of Los Angeles. He told lifeguards to save his son before saving him, but disappeared underwater soon after. His son was safely rescued. The Coast Guard's search team was joined by professional wrestlers JTG, John Morrison, and Chris Masters. On May 19, after searching 70 square nautical miles (240 km^{2}), the Coast Guard suspended the search. On May 20, Gaspard's body was found washed ashore in Venice Beach and was identified by the Los Angeles County coroner's office. He was 39 years old. On December 21, his widow filed court documents against the state of California and the city of Los Angeles, alleging negligence, dangerous condition of public property, and insufficient signs warning of the dangers of swimming in the area.

== Legacy and tributes ==
After his death saving his son, Gaspard was awarded by Pro Wrestling Illustrated readers with the PWI Most Inspirational Wrestler of the Year. Dave Meltzer also announced that he would include a "Shad Gaspard Award" for outside the ring contributions for the betterment of society. In 2021, Meltzer created the Shad Gaspard/Jon Huber Memorial Award, named after Gaspard and fellow wrestler Jonathan Huber, who also died in 2020. In 2022, WWE also honored him with that year's Warrior Award for his actions that day.

== Other media ==
Gaspard appeared in video games as a playable character in WWE SmackDown vs. Raw 2008, WWE SmackDown vs. Raw 2009, WWE SmackDown vs. Raw 2010, and WWE SmackDown vs. Raw 2011.

In January 2012, he was advertised as appearing on the BET television series The Game, as well as TV Land's original situation comedy The Exes in October 2012. He was also working on other upcoming films and often performed stunts. Besides wrestling and acting, Gaspard also did modeling and worked on a comic book.

In 2013, Gaspard performed in the stage adaptation of "Pugilist" as Jack Johnson, the first African American world heavyweight boxing champion (1908–1915), depicting the fighter's rise to the world heavyweight championship, and his tragic fall.

In 2018, Gaspard provided the motion capture for protagonist Kratos of the video game God of War.

== Filmography ==
Film
Year	Title	Role	Notes
2012	Petunia	XL	
2014	Think Like a Man Too	The Goldenrod	
2015	Get Hard	Big Ass Julian	
2015	Brothers	Ronnie Cross	Bollywood film debut
2015	My First Miracle	Jack	
2015	Wrestling Isn't Wrestling	Theater Audience Member	Short film
2016	Officer Downe	Brick	
2017	Welcome to Willits	Captain Carter	
2017	Sandy Wexler	—N/a	Performed stunts
2019	Bolden	Aaron Harris	
2020	Birds of Prey	Lords leader	Also performed stunts; Final role

Television
Year	Title	Role	Notes
2012	The Game	Shad	2 episodes
2012	The Exes	Warren	1 episode
2013	Big Time Rush	Marcus	1 episode
2014	The Haunted Hathaways	Officer Bugliari	2 episodes
2014–2015	Key & Peele	Actor	2 episodes
2015	Nicky, Ricky, Dicky & Dawn	Lou	1 episode
2016	From Dusk till Dawn: The Series	Olmeca	3 episodes
2017	In the Cut	Tony	2 episodes
2018	The Last Sharknado: It's About Time	Muhammad Ali	TV movie

Video games
Year	Title	Role	Notes
2017–2018	Batman: The Enemy Within	Bane	Performed motion capture and stunts
2018	God of War	Kratos	Motion capture

== Championships and accomplishments ==
- NWA Wildside
  - NWA Wildside Tag Team Championship (1 time) – with JTG
- Fighting Evolution Wrestling
  - FEW Tag Team Championship (1 time) – with JTG
- Ohio Valley Wrestling
  - OVW Southern Tag Team Championship (2 times) – with The Neighborhoodie / JTG
- Pro Wrestling Illustrated
  - Inspirational Wrestler of the Year (2020)
  - Ranked No. 85 of the top 500 singles wrestlers in the PWI 500 in 2010
- Superstars of Wrestling Federation
  - SWF Tag Team Championship (1 time) – with JTG
- VIP Wrestling
  - VIP Tag Team Championship (1 time) – with JTG
- World Wrestling Alliance
  - WWA Tag Team Championship (1 time) – with JTG
- Wrestling Observer Newsletter
  - Shad Gaspard/Jon Huber Memorial Award (2020)
- WWE
  - WWE Hall of Fame (Class of 2022 – Warrior Award)

== See also ==
- List of solved missing person cases (2020s)
