= The Mason Brothers =

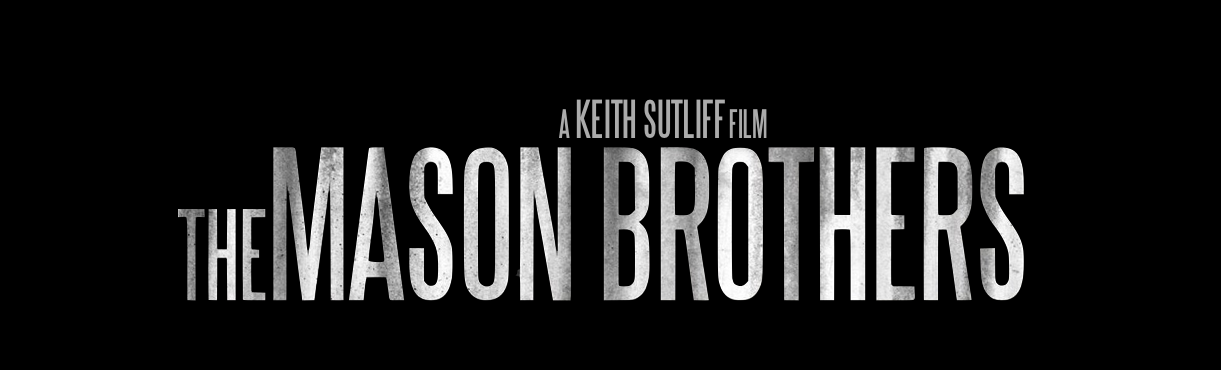
- Official Title
- Directed by: Keith Sutliff
- Written by: Keith Sutliff
- Produced by: Keith Sutliff
- Starring: Keith Sutliff; Brandon Sean Pearson; Matthew Webb; Tim Park; Julien Cesario; Carlotta Montanari
- Cinematography: Errol Webber Jr.
- Edited by: Gio Arias
- Music by: Federico Vaona
- Production company: KS Pictures
- Distributed by: Adler & Associates
- Release date: April 14, 2017
- Running time: 118 minutes
- Country: United States
- Language: English

The Mason Brothers is a 2017 American crime drama film written, directed by and starring Keith Sutliff. It also stars Brandon Sean Pearson, Matthew Webb, Tim Park, Julien Cesario, and Carlotta Montanari.

== Cast ==
- Keith Sutliff as Ren Mason
- Brandon Sean Pearson as Jesse Mason
- Matthew Webb as Gage
- Tim Park as Jerry
- Julien Cesario as Fredrick
- Carlotta Montanari as Allena
- Michael Rayan Whelan as Orion Mason
- Erica Souza as Violet
- Alexandra Rousset as Helen
- Gregory Gordon as Diego
- Pelé Kizy as Cyrus
- Steve Bethers as Lance
- David Trevino as Tony
- Nazo Bravo as Adrian

== Critics ==
The film received mixed reviews. Michael Rechtshaffen of the LA Times said of the film "this lifeless serving of soggy pulp packs all the gritty authenticity of a gummy vitamin."

365 Flicks Indie Review Irish Film Critic PopHorror.com Review From Page 2 Screen Following Films Golden State Haunts First Showing Carry On Harry Il Cineocchio Nerdly Bloody Disgusting Horror Society Search My Trash Blaber Buzz Flickering Myth The Slaughtered Bird Rouge Cinema Tampa Bay Times Screen Anarchy
