= Promised Land (2022 TV series) =

2022 American family drama television series

- Genre: Drama
- Created by: Matt Lopez
- Starring: John Ortiz; Cecilia Suárez; Augusto Aguilera; Christina Ochoa; Mariel Molino; Tonatiuh; Andres Velez; Katya Martín; Rolando Chusan; Bellamy Young
- Music by: Gustavo Santaolalla and Kevin Kiner
- Country of origin: United States
- Original language: English
- No. of seasons: 1
- No. of episodes: 10

Production
- Executive producers: Michael Cuesta; Maggie Malina; Adam Kolbrenner; Matt Lopez
- Producers: John LaBrucherie; Joe DeOliveira; P. Todd Coe
- Cinematography: John Peters; Anthony Vietro; James Sterba
- Editors: Kane Platt; Joe Mitacek; Sandra Torres Granovsky; Luis Colina; Justin Chinn; Jennifer Hatton
- Running time: 42–56 minutes
- Production companies: Neptune Way; Lit Entertainment; Little Mountain Films; ABC Signature

Original release
- Network: ABC
- Release: January 24 – February 21, 2022
- Network: Hulu
- Release: March 1 – March 29, 2022

Promised Land is an American family drama television series that premiered on January 24, 2022, on ABC. The story focuses on Joe Sandoval, patriarch of two blended Latino families who runs a successful Sonoma County, California vineyard and is preparing to hand the vineyard's management to one of his children. Two sub-plots involve the challenges of undocumented immigrants from Mexico who come to work at the vineyard, and conflicts with a hotel owner who blames Sandoval (who bought the vineyard from her father) for her father's death. The final five episodes of the series premiered on Hulu. In May 2022, the series was officially canceled after one season.

== Cast and characters ==
=== Main ===
- John Ortiz as Joe Sandoval, the patriarch of the Sandoval family and owner of Heritage House Vineyards in Sonoma Valley
- Cecilia Suárez as Lettie Sandoval, Joe's second wife and the matriarch of the Sandoval family
- Augusto Aguilera as Mateo Flores, Lettie's son from a previous marriage and Joe's stepson who is the general manager of Heritage House Vineyards. He is also Billy's son and therefore secretly Joe's nephew.
- Christina Ochoa as Veronica Sandoval, Joe's eldest daughter
- Mariel Molino as Carmen Sandoval, Joe's youngest daughter
- Tonatiuh as Antonio Sandoval, Joe's older son
- Andres Velez as Carlos Rincón, a young undocumented immigrant who crosses the border into the United States to work at Heritage House Vineyards in 1987. He becomes Jose/Joe Sandoval with fake papers from his brother Roberto/Billy.
- Katya Martín as Juana Sánchez, a young undocumented immigrant who crosses the border into the United States with her sister, Rosa in 1987. She becomes Leticia/Letty with fake documents from Guillermo/Billy.
- Rolando Chusan as Billy Rincón, an undocumented Heritage House Vineyards worker and Carlos' older brother in 1987. His birthname is Roberto; he assumes the name Guillermo (William/Billy in English) with fake documents.
- Bellamy Young as Margaret Honeycroft, Joe's ex-wife and Veronica, Carmen, and Antonio's mother who is determined to take back Heritage House Vineyards. She owns Honeycroft Hotel and is a hotel tycoon.

=== Recurring ===
- Ariana Guerra as Rosa, Juana's sister in 1987
- Miguel Ángel García as Junior, Joe and Lettie's son and the youngest Sandoval sibling
- Andrew J. West as Michael Paxton, Veronica's husband
- Natalia del Riego as Daniela, an undocumented immigrant from El Salvador who is recently fired as a maid from the Sandoval mansion due to her immigration status
- Yul Vazquez as Father Ramos, Joe's brother and Mateo's father
- Tom Amandes as O.M. Honeycroft, Margaret's father in 1987
- Kerri Medders as Young Margaret
- Julio Macias as Javier, the newly hired general manager of Heritage House Vineyards and Antonio's secret former boyfriend

== Episodes ==
No.	Title	Directed by	Written by	Original air/release date	U.S. viewers (millions)
ABC
1	"A Place Called Heritage"	Michael Cuesta	Matt Lopez	January 24, 2022	1.89
2	"La Madrugada" "Day Break"	Edward Ornelas	Matt Lopez	January 31, 2022 (Note: This episode was released early on Hulu on January 25, 2022.)	1.77
3	"La Lucha" "The Struggle"	Nick Copus	Emilia Serrano	February 7, 2022	1.68
4	"El Regalo" "The Gift"	Felix Enriquez Alcalá	Michael Jones-Morales	February 14, 2022	1.54
5	"Los Rivales" "Rivals"	Clara Aranovich	Talia Gonzalez	February 21, 2022	1.60
Hulu
6	"El Cuchicheo" "The Whispering"	Nick Gomez	Christopher Oscar Peña	March 1, 2022	N/A
7	"El Mejor de los Tiempos" "The Best of Times"	Ryan Zaragoza	Tara Tomicevic	March 8, 2022	N/A
8	"La Verdad Te Hara Libre" "The Truth Shall Set You Free"	Chi-Yoon Chung	Jamie Conway	March 15, 2022	N/A
9	"La Cosecha" "The Harvest"	Lily Mariye	Mark Wilding	March 22, 2022	N/A
10	"La Tierra Prometida" "The Promised Land"	Edward Ornelas	Matt Lopez	March 29, 2022	N/A

== Production ==
=== Development ===
In February 2021, ABC ordered a pilot for a family drama titled Promised Land, originally titled American Heritage, from writer and executive producer Matt Lopez. In April 2021, it was announced that Michael Cuesta would direct the pilot episode and be an executive producer. On August 11, 2021, Promised Land was given a series order. On May 6, 2022, ABC officially canceled the series after one season.

=== Casting ===
In March 2021, Christina Ochoa was cast to play the role of Veronica Sandoval. The following day, Mariel Molino landed the role of Carmen Sandoval. In April, it was announced that Andres Velez would portray Carlos Rincón. The following week, John Ortiz was cast in the role as Joe Sandoval. Three days later, Cecilia Suárez & Augusto Aguilera were cast as Lettie Sandoval and Mateo Flores respectively. The following week, Tonatiuh Elizarraraz was cast as Antonio Sandoval, and the day after that, Katya Martín was cast as Juana Sánchez. In May 2021, Rolando Chusan was cast as Billy Rincón. In October 2021, Bellamy Young was cast as Margaret Honeycroft. In January 2022, Yul Vazquez, Julio Macias, Ariana Guerra, Kerri Medders, Tom Amandes, Natalia del Riego, and Miguel Angel Garcia joined the cast in recurring roles.

== Release ==
The series premiered on January 24, 2022, on ABC. Due to low ratings, ABC pulled Promised Land from the schedule, effective after the fifth episode on February 21, 2022. The final five episodes streamed exclusively on Hulu from March 1 to March 29, 2022. Previously, episodes had been posted to Hulu next-day after premiere as is custom with ABC shows. Internationally, the series premiered on Disney+ under the dedicated streaming hub Star as an original series, on July 6, 2022. In Latin America, the series premiered on Star+ on July 27, 2022. Promised Land was later removed from Disney+, Star+, Hulu and all other Disney owned streaming services in October 2022 despite only being available recently. This is one of the first few titles along with Rebel to be removed from Disney+ due to Disney's budget cuts.

== Reception ==
=== Critical response ===
The review aggregator website Rotten Tomatoes reported a 100% approval rating with an average rating of 7.4/10, based on 7 critic reviews. Metacritic, which uses a weighted average, assigned a score of 72 out of 100 based on 5 critics, indicating "generally favorable reviews".

=== Ratings ===
Viewership and ratings per episode of Promised Land
No.	Title	Air date	Rating (18–49)	Viewers (millions)	DVR (18–49)	DVR viewers (millions)	Total (18–49)	Total viewers (millions)
1	"A Place Called Heritage"	January 24, 2022	0.2	1.89	0.1	0.96	0.3	2.85 (Note: Live+7 ratings were unavailable, so Live+3 ratings have been used instead.)
2	"La Madrugada (Day Break)"	January 31, 2022	0.2	1.77	—N/a	—N/a	—N/a	—N/a
3	"La Lucha (The Struggle)"	February 7, 2022	0.2	1.68	—N/a	—N/a	—N/a	—N/a
4	"El Regalo (The Gift)"	February 14, 2022	0.2	1.54	—N/a	—N/a	—N/a	—N/a
5	"Los Rivales (Rivals)"	February 21, 2022	0.2	1.60	0.1	0.62	0.3	2.21
