= Too Old to Die Young =

Television series

- Promotional poster
- Genre: Crime drama; Neo-noir; Neo-Western; Satire; Surrealism; Thriller; Urban fantasy
- Created by: Nicolas Winding Refn; Ed Brubaker
- Written by: Nicolas Winding Refn; Ed Brubaker; Halley Gross
- Directed by: Nicolas Winding Refn
- Starring: Miles Teller; Augusto Aguilera; Cristina Rodlo; Nell Tiger Free; John Hawkes; Jena Malone
- Composer: Cliff Martinez
- Country of origin: United States
- Original language: English
- No. of seasons: 1
- No. of episodes: 10

Production
- Executive producers: Nicolas Winding Refn; Ed Brubaker; Jeffrey Stott; Joe Lewis
- Producers: Lene Børglum; Rachel Dik Dukes; Alex Gayner
- Cinematography: Darius Khondji; Diego García
- Editors: Annie Guidice; Matthew Newman
- Camera setup: Single-camera
- Running time: 31-97 minutes
- Production companies: Space Rocket; Picrow

Original release
- Network: Amazon Prime Video
- Release: June 14, 2019

Too Old to Die Young is an American crime drama miniseries directed by Nicolas Winding Refn, written by Refn, Ed Brubaker and Halley Gross, and starring Miles Teller and Augusto Aguilera. It premiered on Amazon on June 14, 2019.

Amazon said in 2019 that they did not intend to produce a second season.

== Premise ==
Too Old to Die Young follows "a grieving police officer who, along with the man who shot his partner, finds himself in an underworld filled with working-class hit men, Yakuza soldiers, cartel assassins sent from Mexico, Russian mafia captains and gangs of teenage killers."

== Cast and characters ==
=== Main ===
- Miles Teller as Martin Jones
- Augusto Aguilera as Jesus Rojas
- Cristina Rodlo as Yaritza
- Nell Tiger Free as Janey Carter
- John Hawkes as Viggo Larsen
- Jena Malone as Diana DeYoung

=== Recurring ===
- William Baldwin as Theo Carter
- Callie Hernandez as Amanda
- Babs Olusanmokun as Damian
- Celestino Cornielle as Celestino
- Hart Bochner as Lieutenant
- Carlotta Montanari as Magdalena
- Chris Coppola as Melvin Redmond
- Joanna Cassidy as Eloise
- Manuel Uriza as Alfonso
- Roberto Aguire as Miguel
- Maxine Bahns as Rebecca Gilkins
- James Urbaniak as Stevie Crockett
- Brad Hunt as Rob Crockett
- Roger Lim as Korean Businessman
- Mak Takano as Yakuza Boss
- Hideo Kojima as Assassin
- Callan Mulvey as Keith Redford
- Lance Gross as Larry
- Ethan Flower as Greg

== Episodes ==
| No. | Title | Directed by | Written by | Original release date |
|---|---|---|---|---|
| 1 | "Volume 1: The Devil" | Nicolas Winding Refn | Nicolas Winding Refn & Ed Brubaker | June 14, 2019 |
Los Angeles police officer Larry is shot dead while taking a selfie for his mistress, Amanda. His partner Martin Jones hides the picture from the police and instead shows it to gang leader Damian, who identifies the killer as Jesus Rojas, whose mother Martin killed. In exchange for their silence, they pressure Martin into killing a man for them. Martin has dinner with the rich father of his 16-year-old girlfriend, Janey, who seems to approve of the relationship. In private, though, he acts bizarrely with Martin, imitating a tiger and making sexual advances toward him. After more coercion from Damian, Martin decides to do what he's asked. He tracks his target down to a car shop. After a fight with the man, who is naked, Martin kills him. At Larry's memorial service, where police serve orange juice and pancakes, Martin is promoted to the homicide division. Damian's gang captures Amanda, claiming she tried to sell Martin out to the Mexicans. They offer him a gun and the opportunity to deal with her as he wants. We are not shown what he does, aside from accepting the gun. Outside, he messages Janey.
| 2 | "Volume 2: The Lovers" | Nicolas Winding Refn | Nicolas Winding Refn & Ed Brubaker | June 14, 2019 |
Jesus escapes to Mexico to wait it out while things calm down in Los Angeles. His uncle, the terminally ill Don Ricardo, highly revered Rojas's mother, who he sees in her son. He also sees her in his nurse, Yaritza, whom he says he found out in the desert. A mysterious vigilante is killing cartel members, making matters tense with the police. Don Ricardo is also worried about whether his son, Miguel, is suited to take over. When Don Ricardo dies, Miguel beats up Jesus out of jealousy. He later severely abuses a prostitute before making Yaritza drive her off to be sold. At the exchange, Yaritza instead kills everyone and frees the girl, revealing herself as the vigilante. Jesus and Miguel later make peace, with Jesus helping him to execute several policemen. When he is about to kill the local chief, the scene cuts out, similarly to with Martin and Amanda.
| 3 | "Volume 3: The Hermit" | Nicolas Winding Refn | Nicolas Winding Refn & Ed Brubaker | June 14, 2019 |
Diana DeYoung is a victim's advocate who moonlights as a healer and appears to have magical powers. She has Viggo Larsen, a one-eyed former FBI agent who is terminally ill, murder pedophiles she learns about through her work. One of the murders goes wrong, and the body is found in a car in a parking lot. Martin, who has just started working homicide, is put on the case. He seems at unease with his middle-aged colleagues, who pull practical jokes on each other and openly celebrate fascism. When Martin finally tracks down Larsen, he does not arrest him. Instead he invites him to a diner, where they find they have a lot in common.
| 4 | "Volume 4: The Tower" | Nicolas Winding Refn | Nicolas Winding Refn & Ed Brubaker | June 14, 2019 |
Martin and Larsen begin working together to murder pedophiles for Diana. After one successful job, Larsen monologues about how humans used to have to be animals to survive. As civilization evolved, the animal side stayed beside us. He thinks society is about to collapse due to global warming and rising fascism. The instinctual violent side of humans will come back. He believes it's up to them to protect the innocence in humanity as much as they can. Influenced by his mentor, Martin begins to question the killings he is doing for Damian's gang. He is asked to kill a Korean man, and unsuccessfully tries to learn why from his employers. From the man himself, Martin learns he owes them $8,000. After he manages to get Martin the money, Damian agrees to let him live. Martin requests that he only be given the worst possible people to kill. Damian suggests two infamous porn directors.
| 5 | "Volume 5: The Fool" | Nicolas Winding Refn | Nicolas Winding Refn & Ed Brubaker | June 14, 2019 |
Martin stalks the pornographers. Eventually they stop to drink at a bar, where he casually gets to know them. They suggest he make a movie with him in it. As they are about to take off his clothes, Martin shoots everyone in the room dead. He goes through the studio looking for the rest before giving up and getting in his car. The two remaining pornographers get into an electric car to chase him, but have trouble keeping up. As dawn breaks, the car runs out of power. Martin backs up into them and kills one of them. As he is about to shoot the other, he mentions a girl who's going to die out in the desert, mistakenly believing Martin is after her. The director takes Martin to the desert, where they dig up a chest containing a chained girl. The director frees her, warning her about Martin in Spanish. He draws a knife and lunges at Martin, who shoots him dead. As Martin helps the girl out of the chest, she grabs the knife and stabs him in the side before running off.
| 6 | "Volume 6: The High Priestess" | Nicolas Winding Refn | Nicolas Winding Refn & Ed Brubaker | June 14, 2019 |
Yaritza and Jesus marry and decide to return to Los Angeles. In preparation, they arrange to have Damian killed, but the wrong man is hit. Jesus humiliates his subordinate for the failure. Later, Yaritza goes to a party arranged by one of Jesus's friends from before Mexico. She ends up playing a guessing game with Janey, which Janey loses when she incorrectly guesses that Yaritza is lying about killing 23 people. For winning, Yaritza is allowed to slap Janey, which she does more than once, even pushing her to the floor and putting her foot on her. Back home, Yaritza tells Jesus that she is his mother reincarnated. Jesus seems to accept this, and calls her his mother as he moves to perform oral sex on her.
| 7 | "Volume 7: The Magician" | Nicolas Winding Refn | Nicolas Winding Refn & Ed Brubaker | June 14, 2019 |
Martin has taken sick leave after being stabbed. He spends his free time celebrating Janey's 18th birthday and killing more pedophiles with Larsen. Theo, Janey's father, makes more sexual advances toward Martin when they are alone. He ends up inviting Martin to his home theater to watch a pornographic movie, which appears similar to the show itself. Afterwards, Theo starts masturbating while talking about Janey, causing Martin to kill him. Larsen helps Martin get rid of the body. Martin then throws up and confesses who Theo was to Larsen, and admits that he isn't sure why he killed him. He says he doesn't want to be a police officer anymore. Larsen and Martin visit Damian's gang to cut ties with them, only to find everyone dead and Damian's severed hands. Somewhere else, Jesus describes to a captive Damian all the ways he is going to torture him. Damian suggests that Jesus instead kill him quickly in exchange for telling him who actually killed his mother. Surprised, Jesus agrees, and Damian tells him about Martin. Yaritza kills Damian as he laughs hysterically.
| 8 | "Volume 8: The Hanged Man" | Nicolas Winding Refn | Nicolas Winding Refn & Ed Brubaker | June 14, 2019 |
The police perform a bizarre nationalistic play about Jesus to Martin as goodbye. Meanwhile, Janey reports her father missing, and admits to the police that she's been in a relationship with Martin since she was 16. Martin kills another pedophile with Larsen, who is getting too sick to continue the work. When Martin helps him to bed, Larsen asks him to hold him. They embrace for a long time. Janey and Martin go to the beach, when Jesus' men arrive, killing Janey and capturing Martin. Yaritza continues to secretly kill cartel members. She asks the women she frees to spread word of "the High Priestess of Death." Yaritza and Jesus engage in sadomasochistic sex, with Yaritza playing the dominant role. After torturing Martin for three days, Jesus decapitates him.
| 9 | "Volume 9: The Empress" | Nicolas Winding Refn | Nicolas Winding Refn & Ed Brubaker & Halley Gross | June 14, 2019 |
After Martin's death, Diana has a vision, with her eyes clouding over. She performs a ritual with lemon-flavored soda, which reveals Yaritza to her and clears her eyes. Meanwhile, Yaritza and Jesus role-play scenes from his childhood, acting out an incestuous relationship between him and his mother. At a meeting with his subordinates, Jesus orders his men to be as brutal and violent as possible, saying he wants to turn the city into "a theme park of pain." Larsen's mother eats his artificial eye while he is sleeping. Later he finds her dead with his eye by her side. He puts it back into his socket. Larsen later tells Diana that he needs to take his anger out somewhere. She tells him about a camp of pedophiles, but worries he won't come back if she sends him. While she is waiting for him at a diner, Diana tells her waiter about an older version of the story of Little Red Riding Hood. In this version, the wolf rapes Red Riding Hood instead of eating her, and the next day Red Riding Hood comes back armed and kills the wolf. Larsen returns safely, and the two eat apple pie together.
| 10 | "Volume 10: The World" | Nicolas Winding Refn | Nicolas Winding Refn & Halley Gross | June 14, 2019 |
Diana masturbates while using VR equipment, shaves her legs, calls in sick to work, and dances. She prophesies that civilization will soon end and evil will prosper until things reach a breaking point, after which she will declare "the dawn of innocence." Yaritza visits a bar, where she drinks with a gangster. She asks the girls to play the song about the High Priestess of Death that's been going around. When asked why she requested the song, Yaritza replies by killing all the men in the bar except one. As he begs for mercy, she declares that she will rid the world of evil and kills him.

== Production ==
=== Development ===
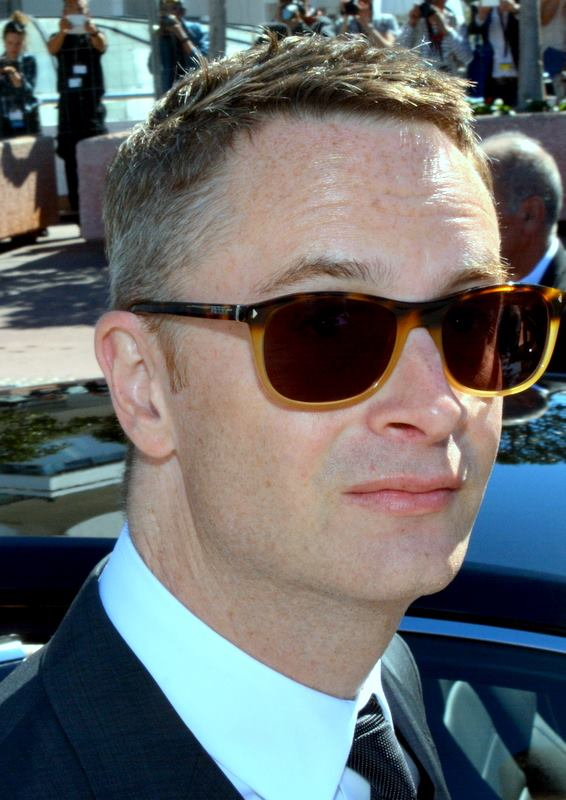
Nicolas Winding Refn directed every episode of the series.

On February 8, 2017, it was announced that Amazon had given the production a series order for a first season consisting of ten episodes. The series was slated to be written by Nicolas Winding Refn and Ed Brubaker both of whom were also set to executive produce alongside Jeffrey Stott. Additionally, Refn was expected to direct every episode of the series and Rachel Dik and Alexander H. Gayner were set to serve as producers.

=== Casting ===
On March 27, 2017, it was announced that Miles Teller had been cast in the series lead role of Martin, a character described as "a police officer entangled in the world of assassins." On November 21, 2017, the rest of the main cast was announced and included Billy Baldwin, Jena Malone, John Hawkes, Cristina Rodlo, Augusto Aguilera, Nell Tiger Free, Babs Olusanmokun, and Callie Hernandez. On February 7, 2018, it was reported that Hart Bochner had joined the series in a recurring capacity. On August 29, 2018, Refn announced through his official Twitter account that George Payne had been cast in the series.

=== Filming ===
On November 27, 2017, principal photography for the series began in Los Angeles, California. Filming for the first episode ended on January 17, 2018. On March 6, 2018, filming for an episode began in Albuquerque, New Mexico, and was expected to continue there through March before returning to Los Angeles. On August 11, 2018, principal photography for the series ended.

=== Soundtrack ===
Cliff Martinez composed the score for the series, his fourth collaboration with Nicolas Winding Refn. Like previous works of Winding Refn, the series also features a variety of electronic music and punk rock by bands like Goldfrapp, The Leather Nun, Frankie Miller and Jimmie Angel. A soundtrack album featuring Martinez's score as well as pre-existing pop music featured in the show was released on June 14, 2019.

== Release ==
On February 28, 2018, a series of first look images from the series were released. Episodes four and five of the series premiered out of competition at the 2019 Cannes Film Festival on May 18. On May 21, 2018, Refn released the first teaser trailer through his personal Twitter account. The full series premiered on Amazon Prime Video on June 14 of the same year.

=== Reception ===
Rotten Tomatoes tracked the series at an approval rating of 72% based on 39 reviews. The site's critical consensus is, "Grim and graphic, Too Old to Die Young is stylish, but its languid story does little to justify its violent tendencies – though fans of Refn's may find enjoyment in its neon laden misery." Metacritic aggregated a weighted average score of 55% based on 8 critical reviews, indicating “mixed or average reviews”.

Eric Kohn of IndieWire offered praise of the series, writing: "there’s certainly some potential in Too Old to Die Young, at least for audiences who can appreciate aspects of Refn’s dark style and punkish sensibility." Peter Bradshaw of The Guardian gave the episodes 4 out of a possible 5 stars, stating: "Too Old To Die Young is macabre, and nauseating in many ways, but very well made and very watchable."
