= The Fix (2026 film) =

American action film

- Theatrical release poster
- Directed by: Guy Moshe
- Screenplay by: Guy Moshe; Mark Bacci
- Produced by: Guy Moshe; Marina Grasic; Matthew G. Zamias; Wendy Sweetmore; Justin Oberman
- Starring: Zachary Levi; Liam Neeson; Annet Mahendru; Grant Harvey; Augusto Aguilera; Elnaaz Norouzi
- Cinematography: Larry Smith
- Edited by: Daniel Dor; Guy Moshe
- Music by: Federico Bisozzi; Davide Tomat
- Production companies: Astral Future; Latigo Films; Dreamtime Films
- Distributed by: Briarcliff Entertainment; Inaugural Entertainment
- Release date: September 11, 2026
- Running time: 141 minutes
- Country: United States
- Language: English
- Box office: $1 million

The Fix is a 2026 American action film directed by Guy Moshe and starring Liam Neeson, Zachary Levi, and Elnaaz Norouzi.

The Fix was released in the United States on September 11, 2026.

== Premise ==
Tucker reunites with his former agency mentor Larry, who is suffering from severe cognitive decline and memory issues, which causes him to accidentally blurt out classified secrets from his past overseas assignments. He lets slip to Tucker that more than four decades earlier, during the 1981 embassy crisis, he helped hide $25 million inside a hotel wall in Tehran, Iran.

Tucker sees a chance to score a huge payday, so he reassembles his old squad for a rogue, highly illegal heist mission into Iran. However, getting the money out proves incredibly difficult. But before they can get out of Iran, the team uncovers a group of women suffering under the regime. The squad must decide whether to walk away with the money or risk their lives to orchestrate a daring rescue operation.

== Cast ==
- Liam Neeson as Larry
- Zachary Levi as Tucker
- Annet Mahendru as Sophie
- Grant Harvey as Matt
- Augusto Aguilera as Bruce
- Elnaaz Norouzi as Zara, the cover wife for Tucker and a honeypot
- Wes Chatham as Alex
- Despina Mirou as Katarina
- Navid Negahban as IRGC officer
- Oliver Trevena as Colonel Wilkes
- Lara Wolf as Maryam, the journalist, photographer and activist to be rescued

== Production ==
The film is based on an original idea by former CIA Intelligence Special Operations Group Officer Bazzel Baz and is directed by Guy Moshe who wrote the script with Mark Bacci. Oakhurst Entertainment is financing for whom Marina Grasic is producing alongside Matthew G. Zamias for Astral Future, as well as Wendy Sweetmore of Dreamtime Films and Moshe. Baz is among the executive producers. The film also includes ex-special forces and government intelligence operatives amongst the production team involved in the coordination of action sequences and helping with the modus operandi of the CIA overseas operations.

Zachary Levi joined the cast in January 2024. Liam Neeson joined the cast in May 2024.

Principal photography took place in Mississippi in September 2024. Filming locations include Millsaps College in Jackson, Mississippi.

In June 2025, it was revealed that Lara Wolf had joined the cast.

== Release ==
The Fix was acquired by Inaugural Entertainment, who previously had distributed Levi's Not Without Hope. Formerly titled Hotel Tehran, it was released in the United States on September 11, 2026.

== Reception ==
=== Critical response ===
On the review aggregator website Rotten Tomatoes, 19% of 26 critics' reviews are positive, with an average rating of 4.3/10. Metacritic, which uses a weighted average, assigned the film a score of 37 out of 100, based on seven critics, indicating "generally unfavorable" reviews. Audiences polled by CinemaScore gave the film an average grade of "B" on an A+ to F scale.
