= Augusto Aguilera =

Ecuadorian-American actor (born 1987)

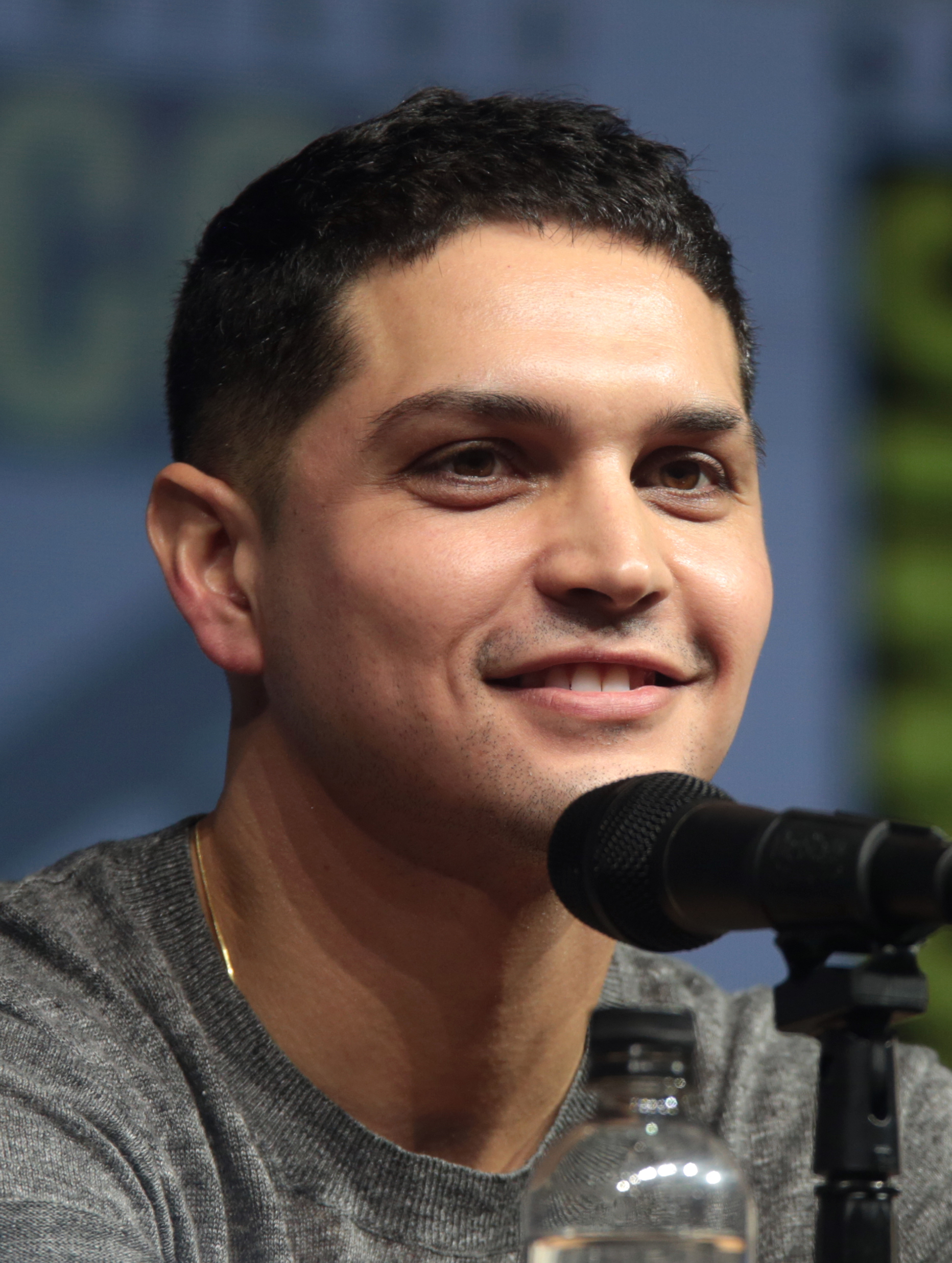
- Aguilera at the 2018 San Diego Comic-Con
- Born: October 16, 1987 (age 38); Guayaquil, Ecuador
- Occupation: Actor
- Years active: 2008–present

Augusto Aguilera Fócil is an Ecuadorian-American actor, best known for his roles in The Predator and Too Old to Die Young.

== Life and career ==
Aguilera grew up in Los Angeles, California, and began his serious acting career at the Actors Circle Theatre when he was twenty. He eventually made the transition to acting on film which he found "strange" to begin with. "I've heard that theatre is an actor's medium, film a director's, TV a writer's. Initially, I believed collaboration only came in film and theatre. Now I know it's on the director...With theatre there are no safety nets. It's an emotional marathon." He joined the cast of Chasing Life and made an appearance in Snowfall. In 2018, Aguilera co-starred in The Predator, opposite big-name stars such as Sterling K. Brown, Boyd Holbrook, Trevante Rhodes, Keegan-Michael Key and Olivia Munn. His character, Nettles, was described as the "heart" of the team. Aguilera stated that he would watch and roleplay the original Predator film.

== Filmography ==
=== Film ===
Year	Title	Role	Notes
2008	8	Lender	Segment: "Person to Person"
2010	Brown Bag Diaries: Ridin' the Blinds in B Minor	Johnny	Short film
2017	The Fifth Man	Mr. K	Short film
2018	The Predator	Nettles	
2026	The Fix	Bruce	

=== Television ===
Year	Title	Role	Notes
2011	The Cynical Life of Harper Hall	Sunny	3 episodes
2012	Geo's Pizza	Customer #3	Episode: "The Mexican"
2014–2015	Chasing Life	Kieran	Recurring role
2015	Major Crimes	Pablo Mendoza	Episode: "Internal Affairs"
2016	Criminal Minds: Beyond Borders	Javier Garcia	Episode: "The Ballad of Nick and Nat"
2016	Ice	Chuy	Episode: "Hyenas"
2016	Citizen	Julio	TV pilot
2017	Grey's Anatomy	Mr. Endris	Episode: "Civil War"
2017	Snowfall	Pedro Nava	Episode: "2016 Original Pilot"
2019	Too Old To Die Young	Jesus Rojas	Main role; 7 episodes
2021	Made for Love	Liver	2 episodes
2022	Promised Land	Mateo Flores	Main role; 10 episodes
2023	The Last Thing He Told Me	Grady Bradford	Main role; 7 episodes
2025	I Love LA	Andrew	3 episodes
