= Katya Martín =

Spanish American actress and writer

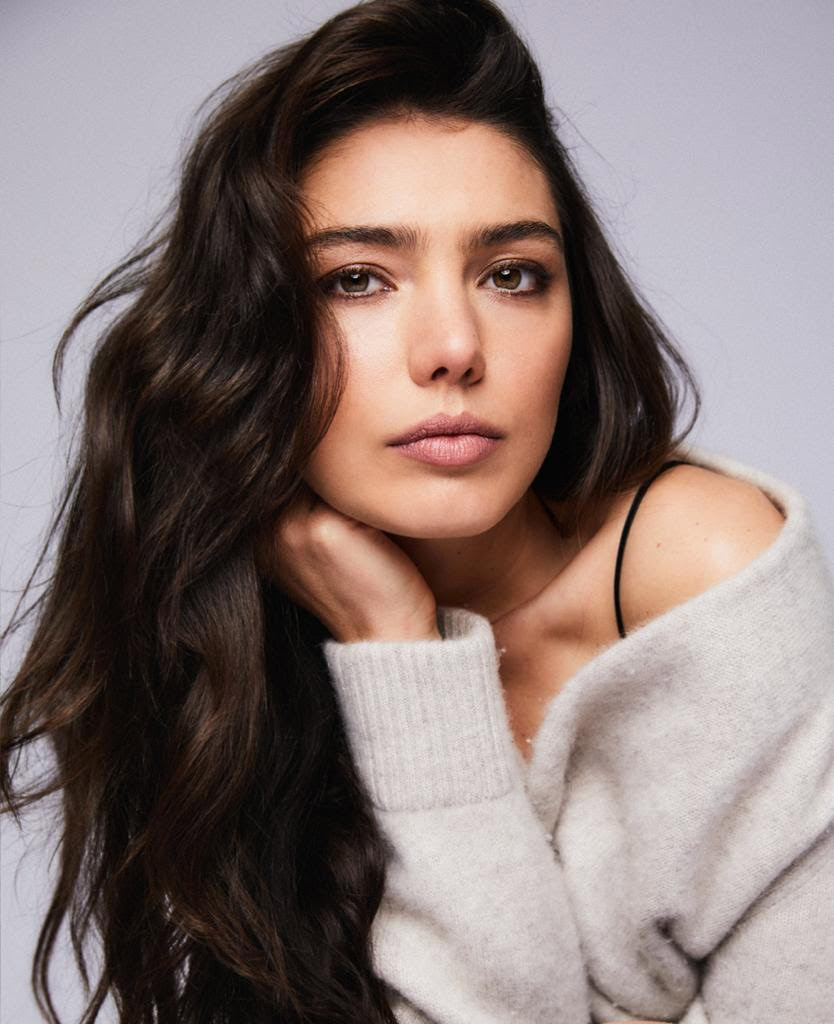
- Katya Martín in 2022
- Born: Katya Martín Gullans
- Education: New York University
- Occupations: Actress, producer, director, writer
- Years active: 2013–present

Katya Martín (born Katya Martín Gullans) is a Spanish-American actor, producer, writer and director. She is best known for her portrayal of Juana Sánchez in the ABC's family drama television series Promised Land, and has been featured as guest star in shows as MGM+'s Godfather of Harlem, BBC One's Roadkill as well as Showtime's The Affair. In 2022, it was announce that Martín was the lead role in the Indie Feature Film, The Death That Awaits.

== Early life ==
Martín was born in Southern California, but grew up in Valencia, Spain. She speaks Spanish, English, French, and Italian and reflects a new generation of multicultural and multilingual artist in the United States. In 2015, Martín was chosen as one of 14 actors from a pool of over 3,000 to be a part of ABC Discovers: Talent Showcase, and it was featured in a presentation that took place at the New World Stages in New York City.

== Other projects ==
Besides her acting career, Martín has also ventured into producing, writing, and directing, creating videos and branded content for a range of organizations including Vogue, Red Bull, Target, Credo Beauty, Alvin Ailey American Dance Theater, The Brooklyn Museum, and CLAIM. Her collaboration with Alvin Ailey to commemorate International Women's Day and Judy Chicago's art installation, The Dinner Party was highlighted in Elle magazine.

== Selected filmography ==
Film roles
Year	Title	Role	Notes
2015	My First Miracle	Angelica	Main Role

Television roles
Year	Title	Role	Notes
2018	The Affair	Lily	Episode: Episode 10
2020	Roadkill	Zoe Downs	Episode: Episode 2
2022	Promised Land	Juana Sánchez	Main role
2022	Big Sky	Skylar Sharpe	Episode: "A Thin Layer of Rock"
2023	Godfather of Harlem	Marina	Episode: "Angel of Death"
