= WWE Hall of Fame (2022) =

Professional wrestling induction event

- Promotion: WWE
- Date: April 1, 2022
- City: Dallas, Texas
- Venue: American Airlines Center

WWE Hall of Fame chronology
← Previous; 2021	Next → 2023

The 2022 WWE Hall of Fame was a professional wrestling event produced by WWE that featured the induction of the 23rd class into the WWE Hall of Fame. The ceremony took place on April 1, 2022, at the American Airlines Center in Dallas, Texas, the night preceding WrestleMania 38. It aired live at 10pm Eastern Time on Peacock in the United States and the WWE Network internationally, immediately after the airing of WWE's regular Friday night program, SmackDown. The event was headlined by the induction of The Undertaker into the WWE Hall of Fame.

== Background ==
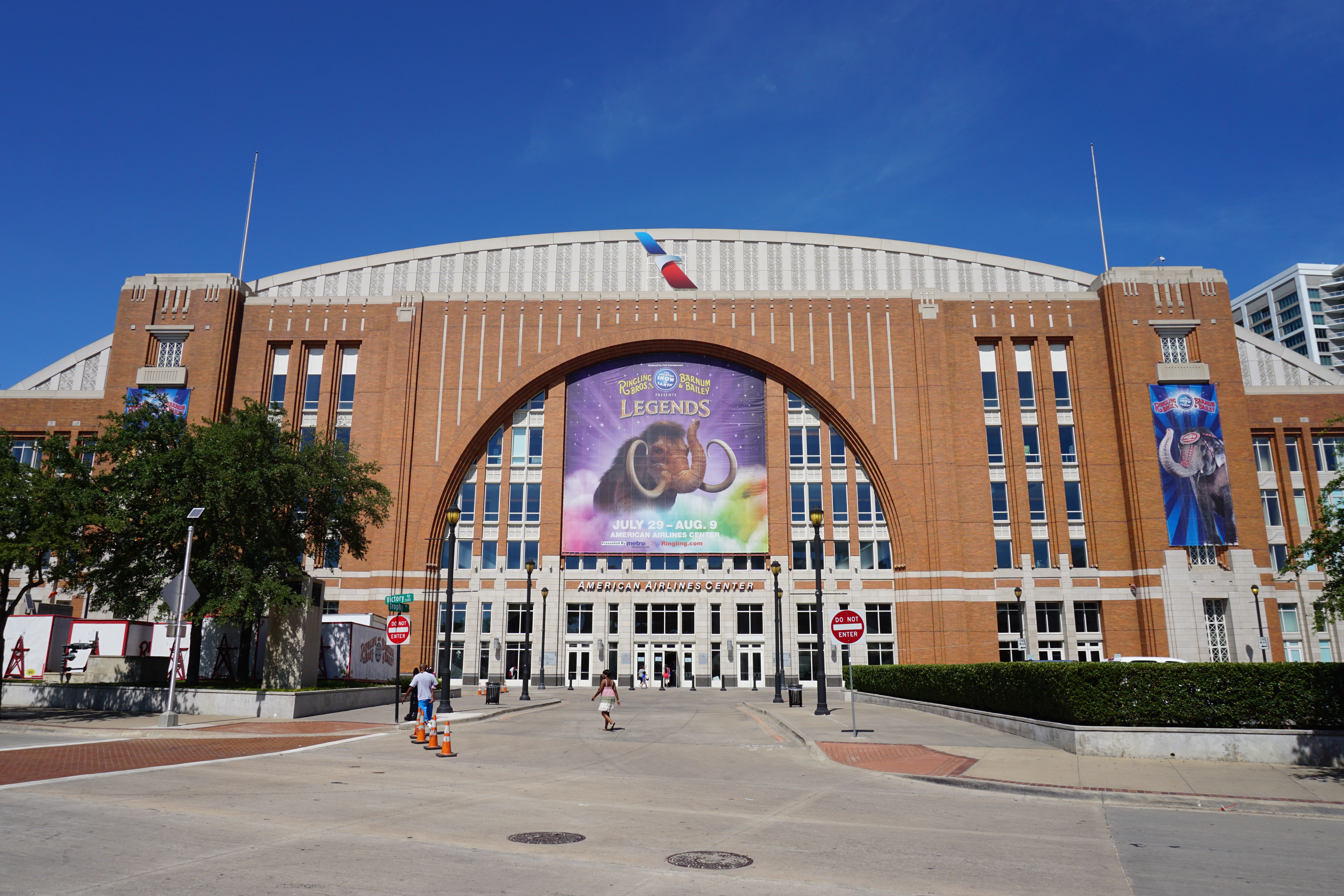
The event was held at the American Airlines Center in Dallas, Texas.

The 2022 WWE Hall of Fame was scheduled to be held on April 1, 2022, at the American Airlines Center in Dallas Texas, the night before WrestleMania 38. The ceremony was announced to take place live at 10pm Eastern Time, immediately after the airing of WWE's Friday night program, SmackDown. It aired on Peacock in the United States and the WWE Network in international markets. On February 18, 2022, The Undertaker was announced as the first individual inductee for the WWE Hall of Fame Class of 2022. The news was responded to with extensive praise from WWE fans, the professional wrestling community, and media outlets alike.

In the week following the heavily publicized Undertaker inductee news, media outlets observed that many WWE fans had advocated for the idea of The Undertaker to be the sole inductee for the Class of 2022, reasoning that his legend status in the company would warrant such an honor. The solo dedication was also publicly endorsed by fellow Hall of Famer Bubba Ray Dudley, Class of 2018, sharing as well of his opinion that such an event would be an entertainment draw and sell out the arena.

The character of "The Undertaker" was created by WWE Chairman and Chief Executive Officer Vince McMahon, who made a rare media appearance on The Pat McAfee Show on March 3, where he announced that he would be inducting The Undertaker into the WWE Hall of Fame. In praising The Undertaker both inside and outside of character in a heartfelt message, McMahon elaborated that this induction would be one of the most difficult endeavors of his life because of his longtime history with The Undertaker, what they had been through together, and how close they had been behind the scenes. Reacting to the heavily publicized announcement from McMahon, The Undertaker issued a Twitter response later that same day, which read:

After over 30 years of long roads traveled, countless hours of TV, and one hell of a ride together... couldn't think of anyone better to put me in the #WWEHOF than @VinceMcMahon. One final ride together, old-timer!!!

— The Undertaker

On March 7, Bleacher Report and WWE announced that Vader would be inducted into the WWE Hall of Fame Class of 2022 posthumously. On March 14, Complex.com and WWE announced that Queen Sharmell would be inducted into the Class of 2022. The announcement of Sharmell's induction was met with widespread mixed reactions as fans either reacted positively to the news while others criticized the choice citing her lack of credentials within WWE and World Championship Wrestling (WCW).

On March 25, FoxSports.com and WWE announced that former WWE wrestler Shad Gaspard would be receiving the Warrior Award posthumously, with his wife Siliana and son Aryeh accepting the award. On March 28, David Shoemaker of The Ringer and WWE announced that The Steiner Brothers (Scott Steiner and Rick Steiner) would be inducted into the WWE Hall of Fame Class of 2022. For the first time in 6 years, no Legacy Wing inductions took place.

With an unprecedented induction that displayed his various Deadman genres on mannequins, Calaway's speech opened with a 5-minute, emotional standing ovation from the live audience that brought Calaway to tears. Calaway's speech, hailed by media outlets as matchless and beyond compare, shared his collection of life philosophies for success.

== Inductees ==
=== Individual ===
- Class headliners appear in **boldface**

Image	Ring name (Birth name)	Inducted by	WWE recognized accolades
	**The Undertaker** (Mark Calaway)	Vince McMahon	Four-time WWF/WWE (Heavyweight) Champion; Three-time World Heavyweight Champion; One-time WWF Hardcore Champion; Six-time WWF Tag Team Champion; One-time WCW Tag Team Champion; 2007 Royal Rumble winner 15-time Slammy Award winner Tuwaiq Mountain Trophy winner Widely known for The Streak, a series of 21 victories at WrestleMania, with an overall record of 25–2, and being the longest tenured WWE wrestler, totaling 30 years.
	Vader (Leon White)	Jesse White	Posthumous inductee: represented by his widow Debra and his son Jesse. Three-time WCW World Heavyweight Champion; One-time WCW United States Heavyweight Champion; 1993 Battlebowl winner.
	Queen Sharmell (Sharmell Sullivan-Huffman)	Booker T	1991 Miss Black America; Former Nitro Girl, and manager in WCW and WWE, most famously of her husband, Booker T.

=== Group ===
Image	Ring names (Birth name)	Inducted by	WWE recognized accolades as a team
Scott (left) and Rick (right) posing with a fan.	The Steiner Brothers	Bron Breakker	Two-time WWF Tag Team Champions; Two-time IWGP Tag Team Champions; Seven-time WCW World Tag Team Champions; One-time WCW United States Tag Team Champions.
Scott Steiner (Scott Rechsteiner) – One-time WCW World Heavyweight Champion, two-time WCW World Television Champion, and two-time WCW United States Heavyweight Champion. Rick Steiner (Robert Rechsteiner) – Three-time WCW World Television Champion, one-time WCW United States Heavyweight Champion, one-time WCW World Tag Team Champion (without Scott), and one-time WCW United States Tag Team Champion (without Scott).

=== Warrior Award ===
Image	Recipient (Birth name)	Presented by	Notes
	Shad Gaspard	Dana Warrior	Posthumous recipient: represented by his widow Siliana and his son Aryeh. Former WWE wrestler in the Cryme Tyme tag team with JTG; Gaspard sacrificed himself to save his son from drowning in 2020.
