= Christopher Oscar Peña =

Christopher Oscar Peña is a playwright, screenwriter, actor and educator who resides in New York City. He teaches theater at NYU's Tisch School of Arts and is a member of the Playwrights Unit at Goodman Theatre in Chicago. He also has had work commissioned by Yale Repertory Theatre. Peña co-wrote one episode of the TV series, Jane the Virgin in 2010. He was on the "Future Broadway Power List," by Backstage (magazine) in 2014.

== Personal life ==
Peña was born in San Jose, California.. His parents emigrated from Honduras.

He received his B.A. in Dramatic Arts from the University of California, Santa Barbara and his M.F.A. in Dramatic Writing from the Tisch School of the Arts at NYU.

== Career ==
As a playwright, Peña has produced a large number of plays, some of which have been produced all over the United States and in the UK. Peña's plays include Maelstrom, Icarus Burns, Alone Above A Raging Sea, L(y)re, The Suicide Tapes and Awe/Struck. His work has been developed or seen in theaters in New York, Chicago and Los Angeles such as: The Public Theater, INTAR Theatre, LAByrinth Theater Company, Goodman Theatre, Theater for the New City, Son of Semele Theater and more. As part of the T.S. Eliot US/UK Exchange in 2011, Peña attended the premiere of his play However Long The Night at The Old Vic. In 2013, Peña's play Tiny People (or, it gets better) was a finalist for both the O'Neill Playwrights Conference and the Sundance Theatre Lab, and was selected to feature at the Crossing Borders Festival. His play, A Cautionary Tail premiered at The Flea Theater where every performance sold out and the production was extended twice. In 2014, he co-produced his first play in Chicago, with Melissa Lusk called I Wonder If Its Possible For a Love Affair To Last Forever? Or Things I Found On Craigslist, which premiered at the University of Illinois at Chicago. Peña is a recipient of the Norman Corwin Award for excellence in audio theatre.

As a screenwriter, Peña created and is the co-star of the web series 80/20, which focuses on viewing sexuality as a spectrum. 80/20 was selected for the 2013 New Media Film Festival and the 2015 Outfest Web Series: In With The New Out. The web series also won the 2013 LAWEBFEST Outstanding Achievement writing award. Peña co-wrote one episode of the Golden Globe nominated TV show, Jane the Virgin, on The CW.

Peña's works frequently focus on stories that deal with bicultural identities, sexuality, and growing up in the modern world. A Latino himself, Peña works closely with culturally diverse theaters like The Lark Playwright Workshop, US/UK Exchange, INTAR'S Hispanic Playwrights Lab, Diverse City Theater Company and New York Theatre Workshop, where he was named an Emerging Artist of Color Fellow. Through these relationships, he works to represent a variety of cultural and sexual populations in theater. In 2012, Peña performed at the INTAR Producing Latino Voices in English Festival; while In 2009, he won the Latino Playwrights Award from The John F. Kennedy Center for the Performing Arts for his work, Maelstrom.

Peña's work is published by NoPassport Press and Smith and Kraus.

== View of theatre ==
Peña writes to understand the many issues he grapples with in everyday life. He believes a play should make the audience both feel surprised and think of the world from a new perspective. One play that stood out to him was Angels in America due to its use of metaphors. This was different from the realistic plays that he had read earlier and it made him realize that realism was the not the only form of theatre.

Peña often writes about Asian characters because of his experience growing up around Vietnamese people in the Bay Area. To him, "Asian-Americans are a part of [his] cultural identity" and therefore should be a part of his work. He doesn't believe that Latinx playwrights should be forced to write plays about "immigration, drug cartels, and the working class" because not every Latinx individual shares those experiences. For this reason he has received questions about what makes a play "Latinx" and has had a hard time at some theatres putting on his plays.

Peña does not take notes in order to write his plays but instead thinks of writing as a bucket of water; it continues to fill with water as he interacts more with his environment and experiences different things daily and when it's full, it spills and that is when he begins to write. He has written plays over the course of 4–6 days this way: "When the writing comes it comes." He sees the fact that you can be vulnerable for people like an actor but avoid being in front of them on stage; which is what he loves.

== Notable plays ==
=== A Cautionary Tale ===
The play follows two Chinese-American siblings who are academically very successful at their high school and all about work and no play due to the strong presence of their Chinese mother in their lives. The Chinese mother expects perfection from her children and denounces their actions when they try and act like their American friends. Aside from clashes between American culture and Chinese culture, the play also tackles issues of race (the daughter is dating someone who is African-American) and sexuality (the son is gay). Peña was glad to see the play put on by The Flea and has said the actors represent both "New York, [and] what America looks like to [him]." The play has been positively reviewed by many critics.

=== Awe/Struck ===
"Denia arrives in Chicago, looking to create a place for herself in this unfamiliar land. Monique's never left Chicago but feels more and more like a stranger in her own home. A chance encounter between them transforms their lives forever in this new play about identity and perception." Peña has said that the inspiration for this play came from a terrible incident he saw in a newspaper one day. He has not clarified on the event. Reading about the event made him think about "What [it] means to be a good neighbor" and "how we can be good neighbors" in our local neighborhoods but also as countries that are next to each other. He has acknowledged, after the fact, that his personal loneliness from moving to Chicago, where he didn't know anyone, and his own questioning of what makes somewhere home, influenced the play and the development of his characters.

=== Icarus Burns ===
Peña states that this play is his response to the 2008 election, when former President Barack Obama took office, and California passed Proposition 8. This sparked questions, for him, of "what it means to be a person of color in the United States". The play takes place during the environment of the 2008 election where the political rhetoric of "hope and change [is] giving rise to dreams." The play focuses on the lives of six individuals who, because of this rhetoric, are hoping to go after their dreams but face obstacles that make it harder for them survive as part of marginalized communities. Key themes the play touches on are immigration, same-sex marriage, and domestic abuse.

== Works ==
=== Plays ===
- Maelstrom
- Icarus burns
- L(y)re
- However Long The Night
- The Suicide Tapes
- Awe/Struck
- A Cautionary Tale
- One of Us
- 5 Letter word
- TINY PEOPLE (or it gets better)
- Mnemonic
- Point of Reference
- How Should I Address You?

The strangers

- And Rain... And Rain... And Rain.
- X+Y=Z
- What Came after

=== TV shows and web series ===
Year	Title	Distributor
2013	80/20	N/A
2015	Jane the Virgin	The CW
2017–2018	Insecure	HBO
2019	Sweetbitter	Starz
2020	Motherland: Fort Salem	Freeform
2021	The Jenkins Family Christmas	Stargazer Global Media
2022	Promised Land	ABC
