= Randy Thornton =

American football player (born 1964)

No. 94, 58
- Positions: Defensive end, linebacker

Personal information
- Born: December 23, 1964 (age 61); New Orleans, Louisiana, U.S.
- Listed height: 6 ft 4 in (1.93 m)
- Listed weight: 250 lb (113 kg)

Career information
- High school: West Jefferson (New Orleans, Louisiana)
- College: Houston
- NFL draft: 1988: undrafted

Career history
- Denver Broncos (1988–1989); New York Giants (1990)*; Sacramento Surge (1992); Sacramento Gold Miners (1993)
- * Offseason or practice squad member only

Randall Thornton (born December 23, 1964) is an American former football player and professional wrestler. He is also known for his stint in World Championship Wrestling under the ring name Swoll.

== Football career ==
Thornton attended the University of Houston, where he played for the Houston Cougars as a defensive back and free safety between 1984 and 1987.

From 1988 to 1990, he was a member of the Denver Broncos as a linebacker. In 1990, he was sidelined with a knee injury. In 1990, he was also courted by the New York Giants. He left the Broncos in the same year without ever having played in a game.

He played for the Sacramento Surge of the World League of American Football in 1992.

In the 1993 CFL season, he played for the Sacramento Gold Miners as a defensive end.

== Professional wrestling career ==
Swoll
Personal information
- Born: Randall Thornton; December 23, 1964 (age 61)
- Education: University of Houston

Professional wrestling career
- Ring name: Swoll
- Billed height: 6 ft 7 in (2.01 m)
- Billed weight: 325 lb (147 kg; 23.2 st)
- Billed from: New Orleans, Louisiana, U.S.
- Trained by: Brad Rheingans
- Debut: May 3, 1991
- Retired: August 31, 1999

=== AWA and New Japan (1991) ===
Thornton trained as a wrestler under Brad Rheingans.

On May 3, 1991, he debuted in the American Wrestling Association, where he lost to Frank Andersson. That same month, he toured New Japan Pro-Wrestling and fought in a "Different Style Fight" against Shinya Hashimoto, which he lost in the second round. He would lose another Different Style Fight to Masashi Aoyagi in October 1991.

=== World Championship Wrestling (1999) ===
In 1999, Thornton, under the ring name Swoll, debuted in World Championship Wrestling as a member of Master P's No Limit Soldiers. The Soldiers immediately began a feud with the West Texas Rednecks due to the Rednecks' hatred of rap music. On June 13, 1999, at The Great American Bash, Swoll assisted fellow Soldiers Konnan and Rey Misterio Jr. in defeating the Rednecks' Curt Hennig and Bobby Duncum Jr. On the June 24 episode of Thunder, Swoll made his in-ring debut as he and B.A. defeated Disorderly Conduct (Mean Mike and Tough Tom). At Bash at the Beach, the Soldiers (Swoll, Konnan, B.A. and Misterio Jr.) defeated the Rednecks (Hennig, Duncum Jr. Barry Windham and Kendall Windham) in an elimination tag team match. After defeating a few other teams over the next few weeks, Swoll and B.A. lost to the Windhams on the August 3 episode of Saturday Night, thus ending both Swoll's undefeated streak and the feud between the Soldiers and the Rednecks. On the August 17 episode of Saturday Night, Swoll competed in his final match for WCW as he and B.A. defeated Hugh Morrus and Jerry Flynn via disqualification. Thornton retired from professional wrestling immediately afterwards.

== Retirement ==
After retiring from wrestling, Thornton began working for the American Center For Character and Cultural Education. He is a born again Christian and also speaks for the Fellowship of Christian Athletes.

== See also ==
- List of gridiron football players who became professional wrestlers
