= Teddy Reade =

American professional wrestler

Personal information
- Born: Theodore Reade

Professional wrestling career
- Ring name(s): 4x4 Cassius; Kash; Cash; Ted Reade; Teddy Reade
- Billed height: 6 ft 3 in (1.91 m)
- Billed weight: 400 lb (180 kg)
- Trained by: WCW Power Plant
- Debut: 1996
- Retired: 2008

Theodore Reade is an American professional wrestler who is known for his short-lived stint in World Championship Wrestling. As of 2013 Reade was working on the independent circuit.

== World Championship Wrestling ==
In 1999 Reade went under the ring name 4x4 and debuted in World Championship Wrestling as a member of Master P's No Limit Soldiers along with BA, Chase Tatum, Konnan, Rey Mysterio, Jr. and Swoll. They later feuded with The West Texas Rednecks due to the Rednecks hatred of rap music. After the soldiers broke up 4x4 changed his name to Cassius by joining a heel stable called Harlem Heat 2000 and acted as a bodyguard, the group, consisting of the leader Stevie Ray, Big T and manager J. Biggs, then began feuding with Booker T. although the feud didn't last long and Harlem Heat 2000 began to split up. After WCW, Reade worked in the independents mostly for Northeast Wrestling.

== Career outside professional wrestling ==
Reade has worked as a bodyguard for Mike Tyson, 50 Cent, Winky Wright, Robbie Keane and other celebrities.

== Championships and accomplishments ==
- Northeast Wrestling
  - Battle Royal winner (2008)
