= Bash at the Beach (1999) =

1999 World Championship Wrestling pay-per-view event

- Promotion: World Championship Wrestling
- Date: July 11, 1999
- City: Fort Lauderdale, Florida
- Venue: National Car Rental Center
- Attendance: 13,624
- Buy rate: 175,000
- Tagline: A Tidal Wave of Trash-Talkin', Body Slammin', Tsunami Fury.

Pay-per-view chronology
← Previous; The Great American Bash	Next → Road Wild

Bash at the Beach chronology
← Previous; 1998	Next → 2000

The 1999 Bash at the Beach was the sixth Bash at the Beach professional wrestling pay-per-view (PPV) event produced by World Championship Wrestling (WCW). The event took place on July 11, 1999, from the National Car Rental Center in Fort Lauderdale, Florida.

Nine matches were contested at the event, including one dark match. In the main event, Randy Savage and Sid Vicious defeated Kevin Nash and Sting for Nash's WCW World Heavyweight Championship, with Savage pinning Nash to win the title. In other prominent matches, Buff Bagwell defeated Roddy Piper in a boxing match, The Jersey Triad (Diamond Dallas Page, Chris Kanyon and Bam Bam Bigelow) defeated Chris Benoit and Perry Saturn in a handicap match to retain the WCW World Tag Team Championship, and Fit Finlay won the Junkyard Invitational.

== Storylines ==
The event featured wrestlers from pre-existing scripted feuds and storylines. Wrestlers portrayed villains, heroes, or less distinguishable characters in the scripted events that built tension and culminated in a wrestling match or series of matches.

== Event ==
Other on-screen personnel
Role:	Name:
Commentators	Tony Schiavone
Commentators	Bobby Heenan
Interviewers	Gene Okerlund
Interviewers	Mike Tenay
Ring announcers	Michael Buffer
Ring announcers	David Penzer
Referees	Randy Anderson
Referees	Johnny Boone
Referees	Mickie Jay
Referees	Nick Patrick
Referees	Charles Robinson
Referees	Billy Silverman

The main event was a tag team match for the WCW World Heavyweight Championship in which the person to score the deciding pinfall would win the title. The match pitted champion Kevin Nash and Sting against Randy Savage and Sid Vicious. Savage pinned Nash to win the title. Other featured matches on the card were Roddy Piper versus Buff Bagwell in a boxing match, The No Limit Soldiers (Konnan, Rey Misterio, Jr., Swoll, and B.A.) versus The West Texas Rednecks (Curt Hennig, Bobby Duncum Jr., Barry Windham, and Kendall Windham) in an elimination match and a Junkyard Invitational match, which took place in a junkyard and the match could only be won climbing over a chain link fence and escaping. Fit Finlay escaped the junkyard to win the match and the Hardcore Junkyard Invitational Trophy. At the end of the match Hak put Finlay in the trunk of a car and Jerry Flynn riding a forklift picked up the car. Finlay was able to get out of the trunk before Flynn could put the car in a smash compactor.

== Reception ==
In 2015, Kevin Pantoja of 411Mania gave the event a rating of 2.0 [Very Bad], stating, "Another bad show from WCW and they are especially bad from this era. The only match that is really worth anything was the Tag Team Title bout. The only other thing on this entire card to even crack two stars was the opener and that was based on pure entertainment over wrestling skill. I had to endure Swol, topless Piper, Rick Steiner vs. Van Hammer, US Champ David Flair and a damn Junkyard match. If I find a good WCW Pay-Per-View from their last two+ years, I'll be stunned."

== Results ==
No.	Results	Stipulations	Times
1^{D}	C.G. Afi and Jeremy Lopez defeated Jamie Howard and Jet Jaguar	Tag team match	—
2	Ernest Miller (with Sonny Onoo) defeated Disco Inferno	Singles match	08:07
3	Rick Steiner (c) defeated Van Hammer	Singles match for the WCW World Television Championship	03:05
4	David Flair (c) (with Ric Flair, Samantha, Asya, and Arn Anderson) defeated Dean Malenko	Singles match for the WCW United States Heavyweight Championship	03:05
5	The No Limit Soldiers (Konnan, Rey Misterio Jr., Swoll, and B.A.) defeated The West Texas Rednecks (Curt Hennig, Bobby Duncum Jr., Barry and Kendall Windham)	Elimination match	15:35
6	Fit Finlay won by escaping the junkyard (Note: Other participants in junkyard invitational: Ciclope, Jerry Flynn, Johnny Grunge, Hak, Horace Hogan, Brian Knobbs, Hugh Morrus, La Parka, Lord Steven Regal, Rocco Rock, Silver King, David Taylor and Mikey Whipwreck.)	Junkyard Invitational	13:51
7	The Jersey Triad (Diamond Dallas Page, Chris Kanyon, and Bam Bam Bigelow) (c) defeated Chris Benoit and Perry Saturn	Handicap match for the WCW World Tag Team Championship	23:16
8	Buff Bagwell (with Judy Bagwell) defeated Roddy Piper (with Ric Flair)	Boxing match with Mills Lane as special guest referee	6:36
9	Randy Savage and Sid Vicious (with Team Madness) defeated Kevin Nash (c) and Sting	Tag team match for the WCW World Heavyweight Championship; Savage became the champion by pinning Nash	13:20
(c) / – the champion(s) heading into the match; D / – this was a dark match

=== Eight-man tag team match eliminations ===
Elimination no.	Wrestler	Team	Eliminated by	Elimination move	Time
1	Bobby Duncum, Jr.	West Texas Rednecks	Swoll	Springboard leg drop by Mysterio	06:26
2	Brad Armstrong	No Limit Soldiers	Curt Hennig	Hennig-Plex	09:07
3	Kendall Windham	West Texas Rednecks	Konnan	DDT	10:52
4	Konnan and Barry Windham	No Limit Soldiers and West Texas Rednecks	N/A	Double count-out	13:05
5	Curt Hennig	West Texas Rednecks	Rey Mysterio, Jr.	Swan Dive from on top of Swoll's shoulders	15:35
Survivors:	Rey Mysterio, Jr. and Swoll (No Limit Soldiers)				
