= List of gridiron football players who became professional wrestlers =

The following is a list of gridiron football players who became professional wrestlers. People may appear on the list multiple times if they were signed to more than one league. For example, Clem Turner appears on the list five times because he was in five different leagues. Also, if someone's most common ring name is different than their real name, the ring name is listed in parentheses.

== National Football League ==
=== Played in regular season or postseason games ===
- Dick Afflis (Dick the Bruiser)
- Kay Bell
- Verlon Biggs
- Monty Brown
- Hank Bruder
- Bob Bruggers
- Lloyd Burdick
- Nick Campofreda
- Joe Carollo
- Don Chuy
- Darren Drozdov (Droz)
- Bobby Duncum
- A. J. Francis (Top Dolla)
- Russ Francis
- Bill Goldberg
- Kevin Greene
- Herman Hickman
- Ernie Holmes
- George Hultz
- Walter Johnson
- Adam "Pacman" Jones
- Don Joyce
- Alex Karras
- Bob Konovsky
- Nick Lassa
- Len Levy (Butch Levy)
- Gene Lipscomb
- Al Lolotai
- Gil Mains
- Tony Matisi
- Pat McAfee
- Dustin McDonald
- Mayes McLain
- Steve McMichael
- Art Michalik
- Ron Mikolajczyk
- Century Milstead
- Bronko Nagurski
- Leo Nomellini
- Quinn Ojinnaka (Moose)
- Brian Pillman
- Sabby Piscitelli (Tino Sabbatelli)
- Ron Pritchard
- Am Rascher
- Charley Robinson
- Bob Sapp
- Joe Savoldi
- Dan Sileo (Bonecrusher Sileo)
- Otis Sistrunk
- Gus Sonnenberg
- Don Stansauk (Hard Boiled Haggerty)
- Sammy Stein
- Frank Stojack
- Woody Strode
- Clem Turner
- Art White (Tarzan White)
- Reggie White
- Josh Wilcox
- Cy Williams
- DeAngelo Williams
- George Wilson
- Jim Wilson
- Lee Wykoff

=== Active roster but did not play ===
- Chad Fortune
- Nick McNeil (Percy Watson)
- Lester Speight (Rasta the Voodoo Man)

=== Offseason, practice squad, or injured reserve ===
- Jack Adkisson (Fritz Von Erich)
- Babatunde Aiyegbusi (Commander Azeez)
- Joe Anoaʻi (Roman Reigns)
- Demitrius Bronson
- James Duggan ("Hacksaw" Jim Duggan)
- Doug Furnas
- Verne Gagne
- Jeff Gaylord
- Jon Heidenreich (Heidenreich)
- Bill Kazmaier
- Jim Lanning (Soldat Ustinov)
- John Layfield (Bradshaw)
- Dean Muhtadi (Mojo Rawley)
- Jim Neidhart
- Paul Orndorff
- Tom Pestock (Baron Corbin)
- Larry Pfohl (Lex Luger)
- Bronson Rechsteiner (Bron Breakker)
- Bruce Reed (Butch Reed)
- Sylvester Ritter (Junkyard Dog)
- Joe Sculthorpe (Hank Walker)
- Ron Simmons (Faarooq)
- Eugene Snisky (Gene Snitsky)
- Merced Solis (Tito Santana)
- Shag Thomas
- Randy Thornton (Swoll)
- Leon White (Vader)
- Del Wilkes (The Patriot)
- Brennan Williams (Mace)

== American Football League ==
=== Played in regular season or postseason games ===
- Verlon Biggs
- Bob Bruggers
- Don Joyce
- Bob Konovsky
- Ernie Ladd
- Don Manoukian
- Wahoo McDaniel
- Ron Pritchard
- Clem Turner

=== Offseason, practice squad, or injured reserve ===
- Wayne Coleman ("Superstar" Billy Graham)
- Bill Watts

== All-America Football Conference ==
Played in regular season or postseason games

- Len Levy (Butch Levy)
- Al Lolotai

== American Football League (1926) ==
Played in regular season or postseason games

- Century Milstead
- Sammy Stein
- Cy Williams
- George Wilson

== Canadian Football League ==
Note: This also includes the CFL's predecessor leagues the Interprovincial Rugby Football Union and the Western Interprovincial Football Union

=== Played in regular season or postseason games ===
- Nick Albert
- Joe Anoaʻi (Roman Reigns)
- Joe Blanchard
- Larry Cameron
- Wayne Coleman ("Superstar" Billy Graham)
- Lionel Conacher
- Darren Drozdov (Droz)
- Jeff Gaylord
- Butts Giraud
- Jon Heidenreich (Heidenreich)
- Gene Kiniski
- Glenn Kulka
- Bob Lueck
- Gil Mains
- Ron Mikolajczyk
- Angelo Mosca
- Brian Pillman
- Larry Pfohl (Lex Luger)
- Marvin Pope
- Ron Simmons (Faarooq)
- Wilbur Snyder
- Merced Solis (Tito Santana)
- Woody Strode
- Randy Thornton (Swoll)
- Herb Trawick
- Clem Turner
- Mike Webster
- George Wells
- John Witte
- Rich Young (Ricky Ortiz)

=== Active roster but did not play ===
- George Momberg (Killer Karl Krupp)

=== Offseason or practice roster ===
- James Duggan ("Hacksaw" Jim Duggan)
- Bill Goldberg (Goldberg)
- Dwayne Johnson (The Rock)
- Anthony Luke (Kam Hendrix)
- Dan Matha
- E. J. Nduka
- Dan Sileo (Bonecrusher Sileo)
- Eugene Snisky (Gene Snitsky)

== United States Football League ==
=== Played in regular season or postseason games ===
- Ed Gantner
- Jeff Gaylord
- Ron Mikolajczyk
- Larry Pfohl (Lex Luger)
- Ron Simmons (Faarooq)
- Steve Williams ("Dr. Death" Steve Williams)

=== Offseason or practice squad ===
- William Danenhauer Jr. (Dave Sullivan/Equalizer)

== World Football League ==
=== Played in regular season or postseason games ===
- Joe Carollo
- Ron Mikolajczyk
- Clem Turner

=== Offseason or practice squad ===
- Paul Orndorff
- Dan Spivey (Waylon Mercy)

== XFL ==
Played in regular season or postseason games

- Josh Wilcox
- Rich Young (Ricky Ortiz)

== World League of American Football / NFL Europe ==
Played in regular season or postseason games

- Chad Fortune
- Bill Goldberg (Goldberg)
- Jon Heidenreich (Heidenreich)
- John Layfield (Bradshaw)
- Nick McNeil (Percy Watson)
- Dan Sileo (Bonecrusher Sileo)
- Randy Thornton (Swoll)
- Josh Wilcox

== Arena Football League ==
=== Played in regular season or postseason games ===
- Thaddeus Bullard (Titus O'Neil)
- Bobby Duncum Jr.
- Jon Heidenreich (Heidenreich)
- Kyle Rasmussen (Conrad Tanner)
- Dan Sileo (Bonecrusher Sileo)
- Josh Wilcox
- Rich Young (Ricky Ortiz)

=== Offseason or practice squad ===
- Shawn Hernandez (Hernandez)

== Pacific Coast Football League ==
Played in regular season or postseason games

- Mayes McLain

== American Association ==
Played in regular season or postseason games

- Mayes McLain

== American Professional Football Association ==
Played in regular season or postseason games

- Kay Bell

== Pacific Coast Professional Football League ==
Played in regular season or postseason games

- Kay Bell
- Woody Strode

== American Football League (1934) ==
Played in regular season or postseason games

- Dustin McDonald

== American Football League (1940) ==
Played in regular season or postseason games

- Kay Bell

== United Football League (1961–1964) ==
Played in regular season or postseason games

- Jim Myers (George "the Animal" Steele)
- Bill Watts

== Atlantic Coast Football League ==
Played in regular season or postseason games

- Wayne Coleman ("Superstar" Billy Graham)

== Continental Football League ==
Played in regular season or postseason games

- Wayne Coleman ("Superstar" Billy Graham)
- Frank Goodish (Bruiser Brody)
- Dusty Runnels (Dusty Rhodes)
- Clem Turner
- Buddy Wolfe

== Texas Football League ==
Played in regular season or postseason games

- Frank Goodish (Bruiser Brody)

== North American Football League ==
Played in regular season or postseason games

- George Hultz

== Ontario Rugby Football Union ==
Played in regular season or postseason games

- George Momberg (Killer Karl Krupp)

== The Spring League ==
Played in regular season or postseason games

- Matrick Belton (Trick Williams)

== Indoor Football League ==
Played in regular season or postseason games

- E. J. Nduka

== National Indoor Football League ==
Played in regular season or postseason games

- Nick Mitchell (Mitch)

== German Football League ==
Played in regular season or postseason games

- Babatunde Aiyegbusi (Commander Azeez)

== Polish American Football League ==
Played in regular season or postseason games

- Babatunde Aiyegbusi (Commander Azeez)

== Brazil ==
- Cezar Bononi

== Ukraine national team ==
- Oleg Prudius (Vladimir Kozlov)

== College football only ==
Note: If people were in more than one division, they are only listed at the highest division.

=== Division I ===
- Kevin Adkisson (Kevin Von Erich)
- Matthew Anoa'i (Rosey)
- Chuck Austin
- James Bednarski (Scott Putski)
- Mike Bell
- Dick Beyer
- Matt Bloom (Albert)
- Josh Bruns (Josh Briggs)
- Tully Blanchard
- Cal Bloom (Von Wagner)
- Parker Boudreaux (Harland)
- Matt Cappotelli
- Scott Colton (Colt Cabana)
- Ettore Ewen (Big E)
- Tevita Fifita (Camacho)
- Greg Gagne
- Donald Hager (Jack Swagger)
- Charles Kalani (Professor Tanaka)
- Kevin Kiley (Alex Riley)
- Kenneth Layne (Kenny King)
- Bruce Leaupepe (Toa Liona)
- Andy Leavine
- Keith Lee
- Bill Miller
- Wayne Munn
- Omari Palmer (Odyssey Jones)
- Michael Rallis (Madcap Moss/Riddick Moss)
- Windham Rotunda (Bray Wyatt)
- Frank Speer
- Joe Spivak (Tank Ledger)
- Jesse White (Jake Carter)

=== Division I FCS ===
- Steven Anderson (Steve Austin)
- Hank Avery Jr.
- Brady Booker (Bodhi Hayward)
- Accie Connor (D'Lo Brown)
- Lance Hoyt
- Christopher Jijak (Dominik Dijakovic)
- Roman Macek (Luca Crusifino)
- Chris Nowinski
- Dan Rodimer
- Jason Seguine (Buck Quartermain)
- Charles Wright (The Godfather)
- Emmanuel Yarbrough

=== Division II ===
- Josh Bredl (Bronson Matthews)
- Jonathan Fatu (Jimmy Uso)
- Josh Fatu (Jey Uso)
- Glenn Jacobs (Kane)
- Raymond Lloyd (Glacier)
- Ernest Miller (Ernest "The Cat" Miller)
- Joseph Ruud (Erick Rowan)
- Nelson Simpson (Nikita Koloff)
- Joe Zimbardi (Richard Holliday)

=== Division III ===
- Eric Arndt (Enzo Amore)
- Randy Beidelschies (Javier Bernal)
- John Cena
- Fred Rosser (Darren Young)

=== Junior college ===
- Gary Gordon (Angelo Dawkins)
- Oleg Prudius (Vladimir Kozlov)

=== Colored Intercollegiate Athletic Association ===
- Luther Goodall (Luther Lindsay)

== Professional wrestlers who became football players ==
- Kenneth Doane (Kenny Dykstra, college)
- Frank Leavitt (Man Mountain Dean, National Football League)
- Brock Lesnar (National Football League, offseason only)
- Gable Steveson (National Football League, offseason only)
- Carl Zoll (National Football League)

== Female football players ==
- Christy Hemme
- Kailey Latimer (Kamille)
- Danielle Moinet (Summer Rae)
