= Charley Robinson =

American football player (1925–2007)

- Robinson in 1953

No. 18, 66
- Positions: Middle guard, offensive tackle

Personal information
- Born: May 30, 1925; Lester Manor, Virginia, U.S.
- Died: February 3, 2007 (aged 81); Towson, Maryland, U.S.
- Listed height: 5 ft 11 in (1.80 m)
- Listed weight: 240 lb (109 kg)

Career information
- High school: Maggie L. Walke (Richmond, Virginia)
- College: Morgan State

Career history
- Green Bay Packers (1951); Philadelphia Eagles (1952)*; Baltimore Colts (1953)*; Baltimore Colts (1954)
- * Offseason or practice squad member only

Awards and highlights
- All-CIAA team (1949); All-CIAA team (1950); Morgan State Athletic Hall of Fame (1974)

Career statistics
- Games played: 8
- Starts: 3
- Fumbles recovered: 1
- Touchdowns: 1
- Stats at Pro Football Reference

Charles Rogers "Bull" Robinson (May 30, 1925 – February 3, 2007) was an American offensive tackle and defensive middle guard who played for the Green Bay Packers and Baltimore Colts of the National Football League (NFL). He also wrestled professionally during the 1960s as part of a circuit that toured Texas and New England.

Robinson, an African-American, was a part of the 1951 Green Bay Packers team, that team's second integrated regular season roster of the post-color bar period.

Robinson was inducted into the Morgan State Athletic Hall of Fame in 1974.

== Early life ==
Charley Robinson was born in Lester Manor, Virginia, part of King William County, on May 30, 1925. He grew up in Richmond.

== College career ==
Robinson played college football for the Morgan State University, a historically black college in Baltimore, Maryland, where he was a member of two unbeaten teams, the 8–0 1949 and 6–0–2 1950 squads.

Robinson was chosen as team captain by his peers at Morgan State ahead of his 1950 senior season and later won honors when he was named a member of the All-Colored Intercollegiate Athletic Association team, essentially the All-America team for historically black colleges.

Robinson was also a boxer at the collegiate level, earning the title of heavyweight champion of the CIAA. His skills were of sufficient proficiency that in June 1948 Robinson served as one of the sparring partners of top heavyweight boxer Jersey Joe Walcott.

== Professional career ==
Robinson played two years in the National Football League (NFL), first making the roster of the Green Bay Packers in 1951 as a tackle. The 1951 Green Bay Packers team was only the second time that black players were on the roster.

Robinson was in camp ahead of the 1952 season with the Philadelphia Eagles, but did not land a spot on the team's final roster.

In May 1953 Robinson signed a free agent contract with the Baltimore Colts. He was with the team all through training camp, even projected as a defensive starter at middle guard by a Baltimore Evening Sun beat reporter, but was ultimately unable to land a place on the team for the regular season. Robinson was cut by head coach Keith Molesworth in the penultimate cut made on September 16. Edging out Robinson on the Colts' roster were defensive linemen Sisto Averno and Jim Winkler.

Fortunes changed in 1954, however. In July Colts team president and acting general manager Don "Red" Kellett signed Robinson to another contract with the team. This time, Robinson stuck as a defensive middle guard (nose tackle in a 5-man line), earning a spot on the club's 33-man roster. He ultimately saw action in six games for the Colts for the year, including all of his three career starts. Robinson was one of just four black players on the 1954 Colts, along with Hall of Famer Buddy Young, star halfback George Taliaferro, and end Mel Embree.

In a rainy October 10 game against the Chicago Bears, Robinson scored his only career touchdown when he recovered a first period fumble in the end zone, accounting for six of the Colt's nine points in a 28–9 loss.

== Coaching career ==
During the 1950s and 1960s, Robinson worked as a coach for the semi-pro Baltimore Rams football team. He also wielded the coaching clipboard for a team in the Baltimore Neighborhood Basketball League, the Starlites.

== Wrestling career ==
While he was still at Green Bay in 1951, Robinson first learned about the opportunity for the poorly-paid NFL players of the day to earn money off the field as professional wrestlers. He began to pursue wrestling as a career after his return to Baltimore, training at a local YMCA with fellow wrestler Frank Veney before joining a circuit that toured Texas and New England.

Over the course of his professional wrestling career, which launched in 1955 and ran for more than a decade, Robinson won a total of 70 matches. Robinson wrestled as a "baby face" (good guy), mostly against "villains" (bad guys, also known as "heels").

== Life after football ==
During his time wrestling, Robinson took a position with the Baltimore Department of Recreation and Parks, working first at that agency's Lafayette Center before being appointed as director of the John Eager Howard Recreation Center at Reservoir Hill.

He also opened Bull Robinson Liquors in Baltimore in the late-1960s, ultimately selling the shop in 1989.

Robinson married the former Mazie Price in 1950, living with her until her death in 1973. The couple raised a son.

== Death and legacy ==
Robinson died of cancer at the Gilchrist Center for Hospice Care in Towson, Maryland on February 3, 2007, at the age of 81.

Robinson was inducted into the Morgan State Athletic Hall of Fame in 1974.

== See also ==
- List of gridiron football players who became professional wrestlers
