= Don Hultz =

American football player (born 1940)

- Hultz in 1972

No. 83, 67
- Position: Defensive end

Personal information
- Born: December 16, 1940 (age 85); Moss Point, Mississippi, U.S.
- Listed height: 6 ft 3 in (1.91 m)
- Listed weight: 241 lb (109 kg)

Career information
- High school: Grand Bay (AL)
- College: Southern Miss
- NFL draft: 1963: undrafted

Career history
- Minnesota Vikings (1963); Philadelphia Eagles (1964–1973); Chicago Bears (1974)

Career NFL statistics
- Games played: 141
- Starts: 91
- Interceptions: 4
- Defensive touchdowns: 2
- Stats at Pro Football Reference

William Donald Hultz (born December 16, 1940) is an American former professional football player who was a defensive end in the National Football League (NFL). He played college football for the Southern Miss Golden Eagles.

== Biography ==
As a teenager, Don Hultz began playing football at Mobile County High School in Grand Bay, Alabama. After graduating from high school, he played college football at the University of Southern Mississippi in Hattiesburg, Mississippi, where he played both offensive and defensive positions. In 1962, during Hultz's senior year, Southern Mississippi's football team won the UPI Small College National Championship.

Following college, Hultz signed as a free agent to play in the NFL with the Minnesota Vikings. He played his first season with the Vikings in 1963. Before the 1964 season he was traded as part of a 4-for-1 deal to the Philadelphia Eagles where he played the following 9 seasons. During those first ten years (both at Minnesota and Philadelphia) he wore the number 83. After the 1973 season he was traded to the Chicago Bears where he played his final season in 1974. During that final year he wore the number 67. While in the NFL, Hultz played defensive end, defensive tackle, and linebacker.

Hultz holds the NFL record for the most opponents' fumbles recovered in a season, nine, in 1963, his rookie season..

His brother, George Hultz, also played high school football at Grand Bay, Alabama and later at the University of Southern Mississippi. He was selected in the 1961 NFL draft by the St. Louis Cardinals and played one season in the NFL as an offensive tackle. Later, George worked as a professional wrestler for promoter Nick Gulas.

His son played college football and his grandson, Sam, plays in his town league.
