= No Limit Soldiers =

Professional wrestling stable

Stable
- Members: Master P BA; Chase; Konnan; Rey Mysterio Jr. Swoll; 4x4
- Debut: June 13, 1999
- Disbanded: September 1999

The No Limit Soldiers were a stable in World Championship Wrestling that was formed after rapper Master P signed with the company. The Soldiers notably feuded with The West Texas Rednecks from June to July 1999.

No Limit Soldiers is also used to refer to artists signed to Master P's label No Limit Records, established in 1991, and includes artists such as Master P, C-Murder, Silkk the Shocker, Mia X, Snoop Dogg, Mystikal and more. In 1997, Master P’s group, TRU (The Real Untouchables), released their fourth studio album TRU 2 da Game which features a song titled "No Limit Soldiers". The song, produced by KLC & Mo B. Dick and featuring Master P and his brothers, C-Murder and Silkk the Shocker, with the addition of Mia X, has become one of the group's most influential songs.

== History ==
The relationship between WCW and Master P was supposed to be a symbiotic one, with WCW gaining exposure with fans of hip hop music, and Master P getting his cousin Randy Thornton (Swoll) a break in the wrestling business in the United States, as his only prior in-ring experience was a brief stint in New Japan back in 1991.

Although the No Limit Soldiers, named such after Master P's No Limit Records, were packaged as a face stable, complete with a rallying cry of "Hoody Hooo", they failed to connect with the mostly Southern WCW audience, despite the team's deep south roots. The team’s catchphrase, "Hoody Hooo", is Southern slang (sometimes spelled "Hootie Hoo" or "Hooty Hoo") made popular by dirty south rap of the era. Most notably Outkast’s "Hootie Hoo" off their 1994 album, Southernplayalisticadillacmuzik, as well as TRU's "Hoody Hooo", written by Master P, Silkk The Shocker, and C-Murder, released by No Limit Records in 1999 on the album Da Crime Family.

Master P was first introduced during a press conference on WCW Monday Nitro on June 14, 1999. In his only other televised appearance, on Nitro the following week, he and the Soldiers (including Brad Armstrong, renamed "BA") bullied heel wrestler Curt Hennig by rejecting a present he gave to Master P's brother Silkk The Shocker—a custom-made cowboy hat—with Silkk stomping on it and Master P then assaulting Hennig with a birthday cake. This created confusion among fans as Hennig was a heel who was being bullied by a group of people promoted by WCW as faces. He was reportedly paid $200,000 per appearance by Eric Bischoff for his short participation in WCW.

As part of the storyline, Hennig put together his own four-man country-themed stable of The West Texas Rednecks, along with Barry and Kendall Windham, and Bobby Duncum Jr. However, the Soldiers outnumbered Hennig's group by nearly two to one, and they were put over the Rednecks in a four-man tag match at Bash at the Beach pay-per-view on July 11 when Rey Mysterio Jr. pinned Hennig. The country-rap angle abruptly ended thereafter as the Rednecks were moved into a new feud with The Revolution, save for a July 22 match on WCW Thunder in which Hennig pinned Soldiers newcomer Chase.

Another setback for the Soldiers was that the group consisted of either unestablished rookies such as Chase and Swoll, who were booked to defeat experienced workers such as Fit Finlay and Lenny Lane; and repackaged veterans like Armstrong who would often take the brunt of opponents' offense in tag team matches before Swoll would enter to score the pin. None truly connected with audiences, despite the group's inclusion of fan favorites Mysterio and Konnan.

== Aftermath ==
Following the breakup of the Soldiers, Konnan and Mysterio moved on to form the Filthy Animals, while the other members appeared sporadically on WCW Saturday Night. Swoll and 4x4 were one-time (kayfabe) bodyguards for Dennis Rodman in his feud with Randy Savage, and they, along with BA, briefly feuded with Jimmy Hart's First Family before they were both released by WCW in September, while Armstrong returned to working under his regular ring name. 4x4 temporarily returned as part of Harlem Heat 2000 under the name Kash, then was gone from the company for good when the team disbanded in May 2000.
