= Curt Hennig =

American professional wrestler (1958–2003)

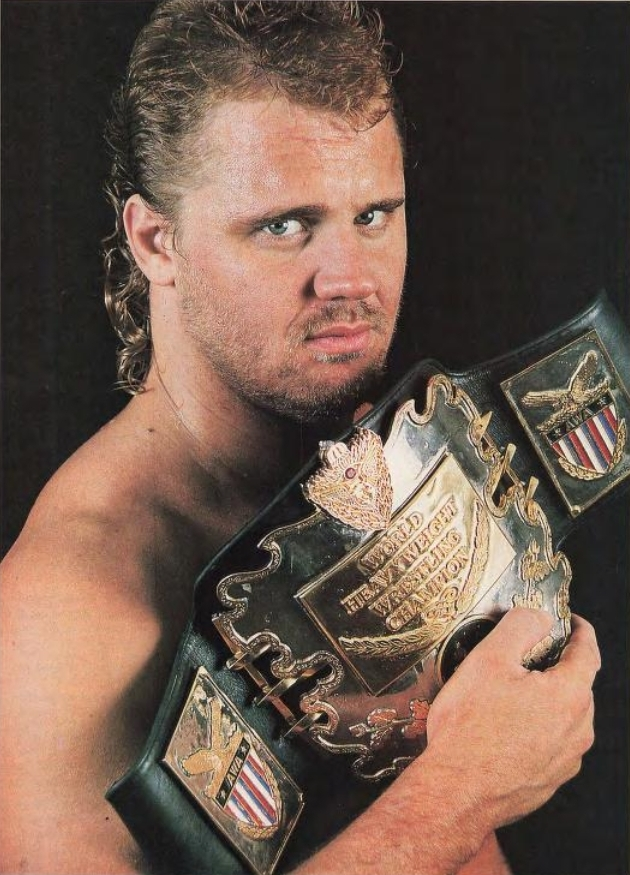
- Hennig c. 1988

Personal information
- Born: Curtis Michael Hennig; March 28, 1958 Robbinsdale, Minnesota, US
- Died: February 10, 2003 (aged 44) Brandon, Florida, US
- Spouse: Leonice Leonard (m. 1978)
- Children: 4, including Joe
- Family: Larry Hennig (father)

Professional wrestling career
- Ring name(s): Curt Hennig; Mr. Perfect
- Billed height: 6 ft 3 in (191 cm)
- Billed weight: 257 lb (117 kg)
- Billed from: Robbinsdale, Minnesota
- Trained by: Verne Gagne; Larry Hennig
- Debut: January 30, 1980

Curtis Michael Hennig (March 28, 1958 – February 10, 2003), also known by the ring name Mr. Perfect, was an American professional wrestler. He performed under his real name for promotions including the American Wrestling Association (AWA), the World Wrestling Federation (WWF; now WWE), World Championship Wrestling (WCW), and NWA Total Nonstop Action. Hennig was the son of wrestler Larry "The Axe" Hennig and the father of wrestler Curtis Axel. He is considered one of the greatest in-ring technical wrestlers of all time. In 2010, WWE ranked him 15th on its official list of the greatest 50 superstars of all time.

Hennig debuted in 1980 and won multiple championships in both Pacific Northwest Wrestling (PNW) and the AWA during the decade. He gained particular attention when he defeated Nick Bockwinkel for the AWA World Heavyweight Championship in 1987, with his 373-day reign being the seventh-longest in history. Hennig moved to the WWF thereafter, where he feuded with Hulk Hogan over the WWF Championship, and won the WWF Intercontinental Heavyweight Championship twice, becoming the longest-reigning titleholder of the 1990s. In addition to winning multiple titles in WCW during the late 1990s, Hennig challenged for the WCW World Heavyweight Championship on pay-per-view (PPV), and led stable and country music group the West Texas Rednecks, who recorded the popular tongue-in-cheek song, "Rap Is Crap". During a stint with the World Wrestling Council (WWC) in 2000, he won the WWC Universal Heavyweight Championship. Hennig returned to the WWF/E for a brief period in 2002, being one of the last three men remaining at that year's Royal Rumble. He later headlined multiple PPV events for TNA, in contention for the NWA World Heavyweight Championship, prior to his death on February 10, 2003.

WWE credited Hennig for raising the standard of technical wrestling in that company, while professional wrestling journalists Bob Ryder and Dave Scherer, in a 2000 publication, recognized him as "one of the best all-round competitors this business has ever produced". Hennig was posthumously inducted into the WWE Hall of Fame in 2007 by former Major League Baseball player and longtime friend Wade Boggs. Hulk Hogan remarked, "Everybody would check their egos at the door when they came to a building that Curt Hennig was in, because you couldn't out-work him, you couldn't outshine him, and you couldn't out-perform him. He was the best of the best."

== Early life ==
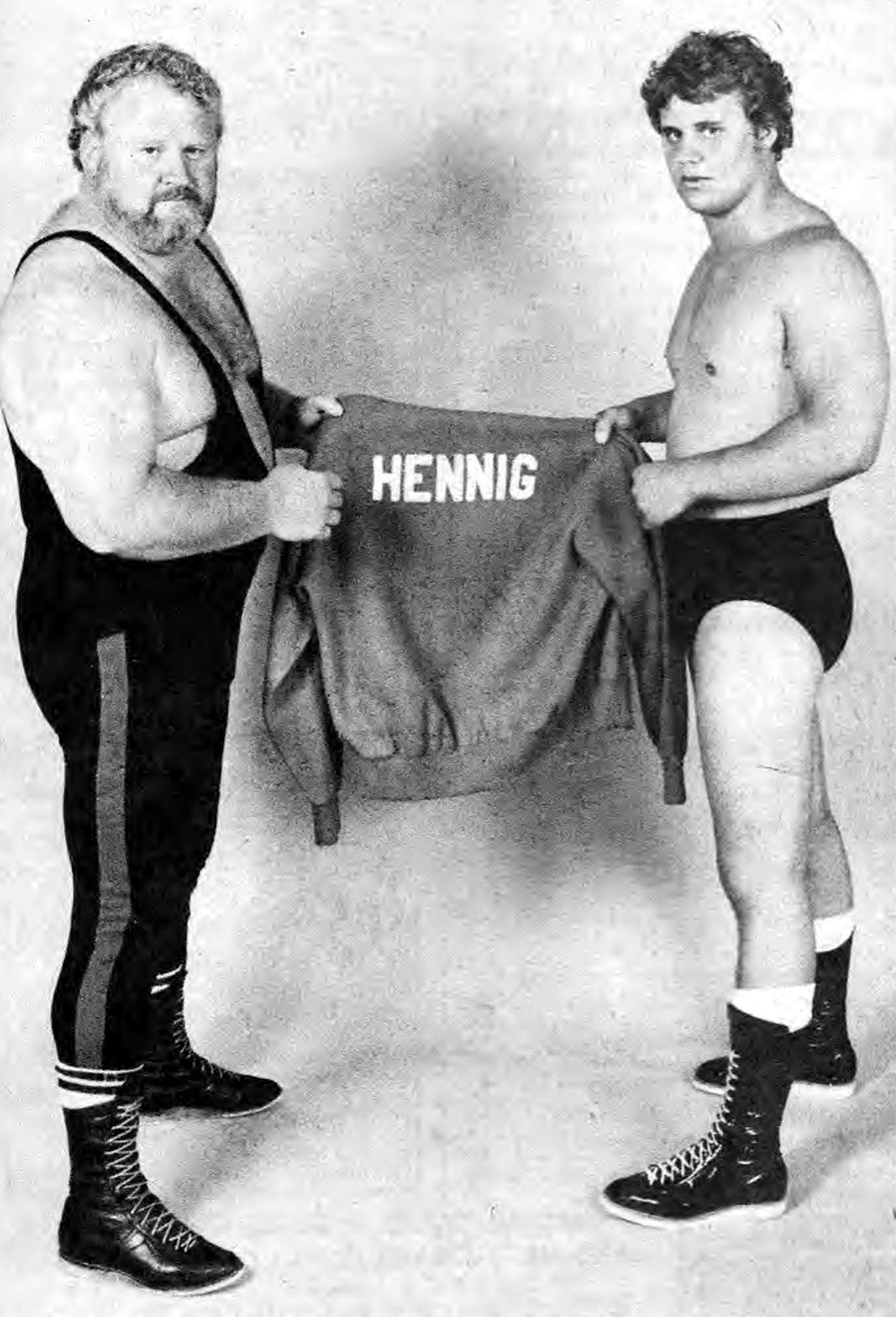
Curt (right) with his father Larry "The Axe" Hennig (left), circa 1981

Curt Hennig was born on March 28, 1958, the son of professional wrestler Larry "The Axe" Hennig. Hennig was childhood friends with fellow wrestler Rick Rude. They attended Robbinsdale High School in his hometown of Robbinsdale, Minnesota, alongside Tom Zenk, Brady Boone, Nikita Koloff, John Nord, Rick Rude, Road Warrior Hawk, and Barry Darsow, who all became professional wrestlers.

== Professional wrestling career ==
=== American Wrestling Association (1980–1982) ===
Known as "Cool" Curt Hennig, he began his career on January 30, 1980, in the American Wrestling Association (AWA), the promotion which had made his father, Larry "The Axe" Hennig a star.

=== World Wrestling Federation (1981–1983) ===
Hennig started his WWF career in 1981. His first victory was against Johnny Rodz. He established himself as a promising young performer against the likes of Buddy Rose, Greg Valentine and Killer Khan. Eventually, he was paired-up in tag team matches with another young upstart, Eddie Gilbert, himself the son of a wrestling legend (Tommy Gilbert).

=== Pacific Northwest Wrestling (1982–1988) ===
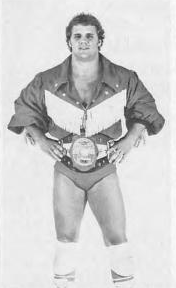
Hennig during his reign as NWA Pacific Northwest Heavyweight Champion, circa 1983

In 1982, Hennig teamed up with his father, Larry, and won the NWA Pacific Northwest Tag Team Championship defeating Rip Oliver and Matt Borne on April 27. He later won the titles with Buddy Rose and Scott McGhee in 1983. He also won the NWA Pacific Northwest Heavyweight Championship in 1983, after defeating Sheik Abdullah Ali Hassan. He lost the title to The Dynamite Kid three months later. From 1984 to 1988 he made occasional appearances for the company. During this time he worked for New Japan Pro-Wrestling and various territories such as NWA St. Louis, Central States Wrestling and Continental Wrestling Association.

=== American Wrestling Association (1983–1988) ===
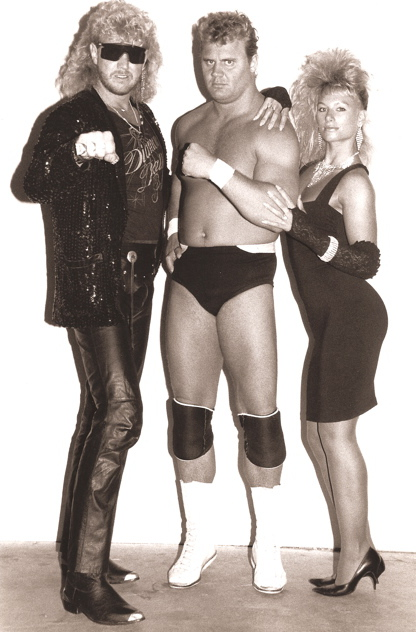
Hennig (center) with Diamond Dallas Page and Diamond Doll Tonya in 1988.

Hennig returned to the American Wrestling Association in 1983.

In late 1985, Hennig formed a tag team with Scott Hall. At the inaugural SuperClash in September 1985, they teamed with Greg Gagne to defeat Larry Zbyszko, Nick Bockwinkel, and Ray Stevens. The team won the AWA World Tag Team Championship by defeating "Gorgeous" Jimmy Garvin and "Mr. Electricity" Steve Regal on January 18, 1986, in Albuquerque, New Mexico. At WrestleRock in April 1986, they successfully defended the titles against the Long Ryders (Bill Irwin and Scott Irwin). Their reign ended in May 1986 when they lost to Buddy Rose and Doug Somers. Hennig and Hall continued to team until December 1986.

Hennig began competing as a singles wrestler, culminating in his defeating Nick Bockwinkel for the AWA World Heavyweight Championship at SuperClash II on May 2, 1987, with the help of Larry Zbyszko, and turning villain in doing so. Hennig, along with his father Larry "The Axe" Hennig, would engage in a long feud with Greg Gagne and his father, Verne Gagne. He began being associated with Madusa Miceli, the AWA World Women's Champion since December 27, 1987. Hennig and Madusa joined The Diamond Exchange, a stable led by Diamond Dallas Page that also included Badd Company and Colonel DeBeers. Hennig held the AWA World Heavyweight Champinship for slightly over a year, losing it to Jerry Lawler on May 9, 1988.

Hennig left the AWA in July 1988.

=== Return to WWF (1988–1996) ===
==== Undefeated streak (1988–1990) ====
Hennig returned to the WWF in mid-1988 and wrestled a dark match with the also-debuting Terry Taylor on July 31 in Milwaukee for the VHS-only Wrestlefest 1988 event. They were ostensibly both being tested out for the "Mr. Perfect" character which Hennig eventually won, leaving Taylor to become The Red Rooster. Hennig made his televised in-ring return on the September 11 episode of All-American Wrestling, defeating enhancement talent Ron Rovishod. On the October 1 episode of Superstars, vignettes began airing on WWF television, during which he was repackaged with a new character of an arrogant braggart villain who claimed to be able to accomplish difficult tasks "perfectly", thus earning his new nickname. He presented himself as being superior in athletics or anything else he did. These clips showed him hitting half-court, three-point, and no-look basketball shots, bowling a score of 300, running the table in billiards, throwing then catching his own Hail Mary football pass, sinking a long golf putt, hitting home runs and making bulls-eyes in darts. Stars of various major league sports, including Wade Boggs (MLB), Steve Jordan (NFL), Felton Spencer (NBA), and Mike Modano (NHL), co-starred with Hennig in these vignettes. Hennig performed for the first time as Mr. Perfect on the October 4 episode of Prime Time Wrestling, where he defeated Jim Brunzell.

His first major PPV match was at Survivor Series 1988 in a five-on-five elimination tag team match as a member of co-captain André the Giant's team, along with Rick Rude, Dino Bravo (also co-captain) and Harley Race against co-captain Jim Duggan's team of Jake Roberts (also co-captain), Ken Patera, Tito Santana and Scott Casey. Perfect survived the match with Bravo. The following year, he appeared in SummerSlam, defeating The Red Rooster in a squash match. He went undefeated on television for over a year, beating mid-card wrestlers including B. Brian Blair, Ronnie Garvin, Koko B. Ware, The Blue Blazer, The Red Rooster, Jimmy Snuka, Tito Santana, and Bret Hart throughout 1989.

On the October 7 episode of Superstars, Perfect began appearing with The Genius, an arrogant, poetry-reciting scholar on The Brother Love Show and began a rivalry with Hulk Hogan over the WWF Championship. Their rivalry heated up when Genius defeated Hogan by countout, with Hennig's assistance on November 25 Saturday Night's Main Event XXIV and the duo stole Hogan's title belt and destroyed it backstage. Perfect and Hogan wrestled on the live events, where he lost to Hogan but they did not compete on television until January 15, 1990, when Hennig received his first opportunity for the WWF Championship against Hogan at Madison Square Garden and this was his first televised match against Hogan, which he won by disqualification but not the title.

At Royal Rumble, Perfect attacked Genius's opponent Brutus Beefcake after their match, which began a feud between the two. Later in the same night, Perfect participated in the Royal Rumble match as the No. 30 entrant. He eliminated Rick Rude before making it to the final two, where he was eliminated by Hogan. Perfect's undefeated streak ended when he suffered his first pinfall loss on regional television against the WWF Intercontinental Champion Ultimate Warrior on March 19, at Madison Square Garden. His first loss in singles competition on national television was against Brutus Beefcake at WrestleMania VI. Hogan settled the score with Perfect with a match between the pair on April 28's Saturday Night's Main Event XXVI, in which Hogan pinned Perfect for the first time on television. Following his loss to Hogan, Perfect quietly ended his association with The Genius.

==== Intercontinental Heavyweight Champion (1990–1991) ====
In May 1990, Perfect participated in a tournament for the WWF Intercontinental Heavyweight Championship after previous champion Ultimate Warrior vacated the title upon winning the WWF Championship at WrestleMania VI. Hennig was booked to win the tournament for the vacant title by defeating Jimmy Snuka in the quarter-finals on the May 5 episode of Superstars and two-time Intercontinental Heavyweight Champion Tito Santana in the finals on May 19 episode of Superstars. This match was subsequently included on the WWF's 1992 home video Battle of the Superstars.

After his title win, Perfect enlisted Bobby Heenan as his "perfect" manager and made a successful title defense against Santana on July 28's Saturday Night's Main Event XXVII. Hennig was scheduled to defend the title against Brutus Beefcake at SummerSlam, stemming from his loss to Beefcake at WrestleMania but Beefcake suffered an injury and The Texas Tornado substituted for Beefcake and challenged Hennig to a title match for SummerSlam on August 11's episode of Superstars, which Perfect accepted on the following week's Superstars. Perfect dropped the championship to Texas Tornado at SummerSlam. Hennig was chosen to lead Demolition as "The Perfect Team" against The Warriors (Ultimate Warrior, Texas Tornado and Legion of Doom) in a four-on-four elimination tag team match at the Survivor Series pay-per-view, where Hennig's team lost. He unsuccessfully challenged Texas Tornado in a rematch for the Intercontinental Championship on November 24 MSG Network special.

Perfect won the WWF Intercontinental Heavyweight Championship for a second time by defeating Texas Tornado on the December 15, 1990 episode of Superstars, with help from Ted DiBiase. Perfect defended the title against Texas Tornado in a rematch on the February 2, 1991, episode of Superstars, where he retained the title by losing via countout. Perfect made his next title defense against Big Boss Man at WrestleMania VII, where he retained the title by losing via disqualification after the challenger was attacked by Haku and The Barbarian. The following month, Perfect won a battle royal on April 27's Saturday Night's Main Event by last eliminating Greg Valentine, which led to a match between the two for Perfect's title on the May 14 episode of Prime Time Wrestling, where Perfect retained the title via disqualification. On a June 15 episode of Superstars, Bobby Heenan retired as a manager and introduced The Coach as Hennig's new manager. Hennig began a rivalry with British Bulldog but suffered a back injury in late June, which led to the rivalry being wrapped up. Bret Hart was announced as Perfect's next challenger on the July 13 episode of Superstars, and in the meantime Hennig was held out of all house shows, usually replaced by Typhoon. On television, he wrestled a few preliminary opponents, but to avoid stressing his back with the Perfectplex, adopted the gimmick of throwing his opposition out of the ring in disgust and defeating them by countout. Perfect lost the title to Hart at SummerSlam and a broken tailbone and bulged discs forced him to retire from the ring.

==== Association with Ric Flair; feud with Shawn Michaels (1991–1993) ====
Hennig spent the following year recovering from his injury. He returned to television on November 23 episode of Superstars where he became Ric Flair's "executive consultant". The following week on Superstars, Perfect became a color commentator of the show for the next full year, acting as a suitable villainous foil to Vince McMahon's play-by-play. During this period, Perfect assisted Flair in winning matches and managed him to two World Heavyweight Championship reigns in 1992. By the fall of 1992, Perfect and Flair were in the midst of a rivalry with Randy Savage, building to a tag team match at Survivor Series where Flair and Razor Ramon would face Savage and Ultimate Warrior. However, Warrior was released from the WWF weeks prior to the event. On November 16 episode of Prime Time Wrestling, Savage asked Perfect to be his partner. After initially laughing off Savage's offer, Perfect was swayed by Savage's cajoling and by Bobby Heenan's degrading comments and commanding Perfect to follow orders, which would lead to Perfect turning into a fan favorite for the first time in WWF by dumping water on Heenan and accepting Savage's offer to return to the ring and become his partner at Survivor Series, much to the delight of the Prime Time Wrestling cast of Hillbilly Jim, Jim Duggan, and Vince McMahon. Hennig made his return to the ring at Survivor Series, where Hennig and Savage won their match.

Perfect began a high-profile rivalry with Flair. He made his return to singles competition on the January 2, 1993 episode of Superstars, where he defeated The Berzerker. Hennig participated in the 1993 Royal Rumble match to determine the No. 1 contender for the WWF Championship at WrestleMania IX. He eliminated Flair, Skinner and Jerry Lawler until he was eliminated by Ted DiBiase, Koko B. Ware and Lawler. Hennig defeated Flair the next night on Monday Night Raw in a loser leaves the WWF match. As a result, Flair left WWF.

Hennig went on to feud with the debuting Lex Luger, who berated Perfect during his promos. Luger won their match at WrestleMania IX though both of Perfect's feet were clearly between the ropes. Afterwards, Perfect chased Luger backstage where he was jumped from behind by Luger's ally Shawn Michaels. As a result, Perfect began a rivalry with Michaels. During this time, Hennig qualified for the first televised King of the Ring tournament by defeating Doink the Clown. At King of the Ring, Perfect defeated Mr. Hughes in the quarter-finals but lost to eventual winner Bret Hart in the semi-finals.

Perfect competed against Michaels for the WWF Intercontinental Championship at SummerSlam, where Perfect lost by countout due to interference from Michaels' new bodyguard Diesel. Hennig's last televised match in WWF was on the November 7, 1993, episode of WWF Wrestling Challenge, where he defeated Iron Mike Sharpe (the match was recorded in October 1993). He was set to participate as a member of Razor Ramon's team at Survivor Series later that month, but was replaced in the match by Randy Savage. Ramon took the microphone before the match saying Perfect was "such a Perfect partner" that he tagged out before the match had even begun. Hennig did not wrestle again until July 1997.

==== Referee; color commentator; association with Hunter Hearst Helmsley (1994–1996) ====
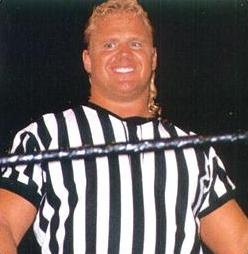
Hennig in referee attire at WrestleMania X in March 1994

Perfect made his surprise return to WWF at WrestleMania X on March 20, 1994, where he was the special guest referee for the WWF Championship match between Lex Luger and Yokozuna. Perfect disqualified Luger after Luger manhandled Perfect, who was tending to Yokozuna's stricken managers Jim Cornette and Mr. Fuji instead of counting the pinfall and turned heel again. Perfect was set to start another rivalry with Luger, during which he explained that he screwed Luger because of Luger's illegal win over Perfect the previous year at WrestleMania IX. However, plans were scrapped after Hennig's back problems flared up again. He left the WWF in the spring of 1994.

Hennig took a year off to recover from a back injury until he returned to the company as a color commentator at the Survivor Series pay-per-view in 1995. The following weekend, Jerry Lawler announced Perfect as his replacement on Superstars, his second stint as a color commentator on the show with Vince McMahon, this time with Jim Ross added as the analyst. Later in 1996, McMahon left and Ross switched to the play-by-play role. Perfect also did color commentary at Royal Rumble, SummerSlam and In Your House 10: Mind Games pay-per-views. Perfect also served as the special guest referee for the WWF Championship match between Shawn Michaels and British Bulldog at June's King of the Ring pay-per-view.

In mid-1996, Hennig was placed in an angle with Hunter Hearst Helmsley, where he would come out to the ringside during Helmsley's matches and steal his female escorts, which would often cause a distraction for Helmsley and affect his performance in matches. During the rivalry, Perfect helped Marc Mero in winning the Intercontinental Championship from Faarooq and assisted him in retaining the title against Goldust at In Your House 11: Buried Alive. The following night on Raw, Perfect was initially going to make his wrestling comeback on Helmsley, but was attacked by Helmsley backstage just moments before their match. It appeared Helmsley's attack left Perfect injured and unable to compete. This all turned out to be a ruse for the purpose of suckering Mero into defending his title against Helmsley. With help from Perfect, Helmsley won the title from Mero. Perfect began to serve as a mentor to Helmsley and accompanied Helmsley to the ring. Perfect left the WWF once again shortly before Survivor Series, making his last televised appearance on November 5 episode of Raw.

=== World Championship Wrestling (1997–2000) ===
==== The Four Horsemen; New World Order (1997–1999) ====
Hennig signed with World Championship Wrestling (WCW) in mid-1997. Since his Mr. Perfect ring name was trademarked by the WWF, he returned to competing under his real name. He debuted in WCW as a fan favorite on the June 30 episode of Monday Nitro, during a brawl which erupted after the main event. His first match in the company took place at July's Bash at the Beach pay-per-view where he became Diamond Dallas Page's mystery tag team partner against nWo members Randy Savage and Scott Hall. Hennig ended up turning on Page costing them the match. As a result, Hennig began a rivalry with Page, defeating him in a match at Road Wild. Hennig continued to use the fisherman suplex as his finishing move, renaming it Hennig-Plex.

Shortly after his debut, Hennig became a top favorite of both Four Horsemen and the New World Order (nWo) as both factions showed interest in recruiting him. He ultimately joined the Four Horsemen, taking the spot of the retiring Arn Anderson. Hennig replied to Anderson's invitation by saying "It would be a privilege." Anderson's plea that Hennig takes "his spot" was the subject of the following week's parody of the Horsemen by the nWo, which led to the WarGames match. At Fall Brawl, Hennig was allegedly jumped backstage by the nWo before the WarGames match and came to ringside mid-match with his arm in a sling. The whole thing turned out to be a setup as Hennig betrayed the Horsemen and joined the nWo, handcuffing the other Horsemen to the cage and then slamming the steel cage door into Ric Flair's head, afterward claiming he had "destroyed the Horseman" and as a further slap to Flair, claimed to be "the wrestler that made Minnesota famous", thus becoming a villain. The following night on Nitro, Hennig won the WCW United States Heavyweight Championship by defeating Horseman Steve McMichael. Hennig held the title for the next three months, during which he successfully defended the title against Flair in a standard wrestling match at Halloween Havoc and a no disqualification match at World War 3, before dropping the title to Diamond Dallas Page at Starrcade.

In the fall of 1997, Hennig was joined by his childhood best friend Rick Rude in the nWo. In 1998, Hennig and Rude were put into a rivalry with Bret Hart and his relatives British Bulldog and Jim Neidhart, during which both teams competed against each other in several matches throughout the first half of 1998. Hennig lost to Hart at Uncensored and defeated Bulldog at Spring Stampede.

Hennig was sidelined due to a knee injury in mid-1998. During this time, the nWo broke into two different factions, the nWo Wolfpac and nWo Hollywood, both Hennig and Rude joined Kevin Nash's fan-favorite Wolfpac group. However, the two villains did not really fit in with the fan favorite Wolfpac faction, especially when Rude would still get on the microphone and tell the fans to shut up. Hennig was scheduled to wrestle Goldberg for the United States Heavyweight Championship at June's The Great American Bash pay-per-view, but he failed to compete due to injury, so he asked Konnan to replace him. Konnan lost the match, and afterward both Hennig and Rude attacked him, removing themselves from the Wolfpac and joining nWo Hollywood. The following month, Goldberg won the World Heavyweight Championship and Hennig, despite his injury, faced Goldberg for the title in a losing effort at Bash at the Beach.

In the fall of 1998, Hennig began feuding with Horseman Dean Malenko over his betrayal of the Four Horsemen the previous year, which resulted in a match between the pair at September's Fall Brawl pay-per-view, which Hennig lost. After the loss, Hennig was taken off television to recover from his knee injury. He returned to WCW at the Starrcade event in December to aid Eric Bischoff in defeating Ric Flair. Hennig joined forces with Barry Windham to take on Flair and his son David in a tag team match at Souled Out in 1999, which Hennig's team lost. In 1999, both nWo factions reunited and Hennig was placed in the nWo B-Team, a group consisting of mid-card wrestlers of the nWo. However, he was kicked out of the group after speaking against the leaders on the January 25 episode of Nitro.

==== West Texas Rednecks and departure (1999–2000) ====
Hennig formed a tag team with Barry Windham and continued the rivalry with The Four Horsemen. Hennig and Windham were placed in a tournament for the vacated World Tag Team Championship, which they won by defeating Horsemen Chris Benoit and Dean Malenko at SuperBrawl IX. Hennig and Windham held the tag titles for a month, before losing to Benoit and Malenko in a lumberjack match, the following month at Uncensored, after Arn Anderson hit Hennig with a tire iron. Hennig competed against Hollywood Hogan in a losing effort the main event of the March 18 episode of Thunder after Horace saved Hogan from a Hennig-Plex. In May, Hennig formed a new faction called The West Texas Rednecks with Windham, Barry's brother, Kendall Windham, and Bobby Duncum, Jr. The group members were presented as southern country musicians. They began feuding with rapper Master P's No Limit Soldiers and recorded an infamous country song titled "Rap is Crap." During the rivalry, Hennig and Duncum lost to Konnan and Rey Mysterio Jr. of the No Limit Soldiers in a tag team match on June 13 at The Great American Bash. Less than a month later, the Rednecks lost to the Soldiers once again in an elimination tag team match at Bash at the Beach on July 11. Rednecks were intended to be villains but the southern WCW fans cheered them instead of the Soldiers, resulting in the angle being dropped. The Rednecks made their final pay-per-view appearance at Road Wild on August 14, where Hennig, Barry and Duncum lost to The Revolution in a six-man tag team match.

After the Rednecks disbanded, Hennig began a storyline, in which he stated that he was following orders from "the powers that be" that if he lost any match by pinfall, he must retire. He participated in a tournament to crown the new World Heavyweight Champion, during which he defeated Disco Inferno in the first round but lost to Jeff Jarrett in the second round. He was forced to retire after losing a retirement match against Buff Bagwell at Mayhem. He was reinstated by the powers that be a month later, however, and joined forces with Creative Control, during which the trio defeated Harlem Heat and Midnight at Starrcade.

He remained on the WCW television, continuing to make sporadic appearances with the company. He entered a feud with Shawn Stasiak in the spring of 2000, after Stasiak referred to himself as "The Perfect One" which was a ripoff of Hennig's "Mr. Perfect" character and even used entrance music composed to sound like Mr. Perfect's theme song. Hennig lost to Stasiak at Slamboree. His last televised match in WCW was against Chris Harris on the May 20 episode of Worldwide, which Hennig won. Hennig left WCW after his contract expired in the summer of 2000.

=== Various promotions (2000–2001) ===
After leaving World Championship Wrestling, in summer 2000 Hennig appeared with the Australian i-Generation Superstars of Wrestling promotion, where he held the i-Generation World Heavyweight Championship on two occasions. Following his appearances in Australia, he began appearing with the World Wrestling Council in Puerto Rico, briefly winning the WWC Universal Heavyweight Championship from Carly Colon. He appeared with the WWC until January 2001. In January 2001, Hennig made a one-night appearance in Japan with All-Japan Pro Wrestling at its King's Road New Century 2001 event, taking part in a six-man tag team match in the Tokyo Dome.

In mid-2001, Hennig made a handful of appearances with Harley Race's World League Wrestling promotion. He then wrestled sporadically on the independent circuit until November 2001, when he joined the newly-formed Xcitement Wrestling Federation. He wrestled for the XWF for the remainder of the year, facing opponents including Buff Bagwell and Vampiro. In December 2001, he made two further appearances with the World Wrestling Council.

=== Second return to WWF/E (2002) ===
During the buildup for January's Royal Rumble, it was announced that Hennig would be returning as one of the 30 combatants in the match. Hennig, again billed as "Mr. Perfect", entered the Royal Rumble at No. 25, and was one of the final three competitors before being eliminated by eventual winner Triple H. His performance, along with the positive reaction of the Atlanta crowd, earned Hennig a full-time contract with the WWF. He was drafted to Raw during the first ever WWF Draft. Hennig worked for WWE until May 8, 2002, when he was released due to a physical confrontation with Brock Lesnar on the return flight from the pay-per-view. Among other incidents of drunkenness, the tussle took place on the infamous "Plane Ride from Hell". According to Rob Van Dam and Tommy Dreamer on the Dark Side of the Ring, Hennig pranked Lesnar by slapping shaving cream on his head, which started the scuffle and almost opened the emergency exit door.

Hennig wrestled his final WWE match on a pretaped episode of Sunday Night Heat where he lost to Matt Hardy which aired on May 12.

=== NWA Total Nonstop Action (2002–2003) ===
After being released from WWE, Hennig went on to work for NWA Total Nonstop Action. On October 9 NWA-TNA, Henning debuted teaming with B.G. James and Syxx and defeated Ron Killings, Jeff Jarrett and Brian Lawler with Hennig pinning World Champion Killings.

Henning would wrestle three matches for the NWA World Heavyweight Championship (two against Ron Killings and one against Jeff Jarrett), but didn't win the title. On October 30 NWA-TNA, Henning lost to Jeff Jarrett in the #1 Contenders match. On November 27, 2002, NWA-TNA, Hennig and B.G. James had a title match for the NWA World Tag Team Championship against Disciples of the New Church (Brian Lee and Slash) but failed to win the titles. Hennig wrestled his last match on January 8, 2003, defeating David Flair in an "Axehandle on a Pole match".

== Personal life ==
Hennig was married to Leonice Leonard John Thomson. They had four children: Joseph, Amy, Kaite, and Hank. Joseph and Amy are professional wrestlers. In addition to his wife and four children, Hennig was survived by his parents, Larry and Irene; two brothers, Randy and Jesse; and two sisters, Sandra and Susan.

== Death ==
On February 10, 2003, Hennig was found dead in a hotel room in Brandon, Florida at the age of 44. The Hillsborough County Medical Examiner's Office declared acute drug overdose to be the cause of his death. It was stated by his father that anabolic steroids and painkillers also contributed to his death.

== Legacy ==
WWE aired a video tribute as well as words from friends and former co-workers Jerry Lawler and Jim Ross on Raw following the news of Hennig's death. TNA paid tribute to Hennig by displaying his wrestling singlet and a framed photo as he was employed by TNA at the time of his death. A tribute song about Hennig, "My Perfect Friend", was featured on the 2003 "Macho Man" Randy Savage album Be a Man.

Other peers including Hulk Hogan, Ric Flair, Bret Hart, Shawn Michaels, and Kevin Nash have also commended Hennig's in-ring talents. During his WWE Hall of Fame speech, Bret Hart spoke highly of Hennig, stating: "Anytime I wrestled Curt was basically a night off", referring to Hennig's ability to wrestle well and safely in the ring. Hennig's widow, Leonice, signed a WWE Legends contract on her husband's behalf.

Wade Boggs, who appeared in a vignette with Hennig and was a friend of his, inducted him into the WWE Hall of Fame on March 31, 2007. His wife, his four children, and his parents accepted the award on his behalf. On July 4, 2007, Hennig was posthumously inducted into the George Tragos/Lou Thesz Professional Wrestling Hall of Fame and Museum in Waterloo, Iowa. His father, who was inducted the prior year, represented him at the event.

On September 9, 2008, WWE released a two-disc DVD set focused on Hennig titled The Life and Times of Mr. Perfect. Promotion for the video included Charlie Haas spoofing Hennig's memorable sports vignettes at a Dave & Buster's on Raw. Finding that he was incapable of performing those feats, Haas decided "there was only one Mr. Perfect." The week after the DVD's release, its first week possible, it went to number one on the Billboard Recreational Sports DVD sales list.

Hennig was mentioned on Raw 1000 by his old friend Bret Hart, who acted as the guest ring announcer for the night's Intercontinental title match. Hart stated that one of his best moments was winning his first ever Intercontinental title from Hennig, and described him as "one of the greatest superstars who ever lived".

Hennig's son Joe used the ring name Curtis Axel, representing his father's first name and his grandfather's nickname, respectively. He then went on to win the Intercontinental Championship in 2013 at Payback on Father's day, and he dedicated his victory to his father. The title win made them the first of three father-son duos to hold the championship, the second being Rikishi and Jey Uso and the third being Rey and Dominik Mysterio.

Hennig was inducted into the Professional Wrestling Hall of Fame in Amsterdam, New York in 2015 by his son Joe.

== In other media ==
Hennig appears in the following video games: WWF Superstars, WWF WrestleFest, WWF Royal Rumble, and WWF King of the Ring for Super NES, WWF Rage in the Cage for Sega CD, WWF In Your House for Sega Saturn and PlayStation but only as commentator alongside Vince McMahon, WCW/nWo Revenge, WCW/nWo Thunder, WCW Nitro, WCW Mayhem, Showdown: Legends of Wrestling, WWE SmackDown vs. Raw 2007, WWE WrestleFest, WWE Legends of WrestleMania, WWE All Stars, WWE SuperCard, WWE 2K14 (as Mr. Perfect (Non-Playable Manager) and as Curt Hennig in his nWo Attire (DLC)), WWE 2K16 (as DLC), WWE 2K17, WWE 2K18, WWE 2K19, WWE 2K Battlegrounds, and WWE 2K24 (as DLC). WWE 2K25, and WWE 2K26..

== Championships and accomplishments ==
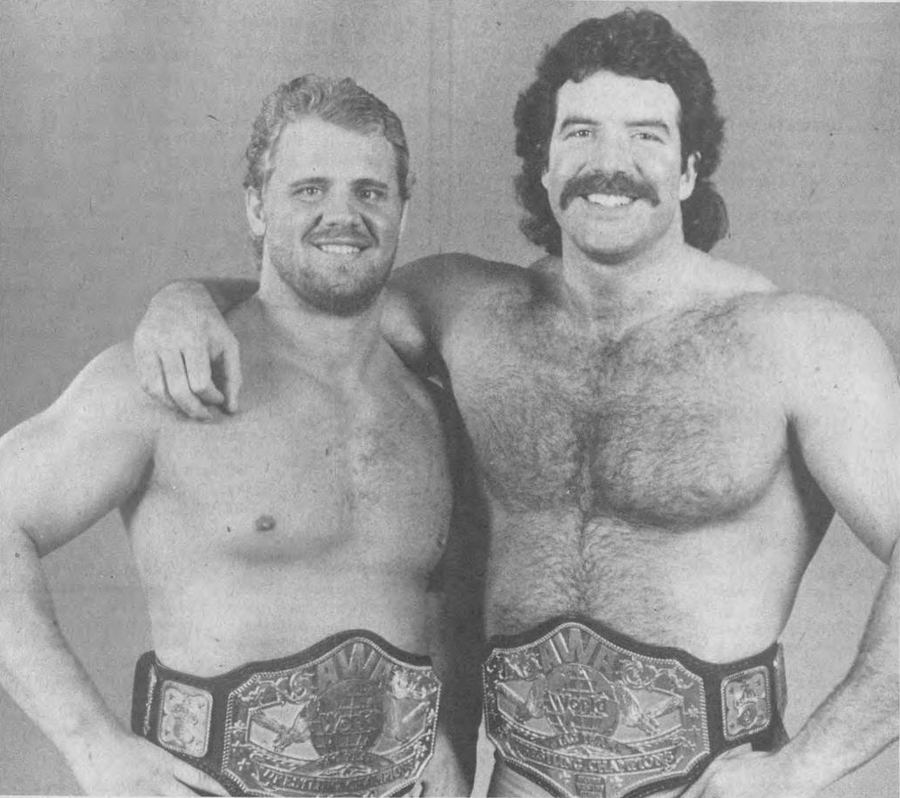
Hennig (left) as AWA World tag team Champions with Scott Hall in 1986

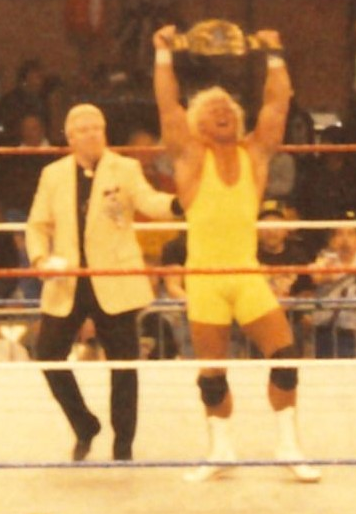
Hennig (right) was a two-time WWF Intercontinental Heavyweight Champion.

- American Wrestling Association
  - AWA World Heavyweight Championship (1 time)
  - AWA World Tag Team Championship (1 time) – with Scott Hall
- Future of Wrestling
  - FOW Heavyweight Championship (1 time)
- George Tragos/Lou Thesz Professional Wrestling Hall of Fame
  - Class of 2007
- i-Generation Superstars of Wrestling
  - i-Generation World Heavyweight Championship (2 times)
- Main Event Championship Wrestling
  - MECW World Heavyweight Championship (1 time)
- Memphis Wrestling Hall of Fame
  - Class of 2022
- Pacific Northwest Wrestling
  - NWA Pacific Northwest Heavyweight Championship (1 time)
  - NWA Pacific Northwest Tag Team Championship (3 times) – with Larry Hennig (1), Buddy Rose (1) and Pat McGhee (1)
  - Salem City Tournament (1984)
- Professional Wrestling Hall of Fame
  - Class of 2015
- Pro Wrestling Illustrated
  - PWI Most Improved Wrestler of the Year (1987)
  - PWI ranked him No. 9 of the top 500 singles wrestlers of the year in the PWI 500 in 1993
  - PWI ranked him No. 55 of the top 500 singles wrestlers of the "PWI Years" in 2003
  - PWI ranked him No. 98 of the Top 100 Tag Teams of the "PWI Years" with Scott Hall in 2003
- Pro Wrestling this Week
  - Wrestler of the Week ( May 17–23, 1987)
- World Wrestling Council
  - WWC Universal Heavyweight Championship (1 time)
- World Championship Wrestling
  - WCW United States Heavyweight Championship (1 time)
  - WCW World Tag Team Championship (1 time) – with Barry Windham
- World Wrestling Federation / World Wrestling Entertainment
  - WWF Intercontinental Championship (2 times)
  - WWE Hall of Fame (Class of 2007)
- Wrestling Observer Newsletter
  - Most Improved (1983)

== See also ==
- List of premature professional wrestling deaths – People associated with professional wrestling who died before age 65
