= Kay Bell =

American football player (1914–1994)

No. 26, 89, 39, 34, 50
- Positions: Guard, Tackle

Personal information
- Born: October 14, 1914; Chehalis, Washington, U.S.
- Died: October 27, 1994 (aged 80); Redmond, Washington, U.S.
- Listed height: 6 ft 2 in (1.88 m)
- Listed weight: 220 lb (100 kg)

Career information
- High school: Abraham Lincoln (Seattle, Washington)
- College: Washington State (1933–1936)
- NFL draft: 1937: 10th round, 97th overall pick

Career history
- Detroit Lions (1937)*; Chicago Bears (1937); Los Angeles Bulldogs (1938–1940); Cleveland Rams (1940)*; Columbus Bullies (1940–1941); New York Giants (1942)
- * Offseason or practice squad member only

Career NFL statistics
- Games played: 21
- Games started: 1
- Stats at Pro Football Reference

Kay Dee Bell (October 14, 1914 – October 27, 1994) was an American professional football player who played two seasons in the National Football League (NFL) with the Chicago Bears and New York Giants. He was drafted by the Detroit Lions in the tenth round of the 1937 NFL draft. He played college football at Washington State University. Bell was also a member of the Los Angeles Bulldogs, Cleveland Rams and Columbus Bulls. He was a professional wrestler and actor as well.

== Early life ==
Bell attended Abraham Lincoln High School in Seattle, Washington.

== College career ==
Bell lettered for the Washington State Cougars from 1934 to 1936. He earned All-American honors.

== Professional football career ==
Bell was selected by the Detroit Lions with the 97th pick in the 1937 NFL draft. He was released by the Lions on March 16, 1937. During the 1937 NFL season, Bell played in ten games for the Chicago Bears, starting one, and none for the Lions.. He played for the Los Angeles Bulldogs from 1938 to 1940. Bell signed with the Cleveland Rams on April 17, 1940, but was later released on September 19, 1940. He played for the Columbus Bullies of the American Football League from 1940 to 1941. He played in eleven games for the New York Giants in 1942.

== Professional wrestling career ==
Bell had a long career as a professional wrestler under the ring name of "Samson", a reference to him appearing in the film Samson and Delilah, and his real name "Kay Bell". He won the Texas Heavyweight Championship in July 1946.

== Acting career ==
Bell was Victor Mature's double in the 1949 film Samson and Delilah. He appeared in a stunt position in the 1956 film The Ten Commandments. He also appeared in the 1949 film Everybody Does It. Bell had parts in several TV shows as well.

== Personal life ==
Bell worked as a deep sea diver during the football off-season. He later retired from professional wrestling to work as a San Mateo County jailer for two years. He then spent fifteen years as a teacher, the last nine in a special-education program for children in San Mateo. Bell died of cancer on October 27, 1994, at his home in Redmond, Washington.

== See also ==
- List of gridiron football players who became professional wrestlers
