= Clem Turner =

American football player (1945–2009)

No. 32, 43, 35, 44
- Position: Running back

Personal information
- Born: May 28, 1945; Cincinnati, Ohio, U.S.
- Died: December 20, 2009 (aged 64); Cincinnati, Ohio, U.S.
- Listed height: 6 ft 2 in (1.88 m)
- Listed weight: 230 lb (104 kg)

Career information
- High school: Woodward (Cincinnati)
- College: Cincinnati
- NFL draft: 1969: 4th round, 83rd overall pick

Career history
- Toronto Rifles (1967); Hamilton Tiger-Cats (1967); Cincinnati Bengals (1969); Denver Broncos (1970–1972); Buffalo Bills (1973)*; Southern California Sun (1974)*; Portland Storm (1974); The Hawaiians (1974)
- * Offseason or practice squad member only

Career NFL/AFL statistics
- Rushing yards: 270
- Rushing average: 3.6
- Receptions: 21
- Receiving yards: 112
- Total touchdowns: 3
- Stats at Pro Football Reference

Clem Turner II (May 28, 1945 – December 20, 2009) was an American professional football player who was a running back for four seasons with the Cincinnati Bengals and Denver Broncos. He also wrestled professionally in the Midwest, most often in Indianapolis and Detroit, between 1972 and 1975.

== Early life and college ==
Clem Turner II was born on May 28, 1945, in Cincinnati, Ohio. He was a running back at Woodward High School in Cincinnati.

Turner played college football for the Cincinnati Bearcats of the University of Cincinnati. He was on the freshman team in 1964, and was a two-year letterman from 1965 to 1966. He rushed 73 times for 243 yards and one touchdown during the 1965 season while also catching six passes for 81 yards and one touchdown. As a junior in 1966, he missed two games due to disciplinary reasons. Despite this, he ended up leading the Missouri Valley Conference in carries (153), rushing yards (840), rushing touchdowns (7), and plays from scrimmage (159).

== Professional football career ==
Turner signed with the Toronto Rifles of the Continental Football League on April 17, 1967. He rushed 36 times for 118 yards and two touchdowns during the 1967 season. He was also a placekicker while with the Rifles, converting three of five extra points and two of six field goals.

In early October 1967, Turner was signed by the Hamilton Tiger-Cats of the Canadian Football League as a replacement for the injured Dick Cohee. Turner played in three games for the Tiger-Cats, recording 25 carries for 99 yards and one touchdown, and two receptions for 12 yards. He was released by Hamilton in late October 1967.

Turner was selected by the Cincinnati Bengals of the American Football League in the fourth round, with the 83rd overall pick, of the 1969 NFL/AFL draft. He played in all 14 games for the Bengals in 1969. From 1970 to 1972, he played in 37 games for the Denver Broncos of the National Football League. In May 1973, Turner and Jack Gehrke were traded to the Buffalo Bills for an undisclosed draft pick. Turner was released by Bills in mid July 1973 for failing a physical. Turner finished his AFL/NFL career with totals of 51 games played, two games started, 74 rushing attempts for 270 yards and two touchdowns, 21 receptions for 112 yards and one touchdown, ten kick returns for 171 yards, three fumbles, and one fumble recovery.

Turner signed with the Southern California Sun of the World Football League (WFL) on March 7, 1974. On July 2, 1974, before the start of the 1974 WFL season, he was traded to the Portland Storm for Wes Grant. On August 16, 1974, Turner was traded again, this time to The Hawaiians for Robin Sinclair and Chris Vella. Turner was released on September 15, 1974. He ended his single-season WFL career with totals of 59 carries for 278 yards and one touchdown, and 13 catches for 92 yards.

== Professional wrestling career ==
In 1972, Turner started in professional wrestling during the football off-season, working in Midwest locations like Indianapolis and Detroit. Turner wrestled at least until 1975.

== Death ==
Turner died on December 20, 2009, at the scene of a two-vehicle collision in Cincinnati. He was 64.

== See also ==
- List of gridiron football players who became professional wrestlers
