= Bob Konovsky =

American football player (1934–1982)

- Konovsky as an amateur wrestler at the University of Wisconsin–Madison, c. 1955.

No. 67, 58, 73
- Positions: Guard, defensive end

Personal information
- Born: August 19, 1934; Cicero, Illinois, U.S.
- Died: March 6, 1982 (aged 47); Chicago, Illinois, U.S.
- Listed height: 6 ft 2 in (1.88 m)
- Listed weight: 246 lb (112 kg)

Career information
- High school: J. Sterling Morton (Cicero)
- College: Wisconsin (1952–1955)
- NFL draft: 1956: 7th round, 77th overall pick

Career history
- Chicago Cardinals (1956–1958); Chicago Bears (1960); Denver Broncos (1961)

Career NFL/AFL statistics
- Games played: 49
- Games started: 31
- Fumble recoveries: 1
- Stats at Pro Football Reference

Bob Konovsky (August 19, 1934 – March 6, 1982) was an American professional football guard in the National Football League (NFL). He was selected in the seventh round of the 1956 NFL draft by the Chicago Cardinals and played three seasons with the team. He also played for the Chicago Bears under coach and founder George Halas in 1960. Following his time in the NFL, Konovsky played with the Denver Broncos during the 1961 American Football League season.

Also a wrestler, Konovsky graduated from Morton High School and played for four years on that school's wrestling team. His junior year of high school he won the Illinois State Wrestling Championship in the heavyweight category. He was a 3 time Big Ten HWT Champion at The University of Wisconsin (Madison) and finished second the NCAA three times and is an inductee in the National Wrestling Hall of Fame and Museum. Bob also was a professional wrestler after college using the nickname Killer Konovsky.

His father, Erwin Konovsky, worked as the superintendent of police in Cicero, Illinois.

== See also ==
- List of gridiron football players who became professional wrestlers
