= Danube, Minnesota =

City in the United States

Danube
- City
- Motto: "The City With Heart"
- Location of Danube, Minnesota
- Coordinates: 44°47′28″N 95°06′10″W
- Country: United States
- State: Minnesota
- County: Renville

Government
  - Mayor: Chris Schneider

Area
  - Total: 0.49 sq mi (1.26 km^{2})
  - Land: 0.49 sq mi (1.26 km^{2})
  - Water: 0 sq mi (0.00 km^{2})
- Elevation: 1,083 ft (330 m)

Population (2020)
  - Total: 458
  - Density: 939.8/sq mi (362.85/km^{2})
- Time zone: UTC-6 (Central (CST))
  - Summer (DST): UTC-5 (CDT)
- ZIP code: 56230
- Area code: 320
- FIPS code: 27-14716
- GNIS feature ID: 2393713
- Website: http://www.cityofdanube.com/

Danube is a city in Renville County, Minnesota, United States. As of the 2020 census, Danube had a population of 458.

== History ==
Renville County's youngest incorporated municipality is Danube. The land on which the village is located was purchased by Fred Emde in 1878, later sold to August Sommerfield in 1893 and then transferred to Ferdinand A. Schroeder in 1899. A community was plotted in the north of Troy Township, Minnesota. Its residents referred to the community as Miles. Like many rural communities, the advent of the railroad (CMSTP&P) affected its origin. The Milwaukee Road RR had placed a siding at the location to serve a mile-long gravel pit 1/2 mile north. That railroad switch had become known as the Gravel Pit Station. The gravel was needed as track ballast for the railroad in its continued expansion. The local farmers were also in need of market rail access closer than the already established towns of Olivia (east) and Renville (west). The first building lots were plotted by F. A. Schroeder, Thomas Slough and J.W. Beck. The town, then known as "Miles", was laid out by 1899 and a rail depot had been constructed.

F. A. Schroeder having been 4th District County Commissioner since 1895, was influential in the community's name change from Danube to Miles. The "Miles" moniker was often confused with other mail drops with similar names, and there was already an established Milwaukee Road depot in Miles, Montana. Ferdinand A. Schroeder was born in Regensburg, Germany which was situated adjacent to the Danube River (Donau auf Deutsch). Many of the early residents were German immigrants. With incorporation, "Danube" had become the popular name-change choice. This occurred in 1901, concurrent to the moving of the county seat from Beaver Falls to Olivia. The Danube Post Office began operation in 1903.

== Geography ==
According to the United States Census Bureau, the city has a total area of 0.47 square miles (1.22 km^{2}), all land.

== Demographics ==
Historical population
Census	Pop.	Note	%±
1910	217		—
1920	300		38.2%
1930	332		10.7%
1940	350		5.4%
1950	437		24.9%
1960	494		13.0%
1970	497		0.6%
1980	590		18.7%
1990	562		−4.7%
2000	529		−5.9%
2010	505		−4.5%
2020	458		−9.3%
U.S. Decennial Census

As of 2000 the median income for a household in the city was $40,000, and the median income for a family was $43,750. Males had a median income of $35,781 versus $22,000 for females. The per capita income for the city was $18,807. About 3.8% of families and 5.6% of the population were below the poverty line, including 5.3% of those under age 18 and 7.5% of those age 65 or over.

=== 2010 census ===
As of the census of 2010, there were 505 people, 209 households, and 145 families residing in the city. The population density was 1,074.5 inhabitants per square mile (414.9/km^{2}). There were 227 housing units at an average density of 483.0 per square mile (186.5/km^{2}). The racial makeup of the city was 97.4% White, 1.2% African American, 0.2% Asian, 0.2% from other races, and 1.0% from two or more races. Hispanic or Latino of any race were 6.7% of the population.

There were 209 households, of which 30.1% had children under the age of 18 living with them, 56.9% were married couples living together, 6.7% had a female householder with no husband present, 5.7% had a male householder with no wife present, and 30.6% were non-families. 26.8% of all households were made up of individuals, and 12.9% had someone living alone who was 65 years of age or older. The average household size was 2.42 and the average family size was 2.90.

The median age in the city was 39.8 years. 24% of residents were under the age of 18; 8.3% were between the ages of 18 and 24; 22.2% were from 25 to 44; 28.1% were from 45 to 64; and 17.2% were 65 years of age or older. The gender makeup of the city was 48.7% male and 51.3% female.

== Arts and culture ==
=== Annual cultural events ===
Danube Fun Days, the city's annual celebration, is an extended weekend with many traditional events taking place during the second weekend in July.

== Notable person ==
- Bob Bruggers - Former NFL linebacker and professional wrestler.
