= Nick Campofreda =

American football player (1914–1959)

No. 43
- Positions: Center, tackle

Personal information
- Born: January 14, 1914; Baltimore, Maryland, U.S.
- Died: May 23, 1959 (aged 45); Towson, Maryland, U.S.
- Listed height: 6 ft 1 in (1.85 m)
- Listed weight: 240 lb (109 kg)

Career information
- High school: Baltimore City College
- College: Western Maryland

Career history
- 1944: Washington Redskins

Career statistics
- Games played: 3
- Stats at Pro Football Reference

Nicholas William Campofreda (January 14, 1914 – May 23, 1959), nicknamed "Big Nick", was an American football player and professional wrestler.

== Biography ==
Campofreda was born in Baltimore, Maryland. He attended Loyola High School and Baltimore City College, then attended Western Maryland College where he played college football.

From 1936 to 1944, Campofreda was a professional wrestler. He wrestled Jack Dempsey several times.

Campofreda played professionally in the National Football League for the Washington Redskins as a center in 1944.

Campofreda was an assistant football coach for Loyola High School in 1946 and was on the first coaching staff of the Baltimore Colts of the All-America Football Conference in 1947. He later worked for WAAM (now WJZ-TV) in Baltimore hosting "WAAMboree", a local variety show. He was the sportscaster for the local news in Baltimore for years and was also the play-by-play commentator for the Baltimore Colts and Baltimore Orioles games. He was the spokesperson for American Brewing in Baltimore and did several commercials for the local brewery.

Campofreda died suddenly in his home in Towson, Maryland in 1959. He was survived by his wife Ellen and their five children.

== See also ==
- List of gridiron football players who became professional wrestlers
