= George Hultz =

American football player (born 1939)

No. 76, 70
- Position: Defensive tackle

Personal information
- Born: March 7, 1939 (age 87); Moss Point, Mississippi, U.S.
- Listed height: 6 ft 4 in (1.93 m)
- Listed weight: 250 lb (113 kg)

Career information
- High school: Mobile County (Grand Bay, Alabama)
- College: Southern Miss (1958–1961)
- NFL draft: 1961: 7th round, 92nd overall pick
- AFL draft: 1961: 30th round, 235th overall pick

Career history
- St. Louis Cardinals (1962); Minnesota Vikings (1963)*; Mobile Tarpons (1966)
- * Offseason or practice squad member only

Career NFL statistics
- Games played: 13
- Stats at Pro Football Reference

George A. Hultz (born March 7, 1939) is an American former professional football player who was a defensive tackle in the National Football League (NFL). He was also a professional wrestler.

== Early life and college ==
George A. Hultz was born on March 7, 1939, in Moss Point, Mississippi. As a teenager, George Hultz began playing football at Mobile County High School in Grand Bay, Alabama. After graduating from high school, he played college football at the University of Southern Mississippi in Hattiesburg, Mississippi from 1958 to 1961, where he played both offensive and defensive positions. He was a two-year letterman from 1960 to 1961.

== Professional football career ==
Hultz was selected by the St. Louis Cardinals in the seventh round, with the 92nd overall pick, of the 1961 NFL draft and by the Boston Patriots in the 30th round, with the 235th overall pick, of the 1961 AFL draft. He signed with the Cardinals in 1962 and played in 13 games for the team during the 1962 season. He was listed as a defensive tackle while with the Cardinals. He was waived on September 3, 1963.

Hultz was claimed off waivers by the Minnesota Vikings in 1963 but was later released.

He was a member of the Mobile Tarpons of the North American Football League in 1964.

== Professional wrestling career ==
Later, Hultz worked as a professional wrestler from 1969 to 1974 in NWA Tri State, World Class Championship Wrestling and for promoter Nick Gulas in NWA Mid-America. He competed against Buddy Wolfe, another former NFL player, among others.

== Personal life ==
His brother, Don Hultz, also played high school football at Grand Bay, Alabama and later at the University of Southern Mississippi. He played in the NFl for the Minnesota Vikings, Philadelphia Eagles and Chicago Bears from 1963 to 1974.

== See also ==
- List of gridiron football players who became professional wrestlers
