= Butts Giraud =

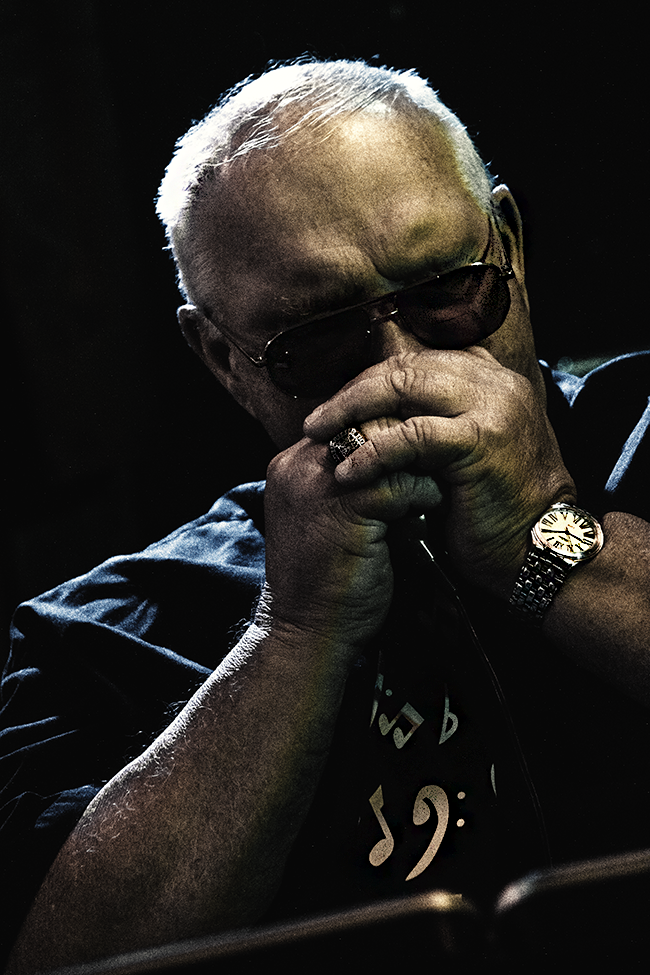
- Born: 1946 (age 79–80); Vancouver, British Columbia
- Education: University of Florida, Western Washington University
- Occupations: President of Dog's Ear T-Shirt and Embroidery Company
- Spouse: Peggy Ann Giraud

Richard "Butts" Giraud is a Canadian entrepreneur, musician, author, and a former professional football player and wrestler. He is the President and founder of The Dog's Ear T-shirt and Embroidery Company. He was a professional wrestler in North America and England. Giraud also won the world belly-flop and cannonball championships in 1975, 1976, 1978 and 1980.

== Early life and education ==
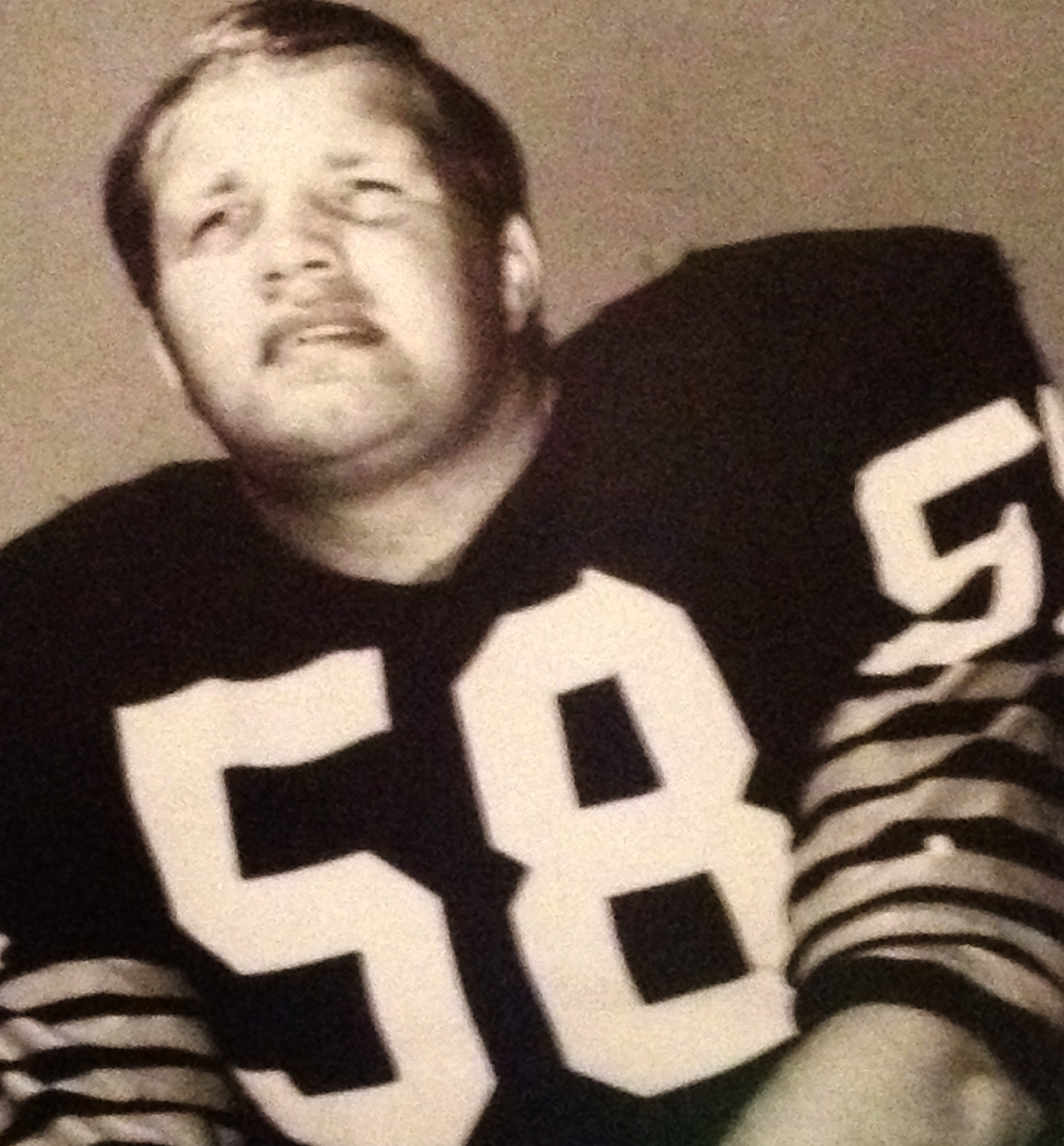
Butts Giraud in football uniform

Giraud started his college football career as a freshman at the University of Florida in 1965 and transferred to Western Washington University in 1967 to 1969. He was elected to Western Washington State University's Hall of Fame, Class of 1991.

== Career ==
In 1970, Giraud played in the Canadian Football League for the BC Lions preseason before being traded to the Winnipeg Blue Bombers. He founded The Dog's Ear T-shirt and Embroidery Company in 1975. That year, Giraud won the World Belly-Flop and Cannonball Diving Championships. He also won the World Championships in 1975, 1976, 1978 and 1980. He also was a professional wrestler who worked for All-Star Wrestling in Vancouver and Pacific Northwest for Portland Wrestling from 1970 to 1981. Giraud helped establish the Towel Power tradition by selling 5,000 towels to Vancouver Canucks fans after the 1982 Campbell Conference Finals. He is also a professional harmonica player. In Summer 2016, he played the blues harmonica on the album Silver Magic by Butts Giraud and Friends. That winter, he released his autobiography, The Last Chapter.

== Personal life ==
Giraud lives in Nanaimo, British Columbia with his wife Peggy.

== Awards and honors ==
- 1967- All Evergreen Conference- Defensive Tackle
- 1967- NAIA District 1 All -Star- Defensive Tackle
- 1968- Honourable Mention NAIA All- American- Defensive Tackle
- 1968- Honourable Mention ALL- American Kodak College Division- Defensive Tackle
- 1968-NAIA District 1 ALL- Star- Defensive Tackle
- 1968-All Evergreen Conference- Defensive Tackle
- 1969- Honourable Mention NAIA ALL- American- Defensive Tackle
- 1969- All Evergreen Conference- Defensive Tackle
- 1969- NAIA District 1 All-Star- Defensive Tackle
- 1969- 2nd Team All Little Northwest- Defensive Tackle
- 1991-Western Washington State University Football Hall Of Fame (Class 1991)
- 1998-1991- President: Sports Fishing Institute Of BC.
- 2003-1st.Team Defence Tackle "All Century Football Team" Western Washington University
- 2012-2015- Church Deacon- Nanoose Evangelical Free Church. Nanoose Bay BC.

== See also ==
- List of gridiron football players who became professional wrestlers
