= Mayes McLain =

American football player and wrestler (1905–1983)

- McLain from The Hawkeye (1930)

No. 25, 30, 22
- Position: Fullback

Personal information
- Born: April 16, 1905; Pryor, Oklahoma, U.S.
- Died: March 6, 1983 (age 77); Marietta, Georgia, U.S.

Career information
- College: Haskell, Iowa

Career history
- Portsmouth Spartans (1930–1931); Staten Island Stapletons (1931); St. Louis Gunners (1931)

Awards and highlights
- Third-team All-American (1926); Second-team All-Big Ten (1928)
- Stats at Pro Football Reference

Mayes Watt McLain (April 16, 1905 – March 6, 1983), also known as Watt Mayes McLain, was an American football player and professional wrestler. He played college football for the Haskell Institute from 1925 to 1926 and for the University of Iowa in 1928. In 1926, he set college football's single-season scoring record with 253 points on 38 touchdowns, 19 extra point kicks, and two field goals. His record of 38 touchdowns in a season stood for more than 60 years until 1988.

McLain later played in the National Football League (NFL), under the name Chief McLain, for the Portsmouth Spartans (1930-1931) and Staten Island Stapletons (1931). After retiring from football, McLain worked as a professional wrestler, sometimes under the name the "Masked Manager", from 1933 to 1953.

== Early life ==
Mayes was born in Pryor, Oklahoma in 1905 as the youngest of six children. A brother and sister died in infancy. His parents were of Cherokee and Scotch-Irish ancestry and were born in Texas; they married in Pryor. Along with other members of his family, Mayes was registered in 1906 at the age of one year on the Dawes Rolls as "Cherokee by Blood" (1/8). Both parents are listed on the Dawes Rolls: his mother is listed as 1/4th Cherokee by Blood, and his father is listed as "IW" (Intermarried White) whose marriage occurred after November 1, 1875. His father, Pleas L. McLain, was a farmer. His mother was Martha A. McLain.

== Football career ==
=== Haskell ===
McLain attended the Haskell Institute in Lawrence, Kansas, a college founded for Native Americans of various tribes. He played football for Dick Hanley's Haskell Indians in 1925 and 1926. During the 1926 season, McLain set the all-time college football scoring record with 253 points on 38 touchdowns, 19 extra point kicks, and two field goals. McLain was considered a triple-threat man who excelled at running, passing and kicking. He also played on defense as well as offense.

McLain opened the 1926 season with two touchdowns in a 65-0 victory over Drury College and followed the next week with eight touchdowns and seven extra point kicks in a 57-0 rout of Wichita. After scoring 55 points against Wichita, The Wichita Eagle wrote, "McLain put up the most astonishing exhibition of football ever seen in Wichita."

On October 2, 1926, McLain scored six touchdowns in a 55-0 victory over Still College. The Lawrence Journal-World reported, "The Husky Cherokee fullback thrilled the fans by his broken field running and his vicious tackling."

In the fourth game of the 1926 season, McLain scored four rushing touchdowns in a 38-0 victory over Morningside College.

For their fifth game, Haskell traveled to Ohio to play the undefeated Dayton Triangles professional football team. The attendance at the game set a Dayton record. Haskell won by a 30-14 score, as McLain rushed for four touchdowns and kicked a field goal. One newspaper account noted, "It was the terrific line smashing of McLain which provided the balance of power ... McLain, a modern Goliath of strength, proved almost unstoppable against a fierce defense massed against him on every play."

The following week, McLain settled for four touchdowns in a 95-0 victory over Jackson College.

In the seventh game of the season, McLain rushed for 129 yards and two touchdowns on 27 carries in a 36-0 victory over Bucknell. One account noted that McLain was "on the rampage, tearing crazily through the Bucknell line."

McLain sustained a knee injury against Loyola University Chicago and saw limited action. McLain also missed the following weeks' game against Boston College and Michigan State College due to the injury.

McLain returned to the lineup in a 27-0 victory over an undefeated Xavier College team on Thanksgiving Day in Cincinnati. McLain scored three touchdowns in the game.

On December 4, 1926, McLain scored one touchdown in a 27-7 victory over the University of Tulsa.

Haskell concluded the 1926 season on December 18 with a 40-7 victory over the Hawaii All-Stars. McLain scored three touchdowns in the game.

McLain finished the season as college football's scoring leader with 253 points on 38 touchdowns, 19 extra point kicks, and two field goals. McLain's total of 38 touchdowns set a new single-season scoring record in college football. His record of 38 touchdowns stood for more than 60 years until 1988.

=== Iowa ===
Cartoon from the Detroit Free Press, November 5, 1928.

McLain enrolled at the University of Iowa and played for the Iowa Hawkeyes football team during the 1928 season. In the preceding two seasons, Iowa had compiled a combined record of 7-9. With the arrival of McLain, the Hawkeyes improved to 6-2 in 1928. McLain was credited with the improvement in Iowa's fortunes in 1928. At the end of the 1929 season, McLain was named to Pan-American Bank's All-American team.

At the start of the 1928 season, the United Press ran a feature story describing Mayes as the "Big Hope of Hawkeye Gridders." The story described the excitement on the Iowa campus:

"'Watch the Big Chief', is the cry of the tall corn fans who are prepared to name Mayes McLain as 1928 All-American fullback before he has ever appeared in Big Ten conference competition. McLain, a 210 pound, fair haired young giant who stands six feet two inches in his stocking feet and crashed the line in a manner which brings back memories of Gordon Locke, Iowa's All-American fullback of championship days, is the big hope of the Hawkeyes."

When the Iowa team played at Chicago's Soldier Field in October 1928, The New York Times wrote:

"Not since the days of Red Grange has Chicago and the Big Ten been as intensely interested in a single gridiron luminary as they are in that giant Indian line smasher, Mayes McLain of Iowa. . . . Weighing more than 215 pounds and standing six feet two inches, McLain, who led in individual scoring while at Haskell two years ago by burning up 253 points in thirteen games, is a terrific driver."

The Hawkeyes defeated the Chicago Maroons, 13 to 0, as Mayes ran for 100 yards. The New York Times reported: "Mayes McLain, giant Indian fullback, swept the lighter Chicago team off its feet."

On November 10, 1928, McLain scored both of Iowa's touchdowns in a 14-7 victory over Ohio State.

In early December 1928, a Big Ten faculty eligibility committee declared McLain ineligible to play another year of Big Ten football. The committee ruled that his two years of play at Haskell counted toward his three years of eligibility under Big Ten rules.

In January 1929, McLain announced that he was working with Iowa's baseball coach "in an attempt to master the art of pitching."

That spring, allegations circulated that Iowa was paying athletes in violation of conference rules. An investigation revealed that a group of alumni had created a "Labor Fund" for the purpose of promoting work for Iowa athletes in local businesses. While most of the athletes were found to have performed actual work, McLain was singled out as an exception. McLain had been paid $60 per month during the 1928-29 academic year "for allegedly taking a 'real estate census' of Iowa City."

=== Professional football ===
In August 1930, McLain signed a contract to play for the Portsmouth Spartans (later known as the Detroit Lions). During the 1930 NFL season, McLain, sometimes referred to as "Chief" McLain, scored four rushing touchdowns and three receiving touchdowns. His total of 42 points tied to the lead of the Spartans in their first NFL season.

In August 1931, the Spartans announced that McLain had been sent a contract to return to the team for the 1931 season. The Portsmouth Times reported at the time: "McLain is located at Pryor, Oklahoma and is in shape to play football on a moment's notice as he has been herding cattle and writes friends that he is hard as nails."

McLain appeared in only one game for Portsmouth in 1931. He also played for the Staten Island Stapletons. He appeared in nine games for a Stapletons team that finished in seventh place in the NFL. McLain was the Stapletons' second-leading scorer (behind Ken Strong) with two touchdowns and 12 points.

McLain also played for the St. Louis Gunners at the end of the 1931 season. In December 1931, he scored all of the Gunners' points in a 10-0 victory over the Des Moines Hawkeyes.

== Professional wrestling career ==
After his professional football career ended, McLain became a professional wrestler. He was active in professional wrestling from March 1933 to May 1942. His wrestling career was interrupted during World War II, but he resumed his participation in professional wrestling from April 1947 to July 1953.

During his wrestling career, he was often a featured attraction at venues such as Madison Square Garden (New York), the New York Hippodrome, the Boston Garden, Maple Leaf Gardens (Toronto), Sydney Stadium (Australia), and the Olympic Auditorium (Los Angeles). He was matched up against many of the most famous wrestlers of the day, including Strangler Lewis, Ed Don George, Ray Steele, and Wee Willie Davis. In September 1938, McLain became the world heavyweight champion in Toronto and held the title for six weeks.

Mayes' notable matches include the following:

- March 1933: Defeated Speers at Madison Square Garden in New York.
- April 1933: Lost to Jack Washburn at Wilmington, Delaware.
- May 1933: Lost to Paul Boesch at the New York Coliseum.
- August 1933: Defeated Al Getzwich in Toronto, Ontario.
- September 1933: Lost to Joe Savoldi in Toronto, Ontario.
- September 1933: Lost to Jim Browning in Toronto.
- December 1933: Lost to Strangler Lewis in St. Louis, Missouri.
- March 1934: Lost to Jim McMillen at Madison Square Garden in New York.
- March 1934: Lost to Joe Savoldi in Reading, Pennsylvania.
- May 1934: Lost to Joe Savoldi in Richmond, Virginia.
- October 1934: Lost to Little Beaver in Richmond, Virginia.
- August 1935: Lost to Howard “Hangman” Cantonwine at Maple Leaf Gardens in Toronto, Ontario, Canada. McLain was knocked out in the match, "examined by doctors and then rushed to hospital in a police ambulance."
- January 1936: Lost to Tiger Daula in Vancouver, British Columbia, Canada.
- February 1936: Draw against Wee Willie Davis at the Tillicum gymnasium in Victoria, British Columbia, Canada.
- March 1936: Defeated Wee Willie Davis at the Masonic Temple in Spokane, Washington. McLain was awarded the match by the referee after he had been "fouled so that he fell to the mat."
- September 1937: Lost to Ray Steele at the Hippodrome in New York.
- November 1937: Lost to Hans Steinke at the Hippodrome in New York.
- April 1939: Lost to Gus Sonneberg at Boston Garden in Boston, Massachusetts.
- May 1939: Lost to Ed Don George.
- May 1943: Lost to Strangler Lewis at the Olympic Auditorium in Los Angeles, California.
- June 1947: Defeated Chief Little Wolf at Sydney Stadium in Sydney, Australia. Chief Little Wolf was disqualified after he "slammed the referee twice to the canvas in the seventh round."
- June 1947: Draw against Dutch Hefner at Sydney Stadium in Sydney, Australia. McLain's rough tactics in the match, including "strangle holds" and a "standing reverse back-bender", had "most of the women spectators . . . solidly against him."
- August 1947: Lost to Fred Atkins at Sydney Stadium in Sydney.
- September 1947: Lost to Sandor Szabo at Sydney Stadium in Sydney.
- April 1949: Lost to Ted "King Kong" Cox in Stockton, California.
- July 1950: Lost by disqualification to Ray Gunkelin Ottawa, Ontario, Canada.

Mayes also worked as a stunt man in the motion picture business. He appeared as a wrestler in the 1936 motion picture, Magnificent Brute.

He retired from wrestling in 1958.

He was inducted into the Pro Wrestling Hall of Fame in 1983.

== Later life ==
McLain died in 1983 at age 77 in Marietta, Georgia. In 1987, he was posthumously inducted into the American Indian Athletic Hall of Fame at Lawrence, Kansas.

== See also ==
- List of gridiron football players who became professional wrestlers
