= Bob Bruggers =

American football player and wrestler (1944–2024)

Profile
- Position: Linebacker

Personal information
- Born: April 20, 1944; Lincoln, Nebraska, U.S.
- Died: May 10, 2024 (aged 80); Florida, U.S.

Career information
- College: Minnesota

Career history
- 1966–1968: Miami Dolphins
- 1968–1971: San Diego Chargers Professional wrestling career
- Born: Robert Eugene Bruggers
- Education: University of Minnesota
- Ring name: Bob Bruggers
- Billed height: 6 ft 1 in (1.85 m)
- Billed weight: 242 lb (110 kg)
- Trained by: Verne Gagne; Billy Robinson
- Debut: 1972
- Retired: October 1975
- Stats at Pro Football Reference

Robert Eugene Bruggers (April 20, 1944 – May 10, 2024) was an American professional football player and professional wrestler. Bruggers played as a linebacker for five seasons for the Miami Dolphins and San Diego Chargers in the American Football League (AFL) and National Football League (NFL).

== Early life ==
Bruggers was born on April 20, 1944, in Lincoln, Nebraska. He was a highly decorated basketball player at Danube High School. After graduating high school, he attended the University of Minnesota, where he was a collegiate basketball player before refocusing on American football.

== Football career ==
After his collegiate basketball career ended, Bruggers turned his focus to football. Undrafted in the 1966 American Football League draft, he signed with the Miami Dolphins and played for the team as a linebacker. He recorded six interceptions and two fumble recoveries during his time with the Dolphins.

During the 1968 season, Bruggers was traded to the San Diego Chargers, where he played for three additional seasons. He was then traded to the Cincinnati Bengals, but an elbow injury ended his professional football career before he played in a game for the team.

== Professional wrestling career ==
After his football career ended, Bruggers was introduced to professional wrestling by Wahoo McDaniel, a fellow former Miami Dolphin. Bruggers became a professional wrestler and competed under his normal name Bob Bruggers. Bruggers was trained as a professional wrestler by Verne Gagne and Billy Robinson, making his debut in 1972 for Gagne's Minneapolis, Minnesota-based American Wrestling Association. In 1973, he began wrestling for Championship Wrestling from Florida. Reflecting his football past, he used a football tackle as his finishing move. In September 1973, he made a brief tour of Japan with International Wrestling Enterprise.

In late 1973, Bruggers began wrestling for Mid-Atlantic Championship Wrestling. In March 1974, he began teaming with Paul Jones, and on April 8, 1974, they defeated The Andersons to win the NWA Mid-Atlantic Tag Team Championship. Bruggers and Jones held the championship until July 4, 1974, when they were defeated by Ric Flair and Rip Hawk.

Bruggers' career came to abrupt end on October 4, 1975. With Bruggers needing to drive from his home in Kingstree, South Carolina, to Wilmington, North Carolina, for an event, promoter Jim Crockett Jr., who was ill with influenza, invited him to instead take his place on a Cessna 310 that he had chartered. Bruggers took a seat on the plane along with Crockett's brother David and fellow wrestlers Ric Flair, Johnny Valentine, and Tim Woods. Shortly before reaching its destination, the plane ran out of fuel and crashed. The pilot, Mike Farkas, sustained ultimately fatal injuries and all five passengers were injured, with Bruggers suffering spinal fractures and a broken ankle. After having steel rods inserted into his spinal column, Bruggers was able to walk out of hospital three weeks after the crash, but decided not to return to wrestling.

== Retirement ==
Following his retirement from football and wrestling, Bruggers worked as a sales manager for a tool company before relocating to West Palm Beach, Florida, where in 1978 he opened a bar using an insurance settlement he had received after the plane crash. He was inducted into the University of Minnesota's "M" Club Hall of Fame in 2002, in recognition of his accomplishments as both a basketball and football player.

Bruggers died in Florida on May 10, 2024, at the age of 80.

== Championships and accomplishments ==
- Mid-Atlantic Championship Wrestling
  - NWA Mid-Atlantic Tag Team Championship (1 time) – with Paul Jones

== See also ==
- List of gridiron football players who became professional wrestlers
