= Jerry Flynn =

American professional wrestler (born 1959)

Personal information
- Born: William Brenneman; November 21, 1959 (age 66) Tampa, Florida

Professional wrestling career
- Ring name(s): Jerry Flynn; Jerry Blayman
- Billed height: 6 ft 4 in (193 cm)
- Billed weight: 251 lb (114 kg)
- Trained by: Boris Malenko
- Debut: 1989
- Retired: 2001

William Brenneman (born November 21, 1959) is an American retired professional wrestler and mixed martial artist, better known by his ring name Jerry Flynn. Flynn is best known for his appearances with World Championship Wrestling between 1996 and 2000. He is also known for his appearances in Japan with puroresu promotions including Pro Wrestling Fujiwara Gumi and New Japan Pro-Wrestling.

== Professional wrestling career ==
=== Early career (1989–1991) ===
Jerry Flynn's professional wrestling career began with training under Boris Malenko. He made his debut in FMW in 1989. During this time, he befriended fellow student Michael Bollea, later known as Horace Hogan.

=== Pro Wrestling Fujiwara Gumi (1991–1993) ===
In 1991, Flynn debuted in the Japanese shoot style wrestling promotion Pro Wrestling Fujiwara Gumi and remained there for a few years. This period also saw Flynn face Masakatsu Funaki on the co-promotional SWS/WWF SuperWrestle card on December 12, 1991. He left Gumi in 1993.

=== Fighting Network Rings (1994) ===
On February 6, 1994, Flynn lost to Yoshihisa Yamamoto at Fighting Network Rings in Tokyo, Japan.

=== World Wrestling Federation (1995) ===
Flynn wrestled for the World Wrestling Federation in June and July 1995 during a tour of the Mid-Atlantic states and Midwestern United States. Flynn made appearances on WWF Monday Night RAW, WWF Wrestling Challenge and WWF Superstars of Wrestling, losing to WWF performers including Jean-Pierre LaFitte, Rad Radford, The Roadie and Waylon Mercy.

=== World Championship Wrestling (1996-2000) ===
==== Early feuds (1996–1999) ====
By 1996, Flynn had worked as a jobber for the WWF, performing in a few house shows before making his way into WCW with help from Brian Blair, a friend of road agent Paul Orndorff, and Mark Starr, who helped gain Flynn a tryout at Universal Studios Florida for a WCW WorldWide taping. He began performing regularly on WCW's secondary TV program, WCW Saturday Night, in 1997 and by the following year was gaining numerous wins over low-card performers.

In 1998, Flynn began to elevate his status, wrestling on Monday Nitro, the company's flagship program. He had a series of matches with Bill Goldberg, which saw Flynn come close to beating Goldberg, but ended up losing, adding several notches in Goldberg's streak, until his defeat by Kevin Nash at Starrcade. In 1999, he had a short-lived feud with Ernest "The Cat" Miller and his manager Sonny Onoo after Miller and Onoo attacked Flynn backstage during an interview with Gene Okerlund and cut off his hair. The feud ended when Flynn gained revenge by defeating Miller and Onoo in a handicap match at the Uncensored pay-per-view. Later that year, he unsuccessfully participated in the Junkyard Invitational at Bash at the Beach.

==== First Family and departure (1999–2000) ====
He then became a member of The First Family, a heel stable managed by Jimmy Hart. However, an injury Flynn sustained led to the eventual disestablishment of the group. In November 1999, Flynn and Juventud Guerrera were arrested for DUI. He then began a feud with mixed martial arts fighter Tank Abbott which Flynn later expressed enthusiasm for. During this time, Flynn's persona emphasized his shootfighting skills including a "shootfight rules" match against The Wall on Thunder. His feud with Abbott culminated at the 2000 Souled Out where Abbott defeated him via knock-out in a mere 1:39. He was released in April of that year.

=== Tokyo Pro Wrestling (1996) ===
In 1996, he teamed up with Mark Starr for Tokyo Pro Wrestling.

=== Independent Circuit (1996-1997) ===
In 1996, he worked on the independent circuit in Florida. He lost to Hercules Hernandez on November 7, 1997 for NWA Florida in Gainesville, Florida.

=== New Japan Pro-Wrestling (1998) ===
In November and December 1998, Flynn returned to Japan, where he wrestled for New Japan Pro-Wrestling (NJPW). Flynn formed a tag team with Dave Finlay, with whom he competed in the annual Super Grade Tag League, a round robin tag team tournament. The tournament was won by Keiji Mutoh and Satoshi Kojima.

=== Later career (2000–2001) ===
On September 19, 2000 in Tampa, Florida, he also unsuccessfully faced Mike Rapada in a tournament final for the NWA World Heavyweight Championship. He wrestled a tour of Puerto Rico for World Wrestling Council, where he briefly held the WWC Universal Heavyweight Championship in February 2001, before retiring.

== Mixed martial arts career ==
Jerry Flynn has a black belt in taekwondo, and he briefly owned and operated his own school of martial arts. Flynn fought mixed martial arts in the WCC (World Combat Championship) losing to Fred Floyd in an alternate bout. Prior to entering professional wrestling, Flynn was employed as a Tae Kwon Do instructor in his hometown of Tampa, FL.

== Mixed martial arts record ==
Professional record breakdown
| 1 match | 0 wins | 1 loss |
| By knockout | 0 | 0 |
| By submission | 0 | 1 |
| By decision | 0 | 0 |
| No contests | 0 | |

| Res. | Record | Opponent | Method | Event | Date | Round | Time | Location | Notes |
|---|---|---|---|---|---|---|---|---|---|
| Loss | 0–1 | Fred Floyd | Submission (choke) | WCC 1 - First Strike | October 17, 1995 | 1 | 3:02 | Charlotte, North Carolina, United States | Alternate bout |

== Championships and accomplishments ==
- IWF
  - IWF Heavyweight Championship (1 time)
- Pro Wrestling Illustrated
  - PWI ranked him #242 of the 500 best singles wrestlers of the year in the PWI 500 in 1999
- SWA
  - SWA Heavyweight Championship (1 time)
- World Wrestling Council
  - WWC Universal Heavyweight Championship (1 time)
