= Chase Tatum =

American wrestler (1973–2008)

- Tatum in the 2007 film Who's Your Caddy?

Personal information
- Born: William Chase Tatum; November 3, 1973 Atlanta, Georgia
- Died: March 23, 2008 (aged 34) Buckhead, Georgia
- Cause of death: Accidental drug overdose

Professional wrestling career
- Ring name: Chase Tatum
- Billed height: 6 ft 3 in (1.91 m)
- Billed weight: 265 lb (120 kg; 18.9 st)
- Trained by: WCW Power Plant
- Debut: 1998
- Retired: 2000

William Chase Tatum (November 3, 1973 – March 23, 2008) was an American professional wrestler and actor, best known for his tenure in World Championship Wrestling (WCW) and his appearance in the 2007 film Who's Your Caddy?.

== Professional wrestling career ==
=== World Championship Wrestling (1998–1999) ===
Tatum signed with World Championship Wrestling (WCW) in 1998 after a person who worked for the company encouraged him to try out. He made his debut on March 3 for a taping of WCW Saturday Night (which aired on March 14), where he was defeated by Bill Goldberg. He served as an enhancement talent for the rest of the year, losing to the likes of Scott Steiner, Scott Norton and Van Hammer.

On January 5, 1999, Tatum won his first match against The Gambler. Later that year, he experienced moderate success by becoming a member of rapper Master P's No Limit Soldiers stable, feuding with the West Texas Rednecks. He faced Rick Steiner for the WCW World Television Championship on the July 26 episode of WCW Monday Nitro, but failed to win the title. In his final appearance, he wrestled Mikey Whipwreck to a no contest on the August 23 episode of WCW Monday Nitro. He was released from the company in September.

Following his stint in WCW, Tatum retired from wrestling due to back issues, which required surgery. However, with no health insurance, he was unable to pay for the surgery and developed an addiction to painkillers.

=== Ultimate Pro Wrestling (2000) ===
Tatum wrestled his last recorded match for Ultimate Pro Wrestling (UPW) on December 20, 2000, where he lost to The Prototype.

== Other media ==
In 2007, Tatum appeared in the comedy film Who's Your Caddy? as Kidd Clean, alongside rapper Big Boi of Outkast. He also worked as a road manager and personal assistant for the band. At the time of his death, Tatum had reportedly "scored a major part" in a movie set to be filmed in New York.

== Personal life ==
At age 19, Tatum won the Mr. Georgia bodybuilding competition. Throughout his life, he worked as a personal trainer. He was good friends with fellow professional wrestler Buff Bagwell, having known each other since high school.

On March 23, 2008, at around 4:00 PM, a friend found Tatum dead at his home in Buckhead, Georgia, after an apparent accidental drug overdose. Ten days before his death, he underwent surgery to repair a degenerative disc. According to his father, Roy, Tatum had been planning to enter a drug rehabilitation facility to help overcome his addiction.

== See also ==
- List of premature professional wrestling deaths
