= West Texas Rednecks =

Professional wrestling stable

Stable
- Members: Curt Hennig (frontman); Bobby Duncum Jr. Barry Windham; Kendall Windham; Curly Bill
- Name(s): The West Texas Rednecks; The West Texas Outlaws
- Billed from: Texas
- Debut: June 13, 1999
- Disbanded: January 28, 2001

The West Texas Rednecks were a short-lived professional wrestling stable and country music band in World Championship Wrestling (WCW) in 1999 and All Japan Pro Wrestling (AJPW) in the early 2000s. They are famous for the recording of two songs, "Rap is Crap (I Hate Rap)" and "Good Ol' Boys".

== History ==
The West Texas Rednecks formed in June 1999 in WCW. The group developed from four wrestlers who fit the mold of a southern gimmick and had teamed with one another in recent months. They were to be a heel group to feud with The No Limit Soldiers led by Master P. Although the Soldiers were packaged as a face stable, they failed to connect with the audience due to actions perceived as that of heels. In Master P's first and only appearance on WCW Television, (against the suggestion of the bookers and other wrestlers) he bullied Curt Hennig by rejecting a present he gave to Silkk the Shocker (a custom made cowboy hat) and then assaulting him with a birthday cake.

Although Hennig was a heel at the time, these actions made the No Limit Soldiers come across to the audience as heels themselves. Not helping the situation was that, even with backup, the Soldiers had more than twice as many members as Hennig's group. The feud was quickly dropped and the Rednecks were given other face groups to quarrel with instead.

The West Texas Rednecks were made up of leader Curt Hennig, brothers Barry and Kendall Windham, and Bobby Duncum, Jr. Although Hennig was actually from Minnesota, he was billed as being from Texas (the other members of the group were all natives of Texas). They filmed several vignettes with them riding four-wheelers and recorded a country song called "Rap is Crap (I Hate Rap)", which received some airplay in the south and on WCW television. In the song, the group expresses their love of country music and southern culture, while also expressing their dislike of hip hop music. "Rap is Crap (I Hate Rap)" was written by Jimmy Hart and Howard Helm, and was released on the album WCW Mayhem: The Music. The group's original theme song, "Good Ol' Boys", was based on Jeff Jarrett's theme song in the mid-1990s. Jimmy Hart's version modifies the verse "We like to watch our wrestling every week on TV" to "We like to watch the Grand Ole Opry every week on TV".

The group's main feuds were with Master P's No Limit Soldiers (Swoll, 4X4, Chase and BA), Four Horsemen members Chris Benoit and Dean Malenko (in the storyline, leftover hatred from when Hennig had betrayed the Horsemen to side with the nWo), Harlem Heat (Booker T and Stevie Ray), and The Filthy Animals (Konnan, Billy Kidman, Rey Misterio Jr., and Eddie Guerrero).

While part of the West Texas Rednecks, the Windham brothers won the WCW World Tag Team Championship. Late in the group's run, they were joined by Curly Bill, who wore a particularly humorous cowboy outfit. They lasted until November 1999, with Lash LeRoux defeating Curly Bill in the stable's last match on the November 27, 1999, edition of WCW Saturday Night. Barry and Kendall Windham were released less than a week later on December 3, 1999. Curly Bill would quietly disappear from television, before reappearing with a new gimmick as Shane on the December 16 edition of WCW Thunder.

The group was originally called The West Texas Outlaws, with "West Texas Rednecks" intended as an insult. The popularity of the name West Texas Rednecks, however, combined with the commentators almost never using the stable's original name, resulted in the group's name being changed.

After their release from WCW, the West Texas Rednecks found work in All Japan Pro Wrestling in November 2000, participating in the World's Strongest Tag Determination League that year. They scored second place in the tournament with 6 points, and pulled an upset victory at a house show against eventual tournament winners "Dr. Death" Steve Williams and Mike Rotunda.

Upon debuting in AJPW, the West Texas Rednecks consisted of Barry Windham and Kendall Windham. The stable used their same "Rap Is Crap" theme song and gimmick, and wore their same shirts but being updated to say "World Tour 2000". Curt Hennig would reunite with the group at the January 28, 2001 Tokyo Dome pay-per-view. This pay-per-view would mark their final television appearance before they quietly disappeared from TV. Curly Bill didn't wrestle in Japan during this phase of the stable's career.

=== Members ===
- Curt Hennig – Guitar, vocals
- Bobby Duncum, Jr. – Lead guitar
- Barry Windham – Drums
- Kendall Windham – Bass guitar
- Curly Bill – Tambourine

== Championships and accomplishments ==
- World Championship Wrestling

- WCW World Tag Team Championship (1 time) – Barry Windham and Kendall Windham (1)
