= Tiger Daula =

Personal information
- Born: Daula Singh Punjab Province, British India

Professional wrestling career
- Ring name: Tiger Daula
- Billed height: 6 ft (183 cm)
- Billed weight: 262 lb (119 kg)
- Billed from: India
- Debut: 1930

Daula Singh was an Indian professional wrestler who wrestled worldwide between the 1930s and the 1960s. He is known for having an impressive undefeated streak.

== Professional wrestling career ==
He competed with wrestlers like Ed Lewis, Bob Kruse, Paul Boesch, Billy Meeske, Sandor Szabo, Tom Lurich, Mayes McLain and Bill Verna etc. On 28 October 1938 he defeated Canadian champion Whipper Billy Watson at Junction Stadium, Manchester.

== Championships and accomplishments ==
- Champion of India
