= Bobby Duncum Jr. =

American professional wrestler (1965–2000)

Personal information
- Born: Bobby Edward Duncum Jr. August 26, 1965 Amarillo, Texas, U.S.
- Died: January 24, 2000 (aged 34) Leander, Texas, U.S.
- Cause of death: Accidental overdose
- Education: University of Texas at Austin
- Parent: Bobby Duncum (father)

Professional wrestling career
- Ring name: Bobby Duncum Jr.
- Billed height: 6 ft 4 in (193 cm)
- Billed weight: 265 lb (120 kg)
- Billed from: Austin, Texas; Durango, Colorado; Minneapolis, Minnesota
- Trained by: Black Bart; Dory Funk Jr. Johnny Mantell; Skandor Akbar; Terry Funk
- Debut: 1989

Bobby Edward Duncum Jr. (August 26, 1965 – January 24, 2000) was an American professional wrestler. He was best known for his stint in World Championship Wrestling (WCW) as a member of the short-lived men's country music band, West Texas Rednecks. Prior to joining WCW, he wrestled for the Global Wrestling Federation (GWF), where he won the GWF Tag Team Championship with John Hawk as the Texas Mustangs, All Japan Pro Wrestling (AJPW) and Extreme Championship Wrestling (ECW). He died of an accidental drug overdose in January 2000.

== Early life ==
Bobby Edward Duncum Jr. was born on August 26, 1965, in Amarillo, Texas, the son of Bobby Duncum Sr., who was also a professional wrestler. He graduated from high school in Durango, Colorado, where he was a state wrestling champion in the 184-pound division. Duncum played collegiate football for the University of Texas at Austin as a defensive end and linebacker from 1985 to 1988, earning four letters. He also played professionally for the Dallas Texans of the Arena Football League from 1992 to 1993 before injuries ended his football career.

== Professional wrestling career ==
=== Early career (1989–1995) ===
Duncum made his professional wrestling debut in 1989 and wrestled for several local promotions in Texas while focusing on his football commitments at the same time. After the end of his football career, he began wrestling full-time in September 1992 for the Texas-based Global Wrestling Federation (GWF) as part of a tag team with Johnny Hawk, collectively known as The Texas Mustangs. On November 27, they defeated The Rough Riders (Black Bart and Johnny Mantell) to win the GWF Tag Team Championship. They lost the titles to Bad Breed (Axl Rotten and Ian Rotten) on January 29, 1993. In March, Duncum wrestled in Japan for the first time with Hawk.

=== All Japan Pro Wrestling (1995–1998) ===
Duncum made his debut for All Japan Pro Wrestling (AJPW) on May 20, 1995, teaming with Rob Van Dam and Stan Hansen to defeat Mitsuharu Misawa, Jun Akiyama and Satoru Asako in a six-man tag team match. Throughout the next few years, Duncum would wrestle in several singles and six-man tag team matches in AJPW, while also making appearances in the Dallas-based Confederate Wrestling Alliance (CWA). From November to December 1997, Duncum and Hansen competed in the Real World Tag League, finishing in sixth place with six points. In his final AJPW appearance on September 11, 1998, he and Hansen lost to Gary Albright and Yoshihiro Takayama.

=== Extreme Championship Wrestling (1997–1998) ===
While still competing for AJPW, Duncum debuted for Philadelphia-based promotion Extreme Championship Wrestling (ECW) on February 14, 1997, defeating Balls Mahoney. He wrestled his only televised match on the September 6 episode of ECW Hardcore TV in a loss to Sabu. Duncum made his final ECW appearance on July 18, 1998, losing to Mikey Whipwreck.

=== World Championship Wrestling (1998–1999) ===
==== Debut (1998) ====
In 1998, Duncum signed a three-year deal with World Championship Wrestling (WCW). He initially appeared in a dark match prior to WCW Monday Nitro on July 27, defeating Sick Boy.

Duncum made his official debut as a fan favorite on the November 16 episode of Nitro, defeating Chris Jericho in a WCW World Television Championship match by countout. However, since championships cannot change hands via countout, Jericho retained the title. Six days later at World War 3, Duncum failed to win the title from Jericho. Duncum continued his feud with Jericho, defeating him once more on the December 3 episode of Thunder before losing to him on the December 7 episode of Nitro.

==== West Texas Rednecks (1999) ====
Duncum became a villain in 1999, joining Curt Hennig, Barry Windham and Kendall Windham as part of a faction called the West Texas Rednecks. Although originally intended to be the villainous rivals of Master P's No Limit Soldiers, a faction of rappers, the Rednecks were instead embraced by the Southern wrestling fans of WCW, particularly due to their country song "Rap is Crap", being cheered over the No Limit Soldiers. On June 13, at The Great American Bash, Duncum and Hennig lost to Konnan and Rey Mysterio Jr. of the No Limit Soldiers. The Rednecks lost to the Soldiers once again on July 11 in an elimination tag team match at Bash at the Beach.

Following the end of their feud with the Soldiers, the Rednecks made their final pay-per-view appearance at Road Wild on August 14, where Duncum, Barry and Hennig lost to The Revolution (Dean Malenko, Perry Saturn and Shane Douglas). On August 22, Duncum wrestled his final recorded match, as he, Barry and Kendall Windham lost to the Filthy Animals (Chavo Guerrero Jr., Eddy Guerrero and Rey Mysterio Jr.). He suffered a knee injury in the fall.

== Personal life ==
Duncum married Michelle Donnelly on July 10, 1994. They had two children, Austen and Cassidy. Austen died on March 25, 2010.

On January 24, 2000, Duncum, aged 34, was found dead of an apparent drug overdose at 5:20 in the morning at his home in Leander, Texas. An autopsy revealed that Duncum had overdosed on fentanyl; he did not have a prescription for the drug, and was supplied it by a relative. It also mentioned that alcohol, cocaine and valium were involved in the overdose. At the time of his death, he was in the process of undergoing a divorce with his wife. That same night, WCW displayed an "in memory of" graphic for Duncum on Nitro. On January 28, a ten-bell salute was held for Duncum at an ECW on TNN taping. His funeral took place the same day, with John Layfield (his former tag team partner John Hawk) and Rob Van Dam in attendance.

== Championships and accomplishments ==
- Global Wrestling Federation
  - GWF Tag Team Championship (1 time) – with Johnny Hawk
- Pro Wrestling Illustrated
  - PWI ranked him #202 of the 500 best singles wrestlers in the PWI 500 in 1999
  - PWI ranked him #494 of the Top 500 Singles Wrestlers of the "PWI Years" in 2003

== See also ==
- List of premature professional wrestling deaths
