= Jim Winkler =

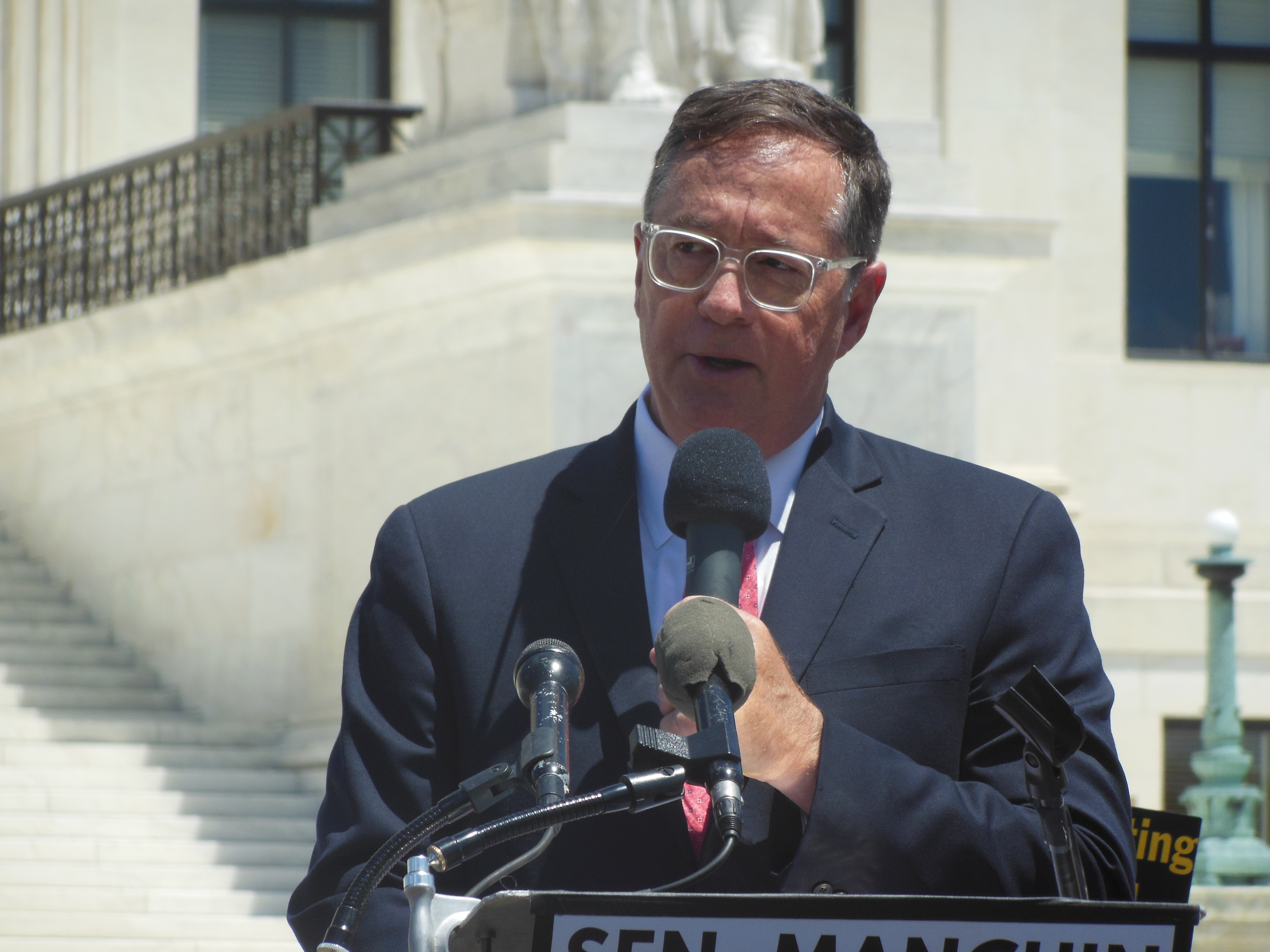
James Winkler at the 2021 Poor People's Campaign

James Winkler is the President and General Secretary of the National Council of Churches. As President and General Secretary, he speaks for the council, works with staff, board members, Christian and interfaith leaders and is responsible for providing leadership and management of daily affairs and operations. Prior to his work with the National Council of Churches, he served as General Secretary of the United Methodist General Board of Church and Society.
