= Dustin McDonald =

American football player (1908–1975)

No. 32, 42
- Position: Guard

Personal information
- Born: October 3, 1908; Heber Springs, Arkansas, U.S.
- Died: February 23, 1975 (aged 66); Bloomington, Indiana, U.S.
- Listed height: 6 ft 4 in (1.93 m)
- Listed weight: 205 lb (93 kg)

Career information
- College: Indiana (1929–1932)

Career history
- Cincinnati Reds (1933)*; Indianapolis Indians (1933); Louisville Bourbons (1934); Green Bay Packers (1935)
- * Offseason or practice squad member only
- Stats at Pro Football Reference

Dustin Columbus McDonald (October 3, 1908 – February 23, 1975) was an American professional football player. A guard, he played college football for the Indiana Hoosiers. After college, he signed with the Cincinnati Reds of the National Football League (NFL) and also had stints with two non-NFL teams before signing with the Green Bay Packers in 1935. He appeared in one game for the Packers before being released. After his sports career he served as a labor leader in Indiana.

== Early life ==
McDonald was born on October 3, 1908, in Heber Springs, Arkansas. The son of a coal miner, he grew up in Linton, Indiana. Once, when young, his father was "laid up", and thus McDonald and his brother worked a shift in the mines instead of their father. McDonald enrolled at Indiana University Bloomington in 1929 and played for the Indiana Hoosiers football team as a guard. After playing for the freshman team in 1929, he received varsity letters from 1930 to 1932. In addition to playing football, McDonald was also a wrestler at Indiana. According to the Anderson Herald, he won the 1932 international YMCA wrestling championship. He was described by The Indianapolis Star as "stellar" and "one of the strongest men ever to perform on an Indiana grid or mat aggregation". He graduated from Indiana in 1933.

== Professional career ==
After college, McDonald signed with the Cincinnati Reds of the National Football League (NFL) in August 1933. He did not appear in any games for the team that year. He also played for the Indianapolis Indians in 1933. At the same time, he began wrestling professionally. In winter months, he competed in the sport in West Virginia and Ohio. In 1934, he played football for the Louisville Bourbons of the American Football League (AFL). He appeared in six games, all as a starter, and helped the team compile a record of 5–3. In 1935, he signed with the NFL's Green Bay Packers; former Packers lineman Bobby Jones had recommended the team sign McDonald. He appeared in one game for the Packers as a backup guard before being released in September 1935.

== Later life and death ==
After his football career, McDonald was a labor leader in Indiana. He was an organizer for the Congress of Industrial Organizations (CIO) and led several strikes. He was once jailed for fighting the police during one of his strikes. He later was a business agent for Local 741 of the Laborers' International Union of North America. He was married and had a step-daughter. McDonald was ill for the last 18 months of his life and died on February 23, 1975, in Bloomington, Indiana, at the age of 66.
