= Professional wrestling tag team match types =

Types of multi-person professional wrestling matches

Much like the singles match, tag team professional wrestling matches can and have taken many forms. Just about any singles or melee match type can be adapted to tag teams; for example, hardcore tag team matches are commonplace. Tag team ladder match and variations are also frequently used as a title feud blow-off match. Stipulations, such as "I quit" or "loser leaves town" may also be applied.

The following are match variations that are specific to tag team wrestling.

== Multiple wrestlers teamed matches ==
Tag team matches can range from two teams of two fighting, to multiple person teams challenging each other. Such examples are six-man tag team matches (known as "Trios" in Lucha Libre and "Triple Tag" in British wrestling) or eight-man tag team matches, in which two teams of three or two teams of four fight in a standard one fall tag team match.

=== Relevos Australianos ===
A six-man tag team match between two teams of three wrestlers. Each team has one wrestler designated as team captain. To win, a team must either score a fall against the opposing team's captain, or one fall each against both of the other wrestlers. These matches are often two out of three falls and rules about tagging in are often stretched. This match type is called relevos Australianos (Australian relay) in Mexico and is most often seen in lucha libre promotions such as Lucha Libre AAA World Wide (AAA) and Consejo Mundial de Lucha Libre (CMLL) although some non-Mexican promotions have used them as gimmick matches as well.

==== Team Relay match ====
The Team Relay match has two or more teams of between 3-12 members to a team and before the match there will be a coin toss to see which team switches out first. Every 3 or 5 minutes the teams will switch. The first team to get a pinfall or a submission wins. Sometimes performed with hardcore rules.

==== Football Classic match ====
A Football Classic match is a match where two cages are placed at ringside, inside each of which is locked a manager with a weapon. The key for each cage is fastened to a football. Two teams of wrestlers must try and gain possession of the football and take it over to their manager's cage, use the key to unlock the cage, then use the manager's weapon to attack the other team. To get the ball to the cage, the wrestlers must pass it between themselves and attack any opposing wrestlers who have possession of the ball. In his autobiography; Mick Foley describes the match as "A fun, fan-inclusive cross between keep away, monkey in the middle, and kill the guy with the ball."

== Elimination-style matches ==
=== Elimination tag team matches ===
Elimination tag team matches are the same as a normal tag team match except that a wrestler who suffers a loss is eliminated from participation. The match continues until all members of one team are eliminated. WWE uses the term "Survivor Series match" to denote an eight or ten person match held during their yearly Survivor Series pay-per-view. Lucha libre wrestling promotions use the term torneo cibernetico (cybernetic tournament) for multi-person elimination matches. Sometimes in these matches, there can be only one winner, so after the other team has been eliminated former teammates face each other in an elimination match. A further variation is where teams of four or more are composed of tag teams, and once a member of a team is eliminated their partner is also eliminated.

==== Three-way tag team elimination match ====
In a three-way tag team elimination match, three teams compete as tag teams with two or more members per team. One member of two teams start. Anyone can be tagged in by anyone else and can be subject to immediate disqualification for failure to accept a tag. When a wrestler is pinned or forced to submit, the entire team is eliminated and the last team left of the three wins.

==== Four-way tag team elimination match ====
Much like in a three-way tag team elimination match, a four-way tag team elimination match (also known as a "fatal four-way tag team elimination match", and at times has also been called the "Raw Bowl" and the "Superstars Bowl"), four teams compete. Anyone can be tagged in by anyone else and can be subject to immediate disqualification for failure to accept a tag. When a wrestler is pinned or forced to submit, the entire team is eliminated and the last team of the four wins.

==== Tag team turmoil ====
Tag team turmoil is another version of an elimination tag team match. Two teams start, and when one is eliminated a new team comes to the ring until all teams have competed, the remaining team is the winner. Teams may either make their entrance from backstage one at a time when it's their turn to wrestle, or—particularly if the match consists of four teams—all occupy a corner each at the start of the match waiting for their turn. Tag team turmoil matches have taken place at SummerSlam in 1999, Armageddon in 2003, Night of Champions in 2010, Night of Champions Kickoff Show in 2013, Elimination Chamber in 2017, and night one of WrestleMania 37. This type of match has also featured on the May 31, 2011 episode of NXT, with a team consisting of a WWE pro and an NXT rookie, and on the May 8, 2017 episode of Raw, where the winning team earned a number one contender's spot for Matt and Jeff Hardy's WWE Raw Tag Team Championship.

==== Tables and stables ====
Tables and stables are similar to table matches, however, in an elimination styled-manner. Two teams consisting of four compete, and one wrestler can be eliminated either getting dropped by their opponent through a table, or accidentally falling by themselves. As with a normal table match, the match is a no disqualification and a no countout match.

==== Captain's fall match ====
A captain's fall match is a match where two teams of multiple competitors compete in an elimination match and captains are assigned to both teams. The purpose of the match is to score a fall over the captain to get the win. Eliminations may occur until the captain is pinned or forced to submit and the team loses if a captain is pinned or forced to submit.

== Mixed matches ==
=== Intergender tag team match ===
This tag-team match features mixed-sex teams. It differs from a mixed tag team match in that wrestler of different genders may face each other. Six-person intergender tag team matches are also common, popularized in the early 2000s by Team Xtreme.

==== Relevos Atómicos de Locura ====
An eight-person tag team match whose teams consist of one male luchador, one female luchadora, one Exótico, and one Mini-Estrella. Typically contested in AAA as an opener to its major events.

=== Mixed tag team match ===
This type of match features teams of either mixed sex or mixed size (a midget wrestler with a non-midget wrestler). Each wrestler is designated by category: male or female in mixed-sex matches, or midget or non-midget in mixed-size matches. Only wrestlers in the same category may be in the ring at the same time. For example, if a woman tags her male partner, both women leave the ring and both men enter. If a midget wrestler tags their non-midget partner, both midget wrestlers leave the ring and both non-midget wrestlers enter. If a wrestler of any category is injured and leaves the match, the counterpart can only be used in outside attacks. In TripleMania 34 of Lucha Libre AAA, Adelicious was only involved in outside dives when Lady Shani was injured in a non-contact injury.

== Parejas increibles match ==
In this match the teams are composed of enemies or rivals. It is meant to illustrate the tension between the desire to win and the hatred for one's rival. Matches with these pairs are used more frequently in Mexico than anywhere else. Since 2011 Consejo Mundial de Lucha Libre (CMLL) holds their CMLL Torneo Nacional de Parejas Increibles.

In the United States, however, this type of tag team format is used sometimes used in WWE, where it is called a "strange bedfellows" match. The now-defunct World Championship Wrestling referred to this type of tag team format as the "lethal lottery", with the members of the winning tag teams advancing to the Battlebowl battle royal.

In traditional/old school British wrestling, a frequent storyline occurrence sees heels fall out with—or otherwise get into a feud with—other heels, and the more sympathetic heel form an alliance and hence a tag team with blue eye enemies of the pure heel (without necessarily making a permanent turn to blue eye.) Legendary masked heel Kendo Nagasaki was frequently an enemy of fellow heels, notably Mark Rocco who would, in their feud, ally with blue-eyes against him (although Nagasaki also occasionally formed such alliances such as the "strange and unholy alliance" with clean-cut blue-eye Steve Veidor in a 1977 house show against heels Bruno Elrington and Bronco Wells as well as a 1976 match reuniting with his mentor Count Bartelli to defeat Wild Angus and John Kowalski.)

== Parejas suicidas ==
Another lucha libre variation of the tag team match, this one begins as a regular tag match but the two members from the losing team are forced to face each other in a lucha de apuestas (bet match), where the loser is forced to either unmask or have their hair shaved off.

As of the early 2010s, CMLL has adjusted their approach to the match in that the winners advance.

=== 8-4-1 match ===
In this match, two teams of four face each other. After the first fall, the losing team is eliminated and the match becomes a four-way singles match between the winning team. It first appeared in TNA Wrestling in 2023; each time, it has been used to establish a contender to a singles championship.

== Scramble ==
Primarily associated with Ring of Honor, a Scramble tag team match has one difference from the normal rules: when a wrestler goes out of the ring either of their own volition or by being forced out, a partner can come in as a replacement without being tagged in. This format is most commonly used in either four corner tags, or with teams of more than 2. The Scramble match can also be done as a six-man scramble where anyone can tag in anyone. This rule is also the norm for all Dragon Gate tag matches.

=== Scramble cage ===
A match held inside a cage with wooden platforms in each of the corners for "high risk" moves. All men are allowed inside and outside of the cage. The match begins with two teams with another entering every two minutes. The match cannot be won until every team is in the match.

== Tag team battle royal ==
This match is conducted similarly to a battle royal. If a wrestler is thrown over the ring ropes, both they and their partner are eliminated from the match. In most cases both wrestlers are considered active at the same time and there are no tags, as in a tornado tag team match. Another variation of the tag team battle royal was used during the 2011 WWE draft, where the wrestler's team has to eliminate all members of the opposing team, much like an elimination tag team match where the losing wrestler of a team, who just got thrown over the ring ropes with both feet on the floor, must return to his locker room. In this variation, the team consists of more than 2 men, all of whom are legal at the same time. Another variation, called the Bada Bing Bada Boom Battle Royal, starts off as a standard tag team battle royal until the final two teams face each other in the usual tag team match.

== Tornado tag team match ==
Originally known as the Texas Tornado match. In this match, all wrestlers involved are allowed to be in the ring at the same time, and thus all wrestlers are vulnerable to having a fall scored against them. Whether or not it is truly a "tag team match" is debatable, as it involves no tagging, but it is contested between tag teams. The first match of this kind was held on October 2, 1937, in Houston between Milo Steinborn and Whiskers Savage against Tiger Daula and Fazul Mohammed. It was the brainchild of promoter Morris Sigel.

== See also ==
- Professional wrestling match types
