= Slamboree (1999) =

1999 World Championship Wrestling pay-per-view event

- Promotional poster featuring Bret Hart and Diamond Dallas Page
- Promotion: World Championship Wrestling
- Date: May 9, 1999
- City: St. Louis, Missouri
- Venue: TWA Dome
- Attendance: 20,516
- Buy rate: 195,000
- Tagline: Watch Rules And Bones Shattered In The Comfort Of Your Own Home.

Pay-per-view chronology
← Previous; Spring Stampede	Next → The Great American Bash

Slamboree chronology
← Previous; 1998	Next → 2000

The 1999 Slamboree was the seventh Slamboree professional wrestling pay-per-view (PPV) event produced by World Championship Wrestling (WCW). It took place on May 9, 1999 from the TWA Dome in St. Louis, Missouri. This was the last WCW PPV to be promoted with the classic logo.

Ten matches were contested at the event, including one dark match. The main event saw Kevin Nash defeat Diamond Dallas Page to win the WCW World Heavyweight Championship. In other prominent matches, Roddy Piper defeated Ric Flair by disqualification to become President of WCW, Gorgeous George defeated Charles Robinson to reinstate Randy Savage as a WCW wrestler, Rick Steiner defeated Booker T to win the WCW World Television Championship, and in the opening bout, Raven and Perry Saturn won a triple threat match to win the WCW World Tag Team Championship.

== Storylines ==
The event featured professional wrestling matches that involve different wrestlers from pre-existing scripted feuds and storylines. Professional wrestlers portray villains, heroes, or less distinguishable characters in the scripted events that build tension and culminate in a wrestling match or series of matches.

== Event ==
Other on-screen personnel
Role:	Name:
Commentators	Tony Schiavone
Commentators	Bobby Heenan
Commentators	Mike Tenay
Interviewer	Gene Okerlund
Ring announcers	Michael Buffer
Ring announcers	David Penzer
Referees	Randy Anderson
Referees	Johnny Boone
Referees	Scott Dickinson
Referees	Mickie Jay
Referees	Nick Patrick
Referees	Billy Silverman

Prior to the pay-per-view, there was one dark match, in which Dale Torborg defeated Johnny Swinger.

In the opening match of the pay-per-view broadcast, Raven and Perry Saturn won the WCW World Tag Team Championship against Rey Misterio, Jr. and Billy Kidman, and Dean Malenko and Chris Benoit in a triple threat match. Raven ultimately pinned Kidman after hitting him with the Evenflow.

Konnan defeated Stevie Ray, in the next match, via pinfall after Vincent and Horace Hogan interfered, followed by Rey Misterio, Jr. hitting Stevie Ray off the top rope.

In the following match Bam Bam Bigelow defeated Brian Knobbs. This match was advertised as a hardcore match, however immediately prior to the match it was changed to a falls count anywhere match. Knobbs attempted to dive from the crowd onto Bigelow, in the concession area. After missing, Bigelow suplexed Knobbs through the table and picked up the pinfall.

During the WCW World Television Championship title match, Rick Steiner defeated Booker T to win the title. Rick’s brother Scott Steiner came to the ring and tripped Booker T, which enabled Rick to hit a bulldog off the top rope, and pick up the pinfall.

The following match saw Gorgeous George face referee Charles Robinson. Due to Gorgeous George’s victory in the match, Randy Savage was reinstated as a WCW wrestler.

In the next match, Scott Steiner successfully defended his WCW United States Heavyweight Championship against Buff Bagwell. Scott’s brother Rick came to the ring, indicating to Bagwell he was there to help him. As Bagwell went to his the Buff Blockbuster, Rick attacked Bagwell with a chair, enabling Scott to pick up the victory.

Roddy Piper next defeated Ric Flair via disqualification, enabling Piper to gain control as WCW President. Ric Flair originally won this match against Roddy Piper by pinfall. Eric Bischoff came out and reversed the decision that Flair was disqualified for hitting Piper with a foreign object, turning Bischoff face for the first time since he turned on Piper and joined the nWo in November 1996. Piper fired Flair after the match.

The following match was scheduled to be between Sting and Goldberg. However, a few minutes into the match Bret Hart returned for the first time in two months, and attacked Goldberg. The Steiner Brothers then ran out and attacked both Sting and Goldberg.

In the main event Kevin Nash originally was awarded the victory over Diamond Dallas Page via disqualification. Randy Savage interfered in the match to assist Page, assaulting Nash and hitting him with the title belt. Eric Bischoff came to the ring after Savage interfered, ordered Doug Dillinger to escort Savage out of the building, and then told referee Nick Patrick to restart the match as a no disqualification match. Nash ultimately picked up the victory and the title after a Jacknife Powerbomb.

== Reception ==
In 2021, Conrad Thompson said that the Konnan vs Stevie Ray match was "one of the worst matches" he has ever seen. Bischoff explained that, while the two of them were great stars, they did not have chemistry.

In 2016, Kevin Pantoja of 411Mania gave the event a rating of 1.5 [Extremely Horrendous], stating, "Wow, this show sucked. It got off to a decent start with a pretty fun triangle tag team match but this fell way off of a cliff after. Nothing else on the show was even able to reach two stars. There was constant interference up and down the card as well as tons of phoned in performances from many of the guys on the card. Just a classic WCW experience from this time period."

== Results ==
No.	Results	Stipulations	Times
1^{D}	Dale Torborg defeated Johnny Swinger	Singles match	—
2	Raven and Perry Saturn defeated Rey Misterio, Jr. and Billy Kidman (c), and Dean Malenko and Chris Benoit (with Arn Anderson)	Triangle match for the WCW World Tag Team Championship	17:28
3	Konnan defeated Stevie Ray (with Vincent and Horace Hogan)	Singles match	06:10
4	Bam Bam Bigelow defeated Brian Knobbs	Hardcore match	11:29
5	Rick Steiner defeated Booker T (c)	Singles match for the WCW World Television Championship	11:08
6	Gorgeous George (with Team Madness) defeated Charles Robinson (with Ric Flair and Asya)	Singles match	10:39
7	Scott Steiner (c) defeated Buff Bagwell	Singles match for the WCW United States Heavyweight Championship	07:11
8	Roddy Piper defeated Ric Flair (with Arn Anderson and Asya) by disqualification	Singles match	12:10
9	Sting vs. Goldberg ended in a no contest	Singles match	08:17
10	Kevin Nash defeated Diamond Dallas Page (c)	Singles match for the WCW World Heavyweight Championship	18:23
(c) / – the champion(s) heading into the match; D / – this was a dark match
