= Team Madness =

Professional wrestling stable

Stable
- Members: Randy Savage; Gorgeous George; Madusa; Miss Madness; Sid Vicious
- Name: Team Savage
- Billed from: Tampa, Florida
- Debut: April 1999
- Disbanded: July 1999

Team Madness was a professional wrestling heel stable in World Championship Wrestling (WCW) led by Randy Savage, that began in April 1999 and ended three months later in July.

== History ==
=== Background ===
Between June 1998 and March 1999, Randy Savage was on hiatus from WCW while recovering from at least two major knee surgeries. He made one appearance during this period, helping Ric Flair defeat Eric Bischoff for the Presidency of WCW on the December 28, 1998 episode of Monday Nitro. Stephanie Bellars accompanied Savage to the ring on this night, though she was not identified during the program.

When Savage returned in April 1999, he debuted a new look and theme music, sporting a slicked back ponytail and a new heel attitude, as well as introducing Bellars as his valet, "Gorgeous George". His first action was as the guest referee in the main event at Spring Stampede, which was won by Diamond Dallas Page (DDP). For a short time afterward, Savage interfered in DDP's matches to make sure that Page kept the WCW World Heavyweight Championship.

=== Formation ===
Savage started feuding with Ric Flair while Gorgeous George started feuding with Flair's biased referee Charles Robinson. When Ric Flair fired Randy Savage, he suggested a "my girl against your girl" match, pointing at referee Charles Robinson, where the special stipulation would be that if Gorgeous George won, Savage would be reinstated. It was around that time that Madusa and Miss Madness joined Macho Man as his other two valets.

Savage asked Miss Madness and Madusa to train Gorgeous George for the match. Behind the scenes, Nora and Madusa trained the other women of WCW at the WCW Power Plant. Gorgeous George had her wrestling match against Robinson at Slamboree on May 9, 1999, during which she used Savage's moves and Robinson mimicked Flair, who was his idol growing up. George pinned Robinson after a diving elbow drop. George was replaced in future matches with Madusa.

When Kevin Nash won the WCW World Heavyweight Championship beating DDP at Slamboree, Savage went after the title himself. As part of the storyline, the villainous alliance would interfere in matches for the benefit of Savage. At The Great American Bash, Sid Vicious returned to WCW and helped Savage to attack Kevin Nash. This led to a tag team match at Bash at the Beach between Kevin Nash and Sting against Savage and Sid, in which whoever scored the winning fall would win the WCW World Heavyweight Championship. Savage won his fourth and final WCW World Heavyweight Championship when he pinned Nash.

Savage's last reign as champion did not last long. The next night on Nitro, he lost the title to a returning Hollywood Hogan, when Nash interfered and powerbombed Savage.

=== Separation and beyond ===
Team Madness slowly started to disband after Madusa and Miss Madness began fighting each other over who was responsible for Savage's title loss. Eventually, Savage fired both of them and started a feud with Dennis Rodman, defeating him at Road Wild using a chain given by Gorgeous George.

After the disbandment, the villainous Madusa entered into a tournament for the WCW World Heavyweight Championship, but she was defeated and eliminated by Chris Benoit. After her elimination, Madusa put all her focus on managing Evan Karagias, with whom she also formed a romantic relationship.

Miss Madness became Mona, a fan favorite, who wrestled in a blue cocktail dress and barefoot. She embarked on mini-feuds with Madusa, Little Jeannie, and Asya. She then became Molly Holly in the World Wrestling Federation/Entertainment.

== Championships and accomplishments ==
- World Championship Wrestling
  - WCW World Heavyweight Championship (1 time) – Savage

== See also ==
- The Dangerous Alliance
- The Diamond Exchange
- The Mega Powers
- The Millionaire's Club
- New World Order (nWo)
