= Christi Wolf =

American bodybuilder and professional wrestler (born 1966)

- Professional bodybuilder

Personal info
- Born: August 7, 1966 (age 60); Corning, New York, U.S.

Best statistics

Professional (Pro) career
- Pro-debut: 1998 NPC Nationals; 1998
- Best win: 1998 NPC Nationals HW Champion; 1995, 1998

Christine Marie Wolf (born August 7, 1966) is an American bodybuilder, model and former professional wrestler. She is best known for her stint in World Championship Wrestling under the ring name Asya.

== Early career ==
Prior to her professional wrestling career, Wolf was originally a model for bikinis and Hawaiian Tropic. While modeling, Wolf began bodybuilding and won several titles on both the state and national level.

== Professional wrestling career ==
Christi Wolf
Personal information
- Born: Christine Marie Wolf; August 7, 1966 (age 60) Corning, New York, U.S.

Professional wrestling career
- Ring name(s): Double D Asya; The Head Nurse
- Billed height: 5 ft 2 in (157 cm)
- Billed weight: 145 lb (66 kg)
- Trained by: WCW Power Plant
- Debut: April 1999
- Retired: August 2000

=== World Championship Wrestling (1999–2000) ===
==== Beginnings ====
In April 1999, Wolf began appearing as a head nurse to tend to Ric Flair when he was (in storyline) put into a mental institution. She then appeared in several vignettes with him before becoming his valet upon his return to WCW. On the May 3, 1999 episode of Nitro, the Head Nurse accompanied Flair to the ring as he then called out "Macho Man" Randy Savage, whom he was feuding with. When Savage and his own valet, Gorgeous George, came out to the ring, Flair called security on Savage, resulting in George being choked out by the Head Nurse.

The nurse was introduced as Double D when she, along with Ric Flair, Arn Anderson, and Samantha, accompanied Flair's son David to his United States Heavyweight Championship contest against Dean Malenko at the Bash at the Beach. During the match, Double D confronted Anderson, who got into the ring. Malenko intervened and, hesitating to hit a woman, instead locked her into his cloverleaf submission hold. Ric Flair took the opportunity to hit Malenko with the U.S. title belt to allow David to pin Malenko to retain the title.

==== The Revolution ====
On October 25 at Halloween Havoc, The Filthy Animals showed a video of them kidnapping Ric Flair and leaving him in the desert. After the video, they were attacked in the ring by Perry Saturn and Dean Malenko, who were members of the Revolution. The Animals' manager, Torrie Wilson, was kidnapped by Double D, who was introduced as Asya, the newest member of the Revolution. The name change was in reference to Chyna, who competed for WCW's rival the World Wrestling Federation, as well as implying that Asya was superior to Chyna since "Asia" is bigger than "China". Later on in the show, when the Filthy Animals attacked Malenko during a match against Chris Benoit, the Revolution used Torrie to blackmail the Animals into retreating.

On the November 8 episode of Nitro, Asya made her in-ring debut as she and Malenko defeated Rey Mysterio Jr. and Torrie Wilson in a mixed tag team match. Three days later, on Thunder, the Revolution interfered in a match between Sid and Perry Saturn before being taken down by Sid. Asya stood up to Sid, who attempted to powerbomb her but was attacked by Rick Steiner. The following week on Nitro, Asya defeated Kimberly Page by disqualification with rival Torrie Wilson as guest referee. Post-match, Asya confronted Torrie only to be slapped by her. Asya responded by throwing her out of the ring. Page then tried to help Torrie by jumping on Asya's back to apply a sleeper hold only for Asya to snapmare her down. Later on in the show, Kimberly attempted to choke Asya out with her belt, leading to Asya's former ally David Flair coming out with a crowbar in hand to ward off Kimberly. In a twist, Asya hit David with a sidewalk slam before trying to hit him with his own crowbar. Flair recovered and then suplexed her before hitting Revolution member Shane Douglas with his crowbar before leaving the ring.

The feud between the Filthy Animals and the Revolution concluded on November 21 at the Mayhem pay-per-view as Perry Saturn, Dean Malenko, and Asya defeated Eddie Guerrero, Billy Kidman, and Torrie Wilson in an elimination match, although Asya was the third competitor eliminated from the match.

Following the feud with the Filthy Animals, Asya began a string of several short-lived feuds. On the December 6 episode of Nitro, she wrestled fellow bodybuilder-turned-wrestler Midnight to a no contest. Following the match, Asya attacked Midnight until the Revolution came out and attacked Midnight with their flag. Three days later on Thunder, Asya fought "Hacksaw" Jim Duggan to a no contest. Asya finished her feud with Midnight as she, Saturn and Malenko defeated Midnight and Harlem Heat the following week on Nitro. At Starrcade, the Revolution (Shane Douglas, Perry Saturn, Dean Malenko, and Asya) defeated Jim Duggan and the newly reunited Varsity Club (Kevin Sullivan, Rick Steiner, and Mike Rotunda) after the Club turned on Duggan during the match. On the December 23 episode of Thunder, Asya, Saturn, and Malenko lost to Billy Kidman, Eddie Guerrero and Jim Duggan.

==== Face Turn ====
On the January 6, 2000 episode of Thunder, Asya became the second woman to challenge for the WCW Cruiserweight Championship facing then champion Madusa but lost after the Revolution turned on her. Asya then feuded with the Revolution during house shows, teaming up with Chavo Guerrero Jr. against Malenko and Saturn, losing to them twice before defeating them twice to end the feud.

On January 10, Oklahoma made misogynistic comments before saying that he could beat any woman in the ring and that he would go on to beat Cruiserweight Champion Madusa. In response, Asya came out to the ring and gave Oklahoma a beating before Madusa came out. Six days later at Souled Out, Asya and former Nitro Girl Spice attacked Oklahoma during his title match with Madusa. Oklahoma managed to roll up Madusa for the win but after the match, Asya and Madusa poured barbecue sauce over him.

After this, Asya began making sporadic appearances. On the April 15 episode of WorldWide, Asya lost to Mona via disqualification after Little Genie interfered. Post-match, both Asya and Genie attacked Mona before being pulled off by referees. On the May 3 episode of Thunder, both Mona and Asya were the only females in a battle royal between the Millionaire's Club and the New Blood to determine a contender for the World Heavyweight Championship, but they were both eliminated early on.

==== Alliance with Dale Torborg ====
On the June 14 episode of Thunder, Asya returned to WCW television disguised as a Sting fan at ringside. When Vampiro told her to remove her mask, she responded by spitting a red liquid into his face. Vampiro's opponent, The Demon (Dale Torborg), then appeared in the ring and the announcers revealed that The Demon and Asya were legit engaged. After Vampiro defeated the Demon, Asya tried to help her fiancé but received a Nail in the Coffin from Vampiro. The Demon chased Vampiro away before tending to Asya in the ring and later retired his Demon gimmick. Five days later on Nitro, Vampiro called out Torborg and asked him "don't you have something missing in your life?", leaving Torborg puzzled by the question before the lights went out. Asya, who had accompanied Torborg, disappeared, prompting Torborg to go after Vampiro. The lights went out again and Vampiro also disappeared, escaping in a black hearse. On the June 21 episode of Thunder, Torborg attacked Vampiro, demanding to know where Asya was. Instead, Vampiro told him he would never know unless he became the Demon again. Torborg then followed Vampiro to a gravesite that Vampiro said Asya was in there. Vampiro hit Torborg with a shovel before getting Asya out of the trunk of his hearse.

On the June 28 episode of Thunder, Vampiro came out proclaiming to have gotten rid of Sting, whom he was also feuding with, as well as Torborg and Asya. During his promo, the lights went out and Asya appeared in the ring before spitting a red liquid in his face as she did weeks prior. Torborg then attacked Vampiro with a baseball bat as the lights went out again and both Asya and Torborg were gone. The following week on Nitro, Asya was injured (in storyline) by an explosion during her entrance to the ring. Torborg wanted to tend to Asya in the hospital when a hooded figure (later revealed as Vampiro) handed him the Demon costume.

=== Retirement ===
On August 25, 2000, Wolf was released from her WCW contract.

== Personal life ==
Wolf graduated with a degree in biotechnology. Wolf married Dale Torborg on October 5, 2000. The couple had their first child, a daughter named Sierra Raye, on August 18, 2005.

== Other media ==
=== Filmography ===
- Ready to Rumble (2000) as "Asya"

== Championships and accomplishments ==
- Bodybuilding
  - 1995 NPC Florida State Championship – 1st (HW)
  - 1997 Ms. Florida Bodybuilding Championship – 1st
  - 1997 NPC USA Championship – 6th (MW)
  - 1997 Pro Invitational Strength Extravaganza Championship – 1st
  - 1998 NPC Nationals – 1st (HW)
  - 2001 Jan Tana Classic – 4th (LW)
