= Charles Robinson (referee) =

American professional wrestling referee and professional wrestler

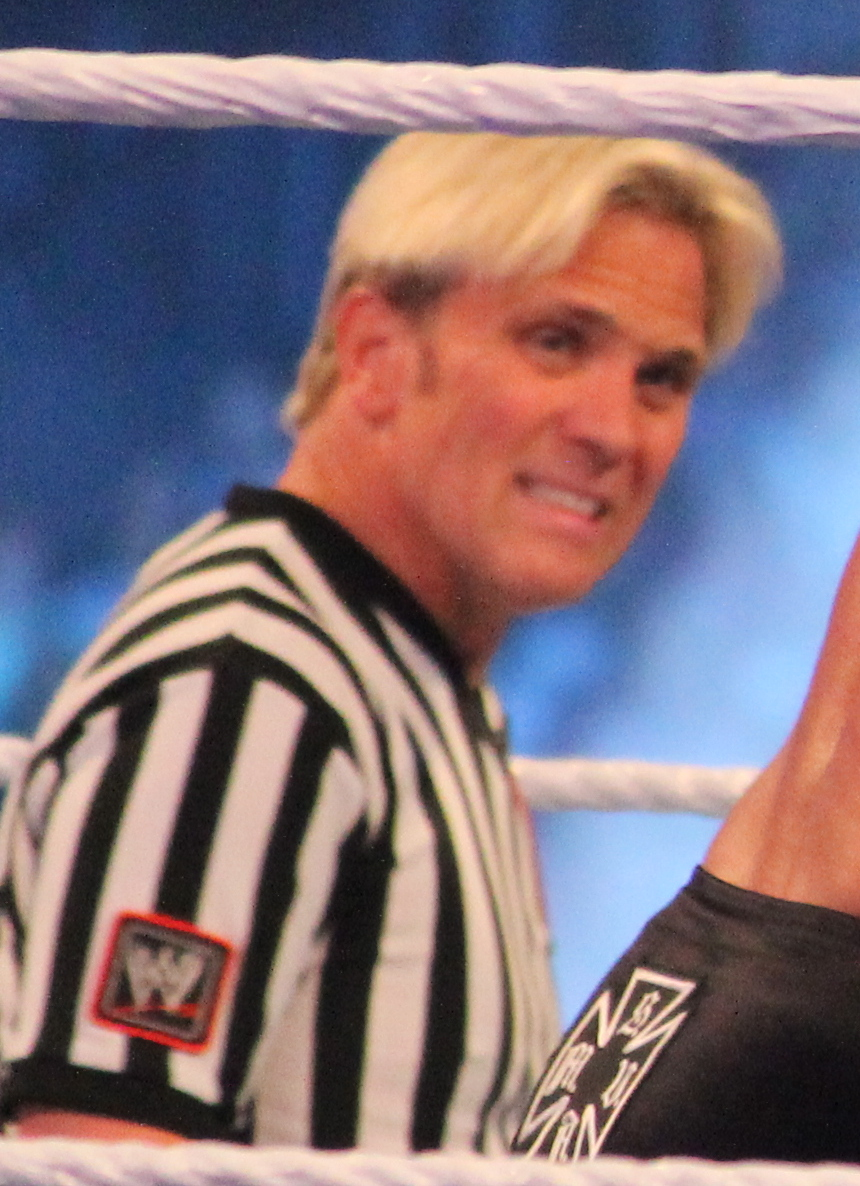
- Robinson in 2014

Personal information
- Born: Charles Shane Robinson; July 2, 1964 (age 62)
- Spouse: Amy Robinson (m. 2000; died 2002)
- Children: 1

Professional wrestling career
- Ring name(s): Charles Robinson; Little Naitch
- Billed height: 5 ft 6 in (168 cm)
- Billed weight: 150 lb (68 kg)
- Billed from: Charlotte, North Carolina
- Debut: 1995

Charles Shane Robinson (born July 2, 1964) is an American professional wrestling senior referee, ring crew member and former professional wrestler. He is signed to WWE on the SmackDown brand.

Robinson debuted in 1995 as a photographer before signing with World Championship Wrestling (WCW) in 1997. During his WCW run, he was referred to as "Little Naitch" as a reference to Ric "The Nature Boy" Flair. When WCW's assets were sold to the World Wrestling Federation in 2001, he debuted as an evil referee within The Alliance. After The Alliance was disbanded, he became the main referee for the SmackDown brand in 2002. Robinson became the brand's senior referee following the departure of Mike Chioda in 2020.

== Professional wrestling career ==
=== Pro Wrestling Federation (1995–1997) ===
While growing up, Robinson idolized NWA superstar Ric Flair. He also studied NWA referee Tommy Young in order to hone his mannerisms as a referee. His professional wrestling career began when he joined the Pro Wrestling Federation (PWF) as a photographer in 1995. After being used as a special guest referee in 1995, he later became a full-time referee for the PWF.

=== World Championship Wrestling (1997–2001) ===
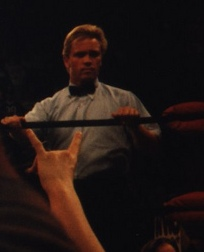
Robinson working for WCW in 1998

Robinson repeatedly petitioned the World Championship Wrestling (WCW) professional wrestling promotion for a job. On September 15, 1997, he was given a tryout match, refereeing a dark match between Chris Adams and Kendall Windham before WCW Monday Nitro at Independence Arena in Charlotte, North Carolina. A few weeks following the match, Robinson was contacted by WCW and signed to a contract. His first appearance was during the WCW TV tapings at Universal Studios in Orlando, Florida.

In 1999, Robinson became the heel referee of the Four Horsemen, aligning himself with Flair. Robinson frequently favored the Horsemen in the matches he officiated, enraging Randy Savage. Savage, who had been suspended by Flair (then the WCW president), proposed a match between his girlfriend, Gorgeous George, and Robinson, with Savage to be reinstated if George defeated Robinson. The match, which marked Robinson's wrestling debut, took place at Slamboree 1999 on May 9, 1999. Robinson, dubbed "Little Naitch" (a reference to Flair's nickname, the "Nature Boy"), came to the ring in a robe similar to those worn by Flair, and mimicked Flair's mannerisms, signature strut and "wooo" catchphrase. Robinson emulated Flair throughout the match, using Flair's customary illegal tactics, but was defeated by George, who pinned him following a diving elbow drop. Robinson wrestled his second match one week later, teaming with Flair to face Randy Savage and Madusa on an episode of WCW Monday Nitro. In the course of the match, Savage delivered a botched diving elbow drop to Robinson, cracking several of his vertebrae and collapsing his lung. After undergoing treatment, Robinson returned to WCW television several weeks later, and was appointed to President Flair's stable. Flair and Piper kayfabe ran WCW until they were unseated by Sting, with Robinson returning to his refereeing duties.

Robinson would again turn heel in the fall of 1999, this time siding with Sid Vicious and Rick Steiner. Robinson would get involved in matches he was refereeing for Vicious and Steiner. This would go on for a month before Robinson would go back to being an unbiased referee. In 2000, Robinson appeared in the WCW-produced film Ready to Rumble. On March 26, 2001, on Nitro, Robinson refereed the last WCW match ever, where Sting defeated Ric Flair via submission.

=== World Wrestling Federation / World Wrestling Entertainment / WWE (2001–present) ===
When WCW's properties were purchased by the World Wrestling Federation from AOL Time Warner in March 2001, Robinson was hired by the WWF. He debuted in the WWF as a member of The Alliance, bickering with WWF loyalist referee Jack Doan and accompanying senior WCW official Nick Patrick to ringside for his match at Invasion on July 22, 2001. He refereed his first WWF match on July 2, 2001. Despite being a member of the Alliance, Robinson, unlike fellow Alliance member Nick Patrick, was mostly a fair and impartial referee. An example of this would be the August 20, 2001 episode of Raw when he awarded Tajiri a victory over Booker T by disqualification when Booker T started choking Tajiri with his shirt. The night before at SummerSlam, Robinson refereed Booker T's match against the Rock and called the match right down the middle as the Rock won the WCW Championship.

In 2002, the WWF was renamed "World Wrestling Entertainment", and the roster was divided between two "brands", Raw and SmackDown!. Robinson was initially assigned to Raw, but was later traded to SmackDown!, where he refereed many women's matches. On the July 1, 2004, episode of SmackDown!, Robinson was forced to wrestle Luther Reigns by General Manager Kurt Angle. The match, however, was quickly stopped by Charlie Haas.

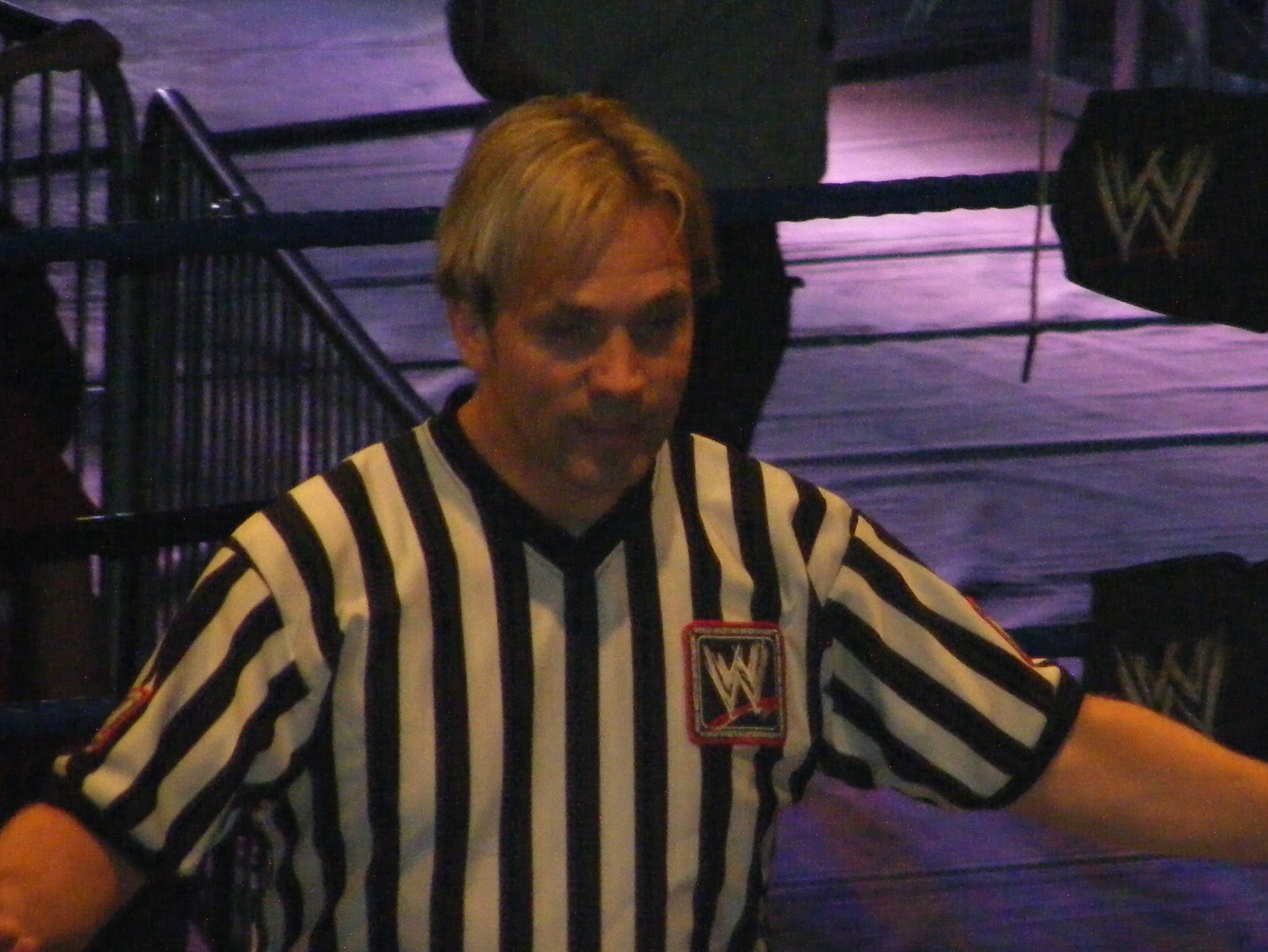
Robinson in the ring in 2009

At No Mercy 2006, Robinson, who had refereed a match between Mr. Kennedy and The Undertaker, was on the receiving end of a Tombstone Piledriver from the Undertaker after he had called for him to be disqualified after hitting Mr. Kennedy with his WWE United States Championship belt. Robinson also officiated the World Heavyweight Championship matches at WrestleMania 22, WrestleMania 23, as well as Ric Flair's final WWE match and the last part of the World Heavyweight Championship match at WrestleMania XXIV. Two years later he refereed the main event of WrestleMania XXVI, the retirement match of Shawn Michaels.

On the June 20, 2008, episode of SmackDown, Robinson was placed in a match by General Manager Vickie Guerrero after ejecting Chavo Guerrero Jr. from ringside during Bam Neely's match with Matt Hardy. He lost to The Great Khali in a squash match. After the match he was carried out by medical officials. He returned in a match between Edge and The Big Show, where he stopped Big Show from giving a con-chair-to to Edge. In November 2008 referees were made no longer exclusive to certain brands. Robinson has worked the final matches of Eddie Guerrero, Edge, and Shawn Michaels, as well as Ric Flair's WWE retirement match at WrestleMania XXIV. He also refereed Triple H's successful victory against Sting at WrestleMania 31. This was Sting's first match in WWE, and Sting personally chose Robinson as the referee. Robinson also refereed the match between Brock Lesnar and The Undertaker at SummerSlam where the match ended in controversy after Undertaker tapped out to Lesnar. Even though Robinson didn't see Undertaker tapping, the timekeeper saw it and rang the bell. Undertaker then hit Lesnar with a low blow and made Lesnar pass out to Hell's Gate. In a post-match backstage interview, Robinson admitted that, after watching the replays, Undertaker did tap out, but he also confirmed that it didn't matter if the timekeeper or the crowd saw it, and that as long as Robinson didn't call for the bell, the match would continue, due to him being the referee and the official. At Payback on May 1, 2016, he refereed the match between Charlotte (with her father Ric Flair) and Natalya (with Bret Hart) for the WWE Women's Championship. During the match, Robinson called for the bell when Charlotte had Natalya in the sharpshooter despite Natalya not submitting. This was similar to the Montreal Screwjob of Survivor Series 1997, when Bret Hart lost the WWF Championship. Robinson was one of the referees assigned to the inaugural WWE Cruiserweight Classic.

In 2016, Robinson has appeared as an uncredited cameo in the film Countdown.

Since 2002, Robinson has been a part of the WWE production and ring crew, helping assemble and disassemble the ring and set before and after shows.

In April 2020, Robinson became SmackDown`s senior official referee, after SmackDown's senior official referee Mike Chioda was released from his WWE contract as part of budget cuts stemming from the COVID-19 pandemic.

== Injuries ==
He once had his elbow knocked out of its socket while refereeing a match in the PWF in Gastonia, North Carolina. Fire Breaker Chip accidentally kicked Charles's elbow during a pin attempt. He was out of action for four months.

On April 18, 2014, while traveling with the WWE in Saudi Arabia, Robinson suffered a freak accident while helping assemble the wrestling ring, resulting in him nearly losing his thumb. The injury required six stitches.

On January 29, 2017, during the Royal Rumble PPV, Robinson was refereeing the WWE Championship Match between John Cena and AJ Styles when he tore the plantar fascia on his left foot seven minutes into the match. He completed the match, but was subsequently out of action for two months, during which he underwent successful surgery. He returned on March 25, 2017, during a WWE SmackDown Live house show in Johnson City. He made his television return on the March 28, 2017 episode of 205 Live.

On July 11, 2017, episode of SmackDown, Robinson's left index finger was mildly fractured by Baron Corbin while he refereed Corbin's match against Shinsuke Nakamura.

== Video games ==
Robinson's likeness appears as the referee in THQ's WWE Smackdown vs. Raw, WWE '12, WWE '13, and 2K Sports' WWE 2K14 and WWE 2K26 as both a choosable referee and a playable character.

== Personal life ==
On October 11, 2000, Robinson married a woman named Amy, who was diagnosed with melanoma of the lung in January 2001 and died on April 7, 2002. He has a daughter named Jessica from a previous relationship. Robinson is a Christian.

== Championships and accomplishments ==
- WWE
  - Slammy Award (1 time)
    - Referee of the Year (2020)
  - Bumpy Award (1 time)
    - Referee of the Year (2021)

Sporting positions
Preceded by Mike Chioda	WWE SmackDown Senior Referee; 2020–present	Succeeded by None
