= Molly Holly =

American professional wrestler

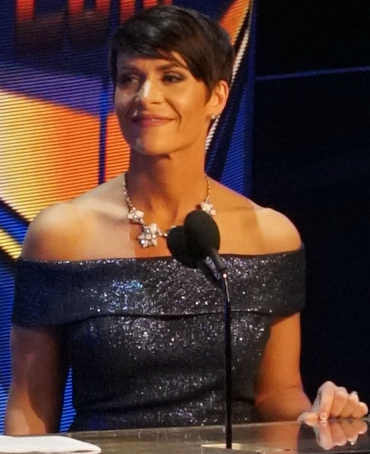
- Holly in 2021

Personal information
- Born: Nora Kristina Greenwald; September 7, 1977 (age 49) Forest Lake, Minnesota, U.S.
- Spouse: Geno Benshoof (m. 2010; div. 2024)

Professional wrestling career
- Ring name(s): Lady Ophelia; Mighty Molly; Miss Madness; Molly Holly; Mona; Nora Greenwald; Starla Saxon
- Billed height: 5 ft 4 in (1.63 m)
- Billed from: Forest Lake, Minnesota
- Trained by: Dean Malenko; Dudley Dudley; Dave Finlay
- Debut: 1997
- Retired: 2005

Signature
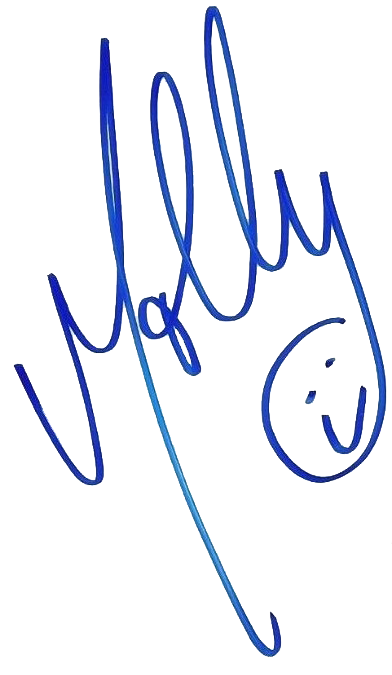

Nora Kristina Greenwald (born September 7, 1977) is an American retired professional wrestler. She is signed to WWE, under the ring name Molly Holly, as a producer. She is also known for her tenure in World Championship Wrestling (WCW) as Miss Madness and Mona from 1999 to 2000.

Holly began her professional wrestling career in WCW, where she also worked as a trainer. In 2000, Greenwald debuted in the then-WWF as part of The Holly Cousins stable, an alliance of storyline cousins. She was later aligned with The Hurricane. During her time with the WWF/WWE, Holly held the WWF Hardcore Championship once and the WWE Women's Championship twice.

Holly continues to make sporadic appearances in WWE, including competing at WWE Evolution and in the 2018 and 2020, and 2022 Women's Royal Rumble. Molly Holly was inducted into the WWE Hall of Fame in the 2021 class. She now serves as a backstage producer on WWE programming. She also holds short-term trainer roles in WWE LFG.

== Early life ==
Greenwald was born in 1977 to Rick and Bonnie Greenwald. She is named after her grandmother who she remained very close to her entire life. She has two brothers. Greenwald was interested in appearing on American Gladiators and trained to be a powerlifter from age 14 to age 18. At age 14, she broke the Minnesota state powerlifting record (75 pounds) for her age group by lifting 100 pounds. She also trained as a gymnast.

After she graduated from Forest Lake Area High School in 1996, Nora left home with $200 and a 1965 Oldsmobile, which she drove from Minnesota to Florida, worked at a Subway restaurant and as a telemarketer, and out of curiosity tried out for wrestling.

== Professional wrestling career ==
=== Early career (1997–1999) ===
Greenwald began training as a wrestler under Dean Malenko in Tampa, Florida, in 1997. She debuted on August 2, 1997, in the World Professional Wrestling Federation (WPWF) under the ring name Starla Saxton. Greenwald wrestled on the independent circuit throughout 1997 and 1998, winning two championships. On August 21, 1998, she defeated Malia Hosaka to win the New Dimension Wrestling Women's Title, but lost it one day later back to Hosaka.

She appeared with both World Championship Wrestling and the World Wrestling Federation as Starla Saxon, unsuccessfully challenging Jacqueline for the WWF Women's Championship on an October 1998 episode of Sunday Night Heat and on an episode of the U.K. version of Shotgun. In late 1999, she briefly feuded with Brandi Alexander while wrestling in the Florida independent circuit.

=== World Championship Wrestling (1999–2000) ===
Greenwald debuted in WCW as the evil Miss Madness, one of Randy Savage's valets along with Gorgeous George and Madusa. Savage asked Greenwald and Madusa to train his then-girlfriend Gorgeous George in real life, highlights of which were shown on WCW television. As part of the storyline, this villainous alliance, called Team Madness, would interfere in matches for the benefit of Savage. Behind the scenes, Greenwald and Madusa trained the other women of WCW at the WCW Power Plant. Eventually, Savage betrayed Miss Madness by firing her from Team Madness along with Madusa after a championship loss. She then became Mona, a fan favorite, who wore a beauty pageant sash, tiara, white gloves, and heels to the ring and wrestled barefoot in a blue cocktail dress. She embarked on mini-feuds with Madusa, Little Jeannie, and Asya. Independent female wrestlers, such as Dee Dee Venturi and Brandi Alexander, were also brought in to wrestle Mona. WCW released Greenwald, however, in August 2000 in a cost-cutting move. In her final televised match, she teamed with Shawn Stasiak against Chris Candido and Tammy Sytch on the May 16, 2000, episode of WCW Worldwide.

=== World Wrestling Federation/Entertainment/WWE (2000–present) ===
==== Lady Ophelia (2000) ====
Upon signing a contract with the World Wrestling Federation, she was sent to their training ground in Memphis Championship Wrestling to work off ring-rust. She became the manager of William Regal and was known as Lady Ophelia. While there, she squared off against The Kat, Bobcat, and Victoria. In 2000, she reappeared in the World Wrestling Federation under the Lady Ophelia gimmick, wrestling dark matches and valeting for William Regal.

==== The Holly Cousins (2000–2001) ====
Greenwald, however, had her first major run in the company as Molly Holly, where she joined her on-screen cousins Bob Holly and Crash Holly. At the time, The Holly Cousins were involved in a feud with T & A (Test, Albert, and manager Trish Stratus). Greenwald says that Stratus was one of her favorite people with whom to work. Molly's arrival on the November 6, 2000, edition of Raw started a short feud with Stratus, where Molly would beat Stratus on the November 16 episode of SmackDown! for her first televised victory over Stratus. Her first PPV appearance was in a Six-Person intergender tag team match at Survivor Series on November 19. On the November 23 episode of SmackDown!, Holly used the Molly-Go-Round finisher for the first time and defeated Stratus again. In 2001, Molly formed an on-screen relationship with Spike Dudley, in the midst of their storyline rivalry between her cousins and Spike's brothers (The Dudley Boyz). In interviews in subsequent years, Greenwald recalled the "relationship" with Spike Dudley as the "best time of her career." A subsequent fallout between her and Crash even led to an intergender singles match, with Molly pinning Crash.

==== Mighty Molly (2001–2002) ====
In September 2001, Molly dumped Spike to become Mighty Molly, the superhero sidekick of The Hurricane. Molly, however, eventually left The Hurricane to become a full-time solo wrestler, taking his Hardcore Championship after whacking him with a frying pan at WrestleMania X8 on March 17, 2002, in Toronto, Ontario, Canada. She promptly lost it to Christian an hour later after getting a door slammed in her face.

==== Women's Champion (2002–2003) ====
After splitting up with The Hurricane in April 2002, she returned to her previous ring name, Molly Holly. Upon her return to the newly renamed World Wrestling Entertainment (WWE), she drastically changed her look by shortening her trademark blonde hair and darkening it to autumn brown. Greenwald's reasoning behind this was that it fit her new character better. Greenwald adopted a villainous, self-righteous prude character, who was appalled by the other WWE Divas continually using their "assets" and degrading themselves. During this gimmick, she would often refer to herself as being "pure and wholesome."

After turning heel, Holly began her first rivalry as a villain with Trish Stratus after she attacked her in a post-match assault on the April 1, episode of Raw, by breaking a paddle over Stratus head. On the April 15, episode of Raw, Holly was defeated by Trish Stratus in a number one contenders match to Jazz's Women's Championship. On the May 6, episode of Raw, Holly was defeated by Terri in a Diva's showdown contest, after wearing a covered swim suit and claiming to have dignity as Terri was dressed with a more revealing swim suit, before attacking her and being stopped by Jerry Lawler, this led to a match between both of them the following week on the May 13, episode of Raw, where Holly emerged victorious. Following this, her feud with Stratus further escalated after Trish provoked Molly by making fun of Molly's large bottom on the June 10 episode of Raw, which led to a match that same night, where Holly defeated Stratus in a non–title match. The rivalry led to a match at King of the Ring on June 23 for Trish's Women's title, where Molly successfully captured it for the first time after pinning Stratus by hooking her tights. The following night on Raw, Holly teamed up with Jackie Gayda for a tag team match and stated that she finally had brought back dignity to the Women's title by not being a "tramp who sleeps her way to the top" referring to Stratus, before being defeated by Trish and Linda Miles. On the July 15, episode of Raw, Holly successfully defended her title against Trish Stratus. After multiple intergender tag team matches throughout mid-July, August and early September including the first intergender tag team tables match between both Molly and Stratus who started an alignment with Bubba who competed along with her, Trish received a rematch for Molly's Championship on September 22 at Unforgiven, where she dropped the title back to Stratus. The following night on Raw, Holly tried to regain her title during a triple–threat match against Victoria and Stratus in an unsuccessful attempt, to end their feud. During this feud, Jerry Lawler also began to poke fun at Greenwald's bottom-heavy figure, which Greenwald later revealed genuinely hurt her feelings in real-life, Greenwald, however, initially did not mind the storyline when Stephanie McMahon approached her with the idea.

After ending her feud with Stratus, Holly started competing in various singles and tag team matches until the end of 2002 and early 2003 including a second triple–threat match for the Women's Championship on October 28, episode of Raw, ending on both winning and losing sides.

==== Alliance with Gail Kim (2003–2005) ====
Molly earned her second Women's Championship by defeating Gail Kim on Raw on July 28, 2003. Kim later turned villainous and joined Molly in her feud with Stratus. During an attack on Stratus, Lita made her return, helping Trish fend off her attackers. Holly and Kim then lost a tag team match to Lita and Trish at Unforgiven, sparking a feud with Lita. This feud led to a match against Lita at Survivor Series for the Women's title, which Holly retained.

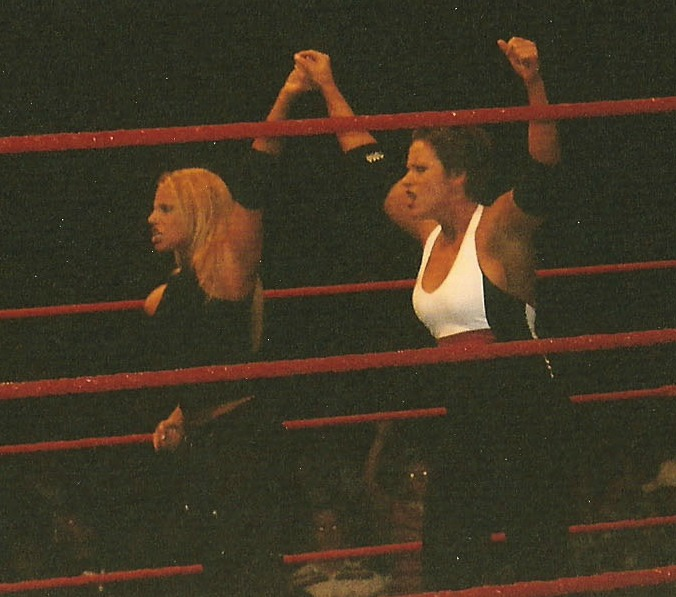
Holly (right) along with Trish Stratus during a WWE house show in October 2004

Molly lost her championship to Victoria in a Four-Way Elimination match on February 23, 2004. The feud led to a Hair versus Title match at WrestleMania XX in March 2004, which Molly lost, resulting in her having her head shaved. Greenwald maintains that it was her idea to have her head shaved, suggesting the idea to Vince McMahon months before the match occurred because she wanted to do something shocking at WrestleMania. Over the next few months, in storyline, she desperately tried to disguise her bald head using loose-fitting wigs. Eventually on the April 19 episode of RAW, Molly's bald head was revealed during a match against Victoria, causing her to snap and choke Victoria unconscious. Later in 2004, Molly feuded with Stacy Keibler, overpowering Stacy on the mat and pinning her in three consecutive occasions, the last one occurring in a number one contender's match.

Molly Holly's final WWE pay-per-view appearance occurred at Taboo Tuesday in 2004 as she appeared in the Fulfill Your Fantasy Battle Royal along with many other WWE Divas. The fans voted online for the Divas to wear schoolgirl uniforms, as opposed to French maid or nurse outfits. In contrast to the other girls who wore sexy schoolgirl uniforms, Molly wore a demure 1980s-style schoolgirl uniform with large pink panties underneath. Molly failed to win the match when Stratus eliminated her by tossing her through the ropes for the win. Molly's efforts in subsequent attempts to regain the title failed. Due to several wrestlers from the company's women's division being released in late 2004 and the introduction of the Raw Diva Search program, Molly was mostly left off television, only occasionally appearing on Sunday Night Heat and Raw in losing efforts to the likes of Lita, Victoria, Trish Stratus, and Christy Hemme.

Greenwald left WWE and a full-time wrestling career in April 2005. Reportedly, she was beginning to become disenchanted with WWE, who began to focus on looks rather than wrestling ability. She also hated that her character had become a villain, but that was not the direct cause of her leaving the company. Greenwald stated that all of the aforementioned reasons were incorrect, but she would like to keep the real reason she left WWE private. She decided to take a break from WWE and spend some time with her family and enjoy life.

==== Sporadic appearances and Hall of Fame (2007–present) ====
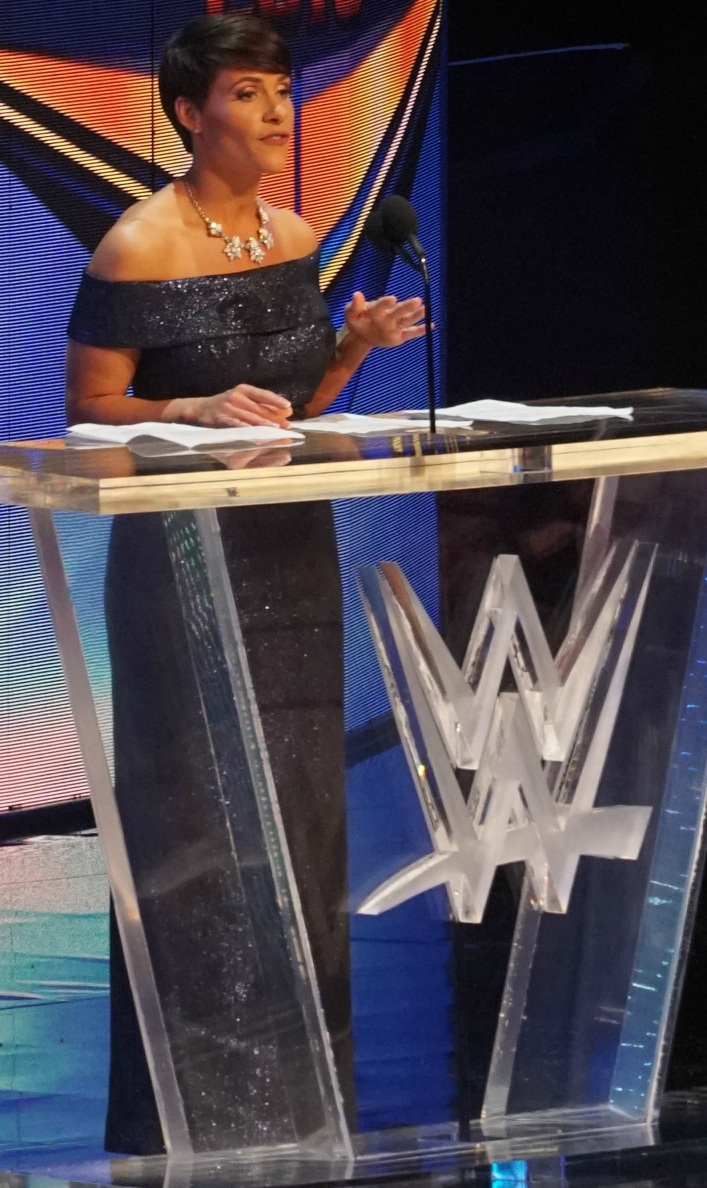
Molly Holly in April 2018 during her introductory speech to present the female Hall of Famer of the 2018 WWE Hall of Fame Ivory

In December 2007, at the Raw 15th Anniversary, Holly returned during a backstage segment with William Regal, Mickie James, and Hornswoggle.

On April 5, 2009, at WrestleMania 25, Holly returned to compete on the 25-Diva Royal to crown Miss WrestleMania, which was won by Santina Marella.

On January 27, 2016, she appeared on WWE Network's program Table for 3, along with Alundra Blayze and Ivory. She appeared once again on the program this time along with Candice Michelle and Michelle McCool, which aired on May 18.

On January 28, 2018, at the Royal Rumble, Holly made a surprise entrance at number 12 during the first women's Royal Rumble match, in which she eliminated Sarah Logan before being eliminated by Michelle McCool. On April 6, she inducted Ivory into the WWE Hall of Fame as part of the 2018 class. Molly also competed in the 20-women battle royal at the first ever all women's pay-per-view, WWE Evolution. She returned reprising her "Mighty Molly" gimmick at the Royal Rumble on January 26, 2020, entering at number 3 before being eliminated by Bianca Belair. She also made an appearance on the Raw Legends Night special on January 4, 2021.

On March 10, 2021, Holly was announced as the first inductee into the 2021 WWE Hall of Fame. She has since worked as a producer for the company.

On January 29, 2022, Mighty Molly was a surprise entrant at the Royal Rumble match but was quickly eliminated by Nikki A.S.H following a sneak attack during her entrance.

=== Independent circuit (2005–2007, 2018) ===
On November 20, 2005, Greenwald made her first public appearance since her WWE departure at Northern IMPACT Wrestling's first ever card at the Veterans of Foreign Wars Hall in her hometown of Forest Lake, Minnesota. On January 8, 2006, in Amery, Wisconsin, Greenwald made her first in-ring appearance in nine months, appearing with Northern IMPACT Wrestling, a local Minnesota/Wisconsin wrestling promotion. In addition to refereeing a match between Rain and Ann-Thraxx (Ann Brookstone), Greenwald counted the pin for the main event match between Team Revolution and Team Invasion. She went on to referee an Impact Zone Wrestling match on February 14, 2006, in Tempe, Arizona, and an XJAM Wrestling match on February 16, 2006, in Minot, North Dakota, where she challenged Ann-Thraxx to wrestle her, with Ann-Thraxx refusing. On April 8, 2006, Greenwald appeared at the German Stampede Wrestling event International Impact III in Olsberg, Germany, commentating on a match along with former Pro Wrestling Illustrated senior editor Bill Apter and refereeing a women's match. In subsequent months, she made (non-wrestling) appearances at several independent wrestling events.

On October 7, 2006, Greenwald returned to in-ring action for the first time since April 2005 by defeating Jonny Fairplay after a quick low blow and pinfall in a WCWA event.

Nora returned to several events as guest referee or for autograph signings. She first refereed an intergender match between Kassy Summers and Seito Hayashi for BAW Championship Wrestling on July 13, 2007, in McMinnville, Oregon, then was guest referee in a match between Ann-Thraxx and TNA's Christy Hemme for Heavy on Wrestling in Superior, Wisconsin, on July 21. Greenwald is one of the stars of the wrestling documentary, Bloodstained Memoirs.

On August 31, 2018, Nora reprised her "Mighty Molly" gimmick and took part in Chikara's King of Trios event.

=== Legacy ===
Holly was honored in a sign of respect by wrestler Beth Phoenix on March 31, 2017, during the latter's Hall of Fame induction, in which Phoenix noted that Holly put her in touch with Nick Dinsmore and Nightmare Danny Davis, who helped to train her. Phoenix also mentioned that Holly had quietly paid her tuition so that she could chase her dreams. Phoenix then posited that strong women are the ones who build each other up instead of tearing each other down, and that Holly was such a woman.

== Other media ==
Holly has appeared in 12 WWE video games. She made her in-game debut at WWF SmackDown! Just Bring It and appears in WWF Raw, WWE WrestleMania X8, WWE SmackDown! Shut Your Mouth, WWE Raw 2, WWE Day of Reckoning, WWE SmackDown! vs. Raw, WWE 2K20 as unlockable from MyRise mode in WWE 2K23, and as an unlockable in WWE 2K24, WWE 2K25, WWE 2K26. as well as the WWE Champions and WWE SuperCard mobile games.

== Personal life ==
In 2002, Greenwald competed on a special edition of Fear Factor, where she was eliminated in the second round. She won $10,000 for Prison Fellowship Ministries. In August 2005, she released an autobiographical DVD entitled "Nora Greenwald: Shootin' the ~~Shi~~ Crap" that detailed the reasons behind her departure. A portion of the profits from the sale of the DVD went to the education fund of the daughter of Mike Lockwood, her onetime on-screen cousin, after his death.

After leaving the wrestling business, Greenwald has made sporadic wrestling appearances, acts as a landlady with regards to her property holdings, invests in real estate, and performs charity work. On December 16, 2006, Nora went to Guatemala for several months to learn Spanish and complete missionary work. In addition, she took public speaking classes and earned a license in massage therapy. Greenwald now works for Minnesota Teen Challenge, a one-year residential drug and alcohol rehabilitation program. She joined the program because at least ten of her friends have died because of drug overdoses. Greenwald, a born again Christian, ministers to the women in the program. In January 2009, Greenwald participated in The Polar Bear Plunge, where she voluntarily submerged herself in freezing water to raise money for the Special Olympics Minnesota. She has also been a bus aide for special needs children and worked with recovering addicts at Teen Challenge. According to fellow wrestler Maven, Greenwald is one of the rare wrestlers he met who is straight edge, a rarity in an era in which steroids and pharmaceutical drug use ran rampant.

In July 2010, she announced her engagement to Geno Benshoof, whom she met while working as a teen counsellor. The couple were married in the backyard of Benshoof's parents' house in White Bear Lake, Minnesota, on July 22, 2010.

Greenwald was formerly the female lead coach at The Academy: School of Professional Wrestling, a training facility led by fellow WWE alumni Ken Anderson, current AEW wrestler Ariya Daivari, current WWE producer Shawn Daivari, and independent professional wrestler Arik Cannon.

== Championships and accomplishments ==
- Cauliflower Alley Club
  - Women's Wrestling Award (2013)
- New Dimension Wrestling
  - NDW Women's Championship (1 time)
- World Professional Wrestling Federation
  - WPWF Women's Championship (1 time)
- Women Superstars Uncensored
  - WSU Hall of Fame (Class of 2010)
- World Wrestling Federation / World Wrestling Entertainment / WWE
  - WWE Women's Championship (2 times)
  - WWF Hardcore Championship (1 time)
  - WWE Hall of Fame (Class of 2021)

== Luchas de Apuestas record ==
Winner (wager)	Loser (wager)	Location	Event	Date	Notes
Victoria (championship)	Molly Holly (hair)	New York City, New York	WrestleMania XX	March 14, 2004	
