= Ready to Rumble =

2000 film by Brian Robbins

- Theatrical release poster
- Directed by: Brian Robbins
- Written by: Steven Brill
- Produced by: Bobby Newmyer; Jeffrey Silver
- Starring: David Arquette; Oliver Platt; Scott Caan; Bill Goldberg; Rose McGowan; Diamond Dallas Page; Joe Pantoliano; Martin Landau
- Cinematography: Clark Mathis
- Edited by: Ned Bastille
- Music by: George S. Clinton
- Production companies: Bel Air Entertainment; Outlaw Productions; Tollin/Robbins Productions
- Distributed by: Warner Bros. Pictures
- Release date: April 7, 2000 (United States)
- Running time: 107 minutes
- Country: United States
- Language: English
- Budget: $24 million
- Box office: $12.5 million

Ready to Rumble is a 2000 American buddy sports comedy film directed by Brian Robbins and written by Steven Brill, which is based on Turner Broadcasting System's now defunct professional wrestling promotion, World Championship Wrestling (WCW). The film stars David Arquette, Oliver Platt, Scott Caan, Bill Goldberg, Rose McGowan, Diamond Dallas Page, Joe Pantoliano and Martin Landau.

The film draws its title from ring announcer Michael Buffer's catchphrase, "Let's get ready to rumble!", and features many wrestlers from WCW. Ready to Rumble was produced by Bel Air Entertainment, Outlaw Productions and Tollin/Robbins Productions and released by Warner Bros. on April 7, 2000. The film received negative reviews from critics and was a box office bomb, grossing $12.5 million against a $24 million budget, but the film has now become a cult classic over time among wrestling fans.

== Plot ==
Sewage workers Gordie Boggs and Sean Dawkins watch their favorite wrestler, undefeated and undisputed WCW World Heavyweight Champion Jimmy King, get cheated out of the title by Diamond Dallas Page (DDP), promoter Titus Sinclair, and DDP's wrestling stable at a Monday Nitro event. After the match, the duo expresses their rage while driving in their septic truck, resulting in a car crash which they survive.

Gordie starts believing that the crash was supposed to happen and that they should make Jimmy King once again the WCW World Heavyweight Champion. Looking for King, they travel to his hometown of Atlanta, hitching a ride from singing nuns with flatulent problems, and find his parents and estranged wife. King's parents tell Gordie and Sean that King borrowed their mobile home and never returned it. During this time, they learn that King's entire wrestling bio was fabricated. The duo later finds King residing in a mobile park. He has completely given up on wrestling, and they provoke him until he attacks them. This attack prompts a change of heart for King, and his passion for wrestling returns.

King, Gordie, and Sean go on a road trip to the next Monday Nitro taping in New York City. Gordie and Sean arrive disguised as septic workers and meet Nitro Girl Sasha. When DDP mocks King on camera, King comes out of the port-a-potty and attacks him. Sinclair then declares a Title vs. Career Steel Cage match for the WCW World Heavyweight Championship plus a $1 million cash prize. Sasha is impressed by Gordie, and they later go to her apartment to have dinner. Sasha attempts to have sex with Gordie, who reacts like it is a wrestling match and pushes her off of him. Gordie sends letters to his father, a police officer who wanted Gordie to follow in his footsteps. Gordie writes that he will not join him in the force and that he lost his virginity.

King is out of shape for the match, so he, Gordie, and Sean head to the residence of retired wrestling legend Sal Bandini, who agrees to be King's trainer. The trio heads to a gym, where King meets his former partner, Bill Goldberg. King asks Goldberg to help in the upcoming match, but Goldberg turns him down, saying that King has no chances of winning. That night, Sid Vicious and Perry Saturn attack Sal and hospitalize him and are injured themselves in the process. At the hospital, Gordie overhears Sasha at a phone booth and learns that she is working as a spy for Sinclair. Realizing their relationship was a sham, Gordie breaks up with her.

The trio head back to Georgia to visit King's wife, who kicks him in the crotch for giving her crabs and abandoning her and their son. The couple eventually reconciles on her porch. King's teenage son then comes out, revealing that he has bad teeth. King vows to win the money and get him a good dentist. As the trio returns to Gordie and Sean's hometown of Lusk, Wyoming, to continue training, they recruit new members to King's wrestling stable, while Gordie's father forces him to abandon his wrestling aspirations and join the police force. Sean and King try to convince Gordie to get out of becoming an officer, but he refuses. He does, however, hold a party for King and wishes him luck in the Steel Cage match, while Sean hooks up with Wendy, a fast-food drive thru employee.

On the night of the match at the Royal Bash Pay-per-view in Las Vegas, King and DDP face off in a 3-layer steel cage with the title belt hanging on a wire at the top, and King is once again outnumbered by DDP's goons, including King's own son. King receives help from Goldberg, Booker T, Billy Kidman, Disco Inferno, Sting (who had been instructed by Sinclair to aid DDP), and Gordie, who rides in on a police motorcycle, debuting his new gimmick as "The Law". During the match, Sasha attempts to reconcile with Gordie. King wins the match by dropping DDP from the top of the cage to the floor of the ring and retrieving the belt. As King comes up victorious by regaining the WCW World Heavyweight Championship, Sinclair gets beaten up by Sean and Gordie (as well as by the fans). Goldberg later asks King to re-team with him, but King rejects the offer and announces his new partner will be Gordie, and their manager will be Sean "Suga Daddy" Dawkins.

Sean later tells the local kids "dreams can come true" at a convenience store, where Gordie, Goldberg, and King teach the clerk a lesson for being mean to kids by hurling him out on the street. The heroes then ride off in a limousine, together with a fully-recovered Sal, in a hot tub with two of the Nitro Girls.

== Cast ==
- David Arquette as Gordie Boggs a.k.a. "The Law", a sewage worker and aspiring wrestler
- Oliver Platt as Jimmy King, a washed up boozy former wrestling champion urged by Gordie and Sean to return to wrestling
- Scott Caan as Sean Dawkins a.k.a. "Sugar Daddy", Gordie's best friend and co-worker
- Rose McGowan as Sasha, a Nitro Girl who Gordie hooks up with
- Richard Lineback as Mr. Boggs, Gordie's father who is a state trooper pressuring his son to be a cop
- Chris Owen as Isaac, a die hard fan of King who helped Gordie and Sean in searching for him
- Joe Pantoliano as Titus Sinclair, the corrupt WCW GM who set Kings downfall in motion
- Martin Landau as Sal Bandini, a legendary wrestler who trains King
- Caroline Rhea as Eugenia King, Jimmy's estranged wife
- Tait Smith as Frankie King, Jimmy's distant son
- Ellen Albertini Dow as Mrs. MacKenzie, an elderly lady in Lusk who is a customer to Gordy and Sean and is known to dress provocatively
- Kathleen Freeman as Jane King, Jimmy's mother
- Lewis Arquette as Fred King, Jimmy's father
- Ahmet Zappa as Cashier
- Jill Ritchie as Brittany, Sean's ex-girlfriend
- Melanie Deanne Moore as Wendy, Brittany's co-worker who has a thing for Sean

=== Wrestling personalities ===
- Bill Goldberg
- Diamond Dallas Page
- Steve "Sting" Borden
- Booker T
- Randy Savage
- Bam Bam Bigelow
- Sid Vicious
- Juventud Guerrera
- Curt Hennig
- Disco Inferno
- Billy Kidman
- Konnan
- Rey Mysterio Jr.
- Perry Saturn
- Prince Iaukea
- Van Hammer
- Gorgeous George
- John Cena
- Announcers Michael Buffer, Gene Okerlund, Tony Schiavone and Mike Tenay
- Referees Charles Robinson and Billy Silverman
- The Nitro Girls: Chae, Fyre, Spice, Storm, Tygress
- Chris Kanyon makes a cameo appearance as a fan in the end, wearing an Insane Clown Posse shirt, who jeers and helps beat up Sinclair when tossed into the fans.

== Publicity ==
Following the release of the movie, WCW decided to generate publicity for the company by running a storyline in which David Arquette, a legitimate wrestling fan, became WCW World Heavyweight Champion. The storyline was reviled by wrestling fans, and Arquette himself reportedly believed it was a bad idea, as he felt that it would damage the value of the WCW World Heavyweight Championship he held in such high regard. While in WCW, he aligned himself with Diamond Dallas Page (despite Page being the movie's villain) and agreed (in storyline) to drop the title to him. He eventually lost the title in the main event of Slamboree involving the three-tiered cage seen in Ready to Rumble, pitting himself against Page and Jeff Jarrett, which ended when he turned on Page and allowed Jarrett to win. Arquette later donated all the money WCW paid him to the families of deceased wrestlers Owen Hart, Brian Pillman, and Brian Hildebrand and to wrestler Darren Drozdov who was left paralyzed due to an in-ring accident a year prior.

The Triple Cage was used by WCW only twice: first, at Slamboree 2000, Jeff Jarrett beat Diamond Dallas Page and David Arquette (defending the WCW World Heavyweight Championship) to win the title. In this match, Chris Kanyon was thrown from the roof of one of the cages, "paralyzing" him. The other, taking place on the September 4, 2000 episode of WCW Monday Nitro, was the 2000 edition of the WarGames match.

== Reception ==
=== Box office ===
The film grossed $12.5 million against its $24 million budget, making it a box-office failure. During its release, WCW was struggling in ratings and revenue, due in large part to creative and financial missteps as well as the creation of the Attitude Era in the World Wrestling Federation (WWF, now WWE), which lead to the WWF's dominance over their rival promotion. While this film did not necessarily contribute to the demise of WCW, many thought of Ready to Rumble as a failed last-ditch effort to try and save WCW. Most of WCW's assets, except for the corporate subsidiary itself, were purchased by the WWF nearly a year later on March 23, 2001.

=== Critical reception ===
Ready to Rumble received a largely negative reception from critics. On the review aggregator website Rotten Tomatoes, 23% of 71 critics' reviews are positive, with an average rating of 4/10. The website's consensus reads: "Humor at its lowest that isn't funny for kids and is insulting to adults." Metacritic, which uses a weighted average, assigned the film a score of 23 out of 100, based on 26 critics, indicating "generally unfavorable" reviews. Audiences surveyed by CinemaScore gave the film a grade "B−" on the scale of A to F.

Roger Ebert said that the movie works best when focusing on the aspects of professional wrestling instead of the "wheezy prefab" Dumb and Dumber antics and felt there was misuse of both Platt and Landau, citing the former's comedic talents being wasted and having an actual wrestler in his place instead, and the latter being more suitable in dramatic works. BBC film reviewer Neil Smith commended the efforts of both Platt and Landau in their respective roles but felt the film overall was the typical Hollywood comedy, consisting of "oafish slapstick and lavatorial humour in place of genuine wit or imagination", concluding that it "has its moments, but ultimately feels just as bogus as the Lycra-clad charlatans it lionises." The A.V. Club's Nathan Rabin criticized the filmmakers for trying to satirize and indulge in the world of wrestling and ignore it for rehashed humor from films like The Wedding Singer and Mallrats, concluding that, "[I]n its attempts not to offend wrestling fans or the wrestlers who make brief, bland appearances, Ready To Rumble is plodding, obvious, toothless, and unfunny."

A. O. Scott of The New York Times mockingly said that the film does a deep exploration into the world of professional wrestling and its core fanbase, but in reality is "not a satire of the idiocy [of professional wrestling], but a long, self-satisfied wallow in it." Chris Gramlich of Exclaim! backhandedly called it "the best Hollywood wrestling movie since No Holds Barred", giving credit to Chris Kanyon's wrestling choreography, the various WCW performers and the contributions from both Landau and McGowan being the film's saving graces, concluding that, "While Ready to Rumble may at times make even the most ardent wrestling ashamed by its use of wrestling stereotypes (some even justified); it does make you laugh almost as often. Almost." The Austin Chronicle's Marjorie Baumgarten agreed with the critics about the "asinine plot, premise, and performances" but admitted to laughing at a few moments that shows the film being honest with itself about its creation, concluding that, "Filled with lots of appearances by real wrestling stars, the movie seems a certain shoo-in among a certain demographic. But if you're going, hit the theatres soon because this one looks ready to tumble."

== Music ==
Ready to Rumble

Soundtrack album
- Released: April 11, 2000
- Length: 45:47
- Labels: Atlantic; 143

The film score makes extensive use of classical music, both diegetic and non-diegetic. "Fanfare for the Common Man" by Aaron Copland is featured as Jimmy King's theme music. "Siegfried's Funeral March" from Götterdämmerung by German composer Richard Wagner plays quietly in the background during King's initial discomfiture at the hands of Titus Sinclair, played by Joe Pantoliano, and Diamond Dallas Page.

A soundtrack for the film was released by Atlantic Records and 143 Records in both 'clean' and 'explicit' editions. As the Lower Than You remix of Kid Rock's "Badwitdaba", appears on the iTunes version of this soundtrack, it remained one of the only songs of Kid Rock to be available on iTunes, until most of his catalog was released on iTunes in 2013.

No.	Title	Music	Artist	Length
1.	"Get Ready"		Josh Abraham / Troy Van Leeuwen	3:39
2.	"Bloodstains" (Agent Orange)	Mike Palm	The Offspring	1:53
3.	"We're Not Gonna Take It" (Twisted Sister)	Dee Snider	Bif Naked	3:32
4.	"Bawitdaba [Lower Than You Remix]"		Kid Rock	3:49
5.	"King of Rock"		Run–D.M.C.	5:13
6.	"Diamond Dallas Page Theme (King of Ba-Da-Bing)"	Dweezil Zappa	Dweezil Zappa	2:26
7.	"Freestyle [Remix]"		P.O.D.	3:51
8.	"Jump Around"		House of Pain	3:38
9.	"We Will Rock You" (Queen)	Brian May	DJ Hurricane, Scott Weiland	3:07
10.	"Last Resort"		Papa Roach	3:22
11.	"Sting Theme"	Jimmy Hart / Howard Helm	George S. Clinton	2:38
12.	"...Baby One More Time" (Britney Spears)	Max Martin	Ahmet Zappa, Dweezil Zappa	4:11
13.	"Girls, Girls, Girls"		Mötley Crüe	4:28
Total length:				45:47
