= Dale Torborg =

American professional wrestler and baseball player (born 1971)

Personal information
- Born: Dale Christian Torborg; October 24, 1971 (age 54) Mountainside, New Jersey
- Spouse: Christi Wolf (m. 2000)

Professional wrestling career
- Ring name(s): The MVP; The Kiss Demon; The Demon; Dale Torborg
- Billed height: 6 ft 7 in (201 cm)
- Billed weight: 275 lb (125 kg)
- Trained by: DeWayne Bruce; WCW Power Plant; The Warlord; Jim Neidhart
- Debut: 1998
- Retired: October 25, 2021

Dale Christian Torborg (born October 24, 1971) is an American baseball trainer and professional wrestler. In wrestling, he is best known for portraying the Kiss themed character, The Demon. He is the son of Major League Baseball manager Jeff Torborg. He was the strength and conditioning coordinator for the Chicago White Sox from 2003 until 2022.

== Baseball career ==
Torborg attended Northwestern University, and played college baseball for the Northwestern Wildcats. He played professional baseball after graduating from college. His career began in 1994 with the Kingsport Mets of the Appalachian League. According to Torborg, he suffered two injuries that led to the end of his baseball career. The first occurred when he attempted to pickoff a runner while playing first base. Torborg broke his humerus bone when his arm was tangled with the base runner's arm. Torborg's final injury, which proved to be career ending, occurred when took a fastball to the face which broke his zygomatic bone and caused a change in his depth perception.

== Professional wrestling ==
=== World Championship Wrestling (1998–2001) ===
In 1995, Torborg worked for the American Wrestling Federation as The MVP, a baseball player character. After the AWF dissolved he was hired by World Championship Wrestling and sent to the WCW Power Plant to train alongside Bill Goldberg, Lodi, Chuck Palumbo, Mark Jindrak, Jimmy Yang, Evan Karagias, Shane Helms, Allan Funk, Christie Wolf, and Ron Reis. He and Chad Fortune were briefly a tag team known as "The Pit Crew". In 1998, after two matches as The MVP, he was asked to portray a character named The Demon, a gimmick modeled on the stage persona of Kiss bassist Gene Simmons. The gimmick was initially assigned to Brian Adams who never wrestled as the character, after which it was given to Torborg. He was managed by Asya (Christi Wolf).

The "Demon" character was originally supposed to be the beginning of a stable called The Warriors of Kiss, in which the other original members of the band would have a wrestler representing their look and gimmick. Kiss was guaranteed their "Demon" themed wrestler would wrestle a Main Event match with the contract they made with WCW. This was supposed to happen at a special 1999 New Year's Eve PPV against Vampiro. The PPV and the match were taken off the table, however, after Eric Bischoff lost his position in September 1999. In order to fulfill the contractual obligation, he was booked in a "Special Main Event" match at Superbrawl in early 2000. Uncharacteristic to "Main Event" matches, it was the fourth match on the card and saw Torborg face The Wall which saw The Wall win with a chokeslam. Because Bischoff lost his position before the character's wrestling debut, The Demon character got off to a rocky start, losing to Terry Funk in its debut. Bookers at the time wanted to make Eric Bischoff look bad. Torborg contends that the character was hurt because the Kiss concert to debut The Demon was one of the lowest rated segments in the history of WCW Nitro up to that point and even though Bischoff believed in the character, others believed it was dead on arrival.

Afterwards, he was known simply as "The Demon" and placed in a stable with Vampiro and the Insane Clown Posse called The Dark Carnival. He later turned against the group and feuded with Vampiro.

When WCW was bought out by the then-World Wrestling Federation in 2001, Torborg opted to go back to baseball as a strength coach and not do his scheduled tryout for the WWF. In November 2001, Torborg worked for Xcitement Wrestling Federation only wrestling two matches before he retired from the sport.

=== Total Nonstop Action Wrestling/Impact Wrestling (2005–2007, 2021, 2023) ===
Torborg appeared with White Sox catcher A. J. Pierzynski on an episode of TNA Impact! on December 8, 2005, along with veteran wrestling manager and color commentator Bobby Heenan. Torborg and Pierzynski presented A.J. Styles, Chris Sabin and Sonjay Dutt with memorabilia from the 2005 World Series until they were interrupted by The Diamonds in the Rough. Simon Diamond, the leader of the Diamonds and himself a former baseball player, mocked Pierzynski's .256 batting average, telling him that he needed a designated hitter. Diamond then slapped Torborg, leading to a brawl. As a result, Torborg, Sabin and Dutt, with Pierzynski in their corner, faced the Diamonds at Turning Point 2005 on December 11. At Turning Point, Dutt pinned Diamond following interference from then-Boston Red Sox outfielder Johnny Damon.

On the January 18, 2007 edition of iMPACT!, Pierzynski and Torborg attacked Lance Hoyt, helping James Storm win, who was also aided by Miss Tennessee. At Against All Odds 2007 Torborg, with Pierzynski in his corner, was defeated by Hoyt, who had David Eckstein in his corner. Torborg and Pierzynski's appearance were some of the highest-rated episodes for TNA.

On October 23, 2021 Torborg made a brief return to wrestling at Bound For Glory Pay-Per-View where he appeared as The Demon in a Gauntlet For The Gold match, where he was eliminated by Ace Austin. He went on to appear on the November 18, 2021 edition of Impact Wrestling, teaming with Decay to defeat Johnny Swinger, Fallah Bahh, and Hernandez. He appeared again on November 25, 2021 edition as part of the Wrestle House 2 special, where he again interacted with Swinger.

He returned again on the February 16, 2023 edition of Impact during Swinger’s match against Barry Horowitz, causing Swinger to lose.

== Baseball coaching ==
When WCW was purchased by the World Wrestling Federation in March 2001, Torborg left wrestling and joined the Montreal Expos as a coach. His duties with the Expos included strength and conditioning coaching, assisting with infield drills and batting practice pitcher. At the time his father, Jeff Torborg, was the manager of the Expos.

Torborg later served as the strength and conditioning coach for the Florida Marlins during his father's tenure as manager from 2002 to 2003. He made news when he scared Marlins pitcher Antonio Alfonseca into hiding in a trainer's room after Alfonseca swore at him in Spanish while refusing Torborg's request for a weigh-in.

In January 2004, Dale was hired by the Chicago White Sox baseball team as a roving strength trainer. Torborg has been a part of two World Champion baseball teams: 2003 Marlins and 2005 White Sox.

Torborg had a small role in the film Transporter 2, as well as numerous commercials over his acting career. He also worked with Tom Selleck for the movie Mr. Baseball, as well as with Madonna and Geena Davis for the movie A League of Their Own.

== Personal life ==
Torborg married Christie Wolf on October 5, 2000. The couple had their first child, a daughter named Sierra Raye on August 18, 2005.
