= Randy Savage =

American professional wrestler (1952–2011)

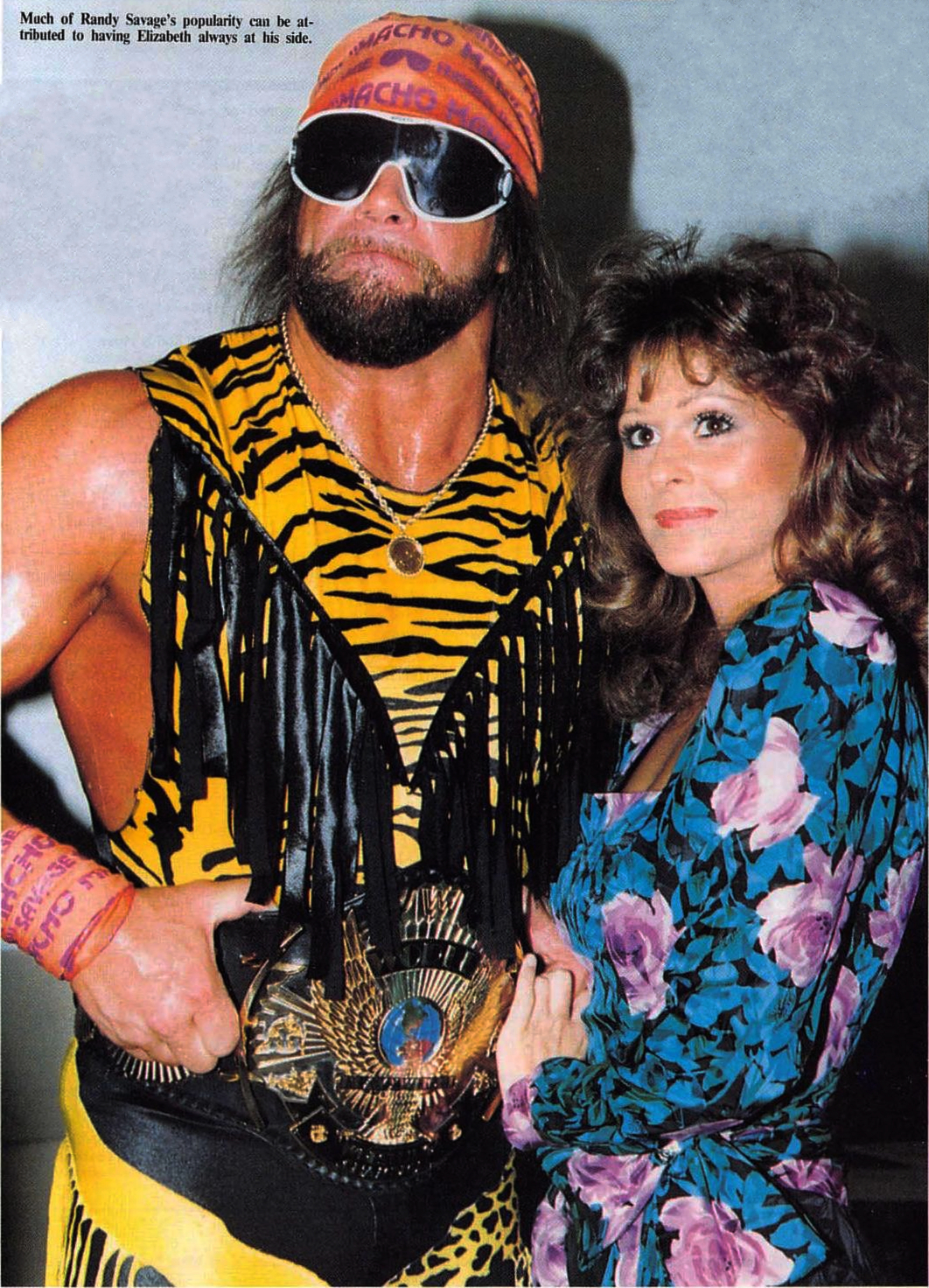
- Savage as WWF Champion alongside Miss Elizabeth in 1988

Personal information
- Born: Randy Mario Poffo; November 15, 1952 Columbus, Ohio, U.S.
- Died: May 20, 2011 (aged 58) Seminole, Florida, U.S.
- Spouses: Elizabeth Ann Hulette (m. 1984; div. 1992); Lynn Payne (m. 2010)
- Father: Angelo Poffo
- Family: Lanny Poffo (brother)

Professional wrestling career
- Ring name(s): Randy Poffo; Randy Savage; The Spider; The Big Geno; Mr. Madness; Destroyer; Executioner
- Billed height: 6 ft 2 in (188 cm)
- Billed weight: 237 lb (108 kg)
- Billed from: Sarasota, Florida
- Trained by: Angelo Poffo
- Debut: 1973
- Retired: 2006

Randy Mario Poffo (November 15, 1952 – May 20, 2011), better known by his ring name "Macho Man" Randy Savage, was an American professional wrestler, rapper, and professional baseball player. He is best known for his time in the World Wrestling Federation (WWF, later WWE) and World Championship Wrestling (WCW).

Savage was described by sportswriter Bill Simmons as "one of the greatest pro wrestlers who ever lived" – a statement echoed by multiple industry performers. He was recognizable by wrestling fans for his distinctively flamboyant ring attire and raspy voice, intensity exhibited in and out of the ring, use of the finale from "Pomp and Circumstance March no. 1" by Edward Elgar as his entrance music, and signature catchphrase, "Oooh yeah!" For most of his tenures in the WWF and WCW, Savage was managed by his real-life wife, Miss Elizabeth.

Savage had ten world championship reigns during his 32-year career, including two as WWF World Heavyweight Champion and four as WCW World Heavyweight Champion. As WWF Champion, he had drawing power equal to that of wrestling great Hulk Hogan. A one-time WWF Intercontinental Heavyweight Champion, he was named by WWE as the greatest titleholder of all time and credited for bringing "a higher level of credibility to the title through his amazing in-ring performances".

Savage was the 1987 WWF King of the Ring and the 1995 WCW World War 3 winner. He headlined many pay-per-view events throughout his career, including WrestleMania IV and WrestleMania V, two of the first five SummerSlam shows, the 1988 Survivor Series and Starrcade '95: World Cup of Wrestling. He was inducted into the Wrestling Observer Newsletter Hall of Fame upon its inception in 1996, with a posthumous WWE Hall of Fame induction following in 2015.

== Early life ==
Randy Poffo was born on November 15, 1952, in Columbus, Ohio, the eldest son of Judith (née Sverdlin) and Angelo Poffo. His father was Italian American and his mother was Jewish American; Poffo was raised Catholic. Randy's father was a well-known wrestler in the 1950s and 1960s, and his younger brother Lanny Poffo also went into wrestling.

The Poffo family lived in Zanesville, Ohio, where Randy attended Grover Cleveland Middle School. He graduated from Downers Grove North High School in the Chicago suburb of Downers Grove, Illinois. Poffo later moved to Staten Island, New York, before moving to Lexington, Kentucky, where he lived for many years. Some sources list him as an alumnus of Southern Illinois University–Carbondale, though the university stated in 2011 that it found no records of him attending.

== Baseball career ==
Savage was signed by the St. Louis Cardinals organization as a catcher out of high school. He was placed in the minor leagues to develop, where he mostly played as an outfielder in the Cardinals and Cincinnati Reds farm systems. Savage was 18 when he began playing minor league baseball; one of his teammates on the 1971 Gulf Coast League Cardinals was Larry Herndon, who was also his roommate. Savage would swing a bat into a hanging car tire to strengthen his hands and utilize his legs during swings. The technique was so effective that Herndon used it during his career as a baseball coach. Savage injured his natural (right) throwing shoulder after a collision at home plate, and he learned to throw with his left arm instead. Savage's last season was 1974, when he played for the Class A Tampa Tarpons in the Reds organization. He played 289 games over four minor league seasons, batting .254 with 16 home runs and 129 runs batted in.

== Professional wrestling career ==
=== Early career (1973–1983) ===
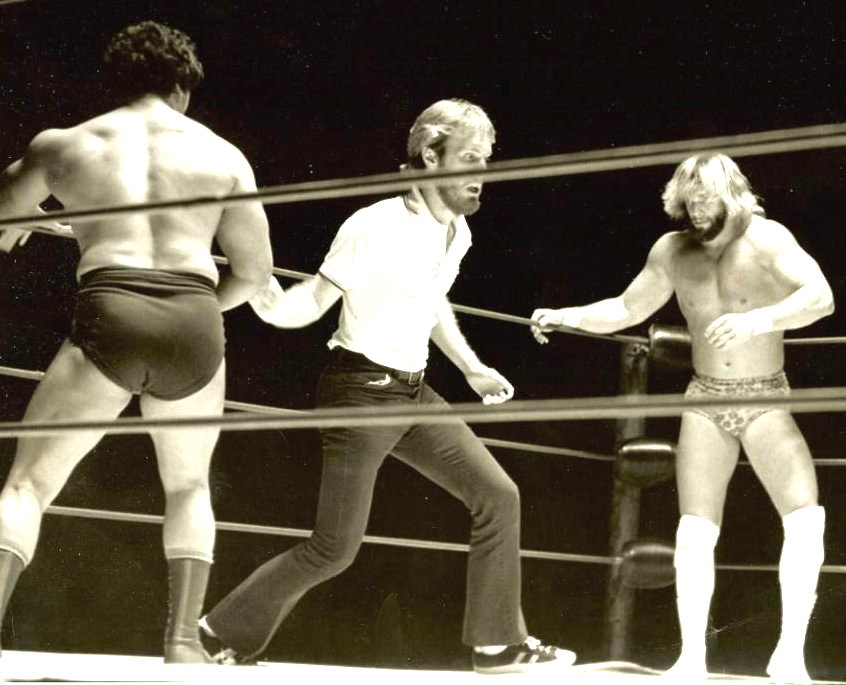
Savage (right) prepares to face off against Roberto Soto in a match held in Macon, Georgia, on August 23, 1977.

Savage first broke into the wrestling business in 1973 during the fall and winter of the baseball off-season. His first wrestling character, The Spider, was similar to Spider-Man. He later took the ring name Randy Savage at the suggestion of his longtime friend and trainer Terry "The Goose" Stephens and Georgia Championship Wrestling (GCW) booker Ole Anderson, who said that the name Poffo did not fit someone who "wrestled like a savage". Savage eventually decided to end his stalled baseball career and join his father and brother to wrestle full time. He wrestled his first match against Midwest Territory wrestler "Golden Boy" Paul Christy. Savage worked with his father and brother in Michigan, the Carolinas, Georgia, the Maritimes, and the eastern Tennessee territory run by Nick Gulas.

After a while, his father felt that his sons were not getting the pushes they deserved so he started the "outlaw" International Championship Wrestling (ICW) promotion in the mid-American states.

=== Continental Wrestling Association (1983–1985) ===
In December 1983, Savage began wrestling for Jerry Jarrett and Jerry Lawler's Continental Wrestling Association (the ICW's former competitor). Immediately after debuting, he began feuding with Lawler over the AWA Southern Heavyweight Championship. On December 26, Savage defeated Terry Taylor to win the NWA Mid-America Heavyweight Championship for a second time (he had previously held the title twice in 1978–1979).

In January 1984, Savage and his father Angelo entered a tournament for the AWA Southern Tag Team Championship, but were eliminated by the Rock 'n' Roll Express. Throughout early 1984, Savage successfully defended his NWA Mid-America Heavyweight Championship against challengers such as Dutch Mantel, Rick McGraw, and Bugsy McGraw, as well as continuing to pursue Lawler's AWA Southern Heavyweight Championship. Savage's reign ended on April 9, 1984, when he lost to Lawler in a "loser gets ten lashes" match in the Rupp Arena in Lexington, Kentucky. On April 23, 1984, Savage defeated Austin Idol for the AWA International Heavyweight Championship. He held the title until May 14, when Idol regained it.

Throughout mid-1984, Savage competed in the tag team division, teaming with his brother Lanny. The brothers had a series of matches against the Rock 'n' Roll Express; this feud included a match on June 25, 1984, in Memphis, Tennessee, where Savage injured Ricky Morton by piledriving him through the timekeeper's table, leading to the Express winning by disqualification.

In September 1984, Savage turned babyface and allied with Lawler against Jimmy Hart's First Family. In late 1984, Savage and Poffo had a series of matches against father-son duo Tommy Gilbert and Eddie Gilbert, including several coal miner's glove matches; the feud culminated in a loser leaves town match in the Mid-South Coliseum on November 27 that the brothers won. They also faced teams such as the Long Riders (Bill Irwin and Scott Irwin) and the Interns. In January 1985, they entered a tournament for the AWA Southern Tag Team Championship, being eliminated by the Interns.

In early-1985, Savage had a short feud with Adrian Street. In March 1985, he turned heel on Lawler again and resume his feud with him over the AWA Southern Heavyweight Championship. On March 17, 1985, Savage finally defeated Lawler for the AWA Southern Heavyweight Championship. In April 1985, Savage and Poffo had a series of matches against AWA Southern Tag Team Champions the Fabulous Ones, including several lumberjack matches, but were unable to win the titles. On May 7, Savage lost his AWA Southern Heavyweight Championship to Jerry Oske; he regained the title on May 13. On June 3, Savage lost the title back to Lawler in a no disqualification loser leaves town match in the Mid-South Coliseum in Memphis, Tennessee. On June 6, Savage lost a second loser leaves town match to Lawyer in the Rupp Arena in Lexington, Kentucky; this marked his final appearance with the CWA before he joined the World Wrestling Federation later that month.

=== World Wrestling Federation (1985–1994) ===
Savage's entrance theme music Pomp and Circumstance in D, No. 1, Edward Elgar

==== Intercontinental Heavyweight Champion (1985–1987) ====
In June 1985, Savage signed with Vince McMahon's World Wrestling Federation (WWF). He made his WWF debut on the July 6 episode of Championship Wrestling, defeating local competitor Aldo Marino. Billed as "the top free agent in pro wrestling", Savage's first appearances on Tuesday Night Titans featured several established managers (including Bobby "The Brain" Heenan, Jimmy Hart, Mr. Fuji, Johnny Valiant, and "Classy" Freddie Blassie) offering their services to Savage. He declined their offers and chose Miss Elizabeth as his new manager on the August 24 episode of Championship Wrestling. His gimmick was a crazed, ego-maniacal bully who mistreated Miss Elizabeth and threatened anyone who even looked at her. He made his pay-per-view (PPV) debut for a 16-man tournament at The Wrestling Classic on November 7, defeating Ivan Putski, Ricky "The Dragon" Steamboat, and the Dynamite Kid before losing via countout in the finals to Junkyard Dog.

In late 1985, Savage started a feud with then-Intercontinental Heavyweight Champion Tito Santana over that title. During the November 2 episode of Saturday Night's Main Event III, he unsuccessfully challenged Santana for the title (Savage won the match by countout, but not the title because the title did not change hands by countout). In a rematch on WWF on NESN on February 8, 1986, he won the WWF Intercontinental Heavyweight Championship at the Boston Garden by using an illegal steel object stashed in his tights to knock out Santana. Early in his WWF career, Savage also won three countout victories (the first at the Spectrum in Philadelphia and the other two at Madison Square Garden) over his future tag team partner WWF World Heavyweight Champion Hulk Hogan (although the belt did not change hands due to the countout) as well as engaging in feuds with Bruno Sammartino and George "The Animal" Steele.

Savage's feud with Steele began on the January 4 episode of Saturday Night's Main Event IV, when Steele developed a crush on Miss Elizabeth. At WrestleMania 2 on April 7, 1986, Savage defeated Steele in a match to retain his Intercontinental Heavyweight Title. He resumed his feud with Steele in early 1987, culminating in two Intercontinental Heavyweight title matches, both won by Savage. His next feud was with Ricky Steamboat, where in October, Savage crushed Steamboat's throat against a guardrail. On March 29, 1987, Savage wrestled Steamboat at WrestleMania III in the Pontiac Silverdome. After 19 two-counts, Steamboat pinned Savage (with help from George Steele, who pushed Savage from the top rope seconds before he was pinned) to end his near 14-month reign as Intercontinental Heavyweight Champion. The match was extremely choreographed, as opposed to the "on the fly" nature of most wrestling matches at the time; Savage was a stickler for detail, and he and Steamboat laid out and rehearsed every spot in the match prior to WrestleMania. The match was named 1987's Match of the Year by both Pro Wrestling Illustrated and the Wrestling Observer and is regarded as one of the greatest WrestleMania matches of all time. Steamboat and Savage were seen cheering with and hugging other wrestlers after the match. The two continued to feud on house shows, including in steel cage matches. During this part of his career, he became known for his stage costumes, which were created by Florida designer Michael Braun.

==== WWF Champion (1988–1989) ====
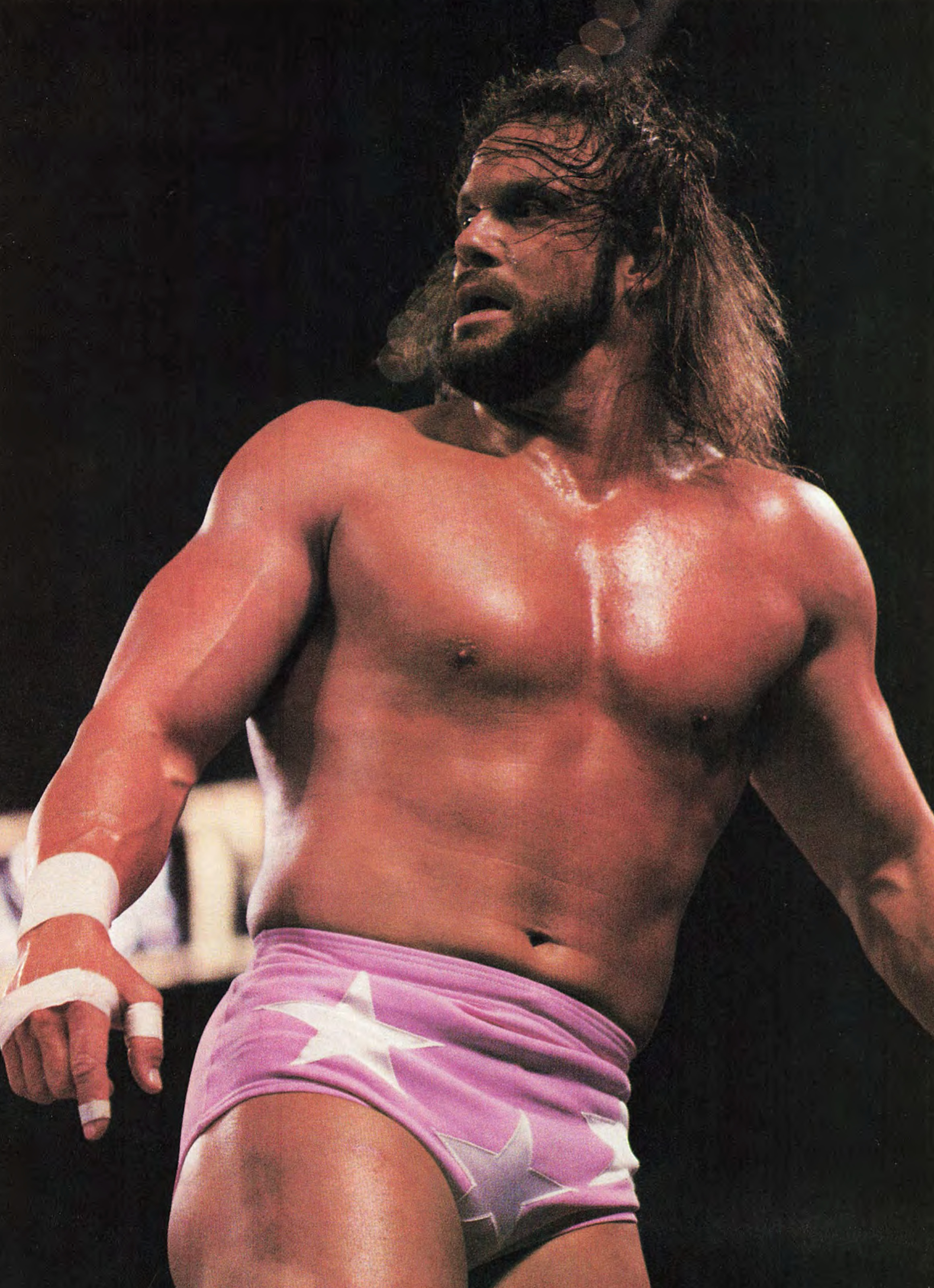
Savage in 1988

Savage won the King of the Ring tournament later in 1987. His popularity was rising to the point that he was being cheered by a majority of the fans despite being a heel, so he became less hostile towards the fans and Miss Elizabeth. When The Honky Tonk Man declared himself "the greatest Intercontinental Heavyweight Champion of all time", Savage began a feud with him to get the title back, becoming a fan favorite in the process. On the October 3 episode of Saturday Night's Main Event XII, he got his shot at The Honky Tonk Man and the Intercontinental Heavyweight Championship, but lost out on the title when The Hart Foundation (Bret "Hitman" Hart and Jim "The Anvil" Neidhart), who along with Honky were managed by "The Mouth of the South" Jimmy Hart, interrupted the match, getting Honky disqualified. In the ensuing beatdown, Miss Elizabeth ran back to the locker room and brought Hulk Hogan out to the ring to save Savage, leading to the formation of "The Mega Powers". Savage would lead a team of five against Honky's team of five at the first annual Survivor Series on November 26, where Savage's team was victorious, avenging Elizabeth's honor. His feud with Honky continued into early 1988, where in their last high-profile matchup (aired as the undercard to André the Giant vs. Hulk Hogan on the February 5 episode of The Main Event I), Savage defeated Honky by count-out after he shoved Honky away from Elizabeth and into the ring post.

At WrestleMania IV on March 27, 1988, he participated in the 14-man tournament for the vacant WWF World Heavyweight Championship. During the tournament held at the Boardwalk Hall in Atlantic City, Savage defeated "The Natural" Butch Reed, Greg "The Hammer" Valentine and the One Man Gang on his way to the finals, where he defeated "The Million Dollar Man" Ted DiBiase (who had André the Giant in his corner), pinning him with the help of Hogan. Savage retained the WWF World Heavyweight Title for a little over a year, defending it against the likes of One Man Gang, Big Boss Man and André the Giant.

The Mega Powers' first feud was against The Mega Bucks (Ted DiBiase and André the Giant), whom they defeated on August 29 in the main event of the first ever SummerSlam pay-per-view. The match, refereed by Jesse Ventura, was famous for Miss Elizabeth jumping up on the apron of the ring late in the match and removing her skirt to show red panties. This allowed both Savage and Hogan (who had been knocked to the outside) to get back in the ring and get the pin on DiBiase with Savage pushing a reluctant Ventura to the 3-count. The Mega Powers then began feuding with The Twin Towers (Big Boss Man and Akeem who was formerly the One Man Gang). In the case of the latter feud, Savage frequently became involved in Hogan's matches involving one of the two villains (and vice versa); the two rival factions captained opposing teams in the main event of the Survivor Series on November 24, which was won by the Mega Powers.

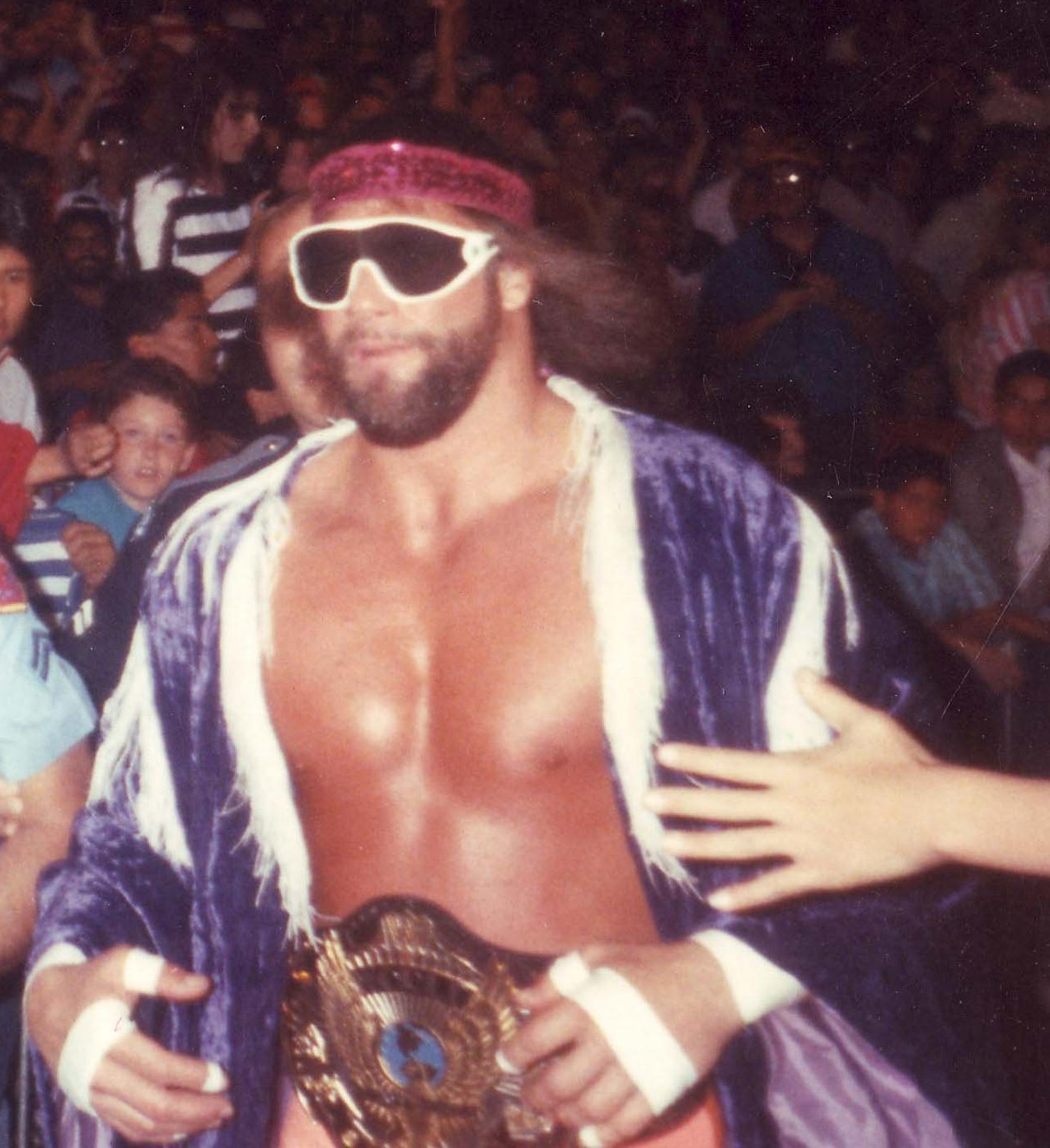
Savage during his reign as WWF Champion in March 1989

Problems between Savage and Hogan developed in early 1989 after Hogan also took Elizabeth as his manager. On January 15, 1989, at the Royal Rumble, Hogan accidentally eliminated Savage from the Royal Rumble match and they started to fight until Elizabeth separated them. During the February 3 episode of The Main Event II, Savage and Hogan faced the Twin Towers, but Elizabeth accidentally got injured at ringside. Hogan carried her to the back, which enraged Savage to the point that he abandoned Hogan later in the match. Savage and Hogan got into a heated argument with Savage declaring that Hogan was an inferior wrestler to him and that he wanted to steal Elizabeth from him. He then proceeded to attack his partner and attacked Hogan's friend Brutus "The Barber" Beefcake as he tried to intervene, before being separated by security, turning Savage heel.

On April 2 at WrestleMania V, Savage dropped the WWF World Heavyweight Championship to Hogan after a reign of 371 days. Prior to the match, Savage had actually been hospitalized with an infected elbow but checked himself out of the hospital in order to wrestle Hogan and despite wearing a heavy bandage over the elbow and being sick as a result of the infection, still managed to put on a high quality showing. Later that month, he replaced Elizabeth (who stayed with Hogan) as his manager with former WWF Women's Champion Sensational Sherri. Savage co-main evented SummerSlam on August 28, teaming with "The Human Wrecking Machine" Zeus (actor Tiny Lister in character as his role from Hulk Hogan's movie, No Holds Barred), against The Mega-Maniacs (Hogan and Brutus Beefcake), with the Mega-Maniacs winning after Hogan hit Zeus with Sherri's loaded purse to get the win. Savage and Zeus faced Hogan and Beefcake in a rematch contested in a steel cage at No Holds Barred on December 27, but were again defeated.

==== Macho King and retirement (1989–1991) ====
Meanwhile, as all of this was going on, Savage decided to challenge Jim Duggan for the King of the Ring title in September 1989, defeating him; Savage began referring to himself as "The Macho King" going forward, with Sherri becoming known as "Sensational Queen Sherri".

Savage and Hogan met one final time on February 23, 1990, at The Main Event III, with Hogan once again putting the WWF Championship on the line. The pinfall was counted by new heavyweight boxing champion Buster Douglas despite Savage kicking out at two, Douglas then punched Savage in the face after Savage confronted and then slapped Douglas.

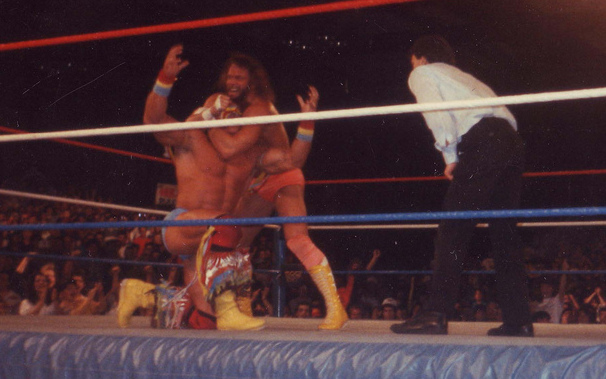
Savage wrestling Ultimate Warrior on March 7, 1989, at the El Paso Civic Center. Ultimate Warrior would go on to retire him at WrestleMania VII.

Savage then began feuding with the "Common Man" Dusty Rhodes, losing a mixed tag match (along with Sherri) to Rhodes and Sapphire on April 1 at WrestleMania VI but beating him in a singles match on August 27 at SummerSlam.

After this, Savage started a feud with Ultimate Warrior, who had defeated Hogan to win the WWF Championship at WrestleMania VI. Warrior repeatedly refused to give Savage a title shot, instead choosing to defend the championship against Sgt. Slaughter at the Royal Rumble in January 1991. Savage attacked Warrior as he was making his entrance, and then later in the match knocked him unconscious by breaking his royal scepter over Warrior's head, costing him the championship.

Warrior responded by challenging Savage to a career-ending match at WrestleMania VII on March 24, where the loser of the contest would be forced to retire from professional wrestling. Savage lost the match, and was then attacked by Sherri as he lay dejected in the ring. This was too much for Miss Elizabeth, who happened to be in the audience, rushing to Savage's aid, fighting off Sherri and reuniting with her one-time love to huge crowd appreciation, with Savage becoming a fan favorite once again.

Despite his retirement from active wrestling, Savage stayed in the WWF in a non-wrestling capacity while Ultimate Warrior was fired by Vince McMahon after SummerSlam later that year. Savage wrestled a number of times following WrestleMania VII and the WWF's official story was that out of respect, Warrior generously allowed him to see out the final months of his contract before he was forced to retire. His last match was on April 1 in Kobe, Japan at a joint card between the WWF and Super World Sports, where he was defeated by Genichiro Tenryu. He also made an initial, untelevised return to the ring on July 30 in Portland, Maine, at a WWF Wrestling Challenge taping when he substituted for Ultimate Warrior and pinned The Undertaker. Following this, Savage subbed for Warrior on house shows in early August against Undertaker.

==== Color commentator, reinstatement and departure (1991–1994) ====
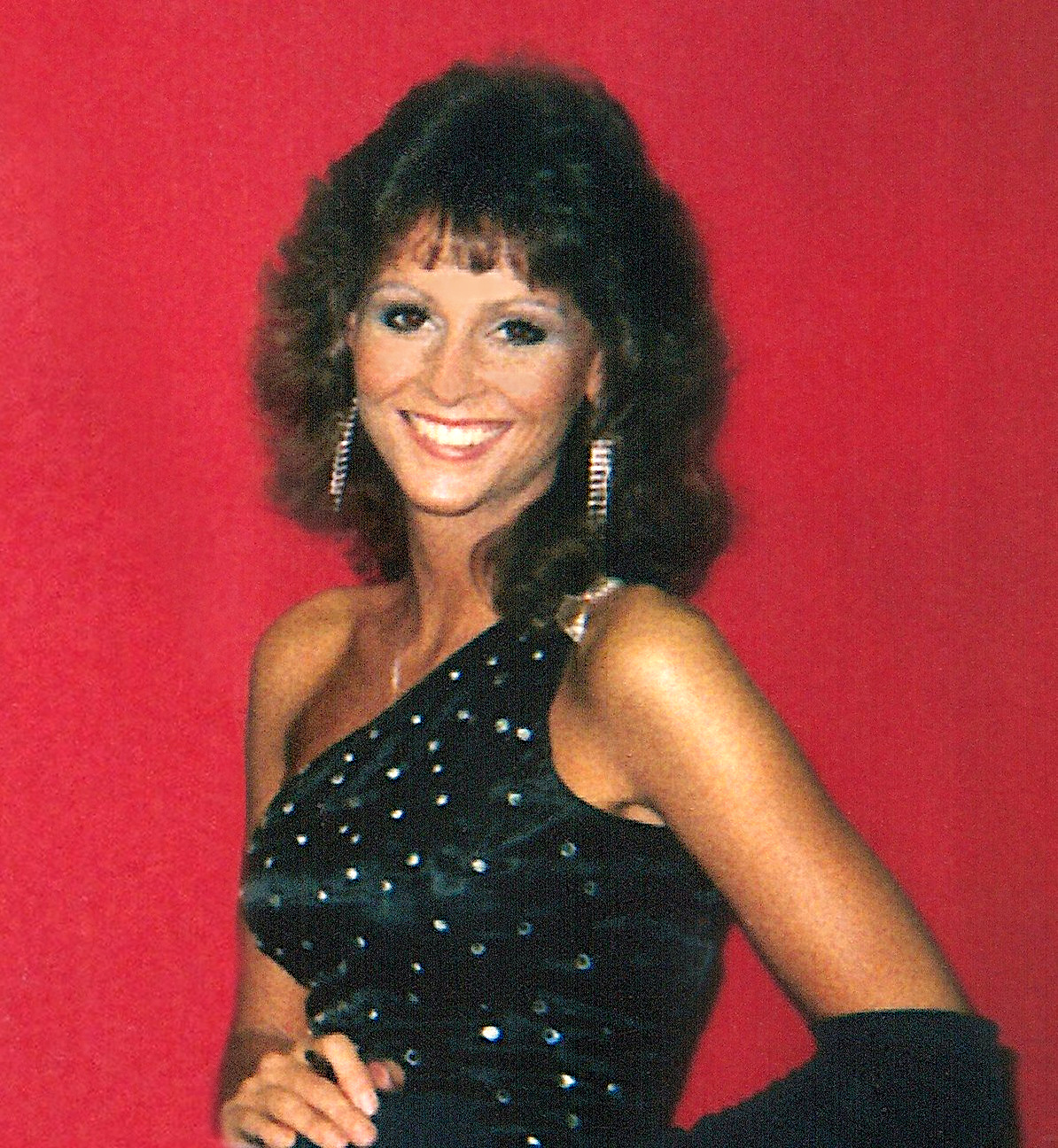
Miss Elizabeth, Savage's first wife

The storyline with Miss Elizabeth continued, culminating with Savage proposing to her in the ring leading to an on-air wedding on August 26 at SummerSlam dubbed The Match Made in Heaven. It was at this time that Savage was targeted by the now-villain Jake "The Snake" Roberts. On an episode of Prime Time Wrestling prior to SummerSlam, the announcers and several wrestlers threw a "bachelor party" for Savage, with Roberts' arrival deemed unwelcome by the rest of the contingent.

In the post-SummerSlam wedding reception, Roberts and his new ally, The Undertaker, made their presence known by hiding a live snake in one of the newly married couple's wedding presents; Elizabeth was frightened when she opened the gift box, and the Undertaker blindsided Savage by knocking him out with the urn while Roberts pulled the snake from the box and menaced Elizabeth with it. Sid Justice ran off both Roberts and The Undertaker. Savage, still unable to compete due to his WrestleMania VII loss to Ultimate Warrior, immediately began a public campaign to have himself reinstated as an active wrestler to gain revenge on Roberts; however, WWF President Jack Tunney refused. During a television taping for WWF Superstars of Wrestling on November 23, Roberts cut an in-ring promo to goad Savage into the ring. After he was lured into the ring, Roberts attacked Savage, eventually tying Savage into the ropes before getting a live king cobra to bite his arm. According to Hulk Hogan and Jake Roberts on the Pick Your Poison DVD, the snake was holding on with the fangs and Jake had a hard time getting the snake off Randy. With help from the fans, Savage was later reinstated by Tunney, who announced a match between Savage and Roberts for This Tuesday in Texas on December 3, where Savage defeated Roberts, however, Roberts performed the DDT on Savage three times after the match, and things came to a head when Roberts slapped Miss Elizabeth. The feud continued throughout the winter, ending after a match on the February 8, 1992, episode of Saturday Night's Main Event XXX, which Savage won.

Savage then began an on-screen feud with WWF Champion Ric Flair, who claimed that he had been in a prior relationship with Savage's wife Miss Elizabeth, going as far as presenting pictures of Elizabeth and Flair together. This culminated in a title match between the two on April 5 at WrestleMania VIII; Savage won the match and his second WWF Championship. During this time, Savage and Elizabeth separated in real life, however, the Savage-Flair feud continued, and WWF Magazine published photos of Savage and Elizabeth, which were identical to those featuring Elizabeth and Flair; it was revealed that Flair had doctored the Savage-Elizabeth pictures. The former couple were divorced on September 18, and a statement announcing the divorce appeared in WWF Magazine at about the same time, a rare break of kayfabe for the WWF at the time.

For the better part of 1992, Savage and his old nemesis Ultimate Warrior (who returned to the WWF at WrestleMania VIII) peacefully co-existed. However, when it was announced that Warrior was the new number-one contender for Savage's WWF Championship, old tensions resurfaced and they had several heated exchanges prior to the match. On August 29 (transmitted on pay-per-view TV August 31), Savage defended the title against Ultimate Warrior at SummerSlam. WWF writers had originally intended that Warrior should be the one to accept Mr. Perfect's services - up for offer to either Summerslam main event competitor - turning heel in the process of winning the title and continuing his feud with the dethroned Savage, now the babyface in their rivalry. However these plans were scrapped at a late stage due to the Warrior's refusal to turn heel after considering the collapse in merchandise sales which would have resulted. Instead, Savage lost the match by countout, after having his knee injured by Flair and Mr. Perfect, but retained the championship. After the match, Warrior helped a badly injured Savage to the back. On the September 14 episode of Prime Time Wrestling (taped September 1), Savage lost the WWF Championship to Flair after interference from Razor Ramon.

He then formed a tag team with Warrior known as the "Ultimate Maniacs", and after his title loss shortly after, an injured Savage backed Warrior to dethrone Flair. On the November 8, 1992, episode of Saturday Night's Main Event XXXI, they took on Money Inc. (Ted DiBiase and Irwin R. Schyster) for the WWF Tag Team Championship. Money Inc. lost by countout but retained their titles. Savage and Warrior were to face Flair and Ramon at Survivor Series on November 25. Warrior was fired from the WWF weeks before the event, so Savage chose Mr. Perfect, executive consultant to Flair, as his partner to replace Warrior. Perfect initially laughed off the suggestion, but was angered by Bobby Heenan and his insinuations that he could never again wrestle at his previous level, and accepted the match. The duo defeated Flair and Ramon via disqualification.

When Monday Night Raw began in January 1993, Savage served primarily as a color commentator. On January 24, he was the runner up in the Royal Rumble match at Royal Rumble, where he was eliminated by Yokozuna. Savage returned to pay-per-view on November 24 at Survivor Series as a substitute for Mr. Perfect. He also competed in the 1994 Royal Rumble match on January 22, but was eliminated by Crush, leading to a Falls Count Anywhere match on March 20 at WrestleMania X, where Savage defeated Crush. Savage also made periodic appearances in Jim Cornette's Smoky Mountain Wrestling promotion in May and made his final WWF pay-per-view appearance on August 29 at SummerSlam, where he served as the master of ceremonies. Savage's final WWF match was a tour in Germany when he teamed with Bret Hart to defeat Owen Hart and Jim Neidhart on September 13, 1994, in Rostock. At the end of October 1994, Savage's WWF contract expired and he left to sign with rival World Championship Wrestling (WCW).

=== World Championship Wrestling (1994–2000) ===
==== Mega Powers reunion (1994–1995) ====
Savage made his first appearance for WCW on the December 3, 1994, episode of WCW Saturday Night, referencing the love/hate relationship he had with Hulk Hogan and stated his desire to be the WCW World Heavyweight Champion. He appeared at Starrcade '94: Triple Threat on December 27, saving Hogan from an attack by the Three Faces of Fear, shaking hands with his friend and rival. At SuperBrawl V on February 19, 1995, Savage and Sting defeated Avalanche and Big Bubba Rogers. On March 19 at Uncensored, Savage defeated Avalanche via disqualification when a fan, who happened to be Ric Flair dressed in drag, attacked Savage. This led to a feud between Savage and Flair, where, on May 21, Flair attacked Savage's father, Angelo Poffo, at Slamboree following the main event where Savage and Hogan defeated Flair and Vader.

Savage participated in the WCW United States Heavyweight Championship tournament, defeating The Butcher in the first round and "Stunning" Steve Austin in the quarterfinals. He then interfered in Flair's match against Alex Wright, attacking Flair and causing Wright to get disqualified, which set up a tournament semi-final in which the winner would face the winner of the Sting and Meng match for the title at The Great American Bash. Savage and Flair's tournament semi-final match never took place, however, due to Savage and Flair brawling in the backstage area prior to the match and both being eliminated from the tournament. At the event on June 18, Savage lost to Flair after Flair stole Angelo's cane and hit Savage with it. In a rematch on July 16, Savage defeated Flair in a lifeguard lumberjack match at Bash at the Beach. Later that year, during part of the storyline in which Arn Anderson and Ric Flair turned on each other, Flair (looking for a partner to take on Anderson and Brian Pillman in a tag match) tried to recruit Savage to be his partner. Remembering the rivalry (and how Flair had attacked Savage's father), Savage refused. At Fall Brawl on September 17, Savage, Hogan, Lex Luger and Sting defeated The Dungeon of Doom (Kamala, The Zodiac, The Shark and Meng) in a WarGames match. On October 29 at Halloween Havoc, Savage defeated Luger.

==== WCW World Heavyweight Champion (1995–1996) ====
At World War 3 on November 26, Savage won his first WCW World Heavyweight Championship by winning the first-ever 60-man three-ring battle royal. On December 27, he lost the title to Flair at Starrcade '95: World Cup of Wrestling; earlier that night, he defeated Hiroyoshi Tenzan. Savage won his second WCW World Heavyweight Championship back from Flair on the January 22, 1996, episode of Nitro. During this time, Savage brought Elizabeth with him into WCW as his manager once again. At SuperBrawl VI on February 11, Savage defended the title against Flair in steel cage match, however, he lost the title after Elizabeth turned on Savage when she allowed Flair to hit him with one of her high heel shoes. Flair claimed that Elizabeth gave him a sizable amount of Savage's money, taken in their divorce settlement, which he used to set up a "VIP section" at Nitro events.

At Uncensored on March 24, Savage and Hogan won a Doomsday Cage match against Flair, Arn Anderson, Meng, The Barbarian, Luger, The Taskmaster, Z-Gangsta and The Ultimate Solution. On May 19 at Slamboree, Savage and Flair were paired in the Lord of the Ring tournament, where they defeated Anderson and Eddie Guerrero, but lost to Public Enemy (Johnny Grunge and Rocco Rock) by forfeit after Savage attacked Flair during his entrance as a retribution for Flair's attack on Savage in their earlier match. At Bash at the Beach on July 7, the New World Order (nWo) was formed when Hulk Hogan turned on Savage, Sting, and Lex Luger and joined "The Outsiders", a tag team of former WWF wrestlers Kevin Nash and Scott Hall. After their inception, one of their main enemies became Savage himself, who was one of the leaders of the WCW crusaders against the nWo. Savage threatened Hogan for months, often being attacked by the nWo. On September 15 at Fall Brawl '96: War Games, Savage was defeated by The Giant. At Halloween Havoc on October 27, Savage finally faced Hogan for the WCW World Heavyweight Championship, but lost when The Giant interfered and hit him with a chokeslam. Savage left WCW following the event, as he was unable to reach a new deal with the company.

==== New World Order (1997–1998) ====
Savage returned to WCW on the January 20, 1997, episode of Nitro hijacking the show, claiming to have been "blackballed" and refusing to leave the ring until Sting showed up, and the two left together. Savage appeared again with Sting over the next couple Nitro shows roving and watching events from the crowd as "free agents". At one point, WCW president and nWo member Eric Bischoff informed Savage that his WCW career was over and he could only return as an nWo member. On February 23, Sting and Savage appeared at SuperBrawl VII, where Savage left Sting's side and joined the nWo by helping Hogan defeat Roddy Piper. The next night, he reunited with Elizabeth, who had joined the nWo several months earlier during Savage's hiatus from WCW. Savage began feuding with Diamond Dallas Page and his wife Kimberly. On March 16 at Uncensored, Savage won a Triangle Elimination match with the nWo. He lost to Page in a no disqualification match on April 6 at Spring Stampede, but defeated him in a falls count anywhere match on June 15 at The Great American Bash, as well as in a tag team match at Bash at the Beach on July 13. At Road Wild on August 9, Savage lost to the Giant, and on September 14 at Fall Brawl, Savage and Scott Hall lost to Page and Luger. Their feud ended in a Las Vegas Death match on October 26 at Halloween Havoc, which Savage won.

On January 24, 1998, at Souled Out, Savage lost to Luger. Luger also won a rematch between the two on February 22 at SuperBrawl VIII. Savage faced Hogan in a steel cage match at Uncensored on March 15, which ended in a no contest. When Hogan failed to recapture his "nWo" title from Sting, it was Savage's turn, and he got his shot on April 19 at Spring Stampede. Hogan tried to make sure that Savage would not win the title because Hogan felt that he was the only nWo member who should be WCW World Heavyweight Champion, since he was the leader of the stable. With the help of Nash, however, Savage beat Sting for his third WCW World Heavyweight Championship, despite tearing his ACL in his knee during the match. The following night on Nitro, Hogan faced Savage for the championship, and it looked like Hogan had Savage beat, but for the second consecutive night, Nash came to Savage's aid, powerbombing Hogan. However, an interfering Bret Hart attacked Savage and preserved the victory for Hogan. Savage then joined with Nash and others to form the nWo Wolfpac, a split from Hogan's group.

At Slamboree on May 17, Savage lost to Hart by submission. On June 14 at The Great American Bash, Savage teamed up with Piper against and lost to Hogan and Hart by submission. After the match, Savage wrestled Piper in the next match, which Savage quickly lost to Piper by submission. After the next night on Nitro, Savage took a hiatus from the company to recover from at least two major knee surgeries. He made only one more appearance in 1998, helping Ric Flair defeat Eric Bischoff for the Presidency of WCW on the December 28 episode of Nitro. As nWo member the Giant was interfering on Bischoff's behalf, Savage entered the ring wearing an nWo shirt but duped, low-blowed and clotheslined the Giant out of the ring and removed the shirt while exiting.

==== Team Madness (1999–2000) ====
Savage returned in April 1999, debuting a new look and theme music, sporting a slicked-back ponytail, earrings, and a new villainous attitude (though still embracing the fans), as well as introducing his new valet, Gorgeous George. His first action was as the guest referee in the main event at Spring Stampede on April 11, which was won by Diamond Dallas Page. For a short time afterward, Savage interfered in DDP's matches to make sure that Page kept the WCW World Heavyweight Championship, but when Kevin Nash won it on May 9 at Slamboree, Savage went after the title himself. It was around that time that Madusa and Miss Madness joined Savage as his other two valets; together they were known as Team Madness. On June 13 at The Great American Bash, Sid Vicious returned to WCW and helped Savage to attack Kevin Nash.

This led to a tag team match on July 11 at Bash at the Beach between Nash and Sting against Savage and Sid Vicious, in which whoever scored the winning fall would win the WCW World Heavyweight Championship; Savage won his fourth and final WCW World Heavyweight Championship when he pinned Nash. Savage's last reign as champion did not last long, as he lost the title to a returning Hollywood Hogan the next night on Nitro, when Nash interfered and hit a powerbomb on Savage (in a reversal of the situation from the previous year, in which Nash had attacked Hogan to help Savage keep his title, albeit unsuccessfully). Team Madness slowly started to disband, after Madusa and Miss Madness began fighting each other over who was responsible for Savage's title loss. Savage soon fired both of them and started a feud with Dennis Rodman, defeating him at Road Wild on August 14.

Savage disappeared from WCW programming following his feud with Rodman and would make two more appearances: first on the October 25, 1999, episode of Nitro, when he appeared in the ring with Gorgeous George and talked about passing the torch forward. His second, and final, WCW appearance would be on the May 3, 2000, episode of Thunder, when Savage returned to join The Millionaire's Club – a group consisting of Hulk Hogan, Ric Flair, and other veterans – aiding them at the end of a 41-man battle royal. Despite Savage ending the show claiming he was going to help the veteran group take out the young New Blood group, he did not appear again in WCW before they folded the next year.

=== Total Nonstop Action Wrestling (2004) ===
On November 7, 2004, Savage returned to professional wrestling at Total Nonstop Action Wrestling's (TNA) Victory Road pay-per-view, confronting Jeff Jarrett. He made his Impact! debut on November 19, confronting the Kings of Wrestling (Jarrett, Kevin Nash, and Scott Hall). At the end of the next week's show, he led a group attack on them. On December 5, at Turning Point, Savage, Jeff Hardy and A.J. Styles defeated them in his last match. Savage never signed a contract with TNA, instead working on a per date handshake deal.

== Other media ==
=== Endorsements ===
He was the celebrity spokesman for Slim Jim snack foods in the early-to-late 1990s. His catch phrase in the ads was "Snap into a Slim Jim, oooooh yeah!", which became a recurring theme for Slim Jim ads. In 1998, Savage accepted an award from Harvard University's humor society Harvard Lampoon as Man of the Year.

=== Acting career ===
Savage appeared in many television shows in the mid-to-late '90s. He appeared on a wrestling-themed episode of Baywatch that aired in 1996 with fellow WCW wrestlers Hulk Hogan, Ric Flair, Big Van Vader, and Kevin Sullivan. In 1999, he appeared on popular television shows Walker, Texas Ranger and Mad About You.

Savage appeared in his first theatrical film in 2000 making an appearance as his Macho Man character in the movie Ready to Rumble where David Arquette daydreams a sequence fighting Savage at a gas station. Savage's most famous film role was in the 2002 film Spider-Man as the wrestler Bonesaw McGraw (based on the comics character Crusher Hogan). During filming of the wrestling scene in Spider-Man, Savage insisted to perform his own stunt, when Bonesaw lands on his head after being monkey flipped by Peter Parker, which resulted in a life changing neck injury.

Savage's memorable voice gave him voice acting roles for various television and film projects. He voiced the rogue alien wrestler "Rasslor" in the Dexter's Laboratory shorts Dial M for Monkey. He also provided his voice in many other shows including the voice for "Gorilla" in an episode of King of the Hill and the voice of Space Ghost's grandfather in an episode of Space Ghost Coast to Coast. Savage served as the voice of "The Thug" in Disney's Academy Award-nominated 2008 animated film Bolt, which was his last theatrical film appearance. Savage reprised the role in Super Rhino in 2009 for the short film featuring the cast of Bolt.

=== Filmography ===
Film
Year	Title	Role	Notes
2000	Ready to Rumble	Himself	
2002	Spider-Man	Bonesaw McGraw	
2008	Glago's Guest		Short, Voice
2008	Bolt	Thug	Voice
2009	Super Rhino	Thug	Voice
Television
Year	Title	Role	Notes
1996	Baywatch	Himself	Episode: "Bash at the Beach"
1996	Phillips Top 10	Himself	Episode: ""
1996	Dexter's Laboratory	Rasslor	Episode: "Dial M for Monkey": Rasslor, Voice
1997	Space Ghost Coast to Coast	Leonard "the Gray Ghost" Ghostal	A former professional wrestler (and Space Ghost's grandfather), Voice, Episode: "Piledriver"
1997	The Jeff Foxworthy Show	Himself	Episode: "Wrestling Opera"
1997	The Weird Al Show	Himself	Episode: "Al Gets Robbed"
1999	Walker, Texas Ranger	Whitelaw Lundren	Episode: "Fight or Die"
1999	Mad About You	Himself	Episode: "Separated Beds"
1999	Arliss	Himself	Episode: "To Thine Own Self Be True"
2001	Nikki	James "Pretty Boy" Carter	Pro-wrestler, Episode: "Fallback"
2003	College University	Himself	Episode: "You've Pushpa'd Me Too Far"
2003	Duck Dodgers	Master Sergeant Emily Dickinson Jones	Voice, Episode: "Queen Is Wild, The/Back to the Academy"
2003	Whatever Happened to Robot Jones	Biker	Voice, Episode: "Family Vacation"
2005	The X's	Sasquatch	Voice, 3 episodes
2007	King of the Hill	Gorilla	Voice, Episode: "Bill, Bulk and the Body Buddies"
Video Games
Year	Title	Role	Notes
2009	Cars Race-O-Rama	El Machismo	Voice

=== Music ===
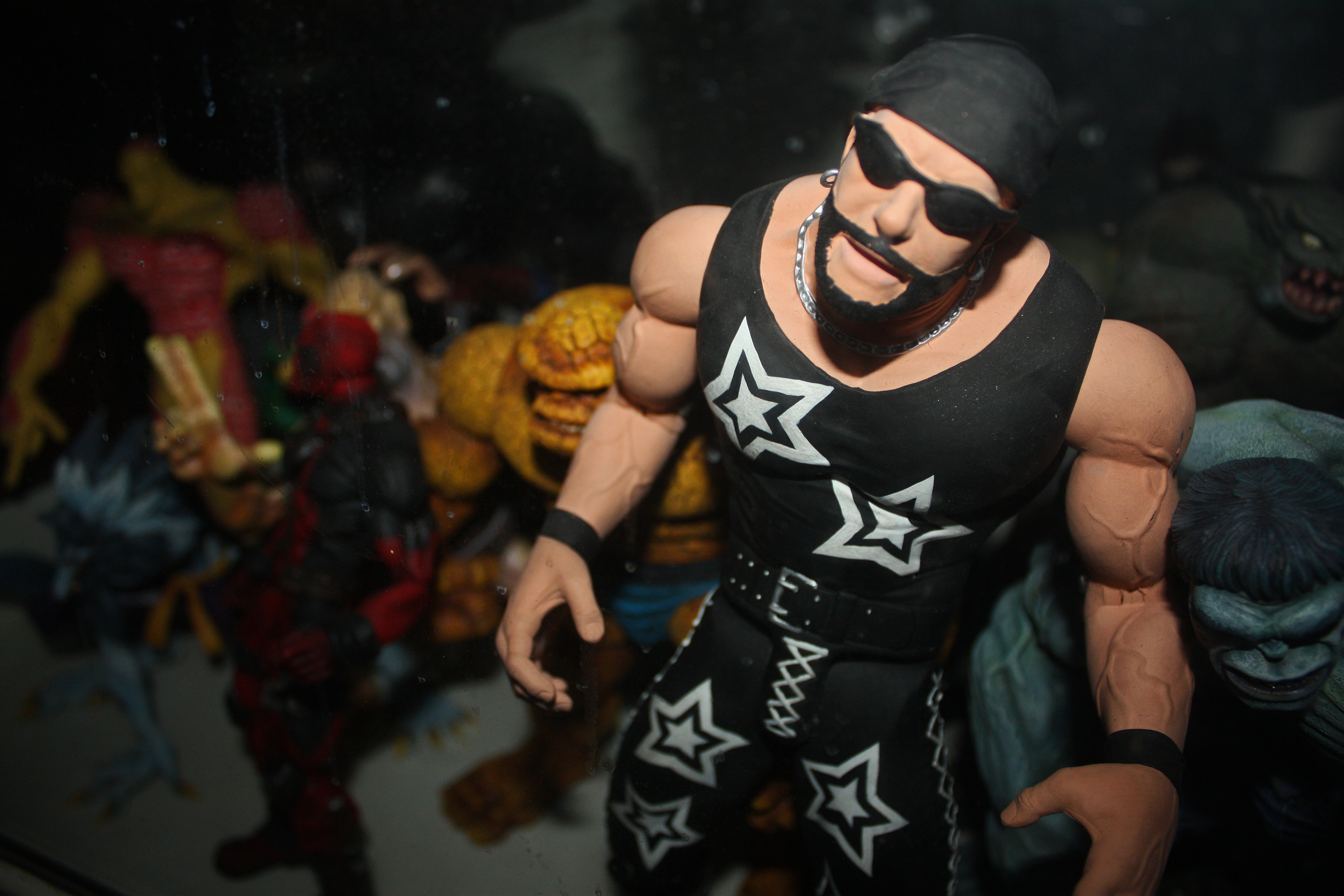
Randy Savage figure

Savage's music debut was on the WWF-produced WrestleMania: The Album in 1993, where he sang on the song "Speaking from the Heart", one of many songs sung by then-WWF wrestlers on the CD.

On October 7, 2003, Savage released his debut rap album titled Be a Man. It includes a tribute song to "Mr. Perfect" Curt Hennig, as well as a diss track aimed at Hulk Hogan. Savage promoted Be a Man with a concert tour featuring Brian Adams as his bodyguard and Ron Harris as touring manager. During this time, the development of a second album was already in progress with Savage exclaiming, "We are absolutely going to have more records." However, no further albums were released.

Just three months before his death on February 2, 2011, EpicLLOYD and Nice Peter made a song along with a video for Epic Rap Battles of History of Hulk Hogan, "Macho Man" Randy Savage and Kim Jong-Il having a rap battle. They noted his death with annotations in the video.

Rapper Don Trip released a mixtape on January 24, 2014, entitled Randy Savage. All tracks have Savage's famous "Ohhh Yeah!!!" in the opening of the song; the track entitled "Cream of the Crop" has Savage's "Nothing Means Nothing" speech from an interview after WrestleMania III. In January 2015, DJ/rapper DJ Cummerbund began releasing a series of remixes that feature samples from Be a Man which has received critical acclaim.

=== Video games ===
Savage appeared in WWF WrestleMania, WWF WrestleMania Challenge, WWF Superstars, WWF WrestleMania: Steel Cage Challenge, WWF Super WrestleMania, WWF Royal Rumble, WWF King of the Ring, WCW vs nWo: World Tour, WCW Nitro, WCW/nWo Revenge, WCW/nWo Thunder, WCW Mayhem, Fire Pro Wrestling, Showdown: Legends of Wrestling, WWE All Stars, as a DLC in WWE 12 and as an unlockable character in WWE 2K14. He appears as the Macho King as a DLC in WWE 2K15, in WWE 2K16 as a starting wrestler, in WWE 2K17, WWE 2K18 as an unlockable wrestler through the in-game currency "VC" (Virtual Currency), and WWE 2K19 as an exclusive DLC character for the Collector's edition of the game, entitled the "Wooooo!" Edition, WWE 2K20 as an unlockable character through the game's currency, WWE 2K Battlegrounds as a post-launch DLC character, and is also an unlockable character in WWE 2K22, WWE 2K23, WWE 2K24, WWE 2K25, and WWE 2K26. He also appears in Brawlhalla as a crossover.

Savage's 16-plus-year absence from WWE-licensed games from 1994's WWF Raw to 2011's WWE All Stars was recognized by Guinness World Records in its 2015 gamer's edition as the longest such absence.

== Personal life ==
Savage met Elizabeth Hulette, better known as Miss Elizabeth, at a gym in Lexington in 1982, and they married in 1984. They divorced in 1992. On May 10, 2010, Savage married Barbara Lynn Payne, whom he had previously dated in the early 1970s.

For years, Savage and Hulk Hogan were at odds and had an on again/off again friendship. He had a dog named Hercules, a German Shepherd that was given to him by Hercules Hernandez. Savage also had a cat whom he had rescued 6 months prior to his death in 2011 which he had named "JYC" or "Junkyard Cat" after his close friend "Junkyard Dog". [175]

== Death ==
On the morning of May 20, 2011, Savage was driving his Jeep Wrangler near his home in Seminole, Florida, with his wife Lynn Payne in the passenger seat when he became unresponsive and crashed into a tree. Paramedics arrived soon after and found him dead at the scene. He was 58 years old. Savage and Payne had been wearing seatbelts, and Payne suffered only minor physical injuries in the crash. An autopsy performed by the medical examiner's office found that he had an enlarged heart and advanced coronary artery disease (more than 90% narrowed) which had resulted in a sudden heart attack. The drugs found in his system included a prescription painkiller and a small amount of alcohol. Savage had never been treated for heart problems and there was no evidence that he was aware of his heart condition. The cause of death was officially ruled as atherosclerotic heart disease.

Five days after his death, Savage was cremated, and his ashes were placed under a favorite tree on his property in Largo, Florida, near his mother's development. Ten days before his death, he had asked his brother to pour the ashes of his dog in the same spot. When Savage's brother asked why, Savage stated that it was because he wanted him to remember that spot, since he wanted his ashes to be poured there as well.

== Legacy ==
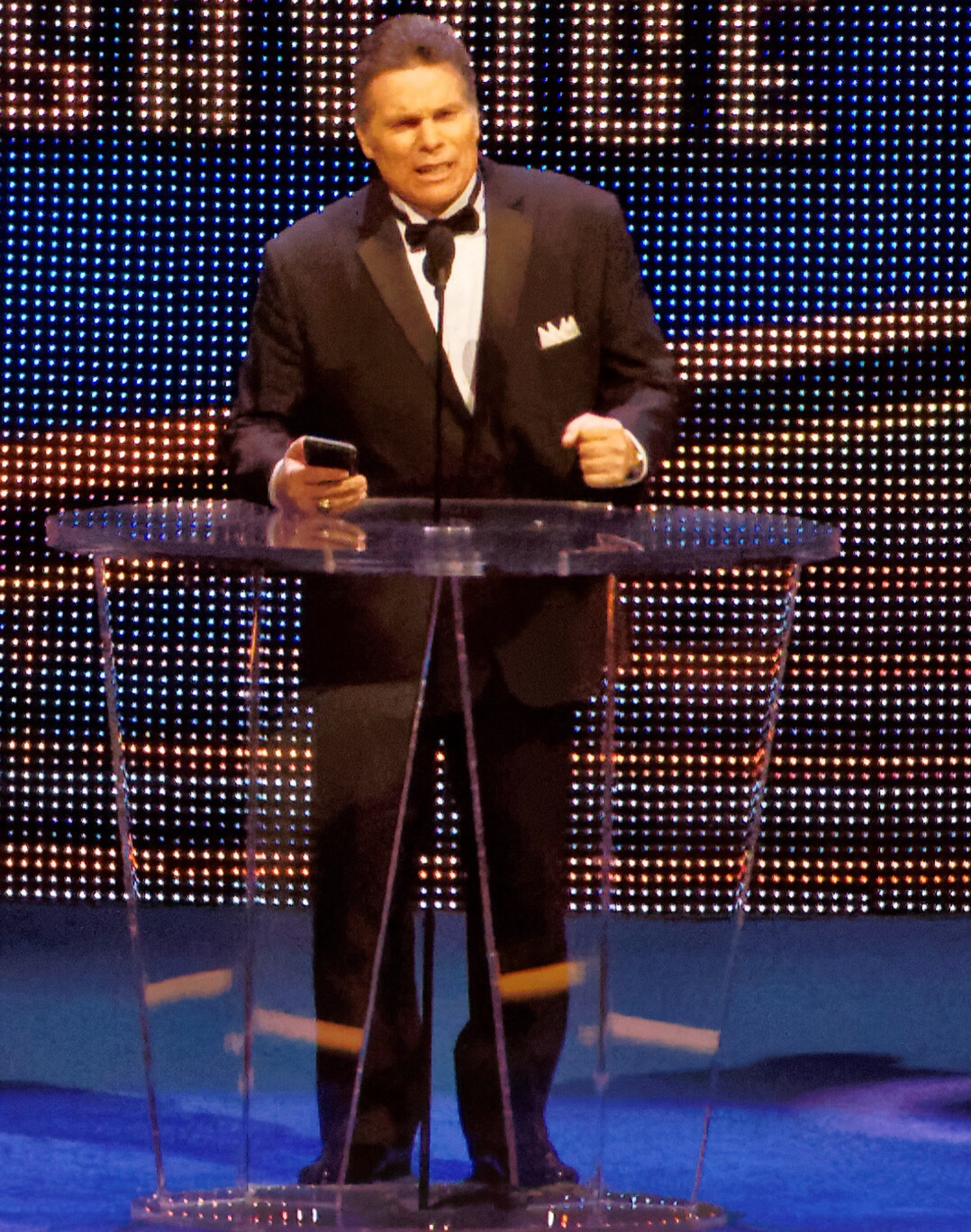
Savage was represented by his brother, Lanny Poffo, at his WWE Hall of Fame induction.

Vince McMahon, with whom Savage had a longtime strained relationship, paid tribute to Savage in a Time magazine article, describing Savage as "one of wrestling's all-time greats". TNA held a ten-bell salute in Savage's honor the night of his death. WWE aired a tribute video on the May 23 episode of Raw with the song "The Scientist" by Coldplay. Later that night, CM Punk paid tribute to Savage by wearing pink trunks and yellow boots, complete with white stars on the trunks, during a tag team match with R-Truth against John Cena and Rey Mysterio. Punk later adapted a version of the diving elbow drop into his moveset.

In August 2011, Kevin Eck of The Baltimore Sun lauded Savage as an all-round performer, saying that "nobody blended power, speed, agility, and technical skills like the 'Macho Man' in his prime".

WWE released a DVD documentary, Macho Man: The Randy Savage Story, in November 2014. Despite a strained relationship over the years with the WWE, the documentary featured interviews with Savage's mother and his brother Lanny Poffo, with Poffo giving insight to many of the rumors and denying some of the negative things other wrestlers said in the documentary about Savage, including his relationship with Elizabeth. Savage was never inducted into the WWE Hall of Fame during his lifetime and he was frequently described as being one of its most noticeably absent figures.

On January 12, 2015, WWE announced Savage as the first inductee to the WWE Hall of Fame class of 2015, and that his Mega Powers partner and long-time rival Hulk Hogan would induct him. Lanny Poffo, Savage's brother, accepted the honor on Randy's behalf by reading a poem. Later on the WWE Network that same night Lanny commented, "I had no thoughts. I was so excited. Intellectually, there was nothing. It was all emotional. I was happy for the fans. They waited for Bruno Sammartino for so many years and now they waited for Macho Man." He went on to say that Savage's mother and his 30-year-old daughter are both very excited and said of the WWE Network, "Randy will never die." Vince McMahon reached out to Savage back in 2010, wanting to induct only him in the Hall of Fame, but Savage refused to go in without his father and his brother.

On September 1, 2018, at the event All In, Jay Lethal was accompanied to the ring by Lanny Poffo, while dressed in one of Savage's original outfits.

Savage is a subject of "The Match Made in Heaven", the first episode of Viceland's Dark Side of the Ring, that premiered on April 10, 2019.

On July 28, 2023, the Dutchess County, New York, Legislature declared July 6 as "Macho Man" Randy Savage Day in honor of his WWF debut on television at the Mid-Hudson Civic Center on July 6, 1985.

On September 26, 2023, the train overpass on Linden Avenue in the city of Zanesville, Ohio, was renamed in honor of the late Randy Savage. The overpass sits directly to the north of the Y-Bridge.

== Championships and accomplishments ==
Savage was a two-time WWF World Heavyweight Champion

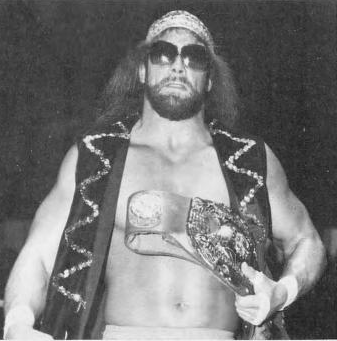
Savage was a one-time WWC North American Heavyweight Champion.

- NWA Mid-America / Continental Wrestling Association
  - AWA Southern Heavyweight Championship (2 times)
  - CWA International Heavyweight Championship (1 time)
  - NWA Mid-America Heavyweight Championship (3 times)
- Grand Prix Wrestling
  - GPW International Heavyweight Championship (2 times)
- Gulf Coast Championship Wrestling
  - NWA Gulf Coast Tag Team Championship (1 time) – with Lanny Poffo
- International Championship Wrestling
  - ICW World Heavyweight Championship (3 times)
- Ilio DiPaolo Legends of the Aud
  - Hall of Fame (2016)
- Memphis Wrestling Hall of Fame
  - Class of 2022
- Pro Wrestling Illustrated
  - Comeback of the Year (1995)
  - Feud of the Year (1997) vs. Diamond Dallas Page
  - Match of the Year (1987) vs. Ricky Steamboat at WrestleMania III
  - Most Hated Wrestler of the Year (1989)
  - Most Popular Wrestler of the Year (1988)
  - Stanley Weston Award (2011)
  - Wrestler of the Year (1988)
  - Ranked No. 2 of the top 500 singles wrestlers in the PWI 500 in 1992
  - Ranked No. 9 of the top 500 singles wrestlers of the "PWI Years" in 2003
  - Ranked No. 57 of the top 100 tag teams of the "PWI Years" with Hulk Hogan in 2003
- Professional Wrestling Hall of Fame
  - Class of 2009
- Sports Illustrated
  - Ranked No. 11 of the 20 Greatest WWE Wrestlers Of All Time
- United States Wrestling Association
  - USWA Unified World Heavyweight Championship (1 time)
- World Championship Wrestling
  - WCW World Heavyweight Championship (4 times)
  - WCW World War 3 (1995)
  - World Cup of Wrestling (1995) - with Sting, Lex Luger, Johnny B. Badd, Eddie Guerrero, Chris Benoit, and Alex Wright
- World Wrestling Council
  - WWC North American Heavyweight Championship (1 time)
- World Wrestling Federation / WWE
  - WWF World Heavyweight Championship (2 times)
  - WWF Intercontinental Heavyweight Championship (1 time)
  - King of the Ring (1987)
  - Undisputed WWF Heavyweight Championship Tournament (1988)
  - WWE Hall of Fame (Class of 2015)
- Wrestling Observer Newsletter
  - Match of the Year (1987) vs. Ricky Steamboat at WrestleMania III
  - Most Unimproved (1992)
  - Worst Worked Match of the Year (1996) with Hulk Hogan vs. Arn Anderson, Meng, The Barbarian, Ric Flair, Kevin Sullivan, Z-Gangsta, and The Ultimate Solution in a Towers of Doom match at Uncensored
  - Wrestling Observer Newsletter Hall of Fame (Class of 1996)

== See also ==
- List of Italian-American entertainers
- List of multi-sport athletes
- "The Match Made in Heaven"
