= Stephanie Bellars =

American professional wrestling valet (born 1976)

Personal information
- Born: January 25, 1976 (age 50) Rockford, Illinois, US
- Spouse: Doyle Wolfgang von Frankenstein (m. 2001; div. 2013)
- Children: 2

Professional wrestling career
- Ring name(s): George; George Frankenstein; Gorgeous George; Minsa
- Billed height: 5 ft 2 in (1.57 m)
- Billed weight: 118 lb (54 kg)
- Trained by: Debrah Miceli; Molly Holly; WCW Power Plant
- Debut: April 1999
- Retired: 2014

Stephanie Bellars (born January 25, 1976) is an American former professional wrestling valet. She is mostly known for her tenure in World Championship Wrestling (WCW) as Gorgeous George, the kayfabe manager of "Macho Man" Randy Savage. After WCW, she worked for Extreme Championship Wrestling (ECW) and other promotions under various ring names.

== Professional wrestling ==
Bellars met wrestling legend Macho Man Randy Savage while she was dancing at Thee Dollhouse in Tampa. Her first time on WCW programming was in a brief unnamed role when she accompanied Savage for Savage's surprise appearance during the main event match between Eric Bischoff and Ric Flair on the December 28, 1998 episode of Monday Nitro. Bellars officially debuted under the name "Gorgeous George" at Spring Stampede (1999) alongside Savage as her manager. The following month, she competed in her first match at Slamboree (1999), defeating referee Charles Robinson in a match with Savage's job on the line. Bellars was a member of the short-lived Team Madness stable, which saw Savage win his fourth and final WCW World Heavyweight Championship title at Bash at the Beach (1999). Bellars' final appearance in WCW was in October of that year.

Bellars appeared on Extreme Championship Wrestling for a few months starting in July 2000. She made several appearances at various wrestling events in 2003 and 2004 including NWA-TNA, Women's Extreme Wrestling, 3PW, and NCW. At a 3PW event in 2003, Bellars wrestled Jasmin St. Claire in a match that ended up with the two women kissing in the ring.

After years away from the wrestling business, Bellars began appearing with Women Superstars Uncensored (WSU) in October 2008. While she mostly worked as a manager, she also competed in a tag team tournament and a battle royal. In 2011, she made a one-time appearance for National Wrestling Superstars. Between 2012 and 2014, she made appearances with River City Wrestling.
