= Mayhem =

Mayhem most commonly refers to:

- Mayhem (crime), a type of crime

Mayhem may also refer to:

== People ==
- Monica Mayhem (born 1978), Australian pornographic actress
- Jason "Mayhem" Miller, American mixed martial arts fighter
- Mayhem Miller (drag queen), American drag queen
- Mandy Mayhem, local government politician and performer in New Zealand
- Madame Mayhem, American singer-songwriter

== Art, entertainment, and media ==
=== Fiction ===
- Mayhem (advertising character), portrayed in an Allstate Insurance campaign by Dean Winters
- Mayhem (comics), a Marvel Comics character
- Mayhem! (comics), an Image Comics miniseries

=== Games ===
- Mayhem (video game), a 2011 3D demolition derby video game
- Ani-Mayhem, an anime-based collectible card game
- WCW Mayhem (video game), a 1999 game based on the event
- Worms 4: Mayhem, a 2005 3D artillery video game

=== Music ===
- Mayhem Festival, an American hard rock/metal festival
- Mayhem (band), a Norwegian black metal band
- Mayhem (rapper), an English grime MC
- Mayhem (Toyah album)
- Mayhem (Imelda May album)
  - "Mayhem" (Imelda May song), the title track
- Mayhem (Lady Gaga album), 2025
  - Mayhem promotional concerts, a 2025 promotional tour for the album
  - The Mayhem Ball, a 2025–2026 concert tour for the album
- "Mayhem" (Halestorm song), 2015
- "Mayhem" (Steve Aoki and Quintino song), 2018
- Mayhem, an alias used by electronic musician Emma Essex

=== Film and television ===
- TV Mayhem, a 1991 television show
- "Mayhem" (Criminal Minds), an episode of Criminal Minds
- "Mayhem" (Law & Order), an episode of Law & Order
- Mayhem (film), an American action-horror film directed by Joe Lynch
- Mayhem! (film), a French action film directed by Xavier Gens

== Sports ==
- Michigan Mayhem, an American minor league basketball team
- Minneapolis Mayhem, an American rugby union team
- Tampa Mayhem, an American rugby league team
- West Michigan Mayhem, a women's professional American football team
- Florida Mayhem, an American esports team in the Overwatch League

== Professional wrestling ==
- WCW Mayhem, a World Championship Wrestling event
  - Mayhem (1999)
  - Mayhem (2000)

== See also ==
- "Mayham", a 2006 episode of the TV series The Sopranos
