= Total Mayhem =

Total Mayhem may refer to:

- Total Mayhem (video game), a 1996 computer game
- Ultimate Spider-Man: Total Mayhem, a 2010 action game for iOS and Android
- The Joker (S&S Worldwide), originally Total Mayhem, a roller coaster at Six Flags Great Adventure in New Jersey, US

== See also ==
- Mayhem (disambiguation)
