= Sid Eudy =

American professional wrestler (1960–2024)

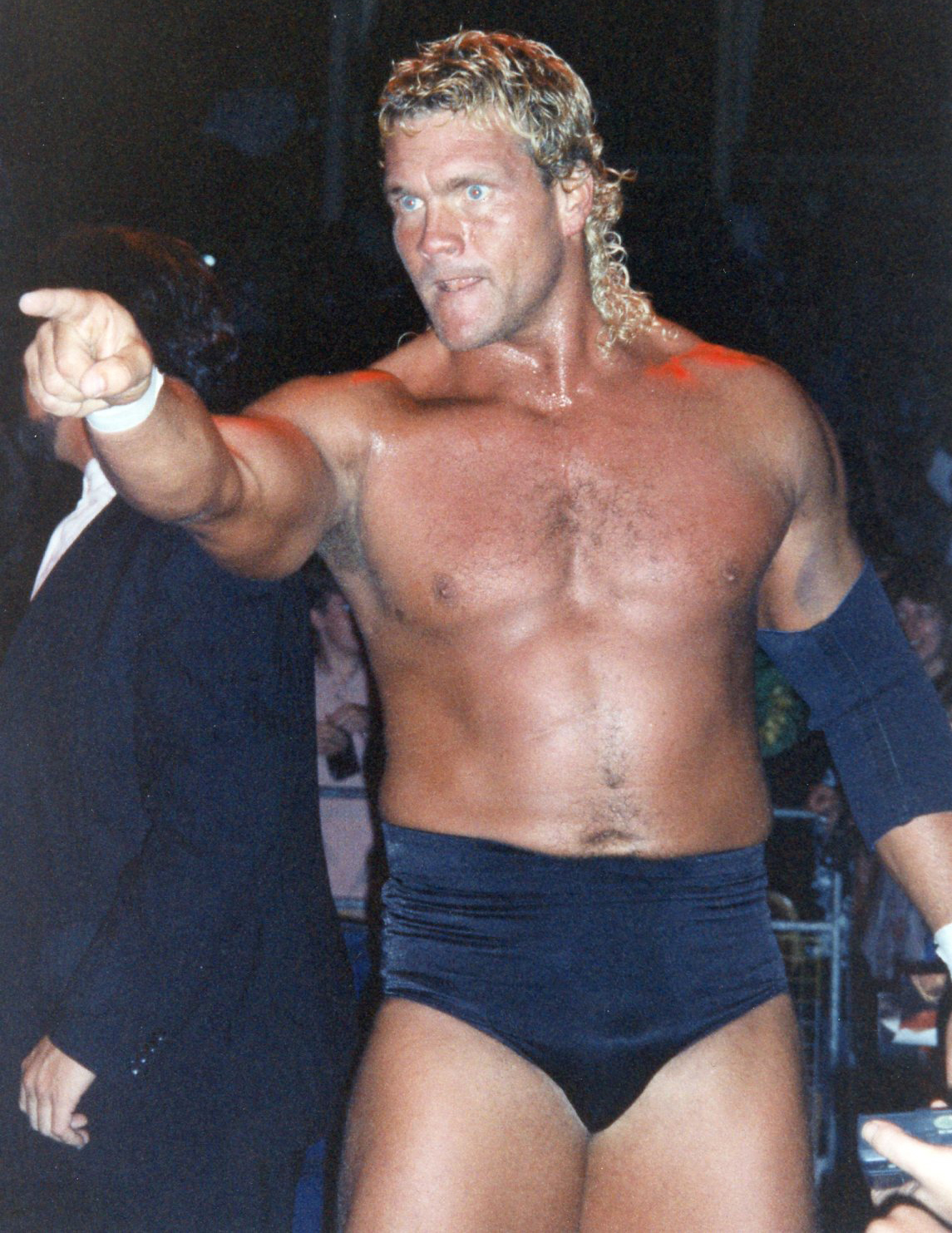
- Sid in 1995

Personal information
- Born: Sidney Raymond Eudy; December 16, 1960 Moses Lake, Washington, U.S.
- Died: August 26, 2024 (aged 63) Marion, Arkansas, U.S.
- Spouse: Sabrina Paige (m. 1983)
- Children: 2

Professional wrestling career
- Ring names: Lord Humongous; Sid; Sid Cyclope; Sid Eudy; Sid Justice; Sid Steele; Sid Vicious; Sycho Sid; Vicious Warrior
- Billed height: 6 ft 9 in (206 cm)
- Billed weight: 317 lb (144 kg)
- Billed from: West Memphis, Arkansas "Wherever he damn well pleases!"
- Trained by: Tojo Yamamoto
- Debut: 1987
- Retired: August 5, 2017

Sidney Raymond Eudy (December 16, 1960 – August 26, 2024) was an American professional wrestler, best known for his tenures in World Championship Wrestling (WCW) and the World Wrestling Federation (WWF) under the ring names Sid Justice, Sid Vicious, and Sycho Sid. He was a two-time WWF Champion and two-time WCW World Heavyweight Champion.

Eudy wrestled in a number of promotions, most notably the Continental Wrestling Association (CWA) and New Japan Pro-Wrestling (NJPW), en route to being signed by WCW in 1989 under the name "Sid Vicious". There, Sid was part of The Skyscrapers tag team with Dan Spivey, then part of The Four Horsemen in 1990 to 1991 with Ric Flair, Arn Anderson, and Barry Windham. In the summer of 1991, Eudy jumped to the WWF and adopted the ring name "Sid Justice", going on to main event WrestleMania VIII against Hulk Hogan in April 1992. Eudy abruptly quit the promotion later that spring following disagreements with management, and he returned to WCW at Slamboree '93: A Legends' Reunion in May 1993. Five months later, Eudy was involved in an infamous real-life altercation with Arn Anderson, which led to his immediate termination from WCW. This was just months prior to Sid's planned winning of the WCW World Heavyweight Championship at Starrcade '93: 10th Anniversary that December.

After a run in the United States Wrestling Association (USWA), where he won the USWA Unified World Heavyweight Championship twice, Eudy returned to the WWF in 1995 as "Sycho Sid", first as a bodyguard for Shawn Michaels, and then as part of Ted DiBiase's Million Dollar Corporation stable. He won the WWF Championship in 1996 by beating Michaels, where notably he was wildly cheered on by the crowd despite being a heel character. He won it again, this time from Bret Hart, in 1997, after which he headlined the WrestleMania 13 pay-per-view against challenger The Undertaker. Following an injury, Eudy left the WWF and spent some time on the independent circuit and in Extreme Championship Wrestling (ECW).

Eudy (as "Sid Vicious") returned to WCW in 1999 where he feuded with Kevin Nash and Scott Steiner before winning the WCW United States Heavyweight Championship. He headlined Starrcade in December 2000 and defeated Nash on two occasions to win the WCW World Heavyweight Championship. During the main event of the 2001 pay-per-view Sin, Eudy jumped off the ropes and suffered a double compound fracture in his left leg, which forced him to largely retire from professional wrestling. He returned to the WWE in 2012 in two appearances as Sycho Sid as part of WWE Raw 1000. Eudy died of cancer in 2024. He was posthumously inducted into the WWE Hall of Fame in 2026.

== Early life ==
Sidney Eudy was born on December 16, 1960, in Moses Lake, Washington to his parents Joe and Mary. He grew up in Arkansas alongside his three sisters. Growing up Eudy was a multi sport athlete competing in baseball, basketball and gridiron football. Eudy was offered a scholarship to play football at Arkansas State. He decided to try out for the newly formed Memphis Showboats franchise, of the USFL. He nearly made the team, being the last player to get cut. Before becoming a pro wrestler Eudy also worked as a farmer and studied to become a pilot in order to become a crop duster at the farm he worked at.

== Professional wrestling career ==
=== Early career (1987–1989) ===
Eudy entered wrestling after an encounter with Randy Savage and his brother Lanny Poffo. He was trained by Tojo Yamamoto. Eudy began his career in Continental Championship Wrestling (CCW) in 1987 under the masked wrestler persona "Lord Humungous", teaming with Austin Idol and wrestled the team of Nick Bockwinkel and Jerry Lawler. On Christmas Day 1987, Sid won the NWA Southeastern Heavyweight Championship. Later, he turned into a fan favorite after rekindling a (kayfabe) childhood friendship with Shane Douglas, resulting in the two forming a tag team and capturing the NWA Southeastern Tag Team Championship.

In December 1988, Eudy had a brief stint in the Texas-based World Class Championship Wrestling (WCCW) promotion, where he adopted one of his most notable ring names: Sid Vicious, which he took from the punk rock musician of the same name who played bass for the Sex Pistols.

In February-March 1989, Eudy competed in Japan for New Japan Pro-Wrestling (NJPW) as part of its "Big Fight Series" under the name "Vicious Warrior". In his first match for NJPW, he unsuccessfully challenged Tatsumi Fujinami for the IWGP Heavyweight Championship in the Ryōgoku Kokugikan in Tokyo.

=== NWA World Championship Wrestling (1989–1991) ===
==== The Skyscrapers (1989) ====
In 1989, Eudy signed with World Championship Wrestling, where he retained his "Sid Vicious" ring name. He made his televised debut in WCW by defeating DeWayne Bruce on the June 17, 1989, episode of WCW Pro. Later that month, Eudy was paired with Danny Spivey to form The Skyscrapers, a tag team managed by Teddy Long. The Skyscrapers feuded with the Road Warriors and the Steiner Brothers. During that time, he incorporated the powerbomb as his finishing move. The team was short-lived, as Eudy was replaced by "Mean" Mark Callous after breaking a rib and puncturing a lung during a match with the Steiner Brothers on November 15 at Clash of the Champions IX.

==== Four Horsemen (1990–1991) ====
After recovering from injury, Eudy was introduced on the May 11, 1990, episode of NWA Power Hour as the newest member of Ric Flair's Four Horsemen. Sid was the "muscle" of the group and initially brought in to counter-act the strength of RoboCop at Capital Combat. His first televised match back was a 26-second loss to Lex Luger on June 13 at Clash of the Champions XI: Coastal Crush after the referee performed a fast three count.

As one of the Horsemen, Eudy feuded with Paul Orndorff and the Junkyard Dog. He attacked NWA World Heavyweight Champion Sting following the champion's title match at Clash of the Champions XII in September, setting up his first feud as a singles wrestler. On October 27 at Halloween Havoc, a fake Sting (Barry Windham), in collusion with Sid, let Sid pin him after switching places with the real Sting for Sid to win the belt. They were thwarted when the real Sting came out and beat Sid to retain the title.

Sid's association with the Four Horsemen became tenuous following this episode, and he began a quasi-face run on November 20, when he defeated The Nightstalker at Clash of the Champions XIII: Thanksgiving Thunder. On December 16, The Skyscrapers had a short-lived reunion when Sid and former partner Spivey defeated Big Cat and the Motor City Madman at Starrcade '90: Collision Course. Following this match, Eudy made an abrupt return to heel status, squashing Joey Maggs at Clash of the Champions XIV: Dixie Dynamite on January 30, 1991. He returned to full-fledged Horsemen activity and participated in the WarGames match on February 24 at WrestleWar. The Horsemen amicably split in April, during which time he entered negotiations with the WWF. Despite a huge contract offer and a promise of a world championship run, Eudy announced his intentions to leave WCW. Eudy left WCW after his match with El Gigante on May 19, 1991, at SuperBrawl I.

=== World Wrestling Federation (1991–1992) ===
At a Superstars taping on May 28, 1991, Eudy made his WWF debut in an untelevised segment, attacking The Mountie following Mountie's open offer. On the June 8 episode of Prime Time Wrestling, vignettes began airing promoting his WWF debut and introducing him as Sid Justice. Sid made his debut on WWF television on the July 20 episode of Superstars. On August 26 at SummerSlam, he served as the guest referee in a handicap match pitting Ultimate Warrior and the WWF Champion Hulk Hogan against the Triangle of Terror (Sgt. Slaughter, Colonel Mustafa, and General Adnan). Later that night, Sid saved Randy Savage and Miss Elizabeth from an attack at the hands of Jake "The Snake" Roberts and The Undertaker at the newly wed couple's reception. During this time, Sid defeated Kato in his first televised match on the September 21 episode of Superstars.

Sid competed for the vacant WWF Championship in the Royal Rumble match on January 19, 1992. Sid entered at No. 29 and was among the final four wrestlers, along with Hogan, Randy Savage, and Ric Flair, before he eliminated both Savage and then Hogan, leaving himself and Flair in the ring. Hogan, who was still at ringside after being eliminated, grabbed Sid's arm and tried to pull him over the top rope, giving Flair the chance to grab Sid's legs and throw him out to win the match and become the new WWF Champion.

Less than a week later, on the January 25 episode of Superstars, WWF President Jack Tunney held a press conference to determine Flair's opponent at WrestleMania VIII. Before Tunney revealed his decision, Sid stood up as if Tunney called his name. Yet to Sid's annoyance, Tunney chose Hogan, giving a menacing glance in Hogan's direction and calling Tunney's decision "bogus". Sid later apologized to Hogan and teamed up with him to face The Undertaker and Flair on Saturday Night's Main Event XXX. During the match, after he double clotheslined Undertaker and Flair, Hogan reached to Sid for a tag. Sid refused and walked out of the match, turning heel in the process. Hogan won the match by disqualification.

On the February 23 episode of Wrestling Challenge, Sid appeared as a guest on Brutus "The Barber" Beefcake's "The Barber Shop". Knowing that Hulk Hogan (Beefcake's long-time real-life friend) was not in the arena, Sid threatened Beefcake and chased him off the set before destroying the Barber Shop with a chair. Later that night, Hogan was scheduled to battle Sid (and not WWF Champion Ric Flair) at WrestleMania VIII. Sid acquired Harvey Wippleman as his manager and began a post-match gimmick where he would further (kayfabe) injure his defeated opponents with one or more powerbombs, and sometimes–after the defeated wrestler placed on a stretcher–following it up by grabbing the stretcher and running it into a fixture, such as a ring post or guardrail.

Prior to his WrestleMania match with Hogan, Sid failed a drug test. He was allowed to do the match and then went on their European tour, after which he was told he was going to serve his suspension. At WrestleMania VIII on April 5, Sid lost to Hogan by disqualification when Wippleman jumped into the ring to get involved. After the match, Sid and Papa Shango attacked Hogan until the returning Ultimate Warrior stormed the ring and saved Hogan.

After WrestleMania, Sid was about to embark on a feud with Ultimate Warrior, the story being that Sid was angry at Warrior for saving Hogan at WrestleMania VIII. Eudy wrestled Warrior at two house shows, both of which Warrior won by disqualification. After wrestling Warrior in Boston, Massachusetts on April 26, Eudy quit the company due to disagreements with Warrior and WWF management in particular about the outcome of his match with Warrior; Eudy took issue with the fact that Warrior was booked to kick out of his powerbomb, feeling it rendered his finishing maneuver useless. Eudy also cited unhappiness with his pay as a reason for quitting, as WWF paid the wrestlers a percentage of the live gates as opposed to guaranteed money like WCW, and the WWF house show crowds were shrinking at the time, leading to smaller gates and smaller payoffs for the talent. There were also claims made by the WWF that Eudy refused to take drug tests, which Eudy denied. The WWF replaced Sid with Papa Shango in the feud with Warrior.

=== World Championship Wrestling (1993) ===
On May 23, 1993, Eudy, now back under the "Sid Vicious" ring name, returned to WCW as a mystery competitor of Colonel Robert Parker against Van Hammer at Slamboree '93: A Legends' Reunion. That summer, he teamed with Big Van Vader and reignited his feud with Sting. On September 19 at Fall Brawl '93: War Games, Sting's team (Sting, Davey Boy Smith, Dustin Rhodes, and The Shockmaster) defeated Sid's team (Sid, Vader, and Harlem Heat) in a WarGames match. At Halloween Havoc on October 24, Sid faced Sting but was defeated via a roll-up.

After this, Sid turned face and was scheduled to challenge then WCW World Heavyweight Champion Vader at Starrcade '93: 10th Anniversary and win the title. However, Sid's WCW contract was terminated following an altercation with Marty Lunde, better known as Arn Anderson, during an October 1993 tour of Europe. According to Sid, the argument started at a hotel bar following a house show in Blackburn, England, after Eudy made disparaging remarks about Ric Flair, one of Lunde's closest friends. Eudy and Lunde began an argument, which led to Lunde throwing beer in Sid's face and threatening him with a broken glass mug.

Everyone was sent to their rooms by security, but an enraged Eudy came to Lunde's room and attacked him with a broken-off chair leg, leading to Lunde's retaliation with a pair of scissors. Eudy received four stab wounds and Anderson received 20, losing a pint and a half of blood in the process. The fight was broken up by fellow wrestler 2 Cold Scorpio, who was credited with saving Lunde's life. The British Crown Prosecution Service declined to press charges against either man since both men would soon be leaving the country. Both men eventually made full recoveries.

=== United States Wrestling Association (1994–1996) ===
After his departure from WCW, Sid moved to the United States Wrestling Association (USWA) in Memphis, where he began feuding with old rival Jerry Lawler. On July 16, 1994, he won the promotion's Unified World Heavyweight Championship by forfeit when Lawler, who had been attacked and injured by Sid earlier in the card, could not appear for the scheduled match. While Lawler was able to defeat Eudy in non-title matches, Sid was able to retain his title in several championship defenses through screwjobs initiated by The Spellbinder, his ally at the time. Sid also participated in the UWF Blackjack Brawl on September 23, 1994, challenging "Dr. Death" Steve Williams for the UWF World Heavyweight Championship. On February 6, 1995, Lawler won the USWA Unified World Heavyweight Championship back from Sid. Sid regained the title from Lawler on August 30, 1996, before relinquishing the title back to Lawler on September 2.

=== World Wrestling Federation (1995–1997) ===
==== Alliance with Shawn Michaels and Million Dollar Corporation (1995) ====
On the February 20, 1995, episode of Raw is War Eudy-now under the moniker "Psycho Sid" (later changed to "Sycho Sid")-returned to the WWF as the bodyguard of Shawn Michaels. Along with Jenny McCarthy, Sid accompanied Michaels to ringside for Michaels' WWF Championship match against then-champion and Michaels's former bodyguard, Diesel, at WrestleMania XI. Michaels had hit his signature Superkick, but Sid stood on the ring apron and distracted referee Earl Hebner, allowing Diesel time to recover and pin Michaels after a Jackknife Powerbomb to win the match and retain his title. The next night on Raw, Michaels expressed dissatisfaction with Sid's interference and gave him the night off for his rematch against Diesel. In response, Sid yelled at Shawn and attacked Michaels from behind before hitting him with a powerbomb three times, turning Michaels into a face again.

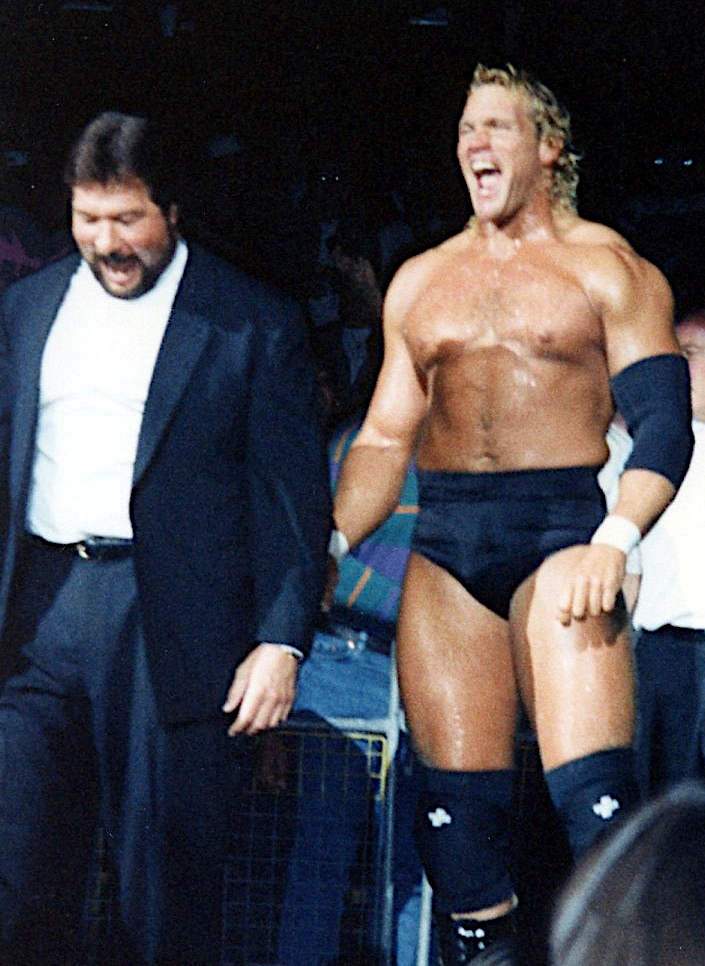
Sycho Sid joined Ted DiBiase (left) and his Million Dollar Corporation in 1995.

Two weeks later on the April 17 episode of Raw, Ted DiBiase introduced Sid as the "crown jewel" of the Million Dollar Corporation. Sid challenged Diesel to a match for the WWF Championship at the first In Your House pay-per-view on May 14, where Diesel won the match via disqualification, and thus retained his title, when Tatanka interfered. After the match, Sid and Tatanka continued to double-team Diesel until Bam Bam Bigelow came out to save him. At King of the Ring on June 15, Sid and Tatanka lost to Diesel and Bigelow.

On July 23, Sid faced Diesel once again at In Your House 2: The Lumberjacks for the WWF Championship in a lumberjack match, which Diesel won to end the feud. Following this, Sid moved on to a feud with Shawn Michaels and was scheduled to face him at SummerSlam, but was replaced by Razor Ramon at the request of WWF President Gorilla Monsoon, with Ramon challenging for Michaels' Intercontinental Championship in a ladder match as Sid was seen watching on the backstage television monitors. On the September 5 episode of Raw, Sid faced Michaels for the title but lost after being hit with three superkicks. Sid then started a brief feud with Henry Godwinn, culminating in a victory over Godwinn on September 24 at In Your House 3: Triple Header.

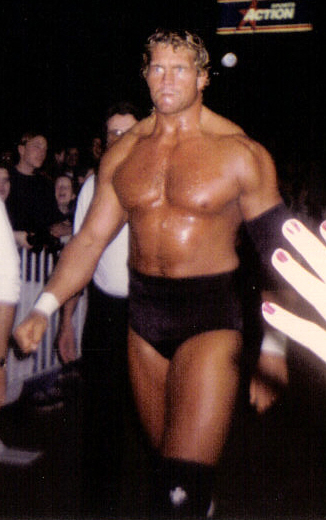
Sycho Sid in 1995

On the November 13 episode of Raw, Sid faced Intercontinental Champion Razor Ramon in a non-title match, with Ramon's friend The 1–2–3 Kid as the special guest referee. Razor was about to deliver the Razor's Edge on Sid, but The 1–2–3 Kid helped Sid avoid it, allowing Sid to pin Ramon after a powerbomb, with the Kid making a fast count. After the match, the Kid turned heel and joined the Million Dollar Corporation.

In the first elimination match at Survivor Series on November 19, Sid and Corporation leader Ted DiBiase helped The 1–2–3 Kid pin Marty Jannetty to win and become the sole survivor for his team. Later in the event, Sid was randomly teamed up with his rival Shawn Michaels, Ahmed Johnson, and The British Bulldog to face Yokozuna, Owen Hart, Razor Ramon, and Dean Douglas in a "Wild Card" Survivor Series match. Sid was eliminated by Razor Ramon after Michaels hit Sid with a superkick. After his elimination, Sid powerbombed Michaels. On December 17 at In Your House 5: Seasons Beatings, Razor Ramon and Marty Jannetty defeated Sid and The 1–2–3 Kid. Sid and The 1–2–3 Kid teamed up the next night to participate in the first-ever Raw Bowl, which The Smoking Gunns won. Shortly after, he left the WWF, claiming a neck injury.

==== WWF Champion (1996–1997) ====
Eudy was not seen again until the July 8, 1996, episode of Raw. Under the Sycho Sid variation of his Sid gimmicks, Eudy was a strident-voiced and intense character, prone to erratically unstable mannerisms, such as in his random contemplative stares off into the distance, excessive eye-blinking, laughter turned sudden seriousness, and menacing fist bumps with fans during entrances. In his return, he replaced Ultimate Warrior (who left the WWF) for a six-man tag team match, teaming with former rival Shawn Michaels and Ahmed Johnson against Vader, Owen Hart, and The British Bulldog in the main event of In Your House 9: International Incident on July 21, effectively making him a face. Sid's team lost the match. The next night on Raw, Sid started a feud with The British Bulldog, whom he defeated at SummerSlam on August 18.

At In Your House 10: Mind Games on September 22, during the WWF Championship match between Michaels and Mankind, Michaels went for the pinfall on Mankind until Vader came out, broke up the count and attacked him, which got Mankind disqualified. After the match, Mankind and Vader double-teamed Michaels until Sid came out to make the save and brawled with Vader backstage. On October 20 at In Your House 11: Buried Alive, Sid defeated Vader despite interference from his manager Jim Cornette, earning a match against Michaels for the WWF Championship at Survivor Series.

On November 17 at Survivor Series, Sid grabbed a camera from the operator and prepared to hit Michaels with it. Michaels' manager, Jose Lothario, got on the ring apron and told Sid to put the camera down, but he refused and hit Lothario in the chest with it instead. Although this was the act of a heel, the audience cheered wildly for him and booed Michaels, just as they had done, in Sid's favor, four and a half years earlier against Hogan at the Royal Rumble. After dropping the camera and turning around, Michaels hit him with the Sweet Chin Music, then went outside the ring to check on his manager instead of going for the pin. Sid hit Michaels in the back with the camera, then threw him back in the ring before hitting him with a powerbomb to win the WWF Championship.

At In Your House 12: It's Time on December 15, Sid defended the title against Bret Hart. Hart made Sid tap out to the Sharpshooter, but the referee was knocked out and unable to witness the submission. As Michaels was commentating at ringside, Sid and Hart left the ring and started fighting right beside him. After Sid had pushed Michaels and then climbed into the ring with Hart, Michaels went to hit Sid but the latter threw Hart into him. He then pinned him after a powerbomb to retain the title.

At the Royal Rumble on January 19, 1997, Sid lost the WWF Championship to Michaels. During the match, Sid hit the chokeslam on Michaels and repeatedly powerbombed him outside the ring. Jose Lothario got on the ring apron and was approached by Sid, but before he could do anything to him, Michaels hit Sid in the back and the face with the camera, knocking him out. Michaels went for the pin, but Sid managed to kick out, only for Michaels to hit him with Sweet Chin Music to win the championship. After Michaels forfeited that same title three weeks later, a four corners elimination title match was held for the vacant championship between Bret Hart, The Undertaker, Stone Cold Steve Austin and Vader at In Your House 13: Final Four on February 16, which Hart won.

The next night on Raw, Sid fought Hart for the championship. During the match, Hart had Sid trapped in the Sharpshooter submission when Austin, whom Hart was feuding with, came to the outside of the ring and hit Hart with a steel chair, allowing Sid to hit Hart with the powerbomb to win the WWF Championship for the second time. Sid successfully defended the title against Mankind and Hart in a Steel Cage match on the March 3 and 17 episodes of Raw, respectively.

At WrestleMania 13 on March 23, Sid lost the WWF Championship to The Undertaker after interference from Hart. He was scheduled to wrestle Hart at the April in Your House and Mankind in May, before both matches were cancelled. He returned on the June 2 episode of Raw, where he failed to regain the title from the Undertaker. At King of the Ring on June 8, Sid and The Legion of Doom lost to The Hart Foundation (Owen Hart, The British Bulldog, and Jim Neidhart) in a six-man tag team match after Owen pinned Sid with a roll-up. Sid defeated Owen the next night on Raw before disappearing from television for over a month, making a brief final appearance on July 14. He was released by the WWF once again in the summer to recover from a neck injury.

=== Indie circuit and Extreme Championship Wrestling (1998–1999) ===
After being inactive for nearly a year, Sid wrestled on the independent circuit in Mississippi and New Jersey. He defeated King Kong Bundy at the Eddie Gilbert Memorial Brawl on February 28, 1998. Eudy debuted in Extreme Championship Wrestling (ECW) in January 1999, where he had matches with The Dudley Boyz, John Kronus, Skull Von Krush and Justin Credible. He left ECW in May due to the monetary problems plaguing the promotion.

=== World Championship Wrestling (1999–2001) ===
==== Millennium Man; United States Heavyweight Champion (1999) ====
Eudy returned to WCW at The Great American Bash in on June 13, 1999, joining Randy Savage's heel stable Team Madness. Upon his return, he took the nickname of the "Millennium Man" and faced WCW World Champion Kevin Nash on the July 5, 1999, episode of WCW Nitro. Sid was dubbed as undefeated having a winning streak much like Goldberg had previously; although, the majority of this streak was due to Sid coming to the ring and powerbombing wrestlers already in a match or immediately following their match and thus "defeating" them.

On September 12, Sid won his first and only WCW United States Heavyweight Championship from Chris Benoit at Fall Brawl. He then began a feud with Goldberg, who challenged him for the United States Heavyweight Championship on October 24 at Halloween Havoc. Earlier that night, their backstage fighting led Sid to require stitches, though he refused to be treated, which led to Sid bleeding openly the entire night. After brawling with Goldberg, a weary Sid lost the match due to excessive bleeding, awarding Goldberg the title against his opponent's will. Sid lost again to Goldberg in an "I Quit" match at Mayhem on November 21, effectively ending their feud and Sid's "streak." WCW later released a VHS home video highlighting Sid's return to WCW called Sid Vicious: Millennium Man.

==== WCW World Heavyweight Champion (2000) ====
Sid turned face after the "Millennium Man" gimmick ran dry. He was placed in a match at Souled Out on January 16, 2000, to fill the suddenly vacant WCW World Heavyweight Championship after Bret Hart was forced to relinquish it due to a concussion. Sid lost to Chris Benoit, but the title was again vacated as Benoit left for the WWF the next day. The on-screen explanation was that Sid's foot was under the rope during his submission loss.

On January 24, Sid was presented with a challenge by Nash, who had become commissioner of WCW. If he could beat Don and Ron Harris on Nitro that night, he would face Nash for the championship that night. Sid defeated the Harris Brothers and eventually Nash himself to win the WCW World Heavyweight Championship. Two nights later on WCW Thunder, Nash stripped Sid of the championship due to him not beating the legal Harris brother in the match on Nitro. Later that night, Sid defeated Nash in a Caged heat match to win the title for a second time. On February 20, he retained the title at SuperBrawl in a three-way match against Scott Hall and Jeff Jarrett.

At Uncensored on March 19, Sid successfully defended his title against Jarrett with help from a returning Hulk Hogan. On the following night's Nitro, during a tag team match pitting Sid and Hogan against Jarrett and Scott Steiner, Sid turned heel and attacked Hogan, due to him being incensed that the fans were chanting Hogan's name. He chokeslammed Hogan and forced the referee to count Hogan being pinned, although the official result was a no contest. Shortly after this, WCW began its New Blood angle and on April 10, Sid (along with all the other WCW champions at the time) was stripped of his championship. He did not play a large role in the angle that followed, and was kept off of television for several months.

==== Injury and first retirement (2000–2001) ====
Sid returned on the November 27 episode of Nitro, revealing himself as the challenger for Scott Steiner's WCW World Heavyweight Championship at Starrcade. At Starrcade on December 17, Sid failed to win the title.

On January 14, 2001, at the WCW Sin pay-per-view in Indianapolis at Conseco Fieldhouse, Sid faced Steiner, Jeff Jarrett and Road Warrior Animal in a four corners match for the WCW World Heavyweight Championship. During the match, he had a near career-ending injury. WCW executive John Laurinaitis allegedly felt that Eudy needed to broaden his arsenal of wrestling moves and suggested that he try an aerial maneuver, despite his unwillingness and disbelief that a wrestler of his shape should do highspots.

His leg fractured following a leap from the second turnbuckle in an attempted big boot on Steiner. This had him awkwardly landing with all his weight on one foot while kicking with the other, severely fracturing the leg on which he landed. Eudy broke his left leg in half, snapping both the tibia and fibula, with at least one of the bones breaking through the skin and rotating his foot without his input at 90 degrees anti-clockwise. The fracture was too graphic for many television stations to re-air, although it was shown on the following Nitro.

The injury put Sid out of action indefinitely, and he pondered retiring from wrestling for good: "I had about a year left on my contract, and I was thinking back then prior to hurting my leg what was I going to do as far as wrapping up my career. The only thing I really wanted to do was ideally go out in a big pay-per-view, like a WrestleMania or something like that main event, leave like that, and not come back again. It would really be the retirement match". A 17-inch (43 cm) rod was placed in his leg during the two-hour surgery.

Sid later sued WCW, claiming that he was made to jump off the second rope against his objections. The injury forced a plot change in the SuperBrawl Revenge event. The main event was supposed to be Kevin Nash, Diamond Dallas Page, and Sid against Scott Steiner, Jeff Jarrett, and Road Warrior Animal but was rewritten as Kevin Nash against Scott Steiner. Sid left WCW, before WCW closed down the following month after the final episode of Monday Nitro on March 26, 2001.

=== Recovery and later career (2002–2017) ===
"That's when I found out about it, that's when they told me." "I was told I would never run again." "To me running is more important than working out." "That's when it hit me that this was going to be a tough deal."

— Sid Eudy during an interview with Andrew Pritchard on PWInsider.com in 2008

After WCW was bought by the WWF in March 2001 and following surgery, Eudy was faced with the prospect of rehabilitation of his leg for three to five days per week for at least the next year. He was told by his doctor that he would never run again, and Sid set a goal of being able to do so. At first he was limited to using a cane, but through extensive effort he was able to walk again, and in time, run. During his arduous rehabilitation, he made several appearances as World Wrestling All-Stars's (WWA) commissioner during its 2002 Australian tour, at the beginning of WWA's Sydney show. Sid also filed a lawsuit with the Universal Wrestling Corporation, the Turner holding company for what remained of WCW's unpurchased assets, seeking redress for the injury that he sustained. The judge ultimately ruled in favor of the UWC.

Eudy returned to active wrestling in 2004 with the Canadian-based Internet Wrestling Syndicate. On July 14, 2007, Eudy debuted in Memphis Wrestling and started a feud with old rival Jerry Lawler while serving as "Hollywood" Jimmy Blaylock's enforcer. Sid appeared at the Juggalo Championship Wrestling event Evansville Invasion on October 6, helping Tracy Smothers attack the promotion's Heavyweight Champion Corporal Robinson.

On November 7, 2008, Sid faced Lawler in the main event of the "Jerry Lawler 35th Anniversary Wrestling event" at the Tennessee Fairgrounds, where he was defeated. On February 28, 2009, Eudy returned to Memphis Wrestling and won a battle royal before defeating Lawler in a rematch. Following this, Eudy's appearances were greatly reduced as he began focusing on competition in over-50 bodybuilding.

He appeared in the Mid Southern Championship Wrestling on August 18, 2009, in Osceola. There he teamed with Pokerface against Scott Hall & Lord Humongous, the latter a revival of the gimmick formerly portrayed by Sid. In this match it marked the debut of Sid's son Gunnar Eudy. Humongous and Hall won via disqualification after Sid hit the referee. Sid and Pokerface faced Humongous and Hall again in Jonesboro, AR on September 19, 2009, but again were defeated.

Sid wrestled three times in 2010 and 2011, defeating Chase Stevens, Josef von Schmidt, and Eddie Kingston.

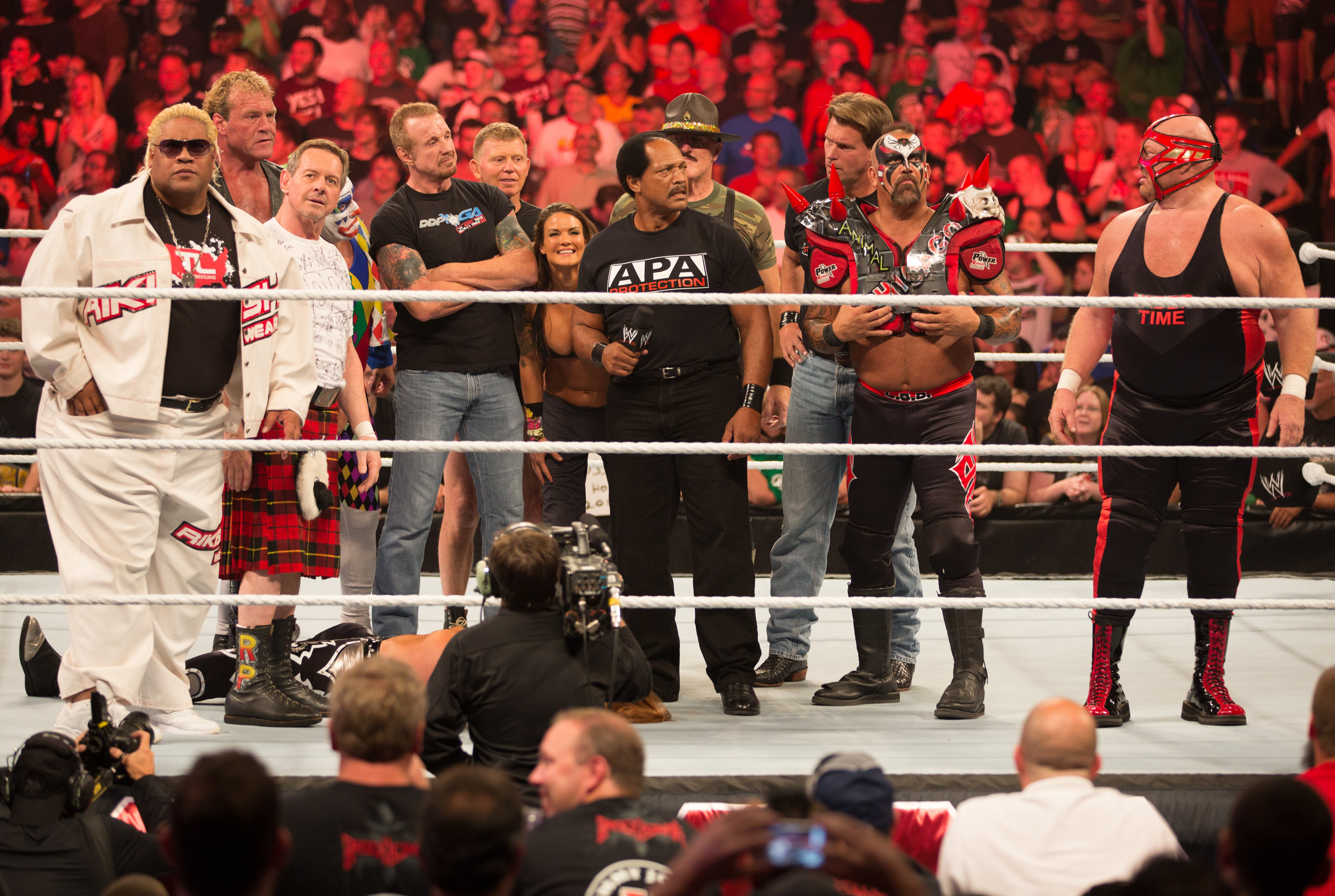
Eudy (second from left) with other WWE alumni at Raw 1000 in 2012

On the June 25, 2012, episode of Raw, Eudy made his return to WWE as Sycho Sid in a match against Heath Slater, where he defeated Slater as part of the ongoing celebration building up to WWE's 1000th episode of Raw. It was his first appearance on Raw since the July 14, 1997, episode and his first match on the show since June 9, 1997. Eudy would reappear at Raw 1000 on July 23, where he and other WWE legends helped Lita take down Slater.

On August 5, 2017, Sid wrestled the last match of his career defeating Paul Rosenberg in Ottawa, Ontario, for Great North Wrestling.

== Personal life ==
Eudy and his wife, Sabrina Paige (née Estes), were married on December 30, 1983, in Shelby County, Tennessee. Frank, a cast member on the CBS reality show Big Brother 14 and 18, and Gunnar Eudy, who is also a wrestler, are their sons. He had three grandchildren. At the time of his death, Eudy lived with his wife in Marion, Arkansas.

Eudy was a fan of softball, which he briefly played during his time off from wrestling between 1997 and 1999.

=== Legal issues ===
In January 2011, Eudy was arrested in Shelby County. Initially pulled over for and charged with not wearing his seatbelt, Eudy was also charged with misdemeanor possession of marijuana and driving without a license. He was later released on $1,000 bond.

=== Death and legacy ===
On August 26, 2024, Eudy died of non-Hodgkin's lymphoma at the age of 63. Previously, he had been diagnosed with congestive heart failure and atrial fibrillation. That night, a video package paying tribute to Eudy aired during an episode of WWE Raw, with Damian Priest paying tribute by claiming during an in ring segment with Rhea Ripley "we are the masters and rulers of this world" before they each simultaneously performed Sid's trademark chokeslam and powerbomb. Many other tributes came in from other professional wrestlers such as Diamond Dallas Page, Shawn Michaels and Jake Roberts who stated "What an incredible look and presence. He certainly left his mark on our business."

Eudy was posthumously inducted into the WWE Hall of Fame in 2026. However his son Gunnar was critical on the WWE's handling of his induction stating "Sid’s induction felt rushed and treated like an afterthought rather than a celebration of a major star from wrestling’s past."

== Other media ==
Eudy made an appearance in the 2000 film Ready to Rumble alongside David Arquette and Scott Caan. In 2011, he starred alongside fellow wrestlers Kurt Angle and Kevin Nash in the horror film River of Darkness. He starred in the 2011 horror film Death from Above, alongside fellow wrestlers Kurt Angle, James Storm, Matt Morgan, Terry Gerin, and Jessica Kresa. On August 2, 2012, he appeared on the CBS reality show Big Brother 14 in which his son, Frank, was a contestant.

Eudy was a playable character in the NES version of WWF WrestleMania: Steel Cage Challenge, the Game Boy game WWF Superstars 2 and the SNES version of WWF Super Wrestlemania. For WCW he appeared in WCW Backstage Assault. He was a playable character in both Legends of Wrestling II and Showdown: Legends of Wrestling as well.

Eudy appears as Sycho Sid in WWE 2K17, as downloadable content. Sid is part of the roster in WWE 2K18 , WWE 2K19 and as downloadable content in WWE 2K25 as Sid Justice.

A photo of Eudy in the ring features on the cover art of the Westside Gunn album Still Praying.

=== Filmography ===
Year	Title	Role	Notes
1990	Family Feud	Himself	Credited as Sid Vicious
2000	Ready to Rumble	Himself	Credited as Sid Vicious
2011	Death from Above	Herzog	Credited as Sid Vicious
2011	River of Darkness	Jonah Jacobs	Credited as Sycho Sid

=== Video games ===
Year	Game	Note
1992	WWF Super WrestleMania	Video game debut, cover athlete
1992	WWF WrestleFest	
1992	WWF WrestleMania: Steel Cage Challenge	
2000	WCW Backstage Assault	
2002	Legends of Wrestling II	
2004	Showdown: Legends of Wrestling	
2010	WWE SmackDown vs. Raw 2011	
2016	WWE 2k17	
2017	WWE 2k18	
2018	WWE 2k19	
2025	WWE 2k25	DLC
2026	WWE 2k26	

== Championships and accomplishments ==
- American Wrestling Federation
  - AWF Super Heavyweight Championship (1 time)
- Continental Wrestling Association
  - CWA Heavyweight Championship (1 time)
- NWA Northeast
  - NWA Northeast Heavyweight Championship (1 time)
- Pro Wrestling Illustrated
  - Comeback of the Year (1996)
  - Ranked No. 16 of the top 500 singles wrestlers in the PWI 500 in 1991
  - Ranked No. 122 of the top 500 singles wrestlers of the "PWI Years" in 2003
- Southeastern Championship Wrestling
  - NWA Southeastern Heavyweight Championship (Northern Division) (1 time)
  - NWA Southeastern Tag Team Championship (1 time) – with Shane Douglas
- United States Wrestling Association
  - USWA Texas Heavyweight Championship (1 time)
  - USWA Unified World Heavyweight Championship (2 times)
- World Championship Wrestling
  - WCW World Heavyweight Championship (2 times)
  - WCW United States Heavyweight Championship (1 times)
- World Wrestling Federation/WWE
  - WWF Championship (2 times)
  - WWE Hall of Fame (Class of 2026)
- Wrestling Observer Newsletter
  - Most Overrated (1993)
  - Readers' Least Favorite Wrestler (1993)
  - Worst on Interviews (1999)
  - Worst Worked Match of the Year (1990) vs. The Nightstalker
