= Jimmy Hart =

American musician, professional wrestling manager, and sports businessman (born 1944)

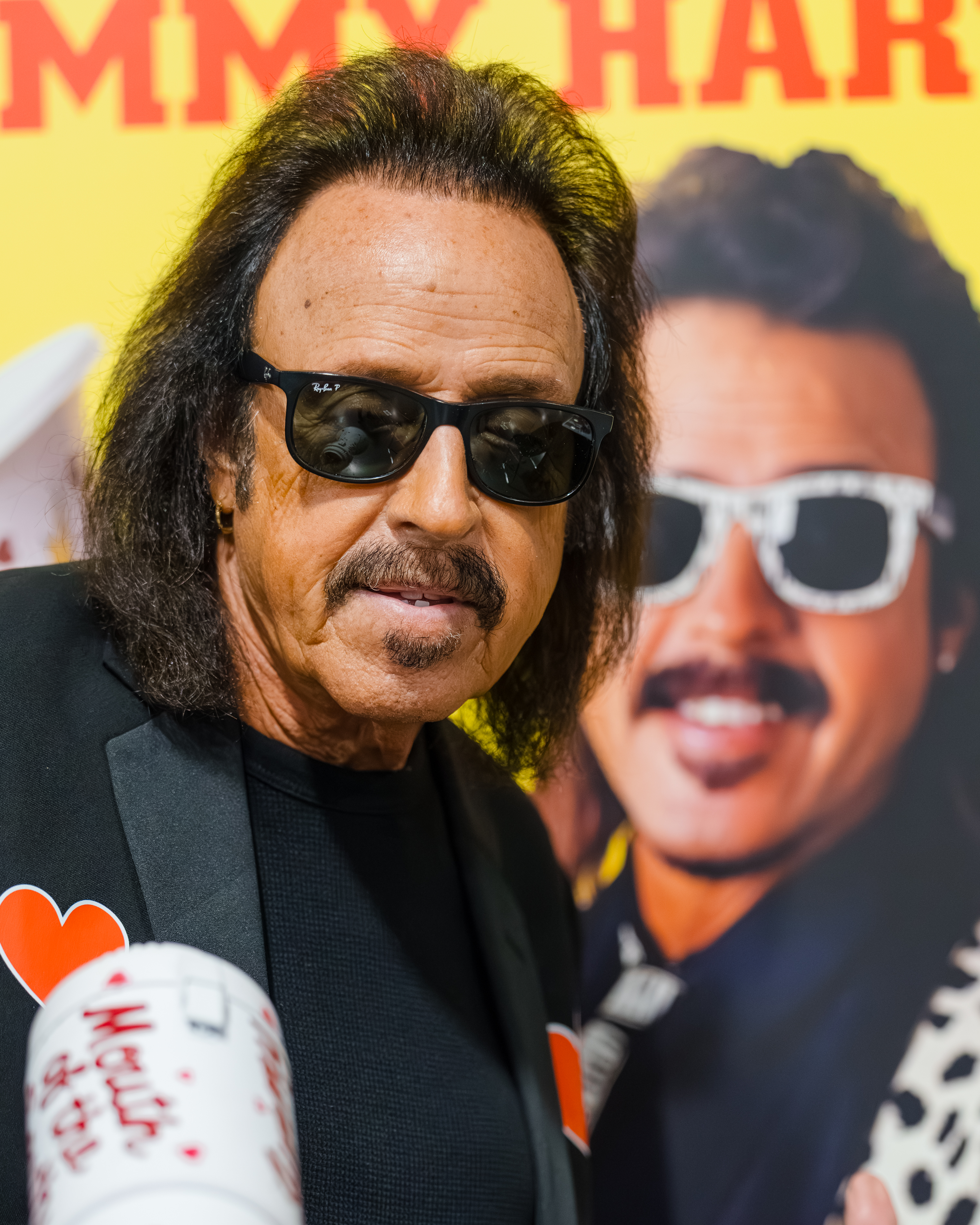
- Hart at GalaxyCon Nashville in 2026

Personal information
- Born: James Ray Hart; January 1, 1944 (age 82) Jackson, Mississippi, U.S.

Professional wrestling career
- Ring name(s): Jimmy Hart; The Mouth of the South; The Colonel; The Memphis Chicken
- Billed height: 5 ft 10 in (1.78 m)
- Billed weight: 166 lb (75 kg)
- Billed from: Memphis, Tennessee

James Ray "Jimmy" Hart (born January 1, 1944) is an American professional wrestling manager, executive, composer, and musician. He is signed to WWE in a Legends deal. He is best known for his work in Memphis Wrestling, the World Wrestling Federation (WWF; renamed WWE in 2002) and World Championship Wrestling (WCW). He is known by the nickname "the Mouth of the South" (also given to Ted Turner). He was the AWA Southern Heavyweight Champion for five days in 1981.

Hart has managed numerous prominent wrestlers including Andy Kaufman, Randy Savage, The Honky Tonk Man, Greg Valentine, Jerry "the King" Lawler, "The Million Dollar Man" Ted DiBiase, Irwin R. Schyster, The Mountie, The Natural Disasters, Dino Bravo, The Nasty Boys, The Giant, Hulk Hogan, and Hart Foundation members Bret Hart and Jim Neidhart.

Before becoming involved with professional wrestling, Jimmy Hart was a member of the rock band the Gentrys. He also composed theme songs for multiple WWE wrestlers and released his own album, Outrageous Conduct, in 1985.

== Career ==
=== Music ===
James Hart was born in Jackson, Mississippi, on January 1, 1944. His mother was also involved in music and wrote under the name Sadie Sallas, and penned "Enclosed, One Broken Heart", for singer Eddy Arnold in the 1950s. His family later located to Memphis, Tennessee, where he graduated from Treadwell High School.

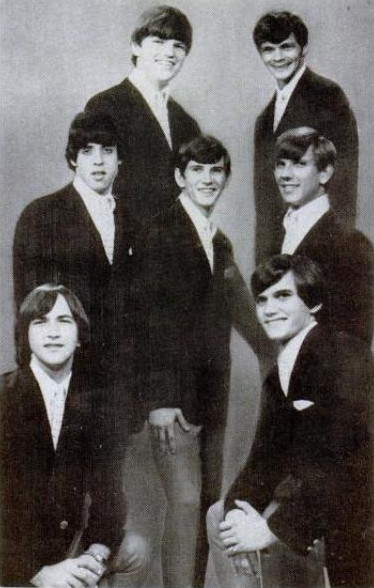
Hart, pictured on the left in the middle row, part of the Gentrys

Hart was a vocalist in the Gentrys, who found success with the release of "Keep on Dancing" in 1965, which sold over a million copies and reached number four on the Billboard Hot 100. Hart was still in high school when he got the call to audition for the group after their previous singer left. After he took the job, they had a few minor hits, most notably "Why Should I Cry" and a cover of Neil Young's "Cinnamon Girl", but they were never able to match the success of "Keep on Dancing". Hart and the band were successful in the Memphis-area nightclub circuit. The group was under contract to Stax Records at the time of its bankruptcy, and Stax could not properly promote them.

=== Memphis Wrestling (1978–1985) ===
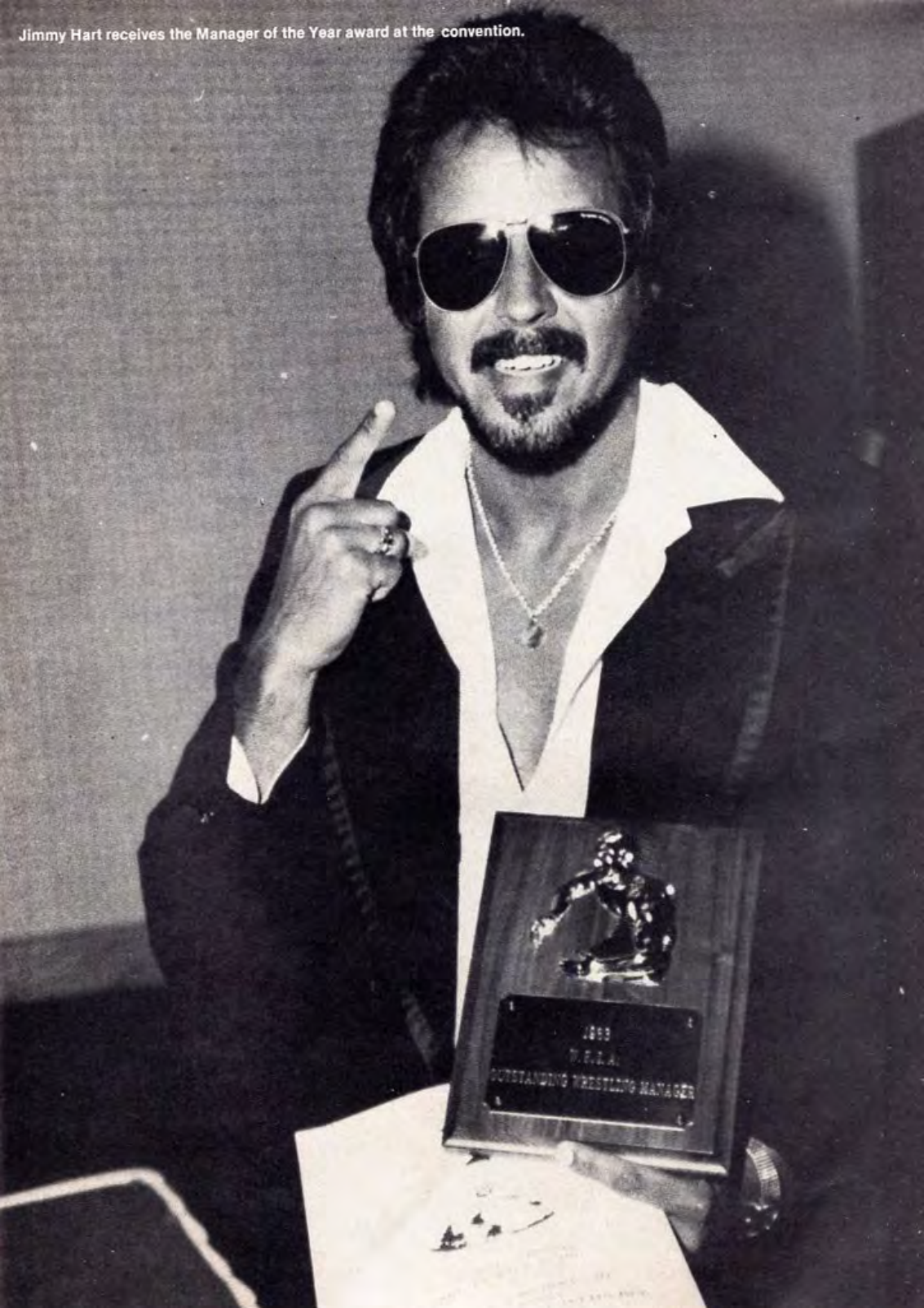
Hart receiving a Manager of the Year Award in July 1984

He was brought into wrestling by Jerry "the King" Lawler, who knew of Hart because both had attended Memphis Treadwell High School. Hart was asked to be a backup singer for Lawler and later became his manager. After splitting from Lawler, Hart created a stable of athletes known as the First Family to attack Lawler, which among others included Hulk Hogan, King Kong Bundy, "Ravishing" Rick Rude, "Leaping" Lanny Poffo, Jim "the Anvil" Neidhart, Ox Baker, Kamala, "Macho Man" Randy Savage, "Hot Stuff" Eddie Gilbert, The Iron Sheik, and Kevin Sullivan.

In 1982, Hart earned national headlines doing a match with comedian and television star Andy Kaufman. Hart, Lawler, and Kaufman would continue this feud for over a year. Hart became known as "the Wimp", a nickname given to him by Lawler and chanted by fans, and was the subject of the song "Wimpbusters", which was sung by Lawler to the tune of "Ghostbusters" by Ray Parker Jr. A music video was also made featuring Lawler, announcer Lance Russell, and wrestlers such as Randy Savage, Jimmy Valiant, Dutch Mantel, Tommy Rich, and Rufus R. Jones, along with footage of Lawler beating Hart and the First Family. In 1981 through 1984, Hart led Austin Idol, Masao Ito, and Gilbert to NWA/AWA International titles.

=== World Wrestling Federation (1985–1993) ===
Hart as the manager of Greg Valentine

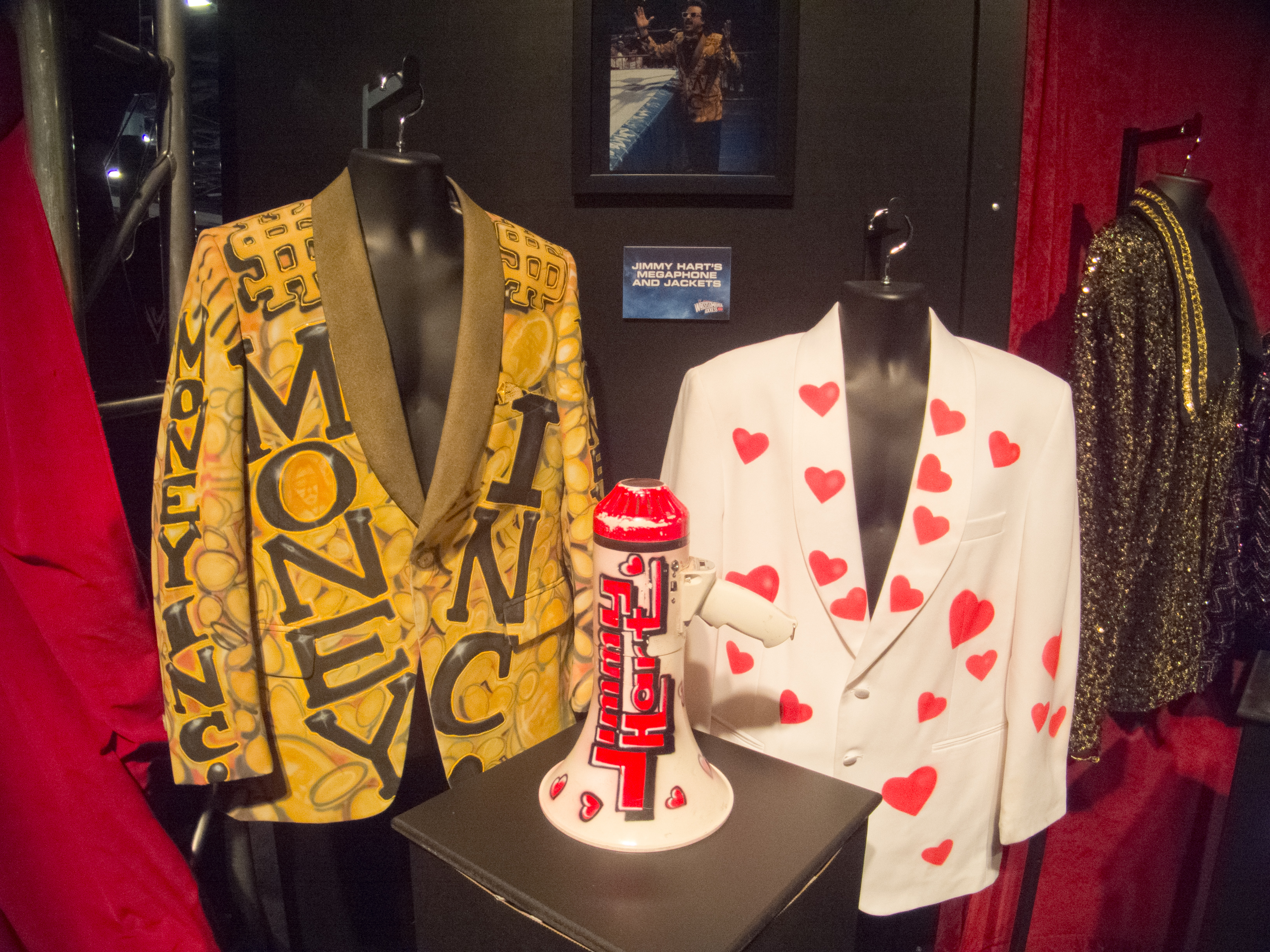
Hart's jackets and megaphone at WrestleMania Axxess

In 1985, Hart's friend, Hillbilly Jim, recommended him to World Wrestling Federation (WWF) owner Vince McMahon, who hired him. He was nicknamed "the Mouth of the South" due to his loose-lipped style, often augmented by his trademark megaphone, which he used as a weapon, and to instruct and encourage his protégés to discourage and annoy opponents and announcers, especially Gorilla Monsoon. Hart's first acquisition in the WWF was Greg Valentine, then the WWF Intercontinental Heavyweight Champion, whom Hart managed at WrestleMania I. After Valentine lost the Intercontinental Heavyweight Title to Tito Santana, Hart briefly co-managed the Dream Team (Valentine and Brutus Beefcake), until he was phased out and gave full control to "Luscious" Johnny Valiant. At WrestleMania, Hart also managed King Kong Bundy as he defeated S. D. Jones. Hart later traded Bundy's contract to Bobby "the Brain" Heenan for The Missing Link and Adrian Adonis. He helped the latter to establish his "Adorable Adrian" gimmick.

Hart also managed Jim "the Anvil" Neidhart. 1985 also marked the appearance of Bret "Hitman" Hart (no relation). Jimmy Hart teamed him up with Jim "the Anvil" Neidhart to form the Hart Foundation. On January 26, 1987, Hart guided the Hart Foundation to the WWF World Tag Team Championship, which they won from the British Bulldogs. Disgraced-referee-turned-wrestler Danny Davis was also managed by Jimmy Hart.

In 1985, Hart took the Funk Family under his wing. The Funks included Terry Funk and Hoss Funk, as well as their kayfabe brother Jimmy Jack Funk. Hart wrestled on house shows with the Funks. On July 12, 1986, Hart won a battle royal to receive $50,000 at Madison Square Garden. When The Honky Tonk Man turned heel, Hart became his manager. In this position, Hart was nicknamed "the Colonel" in reference to Colonel Tom Parker, the manager of Elvis Presley. With Hart in his corner, the Honky Tonk Man captured the WWF Intercontinental Heavyweight Championship from Ricky "the Dragon" Steamboat on June 2, 1987, and held it until August 1988. During that time, the Honky Tonk Man feuded with Randy Savage and his manager Miss Elizabeth. "The Colonel" moniker stuck with him for years, even after the Honky Tonk Man departed the company in early 1991. At WrestleMania III, Hart was involved in three matches and took some bumps during the show. His first appearance was with "Adorable" Adrian Adonis, who fought Rowdy Roddy Piper. Then came the six-man tag match, pitting the Hart Foundation and Danny Davis against the Bulldogs and Tito Santana. Jimmy Hart's third appearance on the show was when the Honky Tonk Man fought Jake "the Snake" Roberts, who had rock legend Alice Cooper in his corner. Following that match, Hart was left alone in the ring, where Roberts and Cooper teamed up to terrorize him with Roberts' pet snake Damien. Also in 1987, Hart managed the WWF Women's Tag Team Champions The Glamour Girls. Martin and Kai mostly feuded with the Jumping Bomb Angels.

Hart was named Pro Wrestling Illustrated's Manager of the Year in 1987, an award he won again in 1994. At WrestleMania IV, Hart received a haircut from Brutus Beefcake, after interfering in the WWF Intercontinental Heavyweight Championship match between Beefcake and the Honky Tonk Man, helping Honky Tonk Man retain the title by getting disqualified.

When the Hart Foundation fired Hart as manager (and turned face) in 1988, Hart managed the Fabulous Rougeau Brothers to feud with his former team; the angle was that Hart still retained the managerial rights to his former team and gave a portion of it to the Rougeaus, giving them the right to appear at ringside whenever the Hart Foundation wrestled. At SummerSlam 1988, Hart accompanied Demolition and Mr. Fuji to help retain their WWF Tag Team title against the Hart Foundation. Ax used Hart's megaphone as a foreign object to strike Bret in the head and secure the victory. In 1989, Hart brought Dino Bravo into his stable after the departure of Frenchy Martin. Then, at a push-up contest between the Ultimate Warrior and Bravo, Hart and Bravo invited a large 460-pound man from the audience–later known as Earthquake–into the ring to sit on the contestants' backs. Earthquake had been planted in the audience by Hart and Bravo, and they eventually teamed up against the Warrior. In 1990, Hart groomed Earthquake to be the man to beat Hulk Hogan. Hart continued his war with his former tag team, the Hart Foundation. In 1990, he combined his protégés Honky Tonk Man and Greg Valentine into the short-lived team of Rhythm and Blues, though they had teamed previously as themselves when facing the Hart Foundation at WrestleMania V. In 1991, he managed The Nasty Boys to defeat the Hart Foundation for the WWF World Tag Team title at WrestleMania VII, this time using a motorbike helmet as a weapon.

When the Nasty Boys lost the title to the Legion of Doom at SummerSlam 1991, Hart sent The Natural Disasters, a team formed out of Earthquake and his former opponent Typhoon (formerly known as Tugboat), to depose the new champions. The Natural Disasters failed to take the title, which led to Hart forming a new team in early 1992: Money Inc., composed of Hart's protégé I.R.S. and "the Million Dollar Man" Ted DiBiase. Money, Inc. defeated the L.O.D. Their title win led to the split between Hart and The Natural Disasters, who, as faces, feuded with Money Inc. and exchanged the tag team titles twice in 1992. Their biggest match came at WrestleMania VIII when Money Inc. retained their titles by leaving the ring and forcing a count-out. In 1991, Hart had also brought in The Mountie, who had a short reign as Intercontinental Heavyweight Champion in early 1992 after defeating Bret Hart on January 17, then losing it just two days later to Rowdy Roddy Piper at the Royal Rumble. A few months earlier, The Mountie feuded with the Big Boss Man over who was the "law and order" in the WWF. Their feud culminated in a match at SummerSlam 1991 where the loser (in this case The Mountie) had to spend the night in a New York City jail. Late in 1992, Money Inc. regained the tag team titles from the Natural Disasters, leading to the Nasty Boys turning on their manager, as he had repeatedly substituted them for Money Inc. in title matches.

Hart broke with Money Inc. on the February 15, 1993 episode of WWF Raw and turned face when the team attacked Brutus Beefcake. In the storyline, Hart, conscious of Beefcake's extensive facial injuries from a real-life parasailing accident three years prior, which required extensive reconstructive surgery to Beefcake's face and all but ended his full-time career, felt that his team went too far and tried to stop them. Hart even went so far as to cover an unconscious Beefcake with his own body to stop them from doing more harm,. Beefcake's long-time friend Hulk Hogan came out the following week and expressed gratitude to Hart for his uncharacteristically heroic actions, declaring Hart to now be his manager. He managed both Beefcake and Hogan, who at WrestleMania IX lost to Money Inc by disqualification. Later in the show, Hart for the first time would be the manager of the WWF World Heavyweight Champion when Hogan accepted an impromptu challenge by Mr. Fuji, the manager of the new champion Yokozuna, who had just defeated Bret Hart for the belt. Hogan would defeat the 505 lb (229 kg) new champion in a short match. At King of the Ring, Hart was in Hogan's corner as he lost the WWF World Heavyweight Title back to Yokozuna. This appearance was Hart's last in the WWF, as he, Beefcake, and Hogan all departed the company.

=== World Championship Wrestling (1994–2001) ===
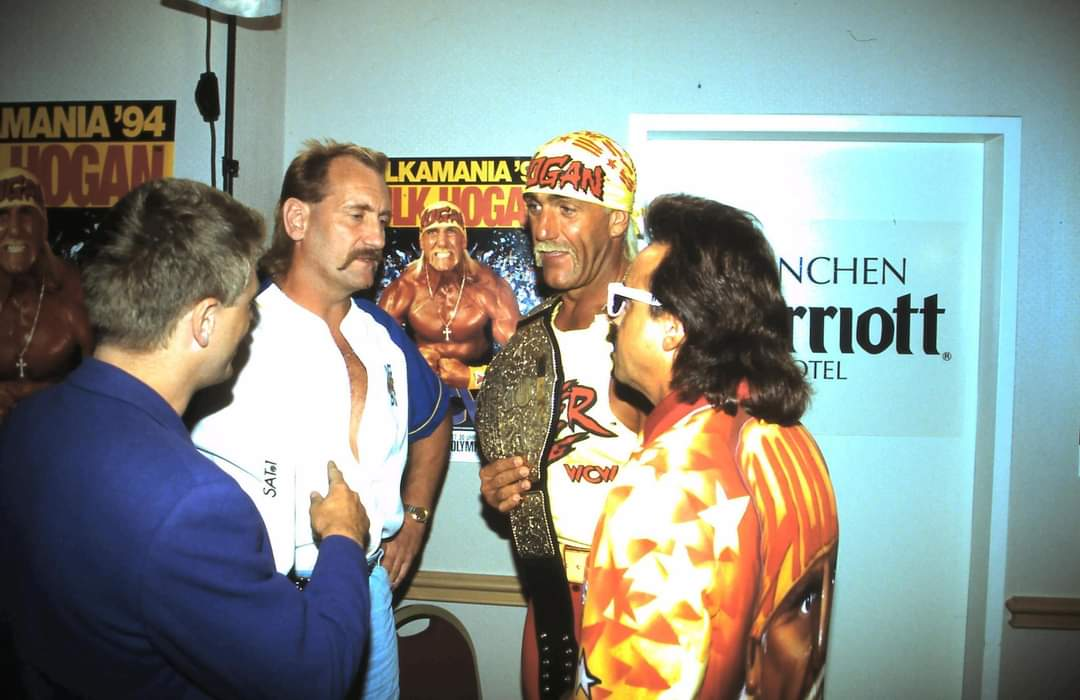
Hart with Hulk Hogan in 1994

After they departed from the WWF, Hogan and Hart briefly toured Mexico. After their return, Hart wrote music and occasionally appeared on Hogan's television show, Thunder in Paradise. Hogan then had Hart manage him when they went to World Championship Wrestling (WCW). At Bash at the Beach in 1994, Hart managed Hogan to win his first WCW World Heavyweight Championship by defeating "Nature Boy" Ric Flair.

At Halloween Havoc in 1995, Hart turned on Hogan to help The Giant. Hart also became the manager of the evil faction, the Dungeon of Doom, created by Kevin Sullivan. During that era, he managed Ric Flair to a 12th world title victory over Macho Man Randy Savage at Starrcade '95: World Cup of Wrestling. After the demise of the Dungeon of Doom in July 1997, Hart was written off television for a few months, and then Hart returned in November 1997 to manage the Faces of Fear and Hugh Morris, but the Dungeon of Doom name was not used. In 1998, Hart recreated First Family. After the demise of the First Family, Hart was placed in charge of booking TBS's WCW Saturday Night show prior to the program's cancellation. Hart wrestled on April 18, 1999, defeating Bubba the Love Sponge by disqualification at a house show. On November 15, he wrestled on WCW Monday Nitro, losing to Norman Smiley in a Hardcore match. At Spring Stampede 2000, Hart faced radio personality Mancow Muller. The two had a rematch later in the year at Mayhem 2000. In February 2001, Hart joined WCW's booking committee.

=== Independent circuit; Wrestlicious (2002–present) ===
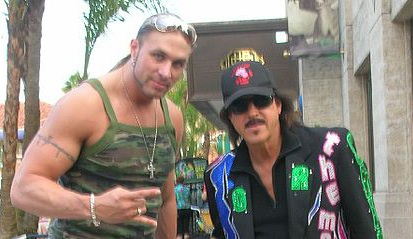
Hart posing with Lance Hoyt

After the sale of WCW to the then rival WWF, Hart and a close consortium of wrestlers and investors decided to create a wrestling organization called the Xcitement Wrestling Federation (XWF), which would replace WCW as well as take wrestling back to the early 1990s style of fun, family-oriented entertainment with minimal story lines and more solid wrestling. In 2002, Hart restarted his feud with Jerry Lawler by buying, for the XWF, part of the upstart Memphis Wrestling promotion. Hart would wrestle for Memphis Wrestling from 2003 to 2005. He lost to Jimmy Valiant in a Loser Eats Dog Food match on August 2, 2003. In 2007, Hart appeared at the PMG Clash of Legends. On November 7, 2008, Hart appeared at the Jerry "The King" Lawler 35th anniversary event. He also made a few appearances with Florida Championship Wrestling, WWE's developmental territory, as a color commentator in 2008. He made multiple appearances for WrestleMania Axxess during the week leading up to The 25th Anniversary of WrestleMania.

In May 2006, Hart traveled to The Funking Conservatory, owned by Dory Funk Jr and Marti Funk, to shoot promos with the students. His most notable ones were with Studio Sar Ah, in which he discusses his move from World Wrestling Entertainment to TNA Wrestling, as well as Wrestlicious. Both promos can be found on the Studio Sar Ah fan page on Facebook and as well as YouTube. Hart continues to work at the school and shoot promos. On January 19, 2010, Hart announced that his all-female wrestling promotion Wrestlicious would be premiering on MavTV and BiteTV on March 1, 2010. He wrestled at Pro Wrestling Guerrilla's Kurt RussellReunion II: The Reunioning in a battle royale won by Roddy Piper. On January 12, 2012, he wrestled at PWS WrestleReunion VI in a battle royale won by The Godfather. Hart currently appears at various professional wrestling conventions and autograph signings around the United States. He has appeared at many of the WrestleReunion shows, and also does various appearances as part of the VOC Nation wrestling radio program in Philadelphia on 1360 WNJC. Hart is a regular guest on the VOC Wrestling Nation radio program on WNJC.

=== Total Nonstop Action Wrestling (2003–2011) ===
In October 2003 Hart made his debut for Total Nonstop Action Wrestling (TNA), hyping a match between Hulk Hogan and Jeff Jarrett, which was eventually scrapped as Hogan decided to return to WWE instead. On June 19, 2005, at Slammiversary pay-per-view, The Naturals were assisted in a title defense against Team Canada by Hart, who ran to ringside and threw his megaphone to Chase Stevens, who hit Petey Williams with it and pinned him. Hart acted as the manager of The Naturals until October 3, 2005. On February 14, 2010, at Against All Odds, Hart made his return to TNA as a heel by helping The Nasty Boys defeat Team 3D in a tag team match. The alliance, however, was short-lived, as on March 29, 2010, news broke that the Nasty Boys had been released by TNA following an incident at a TNA function with Spike executives present. Hart stayed with the company following the incident, but his role was unknown. Hart was seen on the January 20, 2011, edition of Impact!, when Kurt Angle yelled at him to play his entrance music upon entering the Impact! Zone.

=== Return to WWE (2011–present) ===
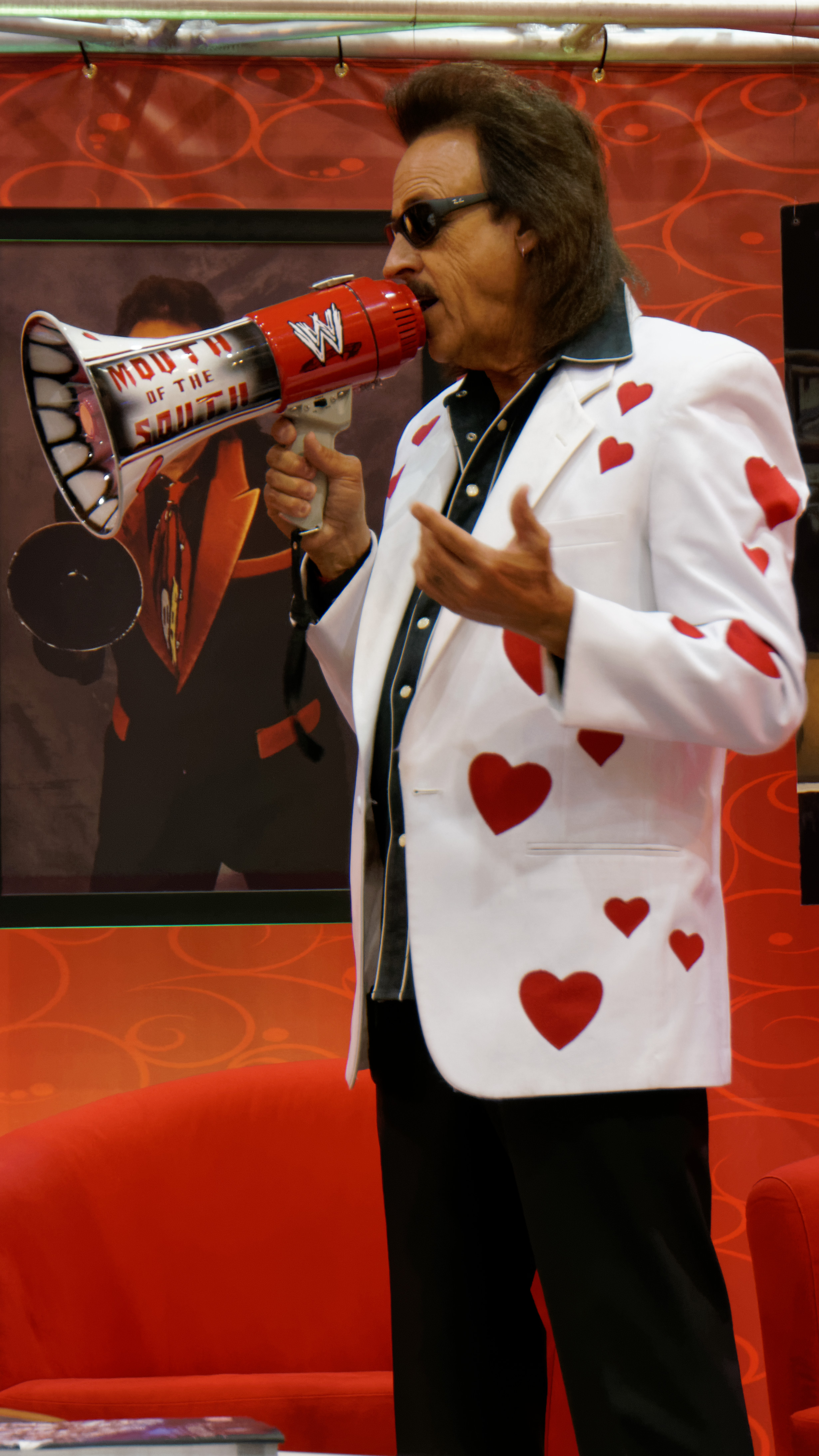
Hart with his signature megaphone in April 2014

On March 1, 2011, it was announced that Jimmy Hart had left Total Nonstop Action Wrestling and re-signed with WWE to work on WrestleMania-related projects. Since then he has hosted various house shows. On August 14, 2011, Hart made an appearance at SummerSlam, teasing a managerial position with R-Truth during a backstage segment. On April 10, 2012, Hart made an appearance on SmackDown: Blast from the Past, where he managed the team of Heath Slater and Tyson Kidd, but ended up getting the mandible claw from Mick Foley.

As of April 30, 2014, Hart was part-owner of "Hogan's Beach", a wrestling-themed tiki-bar in Tampa, Florida. As of April 2014, Hart was a regular cast member on the WWE Network original reality show Legends' House. In April 2017, Hart purchased a beachfront property in Daytona Beach, Florida and opened "Jimmy Hart's Hall of Fame Bar and Tiki Deck", a beach-themed bar.

On January 4, 2021, he made an appearance on the RAW Legends Night, where he was involved in a segment with Hulk Hogan, Drew McIntyre, and Sheamus. On January 23, 2023, Hart appeared on WWE Raw is XXX, the 30th anniversary edition of Monday Night Raw, accompanying Hulk Hogan to open the show. On January 6, 2025, Hart once again accompanied Hogan during the Raw debut on Netflix. On May 24, 2025, he was shown alongside Bushwhacker Luke in the crowd during Saturday Night's Main Event XXXIX.

On July 25, 2025, Hart made an appearance on SmackDown during the tribute to Hogan, to whom he remained a very close friend even in his final days. He was also in attendance at the first ever Real American Freestyle event which was held on August 30, 2025. Since Hulk Hogan's death, Hart has also continued to make stops to promote Hogan's Real American Beer brand products, including at the 7 Cuz Beer Store in Lebanon, Pennsylvania and Glenn Miller Beer & Soda in Lemoyne, Pennsylvania on December 15, 2025. In January 2026, Family Brand Tradition referred to Hart as Real American Beer's "ambassador." In April 2026, Hart would induct Hogan's match with Andre the Giant at Wrestlemania III into the WWE Hall of Fame's class of 2026.

== Other media ==
His book, The Mouth of the South, was released on November 18, 2004.

=== Music ===
During his years in the professional wrestling business, Hart composed many theme songs for wrestlers in the WWF and WCW. Some of the wrestlers for whom he composed music were Honky Tonk Man, Jimmy Snuka, Brutus Beefcake, The Rockers, The Hart Foundation, Crush, the Fabulous Rougeau Brothers, Dusty Rhodes, the Legion of Doom, the Nasty Boys, Ted DiBiase, the Mountie, Hulk Hogan, Sting, the nWo Wolfpac, 3 Count and Big Boss Man. He also composed the themes for SummerSlam '88 (which was later reused as the theme for many early Royal Rumble events) and WrestleMania VI (which was later used for the seventh, eighth, ninth, and tenth events).

In the late 1980s, Hart released a music album titled Outrageous Conduct. The release consisted of comical songs done in character, such as "Barbra Streisand's Nose" and "Eat Your Heart Out Rick Springfield" (the latter of which would become Hart's solo theme song in WWE). In 1995, Hulk Hogan released the album "Hulk Rules, on Select Records." Hart, as well as Hogan's wife, were a part of the band The Wrestling Boot Band and helped write and sing many of the album's songs.

=== Film and television appearances ===
In 1989 Hart appeared in the Andy Kaufman comedy documentary film I'm from Hollywood. He made a cameo appearance in the season 6 Baywatch episode "Bash at the Beach."

In September 2007, Hart appeared on an episode of The People's Court as a witness for a defendant. Hart is a close friend of Hulk Hogan and is featured on many episodes of Hogan's VH1 reality series, Hogan Knows Best. Hart was also a judge on Hulk Hogan's Celebrity Championship Wrestling. Hart also appears in hair restoration advertisements for Medical Hair Restoration, as a client. He also does a comedic women's wrestling show called Wrestlicious, which can be viewed at Wrestlicious.com. Hart appeared on the WWE Legends' House. Hart has appeared a few times in Hulk Hogan's TV show Thunder in Paradise. He also sang the intro music for the episode "Deadly Lessons, Pt. 1".

Hart played Big Winner in the 2010 revisionist Western comedy film Big Money Rustlas. He played himself in the 2011 comedy horror film Monster Brawl. Hart has also played smaller roles such as the Circus Web Setter in Larger Than Life and Randy in the 2007 film The Bros.

=== Video games ===
Hart made his video game debut in the 1987 game MicroLeague Wrestling as a manager. He also appears as a manager in WWE 2k15, WWE 2k16, WWE 2k24 (as DLC), WWE 2k25 and WWE 2k26. He appears as a playable character in WCW Nitro, WCW/nWo Thunder, WCW Mayhem, WCW Backstage Assault, Legends of Wrestling, Legends of Wrestling 2, and WWE SmackDown! vs. Raw 2006. He was also added to the mobile game WWE SuperCard.

== Discography ==
Album:

- Outrageous Conduct (1985)

Single:

- Eat your Heart out Rick Springfield (1983)

== Championships and accomplishments ==
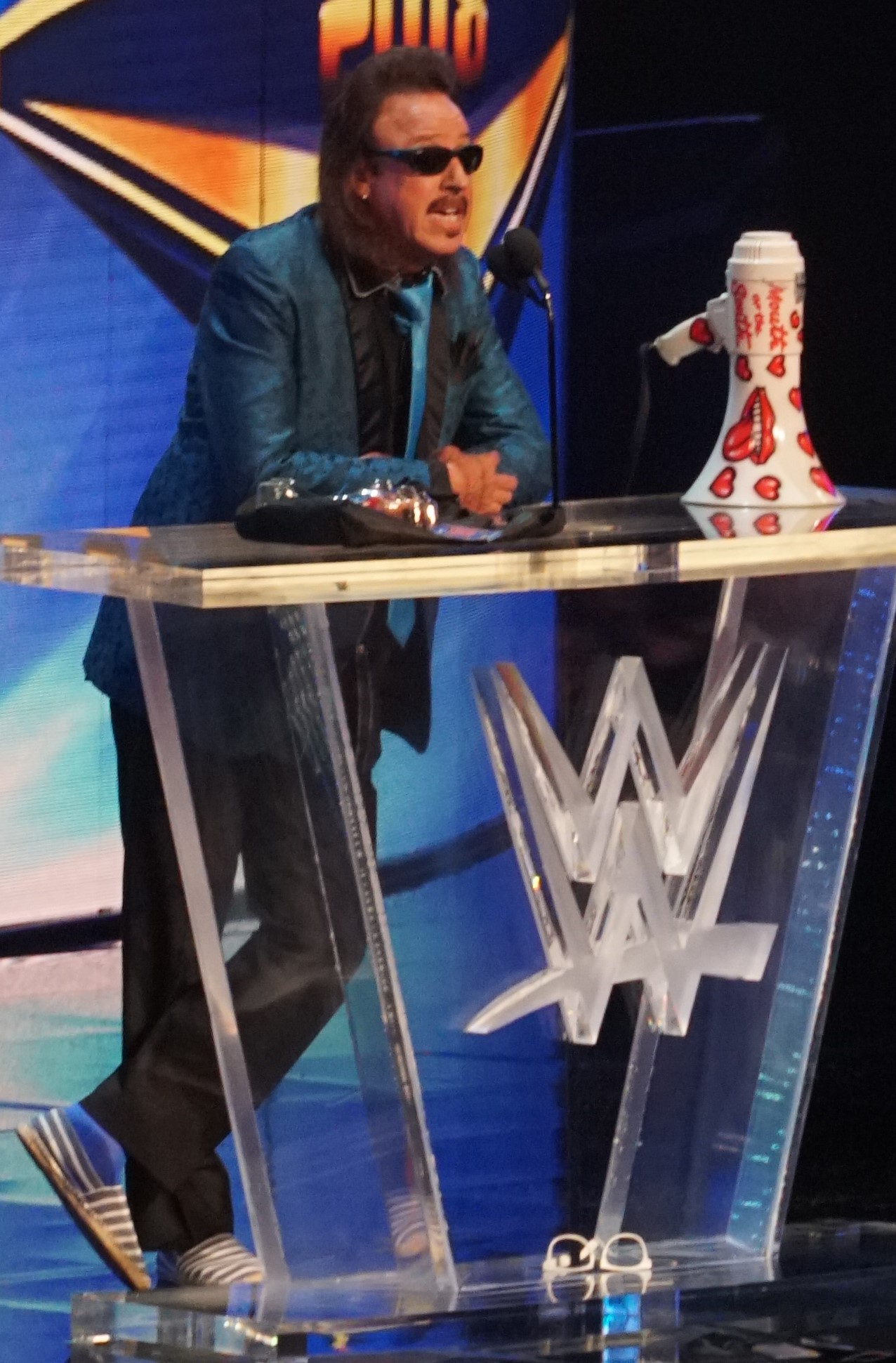
Hart at the WWE Hall of Fame induction ceremony at the Smoothie King Center in New Orleans, April 2018

- American Wrestling Association
  - AWA Southern Heavyweight Championship (1 time)
- Cauliflower Alley Club
  - Manager's Award (2015)
  - The Mick Foley Philanthropy Award (2026)
- Memphis Wrestling Hall of Fame
  - Class of 2017
- Memphis Music Hall of Fame
  - Class of 2024 (as a member of the Gentrys)
- Pro Wrestling Illustrated
  - Manager of the Year (1987, 1994)
- World Wrestling Entertainment
  - WWE Hall of Fame (Class of 2005)
- Wrestling Observer Newsletter
  - Manager of the Year (1983)
  - Best on Interviews (1984)
  - Wrestling Observer Newsletter Hall of Fame (Class of 2018)
