= The Gentrys =

American band

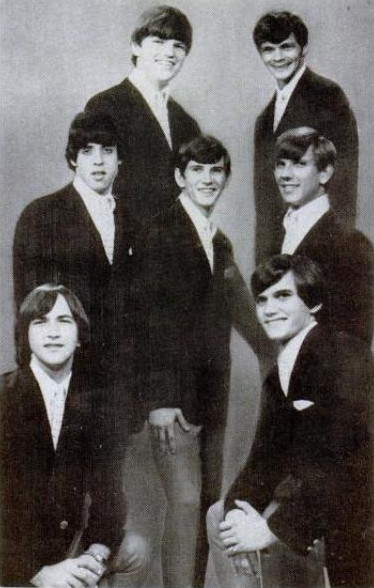
- The Gentrys, 1965

Background information
- Origin: Memphis, Tennessee, United States
- Genre: Rock
- Years active: 1963–1966; 1969–1972
- Label: MGM Records
- Past members: Jimmy Hart, Bruce Bowles, Larry Raspberry, Bobby Fisher, Pat Neal, Larry Wall, Rob Straube Jimmy Johnson, Larry Butler

The Gentrys were an American band of the 1960s and early 1970s, best known for their 1965 hit "Keep On Dancing". A cover by the Bay City Rollers charted No. 9 in the UK in 1971. Follow-up singles charted outside of the Top 40: "Every Day I Have to Cry" (1966), "Spread It on Thick" (1966), "Cinnamon Girl" (1970), "Why Should I Cry" (1970), "Wild World" (1971), and a 'Bubbling Under' Billboard chart entry, "Brown Paper Sack" (#101, 1966).

== Career ==
The seven-member group of Treadwell High School (Memphis, Tennessee) alumni included Bruce Bowles (vocals), Bobby Fisher (saxophone, keyboards), Jimmy Hart (vocals), Jimmy Johnson (trumpet), Pat Neal (bass guitar), Larry Raspberry (guitar, lead vocalist), and drummer Larry Wall (replaced by Rob Straube; Wall later became a salesman for the CBS label) and also with another member, Larry Butler (keyboards). The youths formed the Gentrys in May 1963 as a rock 'n' roll group for local dances, and were very successful playing for high school dates. In September 1964 they won third place in the Mid-South Fair Talent Competition and auditioned for the Ted Mack Amateur Hour. They soon became the most popular teenage band in the mid-South and in 1964 won the Memphis Battle of the Bands. In December 1964 the group was given a contract by local record label Youngstown Records, and made their first record of "Sometimes", which was very popular locally in early 1965.

After bubbling under the Billboard chart for a week, the Gentrys scored with the million-selling "Keep On Dancing" which reached No. 4 on the Billboard Hot 100 in 1965. Success led to appearances on Hullabaloo, Shindig!, and Where the Action Is, and they toured with The Beach Boys and Sonny and Cher, as well as playing on Dick Clark bills. However, five follow-up singles failed to break into the Top 40; several months after appearing in the 1967 movie It's a Bikini World, the group disbanded. Other notable band members during the 1963–1966 years were Claude Wayne Whitehead (rhythm guitar), Ronnie Moore (bass), Sonny Pitman (bass), and engineer/producer Terry Manning (keyboards).

"Keep On Dancing" is notable for being a song played twice, to stretch the record out to the length of the typical pop single of its day. The second half of the song, after the false fade, beginning with Wall's drum fill, is the same as the first. Though the group had Hart and Bowles as singers, their biggest hit was sung by their guitarist, Larry Raspberry.

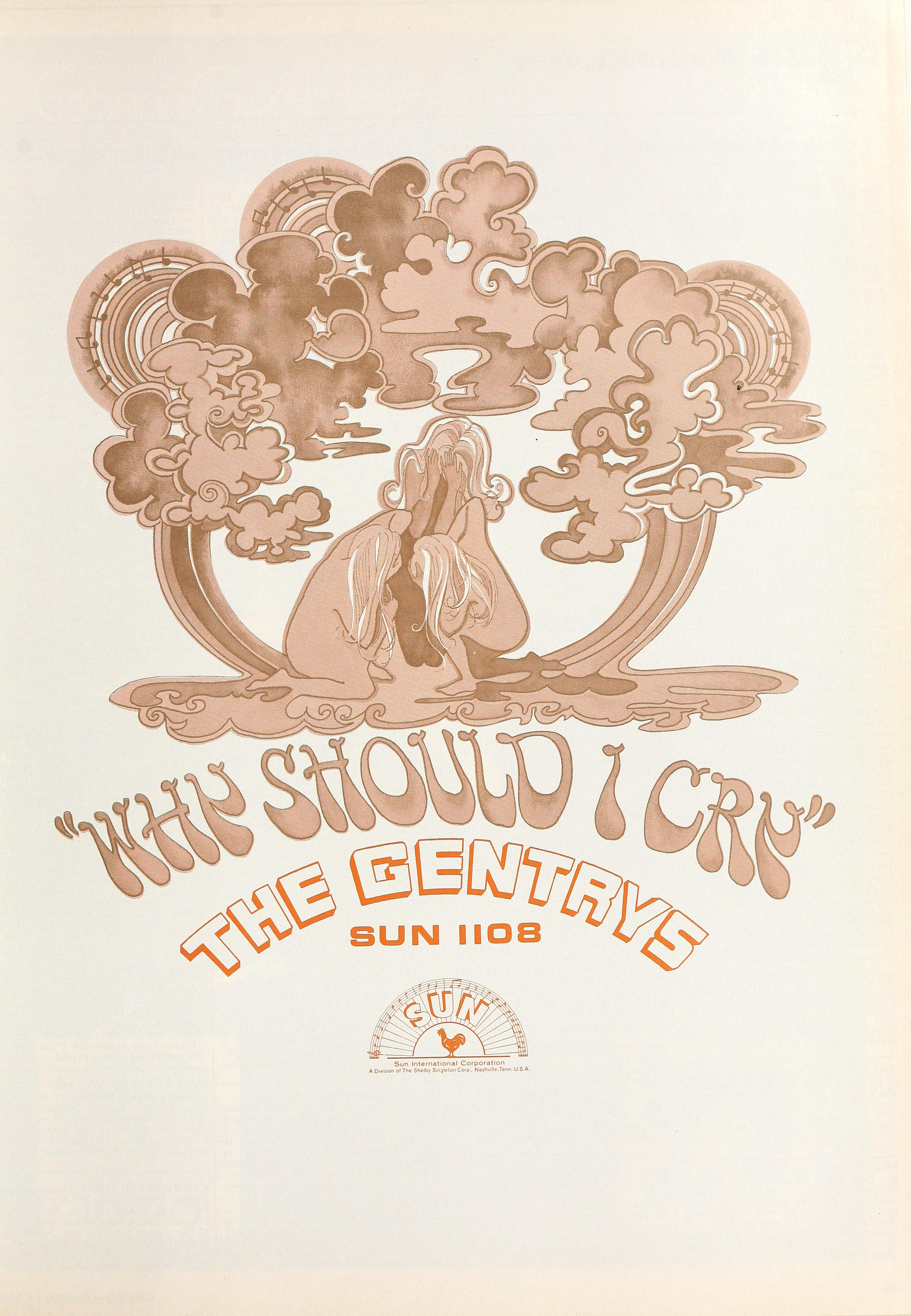
Cashbox advertisement, February 14, 1970

Original member Hart reformed The Gentrys in 1969, with himself as lead singer; they recorded initially for the Bell Records label. The 1969–1971 Gentrys included Hart, Steve Spear (bass), David Beaver (keyboards), Jimmy Tarbutton (guitar), and Mike Gardner (drums). In 1970 they recorded an album on Sam Phillips's Sun label and put two singles into the Billboard Hot 100: "Why Should I Cry" (which peaked at No. 61 on 7 March 1970) and "Cinnamon Girl", charting before Neil Young's version and peaking at No. 52 on June 13, 1970.

The 1971 through 1972 line-up of The Gentrys included Hart on vocals, along with Wesley Stafford on lead guitar and vocals, Alan Heidelberg (drums) and Bobby Liles (bass). Marty Lacker (a member of Elvis Presley's "Memphis Mafia") helped to land this version of The Gentrys a recording contract with Capitol Records. It produced a single written by Hart and Stafford entitled "Let Me Put This Ring Upon Your Finger." Knox Phillips was the record producer for all recording endeavors of this period. The Gentrys disbanded again after that.

Hart subsequently found greater fame and success in professional wrestling, as a manager nicknamed "The Mouth of the South." During this time, he also composed entrance music for wrestlers, as well as appearing as a member of The Wrestling Boot Band, a group fronted by Hulk Hogan. The story of the Gentrys is described in the book The Mouth of the South by Jimmy Hart, Hulk Hogan, Bret Hart, and Jerry Lawler.

Raspberry went on to play with Alamo, who released a self-titled LP in 1971, and subsequently formed Larry Raspberry and the Highsteppers, releasing two albums in the mid-1970s. The band is still active. On a few occasions, Raspberry and other Gentry members reunite. Raspberry and his brother James also starred in the 1982 film I Was a Zombie for the F.B.I., directed by Marius Penczner and filmed by students from Memphis State University. The film aired nationally on USA Network's eclectic variety series Night Flight in 1985.

A contemporary lineup under the Gentrys name is a gospel family quartet of no relation to the original band.

In July 2026, Sun Records announced that they had discovered unreleased songs, that would be released on an album in September, titled It's Been So Long.

== Discography ==
Singles

- 1965: "Sometimes" (Youngstown)
- 1965: "Keep On Dancing" (Youngstown)
- 1965: "Spread It On Thick" (MGM)
- 1966: "Everyday I Have to Cry" (MGM)
- 1966: "A Woman of the World" (MGM)
- 1967: "You Make Me Feel So Good" (MGM)
- 1967: "I Can See" (MGM)
- 1968: "I Can't Go Back to Denver" (Bell)
- 1968: "Thinking Like a Child" (Bell)
- 1968: "Midnight Train" (Bell)
- 1969: "Why Should I Cry" (Sun)
- 1970: "Cinnamon Girl" (Sun)
- 1970: "He'll Never Love You" (Sun)
- 1970: "Goddess of Love" (Sun)
- 1971: "Wild World" (Sun)
- 1971: "God Save Our Country" (Sun)
- 1972: "Let Me Put This Ring Upon Your Finger" (Capitol)
- 1974: "Little Gold Band" (Stax)
- 1975: "High Flyer" (Stax)

Albums

- 1965: Keep on Dancing (MGM)
- 1966: Gentry Time (MGM)
- 1970: The Gentrys (Sun)
- 2026: It's Been So Long (Sun)
