= Halloween Havoc (1999) =

World Championship Wrestling pay-per-view event

- VHS cover featuring Sid Vicious, Sting and Goldberg
- Promotion: World Championship Wrestling
- Date: October 24, 1999
- City: Paradise, Nevada
- Venue: MGM Grand Garden Arena
- Attendance: 8,464
- Buy rate: 230,000
- Tagline(s): The Stuff Nightmares Are Made Of... When Our Inner Animals Come Out To Play.

Pay-per-view chronology
← Previous; Fall Brawl	Next → Mayhem

Halloween Havoc chronology
← Previous; 1998	Next → 2000

The 1999 Halloween Havoc was the 11th annual Halloween Havoc professional wrestling pay-per-view (PPV) event produced by World Championship Wrestling (WCW). It took place on October 24, 1999, from the MGM Grand Garden Arena in Paradise, Nevada.

== Production ==
=== Background ===
Halloween Havoc was an annual professional wrestling pay-per-view event produced by World Championship Wrestling (WCW) since 1989. As the name implies, it was a Halloween-themed show held in October. The 1999 event was the 11th event in the Halloween Havoc chronology and it took place on October 24, 1999, from the MGM Grand Garden Arena in Las Vegas, Nevada.

=== Storylines ===
The event featured professional wrestling matches that involve different wrestlers from pre-existing scripted feuds and storylines. Professional wrestlers portray villains, heroes, or less distinguishable characters in the scripted events that build tension and culminate in a wrestling match or series of matches.

== Event ==
Other on-screen personnel
Role:	Name:
Commentators	Tony Schiavone
Commentators	Bobby Heenan
Interviewers	Gene Okerlund
Interviewers	Mike Tenay
Ring announcers	Michael Buffer
Ring announcers	David Penzer
Referees	Mickie Jay
Referees	Mark Johnson
Referees	Nick Patrick
Referees	Charles Robinson
Referees	Billy Silverman

The opening match saw Disco Inferno retain the WCW Cruiserweight Championship in a match against Lash LeRoux. Inferno was able to hit an inverted atomic drop followed by the Last Dance, to pick up the victory via pinfall.

The second match was a Street Fight for the vacant WCW World Tag Team Championship between Harlem Heat (Booker T and Stevie Ray), The Filthy Animals (Billy Kidman and Konnan), and The First Family (Brian Knobbs and Hugh Morrus). After Harlem Heat and The First Family took the fight to the back of the arena, Booker T pinned Knobbs. While the referee that followed them led them back to the ring to make the official decision, Kidman pinned Morrus. The two referees conferred and it was ultimately decided that, since Harlem Heat got the pin first, they would be awarded the victory and thus crowned the new tag team champions.

The next match saw Eddie Guerrero defeat Perry Saturn by disqualification. Saturn was disqualified after Ric Flair came out and hit Guerrero with a crowbar. Kidman, along with Torrie Wilson, came out to make the save, but Flair kissed Wilson who appeared to enjoy it after some initial shock.

The following match saw Brad Armstrong defeating Berlyn. Next, Rick Steiner won the WCW World Television Championship with a victory over Chris Benoit after Dean Malenko attacked Benoit with a chair. Following this, Lex Luger picked up a submission victory over Bret Hart after applying a half crab.

The following match was supposed to be Sting and Hulk Hogan for the WCW World Heavyweight Championship. Hogan's music played, but he never entered. Eventually, Sting's music played and he made his way to the ring. Following this, Hogan's music played again and he entered wearing street clothing. Upon entering the ring, Hogan whispered in Sting's ear and then laid down. Sting covered Hogan and the match ended with the opening bell never having rung.

The next match was for the WCW United States Heavyweight Championship. On his way to the ring, the challenger, Goldberg was attacked by Scott Hall and Kevin Nash. Despite this, Goldberg was still able to capture the championship from Sid Vicious. With Vicious covered in blood and unable to answer referee Mickie Henson's count, the referee was forced to stop the match and award the victory and the title to Goldberg.

The second to last match was a strap match between Diamond Dallas Page and Ric Flair. Page was able to gain the victory, with the strap wrapped around Flair's neck.

The final match of the night was a "champion vs. champion" match between WCW World Heavyweight Champion Sting and WCW United States Heavyweight Champion Goldberg. Although the announcers stated that this match was a non-title match, following the match, Goldberg was announced as the new WCW World Heavyweight Champion. Afterwards, Sting argued with referee Charles Robinson before hitting him with the Scorpion Death Drop.

== Reception ==
In 2017, Kevin Pantoja of 411Mania gave the event a rating of 1.5 [Extremely Horrendous], stating, "There is almost nothing redeemable about this event. It truly sucks. Russo’s crash TV style was all over this, but even without those strange moments, the wrestling wasn’t any good. Sid/Goldberg was the match of the night, so you know there’s a problem. There were things like the stupid Sting/Hogan trash and the confusing main event. Guys like Eddie Guerrero phoned it in, while someone like Chris Benoit was dragged down by the horrible Rick Steiner. Tons of nonsense throughout a show filled with lame matches."

== Aftermath ==
The following night on Nitro, Sting declared that he had never agreed to defend the title and called J. J. Dillon to the ring to explain. Dillon announced the title was being vacated due to Sting's attack on referee Charles Robinson during the unsanctioned match and announced a tournament for the vacant title to conclude at the following month's Mayhem pay-per-view event. Later that night, Goldberg defended his WCW United States Heavyweight Championship against and lost to Bret Hart, after Kevin Nash, Scott Hall and Sid Vicious attacked and cost Goldberg the match.

== Results ==
No.	Results	Stipulations	Times
1	Disco Inferno (c) defeated Lash LeRoux	Singles match for the WCW Cruiserweight Championship	07:35
2	Harlem Heat (Booker T and Stevie Ray) defeated The Filthy Animals (Billy Kidman and Konnan) and The First Family (Brian Knobbs and Hugh Morrus) (with Jimmy Hart)	Street Fight for the vacant WCW World Tag Team Championship	05:02
3	Eddie Guerrero defeated Perry Saturn by disqualification	Singles match	11:12
4	Brad Armstrong defeated Berlyn (with The Wall)	Singles match	04:23
5	Rick Steiner defeated Chris Benoit (c)	Singles match for the WCW World Television Championship	12:50
6	The Total Package (with Elizabeth) defeated Bret Hart	Singles match	07:46
7	Sting (c) defeated Hulk Hogan	Singles match for the WCW World Heavyweight Championship	00:03
8	Goldberg defeated Sid Vicious (c) by Technical Knockout	Singles match for the WCW United States Heavyweight Championship	07:11
9	Diamond Dallas Page (with Kimberly Page) defeated Ric Flair	Strap match	12:49
10	Goldberg defeated Sting	Singles match	03:08
(c) / – the champion(s) heading into the match
