= Keep On Dancing (The Gentrys song) =

- Side A of US single (MGM)

Single by The Gentrys

from the album Keep On Dancing
- B-side: "Make Up Your Mind"
- Released: June 1965 (U.S.)
- Recorded: 1965
- Genre: Garage rock
- Length: 2:08
- Label: Youngstown; Y-601
- Songwriter(s): Allen A. Jones, Andrew Love, Richard Shann

The Gentrys singles chronology
"Sometimes" (1964)	"Keep On Dancing" (1965)	"Little Drops of Water" (1965)

"Keep On Dancing" is a rock song written by Allen A. Jones, Andrew Love and Richard Shann, originally recorded by the U.S. R&B group, The Avantis (not to be confused with the surf rock band with the same name) on Argo Records in 1963.

== The Gentrys cover ==
In 1965, the song was covered by The Gentrys. The Gentrys' version was first released on Youngstown 601 in 1965, but was soon nationally distributed by MGM Records. "Keep On Dancing" is notable for the fact that it is actually one short recording repeated in order to stretch the record out to the length of the typical pop single of its day. The second part of the song (after the false fade, beginning with Gentrys drummer Larry Wall's drum fill) is the same as the first. Although the Gentrys usually had Jimmy Hart and Bruce Bowles as singers, the band's guitarist, Larry Raspberry, sang lead vocals on the song.

== Chart performance and sales ==
"Keep On Dancing" reached No. 4 in 1965 on the Billboard Hot 100 chart on October 30. It reached No. 5 on Cashbox for two weeks. It stayed on the Hot 100 for 13 weeks and Cashbox for 14 weeks. It surpassed a million copies in sales after leaving the charts.

Chart (1965)	Peak position
US Billboard Hot 100	4
US Cashbox Top 100	5

== Other cover versions ==
- In 1971, the Bay City Rollers covered the song as their debut single and their version charted at No. 9 in the UK.
- Pink Lady recorded a Japanese-language version of the song on their 1977 debut album Pepper Keibu.

== See also ==
- List of 1960s one-hit wonders in the United States
