= WCW Mayhem =

Mayhem
- Promotions: World Championship Wrestling
- First event: Mayhem (1999)
- Last event: Mayhem (2000)

Mayhem was a professional wrestling pay-per-view (PPV) event produced by World Championship Wrestling (WCW) in the month of November in 1999 and 2000. It replaced the promotion's November PPV event World War 3 which was held from 1995 to 1998 and is noted for being the first wrestling pay-per-view named after a video game, rather than the video game named after a pay-per-view.

Since 2001, the rights to the event are owned by WWE. In 2015, all WCW pay-per-views were made available on the WWE Network.

== Dates, venues, and main events ==
Event	Date	City	Venue	Main event(s)
Mayhem (1999)	November 21, 1999	Toronto, Ontario	Air Canada Centre	Bret Hart vs. Chris Benoit in a tournament final for the vacant WCW World Heavyweight Championship
Mayhem (2000)	November 26, 2000	Milwaukee, Wisconsin	U.S. Cellular Arena	Booker T (c) vs. Scott Steiner in a Straitjacket steel cage match for the WCW World Heavyweight Championship
(c) – refers to the champion(s) heading into the match
