= Mayhem (1999) =

1999 World Championship Wrestling pay-per-view event

- Promotional poster featuring Diamond Dallas Page, Sting, Hulk Hogan and Goldberg
- Promotion: World Championship Wrestling
- Date: November 21, 1999
- City: Toronto, Ontario, Canada
- Venue: Air Canada Centre
- Attendance: 13,839
- Buy rate: 200,000
- Tagline: The Night Of Champions

Pay-per-view chronology
← Previous; Halloween Havoc	Next → Starrcade

Mayhem chronology
← Previous; First	Next → 2000

The 1999 Mayhem was the inaugural Mayhem professional wrestling pay-per-view (PPV) event produced by World Championship Wrestling (WCW), presented by Electronic Arts (in which the event was named after the EA-published video game of the same name). The event took place on November 21, 1999 from the Air Canada Centre in Toronto, Ontario, Canada.

Twelve matches were contested at the event, with the most notable feature being a thirty-two man tournament for the vacated WCW World Heavyweight Championship. The title had been vacated after previous champion Sting attacked a referee at Halloween Havoc and Goldberg defeated Sting for the title in an unsanctioned match. The first three rounds of the tournament took place on WCW television and the semi-final and final matches of the tournament were contested at Mayhem, where Chris Benoit defeated Jeff Jarrett and Bret Hart defeated Sting in the semi-final rounds. Hart defeated Benoit in the main event to win the final round and win the vacant title.

Other featured matches on the card were Goldberg versus Sid Vicious in an "I Quit" match, Scott Hall versus Booker T for the WCW United States and World Television Championships and Filthy Animals versus The Revolution in an elimination match.

== Storylines ==
The card featured professional wrestling matches that resulted from scripted storylines and had results predetermined by WCW played out on WCW's television programs Monday Nitro, Thunder, Saturday Night and WorldWide.

At Halloween Havoc, Sting defeated Hulk Hogan to retain the World Heavyweight Championship after Hogan purposely laid down for Sting. Later in the night, Sting issued an open challenge to an opponent for a true wrestling fight and the challenge was answered by Goldberg, (who had earlier defeated Sid Vicious for the United States Heavyweight Championship) who defeated Sting in the unsanctioned match to win the title. After the match, Sting attacked the referee Charles Robinson with a Scorpion Death Drop. The following night, on Monday Nitro, Sting complained to J. J. Dillon that he never put the title on the line in the match but Goldberg had been awarded the title and then Dillon stripped Goldberg of the title and vacated it due to Sting's attack on Robinson and set up a thirty-two man tournament for the vacant title with the semi-finals and finals taking place at Mayhem. Bret Hart defeated Goldberg in the first round to win Goldberg's United States Heavyweight Championship due to outside interference by Sid Vicious and The Outsiders, behind the referee Mickie Jay's back. On the November 8 Nitro, Scott Hall defeated Hart, Goldberg and Sid Vicious in a fatal four-way ladder match to win the United States Heavyweight Championship.

On the November 11 episode of Thunder, Disco Inferno provided guest commentary during Evan Karagias' match against Lash LeRoux and began flirting with Karagias' valet Madusa at ringside which caused distraction for Karagias to lose the match. After the match, Inferno challenged Karagias to a match and offered to put his Cruiserweight Championship on the line and Karagias accepted the challenge on Madusa's urging.

On the October 25 episode of Nitro, "The Powers That Be" gave an ultimatum to Curt Hennig which required that if he lost any other match by pinfall then he would be forced to retire. Hennig would avoid by winning his matches or losing via count-out. On the November 15 episode of Nitro, Hennig took on Goldberg in a match which stipulated that if Hennig would be pinned then he would retire and if he won then he would receive a new contract. Hennig lost via submission, meaning he would not have to retire. On the November 18 episode of Thunder, Hennig cost Buff Bagwell, a match against Chris Benoit, setting up a match between Bagwell and Hennig at Mayhem.

On the November 1 episode of Nitro, Vampiro defeated Berlyn in the opening round of the tournament for the vacant WCW World Heavyweight Championship after interference by Misfits. The following week on Nitro, Berlyn cost Vampiro, the second round match in the tournament against Buff Bagwell by hitting Vampiro with a chain. Vampiro attacked Berlyn during a match against Curly Bill on the November 11 Thunder. On the November 15 Nitro, Berlyn and The Wall defeated Vampiro and Misfits in a handicap match to set up a match between Berlyn and Vampiro at Mayhem.

At Halloween Havoc, Diamond Dallas Page defeated Ric Flair in a strap match and continued to attack Flair after the match until Flair's son David Flair came to his father's rescue but Kimberly Page attacked David low with her knee and then Page delivered a Cutter to David. Filthy Animals attacked Ric and David and then kidnapped Ric away. The following night on Nitro, David and DDP competed in the first round tournament match for the WCW World Heavyweight Championship, which ended in a no contest after David whipped DDP with a crowbar. On November 1 Nitro, Flair attacked Filthy Animals with his crowbar and then Kimberly ran Flair down with a car. As a result, Flair began a feud with Kimberly and it was announced on the November 8 episode of Nitro that Flair would face Kimberly at Mayhem. On the November 15 Nitro, Flair interrupted a match between Kimberly and Asya and scared Kimberly off with his crowbar.

On the October 25 episode of Nitro, Norman Smiley defeated Bam Bam Bigelow in a hardcore match in the first round of the WCW World Heavyweight Championship tournament and developed a new character, considering himself the face of hardcore wrestling in WCW after defeating Meng and The Barbarian in a triple threat match on the November 1 Nitro. On November 8 episode of Nitro, Brian Knobbs of The First Family cost Smiley, a hardcore match against Billy Kidman in the second round of the World Heavyweight Championship tournament by hitting Smiley with a hockey stick. On November 11 episode of Thunder, Knobbs and Jimmy Hart took exception to Smiley's character and expressed their anger over him. Later that night, Smiley cost Knobbs, his match against The Maestro. On the November 15 Nitro, Smiley defeated Jimmy Hart in a hardcore match. Smiley then interfered in a match between First Family's Jerry Flynn and Bam Bam Bigelow on the November 18 Thunder, during which Flynn was distracted by Smiley fighting Barbarian and Knobbs and Bigelow capitalized by defeating Flynn. This led to a match between Smiley and Knobbs to determine the inaugural Hardcore Champion at Mayhem.

On the October 18 Nitro, Jeff Jarrett returned to WCW and smashed Buff Bagwell with his guitar. Later that night, Elizabeth was found unconscious backstage with a guitar beside her, causing The Total Package to suspect Jarrett of having done so. On the November 1 episode of Nitro, Jarrett called out Luger and Elizabeth and demanded Luger and Elizabeth to apologize to him for suspecting him of doing so and then they suspected Meng of having done so which caused Meng to come out and then Luger and Elizabeth attacked Meng. Meng cost Luger, his WCW World Heavyweight Championship tournament quarter-final match against Sting on November 15. On the November 18 episode of Thunder, Elizabeth apologized to Meng after his match with Vampiro to distract him enough for Luger to attack Meng with a chair, thus setting up a match between the two at Mayhem.

== Event ==
Other on-screen personnel
Role:	Name:
Commentator	Tony Schiavone
Commentator	Bobby Heenan
Interviewer	Gene Okerlund
Interviewer	Mike Tenay
Referee	Johnny Boone
Referee	Mark Johnson
Referee	Nick Patrick
Referee	Charles Robinson
Referee	Billy Silverman
Ring announcer	Michael Buffer
Ring announcer	David Penzer

=== Preliminary matches ===
Chris Benoit faced Jeff Jarrett in the semi-final round of a tournament for the vacant World Heavyweight Championship. After a back and forth action between the two, Creative Control interfered in the match on Jarrett's behalf after Benoit performed a diving headbutt on Jarrett. One of the Creative Control members distracted the referee, allowing the other member to attack Benoit and then Jarrett delivered a Stroke to Benoit and attempted a pinfall which was broken by Dustin Rhodes. Rhodes brawled with Creative Control and Benoit struck Jarrett with a guitar to advance to the final round.

Disco Inferno defended the Cruiserweight Championship against Evan Karagias. Inferno's manager Tony Marinara began flirting with Madusa at ringside and Karagias choked Marinara in anger. Inferno took advantage and attempted to nail Karagias with a chair but Karagias moved out of the way and Disco accidentally clocked Marinara with it. Karagias capitalized by performing a springboard crossbody to win the title.

Norman Smiley and Brian Knobbs competed in a Hardcore match for the inaugural Hardcore Championship. Smiley and Knobbs brawled with each other throughout the arena and then the action spilled into an elevator. Knobbs' manager Jimmy Hart tried to hit Smiley with a trashcan but the door of the elevator closed and both men continued to fight. Hart accidentally blasted Knobbs with the trashcan as the elevator re-opened and Smiley defeated Knobbs to win the title.

The Filthy Animals members Eddie Guerrero, Billy Kidman and Torrie Wilson took on The Revolution's Perry Saturn, Dean Malenko and Asya in an intergender elimination tag team match. A fan interfered in the match by jumping off the guardrail and attacked Malenko with the Canadian flag but was interjected. Torrie was hurt while brawling with Asya and then Guerrero pushed Kidman to check on Asya and Malenko rolled up Kidman to eliminate him. Guerrero was triple teamed by Revolution but he performed a hurricanrana to eliminate Malenko. Saturn accidentally performed a kick on Asya and Guerrero performed a frog splash on her to eliminate her. Saturn applied a Rings of Saturn to make Guerrero submit and thus eliminating him. Torrie was left alone with Saturn in the match and Shane Douglas distracted the referee, allowing Saturn to low blow Torrie for the win.

Curt Hennig took on Buff Bagwell in a match which stipulated that Hennig would be forced to retire if he lost. Jeff Jarrett and Creative Control attacked Hennig before the match. Bagwell made the save and cleared Jarrett and Creative Control with a 2x4 and began the match. Bagwell performed a Buff Blockbuster to win the match and force Hennig to retire.

Bret Hart took on Sting in the second semi-final match in the World Heavyweight Championship tournament. Sting knocked out the referee by bumping into him and then Lex Luger ran into the match and hit Sting in the knee with a baseball bat. Hart grabbed the bat from Luger and hit him with it and then applied a Sharpshooter and the referee disqualified Sting. Hart insisted on continuing the match because he did not want to win on a disqualification. Sting applied a Scorpion Deathlock on Hart but his injured knee gave up and Hart punched out of the move and applied his Sharpshooter to win the match. After the match, Sting and Hart shook hands with each other.

Berlyn took on Vampiro in a Dog Collar match. Before the match began, Oklahoma debuted in WCW along with Steve Williams and the two remained at ringside during the match. During the match, Wall dumped Berlyn after Wall tried to pin Vampiro and Berlyn got into his face and insulted him. Vampiro delivered a superplex on Berlyn and then performed a Nail in the Coffin and wrapped Berlyn's neck with a chain and applied a camel clutch for the victory.

Lex Luger took on Meng. Luger's neck was injured and he had worn a neck brace to fake an injury and get out of the match. Elizabeth attempted to spray Meng with a substance but Luger was accidentally sprayed with it and blinded in the eyes. Meng removed the neck brace and applied a Tongan Death Grip to win the match.

The United States Heavyweight Champion Scott Hall was scheduled to take on World Television Champion Rick Steiner in a title vs. title match but Steiner no-showed the event and Hall was awarded Steiner's World Television Championship via forfeit. Hall issued an open challenge putting both titles on the line and Booker T answered the challenge. Jeff Jarrett and Creative Control interfered in the match but Booker fought off Creative Control and argued with Jarrett on the middle turnbuckle, allowing Hall to take advantage by performing an Outsider's Edge to retain the titles. After the match, Jarrett and Creative Control attacked Booker until Midnight made the save.

David Flair took on Kimberly Page. Flair knocked out the referee with his crowbar and then Flair attempted to hit Page with a crowbar until Kanyon returned to WCW and made the save. Diamond Dallas Page showed up and delivered a Diamond Cutter to Flair and attempted to hit him with the crowbar but Arn Anderson stopped him and Flair hit Anderson in the back with the crowbar in anger.

Goldberg took on Sid Vicious in an "I Quit" match. Goldberg applied a bridging cobra clutch on Vicious to make him pass out to the hold and the referee stopped the match.

=== Main event match ===
In the main event, Chris Benoit took on Bret Hart in the final round of the thirty-two man tournament for the vacant WCW World Heavyweight Championship. Dean Malenko interfered to attack Benoit but Hart kicked him away. Scott Hall and Kevin Nash interfered in the latter portion of the match and Goldberg blocked Nash's interference with a spear. Goldberg brawled with Hall and Nash and their fight spilled to the backstage. Benoit attempted a Crippler Crossface on Hart but Hart blocked it and applied a Sharpshooter to win the title.

== Reception ==
Mayhem drew a crowd of 13,839 people and a revenue of $313,847. The event received negative reviews from critics.

In 2002, Scott Keith of 411Mania gave the event a rating of "Thumbs in the middle, leaning down," stating, "I really don't know where all the glowing reviews of this show are coming from. I mean, it had a really hot opener and a pretty decent main event, but there was just nothing of substance to fill the other 2 Ѕ hours in between. You could probably stretch and say the six-person was okay, but the lows were just too depressing and the highs weren't high enough to save it. Early buyrates for this show already are disappointing to WCW, which shouldn't be a surprise considering how piss-poor the promotion for it was."

In 2007, Arnold Furious of 411Mania gave the event a score of 4.5 [Poor], stating, "A show was a lot of potential but both the good matches were riddled with needless interference. Vince Russo's style of booking just couldn't produce great matches. He didn't have the attention span to book it and assumed the crowd didn't have an interest in watching it. Despite all of the truly great matches in wrestling being given, more often than not, at least 20 minutes and little/zero interference. Especially when you've got two great wrestlers who are super over like Bret & Benoit and you still book a shitload of interference. You can't have the crowd being hot and having something new happening every few seconds. You'll burn out the audience and no one will remember half the shit that happens. It's a lesson Vince Russo still hasn't learnt to this very day. Wrestling fans DO have attention spans. Especially on PPV."

In 2016, Kevin Pantoja of 411Mania gave the event a rating of 3.0 [Bad], stating, "A lot of late WCW is terrible, but this might have been the most frustrating show. There was potential in a few matches (all three tournament matches and the Revolution tag) but all of them disappointed. Part of it was on the performers and part of it was on the Russo booking. Too many run-ins, too much overbooking and too many meaningless backstage segments. Seriously, the Meng/Luger, Sid/Goldberg, Hennig/Buff and Vampiro/Berlyn matches were all horrible, while the Kimberly/David Flair stuff still managed to be the lowlight."

== Aftermath ==
On the November 22 episode of Monday Nitro, Bret Hart considered to defend the WCW World Heavyweight Championship against Goldberg at Starrcade. In the warmup to the event, Hart and Goldberg defeated Creative Control to win the WCW World Tag Team Championship on the December 7 episode of Thunder, only to lose it to The Outsiders, six days later on Nitro. At Starrcade, Hart controversially defeated Goldberg to retain the title in a no disqualification match when Roddy Piper ended the match while Hart had applied a Sharpshooter on Goldberg without Goldberg ever submitting.

Mayhem would be the last non-WWF, now WWE Pay-per-view held in Toronto until June 25, 2023 when Forbidden Door took place and was produced jointly by All Elite Wrestling and New Japan Pro-Wrestling. The venue was then renamed to the Scotiabank Arena in 2018.

== Results ==
No.	Results	Stipulations	Times
1	Chris Benoit defeated Jeff Jarrett	Tournament Semi-Final match	09:27
2	Evan Karagias (with Madusa) defeated Disco Inferno (c) (with Tony Marinara)	Singles match for the WCW Cruiserweight Championship	08:28
3	Norman Smiley defeated Brian Knobbs (with Jimmy Hart)	Hardcore match for the inaugural WCW Hardcore Championship	07:29
4	The Revolution (Perry Saturn, Dean Malenko and Asya) (with Shane Douglas) defeated The Filthy Animals (Eddie Guerrero, Billy Kidman and Torrie Wilson) (with Konnan)	Elimination match	11:15
5	Buff Bagwell defeated Curt Hennig	Retirement match	07:47
6	Bret Hart defeated Sting	Tournament Semi-Final match	09:27
7	Vampiro (with Jerry Only) defeated Berlyn (with The Wall)	Dog Collar match	04:57
8	Meng defeated The Total Package (with Elizabeth)	Singles match	05:23
9	Scott Hall (c) defeated Booker T	Singles match for the WCW United States Heavyweight and World Television Championships	06:04
10	David Flair vs. Kimberly Page ended in a no contest	Singles match	04:55
11	Goldberg defeated Sid Vicious by Technical Submission	"I Quit" match	05:30
12	Bret Hart defeated Chris Benoit	Tournament final for the vacant WCW World Heavyweight Championship	17:44
(c) / – the champion(s) heading into the match

=== Filthy Animals vs. Revolution eliminations ===
Elimination no.	Wrestler	Team	Eliminated by	Elimination move	Time
1	Billy Kidman	Filthy Animals	Dean Malenko	Roll-up	02:56
2	Dean Malenko	The Revolution	Eddie Guerrero	Hurricanrana	05:03
3	Asya	The Revolution	Eddie Guerrero	Frog Splash	06:28
4	Eddie Guerrero	Filthy Animals	Perry Saturn	Rings of Saturn	10:17
5	Torrie Wilson	Filthy Animals	Perry Saturn	Low Blow	10:55
Survivor:	Perry Saturn (The Revolution)				

=== Tournament bracket ===
First round (TV)
Bret Hart
Goldberg *
Eddie Guerrero
Perry Saturn
Norman Smiley
Bam Bam Bigelow
Billy Kidman
Konnan
The Total Package
Rick Steiner
Diamond Dallas Page
David Flair
Meng
Madusa
Sting
Brian Knobbs
Chris Benoit
Dean Malenko
La Parka **
Evan Karagias
Scott Hall
Sid Vicious
Ernest Miller
Lash LeRoux
Buff Bagwell
Stevie Ray
Vampiro
Berlyn
Disco Inferno
Curt Hennig
Booker T
Jeff Jarrett

Second round (TV)
Bret Hart
Perry Saturn
Norman Smiley
Billy Kidman
The Total Package
BYE
Meng
Sting
Chris Benoit
Madusa
Scott Hall
Lash Leroux
Buff Bagwell
Vampiro
Curt Hennig
Jeff Jarrett

Quarterfinals (TV)
Bret Hart
Billy Kidman
The Total Package
Sting
Chris Benoit
Scott Hall
Buff Bagwell
Jeff Jarrett

Semifinals (PPV)
Bret Hart
Sting
Chris Benoit
Jeff Jarrett

Finals (PPV)
Bret Hart
Chris Benoit

^1 Goldberg's United States Heavyweight Championship match was on the line. As a result of the stipulation, Hart won the title from Goldberg.

^2 La Parka was replaced by Madusa after she was allowed to re-enter the tournament following her loss to Meng.
