= WCW Backstage Assault =

2000 video game

- PlayStation cover featuring Goldberg and Kevin Nash
- Developer: Kodiak Interactive (Note: Additional work by EA Canada)
- Publisher: Electronic Arts
- Platforms: PlayStation, Nintendo 64
- Release: PlayStation: NA: November 8, 2000; EU: November 24, 2000; Nintendo 64: NA: December 12, 2000
- Genres: Sports
- Modes: Single-player, multiplayer

WCW Backstage Assault is a professional wrestling video game developed by Kodiak Interactive and published by Electronic Arts. It was released for the PlayStation in North America on November 8, 2000, and in Europe on November 24, 2000, and for the Nintendo 64 in North America on December 12, 2000. It was the final World Championship Wrestling (WCW) game released before the World Wrestling Federation (WWF) purchased WCW's assets three months later. WCW Backstage Assault features commentary by Tony Schiavone and Bobby "The Brain" Heenan. Gameplay takes place outside of a wrestling ring with cartoonized graphics, an approach that was poorly received and resulted in the title selling 200,000 copies.

== Gameplay ==
Backstage Assault is vastly different from other games of its genre. Previous wrestling games such as WWF SmackDown! and WCW Mayhem featured backstage areas as auxiliary fighting locations. In Backstage Assault, all of the gameplay takes place in backstage locations. There is no ring, and it is not possible to go into the main arena in front of the crowd.

All of the matches are conducted under "Hardcore Rules". As in traditional wrestling, one person can win by pinfall (holding the back of the opponent's shoulders to the ground while the referee counts to three), submission, or knock out. But these win conditions may be met anywhere, and the use of objects as weapons is encouraged. It is not possible to end a match by disqualification or count out. As gameplay is limited to only two characters, all matches are one-vs-one with no possibility of outside interference or teamwork.

The game takes place in an arena with seven connecting levels, having sixteen rooms in total. While a match may begin in one room, it can end anywhere the players can gain access to. When beginning 'Hardcore Challenge' or 'Hardcore Gauntlet' mode, they are confined to the Truck Arena for the first match. The player may return to rooms they had already visited as they progress through the modes. They do this by walking through open doors. Winning matches in these levels makes them permanently available in Exhibition mode.

Players inflict damage on each other to facilitate meeting one of the three win conditions. They do this by executing strikes, grapple moves, holds, hitting them with weapons, or causing the opponent to run or fall against a hazard. Some moves can be reversed, inflicting damage upon the person who initiated it. Successfully performing moves and taunts without interruption will increase momentum. When a player achieves "Max Momentum", they may perform their finishing move before the momentum drops again. The color of a player's name will change from white to yellow to red to flashing red as they take on damage. The more damage they take, the harder it will be for them to resist losing. Players can bleed if they take on took much damage.

The primary gameplay mode is called 'Hardcore Challenge'. The player will choose one character to pursue a specific championship with. They will then play a series of matches against random opponents. The first match will always be in the Truck Arena. After this initial victory, players may choose which connecting room (and therefore which opponent) they shall face next. The difficulty level and number of matches the player must play is determined by which title they choose. The final match will also be in the Truck Arena, and will be for the selected title. Players earn points based on their victories, moves performed and general skill shown. If they lose a match, they are only offered one further chance to win it. Losing the same match twice ends the campaign. Players can save their progress in between matches. If the player successfully wins the title, they will be added to the High Score chart if they are in the Top 10. Levels, moves and most hidden characters are unlocked through this mode. While players cannot defend the title, the character they used will be the designated champion next time they play the same mode.

'Hardcore Gauntlet' offers the player one chance to win seven matches on normal difficulty. They may not save their progress between rounds. Beating the mode earns a high score, and may unlock hidden characters.

'Exhibition' mode allows the player to play a single match against the computer or a second player. It has only three match types, two of which are exclusive to this mode. Normal matches are standard. 'First Blood' matches are won by causing the opponent to bleed, but can only be played on one-player mode. 'Human Torch' matches can only be played with two players. This match type is limited to the Truck Arena, and requires the winner to set their opponent on fire using the flaming barrel near the exit.

== Development ==
In August 1998, EA and Kodiak Interactive entered into a long-term multi-title development agreement that involved Kodiak developing games for EA based on the WCW license for the PlayStation and Nintendo 64 platforms.

== Reception ==
Reception

Aggregate score
Aggregator	Score	
Aggregator	N64	PS
Metacritic	48/100	40/100

Review scores
Publication	Score	
Publication	N64	PS
CNET Gamecenter	N/A	2/10
Electronic Gaming Monthly	4.67/10 (Note: In Electronic Gaming Monthly's review of the Nintendo 64 version, one critic gave it 4/10, and the rest gave it each a score of 5/10.)	4/10
Game Informer	3.5/10	3/10
GameSpot	5.1/10	5.1/10
GameZone	9/10	9/10
IGN	4/10	2/10
N64 Magazine	46%	N/A
Next Generation	N/A	2/5
Nintendo Power	6.2/10	N/A
PlayStation Official Magazine – UK	N/A	6/10
Official U.S. PlayStation Magazine	N/A	2/5

WCW Backstage Assault received "generally unfavorable reviews" on both platforms according to the review aggregation website Metacritic. Daniel Erickson of NextGen was negative to the PlayStation version. Lamchop of GamePro's reviewed Nintendo 64 (Note: GamePro gave the Nintendo 64 version two 3.5/5 scores for graphics and fun factor, 4.5/5 for sound, and 4/5 for control.) and PlayStation versions. (Note: GamePro gave the PlayStation version three 3.5/5 scores for graphics, control, and fun factor, and 4.5/5 for sound.) While generally positive to the game, Lamchop also commented that the fans of wrestler games would pick up the title in their collection, while others would avoid or pick them up as rental titles.

== Rumored PlayStation 2 version ==
The May 2000 edition of PSM featured a cover story on an upcoming game titled WCW 2000, with an interview with the game's producers: senior producer Chuck Osieja and producers Gary Lam and Ian Vechere of EA Canada. In the interview, the producers describe the game to be focused on Hardcore Rules in a "Hardcore Challenge" that would progressively unlock more WCW stars and fighting environments, much like what would become Backstage Assault. Later in the magazine, Stephen Frost writes that WCW's newest game will feature "an extremely high polygon count", take place without a ring, and will be released in Q4 2000.

The November 2000 issue of PSM indicated that a PlayStation 2 version of Backstage Assault was pushed back to Spring 2001 while a reader asked PSM in their March 2001 issue if the WCW 2000 game that was the featured cover story from the May 2000 issue was simply a port of Backstage Assault for the PlayStation 2 and if it was still happening in the magazine's Q&A section. PSM confirmed that WCW 2000 had become WCW Backstage Assault and a PlayStation 2 release was still on target for Spring 2001. In January 2025, YouTuber Matt McMuscles revealed with the permission of Dave Lang, one of the game's developers, that there never was a PlayStation 2 version in development as EA had moved on from the title soon after release, and that the purported screenshots were higher-quality renders and PSM assumed, without properly vetting, that the screenshots were from a PlayStation 2 version of the game.

== See also ==
- List of licensed wrestling video games
