= WCW Mayhem (video game) =

1999 video game

- PAL PlayStation cover art featuring Goldberg
- Developers: Kodiak Interactive (Note: Additional work by EA Canada); 2n Productions (GBC)
- Publisher: Electronic Arts
- Platforms: Nintendo 64; PlayStation; Game Boy Color
- Release: Nintendo 64, PlayStation: NA: September 23, 1999; EU: September 24, 1999; Game Boy Color: NA: May 9, 2000; EU: August 3, 2000
- Genres: Sports
- Modes: Single-player, multiplayer

WCW Mayhem is a professional wrestling video game developed by Kodiak Interactive (2n Productions for the Game Boy Color) and published by Electronic Arts, based on the American promotion World Championship Wrestling (WCW). The first WCW game produced by Electronic Arts, it was released for Nintendo 64 and PlayStation in North America on September 23, 1999, and in Europe on September 24, 1999, and for the Game Boy Color in North America on May 9, 2000, and in Europe on August 3, 2000.

The game featured several firsts for a wrestling title. For instance, Mayhem was the first game to feature all twelve WCW pay-per-view venues as well as all three major WCW television shows (Nitro, Thunder, and Saturday Night). Mayhem was also the first wrestling game released in the United States to include backstage areas, a feature which would be expanded upon in its sequel, WCW Backstage Assault. It was also one of the first wrestling games to integrate audio commentary provided by Bobby Heenan and Tony Schiavone; although, only Schiavone was included in the N64 version despite some of his lines being addressed directly to Heenan.

Mayhem also featured a Pay-Per-View mode which was unique from other wrestling games, in that the player could enter a code to unlock real-life pay-per-view match lineups; these codes would be given on Monday Nitro broadcasts the week before a pay-per-view. However, this only lasted for three months (ending with the pay-per-view of the same name), as the games' roster was outdated soon after its release, with several of the featured wrestlers leaving WCW. The game was partially sponsored by Surge soft drinks at the time of game release.

== Gameplay ==
The game offers players the chance to play more than 50 wrestlers and create one using the create-a-wrestler feature. It uses an entirely new control scheme not seen in previous WCW video games published by THQ.

== Roster ==
The in-game roster featured a variety of onscreen talent from WCW. Not all of them were wrestlers as managers, an announcer and other staff were available as playable characters. Most were unlocked via progressing through the 'Quest For The Best' mode, or by cheat code. There were no female characters.

The roster was divided into six sub-rosters: WCW, nWo Hollywood, nWo Wolfpac, Four Horsemen, Cruiserweight, and Hardcore, plus additional sub-rosters for created wrestlers stored on each available Controller Pak. Only people on the Cruiserweight list could compete for the WCW Cruiserweight Championship in Quest For The Best mode. Despite the existence of a Hardcore division, there were no other references to the WCW Hardcore Championship.

The game was noted for having a roster that was quickly out of date. Chris Jericho and Raven had already been making onscreen appearances for rival companies before the game was released (in fact Jericho appears as an playable wrestler in WWF WrestleMania 2000 for the Nintendo 64, also released in 1999). Several people would leave the company just before or within weeks of the release, including Dean Malenko and Eddy Guerrero. Surprisingly, Bobby Blaze and Bobby Eaton featured on the playable roster despite not being currently active in WCW for some time.

While players could play as Sting with his traditional look, there was an unlockable character called 'Wolfpac Sting' that allowed players to use his old look. Similarly, a cheat code allowed players to revert Rey Mysterio, Jr's updated appearance back to his more popular luchador attire. Another cheat code known as "Jobber Billy Kidman" replaced three characters with an unidentified programmer and his two sons.

Hidden within the games audio files are commentary for over a dozen other personalities, as well as most of the programmers. The known names included Tony Schiavone, Rick Rude, Paul Orndorff, Mike Enos and Ted DiBiase.

== Arenas ==
While all of the arenas had the same principal layout, they were all based on WCW television shows and pay-per-views. It included both updated and original versions of the Thunder and Monday Night Nitro sets (even though one must be unlocked). All arenas had an opening where wrestlers would enter the area. Wrestlers could also leave via this passageway. If players did this in a match where there was no count out, they could access a back room. There was 13 back rooms in total based on different locations around a standard sports arena, including the parking lot, ticket office, and bathrooms. Each back room had objects that could be used as weapons, and sometimes had another wrestler waiting to ambush the players.

== Development ==
On March 11, 1998, THQ; the publisher of WCW's video games, announced that they would not renew their licensing agreement with WCW which was due to expire at the end of December 1998. The announcement hit the publisher's stock market as WCW products made most of THQ's profits. Soon after in April 1998, THQ in partnership with toy company Jakks Pacific, acquired the license to WCW's main rival World Wrestling Federation (WWF) once the WWF's deal with Acclaim Entertainment expired.

On March 12, 1998, Electronic Arts (EA) entered into a new video game licensing deal with WCW for new video games, with the first one to be released in Spring 1999.

Mayhem's working title was WCW/nWo Mayhem, as evidenced by early photographs featuring wrestlers wearing shirts with an older Mayhem logo. The game was promoted for months on WCW television, including a counter which appeared on programs such as Monday Nitro and Thunder, counting down the days, hours, minutes, and seconds to Mayhem's Nintendo 64 and PlayStation release on September 23, 1999. A clip was even shown of Goldberg's character in a house environment spearing someone through a wall but the move and the house area were not seen in the final game.

A sequel to this game, tentatively titled WCW Mayhem 2, was planned for release on the PlayStation 2 in 2001. The game was slated to be developed by Aki Corporation, the developers of acclaimed WCW and WWF titles for the Nintendo 64. However, due to WCW being purchased by the WWF, the game's development was canceled. Aki would instead develop Def Jam Vendetta for the next generation of consoles. Work on WCW Mayhem 2 began mainly in response to the failure of WCW Backstage Assault.

== Reception ==
Reception

Aggregate score
Aggregator	Score		
Aggregator	GBC	N64	PS
GameRankings	64%	68%	73%

Review scores
Publication	Score		
Publication	GBC	N64	PS
AllGame	2/5	2.5/5	3.5/5
CNET Gamecenter	6/10	6/10	7/10
Electronic Gaming Monthly	N/A	5.5/10	5.25/10 (Note: In Electronic Gaming Monthly's review of the PlayStation version, two critics gave it each a score of 5.5/10, one gave it 4/10, and the other gave it 6/10.)
Game Informer	7.75/10	7.5/10	8/10
GameFan	N/A	82%	(J.W.) 80% 61% (Note: In GameFan's viewpoint of the PlayStation version, three critics gave it each a score of 68, 55, and 60.)
GameRevolution	N/A	D+	D+
GameSpot	6.7/10	7/10	7.4/10
Hyper	N/A	72%	N/A
IGN	7/10	8.5/10	7.5/10
N64 Magazine	N/A	78%	N/A
Next Generation	N/A	1/5	N/A
Nintendo Power	N/A	7.5/10	N/A
Official U.S. PlayStation Magazine	N/A	N/A	3.5/5

Daniel Erickson of NextGen said of the Nintendo 64 version, "If this game existed in a total vacuum, it would barely pass – in the face of Wrestlemania 2000 and even [WWF] Attitude, it's simply inexcusable."

The Freshman of GamePro said of the Nintendo 64 version in one review, "If you're a fan of the action and the 'showbiz' of wrestling, then it looks like you're up for some Mayhem. "He gave the Nintendo 64 version two 4.5/5 scores for graphics and fun factor, 4/5 for sound, and 3.5/5 for control. In a separate review, The Rookie called the N64 version "a fine game if you're a fan of the league. It's also a good place to start if you're a newbie. If you want more depth and something with a more sim-like feel, however, stick to WWF Attitude." He gave the Nintendo 64 version 4/5 for graphics, and three 3.5/5 scores for sound, control, and fun factor.

The D-Pad Destroyer said of the PlayStation version, "Wrestling fans, you have a choice here. If you're into the art and the moves, then WCW Mayhem may leave you dazed by its simplicity. But if you watch wrestling for the show and the action, then Mayhem is right up your alley. It's fast, simple and action-packed, and it's the best bodyslam on the Playstation." He gave the PlayStation version two 4/5 scores for graphics and fun factor, 4.5/5 for sound, and 3.5/5 for control. In a separate review, Four-Eyed Dragon called the PlayStation version "a solid wrestling title despite its mediocre looks and uneven gameplay. While not exactly up to par with Attitude, the game can still go one-on-one with the great one.". He gave the game gave the PlayStation version 3/5 for graphics, 4.5/5 for sound, and two 3.5/5 scores for control and fun factor.

The game was criticized for its poor collision detection and lack of diverse movesets. It was, however, praised for its smooth and detailed looking graphics and the sound was also highly praised.

== See also ==
- List of licensed wrestling video games
