= Grayson (surname) =

- Pronunciation: GRAY-sən

Other names
- Variant forms: Greyson, Grason, Gray ("son of"), Grey ("son of").

Grayson is a surname that is most probably either an anglicization of the Scottish or Irish clan surnames Grierson or Gray; alternatively, it can also be found in Northern England as a derivative of the English surname Gravesson, meaning "son of the reeve". It has been postulated as a Clan Gregor alias, but there is little surviving information to support this claim.

== Notable people with the surname "Grayson" include ==
- Alan Grayson (born 1958), American politician
- Alfred W. Grayson, American politician
- Andrew J. Grayson (1819–1869), American ornithologist and artist
- Bette Grayson (1920–1954), American actress
- Betty Evans Grayson (1925–1979), American softball pitcher
- Bobby Grayson (1914–1981), American football player
- Bradley Grayson (born 1994), English footballer
- Campbell Grayson (born 1986), New Zealand squash player
- Cary T. Grayson (1878–1938), American surgeon
- Cecil Grayson (1920–1998), English scholar
- Charles Grayson (disambiguation), multiple people
- C. Jackson Grayson (1923–2017), American businessman
- Clifford Prevost Grayson (1857–1951), American painter
- Cyril Grayson (born 1993), American football player
- Dan Grayson (1967–2021), American football player
- Dave Grayson (1939–2017), American football player
- David Grayson (disambiguation), multiple people
- Devin Grayson (born 1970), American comic book writer
- Diane Grayson (born 1948), English actress
- Ethel Grayson (1890–1980), Canadian writer
- Frances Wilson Grayson (1892–1927), American aviator
- Francis Grayson (1849–1927), Australian shopkeeper
- G. B. Grayson (1887–1930), American musician
- Garrett Grayson (born 1991), American football player
- George Grayson (disambiguation), multiple people
- Godfrey Grayson (1913–1998), English film director
- Harry Grayson (1894–1968), American sportswriter
- Helen Grayson (1902–1962), American cinematographer
- Henry Grayson (1865–1951), English shipbuilder
- Henry Joseph Grayson (1856–1918), English scientist
- Jack Grayson, American musician
- James Grayson (1897–1980), English music industry executive
- James Grayson (born 1998), English professional rugby union player
- James H. Grayson (born 1944), American scholar religions and folklore of Korea
- Jeff Grayson (disambiguation), multiple people
- Jerry Grayson (born 1955), British naval pilot
- Jessie Coles Grayson (1886–1953), American actress
- Joe Grayson (born 1999), English footballer
- John Grayson (disambiguation), multiple people
- Kathryn Grayson (1922–2010), American singer and actress
- Larry Grayson (1923–1995), British television personality
- Lawrence Grayson (1839–1916), Australian politician
- Lisa Grayson (born 1972), British gymnast
- Neil Grayson (born 1964), English footballer
- Paul Grayson (disambiguation), multiple people
- Peter W. Grayson (1788–1838), American attorney and diplomat
- Ralph Grayson (1921–1991), American scientist and engineer
- Richard Grayson (disambiguation), multiple people
- Robert Grayson (disambiguation), multiple people
- Simon Grayson (born 1969), British footballer
- Stu Grayson (born 1989), Canadian professional wrestler
- Stuart Grayson (1923–2001), American minister
- Tim Grayson (born 1967), American politician
- Trey Grayson (born 1972), American politician
- Vaughan Grayson (1894–1995), Canadian artist
- Victor Grayson (1881–1920), British politician
- Virginia Grayson (born 1967), New Zealand-Australian artist
- Wayne Grayson (born 1974), American voice actor
- William Grayson (disambiguation), multiple people

== Fictional characters ==
- Carter Grayson, a character on the television series Power Rangers Lightspeed Rescue.
- Charlotte Grayson, a character on the television show Revenge
- Conrad Grayson, a character on the television show Revenge
- The Flying Graysons (John and Mary Grayson), the parents of Dick Grayson in DC Comics
- Richard "Dick" Grayson, DC Comics character
- Mark Grayson, the secret identity of the teen superhero Invincible, the main character in the comic book series of same name
- Jayne Grayson, a character on the television show Holby City
- Victoria Grayson, a character on the television show Revenge

== See also ==
- Grayson (given name), a page for people with the given name Grayson
- Grayson (disambiguation), a disambiguation page for Grayson
- Greyson, a page for Grayson
