= Grayson =

Grayson may refer to:

== Places ==
=== Canada ===
- Grayson, Saskatchewan
- Rural Municipality of Grayson No. 184, Saskatchewan

=== United States ===
- Grayson, California
- Grayson, Georgia
  - Grayson High School
- Grayson, Kentucky
- Grayson, Louisiana
- Grayson, Missouri
- Grayson, North Carolina
- Grayson, Ohio
- Grayson, Oklahoma
- Grayson, Utah, former name of Blanding, Utah
- Grayson County (disambiguation)

=== United Kingdom ===
- Grayson Green, a small village in the ward of Harrington, Cumbria

== Other uses ==
- Grayson (surname)
- Grayson (given name)
- Grayson (film) (2004), fan film trailer
- Grayson County College, a community college
- Grayson Lake, a 1,500 acres (6.1 km^{2}) reservoir
- Grayson Stadium, a stadium in Savannah, Georgia, United States
- Grayson (comic book), published by DC Comics

== See also ==
- Greyson, a given name and a surname
- Grason (disambiguation)
