= Rayson =

Surname

Rayson is a surname. Notable people with the surname include:

- Rayson Huang, CBE (1920–2015), chemist
- Anthony Rayson, American anarchist activist and author
- Arthur Rayson (1898–1970), Australian rules footballer
- Hannie Rayson (born 1957), Australian playwright
- John Rayson (born 1949), Broward County, Florida attorney
- Leland Rayson (1921–2001), American lawyer and politician
- Noel Rayson (1933–2003), former Australian rules footballer
- Roger Rayson (born 1942), Australian cricketer
- Rayson Tan, Singaporean MediaCorp actor

== See also ==
- Drayson
- Grayson (disambiguation)
- Rason
