= Grayson (given name) =

Grayson is primarily a masculine given name. Notable people with the name include:

== People with the given name "Grayson" include ==
- Grayson Allen (born 1995), American basketball player
- Grayson Barber (born 2000), American soccer player
- Grayson Bell (born 1997), Australian swimmer
- Grayson Boucher (born 1984), American streetball player
- Grayson Bourne, British canoeist
- Grayson Capps (born 1967), American singer-songwriter
- Grayson Davey (born 2001), American sport shooter
- Grayson Dettoni (born 2005), American soccer player
- Grayson Dolan (born 1999), American YouTube personality
- Grayson Doody (born 2002), American soccer player
- Grayson Dupont (born 1998), American soccer player
- Grayson Earle (born 1987), American artist
- Grayson Garvin (born 1989), American baseball player
- Grayson Gilbert (born 1990), American entrepreneur
- Grayson Greiner (born 1992), American baseball player
- Grayson Hajash (1925–2015), American football player
- Grayson Hall (1922–1985), American actress
- Grayson Hart (born 1988), New Zealand rugby union footballer
- Grayson Hugh (born 1960), American singer-songwriter
- Grayson James (born 2002), American football player
- Grayson L. Kirk (1903–1997), American academic administrator
- Grayson Lookner, American politician
- Grayson McCall (born 2000), American football player
- Grayson McCouch (born 1968), American actor
- Grayson Moore, Canadian filmmaker
- Grayson Murphy (disambiguation), multiple people
- Grayson Murray (1993–2024), American golfer
- Grayson Perry (born 1960), British artist
- Grayson Rodriguez (born 1999), American baseball player
- Grayson Russell (born 1998), American actor
- Grayson Shillingford (1944–2009), West Indian cricketer
- Grayson Waller (born 1990), Australian professional wrestler

== Fictional characters ==
- Grayson Sinclair, a character on the British soap opera Emmerdale

== See also ==
- Greyson, given name and surname
