= Gayson =

Gayson is both a surname and a given name. Notable people with the name include:

- Eunice Gayson (1931–2018), British actress
- Gayson Gregory (born 1982), Antiguan footballer

== See also ==
- Grayson (surname)
- Mayson
- Rayson
