= Michael Larson (disambiguation) =

Michael Larson was an American TV game show contestant who exposed a systemic failure, resulting in the Press Your Luck scandal.

Michael Larson may also refer to:

- Michael Larson (businessman) (born 1959), American money manager
- Michael Larson, actor in The Scam Artist
- Michael Larson, musician in Psykosonik

== See also ==
- Michael Larsen (disambiguation)
