= Kimberly Page =

American professional wrestling valet

Personal information
- Born: Kimberly Lynne Bacon; January 1, 1970 (age 56) Chicago, Illinois, U.S.
- Education: Auburn University; Northwestern University
- Spouse: Diamond Dallas Page (m. 1991; div. 2005)

Professional wrestling career
- Ring name(s): The Booty Babe; Diamond Doll; Kimberly; Kimberly Page
- Debut: 1994
- Retired: 2000

Kimberly Lynne Bacon (born January 1, 1970) is an American former professional wrestling personality. Known by her World Championship Wrestling ring name Kimberly Page, she was the leader of The Nitro Girls and the valet for her then-husband wrestler Diamond Dallas Page. She appeared in Playboy newsstand pictorials from 1994 to 1999, and has been featured in Iron Man magazine for her fitness workouts.

== Biography ==
Kimberly Bacon was born on New Year's Day in Chicago, Illinois, but grew up in Fort Myers, Florida. Kimberly met Page Falkinburg, who wrestled under the name Diamond Dallas Page, at his Florida nightclub in December 1990 when she was 20 years old. They began dating shortly after. She graduated from Auburn University with a degree in public relations and journalism in 1990. Diamond Dallas Page worked as a manager in World Championship Wrestling, while Kimberly completed a master's degree in advertising from Northwestern University, graduating in 1991. She worked in the advertising industry for a brief time as a public relations coordinator and account executive before joining Page in the wrestling business.

She appeared on the covers of both Physical (January 2003) and Iron Man (November 2003).

== WCW career ==
Her first WCW television appearance was in 1994 as Diamond Dallas Page's valet, "The Diamond Doll."

Page was engaged in a feud with Dave Sullivan, who objected to how Page treated her. Page won that feud but ended up losing Kimberly in a match to Johnny B. Badd (Marc Mero) at the WCW World War 3 pay-per-view event in 1995. Badd promptly freed her and she became his valet, simply going by the name of Kimberly. After Mero departed for the World Wrestling Federation, she became The Booty Babe for The Booty Man, who had recently shed his "Zodiac" gimmick and left the Dungeon of Doom. The gimmick lasted until June 1996.

Kimberly did not appear on WCW programming again until March 1997's Uncensored, when she rejoined Page (now a face after having refused to join the New World Order) as part of his feud with "Macho Man" Randy Savage, who had interrupted a Gene Okerlund interview with Page. Miss Elizabeth then flashed a nWo-defaced centerfold of Kimberly from the 1997 edition of Playboy's Nude Celebrities, after which Kimberly herself appeared from backstage having been spray-painted off-screen by the nWo. The segment was also the first public revelation of Page and Kimberly being an actual married couple.

After the Page/Savage feud ended, Kimberly formed The Nitro Girls in July. They danced during breaks on WCW Monday Nitro to entertain the fans. The Nitro Girls were given their own official website, while she and several members appeared in a non-nude pictorial in the September 1998 issue of Penthouse, and filmed a 1999 pay-per-view. In February 1999, Kimberly became involved in an angle in which she was being stalked by Scott Steiner, which culminated in Page attacking Steiner in the arena parking garage on the February 8 episode of WCW Monday Nitro as Steiner followed her to her car; Steiner then stole the car with Kim inside, and attempted to run over Page in the garage. He then threw Kimberly (actually a stunt woman) from the car, and she was later taken away in an ambulance.

In October 1999, Kimberly again accompanied Page to the ring as his valet. On the November 1, 1999 episode of WCW Monday Nitro she departed the Nitro Girls and later took part in a match against David Flair at Mayhem on November 21. In 2000, she turned heel on Page to join Vince Russo and Eric Bischoff's New Blood stable. In the storyline, she decided it was "all about me" instead of Page, and it was hinted she was romantically involved with Bischoff. She had brief feuds with Miss Elizabeth and Miss Hancock, and was also briefly paired with Mike Awesome, before her departure from WCW in June 2000.

Kimberly Page on a You Tube Interview with Hannibal said they divorced in 2011, legally separated in 2004 and only sought to divorce when one decided to remarry

== Acting career ==
While living in Atlanta, Page took acting jobs at the Alliance Theatre, then moved to Los Angeles to pursue acting as a career. Her first film role was a deleted scene in 2001's Rat Race that was included in the DVD extras, and her first starring role was in 2004's The Scam Artist.

She played Catwoman in the 2004 short fan film Grayson and in 2005 appeared on CSI: Miami as Horatio Caine's murdered girlfriend in the episode "Under Suspicion". Also in the 2005 movie The 40-Year-Old Virgin, she was in the "Date-A-Palooza" scene as Carol, the woman whose breast fell out of her shirt while she was talking. She currently lives in Park City, Utah, working in marketing and interior design.

== Championships and accomplishments ==
- World Championship Wrestling
  - WCW Nitro Girls — Founder
  - WCW Nitro Girls PPV — 1999
