= Pancreatoblastoma =

- Specialty: Oncology

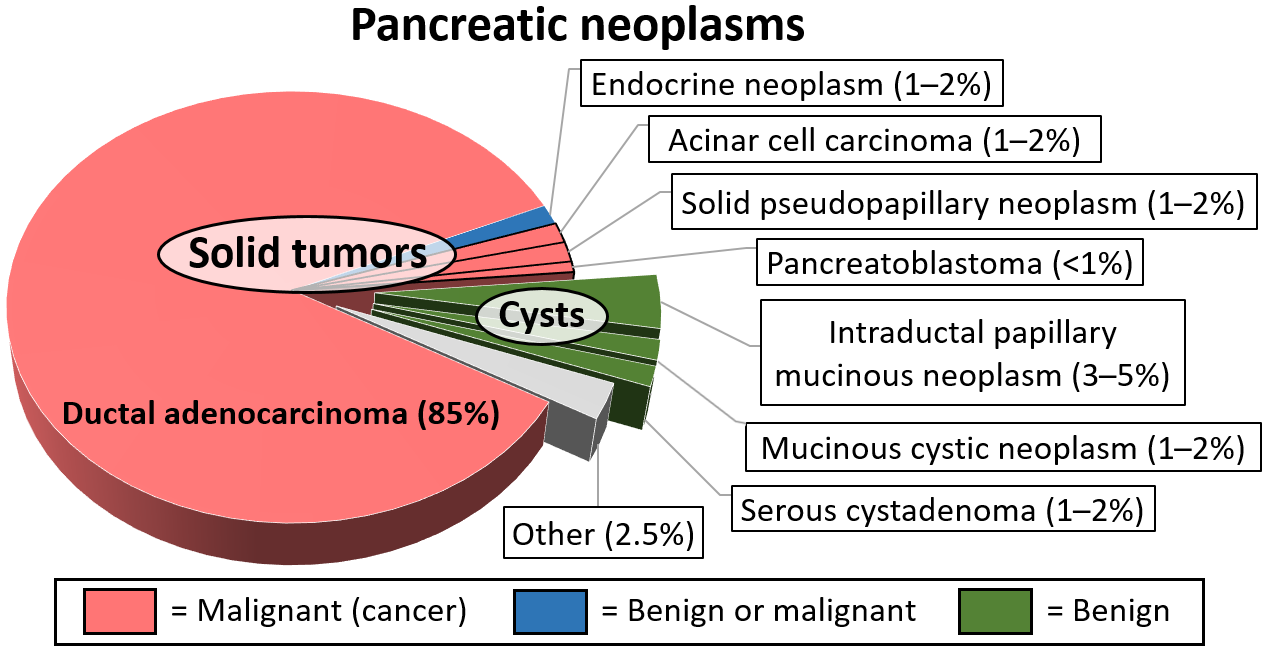
Relative incidences of various pancreatic neoplasms, with pancreatoblastoma annotated at center right.

Pancreatoblastoma is a rare type of pancreatic cancer. It occurs mainly in childhood and has a relatively good prognosis.

== Symptoms ==
Children with pancreatoblastoma rarely present with early-stage disease, instead, most present with locally advanced or metastatic disease. Common presenting symptoms include abdominal pain, emesis, and jaundice. A multidisciplinary approach including good clinical history, state of the art imaging, and careful pathology is often needed to establish the correct diagnosis.

== Pathology ==
Resected pancreatoblastomas can be quite large, ranging from 2 centimeters to 20 centimeters in size (1 to 8 inches). They are typically solid, soft masses. Under the microscope, at least two cell types are seen: cells with “acinar” differentiation, and cells forming small “squamoid” nests. The cells with acinar differentiation have some features of the normal acinar cell of the pancreas (the most common cell in the normal pancreas).

== Diagnosis ==
Histopathology shows two pancreatic lines of differentiation which can be acinar, ductal or neuroendocrine.

Characteristic feature is presence of squamoid nests. Tumor is overall hypercellular, with lobules separated by fibrotic bands.

== Treatment ==
If the tumor is operable, the first line of therapy should be surgical resection. Then, after surgical resection, adjuvant chemotherapy should be given, even in stage I disease. In patients with inoperable disease, chemotherapy alone should be given. A multi-disciplinary approach to the treatment, including surgeons, oncologists, pathologists, radiologists, and radiation oncologists, is often the best approach to managing these patients.

== See also ==
- Grayson Gilbert
