= Reid Flair =

American professional wrestler (1988–2013)

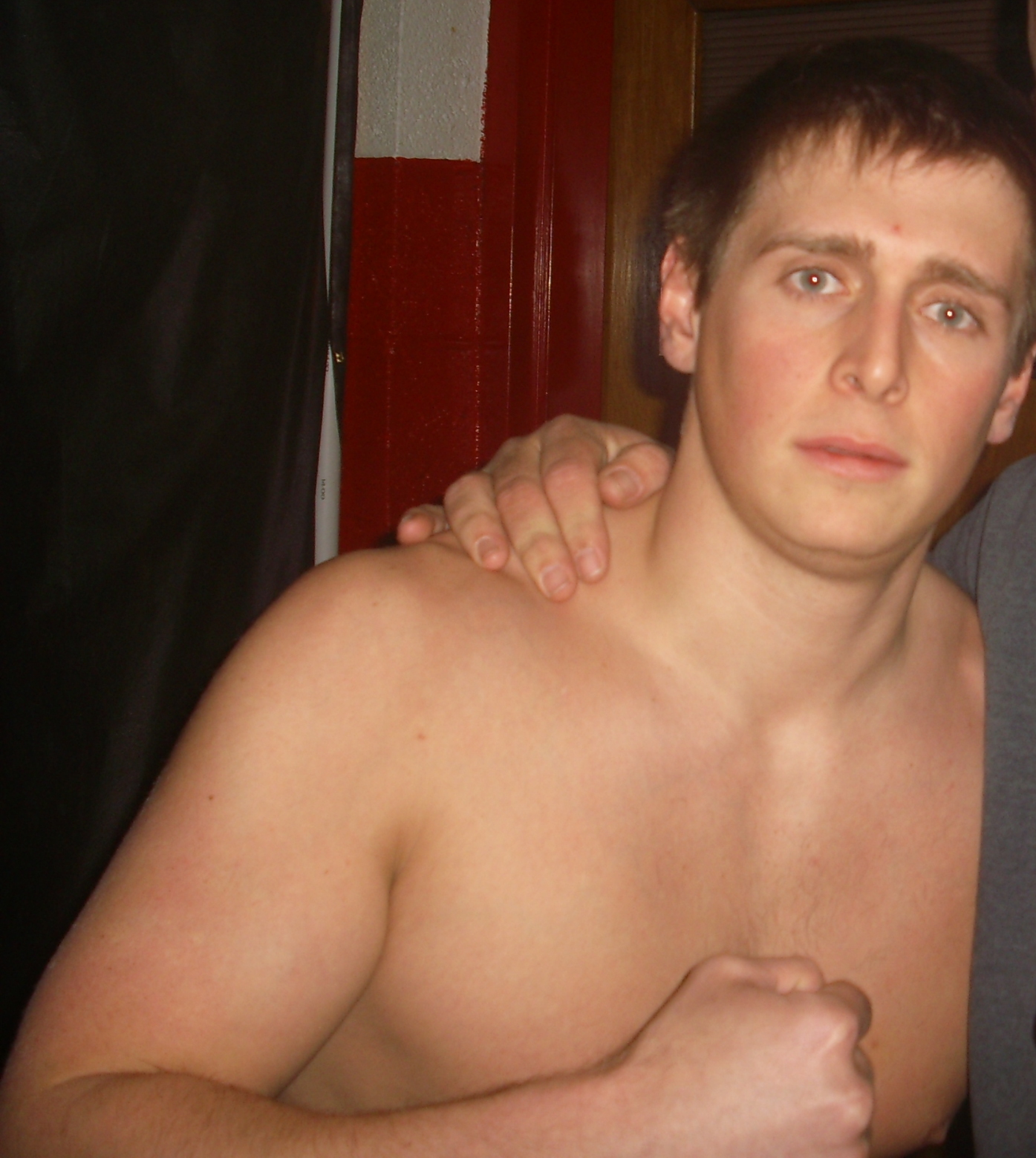
- Flair in 2007

Personal information
- Born: Richard Reid Fliehr; February 26, 1988 Charlotte, North Carolina, U.S.
- Died: March 29, 2013 (aged 25) Charlotte, North Carolina, U.S.
- Cause of death: Drug overdose from clonazepam
- Parent: Ric Flair (father)
- Relatives: Ashley (sister); David Flair (half-brother)

Professional wrestling career
- Ring name: Reid Flair
- Billed height: 6 ft 3 in (191 cm)
- Billed weight: 215 lb (98 kg)
- Billed from: Charlotte, North Carolina
- Trained by: Ric Flair; Harley Race; George South; Terry Taylor
- Debut: October 4, 1998

Richard Reid Fliehr (February 26, 1988 – March 29, 2013), better known by his ring name Reid Flair, was an American professional wrestler. He was the youngest son of professional wrestler Ric Flair, the younger half-brother of wrestler David Flair and the younger brother of wrestler Charlotte Flair. He was best known for his appearances alongside his father in World Championship Wrestling (WCW) and for his appearances with All Japan Pro Wrestling (AJPW).

== Amateur wrestling career ==
In April 1998, Flair won the AAU National Wrestling Tournament. Flair attended Providence High School in Charlotte, North Carolina and Blair Academy in Blairstown, New Jersey, and was an accomplished amateur wrestler achieving numerous awards. During a tournament in Missouri, Flair attacked another competitor after he taunted Flair by mocking his father. During another tournament in Oklahoma, Flair was disqualified from competing after punching an opponent. His father, Ric Flair, had earlier thrown the same opponent off the mat during the match and was escorted off the tournament property by police.

== Professional wrestling career ==
=== World Championship Wrestling (1998, 2000) ===
Fliehr wrestled two matches in World Championship Wrestling (WCW). In the first, on October 4, 1998, he was ten years old when he defeated Eric Bischoff and on June 12, 2000, he teamed with his father Ric in a loss to David Flair and Vince Russo in a tag team match.

=== United States (2008–2012) ===
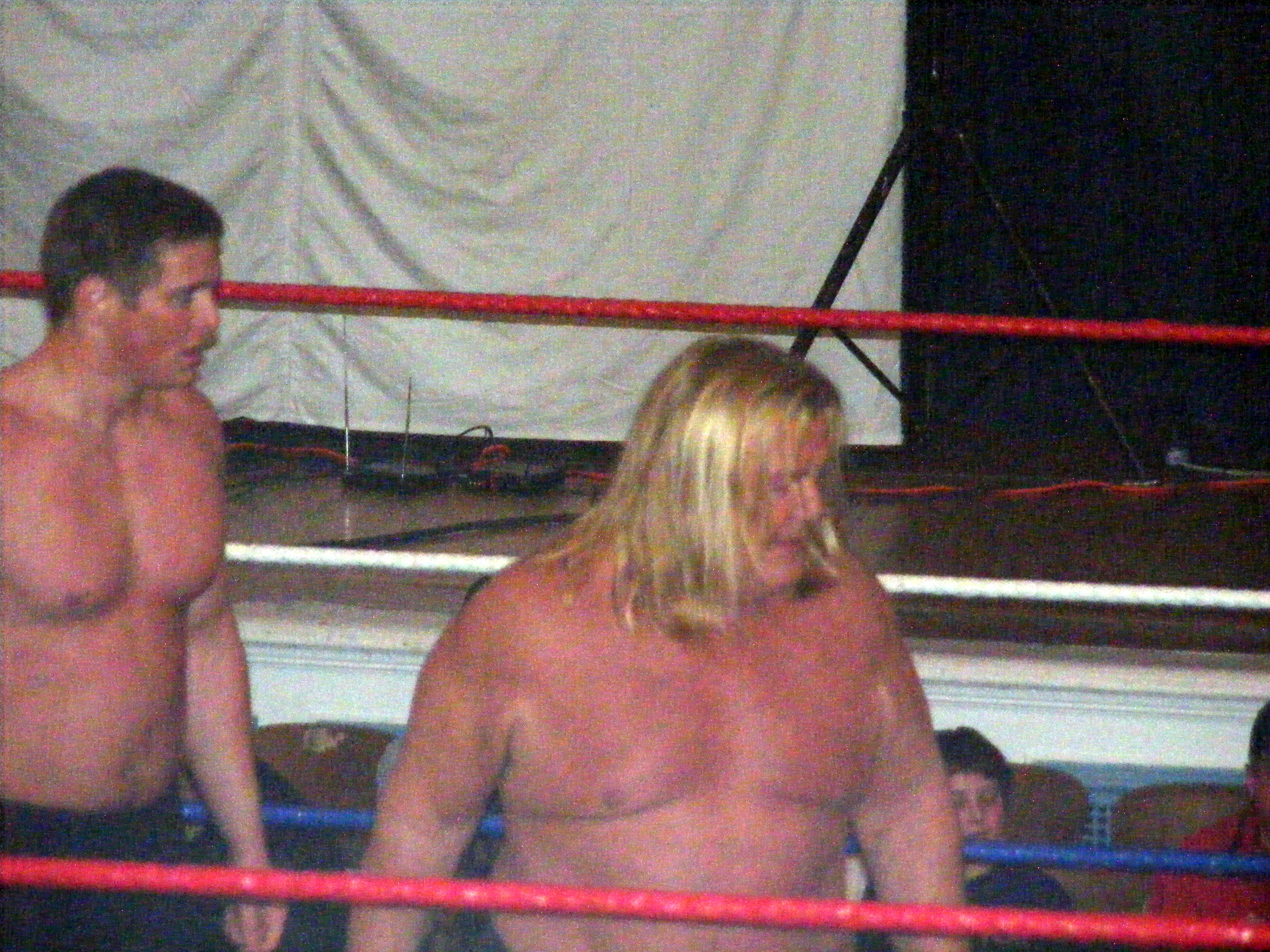
Flair (left) in a tag team match with Greg Valentine

Fliehr made an appearance on March 29, 2008, during the WWE Hall of Fame. The next night, he made his first WrestleMania appearance with his family representing Ric Flair in the Hall of Fame. He also sat at ringside during the WrestleMania XXIV event. He appeared on Raw the following night with his family to honor his father's career. Throughout 2008, Flair was trained by Harley Race. Flair made his debut on December 6, 2008, under the name "Reid Flair", teaming with his elder brother David to defeat The Nasty Boys in Charlotte, North Carolina, with Hulk Hogan as the special guest referee. He wrestled for many independent promotions such as Big Time Wrestling and Northeast Wrestling.

On April 11, 2009, Flair, his brother David, and Brad Anderson beat Jeff Lewis, C. W. Anderson and Masked Superstar at an NWA Charlotte show. The match ended controversially with a double pin, when Flair pinned Lewis while CW Anderson pinned Brad Anderson. At the end of the match, Flair was awarded the NWA Mid-Atlantic Heritage Championship belt. At NWA Charlotte's next show on May 25, however, Lewis was announced as the NWA Mid-Atlantic Heritage Champion, with no explanation given. On May 2, he and David took on Buff Bagwell and Rikki Nelson and would lose. In June 2010, Reid teamed up with George South Jr. to take part in The Anderson Brothers Classic 4 Tournament where they defeated Caleb Konley and Cedric Alexander in the semi-finals and Charlie Dreamer and Jake Manning in the final. In August he made his debut for Lucha Libre USA.

In the same month next year he participated in NWA Future Legends Tournament and lost to John Skyler in the semi-final.

=== All Japan Pro Wrestling (2013) ===
In late 2012, it was reported that Flair had started training with All Japan Pro Wrestling. Flair made his in-ring debut for All Japan on January 26, 2013, when he replaced his sick father in a tag team match, where he and Keiji Mutoh were defeated by Seiya Sanada and Tatsumi Fujinami, with Sanada submitting him for the win. During February, Flair worked All Japan's Excite Series tour, wrestling undercard tag team matches. On March 15, Flair wrestled his first singles match in All Japan, submitting Yasufumi Nakanoue with the figure-four leglock. Flair returned to the United States following All Japan's March 17 event, which was 12 days before his death.

== Personal life ==
Fliehr was born in Charlotte, North Carolina, to professional wrestler Ric Flair and Elizabeth Fliehr. He was the youngest of four siblings including his half-sister, Megan; a half-brother, David; and full sister, Ashley. His favorite band was Guns N' Roses.

Fliehr was arrested on June 23, 2007, for assault and battery, and was released after posting bail. On March 4, 2009, Fliehr was arrested for driving while impaired in Mecklenburg County, North Carolina, and was released after posting $1000 in bail. Fliehr was arrested again on April 26, 2009 after crashing his car, police found black tar heroin inside it, and he faced felony charges. He was also charged with driving while impaired, driving with a revoked license, and possession of drug paraphernalia, and was released after posting $15,000 in bail. He later overdosed twice in 2011.

During the Ric Flair 30 for 30 special, Triple H revealed that Fliehr wanted to sign a developmental contract with WWE but failed two drug tests.

== Death ==
On March 29, 2013, Flair was found dead in bed at a Residence Inn by Marriott in the SouthPark neighborhood of Charlotte, North Carolina. He was 25 years old. On June 14, 2013, Flair's autopsy revealed that it was a drug overdose of heroin and traces of two prescription benzodiazepines: clonazepam, and alprazolam, which contributed to his death.

== Championships and accomplishments ==
- Mid Atlantic Championship Wrestling
  - NWA Mid-Atlantic Tag Team Championship (1 time) – with David Flair
- National Wrestling Alliance
  - The Anderson Brothers Classic 4 Tournament – with George South Jr.
- NWA Charlotte
  - NWA Mid-Atlantic Heritage Championship (1 time)^{[1]}
- Xtreme World Wrestling
  - XWW United States Heavyweight Championship (2 times)

^{1} At the conclusion of a match on April 11, 2009, Flair was handed the championship. At the following show, the former champion Jeff Lewis was announced as the current champion, with no explanation given.

== Filmography ==
- The Dooley and Pals Show

== See also ==
- List of premature professional wrestling deaths
