= The Illuminator Art Collective =

Collective of artists and activists

The Illuminator
- The Illuminator van in New York City, 2012.
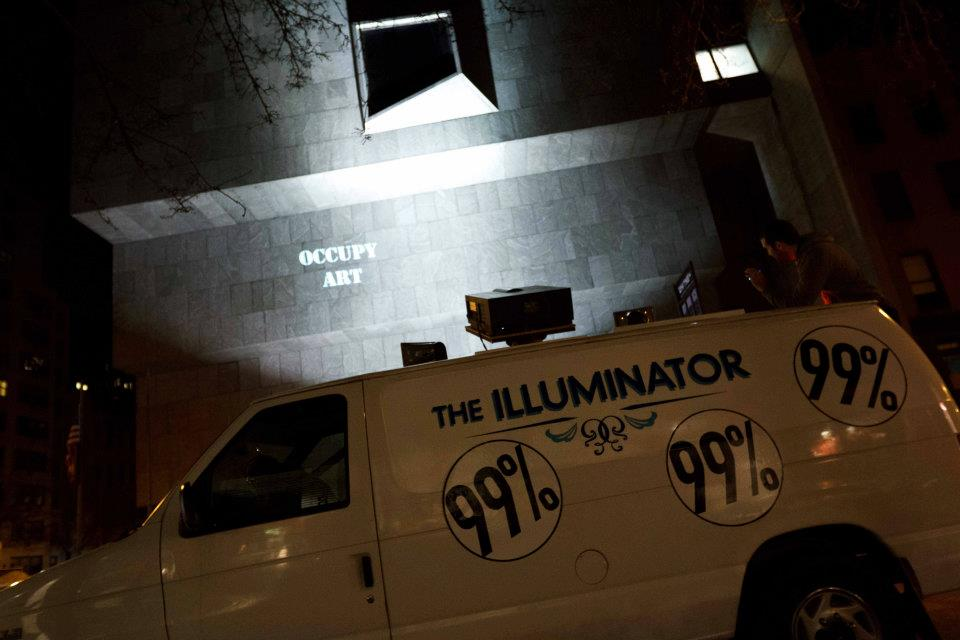
- The Illuminator is an art collective based in New York City and founded during the Occupy Wall Street movement.

The Illuminator Art Collective was conceived of during the Occupy Wall Street movement in New York City in 2011. Given an initial monetary grant from Ben Cohen of Ben & Jerry's, the group purchased and retrofit a Ford cargo van to hold and maneuver a 12,000-lumen projector. The collective typically uses the van to aid existing political movements and has worked with large political organizations such as Greenpeace but typically assists grassroots movements in and around New York City. Their work has been covered by the U.S. East Coast and the British media.

== Mission statement ==
The Illuminator's website states that the goal of their project is "To smash the myths of the information industry and allow people to find out for themselves what the 99% movement is fighting for." On a March 2014 segment on WNYC, members of the collective voiced concerns about late capitalism including political corruption and environmental damage.

== Activity ==
On November 17, 2012 The Illuminator projected the iconic 99% logo onto the Verizon Building in Lower Manhattan as its first mission. It was meant to inspire protestors after they were evicted from Zuccotti Park and marched across the Brooklyn Bridge in clear view of the building.

The group also received attention for its projections on April 15, 2013 which consisted of messages of "solidarity" with the people of Boston after the Boston Marathon bombing. The projections were seen on the Brooklyn Academy of Music.

In April 2015, after an unsanctioned statue of Edward Snowden in Brooklyn's Fort Greene Park was taken down by the NYPD, the Illuminator put up a temporary "holographic" statue in its place.

On December 13, 2020, the Illuminator projected onto a TF Cornerstone building in Long Island City. The projections call attention to the current city housing crisis, and "to visualize demands for a more just future".

== Legal troubles ==
At least three members of the project have been taken in for questioning by the NYPD on more than one occasion. On February 8, 2013, an Illuminator was arrested after projecting a ballot box stuffed with dollar bills onto Mayor Michael Bloomberg's apartment in Manhattan. Two members, Kyle Depew and Grayson Earle were also arrested and charged with illegal advertising on September 9, 2014 after projecting onto the Metropolitan Museum of Art. The museum had accepted a $60 million donation from billionaire David Koch, an avid climate change denier. During the dinner party for the event, the group projected "Koch = Climate Chaos" onto the museum. They were arrested and detained overnight, though the charges were dropped soon after.

== See also ==
- Autonomedia
- Electronic Disturbance Theatre
- Institute for Applied Autonomy
- Tactical media
