= Charlotte Flair =

American professional wrestler (born 1986)

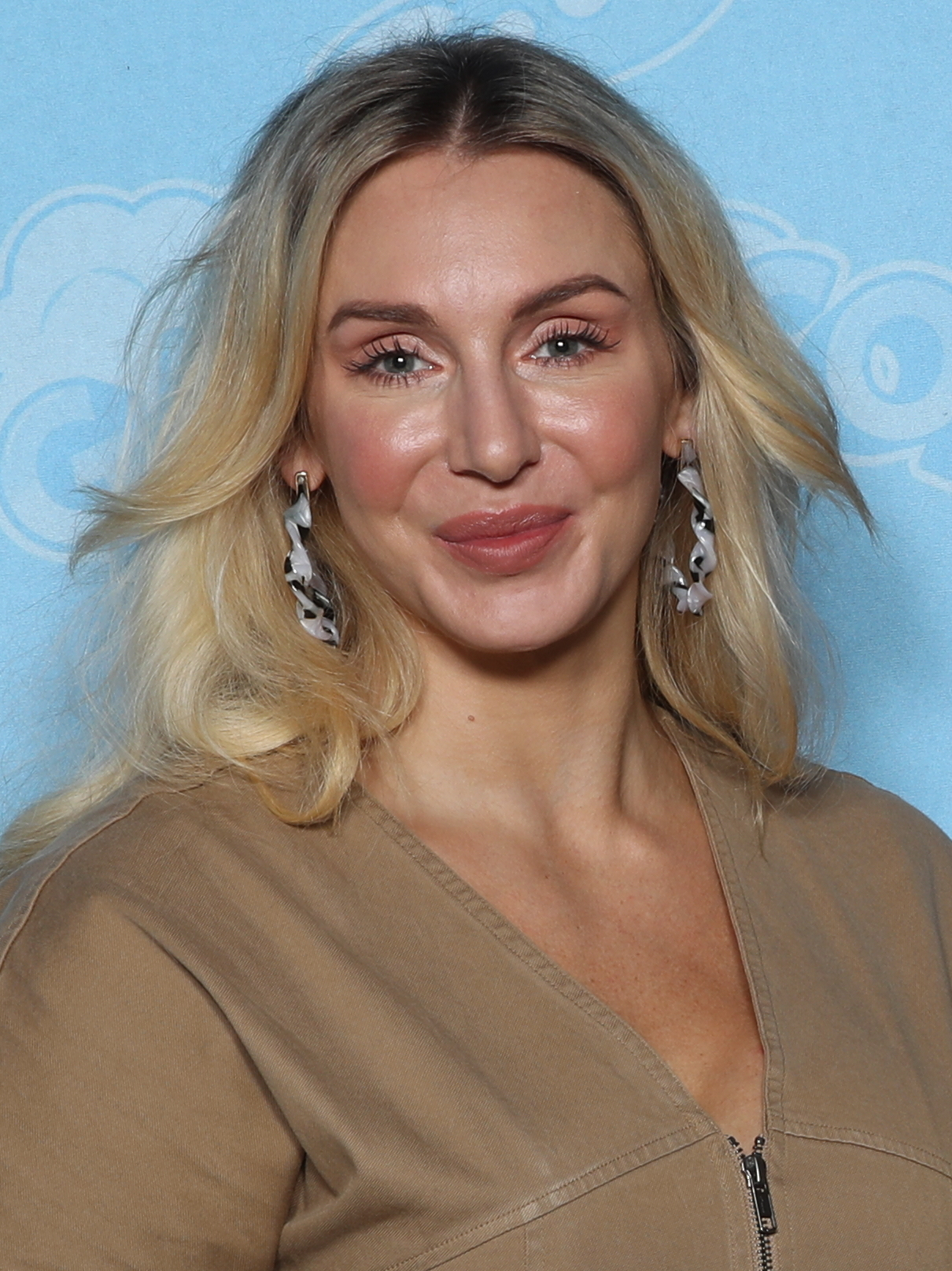
- Flair in 2019
- Born: Ashley Elizabeth Fliehr; April 5, 1986 (age 40); Charlotte, North Carolina, U.S.
- Education: North Carolina State University (BS)
- Occupation: Professional wrestler
- Years active: 2000–present
- Spouses: Riki Johnson (m. 2010; div. 2013); Thom Latimer (m. 2013; div. 2015); Manuel Andrade (m. 2022; div. 2024)
- Father: Ric Flair
- Relatives: Reid Flair (brother); David Flair (half-brother); Conrad Thompson (brother in-law)
- Professional wrestling career
- Ring name(s): Ashley Flair; Charlotte; Charlotte Flair
- Billed height: 5 ft 10 in (178 cm)
- Billed from: "The Queen City"
- Trained by: Lodi; Sara Del Rey; Ric Flair
- Debut: July 17, 2012

Ashley Elizabeth Fliehr (born April 5, 1986) is an American professional wrestler. She is signed to WWE, where she performs on the SmackDown brand under the ring name Charlotte Flair, and is a record 14-time world champion.

Flair is a second-generation professional wrestler, being the daughter of Ric Flair. She made her first appearance in professional wrestling alongside her father in World Championship Wrestling in 1993. In 2012, she began training with WWE, and debuted in NXT the following year. In 2014, she was named Rookie of the Year by Pro Wrestling Illustrated (PWI), and was promoted to WWE's main roster in 2015. In 2016, PWI readers voted Flair Woman of the Year and Top Female Professional Wrestler.

Flair is a 14-time world champion, having held the WWE Divas Championship once, of which she was the final holder, the WWE (Raw) Women's Championship a record six times, of which she was the inaugural holder, and the SmackDown Women's Championship a record seven times, with the latter now known as the Women's World Championship. She has also held the NXT Women's Championship twice and the WWE Women's Tag Team Championship twice. Flair also won the Royal Rumble match in 2020 and 2025, becoming the first woman to win multiple Royal Rumble matches. In October 2016, she became the first woman (alongside Sasha Banks) to headline a WWE pay-per-view event. Her match with Becky Lynch and Ronda Rousey at 2019's WrestleMania 35 was the first time that a women's match had headlined WWE's flagship event.

== Early life ==
Ashley Elizabeth Fliehr was born in Charlotte, North Carolina, on April 5, 1986, to Ric Flair and his then-wife Elizabeth Harrell. She has an older half-sister, Megan, and an older half-brother, David, while her younger brother Reid died on March 29, 2013. Fliehr attended Providence High School in Charlotte, where she won two North Carolina 4A state championships in volleyball, being the team captain and player of the year in 2004 and 2005.

She attended Appalachian State University in Boone, North Carolina, playing volleyball in the 2005 and 2006 seasons before transferring to North Carolina State University, where she graduated with a Bachelor of Science in public relations in Spring 2008 while also being a certified personal trainer prior to becoming a wrestler.

Flair was at ringside for the December 6, 2004, episode of Raw in her hometown of Charlotte, North Carolina, where Lita and Trish Stratus competed in the main event for the WWE Women's Championship. Almost 12 years later, on October 3, 2016, Flair herself and rival Sasha Banks would do the same, marking the third time a Women's Championship match main-evented Raw.

== Professional wrestling career ==
=== World Championship Wrestling (1993, 2000) ===
Flair made her first appearance in professional wrestling at the age of seven, appearing in a vignette with her father at the World Championship Wrestling (WCW) pay-per-view Starrcade '93: 10th Anniversary.

In 2000, at the age of 14, Flair again appeared alongside her father in WCW as part of his feud with Vince Russo and her half-brother David. On the May 15 episode of Monday Nitro, Flair appeared in a vignette in which Russo, David and Daffney invaded the Flair family home until being confronted by Flair, her mother Beth, and her brother Reid. At The Great American Bash on June 11, Flair was at ringside for a retirement match between Ric and David. After Russo attempted to interfere in the match on David's behalf, she and her brother Reid attacked him and handcuffed him, enabling their father to go on to defeat David. On the following evening's episode of Monday Nitro, David and Russo faced Ric in a handicap match with the Flair family once again at ringside. Flair attempted to interfere on her father's behalf, but was restrained by R&B Security, Russo's henchmen, allowing David and Russo to defeat Ric and partially shave his head.

=== WWE ===
==== Early years in NXT (2012–2014) ====
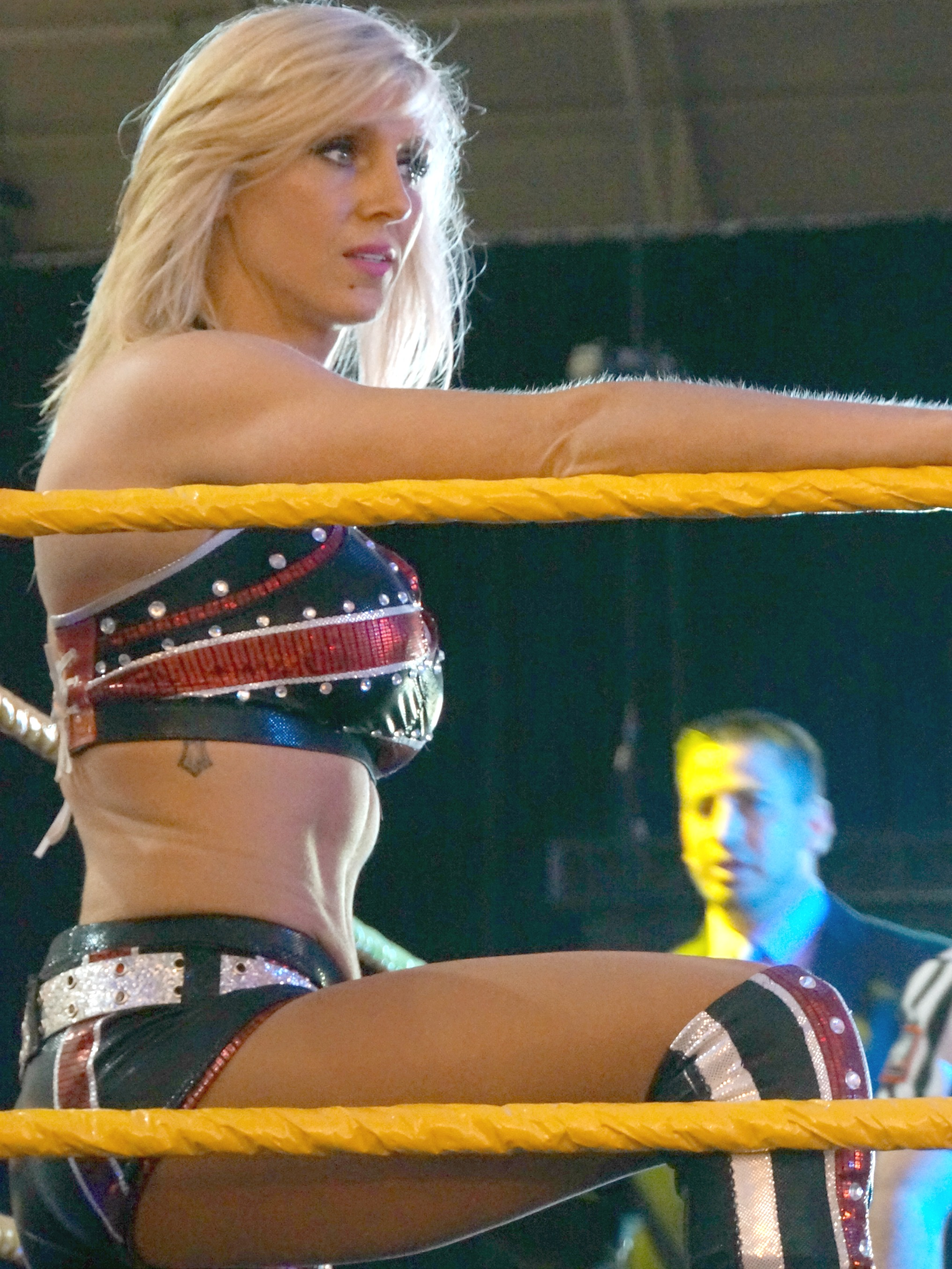
Charlotte in April 2014

On May 17, 2012, she signed a developmental contract with WWE and trained under Lodi in North Carolina before joining NXT, the WWE developmental territory, in Tampa, Florida. Her trainers in NXT included Sara Del Rey. Fliehr adopted the ring name Charlotte and had her first televised singles match on the July 17, 2013, episode of NXT, where she defeated Bayley. In late 2013, Flair formed a tag team with Bayley, and the two defeated Aksana and Alicia Fox on the September 4 episode of NXT. On the October 10 episode of NXT, Bayley accompanied Charlotte to a match against Santana Garrett, which she won, but during the match The BFFs—Beautiful, Fierce Females (Sasha Banks and Summer Rae) came to the ring and attempted to convince Bayley to join them, much to Charlotte's annoyance.

On the November 13 episode of NXT, Flair attacked Bayley and joined the BFFs, establishing herself as a heel in the process. After a two-month absence due to a legit injury, Flair returned on the January 22, 2014, episode of NXT and began accompanying Rae and Banks to their matches. In February, Charlotte confronted and challenged NXT Women's Champion Paige during an interview with Renee Young. Following Rae's elevation to WWE's main roster, Flair and Banks feuded with Bayley, who formed an alliance with Natalya, who defeated Charlotte by disqualification after Banks interfered on the March 27 episode of NXT. On April 6 at WrestleMania XXX, she appeared alongside Sasha Banks and Alexa Bliss in Triple H's entrance in his match against Daniel Bryan. The feud between Charlotte and Paige ended on the April 24 episode of NXT, when Flair and Banks defeated Emma and Paige, with Charlotte scoring the pinfall over Paige.

==== NXT Women's Champion (2014–2015) ====
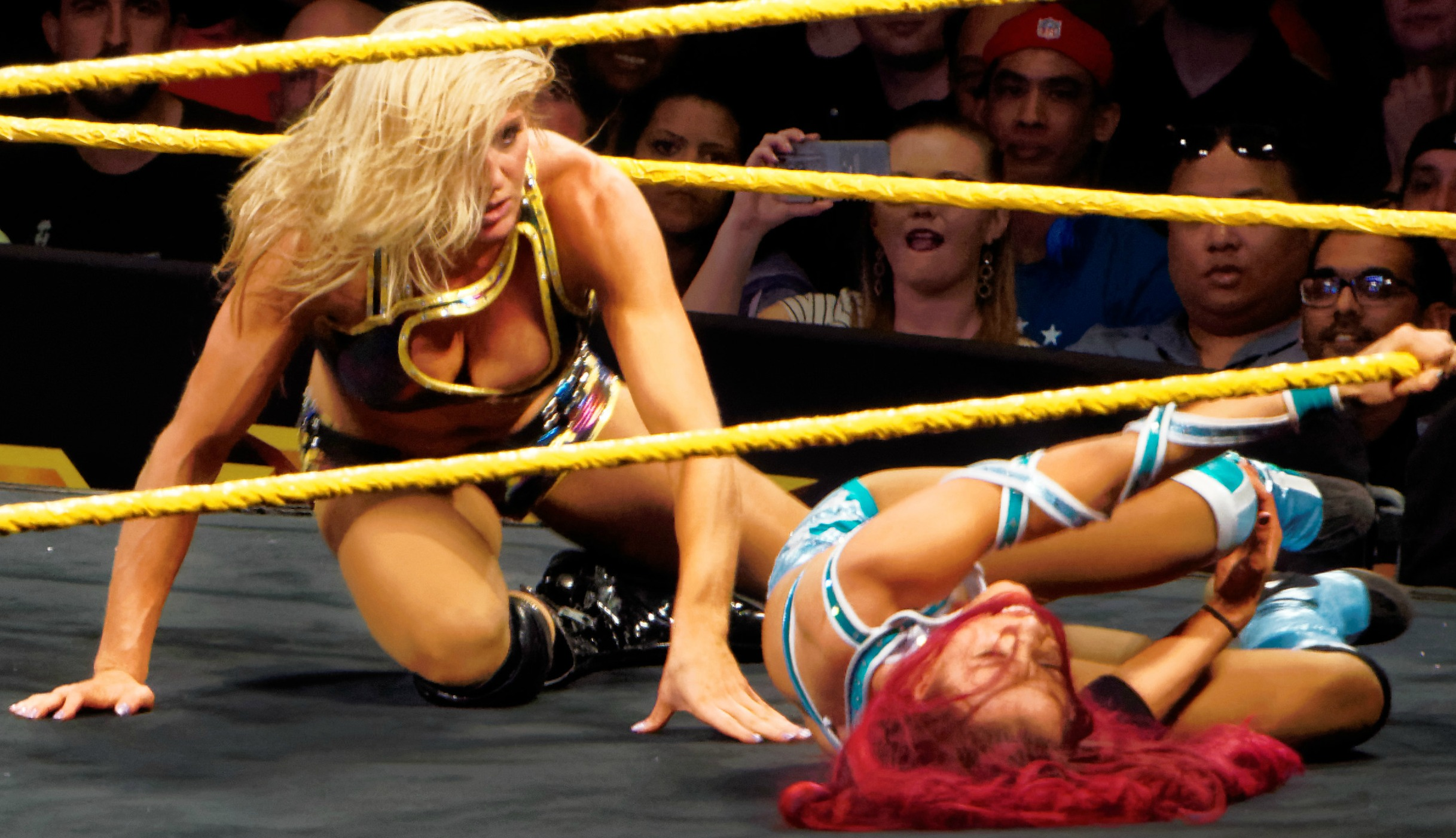
Charlotte wrestling Sasha Banks during a house show

The following month, Flair competed in an eight-woman tournament for the vacant NXT Women's Championship, defeating Emma in the first round, Alexa Bliss in the semi-finals and Natalya in the finals at TakeOver on May 29 to win the NXT Women's Championship for the first time in her career, her first championship in WWE. After a four-month absence from the show, Summer Rae returned on the June 6 episode of NXT, distracting Bayley and allowing Flair to defeat her, after which the BFFs attempted to attack Bayley, only to be chased away by Emma and the returning Paige. The altercation prompted a six-woman tag team match on the June 12 episode of NXT, which the BFFs lost after Bayley pinned Flair. On the July 3 episode of NXT, Flair got a measure of retribution over Bayley in a tag team match, where she and Sasha Banks defeated Bayley and Becky Lynch. After the match, Charlotte left Banks to get attacked by Bayley, with Banks officially disbanding the BFFs in a backstage segment later that night.

On the July 24 episode of NXT, Flair retained the women's championship against Summer Rae. Flair then went on to retain against Bayley at TakeOver: Fatal 4-Way on September 11, after which she stopped Banks from attacking Bayley afterwards, and after defeating Bayley in a rematch on October 2 episode of NXT, she raised Bayley's arm before they shared a hug and shook hands, turning Flair back into a fan favorite character. Following this, Flair and Bayley feuded with Banks and her partner Becky Lynch throughout the following several weeks. Flair made her first appearance on WWE's main roster on the Slammy Awards special episode of Raw on December 8, where she lost to Natalya in a non-title match. Charlotte retained the NXT Women's Championship against Banks at TakeOver: R Evolution on December 11, and in rematches that took place on the December 25 and the January 21, 2015, episodes of NXT, respectively. At TakeOver: Rival on February 11, Flair dropped the championship to Banks in a fatal four-way match that also involved Bayley and Becky Lynch, ending her reign at 258 days. She failed to regain the championship in a rematch against Banks that took place on the March 4 episode of NXT.

At TakeOver: Unstoppable on May 20, Charlotte teamed up with Bayley to defeat Emma and Dana Brooke. After defeating Emma and Brooke again on the July 8 episode of NXT, this time teaming with her rival Sasha Banks, Flair challenged Banks to an NXT Women's Championship match, which Banks accepted. They had their championship match the following week on the July 15 episode of NXT, in which Banks retained the championship, and afterwards the two shared a hug and Banks raised Flair's hand as a sign of respect.

==== Divas Champion (2015–2016) ====
On the July 13, 2015, episode of Raw, Stephanie McMahon called for a "revolution" in the Divas division, subsequently introducing Flair, Becky Lynch, and Sasha Banks as members of the main roster. Flair and Lynch allied with Paige, who was engaged in a feud with Team Bella (Alicia Fox and The Bella Twins), while Banks allied with Tamina and Naomi, starting a rivalry between the three teams. The trio of Charlotte, Lynch, and Paige was dubbed Team PCB after the first name initials of each wrestler. On July 19 at Battleground, Charlotte defeated Banks and Brie Bella in a triple threat match in her WWE pay-per-view debut. The three teams faced off at SummerSlam on August 23 in a three team elimination match, which Flair's team won after Lynch pinned Brie Bella.

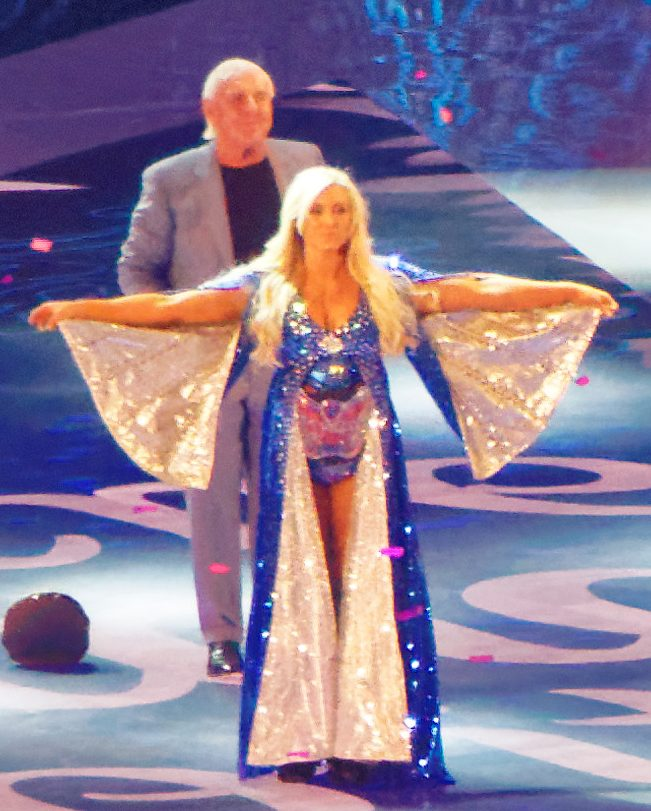
Flair being accompanied by her father at WrestleMania 32, shown wearing the WWE Divas Championship in its last televised appearance as it was retired and replaced by the WWE Women's Championship during the event's pre-show

On the August 31 episode of Raw, Flair overcame fellow Team PCB members' records in the first ever Divas Beat the Clock Challenge, and was named the new number one contender to Nikki Bella's Divas Championship. Her title match against Nikki Bella, initially advertised for Night of Champions, took place on the September 14 episode of Raw, so Flair could stop Bella from surpassing AJ Lee's record and becoming the longest-reigning Divas Champion. Charlotte won the match by disqualification after she pinned Brie due to the twins switching places, causing Nikki to retain her title and beat the record in the process. On September 20 at Night of Champions, Charlotte defeated Nikki in a rematch to win the Divas Championship for the first time. During Charlotte's celebration the following night on Raw, Paige cut a worked shoot promo and turned on her and Lynch, berating them and the Divas division. Paige acted as if she wanted to reconcile with Lynch and Flair, only to attack them both and cement her departure from the team the night after Flair retained her championship against Nikki Bella at Hell in a Cell on October 25. Charlotte then retained her title against Paige on three occasions—at Survivor Series on November 22, in a rematch the following night on Raw and at TLC: Tables, Ladders & Chairs on December 13.

In November, Flair began displaying villainous traits after defeating her friend Becky Lynch by feigning a leg injury, followed by a distraction provided by her father. Throughout December, the relationship between Charlotte and Lynch continued to strain, and after losing to her on the January 4, 2016, episode Raw, Flair attacked Lynch and solidified her villainous turn in the process for the first time since 2014 in NXT. Charlotte retained the Divas Championship against Lynch with help from her father three days later on SmackDown, and at the Royal Rumble on January 24. In February, after she lost to her in a non–title match, Brie Bella received a title match at Fastlane on February 21, where Charlotte once again retained her title. A few weeks later, on March 12 at Roadblock, Flair retained the title against Natalya. Also in March, Charlotte caused a number one contender's match between Lynch and Banks to end in a no contest after she attacked both contenders. As a result, a triple threat match between Flair, Banks and Lynch for the Divas Championship was scheduled for WrestleMania 32. At the event on April 3, a new WWE Women's Championship replaced the Divas Championship and Charlotte defeated Banks and Lynch to become the inaugural champion.

==== Raw Women's Champion (2016–2017) ====
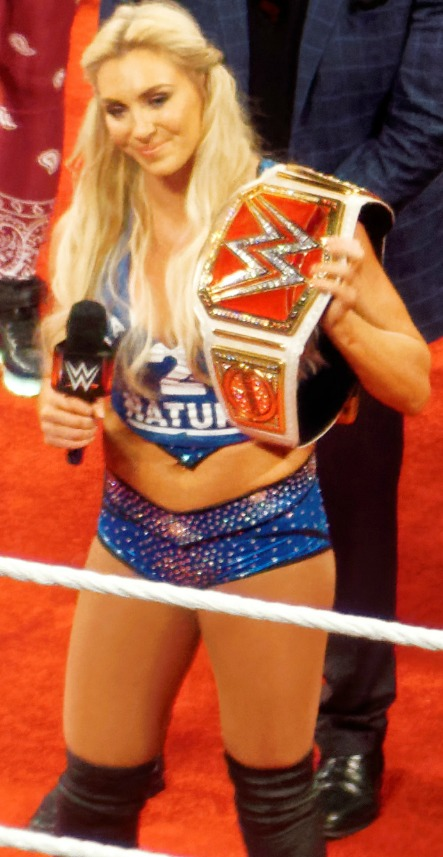
Flair with the WWE Women's Championship the night after WrestleMania 32 on Raw in April 2016; the title was renamed to Raw Women's Championship in September that year

Following WrestleMania 32, Flair began a feud with Natalya, successfully defending the title against her on the April 11, 2016, episode of Raw. Due to the disqualification ending, a rematch took place at Payback on May 1, where she defeated Natalya after referee Charles Robinson ended the match as Flair held Natalya in the sharpshooter, even though Natalya had not submitted, in a reference to the infamous "shoot screwjob" the Montreal Screwjob. After the match, both Natalya and Bret Hart, who was in Natalya's corner, applied the Sharpshooter on Charlotte and Ric Flair. At Extreme Rules on May 22, Charlotte retained her title against Natalya in a submission match after a distraction provided by Dana Brooke who was dressed as Flair. The following night on Raw, Flair turned on her father by claiming she no longer needed him, further aligning herself with Brooke who would be dubbed as her protege. At Money in the Bank on June 19, Flair and Brooke defeated Natalya and Lynch in a tag team match. On the June 20 episode of Raw, Flair retained her title over Paige with help of Brooke, with the two attacking Paige after the match, which ended with Banks making the save. This led to a tag team match the following week, where Banks and Paige scored the victory. On July 24 at Battleground, Charlotte and Brooke were defeated by Banks and the debuting Bayley.

After being drafted to the Raw brand as part of the 2016 WWE draft on July 19, Flair made her first appearance for the brand on the July 25 episode of Raw, where she lost the WWE Women's Championship to Sasha Banks, ending her reign at 113 days. On August 21 at SummerSlam, Flair competed against Banks in a rematch for the title, in which Flair was victorious, becoming a two-time champion. At Clash of Champions on September 25, Flair retained the title (which had been renamed Raw Women's Championship after the creation of the SmackDown Women's Championship) in a triple threat match against Banks and Bayley. However, Flair dropped the title to Banks once again in the main event of the October 3 episode of Raw. Around this time, Flair's ring name was lengthened to Charlotte Flair.

At Hell in a Cell on October 30, Flair regained the title from Banks in the first ever women's Hell in a Cell match to become a three-time women's champion. This was also the first time a women's match was the last match on a WWE pay-per-view. The following night on Raw, Flair was revealed as captain of Team Raw for Survivor Series on November 20, where Team Raw defeated Team SmackDown with Flair and Bayley being the survivors for Team Raw. On the November 28 episode of Raw, Flair competed against Banks in a falls count anywhere match, where Banks defeated Flair for the title, after which Ric Flair came out and celebrated with Banks. A 30-minute iron man match between the two was scheduled for Roadblock: End of the Line on December 18, which resulted in a 2–2 draw, but Flair defeated Banks 3–2 in sudden death overtime, becoming a record four-time Raw Women's Champion, as well as ending their six-month feud since it was stipulated that Banks could not invoke her rematch clause after that. Shortly after, Flair started a feud with Bayley who managed to defeat her in two non-title matches since her main roster debut in August. This led to a title match between the two that took place at the Royal Rumble on January 29, 2017, where Flair retained the title over Bayley.

On the February 13 episode of Raw, Flair dropped the title to Bayley in the main event. She later failed to regain the title in a rematch against Bayley at Fastlane on March 5, marking her first pay-per-view singles match loss after 16 singles victories. Also in March, Flair ended her association with Brooke and defeated her in a singles match. At WrestleMania 33 on April 2, Flair competed in a four-way elimination match against Bayley, Banks, and Nia Jax, being the last woman eliminated by eventual winner Bayley. On the April 10 episode of Raw, Flair was defeated by Jax in her final match for the brand.

==== SmackDown Women's Champion (2017–2018) ====
On April 11, 2017, Flair was moved to SmackDown brand as part of the Superstar Shake-up. The following week on SmackDown Live, she defeated SmackDown Women's Champion Naomi in a non-title match, to earn a title opportunity, which ended in a no-contest after The Welcoming Committee (Natalya, Carmella, and Tamina) attacked both contestants. This match made Flair the first woman in WWE history to ever compete in the main events of Raw, SmackDown and a WWE pay-per-view. On May 2, 2017, on Smackdown, Flair aligned with Becky Lynch and Naomi against The Welcoming Committee, turning face in the process. At Backlash on May 21, The Welcoming Committee defeated Flair, Naomi and Lynch in a six-woman tag team match when the latter submitted to Natalya's sharpshooter. Shortly afterwards, Flair competed at Money in the Bank, as part of the first ever women's money in the bank ladder match, which was won by Carmella. At Battleground on July 23, Flair competed in a five-way elimination match to determine the number one contender for the championship but was the last woman eliminated by eventual winner Natalya.

After taking a hiatus to assist her father in his legit health issues, Flair returned to SmackDown on September 19, thanking the WWE Universe for her family's support. Later that night, she won a fatal four-way match to become the number one contender for the SmackDown Women's Championship. At Hell in a Cell on October 8, Natalya retained her title over Flair as she attacked her with a steel chair, causing a disqualification victory for Flair. On the November 14 episode of SmackDown, Flair defeated Natalya in a rematch to win the title in her hometown, becoming the first woman's wrestler to win the Divas, NXT, Raw and SmackDown Women's Championship. With the win, Flair replaced Natalya in the interbrand champion vs. champion match against Raw Women's Champion Alexa Bliss at Survivor Series on November 19, which Flair won. A month later, at Clash of Champions on December 17, Flair retained the title against Natalya in a lumberjack match.

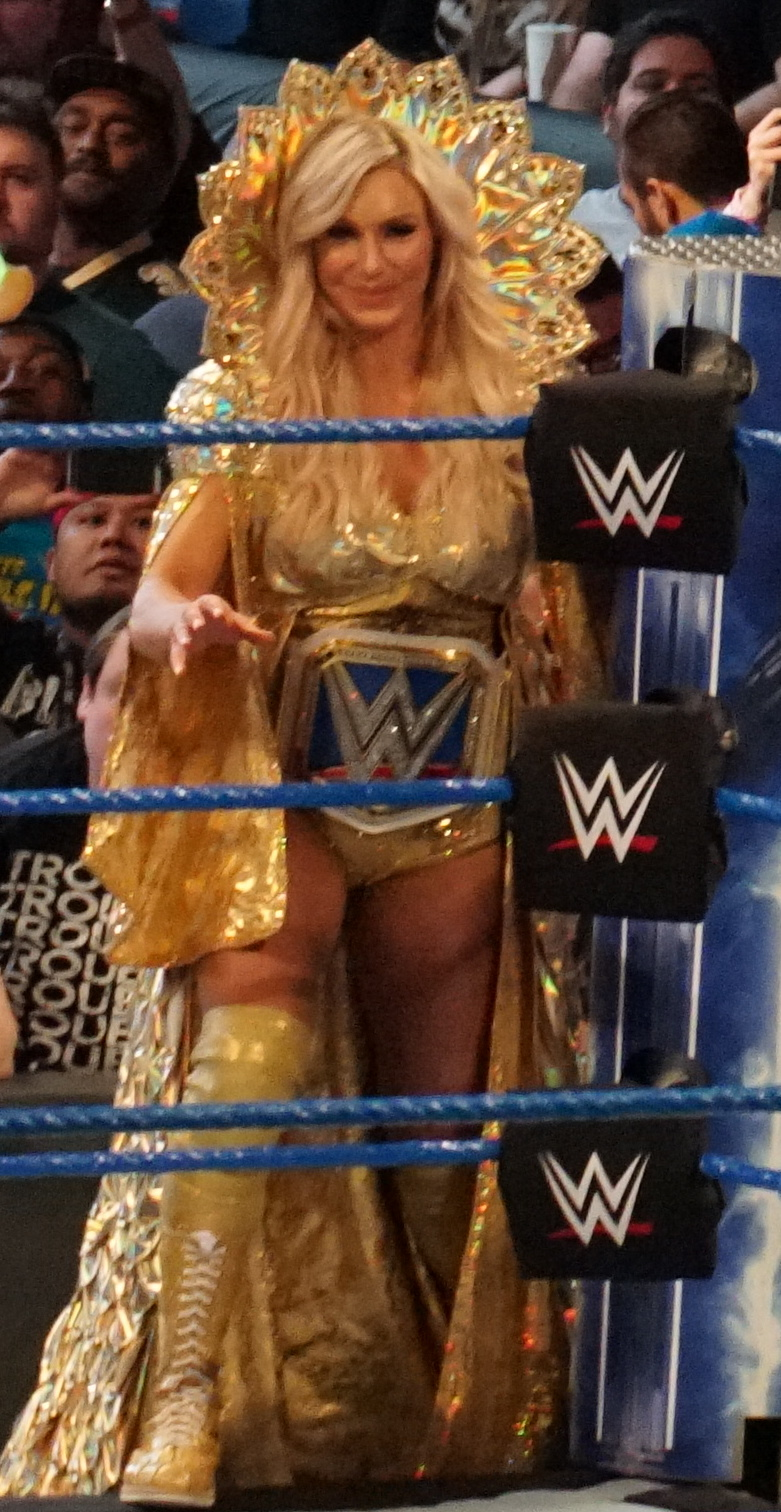
Flair as SmackDown Women's Champion in 2018

Towards the end of 2017, Flair once again aligned with Becky Lynch and Naomi to feud with the debuting Riott Squad (Ruby Riott, Liv Morgan, and Sarah Logan), after the three attacked them shortly after their debut. At Fastlane on March 11, 2018, Flair defeated Ruby Riott to retain the SmackDown Women's Championship and was subsequently challenged by Royal Rumble winner Asuka. Flair won the ensuing title match at WrestleMania 34 on April 8 by making Asuka submit, ending the challenger's undefeated streak at 914 days in the process. Two days later, on the April 10 episode of SmackDown, The IIconics (Peyton Royce and Billie Kay) attacked Flair. Carmella used the opportunity to cash in her Money in the Bank contract and won the championship for the first time in her career. It was later revealed that soon after her Wrestlemania title win, Flair became seriously ill after getting silicone poisoning which resulted from her breast implants leaking. Flair failed to regain the title in a rematch on May 6 at Backlash. Flair competed in her second Money in the Bank ladder match on June 17, which was ultimately won by Alexa Bliss.

On the July 31 episode of SmackDown, Flair saved Becky Lynch from an attack by Carmella. She later defeated Carmella to be inserted into the championship match between Carmella and Lynch at SummerSlam, making it a triple threat match. At the event on August 19, Flair pinned Lynch to win the SmackDown Women's Championship for a second time in her career. With the win, Flair became the second woman in WWE history to hold seven women's championships, alongside WWE Hall of Famer Trish Stratus. After the match, Lynch attacked Flair, igniting a feud between the two, which led to a match at Hell in a Cell on September 16, in which Flair lost the title to Lynch. Flair defeated Lynch via disqualification at Super Show-Down on October 6 and fought her in a rematch two days later on SmackDown, which ended in a double count-out. As a result of this, Flair received another title opportunity against Lynch in the first Last Woman Standing match at Evolution on October 28, in which Lynch defeated Flair.

==== Championship reigns (2018–2020) ====
Flair was picked by Becky Lynch as her replacement in a match against Raw Women's Champion Ronda Rousey at Survivor Series on November 18, which she lost via disqualification after brutally attacking Rousey with a kendo stick and a chair, turning heel in the process. The following month, on December 16 at the TLC pay-per-view, Flair competed in the first ever women's Tables, Ladders, and Chairs match against both Lynch and Asuka, who would go on to win the match after Rousey pushed both Flair and Lynch off a ladder.

At Royal Rumble on January 27, Flair competed in the women's Royal Rumble match, eliminating five women, before being last eliminated by Becky Lynch. As a result, Lynch earned a title match against Raw Women's Champion Ronda Rousey at WrestleMania 35. However, in February, Vince McMahon (kayfabe) suspended Lynch for 60 days and replaced her with Flair. Lynch was soon reinstated, and at Fastlane on March 10, she defeated Flair via disqualification, after Rousey attacked Lynch to give her the win, making the title match at WrestleMania a triple threat match. Just a few days before WrestleMania, on the March 26 episode of SmackDown, Flair defeated Asuka to win the SmackDown Women's Championship for a third time, becoming the only woman in WWE history to have won eight women's championships. At the event on April 7, in what was the first time that women main-evented a WrestleMania event, Flair lost her championship in a Winner Takes All match for both her SmackDown and Ronda Rousey's Raw Women's Championships when Lynch pinned Rousey to win both titles.

Shortly after WrestleMania, Flair continued her feud with Lynch over the SmackDown Women's Championship, stating that she had not been defeated at WrestleMania. She earned a rematch by defeating Bayley and at Money in the Bank on May 19, regained the title by defeating Lynch after interference from Lacey Evans. After the match, the two continued to attack Lynch until Bayley made the save. Bayley, who had won the Money in the Bank contract earlier in the night, cashed in and defeated Flair to end her reign at just 4 minutes and 55 seconds, marking the shortest reign in the title's history. After Money in the Bank, Lynch focused on defending her Raw championship, putting an end to the almost year-long feud between the two.

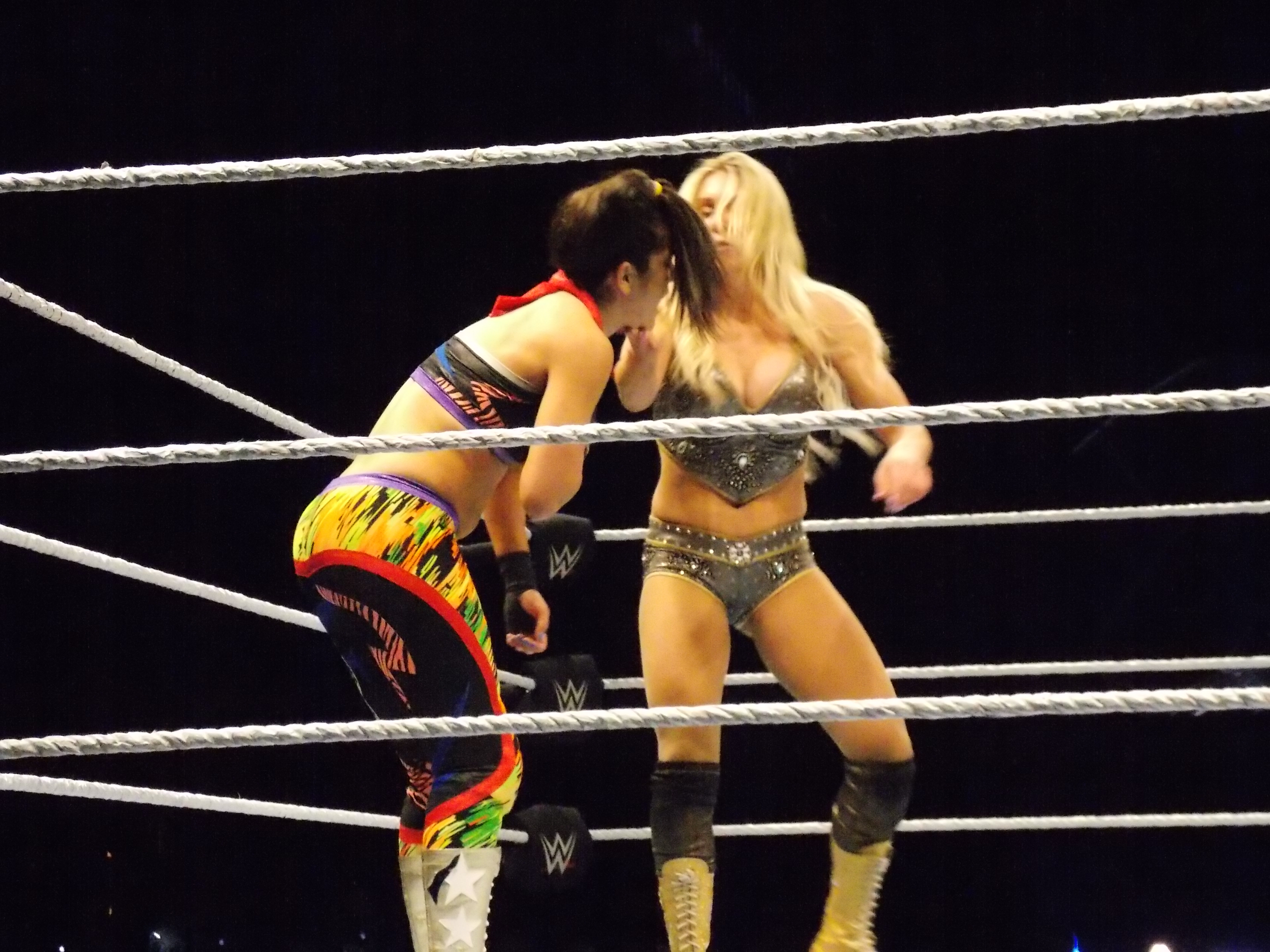
Flair facing Bayley at a live event in 2019

After a brief hiatus, Flair returned on the July 16 episode of SmackDown. She called herself "the greatest female superstar of all time" a week later, and entered into a short storyline with WWE Hall of Famer Trish Stratus. At SummerSlam on August 11, Flair defeated Stratus by submission in what was the latter's second retirement match. After that win, Flair felt that she deserved an opportunity at the SmackDown Women's Championship and re-ignited her feud with Bayley. On September 15, at Clash of Champions, Bayley retained against Flair after she used an exposed turnbuckle. After making Bayley submit during a tag team match, Flair earned herself another title opportunity. At Hell in a Cell on October 6, Flair defeated Bayley to win her record fifth SmackDown Women's Championship, her tenth women's championship on WWE's main roster. Five days later on SmackDown, Flair dropped the title back to Bayley.

As part of the 2019 draft, Flair was drafted to the Raw brand. She was revealed as captain of Team Raw for Survivor Series on November 24, where Team Raw and Team Smackdown lost to Team NXT, after Team Raw member Asuka spit green mist in Flair's face, causing Flair to be eliminated by Lacey Evans. The following night on Raw, Flair lost to Asuka, with some assistance from her tag team partner, Kairi Sane. Flair then joined forces with Becky Lynch to face The Kabuki Warriors (Asuka and Kairi Sane) for the WWE Women's Tag Team Championship in a TLC match at the TLC: Tables, Ladders & Chairs on December 15, but the two were unsuccessful.

On January 26, 2020, at the Royal Rumble pay-per-view, Flair won the annual Royal Rumble match by lastly eliminating Shayna Baszler. After weeks of teasing an announcement regarding her championship opponent at WrestleMania 36, that led to several confrontations with NXT Women's Champion Rhea Ripley on Raw and NXT. At TakeOver: Portland on February 16, Flair attacked Ripley and accepted her challenge. On the second night of WrestleMania 36 on April 5, Flair defeated Ripley by submission to capture her second NXT Women's Championship, which overall marked her 12th women's championship in WWE. At TakeOver: In Your House on June 7, Flair lost the title to Io Shirai in a triple threat match, also involving Rhea Ripley, ending her reign at 63 days. In late June, she was attacked by Nia Jax that led to a kayfabe arm injury. This was done to write Flair off television so she could take some time off to undergo another surgery on her breast implants.

==== Grand Slam Champion and hiatuses (2020–2023) ====
At TLC: Tables, Ladders & Chairs on December 20, Flair returned as a face as the surprise tag team partner of Asuka, with whom she defeated Nia Jax and Shayna Baszler to win the WWE Women's Tag Team Championship. With the win, Flair became the fifth Women's Triple Crown Champion and fourth Women's Grand Slam Champion. Flair then began a feud with Lacey Evans and her father, Ric Flair, who began to interfere in her matches. Flair and Asuka would lose the tag team titles back to Jax and Baszler at the Royal Rumble on January 31, 2021, due to interference from Flair and Evans. On the February 15 episode of Raw, after Lacey Evans announced she was legitimately pregnant, the Raw Women's Championship match between her and Asuka at Elimination Chamber on February 21 was cancelled. On the March 1 episode of Raw, Flair made her intentions to challenge Asuka for the Raw Women's Championship at WrestleMania 37 clear, but that did not happen due to Flair testing positive for COVID-19, removing her from the WrestleMania title picture. Flair returned on the April 12 episode of Raw and interfered in the Raw Women's Championship match between Asuka and Rhea Ripley later that night, turning heel in the process.

Flair would also have several title matches over the next three pay-per-views, including a triple threat match against Asuka and Rhea Ripley at WrestleMania Backlash on May 16 and against Ripley at Hell in a Cell on June 20, which both she was unsuccessful in, but got another opportunity at Money in the Bank on July 18, which she won by submission, making her a record-tying five time Raw Women's Champion. Flair lost the title the next night on Raw to Nikki A.S.H., who cashed her Money in the Bank briefcase, but regained the title at SummerSlam. As a part of the 2021 Draft, Flair was drafted to SmackDown as the Raw Women's Champion. On the October 22 episode of SmackDown, Flair and Lynch exchanged their titles, thus making Flair the SmackDown Women's Champion for the record sixth time. It was then announced that Flair would face Raw Women's Champion Becky Lynch at Survivor Series on November 21, where she was defeated by Lynch. She entered the Women's Royal Rumble match on January 29, 2022, being the last woman eliminated by the returning Ronda Rousey. On the February 4 episode of SmackDown, Rousey chose to challenge Flair for the SmackDown Women's Championship at WrestleMania 38. Flair retained the title against Rousey on the first night of the event on April 2, ending her undefeated singles streak. At WrestleMania Backlash on May 8, Flair lost the championship to Rousey in an "I Quit" match, ending her reign at 198 days. During the match, she (in kayfabe) broke her left arm. After the event, Flair took time off to marry Andrade.

After a seven-month hiatus, Flair returned as a face on the December 30 episode of SmackDown, challenging Ronda Rousey to an impromptu match for the SmackDown Women's Championship. Flair defeated Rousey in under a minute to win the title for a record-setting seventh time. This made her a 14-time women's world champion and marked her 17th championship overall. The following week, Flair retained her title in an open challenge against Sonya Deville. On the February 3 episode of SmackDown, Flair defeated Deville in a rematch to retain her title and end their feud. At WrestleMania 39 Night 1, Flair lost the title to Royal Rumble winner Rhea Ripley, ending her reign at 92 days. On the June 9 episode of SmackDown, Flair returned after a two-month hiatus and challenged Asuka to a match for the WWE Women's Championship, which Asuka accepted. Three weeks later on June 30, the match ended in a disqualification after Bianca Belair attacked both Asuka and Flair.

At SummerSlam on August 5, Flair failed to win the title in a triple threat match after Belair pinned Asuka to regain the title, ending Flair's undefeated SummerSlam streak. At Fastlane, Flair failed to win the title in a triple threat match against Asuka and defending champion Iyo Sky after the referee was distracted by Sky's Damage CTRL stablemate Bayley and did not see Flair forcing Asuka to submit. On the October 20 episode of SmackDown, Flair failed to win the title from Sky after interference from Bayley and Dakota Kai. At Survivor Series: WarGames on November 25, Flair, Belair, Becky Lynch and Shotzi defeated Damage CTRL (Bayley, Sky, Asuka and Kairi Sane) in a WarGames match. On the December 8 episode of SmackDown, Flair suffered a torn ACL, MCL, and meniscus during her match against Asuka. The following week, it was announced that Flair would be out of action for approximately nine months due to the injury, which would result in her missing WrestleMania XL.

==== Partnership with Alexa Bliss (2025–present) ====
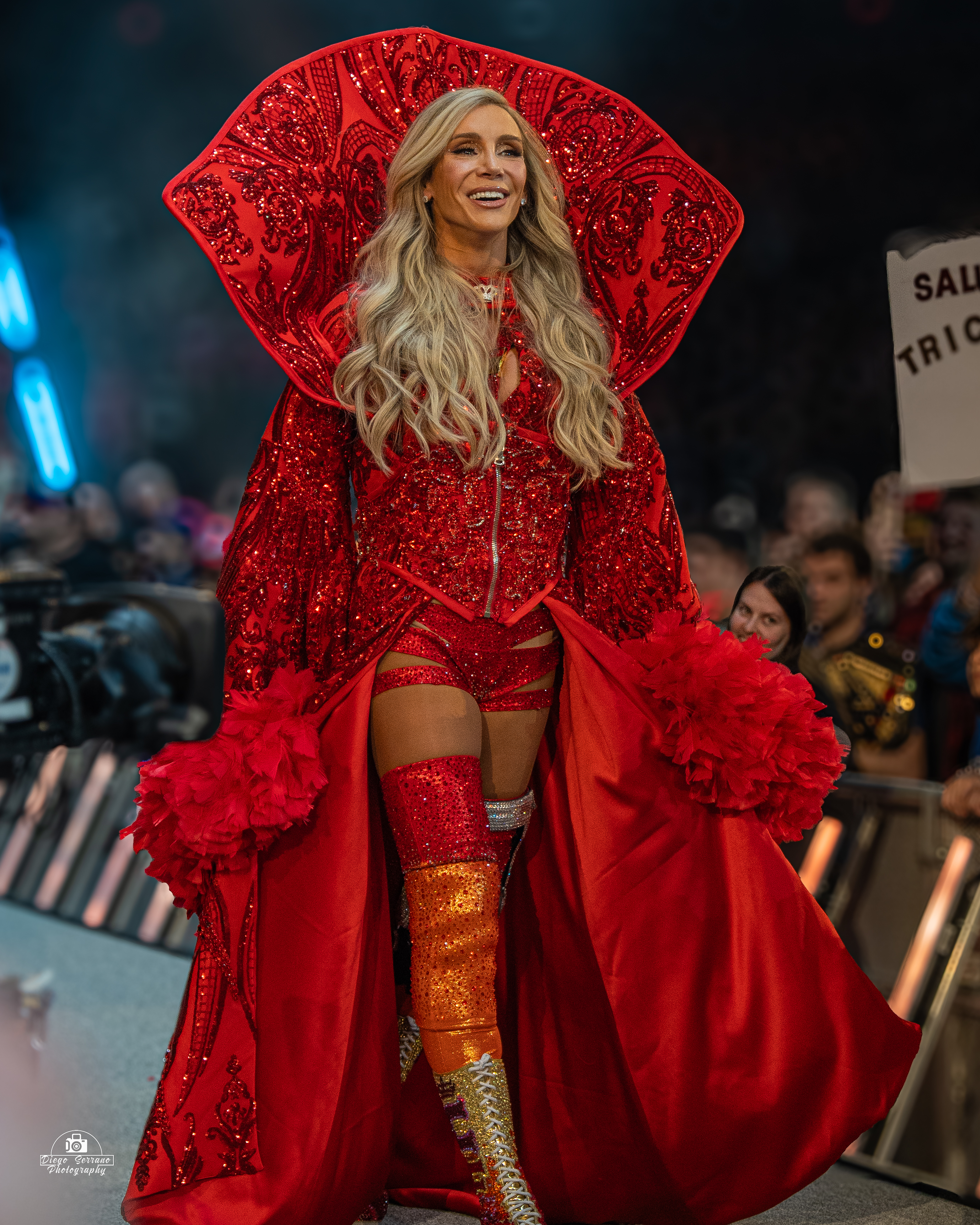
Flair makes her entrance at the 2025 Royal Rumble.

After over a year out of action, Flair returned from injury on February 1, 2025, at the Royal Rumble; entering the women's Royal Rumble match at #27, she won the match for the second time by lastly eliminating Roxanne Perez. With this victory, she became the eleventh person, and first woman, to win the Royal Rumble match more than once. She appeared on Raw, SmackDown and NXT, ultimately choosing to challenge Tiffany Stratton for the WWE Women's Championship at WrestleMania 41. Flair adopted a more aggressive persona, referring to herself as the "Top Girl" and bragging about her family's wrestling legacy, turning heel in the process. On Night 1 of WrestleMania 41 on April 19, Flair failed to win the title from Stratton.

In June, Flair reverted back to a face when she started a storyline with Alexa Bliss, who recommended the two team up. The duo agreed to be "Allies of Convenience." On July 13, at Evolution, Flair and Bliss competed in a fatal four-way tag team match for the WWE Women's Tag Team Championship, but were unsuccessful. At SummerSlam Night 1, on August 2, Flair and Bliss defeated The Judgment Day (Raquel Rodriguez and Roxanne Perez) to win the titles for the first time as a team and Flair's second time individually. Throughout their reign the duo successfully defended the titles against the likes of The Judgement Day, The Culling (Izzi Dame and Tatum Paxley), The Green Regime (Chelsea Green and Alba Fyre), ZaRuca (Zaria and Sol Ruca), and Bayley and Lyra Valkyria. On the November 10 episode of Raw, Flair and Bliss lost the titles to the Kabuki Warriors after interference from Nia Jax and Lash Legend, ending their reign at 100 days. At Survivor Series: WarGames, Flair and Bliss were on the winning side of the WarGames match.

On January 31, 2026, at the Royal Rumble, Flair and Bliss entered the titular match as the first and second entrants. Flair would inadvertently eliminate Bliss while eliminating Jax and last over 59 minutes, before being eliminated by Legend. At Night 1 of WrestleMania 42 on April 18, Flair and Bliss unsuccessfully challenged for the WWE Women’s Tag Team Championship in a fatal four-way match. At Night 2 of SummerSlam on August 2, Flair failed to capture the Interim WWE Women's Championship in a ladder match as it was won by Chelsea Green. At Sunday Night’s Main Event on September 6, Flair, Bliss and new ally Tatum Paxley lost to Jade Cargill, Michin and B-Fab.

== Other media ==
Fliehr appeared in the January 2016 issue of Muscle & Fitness. Fliehr ranked 29th out of 50 in the 2017 Sports Illustrated fittest woman athletes of the year. In June 2018, Fliehr appeared in the ESPN Body 10 magazine.

Fliehr made her video game debut as a playable character in WWE 2K17 and has since appeared in WWE 2K18, WWE 2K19, WWE 2K20, WWE 2K22, WWE 2K Battlegrounds, WWE 2K23, WWE 2K24, WWE 2K25 and WWE 2K26.

Fliehr released Second Nature: The Legacy of Ric Flair and the Rise of Charlotte, co-written with her father and Brian Shields, author of the WWE Encyclopedia.

On December 7, 2017, Fliehr made her film debut on Psych: The Movie, where she played Heather Rockrear, the side kick of the villainous Thin White Duke, portrayed by Zachary Levi. In 2021, Fliehr made a guest appearance on Punky Brewster as her wrestling's persona alongside fellow professional wrestler Alexa Bliss. On March 15, it was announced that Fliehr would star in the remake of Walking Tall, however, further information had yet to be revealed. On May 14, 2024, it was reported that Fliehr was cast in an indie horror filmed named You Lose You Die, where she would portray the character of "Ms. Perfect".

On October 12, 2022, Fliehr collaborated with jewellery brand Rockford Collection, as they released a new line of designer rings named Eminence.

In March 2026, Fliehr made a six-figure angel investment in the mental health advocacy brand Self Care is for Everyone. As part of the deal, she serves as a creative partner and brand champion for the organization.

== Filmography ==
Film
Year	Title	Role	Notes
2017	Psych: The Movie	Heather Rockrear	Film debut
TBA	You Lose You Die †	Ms. Perfect	

Television
Year	Title	Role	Notes
2017	30 for 30	Herself	Season 3, episode 24
2017	Smashing Glass Ceilings	Herself	Episode 1
2018	Carpool Karaoke: The Series	Herself	Season 2, episode 5
2020	Fight Like A Girl	Herself	2 episodes
2019	Straight Up Steve Austin	Herself	Season 2, episode 8
2021	Punky Brewster	Charlotte Flair	Season 1, episode 6

== Personal life ==
On September 5, 2008, in Chapel Hill, North Carolina, Flair was arrested for assaulting a police officer, after a fight involving her then-boyfriend and her father. She pleaded guilty to a lesser charge and was sentenced to 45 days in jail, which was reduced to supervised probation and a $200 fine (equivalent to $299 in 2025).

From May 2010 until February 2013, Flair was married to Riki Johnson. In Second Nature, a joint biography of her and her father released in late 2017, she revealed that she allegedly left Johnson after having been the victim of domestic assault multiple times. In October 2018, Johnson filed a lawsuit against Flair, her father, author Brian Shields, and WWE for "defamatory statements" in the book. From 2013 to October 2015, Flair was married to English wrestler Thomas Latimer, better known as Bram. She began dating Mexican wrestler Manuel Andrade Oropeza, better known as Andrade, in February 2019. The couple got engaged on January 1, 2020, and were married on May 27, 2022, in Mexico. Flair filed for divorce in June 2024, and the divorce was finalized that October.

Flair has multiple tattoos, including two hearts above her waistline, her first husband Riki's name below her waistline, a heart on her left wrist, a quote from the Bible on the left side of her torso that reads "guard your heart above all else, for it will determine the course of your life" (Proverbs 4:23), a cross on the right side of her torso, and a quote on her right forearm reading "a little patience..." from the Guns N' Roses song "Patience". The latter two are tributes to her late brother, Reid.

== Championships and accomplishments ==
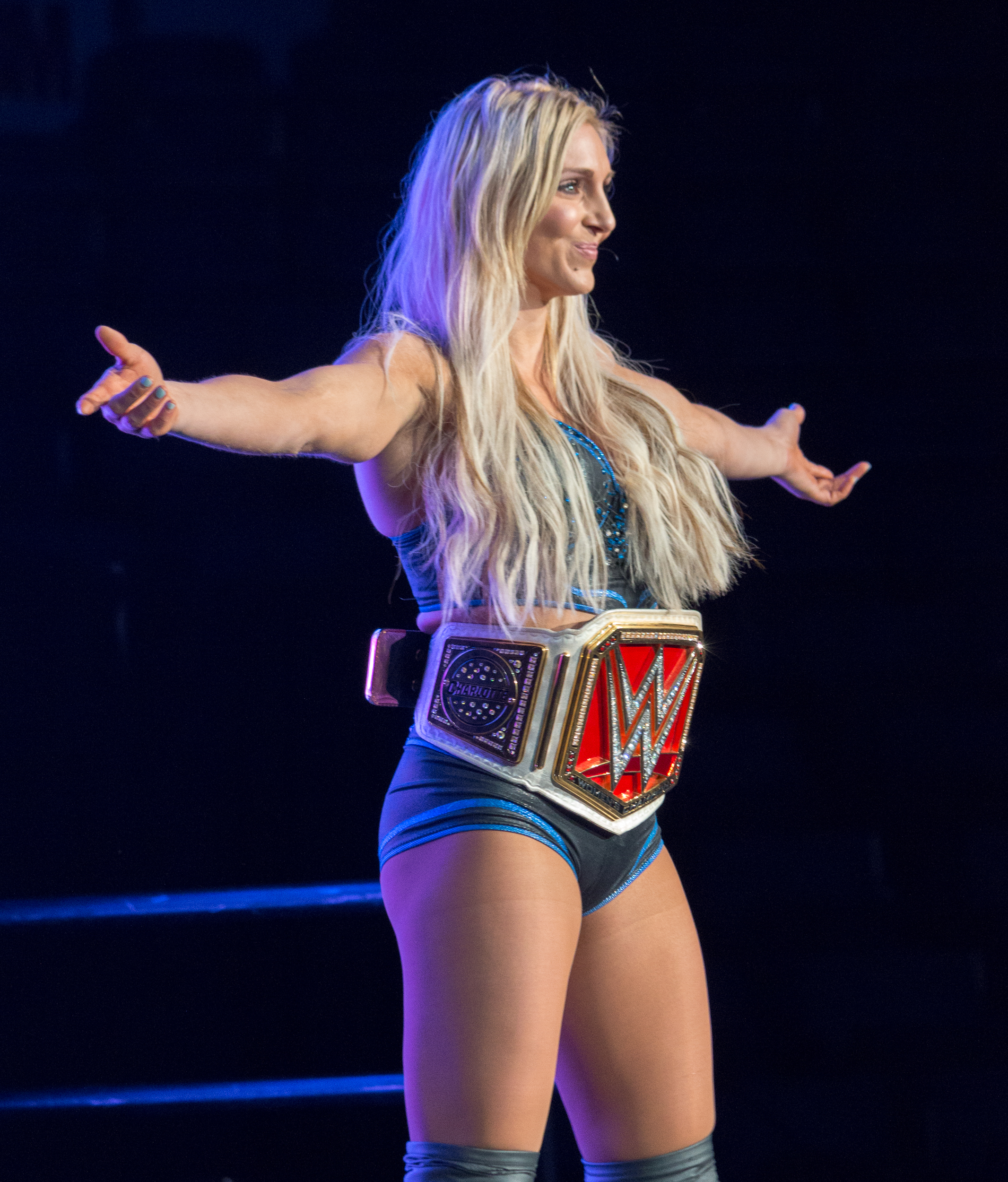
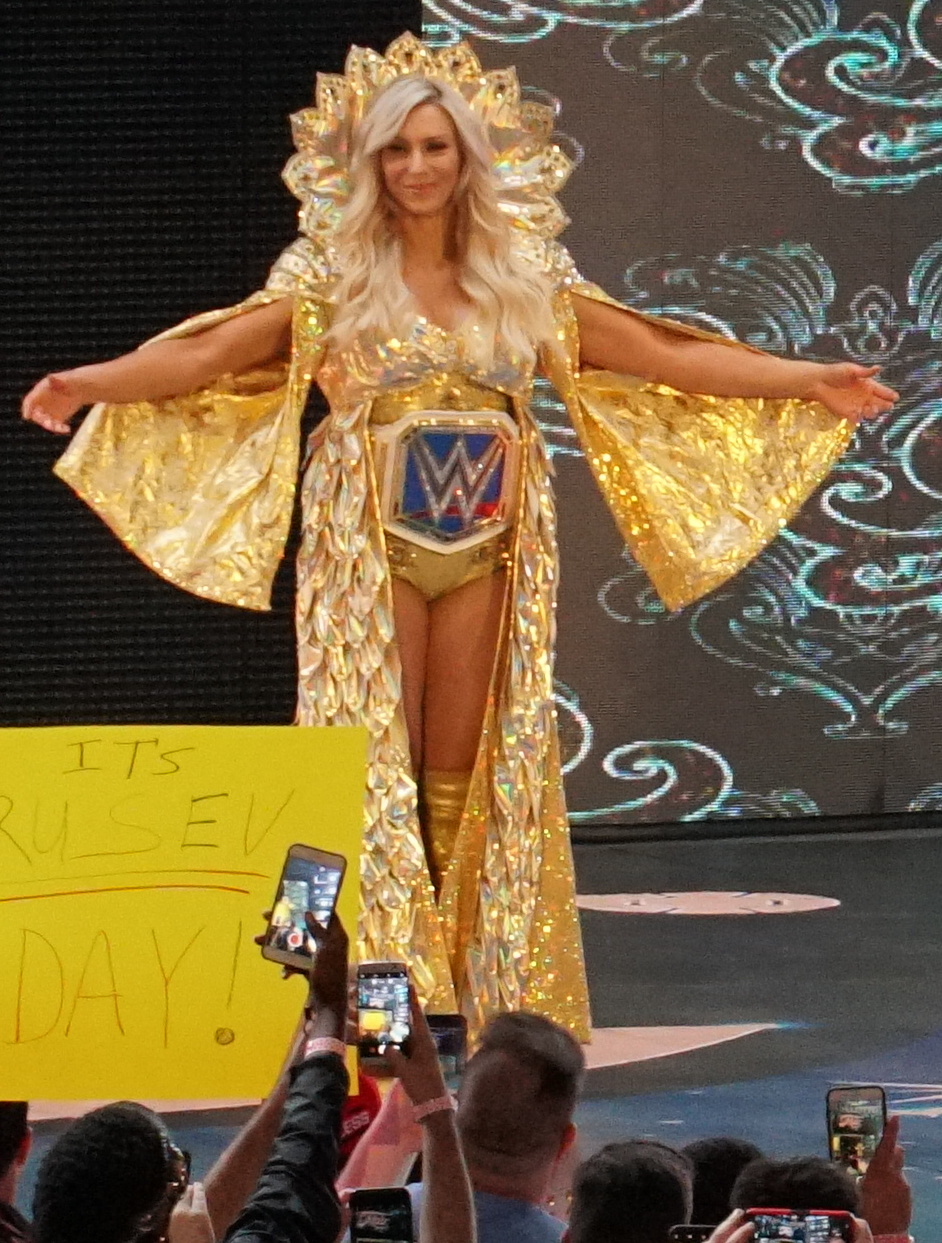
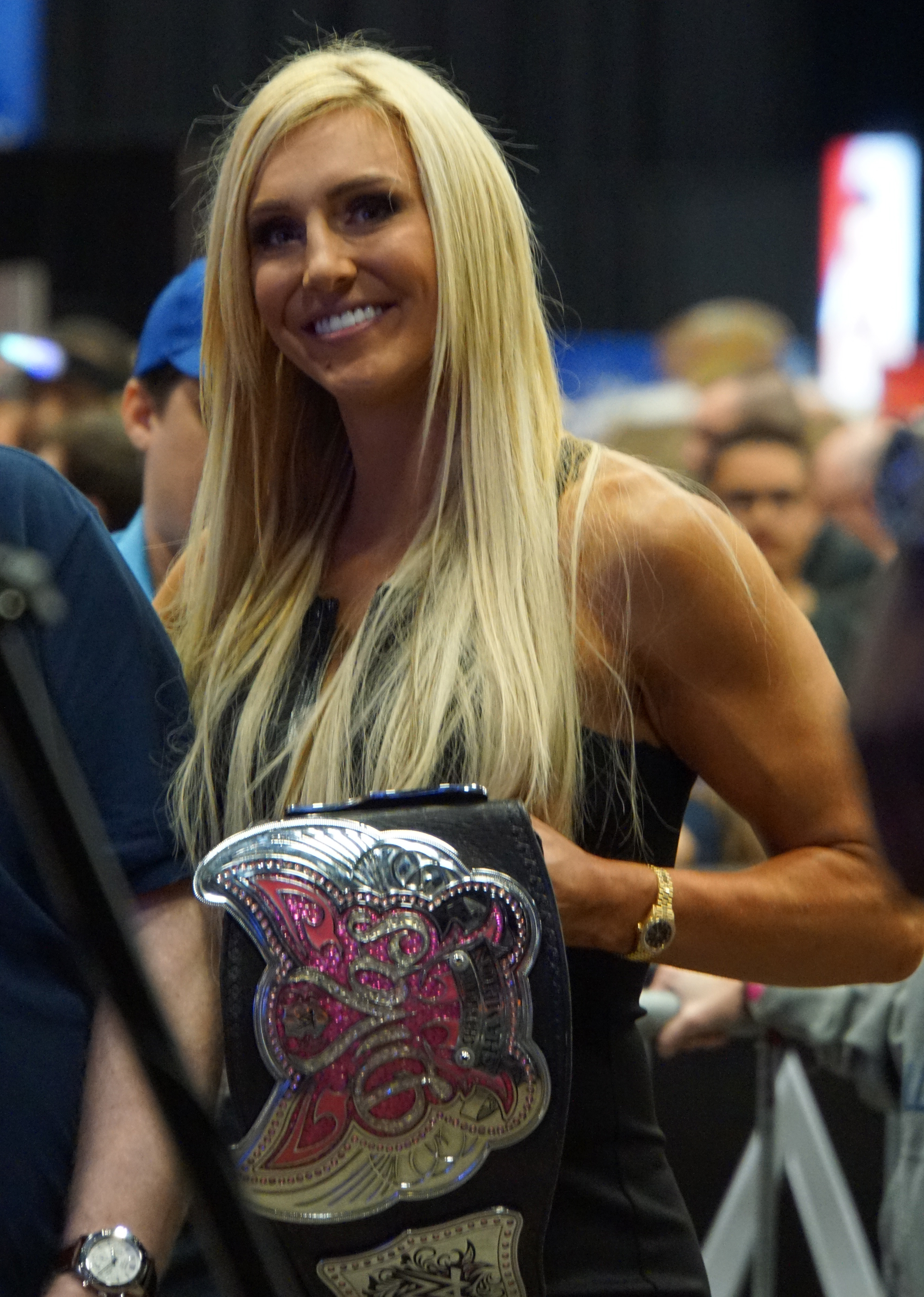
Flair is the inaugural and record six-time WWE (Raw) Women's Champion, a record seven-time WWE SmackDown Women's Champion, and the final WWE Divas Champion
- The Baltimore Sun
  - WWE Female Wrestler of the Year (2016)
- CBS Sports
  - WWE Match of the Year (2018) vs. Asuka and Becky Lynch at TLC: Tables, Ladders & Chairs
- Pro Wrestling Illustrated
  - Feud of the Year (2016) vs. Sasha Banks
  - Rookie of the Year (2014)
  - Woman of the Year (2016)
  - Match of the Year (2023) vs. Rhea Ripley at WrestleMania 39
  - Ranked No. 1 of the top 50 female wrestlers in the PWI Female 50 in 2016
- Rolling Stone
  - Ranked No. 2 of the 10 best WWE wrestlers of 2016
- Sports Illustrated
  - Ranked No. 2 of the top 10 women's wrestlers in 2018
- Wrestling Observer Newsletter
  - Worst Feud of the Year (2015) Team PCB vs. Team B.A.D. vs. Team Bella
- WWE
  - WWE (Raw) Women's Championship (Note: Charlotte Flair's first reign was when the championship was called the WWE Women's Championship As a result of the 2016 WWE Draft, which happened during her first reign, the title became exclusive to Raw. It was renamed the Raw Women's Championship during her second reign after SmackDown created the SmackDown Women's Championship. It then reverted to its original name of WWE Women's Championship after it transferred to SmackDown as a result of the 2023 WWE Draft.) (6 times, inaugural)
  - WWE SmackDown Women's Championship (Note: The title was renamed as the Women's World Championship after her seventh reign after the title transferred to Raw as a result of the 2023 WWE Draft.) (7 times)
  - WWE Divas Championship (1 time, final)
  - NXT Women's Championship (2 times)
  - WWE Women's Tag Team Championship (2 times) – with Alexa Bliss (1) and Asuka (1)
  - Fifth Women's Triple Crown Champion
  - Fourth Women's Grand Slam Champion
  - NXT Women's Championship Tournament (2014)
  - Women's Royal Rumble (2020, 2025)
  - Slammy Award for Match of the Year (2024) vs. Rhea Ripley at WrestleMania 39
  - WWE Year-End Award for Match of the Year (2018) vs. Becky Lynch at Evolution
