= Michael Larsen =

Michael Larsen may refer to:

- Michael Larsen (footballer) (born 1969), Danish footballer who competed at the 1992 Summer Olympics
- Michael J. Larsen, American mathematician
- Micheal Larsen, rapper known by the stage name Eyedea

== See also ==
- Michael Larson (disambiguation)
