= Paul Grayson =

Paul Grayson may refer to:

- Paul Grayson (cricketer) (born 1971), English cricketer
- Paul Grayson (rugby union) (born 1971), English rugby union player
