= Grayson Earle =

American artist & activist (born 1987)

Grayson Earle (born 1987) is an American contemporary artist and activist. He uses new media to make political statements, known for his guerilla video projections as a member of The Illuminator Art Collective, and his co-creation of Bail Bloc which is software that utilizes cryptocurrency mining to generate money which is then re-distributed to bail low income people out of jail. In 2020, he hacked the Hans Haacke career retrospective exhibition at the New Museum to criticize the museum's efforts to union bust its employees. Earle is an outspoken anti-capitalist and professor at the New School.

== Biography ==
Grayson Earle was born in California. He attended UC Irvine before moving to New York City to enroll in the Hunter College Integrated Media Arts MFA program.

== Career and works ==
=== The Illuminator ===
In 2014, Earle was arrested during an The Illuminator Art Collective projection with Kyle Depew and Yates McKee. The arrest occurred as the group projected onto the Metropolitan Museum of Art after David Koch donated $60 million to have his name permanently added to the fountain outside. Earle and the others were released from jail and successfully sued the NYPD for violating their First Amendment Rights.

=== Ai Wei Whoops! ===
In 2014, Earle released Ai Wei Whoops!, an online game that allows the player to smash Ai Weiwei urns. This was done in response to Maximo Caminero's destruction of an Ai Weiwei urn in the Miama Perez Art Museum.

=== Tax Deductible Expenses ===
In 2016, Earle kept a receipt for every single purchase he made and recorded himself "consuming" the item in his work Tax Deductible Expenses. For the entire year, he wrote off every purchase made (for clothes, food, etc.) and recorded himself with the object of purchase, deeming it performance art, and was therefore able to write off everything as professional expense.

=== Bail Bloc ===
In 2017, Earle co-created Bail Bloc. Bail Bloc is software that utilizes cryptocurrency mining to generate money which is then re-distributed to bail low income people out of jail. Bail Bloc was exhibited alongside Ai Weiwei at Kate Vass Galerie in Zurich, Switzerland for the gallery's "Perfect and Priceless" exhibition. He also presented the work at The Whitney Museum of Art, and MoMA PS1

=== Hacking the Hans Haacke Retrospective ===
In 2020, Earle hacked the Hans Haacke Retrospective at the New Museum in New York City. The exhibition revolved around a survey which visitors could take on iPads in the museum. The questions in the survey ranged from demographic information to political questions about income inequality and the environment. Earle notes in several interviews that he was inspired by the museum hiring a union-busting firm to oust its organizing employees while simultaneously putting leftist art on display. Earle changed the results of the survey by falsifying hundreds of thousands of entries, resulting in the survey answers changing to "better expresses the political position of American museums like the New Museum".

== Published texts ==
- Software for Artists: Building Better Realities (The Creative Independent 2020)
- Digital Resistance and Monkey-Wrenching (Pioneer Works 2020)
- All of Our Grievances are Connected (Public Art Dialogue, MIT Press, co-authored with Mark Read 2015)
- The Illuminator (First Person Scholar 2015)

== See also ==
- Hacktivism
- The Illuminator Art Collective
