= Anthony Rayson =

American anarchist activist and author

Anthony Rayson (born 17 August 1953) is an American anarchist activist and author. He runs the South Chicago ABC Zine Distro and publishes many zines and pamphlets. DePaul University Archives and Special Collections holds a collection of Rayson's zines, as well as his compiled political writings and works of incarcerated persons'.

Rayson is the co-founder of and an officer for the Proposed Chicago south suburban airport "Shut This Airport Nightmare Down" (STAND), resident's group in Peotone, Illinois which has opposed the Proposed Chicago south suburban airport, an effort that has been joined by environmentalists. He was also a leader in the rejection of the construction of a for-profit prison by the community of Crete, saying, "Crete is a legitimate farm community. It's one year older than Chicago. We're not desperate. We're not dying for money."
