= Grayson Hajash =

Hungarian-Canadian professional football player

Profile
- Positions: Running back, defensive back

Personal information
- Born: 1925; Mátramindszent, Hungary
- Died: March 27, 2015 (aged 89)

Career information
- College: University of Alberta

Career history
- 1949: Calgary Stampeders

Awards and highlights
- University of Alberta Sports Hall of Fame (1994)

Grayson "Mickey" Hajash (1925 - March 27, 2015) was a running back with the Calgary Stampeders in the Canadian Football League.

== Career ==
Hajash, perhaps the first CFL player born in Hungary, was a star with the Alberta Golden Bears. He played one season with the Stamps, including the 1949 Grey Cup. He later established the Grayson (Mickey) Hajash Athletic Award. An engineer, he had a long career in oil exploration.
