= Charles Grayson =

Charles Grayson may refer to:

- Charles Grayson (writer) (1903–1973), American screenwriter and novelist
- Charles E. Grayson (1910–2009), American radiologist and archer
- Charles F. Grayson, alias of Moody Merrill (1836–1903), American politician, businessman, and fugitive
- Trey Grayson (Charles Merwin Grayson III) (born 1972), American politician
