= Richard Grayson =

Richard Grayson may refer to:

- Dick Grayson, a DC Comics fictional character
- Richard Grayson (composer) (1941–2016), American pianist and composer
- Richard Grayson (writer) (born 1951), American writer and political activist
- Richard Grayson (artist) (born 1958), British artist, writer and curator
- Richard Grayson (academic) (born 1969), British professor, political activist and commentator

== See also ==
- Richard Grason (1820–1893), judge of the Maryland Court of Appeals
