= Robert Grayson =

Robert Grayson may refer to:

- Marvel Boy (Robert Grayson), a fictional superhero in Marvel Comics
- Robert Grayson (comedian) (died 2022), New York-born comedian based in Australia
- Bobby Grayson (1914–1981), American football player

== See also ==
- Robert Grayson Littlejohn, American physicist
