= Grayson Gilbert =

American entrepreneur and cancer survivor

Charles Grayson Gilbert (1990–2023) was an American entrepreneur and cancer survivor.

In October 1995, he was the fifth ever child in recorded medical history to be diagnosed with a rare form of pancreatic cancer known as pancreatoblastoma. A pancreaticoduodenectomy, or Whipple's Procedure, was successful. He was given less than a 2% chance of survival at the time of his diagnosis. Still, he was declared cancer-free on July 1, 1996. During his treatment, he was photographed by The Baltimore Sun as he left the note at the foot of Christus Consolator, a statue in the atrium at Johns Hopkins Hospital. The note read, “Dear Jesus, this is Grayson. If you could, just heal the other kids please. Thank you very much.”

He went on to represent the Children's Miracle Network and Johns Hopkins Hospital in various non-profit and public benefit events and fundraisers.

On January 1, 2012, Gilbert announced the creation of the Inspirational Medicine Foundation, a Maryland-based non-profit dedicated to "connecting sick children with their heroes." Since then, his work with the Foundation has received kudos from the national press, such as The Huffington Post, which named Gilbert as "Greatest Person of the Day" and has received both collegiate and Maryland based media exposure.

Gilbert died in his sleep on April 9, 2023, at his mother's home in Baltimore County. He was 33.
