= Jeff Grayson =

Jeff Grayson may refer to:

- Jeffrey Grayson (1942–2009), American businessman and criminal
- Jeff Grayson (sportscaster), sportscaster for Fox Sports Wisconsin
