= Grayson County =

Grayson County is the name of three counties in the United States:

- Grayson County, Kentucky
- Grayson County, Texas
- Grayson County, Virginia
