= Ralph Grayson =

Ralph Lawrence Grayson (1921–1991) was a scientist, engineer, pilot, attorney, soldier, father and husband. He went on to be a pioneer in network computing at both the Federal Aviation Administration (FAA) and NASA.

== Early life ==
Grayson was born on April 29, 1921, in Fort Smith, Arkansas. His father, Albert Grayson, an Arkansas sharecropper, and his mother, Pearl Foster Grayson (1895–1934), was a homemaker. Grayson was the eldest and he had seven other siblings. Grayson also had 3 step-siblings.

== Career ==
In 1979 Ralph retired from the FAA, where he served as Associate Commander, Memphis Air Route Traffic Control Center. During this tenure, NASA made several overtures to recruit him. He initially turned these offers down. However, he was later approached with a package deal through Battelle, where he was employed as a subcontractor. He accepted.

At NASA, Ralph held the title of Principal Research Scientist, Aviation Safety Reporting System Project Office located at Moffett Field Naval Air Station in Mountain View, California.

Ralph Grayson was a leading in aviation safety — human error, redundancy systems, and computerized safety systems. His technical papers written during his final years at the FAA and at NASA, became reference material in the field for a generation.
