= David Flair =

American professional wrestler (born 1979)

Personal information
- Born: David Richard Fliehr; March 6, 1979 (age 47) Minneapolis, Minnesota, U.S.
- Spouse: Robin Haskell (m. 2004)
- Children: 2
- Parent: Ric Flair (father)
- Relatives: Charlotte Flair (half-sister); Reid Flair (half-brother); Conrad Thompson (brother-in-law)

Professional wrestling career
- Ring name: David Flair
- Billed height: 6 ft 1 in (185 cm)
- Billed weight: 177 lb (80 kg)
- Billed from: Charlotte, North Carolina
- Trained by: Ric Flair; WCW Power Plant
- Debut: January 17, 1999
- Retired: May 15, 2009

David Richard Fliehr (born March 6, 1979), better known by the ring name David Flair, is an American retired professional wrestler. He is best known for his tenure in World Championship Wrestling (WCW), where he held the WCW United States Championship and WCW World Tag Team Championship. He is the son of professional wrestler Ric Flair, and the half-brother of professional wrestlers Charlotte Flair and Reid Flair.

== Professional wrestling career ==
=== World Championship Wrestling (1993, 1998–2001) ===
Growing up, Flair did not want to become a wrestler, like his father; he always wanted to be a state trooper. He appeared on camera backstage with his father at Starrcade '93: 10th Anniversary in World Championship Wrestling. In the storyline, his father was going to have to "retire" if he lost his match, so his family appeared to increase the emotion. In late-1998, David was back on WCW TV sitting front row and getting involved in some skirmishes with Eric Bischoff and the New World Order (nWo).

He eventually decided to become a wrestler and teamed with his father in his debut match at WCW/nWo Souled Out on January 17, 1999. Fliehr wrestled under his father's altered surname of "Flair". They wrestled Curt Hennig and Barry Windham and won the match.

On February 21, 1999, at SuperBrawl IX, David turned on his father and joined the nWo Elite. He used a taser on his father to help Hogan win their WCW World Title match. He did not wrestle for a while but did appear in vignettes with Samantha while he was training at the WCW Power Plant.

Flair started to wrestle a regular schedule in May 1999. He made up with his father who then had the Four Horsemen help Flair win matches. Ric, being the on-screen WCW President, stripped WCW United States Champion Scott Steiner of his title and awarded it to Flair. On July 11, Flair defeated Dean Malenko, with the help of Ric and Arn Anderson, to keep the title in his first defense on pay-per-view.

Flair was joined by Daffney at Starrcade in 1999. He was joined a little later by Crowbar. They formed a team and won the vacant WCW World Tag Team Titles in a tournament final on January 3, 2000, over Kevin Nash and Scott Steiner with Anderson as the special referee. They lost the titles to Big Vito and Johnny the Bull, The Mamalukes, on January 19. Flair soon split with Crowbar and in May 2000, joined Vince Russo's New Blood faction. He dumped Daffney and took Miss Hancock as his valet. He also turned on his father again which led to a match against him at The Great American Bash. Flair lost, but the next night, he won a match against his father to retire him and shave his father's head.

=== Independent circuit (2001) ===
Flair toured in the independent circuit for the first part of 2001. He teamed with Don Factor to win the NWA World Tag Team Championship on March 21. They lost them on March 23. He then teamed with Romeo Bliss to win the NWA Georgia Tag Team Championship on March 24. They lost them on April 21.

=== World Wrestling Federation / World Wrestling Entertainment (2001–2002, 2003, 2006) ===
In May 2001, the World Wrestling Federation picked up Flair's WCW contract and sent him to Ohio Valley Wrestling. He stayed there and feuded with Val Venis and had a brief tag team with Mark Jindrak until late 2002, when they dropped his development contract. He did make two appearances on WWF TV during 2002 as he was beaten up by The Undertaker on March 4 and wrestled the Undertaker on March 14 as part of the build-up for his father's match against Undertaker at WrestleMania X8.

In May 2003, Flair did a series of dark matches for Sunday Night Heat and WWE Velocity.

In January 2006, Flair lost to William Regal in a dark match.

=== NWA Total Nonstop Action (2002–2003) ===
Flair joined NWA Total Nonstop Action in December 2002. He joined Vince Russo's Sports Entertainment Xtreme (S.E.X.) group. He had a brief feud with Curt Hennig and then left S.E.X. to form Next Generation with Brian Lawler and Erik Watts. Together, they feuded with Dusty Rhodes and mocked him with an old NWA World Title belt. David left TNA in April 2003.

=== Late career (2003–2009) ===
After NWA TNA, David toured the independent circuit, winning the IWA Intercontinental Championship from Ray Gonzalez on November 28, 2003, in Puerto Rico. He lost it to Gonzalez two days later. Flair quit IWA after problems with IWA promoter Víctor Quiñones.

On April 25, 2004, Flair defeated Dory Funk Jr. at Funk's Funking Conservatory in Ocala, Florida.

In January 2005, Flair appeared in Japan with All Japan Pro Wrestling.

On December 6, 2008, he wrestled a match with his half-brother, Reid, who was making his professional wrestling debut, defeating The Nasty Boys via submission in Charlotte, North Carolina, with Hulk Hogan as the special guest referee.

Flair's last match was on May 15, 2009 teaming with Ricky Morton as they defeated Buff Bagwell and Rikki Nelson at NWA Mid-Atlantic in Lincolnton, North Carolina.

== Personal life ==
Flair's mother, Leslie Goodman, is Jewish.

His parents separated around the time of his birth in 1979, with David being raised mainly with his mother in Minneapolis, Minnesota. Flair acknowledged that he hardly saw his dad, who opted to live in Charlotte, North Carolina after separating from his mother, while growing up. However, David still wanted to follow in his dad's footsteps and they would bond more as he grew older.

Flair dated Stacy Keibler in 2000, when they both worked in WCW. Flair married Robin Haskell in 2004, and they reside in Shelby, North Carolina. They have two children, Pyper and Carter. Pyper is a nationally ranked gymnast.

== Championships and accomplishments ==
- AFE Championship Wrestling
  - AFE Heavyweight Championship (1 time)
- International Wrestling Association
  - IWA Intercontinental Heavyweight Championship (1 time)
- Mid Atlantic Championship Wrestling
  - NWA Mid-Atlantic Tag Team Championship (1 time) - with Reid Flair
- NWA Charlotte
  - NWA Mid-Atlantic Heritage Championship (1 time)
- National Wrestling Alliance
  - NWA World Tag Team Championship (1 time) - with Dan Factor
- NWA Wildside
  - NWA Wildside Tag Team Championship (1 time) - with Romeo Bliss
  - Tojo Yamamoto Memorial Cup (2002)
- Pro Wrestling Illustrated
  - Ranked No. 168 of the top 500 singles wrestlers in the PWI 500 in 2002
- World Championship Wrestling
  - WCW United States Heavyweight Championship (1 time)
  - WCW World Tag Team Championship (1 time) - with Crowbar
  - WCW World Tag Team Championship Tournament (January 2000) - with Crowbar
