= John Grayson =

John Grayson may refer to:

- John Grayson (cricketer) (1871–1936), English cricketer
- John B. Grayson (1806–1861), U.S Army lieutenant-colonel in the Mexican–American War, later Confederate brigadier general in the American Civil War
- John Grayson (Heroic Publishing), a fictional superhero better known as Icestar
