= George Grayson =

George Grayson may refer to:

- George Enoch Grayson (1833/34–1912), English architect
- George W. Grayson (1938–2015), American academic and politician from Virginia
- George Washington Grayson (1843–1920), American Indian (Muscogee) town founder and Confederate soldier
