= Grason =

Grason may refer to:

- Grason Makara (born 2000), Australian rugby union player
- C. Gus Grason (1881–1953), judge of the Maryland Court of Appeals
- Richard Grason, judge of the Maryland Court of Appeals
- William Grason (1788–1868), 25th Governor of Maryland
- Gräsön, a former island in the Swedish sector of the Bay of Bothnia that is now the Western part of Hindersön

== See also ==
- Grayson (disambiguation)
