= Grayson Murphy =

Grayson Murphy may refer to:

- Grayson M. P. Murphy (1878–1937), American banker and company director
- Grayson Murphy (runner) (born 1995), American mountain runner
- Grayson Murphy (basketball) (born 1999), American basketball player
- Grayson Murphy (American football) (born 2000), American football player
