= Ethel Grayson =

Canadian writer and educator

Ethel Kirk Grayson (March 20, 1890 – November 27, 1980) was a Canadian writer and educator.

== Biography ==
The daughter of William Grayson, a lawyer, and Ellen Babb, she was born in Moose Jaw and received her early education there, going on to earn a BA from the University of Toronto and a MA from the University of Manitoba. Grayson also attended the Curry School of Expression in Massachusetts for a year where she studied special studies. She lectured on English literature at Alberta College in Edmonton, at Mount Allison Ladies' College in New Brunswick and at MacMurray College for Women, for the Department of English, in Illinois. Having loved lecturing, Grayson also had the privilege of speaking in Canadian clubs on the East Coast.

Grayson traveled in Europe, Africa and South America with her cousin Vaughan.

Grayson contributed poetry and prose to various literary periodicals. The most famous poems from Grayson are in a series called Beggar's Velvet. Three of her books named Apples of The Moon, Willow Smoke, and Fires in the Vine were written with strong Canadian influence. Her work earned her a number of honours, including winning the Canadian Poetry Prize Award four times and receiving awards from the periodicals Shards and The Writer. She published one play Flower of the Storm.

Grayson had traveled around the world to five continents. She died in Moose Jaw at the age of 90.

A memorial scholarship was established in her name.

== Selected works ==
- The Seigneur's Daughter, novel (1920), appeared in installments in Women's Century
- Willow Smoke, novel (1928)
- Apples of the Moon, novel (1933)
- Fires in the Vine, novel (1942)
- Beggar's Velvet, poetry (1948)
- Unbind the Sheaves: A Prairie Memoir, memoir (1964)

== Unbind the Sheaves: A Prairie Memoir ==
Unbinding the Sheaves, written in 1964 was described as a prairie memoir by the author, Ethel Kirk Grayson. The novel is viewed as a reflection of the authors memories in Saskatchewan during the pioneer days in the steam engine era. The story focuses on the excitement that the steam engine train and new settlers brought to the townsfolk of the city of Moose Jaw, and the way people lived during this changing time. The novel is described to have no constant story line as it jumps from one year to another and then back, it also changes the setting as the story takes the readers on trips to other provinces, such as Alberta and Manitoba. Unbind the Sheaves: A Prairie Memoir is thought to describe a world which the people (people from the 1960s) find relevant and yet as if it's from a different era.
