= Vaughan Grayson =

Canadian artist and educator

- Born: Ellen Vaughan Kirk Grayson; September 14, 1894; Moose Jaw, Saskatchewan
- Died: February 8, 1995 (aged 100)
- Education: Curry School of Expression, St. Margaret's College, Columbia University
- Known for: painter, graphic artist
- Style: Impressionist, representational
- Spouse: Arthur J. Mann (m. 1929)

Ellen Vaughan Kirk Grayson (September 14, 1894 – February 8, 1995) was a Canadian artist and educator. She was born in Moose Jaw, Saskatchewan but her time spent hiking in the Canadian Rockies and the Okanagan Valley shaped her artistic style.

== Family life ==
The daughter of Adela and John Hawke Grayson, Grayson was born on the family farm near Moose Jaw. She began painting as a young girl, and was given lessons by a local artist named Gertrude Rorason. After she married Arthur J. Mann in 1929, she moved to Summerland, British Columbia. Grayson moved back to Moose Jaw in 1961 and later died there at the age of 100.

== Work and education ==
After completing high school, she travelled in Europe, Africa and South America with her cousin Ethel, attending schools in Budapest and London. She continued her education at St. Margaret's College in Toronto, at the Curry School of Expression in Massachusetts, and at Columbia University, where she obtained a Bachelor of Science. She worked as an advisor for the Moose Jaw school board and as an art instructor at teachers' colleges in Regina and Moose Jaw. Grayson also published art appreciation textbooks for elementary and secondary school students. She taught at the University of British Columbia, at the Summer School of Fine Arts in Penticton and at the Banff School of Fine Arts. After Arthur's death, she travelled to Japan, New Zealand, and Mexico to further pursue her art. In Mexico, at the Instituto Allende in San Miguel de Allende, she studied with artist Fred Samuelson.

== Artwork ==
Grayson painted in the impressionist style. Her work appeared in exhibitions in the United States and Canada and is included in the collections of the Art Gallery of Hamilton and the Moose Jaw Museum & Art Gallery. She painted in oil and watercolours and also produced silk screen prints. In 1942, her work was included in British Columbia's Annual Exhibition.

== Writing ==
She also composed a manuscript entitled Adventures of an Artist in the Canadian Rockies that was published posthumously. The work is made up of her experiences hiking and sketching in the Rocky Mountains.

== Group exhibitions ==
- 1930s Penticton Museum, Kelowna Public Library, and Vernon Public Library
- 1940 Canadian National Exhibition, Contemporary Art of Canada and Newfoundland
- 1942-45 Vancouver Art Gallery, 11th-14th Annual British Columbia Exhibitions
- 1952 Vancouver Art Gallery, Annual British Columbia Exhibitions
- 1957 New York, National Serigraph Society
- 1959 Society of Canadian Painter-Etchers and Engravers
- 1981 Art Gallery of Hamilton, Society of Canadian Painter-Etchers, and Engravers: In Retrospect

== Solo exhibitions ==
- 1957 Moose Jaw Art Museum and National Exhibition Centre
- 1967 Moose Jaw Art Museum and National Exhibition Centre, Vaughan Grayson Paintings
- 1979 Moose Jaw, Paintings by Vaughan Grayson
- 1980 Allie Griffin Gallery
- 1985 Kelowna Art Gallery, Ellen Vaughan Grayson: A Retrospective
- 2000 Kelowna Art Gallery, Working From The Collection: Ellen Vaughan Grayson
- 2002 Moose Jaw Museum and Art Gallery, Vaughan Grayson
