= Grayson (film) =

- Directed by: John Fiorella
- Written by: John Fiorella
- Produced by: John Fiorella; Gabriel Sabloff
- Starring: John Fiorella
- Cinematography: Gabriel Sabloff
- Distributed by: Untamed Cinema; TheForce.Net
- Release date: July 20, 2004
- Running time: 6 minutes
- Country: United States
- Language: English
- Budget: $18,000

Grayson is a 2004 fan film made by John Fiorella featuring DC Comics character Dick Grayson along with several other DC Universe characters. Since it is a fan film, it was not allowed to be sold at a profit and was thus distributed for free on the Internet.

The film is a mock trailer for a Grayson feature film; however, no such film exists. There are also no plans for a full-length feature film, because the filmmakers have no possibility to produce such a film without the support of Warner Bros.

== Plot summary ==
Batman has been murdered, and his killer remains at large. Dick Grayson is long since retired from his superhero days and raising a family with his wife Barbara Gordon. After his former mentor's death, however, Dick decides to resume his crime-fighting days as Robin. (Note: Grayson does not take up the Nightwing identity. The filmmakers said they chose this because many people outside the comic book community are unfamiliar with Nightwing and they wanted to appeal to a wider audience.)

Commissioner Gordon is aware of Grayson's secret identity and assists him by supplying official documents. The head of the investigation into Batman's death is indicated to be Chief O'Hara, (Note: A character from the 1960s Batman TV series.) who also knows Grayson's identity. He strongly wants Grayson to not become involved, even to the point of aligning with Selina Kyle/Catwoman to eliminate Robin and shouting at reporter Clark Kent that he wants "him [presumably Grayson] out of the equation!" O'Hara is also seen rolling up his sleeves, preparing to assault an angry captive Gordon.

- Grayson is aware of Superman's secret identity; he addresses him as "Clark". Superman apparently is also motivated (from O'Hara) to discourage Grayson's return to crimefighting and three confrontations between the characters are shown, in and out of costume. Grayson is also angered to violence by the sight of a Superman comic book, suggesting a negative history between the two. (Note: In this scene, other comic books also appear of characters from the film, including Wonder Woman and Catwoman. Fiorella used his own comic book collection for this scene.)
- Longtime Batman villains Penguin and Riddler briefly appear, with a larger role taken by the Joker. A brief scene (Note: Adapted from The Killing Joke.) features Barbara Gordon crawling away from a door as the Joker breaks in. Afterwards, the Joker is seen walking through a park with the Graysons' daughter.
- Wonder Woman is shown deflecting bullets from her bracelets, snaring Robin in her golden lasso, and mourning over what appears to be the body of Superman.
- An unidentified Green Lantern has a momentary appearance, standing next to a fallen Robin, though the context is unexplained.
- The trailer suggests the Justice League wants to stop Grayson from announcing Batman's death. (Note: The filmmakers clarified that it was never their intention to portray the other superheroes as villains. They might be rather ordered to stop Dick because he is heading down a dangerous road.)

It is implied that Batman may not actually be dead. (Note: Fiorella's commentary on the "Behind the Scenes" video confirms that this ambiguity was his goal: "I wanted to make people wonder if in fact Batman had really been killed.")

== Cast ==
- John Fiorella as Dick Grayson/Robin
- Brian C. Bethel as The Joker
- Paul Hasenyager as Clark Kent/Superman
- Anthony Heartley as Chief O'Hara
- Kate Clarke as Wonder Woman
- Kimberly Page as Selina Kyle/Catwoman
- Gloria Payne as Barbara Grayson/Batgirl
- Mark Brodkin as Commissioner Gordon

== Production ==
The project began when Fiorella was searching, along with his director of photography Gabriel Sabloff, for a suitable subject for a demo reel that would showcase their filmmaking abilities. When Fiorella raised the idea of a film about Robin, Sabloff was skeptical at first, but soon convinced. The objective of Fiorella was to "tell a new and exciting story about the former boy wonder that leaves audiences wanting more" and let the viewer be the judge to decide if he hit the mark.

With a budget of $18,000, the filmmakers created a five-and-a-half minute trailer complete with motorcycle chases, underwater escapes, pyrotechnics and feats of strength. Most of the production budget went to 16mm film stock, production equipment, processing and transfers, leaving little for anything else. According to the behind the scenes video of Grayson, their budget did not allow for daily film transfers, so the filmmakers only saw developed footage in batches every three months. The two employed guerrilla filmmaking tactics, filming mainly on weekends and at whatever locations they could find, often without permission.

== Additional material ==
The screenplay for the non-existent motion picture is available for viewing at the Untamed Cinema website, and features most of the events shown in the trailer, although with some differences, as well as a full explanation of all questions raised by the trailer.

A behind the scenes documentary of Grayson is also available for download. Grayson: Pieces of the Puzzle is a 30-minute featurette with commentary by John Fiorella.

== Reception ==
After the publicity generated by the film's online release at TheForce.net, the film was to be screened at the 2004 San Diego Comic-Con, but all superhero fanfilm screenings were cancelled that year, as DC Comics requested that the convention honor their intellectual property rights and halt all showings of fanfilms based on their characters.
