= The Scam Artist =

- Directed by: Cliff Hensley
- Written by: Cliff Hensley
- Produced by: Cliff Hensley; Diamond Dallas Page; Edgeworks Entertainment
- Starring: Kimberly Page; Michael Patrick Larson; Diamond Dallas Page; Angie Fox; Tim McNally
- Distributed by: IndieFlix; Edgeworks Entertainment
- Release date: 2004
- Running time: 76 minutes
- Country: United States
- Language: English

The Scam Artist was a 2004 independent film that was meant to catapult the acting career of Kimberly Page.

The movie stars Kimberly Page, her then husband Diamond Dallas Page and Michael Patrick Larson. The plot was set in the future in the United States. Corporations rule America and the daughter of a wealthy CEO, Sylvia Heinrich (Kimberly Page), cooks up a scheme with her boyfriend, David Sands (Larson), to fake her kidnapping and to leave the country with the ransom money.

They involve a mercenary, Lenny (Diamond Dallas Page) to assist but then things start to go haywire and greed begins to rear its ugly head. Sylvia's father, Winston (Tim McNally) does not want to pay a ransom and adds his thugs to the mix.
