= Drayson =

Drayson is a surname which may refer to:

- Alfred Wilks Drayson (1827–1901), English army officer, author and astronomer
- Burnaby Drayson (1913–1983), British Conservative politician
- Elizabeth Drayson (born 1954), academic in Spanish literature and cultural history at Murray Edwards College, Cambridge
- FitzAlan Drayson (1888–1964), English cricketer and British Army officer
- Nick Drayson (born 1953), Anglican Bishop of Northern Argentina
- Paul Drayson, Baron Drayson (born 1960), British businessman and politician, founder of Drayson Racing
- Robert Drayson (1919–2008), English naval officer and schoolmaster
- Zac Drayson (born 1983), Australian actor
