= Greyson =

Greyson is a given name and a surname. Notable people with the name include:

== Given name ==
- Greyson Chance (born 1997), American pop rock singer and pianist
- Greyson Gilmer (born 1996), American esports player
- Greyson Gunheim (born 1986), free agent American football defensive end
- Greyson Lambert (born 1994), American football player
- Greyson Nekrutman (born 2002), American drummer

== Surname ==
- Ashley Greyson, film and music video director, cinematographer, editor, and producer
- Bruce Greyson, M.D. (born 1946), Professor of Psychiatry at the University of Virginia
- John Greyson (born 1960), Canadian filmmaker, whose work frequently deals with gay themes
- Kelly Greyson, American actress

== See also ==
- Grayson (given name)
- Grayson (surname)
