= 1990 in professional wrestling =

1990 in professional wrestling describes the year's events in the world of professional wrestling.

== List of notable promotions ==
These promotions held notable events in 1990.

Promotion Name	Abbreviation	Notes
All Japan Pro Wrestling	AJPW	
All Japan Women's Pro-Wrestling	AJW	
American Wrestling Association	AWA	AWA became inactive during the fall and filed for bankruptcy the following year.
Empresa Mexicana de Lucha Libre	EMLL	
Frontier Martial-Arts Wrestling	FMW	
National Wrestling Alliance	NWA	
New Japan Pro-Wrestling	NJPW	
World Championship Wrestling	WCW	
World Wrestling Council	WWC	
World Wrestling Federation	WWF	

== Calendar of notable shows ==
Date	Promotion(s)	Event	Location	Main Event
Jan 3	WWF	Saturday Night's Main Event	Chattanooga, Tennessee, U.S.	Hulk Hogan and The Ultimate Warrior vs. Mr. Perfect and The Genius in a tag team match
Jan 7	FMW	Battle Resistance – 1st Open Tournament	Tokyo, Japan	Masanobu Kurisi defeated Tarzan Goto by referee's decision in an Open Tournament final match
Jan 21	WWF	Royal Rumble	Orlando, Florida, U.S.	Hulk Hogan won by last eliminating Mr. Perfect in the 30-man Royal Rumble match
Feb 6	NWA; WCW	Clash of the Champions X	Corpus Christi, Texas, U.S.	The Four Horsemen (Ric Flair, Ole Anderson, and Arn Anderson) defeated Gary Hart International (The Dragonmaster, Buzz Sawyer, and The Great Muta) in a Steel Cage match
Feb 10	NJPW	Super Fight in Tokyo Dome	Tokyo, Japan	Antonio Inoki and Seiji Sakaguchi defeated Masahiro Chono and Shinya Hashimoto in a tag team match with Lou Thesz as special guest referee
Feb 12	FMW	Battle Brave in Korakuen	Tokyo, Japan	Atsushi Onita defeated Masanobu Kurisu in a Barbed Wire Barricades Death Match
Feb 25	WCW	WrestleWar	Greensboro, North Carolina, U.S.	Ric Flair (c) defeated Lex Luger by countout in a Singles match for the NWA World Heavyweight Championship
Apr 1	FMW	Texas Street Fight	Tokyo, Japan	Atsushi Onita and Tarzan Goto defeated Dragon Master and Masanobu Kurisu in a Tag Team Texas Street Fight
Apr 1	WWF	WrestleMania VI	Toronto, Ontario, Canada	Ultimate Warrior (IC Champion) defeated Hulk Hogan (WWF Champion) in a Singles match for the WWF Intercontinental Championship and WWF Championships
Apr 8	AWA	SuperClash IV	St. Paul, Minnesota, U.S.	The Trooper and Paul Diamond defeated The Destruction Crew (Mike Enos and Wayne Bloom) in a Steel Cage match
Apr 13	WWF; AJPW; NJPW	Wrestling Summit	Tokyo, Japan	Hulk Hogan defeated Stan Hansen in a Singles match
Apr 23	WWF	Saturday Night's Main Event	Austin, Texas, U.S.	The Ultimate Warrior (c) defeated Haku in a singles match for the WWF World Heavyweight Championship
Apr 29	AJW	W.W.W.A. Champions Legend	Tokyo, Japan	Bull Nakano (c) defeats Monster Ripper in a WWWA World Title match
May 19	NWA; WCW	Capital Combat	Washington D.C., U.S.	Lex Luger defeated Ric Flair (c) by disqualification in a Steel Cage match for the NWA World Heavyweight Championship
Jun 13	NWA; WCW	Clash of the Champions XI	Charleston, South Carolina, U.S.	Junkyard Dog defeated Ric Flair (c) by disqualification in a Singles match for the NWA World Heavyweight Championship
Jul 7	WWC	WWC 17th Aniversario	Bayamón, Puerto Rico	Carlos Colón (WWC Universal Heavyweight Champion) and TNT went to a draw in a Singles match
Jul 7	NWA	The Great American Bash	Baltimore, Maryland, U.S.	Sting defeated Ric Flair (c) in a Singles match for the NWA World Heavyweight Championship
Jul 16	WWF	Saturday Night's Main Event	Omaha, Nebraska, U.S.	The Ultimate Warrior (c) defeated Rick Rude in a singles match for the WWF World Heavyweight Championship
Aug 4	FMW	Summer Spectacular in Shiodome	Tokyo, Japan	Atsushi Onita (c) defeated Tarzan Goto via knockout in a No Ropes Exploding Barbed Wire Deathmatch for the WWA Brass Knuckles Heavyweight Championship
Aug 27	WWF	SummerSlam	Philadelphia, Pennsylvania, U.S.	The Ultimate Warrior (c) defeated Rick Rude in a Steel Cage match for the WWF Championship
Sep 5	NWA; WCW	Clash of the Champions XII	Asheville, North Carolina, U.S.	Sting (c) defeated The Black Scorpion in a Singles match for the NWA World Heavyweight Championship
Sep 18	WWF	Saturday Night's Main Event	Toledo, Ohio, U.S.	The Ultimate Warrior and The Legion of Doom (Hawk and Animal) defeated Demolition (Ax, Smash, and Crush) in a six man tag team match
Sep 30	NJPW	Inoki's 30th Wrestling Anniversary	Yokohama, Japan	Antonio Inoki and Tiger Jeet Singh defeated Animal Hamaguchi and Big Van Vader in a tag team match with Nick Bockwinkel as special guest referee
Oct 21	EMLL	EMLL 57th Anniversary Show	Mexico City, Mexico	Rayo de Jalisco Jr. defeated Cien Caras in a Best two-out-of-three falls Lucha de Apuestas mask vs. mask match
Oct 27	NWA	Halloween Havoc	Chicago, Illinois, U.S.	Sting (c) defeated Sid Vicious in a Singles match for the NWA World Heavyweight Championship
Nov 1	NJPW	NJPW Budokan Hall Show	Tokyo, Japan	Riki Choshu (c) defeated Shinya Hashimoto in a singles match for the IWGP Heavyweight Championship
Nov 5	FMW	FMW 1st Anniversary Show	Tokyo, Japan	Atsushi Onita (c) defeated Mr. Pogo via knockout in a Texas Deathmatch for the WWA Brass Knuckles Heavyweight Championship
Nov 14	AJW	Wrestlemarinepiad '90	Yokohama, Japan	Bull Nakano (c) defeats Aja Kong in a steel cage match for the WWWA World Title
Nov 20	NWA; WCW	Clash of the Champions XIII	Jacksonville, Florida, U.S.	Ric Flair defeated Butch Reed in a Singles match
Nov 22	WWF	Survivor Series	Hartford, Connecticut, U.S.	Hulk Hogan, Tito Santana, and The Ultimate Warrior defeated Hercules, Paul Roma, Rick Martel, Ted DiBiase, and The Warlord in a 3-on-5 Survivor Series elimination match
Dec 14	EMLL	Juicio Final	Mexico City, Mexico	Octagón defeated Huracán Ramírez II in a Best two-out-of-three falls Lucha de Apuesta, mask vs. mask match
Dec 16	WCW	Starrcade	St. Louis, Missouri, U.S.	Sting (c) defeated The Black Scorpion in a Steel Cage match for the NWA World Heavyweight Championship with Dick the Bruiser as special guest referee
Dec 26	NJPW	NJPW Legends Show	Hamamatsu, Japan	Tony Halme defeated Shinya Hashimoto by knockout in a Boxer vs. Wrestler match
(c) – denotes defending champion(s)

== Notable events ==
- January 1 – The CWA merges with the United States Wrestling Association
- May 5 – Two World title matches was held at a AWA Twin Wars '90 live event where Larry Zbyszko defeated Nikita Koloff to retain the AWA World Heavyweight title and NWA World Heavyweight Champion Ric Flair defeated Brian Pillman
- July 16- The Road Warriors and "The Texas Tornado" Kerry Von Erich made their WWF debuts at a WWF Wrestling Challenge TV taping.
- August 12 – The AWA hosts their Team Challenge Series final and two title changes were taped with Buck Zumhoff defeating Jonnie Stewart for the reactivated AWA Light Heavyweight title and The Trooper and D.J. Peterson defeating the Destruction Crew for the AWA World Tag Team titles at their final TV taping in Rochester, MN
- August 26 – The Herb Abrams version of the Universal Wrestling Federation (Herb Abrams) was launched at a Wrestling fans convention in New York, NY
- November 22 – The Undertaker and The Gobbledy Gooker (Héctor Guerrero) debut at WWF Survivor Series
- November 23 – World Class Championship Wrestling (WCCW) held its final show.
- December 1 – WCW drops the NWA brand from their TV shows and championships.

== Accomplishments and tournaments ==
=== AJW ===
Accomplishment	Winner	Date won	Notes
Japan Grand Prix 1990	Manami Toyota	June 17	
Rookie of the Year Decision Tournament	Shiho Tsubaki		

=== AJPW ===
Accomplishment	Winner	Date won	Notes
World's Strongest Determination League 1990	Terry Gordy and Steve Williams	December 7	

=== WCW ===
Accomplishment	Winner	Date won	Notes
NWA United States Tag Team Championship Tournament	"Flyin' Brian" Pillman and "Z-Man" Tom Zenk	February 12	
Pat O'Connor Memorial International Tag Team Tournament	The Steiner Brothers (Rick Steiner and Scott Steiner)	December 16	

=== WWF ===
Accomplishment	Winner	Date won	Notes
Royal Rumble	Hulk Hogan	January 21	
WWF Intercontinental Heavyweight Championship Tournament	Mr. Perfect	April 1	

== Awards and honors ==
=== Pro Wrestling Illustrated ===
Category	Winner
Wrestler of the Year	Sting
Tag Team of the Year	The Steiner Brothers (Rick and Scott Steiner)
Match of the Year	Hulk Hogan vs. The Ultimate Warrior (WrestleMania VI)
Feud of the Year	Ric Flair vs. Lex Luger
Most Popular Wrestler of the Year	Hulk Hogan
Most Hated Wrestler of the Year	Earthquake
Most Improved Wrestler of the Year	Paul Roma
Inspirational Wrestler of the Year	Sting
Rookie of the Year	Steve Austin
Manager of the Year	Teddy Long
Editor's Award (Lifetime Achievement)	Buddy Rogers

=== Wrestling Observer Newsletter ===
Category	Winner
Wrestler of the Year	Ric Flair
Most Outstanding	Jushin Thunder Liger
Feud of the Year	Mitsuharu Misawa vs. Jumbo Tsuruta
Tag Team of the Year	The Steiner Brothers (Rick Steiner and Scott Steiner)
Most Improved	Kenta Kobashi
Best on Interviews	Arn Anderson

== Title changes ==
=== WWF ===
WWF World Heavyweight Championship
Incoming champion – Hulk Hogan
Date	Winner	Event/Show	Note(s)
April 1	The Ultimate Warrior	WrestleMania VI	This was a title vs. title match, with Warrior's Intercontinental Championship also on the line.

WWF Intercontinental Championship
Incoming champion – The Ultimate Warrior
Date	Winner	Event/Show	Note(s)
April 1	Vacated	WrestleMania VI	Warrior vacated the title after defeating Hulk Hogan in a title vs. title match to win the WWF Championship.
April 23	Mr. Perfect	Superstars	Defeated Tito Santana in a tournament final to win the vacant title. Aired on tape delay on May 19.
August 27	The Texas Tornado	SummerSlam	
November 19	Mr. Perfect	Superstars	Aired on tape delay on December 15, 1990.

WWF Women's Championship
Incoming champion – Rockin' Robin
Date	Winner	Event/Show	Note(s)
February 21	Deactivated	N/A	

WWF Tag Team Championship
Incoming champions – The Colossal Connection (Andre the Giant and Haku)
Date	Winner	Event/Show	Note(s)
April 1	Demolition (Ax, Smash and Crush)	WrestleMania VI	
August 27	The Hart Foundation (Bret Hart and Jim Neidhart)	SummerSlam	
October 30	The Rockers (Shawn Michaels and Marty Jannetty)	The Main Event IV	

Million Dollar Championship
Incoming champion – Ted DiBiase
unsanctioned championship
Date	Winner	Event/Show	Note(s)
No title changes

== Debuts ==
=== Debut date ===
- January 17 - Yukihide Ueno and Ryo Miyake
- January 13 – Tatanka
- February 12 - Lee Gak Soo(이각수) (FMW)
- February 22 - Masao Orihara
- March 10 - Kim Hyun Hwan (FMW)
- March 15 - Ultraman Robin
- March 27 - Hiroaki Hatanaka
- May 12 - Flying Kid Ichihara
- May 19 – El Gigante
- June 9 - J.T. Smith
- July 21 - Akemi Torisu (All Japan Women's)
- July 22 - Shooter Niiyama
- August 13 - Takaku Fuke
- September 21 – Tomoko Watanabe
- October 2 – Chris Jericho
- October 10 - Numacchi (All Japan Women's)
- November 1 – Mikiko Futagami (JWP) and Sumiko Saito (JWP)
- December 20 - Kintaro Kanemura
- December 22 - Bad Nurse Nakamura

=== Uncertain debut date ===
- Bill DeMott
- Sweet Saraya
- Debbie Malenko
- Ray González
- Marc Mero
- The Gambler
- Big Vito
- Buff Bagwell
- Shiho Tsubaki (All Japan Women)

== Retirements ==
- Otto Wanz (1968–1990)
- Frenchy Martin (1971–1990)
- Ann Casey (1962–1990)
- Nick Kiniski (1985–1990)
- Ole Anderson (1967–1990)
- Ray Candy (1973–1990)
- Raymond Rougeau (1971–1990)
- Ron Hutchison (1983–1990)
- Scott Casey (1970–1990)
- Seiji Sakaguchi (August 5, 1967 – March 15, 1990)
- Soldat Ustinov (1985-October 25, 1990)
- Uncle Elmer (1960–1990)
- Lou Thesz (1932–December 26, 1990)
- Les Thornton (1957–1990)
- Chuck Austin (1990)

== Births ==
- January 7 - Jack Gallagher
- January 14 – Kacy Catanzaro, American female wrestler
- January 23 - Alex Silva, Canadian wrestler
- February 21 - Ricky Saints
- March 1 – Dominic Garrini, American wrestler
- March 6 – Demitrius Bronson, American wrestler
- March 7 – Chase Owens, American wrestler
- March 15 – Jordan Devlin
- March 24 – Lacey Evans, American female wrestler
- April 2 – Sawyer Fulton, American wrestler
- April 6 – Hektor Invictus, German wrestler
- April 30 – Tomahawk T.T., Japanese wrestler
- May 1 - Ace Romero
- May 2 - Mahabali Shera
- May 25 – Bo Dallas
- May 31 - Montez Ford
- June 27 – Kimber Lee
- July 6 –
  - Puma, Mexican luchador
  - Musashi
- July 8 – Axel Dieter Jr.
- July 15 - Karl Fredericks
- July 18
  - Golden Magic, Mexican luchador
  - Mandy Rose, American female wrestler
- July 21 – Fabian Aichner, Italian wrestler
- July 24 –
  - Angelo Dawkins, American wrestler
  - Tucker Knight
- August 8 - Zack Gibson, English wrestler
- August 15 – Diamante, American female wrestler
- August 17 - Danhausen
- September 15 – Titán, Mexican luchador
- September 18 – Herodes Jr., Mexican luchador
- September 26 – Eterno, Mexican luchador
- September 30
  - Isaiah Swerve Scott
  - Toru Sugiura
- October 2 - Barbi Hayden
- October 14 – Raquel Diaz, American retired professional wrestler
- October 17 – Mahabali Shera, Indian wrestler
- November 9 – Robin, Mexican luchador
- November 19 – Otis Cogar
- December 27 – Zelina Vega, American female wrestler
- December 30 – Fenix, Mexican luchador enmascarado

== Deaths ==
- January 7 – Bronko Nagurski, American football player and wrestler (born 1908)
- February 4 – Whipper Billy Watson, Canadian wrestler (born 1915)
- February 15 - Mark Tendler (born 1932)
- March 2 – Ivan Gomes (born 1939)
- April 18 – Gory Guerrero, American wrestler (born 1921)
- July 7 - Chief Little Eagle, American wrestler (born 1935)
- August 15 – Pat O'Connor, New Zealand wrestler (born 1924)
- August 31 – Bert Assirati, British wrestler (born 1908)
- September 30 - Al Lolotai, Western Samoan football player and wrestler (born 1920)
- November 21 – Dean Hart, Canadian music promoter and wrestling referee (born 1954)
- December 9 – Mike Mazurki, American actor and wrestler (born 1907)
- December 31 – Ed Gantner, American wrestler (born 1959)

== See also ==
- List of WCW pay-per-view events
- List of WWF pay-per-view events
- List of FMW supercards and pay-per-view events
