= Starrcade '89: Future Shock =

1989 World Championship Wrestling pay-per-view event

- DVD cover featuring Sting.
- Promotion(s): National Wrestling Alliance; World Championship Wrestling
- Date: December 13, 1989
- City: Atlanta, Georgia
- Venue: The Omni
- Attendance: 10,000
- Buy rate: 130,000
- Tagline: Future Shock

Pay-per-view chronology
| ← Previous; Halloween Havoc | Next → WrestleWar |

Starrcade chronology
| ← Previous; 1988 | Next → 1990 |

Starrcade '89: Future Shock was the seventh annual Starrcade professional wrestling pay-per-view (PPV) event produced under the National Wrestling Alliance (NWA) banner. It was the second Starrcade event produced by World Championship Wrestling (WCW), and it took place on December 13, 1989, at The Omni in Atlanta, Georgia.

The event solely featured the Iron Man and Iron Team tournaments. The participants were Sting, Lex Luger, Ric Flair and The Great Muta for the Iron Man tournament, and Doom, The Steiner Brothers, The Road Warriors and The New Wild Samoans (replacing The Skyscrapers due to Sid Vicious' injury) for the Iron Team tournament. This event varied from other Starrcade events by only featuring the tournaments, only showcasing a small amount of wrestlers, and not featuring title defenses. The event led to a feud between Sting and Flair after a brief alliance as members of the Four Horsemen stable.

== Storylines ==
The event featured wrestlers from pre-existing scripted feuds and storylines. Wrestlers portrayed villains, heroes, or less distinguishable characters in the scripted events that built tension and culminated in a wrestling match or series of matches.

In February 1988, Sting was given a push to main event status by placing him in a feud with Ric Flair and Four Horsemen. This continued until October 1988, when Sting began a feud with The Road Warriors. Throughout 1989, Flair had notable feuds with Ricky Steamboat and Terry Funk over the NWA World Heavyweight Championship while Sting feuded with The Great Muta over the NWA World Television Championship. At The Great American Bash in July, the alliance between Flair and Sting began. After Flair defeated Funk in the main event, he was attacked by The Great Muta, and Sting came out to help Flair. Sting and Flair feuded with The Great Muta and Funk afterwards, and the feud continued until Halloween Havoc in October, when they defeated The Great Muta and Funk in a Thunderdome match.

== Event ==
Other on-screen personnel
| Role: | Name: |
|---|---|
| Commentators | Jim Ross |
| Commentators | Terry Funk |
| Commentators | Jim Cornette |
| Interviewer | Gordon Solie |
| Referee | Nick Patrick |
| Ring announcer | Gary Michael Cappetta |

The first match was between Doom (Ron Simmons and Butch Reed) (accompanied by Woman and Nitron) and The Steiner Brothers (Rick Steiner and Scott Steiner). The Steiners had the early advantage over Doom until Scott missed a clothesline, and sent himself outside the ring, where Nitron attacked him. Doom had the advantage until Scott fought back, and performed a belly to belly suplex. Rick and Simmons tagged in, and Rick had the advantage until Nitron pulled Rick outside the ring. Rick performed a clothesline to Nitron, and both teams fought outside. Rick returned to the ring in time for Simmons to be counted out, and the Steiner Brothers won the match.

The second match was between Sting and Lex Luger. Sting gained the early advantage, and performed a diving crossbody. Sting attempted another diving crossbody, but Luger caught him, and performed an inverted atomic drop. Luger had the advantage, and they fought outside the ring. As both were on the apron, Luger pulled them both over the top rope and into the ring. Luger fell on top of Sting, and pinned him while holding the rope, and having his foot on the rope.

The third match was between The Road Warriors (Hawk and Animal) and Doom. The Road Warriors had the early advantage until Hawk missed a shoulder block to Reed in the corner. Doom had the advantage over Hawk, with Reed performing a diving elbow drop and a flying clothesline. Hawk countered a body slam attempt and tagged in Animal. Animal and Reed went back and forth. Animal hit Reed with a powerslam and Simmons entered the ring to break up the count. A two-on-two brawl ensued and just as Reed was about to perform his piledriver on Animal, Hawk performed a flying clothesline that knocked him on his back. Animal then pinned Reed to win the match.

The fourth match was between The Great Muta and Ric Flair (accompanied by Ole and Arn Anderson). The Great Muta was being heralded as unpinned at this point in his WCW career. The match started with The Great Muta having the advantage. After a handspring back elbow from The Great Muta, Flair fought back, and applied an atomic drop and the figure four leglock. Buzz Sawyer and The Dragonmaster came down to help The Great Muta, but the Andersons fought them off. The distraction allowed The Great Muta to gain the advantage, and he attempted a moonsault, but Flair raised his knees. Flair then pinned The Great Muta with an inside cradle to win the match.

The fifth match was between the Steiner Brothers and the Road Warriors. The match started back and forth until the Road Warriors had the advantage over Scott. Scott fought back with a super belly to belly suplex, but failed to gain the advantage. Animal and Hawk performed a combination of a bridging belly to back suplex and a clothesline. The suplex resulted in Scott pinning Animal, and the Steiner Brothers won the match.

The sixth match was between The Great Muta and Sting. The match started back and forth until The Great Muta performed an eye rake, and applied the bridging grounded double chickenwing. The Great Muta kept the advantage, and attempted a moonsault. Sting avoided it, but The Great Muta landed on his feet, and performed a spin kick. The Great Muta climbed the turnbuckles, but Sting performed a dropkick and a superplex. Sting then pinned The Great Muta to win the match.

The seventh match was between The New Wild Samoans (Samoan Savage and Fatu) (accompanied by The Big Kahuna) and Doom. The match started back and forth between Reed and Fatu. Savage and Simmons tagged in, and Simmons gained the advantage after avoiding a diving headbutt. Doom kept the advantage until Simmons missed a diving shoulder block. Fatu and Reed tagged in, and Fatu performed a flying headbutt. After an Irish whip from Reed, their heads collided. Reed fell down, and Fatu was dazed. The Big Kahuna pushed Fatu onto Reed, and Fatu pinned him to win the match.

The eighth match was between Lex Luger and Ric Flair. The match started back and forth until Flair performed several knife edge chops in the corner. Flair kept the advantage until Luger sent Flair's head into the top turnbuckle. Luger continued to attack Flair until Flair avoided an elbow drop, and applied the figure four leglock. The time limit expired while Flair had the hold applied, and the match ended in a draw.

The ninth match was between The New Wild Samoans and the Steiner Brothers. The match started back and forth until Savage kicked Scott in the face, and threw him outside the ring, where Fatu attacked him. The New Wild Samoans had the advantage over Scott until Scott fought back with a Frankensteiner to Fatu. After Scott avoided a big splash from Savage, Rick and Fatu came in without being tagged, and Rick attacked both. Fatu ran at Scott, and Scott sent him over the top rope. Scott was disqualified for doing so, and The New Wild Samoans won the match.

The tenth match was between The Great Muta and Lex Luger. The Great Muta had the early advantage by targeting Luger's injured left leg, applying the single leg Boston crab and the Muta Lock. Luger fought back, and performed a scoop powerslam, but failed to apply the Torture Rack. The Great Muta then spit green mist in Luger's face, and Luger won the match by disqualification.

The eleventh match was between The New Wild Samoans and the Road Warriors. The match started with the Road Warriors having the advantage. Savage performed an inverted atomic drop and a back body drop to Hawk, but failed to gain the advantage. Fatu gained the advantage after performing a headbutt to Animal's midsection. Savage tagged in, and applied the chinlock after several attacks. He then missed a corner slingshot splash, and Hawk tagged in. Hawk performed a flying shoulder block, and all four came in and fought. Animal knocked Fatu off the top turnbuckle, and Hawk performed a flying clothesline to Savage. Hawk then pinned Savage to win the match and the Iron Team tournament.

Sting became a member of the Four Horsemen after Starrcade

The main event was between Sting and Ric Flair. The match started back and forth until Flair threw Sting outside the ring. Flair sent Sting into the guard rail, and back in the ring with a delayed vertical suplex. Flair continued with a knee drop and a double underhook suplex. Sting performed a clothesline out of the corner, and Flair rolled out of the ring. Sting had the advantage with a suplex into the ring and mounted punches. After a Stinger splash, Sting applied the Scorpion Deathlock, but Flair reached the ropes. Flair performed a shin breaker, and applied the figure four leglock, but Sting reached the ropes. Flair then targeted Sting's left leg. Flair performed a shin breaker and a seated senton onto the leg. Flair then attempted the figure four leglock, but Sting countered it into an inside cradle, and pinned Flair to win the match and the Iron Man tournament.

== Aftermath ==
The alliance between Ric Flair and Sting led to the reformation of the Four Horsemen stable with Flair, Sting, Ole Anderson and Arn Anderson. However, Sting was awarded a match with Flair for the NWA World Heavyweight Championship at WrestleWar '90: Wild Thing for winning the Iron Man tournament. Flair feared losing the title, and this led to Sting being kicked out of the Four Horsemen on February 6 at Clash of the Champions X when he chose to accept the title match against the wishes of Flair and the Andersons. Later that night, Sting tore his left patella tendon in an attempt to attack Flair, and the injury put Sting out of action for the following five months. Lex Luger was chosen to replace Sting in the title match at WrestleWar. After Sting returned, he defeated Flair, and won the title at The Great American Bash.

The Great Muta, after suffering three losses in the Iron Man Tournament, two by clean pinfall, would lose his WCW World Television Title to Arn Anderson, then leave WCW for Japan after the Clash of Champions X in February, 1990. Doom would be forced to unmask at the same event after losing a match to the Steiner Brothers, then would exact revenge by defeating Rick and Scott Steiner for the WCW World Tag Team Championship at Capital Combat. Despite winning the Iron Man Tag Team Tournament, the Road Warriors would be forced down the card, then left WCW for the WWF after appearing in the Capital Combat PPV. The New Wild Samoans would also leave WCW in mid-1990 and would eventually turn up in the WWF as The Headshrinkers.

== Home media and streaming ==
The event was released on home video in the United States and the United Kingdom by Turner Home Entertainment. In the UK, it was released in 1992, almost three years after it had been broadcast. It was one of the first WCW home videos to be released in the UK. The event was edited down to a little over two hours and while all of the matches are covered, not all are shown in full.

In 2014, the event was included on the WWE's streaming platform the WWE Network as part of its launch and remained on the service until the platform closed in 2026. In December 2025, WWE uploaded the event to stream freely on their WCW YouTube channel.

== Results ==
| No. | Results | Stipulations | Times |
|---|---|---|---|
| 1 | The Steiner Brothers (Rick and Scott) defeated Doom (Doom #1 and Doom #2) (with Woman and Nitron) by countout | Tag team match | 12:24 |
| 2 | Lex Luger defeated Sting | Singles match | 11:31 |
| 3 | The Road Warriors (Hawk and Animal) (with Paul Ellering) defeated Doom (Doom #1 and Doom #2) (with Woman and Nitron) | Tag team match | 08:31 |
| 4 | Ric Flair (with Ole Anderson and Arn Anderson) defeated The Great Muta (with Gary Hart) | Singles match | 01:55 |
| 5 | The Steiner Brothers (Rick and Scott) defeated The Road Warriors (Hawk and Animal) (with Paul Ellering) | Tag team match | 07:27 |
| 6 | Sting defeated The Great Muta (with Gary Hart) | Singles match | 08:41 |
| 7 | The New Wild Samoans (Samoan Savage and Fatu) (with The Big Kahuna) defeated Doom (Doom #1 and Doom #2) (with Woman and Nitron) | Tag team match | 08:22 |
| 8 | Ric Flair vs. Lex Luger ended in a time-limit draw | Singles match | 17:15 |
| 9 | The New Wild Samoans (Samoan Savage and Fatu) (with The Big Kahuna) defeated The Steiner Brothers (Rick and Scott) by disqualification | Tag team match | 14:05 |
| 10 | Lex Luger defeated The Great Muta (with Gary Hart) by disqualification | Singles match | 14:15 |
| 11 | The Road Warriors (Hawk and Animal) (with Paul Ellering) defeated The New Wild Samoans (Samoan Savage and Fatu) (with The Big Kahuna) | Tag team match | 05:18 |
| 12 | Sting defeated Ric Flair | Singles match | 14:30 |

=== Tournaments ===
The Iron Man and Iron Team tournaments were round-robin tournaments featuring four competing individuals and tag teams respectively. The point system: 20 points for a pinfall or submission victory, 15 for a countout victory, 10 for a disqualification victory, 5 for a time-limit draw and 0 for a loss.

==== Iron Man tournament ====
| | Sting | Luger | Flair | Muta | Total |
|---|---|---|---|---|---|
| Sting | * | 0 | 20 | 20 | 40 |
| Lex Luger | 20 | * | 5 | 10 | 35 |
| Ric Flair | 0 | 5 | * | 20 | 25 |
| The Great Muta | 0 | 0 | 0 | * | 0 |

==== Iron Team tournament ====
| | Warriors | Steiners | Samoans | Doom | Total |
|---|---|---|---|---|---|
| The Road Warriors | * | 0 | 20 | 20 | 40 |
| The Steiner Brothers | 20 | * | 0 | 15 | 35 |
| The New Wild Samoans | 0 | 10 | * | 20 | 30 |
| Doom | 0 | 0 | 0 | * | 0 |
