= WrestleWar =

WCW pay-per-view

- Promotions: World Championship Wrestling
- First event: WrestleWar '89: Music City Showdown
- Last event: WrestleWar (1992)

WrestleWar was a professional wrestling pay-per-view event series promoted by World Championship Wrestling (WCW). It was held in May in 1989 and 1992 and February in 1990 and 1991. The first two events were promoted under the National Wrestling Alliance banner, the final two under the WCW name. The final two events also featured the WarGames match, which had previously been held during The Great American Bash and continued to be held at other events following the cancellation of this pay-per-view.

In 1993, WCW held SuperBrawl III in February and the first ever Slamboree show in May, which replaced the WrestleWar show on the schedule from that point until WCW closed in 2001. After WCW closed all rights to their television and PPV shows were bought by WWE, including the WrestleWar shows. With the launch of the WWE Network in 2014 all WrestleWar shows became available on demand for network subscribers.

== Dates, venues, and main events ==
Event	Date	City	Venue	Main event	Ref.
National Wrestling Alliance/World Championship Wrestling
WrestleWar '89: Music City Showdown	May 7, 1989	Nashville, Tennessee	Nashville Municipal Auditorium	Eddie Gilbert and Rick Steiner (c) vs. Varsity Club (Dan Spivey and Kevin Sullivan) for the NWA United States Tag Team Championship	
WrestleWar '90: Wild Thing	February 25, 1990	Greensboro, North Carolina	Greensboro Coliseum	Ric Flair (c) vs. Lex Luger for the NWA World Heavyweight Championship	
World Championship Wrestling
WrestleWar '91	February 24, 1991	Phoenix, Arizona	Arizona Veterans Memorial Coliseum	WarGames match: The Four Horsemen (Ric Flair, Barry Windham and Sid Vicious) and Larry Zbyszko vs. Sting, Brian Pillman, and The Steiner Brothers (Rick Steiner and Scott Steiner)	
WrestleWar (1992)	May 17, 1992	Jacksonville, Florida	Jacksonville Memorial Coliseum	WarGames match: Sting's Squadron (Sting, Barry Windham, Dustin Rhodes, Ricky Steamboat and Nikita Koloff) vs. The Dangerous Alliance (Steve Austin, Rick Rude, Arn Anderson, Bobby Eaton and Larry Zbyszko)	
(c) – refers to the champion(s) heading into the match
