= Capital Combat =

1990 World Championship Wrestling pay-per-view event

- Advertisement for the show including The Road Warriors also featuring an ad for RoboCop 2
- Promotion(s): National Wrestling Alliance; World Championship Wrestling
- Date: May 19, 1990
- City: Washington, D.C.
- Venue: D.C. Armory
- Attendance: 7,500
- Buy rate: 160,000
- Tagline: Return of Robocop

Pay-per-view chronology
← Previous; WrestleWar	Next → The Great American Bash

Capital Combat: Return of RoboCop was a one-time professional wrestling pay-per-view (PPV) event from the National Wrestling Alliance (NWA) held under the World Championship Wrestling (WCW) name. Capital Combat took place on Saturday, May 19, 1990, at the D.C. Armory in Washington, D.C. The show featured a promotional crossover with the imminent release of RoboCop 2, with RoboCop rescuing Sting from an attack by the Four Horsemen during the PPV.

The main event of the show was a steel cage match with Ric Flair defending the NWA World Heavyweight Championship against Lex Luger. On the undercard, The Steiner Brothers (Rick Steiner and Scott Steiner) defended the NWA World Tag Team Championship against Doom (Ron Simmons and Butch Reed) while Brian Pillman and Tom Zenk defended the NWA United States Tag Team Championship against the Midnight Express (Bobby Eaton and Stan Lane). The show included five additional matches.

== Production ==
=== Background ===
In 1989, World Championship Wrestling (WCW) held their first pay-per-view (PPV) in May when they held the first WrestleWar event. In 1990, WrestleWar was held in February, with WCW instead opting to hold a different event in May. This PPV event, held at the D.C. Armory in Washington, D.C., was named "Capital Combat" in light of it being held in the capital city of the United States. Due to a printing error on the tickets, the starting time for the show was listed as 8 PM instead of 7 PM, leading to the first couple of matches taking place in front of a half-full arena. The event ended up drawing 7,500 paid spectators, not quite filling the 10,000-seat arena but close to capacity since part of the seats were blocked by the sets and ring ramp. The first three matches on the show were not included when Turner Home Entertainment later released the show on VHS cassette, editing the show down to fit a two-hour format. The first three matches were not made available to the general public until the WWE Network was launched in 2014 and the full Capital Combat show became available to subscribers.

WCW had originally intended to have the Samoan Swat Team (Fatu and Samu) wrestle for the NWA United States Tag Team Championship, facing champions Flyin' Brian Pillman and "Z-Man" Tom Zenk at the show. When the Samoan Swat Team did not show up for the television taping on April 9, where they were supposed to film the beginnings of the storyline that would lead to the match, WCW replaced them with The Midnight Express (Bobby Eaton and Stan Lane) instead.

=== Storylines ===
The event featured wrestlers from pre-existing scripted feuds and storylines. Wrestlers portrayed villains, heroes, or less distinguishable characters in the scripted events that built tension and culminated in a wrestling match or series of matches.

The main storyline leading up to Capital Combat, and the main storyline in WCW at the time revolved around Four Horsemen stable and the Faces (those that portray the "good guys") of WCW. At Clash of the Champions X on February 6, 1990, the Four Horsemen (Ric Flair, Arn Anderson, and Ole Anderson) turned on Sting, attacking him and kicking him out of the Horsemen because he accepted an NWA World Heavyweight Championship match against Ric Flair. In the ensuing fight Sting suffered a knee injury which required surgery. Due to the injury, the plans for WCW's 1990 WrestleWar PPV had to be changed drastically, with NWA United States Champion Lex Luger, a former friend of Sting's, receiving the championship match instead. During the main event, Luger had Flair locked in his submission hold, looking like he was about to win the match and the championship. At that point the Andersons cornered Sting, who was on crutches after his surgery, threatening to injure him even further. At that point Luger abandoned the match, opting to save his long time friend instead even though it cost him the match and the championship. In the weeks following WrestleWar WCW officials announced that Lex Luger would receive another opportunity to wrestle for the NWA World Heavyweight Championship in the main event of Capital Combat, this time in a steel cage match to prevent the Four Horsemen from interfering. In the weeks leading up to Capital Combat, the Horsemen introduced both Barry Windham and Sid Vicious as part of their group, with Ole Anderson acting more as a manager from that point on.

== Event ==
Other on-screen personnel
Role:	Name:
Commentators	Jim Ross
Commentators	Bob Caudle
Ring announcers	Gary Michael Cappetta
Ring announcers	Missy Hyatt (Hair vs. Hair match)
Interviewers	Tony Schiavone
Interviewers	Gordon Solie
Referees	Randy Anderson
Referees	Nick Patrick
Referees	Mike Adkins

Jim Ross and Bob Caudle served as the announcers for the match while Tony Schiavone (who just returned to the NWA from the World Wrestling Federation) and Gordon Solie providing additional on screen announcing, either from backstage or in the ring. For the first match of the night, both members of the Road Warriors (Animal and Hawk) were driven to the ring on the back of Harley Davidson motorcycles while their tag team partner Norman came out on a Kick scooter to the ring. The six-man tag team match against Kevin Sullivan, Cactus Jack and Bam Bam Bigelow ended when Road Warrior Hawk leaped off the top rope, striking Kevin Sullivan with a flying clothesline, resulting in a pinfall victory for the team.

Teddy Long accompanied "Mean" Mark Callous to the ring for the second match, despite being scheduled to wrestle himself later in the night. The match against Johnny Ace ended after just over 10 minutes of wrestling when Callous hit Johnny Ace with a Heart Punch, followed by the 6 ft 10 in (2.08 m) Callous climbing the turnbuckles, then walking across the top rope to land an elbow drop on Ace to win the match. In the third match of the night the Samoan Swat Team (Fatu and Samoan Savage) defeated the team of Tommy Rich and Mike Rotunda in 17 minutes and 55 seconds.

The fourth match of the night carried a special stipulation, the loser of the match would be shaved bald as a result. Managers Theodore R. Long and Paul Ellering faced off in the special attraction match. Long came to the ring wearing boxing gloves, boxing headgear and was announced as "Sugar Ray" Long. During the opening moments of the match, Long hit Ellering with one of his gloves, with Ellering selling the impact like the glove was loaded. Moments later Ellering took the glove away from Long, then hit Long with his own glove to knock him out. Three seconds later and Theodore R. Long was forced to have his hair shaved off by hairstylist Jay Tapper who was at ringside. Manager Jim Cornette was forced to be confined in a steel cage located at ringside while his team, the Midnight Express, wrestled against Brian Pillman and Tom Zenk. With Cornette locked in the cage, he was unable to help his team or get physically involved like he normally would. The over 20 minute long match ended after Stan Lane kicked Zenk in the back of the head, sending him into an inside cradle pinning hold by Bobby Eaton to secure the victory and the championship.

After the United States Tag Team Championship match Gordon Solie reported from backstage that RoboCop had arrived at the building, followed by RoboCop and Sting entering the arena moments later. During the segment the Four Horsemen came to ringside to attack Sting, locking him in the steel cage that Jim Cornette had been confined to earlier in the night. Moments later RoboCop ran off the Horsemen and then pulled the door off the steel cage to release Sting. The sixth match of the night, a tag team match between The Rock 'n' Roll Express (Ricky Morton and Robert Gibson) and The Freebirds (Michael Hayes and Jimmy Garvin) was billed as a "Corporal Punishment" match. The "Corporal Punishment" stipulation meant that each team was given a three-foot-long leather strap they were allowed to use during the match. The straps themselves were not widely used during the match as both teams opted to wrestle the match as a straight match with only a few moments of actual whipping. In the end, Morton rolled up Michael Hayes to win the match.

When Theodore Long returned to the arena after his earlier loss he had his head covered by a bandana to hide the fact that he had all his hair shaved off. Long played a very minor role in the match as his team of Doom (Ron Simmons and Butch Reed) wrestled the NWA World Tag Team Champions The Steiner Brothers (Rick Steiner and Scott Steiner) for the championship. The match ended with a victory for Doom in 19 minutes and 13 seconds after Simmons hit Rick Steiner in the back, allowing Reed to pin Steiner for the victory and the championship.

The steel cage used for the main event was not the traditional type of cage that was attached to the actual ring itself, but was oversized and stood on the floor around the ring without a door to ensure no one could get in or out once the cage had been lowered in place (a possible precursor for WWE's Hell in a Cell). Flair was accompanied by the Horsemen's manager Woman who was allowed inside the cage. During the referee's pre-match check he discovered that Woman had an illegal object hidden in her glove, which he proceeded to confiscate prior to the match starting and ejected her from the cage. Late in the match, Luger had Flair in a vulnerable position as he had the champion locked in his Torture Rack submission hold. At that point of the match, the cage was raised up enough for Barry Windham to enter the ring and attack Luger to cause a disqualification, allowing Flair to remain champion. Moments later Sting came back to the arena to help fight off the Four Horsemen, soon joined by the 7 ft 7 in (2.31 m) tall El Gigante who was making his first appearance on a WCW show.

== Reception ==
The segment with RoboCop saving Sting has often been cited as one of the worst moments in WCW's history and one of the events that inspired the creation of the website WrestleCrap. Later reviews of the event covered the Turner Home Video version that did not include the first three matches, something Scott Keith described as leaving "two hours of good matches". In a 2008 review J.D. Dunn rated the event as 8.5 out of 10, stating "Most people remember this for the laughable Robocop segments, but the wrestling was stellar on this show". The main event match was later included in WWE's "The Greatest Cage Matches of All Time" DVD that was released in 2011.

== Aftermath ==
After recovering from his knee injury Sting received his championship match against Ric Flair at the 1990 Great American Bash where Sting won the NWA World Heavyweight Championship for the first time. Sting, Luger, El Gigante and others continued the feud with the Four Horsemen over the next year, ending in 1991 when the Four Horsemen disbanded as Ric Flair (at the time the first WCW World Heavyweight Champion) and Sid Vicious left WCW. Ric Flair left due to a contract dispute with Jim Herd (Booker at the time), along with the fact that Herd wanted Flair to cut his hair, wear a diamond earring, and call himself Spartacus. This was the reason when Flair showed up in the WWF shortly thereafter he had short hair. Ric Flair also took the WCW World Championship with him to the WWF, proclaiming himself the “Real World Heavyweight Champion”. The reason he did this was when a champion held a title belt, they had to put a cash deposit down on the belt while champion, and when Jim Herd did not renew Flair's contract, he never repaid him the deposit Flair put down on the WCW World Championship. Therefore, since Flair never received his deposit back, he technically owned the belt, and took it with him to the WWF in the fall of 1991. Because of this, Jim Herd declared the WCW World Championship vacant, and held a match at The Great American Bash between the two top contenders for the now vacant World Title between the current United States Heavyweight Champion Lex Luger and Barry Windham, resulting in a double turn where Luger won the WCW World Championship under nefarious means, becoming a heel in the process, while Barry Windham became a Babyface.

The PPV was the last televised match in North America for Johnny Ace. Ace later worked for All Japan Pro Wrestling and, after retiring from in-ring competition, end up working behind the scenes and on-screen in WWE under his real name, John Laurinaitis.

The Road Warriors left WCW after this PPV, moving on to the WWF and calling themselves by their alternate name "The Legion of Doom" but not bring their longtime manager Paul Ellering with them for their initial WWF run, and soon feuded with the "Road Warrior Clones" Demolition. The Rock and Roll Express were no longer a team after Robert Gibson injured his ACL in a house show match against Doom in September and Ricky Morton began a solo career, eventually turning heel to join The York Foundation as "Richard Morton".

Ironically, this also featured the last match for Mean Mark Callous (Mark Callaway) in WCW before he went signed on to the WWE and became the most active person in history, and had a career spanning over 30 years as The Undertaker and now currently is the booker for AAA and a coach.

== Home media and streaming ==
The event was released on home video in the United States and the United Kingdom by Turner Home Entertainment. In the UK, it was released in the summer of 1992, two years after the event. The event was edited down to two hours and the first three matches were cut in their entirety.

In 2014, the event was included on the WWE's streaming platform the WWE Network as part of its launch and remained on the service until the platform closed in 2026. In May 2025, WWE uploaded the event to stream freely on their WCW YouTube channel.

== Results ==
No.	Results	Stipulations	Times
1	Norman the Lunatic and The Road Warriors (Hawk and Animal) (with Paul Ellering) defeated Kevin Sullivan, Cactus Jack and Bam Bam Bigelow (with Oliver Humperdink)	Six-man tag team match	9:38
2	Mean Mark (with Teddy Long) defeated Johnny Ace	Singles match	10:41
3	The Samoan SWAT Team (Fatu and The Samoan Savage) defeated Tommy Rich and Mike Rotunda	Tag team match	17:54
4	Paul Ellering defeated Teddy Long	Hair vs. Hair match	1:57
5	The Midnight Express (Bobby Eaton and Stan Lane) defeated Brian Pillman and Tom Zenk (c)	Tag team match for the NWA United States Tag Team Championship	20:20
6	The Rock 'n' Roll Express (Ricky Morton and Robert Gibson) defeated The Fabulous Freebirds (Michael Hayes and Jimmy Garvin)	Corporal Punishment match	18:33
7	Doom (Ron Simmons and Butch Reed) (with Teddy Long) defeated the Steiner Brothers (Rick Steiner and Scott Steiner) (c)	Tag team match for the NWA World Tag Team Championship	19:14
8	Lex Luger defeated Ric Flair (c) (with Woman) by disqualification	Steel cage match for the NWA World Heavyweight Championship	17:21
(c) / – the champion(s) heading into the match

== See also ==
- 1990 in professional wrestling
- Jim Crockett Promotions
