= WrestleWar '89: Music City Showdown =

1989 World Championship Wrestling pay-per-view event

- VHS cover featuring Sting, Ricky Steamboat, Lex Luger and The Road Warriors
- Promotion(s): National Wrestling Alliance; World Championship Wrestling
- Date: May 7, 1989
- City: Nashville, Tennessee
- Venue: Nashville Municipal Auditorium
- Attendance: 5,200
- Buy rate: 120,000

Pay-per-view chronology
← Previous; Chi-Town Rumble	Next → The Great American Bash

WrestleWar chronology
← Previous; First	Next → 1990

WrestleWar '89: Music City Showdown was the first WrestleWar professional wrestling pay-per-view (PPV) event produced by World Championship Wrestling (WCW) under the National Wrestling Alliance (NWA) banner. It took place on May 7, 1989 from the Nashville Municipal Auditorium in Nashville, Tennessee.

The main event was a tag team match between Eddie Gilbert and Rick Steiner and The Varsity Club (Kevin Sullivan and Dan Spivey) for the NWA United States Tag Team Championship. Gilbert and Steiner defeated Sullivan and Spivey to retain the titles when Gilbert pinned Sullivan.

Featured matches on the undercard were The Varsity Club (Mike Rotunda and Steve Williams) versus Road Warriors (Hawk and Animal) for the NWA World Tag Team Championship, Ric Flair versus Ricky Steamboat for the NWA World Heavyweight Championship, Sting versus The Iron Sheik for the NWA World Television Championship, Michael Hayes versus Lex Luger for the NWA United States Heavyweight Championship, Dynamic Dudes (Shane Douglas and Johnny Ace) versus The Samoan SWAT Team (Samu and Fatu), Dick Murdoch versus Bob Orton, Jr. in a bullrope match and The Great Muta versus Doug Gilbert. Country music group The Oak Ridge Boys performed an 8-song mini-concert at the event.

== Storylines ==
WrestleWar featured nine professional wrestling matches that involved wrestlers from pre-existing rivalries, plots and storylines that were played out on World Wide Wrestling, Pro and World Championship Wrestling–WCW's television programs. Wrestlers portrayed a hero, villain or a tweener as they followed a series of events that built tension, and culminated in a wrestling match or a series of matches.

The main rivalry heading into the event was between Ricky Steamboat and Ric Flair for the NWA World Heavyweight Championship. At Chi-Town Rumble, Steamboat defeated Flair to win the title. On April 2 Clash of the Champions VI, Steamboat defeated Flair in a Two out of three falls match to retain the title. However, Flair's foot was on the bottom rope during the ending of the third fall. As a result, it was announced on April 9 edition of Main Event that a rematch would take place between the two for the title at WrestleWar.

The main tag team rivalry heading into the event was between Varsity Club (Mike Rotunda and Steve Williams) and Road Warriors (Hawk and Animal) for the NWA World Tag Team Championship. At Chi-Town Rumble, Road Warriors defeated Club members Kevin Sullivan and Steve Williams to retain the titles. On April 2 edition of Clash of the Champions VI, Road Warriors lost the title to Club members Mike Rotunda and Williams with the help of referee Teddy Long, who favoured Rotunda and Williams. On April 15 edition of World Championship Wrestling, it was announced that Rotunda and Williams would defend the titles against Road Warriors in a rematch at WrestleWar.

Another predominant tag team rivalry heading into the event pitted the team of Eddie Gilbert and Rick Steiner against Varsity Club (Kevin Sullivan and Dan Spivey) for the NWA United States Tag Team Championship. At Chi-Town Rumble, the United States Tag Team Champions Kevin Sullivan and Steve Williams failed in their opportunity for the NWA World Tag Team Championship against Road Warriors. On March 18 edition of World Championship Wrestling, Eddie Gilbert and Rick Steiner defeated Sullivan and Williams to win the United States Tag Team Championship. On April 2 edition of Clash of the Champions VI, Gilbert and Steiner defeated Sullivan and Dan Spivey to retain the titles. This led to a title defense for Gilbert and Steiner against Sullivan and Spivey at WrestleWar.

A secondary rivalry heading into the event was between Lex Luger and Michael Hayes for the NWA United States Heavyweight Championship. At Chi-Town Rumble, Luger defeated Barry Windham to win the title. On March 18 edition of World Championship Wrestling, Luger and Hayes wrestled Barry and Kendall Windham in a tag team match. Hayes turned on Luger and allowed Barry and Kendall to win the match, thus joining Hiro Matsuda's group Yamazaki Corporation. On May 7 edition of World Championship Wrestling, it was announced that Luger would defend the United States Championship against Hayes at WrestleWar.

Another secondary rivalry heading into the event was between Sting and The Iron Sheik for the NWA World Television Championship. On February 25 edition of World Championship Wrestling, Sheik debuted in NWA and issued a challenge to top competitors of the company including Ricky Steamboat and Lex Luger. On April 1 edition of World Championship Wrestling, Sting defeated Mike Rotunda to win the NWA World Television Championship. On April 15 edition of World Championship Wrestling, Sheik challenged Sting for the Television Championship. Later that night, it was announced that Sting would defend the title against Sheik at WrestleWar.

On April 1 edition of World Championship Wrestling, Bob Orton Jr. returned to NWA and formed an alliance with Gary Hart. On April 2 edition of Clash of the Champions VI, Orton defeated Dick Murdoch with the help of Hart. This resulted in a rivalry between Orton and Murdoch, resulting in both men interfering in each other's matches. On April 29 edition of World Championship Wrestling, Murdoch announced that he would compete against Orton in a bullrope match at WrestleWar.

On March 18 edition of World Championship Wrestling, Gary Hart introduced his newest client Keiji Mutoh in NWA as The Great Muta, billed as the son of Great Kabuki. Muta began a winning streak after his debut, usually against enhancement talent. On April 22 edition of World Championship Wrestling, it was announced that Muta would wrestle Junkyard Dog at WrestleWar.

At Chi-Town Rumble, The Midnight Express (Bobby Eaton and Stan Lane) and their manager Jim Cornette defeated Original Midnight Express (Jack Victory and Randy Rose) and their manager Paul E. Dangerously in a Loser Leaves NWA match, thus forcing Original Midnight Express to quit NWA. Dangerously introduced the Samoan Swat Team (Samu and Fatu) as his new tag team to avenge the departure of Original Midnight Express from the Midnight Express. Samoan Swat Team began an undefeated streak against enhancement talent. On April 2 edition of Clash of the Champions VI, the Samoan Swat Team defeated Midnight Express and received a strong push in the tag team division. On April 29 edition of World Championship Wrestling, it was announced that Samoan Swat Team would face Dynamic Dudes (Shane Douglas and Johnny Ace) in a tag team match at WrestleWar. Dynamic Dudes made their debut a week after the announcement.

Other on-screen personnel
Role:	Name:
Commentator	Jim Ross
Commentator	Bob Caudle
Referee	Nick Patrick
Referee	Tommy Young
Interviewer	Lance Russell
Interviewer	Joe Pedicino
Ring announcer	Gary Michael Cappetta

== Event ==
=== Preliminary matches ===
The first scheduled match at the event was a standard wrestling match between Junkyard Dog and The Great Muta. Junkyard Dog did not make it to the show, so he was replaced by Doug Gilbert, the younger brother of Eddie Gilbert. Muta dominated the match and easily won the match in three minutes by pinfall using a moonsault.

The second match of the event was a standard wrestling match between Ranger Ross and Butch Reed. The match went back and forth with Ross dominating the earlier part of the match. The action spilled outside the ring until Reed ran to the ring and Ross chased him. Reed attacked Ross on the apron and brought him inside the ring to perform a suplex. Reed performed a diving shoulder block on Ross and pinned him to win the match.

The third match was a bullrope match between Dick Murdoch and Bob Orton Jr. It was a very short match in which both men exchanged momentums but in the end, Murdoch won it by hog tying Orton into the ropes and performing an elbow drop, then pinning him. After the match, Murdoch tried to attack Orton's manager Gary Hart but Orton struck Murdoch with a cowbell.

The fourth match was a tag team match between The Dynamic Dudes (Johnny Ace and Shane Douglas) and The Samoan SWAT Team (Samu and Fatu). Ace and Fatu started the match. Fatu dominated the earlier part of the match by powerslamming Ace. Samu was tagged in and he dominated Ace throughout the match. Samu used several moves on Ace and prevented him from tagging in Douglas. Samu applied a Boston Crab on Ace until Ace caught the ropes and performed a monkey flip to get out of the move. Ace finally tagged in Douglas, who dropkicked both Fatu and Samu. Fatu was tagged in and he clotheslined Douglas, followed by a Samoan Splash (diving splash). Fatu lifted Douglas in a fireman's carry, allowing Ace to hit him with a missile dropkick, enabling Douglas to pin Fatu for the victory.

The fifth match featured Lex Luger defending the NWA United States Heavyweight Championship against Michael Hayes. Luger dominated the earlier part of the match by performing his power moves on Hayes until Hayes got the momentum when Luger delivered mounted punches to Hayes in the corner but missed a charge and fell out on the ringside. Hayes attacked Luger outside the ring and got a near-fall in the ring. Luger tried to recover until Hayes' manager Hiro Matsuda interfered, allowing Hayes to apply a chinlock. Luger smashed Hayes in the turnbuckle until Hayes attacked Luger with a back elbow. Hayes tried to perform a bulldog but Luger countered. Luger performed three snap scoop powerslams and applied a Torture Rack. However, Hayes countered by performing a DDT. However, the impact of the move caused all the three men to get knocked out. Terry Gordy made a run-in into the match and put Hayes atop Luger. The referee recovered and counted the pinfall for Hayes to make him the new United States Champion.

The sixth match featured Sting defending the NWA World Television Championship against The Iron Sheik. Sheik attacked Sting before the match started until Sting gained momentum by delivering a clothesline. Sting performed a Stinger Splash in the corner then applied a Scorpion Deathlock to make Sheik submit and retain the title.

=== Main event matches ===
The main event match of the evening featured Ricky Steamboat defending the NWA World Heavyweight Championship against Ric Flair. Terry Funk, Pat O'Connor and Lou Thesz were the special judges in the match in case the match went to the full 1-hour time limit. Flair started the match by performing a shoulder block. Flair and Steamboat competed for longer than half hour and exchanged momentum throughout the match. In the final moments of the match, Steamboat delivered a superplex to Flair and applied a double chickenwing but Flair wrapped his legs into the ropes. Flair was smashed into the turnbuckle and Steamboat climbed the top rope. Flair fell into the ropes and Steamboat fell down on the floor which hurt his leg. Flair suplexed Steamboat back into the ring and began attacking his injured knee. Flair applied a figure four leglock until Steamboat caught the ropes. Flair tried to attack Steamboat's knee but Steamboat delivered a Mongolian chop and an enzuigiri. Steamboat tried to pick Flair to perform a scoop slam but his leg was hurt, allowing Flair to pin Steamboat with an inside cradle to win the title. After the match, Flair showed respect to Steamboat by shaking hands with him. One of the judges of the match, Terry Funk challenged Flair for the title but Flair turned down the title match, causing Funk to attack Flair and perform a piledriver on him through the judges table. This match by many wrestling experts is considered the best match in American history.

The eighth match was a tag team match for the NWA World Tag Team Championship. Varsity Club members Mike Rotunda and Steve Williams defended the titles against the Road Warriors (Hawk and Animal). Nikita Koloff served as the special guest referee. The leader of Varsity Club, Kevin Sullivan was Rotunda and Williams' manager but was sent to backstage by Koloff for misbehaviour. Rotunda got the early momentum by dropkicking Animal but Animal powerslammed him as Rotunda tried to perform a high-flying maneuver. Hawk and Williams were tagged in. Hawk dominated Williams by performing a powerslam and a fist drop. Williams rolled out to the ringside area but Hawk hit him with a diving clothesline off the apron. However, Williams avoided the match and Hawk's arm hit the ringpost. Williams began hurting Hawk's arm and then returned to the ring. Rotunda and Animal were tagged in. Williams illegally entered the ring to prevent Animal from winning. This caused Hawk to enter the ring. Rotunda was sent out to the floor as he missed a charge and Road Warriors performed an Doomsday Device, on Williams. Animal attempted to pin Williams but Varsity Club members Kevin Sullivan and Dan Spivey attacked Koloff, thus causing Rotunda and Williams to get disqualified. As a result, they retained the titles.

The ninth and final match of the show was a tag team match for the NWA United States Tag Team Championship. Eddie Gilbert and Rick Steiner defended the titles against Varsity Club members Kevin Sullivan and Dan Spivey. As the match started, Spivey attacked Steiner outside the floor and drove him into the ringpost, thus putting him out of action. This gave control of the match to Spivey and Sullivan, who double-teamed Gilbert throughout the match. Steiner recovered and climbed on the apron for a false tag. This caused a lot of confusion, which caused Steiner to deliver a Lariat, which he called Steiner-Line, to Sullivan, allowing Gilbert to pin Sullivan with a sunset flip to retain the titles.

== Aftermath ==
After winning the NWA World Heavyweight Championship from Ricky Steamboat at WrestleWar, Ric Flair became a fan favorite as he showed respect to Steamboat after the match. Flair began a rivalry with Terry Funk because Funk attacked Flair for turning down Funk's challenge for a title shot. This resulted in a severe potentially career-ending injury for Flair. On July 1 edition of World Championship Wrestling, Flair announced that he would not retire and agreed to defend the title against Funk at The Great American Bash. Flair defeated Funk to retain the title.

The controversy surrounding Varsity Club (Mike Rotunda and Steve Williams) during their NWA World Tag Team Championship defense against the Road Warriors at WrestleWar caused the title to be vacated. An 8–team tournament occurred to determine the new champions. The quarter–final round occurred on editions of World Championship Wrestling, the Fabulous Freebirds (Michael Hayes and Terry Gordy) defeating Road Warriors, the Samoan Swat Team defeating Ron Simmons and Ranger Ross, The Midnight Express (Bobby Eaton and Stan Lane) defeating Butch Reed and The Raider and the Dynamic Dudes defeating Rip Morgan and Jack Victory. On June 14 Clash of the Champions VII, the semi–final round took place, in which Fabulous Freebirds (Hayes and Jimmy Garvin with Gordy at ringside) defeated Dynamic Dudes and Midnight Express defeated Samoan Swat Team. In the final round, Fabulous Freebirds (same line-up as the semi-finals) defeated Midnight Express to win the titles. A rivalry was formed between Road Warriors and Samoan Swat Team during the tournament and Steve Williams left Varsity Club, resulting in a WarGames match pitting Steve Williams, Road Warriors and Midnight Express against Fabulous Freebirds (Michael Hayes, Jimmy Garvin and Terry Gordy) and Samaon Swat Team at The Great American Bash. Wiliams, Road Warriors and Midnight Express won.

After defeating Lex Luger for the NWA United States Heavyweight Championship at WrestleWar, Michael Hayes continued to feud with Luger over the title. Hayes held the title for only 15 days. Luger defeated Hayes for the title on May 22. On June 14 edition of Clash of the Champions VII, Ricky Steamboat defeated Terry Funk by disqualification when Funk attacked Steamboat with a microphone. After the match, Funk continued his assault on Steamboat until Luger made the save but then became a villain by attacking Steamboat himself for being jealous of not competing on Clash of the Champions and not receiving a NWA World Heavyweight Championship match. This resulted in a match between Luger and Steamboat for Luger's United States Championship at The Great American Bash. Luger defeated Steamboat by disqualification to retain his title after Steamboat attacked Luger with a steel chair.

This PPV marked the return of referee Nick Patrick to WCW. Patrick refereed for Georgia Championship Wrestling from 1980–85, then went to other territories as a wrestler and referee (and briefly helping his father in his wrestling promotion before returning to GCW's successor WCW in 1989, where he became senior referee after the retirement of Tommy Young later in 1989.

== Results ==
No.	Results	Stipulations	Times
1	The Great Muta (with Gary Hart) defeated Doug Gilbert (with Eddie Gilbert)	Singles match	03:03
2	Butch Reed defeated Ranger Ross	Singles match	06:59
3	Dick Murdoch defeated Bob Orton Jr. (with Gary Hart)	Bullrope match	04:54
4	Dynamic Dudes (Johnny Ace and Shane Douglas) defeated The Samoan SWAT Team (Fatu and Samu) (with Paul E. Dangerously)	Tag team match	11:02
5	Michael Hayes (with Hiro Matsuda) defeated Lex Luger (c)	Singles match for the NWA United States Heavyweight Championship	16:06
6	Sting (c) defeated The Iron Sheik (with Rip Morgan) by submission	Singles match for the NWA World Television Championship	02:12
7	Ric Flair defeated Ricky Steamboat (c)	Singles match for the NWA World Heavyweight Championship	31:37
8	The Road Warriors (Animal and Hawk) (with Paul Ellering) defeated The Varsity Club (Mike Rotunda and Steve Williams) (c) (with Kevin Sullivan) by disqualification	Tag team match for the NWA World Tag Team Championship with Nikita Koloff as special guest referee	06:06
9	Eddie Gilbert and Rick Steiner (c) (with Missy Hyatt) defeated The Varsity Club (Dan Spivey and Kevin Sullivan)	Tag team match for the NWA United States Tag Team Championship	06:41
(c) / – the champion(s) heading into the match
