= Nancy Benoit =

American professional wrestling valet and murder victim (1964–2007)

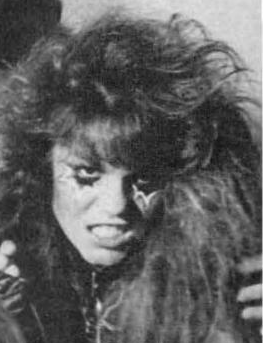
- Benoit (then known as Daus), c. 1984

Personal information
- Born: Nancy Elizabeth Toffoloni; May 17, 1964 Boston, Massachusetts, U.S.
- Died: June 22, 2007 (aged 43) Fayetteville, Georgia, U.S.
- Cause of death: Murder by strangulation
- Occupations: Professional wrestling manager; model
- Spouses: Jim Daus (m. 1982; div. 1985) Kevin Sullivan (m. 1985; div. 1997) Chris Benoit (m. 2000)
- Children: 1

Professional wrestling career
- Ring name(s): Devil Angel; Fallen Angel; Para; Robin Green; Woman
- Debut: June 30, 1984
- Retired: May 26, 1997

Nancy Elizabeth Benoit (formerly Daus, Sullivan, née Toffoloni; May 17, 1964 – June 22, 2007) was an American professional wrestling manager and model. She appeared in Florida Championship Wrestling, Extreme Championship Wrestling, and World Championship Wrestling where she was known under the ring name Woman.

In June 2007, Benoit and her son Daniel were murdered by her husband, WWE professional wrestler Chris Benoit, who then took his own life.

== Early life ==
After graduating from DeLand High School in Florida, Toffoloni got a job answering phones at State Farm Insurance. When George Napolitano needed a beautiful young girl for the cover of the June 1984 edition of the pro-wrestling magazine Wrestling All Stars, fellow photographer Bill Otten suggested the 20-year-old Nancy Toffoloni Daus for the role. Toffoloni, who had worked as a model, often sat alongside her then-husband Jim. She had also been selling programs at the Orlando shows and appeared as Apartment Wrestler "Para" in Stanley Weston's Sports Review Wrestling magazine. It was on this shoot where she met Kevin Sullivan, who eventually wanted her to be a part of his wrestling entourage. After months of convincing, she finally became an on-air valet, taking the ring name "Fallen Angel".

== Professional wrestling career ==
=== Early career (1984–1989) ===
As "Fallen Angel", Toffoloni made her in-ring debut on June 30, 1984, in Miami, Florida, for Championship Wrestling from Florida.

Toffoloni became a part of Kevin Sullivan's stable of kayfabe "Satanists", which also included wrestlers The Lock, Luna Vachon, The Purple Haze, and Sir Oliver Humperdink. Toffoloni and Kevin Sullivan traveled throughout the United States using the "Satanist" gimmick for promotions such as Angelo Savoldi's ICW and Southwest Championship Wrestling. The two married in 1985. On August 3, 1985, she wrestled Debbie Combs in Hawaii for NWA Polynesian Wrestling, in which she lost by disqualification.

=== World Championship Wrestling (1989–1990) ===
Sullivan debuted in World Championship Wrestling (WCW) in April 1990. Named "Robin Green", she was introduced as a "fan" of Rick Steiner named Robin Green, wearing a Steiner T-shirt and large glasses. She would sit in the audience and would interact with Steiner whenever he appeared, including giving him gifts. Steiner's brother Scott and their manager Missy Hyatt began to have suspicions after she suddenly changed to a new vampy look. At Clash of the Champions VIII in September 1989, Green tripped Scott in the ring, causing him and Rick to lose to champions The Fabulous Freebirds, it briefly caused dissension among the brothers. In the end, she turned on the Steiners, adopting the name Woman and vowed that the brothers would meet their "doom" at Halloween Havoc, but never made it clear who or what "Doom" was.

At Halloween Havoc in October 1989, Woman unveiled the Steiner Brothers' "Doom" – a couple of brawny, hard hitting masked wrestlers (Doom #1 and Doom #2). Doom defeated the Steiner Brothers. At Clash of the Champions IX in November 1989, Woman led Doom to victory over Eddie Gilbert and Tommy Rich; during the event, Nitron was introduced as Woman's new bodyguard. At Starrcade '89: Future Shock in December 1989, Woman accompanied Doom to ringside for their participation in the Iron Team round-robin tournament.

In early-1990, Woman left Doom to begin managing Ric Flair and the Four Horsemen. At WrestleWar '90: Wild Thing in February 1990, she accompanied Flair to ringside for his NWA World Heavyweight Championship title defense against Lex Luger. At Capital Combat in May 1990, she once again accompanied Flair to ringside for his steel cage match rematch against Luger; during the referee's pre-match check, he discovered that Woman had an illegal object hidden in her glove, which he confiscated prior to the match starting, ejecting her from the cage. Woman left WCW later that year.

=== Eastern Championship Wrestling / Extreme Championship Wrestling (1993–1996) ===
In late-1993, Nancy and Kevin Sullivan joined the Philadelphia-based promotion Eastern Championship Wrestling (ECW), where she reverted to the ring name "Woman". In December 1993, Sullivan and the Tazmaniac won the ECW Tag Team Championship. They held the championship until March 1994, when they were defeated by the Public Enemy.

After Sullivan left ECW in spring 1994, Woman began managing The Sandman. The Sandman's character was estranged from his wife and valet, Peaches, who had left him after he accidentally struck her during a match while temporarily blinded. Woman drove a wedge between The Sandman and Peaches, convincing him that Peaches was cheating on him with Tommy Cairo. In keeping with The Sandman's character, Woman would open his beers and light his cigarettes prior to matches. She began carrying a Singapore cane with which she would strike The Sandman's opponents. At When Worlds Collide on May 14, 1994, Woman and The Sandman lost to Cairo and Peaches in a Singapore Cane match, after which Peaches caned The Sandman in the groin until Woman threw salt in her eyes, enabling The Sandman to regroup and cane Cairo and Peaches.

In mid-1994, The Sandman began feuding with Tommy Dreamer after he kissed Woman. The feud culminated in an "I Quit" match on October 1, during which The Sandman was seemingly blinded when Dreamer pushed a lit cigarette into his eye and then caned him in the face. Following the match, Woman left The Sandman, calling him "useless". After Cairo mocked The Sandman, a guilt-stricken Dreamer challenged him to a match at November to Remember on November 5. At the same event, Peaches attempted to reconcile with The Sandman. Woman interrupted the reconciliation, caning Peaches and threatening The Sandman. After Dreamer came to the ring to stop Woman, The Sandman revealed that he was not in fact blinded and attacked Dreamer, with his estrangement from Woman a ploy to pit Dreamer and Cairo against one another.

In April 1995 at Three Way Dance, Woman again left The Sandman, aligning herself with Shane Douglas. At Hostile City Showdown on April 15, she helped The Sandman defeat Douglas for his second ECW World Heavyweight Championship by striking him in the knee with a Singapore cane, revealing the turn to have been another ruse. Following The Sandman's victory, Woman began carrying the ECW World Heavyweight Championship to ringside. Throughout mid-1995, she helped The Sandman defend his championship in a series of matches with Cactus Jack. In September, she began also managing The Sandman's ally, ECW World Television Champion 2 Cold Scorpio. In late 1995, The Sandman began feuding with Mikey Whipwreck, during which a controversial storyline began in which Woman became visibly aroused while watching The Sandman cane Whipwreck. The Sandman's reign lasted until October 28, when he lost to Whipwreck in a ladder match after Stunning Steve Austin prevented Woman from interfering.

On October 28, 1995, 2 Cold Scorpio defeated Rocco Rock to win the ECW World Tag Team Championship, then selected The Sandman as his partner. The Sandman regained the ECW World Heavyweight Championship in a three-way dance with Whipwreck and Austin at December to Dismember on December 9, giving Woman control of all three championships. On December 29 at Holiday Hell, Whipwreck defeated 2 Cold Scorpio in a singles match with the World Tag Team Championship on the line. The Sandman's third reign as World Heavyweight Champion lasted until January 27, 1996, when he lost to Raven.

In February 1996 at Big Apple Blizzard Blast, Woman, who had signed a contract to return to WCW and had already appeared on WCW Monday Nitro, acknowledged that she was joining WCW and tried to convince announcer Joey Styles and the Sandman to come to WCW with her. After both men declined, Woman refused to leave the building. 2 Cold Scorpio then came to the ring and carried Woman out of the building, depositing her in a limousine and instructing the chauffeur to "take that bitch to Atlanta!" (the location of the headquarters of WCW). This marked her final appearance in ECW.

=== World Championship Wrestling (1996–1997) ===
Sullivan (as "Woman") made her return to WCW on the January 22, 1996 episode of WCW Monday Nitro as one of many women who stood in the aisle and waved as Hulk Hogan and Randy Savage came to the ring. On the February 5 episode of Nitro she turned on Savage during his match with Chris Benoit and rejoined Flair, Arn Anderson, Brian Pillman, and Benoit in the then-current incarnation of the Four Horsemen. Miss Elizabeth also managed the stable.

In 1996, Pillman had left the Horsemen, but they added Steve McMichael and his wife Debra in June, which didn't sit well with Woman. In her next angle, the two bickered, not getting along in general. The Four Horsemen were often given interview time on Nitro and when it came time for Debra to speak on the mic, she'd often go into a soliloquy regarding Woman's looks and fashion sense – usually when the two weren't within the vicinity of each other. Despite the heavy tension, the two managers never had a physical altercation.

Concurrently, she started an on-screen relationship with Benoit, who at the time was involved in a feud with her real-life husband, Kevin Sullivan. On December 7, on WCW Saturday Night, during a post-match interview with Sullivan, a home movie of the couple canoodling in a kitchen was played in front of him. Woman taunted Sullivan by saying, "You can't find me" and "I'm my own woman," while Benoit added: "You consider yourself the master of human chess. Well, my bishop just took your queen". After the video, Sullivan appeared speechless, and his manager Jimmy Hart led him off stage. The feud between Benoit and Sullivan saw Woman clashing with Sullivan's then-valet, Jacquelyn, at ringside. In one match, the two ladies were strapped together, took shots at each other, and used the strap connecting them as a weapon against the men.

Eventually, the on-screen relationship between Benoit and Woman developed into a real-life affair off-screen. Because of this, it is often joked that Kevin Sullivan "booked his own divorce". The two divorced in 1997. Sullivan lost a retirement match to Benoit; his intent had been to retire from in-ring action and focus on booking. Woman's final WCW appearance (and professional wrestling appearance as Woman) took place on May 26, 1997, on Monday Nitro as she accompanied Benoit to the ring for a confrontation with Jimmy Hart regarding the whereabouts of Sullivan, who wasn't in the arena. On the following week's show, Benoit came alone to ringside without her by his side. After managing him for a little over half a year, no reason was given for Woman's sudden disappearance, and she was never mentioned on WCW programming again.

== Personal life ==
Before her marriage to Kevin Sullivan in 1985, Benoit had been married to and divorced from Jim Daus.

In early 1997, while married to Kevin Sullivan, she was having an extramarital affair with Chris Benoit. She and Benoit became engaged later in 1997 after her divorce from Sullivan, although Benoit referred to her as only his fiancée even after they were married. She managed her husband's career from their home in Atlanta.

She gave birth to their son Daniel Christopher Benoit on February 25, 2000. She married Chris on November 23, 2000. In May 2003, she filed for divorce, citing the marriage as "irrevocably broken" and alleging "cruel treatment." She dropped the suit in August 2003, as well as a restraining order filed on her husband.

In December 2006, Nancy Benoit had back and neck fusion surgery with Lloyd Youngblood, the same surgeon who had done a 3–hour neck operation on Nancy's husband Chris on June 28, 2001.

After Nancy Benoit's death in 2007, Hustler published nude photographs of her from a shoot taken when she was 20 years old. The length of time between the events caused controversy, causing critics to claim that Hustler owner Larry Flynt was attempting to capitalize on the event. The family of Nancy Benoit took legal action against Hustler. The appellate court ruled that, "The photographs published by [Flynt] neither relate to the incident of public concern conceptually [the murders] nor correspond with the time period during which Benoit was rendered, against her will, the subject of public scrutiny".

== Death ==
On June 25, 2007, Nancy, her husband Chris, and their seven-year-old son Daniel were found dead in their home in suburban Atlanta at around 2:30 p.m. It first was reported by the WWE Mobile Alerts service and posted to their official website soon after.

Lieutenant Tommy Pope of the Fayette County Sheriff's Department told ABC News it was being investigated as a double murder-suicide, and the police were not searching for any suspects outside of the house, as the instruments of death were located at the scene of the crime.

During a press conference on June 26, Fayette County District Attorney Scott Ballard reported that Chris Benoit had killed his wife and son and committed suicide. A Bible was left by Nancy's body, and she died of asphyxiation. She had bruises on her back and stomach consistent with an attacker pressing a knee into her back while pulling on a cord around her neck. Daniel also died of asphyxiation, without signs of restraint. He had internal injuries to the throat area, but no bruises, indicating he may have been killed by a choke. Benoit killed Nancy on Friday, Daniel on Saturday, then asphyxiated himself with the cord of a weight machine in his basement on Sunday.

A memorial for Nancy and Daniel took place in Daytona Beach, Florida, on July 14, 2007. Both were cremated and their ashes placed in starfish-shape urns for Nancy's family. Chris was also cremated after a private service near his hometown of Edmonton, but the fate of his ashes has not been publicly revealed.

In January 2024, she was posthumously awarded Pro Wrestling Illustrated's (PWI) Stanley Weston Award (Lifetime Achievement) for 2023.

== Accomplishments ==
- Pro Wrestling Illustrated
  - Stanley Weston Award for Lifetime Achievement (2023)

== See also ==
- List of premature professional wrestling deaths
