= WrestleWar '90: Wild Thing =

1990 World Championship Wrestling pay-per-view event

- VHS cover featuring Ric Flair and Lex Luger
- Promotion(s): National Wrestling Alliance; World Championship Wrestling
- Date: February 25, 1990
- City: Greensboro, North Carolina
- Venue: Greensboro Coliseum
- Attendance: 7,894
- Buy rate: 175,000

Pay-per-view chronology
← Previous; Starrcade	Next → Capital Combat

WrestleWar chronology
← Previous; 1989	Next → 1991

WrestleWar '90: Wild Thing was a professional wrestling pay-per-view (PPV) event, produced by World Championship Wrestling (WCW) under the National Wrestling Alliance (NWA) banner. It took place on February 25, 1990, from the Greensboro Coliseum in Greensboro, North Carolina. This would be the second year in a row WCW promoted a PPV under the name "WrestleWar", a series that would include four shows in total.

Seven matches were contested at the event. In the main event, Ric Flair defeated Lex Luger by countout to retain the NWA World Heavyweight Championship.

== Storylines ==
Other on-screen personnel
Role:	Name:
Commentators	Jim Ross
Commentators	Terry Funk
Ring announcer	Gary Michael Cappetta
Interviewers	Gordon Solie
Interviewers	Missy Hyatt
Referees	Mike Atkins
Referees	Nick Patrick

The WrestleWar show featured a number of professional wrestling matches with different wrestlers involved in pre-existing, scripted feuds, plots, and storylines. Wrestlers were portrayed as either heels (those that portray the "bad guys") or faces (the "good guy" characters) as they followed a series of tension-building events, which culminated in a wrestling match or series of matches.

The main event of the show was originally supposed to see Ric Flair defend the NWA World Heavyweight Championship against Sting but Sting was injured a few weeks prior during the main event of Clash of the Champions X: Texas Shootout. Sting was replaced by his longtime friend Lex Luger in the match. Luger was originally slated to defend the NWA United States Heavyweight Championship against Dr. Death Steve Williams, a match that was dropped. The opening match loss by the Dynamic Dudes (Shane Douglas and Johnny Ace) to Kevin Sullivan and Buzz Sawyer was the last time the team worked together ever again. The Chicago Street Fight between The Road Warriors (Hawk and Animal) and The Skyscrapers saw "The Masked Skyscraper" replace Dan Spivey as Mark Callous' partner, citing an injury to Dan Spivey. The Masked Skyscraper was Mike Enos under a mask, at the time of the show Enos held the AWA World Tag Team Championship in the rival American Wrestling Association (AWA) with Wayne Bloom.

== Home media and streaming ==
The event was released on home video in the United States and the United Kingdom by Turner Home Entertainment. In the UK, it was released in 1992. The event was edited down to two hours and the first two matches were not included.

In 2014, the event was included on the WWE's streaming platform the WWE Network as part of its launch and remained on the service until the platform closed in 2026. In June 2025, WWE uploaded the event to stream freely on their WCW YouTube channel.

== Results ==
No.	Results	Stipulations	Times
1	Kevin Sullivan and Buzz Sawyer defeated The Dynamic Dudes (Shane Douglas and Johnny Ace)	Tag team match	10:15
2	Norman the Lunatic defeated Cactus Jack Manson (with Kevin Sullivan)	Singles match	09:33
3	The Rock 'n' Roll Express (Ricky Morton and Robert Gibson) defeated The Midnight Express (Bobby Eaton and Stan Lane) (with Jim Cornette)	Tag team match	19:31
4	The Road Warriors (Hawk and Animal) (with Paul Ellering) defeated The Skyscrapers (Mark Callous and The Masked Skyscraper) (with Teddy Long)	Chicago Street Fight	04:59
5	Brian Pillman and Tom Zenk (c) defeated The Fabulous Freebirds (Michael Hayes and Jimmy Garvin)	Tag team match for the NWA United States Tag Team Championship	24:32
6	The Steiner Brothers (Rick Steiner and Scott Steiner) (c) defeated Ole Anderson and Arn Anderson	Tag team match for the NWA World Tag Team Championship	16:05
7	Ric Flair (c) (with Woman) defeated Lex Luger (with Sting) by countout	Singles match for the NWA World Heavyweight Championship	38:08
(c) / – the champion(s) heading into the match

== See also ==
- 1990 in professional wrestling
