= Butch Reed =

American professional wrestler (1954–2021)

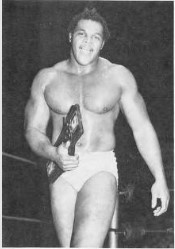
- Reed, c. 1983

Personal information
- Born: Bruce Franklin Reed; July 11, 1954 Kansas City, Missouri, U.S.
- Died: February 5, 2021 (aged 66) Warrensburg, Missouri, U.S.
- Education: University of Central Missouri

Professional wrestling career
- Ring name(s): Bruce Reed; Butch Reed; Doom #2
- Billed height: 6 ft 2 in (188 cm)
- Billed weight: 262 lb (119 kg)
- Billed from: Kansas City, Missouri
- Trained by: Ronnie Etchison
- Debut: 1978
- Retired: 2013

Bruce Franklin Reed (July 11, 1954 – February 5, 2021) was an American professional wrestler and football player, better known by the ring name Butch Reed. He played college football at the University of Central Missouri, was a star in Mid-South Wrestling and had high-profile tag team matches in the World Wrestling Federation (such as the first Survivor Series main event) and World Championship Wrestling (where he held the championship with Ron Simmons, as Doom).

== Early life ==
Reed attended the University of Central Missouri, where he played college football. In 1976, he signed as a rookie free agent with the Kansas City Chiefs of the National Football League, but the linebacker was cut before the season.

== Professional wrestling career ==
=== Early career (1978–1983) ===
Butch Reed was trained to wrestle by Ronnie Etchison debuting in 1978. Early on he wrestled as Bruce Reed adopting the "Hacksaw" nickname over time. Reed and Jerry Roberts beat Mike George and Bob Sweetan for the NWA Central States Tag Team Championship in 1980 and lost it to The Kelly Twins in January 1981. His next title also came as one half of a tag team when he and Sweet Brown Sugar won the Florida version of the NWA North American Tag Team Championship when they beat Dory Funk, Jr. and David Von Erich in 1982. Reed wrestled mainly for the NWA in the early 1980s and made a name for himself in their St. Louis, Florida Championship Wrestling and Georgia Championship Wrestling territories. On April 7, 1982, Reed had what is now recognized as the first 5-star rated match by Dave Meltzer in which he challenged Ric Flair for the NWA title in Miami, Florida.

=== Mid-South Wrestling (1983–1986) ===
Reed established himself as a force to be reckoned with while competing in Bill Watts' Mid-South Wrestling from 1983 through early 1986. In Mid-South, he was known as "Hacksaw" Butch Reed and came into the territory as a tag team partner for the main face in the territory the Junkyard Dog. Reed immediately came face to face with "Hacksaw" Jim Duggan over the "Hacksaw" nickname. Back in 1983, Duggan was part of the heel group, The Rat Pack, along with Ted DiBiase and Matt Borne and used every dirty move he could think of to beat Reed. He and Duggan feuded over the "Hacksaw" name until Duggan turned face. This resulted in Reed's heel turn when Duggan was picked to be the Junkyard Dog's tag team partner over Reed.

Reed appeared on TV stating that "Butch Reed is going to start looking out for Butch Reed", which prompted the Junkyard Dog (JYD) to join him in the ring. After arguing back and forth, Reed attacked JYD and was soon joined in the attack by DiBiase. On July 16, 1983, Reed won the Mid-South North American Heavyweight Championship and turned back JYD's challenges in subsequent months. In October 1983, Reed's arrogance made him agree to let the Mid-South fans pick a challenger for the North American title; he let them pick from the JYD, "Hacksaw" Jim Duggan, newcomer Krusher Khruschev, and Magnum T. A. The fans picked JYD but Reed dismissed the choice; he also said Duggan and Khruschev did not deserve a shot and instead gave the title shot to T.A., who won the title, then lost it twelve days later to Nikolai Volkoff.

On the same night that Reed lost the North American title, he and partner Jim Neidhart beat Magnum T. A. and "Hacksaw" Jim Duggan to win the Mid-South Tag Team Championship. After a few weeks, the North American title was returned to Reed, claiming that the title match with T.A. was not legal since the fans chose JYD. Reed's run as a double champion did not last long as JYD got his title shot with Dusty Rhodes as the special guest referee. After losing the North American title, Reed and Neidhart focused on the tag team titles and defended them against all comers. When Magnum and Mr. Wrestling II challenged for the titles, they felt that the challengers had to put up something of their own: Mr. Wrestling II's mask. Mr. Wrestling did not unmask that night as they took the gold from Reed and Neidhart in a Steel cage match on Christmas of 1983. Neidhart and Reed started to blame each other and had a short, brutal feud.

The Neidhart feud was soon replaced with one with Terry Taylor who came out to save Neidhart from being beaten down with a football helmet after a match. The Reed/Taylor feud raged all through the spring of 1984 and was instrumental in establishing Terry Taylor as a star in Mid-South. The feud soon expanded to include "Nature Boy" Buddy Landel as Reed's tag team partner and saw Reed attack Taylor with a "Coalminer's Glove" on several occasions. After fighting with Terry Taylor for months on end, Reed's attention turned from Taylor back to his old enemy the Junkyard Dog. During a match, Reed and Landel attacked JYD as he performed under a mask as "Stagger Lee" and painted him yellow. The war between the two brought in Sonny King and later Ernie Ladd to team with Junkyard Dog. After the tag matches, came brutal singles matches such as Dog Collar Matches.

Just as the feud was about to reach its heated highlight, the Junkyard Dog left Mid-South and signed with the World Wrestling Federation without informing booker Bill Watts of his decision. This meant that the federation was without their biggest face and the shows had to be hastily rebooked. Watts brought in "Master G" (journeyman wrestler George Wells) to take JYD's place but the feud between Reed and "Master G" never took off forcing Watts to rethink his options. When "General" Skandor Akbar entered the Mid-South and started to build a stable of heels, he presented Buddy Landel with a golden Rolex watch with the understanding that it wasn't actually for Landel but for someone else Akbar was trying to recruit. When Landel tried to give the watch to Reed, he became incensed, in the storyline, stomped on the watch, and started to brawl with his former partner. Akbar and his cronies came to ringside, which prompted Reed to rant on them getting the crowd behind him as he told them he didn't need back-up. When "Hacksaw" Jim Duggan came to his rescue from a 3 on 1 attack, Reed's face status was cemented. The two Hacksaws feuded with Akbar's army of Landel, DiBiase, Steve Williams, and Hercules. The two Hacksaws were successful at first, until Reed came up against Kamala. He proved to be too much for Reed, beating him all over the Mid-South territory before Reed quietly left.

Reed went to the American Wrestling Association for a short stint as Jimmy Garvin's bodyguard, then returned to Mid-South in the middle of 1985. In October, he beat Dick Murdoch for the North American title. Around this time, he had a famous one-hour time-limit draw with NWA Champion "Nature Boy" Ric Flair and feuded with Dick Slater when Slater helped Ric Flair keep the world title. In January 1986, Slater won the North American title from Butch Reed through underhanded means.

=== NWA Central States (1979-1985, 1986) ===
Reed would make occasional appearances from 1979 to 1985 for Central States.

After leaving Mid-South Wrestling once more in 1985, Reed returned to Kansas City in 1986 and the NWA Central States territory run by Bob Geigel. Here he initially teamed with Rufus R. Jones . He later turned on Jones and joined the group of manager Slick in 1986. After a brief feud with Jones, Reed feuded with Bruiser Brody. That summer, he lost a Loser Leaves Town match to Brody and left the territory along with Slick.

=== World Wrestling Federation (1986–1988) ===
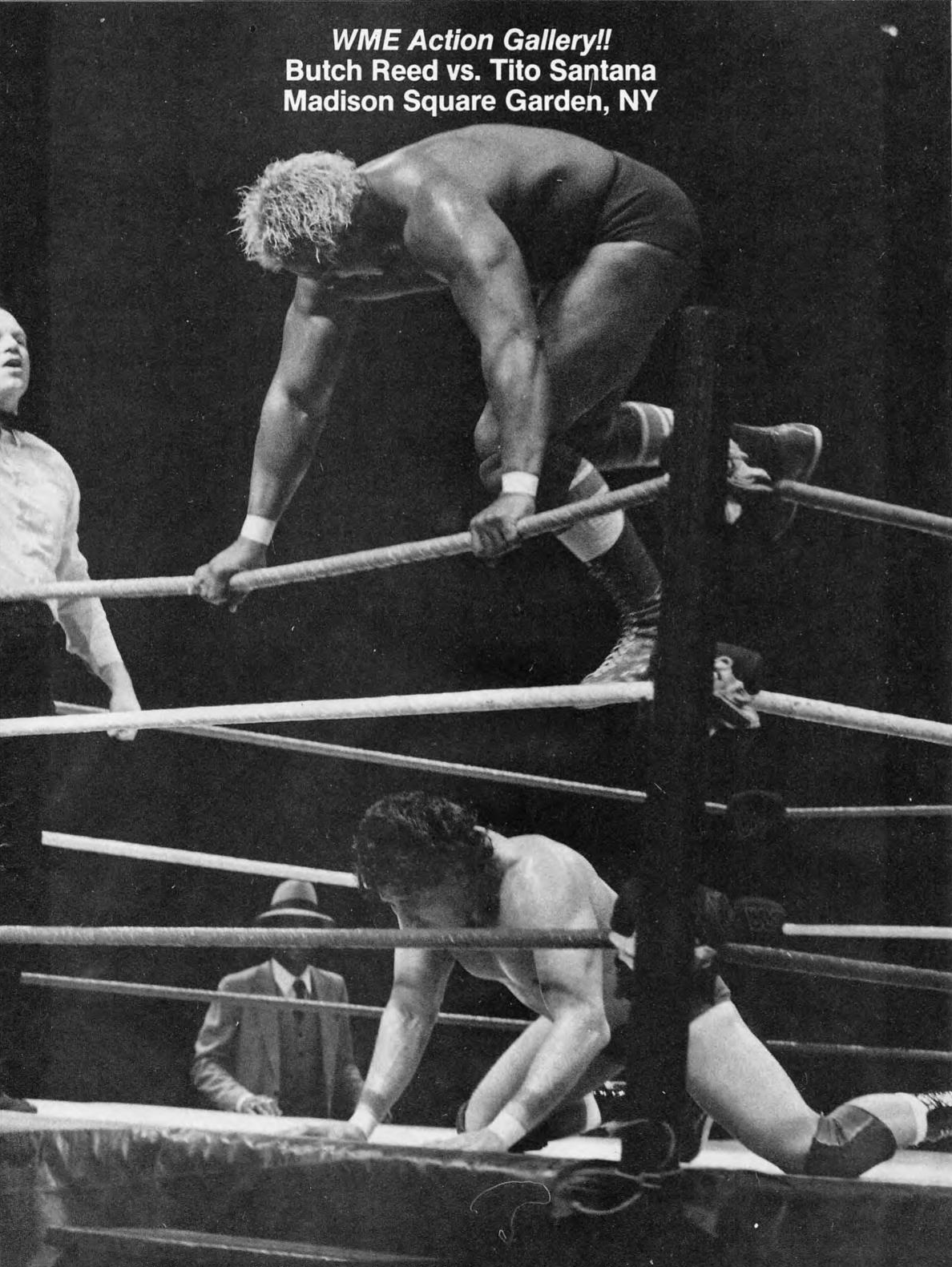
Reed (top) dropping on Tito Santana (bottom), circa 1987

Reed and Slick signed with the WWF and were brought in as a package. Reed dyed his hair blond and became "The Natural" Butch Reed, an updated version of Sweet Daddy Siki. He feuded initially with Tito Santana, a target of Slick's verbal jabs, and made his pay-per-view debut at WrestleMania III, where he defeated Koko B. Ware.

In the weeks after WrestleMania, Reed targeted new Intercontinental champion Ricky Steamboat and faced him at house shows and on an episode of Wrestling Challenge. Reed was a no show in Buffalo, NY where Steamboat lost the belt to Honky Tonk Man.

In the fall, the WWF was heavily hyping a feud between Reed and Superstar Billy Graham, a former WWF champion who was staging a comeback after hip-replacement surgery. Graham's condition was such that he could no longer handle the physical demands of being a wrestler, so Reed and Slick's newest acquisition, the One Man Gang, "injured" Graham in a sneak attack that was used to explain his permanent retirement. Graham began managing the man who came to his aid, Don Muraco, with Muraco immediately entering into a rivalry with Reed. The enemies were on opposing teams in the main event of the first Survivor Series (Muraco took Graham's place on Hulk Hogan's team); Reed (a member of André the Giant's team), was the first elimination of the match, by Hogan.

Reed competed in (and was the first wrestler eliminated from) the first Royal Rumble match in January 1988. Two months later, he was eliminated in the first round of the WrestleMania IV championship tournament by eventual winner Randy Savage. Reed dominated most of the match against Savage, but spent too much time mouthing off to Savage's manager (and real-life wife) Miss Elizabeth while climbing to the top turnbuckle. Savage caught Reed, threw him off for a slam and immediately hit his diving elbow drop off the top turnbuckle for the win. This first round loss at WrestleMania IV was Reed's final match for the WWF.

On September 9, 2007, Reed made a cameo appearance backstage at the September 14 edition of WWE SmackDown!, during a segment involving his former manager and SmackDown! General manager Theodore Long.

=== Jim Crockett Promotions / NWA World Championship Wrestling (1989–1992) ===
Shortly after WrestleMania IV, Reed and the WWF parted ways, Reed's manager Slick stayed with the WWF while Reed struck out on his own once more. Butch Reed resurfaced in the NWA's Jim Crockett Promotions as "Hacksaw" Butch Reed. He more or less immediately resumed his Mid-South feud with The Junkyard Dog. He was briefly managed by J. J. Dillon before his contract was "sold" to Hiro Matsuda's "Yamasaki Corporation". Reed did not see much success in the early parts of his run with JCP; his biggest match was a loss to Sting at the Chi-Town Rumble on February 20, 1989. During the summer of 1989, he floundered in the mid-card as Jim Crockett Promotions grew to become a national wrestling organization.

The Steiner Brothers were involved in an angle with Woman who promised "Doom" for the two brothers but never specified exactly what this meant. She unveiled her promise at Halloween Havoc 1989, a couple of brawny, hard hitting masked African-Americans. It was obvious to most wrestling fans that Ron Simmons and Butch Reed were under the masks — they had both been on WCW television shortly before Doom debuted, and they were the only two African-American wrestlers in the company with the same massive physical appearance — but the announcers were made to keep up the storyline (although Jim Ross accidentally exposed Reed's identity on commentary during Starrcade 89: Future Shock). Doom won their debut match against the Steiners when one of the members of Doom pinned Rick Steiner after a headbutt with an illegal object in his mask. Doom followed up on this success by defeating Eddie Gilbert and Tommy Rich at Clash of the Champions IX, looking very strong in the process.

Doom's next PPV outing did not come with the same success. Along with the Steiner Brothers, the Road Warriors, and the Samoan Swat Team they were entered in a one night, tag team round robin tournament. They did not score a single point, ending dead last in the tournament. Doom's misfortune continued as Woman soon dropped the team and left the federation. Then on February 6, 1990, at Clash of the Champions X, Doom were defeated by the Steiner Brothers and as a result of the stipulation were forced to unmask.

Doom beat the Steiner Brothers at Capital Combat; at that point in time, the Steiners didn't lose very often. Doom won the tag team titles and quickly set about defending them against the former champions the Steiners as well the rest of WCW's very talented tag team division. In the fall of 1990, Doom soon feuded with The Four Horsemen (becoming tweeners in the process) and defended against them in two inconclusive tag team title matches at Halloween Havoc 1990 and Starrcade 1990. At Clash of the Champions XIV, Doom lost a non-title match to Sting and Lex Luger in a match that foreshadowed the trouble that lay ahead.

On February 24, 1991, at WCW's WrestleWar PPV, Doom took on former tag team champions The Fabulous Freebirds and lost due to miscommunication between Reed and Simmons. After the Freebirds left the ring, Reed turned on Simmons and beat him up; this completed Simmons' turn to face and ended the team of Doom forever. Teddy Long sided with Butch Reed (who reverted back to full heel) as the former Doom partners engaged in a short but intense feud. The feud culminated at SuperBrawl I where Ron Simmons pinned Butch Reed in a Steel cage match (referred to as a "Thunder-Doom" cage match). After the PPV, Reed left the company for a short while only to return in 1992 siding with The Barbarian and Cactus Jack. Reed and the Barbarian teamed up to defeat Dustin Rhodes and Barry Windham at Clash of the Champions XX Reed also issued a challenge toformer partner Simmons, by then WCW World Champion and faced him in tag team matches, but left WCW for good shortly afterwards after being fired for no-showing a TV taping in Macon, Georgia, on September 15.

=== Late career (1992–2002, 2005–2013) ===
After leaving WCW, Reed went to the United States Wrestling Association where he resumed feuding with Junkyard Dog. Reed beat him for the USWA Unified World Heavyweight Championship on October 12, 1992. He held the title for a week before he lost it to Todd Champion. He left the promotion before 1992 ended.

Reed next appeared for a notable promotion in 1994, the Global Wrestling Federation in its last days. He became the penultimate GWF North American champion on June 4, 1994, when he beat Rod Price for the held-up title. It had been held up the previous day after a match he had with Price got out of hand and ended inconclusively. He held it for almost a month before losing it to "Gentleman" Chris Adams, who was the last GWF North American champion.

Reed continued to work on the independent scene on a part-time basis so that he could participate in the rodeo circuit in Kansas City. In 2000, he started working for Harley Race's WLW promotion. He beat Luminous Warrior for the WLW Heavyweight Title on March 31, 2001 and held the title until Dennis McHawes beat him for it on January 25, 2002. After losing the title, he retired from wrestling.

After being retired for three years, Reed returned in 2005, appearing several times for Mid States Wrestling and eventually defeating Heavyweight Champion "Mr. Saturday Night" Michael Barry on November 11, 2005, for the Mid States Wrestling Heavyweight title. He also participated in the "Legends of Wrestling" tour in 2006. On August 18, 2007, he lost to Steve Williams at NWA Legends Fanfest.

Reed's last match was on May 18, 2013, teaming with Bob Orton Jr. and losing to Flash Flanagan and Ron Powers at SICW in East Carondelet, Illinois.

== Personal life and death ==
In July 2016, Reed was named part of a class action lawsuit filed against WWE which alleged that wrestlers incurred traumatic brain injuries during their tenure and that the company concealed the risks of injury. The suit was litigated by attorney Konstantine Kyros, who has been involved in a number of other lawsuits against WWE. In September 2018, the lawsuit was dismissed by US District Judge Vanessa Lynne Bryant.

On February 5, 2021, an Instagram post from Reed's official account announced his death from complications of two heart attacks that occurred in January. His relatives attributed his death to COVID-19, and said he tested positive around January 12. He was 66 years old.

== Championships and accomplishments ==
- Central States Wrestling
  - NWA Central States Tag Team Championship (1 time) – with Jerry Roberts
- Championship Wrestling from Florida
  - NWA International Heavyweight Championship (1 time) (reign not recognized in Japan)
  - NWA North American Tag Team Championship (Florida version) (1 time) – with Sweet Brown Sugar
- Georgia Championship Wrestling
  - Omni Thanksgiving Tag Team Tournament (1983) – with Pez Whatley
- Global Wrestling Federation
  - GWF North American Heavyweight Championship (1 time)
- Insane Championship Wrestling
  - MWCW Heavyweight Championship (1 time)
- Mid-South Wrestling
  - Mid-South North American Heavyweight Championship (3 times)
  - Mid-South Tag Team Championship (1 time) – with Jim Neidhart
  - Mid-South Television Championship (1 time)
- Mid-States Wrestling
  - MSW Heavyweight Championship (1 time)
- Missouri Wrestling Federation / Midwest Wrestling Federation
  - MWF Heavyweight Championship (1 time)
- Pro Wrestling Illustrated
  - Ranked #174 of the 500 best singles wrestlers during the PWI Years in 2003.
  - Ranked #91 of the 100 best tag teams during the PWI Years with Ron Simmons in 2003.
- St. Louis Wrestling Hall of Fame
  - Class of 2025
- United States Wrestling Association
  - USWA Unified World Heavyweight Championship (1 time)
- World Championship Wrestling
  - WCW World Tag Team Championship (1 time) – with Ron Simmons
- World League Wrestling
  - WLW Heavyweight Championship (1 time)
- Wrestling Observer Newsletter
  - Strongest Wrestler (1984)
  - Most Unimproved (1987)
