= The Four Horsemen (professional wrestling) =

Professional wrestling stable

- Logo of the Four Horsemen

Stable
- Name(s): The Four Horsemen; The Horsemen; Yamazaki Corporation; The Three Horsemen
- Leader: Ric Flair
- Members: Arn Anderson; Ole Anderson; Tully Blanchard
- Debut: 1985
- Years active: 1985–1989; 1989–1991; 1993; 1995–1997; 1998–1999; 2022

The Four Horsemen is an American professional wrestling stable that originally consisted of Ric Flair, Arn Anderson, Ole Anderson, and Tully Blanchard.

The stable originated in Jim Crockett Promotions as part of Mid Atlantic Championship Wrestling and later World Championship Wrestling for much of the 1980s and 1990s. Flair and Arn Anderson were members of each incarnation of the group until Anderson's retirement after a neck injury. As of 2022, Arn Anderson has the ownership of the stable's trademark and other intellectual properties. The Horsemen incarnation consisting of Ric Flair, Tully Blanchard, Arn Anderson, and Barry Windham is widely considered to be one of the greatest factions in professional wrestling history.

== History ==
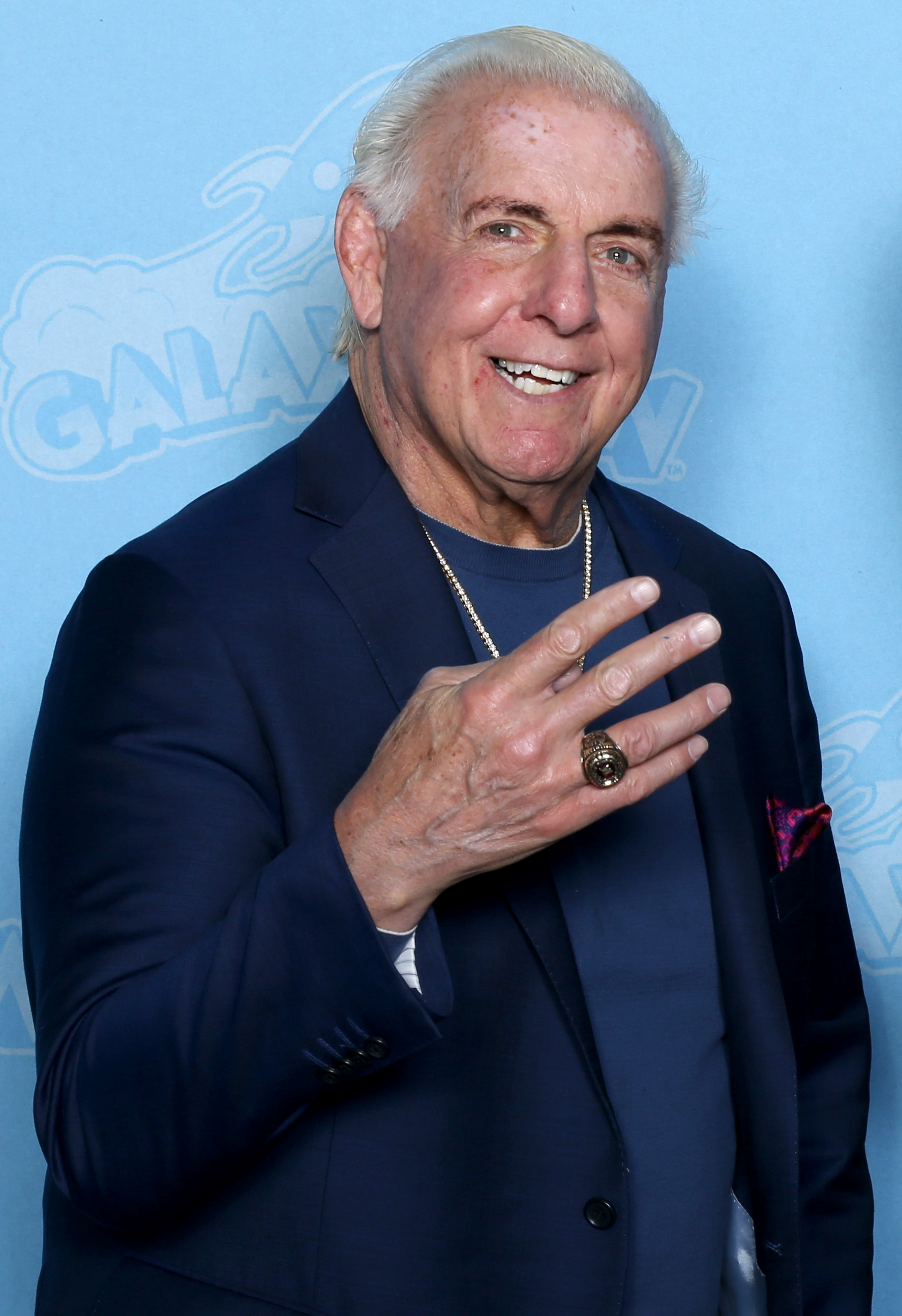
Ric Flair, throwing up the Horsemen's signature hand gesture, in November 2019

Ric Flair was introduced to the storylines in Mid-Atlantic Championship Wrestling in the 1970s as a cousin of the Minnesota Wrecking Crew (Gene Anderson and Ole Anderson). After leaving the Crew he took on Blackjack Mulligan and Greg Valentine as his partners to feud with them. By 1981, when he became NWA World Heavyweight Champion, he and the Crew had reconciled, having their blessing to team with them as well as with Mulligan and Valentine to feud with top NWA man Harley Race and his Mid-Atlantic hitmen, Bob Orton Jr. and Dick Slater. When Mulligan retired and Valentine jumped to the World Wrestling Federation (WWF), Flair started looking for a new entourage.

=== Original Four Horsemen (1985–1987) ===
"Not since the Four Horsemen of the Apocalypse have so few wreaked so much havoc on so many." - Arn Anderson, 1985

The Four Horsemen formed in 1985 with Ric Flair, Ole and Arn Anderson (the latter brought in from Continental Championship Wrestling), and Tully Blanchard from Southwest Championship Wrestling, with J. J. Dillon as their manager (Dillon was originally serving as manager of Blanchard). They feuded with Dusty Rhodes (breaking his ankle and hand), Magnum T. A., Barry Windham, The Rock 'n' Roll Express (breaking Ricky Morton's nose), Nikita Koloff (injuring his neck), and The Road Warriors. Animal, Hawk, Ronnie Garvin and many others fought Ric Flair for the NWA World Heavyweight Title during that time period. They usually had most of the titles in the NWA, and they often bragged about their success (in the ring and with women) in their interviews.

The Four Horsemen moniker was not planned from the start. The origin of the stable dates to a Jim Crockett Promotions taping which was held in The Omni in Atlanta, Georgia in September 1985. During the event, Ric Flair turned on Dusty Rhodes after Rhodes saved him from a beatdown at the hands of the Koloffs and Krusher Kruschev, with Ole and Arn Anderson then entering the ring and assisting Flair in breaking Dusty Rhodes' ankle and putting him out of action. As Rhodes was attempting to surrender his NWA Television Title, which was vacated on October 19, 1985, Arn, who desired the title, would recruit Tully Blanchard, with the two then kicking Dusty's crutches away, with Arn then stealing the title. It has been alleged that due to time constraints at a television taping, production threw together an impromptu tag team interview of Flair, The Andersons, Tully Blanchard and his manager JJ. Dillon. In his autobiography To Be The Man, Flair claimed that it was during this interview that Arn commented: "The only time this much havoc had been wreaked by this few a number of people, you need to go all the way back to the Four Horsemen of the Apocalypse!" Alternatively, Dillon and Blanchard stated during a Four Horsemen discussion panel, which took place at the George Tragos/Lou Thesz Professional Wrestling Hall of Fame on July 24, 2016, that the interview where Arn had actually said the phrase, and also debuted the group's trademark four finger pose, was after the original four members wrestled in an eight tag team match and that the group's formation was centered around the original four members holding championships at the time. The comparison and the name stuck. However, during a pair of television interviews before Starrcade 1985, Arn Anderson referred to them as "The Four Horses". Video footage from the October 26, 1985 episode of NWA Worldwide showed Arn, who had possession of the stolen NWA Television Championship, calling himself, Ole, Tully and Flair "The four horses, the four people that make things happen." Immediately after Arn departed, Tully came out with Baby Doll and called the group the Four Horsemen, crediting Anderson for the name, though it was not the same one. Arn Anderson has said in an RF Video shoot interview that he, Flair and Blanchard were as close as anybody could be away from the ring while they were together. They lived the gimmick outside of the arena, as they took limos and jets to the cities in which they wrestled. Baby Doll was Flair's valet for a couple of months in 1986, after previously managing Tully Blanchard during 1985.

=== Lex Luger and Barry Windham (1987–1989) ===
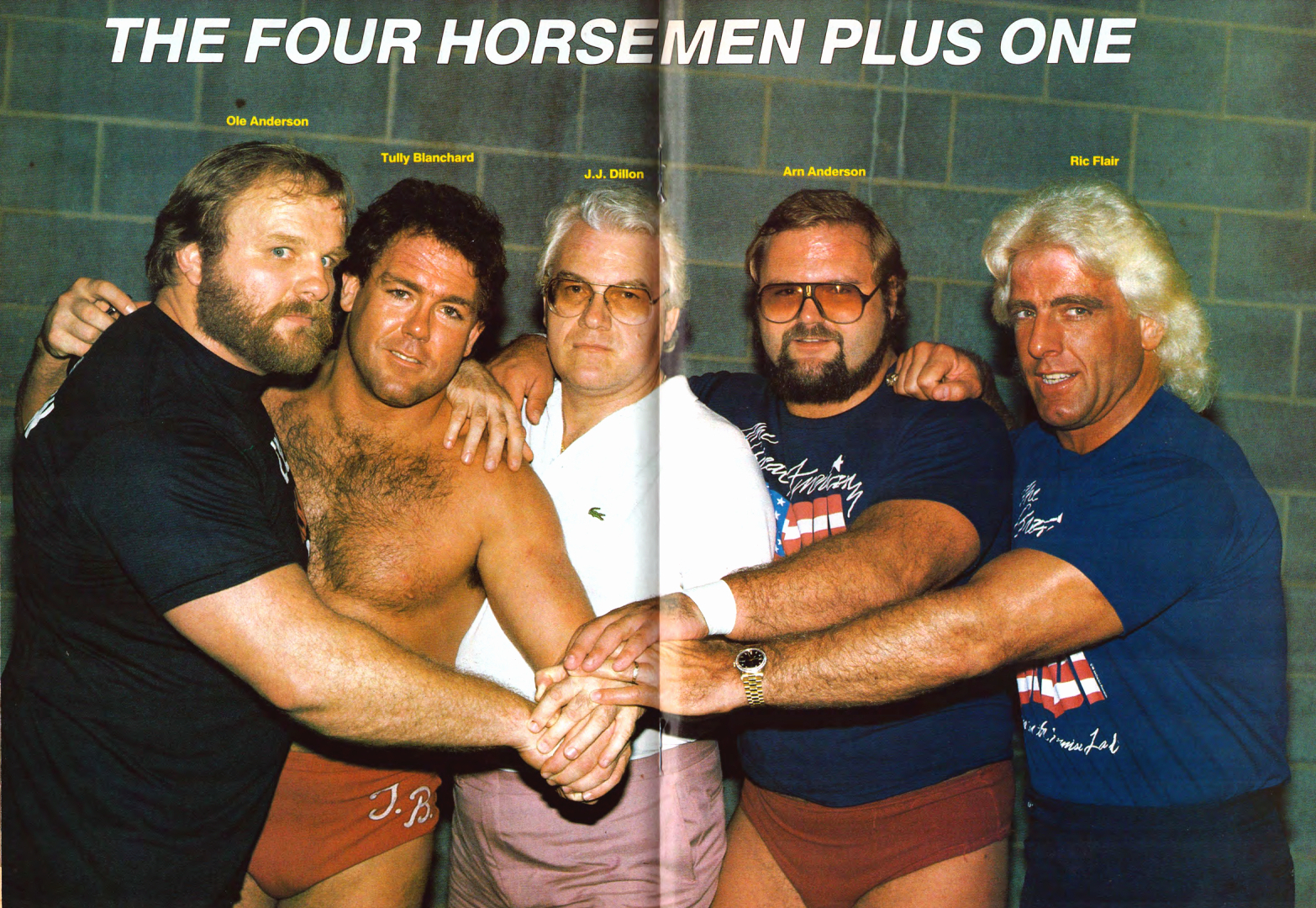
"The Four Horsemen", in 1987

In February 1987, JCP newcomer Lex Luger, who had come from Florida, was made an associate member of the group after he expressed his desire to become a Horseman. The others started to leave Ole out of things after he cost him and Arn Anderson the NWA World Tag Team Championship at Starrcade '86: The Skywalkers in 1986. Eventually he was kicked out in favor of Luger that March. The fact that Ole missed a show to watch his son Bryant wrestle in high school was used against Ole in the split as Blanchard and Dillon questioned Ole's commitment and Blanchard called Bryant a "snot-nosed kid".

During this time, they wrestled Rhodes, Nikita Koloff, the Road Warriors and Paul Ellering in a series of WarGames matches. These matches were brutal and ended up with all five members of each team in the cage at the end trying to make somebody submit. During the first match in the Omni, Dillon suffered a separated shoulder from a botched attempt at the Warriors' finishing move, the Doomsday Device. Dillon landed directly on his right arm and shoulder, and was replaced for the series of matches by the masked War Machine, later known as the Big Boss Man.

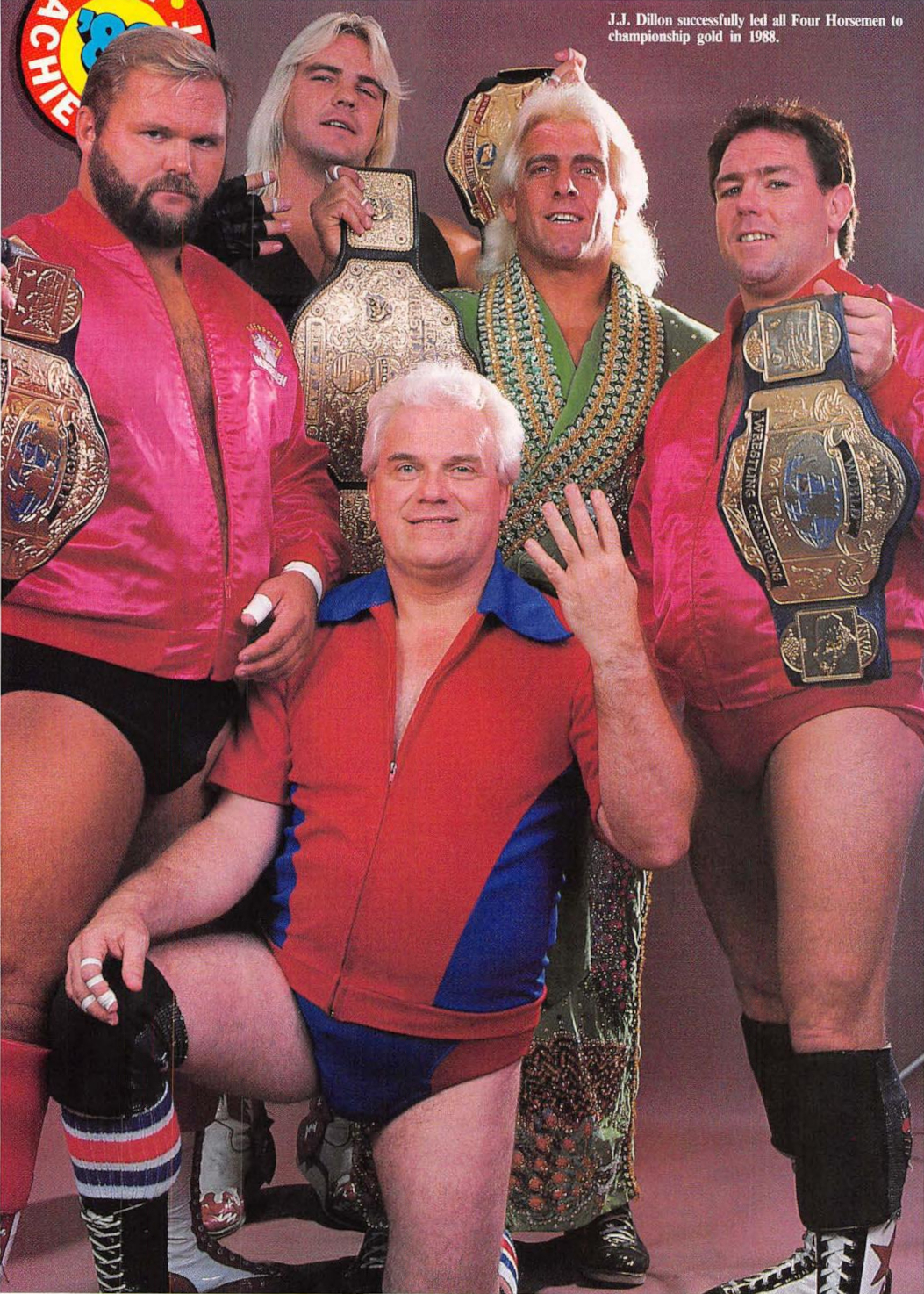
The Windham version of the Horsemen in, circa 1988

Luger was later kicked out of the Four Horsemen. First, he blamed Horseman manager J.J. Dillon for costing him the U.S. Title when Dillon's attempt to help Luger win the match, by cheating, backfired. Lex subsequently did not allow Dillon to win a Bunkhouse Stampede match as the Horsemen had agreed to among themselves. In January 1988, he teamed with Barry Windham to feud with the Horsemen. The pair even defeated Anderson and Tully Blanchard for the NWA World Tag Team Championship at Clash of the Champions I. In April 1988, Windham turned on Luger during a title defense against Anderson and Tully Blanchard. Windham then took his spot in the Horsemen. This particular lineup of Horsemen has been called the greatest faction as far as a group of technical wrestlers goes. It was at that time every major title was held by members of the faction: with Flair, as the World Heavyweight Champion; Windham, as the United States Heavyweight Champion; and Arn and Tully, as the World Tag Team Champions.

In September 1988, Arn Anderson and Tully Blanchard left to join the WWF. This forced them to drop the Tag Team Titles at the last minute to the Midnight Express (Stan Lane and Bobby Eaton). Anderson and Blanchard were known as "The Brain Busters", in the WWF, and were managed by Bobby "The Brain" Heenan.

Flair, Windham, and Dillon continued to refer to themselves as "the Horsemen" and the NWA even flirted with the idea of bringing in new members. Butch Reed was signed to wrestle solo matches with Dillon as his manager. Then, in February 1989, Barry's brother Kendall Windham appeared to have joined them and even held up the four fingers after turning on Eddie Gilbert during a tag team match. Early in 1989, Flair and Windham lost a televised tag match to Gilbert and a surprise partner, Flair's long-time rival Ricky Steamboat. An enraged and humiliated Flair immediately fired Dillon, who then left to take a front office job with the WWF, while Flair and Windham dropped the Horsemen name. Hiro Matsuda was hired as their new manager. For a short stint in JCP in 1987, Matsuda was managed by Dillon and considered an associate of the Horsemen. As a result of hiring Matsuda as their new manager the Horsemen changed their name to Yamazaki Corporation. Their major feuds were with Lex Luger, Eddie Gilbert, Ricky Steamboat, and Sting. After losing the United States Heavyweight Championship to Luger, Barry Windham left the group due to an injury. Windham suffered a broken hand which occurred in his match against Luger at Chi-Town Rumble and required surgery. This enabled Windham to leave the promotion and show up in the WWF as "The Widowmaker." Kendall was not used as much more than a jobber and the group seemed like a shell of the unit it looked like on paper when it formed. They added Michael Hayes after Barry's injury, who feuded with Luger, but the group disbanded when Hayes reformed The Fabulous Freebirds in May and Matsuda left the promotion.

The Horsemen concept helped define the NWA in the mid to late 1980s. The departure of Anderson and Blanchard was huge at the time, Dillon and Windham's departure made it worse, and despite numerous revivals over the coming decade, things were never quite the same.

=== Sting and Sid Vicious (1989–1991) ===
The Horsemen reformed in December 1989 in WCW. Flair, Arn and Ole Anderson, and long-standing rival Sting formed the group in a shocker. Tully Blanchard was set to return as well, but failed a drug test while still with the WWF. WCW, namely its head Jim Herd heard of this, and decided not to rehire him. They were faces and feuded with Gary Hart's J-Tex Corporation of Terry Funk, Great Muta, Buzz Sawyer and The Dragonmaster. At the culmination of this feud the group returned to being heels, kicking Sting out for daring to challenge Ric Flair for the World Title. "Sting, you never were a Horseman" Ric Flair would say afterwards in a TV spot, according to Arn Anderson, Sting actually requested to be taken out of the group because he wanted to be on his own. Woman soon became Flair's valet. They feuded with Luger, Sting, Rick Steiner, Scott Steiner and El Gigante during this time.

In May 1990, Ole retired from active competition and served as the group's manager, Barry Windham returned to WCW and the Horsemen on the May 5th NWA World Wide Wrestling, and Sid Vicious was added to fill out the group on the May 11th NWA Power Hour. They feuded with the Dudes With Attitudes which consisted of Sting, Luger, the Steiner Brothers, Paul Orndorff and Junkyard Dog. By the end of 1990, Ole and Woman left the NWA.

In October 1990, NWA World Champion Sting defended his title against the Horsemen's Sid Vicious at the Halloween Havoc pay-per-view. During the match, Sting and Vicious brawled backstage. A few moments later, they returned to the ring. Sting attempted to slam Sid, but lost his balance and fell to the mat with Sid on top of him. Vicious got the pin and was declared the new World Heavyweight Champion. However, it was revealed that Barry Windham (in matching Sting gear and face paint) had inserted himself into the match and let Vicious pin him. When the real Sting showed up, the match was restarted and the real Sting defeated Sid to retain the title.

The Horsemen line-up of Flair, Anderson, Windham, and Vicious eventually broke up and went their own ways. In May 1991, Sid left for the WWF. Flair was fired from WCW in early July and was in the WWF by August. Windham was part of a double turn at The Great American Bash shortly after Flair's firing, where he lost to Lex Luger in a match for the vacant WCW world championship (Luger became a heel that night, Windham began a turn to face - completed shortly after when he formed an alliance with Ron Simmons). Anderson went on to form a tag team with Larry Zbyszko called The Enforcers and later became part of the Paul E. Dangerously-led Dangerous Alliance with Zbyszko, Rick Rude, Madusa, Bobby Eaton, and Steve Austin. Anderson and Windham feuded during this time, beginning with an incident at Halloween Havoc where Arn and Zbyszko slammed a car door on Windham's hand.

=== Three Horsemen (May 1993 – December 1993) ===
The next incarnation of the Horsemen, containing only three active members, was around for fewer than seven months in 1993. Flair returned from the WWF to WCW to rejoin Arn and they promised a Horsemen reunion at the Slamboree pay-per-view. Paul Roma became the third horseman after Tully Blanchard and WCW could not come to terms on a deal for him to return. Ole Anderson was on hand as the adviser but made only one appearance on A Flair for the Gold. This group of Horsemen is considered by many wrestling fans to be the weakest incarnation of the group. They were faces again and feuded with Barry Windham and the Hollywood Blondes (Steve Austin and Brian Pillman). This group ended, due to Arn Anderson's stabbing incident with Sid Vicious during a tour of England in October, and Paul Roma turning on Erik Watts during a tag team match to join Paul Orndorff as the tag team of Pretty Wonderful. Flair went on to feud with WCW World Heavyweight Champion Big Van Vader.

=== Reformation and feud with the nWo (1995–1997) ===
In 1995, Flair and Arn (back to being heels) were teaming with Flair's former foe Vader to torment Hulk Hogan and Randy Savage. After Vader lost to Hogan in a steel cage match at Bash at the Beach, Flair entered the cage and lambasted him. Vader snapped and attacked Flair, and Arn came to his rescue. This led to a handicap match at Clash of the Champions XXXI in which Vader defeated the team of Flair and Arn. Flair and Arn began to bicker, as Flair blamed Arn for the loss and Arn always felt he was doing Flair's dirty work; a feud developed that led to a match at Fall Brawl on September 17, 1995, in Asheville, North Carolina. Arn defeated Flair with the help of Brian Pillman. Flair begged Sting to help him against them and though Sting did not trust Flair he eventually agreed. Flair ended up turning on him at Halloween Havoc to reform the Horsemen with Arn and Pillman. They added Chris Benoit to complete the group. This version of the Horsemen feuded with Hogan, Savage, Sting, and Lex Luger. Flair eventually brought back Woman and Miss Elizabeth joined the group at Superbrawl VI when she turned on Randy Savage. Miss Elizabeth left the group in October 1996 to join the nWo and Woman left the group and WCW in July 1997.

In early 1996, Pillman started his infamous "Loose Cannon" storyline and started a feud with Kevin Sullivan, the leader of the Dungeon of Doom. Pillman ended up leaving WCW, going to ECW, and eventually the WWF in February. Leading towards Uncensored the Horsemen briefly joined forces with the Dungeon of Doom as the Alliance to End Hulkamania to battle mutual rivals Hulk Hogan and Randy Savage. The two stables were unable to coexist and lost the Tower of Doom Steel Cage. The Horsemen then engaged in a brief feud with the Dungeon of Doom, including a feud between Sullivan and Benoit, which became one of the most talked about feuds of all time. In this feud, Woman, who was really married to Sullivan, left him for Benoit. However, life imitated art, and Woman actually left Sullivan for Benoit. This feud got heated and some of the matches were shoot-style with the performers using stiff or even full contact moves, rather than the typical North American style of softening maneuvers.

In June 1996 at the Great American Bash, Flair and Arn Anderson wrestled former football players Steve "Mongo" McMichael and Kevin Greene. During the match, McMichael's then-wife Debra was chased to the back by Woman and Miss Elizabeth, but later came back with them and a steel briefcase, which she handed to her husband. Mongo opened it to reveal a Horsemen T-shirt and money; after thinking it over, he closed the Haliburton briefcase and hit Greene with it, allowing Flair to score the pin on Greene. McMichael was officially inducted as the fourth Horseman, and in the process gave the group another ringside valet in Debra. The rumors said that Debra and Woman did not get along behind the scenes. This played out on TV, as they constantly bickered, and Benoit and Mongo had to step in.

When the New World Order (nWo) was founded the next month, the Horsemen became babyfaces along with the rest of the WCW roster. In September, Flair and Anderson teamed with their bitter rivals, Sting and Lex Luger, to lose to the nWo (Hogan, Scott Hall, Kevin Nash, and an impostor Sting) in the WarGames match at Fall Brawl when Luger submitted to the impostor Sting's Scorpion Deathlock. This angered Anderson, and he feuded with Luger for the next month. In October, two developments occurred that affected the group. First, Jeff Jarrett came over to WCW from the WWF, and expressed his desire to join the Horsemen. He immediately gained a fan in Ric Flair, much to the chagrin of the other Horsemen. The next week, Miss Elizabeth joined the nWo.

Flair finally let Jarrett join the group in February 1997 but the others did not want him. Jarrett began bickering with Mongo over Debra's attention, and in June won the U.S. Title from Dean Malenko, with the help of Eddie Guerrero. On the June 30, 1997 edition of Nitro he was kicked out of the stable by Flair, due to the instability Jarrett's presence caused the Horsemen. In a move uncharacteristic of the Horsemen, however, Jarrett was allowed to literally walk away, instead of receiving a beatdown as was expected. He eventually took Debra from Mongo, but Mongo took Jarrett's U.S. Title. To this date, amongst fans and members of the Four Horsemen, there is still debate whether to include Jarrett as a Horseman. In his biography, Arn Anderson states that "Jeff Jarrett was never a Horseman". His "membership" and his easy departure leave the situation ambiguous. The Four Horsemen usually picked their own members, but at the time, WCW held extreme control over storylines and this may have forced them to accept a member for those purposes only and not by choice.

In August 1997, Arn Anderson retired due to a neck/back injury that did not allow him to wrestle. Curt Hennig took his spot as "The Enforcer". The next month at Fall Brawl, Hennig turned on the Horsemen and joined the nWo. The next night on Nitro, McMichael would lose the U.S. title to Hennig as well. Flair disbanded the group on September 29, 1997, and they went their separate ways.

=== Final incarnation (1998–1999) ===
The last incarnation came in September 1998. On the September 14 edition of WCW Monday Nitro in Greenville, South Carolina when Ric Flair returned from a hiatus from the ring after a disagreement with WCW president Eric Bischoff. Dean Malenko and Chris Benoit kept going to Arn about reforming the Horsemen. He kept saying no. James J. Dillon, back in WCW's front office, even made a request. Arn eventually gave in and reformed the Horsemen with McMichael, Benoit and Malenko being presented to the ring before Flair finally being unveiled as the fourth Horseman, with Arn serving as its manager. They feuded with the nWo and Eric Bischoff.

In early 1999, the Horsemen turned heel again. Mongo had recently departed the wrestling world and they were down to Benoit, Malenko, Flair and Arn as the manager. They also had a referee biased to them, Charles Robinson, whom members of the Horsemen even referred to as "Little Nature Boy" (due to his resemblance to Flair). Flair's personal nurse, Double D (aka Asya), acted as an enforcer for the group and Ric Flair's son David Flair, who wrestled with them and wore Horsemen shirts though never an official member. Ric Flair, the (onscreen) President of WCW at this time, had awarded him with the U.S. Title and had the Horsemen help David to keep it. Eventually, Benoit and Malenko left him in May in protest over Flair's selfishness, and joined Shane Douglas and Perry Saturn to form the Revolution, thereby effectively ending the Four Horsemen.

=== Reunions (2022–present) ===
At Starrcast 2022, The Four Horsemen reunited. That July, Arn Anderson secured the copyrights to The Four Horsemen name and images. A tag team consisting of his son Brock Anderson and Brian Pillman Jr., son of late Horseman Brian Pillman, "representing The Four Horsemen" was announced to wrestle at the Jim Crockett Promotions event "Ric Flair's Last Match" with Arn Anderson managing, signaling a possible full-time return of the faction.

== Legacy ==
The original Four Horsemen, widely regarded as the greatest pro wrestling stable of all time, were innovative in developing and popularizing the concept of heel stables. On the 2007 Four Horsemen DVD, commentator Jim Ross stated "without the Horsemen there would damn sure be no nWo or no DX".

=== Evolution ===
In 2003, rumors began circulating that Ric Flair (at the time working for the World Wrestling Entertainment) was going to reform the Four Horsemen with Triple H, Randy Orton, and Batista. This group was eventually formed, but under the name Evolution instead of the Four Horsemen, and with Triple H as the leader instead of Flair. They served much the same function as the original heel Horsemen had, dominating the titles on Raw and feuding with that brand's top faces. The group slowly died between August 2004 and October 2005. Orton was kicked out of the group after he won the World Heavyweight Championship, which Triple H coveted. In February 2005, Batista left the group after winning the Royal Rumble, in a storyline where Triple H tried to protect his title from Batista. During a Triple H hiatus, Flair turned face, and at Raw Homecoming, Triple H returned as a face, but turned heel by the end of the night, hitting Flair in the face with a sledgehammer and officially ending Evolution. At Raw 15th Anniversary, an Evolution reunion as faces took place, though then-heel Randy Orton refused to participate and instead challenged the face versions of Flair, Batista, and Triple H to a match in which he partnered with then-heel, Edge and Umaga, and at the same time reforming Rated-RKO for one night. On the March 31, 2008 episode of Raw, Flair delivered his farewell address. Afterward, Triple H brought out many current and retired superstars to thank Flair for all he has done, including Four Horsemen members, Arn Anderson, Tully Blanchard, Barry Windham, J. J. Dillon, and Dean Malenko. Also, it was the night in which Evolution got back together in the ring, except for Randy Orton (who was outside the ring). This would mark the last time both groups would be in the ring together.

On the April 14, 2014 episode of Raw, Triple H, Orton, and Batista reunited Evolution full-time, once again heels, to feud with The Shield. However, on the April 28, 2014 episode of Raw, Flair showed his endorsement for The Shield, effectively turning his back on his old teammates, thus not turning heel.

=== The Xtreme Horsemen ===
The Xtreme Horsemen was a professional wrestling stable in Turnbuckle Championship Wrestling, and later Major League Wrestling, who disbanded in 2004. The group's name was in homage to the Four Horsemen, who in the 1980s were one of professional wrestling's top draws worldwide. The group came together in Dusty Rhodes' Turnbuckle Championship Wrestling promotion, but the group later left Rhodes' promotion to join Major League Wrestling where Steve Corino and "The Enforcer" C.W. Anderson were joined by former ECW superstars Justin Credible and Simon Diamond. This incarnation was briefly managed by former Four Horsemen manager J. J. Dillon before Major League Wrestling ceased operations. Barry Windham also joined the group for a single War Games match. Corino has used the group name several other times with various teammates in other promotions.

=== Fortune ===
Fortune (originally spelled Fourtune) was a professional wrestling stable in Total Nonstop Action Wrestling, started by Ric Flair on June 17, 2010, as a "reformed" version of the Four Horsemen. Flair had been loosely associated with A.J. Styles, Desmond Wolfe, Beer Money, Inc. (James Storm and Robert Roode) and Kazarian since April 5, 2010. Flair stated that whoever wanted to join Fortune would have to earn their place in the stable. On July 11 at Victory Road, Styles and Kazarian became the first official members of Fortune by defeating Samoa Joe and Rob Terry in a tag team match. On the July 29 edition of Impact!, Flair made James Storm and Robert Roode the final two members of Fortune. However, on the August 12 edition of Impact! Douglas Williams, who had helped Flair defeat his nemesis Jay Lethal the previous week, and Matt Morgan were added to Fortune as the stable assaulted EV 2.0, a stable consisting of former Extreme Championship Wrestling performers. Fortune later merged with Hulk Hogan and Eric Bischoff's Immortal stable, but turned on them months later, splitting them into two feuding factions. Ric Flair would turn on Fortune and remain associated with Immortal.

=== The Four Horsewomen ===
The stable was invoked by mixed martial artists Ronda Rousey, Shayna Baszler, Jessamyn Duke, and Marina Shafir (Invicta Fighter), who named themselves "The Four Horsewomen" in 2013, with the blessing of Anderson and Flair. After Bethe Correia defeated Duke, she held up four fingers and symbolically put one down. She did this again after beating Baszler. As Shafir is not in the UFC, these two wins set the stage for a bantamweight title fight between her and Rousey at UFC 190. Rousey knocked Correia out in 34 seconds.

The group was shown at ringside during WrestleMania 31, where Rousey was later involved in an in-ring segment with The Rock, Triple H and Stephanie McMahon. Baszler and Rousey first signed with WWE, where the former quickly became the NXT Women's Champion, and the latter had a high-profile debut match at Wrestlemania 34 before pursuing and winning the WWE Raw Women's Championship. Shafir eventually joined the WWE Performance Center, completing the foursome's transition to professional wrestling.

The WWE female wrestlers Charlotte Flair (Ric Flair's daughter), Sasha Banks, Bayley and Becky Lynch have referred to themselves as "The Four Horsewomen" (originally "The Four Horsewomen of NXT" when the four had only been a part of that brand), and posed in ring at NXT TakeOver: Brooklyn, following a match between Bayley and Banks, each with four fingers held up. The WWE's Four Horsewomen were partly responsible for changing the WWE's Women Division from sex appeal to true athleticism. Banks and Bayley would later form a tag team known as the Boss 'n' Hug Connection.

Both Four Horsewomen groups were at the Mae Young Classic tapings on July 14, 2017, where Baszler defeated Zeda, Mia Yim, Candice LeRae and Mercedes Martinez to advance into the finals, losing to Kairi Sane.

All four of the Four Horsewomen of UFC would reappear on WWE Evolution where Duke and Shafir interfered on Baszler's behalf to win the NXT Women's Championship from Kairi Sane and Rousey defended her WWE Raw Women's Championship against Nikki Bella. All four of the WWE Four Horsewomen would be involved at the event as well: Charlotte Flair and Becky Lynch competed in a Last Woman Standing Match while Sasha Banks and Bayley teamed with Natalya to take on The Riott Squad.

The WWE Four Horsewomen would compete against each other with Banks and Bayley (as heels) taking on Lynch and Flair in a tag team match on the September 9, 2019 edition of Raw from the Madison Square Garden, in which the latter team emerged victorious.

== Members ==
=== Main ===
==== Original members ====
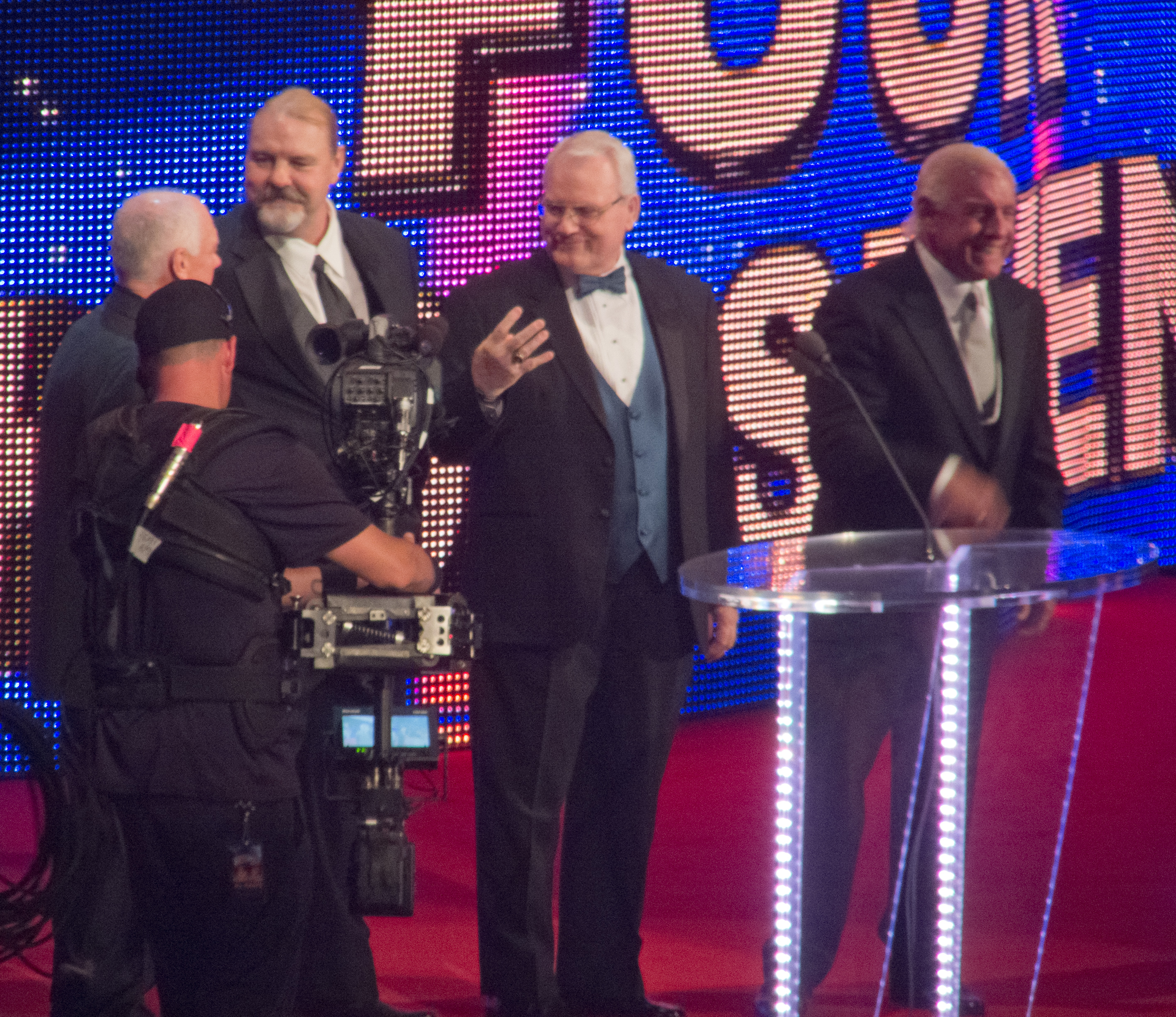
The Four Horsemen being inducted into the WWE Hall of Fame in 2012

- Ric Flair (leader) (1985–1991, 1993, 1995–1997, 1998–1999)
- Arn Anderson (1985–1991, 1993, 1995–1997, 1998–1999)
- Ole Anderson (1985–1987, 1989–1990, 1993)
- Tully Blanchard (1985–1988)

==== Later members ====
- Lex Luger (1987)
- Barry Windham (1988–1989, 1990–1991)
- Sting (1989–1990)
- Sid Vicious (1990–1991)
- Paul Roma (May 23, 1993 – December 11, 1993)
- Brian Pillman (1995–1996)
- Chris Benoit (1995–1997, 1998–1999)
- Steve McMichael (1996–1997, 1998–1999)
- Jeff Jarrett (February 23, 1997 – June 23, 1997)
- Curt Hennig (August 25, 1997 – September 14, 1997)
- Dean Malenko (September 14, 1998 – May 24, 1999)

=== Honorary members ===
- Harley Race (March 31, 2007)
- Dusty Rhodes (March 31, 2007)

=== Managers and valets ===
- J. J. Dillon (1985–1989, manager)
- Baby Doll (Blanchard's valet)
- Dark Journey (Blanchard's valet)
- Hiro Matsuda (manager)
- Woman (Ric Flair, Arn Anderson, and Chris Benoit's valet)
- Miss Elizabeth (Ric Flair, Arn Anderson, and Chris Benoit's valet)
- Debra McMichael (Steve McMichael's wife and later Jeff Jarrett's valet)
- Bobby Heenan (coach, The Great American Bash (1996) only)
- Double D (Ric Flair's nurse and later valet)

== Championships and accomplishments ==
- Jim Crockett Promotions / World Championship Wrestling
  - NWA National Heavyweight Championship (1 time) – Tully Blanchard
  - NWA National Tag Team Championship (1 time) – Ole and Arn Anderson
  - NWA (Mid-Atlantic)/WCW United States Heavyweight Championship (5 times) – Tully Blanchard (1), Lex Luger (1), Barry Windham (1), Ric Flair (1), Steve McMichael (1)
  - NWA World Heavyweight Championship (6 times) – Ric Flair
  - NWA (Mid-Atlantic)/WCW World Tag Team Championship (4 times) – Arn Anderson and Tully Blanchard (2), Arn Anderson and Paul Roma (1), Chris Benoit and Dean Malenko (1)
  - NWA/WCW World Television Championship (10 times) – Arn Anderson (4), Tully Blanchard (3), Ric Flair (2), Barry Windham (1)
  - WCW World Heavyweight Championship (8 times) – Ric Flair
- Pro Wrestling Illustrated
  - Feud of the Year – Four Horsemen vs. The Super Powers and The Road Warriors (1987), Ric Flair vs. Lex Luger (1988), Ric Flair vs. Terry Funk (1989), Ric Flair vs. Lex Luger (1990)
  - Manager of the Year – J. J. Dillon (1988)
  - Match of the Year – Ric Flair vs. Dusty Rhodes (1986), Ric Flair vs Ricky Steamboat (1989)
  - Most Hated Wrestler of the Year – Ric Flair (1987)
  - Wrestler of the Year – Ric Flair (1985, 1986, 1989)
  - Ric Flair was ranked No. 2 of the 500 best singles wrestlers of the PWI Years in 2003
- WWE
  - WWE Hall of Fame (Class of 2012) – Ric Flair, Arn Anderson, Tully Blanchard, Barry Windham, and J. J. Dillon
- Wrestling Observer Newsletter
  - Best Heel – Ric Flair (1990)
  - Best on Interviews – Arn Anderson (1990), Ric Flair (1991, 1994)
  - Feud of the Year – Ric Flair vs. Terry Funk (1989)
  - Match of the Year – Ric Flair vs. Barry Windham (1986), Ric Flair vs. Sting (1988), Ric Flair vs. Ricky Steamboat (1989)
  - Most Charismatic – Ric Flair (1993)
  - Most Outstanding Wrestler – Ric Flair (1986, 1987, 1989)
  - Readers' Favorite Wrestler – Ric Flair (1985–1993)
  - Wrestler of the Year – Ric Flair (1985, 1986, 1989, 1990)
