= 1991 in professional wrestling =

1991 in professional wrestling describes the year's events in the world of professional wrestling.

== List of notable promotions ==
These promotions held notable events in 1991.

Promotion Name	Abbreviation	Notes
All Japan Women's Pro-Wrestling	AJW	
Catch Wrestling Association	CWA	
Empresa Mexicana de Lucha Libre/Consejo Mundial de Lucha Libre	EMLL/CMLL	During the fall, EMLL was renamed to CMLL.
Frontier Martial-Arts Wrestling	FMW	
New Japan Pro-Wrestling	NJPW	
Universal Wrestling Association	UWA	
Universal Wrestling Federation	UWF	
World Championship Wrestling	WCW	
World Wrestling Council	WWC	
World Wrestling Federation	WWF	

== Calendar of notable shows ==
Date	Promotion(s)	Event	Location	Main Event
January 11	AJW	All Japan Women's event at Kawasaki-shi Taiikukan	Kawasaki, Japan	Bull Nakano and Kyoko Inoue defeat Aja Kong and Bison Kimura in a tag team hair vs hair match
January 19	WWF	Royal Rumble	Miami, Florida	Hulk Hogan won by last eliminating Earthquake in the 30-man Royal Rumble match
January 27	UWA	UWA 16th Anniversary Show	Naucalpan, Mexico	Mil Mascaras, Dos Caras and El Canek defeated The Hawaiian Beasts (Fatu, Kokina and Nikozuna) in a Best two out of three falls Six-man tag team match
January 30	WCW	Clash of the Champions XIV: Dixie Dynamite	Gainesville, Georgia	Ric Flair (c) fought Scott Steiner to a draw in a Singles match for the WCW World Heavyweight Championship
February 24	WCW	WrestleWar	Phoenix, Arizona	The Four Horsemen (Ric Flair, Barry Windham and Sid Vicious) and Larry Zbyszko defeated Sting, Brian Pillman and The Steiner Brothers (Rick Steiner and Scott Steiner) in a WarGames match
March 21	WCW; NJPW	WCW/New Japan Supershow I	Tokyo, Japan	Tatsumi Fujinami (IWGP Champion) defeated Ric Flair (NWA Champion) in a Title for Title for the NWA World Heavyweight Championship and the IWGP Heavyweight Championship
March 24	WWF	WrestleMania VII	Los Angeles, California	Hulk Hogan defeated Sgt. Slaughter (c) in a Singles match for the WWF Championship
March 30	WWF / SWS	WrestleFest	Tokyo, Japan	The Legion of Doom (Road Warrior Hawk & Road Warrior Animal) beat Hulk Hogan & Genichiro Tenryu via countout
April 15	WWF	Saturday Night's Main Event	Omaha, Nebraska	20-Man Battle Royal
April 24	WWF	UK Rampage	London, England	Hulk Hogan (c) defeated Sgt. Slaughter in a Singles match for the WWF Championship
May 19	WCW	SuperBrawl I	St. Petersburg, Florida	Ric Flair (c-WCW) defeated Tatsumi Fujinami (c-NWA) in a Singles match for the NWA and WCW World Heavyweight Championships
June 9	UWF	Beach Brawl	Palmetto, Florida	Steve Williams defeated Bam Bam Bigelow in a Tournament final for the inaugural UWF SportsChannel Television Championship
June 12	WCW	Clash of the Champions XV: Knocksville USA	Knoxville, Tennessee	Ric Flair (c) defeated Bobby Eaton 2-1 in a Two-out-of-three falls match for the WCW World Heavyweight Championship
July 6	WWC	WWC 18th Aniversario	Bayamón, Puerto Rico	Dino Bravo defeated Carlos Colón (c) via reverse decision in a Singles match for the WWC Universal Heavyweight Championship with El Vikingo as the special referee.
July 14	WCW	The Great American Bash	Baltimore, Maryland	Rick Steiner defeated Arn Anderson and Paul E. Dangerously in a Steel Cage match
Aug 11	NJPW	G1 Climax	Tokyo, Japan	Keiji Mutoh defeated Masahiro Chono in the finals
August 18	AJW	All Japan Women's event at Korakuen Hall	Tokyo, Japan	Kyoko Inoue defeats Bison Kimura in the finals of the Japan Grand Prix 1991
August 26	WWF	SummerSlam	New York City, New York	Hulk Hogan and Ultimate Warrior defeated the Triangle of Terror (Col. Mustafa, General Adnan and Sgt. Slaughter) in a handicap match with Sid Justice as special guest referee
September 5	WCW	Clash of the Champions XVI: Fall Brawl	Augusta, Georgia	The Enforcers (Arn Anderson and Larry Zbyszko) defeated Rick Steiner and Bill Kazmaier in a tag team match for the vacant WCW World Tag Team Championship
September 7	WWF	King of the Ring	Providence, Rhode Island	Bret Hart defeated Irwin R. Schyster in a King of the Ring tournament final match
September 7	AJW	Exciting Zone Omiya Night	Omiya, Japan	Bull Nakano (c) defeats Kyoko Inoue in a WWWA World Title match
September 8	EMLL	EMLL 58th Anniversary Show	Mexico City, Mexico	Konnan defeated Perro Aguayo, Cien Caras was also on the match in a Best two-out-of-three falls Lucha de Apuestas, triangular hair vs. hair match
September 23	FMW	FMW 2nd Anniversary Show	Kawasaki, Kanagawa, Japan	Atsushi Onita defeated Tarzan Goto by knockout in a No Rope Exploding Barbed Wire Steel Cage Deathmatch
October 3	WWF	Battle Royal at the Albert Hall	London, England	The British Bulldog won by last eliminating Typhoon in a 20-man battle royal
October 27	WCW	Halloween Havoc	Chattanooga, Tennessee	Lex Luger (c) defeated Ron Simmons in a Two-out-of-three-falls match for the WCW World Heavyweight Championship
November 19	WCW	Clash of the Champions XVII	Savannah, Georgia	Lex Luger (c) defeated Rick Steiner in a Singles match for the WCW World Heavyweight Championship
November 21	AJW	Wrestle Marinepiad '91	Kawasaki, Japan	Bull Nakano and Monster Ripper defeat Aja Kong and Bison Kimura in a cage match. Nakano and Ripper then advance into a singles cage match which Nakano wins.
November 27	WWF	Survivor Series	Detroit, Michigan	The Undertaker defeated Hulk Hogan (c) in a Singles match for the WWF World Heavyweight Championship
December 3	WWF	This Tuesday in Texas	San Antonio, Texas	Hulk Hogan defeated The Undertaker (c) in a Singles match for the WWF World Heavyweight Championship
December 9	AJW	All Japan Women's event at Korakuen Hall	Tokyo, Japan	Toshiyo Yamada and Kyoko Inoue defeat Aja Kong and Bison Kimura in the finals of Tag League the Best 1991
December 12	WWF / SWS	SuperWrestle	Tokyo, Japan	Hulk Hogan defeated Genichiro Tenryu
December 13	CMLL	Juicio Final	Mexico City, Mexico	Máscara Año 2000 defeated Aníbal (2-1) in a Best two-out-of-three falls Lucha de Apuestas mask vs. mask match
December 21	CWA	Euro Catch Festival	Bremen, Germany	Rambo (c) defeated Ken Patera in Round 8 in a Singles match for the CWA World Heavyweight Championship
December 29	WCW	Starrcade	Norfolk, Virginia	Sting last eliminated Lex Luger to win the Battlebowl battle royal
(c) – denotes defending champion(s)

== Accomplishments and tournaments ==
=== AJW ===
Accomplishment	Winner	Date won	Notes
Japan Grand Prix 1991	Kyoko Inoue	August 18	
Rookie of the Year Decision Tournament	Akemi Torisu		
Tag League The Best 1991	Kyoko Inoue and Toshiyo Yamada	December 9	

=== AJPW ===
Accomplishment	Winner	Date won	Notes
Champion Carnival 1991	Jumbo Tsuruta	April 18	
World's Strongest Determination League 1991	Terry Gordy and Steve Williams	December 6	

=== JWP ===
Accomplishment	Winner	Date won	Notes
Rookie of the Year Tournament	Yasha Kurenai	February 11	

=== WCW ===
Accomplishment	Winner	Date won	Notes
WCW United States Championship Tournament	Sting	August 25	
WCW World Tag Team Championship Tournament	The Enforcers (Arn Anderson and Larry Zbyszko)	September 5	
WCW Light Heavyweight Championship Tournament	Brian Pillman	October 27	

=== WWF ===
Accomplishment	Winner	Date won	Notes
Royal Rumble	Hulk Hogan	January 19	
King of the Ring	Bret Hart	September 7	

== Awards and honors ==
=== Pro Wrestling Illustrated ===
Category	Winner
PWI Wrestler of the Year	Hulk Hogan
PWI Tag Team of the Year	The Enforcers (Arn Anderson and Larry Zbyszko)
PWI Match of the Year	Steiner Brothers (Rick Steiner and Scott Steiner) vs. Sting and Lex Luger (SuperBrawl I)
PWI Feud of the Year	Ultimate Warrior vs. The Undertaker
PWI Most Popular Wrestler of the Year	Sting
PWI Most Hated Wrestler of the Year	Sgt. Slaughter
PWI Most Improved Wrestler of the Year	Dustin Rhodes
PWI Most Inspirational Wrestler of the Year	The Patriot
PWI Rookie of the Year	Johnny B. Badd
PWI Lifetime Achievement	The Fabulous Moolah
PWI Editor's Award	Bobby Heenan

=== Wrestling Observer Newsletter ===
Category	Winner
Wrestler of the Year	Jumbo Tsuruta
Most Outstanding	Jushin Thunder Liger
Feud of the Year	Mitsuharu Misawa and company vs. Jumbo Tsuruta and company
Tag Team of the Year	Mitsuharu Misawa and Toshiaki Kawada
Most Improved	Dustin Rhodes
Best on Interviews	Ric Flair

== Title changes ==
=== WWF ===
WWF World Heavyweight Championship
Incoming champion – Ultimate Warrior
Date	Winner	Event/Show	Note(s)
January 19	Sgt. Slaughter	Royal Rumble	
March 24	Hulk Hogan	WrestleMania VII	
November 27	The Undertaker	Survivor Series	
December 3	Hulk Hogan	This Tuesday in Texas	
December 4	Vacant	Superstars of Wrestling	Hogan was stripped of the title by WWF President Jack Tunney due to the controversy surrounding both of the previous title changes. It aired on tape delay on December 7, 1991.

WWF Intercontinental Championship
Incoming champion – Mr. Perfect
Date	Winner	Event/Show	Note(s)
August 26	Bret Hart	SummerSlam	

WWF Intercontinental Tag Team Championship
(Title created)
Date	Winner	Event/Show	Note(s)
January 7	Perro Aguayo and Gran Hamada	N/A	Later abandoned in 1991.

WWF Tag Team Championship
Incoming champions – The Hart Foundation (Bret Hart and Jim Neidhart)
Date	Winner	Event/Show	Note(s)
March 24	The Nasty Boys (Brian Knobbs and Jerry Sags)	WrestleMania VII	
August 26	The Legion of Doom (Animal and Hawk)	SummerSlam	

Million Dollar Championship
Incoming champion – Ted DiBiase
unsanctioned championship
Date	Winner	Event/Show	Note(s)
August 26	Virgil	SummerSlam	
November 11	Ted DiBiase	Survivor Series Showdown	This program aired on tape delay on November 24, 1991.

=== WCW ===
WCW World Heavyweight Championship
(Title created)
Date	Winner	Event/Show	Note(s)
January 11	Ric Flair	House show	Defeated Sting for the NWA World Heavyweight Championship. WCW began recognizing Flair as WCW World Heavyweight Champion while still using the NWA belt (i.e. the Big Gold Belt); WWE recognizes this reign as an NWA world title reign (and not a WCW one)
July 1	Vacant		Ric Flair left for the World Wrestling Federation (WWF) and was stripped of the title. When Flair left, he took the Big Gold Belt, which represented the NWA and WCW world titles, with him.
July 14	Lex Luger	The Great American Bash	

WCW United States Heavyweight Championship
Incoming champion – Lex Luger
Date	Winner	Event/Show	Note(s)
July 14	Vacant	The Great American Bash	Vacated when Lex Luger won the WCW World Heavyweight Championship
August 25	Sting	House show	Defeated Steve Austin in a tournament final
November 19	Rick Rude	Clash of the Champions XVII	

WCW United States Tag Team Championship
Incoming champions – The Steiner Brothers (Rick and Scott Steiner)
Date	Winner	Event/Show	Note(s)
April 6	Vacant	World Wide Wrestling	
May 19	The Fabulous Freebirds (Jimmy Garvin and Michael Hayes)	SuperBrawl	Defeated The Young Pistols for the vacant title
August 12	The Patriots (Todd Champion and Firebreaker Chip)	World Championship Wrestling	
November 5	The Young Pistols (Steve Armstrong and Tracy Smothers)	Main Event	

WCW World Television Championship
Incoming champion – "Z-Man" Tom Zenk
Date	Winner	Event/Show	Note(s)
January 7	Arn Anderson	World Wide Wrestling	
May 19	Bobby Eaton	SuperBrawl	
June 3	Steve Austin	World Wide Wrestling	

WCW Light Heavyweight Championship
(Title created)
Date	Winner	Event/Show	Note(s)
October 27	Brian Pillman	Halloween Havoc	Defeated Richard Morton in the finals of a tournament to decide the inaugural champion.
December 25	Jushin Thunder Liger	House show	

WCW World Tag Team Championship
Incoming champions – Doom (Ron Simmons and Butch Reed)
Date	Winner	Event/Show	Note(s)
February 24	The Fabulous Freebirds (Jimmy Garvin and Michael Hayes)	WrestleWar	
February 18	The Steiner Brothers (Rick and Scott Steiner)	Pro	
July 20	Vacant	WCW	
September 5	The Enforcers (Arn Anderson and Larry Zbyszko)	Clash of the Champions XVI: Fall Brawl	
November 19	Ricky Steamboat and Dustin Rhodes	Clash of the Champions XVII	

WCW World Six-Man Tag Team Championship
(Title created)
Date	Winner	Event/Show	Note(s)
February 17	Junkyard Dog, Ricky Morton and Tommy Rich	House show	
June 3	The Fabulous Freebirds (Brad Armstrong, Jimmy Garvin and Michael Hayes)	WCW Main Event	Aired on June 30
August 5	Big Josh, Dustin Rhodes and Tom Zenk	WCW Worldwide	Aired on August 24
October 8	The York Foundation (Richard Morton, Thomas Rich and Terrance Taylor)	WCW Main Event	Aired on November 10
December 1	Deactivated	N/A	

== Births ==
- January 9 – Ruby Riott, American wrestler
- January 12 - Raquel Rodriguez (wrestler)
- January 17 – Alexander Hammerstone
- January 28 – Bronson Matthews, American wrestler
- January 30 – Natsuko Tora
- February 1 – Saori Anou
- February 4 – Santana
- February 5 – Brennan Williams, American wrestler
- February 7 – Hikuleo
- February 12 – Boby Zavala, Mexican luchador
- February 13 – Sumika Yanagawa
- February 15 – Rich Swann
- February 19 – David Starr
- February 25 – Toru
- April 4 – Chelsea Green, Canadian female wrestler
- April 17 – Jun Masaoka
- May 6 – Piper Niven, Scottish wrestler
- May 13 – Scarlett Bordeaux
- May 31 – Cody Hall, American wrestler
- June 4 – Joji Otani
- June 12 – Tomoyuki Oka, Japanese wrestler
- June 19 – Dilsher Shanky
- June 25 – Jessika Carr
- July 7 – Josh Woods, American wrestler
- July 21 – Adam Page, American wrestler
- August 9 – Alexa Bliss
- August 13 – Momo Tani
- September 14 – Dale Patricks
- September 27 – Ortiz
- November 2 - Amber Nova
- November 18 – AJ Gray
- December 8 – Sarah Bäckman
- December 18 – Flip Gordon
- December 21 – Otis Dozovic, American wrestler
- December 24 – Silas Mason

== Debuts ==
- Uncertain debut date

- Michael Modest
- Simon Diamond
- Bart Gunn
- Tony DeVito
- Vladimir Koloff

- January 11 - Hiroyoshi Tenzan
- January 25 - Ishinriki Kōji
- May 5 - Hayabusa
- July 7 - Road Dogg
- July 16 - Satoshi Kojima
- August 1 - Mitsuya Nagai
- August 4 - Mizuki Endo (LLPW)
- August 7 - Hideki Hosaka and Katsunari Toi
- September 16 - Hikaru Kawabata
- September 20 - Masayoshi Motegi and Hiroshi Shimada
- October 4 - Rie Tamada (All Japan Women's), Kumiko Maekawa (All Japan Women's) and Chikako Shiratori (All Japan Women's)
- November 20 - Disco Inferno
- November 25 - Command Bolshoi
- December 10 - Hirofumi Miura

== Retirements ==
- Rocky Johnson (1964–1991)
- Angelo Poffo (1949–1991)
- Smith Hart (1973–1991)
- Trudy Adams (1987–1991)
- Tojo Yamamoto (1953–1991)
- Ron Bass (1971–1991)
- S. D. Jones (1971–1991)
- Bugsy McGraw (1967–1991)
- Bobby Jaggers (1972–1991)
- Cody Michaels (1986–1991)
- Dennis Stamp (1971–1991)
- Donna Christianello (1963–1991)
- Harley Race (1960–1991)
- Itzuki Yamazaki (1981–1991)
- Lady Blossom (1979–1991)
- Joyce Grable (1971–1991)
- Mark Rocco (1972–1991)
- Mike George (1969–1991)
- Buzz Sawyer (1978–1991)

== Deaths ==
- January 21 – Nick Gulas, American wrestling promoter (b. 1914)
- April 23 – Frankie Williams (wrestler), American wrestler (b. 1940)
- June 30 – Duke Keomuka, Japanese wrestler (b. 1921)
- July 6 – Mr. Moto (wrestler), American wrestler (b. 1915)
- August 15 – Tank Morgan, American wrestler (b. 1933)
- August 25 – Vivian Vachon, Canadian wrestler (b. 1951)
- August 27 – Martín Karadagian, Argentina wrestler (b. 1922)
- September 12 – Chris Von Erich, American wrestler (b. 1969)
- September 30 – King Levinsky, American wrestle and boxer (b. 1910)
- October 27 – Rocky Hata, Japanese wrestler (b. 1948)
- October 31 – Gene Anderson, American wrestler (b. 1939)
- November 9 – Abe Yourist, Russian wrestler (b. 1909)
- November 10 – Dick the Bruiser, American wrestler (b. 1929)
- November 12 – Ripper Collins, American wrestler (b. 1933)
- November 20 – Frank Sexton (wrestler) (born 1910)
- December 25 – Wilbur Snyder, American wrestler (b. 1929)

== See also ==
- List of WCW pay-per-view events
- List of WWF pay-per-view events
- List of FMW supercards and pay-per-view events
