= Fantastic Story in Tokyo Dome =

1993 professional wrestling event in Tokyo, Japan

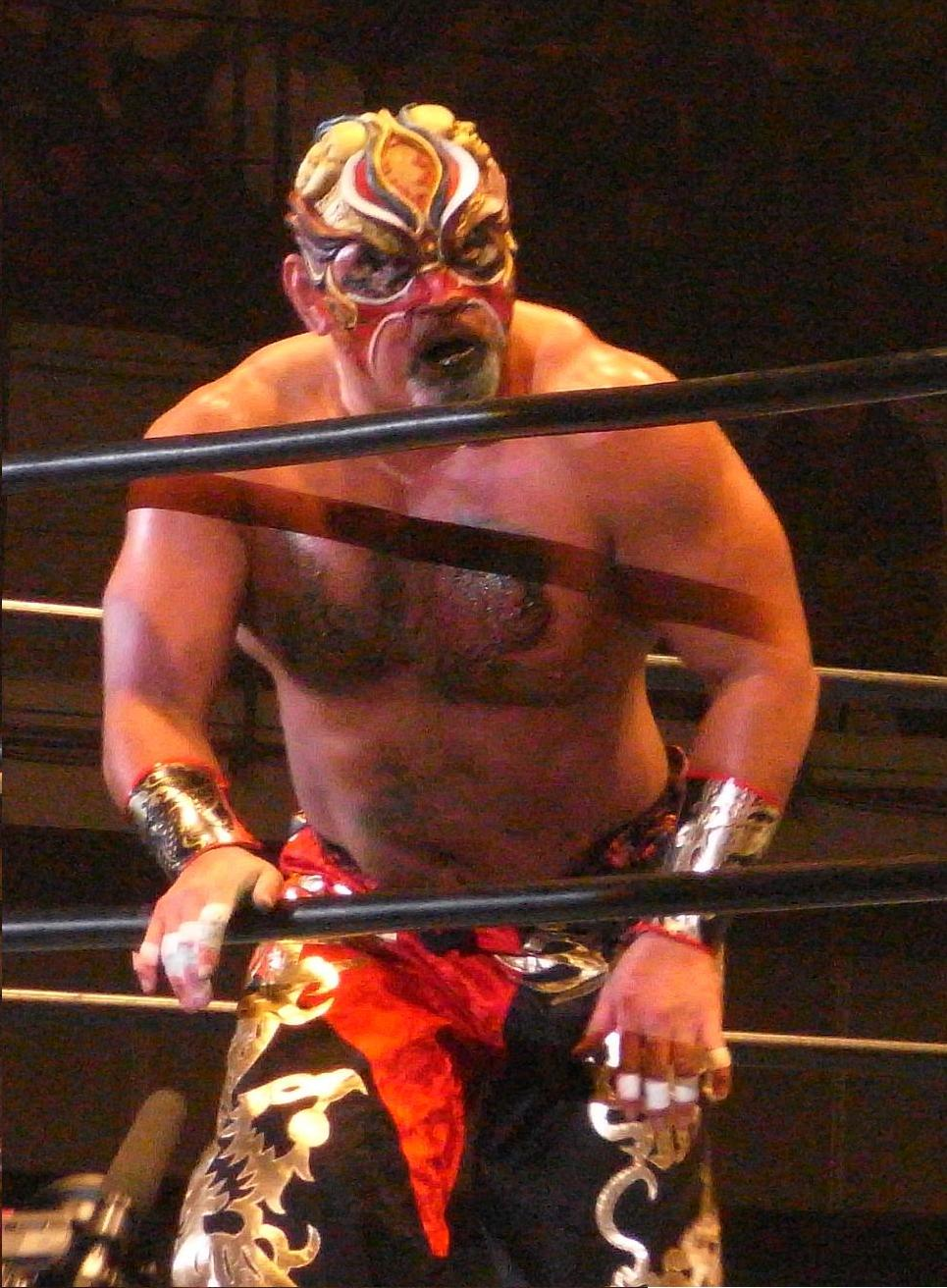
- The Great Muta, who won the NWA World Heavyweight Championship at the event.
- Promotion(s): New Japan Pro-Wrestling; World Championship Wrestling
- Date: January 4, 1993
- City: Tokyo, Japan
- Venue: Tokyo Dome
- Attendance: 53,500

Pay-per-view chronology
← Previous; Super Warriors in Tokyo Dome	Next → Wrestling Dontaku 1993

January 4 Tokyo Dome Show chronology
← Previous; Super Warriors in Tokyo Dome	Next → Battlefield

Fantastic Story in Tokyo Dome was a professional wrestling event co-produced by the New Japan Pro-Wrestling (NJPW) and World Championship Wrestling (WCW) promotions. The show took place on January 4, 1993 in Tokyo's Tokyo Dome and aired later the same day on TV Asahi in Japan and on pay-per-view in March 1993 in the United States. Officially, the show drew 53,500 spectators and $3,500,000 in ticket sales. This was the second year that the show was co-promoted by the American WCW promotion. The show featured 10 matches, including four matches that featured WCW wrestlers.

Fantastic Story featured three title matches, including Jushin Thunder Liger defeating Último Dragón to win the IWGP Junior Heavyweight Championship. IWGP Heavyweight Champion The Great Muta defeated Masahiro Chono to win the NWA World Heavyweight Championship in a match where the IWGP title was also on the line. Finally the show featured an IWGP Tag Team Championship match between The Hell Raisers (Hawk Warrior and Power Warrior) and The Steiner Brothers (Rick Steiner and Scott Steiner) that ended without a definitive winner. The show was later shown on pay-per-view (PPV) in North America as WCW/New Japan Supershow III.

== Production ==
Other on-screen personnel
Role:	Name:
English Commentators	Kevin Kelly
English Commentators	Chris Charlton
English Commentators	Rocky Romero
Japanese Commentators	Shinpei Nogami
Japanese Commentators	Milano Collection A.T.
Japanese Commentators	Katsuhiko Kanazawa
Japanese Commentators	Kazuyoshi Sakai
Japanese Commentators	Togi Makabe
Ring announcers	Makoto Abe
Ring announcers	Kimihiko Ozaki
Referees	Kenta Sato
Referees	Marty Asami
Referees	Red Shoes Unno

=== Background ===
The January 4 Tokyo Dome Show is NJPW's biggest annual event and has been called "the largest professional wrestling show in the world outside of the United States" and the "Japanese equivalent to the Super Bowl".

=== Storylines ===
Fantastic Story in Tokyo Dome featured professional wrestling matches that involved different wrestlers from pre-existing scripted feuds and storylines. Wrestlers portrayed villains, heroes, or less distinguishable characters in scripted events that built tension and culminated in a wrestling match or series of matches.

== Results ==
No.	Results	Stipulations	Times
1	Takayuki Iizuka, Akira Nogami and El Samurai defeated Nobukazu Hirai, Koki Kitahara and Masao Orihara	Six-man tag team match	15:11
2	Akitoshi Saito, The Great Kabuki, Masashi Aoyagi and Shiro Koshinaka defeated Hiro Saito, Norio Honaga and Super Strong Machine and Tatsutoshi Goto	Eight-man tag team match	14:20
3	Jushin Thunder Liger defeated Último Dragón (c)	Singles match for the IWGP Junior Heavyweight Championship	20:09
4	Ron Simmons defeated Tony Halme	Singles match	06:10
5	Sting defeated Hiroshi Hase	Singles match	15:31
6	Masa Saito and Shinya Hashimoto defeated Dustin Rhodes and Scott Norton	Tag team match	13:57
7	The Great Muta (c - IWGP) defeated Masahiro Chono (c - NWA)	Singles match for both the IWGP Heavyweight Championship and the NWA World Heavyweight Championship	19:48
8	The Hell Raisers (Hawk Warrior and Power Warrior) (c) vs. The Steiner Brothers (Rick Steiner and Scott Steiner) ended in a double countout	Tag team match for the IWGP Tag Team Championship	14:38
9	Tatsumi Fujinami defeated Takashi Ishikawa	Singles match	11:41
10	Genichiro Tenryu defeated Riki Choshu	Singles match	18:14
(c) / – the champion(s) heading into the match
