= WCW/New Japan Supershow II =

1992 World Championship Wrestling pay-per-view event

- Promotion(s): World Championship Wrestling; New Japan Pro-Wrestling
- Date: January 4, 1992; Aired March 1992
- City: Tokyo, Japan
- Venue: Tokyo Dome
- Attendance: 50,000

Pay-per-view chronology
← Previous; Starrcade	Next → SuperBrawl II

NJPW January 4 Dome Show chronology
← Previous; First	Next → Fantastic Story

WCW/New Japan Supershow chronology
← Previous; I	Next → III

WCW/New Japan Supershow II (known as Super Warriors in Tokyo Dome in Japan) took place on January 4, 1992, from the Tokyo Dome in Tokyo, Japan. The show was the first NJPW January 4 Dome Show, something that would become an annual tradition in NJPW and would become their biggest show of the year. The show was also the second under the name WCW/New Japan Supershow. The show also aired on TV Asahi in Japan later the same day. The show was broadcast on pay-per-view (PPV) months later in America. The US PPV broadcast did not include several of the matches of the 12-match show, with only six being broadcast in America out of a total of twelve matches.

The show featured a mixture of NJPW and WCW wrestlers facing each other. The show drew 50,000 spectators for a gate of the equivalent of $3,700,000 at the exchange rate at the time. The show featured 12 matches, including two dark matches, matches held before the PPV broadcast began. Six of the twelve bouts featured wrestlers from WCW. On the show Lex Luger successfully defended his WCW World Heavyweight Championship against Masahiro Chono, while the Japanese main event saw Riki Choshu defeated Tatsumi Fujinami. The match unified the Greatest 18 Championship and the IWGP Heavyweight Championship. Japanese heavy metal band Show-Ya performed live music between matches and performed theme music for a match where The Great Muta and Sting wrestled The Steiner Brothers. The WCW main event of the show was a tag team match between The Steiner Brothers (Rick Steiner and Scott Steiner) and the team of the top face of NJPW and WCW as The Great Muta teamed up with Sting. The show also featured WCW World Heavyweight Champion Lex Luger successfully defending the championship against NJPW representative Masahiro Chono. This would be his last championship defence - and indeed wrestling match - until his title loss to Sting at Superbrawl II.

== Storylines ==
The event featured twelve professional wrestling matches and two pre-show matches that involved different wrestlers from pre-existing scripted feuds and storylines. Wrestlers portrayed villains, heroes, or less distinguishable characters in the scripted events that built tension and culminated in a wrestling match or series of matches.

Other on-screen personnel
Role:	Name:
Commentators	Jim Ross
Commentators	Tony Schiavone
Host	Eric Bischoff

== Event ==
The opening bout was a singles match between Black Cat and Hiroyoshi Yamamoto that was won by Black Cat. This was a dark match that did not air on the pay-per-view broadcast.

The second bout was a tag team match pitting Kantaro Hoshino and Kengo Kimura against Kuniaki Kobayashi and Osamu Kido. Kobayashi and Kido won the match. This was a dark match that did not air on the pay-per-view broadcast.

The third bout was a six-man tag team match pitting Akira Nogami, Jushin Thunder Liger, and Masashi Aoyagi against Hiro Saito, Norio Honaga, and Super Strong Machine. The match ended when Nogami pinned Saito following a dragon suplex.

The fourth bout was a tag team match pitting the Enforcers against Michiyoshi Ohara and Shiro Koshinaka. The match ended when Arn Anderson of the Enforcers pinned Ohara following a spinebuster.

The fifth bout was a tag team match pitting Dusty Rhodes and Dustin Rhodes against Kim Duk and Masa Saito. The match ended when Dustin Rhodes pinned Duk following a bulldog.

The sixth bout was a singles match between Scott Norton and Tony Halme that was won by Halme. This was a dark match that did not air on the pay-per-view broadcast.

The seventh bout was a singles match between Bill Kazmaier and Shinya Hashimoto that was won by Hashimoto. This was a dark match that did not air on the pay-per-view broadcast.

The eighth bout was a singles match between Big Van Vader and El Gigante. The match ended in a double disqualification after both men brawled to the arena floor. Following the match, Vader used his shoulder pad to fire steam at El Gigante.

The ninth bout was a singles match between Antonio Inoki and Hiroshi Hase that was won by Inoki. This was a dark match that did not air on the pay-per-view broadcast.

The tenth bout saw WCW World Heavyweight Champion Lex Luger defend his title against Masahiro Chono. Luger won the bout by pinfall following a double axe handle.

The eleventh bout was a title vs. title match pitting IWGP Heavyweight Champion Tatsumi Fujinami against Greatest 18 Club Champion Riki Choshu. Choshu won the match by pinfall following a lariat, becoming a double champion. This was a dark match that did not air on the pay-per-view broadcast.

The twelfth bout was a tag team match pitting The Great Muta and Sting against the Steiner Brothers. The match ended when Scott Steiner attempted to give Sting a tilt-a-whirl powerslam, only for Sting to reverse the move into a roll-up and pin Steiner.

== Results ==
No.	Results	Stipulations	Times
1^{D}	Black Cat defeated Hiroyoshi Yamamoto	Singles match	10:28
2^{D}	Osamu Kido and Kuniaki Kobayashi defeated Kengo Kimura and Kantaro Hoshino	Tag team match	11:54
3	Jushin Thunder Liger, Masashi Aoyagi, and Akira Nogami defeated Hiro Saito, Super Strong Machine, and Norio Honaga by pinfall	Six-man tag team match	15:12
4	The Enforcers (Arn Anderson and Larry Zbyszko) defeated Michiyoshi Ohara and Shiro Koshinaka by pinfall	Tag team match	12:32
5	Dusty Rhodes and Dustin Rhodes defeated Masa Saito and Kim Duk by pinfall	Tag team match	14:23
6^{D}	Tony Halme defeated Scott Norton	Singles match	08:41
7^{D}	Shinya Hashimoto defeated Bill Kazmaier	Singles match	08:37
8	Big Van Vader vs. El Gigante ended in a double disqualification	Singles match	04:49
9^{D}	Antonio Inoki defeated Hiroshi Hase	Singles match	10:09
10	Lex Luger (c) defeated Masahiro Chono by pinfall	Singles match for the WCW World Heavyweight Championship	15:09
11^{D}	Riki Choshu (G18) defeated Tatsumi Fujinami (IWGP)	Title vs. title match for the IWGP Heavyweight Championship and the Greatest 18 Club Championship	12:11
12	Sting and The Great Muta defeated The Steiner Brothers (Rick and Scott)	Tag team match	11:03
(c) / – the champion(s) heading into the match; D / – this was a dark match

== See also ==
- 1992 in professional wrestling
