= WWF/AJPW/NJPW Wrestling Summit =

Professional wrestling show

- Japanese language poster for the event
- Promotions: World Wrestling Federation; All Japan Pro Wrestling; New Japan Pro-Wrestling
- Date: April 13, 1990 (aired May 15, May 22, and May 29, 1990)
- City: Tokyo, Japan
- Venue: Tokyo Dome
- Attendance: 53.742 (officially); 43,000 (paid)

All Japan Pro Wrestling; New Japan Pro-Wrestling; World Wrestling Federation; chronology
← Previous
- Champion Carnival (AJPW)
- Super Fight in Tokyo Dome (NJPW)
- WrestleMania VI (WWF)
Next →
- Super Power Series (AJPW)
- Kokugikan Densetsu (NJPW)
- Saturday Night's Main Event XXVI (WWF)

The Wrestling Summit was a professional wrestling supercard show that was produced and scripted collaboratively between the US-based World Wrestling Federation (WWF) and the Japanese All Japan Pro Wrestling (AJPW) and New Japan Pro-Wrestling (NJPW) promotions. The joint venture show took place on April 13, 1990 in the Tokyo Dome, in Tokyo, Japan. It reportedly drew 53,742 spectators. The event was the only time the three promotions produced a joint show, although NJPW and WWF had previously worked together in the 1970s and 1980s.

The 12-match show featured inter-promotional matches with the main event being WWF representative Hulk Hogan defeating AJPW wrestler Stan Hansen. On the undercard, Ultimate Warrior successfully defended the WWF World Heavyweight Championship against Ted DiBiase and the NJPW team of Masa Saito and Shinya Hashimoto defeated Masahiro Chono and Riki Choshu to retain the IWGP Tag Team Championship. Individual matches featuring WWF wrestlers would later be available to viewers on WWF's VHS or DVD releases such as Bret Hitman Hart: The Dungeon Collection, World Tour and Hulkamania 6. The show was the 1990 Best Major Wrestling Show in the Wrestling Observer Newsletter awards.

== Production ==
=== Background ===
The World Wrestling Federation (WWF) and New Japan Pro-Wrestling (NJPW) had been working together since the 1970s, with WWF wrestlers travelling to Japan for NJPWs and NJPW wrestlers being brought to the US for WWF shows. As part of the collaboration the WWF even named NJPW booker Hisashi Shinma their figure head president in the late 1970s. In 1979 NJPW founder Antonio Inoki supposedly won the WWF World Heavyweight Championship from Bob Backlund on a show in Japan, only for the results to be reversed six days later.

As part of their partnership, NJPW was given control of the WWF World Martial Arts Heavyweight Championship upon its creation as Inoki was awarded the championship when he arrived in the United States. In 1978 the little-used WWF Junior Heavyweight Championship moved to NJPW and was defended on various NJPW shows until 1985. The WWF also briefly gave NJPW control of the WWF International Tag Team Championship in 1985 as part of their partnership.

On January 27, 1990, WWF owner Vince McMahon appeared at an All Japan Pro Wrestling (AJPW) show in Korakuen Hall in Tokyo. During the show he shook hands with AJPW owner Giant Baba, followed by an announcement that for the first time WWF, AJPW and NJPW would collaborate on a show held at the Tokyo Dome on April 13, 1990.

=== Storylines ===
The Wrestling Summit featured twelve professional wrestling matches, some with different wrestlers involved in pre-existing scripted feuds, plots and storylines. Wrestlers were portrayed as either heels (those that portray the "bad guys") or faces (the "good guy" characters) as they followed a series of tension-building events, which culminated in a wrestling match or series of matches.

The main event of the show was originally announced as WWF representative Hulk Hogan taking on one of AJPW's top wrestlers in Terry Gordy, but before the event, the match was changed for undocumented reasons with Stan Hansen taking part instead of Gordy.

At WrestleMania VI, Ultimate Warrior defeated Hulk Hogan to win the WWF World Heavyweight Championship just two weeks prior to the Wrestling Summit Show. The Tokyo Dome show would mark Warrior's first high-profile championship defense. In the same vein, Demolition (Ax and Smash) had won the WWF World Tag Team Championship at WrestleMania VI, but their championship was not on the line in the semi-main event.

NJPW had officially booked Yoshiaki Yatsu to team with Jumbo Tsuruta for the show, but due to an injury King Haku instead teamed with Tsuruta against Mr. Perfect and Rick Martel. For unrevealed reasons Jushin Thunder Liger worked the second match of the show instead of Naoki Sano.

== Event ==
The officially announced attendance for the show was 53,742, while it was later confirmed that 43,000 tickets were sold, the rest were given away for free. Highlights from the show were later shown as part of AJPW's weekly television show on Nippon TV on May 15, May 22, and May 29, 1990. The highlights excluded the first match as well as the two matches featuring only NJPW (the second and the seventh match).

In the opening match the AJPW Gaijin team of Dan Kroffat, Doug Furnas, and Joe Malenko defeated Samson Fuyuki, Tatsumi Kitahara, and Toshiaki Kawada in 11 minutes, 56 seconds by Kroffat pinning Kitahara.

In the second match of the night Jushin Thunder Liger pinned Akira Nogami for the victory at 8 minutes, 37 seconds.

Shane McMahon, using the name Shane Stevens, son of WWF owner Vince McMahon, served as the referee for the third match of the night, making the pinfall count as Jimmy Snuka pinned Masa Fuchi to take the victory for himself and Tito Santana over Fuchi and Kenta Kobashi.

In the fourth match, WWF representative Bret Hart and AJPW light heavyweight mainstay Tiger Mask wrestled to a 20-minute draw, with the time limit expiring as Tiger Mask had Hart covered for a pinfall attempt. The 20-minute match was the longest of the show.

While Big Boss Man had turned face in early 1990 he still played the role of a heel in the match by being the aggressor in the match, breaking the rules. After Jake Roberts pinned the Big Boss Man, he put his snake, Damien, on top of the Big Boss Man before leaving the ring.

In the second NJPW-exclusive match, Masa Saito and Shinya Hashimoto successfully defended the IWGP Tag Team Championship against Masahiro Chono and Riki Choshu, when Saito pinned Chono for the victory. The victory was the third time Saito and Hashimoto successfully defended their championship during their reign.

WWF wrestler Haku was introduced as "King Haku" for the match, despite not having used the name since 1989. Haku and Tsuruta won their bout against Mr. Perfect and Rick Martel in just under 11 minutes as Tsuruta pinned Martel.

For his match against Genichiro Tenryu, Randy Savage was accompanied by his manager Sensational Sherri, who would interfere in the match at one point. The end of the match was scripted out to see Savage hurt his knee, leading to a Tenryu victory.

Ultimate Warrior's WWF World Championship defense against Ted DiBiase was the shortest match of the night, as Warrior only needed 6 minutes, 11 seconds to defeat DiBiase.

In the semi-main event Demolition's (Ax and Smash) newly won WWF World Tag Team Championship was not on the line as they took on AJPW representative Giant Baba and WWF representative André the Giant. The two giants quickly defeated Demolition, with Andre pinning Smash in just under seven minutes.

The main event match between Hansen and Hogan, saw the two fight both inside and outside of the ring, ending when Hogan kicked Hansen in the face as Hansen was entering the ring.

== Aftermath ==
The April 30, 1990 show was the only time that the WWF, NJPW, and AJPW collaborated on a show, with neither AJPW nor NJPW working directly with the WWF after this, and AJPW/NJPW were rivals in Japan for years afterwards, not working together again until 2000. Shortly after the Wrestling Summit, Super World of Sports (SWS) was formed, featuring wrestlers who previously worked for NJPW or AJPW. In October 1990 SWS and the WWF began collaborating, sending WWF wrestlers to Japan for SWS shows and SWS wrestlers working select WWF shows, such as Genichiro Tenryu and Kōji Kitao working the WWF's WrestleMania VII show.

Instead of working with the WWF, NJPW opted to partner with US-based World Championship Wrestling (WCW) for a talent exchange as well as joint shows including WCW/New Japan Supershow I, II and III as well as Collision in Korea.

The storyline feud between Warrior and Dibiase extended to the fourth The Main Event prime time special, where Warrior once again successfully defended the championship against Ted DiBiase. Genichiro Tenryu's feud with Randy Savage carried through the SWS shows in 1991, with Tenryu defeating Savage at the 1991 WrestleDream in Kobe Japan. After the feud ended Tenryu and Savage teamed up to defeat Power and Glory (Hercules and Paul Roma).

Select matches from the show were later released commercially on VHS or DVD by the WWF. The Bret Hart vs. Tiger Mask was part of the Bret Hitman Hart: The Dungeon Collection DVD. Ultimate Warrior vs. Ted Dibiase was included on both the World Tour VHS and the Ultimate Warrior: the Ultimate Collection DVD. The main event of Hulk Hogan and Stan Hansen was released on the Hulkamania 6 VHS release. The WWE Network only has highlights from two of the matches, the semi-main event with Demolition vs the Giants, and the main event between Hogan and Hansen. WWE announcers Josh Mathews and Matt Striker provided English language commentary for the clips.

== Reception ==
The Wrestling Summit was voted the Best Major Wrestling Show in the 1990 Wrestling Observer Newsletter awards.

With the show taking place in the pre-internet era, there are very few reviews of the show from contemporary fans outside of the fan votes for the Wrestling Observer Neweletter awards. T.J. Hawke, reviewing the WWF (now WWE) related matches for 411 Mania on November 7, 2019, rated those matches a "7.5" out of 10 possible, remarking "Despite the lack of consistent quality on this show, I found this to be really enjoyable." as well as "not a great show, but it was really worth the time." His top-rated match was Hogan vs. Hansen at 3.5 stars out of 5.

== Results ==
No.	Results	Stipulations	Times
1^{D}	Dan Kroffat, Doug Furnas, and Joe Malenko defeated Samson Fuyuki, Tatsumi Kitahara, and Toshiaki Kawada	Six-man tag team match	11:56
2^{D}	Jushin Thunder Liger defeated Akira Nogami	Singles match	08:37
3	Jimmy Snuka and Tito Santana defeated Kenta Kobashi and Masanobu Fuchi	Tag team match	08:28
4	Bret Hart vs. Tiger Mask ended in a time limit draw	Singles match	20:00
5	The Great Kabuki defeated Greg Valentine	Singles match	07:18
6	Jake Roberts defeated Big Boss Man	Singles match	10:25
7^{D}	Masa Saito and Shinya Hashimoto (c) defeated Masahiro Chono and Riki Choshu	Tag team match for the IWGP Tag Team Championship	13:00
8	Jumbo Tsuruta and King Haku defeated Mr. Perfect and Rick Martel	Tag team match	10:53
9	Genichiro Tenryu defeated Randy Savage (with Sensational Sherri)	Singles match	10:49
10	Ultimate Warrior (c) defeated Ted DiBiase	Singles match for the WWF Championship	06:12
11	André the Giant and Giant Baba defeated Demolition (Ax and Smash)	Tag team match	06:39
12	Hulk Hogan defeated Stan Hansen	Singles match	12:30
(c) / – the champion(s) heading into the match; D / – this was a dark match
