= WCW/New Japan Supershow I =

1991 World Championship Wrestling and New Japan Pro-Wrestling pay-per-view event

- Promotion(s): World Championship Wrestling; New Japan Pro-Wrestling
- Date: March 21, 1991; Aired April 1991
- City: Tokyo, Japan
- Venue: Tokyo Dome
- Attendance: 64,500

Pay-per-view chronology
← Previous; WrestleWar	Next → SuperBrawl I

WCW/New Japan Supershow chronology
← Previous; First	Next → II

New Japan Pro Wrestling events chronology
← Previous; WWF/AJPW/NJPW Wrestling Summit	Next → Super Warriors in Tokyo Dome

WCW/New Japan Supershow I, (known as Starrcade in Tokyo Dome in Japan) was a professional wrestling pay-per-view (PPV) event that took place on March 21, 1991, in the Tokyo Dome in Tokyo, Japan. It was co-promoted by New Japan Pro-Wrestling (NJPW), who hosted the event, and the US-Based World Championship Wrestling (WCW), which supplied a number of the wrestlers on the show. The event was the inaugural WCW/New Japan Supershow. The show also aired on tape delay TV Asahi in Japan the same day along with airing on pay-per-view in April 1991.

The event was viewed by 64,500 people live in attendance in Japan and later shown in America on a PPV in April, 1991. Several of the matches on the show were not included in the PPV broadcast, held for the benefit of the crowd in attendance only.

== Storylines ==
The event featured eleven professional wrestling matches and two pre-show matches that involved different wrestlers from pre-existing scripted feuds and storylines. Wrestlers portrayed villains, heroes, or less distinguishable characters in the scripted events that built tension and culminated in a wrestling match or series of matches.

== Event ==
Other on-screen personnel
Role:	Name:
Commentator	Jim Ross
Commentator	Tony Schiavone

The opening bout was an eight-man tag team match pitting Animal Hamaguchi, Kantaro Hoshino, Kengo Kimura, and Osamu Kido against Hiro Saito, Norio Honaga, Super Strong Machine, and Tatsutoshi Goto. The team of Hamaguchi, Hoshino, Kimura, and Kido won the match. This was a dark match that did not air on the pay-per-view broadcast.

The second bout was a six-man tag team match pitting Brian Pillman, Tim Horner, and Tom Zenk of WCW against Kuniaki Kobayashi, Shiro Koshinaka, and Takayuki Iizuka of NJPW. The match ended when Koshinaka pinned Horner following a dragon suplex.

The third bout was a singles match between The Equalizer and Scott Norton. The match was won by Norton. This was a dark match that did not air on the pay-per-view broadcast.

The fourth bout was a singles matches in which IWGP Junior Heavyweight Champion Jushin Thunder Liger defended his title against Akira Nogami. Liger won the bout by pinfall following an Avalanche DDT.

The fifth bout was a tag team match pitting the Four Horsemen against Masahiro Chono and Masa Saito. The match ended when Barry Windham of the Four Horsemen pinned Saito following a lariat.

The sixth bout was a tag team match pitting WCW World Tag Team Champions the Steiner Brothers against IWGP Tag Team Champions Hiroshi Hase and Kensuke Sasaki. The Steiner Brothers won the match when Scott Steiner pinned Sasaki following a Frankensteiner, thus becoming double champions.

The seventh bout was a singles match between Big Cat Hughes and El Gigante. El Gigante won a short squash match by submission using a clawhold.

The eighth bout was a tag team match pitting Big Van Vader and Crusher Bam Bam Bigelow against Doom. Vader and Bigelow won the bout. This was a dark match that did not air on the pay-per-view broadcast.

The ninth bout was a singles match in which Greatest 18 Club Champion Riki Choshu defended his title against Tiger Jeet Singh. Choshu won the bout by pinfall. This was a dark match that did not air on the pay-per-view broadcast. Lex Luger was originally scheduled to face Choshu, but Luger's contract with WCW did not require him to wrestle in Japan.

The tenth bout was a "grudge match" between The Great Muta and Sting. The Great Muta won the bout via pinfall by spraying Sting with Green Mist and then giving him a crossbody. Following the match, Sting gave The Great Muta a Stinger Splash and then applied the Scorpion Deathlock to him.

The eleventh bout was a singles match pitting IWGP Heavyweight Champion Tatsumi Fujinami against NWA World Heavyweight Champion and WCW World Heavyweight Champion Ric Flair The match was presented very differently in the United States and in Japan. During the show it was announced that Ric Flair's NWA World Heavyweight Championship was on the line, but not the WCW World Heavyweight Championship. In the United States, those were considered the same championship and represented by one title belt. The PPV announcers stated that Fujinami's IWGP Heavyweight Championship was also on the line in the match even though no such mention was made during the introductions. The outcome of the match was also presented differently, to the Japanese crowd Fujinami defeated Flair by pinfall (counted by NJPW referee Tiger Hattori, who had replaced WCW referee Bill Alfonso after a spot in which Alfonso was knocked out) and thus won the NWA World Heavyweight Championship. The title change was ignored in the United States, with WCW claiming that Fujinami had been disqualified for throwing Ric Flair over the top rope during the time Alfonso had been knocked out and thus did not win the match.

Following the main event, a celebratory Fujinami's press conference was interrupted by Ric Flair, who stole back the NWA World Heavyweight Championship and stated Fujinami would need to come to the United States to get it back. A later rematch between the two at SuperBrawl I saw Flair regain the NWA title, but in all promotional material produced by WCW it was billed as a successful title defense against Fujinami.

== Reception ==
Dave Meltzer reviewed the event in the Wrestling Observer Newsletter after attending it live. He was largely positive, crediting it for having a great presentation for the main event championship match and praising matches such as the tag match between The Steiner Brothers and the team of Hiroshi Hase and Kensuke Sasaki, the six-man tag, the match between Jushin Liger and Akira Nogami, and the final two matches of the night. He argued the show would have been more effective for WCW if it was aired in the United States on television as a Clash of the Champions rather than as a pay-per-view.

== Aftermath ==
The ending to the main event was not well received in Japan, as the crowd was not used to "dirty" finishes like the Dusty finish used in the main event. Meltzer reprinted comments from Japanese newspapers covering the situation that contained comments like "This WCW dirty trick finish is nothing but trouble. They've already ruined their company at home with it and now they're going to ruin our wrestling with it."

Fujinami went on to face Flair again in the main event of SuperBrawl I in May of that year in a match for both the NWA and WCW World Heavyweight Championships.

== Results ==
No.	Results	Stipulations	Times
1^{D}	Animal Hamaguchi, Kengo Kimura, Osamu Kido and Kantaro Hoshino defeated Super Strong Machine, Hiro Saito, Tatsutoshi Goto and Norio Honaga	Eight-man tag team match	10:12
2	Shiro Koshinaka, Kuniaki Kobayashi, and Takayuki Iizuka defeated Tim Horner, Brian Pillman, and Tom Zenk by pinfall	Six-man tag team match	12:10
3^{D}	Scott Norton defeated The Equalizer	Singles match	02:23
4	Jushin Thunder Liger (c) defeated Akira Nogami by pinfall	Singles match for the IWGP Junior Heavyweight Championship	16:08
5	The Four Horsemen (Arn Anderson and Barry Windham) defeated Masa Saito and Masahiro Chono by pinfall	Tag team match	09:17
6	The Steiner Brothers (Rick Steiner and Scott Steiner) (WCW) defeated Hiroshi Hase and Kensuke Sasaki (IWGP) by pinfall	Tag team match for the WCW World Tag Team Championship and IWGP Tag Team Championship	9:49
7	El Gigante defeated Big Cat Hughes by submission	Singles match	02:16
8^{D}	Big Van Vader and Crusher Bam Bam Bigelow defeated Doom (Ron Simmons and Butch Reed)	Tag team match	13:17
9^{D}	Riki Choshu (c) defeated Tiger Jeet Singh via Knockout	Deathmatch for the Greatest 18 Club Championship	11:07
10	The Great Muta defeated Sting by pinfall	"Grudge match"	12:41
11	Tatsumi Fujinami (IWGP Champion) defeated Ric Flair (NWA Champion) by pinfall	Title vs title match for the NWA World Heavyweight Championship and the IWGP Heavyweight Championship	23:06
(c) / – the champion(s) heading into the match; D / – this was a dark match

== See also ==
- 1991 in professional wrestling
