= Starcade (disambiguation) =

Starcade is a video arcade game show.

Starcade may also refer to:

- Starcade (Disneyland), a video arcade attraction at Disneyland Park in Anaheim, California
- JonTron's StarCade, a Star Wars-centric spin-off of the webseries JonTron

== See also ==
- Starrcade, a professional wrestling event
- WCW/New Japan Supershow, a professional wrestling event promoted in Japan as "Starrcade"
