= Starrcade '91: Battlebowl – The Lethal Lottery =

1991 World Championship Wrestling pay-per-view event

- Promotional poster featuring Sting
- Promotion: World Championship Wrestling
- Date: December 29, 1991
- City: Norfolk, Virginia
- Venue: Norfolk Scope
- Attendance: 9,000
- Buy rate: 155,000

Pay-per-view chronology
← Previous; Halloween Havoc	Next → WCW/New Japan Supershow II

Starrcade chronology
← Previous; 1990	Next → 1992

Starrcade '91: Battlebowl – The Lethal Lottery was the ninth annual Starrcade professional wrestling pay-per-view (PPV) event. It took place on December 29, 1991, from the Norfolk Scope in Norfolk, Virginia. The event consisted of the Battlebowl battle royal and its "Lethal Lottery" tag team qualifying matches. 40 wrestlers, paired in randomly chosen tag teams, competed in qualifying matches; the winning team advanced to the 20-man double elimination Battlebowl Battle Royal to determine the winner.

This was the first Starrcade under the WCW (instead of the NWA) banner and the first to not include Ric Flair, who had left for the World Wrestling Federation. Sting won Battlebowl, and his victory led to a feud with Lex Luger over the WCW World Heavyweight Championship.

== Storylines ==
The event featured wrestlers from pre-existing scripted feuds and storylines. Wrestlers portrayed heroes or villains in scripted events that built tension and culminated in a wrestling match or series of matches.

Before Starrcade, Sting was in a feud with both Rick Rude and Lex Luger. On July 14, Lex Luger won the WCW World Heavyweight Championship, and vacated the WCW United States Heavyweight Championship because of this. Sting won a tournament to become the new WCW United States Heavyweight Champion on August 25, and this put Sting in contention for the WCW World Heavyweight Championship. Luger saw Sting as a threat, and had Abdullah the Butcher and Cactus Jack attempt to injure Sting. On October 27, Rude made his return, and he made Sting his first target. Finally, at Clash of the Champions XVII, Luger ambushed Sting, and injured his knee. This allowed Rude to win the WCW United States Heavyweight Championship from Sting later that night.

== Event ==
Other on-screen personnel
Role:	Name:
Commentator	Jim Ross
Commentator	Tony Schiavone
Referees	Mike Atkins
Referees	Randy Anderson
Referees	Nick Patrick
Presenters	Eric Bischoff
Presenters	Missy Hyatt
Battlebowl Commissioner	Magnum T. A.
Ring announcer	Gary Michael Cappetta

The first match was between the team of Michael Hayes and Tracy Smothers and the team of Marcus Bagwell and Jimmy Garvin. The match started back and forth until Smothers missed an elbow drop on Bagwell. Garvin tagged in, and performed a back body drop. Bagwell tagged in, and performed a diving crossbody. Hayes came in, and attacked Garvin and Bagwell. Hayes and Garvin argued as Smothers performed a scoop slam, and attempted a splash. Bagwell raised his knees, and pinned Smothers after a fisherman suplex to win the match.

The second match was between the team of Steve Austin and Rick Rude and the team of Van Hammer and Big Josh. Late in the match, Hammer and Josh had the advantage with Hammer performed a flying shoulder block to Austin. Rude tagged in, undetected by Hammer. After Hammer performed a back body drop to Austin, Rude performed a Rude Awakening to Hammer, and pinned him to win the match.

The third match was between the team of Larry Zbyszko and El Gigante and the team of Dustin Rhodes and Richard Morton. Late in the match, Rhodes had the advantage over Zbyszko with a corner clothesline and a hip toss. Rhodes attempted a bulldog, but Zbyszko pushed him off. Gigante tagged in, and Zbyszko gave him orders. This caused Gigante to throw Zbyszko in, and he sent Zbyszko into a double dropkick by Rhodes and Morton. Rhodes then pinned Zbyszko to win the match.

The fourth match was between the team of Diamond Dallas Page and Mike Graham and the team of Bill Kazmaier and Jushin Thunder Liger. Kazmaier had the advantage over Page with a gutwrench powerbomb. Page fought back after Kazmaier missed a diving headbutt, and applied the camel clutch. Liger tagged in, and performed a spinning heel kick to Page. Liger and Kazmaier had the advantage. After Liger performed a moonsault to Graham, Page and Kazmaier came in. Graham and Page were sent into each other, and Liger pinned Page after an aided crossbody to win the match.

The fifth match was between the team of Lex Luger and Arn Anderson (accompanied by Luger's manager Harley Race) and the team of Terrance Taylor and "Z-Man" Tom Zenk. Taylor and The Z-Man had the early advantage until Race tripped Z-Man, and Anderson performed a DDT. Luger and Anderson had the advantage over Z-Man until Taylor tagged in, and attacked Luger and Anderson. Taylor had the advantage, and performed a gutwrench powerbomb to Luger. As Taylor ran into the ropes, Anderson attacked him with his knee, and Luger pinned him after an Attitude Adjustment to win the match.

The sixth match was between the team of Ricky Steamboat and Todd Champion and the team of Cactus Jack and Buddy Lee Parker. After Parker was selected, he was attacked by Abdullah the Butcher in the locker room. The match started without Parker. After Steamboat and Jack went back and forth, Steamboat performed a suicide dive. Steamboat and Champion had the advantage until Jack fought back after an eye rake and an elbow drop from the apron. Parker crawled to the ring as Champion fought back with a scoop powerslam. Parker and Steamboat tagged in, and Steamboat performed a scoop powerslam. Steamboat then pinned Parker after a diving crossbody to win the match.

The seventh match was between the team of Sting and Abdullah the Butcher and the team of Brian Pillman and Bobby Eaton. Before the match, Abdullah attacked Sting with a stick on the entrance ramp. Pillman attacked Abdullah as Eaton attacked Sting. The match started with Sting gaining the advantage with a flying clothesline to Eaton. Abdullah attacked Sting with a pencil until Pillman dropkicked Abdullah. Sting attacked Eaton outside as Pillman performed a front powerslam and a splash to Abdullah. Sting and Eaton fought in the ring until Abdullah and Cactus Jack came in. Jack accidentally hit Abdullah with the stick, and Sting pinned Eaton after a diving crossbody to win the match. After the match, Abdullah fought with Jack.

The eighth match was between the team of Rick Steiner and The Nightstalker (replacing the injured Diamond Studd) and the team of Big Van Vader and Mr. Hughes. The match started back and forth between Vader and Steiner. Hughes tagged in, and attacked Steiner until Steiner performed a German suplex. After a shoulder block from Steiner, The Nightstalker tagged himself in. The Nightstalker performed a flying clothesline, and Vader tagged in, undetected by Steiner and The Nightstalker. Steiner performed a diving bulldog to Hughes as Vader performed a clothesline to The Nightstalker. Vader then pinned The Nightstalker after a big splash to win the match.

The ninth match was between the team of Scott Steiner and Firebreaker Chip and the team of Johnny B. Badd and Arachnaman. Steiner and Chip had the advantage with Steiner performing a sitout double underhook powerbomb to Badd. Steiner performed a tilt-a-whirl slam to Arachnaman, and Chip performed mounted punches to Badd. Arachnaman jumped off the top turnbuckle onto Steiner, but Steiner caught him, and pinned him after a belly to belly suplex to win the match.

The tenth match was between the team of Steve Armstrong and P. N. News and the team of Ron Simmons and Thomas Rich. The match began with News performing a body avalanche to Simmons. Simmons fought back with a bulldog, and Simmons and Rich had the advantage. Simmons performed a scoop powerslam to Armstrong and a front powerslam to News. Simmons then pinned Armstrong after a spinebuster to win the match.

The main event was the Battlebowl battle royal. All twenty wrestlers started in the first ring. Elimination from the first ring occurs when a wrestler is thrown over the top rope and into the second ring. Elimination from the second ring occurs when a wrestler is thrown over the top rope to the floor. This continues until one wrestler remained in the first ring, and one in the second ring. Elimination then occurs when a wrestler is thrown over the top rope to the floor. The remaining wrestler will be the winner. The wrestlers fought in the first ring, on the entrance ramp and at ringside. The final four remaining in the first ring were Sting, Rick Rude, Lex Luger and Big Van Vader. Sting and Rude exchanged punches until they eliminated each other from the first ring. Vader dominated Luger with a big splash and a body avalanche. Luger fought back, and eliminated Vader with a clothesline to become the last wrestler remaining in the first ring.

Sting, after winning the inaugural Battlebowl at Starrcade

The wrestlers remaining in the second ring continued to fight. The final four remaining in the second ring were Sting, Rude, Ricky Steamboat and Steve Austin. Sting attacked Rude as Steamboat attacked Austin. Sting sent Rude into Austin, and performed a Stinger splash to Austin. Rude accidentally eliminated Austin with a clothesline, and Steamboat eliminated Rude with a headscissors takedown. Rude then pulled Steamboat down, and Sting became the last wrestler remaining in the second ring. Rude returned and performed a Rude Awakening on Sting. Luger had the advantage over Sting with a clothesline and an inverted atomic drop. After Luger sent Sting into the guard rail, Sting fought back, sent Luger into the guard rail, and kicked him repeatedly in the midsection. Sting attempted a Stinger splash, but Luger avoided it. Sting continued to attack Luger, and performed a leg drop bulldog. Sting then eliminated Luger with a clothesline to win Battlebowl.

== Aftermath ==
As a result of winning Battlebowl, Sting was awarded a match against Lex Luger for the WCW World Heavyweight Championship at SuperBrawl II. Sting won the match and the title. Afterwards, Luger left World Championship Wrestling to join the World Bodybuilding Federation as a co-host of WBF BodyStars, a weekly television program.That was also a vehicle for Luger to eventually join the World Wrestling Federation, who owned the WBF. He would return to WCW in September 1995. Sting continued his feud with Rick Rude as well as the other members of The Dangerous Alliance. The feud ended when Sting and his allies defeated the Dangerous Alliance in a WarGames match at WrestleWar. Sting then feuded with Big Van Vader (also managed by Race) over the title, and the feud continued for over a year.

== Reception ==
J.D. Dunn of 411Mania gave the event a rating of 5.0 [Not So Good], stating, "If you're looking for good wrestling, you can look elsewhere. On the other hand, it does have some good booking as far as stirring up feuds. The problem is that you only get a sense of that if you watch the shows before and after it in succession. Call it a mild thumbs [up] in conjunction with the other shows, but an easy thumbs down if you just sit down to watch a wrestling show. Mild thumbs down."

== Home media and streaming ==
The event was released on home video in the United States and the United Kingdom by Turner Home Entertainment. The event was edited down to under two hours and four of the matches are shown in clipped form.

In 2014, the event was included on the WWE's streaming platform the WWE Network as part of its launch and remained on the service until the platform closed in 2026.

As of November 2026, the event is no longer available to stream and has not been added to any of the streaming platforms that the WWE has agreements with.

== Results ==
No.	Results	Stipulations	Times
1	Marcus Bagwell and Jimmy Garvin defeated Michael Hayes and Tracy Smothers	Lethal Lottery tag team match	12:45
2	Steve Austin and Rick Rude defeated Van Hammer and Big Josh	Lethal Lottery tag team match	12:56
3	Dustin Rhodes and Richard Morton defeated Larry Zbyszko and El Gigante (with Madusa)	Lethal Lottery tag team match	05:54
4	Bill Kazmaier and Jushin Thunder Liger defeated Diamond Dallas Page and Mike Graham	Lethal Lottery tag team match	13:08
5	Lex Luger and Arn Anderson (with Harley Race) defeated Terrance Taylor and "Z-Man" Tom Zenk	Lethal Lottery tag team match	10:25
6	Ricky Steamboat and Todd Champion defeated Cactus Jack and Buddy Lee Parker	Lethal Lottery tag team match	07:48
7	Sting and Abdullah the Butcher defeated Brian Pillman and Bobby Eaton	Lethal Lottery tag team match	05:55
8	Big Van Vader and Mr. Hughes defeated Rick Steiner and The Nightstalker	Lethal Lottery tag team match	05:05
9	Scott Steiner and Firebreaker Chip defeated Arachnaman and Johnny B. Badd	Lethal Lottery tag team match	11:16
10	Ron Simmons and Thomas Rich defeated Steve Armstrong and P. N. News	Lethal Lottery tag team match	12:01
11	Sting won by last eliminating Lex Luger	BattleBowl	25:10

== See also ==
- WCW/New Japan Supershow I
