= Greatest 18 Club Championship =

New Japan Pro-Wrestling championship (1990–1992)

Details
- Promotion: New Japan Pro-Wrestling
- Date established: September 29, 1990
- Date retired: August 16, 1992
Statistics
- First champion: Riki Choshu
- Final champion: The Great Muta
- Longest reign: Riki Choshu (538 days)
- Shortest reign: The Great Muta (<1 day)
- Oldest champion: Riki Choshu (39 years, 84 days)
- Youngest champion: The Great Muta (29 years, 237 days)

The Greatest 18 Club Championship (グレーテスト18クラブ王座, Gurētesuto Eitīn Kurabu Ōza) was a championship created and promoted by New Japan Pro-Wrestling.

== History ==
The title, represented by the old WWF World Martial Arts Heavyweight Championship belt, was established on September 29, 1990, during Antonio Inoki's career 30th anniversary as an addition to creation of the Greatest 18 Club (a hall of fame) consisting of Lou Thesz, Karl Gotch, Nick Bockwinkel, Johnny Powers, Johnny Valentine, André the Giant, Stan Hansen, Wim Ruska, Billy Robinson, Hiro Matsuda, Bob Backlund, Verne Gagne, Strong Kobayashi, Hulk Hogan, Muhammad Ali, Seiji Sakaguchi, Antonio Inoki and initially Tiger Jeet Singh later replaced by Dusty Rhodes.

Riki Choshu was the first champion, being awarded the title by Lou Thesz on February 25, 1991. He successfully defended his title against Tiger Jeet Singh at Starrcade in Tokyo Dome, Shinya Hashimoto on day 3 of Tokyo 3 Days Battle and Tatsumi Fujinami at Super Warriors in Tokyo Dome.

The Great Muta retired the championship moments after winning it, in order to focus on his IWGP Heavyweight Championship title defenses.

== Reigns ==
Key
No.	Overall reign number
Reign	Reign number for the specific champion
Days	Number of days held
Defences	Number of successful defences
N/A	Unknown information
<1	Reign lasted less than a day

No.	Champion	Championship change			Reign statistics			Notes	Ref.
No.	Champion	Date	Event	Location	Reign	Days	Defences	Notes	Ref.
New Japan Pro Wrestling (NJPW)
1	Riki Choshu	February 25, 1991	N/A	N/A	1	538	3	He was awarded the title.	
2	The Great Muta	August 16, 1992	G1 Climax Special 1992	Fukuoka, Japan	1	<1	0	This match was also for Riki Choshu's IWGP Heavyweight Championship.	
—	Deactivated	August 16, 1992	—	—	—	—	—	Muta retired the championship in order to focus on his IWGP Heavyweight Championship title defenses.	
