= Doom (professional wrestling) =

Professional wrestling tag team

Tag team
- Members: Ron Simmons/Doom #1; Butch Reed/Doom #2
- Billed heights: Simmons: 6 ft 2 in (1.88 m); Reed: 6 ft 2 in (1.88 m)
- Combined billed weight: 534 lb (242 kg)
- Debut: October 28, 1989
- Disbanded: March 21, 1991

Doom was a professional wrestling tag team composed of Ron Simmons and Butch Reed. They teamed from 1989 to 1991 in the National Wrestling Alliance (NWA) and World Championship Wrestling (WCW).

== Career ==
=== Before the masks ===
Butch Reed had signed with Jim Crockett Promotions in 1988 after leaving the World Wrestling Federation he was billed as 'Hacksaw' Butch Reed and feuded shortly with the Junkyard Dog. Simmons had been with JCP for a while teaming with Eddie Gilbert, but had not achieved much notoriety.

They first teamed together in June 1989 for WCW at two house shows, losing The Midnight Express (Bobby Eaton) and (Stan Lane).

=== Woman’s masked team ===
When Rick Steiner and Scott Steiner started to team in 1989 a female fan (Robin Green) started following them around, professing her love for the cute and dorky Rick. Steiner's brother Scott and their manager Missy Hyatt began to have suspicions after the woman suddenly changed to a new vampy look. When the woman tripped Scott in the ring, causing him and Rick to lose to champions The Fabulous Freebirds, it briefly caused dissension among the brothers. In the end, she turned on the Steiners, adopting the name Woman and vowed that the brothers would meet their "doom" at Halloween Havoc 1989, but never made it clear who or what “Doom” was.

At the night of the PPV Woman unveiled the Steiner Brothers' Doom – a couple of brawny, hard hitting masked wrestlers. Doom won their debut match against the Steiners when one of the members of Doom pinned Rick Steiner after a headbutt with an illegal object in his mask. Doom followed up on this success by defeating Eddie Gilbert and Tommy Rich at Clash of the Champions IX, looking very strong in the process. At Clash, Woman's new bodyguard Nitron debuted accompanying Doom to the ring.

Unfortunately Doom's next PPV outing did not come with the same success. Along with the Steiner Brothers, The Road Warriors, and The Samoan Swat Team they were entered in a one night, tag-team round-robin tournament, but did not score a single point ending dead last in the tournament. Doom's misfortune continued as Woman soon dropped the team to manage The Four Horsemen. Then on February 6, 1990, at Clash of the Champions X, Doom hit rock bottom when they were defeated by Rick and Scott Steiner and as a result of the stipulation were forced to unmask.

=== Unmasked ===
Freed of the masks and now under management of former referee "The Godfather" Teddy Long, Doom began to prosper. Being free to use their full move sets and not trying to hide who they were, Doom earned another shot at the Steiner Brothers.

At Capital Combat Doom shocked the world when they beat the Steiner Brothers, a team that at that point in time did not lose very often. Doom won the tag-team titles and quickly set about defending them against the former champions the Steiners as well the rest of WCW's very talented tag-team division. Doom defeated The Rock 'n' Roll Express at The Great American Bash 1990 and also mauled such teams as "Flyin' Brian" Pillman & "Z-Man" Tom Zenk and The Southern Boys. In the fall of 1990 Doom soon got their hands full with The 4 Horsemen after a backstage altercation that saw the arrogant Horsemen insult Doom by not wanting to share a dressing room with them (this of course was a storyline). Doom then turned tweener and began a feud with The Four Horsemen.

At Halloween Havoc 1990 "The Soul Brothers" Doom held on to their tag-team titles against Ric Flair and Arn Anderson despite both teams being counted out. A no rules rematch was signed for Starrcade 1990 but on the night Ric Flair was replaced by Barry Windham since Flair was slated to wrestle as The Black Scorpion in the main event. Once again the result was a “No Contest”, this time due to a double pin (Windham pinned Simmons and Reed pinned Anderson at the same time) but despite the non-definitive finish the Doom/Horsemen feud ended shortly afterwards. At Clash of the Champions XIV Doom lost a non-title match to Sting and Lex Luger in a match that foreshadowed the trouble that lay ahead for Doom.

=== Break up and beyond ===
On February 24, 1991 at WCW's 1991 WrestleWar PPV Doom took on former tag-team champions The Fabulous Freebirds and lost due to miscommunication between Reed and Simmons. After the Freebirds left the ring Reed turned on Simmons and beat him up, turning Simmons full face (and reverting Reed back to full heel) and supposedly ended the team of Doom forever. A month later, however, Reed and Simmons teamed up one more time at Starrcade '91 at Tokyo Dome, losing to the team of Bam Bam Bigelow and Big Van Vader. After the match, Reed and Simmons started brawling, causing NJPW and WCW stars to separate them, indicating Doom was no more.

Teddy Long sided with Butch Reed as the former Doom partners engaged in a short but intense feud. The feud culminated at SuperBrawl I where Ron Simmons pinned Butch Reed in a Steel cage match (referred to as a "Thunder-Doom" cage match). After the PPV, Reed left the company allowing Ron Simmons to focus on other opponents while Teddy Long turned face and started to manage other talent in WCW. Long would appear in Simmons' corner occasionally after Ron became WCW World Heavyweight Champion in August 1992.

=== Reunion ===
Doom was briefly reunited on WWE's SmackDown on a few occasions that involved Teddy Long's wedding. Both Reed and Simmons appeared at Long's bachelor party and both were ushers in the wedding. At both occasions, Doom was mentioned.

== Championships and accomplishments ==
- National Wrestling Alliance / World Championship Wrestling
  - NWA World Tag Team Championship (Mid-Atlantic version) / WCW World Tag Team Championship

- Doom won the championship while it was still named for the NWA and lost it after the name changed to WCW.

- Pro Wrestling Illustrated
  - #91 on the Best 100 Tag Teams of the PWI Years
  - First Runner Up for Most Improved Wrestler Of The Year (1990)

== See also ==
- Acolytes Protection Agency
- Nation of Domination
