= Enforcers (professional wrestling) =

Professional wrestling tag team

Tag team
- Members: Arn Anderson; Larry Zbyszko
- Billed heights: 6 ft 1 in (1.85 m) – Anderson; 5 ft 11 in (1.80 m) – Zbyszko
- Combined billed weight: 500 lb (230 kg)
- Debut: July 1991
- Disbanded: May 1992
- Years active: 1991–1992

The Enforcers were a professional wrestling tag team consisting of Arn Anderson and Larry Zbyszko who worked for World Championship Wrestling (WCW) in 1991 and 1992. Together they held the WCW World Tag Team Championship and were voted the Pro Wrestling Illustrated Tag Team of the Year in 1991.

== History ==
The Enforcers (named for Anderson's nom du guerre in The Four Horsemen) were formed when Arn Anderson and Larry Zbyszko started teaming in the summer of 1991 in WCW. Scott Steiner was injured in June and the WCW World Tag Team Championship had become vacant because the Steiner Brothers (Scott and Rick Steiner) were not able to defend the title within the 30-day window. The Enforcers were entered into the tournament for the titles and made it to the finals against Rick Steiner and Bill Kazmaier at Clash of the Champions XVI: Fall Brawl on September 5, 1991. The Enforcers were known for their dirty tactics and did not fail to deliver upon that at the Clash. They attacked Kazmaier with one of his weights during a power lifting demonstration at the beginning of the Clash. When the match came, they took advantage of his injured ribs and won the titles.

They then began a feud with Barry Windham and Dustin Rhodes and broke Windham's hand in an out of ring attack before Halloween Havoc started on October 27, 1991. Windham and Rhodes had just arrived for an interview in Windham's car and the Enforcers slammed his hand in his car door as he was getting out of the vehicle.

This injury came just before they were supposed to get their title match against the Enforcers at Clash of the Champions XVII on November 19, 1991. Nobody knew who Rhodes would get for a partner until just before the match when the returning Ricky Steamboat came out. The Enforcers lost the titles to them at the Clash.

After this Clash, The Dangerous Alliance was formed, with Anderson and Zbyszko as members. New manager Paul E. Dangerously paired Anderson with Bobby Eaton, ending the Enforcers' run as a tag team, before teaming up one last time for New Japan Pro-Wrestling's January 4 Dome Show in 1992, defeating the team of Shiro Koshinaka and Michiyoshi Ohara.

== Championships and accomplishments ==
- Pro Wrestling Illustrated
  - Tag Team of the Year (1991)
- World Championship Wrestling
  - WCW World Tag Team Championship (1 time)
  - WCW World Tag Team Championship Tournament (1991)

== See also ==
- Anderson family
- The Brain Busters
- The Dangerous Alliance
- The Minnesota Wrecking Crew
