= WCW/New Japan Supershow III =

1993 World Championship Wrestling pay-per-view event

- Promotion(s): World Championship Wrestling; New Japan Pro-Wrestling
- Date: January 4, 1993; Aired March 1993
- City: Tokyo, Japan
- Venue: Tokyo Dome
- Attendance: 63,500 (official); 53,500 (claimed)

Pay-per-view chronology
| ← Previous; Starrcade | Next → SuperBrawl III |

NJPW January 4 Dome Show chronology
| ← Previous; Super Warriors in Tokyo Dome | Next → Battlefield |

WCW/New Japan Supershow chronology
| ← Previous; II | Next → Final |

WCW/New Japan Supershow III (known as Fantastic Story in Tokyo Dome in Japan) took place on January 4, 1993, in the Tokyo Dome in Tokyo, Japan. The show would be the third and final show available on pay-per-view (PPV) in America under the name WCW/New Japan Supershow. In Japan it was promoted under the name "Fantastic Story in Tokyo Dome" and was the second annual NJPW January 4 Dome Show, NJPW's premier event of the year.

The US PPV broadcast originally advertised that they would show the eighth match of the show, an IWGP Tag Team Championship match with champions The Hell Raisers (Hawk Warrior and Power Warrior) defending the championship against WCW representatives The Steiner Brothers (Rick Steiner and Scott Steiner), but by the time the PPV was shown in the US the Steiner Brothers had informed WCW that they were leaving the company and thus the match was pulled from the show. Instead WCW chose to air the match with WAR's Koki Kitahara, Masao Orihara, and Nobukazu Hirai vs. NJPW's Akira Nogami, Takayuki Iizuka, and El Samurai. Jim Ross also left WCW for the WWF a few weeks after this show.

== Storylines ==
The event featured ten professional wrestling matches and two pre-show matches that involved different wrestlers from pre-existing scripted feuds and storylines. Wrestlers portrayed villains, heroes, or less distinguishable characters in the scripted events that built tension and culminated in a wrestling match or series of matches.

Other on-screen personnel
| Role: | Name: |
|---|---|
| Commentator | Tony Schiavone |
| Commentator | Jim Ross |

== Event ==
The opening bout was an eight-man tag team match pitting Akitoshi Saito, Great Kabuki, Masashi Aoyagi, and Shiro Koshinaka against Hiro Saito, Norio Honaga, Super Strong Machine, and Tatsutoshi Goto. The match was won by Saito, Great Kabuki, Aoyagi, and Koshinaka when Kabuki pinned Honaga following a backdrop suplex. This was a dark match that did not air on the pay-per-view broadcast.

The second bout was a singles match in which IWGP Junior Heavyweight Championship Jushin Thunder Liger defended his title against Último Dragón. The match ended when Liger pinned Dragon with a Frankensteiner, winning the title.

The third bout was a singles match between Ron Simmons and Tony Halme. The match was won by Simmons, who pinned Halme following a spinebuster.

The fourth bout was a tag team match pitting Dustin Rhodes and Scott Norton against Masa Saito and Shinya Hashimoto. The bout was won by Saito and Hashimoto when Hashimoto pinned Rhodes following an enziguiri.

The fifth bout was a title vs. title match pitting IWGP Heavyweight Champion The Great Muta against NWA World Heavyweight Champion Masahiro Chono. The match was won by The Great Muta, who pinned Chono using a pair of moonsaults.

The sixth bout was a six-man tag team match pitting Akira Nogami, El Samurai, and Takayuki Iizuka against Koki Kitahara, Masao Orihara, and Nobukazu Hirai. The match was won by Nogami, El Samurai, and Iizuka when Iizuka pinned Orihara following a powerbomb.

The seventh bout was a singles match between Hiroshi Hase and Sting. The match ended when Sting pinned Hase following a diving splash.

The eight bout was a tag team match in which IWGP Tag Team Champions the Hell Raisers defended their titles against the Steiner Brothers. The match ended in a double countout after both teams brawled to the arena floor. This was a dark match that did not air on the pay-per-view broadcast.

The ninth bout was a singles match between Takashi Ishikawa and Tatsumi Fujinami. The match was won by Fujinami, who forced Ishikawa to submit using a dragon sleeper. This was a dark match that did not air on the pay-per-view broadcast.

The main event was a singles match between Genichiro Tenryu and Riki Choshu. The match was won by Tenryu, who pinned Choshu following a pair of powerbombs. This was a dark match that did not air on the pay-per-view broadcast.

== Results ==
| No. | Results | Stipulations | Times |
|---|---|---|---|
| 1^{D} | Akitoshi Saito, Great Kabuki, Masashi Aoyagi, and Shiro Koshinaka defeated Hiro Saito, Norio Honaga, Super Strong Machine, and Tatsutoshi Goto | Eight-man tag team match | 14:20 |
| 2 | Jushin Thunder Liger defeated Último Dragón (c) | Singles match for the IWGP Junior Heavyweight Championship | 20:09 |
| 3 | Ron Simmons defeated Tony Halme | Singles match | 06:10 |
| 4 | Masa Saito and Shinya Hashimoto defeated Dustin Rhodes and Scott Norton | Tag team match | 13:57 |
| 5 | The Great Muta (c - IWGP) defeated Masahiro Chono (c - NWA) | Singles match for the IWGP and NWA World Heavyweight Championships | 19:48 |
| 6 | Akira Nogami, El Samurai, and Takayuki Iizuka defeated Koki Kitahara, Masao Orihara, and Nobukazu Hirai | Six-man tag team match | 15:11 |
| 7 | Sting defeated Hiroshi Hase | Singles match | 15:31 |
| 8^{D} | The Hell Raisers (Hawk Warrior and Power Warrior) (c) vs. The Steiner Brothers (Rick and Scott) ended in a double countout | Tag team match for the IWGP Tag Team Championship | 14:38 |
| 9^{D} | Tatsumi Fujinami defeated Takashi Ishikawa | Singles match | 11:41 |
| 10^{D} | Genichiro Tenryu defeated Riki Choshu | Singles match | 18:14 |
(c) / – the champion(s) heading into the match; D / – this was a dark match

== See also ==
- 1993 in professional wrestling
