= SuperBrawl I =

1991 World Championship Wrestling pay-per-view event

- The official poster for the show, showcasing Ric Flair and Tatsumi Fujinami
- Promotion: World Championship Wrestling
- Date: May 19, 1991
- City: St. Petersburg, Florida
- Venue: Bayfront Center
- Attendance: 6,000
- Buy rate: 150,000
- Tagline: Return from the Rising Sun

Pay-per-view chronology
← Previous; WCW/New Japan Supershow I	Next → The Great American Bash

SuperBrawl chronology
← Previous; First	Next → II

SuperBrawl was the inaugural SuperBrawl professional wrestling pay-per-view (PPV) event produced by World Championship Wrestling (WCW). The show took place on May 19, 1991 and was held at the Bayfront Center in St. Petersburg, Florida.

The main event of the show was a match between then reigning WCW World Heavyweight Champion Ric Flair and the NWA World Heavyweight Champion Tatsumi Fujinami with both world championships on the line. In the United States the match was promoted as simply being for the WCW World Heavyweight Championship, not promoting the fact that Fujinami had defeated Flair for the NWA World Heavyweight Championship in March 1991. The undercard saw Bobby Eaton win the WCW World Television Championship from Arn Anderson while The Steiner Brothers defended the WCW World Tag Team Championship. In the opening match, The Fabulous Freebirds won the vacant WCW United States Tag Team Championship. The show consisted of twelve matches, with some of the matches being edited out of the official VHS tape release of the show. The event also featured the television debut of Johnny B. Badd.

== Storylines ==
Other on-screen personnel
Role:	Name:
Commentators	Jim Ross
Commentators	Dusty Rhodes
Ring announcer	Gary Michael Cappetta
Interviewers	Tony Schiavone
Interviewers	Missy Hyatt
Referees	Mike Atkins
Referees	Randy Anderson
Referees	Nick Patrick
Referees	Bill Alfonso
Referees	Tiger Hattori

The event featured wrestlers from pre-existing scripted feuds and storylines. SuperBrawl I was the direct follow up to events that happened on the first ever WCW/New Japan Supershow that had happened on March 21, 1991. The show took place in Japan and was co-promoted by World Championship Wrestling (WCW) and their Japanese partner promotion New Japan Pro-Wrestling (NJPW). In the main event of the SuperShow, IWGP Heavyweight Champion put his title against Ric Flair who defended the NWA World Heavyweight Championship. Fujinami won the match and the NWA World Heavyweight Championship, becoming the first wrestler to hold both championships.

The match and the match outcome was presented very differently in the United States where they billed Flair as the WCW World Heavyweight Champion, not mentioning the fact that the NWA World Heavyweight Championship was considered a separate championship in Japan. WCW and the American media claimed that Flair retained the WCW World Heavyweight Championship due to Flair being thrown over the top rope near the end of the match. SuperBrawl's main event focused on Ric Flair "getting revenge" on Fujinami as he defended his WCW World Heavyweight Championship, which in Japan was billed as being for both championships, not just the WCW World Heavyweight Championship. The storyline of Flair "defending WCW and America" painted him as more of a heroic character than the villain he had been working as for over a year prior to the match, with the Florida crowd cheering for Flair during the match.

Ron Simmons and Butch Reed began working together as a tag team known simply as Doom, initially as a masked team and later unmasked under the real names. Together they held the WCW World Tag Team Championship and had several high quality, well received matches against tag teams such as The Steiner Brothers, Arn Anderson and Barry Windham and others. In early 1991, tension built between the two tag team partners as Simmons grew frustrated with the team after they lost the championship to The Fabulous Freebirds (Jimmy Garvin and Michael Hayes) on February 24, 1991. After the title loss, the two fought against each other with manager Theodore Long siding with Reed while Simmons turned into a fan favorite in the process. Due to Long helping Reed cheat during matches between the two, the SuperBrawl match had the added stipulation that Long would be locked in a small cage suspended in the air during the match.

On February 18, 1991, The Steiner Brothers (Rick Steiner and Scott Steiner) defeated The Fabulous Freebirds to win the WCW World Tag Team Championship while already holding the WCW United States Tag Team Championship. On April 6, the WCW Board of directors declared the WCW United States Tag Team Championship vacant to allow the Steiners to focus on the WCW World Tag Team Championship. WCW scheduled the two top contender teams, The Fabulous Freebirds and The Young Pistols (Steve Armstrong and Tracy Smothers) in a "Top Contenders" match for the vacant championship. At the time, The Freebirds and The Young Pistols were already engaged in a long running storyline rivalry, with the championship match being one of the highlights of the storyline.

== Home media and streaming ==
The event was released on home video in the United States and the United Kingdom by Turner Home Entertainment. The event was edited down to just under two hours and five of the originally broadcast matches were not included.

In 2014, the event was included on the WWE's streaming platform the WWE Network as part of its launch and remained on the service until the platform closed in 2026. In March 2025, WWE uploaded the event to stream freely on their WCW YouTube channel.

== Results ==
No.	Results	Stipulations	Times
1	Mighty Thor defeated El Cubano (Dark Match)	Singles match	—
2	The Fabulous Freebirds (Michael Hayes and Jimmy Garvin) defeated The Young Pistols (Tracy Smothers and Steve Armstrong)	Tag team match for the vacant WCW United States Tag Team Championship	10:19
3	Dan Spivey defeated Ricky Morton	Singles match	03:11
4	Nikita Koloff defeated Tommy Rich	Singles match	04:27
5	Dustin Rhodes defeated Terrence Taylor (with Alexandra York and Mr. Hughes)	Singles match	08:05
6	Big Josh defeated Black Bart	Singles match	03:46
7	Oz (with The Great Wizard) defeated Tim Parker	Singles match	00:26
8	Barry Windham defeated Brian Pillman	Taped fist match	06:08
9	El Gigante defeated Sid Vicious	Stretcher match	02:13
10	Ron Simmons defeated Butch Reed	Steel Cage match	09:39
11	The Steiner Brothers (Rick Steiner and Scott Steiner) (c) defeated Sting and Lex Luger	Tag team match for the WCW World Tag Team Championship	11:09
12	Bobby Eaton defeated Arn Anderson (c)	Singles match for the WCW World Television Championship	11:50
13	Ric Flair (c-WCW) defeated Tatsumi Fujinami (c-NWA)	Singles match for the NWA and WCW World Heavyweight Championships	18:39
(c) / – the champion(s) heading into the match

== Aftermath ==
SuperBrawl was the last time WCW alluded to the fact that the WCW World Heavyweight Championship and the NWA World Heavyweight Championship were separate championships until 1992 when the two championships began to be fought for separately. SuperBrawl would be Flair's last WCW main event for several years as he left the company less than two months later due to a pay dispute. At the time of his departure, he was still the champion and he took the title belt that represented the championship with him as collateral due to unpaid wages Flair felt he was owed. The match between The Steiner Brothers and Sting and Lex Luger was voted the 1991 "Match of the Year" by the readers of Pro Wrestling Illustrated. Butch Reed left WCW shortly after SuperBrawl with the steel cage match between the two effectively ending the feud between the former members of Doom. Sid Vicious' loss to El Gigante turned out to be his last match with WCW at the time, as his contract had expired and he signed a contract to work for WCW's rival, the World Wrestling Federation (WWF, now WWE). The Windham/Pillman feud continued for a couple of months, leading to Windham pinning Brian Pillman in a match on the Clash of the Champions XV: Knocksville USA show that forced Pillman to leave WCW. The storyline was that Pillman would return and wrestle as the masked Yellow Dog, frustrating Windham and other villains as they kept claiming it was Pillman under the mask. The feud between The Fabulous Freebirds and The Young Pistols continued for several months, including several title defenses. On July 14, 1991, The Young Pistols teamed up with Dustin Rhodes to defeat The Freebirds and Badstreet on the undercard of the 1991 Great American Bash show.

Bobby Eaton (after many years of tag team wrestling with the Midnight Express) won his first singles title since he won the NWA National Television Championship in 1981, and held the title for 15 days before losing to "Stunning" Steve Austin at a taping of WCW Worldwide, Austin would hold the title for nearly a year.
