= Sting and Lex Luger =

Professional wrestling tag team

Tag team
- Name(s): Sting And Lex Luger; Lex Luger And Sting
- Members: Sting; Lex Luger
- Billed heights: Sting: 6 ft 2 in (1.88 m); Lex Luger: 6 ft 5 in (1.96 m)
- Combined billed weight: 520 pounds (240 kg)
- Debut: April 22, 1988
- Disbanded: November 2002

The professional wrestling tag team of Sting and Lex Luger were best known for competing in Jim Crockett Promotions (JCP), which later became World Championship Wrestling (WCW) and World Wrestling All-Stars (WWA). The team debuted in 1988 and disbanded in 2002.

== History ==
=== Jim Crockett Promotions/World Championship Wrestling ===
Sting and Lex Luger first teamed up in April 1988 after Luger found himself without a tag team partner for the 1988 Jim Crockett, Sr. Memorial Cup Tag Team Tournament in the wake of former partner Barry Windham turning on Luger and taking Luger's old spot in The Four Horsemen and Ron Garvin's injury at the hands of The Varsity Club. They won the tournament and would periodically team up in between their careers as singles competitors. Their team was seemingly defunct after Luger turned heel in June 1989, but Sting was also the cause of Luger's face turn in February 1990, as Luger replaced Sting as the #1 contender for Ric Flair's NWA World Title while Sting was out with a knee injury. While Luger failed to win the NWA World Heavyweight Championship, he would end up winning what would eventually become WCW's primary World Title, the WCW World Heavyweight Championship on two occasions.

They teamed up again as part of the Dudes With Attitudes in World Championship Wrestling to battle The Four Horsemen in 1990. They did not form a regular team again at this point, although they would pair up occasionally, most notably to challenge The Steiner Brothers for the WCW World Tag Team Championship at SuperBrawl I. The two would feud again in 1991 when Flair left WCW for the World Wrestling Federation and Luger turned heel while winning the vacant WCW World Heavyweight Championship. Sting won the WCW World Heavyweight Championship by defeating Luger at SuperBrawl II on February 29, 1992. Luger left WCW after losing the title.

The next time they teamed was in September 1995 in WCW when Luger made a return to WCW on the first Monday Nitro. Sting was helping Hulk Hogan and "Macho Man" Randy Savage in their feud with The Four Horsemen and The Dungeon of Doom and Luger joined up. Luger bickered with Savage and Hogan, and Sting always had to keep the peace. At WCW Halloween Havoc 1995 on October 29, Luger joined Jimmy Hart and turned heel when he attacked Hogan. In spite of this, Luger continued his team with Sting and they won the WCW World Tag Team Championship on January 22, 1996, on Nitro when they defeated Harlem Heat. During their reign, Luger was a heel (and operated as such in singles competition, being managed by Jimmy Hart and holding the WCW World Television Championship simultaneously) and Sting was a face. During their reign, they feuded with Harlem Heat and the returning Road Warriors. They finally lost the titles on June 24, 1996, to Harlem Heat when The Outsiders caused a distraction at ringside, during a match, which also included The Steiner Brothers.

Their team ended in September 1996 when Luger believed that Sting joined the New World Order (nWo). In reality, it was The nWo Sting, and Sting soon turned his back on Luger. They eventually made peace when Sting saved Luger from a gang attack by the nWo. They both joined the nWo rebel faction "Wolfpac" in May 1998 when the nWo split and teamed together occasionally. However, Sting disappeared from WCW in October due to a severe knee injury and the team was dissolved after the Wolfpac rejoined with the rest of the nWo in January 1999. Luger remained a part of the reunited faction while Sting returned to feud with nWo leader Hogan and others when he returned in March 1999.

In September 1999, Luger and Sting reunited when Luger helped Sting defeat Hogan at Fall Brawl, turning Sting heel in the process. However, the team was broken up after Sting in November 1999 after Sting wanted to focus more on pursuing the WCW World title, in contrast to Luger's supposed desire for them to pursue the WCW Tag Team Titles; Luger was in fact in the same tournament for the then-vacant WCW World title. On the November 1, 1999 episode of Nitro, Luger, now known more as "The Total Package," faked a knee injury and refused to help Sting after Sting was attacked following a match the two had for the WCW Tag Team titles against Billy Kidman and Konnan. At WCW Mayhem 1999, the simmering heat between the two culminated, with their break being completed when Luger attempted to prevent Sting from advancing in the WCW world championship tournament. The two began a feud which would last until Uncensored 2000. The two later became allies again in the Millionaire's Club, but Luger was injured shortly thereafter and he and Sting went their separate ways.

=== World Wrestling All-Stars ===
In November 2002, Luger and Sting briefly teamed together in World Wrestling All-Stars until Luger turned on him, starting another feud over the WWA World Heavyweight Championship.

== Championships and accomplishments ==
- Pro Wrestling Illustrated
  - PWI ranked them # 52 of the 100 best tag teams during the "PWI Years" in 2003.
  - PWI Match of the Year (1991) - vs. the Steiner Brothers at SuperBrawl I for the WCW World Tag Team Championship
- World Championship Wrestling
  - WCW World Tag Team Championship (1 time)
  - Jim Crockett, Sr. Memorial Cup Tag Team Tournament (1988)

== See also ==
- Four Horsemen (professional wrestling)
- New World Order (professional wrestling)
- The Millionaire's Club
