= WCW/New Japan Supershow =

Professional wrestling event series

- Promotions: World Championship Wrestling; New Japan Pro-Wrestling
- First event: WCW/New Japan Supershow I
- Last event: WCW/New Japan Supershow III

WCW/New Japan Supershow was an annual professional wrestling pay-per-view (PPV) event jointly produced by World Championship Wrestling (WCW) and New Japan Pro-Wrestling (NJPW). It was held in 1991, 1992 and 1993, and was promoted as "Starrcade" in Japan, but not billed as such in the United States due to WCW already having a show called "Starrcade" held each year in December. The show would be taped in Japan and then edited and aired in North America at a later date in WCW. The final two were also the first two January 4 Dome Shows. The events are some of the few pay-per-views not made available for streaming on the WWE Network service.

== Events ==
Event	Date	City	Venue	Main events
WCW/New Japan Supershow I	March 21, 1991	Tokyo, Japan	Tokyo Dome	Ric Flair (c-NWA) vs. Tatsumi Fujinami (c-IWGP) in a Title for Title match for the NWA World Heavyweight Championship and the IWGP Heavyweight Championship
WCW/New Japan Supershow II	January 4, 1992	Tokyo, Japan	Tokyo Dome	The Steiner Brothers (Rick Steiner and Scott Steiner) vs. Sting and The Great Muta
WCW/New Japan Supershow III	January 4, 1993	Tokyo, Japan	Tokyo Dome	Sting vs. Hiroshi Hase
(c) – refers to the champion(s) heading into the match

== See also ==
- List of New Japan Pro-Wrestling pay-per-view events
- List of NWA/WCW closed-circuit events and pay-per-view events
- Collision in Korea
