= Steiner Brothers =

Professional wrestling tag team

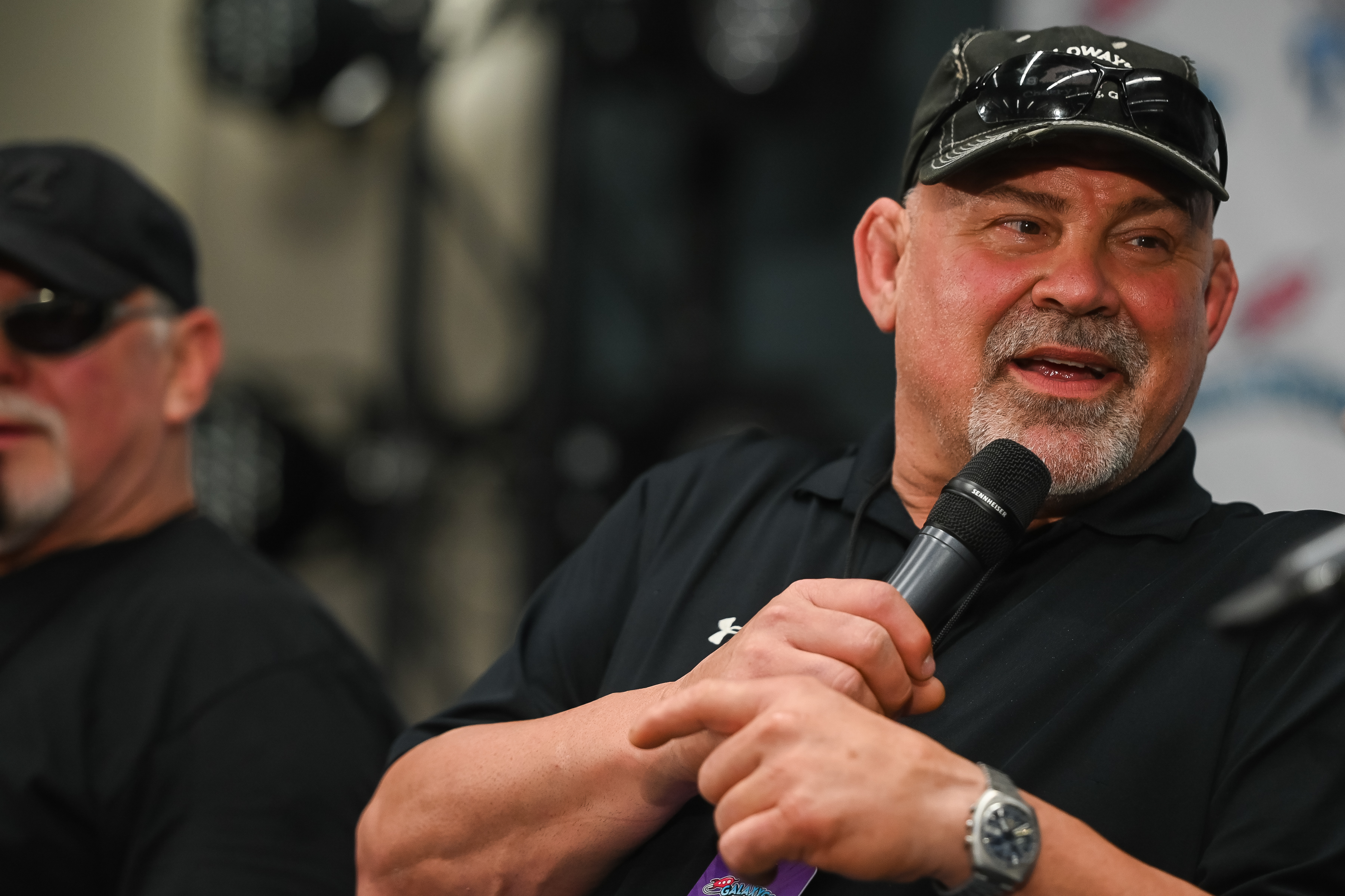
- Scott and Rick in 2021

Tag team
- Name(s): The Steiner Brothers; The Steiners
- Members: Rick Steiner; Scott Steiner
- Billed heights: Rick: 5 ft 11 in (1.80 m); Scott: 6 ft 1 in (1.85 m)
- Combined billed weight: 560 lb (250 kg)
- Hometown: Bay City, Michigan, U.S.
- Debut: 1989
- Years active: 1988–1999; 2002; 2005–2009; 2012–present

The Steiner Brothers are an American professional wrestling tag team consisting of brothers Rick Steiner (real name Robert Rechsteiner) and Scott Steiner (real name Scott Rechsteiner).

The brothers wrestled as amateurs at the University of Michigan. The team made their professional wrestling debut in 1989, and competed in promotions such as Extreme Championship Wrestling (ECW), New Japan Pro-Wrestling (NJPW), World Championship Wrestling (WCW), and the World Wrestling Federation (WWF), winning 11 world tag team championships and one United States Tag Team Championship, before disbanding in 1998.

The brothers reunited on the independent circuit in the early 2000s, and Total Nonstop Action Wrestling in May 2007. They are the first tag team to hold the WWF World Tag Team Championship, the WCW World Tag Team Championship, and the IWGP Tag Team Championship.

The Steiner Brothers are highly regarded, considered as one of the greatest tag teams in professional wrestling history. On April 1, 2022, they were inducted in the WWE Hall of Fame.

== Professional wrestling career ==
=== World Championship Wrestling (1988–1992) ===
At Starrcade '88 and Chi-Town Rumble, Scott Steiner started to accompany his brother Rick in his matches. By January 1989, they were competing as a tag team.

With Missy Hyatt in their corner, the Steiner Brothers were an up-and-coming tag team, mixing technique, power, speed, and agility. They later added Robin Green to the group. With their tremendous win–loss record, they earned a shot at the NWA World Tag Team Championship, held by The Fabulous Freebirds. On September 12, 1989, at Clash of the Champions VIII, the Steiners lost when Green tripped Scott, causing him to get DDT'd and pinned by Michael "P.S." Hayes. Green would transform into Woman, and brought a tag team called Doom to wrestle the Steiners at Halloween Havoc, in which the Steiners lost.

On November 1, 1989, in Atlanta, Georgia, the Steiners defeated the Freebirds for the NWA World Tag Team titles; the title change would air on the November 18 episode of World Championship Wrestling. They held the titles until May 19, 1990, when they were defeated by Doom in Washington, D.C. at Capital Combat.

The Steiners defeated The Midnight Express for the NWA United States Tag Team Championship on August 24, 1990, in East Rutherford, New Jersey. During their title reign, World Championship Wrestling rebranded the championships they owned and controlled, and the title was renamed the WCW United States Tag Team Championship. Upon winning the WCW World Tag Team Championship on February 18, 1991 (the title change aired on the March 9 episode of WCW Pro Wrestling), the Steiners vacated the WCW United States Tag Team Championship on February 20. They were the second team ever to hold both the WCW World and United States Tag Team titles at once. After the Steiners won the IWGP Tag Team Championship from Hiroshi Hase and Kensuke Sasaki on March 21, WCW announcers began referring to them as "Triple Crown Champions".

At the same time, Scott was being groomed as a singles performer. On WCW's weekend TBS shows (WCW Power Hour, WCW Saturday Night, and WCW Main Event). There was a special "gauntlet" match segment where a performer was picked to wrestle a top star on each show on that weekend, winning the sum of $15,000 USD (kayfabe) if they defeated all three. Scott was the second to run the gauntlet, with his second opponent being Ric Flair. Because the Four Horsemen clumsily interfered, Steiner beat Flair by pinfall. He would then get a title match against Flair at Clash of the Champions XIV: Dixie Dynamite on January 30, 1991, which ended in a time limit draw. and began teasing a heel turn when he teamed with Marcus Bagwell against Steve Austin and Brian Pillman on an October 10, 1992 episode of WCW Worldwide. During the match Bagwell was injured when he was attacked Arn Anderson and when Scott went to tag Bagwell he was unable to. An angry Scott then kicked Bagwell and slammed him into the ring where he was attacked by Austin and Pillman who then won the match. Scott would go on to win the WCW World Television Championship from Ricky Steamboat on October 17. The heel turn which Scott was undergoing was later aborted upon the Steiner Brothers leaving WCW for the World Wrestling Federation after being lowballed on their contract renewal by then-WCW head Bill Watts.

The Steiners reputedly engaged in extreme hazing behind the scenes during this time. In a 2019 interview, WCW promoter Eric Bischoff claimed that he first met the Steiners in 1992 when they were in the process of sexually assaulting a referee in a locker room, alleging they had "tortured" him.

=== World Wrestling Federation (1992–1994) ===
The Steiners left WCW in November 1992, with Scott vacating the WCW World Television Championship. They quickly signed contracts with the World Wrestling Federation, making their televised debut as babyfaces in an interview on the December 21, 1992, episode of WWF Prime Time Wrestling. During their WWF run, emphasis would be placed on their accomplishments at the University of Michigan, including using Michigan's fight song "The Victors" as their entrance music and wearing Michigan-themed ring attire. They appeared on the debut episode of Monday Night Raw on January 11, 1993. They made their WWF pay-per-view debut on January 24, 1993, at the Royal Rumble, defeating the Beverly Brothers. At WrestleMania IX on April 4, the Steiner Brothers defeated The Headshrinkers.

Following WrestleMania IX, the Steiners began feuding with Money Inc. At King of the Ring on June 13, the Steiners and The Smoking Gunns defeated The Headshrinkers and Money, Inc. The following evening, at the June 14 television taping, the Steiners defeated Money, Inc. for the WWF Tag Team Championship in Columbus, Ohio. (The Steiners were still babyfaces in the match despite Columbus being home to Michigan's archrival, Ohio State.) Money, Inc. regained the titles on June 16, at a house show in Rockford, Illinois, but lost the titles to the Steiners once again at another house show on June 19, in St. Louis, Missouri.

The Steiners successfully defended their titles against The Heavenly Bodies on August 30, at SummerSlam. On the September 13, 1993 episode of Raw in New York City, New York, the Steiners defended their titles against The Quebecers in a "Province of Quebec rules" match, wherein titles can change hands via disqualification. The match ended when the manager of The Quebecers, Johnny Polo, threw a hockey stick into the ring, which was about to be used by Jacques, however, Scott took it away and began to hit him with it as the referee turned around, thus, he disqualified the Steiner Brothers, awarding the title to The Quebecers. Scott gained a measure of revenge by defeating Pierre in a singles match the following week on Raw.

At the Survivor Series on November 24, the Steiners teamed with Lex Luger and The Undertaker as "The All-Americans". The All-Americans defeated their opponents, "The Foreign Fanatics" (Yokozuna, Crush, Ludvig Borga and Jacques), although Luger was the sole survivor.

On January 22, 1994, both Steiners entered the Royal Rumble, with Scott entering at number one. After Rick entered at number three, the brothers cooperated until being eliminated by Owen Hart and Diesel respectively. The Steiners wrestled sparingly after that and eventually left the promotion in mid-1994. Scott appeared last in a King of the Ring qualifier loss to Irwin R. Schyster at the April 13 Superstars of Wrestling taping (which included a run-in from Rick after the match), which aired on May 7. Scott would return to the company in late 2002.

=== Extreme Championship Wrestling (1995) ===
The Steiners debuted in Extreme Championship Wrestling (ECW) on July 28, 1995, in the Orange County Fairgrounds in Middletown, New York, defeating Dudley Dudley and Vampire Warrior. They next appeared with ECW in The Flagstaff on August 4, in Jim Thorpe, Pennsylvania, defeating Dudley Dudley and 2 Cold Scorpio. The Steiner Brothers made their debut in the Philadelphia, Pennsylvania, ECW Arena on August 5, at WrestlePalooza 1995, teaming with Eddie Guerrero in a loss to Scorpio, Dean Malenko and Cactus Jack. On August 25, in Jim Thorpe, they defeated Scorpio and Malenko, and they went on to defeat Scorpio and Chris Benoit the following evening. On August 28, they defeated Dudley Dudley and Dances with Dudley in the Big Apple Dinner Theater in Kennett Square, Pennsylvania.

At Gangstas' Paradise on September 16, the Steiners joined forces with Taz in a loss to The Eliminators and Jason. On September 23, in Middletown, they defeated Raven and Stevie Richards. Scott made one more appearance (teaming with Taz in a losing effort against The Eliminators on October 28, 1995) before the brothers departed from ECW.

=== World Championship Wrestling (1996–1998) ===
The Steiners re-signed with WCW in 1996. They initially feuded with the Road Warriors and had several matches with then champions Sting and Lex Luger. They would eventually win the WCW World Tag Team Championship from Harlem Heat on July 24, 1996, but Harlem Heat would regain the title just three days later and the title changes were never mentioned on TV. A short time later, Scott was sidelined with an injury and Rick had several singles matches until Scott returned to the ring the following January. Following the formation of the New World Order (nWo), the Steiners began feuding with The Outsiders, who had won the WCW World Tag Team Championship from Harlem Heat. The Steiners spent the entirety of 1997 and into 1998 feuding with the duo of Scott Hall and Kevin Nash. They also feuded with other nWo members like Vicious and Delicious and continued to have matches with Harlem Heat. On the August 4, 1997 episode of Nitro, The Steiners introduced Ted DiBiase as their new manager, who led them to two tag team championships.

The beginning of Scott's heel turn began in late 1997/early 1998 when he, now with increased muscle mass, having cut his signature mullet, and sporting a goatee, started a feud with Buff Bagwell over who had the better physique, as well as developing a short fuse with his temper. Scott and Rick began having problems teaming up, as Scott would often not tag his brother into matches. The team entered 1998 as the tag team champions, but the dissention caused them to lose the belts. It was not the end of the team's troubles, as Scott would often wrestle a whole match by himself, refuse to tag Rick when he would need to leave the ring, and would often keep the referee distracted with his own antics. On the February 2, 1998 episode of Nitro, things appeared to come to a head when Scott scored the victory in a tag team match against Nash and Bagwell by pinning Bagwell without making a tag to Rick, and Rick screamed and yelled at his brother for his actions. One week later, however, the duo won the WCW World Tag Team Championship again.

=== Separation and beyond (1998–2001) ===
The final straw came at SuperBrawl VIII on February 22, when the brothers would face The Outsiders again. Midway through the match, Rick knocked both Hall and Nash out of the ring while both attempted to attack him behind the referee's back and celebrated by running around the ring barking while Scott entered the ring to celebrate with him. Scott then attacked Rick by hitting him in the back, followed by a double underhook powerbomb. Scott then assaulted DiBiase as well, and abandoned his brother to be taken out by Hall and Nash and signified that he was joining the nWo by personally handing Hall and Nash the championship belts himself. The next night on Nitro, he adopted a new gimmick that was somewhat reminiscent of Superstar Billy Graham, dyeing his hair and goatee blond and increasing in muscle mass even further, damaging his agility.

The two brothers had a feud that also involved Scott's new partner Buff Bagwell, while Rick teamed with a variety of partners including Kenny Kaos, Lex Luger and Bagwell's mother Judy. The Steiners reunited at Slamboree in 1999, and on August 7, 2000, not so much as a tag team but they were both heels who watched each other's backs. They lost to Kevin Nash and Sting on Nitro. On the March 5, 2001 episode of Nitro, they reunited for their last WCW match as a tag team as they lost to Booker T and Diamond Dallas Page.

When WCW closed in March 2001, the two went their separate ways again. Rick would go on to wrestle for New Japan Pro-Wrestling, World Wrestling All-Stars in 2002, and Total Nonstop Action Wrestling in 2003. Later on he went to Pro Wrestling Noah in Japan between 2004 and 2005. Scott would go to World Wrestling All-Stars in late 2001 and then returned to World Wrestling Entertainment in November 2002. He was released from WWE in August 2004 and then went to the independent circuit and New Wrestling Entertainment in Italy in 2005.

=== New Japan Pro-Wrestling (2002) ===
The brothers reunited for the first time since the closing of WCW. They wrestled for New Japan Pro-Wrestling, as Rick was working full-time on the roster. They only wrestled three matches. In May 2002, they defeated Hiroshi Tanahashi and Kensuke Sasaki, with the match being refereed by Chyna. On July 19, 2002, they lost to Hiroyoshi Tenzan and Masahiro Chono. The next day, they defeated Tanahashi and Kenzo Suzuki.

=== Reunions (2005–2009) ===
The brothers reunited for the Wrestling Fan Xperince in Winnipeg, Manitoba to defeat Buff Bagwell and G-Man on December 6, 2005. On June 2, 2006, the Steiners defeated Elvis Elliot and Original Sinn at a UCW wrestling show at Bay City Western High School in Auburn, Michigan entitled "Steiner Brothers Return Home". On February 2, 2007, they went to United Wrestling Federation in Wilson, North Carolina to defeat the team of Matt Bentley and Frankie Kazarian. They also defeated Team 3D the next night in Wilmington, North Carolina. On December 9, 2006, the Steiners won the NWA Mid-Atlantic Tag Team Championship. On January 4, 2008, they returned to New Japan Pro-Wrestling, as they lost to the IWGP Tag Team Champions Giant Bernard and Travis Tomko in Tokyo. Then they defeated Bobby Eaton and Ricky Morton at MCW Mayday 2009 in Toccoa, Georgia. On December 13, 2009, they defeated Beer Money, Inc. (James Storm and Robert Roode) at PTM Supremacy in Belleville, Michigan. Afterwards the brothers went their separate ways once again. Rick continued in the independent circuit and mainly wrestled in the Mid-Atlantic area. Scott returned to the indies as well. Also, he worked in Puerto Rico, Mexico and Canada.

=== Total Nonstop Action Wrestling (2007–2008) ===
At the Total Nonstop Action Wrestling pay-per-view Sacrifice 2007, Scott Steiner teamed with Tomko in a Triple Threat Tag Team match. They lost the match and the miscommunication between Steiner and Tomko led Tomko to attack Steiner following the match. Rick Steiner made his return and fought off Tomko, thus reuniting the Steiner Brothers. They were set to face Team 3D at Slammiversary 2007 for their World Tag Team Championship. An injury to Scott's trachea in Puerto Rico, however, put the match in question, until he was replaced by longtime rival Road Warrior Animal. While Scott was out for his injury, Team 3D demanded his return and teased his near-death injury. The duo then appeared and attacked Team 3D at Victory Road, costing them their World Tag Team titles. At Hard Justice, the Steiner Brothers defeated Team 3D. On the August 16 episode of Impact!, the Steiner brothers lost in a Handicap match to Kurt Angle after interference from Team 3D, heating up their feud. At Bound for Glory the Steiner brothers defeated Team 3D in a two out of three falls tables match. The following month at Genesis, the Steiners received a tag team title shot against A.J. Styles and Tomko, but were unsuccessful. On January 29, 2008, however, Rick was released from TNA, breaking up the Steiners once again. Scott left TNA in February 2010 and returned in February 2011. He was released by TNA in March 2012.

=== Reunions (2012–present) ===
Before Scott's release from TNA, he reunited with Rick as they lost to The New Age Outlaws (B.G. James and Kip James) refereed by Mick Foley at PWS WrestleReunion IV in Los Angeles on January 28, 2012. On June 23, 2013, The Steiner Brothers defeated Homicide and Eddie Kingston at a House of Hardcore event.

On September 21, 2013, the Steiners reunited at the American Pro Wrestling Alliance defeating Viper and Bulldozer in Shinnston, West Virginia for Frontier Days. They would return to the promotion again on January 11, 2014, to face Moose and APWA World Heavyweight Champion, "The Black Superman" Onyx. The Steiners were already confirmed for three APWA shows in 2014.

On September 6, 2014, the Steiners reunited in Wichita Falls, Texas for Pure Action Championship Wrestling's Brawl In The Falls III, winning and becoming the promotion's final tag team champions. On October 20, the Steiners defeated Dynasty members Jarrod Michaels and Scotty Biggs at SSCW "Breaking the Law" in Nashville, Georgia. On November 29, 2014, The Steiner Brothers defeated the Rock 'n' Roll Express, the Faces of Fear and George South and Tom Prichard at WrestleCade.

On February 29, 2020, they teamed with a 79 year old Dory Funk Jr. to defeat Blain Rage, Jake Logan, and Shane Chung in a six-man tag team match at Funk's FC !Bang! promotion in Ocala, Florida.

== Championships and accomplishments ==
- George Tragos/Lou Thesz Professional Wrestling Hall of Fame
  - Class of 2014
- Mid-Atlantic Wrestling
  - NWA Mid-Atlantic Tag Team Championship (1 time)^{1}
- New Japan Pro-Wrestling
  - IWGP Tag Team Championship (2 times)
- Preston City Wrestling
  - PCW Tag Team Championship (1 time)
- Pro Wrestling America
  - PWA Tag Team Championship (1 time)
- Pro Wrestling Illustrated
  - PWI Match of the Year (1991) – vs. Lex Luger and Sting, SuperBrawl I, May 19
  - PWI Tag Team of the Year (1990, 1993)
  - PWI ranked them #2 of the best 100 tag teams of the "PWI Years" in 2003
- Pure Action Championship Wrestling
  - PACW Tag Team Championship (1 time)
- United Wrestling Federation
  - UWF Rock 'n' Roll Express Championship (1 time)
- World Championship Wrestling
  - WCW World Heavyweight Championship (1 time) – Scott
  - NWA/WCW World Television Championship (5 times) – Rick (3) and Scott (2)
  - NWA (Mid-Atlantic)/WCW World Tag Team Championship (7 times)
  - NWA/WCW United States Tag Team Championship (1 time)
  - Pat O'Connor Memorial Tag Team Tournament (1990)
- World Wrestling Federation/WWE
  - WWF Tag Team Championship (2 times)
  - WWE Hall of Fame (Class of 2022)
- Wrestling Observer Newsletter awards
  - Match of the Year (1991) vs. Hiroshi Hase and Kensuke Sasaki, WCW/New Japan Supershow, Tokyo, March 21
  - Tag Team of the Year (1990)

^{1}While this Mid-Atlantic promotion is an NWA affiliated promotion, operates out of the same region as the first Mid-Atlantic promotion, and has revived some of the championships it used, it isn't the same promotion. The original Mid-Atlantic promotion was once owned by Jim Crockett Jr. and was sold outright to Ted Turner in November 1988. The promotion was then renamed World Championship Wrestling.
