= Rick Steiner =

American professional wrestler (born 1961)

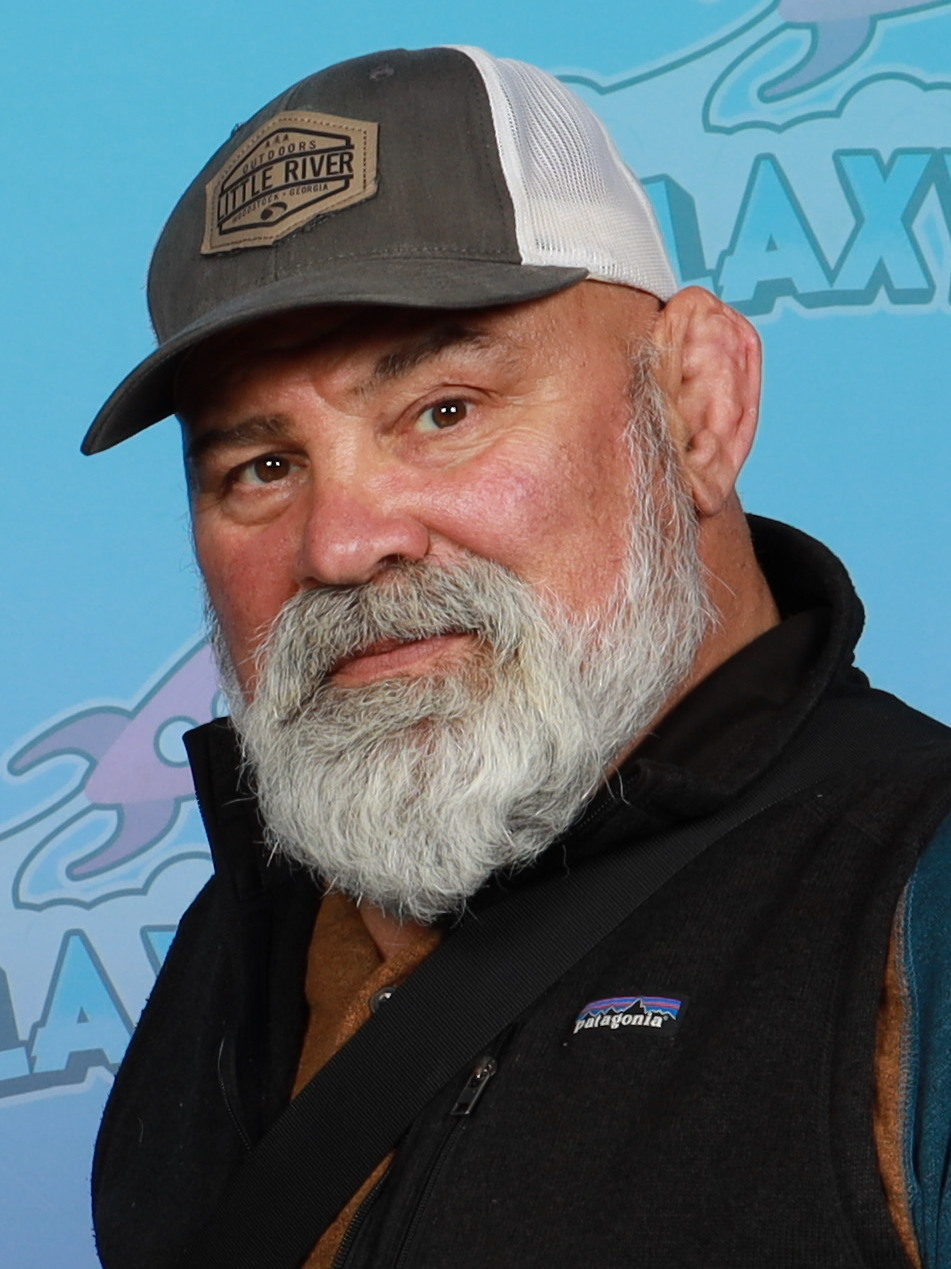
- Steiner in 2025

Personal information
- Born: Robert Rechsteiner; March 9, 1961 (age 65) Bay City, Michigan, U.S.
- Education: University of Michigan
- Children: 3, including Bron Breakker
- Family: Scott Steiner (brother)

Professional wrestling career
- Ring name: Rick Steiner
- Billed height: 5 ft 11 in (180 cm)
- Billed weight: 280 lb (127 kg)
- Billed from: Detroit, Michigan
- Trained by: Brad Rheingans; Eddie Sharkey
- Debut: 1983
- Retired: 2020

Robert Rechsteiner (born March 9, 1961) is an American retired professional wrestler and politician, better known by the ring name Rick Steiner.

Steiner is best known for his tenure with World Championship Wrestling (WCW), where he was an eight time World Tag Team Champion (seven times with his brother Scott as half of the Steiner Brothers, and once with Kenny Kaos). In addition to tag team success, he was also a one time United States Heavyweight Champion and a three time World Television Champion. Beyond WCW, Steiner found success in New Japan Pro-Wrestling, where he and Scott held the IWGP Tag Team Championship twice, and the World Wrestling Federation (now WWE), where they won the World Tag Team Championship twice.

In addition to his career as a professional wrestler, Steiner also has served as a member for the school board of Cherokee County, Georgia since 2006.

== Early life ==
Steiner was a collegiate wrestling standout at the University of Michigan, where he placed second at the Big Ten Championships in 1983 for the Wolverines, became an NCAA qualifier, and established the fastest pin record in the school's history at 15 seconds. At the 1983 NCAA tournament, Steiner wrestled against three-time All-American and future National Champion Tab Thacker of North Carolina State. After earning his bachelor's degree in education, he was introduced to professional wrestling by George "The Animal" Steele and entered pro wrestling immediately out of college.

== Professional wrestling career ==
=== Early career (1983–1988) ===
He initially wrestled under the name Rob Rechsteiner before he took on the simpler ring name Rick Steiner. He spent time in the American Wrestling Association, Montreal promotion International Wrestling, and the Universal Wrestling Federation (UWF). While in the UWF he formed a tag team with Sting, winning the UWF World Tag Team Championship in 1987. Also in 1987 he wrestled for New Japan Pro-Wrestling. The UWF was bought out by Jim Crockett Jr. in 1988, acquiring much of its roster (including Steiner), for his National Wrestling Alliance territory, Jim Crockett Promotions (JCP).

=== Varsity Club (1988–1989) ===
Steiner (right) as a member of the Varsity Club, c. 1988

Steiner was a charter member of the faction known as the Varsity Club along with Mike Rotunda and their manager Kevin Sullivan, with the long-term angle being that Rotunda was favored by Sullivan and both of them looked at Steiner as their dull-witted underling. It also started a slow fan favorite turn for Steiner, as he began breaking rules less often and was portrayed as a dim but good-hearted guy who was a villain by association only. Steiner and Rotunda were given a spot at the second ever Clash of the Champions, which took place in Miami on June 8, 1988. The duo faced Jimmy Garvin and Ronnie Garvin in a losing effort. Eventually, this would lead to a breakup and Steiner subsequently became a fan favorite before winning the WCW World Television Championship from Rotunda at Starrcade '88: True Gritt.

=== Steiner Brothers (1989–1992) ===
In early 1989, his brother Scott began accompanying him to the ring and eventually, the two formed a tag team. They proved they were a serious tag team by defeating the Freebirds for the NWA World Tag Team Championship in November 1989. The pair continued to dominate in World Championship Wrestling (WCW) (as JCP came to be known following its sale to Turner Broadcasting System), winning multiple championships and making occasional trips to New Japan Pro-Wrestling.

=== World Wrestling Federation (1992–1994) ===
The two jumped to the World Wrestling Federation (WWF), WCW's biggest competitor, in December 1992 after WCW Executive Vice President Bill Watts lowballed them on a contract extension and then gave them the option for an early release from their present contracts. They found success there as well, winning the WWF World Tag Team Championship from Money Inc. (Ted DiBiase and Irwin R. Schyster) on two occasions.

The Steiners left the WWF in 1994, with Rick stating that he felt that Vince McMahon was not following through with promises made to the team.

=== Extreme Championship Wrestling (1995) ===
After leaving the WWF, Steiner debuted in Extreme Championship Wrestling in April 1995 at Three Way Dance, substituting for Sabu in the main event.

The Steiner Brothers reunited in ECW on July 28, 1995, defeating Dudley Dudley and Vampire Warrior. A few days later on August 4, they defeated Dudley Dudley and 2 Cold Scorpio. The following day, the Steiner Brothers made their debut in the ECW Arena at Wrestlepalooza, where they teamed with Eddie Guerrero in a loss to Scorpio, Dean Malenko, and Cactus Jack. On August 25, they defeated Scorpio and Malenko and then Scorpio and Chris Benoit the following evening. On August 28, they defeated Dudley Dudley and Dances with Dudley.

At Gangstas' Paradise on September 16, 1995, they teamed with Taz in a loss to The Eliminators (John Kronus and Perry Saturn) and Jason. On September 23, they defeated Raven and Stevie Richards. Rick made his final ECW appearance on October 28, teaming with Taz in a loss to The Eliminators in a tag team match.

=== New Japan Pro-Wrestling (1991–1997, 2000) ===
Steiner made his return to New Japan Pro-Wrestling in 1991 with Scott. They won the IWGP Tag Team Championship two times. In 1995, the Steiners wrestled for NJPW full-time until going to WCW in March 1996. Rick returned later that year while under contract with WCW with Keiji Muto as a tag team. On May 3, 1997, he teamed with Scott and Muto as they lost to Masahiro Chono and The Outsiders, Kevin Nash and Scott Hall.

On January 4, 2000, Steiner defeated Randy Savage in Savage's last singles match.

=== Return to WCW (1996–2001) ===
On the March 11, 1996 episode of Nitro, the Steiner Brothers redebuted in World Championship Wrestling in a losing effort to The Road Warriors. The following week on Nitro, the Steiners picked up their first win since returning after they defeated The Public Enemy. After briefly feuding with both the Warriors and Public Enemy, the Steiners began feuding with the World Tag Team Champions Harlem Heat. On July 24 at a house show, the Steiner Brothers defeated Harlem Heat to win the World Tag Team Championship, although they re-lost the title to Harlem Heat three days later. The Steiner Brothers then reclaimed the title after defeating The Outsiders on January 25, 1997, at Souled Out. Only two days later, they were stripped of the title by Eric Bischoff. Rick then faced Kevin Nash for the title at Spring Stampede on April 6 due to Scott Hall not appearing, but was unable to win the title back.

In a shocking move during the August 4, 1997 episode of Nitro, the Steiner Brothers introduced Ted DiBiase as their new manager (DiBiase was no longer a member of the nWo and had not been seen on TV since April). After starting a winning streak, the Steiner Brothers defeated the Outsiders in a rematch for the World Tag Team Title on August 9 at Road Wild, but due to winning via disqualification, they did not win the title. On the October 13 episode of Nitro, the Steiner Brothers finally reclaimed the World Tag Team Title after defeating Hall and his substitute tag team partner Syxx. On the October 27 episode of Nitro, the Steiners successfully retained the title in their first defense against The Public Enemy. After several successful title defenses, they re-lost the title to the Outsiders on the January 12, 1998 episode of Nitro. Nearly a month later, they defeated the Outsiders for the championship on the February 9 episode of Nitro.

During a title defense against the Outsiders during SuperBrawl VIII on February 22, the Steiner Brothers disbanded when Scott turned on Rick and DiBiase, becoming a villain in the process by allowing the Outsiders to pin Rick and win the World Tag Team Championship. Scott subsequently joined the New World Order (nWo) faction and began feuding with Rick, whilst also trying to get him to join. In addition to Scott, Rick also began feuding with various members of the nWo, facing them in either singles matches or teaming with Lex Luger on occasion in tag team matches over the following months, and DiBiase remained in Rick's corner during this stretch. Rick took several months off soon after this due to shoulder surgery caused by an ambush attack from Scott and Brian Adams during the May 4 episode of Nitro.

Scott would talk trash about Rick for months until Rick finally healed and was ready to return for revenge. Upon returning from his injury, Rick was no longer accompanied by DiBiase (Rick made his return to TV during the August 3 episode of Nitro). Rick and Scott were then scheduled for a long-anticipated match at Road Wild, but the match didn't happen after Scott and Bagwell came out to claim to J. J. Dillon that Scott could not compete "due to injury". Then, after wrestling to a "no contest" against Scott at Fall Brawl on September 13, Rick teamed up with Scott's "former" ally Buff Bagwell to defeat Scott (who was a substitute for Scott Hall) and The Giant for the World Tag Team Championship at Halloween Havoc on October 25 despite Bagwell turning on Rick during the match. Immediately after the tag team match, Rick defeated Scott in a singles match (which included overcoming an ambush attack from Bagwell and Stevie Ray.

The next night on Nitro, Steiner nominated Kenny Kaos as his new tag team partner to hold the World Tag Team Championship with due to Bagwell turning against him after winning the title at Halloween Havoc the previous night. Later on in the night, Steiner and Kaos successfully retained their title against nWo members The Giant and Stevie Ray. At World War 3 on November 22, Steiner was attacked backstage by nWo Hollywood, who injured his right shoulder. Despite the attack, Rick still made his way to the ring for his scheduled match against Scott, but he clearly wasn't healthy enough to wrestle which led to the match ending in a "no contest" (Rick was further attacked by Scott and Bagwell in the ring before Goldberg ran in to make the save). This would be Steiner's last TV appearance for several months. On January 7, 1999, the titles were vacated, with a Tag Team Title tournament beginning that evening on Thunder.

On the March 1, 1999 episode of Nitro, he made his televised return as he and Goldberg defeated Scott and Bagwell. After winning several matches, Steiner became a villain and lost to Booker T in a match for Booker's World Television Championship on the April 12 episode of Nitro. On May 9 at Slamboree, Steiner defeated Booker in a rematch to win the World Television Title. After becoming a villain, Rick reunited with Scott on a few occasions and began feuding with Sting, culminating with a successful title defense at The Great American Bash on June 13. After four months as champion, he lost the title to Chris Benoit on the September 13 episode of Nitro, before reclaiming it a little over a month later at Halloween Havoc on October 24. At Mayhem, Scott Hall defeated Booker T to retain his United States Heavyweight Championship as well as win Steiner's World Television Championship, which he had to vacate due to being injured.

On December 19 at Starrcade, Steiner reformed the Varsity Club with Mike Rotunda and Kevin Sullivan to wrestle an eight-man tag team match with Jim Duggan against the Revolution, whom Duggan had been feuding with. However, the Club turned against Duggan, allowing him to be pinned. After Starrcade, Sullivan left the club as Steiner and Rotunda wrestled as a tag team throughout the rest of 1999 and into March 2000.

After taking a hiatus in late August, Rick returned on the January 15, 2001 episode of Nitro as he helped Kevin Nash fend off Scott after a World Heavyweight Championship match, turning Rick into a fan favorite again. Two days later on Thunder, he made his in-ring return with a victory over Kwee Wee. On the February 5 episode of Nitro, Steiner defeated Shane Douglas to win the United States Heavyweight Championship. Later that night, he teamed with Nash to face Scott in a handicap match, but turned on Nash and allowed Scott to pick up the victory, thus turning into a villain once more and also joining Scott's group the Magnificent Seven. After winning the U.S. Heavyweight Title, Steiner began a brief feud with Dustin Rhodes over the title, which culminated at SuperBrawl Revenge with Steiner being victorious in a title match. On March 18 at WCW's final pay-per-view, Greed, Steiner lost the U.S. Heavyweight Title to Booker T. On the final episode of Thunder on March 21, Steiner wrestled his final match for WCW in a losing effort to Hugh Morrus. WCW was bought by the World Wrestling Federation only days later and Steiner's contract was not picked up.

=== New Japan Pro-Wrestling and Pro Wrestling Noah (2002–2005, 2008) ===
Following WCW's closure, Steiner returned to the ring in February 2002; returning to New Japan Pro-Wrestling. He continued to wrestle in local venues and made several appearances, with fellow former WCW superstar Buff Bagwell, around the southeast United States and the independent circuit. In May 2002 Rick reunited with Scott, since the closing of WCW, and defeated Hiroshi Tanahashi and Kensuke Sasaki which was refereed by Chyna. In 2002, he also made an appearance in All Japan Pro Wrestling losing to Bill Goldberg. In 2003, he teamed with Scott Norton in New Japan.

Rick worked for Pro Wrestling Noah from 2004 to 2005.

On January 4, 2008, the Steiners lost to Giant Bernard and Travis Tomko for New Japan at the Tokyo Dome.

=== Reunions (2005–2006) ===
The brothers reunited for the Wrestling Fan Xperince in Winnipeg, Manitoba to defeat Buff Bagwell and G-Man on December 6, 2005. On June 2, 2006, Steiner Brothers (Rick Steiner and Scott Steiner) defeated Elvis Elliot and Original Sinn (Sinn Bodhi) at a UCW wrestling show at Bay City Western High School in Auburn, Michigan entitled "Steiner Brothers Return Home." They went to United Wrestling Federation in Wilson, North Carolina, to defeat the team of Matt Bentley and Frankie Kazarian. They also defeated Team 3D the next night in Wilmington, North Carolina. On December 9, 2006, the Steiners won the NWA Mid-Atlantic Tag Team Championship.

=== Total Nonstop Action Wrestling (2002–2003, 2006–2008) ===
He then debuted for Total Nonstop Action Wrestling during the promotion's debut show on June 19, 2002, where he participated in the 20-Man Gauntlet for the Gold match to determine a winner for the vacant NWA World Heavyweight Championship, which was ultimately won by Ken Shamrock. Steiner made a one-night return to TNA in October 2003, brawling with Jeff Jarrett. On the May 4, 2006 episode of Impact!, he returned as a possible partner for Sting at the pay-per-view Sacrifice. He made a second appearance on May 11 in a similar role.

In 2007, Rick and Scott reunited at Sacrifice after Scott and Tomko lost a World Tag Team Championship match, leading to the Steiners attacking Tomko. On the episode of Impact! following Sacrifice, the Steiners busted down the door to Jim Cornette's office and asked for Cornette to have Team 3D meet them in the ring the next week for an opportunity at the World Tag Team Title. However, the match never transpired due to Scott needing emergency surgery after damaging his trachea during a match in Puerto Rico. Scott was then replaced by Road Warrior Animal at Slammiversary, where Rick and Animal lost to Team 3D for the World Tag Team Title.

At Victory Road, he interfered in the Match of Champions by attacking the referee during Brother Devon's pinfall attempt on Kurt Angle. A month later at Hard Justice, Scott returned to the ring following his recovery and the reunited Steiners defeated Team 3D, beginning a feud with Team 3D. In retaliation to their loss, Team 3D attacked the Steiners, ending with Rick being powerbombed through a table.

The Steiners returned to TNA in late September to challenge Team 3D in a two out of three falls tables match at Bound for Glory. Team 3D won the first fall after performing the 3D on Rick through a table. However, Brother Ray would take the first loss for his team after Scott performed the frankensteiner on him through a table. The deciding fall came when Scott lifted Ray on his shoulders and Rick performed his signature diving bulldog on Ray through a table, securing the win for the Steiners. On January 29, 2008, Rick Steiner was released due to budget cuts, splitting up the brothers once again.

=== Later career (2008–2019) ===
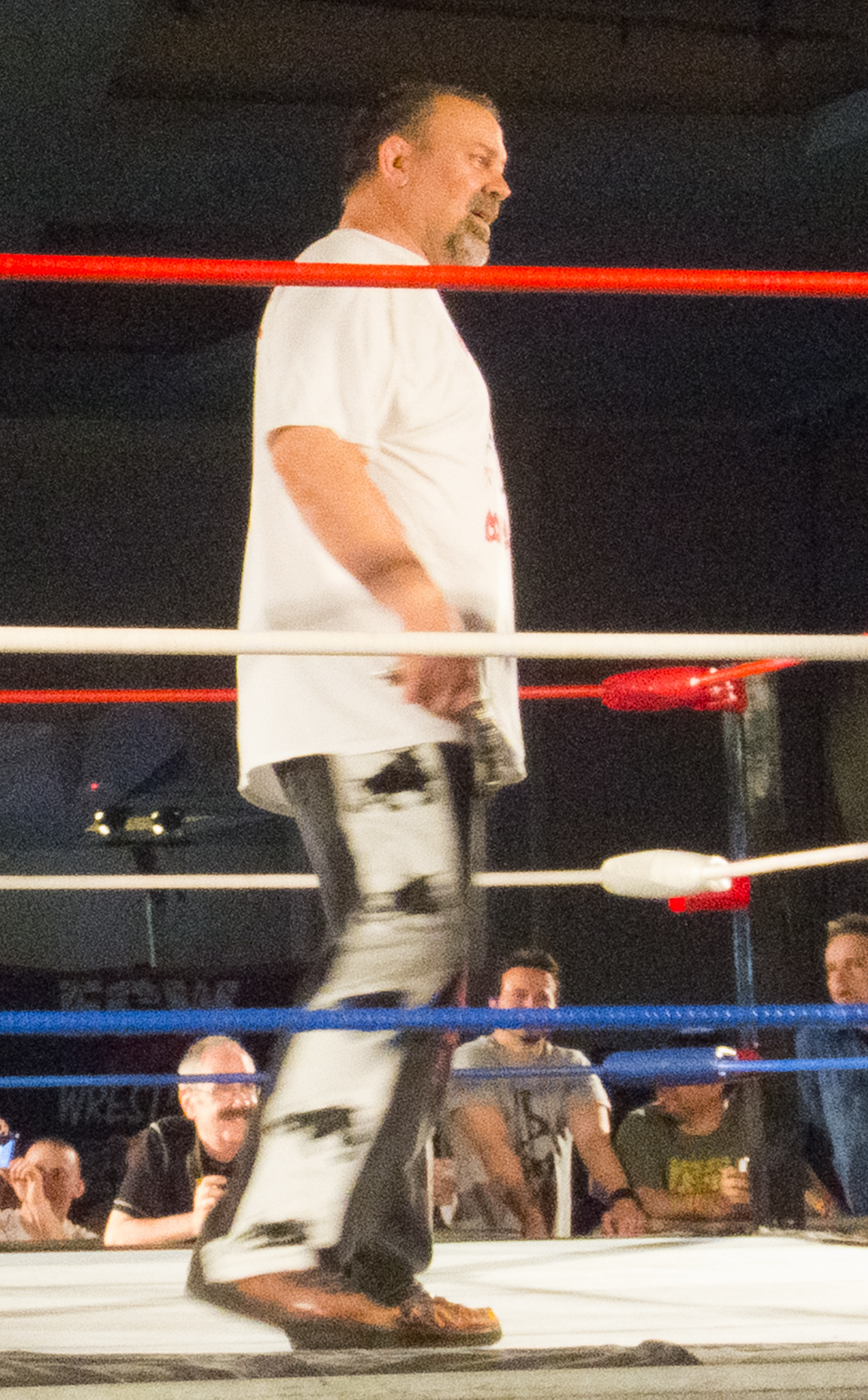
Steiner in 2012

On August 9, 2008, he lost to Bobby Eaton at Mid-Atlantic Championship Wrestling. In 2009, Rick continued teaming with Scott. Rick wrestled for Mid-Atlantic Championship Wrestling from 2010 to 2011. On May 31, 2013, the Steiner Brothers won the Preston City Wrestling Tag Team Championships before losing it the following day. On June 23, the Steiner Brothers defeated Eddie Kingston and Homicide at the House of Hardcore 2 event.

On November 5, 2016, Rick lost to GNW Canadian Heavyweight Champion Devon Nicholson for Great North Wrestling in Hawkesbury, Ontario. He made a return to Japan on September 19, 2019, for Tokyo Championship Wrestling teaming with Kazushi Miyamoto defeating Elliot Russell and Sigmon.

On February 29, 2020, the Steiner Brothers teamed with a 79-year-old Dory Funk Jr. to defeat Blain Rage, Jake Logan, and Shane Chung in a six-man tag team match at Funk's FC !Bang! promotion in Ocala, Florida. This would be Steiner's last match to date.

=== Return to WWE (2022) ===
At NXT New Year's Evil, Rick appeared in the now renamed WWE in what is his first appearance since 1994, celebrated his son, Bron Breakker's first NXT Championship win over Tommaso Ciampa. Rick and Scott Steiner were inducted into the WWE Hall of Fame on April 1, 2022. A few days later, at the end of the April 5 episode of NXT after Breakker retained the title, Rick was kidnapped by Joe Gacy and Harland, locked up and tied inside a cage.

== Personal life ==
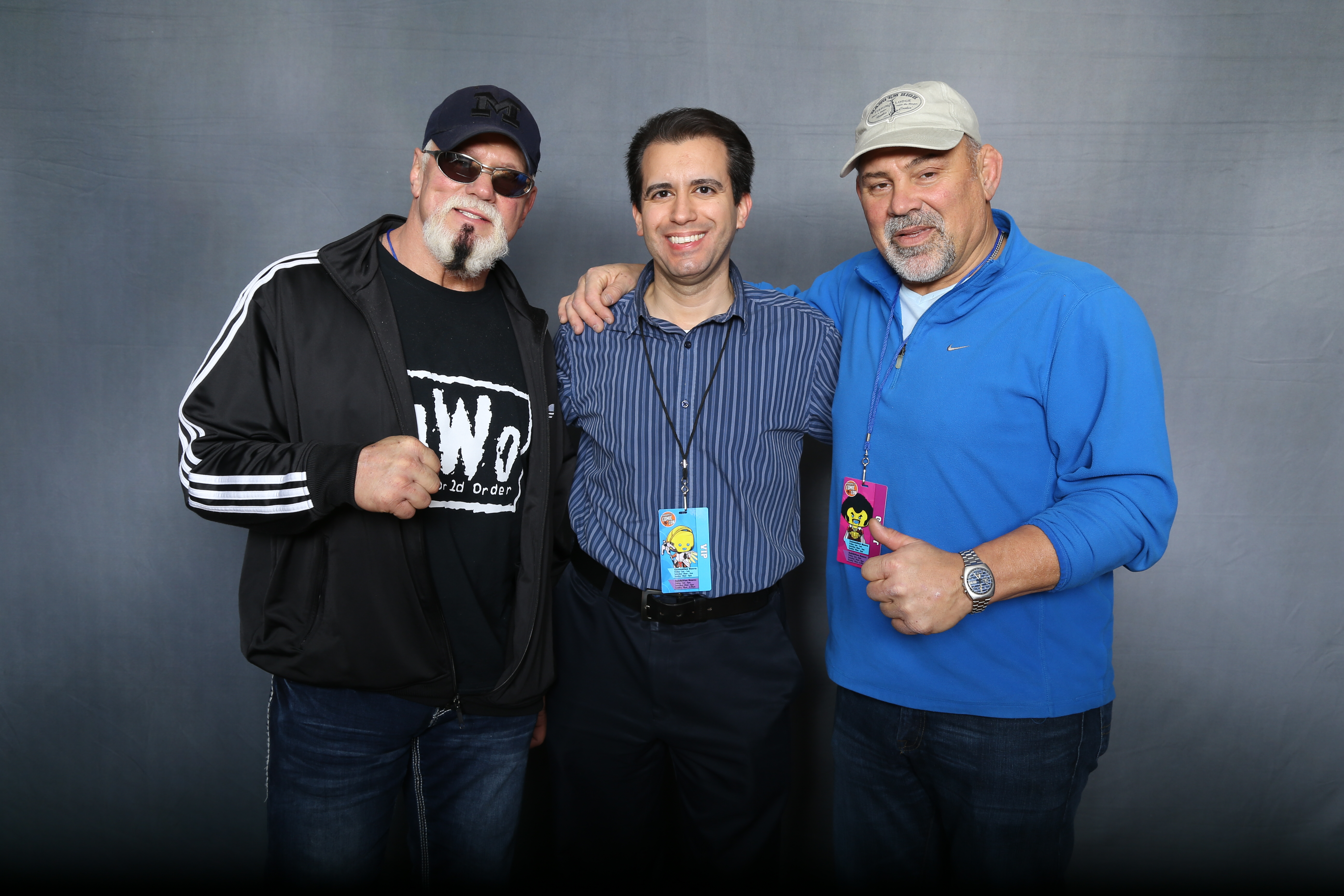
Steiner worked for several years with his brother Scott. In the picture, Scott (left) and Rick (right) in 2018 posing with a fan.

Steiner has three sons: Hudson, Maveric, and Bronson. In 2020, Bronson signed with the National Football League's Baltimore Ravens as an undrafted rookie, and in 2021, signed a professional wrestling contract with WWE and currently performs on the Raw brand under the ring name Bron Breakker.

In mid-2004, Steiner began selling real estate. He is currently with Rick Steiner and Associates at Atlanta Communities Real Estate Brokerage in the North Metro Atlanta area.

He is also a school board member of the Cherokee County School District. He was disqualified from entering the Republican primary for the 2006 term, due to using the Steiner name rather than his legal name. Steiner could have re-run for Republican party nomination had he presented a petition calling for this with 4,500 signatures; however, he was unable to do so. Consequently, Steiner ran unopposed as a write-in candidate in November 2006 and won the seat on the board for District 4. As of January 2025, he is still an elected member of the board, representing the county's District 4. His current term of office ends in 2026.

On March 31, 2023, Impact wrestler Gisele Shaw accused Steiner in a tweet of yelling transphobic comments directed at her and a homophobic slur at one of her peers at WrestleCon. Professional wrestling referee Daniel Spencer and Impact wrestler Gia Miller both stated on Twitter that they witnessed the incident, voicing their support for Shaw. On April 1, WrestleCon organizers subsequently banned Steiner from the rest of convention's events for 2023. WrestleCon founder Michael Bochicchio claimed in a July 2023 statement that Steiner had apologized to convention staff and other wrestlers in a "private mediated event" which Shaw chose not to attend, but added that Steiner "will forever be on a zero-tolerance scale moving forward at any of our events."

== Championships and accomplishments ==
- George Tragos/Lou Thesz Professional Wrestling Hall of Fame
  - Class of 2014
- Jim Crockett Promotions/World Championship Wrestling
  - NWA Florida Heavyweight Championship (1 time) (Note: Although it was almost always defended in Florida, the NWA Florida Heavyweight Championship was given to Steiner by Mike Rotunda while working a storyline together in Jim Crockett Promotions in December 1987. Steiner was stripped of the championship so that it could be defended in the Florida promotion exclusively once again in December 1988.)
  - NWA/WCW World Television Championship (3 times)
  - WCW United States Heavyweight Championship (1 time)
  - NWA/WCW United States Tag Team Championship (2 times) – with Eddie Gilbert (1) and Scott Steiner (1) (Note: Steiner's reigns with this championship occurred after Ted Turner purchased Mid-Atlantic Championship Wrestling from Jim Crockett Jr. in November 1988 and renamed the promotion World Championship Wrestling. The reigns also occurred prior to the title being renamed the WCW United States Tag Team Championship and while WCW was still an NWA affiliated promotion.)
  - NWA/WCW World Tag Team Championships (8 times) – with Scott Steiner (7) and Kenny Kaos/Judy Bagwell (1) (Note: After Buff Bagwell abandoned Steiner during the championship match, Steiner chose Kenny Kaos as a replacement partner to hold the championship with. After Kaos suffered an injury, Steiner chose Bagwell's mother Judy as a replacement partner to hold the championship with. WWE recognizes this occurrence as one continuous reign for Steiner.)
  - Pat O'Connor Memorial Tag Team Tournament (1990) (Note: The Steiner Brothers won the tournament in 1990 when Mid-Atlantic Championship Wrestling was bought by Ted Turner and renamed World Championship Wrestling, but prior to WCW's withdrawal from the National Wrestling Alliance.) – with Scott Steiner
- Mid-Atlantic Championship Wrestling (Note: This Mid-Atlantic Championship Wrestling, while currently operating out of the same region of the United States and having revised some of the championships used by the original Mid-Atlantic Championship Wrestling, is not the same promotion that was once owned by Jim Crockett Jr. and subsequently sold to Ted Turner in 1988. It is just another NWA-affiliated promotion.)
  - NWA Mid-Atlantic Tag Team Championship (2 times) – with Terry Taylor (1) and Scott Steiner (1)
- New Japan Pro-Wrestling
  - IWGP Heavyweight Tag Team Championship (2 times) – with Scott Steiner
- Preston City Wrestling
  - PCW Tag Team Championship (1 time) – with Scott Steiner
- Pro Wrestling America
  - PWA Tag Team Championship (1 time) – with Scott Steiner
- Pro Wrestling Illustrated
  - PWI Match of the Year (1991) with Scott Steiner vs. Lex Luger and Sting at SuperBrawl I
  - PWI Tag Team of the Year (1990, 1993) with Scott Steiner
  - PWI ranked him #2 of the Top 100 Tag Teams of the "PWI Years" with Scott Steiner in 2003
  - PWI ranked him #10 of the top 500 singles wrestlers in the PWI 500 in 1991
  - PWI ranked him #88 of the top 500 singles wrestlers of the "PWI Years" in 2003
- Pro Wrestling This Week
  - Wrestler of the Week (May 2, 1987) with Sting
- Pure Action Championship Wrestling
  - PACW Tag Team Championship (1 time) - with Scott Steiner
- Southern Championship Wrestling
  - SCW Championship (1 time)
- United Wrestling Federation
  - Rock 'n' Roll Express Tag Team Tournament - with Scott Steiner (2007)
- Universal Wrestling Federation
  - UWF World Tag Team Championship (1 time) – with Sting
- World League Wrestling
  - WLW Heavyweight Championship (2 times)
- World Pro Wrestling
  - WPW Heavyweight Championship (1 time)
- World Wrestling Federation/WWE
  - WWF Tag Team Championship (2 times) – with Scott Steiner
  - WWE Hall of Fame (Class of 2022) - as a member of The Steiner Brothers
- Wrestling Observer Newsletter
  - Tag Team of the Year (1990) with Scott Steiner
  - Most Improved (1986)
  - Best Gimmick (1988)
  - Match of the Year (1991) with Scott Steiner vs. Hiroshi Hase and Kensuke Sasaki at WCW/New Japan Supershow
