= SuperBrawl VIII =

1998 World Championship Wrestling pay-per-view event

- VHS cover featuring Hollywood Hogan and Sting
- Promotion: World Championship Wrestling
- Brand(s): WCW nWo
- Date: February 22, 1998
- City: Daly City, California
- Venue: Cow Palace
- Attendance: 12,620
- Buy rate: 415,000
- Tagline: "Hogan vs. Sting II for Championship"

Pay-per-view chronology
← Previous; Souled Out	Next → Uncensored

SuperBrawl chronology
← Previous; VII	Next → IX

SuperBrawl VIII was the eighth SuperBrawl professional wrestling pay-per-view (PPV) event produced by World Championship Wrestling (WCW). The event took place on February 22, 1998, from the Cow Palace in San Francisco, California.

Eleven matches were contested at the event, including one dark match. The main event saw Sting defeat Hollywood Hogan to win the vacant WCW World Heavyweight Championship. In other prominent matches, The Outsiders (Scott Hall and Kevin Nash) defeated The Steiner Brothers (Rick Steiner and Scott Steiner) to win the WCW World Tag Team Championship, Chris Jericho retained his WCW Cruiserweight Championship against Juventud Guerrera in a Title vs. Mask match, and Booker T defeated Rick Martel to win the WCW World Television Championship and successfully defended it in a subsequent match against Saturn.

The event generated 415,000 ppv buys.

== Storylines ==
The event featured wrestlers from pre-existing scripted feuds and storylines. Wrestlers portrayed villains, heroes, or less distinguishable characters in the scripted events that built tension and culminated in a wrestling match or series of matches.

The central storyline entering SuperBrawl was the ongoing dispute over the WCW World Heavyweight Championship. At Starrcade in December 1997, Hollywood Hogan and Sting squared off in the main event for the title, which at the time belonged to Hogan. Hogan was initially awarded the victory, but the decision was reversed by Bret Hart, who claimed referee Nick Patrick had made a fast count and restarted the match, which Sting won by submission. Due to the circumstances surrounding the match, a rematch was ordered for the December 29, 1997 edition of WCW Monday Nitro. That match also ended with no clear result, leaving WCW with the decision to vacate the championship. That was announced on January 8, 1998, during the premiere of WCW Thunder.

Meanwhile, by virtue of his win in the three ring battle royal at World War 3 in November of 1997, Scott Hall was next in line for a world title match. Per the stipulations of the battle royal, Hall was supposed to receive his match at SuperBrawl. With no championship for him to contend for, however, he too was in need of a resolution and all three men would get it at Souled Out on January 24, with interim commissioner Roddy Piper declaring that Hogan and Sting would face off for the vacant championship at SuperBrawl. Hall would receive his shot instead at Uncensored in March.

=== Canceled match ===
Louie Spicolli, who had been portrayed as the underling of Scott Hall, was originally scheduled to have a match with Larry Zbyszko on the show. However, one week before the pay-per-view, Spicolli died at the age of 27 due to complications with drug and alcohol abuse.

== Event ==
Other on-screen personnel
Role:	Name:
Commentators	Tony Schiavone
Commentators	Bobby Heenan
Commentators	Mike Tenay
Interviewer	Gene Okerlund
Ring announcers	Michael Buffer
Ring announcers	David Penzer
Referees	Randy Anderson
Referees	Mickie Henson
Referees	Charles Robinson
Referees	Nick Patrick
Referees	Billy Silverman

Due to Spicolli's death, the match with Zbyszko was scrapped. In its place, a match pitting Brad Armstrong against Goldberg was added to the card.

Rick Martel was initially booked to win the match against Booker T. However, he suffered a torn knee ligament after hitting his leg on the ropes after a hip toss from Booker T. The winner of the match was to defend the title against Saturn immediately. Due to Martel's injury and the reworking of the finish, Saturn and Booker were forced to improvise the entire match.

The Chris Jericho vs. Juventud Guerrera match was initially called a win for Guerrera on a pinfall after a Juvi 450 Splash, but the referee belatedly saw Jericho reach the ropes and ordered the match to continue. After a few more minutes, Jericho forced the submission, and when Guerrera's unmasking of himself took a little too long for Jericho's liking, he ripped off the mask for him.

Steve McMichael suffered a broken arm during his match against The British Bulldog.

Lex Luger forced Randy Savage to submit with the Torture Rack. Elizabeth interfered while Luger first put Savage in the Torture Rack and pulled him down. Immediately after that, Scott Norton, Buff Bagwell, Brian Adams, and Vincent rushed the ring and began attacking Luger and Savage. Hollywood Hogan then came out and called all four members of the nWo back to the locker room, thus leaving Savage alone in the ring, where he suffered the Torture Rack and lost the match.

Scott Hall pinned Rick Steiner after an Outsider's Edge. Scott Steiner turned on Rick midway through the match and refused to help him fight off The Outsiders. After the match Scott handed the tag team title belts to the Outsiders and joined the New World Order.

In the main event, Sting pinned Hollywood Hogan after a Scorpion Death drop. While Sting hit the move, Hogan kicked referee Nick Patrick and knocked him down. While the referee was down, Scott Norton, Buff Bagwell, Brian Adams, Vincent, Konnan, and Randy Savage came to the ring. Everyone except Savage went to attack Sting. As Hogan was trying to get up, Savage struck him with a spray can and left the ring. Sting scored the pin and won the match.

== Reception ==
In 2012, Jack Bramma of 411Mania gave the event a rating of 7.0 [Good], stating, "Really solid PPV until the prime time players show up in the last hour to bathe in the tears of small children with two swerves, several run-ins, and no clean finishes in the final three marquee matches. Watch the first 2/3 for work and the final 1/3 for personality."

== Results ==
No.	Results	Stipulations	Times
1^{D}	Último Dragón defeated Shiryu (with Sonny Onoo)	Singles match	—
2	Booker T defeated Rick Martel (c)	Singles match for the WCW World Television Championship	10:33
3	Booker T (c) defeated Saturn	Singles match for the WCW World Television Championship	14:23
4	Disco Inferno defeated La Parka	Singles match	11:41
5	Goldberg defeated Brad Armstrong	Singles match	02:23
6	Chris Jericho (c) defeated Juventud Guerrera	Title vs. Mask match for the WCW Cruiserweight Championship	13:29
7	The British Bulldog defeated Steve McMichael	Singles match	06:10
8	Diamond Dallas Page (c) defeated Chris Benoit	Singles match for the WCW United States Heavyweight Championship	15:47
9	Lex Luger defeated Randy Savage (with Miss Elizabeth)	No Disqualification match	07:26
10	The Outsiders (Scott Hall and Kevin Nash) (with Dusty Rhodes) defeated The Steiner Brothers (Rick Steiner and Scott Steiner) (c) (with Ted DiBiase)	Tag team match for the WCW World Tag Team Championship	04:18
11	Sting defeated Hollywood Hogan	Singles match for the vacant WCW World Heavyweight Championship	16:33
(c) / – the champion(s) heading into the match; D / – this was a dark match
