= SuperBrawl IX =

1999 World Championship Wrestling pay-per-view event

- Promotional poster featuring the WCW World Heavyweight Championship
- Promotion: World Championship Wrestling
- Brand(s): WCW nWo
- Date: February 21, 1999
- City: Oakland, California
- Venue: Oakland Arena
- Attendance: 15,880
- Buy rate: 485,000
- Tagline(s): He Who Wins The Belt Has The Power. World Heavyweight Title!

Pay-per-view chronology
← Previous; Souled Out	Next → Uncensored

SuperBrawl chronology
← Previous; VIII	Next → 2000

SuperBrawl IX was the ninth SuperBrawl professional wrestling pay-per-view (PPV) event produced by World Championship Wrestling (WCW). The event took place on February 21, 1999 from the Oakland Arena in Oakland, California.

Ten matches were contested at the event. In the main event, Hollywood Hogan retained his WCW World Heavyweight Championship against Ric Flair. In other prominent matches, Goldberg defeated Bam Bam Bigelow, Scott Hall defeated Roddy Piper to win the WCW United States Heavyweight Championship, The Outsiders (Hall and Kevin Nash) defeated Konnan and Rey Misterio Jr. in a Hair vs. Mask match, and Curt Henning and Barry Windham defeated The Four Horsemen (Chris Benoit and Dean Malenko) in a sudden death tournament final for the vacant WCW World Tag Team Championship.

== Storylines ==
The event featured wrestlers from pre-existing scripted feuds and storylines. Wrestlers portrayed villains, heroes, or less distinguishable characters in the scripted events that built tension and culminated in a wrestling match or series of matches.

== Event ==
Other on-screen personnel
Role:	Name:
Commentators	Tony Schiavone
Commentators	Bobby Heenan
Commentators	Mike Tenay
Interviewer	Gene Okerlund
Ring announcers	David Penzer
Ring announcers	Michael Buffer
Referees	Randy Anderson
Referees	Johnny Boone
Referees	Scott Dickinson
Referees	Mickie Jay
Referees	Charles Robinson
Referees	Billy Silverman

The match of Barry Windham and Curt Hennig against Chris Benoit and Dean Malenko was the final of a double-elimination tournament. Entering the match, Benoit and Malenko had already lost once while Windham and Hennig were undefeated. Malenko forced Windham to submit with the Texas Cloverleaf for the first fall. Windham pinned Malenko for the second fall and the Tag Team Championships after choking Malenko out with his belt.

Kevin Nash pinned Rey Misterio, Jr. after an Outsider's Edge from Scott Hall. As a result of the match, Misterio was forced to unmask; had Konnan and Misterio won, Miss Elizabeth would have been shaved bald. This match was originally supposed to involve Lex Luger as Kevin Nash's tag team partner, but Luger suffered a bicep injury at the hands of Misterio three days earlier on Thunder and was immediately replaced by Scott Hall.

Hollywood Hogan pinned Ric Flair after David Flair turned heel and used a Stun Gun on his own father, joining the nWo Elite in the process.

== Reception ==
In 2007, Arnold Furious of 411Mania gave the event a rating of 5.0 [Not So Good], stating, "The undercard was ok but the main events dragged it down and there’s nothing SO amazing on the undercard to go and check it out for. This show got really positive reviews at the time but I think that was entirely down to it not being shit. The tale end of 1998 set the standard of PPV so LOW for WCW that generally people didn’t expect anything when they ordered a WCW show. When they got something they ended up being really happy about it. But if you look at the booking they totally fucked the fans over. They knew Flair was losing and still jobbed out Benoit & Malenko, Rey Jr, DDP and put the US title on Scott Hall. Yeah, Goldberg went over but if he’d have lost then WCW would have had to be completely gaga. Thumbs in the middle for this one but no real recommendation to check it out." The event generated 485,000 buys.

== Results ==
No.	Results	Stipulations	Times
1	Booker T defeated Disco Inferno	Singles match	09:19
2	Chris Jericho (with Ralphus) defeated Perry Saturn by count out	Singles match	11:17
3	Billy Kidman (c) defeated Chavo Guerrero Jr.	Singles match for the WCW Cruiserweight Championship	08:26
4	Chris Benoit and Dean Malenko defeated Curt Hennig and Barry Windham	Tag team match	20:00
5	Curt Hennig and Barry Windham defeated Chris Benoit and Dean Malenko	Tag team match for the vacant WCW World Tag Team Championship	0:37
6	The Outsiders (Kevin Nash and Scott Hall) (with Lex Luger and Miss Elizabeth) defeated Konnan and Rey Misterio Jr.	Hair vs. Mask match	11:00
7	Scott Steiner (c) defeated Diamond Dallas Page	Singles match for the WCW World Television Championship	13:54
8	Scott Hall (with Disco Inferno) defeated Roddy Piper (c)	Singles match for the WCW United States Heavyweight Championship	08:21
9	Goldberg defeated Bam Bam Bigelow	Singles match	11:39
10	Hollywood Hogan (c) defeated Ric Flair	Singles match for the WCW World Heavyweight Championship	12:01
(c) / – the champion(s) heading into the match

=== WCW World Tag Team Championship Tournament ===
After Rick Steiner was injured, the titles were vacated and the tournament was held originally as a single-elimination tournament that began with Dave Taylor and Fit Finlay defeating Lizmark Jr. and Super Caló on the January 7, 1999 episode of Thunder. It was changed to a double-elimination tournament, where a team would have to lose 2 matches in order to be eliminated, due to the constant interference of the nWo, who did not want the tournament to happen.

First Round (Nitro/Thunder)	Quarter-Finals (Thunder)	Semifinals (Nitro)	Finals (Superbrawl IX)	Sudden Death (Superbrawl IX)
1/21/99
nWo Black & White (Brian Adams and Horace Hogan)	Pin
2/4/99
Billy Kidman and Chavo Guerrero Jr.
nWo Black & White	Pin
1/25/99
The Faces of Fear
The Faces of Fear (Meng and The Barbarian)	Pin^{1}
2/8/99
Dave Taylor and Fit Finlay
nWo Black & White
1/28/99
Windham and Hennig	Pin
Bobby Duncum Jr. and Mike Enos	Forfeit^{2}
2/4/99
Kaz Hayashi and Van Hammer
Duncum Jr. and Enos
2/1/99
Windham and Hennig	Pin
Barry Windham and Curt Hennig	Pin	2/21/99	2/21/99
The Four Horsemen (Chris Benoit and Dean Malenko)	Windham and Hennig	Windham and Hennig	Pin
The Four Horsemen	Sub	The Four Horsemen
First Round (Thunder)	Second Round (Nitro/Thunder)	Quarter-Finals (Nitro)	Semifinals (Thunder)
2/11/99
The Faces of Fear	2/18/99
Duncum Jr. and Enos	Pin	2/15/99	nWo Black & White
2/11/99
Enos and Scotty Riggs^{3}	The Four Horsemen	Pin^{4}
Kidman and Guerrero Jr.
2/15/99	The Four Horsemen	Sub
Taylor and Finlay	Pin
Taylor and Finlay
2/11/99
The Four Horsemen	Sub
Hayashi and Hammer
The Four Horsemen	Sub

1 This was a Lumberjack match which was made this way in order to prevent any interference from the nWo.
2 Van Hammer was attacked backstage by the nWo, forcing him and Hayashi to forfeit this match.
3 Riggs replaced Duncum Jr. who could not make it to the arena due to travel issues.
4 This was a Steel Cage match.
