= SuperBrawl 2000 =

2000 World Championship Wrestling pay-per-view event

- UK VHS cover featuring Sid Vicious, Scott Hall and Jeff Jarrett
- Promotion: World Championship Wrestling
- Date: February 20, 2000
- City: Daly City, California
- Venue: Cow Palace
- Attendance: 8,569
- Buy rate: 70,000
- Tagline: A Three-Way Dance for Heavyweight Gold!

Pay-per-view chronology
← Previous; Souled Out	Next → Uncensored

SuperBrawl chronology
← Previous; IX	Next → Revenge

SuperBrawl 2000 was the tenth SuperBrawl professional wrestling pay-per-view (PPV) event produced by World Championship Wrestling (WCW). The event took place on February 20, 2000 from the Cow Palace in Daly City, California.

The card had two billed main events plus one "Special Main Event". The final match of the night was a three-way dance, in which Sid Vicious successfully defended the WCW World Heavyweight Championship against Scott Hall and Jeff Jarrett; this was Scott Hall's final WCW match. Hulk Hogan versus The Total Package was the second billed main event. Other prominent matches were Ric Flair versus Terry Funk in a Texas Death match, and The Mamalukes (Big Vito and Johnny the Bull) versus David Flair and Crowbar in a Sicilian Stretcher match for the WCW World Tag Team Championship.

James Brown made a surprise appearance at the event, performing with Ernest Miller during his in-ring skit with The Maestro.

== Storylines ==
The event featured wrestlers from pre-existing scripted feuds and storylines. Wrestlers portrayed villains, heroes, or less distinguishable characters in the scripted events that built tension and culminated in a wrestling match or series of matches.

== Event ==
Other on-screen personnel
Role:	Name:
Commentators	Tony Schiavone
Commentators	Mike Tenay
Commentators	Mark Madden
Referees	Mickie Jay
Referees	Nick Patrick
Referees	Billy Silverman
Referees	Charles Robinson
Ring announcers	Michael Buffer (Double main event)
Ring announcers	David Penzer (Main card)
Interviewers	Pamela Paulshock
Interviewers	Gene Okerlund

=== Preliminary matches ===
The first match was a tournament final for the vacant WCW Cruiserweight Championship between The Artist Formerly Known as Prince Iaukea and Lash LeRoux. After a back and forth match, Artist's valet Paisley interfered in the match by protecting The Artist Formerly Known as Prince Iaukea from a diving hurricanrana by LeRoux, which allowed him to finish LeRoux with a diving DDT to win the Cruiserweight Championship.

The second match was a hardcore match between Bam Bam Bigelow and Brian Knobbs for the WCW Hardcore Championship. As the match progressed, Fit Finlay interfered in the match to help Knobbs. Bigelow and Knobbs brawled with each other through the crowd. Knobbs brought a table inside the ring but Bigelow drove him into the table and followed with a Greetings From Asbury Park. Bigelow climbed up the top rope for a high-flying move but Knobbs hit him with a trashcan lid shot to win the Hardcore Championship.

Next was a handicap match between Norman Smiley and 3 Count (Evan Karagias, Shannon Moore, and Shane Helms). Smiley's ribs were injured, which allowed 3 Count to take advantage. The two sides exchanged dance moves until Smiley locked in the Norman Conquest on Moore. Helms made the save and superkicked Smiley. Helms and Karagias delivered frog splashes on Smiley, thus allowing Moore to gain momentum and apply the Boston crab to make Smiley tap out.

The fourth match was a singles match between The Wall and The Demon. This match was billed as a "Special Main Event" due to a contractual obligation with Kiss that required the Demon to appear in a main event match on pay-per-view. Wall won by performing a Chokeslam.

Next was a Leather Jacket on a Pole match between Tank Abbott and Big Al. The way to win the match was to retrieve the leather jacket by climbing the pole. Abbott dominated the match and ultimately won the match by retrieving the jacket. After the match, Abbott pulled out a knife from the jacket and put it up to Al's neck.

In the sixth match, Booker took on Big T. Both men exchanged moves until Booker began gaining momentum with a Book End and a missile dropkick to Big T until the arena lights went out. An unknown man distracted Booker, allowing Big T to deliver a Pearl River Plunge to win the match.

The seventh match was between Billy Kidman and Vampiro. Kidman won the match by performing an inverted tornado DDT from the top rope.

The Mamalukes (Big Vito and Johnny the Bull) defended the WCW World Tag Team Championship against David Flair and Crowbar in a Sicilian Stretcher match, where it was stipulated that both members of a team must be taped to the stretcher to get eliminated. Disco Inferno showed up at the commentary table. Daffney interfered in the match in the earlier portion of the match and performed a hurricanrana on Johnny. Mamalukes managed to gain advantage by delivering an aided powerbomb to Flair and taping him on the stretcher to eliminate him. Flair was then taken backstage and Crowbar was left alone to fight the match. Disco also began interfering along with Mamalukes and the trio triple teamed Crowbar. Vito placed Crowbar on a table at ringside and delivered a diving splash onto Crowbar through the table. Mamalukes taped Crowbar on the stretcher and took him backstage to win the match and retain their titles.

The final match on the undercard puts Ric Flair and Terry Funk in a Texas death match. Funk scored the first pinfall by suplexing Flair on the floor and Flair survived the referee's 10 count. Flair then made Funk submit to the figure four leglock, making Funk vulnerable for the 10 count but he survived it. After back and forth action, Flair performed a Piledriver on the floor followed by another piledriver on the exposed concrete to pin him but Flair managed to survive the 10 count. Funk then placed a table inside the ring and put Flair on it. He climbed the top rope and tried to perform a moonsault but Flair pushed him off and Funk fell down through the table. Flair then pinned Funk and Funk became unconscious, thus failing to answer the referee's 10 count and Flair won the match.

=== Main event matches ===
The first of the double main event featured Hulk Hogan taking on The Total Package. Back and forth action took place between the two men until Elizabeth interfered on The Total Package's behalf by attacking Hogan with a baseball bat. Jimmy Hart came to the ringside to take the bat away from Elizabeth and prevent her from interfering. Hogan attacked The Total Package with a cast on his arm and delivered a Leg Drop to win the match. After the match, The Total Package and Ric Flair attacked Hogan and Hart until a returning Sting made the save with his baseball bat.

The second of the double main event featured Sid Vicious defending the WCW World Heavyweight Championship against Scott Hall and Jeff Jarrett in a Three-Way Dance. Harris Brothers interfered on Jarrett's behalf throughout the match. The referee was knocked out midway through the match until Nick Patrick came in to replace him. Jarrett took him out with a Stroke and then Charles Robinson ran to the ring to officiate the match but he was also taken out by Jarrett with a Stroke. Mark Johnson came in next to officiate the match on Jarrett's behalf. Roddy Piper came to the ring and knocked him out and took the duties of referee himself. Vicious delivered a Chokeslam to Jarrett and a Powerbomb to Hall to win the match.

== Reception ==
In 2016, Kevin Pantoja of 411Mania gave the event a rating of 1.0 [Extremely Horrendous], stating, "This was better than the atrocity that was Souled Out the prior month, but JUST barely. I mean, this is awful. Only two matches reach two stars and that’s the ceiling for this show. Before the Vampiro/Kidman match, this was in worst show in history territory. The second half proved to be bad but not pitifully bad so that saved it from a zero."

== Results ==
No.	Results	Stipulations	Times
1	The Artist Formerly Known as Prince Iaukea (with Paisley) defeated Lash LeRoux	Singles match for the vacant WCW Cruiserweight Championship	05:47
2	Brian Knobbs (with Fit Finlay) defeated Bam Bam Bigelow (c)	Hardcore match for the WCW Hardcore Championship	04:44
3	3 Count (Evan Karagias, Shannon Moore, and Shane Helms) defeated Norman Smiley	Handicap match	04:06
4	The Wall defeated The Demon	Singles match “Special Main Event”	03:37
5	Tank Abbott defeated Big Al	Leather Jacket on a Pole match	04:34
6	Big T (with Stevie Ray and J. Biggs) defeated Booker	Singles match for ownership of the Harlem Heat franchise and the letter "T"	05:23
7	Billy Kidman (with Torrie Wilson) defeated Vampiro	Singles match	07:20
8	The Mamalukes (Big Vito and Johnny the Bull) (c) defeated David Flair and Crowbar (with Daffney)	Sicilian Stretcher match for the WCW World Tag Team Championship	11:22
9	Ric Flair defeated Terry Funk	Texas Death match	15:40
10	Hulk Hogan defeated The Total Package (with Elizabeth)	Singles match	08:10
11	Sid Vicious (c) defeated Scott Hall and Jeff Jarrett (with The Harris Brothers)	Three-Way Dance for the WCW World Heavyweight Championship	07:40
(c) / – the champion(s) heading into the match

=== Tournament brackets ===
Quarterfinals
Psychosis
Kaz Hayashi
TAFKA Prince Iaukea
Kid Romeo
Lash LeRoux
Evan Karagias
Shannon Moore
Shane Helms

Semifinals
Kaz Hayashi	^{1}
TAFKA Prince Iaukea
Lash Leroux
Shannon Moore

Final
TAFKA Prince Iaukea	Win
Lash Leroux

^1Psychosis originally defeated Kaz Hayashi in the first round, but was unable to compete in the semifinals, so Hayashi was allowed back into the tournament.
