= WWE 2K16 =

2015 video game

- Cover art featuring Stone Cold Steve Austin
- Developer: Yuke's (Note: Additional work by Visual Concepts; PC version developed by QLOC.)
- Publisher: 2K
- Series: WWE 2K
- Platforms: PlayStation 3 PlayStation 4 Xbox 360; Xbox One; Microsoft Windows
- Release: PlayStation 3, PlayStation 4, Xbox 360, Xbox One: NA: October 27, 2015; AU: October 29, 2015; EU: October 30, 2015; Microsoft Windows: NA: March 11, 2016; AU: March 12, 2016; EU: March 13, 2016
- Genre: Sports
- Modes: Single-player, multiplayer

WWE 2K16 is a professional wrestling video game developed by Yuke's and published by 2K for Microsoft Windows, PlayStation 3, PlayStation 4, Xbox 360 and Xbox One. It is the sequel to WWE 2K15, and was succeeded by WWE 2K17. It was released on October 27, 2015, in North America and on October 30, 2015, in Europe, while being released on PC on March 11, 2016. It was the last game that released during the Reality Era.

== Gameplay ==
=== Roster ===
2K announced on their social media accounts that WWE 2K16 will feature the "largest roster in the game's history", featuring over 120 unique playable characters, nearly double the 67 that were in last year's game. A developer for the game then clarified that the 120 unique playable characters count does not include potential DLC, and that all 120 characters are included and will be released with the game. 2K revealed that despite "push(ing) as hard as we could" to include them, for "various reasons," Sasha Banks, Charlotte, Becky Lynch, and Bayley (the Four Horsewomen of NXT) will not be in the game or included as DLC. Hulk Hogan was announced as being part of the game, but was cut late in development due to the release of controversial racial statements he had made previously. 2K16 features 26 wrestling superstars making their WWE games franchise debut.

=== Visuals and audio ===
Screenshot showing the improvement in detail of Neville's character model

The commentary team has been expanded to three members, with John "Bradshaw" Layfield joining the returning Michael Cole and Jerry Lawler. Jim Ross returns to call matches alongside Lawler in the Steve Austin showcase. The game features new cloth physics and animations, creating more realistic attire. The variety of the crowd has been improved as well. Hair physics and sweat features have been improved. In the PS3 and Xbox 360 versions, which follows the same gameplay blueprint from WWE 2K14, only Michael Cole and Jerry Lawler are present for commentary outside of Showcase mode. WWE 2K16 features a licensed soundtrack that consists of twelve songs, as well as users, can use entrance theme song of superstar/Diva to be played in the menu.

=== Game modes ===
==== 2K Showcase ====
The 2K Showcase mode also returns, with the showcase detailing the career of the cover star "Stone Cold" Steve Austin, from his King of the Ring 1996 matchup against Jake Roberts in the final match of the 1996 King of the Ring tournament, to his WrestleMania XIX matchup against The Rock. A second showcase becomes available only with purchase of the 'Hall of Fame' DLC pack, a collection of classic matches featuring each of the WWE Hall of Fame Class of 2015 entrants (excluding Celebrity Wing recipient, Arnold Schwarzenegger) in order, from Randy Savage VS. Jake Roberts at This Tuesday in Texas to The Outsiders (Kevin Nash and Scott Hall) VS. Harlem Heat (Booker T and Stevie Ray) at WCW Halloween Havoc 1996, including a fictional match between Alundra Blaze VS. Paige at the WrestleMania 31 arena.

==== MyCareer ====
MyCareer returns from 2K15, with 2K claiming the mode will be significantly expanded from last year's game. The mode is only available on PlayStation 4, Xbox One and Microsoft Windows versions. Several changes have been made in order to give the player more control over their superstar. The character's personality can be influenced through actions, such as forming alliances and rivalries. The Authority are featured in the mode, with the player having the option to support or defy them, causing their career to be influenced. Players are also able to interfere in other superstar's matches in order to create rivalries.

==== Universe ====
WWE Universe mode allows the player to create their own WWE shows and pay-per-view events, allowing them to create rivalries and feuds for singles wrestlers and/or tag team wrestlers, and will let them create custom arenas and championship titles.

==== Online ====
Players were able to have a variety of different matches connecting with other players online. The online mode was discontinued on May 31, 2017, after 2K's announcement on Twitter.

=== Creative Suite ===
Create a Diva, Create a Show, Create an Arena, and Create a Championship features that were removed in WWE 2K15 have returned in 2K16. The create a superstar feature includes several new features, such as hair dye, change material properties (for example, having a mask or shirt be vinyl, cloth or satin) and new face photo importing tool. The amount of available save slots for created superstars has been increased to 100, the same number as in 2K14 and four times the amount available in 2K15.

== Upgrades from previous games ==
WWE 2K16 video game featured several upgrades and additions to the gameplay. Rest holds have been added, allowing characters to slow down the match to regain stamina. Reversals have been changed to a set amount per match; to prevent players from spamming them. There are no longer loading screens between entrances; and players have the option of running in on an entrance and attacking their opponent. Pins and submissions have changed in an effort to make gameplay "fairer".

== Marketing and promotion ==
On June 16, 2015, WWE 2K16 was officially announced by WWE and 2K, when they revealed the first six superstars and divas, who would be included on the game's roster. On July 6, 2015, "Stone Cold Steve Austin was announced as the cover superstar for this year's game, accompanying by the debut trailer, which features Austin digging up at the desert, uncovering his customized "Smoking Skull" championship belt and putting it over his shoulder, before turning his head, just to stare down and at the camera.

On July 27, 2015, 2K announced that Arnold Schwarzenegger's T-800 Terminator (both The Terminator and Terminator 2: Judgment Day versions) will be a playable character available as a pre-order exclusive. On the same day, the second trailer featuring Arnold Schwarzenegger, Daniel Bryan, Eva Marie, Paige, Finn Bálor and Dean Ambrose was released to promote the inclusion of the Terminator character in the game. The trailer was a re-enactment of the bar scene from Terminator 2: Judgment Day.

On August 4, 2015, IGN revealed the first screenshots, gameplay and entrances for WWE 2K16 at Gamescom. IGN then handled the release of newer screenshots, animations, features, and artwork that would be included in the game. They also handled the weekly release of superstars who would be featured in the game, dubbing it "IGN's Roster 3:16". An Arabic localization has been announced for Middle Eastern countries. The demo for the game was playable at selected Walmart locations across the United States as part of the "WWE 2K16 Early Access Tour". 2K then released a trailer detailing the MyCareer mode of the game on September 25, 2015. The series of trailers featuring Stone Cold preaching from "The Book of Austin" gave details on the game's roster, three man commentary, the game's soundtrack, and the game's feature set. The third live-action trailer, titled "Bonfire" was released starring Austin, Sting, Seth Rollins, Rusev, Paige, Kane and Ambrose on October 20, 2015.

On February 17, 2016, a Microsoft Windows version was announced, and it was released on March 10, 2016. The PC release includes all the previously released DLC for free.

=== Downloadable content ===
On October 7, 2015, 2K revealed the game's post-launch season pass and DLC information. The season pass includes the Legends Pack (featuring these playable characters such as Big Boss Man, Dusty Rhodes, Lita, Mr. Perfect, Roddy Piper and Trish Stratus), the 2015 Hall of Fame Showcase (which features these wrestlers, who have been inducted into the 2015's WWE Hall of Fame, also it features these playable matches that includes Randy Savage vs. Jake Roberts; Rikishi vs. The Rock; Alundra Blayze vs. Paige; Tatsumi Fujinami vs. Ric Flair; The Bushwackers vs. The Natural Disasters; The Outsiders vs. Harlem Heat, and Ricky Steamboat and Dustin Rhodes vs. The Enforcers), the New Moves Pack (featuring several new animations and wrestling moves), and the Future Stars pack (which features playable characters such as Samoa Joe, Blake and Murphy and Los Matadores). In addition, a MyPlayer KickStart was announced as a boost for player stats in MyCareer mode. The digital deluxe edition, featuring the game, season pass, MyPlayer boost, and a digital theme was also announced. All season pass content was released on March 31, 2016.

== Reception ==
Reception

Aggregate score
Aggregator	Score
Metacritic	(PC) 74/100 (PS4) 73/100 (XONE) 72/100

Review scores
Publication	Score
Electronic Gaming Monthly	8/10
Game Informer	6.25/10
GameRevolution	4/5
GameSpot	4/10
GamesRadar+	4/5
Giant Bomb	2/5
IGN	8.8/10

WWE 2K16 game received "mixed to average" reviews and ratings, according to review aggregator Metacritic. Eurogamer called it "best wrestling game in years", praising the gameplay changes and deep roster, while noting long load times. In a positive review, IGN called the game a "step in the right direction" for the series and praised the gameplay and roster features, but criticized overall inconsistency within the game. GameSpot rated the game a harsher 4/10, praising the 2K Showcase mode and the return of Jim Ross on commentary but saying that "Little else in the game makes much of a positive impression".

== See also ==
- List of licensed wrestling video games
- List of fighting games
- List of video games in the WWE 2K Games series
- WWE 2K
