= Brian Knobbs =

American professional wrestler (born 1964)

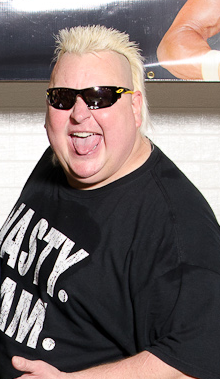
- Knobbs in 2011

Personal information
- Born: Brian Yandrisovitz; May 6, 1964 (age 62) Allentown, Pennsylvania, U.S.
- Family: Greg Valentine (brother-in-law)

Professional wrestling career
- Ring name(s): Brian Knobbs; The Terrorist
- Billed height: 6 ft 1 in (185 cm)
- Billed weight: 295 lb (134 kg)
- Billed from: Allentown, Pennsylvania "Nastyville")
- Trained by: Brad Rheingans
- Debut: 1985
- Retired: 2019

Brian Yandrisovitz (born May 6, 1964) is an American retired professional wrestler, better known by his ring name, Brian Knobbs. He is best known for tag teaming with Jerry Sags as the Nasty Boys. Over the course of his career, Knobbs wrestled for promotions including the American Wrestling Association, All Japan Pro Wrestling, World Championship Wrestling, the World Wrestling Federation, and New Japan Pro-Wrestling, holding championships such as the WCW World Tag Team Championship and WWF Tag Team Championship.

== Early life ==
Yandrisovitz was born on May 6, 1964, in Allentown, Pennsylvania. He attended Whitehall High School in Whitehall Township, Pennsylvania, in the Lehigh Valley region of eastern Pennsylvania, where he played football for the Whitehall Zephyrs. While at Whitehall High School, Knobbs befriended Jerry Saganowich. After leaving high school, Yandrisovitz served three years in the military and was honorably discharged.

== Professional wrestling career ==
=== Early career (1986–1988) ===
While working as a mechanic, Yandrisovitz met Steve Burker, a friend of professional wrestler George "The Animal" Steele, who encouraged him to attend the Verne Gagne Wrestling School in Hamel, Minnesota. Enrolling in the school alongside Jerry Saganowich, Yandrisovitz was trained to wrestle by Brad Rheingans. He began his career in October 1986 in Gagne's Minneapolis, Minnesota-based American Wrestling Association, wrestling under the ring name "Brian Knobbs". In early 1987, he formed a tag team, "the Nasty Boys", with Saganowich, who had adopted the ring name Jerry Sags. In mid 1987, he wrestled a handful of matches as masked wrestler "the Terrorist", including teaming with The Mercenary in a loss to Jimmy Snuka and Russ Francis at SuperClash II. He left the AWA in June 1987.

In July 1987, Knobbs and Sags joined the Memphis, Tennessee-based Continental Wrestling Association. In September 1987, they defeated Badd Company for the AWA Southern Tag Team Championship; they lost the titles to the Rock 'n' Roll RPMs later that month. In October 1987, they defeated the Rock 'n' Roll RPMs to win the titles for a second time, but lost the titles back to them a week later. They left the CWA in January 1988.

In January 1988, the Nasty Boys returned to the AWA. They faced the Midnight Rockers in several bouts for the AWA World Tag Team Championship, but failed to win the titles. They left the AWA once more in April 1988.

=== Professional Wrestling Federation (1988–1990) ===
In mid-1988, the Nasty Boys joined the Florida-based Professional Wrestling Federation (PWF). In November 1988, they defeated Johnny Ace and The Terminator for the PWF Tag Team Championship. In January 1989, they lost the titles back to Ace and The Terminator. They defeated Ace and The Terminator to win the titles for a second time in March 1989, but lost them to Southern Force (Black Bart and Bobby Jaggers) several days later. In June 1989, they defeated Bart and Tony Anthony to become three-time PWF Tag Team Champions. They lost the titles to Brett Sawyer and Jim Backlund on an unrecorded date, but regained them in August 1989. In October 1989, they lost the titles to Dennis Knight and Jumbo Baretta. In January 1990, they won the titles for a fifth and final time, defeating Bounty Hunter #1 and The Terminator at a PWF event in Nassau, Bahamas. They lost the titles to Kendall Windham and Robert Fuller on an unrecorded date. They left the PWF in mid-1990.

=== All Japan Pro Wrestling (1989) ===
In November and December 1989, the Nasty Boys wrestled in Japan for All Japan Pro Wrestling. They competed in the Real World Tag League for the vacant World Tag Team Championship, tying with The Great Kabuki and Shunji Takano in last place after losing eight matches and winning one.

=== World Championship Wrestling (1990) ===
In August 1990, the Nasty Boys began wrestling for the Carolinas-based National Wrestling Alliance (NWA)-affiliate World Championship Wrestling (WCW). In their debut match, on NWA Main Event, they defeated Barry Horowitz and Dave Diamond. The following month, at Clash of the Champions XII, they defeated Jackie Fulton and Terry Taylor. In October 1990, the Nasty Boys began feuding with the Steiner Brothers over the NWA United States Tag Team Championship (Mid-Atlantic version), including a bout at Halloween Havoc in Chicago, Illinois on October 27. In November 1990, they faced the Steiner Brothers in a series of cage matches. The Nasty Boys left WCW in December 1990 to join the World Wrestling Federation.

=== World Wrestling Federation (1990–1993) ===
In December 1990, the Nasty Boys joined the World Wrestling Federation (WWF), aligning themselves with Jimmy Hart. The following month, at the Royal Rumble, Sags defeated Sam Houston in a dark match. Following a feud with the Bushwhackers, at WrestleMania VII in March 1991 they defeated the Hart Foundation for the WWF World Tag Team Championship. After WrestleMania, they began feuding with the Legion of Doom. At SummerSlam in August 1991, the Legion of Doom defeated them in a street fight to win the titles.

In September 1991, Knobbs entered the King of the Ring tournament, but was eliminated in the first round by Jim Duggan. At Survivor Series in November 1991, the Nasty Boys teamed with the Beverly Brothers to defeat the Bushwhackers and the Rockers in a Survivor Series match. Over the following months, they had a series of matches with the Bushwhackers, the Rockers, and Jim Duggan and Sgt. Slaughter.

At WrestleMania VIII in April 1992, they teamed with Repo Man and The Mountie in a loss to Duggan, Slaughter, Big Boss Man, and Virgil. Following WrestleMania, they had a series of matches against Jim Powers and Owen Hart, then against High Energy (Hart and Koko B. Ware). In a dark match at SummerSlam in August 1992, they teamed with the Mountie in a loss to Duggan and the Bushwhackers.

In autumn 1992, the Nasty Boys parted ways with Jimmy Hart and turned face, feuding with the Natural Disasters. At Survivor Series in November 1992, they defeated the Beverly Brothers, the Natural Disasters and Money Inc. (Ted DiBiase and Irwin R. Schyster) in an elimination match. Following Survivor Series, they began feuding with Money Inc. over the WWF World Tag Team Championship, but were unable to win the titles. At the Royal Rumble in January 1993, Knobbs entered at number five, being eliminated by DiBiase.

In March 1993, the Nasty Boys began feuding with the Headshrinkers. In April 1993 they took part in the WWF's spring tour of Europe, during which Knobbs lost to Headshrinker Fatu at Rampage. The Nasty Boys left the WWF following the tour.

=== World Championship Wrestling (1993–1997) ===
In July 1993, the Nasty Boys returned to World Championship Wrestling, where they were paired with manager Missy Hyatt. In September 1993 at Fall Brawl '93: War Games, they defeated Arn Anderson and Paul Roma for the WCW World Tag Team Championship. The following month, they lost the titles to 2 Cold Scorpio and Marcus Alexander Bagwell in a bout that aired on WCW Saturday Night. They regained the titles in a rematch the following month at Halloween Havoc.

In late 1993, the Nasty Boys took part in WCW's tour of Europe. At Clash of the Champions XXV in November 1993, they defeated Davey Boy Smith and Sting. At Battlebowl in November 1993, Knobbs qualified for the titular battle royal, which was won by Vader. At Starrcade '93: 10th Anniversary, they defended their titles against Road Warrior Hawk and Sting, who won the bout by disqualification, meaning the titles did not change hands. (Due to an incident during the match at Starrcade, Hyatt left WCW in February 1994.)

In January 1994 at Clash of the Champions XXVI, the Nasty Boys lost to Cactus Jack and Maxx Payne in a non-title match. At SuperBrawl IV in February 1994, Jack and Payne challenged the Nasty Boys for the WCW World Tag Team Championship, winning by disqualification; Knobbs suffered an injured shoulder during the bout. At Spring Stampede, the Nasty Boys defeated Jack and Payne in a Chicago street fight. At Slamboree '94: A Legends' Reunion in May 1994, the Nasty Boys once again defended their titles against Jack and Kevin Sullivan in a Broad Street Bully match with Dave Schultz as special guest referee; Jack and Sullivan defeated them to win the titles following interference by Payne and Evad Sullivan. In June 1994 at Clash of the Champions XXVII, the Nasty Boys challenged Jack and Sullivan in a rematch, but failed to regain the titles.

In August 1994, the Nasty Boys began feuding with Pretty Wonderful, who they defeated at Clash of the Champions XXVIII. In September 1994, they took part in the "Hulkamania" tour of Europe. They went on to feud with the Stud Stable At Fall Brawl '94: War Games later that month, they teamed with Dustin Rhodes and Dusty Rhodes to defeat the Stud Stable in a WarGames match. At Halloween Havoc in October 1994, they defeated the Stud Stable.

In late 1994, the Nasty Boys began feuding with Harlem Heat, who defeated them at Clash of the Champions XXIX. At Starrcade '94: Triple Threat in December 1994, they defeated Harlem Heat by disqualification. After Harlem Heat won the WCW World Tag Team Championship, the Nasty Boys began challenging them for the titles. At SuperBrawl V in February 1995, the Nasty Boys lost to Harlem Heat by disqualification. At Uncensored the following month, they defeated Harlem Heat in a non-title match. On May 21, 1995 at Slamboree '95: A Legends' Reunion, they defeated Harlem Heat for their third and final WCW World Tag Team Championship; their reign ended when they lost the titles back to Harlem Heat in a match that aired on WCW WorldWide on June 24 (but which was pre-recorded on May 3, prior to their winning the titles).

In June 1995, the Nasty Boys began feuding with the Blue Bloods. At Bash at the Beach in July 1995, they faced WCW World Tag Team Champions Harlem Heat and the Blue Bloods in a triangle match that was won by Harlem Heat.

In December 1995 at World War 3, Knobbs took part in the titular World War 3 match for the vacant WCW World Heavyweight Championship, which was won by Randy Savage.

In January 1996, the Nasty Boys began feuding with the Public Enemy, who they wrestled to a double disqualification at Clash of the Champions XXXII that month. At SuperBrawl VI in February 1996, they defeated the Public Enemy in a falls count anywhere match. At Bash at the Beach in July 1996, they defeated the Public Enemy in a dog collar match.

In July 1996, Knobbs unsuccessfully challenged the Giant for the WCW World Heavyweight Championship in a bout that aired on WCW Saturday Night. At Fall Brawl '96: War Games in September 1996, the Nasty Boys unsuccessfully challenged Harlem Heat for the WCW World Tag Team Championship.

On the September 23, 1996 episode of WCW Monday Nitro, Hollywood Hulk Hogan attempted to entice the Nasty Boys into joining his New World Order (nWo) stable. Over the following weeks, the Nasty Boys fraternized with the nWo. The angle culminated on the October 14 episode of WCW Monday Nitro, when the Nasty Boys came to the ring with the nWo wearing their t-shirts in anticipation of signing contracts to join the stable, only for the nWo to turn on them and beat them down. In November 1995 at World War 3, the Nasty Boys and the Faces of Fear both challenged nWo members the Outsiders for the WCW World Tag Team Championship, but failed to win the titles. The Nasty Boys went on to feud with the Outsiders.

During a match in November 1996, Jerry Sags received a stiff chair shot to the back of the head from Scott Hall, concussing him. During a match in Shreveport, Louisiana on January 4, 1997, Sags received another stiff blow to the back of the head; believing Hall had given him another chair shot, he became enraged and legitimately punched Hall, knocking his tooth out. Later, upon viewing footage of the incident, Sags realized that Hall's partner Kevin Nash had in fact been the one to strike him. The incident led to the Nasty Boys leaving WCW in February 1997, with Sags retiring.

=== New Japan Pro-Wrestling (1993–1995) ===
The Nasty Boys debuted in New Japan Pro-Wrestling (NJPW) in August 1993 as part of its G1 Climax event in the Ryogoku Kokugikan in Tokyo. During their five day tour, they wrestled opponents including the Hell Raisers, Raging Staff (Hiro Saito and Super Strong Machine), and King Haku and the Barbarian. In November 1993, the Nasty Boys returned to NJPW as part of its "Battle Final" tour. In December 1993, they unsuccessfully challenged the Jurassic Powers for the IWGP Tag Team Championship.

In June to July 1994, the Nasty Boys returned to NJPW as part of its "Summer Struggle" event, facing teams such as J-J-Jacks and the Steiner Brothers. They made a further tour in March 1995 as part of the "Muscle Storm" event. They wrestled their final matches for NJPW in November 1995 as part of the two-night "WCW World in Japan" event jointly promoted by NJPW and WCW, defeating Ookami Gundan in the Hamamatsu Arena in Hamamatsu, Shizuoka on the first night, then losing to Masa Saito and Riki Choshu in the Ryōgoku Kokugikan in Tokyo on the second night.

=== Independent circuit (1997–1999) ===
From 1997 to 1999, Knobbs wrestled on the independent circuit.

=== World Championship Wrestling (1999–2000) ===
In April 1999, Knobbs returned to World Championship Wrestling as a singles wrestler, competing in its hardcore division again wrestlers such as Fit Finlay and Hardcore Hak. At Slamboree in May 1999, he lost to Bam Bam Bigelow in a hardcore match.

Knobbs joined Jimmy Hart's First Family stable. He teamed with First Family members Hugh Morrus and Barbarian. At Fall Brawl in September 1999, he and Morrus defeated The Revolution. At Halloween Havoc in October 1999, he and Morrus took part in a triangle match for the WCW World Tag Team Championship that was won by Harlem Heat. The following night, Knobbs entered a tournament for the vacant WCW World Heavyweight Championship, losing to Sting in the first round.

At Mayhem in November 1999, Knobbs lost to Norman Smiley in a match for the vacant WCW Hardcore Championship. On January 11, 2000, Knobbs defeated Smiley for the title in a bout that aired on WCW Thunder. At Souled Out later that month, he successfully defended the title in a four way match against Fit Finlay, Meng, and Norman Smiley. His reign lasted until the February 7, 2000 episode of WCW Monday Nitro, when he lost to Bam Bam Bigelow. Later that month, he took part in WCW's "Millennium Tour" of Germany. At SuperBrawl 2000 on February 20, 2000, he defeated Bigelow to regain the WCW Hardcore Championship. His second reign ended on the February 28 episode of WCW Monday Nitro, when he lost to all three members of 3 Count in a handicap match.

In late February 2000, Knobbs formed a short-lived stable known as the "Hardcore Soldiers" with Fit Finlay and The Dog. In early March, he took part in WCW's "Millennium Tour" of the United Kingdom. At Uncensored on March 19, he defeated the members of 3 Count in a gauntlet match to win the WCW Hardcore Championship for a third and final time. His reign lasted until April 10, 2000, when WCW Presidents Eric Bischoff and Vince Russo vacated every WCW championship as part of a "reboot" of WCW. Knobbs left WCW later that month.

=== Late career (2000–2019) ===
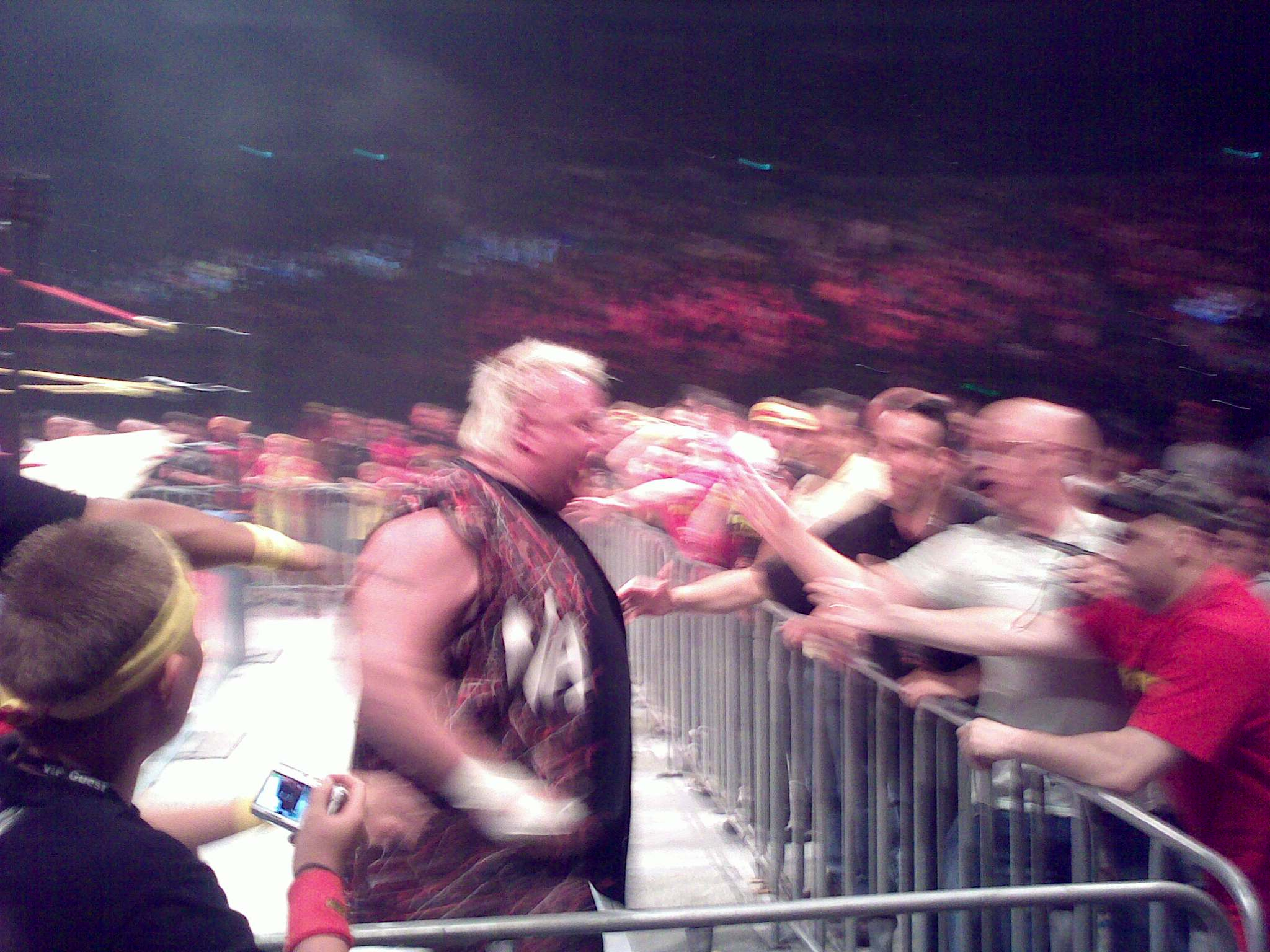
Knobbs on the Hulkamania Tour in November 2009

After leaving WCW, Knobbs began wrestling on the independent circuit.

On November 20, 2007, Knobbs and Sags reformed as The Nasty Boys, performing in a dark match at the SmackDown! tapings from Tampa, Florida, to wrestle their first WWE match in years. According to reports, the match was disastrous, and the team were accused of unprofessionally working stiff with their opponents, Dave Taylor and Drew McIntyre. Knobbs and Saggs won the match.

On January 4, 2010, The Nasty Boys appeared on Total Nonstop Action Wrestling (TNA)'s television show, TNA Impact!, and started a feud with Team 3D. On the January 21 edition of Impact!, they competed in their first match for TNA, defeating the team of Eric Young and Kevin Nash. At Against All Odds in Orlando, Florida, The Nasty Boys defeated Team 3D in a tag team match in which Jimmy Hart made his return to the company and interfered in the match on the Nasty Boys' behalf. On the February 25, 2010, edition of Impact!, Team 3D defeated the Nasty Boys in a tables match, when Jesse Neal interfered on Team 3D's behalf. The Nasty Boys and Hart continued their feud with Team 3D by defeating them and the returning Brother Runt, a replacement for Jesse Neal, who The Nasty Boys attacked prior to the match in a six-man tag team match. After the match, Neal attacked The Nastys and helped Team 3D throw Sags through a table. On March 29, 2010, The Nasty Boys were released by TNA following an incident at a TNA function attended by Spike TV executives.

In February 2012, Knobbs was involved in an altercation with fellow wrestler New Jack with New Jack allegedly knocking Knobbs out.

From 2010 to 2019, Knobbs wrestled on the independent circuit, primarily in tag team matches with Sags. He wrestled the final match of his career on April 20, 2019.

== Professional wrestling style and persona ==
As one-half of the Nasty Boys, Knobbs portrayed a "mohawked thug", "sweaty, toothless punk", and "tough degenerate".

Knobbs wrestled in a brawling, "smash-mouth" style. His finishing move was a running powerslam. His signature moves included the "Pitstop" (where he would rub an opponents face in his armpit). As one-half of the Nasty Boys, his finisher was the "Trip to Nastyville": a running powerslam by Knobbs, followed by a diving elbow drop from Sags.

== Personal life ==
In January 1994, Yandrisovitz was stabbed four times during an altercation in Peoria, Illinois. Three people were subsequently arrested and charged with aggravated battery, armed violence, mob action with injury, and weapons violations.

Since January 1994, Yandrisovitz has been married to the sister of Greg Valentine. The couple have one child.

In 2019, Yandrisovitz was hospitalized with a blood infection and had surgery on one of his knees. His medical bills were paid by fans through a GoFundMe campaign. On August 10, 2021, he was hospitalized again for multiple health issues and another GoFundMe was set up for his expenses. On March 4, 2025, another GoFundMe was started after Knobbs posted on social media that he was back in the hospital again and facing a possible foot amputation. Knobbs and his wife were also left homeless due to Hurricane Milton destroying their home and all of their belongings.

== Other work ==
Knobbs has appeared in several episodes of Hogan Knows Best and Brooke Knows Best, and was an on-screen trainer for Hulk Hogan's Celebrity Championship Wrestling and Hulk Hogan's Micro Championship Wrestling. During the 2009 Major League Baseball season, Knobbs performed a "Pit Stop" on Raymond, the Tampa Bay Rays mascot. Knobbs serves as the "10th Man" for the Tampa Bay Rays. He also appeared as a panelist on the Nickelodeon children's game show Figure It Out: Wild Style in 1999, getting slimed.

== Championships and accomplishments ==
- Cauliflower Alley Club
  - Tag Team Award (2023) – with Jerry Sags
- Championship Wrestling International
  - CWI Tag Team Championship (1 time) – with Jerry Sags
- Continental Wrestling Association
  - AWA Southern Tag Team Championship (2 times) – with Jerry Sags
- North American Wrestling Association / South Atlantic Pro Wrestling
  - NAWA/SAPW Tag Team Championship (1 time) – with Jerry Sags
- Professional Wrestling Federation
  - FCW Tag Team Championship (5 times) – with Jerry Sags
- Pro Wrestling Illustrated
  - PWI Tag Team of the Year award in 1994 – with Jerry Sags.
  - PWI ranked him # 409 of the 500 best singles wrestlers during the "PWI Years" in 2003.
  - PWI ranked him # 53 of the 100 best tag teams of the "PWI Years" with Jerry Sags in 2003.
- Professional Wrestling Federation
  - PWF Tag Team Championship (1 time) – with Jerry Sags
- World Championship Wrestling
  - WCW Hardcore Championship (3 times)
  - WCW World Tag Team Championship (3 times) – with Jerry Sags
- World Wrestling Federation
  - WWF World Tag Team Championship (1 time) – with Jerry Sags
- X Wrestling Federation
  - XWF World Tag Team Championship (1 time) – with Jerry Sags
- Yankee Pro Wrestling
  - YPW Heavyweight Championship (1 time)
