= SuperBrawl =

WCW pay-per-view

- Promotions: World Championship Wrestling
- Brands: WCW/NWO (1998–1999)
- First event: SuperBrawl I
- Last event: SuperBrawl Revenge

SuperBrawl was an annual professional wrestling pay-per-view (PPV) event in World Championship Wrestling (WCW) held in May 1991 and February from 1992 through 2001. Along with Starrcade, Bash at the Beach, The Great American Bash, and Halloween Havoc, SuperBrawl was booked to be one of WCW's flagship pay-per-views. The first SuperBrawl was held in May, but from 1992 onward it was held in February to coincide with the Super Bowl, which inspired the SuperBrawl name. Events from 1992 to 1999 were identified by Roman numerals in its logo and announced on-screen with its corresponding number. The final installment in 2001 was the penultimate WCW PPV as the organization folded a month later. Sting holds the record for most appearances at the pay-per-view with eight. In 2015, all WCW pay-per-views were made available on the WWE Network.

The trademark was owned by the WWE after it bought the promotion's intellectual properties in March 2001 and expired in 2005. Cody Rhodes subsequently filed to claim the SuperBrawl trademark in November 2019. In November 2020, a settlement was reached between Cody Rhodes and WWE in which Cody gained the "Cody Rhodes" trademark, which WWE had held onto after his run in that company, in exchange for WWE gaining the WCW event name trademarks that Cody had claimed, including SuperBrawl.

A Super NES video game named after the event, titled WCW SuperBrawl Wrestling, was released in 1994.

== SuperBrawl dates and venues ==
WCW/nWo co-branded event

Event	Date	City	Venue	Main Event
SuperBrawl I	May 19, 1991	St. Petersburg, Florida	Bayfront Center	Ric Flair (c) vs. Tatsumi Fujinami (c) for the WCW and NWA World Heavyweight Championships
SuperBrawl II	February 29, 1992	Milwaukee, Wisconsin	Milwaukee Theatre at the MECCA	Lex Luger (c) vs. Sting for the WCW World Heavyweight Championship
SuperBrawl III	February 21, 1993	Asheville, North Carolina	Asheville Civic Center	Big Van Vader vs. Sting in a White Castle of Fear Strap match
SuperBrawl IV	February 20, 1994	Albany, Georgia	Albany Civic Center	Ric Flair (c) vs. Big Van Vader in a Thundercage match for the WCW World Heavyweight Championship with special guest referee The Boss
SuperBrawl V	February 19, 1995	Baltimore, Maryland	Baltimore Arena	Hulk Hogan (c) vs. Vader for the WCW World Heavyweight Championship
SuperBrawl VI	February 11, 1996	St. Petersburg, Florida	Bayfront Center	Hulk Hogan vs. The Giant in a Steel Cage match
SuperBrawl VII	February 23, 1997	San Francisco, California	Cow Palace	Hollywood Hogan (c) vs. Roddy Piper for the WCW World Heavyweight Championship
SuperBrawl VIII	February 22, 1998	San Francisco, California	Cow Palace	Sting vs. Hollywood Hogan for the vacant WCW World Heavyweight Championship
SuperBrawl IX	February 21, 1999	Oakland, California	Oakland Arena	Hollywood Hogan (c) vs. Ric Flair for the WCW World Heavyweight Championship
SuperBrawl 2000	February 20, 2000	San Francisco, California	Cow Palace	Sid Vicious (c) vs. Scott Hall vs. Jeff Jarrett in a Triple threat match for the WCW World Heavyweight Championship
SuperBrawl Revenge	February 18, 2001	Nashville, Tennessee	Nashville Municipal Auditorium	Scott Steiner (c) vs. Kevin Nash in a Retirement match for the WCW World Heavyweight Championship
(c) – refers to the champion(s) heading into the match
