= SuperBrawl VI =

1996 World Championship Wrestling pay-per-view event

- Promotional poster featuring the WCW World Heavyweight Championship.
- Promotion: World Championship Wrestling
- Date: February 11, 1996
- City: St. Petersburg, Florida, United States
- Venue: Bayfront Center
- Attendance: 7,200
- Buy rate: 210,000
- Tagline: The Brawl for the Belt!

Pay-per-view chronology
← Previous; Starrcade	Next → Uncensored

SuperBrawl chronology
← Previous; V	Next → VII

SuperBrawl VI was the sixth SuperBrawl professional wrestling pay-per-view (PPV) event produced by World Championship Wrestling (WCW). The event took place on February 11, 1996, from the Bayfront Center in St. Petersburg, Florida in the United States.

The main event was a steel cage match between Hulk Hogan and The Giant. Hogan defeated Giant to win the match. This event marked Brian Pillman's final match in WCW.

== Storylines ==
The event featured wrestlers from pre-existing scripted feuds and storylines. On the February 4 episode of WCW Main Event, it was announced that One Man Gang would defend the United States Heavyweight Championship against Konnan at SuperBrawl VI. Later that night, Konnan defeated One Man Gang to win the title. The following night, on WCW Monday Nitro, it was announced that the title match would remain at the SuperBrawl card with Konnan defending the title against One Man Gang in a rematch.

== Event ==
Other on-screen personnel
Role:	Name:
Commentators	Tony Schiavone
Commentators	Bobby Heenan
Commentators	Dusty Rhodes
Interviewer	Gene Okerlund
Ring announcers	David Penzer
Ring announcers	Michael Buffer
Referees	Randy Eller
Referees	Jimmy Jett
Referees	Nick Patrick

All the pre-PPV matches took place live on WCW Main Event. As per the pre-match stipulations, Johnny B. Badd's victory resulted in him winning Diamond Dallas Page's remaining lottery money of $6.6 million for the Diamond Doll, as well as retaining her services as a valet.

In his "I Respect You" Strap Match against The Taskmaster, Pillman shouted "I respect you, bookerman!", breaking kayfabe, before leaving the ring.

In the WCW World Heavyweight Championship match, Ric Flair pinned Randy Savage after Miss Elizabeth turned on Savage by allowing Flair to hit him with one of her high heel shoes.

== Results ==
No.	Results	Stipulations	Times
1^{ME}	The Road Warriors (Road Warrior Animal and Road Warrior Hawk) defeated Bunkhouse Buck and Dick Slater by pinfall	Tag team match	02:07
2^{ME}	Hugh Morrus defeated Chris Kanyon by pinfall	Singles match	02:28
3^{ME}	Big Bubba Rogers and VK Wallstreet defeated Craig Pittman and Joey Maggs by pinfall	Tag team match	02:14
4^{ME}	Jim Duggan vs. Loch Ness (with Jimmy Hart and The Taskmaster) ended in a double disqualification	Singles match	—
5	The Nasty Boys (Brian Knobbs and Jerry Sags) defeated the Public Enemy (Johnny Grunge and Rocco Rock) by pinfall	Street Fight	07:49
6	Johnny B. Badd (c) (with the Diamond Doll) defeated Diamond Dallas Page by pinfall	Singles match for the WCW World Television Championship	14:59
7	Sting and Lex Luger (c) defeated Harlem Heat (Booker T and Stevie Ray) by pinfall	Tag team match for the WCW World Tag Team Championship	11:49
8	Konnan (c) defeated One Man Gang by pinfall	Singles match for the WCW United States Heavyweight Championship	07:27
9	The Taskmaster defeated Brian Pillman	"I Respect You" Strap match	00:59
10	Arn Anderson vs. The Taskmaster ended in a no-contest by pinfall	"I Respect You" Strap match	03:45
11	Sting and Lex Luger (c) vs. the Road Warriors (Road Warrior Animal and Road Warrior Hawk) ended in a double countout	Tag team match for the WCW World Tag Team Championship	13:55
12	Ric Flair (with Woman) defeated Randy Savage (c) (with Miss Elizabeth) via pinfall	Steel cage match for the WCW World Heavyweight Championship	19:00
13	Hulk Hogan defeated The Giant (with Jimmy Hart and The Taskmaster) by escaping the cage	Steel cage match	15:04
(c) / – the champion(s) heading into the match; ME / – the match was broadcast prior to the pay-per-view on Main Event
