= SuperBrawl VII =

1997 World Championship Wrestling pay-per-view event

- Promotional poster featuring Lex Luger, Buff Bagwell, Rick Steiner, Scott Steiner and Scott Norton
- Promotion: World Championship Wrestling
- Date: February 23, 1997
- City: Daly City, California
- Venue: Cow Palace
- Attendance: 13,324
- Buy rate: 275,000
- Tagline(s): The BIG ONE will hit SAN FRAN when the BIG BOYS play Get Ready For The Rumble...

Pay-per-view chronology
| ← Previous; Souled Out | Next → Uncensored |

SuperBrawl chronology
| ← Previous; VI | Next → VIII |

SuperBrawl VII was the seventh SuperBrawl professional wrestling pay-per-view (PPV) event produced by World Championship Wrestling (WCW). The event took place on February 23, 1997 from the Cow Palace in Daly City, California. The show was billed as from nearby San Francisco.

Twelve matches were contested at the event, including two dark matches. In the main event, Hollywood Hogan retained his WCW World Heavyweight Championship against Roddy Piper. In other prominent matches, Lex Luger and The Giant defeated The Outsiders (Scott Hall and Kevin Nash) to win the WCW World Tag Team Championship, Chris Benoit defeated The Taskmaster in a San Francisco Death match, and in the opening bout, Syxx defeated Dean Malenko to win the WCW Cruiserweight Championship.

== Storylines ==
The event featured wrestlers from pre-existing scripted feuds and storylines. Wrestlers portrayed villains, heroes, or less distinguishable characters in the scripted events that built tension and culminated in a wrestling match or series of matches.

== Event ==
Other on-screen personnel
| Role: | Name: |
|---|---|
| Commentators | Tony Schiavone |
| Commentators | Bobby Heenan |
| Commentators | Dusty Rhodes |
| Commentators | Mike Tenay |
| Interviewer | Gene Okerlund |
| Ring Announcer | David Penzer |
| Ring Announcer | Michael Buffer |
| Referees | Nick Patrick |
| Referees | Mickey Jay |
| Referees | Scott Dickinson |
| Referees | Mark Curtis |

Syxx pinned Dean Malenko to win the WCW World Cruiserweight Championship after hitting him with the title belt. Eddy Guerrero interfered late in the match and tried to stop Syxx from hitting Malenko, but inadvertently caused Malenko to be hit.

Buff Bagwell was disqualified when the nWo rushed the ring after a Diamond Cutter by Diamond Dallas Page.

Jeff Jarrett pinned Steve McMichael after hitting him with a briefcase thrown to him by Debra. As a result of this victory, Jarrett was allowed to join the Four Horsemen.

Lex Luger did not come down to the ring for the WCW World Tag Team Championship match until late in the match after The Giant was powerbombed by Kevin Nash. Nash submitted to the Torture Rack, followed by the Giant pinning Scott Hall after a chokeslam.

The three way dance was supposed to be a 4 team elimination match between The Steiner Brothers, Public Enemy, Faces of Fear and Harlem Heat but the Steiners were (kayfabe) injured in a car accident caused by NWO members Kevin Nash, Scott Hall and Syxx (in reality stuntmen were used to play the Steiners in the footage of the car accident) and match was changed to a three way dance match with Public Enemy beating both teams.

Hollywood Hogan pinned Roddy Piper after Randy Savage interfered by breaking up a submission and giving Hogan brass knuckles to strike Piper with. Piper was originally awarded the decision by submission with a sleeper hold after Hogan failed to respond after having his arm raised three times, but referee Mark Curtis restarted the match after Hogan was ruled to have had his foot under the ropes. Hogan, however, clearly did not have his feet under the ropes when his hand fell the third time; Savage was supposed to pull Hogan under the ropes but did so too late. Savage and Hogan then attacked Piper post-match, followed by Savage turning heel and joining the nWo.

== Aftermath ==
Eric Bischoff stripped Luger and Giant of the tag team titles the next night on Nitro due to Luger not getting a proper medical clearance before Bischoff left the previous week's Nitro.

== Results ==
| No. | Results | Stipulations | Times |
|---|---|---|---|
| 1^{D} | Hugh Morrus defeated Joe Gomez | Singles match | 05:25 |
| 2^{D} | Ultimate Dragon defeated Pat Tanaka | Singles match | 04:53 |
| 3 | Syxx defeated Dean Malenko (c) | Singles match for the WCW Cruiserweight Championship | 12:02 |
| 4 | Konnan, La Parka and Villano IV defeated Juventud Guerrera, Super Caló and Ciclope | Six-man tag team match | 09:51 |
| 5 | Prince Iaukea (c) defeated Rey Mysterio, Jr. | Singles match for the WCW World Television Championship | 08:56 |
| 6 | Diamond Dallas Page defeated Buff Bagwell by disqualification | Singles match | 09:46 |
| 7 | Eddie Guerrero (c) defeated Chris Jericho | Singles match for the WCW United States Heavyweight Championship | 12:02 |
| 8 | The Public Enemy (Rocco Rock and Johnny Grunge) defeated Harlem Heat (Booker T and Stevie Ray) (with Sister Sherri) and The Faces of Fear (Meng and The Barbarian) | Three-Way Dance | 07:43 |
| 9 | Jeff Jarrett defeated Steve McMichael (with Debra McMichael) | Singles match | 08:12 |
| 10 | Chris Benoit (with Woman) defeated The Taskmaster (with Miss Jacquelyn and Jimmy Hart) | San Francisco Death match | 08:35 |
| 11 | Lex Luger and The Giant defeated The Outsiders (Kevin Nash and Scott Hall) (c) (with Syxx) | Tag team match for the WCW World Tag Team Championship | 08:53 |
| 12 | Hollywood Hogan (c) (with Ted DiBiase and Vincent) defeated Roddy Piper | Singles match for the WCW World Heavyweight Championship | 10:59 |
(c) / – the champion(s) heading into the match; D / – this was a dark match
