= SuperBrawl IV =

1994 World Championship Wrestling pay-per-view event

- Promotional poster featuring Ric Flair and Big Van Vader
- Promotion: World Championship Wrestling
- Date: February 20, 1994
- City: Albany, Georgia
- Venue: Albany Civic Center
- Attendance: 7,600
- Buy rate: 110,000
- Tagline: There Is No Escape From the Revenge and Rage In the Thundercage!

Pay-per-view chronology
| ← Previous; Starrcade | Next → Spring Stampede |

SuperBrawl chronology
| ← Previous; III | Next → V |

SuperBrawl IV was the fourth SuperBrawl professional wrestling pay-per-view (PPV) event produced by World Championship Wrestling (WCW). The event took place on February 20, 1994 from the Albany Civic Center in Albany, Georgia. This event, along with SuperBrawl Revenge, was one of only two SuperBrawls never released on home video.

The main event was a Thundercage match, in which Ric Flair defeated Big Van Vader to retain the WCW World Heavyweight Championship, with The Boss as special guest referee.

== Event ==
Other on-screen personnel
| Role: | Name: |
|---|---|
| Commentator | Tony Schiavone |
| Commentator | Bobby Heenan |
| Referee | Randy Anderson |
| Referee | Nick Patrick |
| Interviewer | Gene Okerlund |
| Ring announcer | Gary Michael Cappetta |
| Ring announcer | Michael Buffer |

Jimmy Garvin replaced the injured Michael Hayes in the match against Johnny B. Badd. After the match, Garvin attacked Badd and gave him the 9-1-1.

== Results ==
| No. | Results | Stipulations | Times |
|---|---|---|---|
| 1 | Harlem Heat (Kole & Kane) defeated Thunder and Lightning | Tag team match | 09:47 |
| 2 | Jim Steele defeated The Equalizer | Singles match | 06:31 |
| 3 | Terry Taylor defeated Diamond Dallas Page (with Diamond Doll) | Singles match | 11:45 |
| 4 | Johnny B. Badd defeated Jimmy Garvin (with Michael Hayes) | Singles match | 10:48 |
| 5 | Lord Steven Regal (c) (with Sir William) defeated Arn Anderson | Singles match for the WCW World Television Championship | 29:54 |
| 6 | Cactus Jack and Maxx Payne defeated The Nasty Boys (Brian Knobbs and Jerry Sags) (c) by disqualification | Tag team match for the WCW World Tag Team Championship | 12:37 |
| 7 | Sting, Brian Pillman and Dustin Rhodes defeated Steve Austin, Rick Rude and Paul Orndorff (with Col. Robert Parker) | Thundercage match | 14:36 |
| 8 | Ric Flair (c) defeated Big Van Vader (with Harley Race) by submission | Thundercage match for the WCW World Heavyweight Championship with The Boss as special guest referee | 11:32 |
(c) / – the champion(s) heading into the match
