= SuperBrawl III =

1993 World Championship Wrestling pay-per-view event

- Promotional poster featuring Sting and Big Van Vader
- Promotion: World Championship Wrestling
- Date: February 21, 1993
- City: Asheville, North Carolina
- Venue: Asheville Civic Center
- Attendance: 6,500
- Buy rate: 95,000
- Tagline: Witness History In The Making At The Biggest Event Of The Year!

Pay-per-view chronology
← Previous; WCW/New Japan Supershow III	Next → Slamboree

SuperBrawl chronology
← Previous; II	Next → IV

SuperBrawl III was the third SuperBrawl professional wrestling pay-per-view (PPV) event produced by World Championship Wrestling (WCW). It took place on February 21, 1993 from the Asheville Civic Center in Asheville, North Carolina in the United States.

The main event was a White Castle of Fear Strap match between Big Van Vader and Sting. Vader's WCW World Heavyweight Championship was not on the line in the main event as the match was not sanctioned by WCW. This event marked the return of Ric Flair to WCW and Davey Boy Smith's WCW debut. The event also featured The Great Muta versus Barry Windham for the NWA World Heavyweight Championship.

This was the first WCW pay-per-view with Eric Bischoff as executive producer, though he continued to operate as an announcer on television and his new role was only mentioned in the closing credits of the show.

== Storylines ==
The event featured wrestlers from pre-existing scripted feuds and storylines. The Heavenly Bodies (Tom Prichard and Stan Lane) replaced the Wrecking Crew due to an agreement by WCW Executive Vice President Bill Watts and Smoky Mountain Wrestling commissioner Bob Armstrong on an earlier episode of Main Event. The Heavenly Bodies' SMW Tag Team Championship was not on the line, making it a non-title match. Watts quit before the event so there was no mention of him and the only mention of his successor was in the closing credits. Chris Benoit and 2 Cold Scorpio fought to draws in January 1993.

== Event ==
Other on-screen personnel
Role:	Name:
Commentators	Tony Schiavone
Commentators	Jesse Ventura
Interviewer	Eric Bischoff
Ring announcer	Gary Michael Cappetta
Referees	Mike Atkins
Referees	Nick Patrick
Referees	Randy Anderson

Maxx Payne was disqualified in his match against Dustin Rhodes after he pulled the referee into Rhodes to attempt to break an abdominal stretch and throwing Rhodes over the top rope. Payne replaced the injured Ron Simmons.

After Barry Windham's victory over The Great Muta, Ric Flair attempted to place the NWA World Heavyweight Championship belt around Windham's waist, but Windham refused to let him.

== Aftermath ==
After Bill Watts left WCW, the working agreement between Smoky Mountain Wrestling and WCW ended, SMW would begin working with the WWF in talent exchanges, Jim Cornette would begin appearing on WWF programming as the advisor to Yokozuna (along with Mr. Fuji), and SMW wrestlers appeared on WWF's pay per view programs. Barry Windham and Ric Flair would begin a feud over the NWA World title, which would culminate in Flair winning his 10th (and last) NWA World title in July 1993 at Beach Blast; WCW would leave the NWA permanently in September.

== Home Video Release and Streaming ==
The event was released on VHS in the United Kingdom by Turner Home Entertainment in late 1993. The event was edited down to two hours and the first match was not included on the tape. In order for it to pass with a certificate of PG, the British Board of Film Classification insisted that cuts were made.

In 2014, the event was included on the WWE's streaming platform the WWE Network as part of its launch and remained on the service until the platform closed in 2026. As of August 2026, the event is no longer available to stream and has not been added to any of the streaming platforms that the WWE has agreements with.

== Results ==
No.	Results	Stipulations	Times
1	The Hollywood Blonds (Steve Austin and Brian Pillman) defeated Erik Watts and Marcus Bagwell	Tag team match	16:34
2	2 Cold Scorpio defeated Chris Benoit	Singles match	19:59
3	Davey Boy Smith defeated Bill Irwin	Singles match	05:49
4	Cactus Jack defeated Paul Orndorff	Falls Count Anywhere match	12:17
5	The Rock 'n' Roll Express (Ricky Morton and Robert Gibson) defeated The Heavenly Bodies (Tom Prichard and Stan Lane) (with Jim Cornette)	Tag team match	12:52
6	Dustin Rhodes (c) defeated Maxx Payne by disqualification	Singles match for the WCW United States Heavyweight Championship	11:28
7	Barry Windham defeated The Great Muta (c) (with Hiro Matsuda)	Singles match for the NWA World Heavyweight Championship	24:10
8	Big Van Vader (with Harley Race) defeated Sting	White Castle of Fear Strap match	20:54
(c) / – the champion(s) heading into the match
