= Harlem Heat =

Professional wrestling tag team

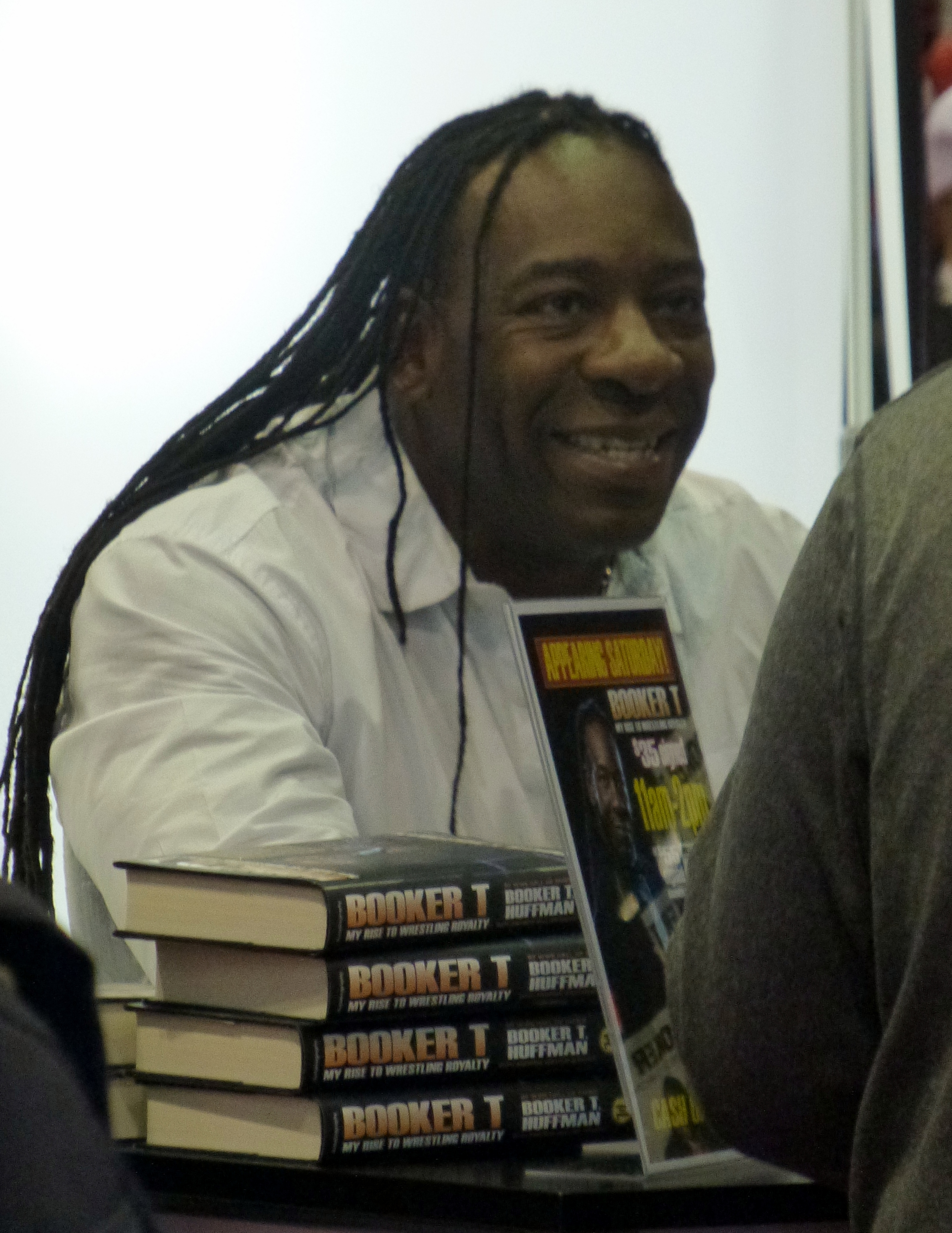
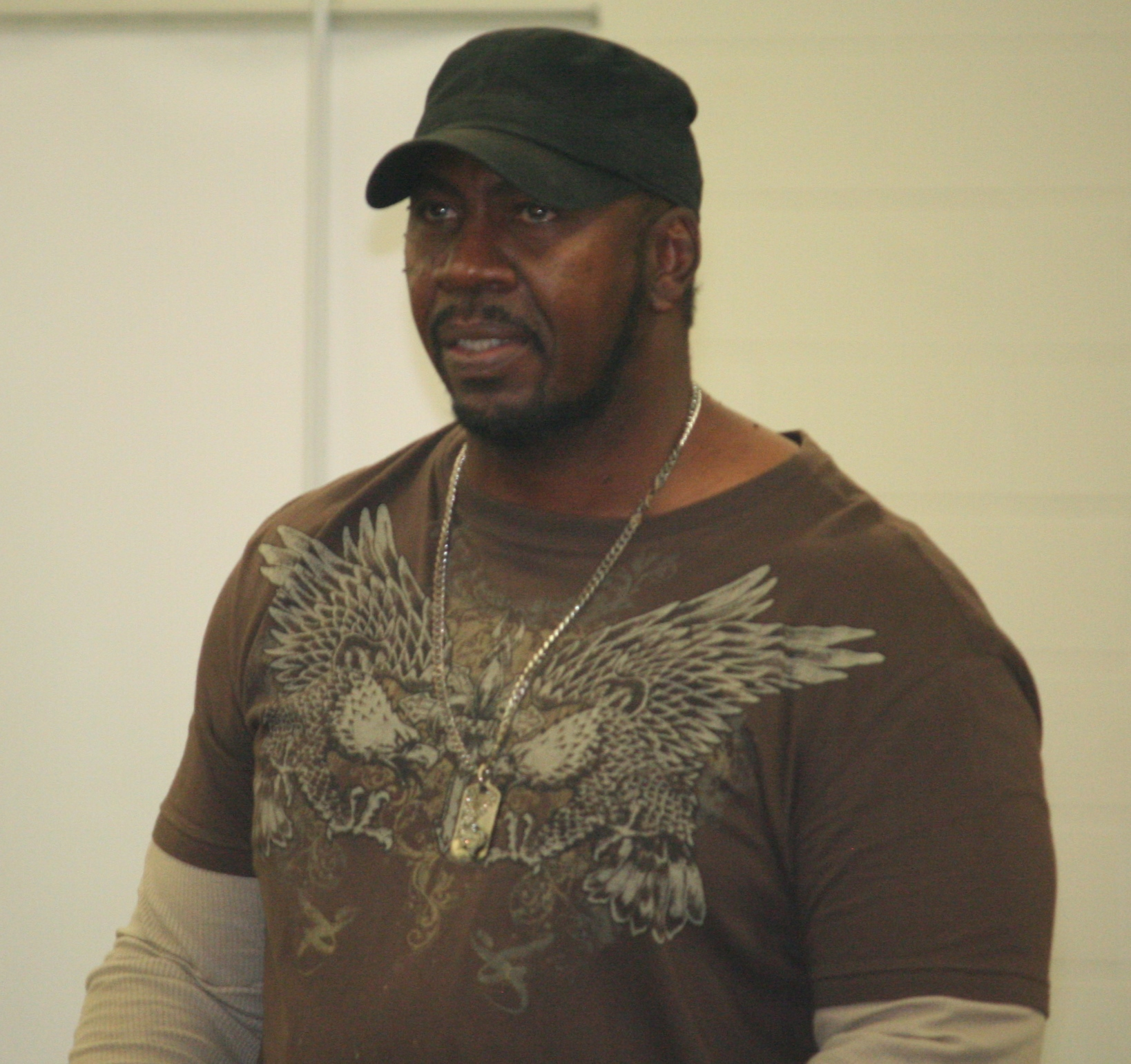
- Booker T (left) and Stevie Ray (right)

Tag team
- Name(s): Harlem Heat; The Huffman Brothers; The Ebony Experience; The Ghetto Blasters; The Black Bombers; Harlem Heat 2000
- Members: Booker T/Kole; Stevie Ray/Kane
- Manager(s): Midnight; Sister Sherri; Jacquelyn
- Billed heights: 6 ft 3 in (1.91 m) – Booker T 6 ft 5 in (1.96 m) – Stevie Ray
- Combined billed weight: 545 lb (247 kg; 38.9 st)
- Hometown: Houston, Texas
- Billed from: 110th Street in Harlem, New York
- Debut: 1989
- Disbanded: 2015
- Years active: 1989–2000; 2015
- Trained by: Scott Casey; Ivan Putski

Harlem Heat was a professional wrestling tag team composed of two brothers, Booker and Lash Huffman (better known as Booker T and Stevie Ray). The team achieved their greatest success in World Championship Wrestling (WCW), where they won the WCW World Tag Team Championship a record ten times. Kevin Powers of WWE remarked: "When debating the greatest tag team in WCW history, Harlem Heat and The Steiner Brothers are more or less interchangeable."

Harlem Heat was inducted into the WWE Hall of Fame on April 6, 2019, as part of the 2019 class.

== History ==
=== Western Wrestling Alliance (1989–1991) ===
Booker T and Stevie Ray started to team together as The Huffman Brothers in Ivan Putski's Western Wrestling Alliance after a brief feud with each other. Soon after, the WWA ceased operating and the brothers started touring the Texas independent circuit.

=== Global Wrestling Federation (1992–1993) ===
The Huffman Brothers caught the eye of Skandor Akbar who was involved with the Global Wrestling Federation out of Dallas in 1992. The brothers were repackaged as the "Ebony Experience" and quickly rose through the ranks of the GWF tag team division under the guidance of Gary Hart, defeating Skandor Akbar's "Goodfellows" ("Gorgeous" Gary Young and Steve Dane) for the GWF Tag Team Championship on July 31, 1992. Their first run with the GWF tag title lasted only a week before they were defeated by the Blackbirds (Iceman King Parsons and Action Jackson). Booker and Stevie Ray made a comeback and defeated the cheating birds in September.

The second run with the title lasted a bit longer than a week, but was ultimately short lived as the Rough Riders (Black Bart and Johnny Mantell) won the gold on October 23. The title loss was forced due to Booker T suffering a knee injury that needed surgery and time off to recover. In early 1993 the Ebony Experience returned to action and started to chase the Bad Breed (Axl Rotten and Ian Rotten) who had won the titles while Booker T recovered. On February 26 the Ebony Experience won their third GWF Tag Team championship, becoming the only team to hold that title three times. Their third run with the title proved to be their longest as they held them until May 7 where Guido Falcone and Vito Mussolini (known as the Sicilian Stallions) defeated them for the titles. Not long after this Booker T and Stevie Ray left the GWF, having signed with World Championship Wrestling (WCW).

=== World Championship Wrestling (1993-2001) ===
==== Early years (1993–1994) ====
On June 22, 1993, the brothers debuted in WCW as the tag team Harlem Heat, with Booker renamed Kole and Lash renamed Kane. They were then billed from Harlem. Originally, they were supposed to be a pair of prisoners won in a card game by manager Col. Rob Parker, but was changed due to racial sensitivity based on their look, coming out to the ring in wrist and foot shackles. Harlem Heat debuted on WCW television by defeating local wrestlers Dave Hart and Mike Thor on the August 14 episode of WorldWide. On the August 21 episode of Saturday Night, Harlem Heat became villains by teaming with Sid Vicious to defeat Ron Simmons, 2 Cold Scorpio and Marcus Alexander Bagwell in a six-man tag team match. Harlem Heat made their pay-per-view debut at Fall Brawl on September 19 by teaming with Vader and Sid Vicious against Sting, Davey Boy Smith, Dustin Rhodes, and The Shockmaster in the WarGames match. They lost the match but were over as villains because of the caliber of fan favorites they wrestled.

Harlem Heat suffered their first televised loss in WCW against Sting and Dustin Rhodes on the September 25 episode of Saturday Night. Shortly after, Harlem Heat ended their association with Col. Robert Parker. The following month, at Halloween Havoc, Harlem Heat teamed with The Equalizer against The Shockmaster, Ice Train and Charlie Norris in a losing effort. At Battlebowl, Kane was randomly partnered with Charlie Norris in a Lethal Lottery qualifying match against Big Van Vader and Cactus Jack in a losing effort. Kane was paired with Davey Boy Smith against Road Warrior Hawk and Rip Rogers in a losing effort.

At SuperBrawl IV on February 20, 1994, Harlem Heat defeated Thunder and Lightning. Shortly after, Harlem Heat engaged in a feud with Marcus Alexander Bagwell and 2 Cold Scorpio which led to the two teams exchanging wins with one another. Harlem Heat were soon joined by Ron Simmons while Ice Train joined Bagwell and Scorpio. Both teams traded wins in six-man tag team matches. In July, Kole and Kane changed their names back to Booker T and Stevie Ray.

==== World Tag Team Champions (1994–1996) ====
At Clash of the Champions XXIX, Sensuous Sherri joined Harlem Heat as their manager by helping them in defeating The Nasty Boys (Brian Knobbs and Jerry Sags). On the December 3 episode of WorldWide, Harlem Heat renamed her Sister Sherri. The alliance with Sherri led to Harlem Heat being elevated in the tag team division. Harlem Heat faced Nasty Boys in a rematch at Starrcade, which Harlem Heat lost via disqualification.

On December 8, Harlem Heat defeated Stars and Stripes (The Patriot and Marcus Alexander Bagwell) to win their first WCW World Tag Team Championship, which aired on the January 14, 1995 episode of Saturday Night. Harlem Heat retained the titles against Stars and Stripes in a rematch at Clash of the Champions XXX. They continued their feud with the Nasty Boys, leading to a title defense against Nasty Boys at SuperBrawl V. Harlem Heat retained the titles via a disqualification win. At Uncensored, Harlem Heat lost to Nasty Boys in a non-title falls count anywhere match. Harlem Heat finally lost the titles to Nasty Boys at Slamboree.

Harlem Heat became tweeners and entered a feud with Col. Parker's Stud Stable of "Dirty" Dick Slater and Bunkhouse Buck. Harlem Heat defeated the team of Slater and Buck at The Great American Bash. On the June 24 episode of WorldWide, Harlem Heat defeated Nasty Boys to win their second World Tag Team Championship after interference by The Blue Bloods (Lord Steven Regal and Earl Robert Eaton). The title win was taped on May 3. At Bash at the Beach, Harlem Heat retained the titles against Nasty Boys and Blue Bloods in a triangle match. Harlem Heat lost the tag team titles to Slater and Buck on the July 22 episode of Saturday Night, thanks to interference from Parker. At Clash of the Champions XXXI, Harlem Heat and Sherri defeated Slater, Buck and Parker in a six-person tag team match. As a result, Harlem Heat earned a tag team title shot against Slater and Buck at Fall Brawl. Harlem Heat defeated Slater and Buck with help from Nasty Boys to win their third World Tag Team Championship. Parker and Sherri were carrying on a love affair and Parker eventually left the Stud Stable in favor of the Heat to be with Sherri.

Just one night later, on Monday Nitro, Harlem Heat lost the tag team titles to The American Males (Marcus Alexander Bagwell and Scotty Riggs). On the October 28 episode of Saturday Night, Harlem Heat defeated American Males to win their fourth World Tag Team Championship. This title change was taped on October 11. Harlem Heat lost the titles to Lex Luger and Sting on the January 22, 1996 episode of Nitro. Harlem Heat unsuccessfully challenged Luger and Sting for the titles at SuperBrawl VI. At Uncensored, Booker T teamed with Sting to defeat The Road Warriors (Hawk and Animal) in a street fight to earn Harlem Heat, a title shot against Luger and Sting on the April 22 episode of Nitro, which Harlem Heat lost. On the June 24 episode of Nitro, Harlem Heat defeated Luger and Sting and Steiner Brothers (Rick and Scott) in a triangle match to win their fifth World Tag Team Championship.

Harlem Heat lost the tag team titles to Steiner Brothers at a live event on July 24. However, just three days later on July 27, Harlem Heat defeated Steiner Brothers to win their sixth World Tag Team Championship. Harlem Heat successfully defended the titles against Steiner Brothers at Hog Wild. At Clash of the Champions XXXIII, Harlem Heat retained the titles against Steiner Brothers and the team of Sting and Lex Luger in a triangle match as the match ended in a no contest when the referee Nick Patrick abruptly ended the match due to The Outsiders (Kevin Nash and Scott Hall) just appearing at ringside. At Fall Brawl, Harlem Heat successfully defended the titles against Nasty Boys.

On the September 23 episode of Nitro, Harlem Heat lost the titles to Public Enemy (Rocco Rock and Johnny Grunge). On the October 5 episode of Saturday Night, Harlem Heat defeated Public Enemy in a rematch to win their seventh World Tag Team Championship. This match was taped on October 1. Harlem Heat lost the titles to The Outsiders at Halloween Havoc.

==== Managerial changes (1996–1997) ====
On the November 9 episode of Saturday Night, Harlem Heat became full-fledged faces when they fired Col. Robert Parker and beat him up to rescue Sister Sherri. They briefly feuded against Parker's newest team The Amazing French Canadians, defeating them in a match at World War 3. At Clash of the Champions XXXIV on January 21, 1997, Harlem Heat defeated the team of The Renegade and Joe Gomez.

Soon after, Harlem Heat took on The Public Enemy and The Faces of Fear (Meng and The Barbarian) in a three-way dance at SuperBrawl VII, which Public Enemy won. The following month, at Uncensored, Harlem Heat defeated Public Enemy in a Texas Tornado match. At Spring Stampede, both members of Harlem Heat competed in a four corners match for a WCW World Heavyweight Championship title match. Lex Luger won the match.

Shortly after, Harlem Heat got involved in a feud with the Steiner Brothers over contention for the World Tag Team Championship, leading to a match between the two teams at The Great American Bash, which Harlem Heat won by disqualification after New World Order (nWo) member Vincent interfered by attacking them. On the July 7 episode of Nitro, they fired Sherri after her interference backfired, costing them a match against Public Enemy. Vincent's repeated interferences in matches resulted in Harlem Heat beginning a feud with nWo's Vicious and Delicious (Buff Bagwell and Scott Norton), leading to a match between the two teams at Road Wild. During this match, Harlem Heat added Jacqueline as their new manager, who helped them in defeating Vicious and Delicious. After that, Harlem Heat resumed their feud with the Steiner Brothers, losing to them at Fall Brawl.

==== Split and reunion (1997–1999) ====
By the end of 1997, Booker began transitioning into the singles competition as he won the World Television Championship, while continuing to team with Ray as well. However, in 1998, Harlem Heat quietly disbanded. Harlem Heat reunited once on the June 15 episode of Nitro, where they unsuccessfully challenged Sting and Kevin Nash for the World Tag Team Championship. During this time, Stevie began attacking Chris Benoit on several occasions, against whom Booker had recently competed in a best-of-seven series to determine the #1 contendership for the World Television Championship. This led to Harlem Heat reuniting once more on the June 29 episode of Nitro, where they lost to Benoit and Steve McMichael.

On the July 13 episode of Nitro, Ray claimed the World Television Championship and began defending it by saying that Booker gave him the power of attorney to defend the title as Booker got injured due to being attacked by Bret Hart, the previous night at Bash at the Beach. Soon after, Ray joined the nWo. Despite being on opposite sides they managed to peacefully co-exist (despite Booker expressing dismay at Stevie for joining the nWo).

In the summer of 1999, Booker began feuding with The Jersey Triad. On the July 29 episode of Thunder, the Jersey Triad triple-teamed Booker during his match against the Triad member Bam Bam Bigelow until Stevie made the save. After the match, Booker convinced Stevie to tear up the nWo shirt and reform Harlem Heat. On the August 2 episode of Nitro, Harlem Heat competed in its first match as a team in over a year as the duo defeated Bigelow and Kanyon, with assistance from Chris Benoit. This led to Harlem Heat challenging Bigelow and Kanyon for the World Tag Team Championship at Road Wild. Harlem Heat won the match to begin their record-setting eighth tag team title reign.

Harlem Heat lost the titles to Barry and Kendall Windham on the August 23 episode of Nitro. The following month, at Fall Brawl, Harlem Heat defeated the Windhams in a rematch to win their ninth World Tag Team Championship and retained the titles against Windhams on the September 27 episode of Nitro.

On the October 18 episode of Nitro, Harlem Heat lost the tag team titles to The Filthy Animals members Konnan and Rey Mysterio Jr. However, six days later, at Halloween Havoc, Misterio was stripped off the title due to injury and the vacant title was put up in a three-way dance pitting Harlem Heat against Filthy Animals' Konnan and Kidman and The First Family (Hugh Morrus and Brian Knobs). Harlem Heat defeated the two teams to win their record-setting tenth and final World Tag Team Championship. However, Harlem Heat lost the titles to Konnan and Kidman, the following night on Nitro.

==== Harlem Heat 2000 (1999–2000) ====
Harlem Heat 2000

Stable
- Name(s): Harlem Heat 2000; Harlem Heat Inc.
- Leader: Stevie Ray
- Members: Big T Cassius
- Manager: J. Biggs
- Debut: January 16, 2000
- Disbanded: June 23, 2000
- Years active: 2000

On the November 1 episode of Nitro, Creative Control (Gerald and Patrick) arrived in WCW and cost Stevie Ray, his match against Buff Bagwell in the tournament for the vacant WCW World Heavyweight Championship by attacking Bagwell causing Ray to get disqualified. However, Booker T rescued Ray from Creative Control. Later that night, Creative Control interfered in Booker's tournament match against Jeff Jarrett, allowing Jarrett to win. The following week, on Nitro, Ray was suspended by "Powers That Be". Booker challenged Jarrett and Creative Control to a handicap Harlem Street Fight, which ended in a no contest after a female bodybuilder named Midnight made her WCW debut to rescue Booker. Midnight would rescue Booker again from Jarrett and Creative Control, after they cost him, his match against Scott Hall at Mayhem. She subsequently joined Harlem Heat.

Stevie returned from suspension on the November 29 episode of Nitro to rescue Midnight from an assault by Curt Hennig. Dissension within the team began over Midnight on the December 13 episode of Nitro, where Harlem Heat competed against The Revolution (Dean Malenko, Perry Saturn and Asya) in a handicap match, which they lost when Booker tended to an injured Midnight while ignoring Ray, leaving him to get pinned by Malenko. Booker liked the addition of Midnight while Stevie neglected her help and started arguing with Booker. This difference within the group would cause Harlem Heat and Midnight to lose a six-person tag team match to Curt Hennig and Creative Control at Starrcade.

On the December 27 episode of Nitro, Harlem Heat lost a match to Lash LeRoux and Midnight in a Lethal Lottery tournament for the vacant World Tag Team Championship, after Ray grew tired of Booker's affection towards Midnight and delivered Slapjacks to Booker, LeRoux and Midnight and walked out on the match. Ray eventually challenged Midnight to a match on the January 6, 2000 episode of Thunder that would decide whether she would stay with Harlem Heat. After being defeated with a surprise small package, Stevie Ray turned on both Booker T and Midnight by attacking both of them.

At Souled Out, a match took place between Booker and Stevie, which ended in a disqualification when Big T made his WCW debut and attacked Booker. Stevie would form the new Harlem Heat with Big T and begin feuding with Booker and Midnight. Ray and Big T referred their new team as Harlem Heat 2000. On the January 31 episode of Nitro, Harlem Heat acquired J. Biggs as their manager, who prevented Booker from using the "Rap Sheet" entrance music and "T" in his name. At SuperBrawl 2000, Booker lost the rights to the Harlem Heat name, the "Rap Sheet" and the "T" surname after being pinned by Big T after a distraction by Cassius (formerly known as 4x4 from The No Limit Soldiers). From then on, Booker T would simply be referred to as "Booker" and began using a cartoonish theme called "The Woodchuck's Game" before eventually returning to his old moniker of G.I. Bro as the leader of Misfits in Action.

Stevie Ray subsequently formed Harlem Heat, Inc. with Big T, J. Biggs and Kash. Harlem Heat 2000 continued to feud with Booker as they lost to Booker and Kidman at Uncensored. Harlem Heat 2000 did not find much success as they lost most of their matches including the semifinal match in the tournament for the vacant World Tag Team Championship against the eventual tournament winners Shane Douglas and Buff Bagwell at Spring Stampede and a handicap match against Terry Funk for the Hardcore Championship on the May 10 episode of Thunder. The team ultimately disbanded in June 2000 when Big T was released by WCW. This would result in Booker getting the "Rap Sheet" theme song and "T" name back.

The original Harlem Heat duo of Booker T and Stevie Ray had one final reunion in WCW on the July 19 episode of Thunder where they defeated Jeff Jarrett and Rick Steiner in a tag team match. This marked their final time teaming in WCW before the promotion closed.

=== The Final Heat ===
On February 21, 2015, Booker T and Stevie Ray reunited as Harlem Heat for one last match at Booker T's promotion, Reality of Wrestling's The Final Heat event, where they defeated The New Heavenly Bodies for the ROW Tag Team Championship. The titles were vacated a month later without them ever defending them.

== Championships and accomplishments ==
- Cauliflower Alley Club
  - Tag Team Award (2018)
- Global Wrestling Federation
  - GWF Tag Team Championship (3 times)
- Pro Wrestling Illustrated
  - Tag Team of the Year (1995, 1996)
  - Ranked No. 62 of the 100 best tag teams of the PWI Years in 2003
- Reality of Wrestling
  - ROW Tag Team Championship (1 time)
- World Championship Wrestling
  - WCW World Tag Team Championship (10 times)
  - WCW World Television Championship (7 times) – Booker T (6), Stevie Ray (1)
- WWE
  - WWE Hall of Fame (Class of 2019)
