= Miss Elizabeth =

American professional wrestling manager (1960–2003)

- Elizabeth c. 1988
- Born: Elizabeth Ann Hulette; November 19, 1960; Frankfort, Kentucky, U.S.
- Died: May 1, 2003 (aged 42); Marietta, Georgia, U.S.
- Burial place: Frankfort Cemetery
- Education: University of Kentucky
- Occupations: Professional wrestling manager; professional wrestler; professional wrestling announcer
- Spouses: Randy Savage (m. 1984; div. 1992); Cary Lubetsky (m. 1997; div. 1999)
- Partner(s): Lex Luger (1999–2003; her death)
- Professional wrestling career
- Ring name: Miss Elizabeth
- Billed height: 5 ft 4 in (163 cm)
- Billed weight: 115 lb (52 kg)
- Billed from: Louisville, Kentucky
- Debut: 1983 (as TV announcer); 1985 (as manager)
- Retired: 2003

Elizabeth Ann Hulette (November 19, 1960 – May 1, 2003), best known in professional wrestling as Miss Elizabeth, was an American professional wrestling manager, occasional professional wrestler, and professional wrestling TV announcer. She gained international fame from 1985 to 1992 in the World Wrestling Federation (WWF, now WWE) and from 1996 to 2000 in World Championship Wrestling (WCW), in her role as the manager of wrestler "Macho Man" Randy Savage, as well as other wrestlers of that period.

== Early life ==
Hulette was born in Frankfort, Kentucky. She graduated from Franklin County High School and the University of Kentucky with a degree in communications.

== Professional wrestling career ==
=== International Championship Wrestling (1983–1984) ===
While working at a gym, she met Randy Poffo, who wrestled under the ring name "Macho Man" Randy Savage. They married in December 1984.

Later Hulette worked at International Championship Wrestling shows as a TV announcer where Poffo was employed.

=== World Wrestling Federation (1985–1992) ===
==== Managing Randy Savage (1985–1988) ====
On June 17, 1985, "Macho Man" Randy Savage debuted in the World Wrestling Federation. At that time, the WWF featured an angle in which all the managers in the promotion competed to offer their services to Savage. During a match on July 30, 1985, in Poughkeepsie, New York, several managers were at ringside in hopes that he would name one of them as his new manager. After the match, Savage thanked the managers for their consideration and then asked that his new manager come to ringside. An attractive, unnamed woman then came down to the ring, and announcer Jesse Ventura remarked, "She must be some sort of movie star," referring to her glamorous sex appeal. It was later revealed that her name was "Miss Elizabeth". Elizabeth's WWF debut was taped on July 30, 1985, and aired on the August 24, 1985 edition of WWF Prime Time Wrestling. From that point on, she was the manager of Randy Savage. On February 8, 1986, at the Boston Garden she was in Savage's corner as he defeated Tito Santana for the WWF Intercontinental Championship.

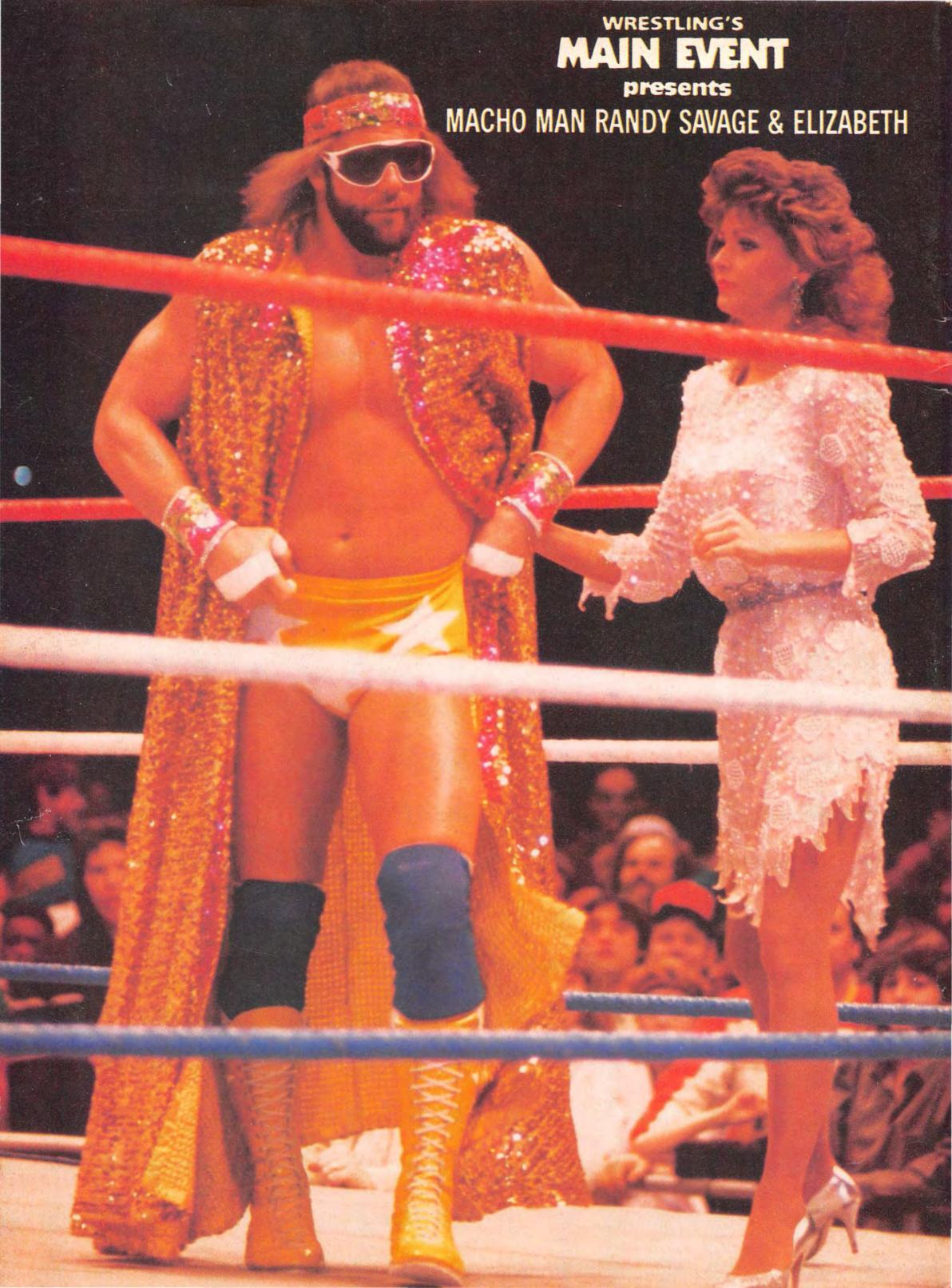
Elizabeth (right) and Savage (left), circa 1987

Miss Elizabeth's first major angle was during Savage's feud with George "The Animal" Steele in 1986. In the angle, Steele fell in love with Elizabeth, angering Savage and leading to a series of grudge matches between him and Steele. Their feud was one of the WWF's most popular of the 1980s; it carried on for more than a year, thanks to the feral Steele's continued innocent crush on Elizabeth.

After "injuring" Ricky Steamboat's larynx, Savage lost his WWF Intercontinental Championship to Steamboat at WrestleMania III on March 29, 1987. Steamboat later lost the title to The Honky Tonk Man, whose insistence that he was "the greatest Intercontinental Champion of all time" instigated a challenge from Savage, the former champion. In their match, which aired on Saturday Night's Main Event XII in September 1987, Honky shoved Elizabeth to the mat before assaulting Savage with a guitar. Elizabeth ran backstage and persuaded Hulk Hogan to rescue Savage, running off Honky and his allies, Bret "The Hitman" Hart and Jim "The Anvil" Neidhart. Throughout the Savage-Honky feud, a key point was Honky's claim that Elizabeth secretly wanted him more than Savage. In several of their matches, Honky would try to corner Elizabeth, although Savage would always beat him back. In other Savage-Honky matches, a woman named "Peggy Sue" (usually Sherri Martel, or a dressed-up Jimmy "Mouth of the South" Hart) would harass Elizabeth at ringside, creating an advantage for Honky. At the 1987 Slammy Awards, Honky named Elizabeth "Woman of the Year," but the honor was only to harass her and anger Savage; Savage quickly ran Honky off.

Miss Elizabeth (center) celebrating with Hulk Hogan and Randy Savage after Savage won the WWF World Heavyweight Championship at WrestleMania IV

In February 1988, Hulk Hogan, who had been the champion and foundation upon which the WWF's popularity was built, lost the WWF World Heavyweight Championship to André the Giant. André then sold the belt to the "Million Dollar Man" Ted DiBiase due to an arrangement they had prior to the match. President Jack Tunney declared that the title cannot be forfeited to another individual. A tournament was held at WrestleMania IV to declare a new champion, which Savage won, pinning DiBiase in the finals. Throughout mid-1988, Elizabeth accompanied Savage to ringside for his lengthy series of title defenses against DiBiase.

==== Mega Powers (1988–1989) ====
At the inaugural SummerSlam event in August 1988, Savage and Hulk Hogan - dubbed the "Mega Powers" - teamed up against the Mega Bucks (André the Giant and Ted DiBiase) with Jesse "The Body" Ventura. Most of the pre-match build-up centered on Elizabeth, who was at the peak of her popularity. The tease for the match was that if things got bad, Elizabeth, billed as the secret weapon of The Mega Powers, was going to wear an "itsy bitsy teeny weeny bikini" under her fancy clothes. Towards the end of match, André and DiBiase were in control, so Elizabeth got up on the apron and ripped her skirt off to reveal her panties, which distracted André, DiBiase, and Ventura, giving Savage and Hogan time to recover after being knocked out of the ring.

Elizabeth became the catalyst in the uneasy – and ultimate breakup of – the Savage–Hogan relationship, particularly due to Hogan's overfriendly, overprotective attitude toward Elizabeth. At his behest, Elizabeth accompanied Hogan to ringside for several matches during the fall of 1988, including matches against King Haku, Akeem, and Bad News Brown that aired on Saturday Night's Main Event XVII. In the match against Akeem, Elizabeth's safety was endangered by Akeem and his allies, Slick and Akeem's tag team partner, Big Boss Man when they began stalking Elizabeth. During a climactic point in the match where Hogan was being brutally beaten by Akeem, Big Boss Man grabbed Elizabeth and placed her in handcuffs, stopped only when Savage ran out to make the save; although he checked on Elizabeth's well-being, Savage appeared to be unconcerned about Hogan.

Concurrent with the Mega Powers' feud with the Twin Towers was Savage's feud with Bad News Brown. That feud started when Brown, during a guest appearance on "The Brother Love Show" talk segment, alleged that Elizabeth was "doing favors" for WWF President Jack Tunney (implying she wanted to protect Savage and his WWF World Heavyweight Championship reign from Brown). Savage quickly got revenge against Brown.

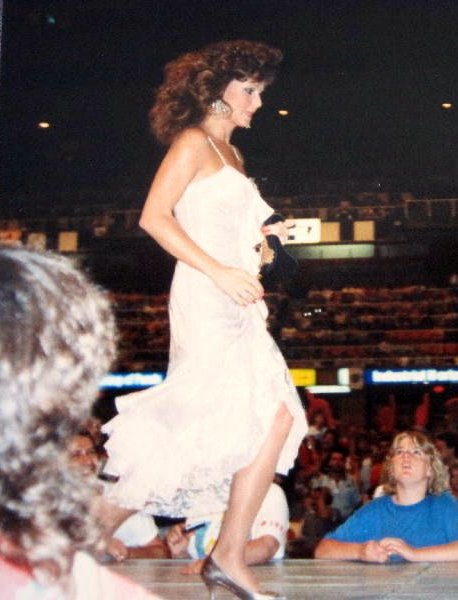
Miss Elizabeth played a central role in the storyline between WrestleMania IV and WrestleMania V.

The tension between Hogan and Savage continued to build at the Royal Rumble in January 1989 when Hogan "accidentally" eliminated Savage. An angered Savage confronted Hogan in the ring, causing Elizabeth to rush to the ring to play the peacemaker. After the match was over, Jesse Ventura interviewed Savage and claimed he could see problems between the Mega Powers, something Savage unconvincingly denied. By The Main Event II, aired live on February 3, 1989, Savage could no longer contain his growing anger toward Hogan. The sequence of events began when Akeem threw Savage onto Elizabeth, who was knocked unconscious from the force of the blow. Hogan immediately ran to Elizabeth's aid and, distraught and fearing the worst, carried her to the backstage area for medical attention; the match continued in the meantime, with Akeem and Big Boss Man working Savage over. Elizabeth eventually regained consciousness and asked Hogan to return to the ring. However, Savage, furious over being left to take a beating, slapped Hogan in the face and, after having some choice words, left him to face the Twin Towers alone (Hogan went on to win the match single handed). Following the match, Savage and Hogan had a loud verbal argument backstage while Elizabeth was receiving medical attention, which culminated with Savage striking Hogan with the championship belt and beating him down, thus splitting the Mega Powers.

The dissolution of the Mega Powers led Hogan to challenge Savage for the WWF World Heavyweight Championship in the main event of WrestleMania V in April 1989. In the build-up to the event, Savage appeared in a series of televised promos accusing Hogan of "lusting after Elizabeth" with video footage of past incidents, edited in a context to push Hogan as a jealous, sore heel. Hogan responded by defending his behavior (with more complete footage from the same incidents, to push him as the face). After weeks of speculation as to whose corner she would stand in at WrestleMania V, Elizabeth announced she would stand in a "neutral" corner. During the Hogan-Savage match, Elizabeth got in the way of both wrestlers several times and was eventually sent away from ringside; Hogan went on to win Savage's WWF World Heavyweight Championship. Following WrestleMania V, Savage ended his partnership with Miss Elizabeth, adopting Sensational Sherri as his new manager.

==== Rivalry with Randy Savage (1989–1990) ====
For the remainder of 1989, Elizabeth's appearances were sporadic. She continued to mainly appear on the house show circuit managing Hulk Hogan in his matches with Randy Savage from April 1989 through October 1989. Elizabeth appeared at SummerSlam 1989, managing Hogan and Brutus Beefcake as they headlined the show against Savage and Zeus (accompanied by Sensational Sherri); Elizabeth, who rarely became physical with other wrestlers beforehand, tripped Sherri to prevent her from interfering at a critical point in the match. Elizabeth closed out 1989 managing Jim Duggan in his matches against Randy Savage and appearing on the Brother Love Show during house shows with Sherri Martel in November and December 1989. In addition to her appearances at ringside, Elizabeth also briefly co-hosted WWF Wrestling Spotlight with Vince McMahon.

After Savage and Sherri began a heated feud with "The American Dream" Dusty Rhodes and Sapphire near the end of 1989, Miss Elizabeth joined forces with Rhodes and Sapphire at WrestleMania VI in April 1990, where the two couples were engaged in the WWF's first mixed tag team match. When Sherri attempted to help Savage double-team Rhodes, Miss Elizabeth grabbed Sherri by the hair. While the two women faced off, Sapphire took advantage of the situation, kneeling down behind Sherri just as Miss Elizabeth pushed her. Sherri lost her balance and gave Sapphire enough advantage to pin Sherri for the win. Elizabeth continued to appear on the house show circuit with Dusty Rhodes and Sapphire from May 1990 until August 1990 in mixed tag team matches against Randy Savage and Sherri Martel, with Savage and Sherri adding Brother Love to their corner to counteract Elizabeth. From August 1990, she took a hiatus from appearing at WWF events.

==== Reunion with Randy Savage (1991–1992) ====
Miss Elizabeth did not appear on WWF television until WrestleMania VII in March 1991, where she was in the audience for a retirement match between Savage and Ultimate Warrior. After Savage lost the match, Sherri began beating and kicking the defeated Savage until Elizabeth entered the ring and defended Savage by grabbing Sherri by the hair and throwing her out of the ring. Savage punctuated the reunion by holding down the ring ropes for Elizabeth after years of her doing it for him.

On June 17, 1991, during the taping of WWF Superstars of Wrestling in an in-ring segment with Gene Okerlund announcing, Savage proposed to Miss Elizabeth, which she accepted. The couple then held a heavily promoted on-air wedding billed as "the Match Made in Heaven" in August 1991, at SummerSlam 1991 (in actuality, the couple had married on December 30, 1984). At the wedding reception, Elizabeth opened a gift package containing a live snake, which frightened her; newly turned-heel Jake "The Snake" Roberts and the Undertaker crashed the reception and attacked Savage. This started a feud between Roberts and Savage, where Elizabeth quickly figured prominently. The first high-profile Savage-Roberts match was on December 3, 1991, at the Tuesday in Texas pay-per-view event, where, after Savage gained a pinfall victory, Roberts beat down Savage, then forced Elizabeth to beg him to stop the beating. Apparently dissatisfied with her begging, Roberts grabbed her by the hair and slapped her across her face. On the February 8, 1992 Saturday Night's Main Event XXX, Savage defeated Roberts. After the match Roberts, with a steel chair in tow, was waiting in the backstage area for Elizabeth and Savage to come through the curtain after a match. Roberts was about to strike Elizabeth with the chair, but Undertaker stopped him. This started Undertaker's feud with his former ally.

In early 1992, WWF Champion Ric Flair began to brag that he dated Elizabeth before Savage met her. Flair's tagline was, "She was mine before she was yours." He showed photos of himself with Elizabeth in casual situations, which were later printed in an issue of WWF Magazine. It was later revealed that the photos were in fact pictures of Savage and Elizabeth, which Flair had doctored. Flair, with Mr. Perfect as his "executive consultant", said that they were going to show a nude photo of Elizabeth on the screen at WrestleMania VIII, although this did not occur. Nonetheless, Flair's claims set up his WrestleMania VIII match with Savage. During the match on April 5, 1992, Elizabeth made her way to ringside, against the wishes of WWF officials. After Savage pinned Flair to win the WWF Championship, an angry Flair cornered Elizabeth and forcibly began to kiss her; Elizabeth slapped Flair away, and Savage began beating Flair until ring officials separated them.

Elizabeth's final WWF appearance took place at UK Rampage on April 19, 1992, during an overseas tour of England; in that match, Savage pinned Shawn Michaels after Elizabeth, who had earlier been sent backstage, returned to prevent Sherri's interference on Michaels' behalf. The Savage–Michaels match from England was aired on WWF Prime Time Wrestling in June; the publication of the actual Savage-Elizabeth photos in WWF Magazine came at about that same time. In August 1992, she and Savage divorced. After the decree was finalized late that summer, Savage issued a statement that was printed in WWF Magazine revealing that he and Elizabeth were no longer together and thanking the fans for their support through the years. The publication of Savage's statement marked, at the time, a rare acknowledgement of the wrestlers' private lives for both the WWF and its flagship publication. Savage continued with the WWF for two more years, and except for the statement in WWF Magazine, his divorce from Elizabeth was neither referred to nor figured into any of Savage's future feuds. Elizabeth retired from wrestling and disappeared from the spotlight for a few years.

=== Broadcasting career and ESPN (1993-1995) ===
Following her 1992 departure from the World Wrestling Federation (WWF) and her divorce from Randy Savage, Hulette largely withdrew from the public eye to pursue a career in mainstream broadcasting. Utilizing her degree in communications from the University of Kentucky, she relocated to South Florida and transitioned into sports journalism.

In 1993 Hulette resurfaced on national television as a color commentator and correspondent for ESPN, specifically covering offshore powerboat racing. Her work primarily aired under the network's motorsports anthology banner, ESPN SpeedWorld. Throughout 1993–1995, she provided analysis and conducted pier-side interviews for various sanctioned events, including the Offshore Powerboat Tour (OPT).

During this period, Hulette intentionally distanced herself from the "Miss Elizabeth" persona, appearing under her real name. However, her presence on the network was frequently noted by wrestling publications such as the Wrestling Observer Newsletter, which tracked her transition from "The First Lady of Wrestling" to a professional broadcaster. This tenure ended in late-1995 when she was contacted by World Championship Wrestling (WCW) to return to the industry, leading to her debut at Clash of the Champions XXXII in January 1996.

=== World Championship Wrestling (1996–2000) ===
==== The Four Horsemen (1996) ====
On January 23, 1996, Miss Elizabeth returned to wrestling as manager for Randy Savage and Hulk Hogan at Clash of the Champions XXXII. Three weeks later, on February 11, 1996, Elizabeth turned on Randy Savage by helping Ric Flair defeat him at SuperBrawl VI and then became Flair's co-manager in the Four Horsemen along with Woman.

At Fall Brawl '96: War Games in September 1996, "Team WCW" - represented by Flair, Arn Anderson, Lex Luger, and Sting - lost to the New World Order (nWo) in a WarGames match. After the match, Randy Savage came to the ring to attack Hogan, only to be beaten down by the nWo. After Elizabeth came to the ring to plead with nWo leader Hulk Hogan to stop, she was spray painted by Hogan, who then spat on her and Savage.

==== New World Order (1996–1999) ====
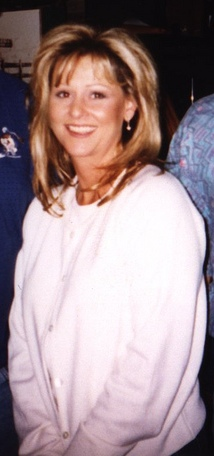
Miss Elizabeth in 1998 after a taping of WCW Monday Nitro.

On the September 30, 1996, episode of WCW Monday Nitro, Elizabeth joined the nWo. Despite joining the nWo, Elizabeth seemed to still care deeply for her ex-husband, and eventually returned to his side when he too joined the nWo in February 1997. During much of 1997, Randy Savage and Elizabeth feuded with Diamond Dallas Page and Kimberly Page.

In May 1998 at Slamboree, Elizabeth joined nWo Wolfpac. In June 1998, she parted ways with Savage once again by joining nWo Hollywood. Then, she accompanied Eric Bischoff on his way to the ring for the next few months, and derided Savage. Savage coldly reminded her that he "got over her a long time ago" and did not need her.

On the January 4, 1999 episode of Nitro, Elizabeth was seen talking to police detectives. According to the storyline, she claimed that Goldberg was stalking her and that he even accosted her by the water cooler. She then filed charges against Goldberg. Goldberg was arrested later that night for aggravated stalking and taken into custody by police. However, later that night, Elizabeth admitted that she was lying. As it turned out, Elizabeth was a pawn for the nWo so that Goldberg would be unable to have his scheduled title match with Kevin Nash later that night. Due to Goldberg's apparent absence, the returning Hulk Hogan took Goldberg's title shot in the match.

Elizabeth remained part of the New World Order until taking a leave of absence from WCW in April 1999.

==== Managing Lex Luger (1999–2000) ====
In September 1999, Elizabeth returned to WCW television as the manager of Lex Luger. Lex Luger, who was accompanied by Elizabeth at this time to ringside for single matches, was supposed to get ready for the tag team match against Konnan and Rey Mysterio Jr. with Miss Elizabeth's hair on the line and Rey Mysterio Jr.'s mask on the line at SuperBrawl IX with Kevin Nash as his tag team partner. However, on the February 18, 1999 edition of WCW Thunder, at the E-Center in Salt Lake City, Utah, a limo pulled up and was driving along with Rey Mysterio Jr. with Lex Luger and Elizabeth inside. As Elizabeth and Lex Luger were getting out of the limo, Rey Mysterio Jr. grabbed the door and slammed it into Lex Luger's biceps, injuring him in the process. Lex Luger was immediately replaced by Scott Hall as Kevin Nash's tag team partner for the tag team match at Superbrawl IX.

She then took time off from the road to be with Lex Luger during his recovery from a biceps injury.

After Lex Luger recovered from his biceps injury, Elizabeth would make her return to WCW programming on the September 27, 1999 edition of WCW Monday Nitro. Towards the end of 1999, Elizabeth became much more physically involved in the action than she had ever been. Elizabeth wrestled in her first official match against Meng that ended in a draw. Her new vicious side would be ever so apparent at Starrcade 1999 when she struck Sting with his own baseball bat.

In February 2000, Elizabeth managed the short-lived partnership between Lex Luger and Ric Flair. The three of them were known as Team Package. Shortly thereafter, Team Package went their separate ways as they fought various members of The New Blood.

Elizabeth engaged in short-lived feuds with Vince Russo and Kimberly Page. On May 8, 2000, Elizabeth fought Daffney to a no contest. Elizabeth worked with Kimberly Page for the remainder of May 2000.

Elizabeth's final WCW appearance was on the May 29, 2000 edition of WCW Monday Nitro and Elizabeth quietly left World Championship Wrestling on August 17, 2000, when her contract with WCW expired.

=== Later career (2002) ===
Elizabeth was advertised to make her first wrestling appearance on television since her departure from WCW in 2000 during the World Wrestling All-Stars tour of Europe in November 2002 and December 2002 alongside Luger. She accompanied Luger on the tour overseas, but did not appear on a single show. Elizabeth never made another wrestling appearance on television after she left WCW. Lex Luger ended up winning and losing the WWA World Heavyweight Championship in matches with Sting during the tour.

== Other media ==
Miss Elizabeth appeared as a Manager in MicroLeague Wrestling.

Miss Elizabeth appeared in four WCW video games: WCW/nWo Revenge, WCW Nitro, WCW/nWo Thunder and WCW Backstage Assault.

She has also appeared in WWE video games as an NPC and made a cameo in the 1989 arcade game WWF Superstars, WWE 2K14, WWE 2K16 and WWE 2K24 WWE 2K25 WWE 2k26 as a selectable manager.

== Personal life ==
Elizabeth Hulette met Randy Savage at a gym in Lexington in 1982, and they married in 1984. They divorced in 1992. Elizabeth briefly married Cary Lubetsky, a South Florida attorney, on December 6, 1997. The wedding was held at the Cuban Hebrew Temple in Miami Beach. The marriage was short lived, as the couple soon separated and were officially divorced on April 19, 1999.

Elizabeth and Lex Luger stayed together as a couple after leaving WCW in 2000. After her departure from wrestling, Hulette began working at the front desk at Main Event Fitness in Marietta, Georgia, a gym Luger owned for years after he and Steve Borden (Sting) opened it during their wrestling heyday.

On April 19, 2003, Elizabeth was involved in a domestic dispute with Luger, who allegedly struck her in the garage of their townhouse in Marietta, Georgia. Cobb County police found Elizabeth with two bruised eyes, a bump on her head, and a cut lip. Luger was charged with a misdemeanor count of battery and released on $2,500 bond. Two days later, Luger was arrested for driving under the influence after rear-ending another car while driving his Porsche. According to the report on the arrest, Luger had slurred speech and bloodshot eyes and could not locate his driver's license. Luger had a 9mm Luger handgun in the car. Elizabeth was a passenger in the vehicle, and was sent home in a taxicab. Luger was also driving with a suspended license for not appearing in court on March 5, 2003, for a hearing on a previous offense – driving with expired tags and having no proof of vehicle insurance.

=== Death ===
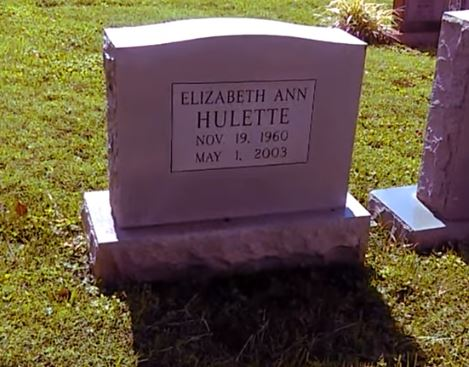
Hulette's grave

On May 1, 2003, in Marietta, Georgia, Luger called 9-1-1 to report that Hulette was not breathing. She did not respond to mouth-to-mouth resuscitation, and paramedics rushed her to the WellStar Kennestone Hospital Emergency Room, where she was pronounced dead at age 42. A medical examiner listed the cause of death as "acute toxicity", brought on by a mix of painkillers and vodka. Her death was ruled an accident. Hulette was buried at Frankfort Cemetery in her hometown of Frankfort, Kentucky.

== Awards and accomplishments ==
- World Wrestling Federation
  - Slammy Award (1 time)
    - Woman of the Year (1987)

== See also ==
- List of premature professional wrestling deaths
- "The Match Made in Heaven", an episode of the documentary series Dark Side of the Ring about Miss Elizabeth and Randy Savage
