= Outsiders (professional wrestling) =

Professional wrestling tag team

Tag team
- Members: Kevin Nash; Scott Hall
- Name(s): Oz and Diamond Studd; Diesel and Razor Ramon; The Outsiders; New World Order; The Band; The Wolfpac (with Sean Waltman); Kevin Nash and Scott Hall; Hall and Nash
- Billed heights: 6 ft 10 in (2.08 m) (Nash); 6 ft 7 in (2.01 m) (Hall)
- Combined billed weight: 615 lb (279 kg); 328 lb (149 kg) (Nash); 287 lb (130 kg) (Hall)
- Debut: September 21, 1991
- Disbanded: March 14, 2022 (Hall's death)
- Years active: 1991, 1995, 1996–1999; 2002; 2004–2005; 2008–2010; 2014–2015 (reunions)

The Outsiders were a professional wrestling tag team consisting of Kevin Nash and Scott Hall, best known for their appearances in World Championship Wrestling (WCW). They also teamed in the World Wrestling Federation (WWF), Total Nonstop Action Wrestling (TNA), and Pro Wrestling ZERO1-MAX.

Hall and Nash were seven-time World Tag Team Champions. They were occasionally joined by Sean Waltman, forming a trio most frequently known as The Wolfpac. The three men were all real life friends and part of the backstage wrestling group known as "The Kliq".

== History ==
=== World Championship Wrestling (1991) ===
Hall (wrestling as "Diamond Studd") and Nash (wrestling as "Oz") wrestled for the first time as a tag team on September 21, 1991 losing to Tom Zenk & Big Josh on WCW Power Hour.

=== World Wrestling Federation (1995, 1996) ===
Hall (wrestling as "Razor Ramon") and Nash (wrestling as "Diesel") first teamed in the World Wrestling Federation on March 2, 1995, facing Jeff Jarrett and Shawn Michaels in a series of matches at house shows and in dark matches. They teamed once more during the "WWF in High Gear" tour of Germany in April 1995, facing Jarrett and Sycho Sid. Hall and Nash reformed their tag team in January 1996, facing Jarrett and Sycho Sid/Hunter Hearst Helmsley at a series of house shows.

=== Return to WCW (1996–1998, 1999) ===
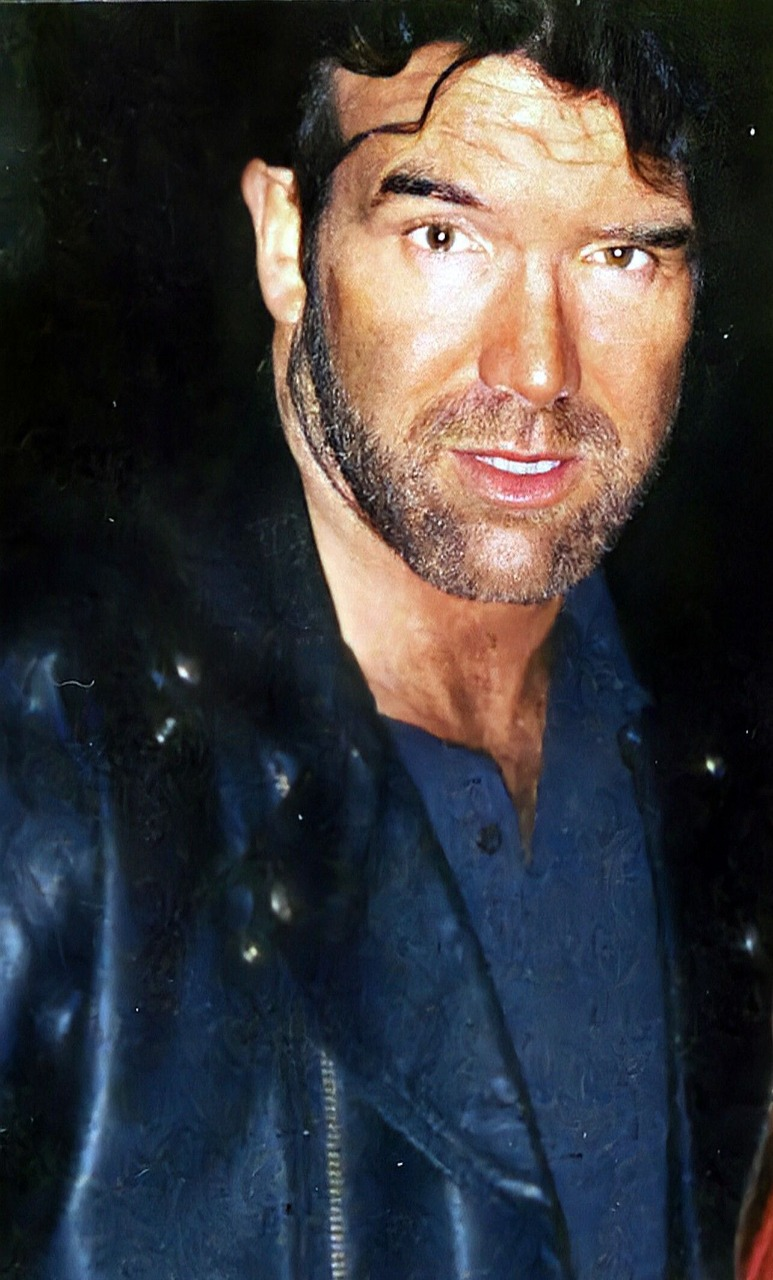
Scott Hall c. late 1990s

"The Outsiders" were formed in 1996 when Hall and Nash returned to WCW after leaving the WWF. In the storyline, Hall, better known to fans at the time as Razor Ramon, led an invasion, appearing on WCW programming and insinuating that he was doing so under orders from his WWF employers and warning that he would soon be joined by others. He was joined by former WWF World Heavyweight Champion Nash, then best known as Diesel, two weeks later. A lawsuit from the WWF caused Eric Bischoff to ask The Outsiders point-blank if they worked for the WWF, which both emphatically denied. Their angle was the precursor to the villainous turn of Hulk Hogan and the formation of the New World Order (nWo), a major wrestling storyline that dominated WCW programming for several years afterwards.

The Outsiders captured the WCW World Tag Team Championship six times, first winning them from Harlem Heat (Booker T and Stevie Ray) at Halloween Havoc in October 1996. They dropped the title to the Steiner Brothers (Rick and Scott Steiner) at the 1997 Souled Out event, only to have WCW President Eric Bischoff reverse the decision on the next night's episode of Nitro. A near repeat of these events occurred the next month when Hall and Nash lost to the team of Lex Luger and The Giant at SuperBrawl VII, with Bischoff again abusing his power and quickly returning the championship to The Outsiders. The Outsiders became the cornerstones of the nWo and were popular with the fans despite being villains and feuding with fan favorites such as the Steiners and Lex Luger and The Giant. During promos, Hall would occasionally refer to The Outsiders as "The People's Choice" in recognition of their popularity.

In October 1997, fellow nWo and former Kliq member Syxx began substituting for a legitimately injured Nash, teaming with Hall to defend the championship on numerous occasions. The Outsiders and Syxx claimed they were doing this under "Wolfpac Rules" (a nod to the storyline existence of the Freebird Rule), also referring to themselves as The Wolfpac. Hall and Syxx eventually lost the title to The Steiner Brothers on October 13, 1997. The Outsiders and Steiners traded the title back and forth at both televised and non-televised events until Scott Steiner turned on his brother, joining the nWo and giving the title to Hall and Nash.

In May 1998 at Slamboree, The Outsiders were scheduled to defend the tag team titles against Sting and The Giant during a storyline in which the nWo was splitting into two warring factions. Hall turned on Nash during this match, costing them the title as well as dissolving the tag team, having chosen to join nWo Hollywood as opposed to the splinter faction Nash formed under The Wolfpac name. Hall's personal problems began to affect him and while Nash was his enemy, he still showed obvious care and concern for his estranged friend. The split team faced each other once later in the year where Nash repeatedly hit powerbombs on the inebriated Hall into unconsciousness, before leaving the ring to take a countout loss.

They reunited in early 1999, and stayed a team even after the nWo once again fell apart. After an aimless couple of months (Nash lost a retirement match), of just wandering around being pests to the other talent, they won the WCW World Tag Team Championship one last time in December 1999. It did not last, however, as Hall legitimately no-showed an event, thus the title was stripped from them, and the team was dissolved.

=== Return to WWF/E (2002) ===
In 2002, with the WWF owning WCW and its trademarks, The Outsiders and Hollywood Hulk Hogan reformed as the nWo in a WWF ring. The reunion was short lived as Hogan became a fan favorite at WrestleMania X8, Nash got legitimately injured, and Hall and X-Pac (the former Syxx, who rejoined the group shortly after Hogan's fan favorite turn) were both released from WWE just months after their arrival.

=== Total Nonstop Action Wrestling (2004–2005, 2010) ===
In late 2004 and early 2005, Hall and Nash teamed again, this time in TNA as part of a trio with fellow nWo 2000 alum Jeff Jarrett, but they were not allowed to use the name New World Order or The Outsiders, as WWE now owns the trademarks of both names. In October 2004, vignettes began airing, where Nash and Hall appeared to be on different sides in the upcoming NWA World Heavyweight Championship match between Jeff Jarrett and Jeff Hardy at Victory Road. Hall and Nash debuted on November 7 at Victory Road interfering in the ladder match for the NWA World Heavyweight Championship and in the end revealed they were on the same side by both attacking Hardy with guitars. After the match, Nash cut a promo on how they were better than the entire TNA locker room and challenged anyone to oppose them. A.J. Styles accepted, but was beaten down by the new stable. Randy Savage then made his debut in TNA, entering the Impact Zone to face off with the villains.

On Impact! the following week, Nash proclaimed the trio of himself, Hall, and Jarrett to be called "The Kings of Wrestling". Hall, Nash and Jarrett began wearing goofy Elvis-style jumpsuits and sunglasses, and wreaked havoc on multiple episodes of Impact! before being challenged and defeated by Savage, Styles and Hardy in a six-man tag team match at Turning Point. After the six-man tag match, Savage was next in line for a title shot (having pinned the champion, Jarrett, in the match), but in light of him leaving the company, Director of Authority Dusty Rhodes appointed a three-way match at Final Resolution to achieve a number one contender to the NWA World Heavyweight Championship. The first two competitors announced were Diamond Dallas Page and Monty Brown. The third was Kevin Nash, Jarrett's ally in The Kings of Wrestling. The group hit a period of friction, as Nash openly competed for the title shot at Final Resolution (losing when Page dumped him over the top rope), before earning a shot at Jarrett's NWA World Heavyweight Championship at Against All Odds, where Nash was unsuccessful in his attempt at the title, after which The Kings of Wrestling parted ways.

Hall resurfaced on the Impact! show prior to Genesis in 2007, teasing as Sting's partner for the TNA World Heavyweight Championship tag team match. At Turning Point, Hall and Nash were supposed to have their first tag team match together in a TNA ring since 2004, also teaming with Samoa Joe to take on the Angle Alliance, but Hall was replaced in the match by Eric Young, who eventually won the match with his team. Hall told TNA management he did not show at the event because of health problems.

On the January 4, 2010, live, three hour, Monday night episode of Impact!, Hall and Sean Waltman (the former Syxx and X-Pac) returned to TNA and quickly reformed their alliance with Nash. This incarnation would soon be officially known as The Band. Nash and Hall were advertised to make their return as a tag team on January 17 at Genesis, but at the event Hall was replaced by Waltman, who teaming up with Nash went on to lose a tag team match against Beer Money, Inc. (James Storm and Robert Roode). The reunion did not last long, as on the February 4 episode of Impact!, Hall and Waltman turned on Nash. However, this betrayal was a ruse, as at Destination X, Nash turned on his new partner Eric Young and re-joined Hall and Syxx-Pac, who, with their victory, now had contracts with the company. Upon winning these new contracts the trio began using an instrumental version of the nWo Wolfpac theme, as well as occasionally calling themselves The Wolfpac once again, though their official name remained The Band.

At Lockdown, Hall and Nash made their return to tag team action in a steel cage match, where they were defeated by Team 3D. On May 4 at the tapings of the May 13 episode of Impact!, after TNA World Tag Team Champion Matt Morgan had been attacked by Samoa Joe, Nash cashed in his "Feast or Fired" contract, teaming with Hall, and pinned him to win the TNA World Tag Team Championship. The Band's newest member, Eric Young, was also given a share of the Championship and the three defended the titles under the Freebird rule. At the June 14 tapings of Impact!, The Band was stripped of the TNA World Tag Team Championship due to Hall's legal problems.

=== Other appearances ===
Hall and Nash main evented Dream Stage Entertainment's May 8, 2004 Hustle 3 pay-per-view, losing to the team of Shinya Hashimoto and Naoya Ogawa.

On August 10, 2008, Nash and Hall teamed up again as The Outsiders at Bloodymania II to defeat Thomaselli Brothers (Brandon and Vito Thomaselli). Nash also positioned himself as a member of the Juggalo World Order, which Hall was already a part of.

On the March 21, 2009, The Outsiders teamed for Great Lakes Championship Wrestling against New Age Outlaws in what was the first nWo vs. D-Generation X match. Nash walked out on Scott Hall, and the two were set to face off later in June.

=== WWE nWo reunions ===
Starting in 2014, Hall and Nash would take part in several nWo reunion segments together in WWE.

On the August 11, 2014 episode of Raw, aired on Hulk Hogan's 61st birthday, featured Scott Hall and Kevin Nash as guests. The two shared a moment with Hogan, revealing an nWo shirt hidden under his "Hulkamania" shirt. They were interrupted by Brock Lesnar, who told Hogan, "Party's over, grandpa". Lesnar backed out of the ring when confronted by John Cena, his opponent at SummerSlam.

On the January 19, 2015 episode of Raw, Hall, Nash, and X-Pac came out as the nWo for Hall's survey segment. They were interrupted by The Ascension, who made reference to them as the Wolfpac in an antagonistic promo before getting beaten down by the nWo, the APA, and the New Age Outlaws. On March 29 at WrestleMania 31, The Outsiders returned with Hogan to assist their long-time rival Sting in his WrestleMania debut match against Triple H. The nWo helped to fight off X-Pac and The New Age Outlaws, who had interfered on behalf of Triple H as D-Generation X. Shawn Michaels later joined Triple H's side, turning the match in his favor, which Triple H would go on to win. This would be the Outsiders' final appearance as a team, as Hall died on March 14, 2022.

== Championships and accomplishments ==
- Pro Wrestling Illustrated
  - Tag Team of the Year (1997)
  - Ranked No. 40 of the 100 best tag teams of the PWI Years in 2003
- Total Nonstop Action Wrestling
  - TNA World Tag Team Championship (1 time) – with Eric Young^{1}
- World Championship Wrestling
  - WCW World Heavyweight Championship (2 times) – Kevin Nash
  - WCW United States Heavyweight Championship (2 times) – Scott Hall
  - WCW World Television Championship (1 time) – Scott Hall
  - WCW World Tag Team Championship (6 times) – with Syxx (1)^{2}

^{1} During their TNA World Tag Team Championship reign, Eric Young was brought in as the third member of the team and the titles were defended under the Freebird Rule.

^{2} During their fifth reign as WCW World Tag Team Champions, Nash suffered a legitimate injury, and the nWo invoked "Wolfpac Rules" and named Syxx as Hall's replacement partner.

== See also ==
- The Band
- The Diamond Exchange
- The Insiders
- The Kliq
- New World Order (nWo)
- Two Dudes with Attitudes
