= List of Silent Library episodes =

Silent Library is an American reality television series which premiered on MTV on June 15, 2009 in the United States.

== Series overview ==
Season	Episodes	Originally released	
Season	Episodes	First released	Last released
1	19	June 15, 2009	July 9, 2009
2	20	January 11, 2010	February 12, 2010
3	20	June 28, 2010	August 5, 2010
4	30	March 28, 2011	May 13, 2011

== Episodes ==
=== Season 1 (2009) ===
Episode #	Original Airdate
101 (1)	June 15, 2009
Joshua, Juan, Jordan, Matt, Zach and Rashard face the Silent Library.: Featured Challenges: Round 1: Big Bust, Milk Man, Noodle Foot; Round 2: Frenched, Rear Footing, Bird Stink Vacuum; Round 3: Seat Slip, Jack In Box, Electric Puzzle; Round 4: Turned Pig; Total: $4,100/$684 Per Player
102 (2)	June 16, 2009
Emmanuel, Steve, Brandon, Stan, Mike and Nick face the Silent Library.: Featured Challenges: Round 1: Pulled Sniff, Defective Vacuum, Passion Fish; Round 2: Lady Pants Pop, Old Man Bites Tenderly, Sushi Mixup; Round 3: Chicken Foot, Seat Slip, Hair Treat; Round 4: Shoot Off Rubber; Total: $3,100/$517 Per Player
103 (3)	June 17, 2009
Thomas, Vinnie, Brian, Beans, Dennis and Anthony face the Silent Library.: Featured Challenges: Round 1: Sour Drink, Fore Head Hoop, Problem Child; Round 2: Explode Cup, Built Body Rub, Bad Smell Cheese Cake; Round 3: Fly Swat Face, Angry Music; Round 4: Eggs Launch; Total: $3,600/$600 Per Player
104 (4)	June 18, 2009
Ricky, Ian, Rodney, Jack, Sean and Grant face the Silent Library.: Featured Challenges: Round 1: Sugar Sniff, Face Hair Tuna, Bad School Days; Round 2: Vampire Face Pop, Uncreamed, Doctor Fish; Round 3: Bra Snaps, Pest Helmet; Round 4: Down Low Piñata; Total: $3,000/$500 Per Player
105 (5)	June 19, 2009
Julian, Jose, Mike, EJ, Dan and Joey face the Silent Library.: Featured Challenges: Round 1: Fast Food Mix Up, Firing Squad, Siesta Fiesta Bonsai; Round 2: Dog Taste, Bad Milk Air, Plastic Wrap Beauty; Round 3: Smelly Mess Vase, Beard Transfer, Seat Slip; Round 4: Down Low Piñata; Total: $4,000/$667 Per Player
106 (6)	June 22, 2009
Nick, Charles, Anthony, Adam, Vinny and Sean face the Silent Library.: Featured Challenges: Round 1: Marine Slap, Not Wanted Hug, Deli Mix Up; Round 2: Troll Lick, Formal Strike, Gum Table; Round 3: Santa Lapped, Electric Puzzle, Car Wash Man; Round 4: Shoot Off Rubber; Total: $3,900/$650 Per Player
107 (7)	June 23, 2009
James, Greg, Ed, Chris, Alex and Matthew face the Silent Library.: Featured Challenges: Round 1: Defective Vacuum, Clean Tooth Fruit, Milk Man; Round 2: Sushi Mixup, Frozen Top, Terrible Towel; Round 3: Hair Treat, Little Gill Whip, Hopeful No Punch Bike; Round 4: Angry Dog; Total: $2,300/$384 Per Player
108 (8)	June 24, 2009
Joseph, Grath, Zachary, Danny, Matt and Mike face the Silent Library.: Featured Challenges: Round 1: Fish Clean, Cold Lick, Kicking Leg; Round 2: Bad Eyes Break Fast, Snack Search; Round 3: Meat Wash, Freeze Protect, Cat Stink Vacuum; Round 4: Eggs Launch; Total: $2,400/$400 Per Player
109 (9)	June 25, 2009
Matt, Cameron, Keith, John, Ben and Crazy Nick face the Silent Library.: Featured Challenges: Round 1: Not Your Tongue, Evil Masked, Kept Away; Round 2: Lady Pants Pop, Bad Taste Doll, Goat Race; Round 3: Formal Strike, Squeezed Grape, Frozen Choice; Round 4: Wedding Shoot; Total: $4,200/$700 Per Player
110 (10)	June 26, 2009
Dave, Dwayne, Rob, Virgil, Patrick and Ryan face the Silent Library.: Featured Challenges: Round 1: Cotton Spicy, Much Like Gas, Brief Pet; Round 2: Sword Fury, Bra Snaps, Dead Helmet; Round 3: Hopeful No Punch Bike, Stomach Melt, Electric Puzzle; Round 4: Angry Dog; Total: $4,000/$667 Per Player
111 (11)	June 29, 2009
Pedro, Sean, Winder, Jarrett, Greg and Michael face the Silent Library.: Featured Challenges: Round 1: Under Armed, Meat Spin, Sweet Red Corn; Round 2: Passion Fish, Head Ping, Mouth Fizzle; Round 3: Exploded Candy Drop, Dizzy Bat Lady; Round 4: Spitted Shoot; Total: $4,000/$667 Per Player
112 (12)	June 30, 2009
Greg, Rob, Jeremiah, Kervin, Wayne and Jordan face the Silent Library.: Featured Challenges: Round 1: Blind Taste, Meat Hold Up; Round 2: Power Row, Bad Taste Popcorn, Chocolate Stretch; Round 3: Hitted Rear, Booked Food, No Good Mallet; Round 4: Brief Hoist; Total: $4,100/$684 Per Player
113 (13)	July 1, 2009
Rob, Gary, David, Mark, Ben and Arthur face the Silent Library.: Featured Challenges: Round 1: Slapping Machine, Mayo Ball; Round 2: News Paper Toss, Saddle Poker, Break Fast Mix Up; Round 3: Burned Smell, Foot Bowl, Rodent Hand Snap; Round 4: Turned Pig; Total: $4,500/$750 Per Player
114 (14)	July 2, 2009
Kaitlin, Veronica, Tovah, Kate, Julie and Sara face the Silent Library.: Featured Challenges: Round 1: Floating Chew, Schooled Scratch, Bugged Feet; Round 2: Juiced Foot, Bird Stink Vacuum, Safety Car; Round 3: Rainbow Drink, Electric Puzzle, Extinguished; Round 4: Spitted Shoot; Total: $3,000/$500 Per Player
115 (15)	July 3, 2009
Alex, August, Brandon, Derek, Corey and Harshit the Silent Library.: Featured Challenges: Round 1: Firing Squad, Evil Masked, Pulled Sniff; Round 2: Cotton Spicy, Explode Cup, Head Band; Round 3: Freeze Protect, Seat Slip; Round 4: Cup Groin Surprise; Total: $2,200/$367 Per Player
116 (16)	July 6, 2009
Emmanuel, Steve, Nick, Olief, Corey and Ben face the Silent Library.: Featured Challenges: Round 1: Vampire Face Pop, Under Armed, Top Less Turn; Round 2: Mouth Fizzle, Chocolate Stretch, Suspender Strike; Round 3: Fly Swat Face, Meat Wash; Round 4: Fruit Shoot; Total: $4,000/$667 Per Player
117 (17)	July 7, 2009
Ryan, Nick, Vic, Fran, Rick and Mike face the Silent Library.: Featured Challenges: Round 1: Holiday Blend, Sticky Walk, Nose Prick; Round 2: Head Band, Dog Taste, Sad Bee; Round 3: Saddle Poker, Squeezed Grape, Old Soup; Round 4: Fruit Shoot; Total: $4,400/$734 Per Player
118 (18)	July 8, 2009
Kurt, Max, Simon, Brian, Andrew and Ben face the Silent Library.: Featured Challenges: Round 1: Marine Slap, Cleaned Boot, Gymnast Limbo; Round 2: Safety Car, Fish Snow; Round 3: Private Threading, Muffin Gun, Clothes Pin Rip; Round 4: Smash; Total: $4,400/$734 Per Player
119 (19)	July 9, 2009
Burga, Dan, Michael, Milton, Pascal and Jahmal face the Silent Library.: Featured Challenges: Round 1: Bad Taste Toothbrush, Chicken Foot, Big Bust; Round 2: Suspender Strike, Bitter Bite, Old Man Bites Tenderly; Round 3: Smelly Mess Vase, Cup Cake Choice, Beard Transfer; Round 4: Brief Hoist; Total: $4,400/$734 Per Player

=== Season 2 (2010) ===
Episode #	Original Airdate
201 (20)	January 11, 2010
Brandon, Luke, Mike, Mark, Ed and Michael face the Silent Library.: Featured Challenges: Round 1: Horse Hit, Bad Taste Pastry, Cheer Up Clown; Round 2: Tight Squeeze, Sticky Walk, Clean Breath Fondue; Round 3: Little Leg Kick, Facing Wipe, Balled Spit; Round 4: Mystery Cage; Total: $2,600/$434 Per Player
202 (21)	January 12, 2010
Jesus, Jarrett, Jeffery, Felix, John and Chris go head to head with the Silent Library.: Featured Challenges: Round 1: Too Fast Stop, Most Pressure, Shared Italian; Round 2: Private Salami, Cow Girl, Turkey Trot; Round 3: Ball Park Mix Up, Fish Row, Balled Pedal; Round 4: Stacked; Total: $3,600/$600 per player
203 (22)	January 13, 2010
Asher Roth and Justin Bieber, with a few of their friends David, Brian, Tom and Greg, as they take on the Silent Library. Guest star rapper Jim Jones.: Featured Challenges: Round 1: Return Belt, Troll Lick, Old Bags; Round 2: Give Back Ink, Stink Fruit, No Shoes Service; Round 3: Spike Seat, Surprising Rear, China Town Mix Up; Round 4: Hitted Coin; Total: $3,900/$650 Per Player
204 (23)	January 14, 2010
Megan, Lindsay, Karen, Melissa, Lauren and Jenna head in to the Silent Library.: Featured Challenges: Round 1: Spice Helmet, Bad Measure, Whipped Locks; Round 2: Internal Bust, Dish Water, Egged Head; Round 3: Bad Hair Dryer, Bad Door, Not Happy Hour; Round 4: Tiny Cake Reach; Total: $3,400/$567 Per Player
205 (24)	January 15, 2010
Chris, William, Carlos, Martin, Jonathan and Will Bill go for a ride in the Silent Library.: Featured Challenges: Round 1: Morning Cookie, Asleep Beauty, Face Car; Round 2: Thorough Shower, Body Pop, Toy Meal; Round 3: Surprising Rear, Old Man Bites Tenderly, Bad Wind Prick; Round 4: Drum Beat; Total: $4,400/$734 Per Player
206 (25)	January 18, 2010
Can Craig, Andrew, Malcolm, Ross, Justin and Conor emerge victorious in the Silent Library and bring home some cash?: Featured Challenges: Round 1: Coat Chest, Mashed Rear, Sweet Lady; Round 2: Rid Balloons, Red Hose, Bad Door; Round 3: Holiday Twist, Hard Gum, Joining Swine; Round 4: Too Much Drinks; Total: $3,500/$584 Per Player
207 (26)	January 25, 2010
Members of the band Forever the Sickest Kids: Caleb, Jonathan, Kent, Kyle, Austin and Marc.: Featured Challenges: Round 1: Internal Bust, Egg Rollers, Captain Wheel; Round 2: Toy Meal, Little Leg Kick, Small Putts; Round 3: Unreal Chest, Brush Belt, Camp Fire Mix Up; Round 4: Swat Team; Total: $2,700/$450 Per Player
208 (27)	January 26, 2010
Wynette, Emmy, Carla, Jaysa, Tania and Paula face the Silent Library for some hard cash.: Featured Challenges: Round 1: Sour Button, Headed Wind, Bad Taste Donuts; Round 2: Prince Search, Bug Blow, Hair Lift; Round 3: Fish Row, Sad Dinner, No Good Fortune; Round 4: Hair Transfer; Total: $3,500/$584 Per Player
209 (28)	January 27, 2010
Devin, Joe, Mike, Sam, Sean and Tim step into the ring with the Silent Library.: Featured Challenges: Round 1: Clean Nose, Fast Cream, Bad Deal; Round 2: Couch Vacuum, Rear Lighting, Too Close Rope Jump; Round 3: Snow Fun, Bad Door, Nipple Run; Round 4: Pocket Balls; Total: $3,500/$584 Per Player
210 (29)	January 28, 2010
Marcos, John, Nick, Ry, Chris and Izzi step off the rugby field and in to the Silent Library.: Featured Challenges: Round 1: Bowl Brush, Sweet Stick Lady, Slapping Machine; Round 2: Foul Fountain, Unplunged, Old Pinch; Round 3: Destroy Foot, Pucked, Dispensed; Round 4: Small Balls; Total: $3,700/$617 Per Player
211 (30)	February 1, 2010
Jessie James, her sister Sydney, her manager Hallie, her bass player John, and their friends Patrick and Steven take on the Silent Library.: Featured Challenges: Round 1: Clean Face, Mouth Fizzle, Head Game; Round 2: Rear Footing, Dread Drops, Knuckle Drill; Round 3: Forked Catch, Dispensed, Loud Supper; Round 4: Bad Door; Total: $3,200/$534 Per Player
212 (31)	February 2, 2010
Joe, Paul, Michael, Charles, Russ and Pat make it rain in the Silent Library.: Featured Challenges: Round 1: Horse Hit, Hit Hat, No Good Mallet; Round 2: Sausage Festival, Chin Spin, Self Hoist; Round 3: Squeezed Pull, Handed Animal, Meat Cage; Round 4: Bad Smell Spray; Total: $4,700/$784 Per Player
213 (32)	February 3, 2010
PT, Tony, Steve, Chris, Luis and RJ go from the frat house to the Silent Library.: Featured Challenges: Round 1: Spice Ball, Bad Milk Air, Dirt Suck; Round 2: Hard Taste, Electric Zip, Knuckle Drill; Round 3: Legging Meat, Sushi Mix Up, Rip Off; Round 4: Untapped; Total: $3,100/$517 Per Player
214 (33)	February 4, 2010
Kevin, Tim, Chris, Gabriel, Dwight and David venture in to the Silent Library.: Featured Challenges: Round 1: Baby Fish Mouth, Faced Music, Sugar Sniff; Round 2: Not Happy Birthday, Physical Pain, Five Cheeses Pizza; Round 3: Trapping Glue, Worst Shot, No Good Fortune; Round 4: Topped Dog; Total: $2,900/$484 Per Player
215 (34)	February 5, 2010
Melissa, Mel, Aisha, Kim, Deonna and Jessica take a break from cheerleading to compete for some serious cash.: Featured Challenges: Round 1: Hit Hat, Earring Loss, Rear Pop; Round 2: Clean Breath Fondue, Wet Pants, Couch Share; Round 3: Bad Door, Fly Swat Face, Pudding Eat Blow; Round 4: Snack Search; Total: $3,600/$600 Per Player
216 (35)	February 8, 2010
The band, We the Kings: Travis, Danny, Drew, Hunter, and their friends Dylan and Julian head in to the Silent Library.: Featured Challenges: Round 1: Head Cold, Pulled Sniff, Not Expected Package; Round 2: Baby Kick, Hard Look Pass, Throat Stick; Round 3: Rounded, Two Formal Strike, Angry Dog; Round 4: Big Busts; Total: $2,800/$467 Per Player
217 (36)	February 9, 2010
Dan, Tate, Stephen, Jon, Jordan and Matt check out the Silent Library.: Featured Challenges: Round 1: Meat Wallet, Hot Shave, Back Rug; Round 2: Poultry Drain, Rodent Hand Slap, Bad Door; Round 3: Nipple Run, Suspender Strike, Shared Shake; Round 4: Too Big Band; Total: $2,100/$350 Per Player
218 (37)	February 10, 2010
Max, Dylan, Jon, Anthony, Joe and Dan test their skills in the Silent Library.: Featured Challenges: Round 1: Baby Kick, Small Sentence, Mayo Cone; Round 2: Tender Hands, Desert Wind, Couch Share; Round 3: Deviled Play Ground, Book Drop, Faced Leaves; Round 4: Pocket Balls; Total: $3,900/$650 Per Player
219 (38)	February 11, 2010
Jon, Brad, Mike, Rob, Erik and Joe head over to the Silent Library.: Featured Challenges: Round 1: Not Fruit, Bad Nose Air, Scratch Board; Round 2: Faced Meat, Not Hot Meal, Little Beach; Round 3: Not Lucky Tug, Passion Doll, Vinegar Five Ways; Round 4: Soap Shower; Total: $4,000/$667 Per Player
220 (39)	February 12, 2010
Stephanie, Kristy, Jenna, Krystyn, Lindsay and Melanie try to win some cash at the Silent Library.: Featured Challenges: Round 1: Head Ping, Lips Stick Spin, Stuck Shot; Round 2: Pickled Choice, Worst Inflation, Rock Skip Jump; Round 3: Balled Pedal, Fancy Taste, Night Bugs; Round 4: Topped Dog; Total: $5,100/$850 Per Player

=== Season 3 (2010) ===
Episode #	Original Airdate
301 (40)	June 28, 2010
The NFL Team New York Giants: Kevin Boss, Shaun O'Hara, David Diehl, Dave Tollefson, Rich Seubert, Chris Snee.: Featured Challenges: Round 1: Old Man Bites Tenderly, Suspender Strike, Like Rabbit; Round 2: Swing Set, Little Italy Mix Up; Round 3: Balled Pedal, Destroy Foot, Five Way Sap; Round 4: Topped Cream; Total: $5,500/$917 Per Each Charity
302 (41)	June 29, 2010
From the band All Time Low: Alex Gaskarth, Jack Barakat, Rian Dawson. Their tour manager Matt. Their friends Jeff and Vinny.: Featured Challenges: Round 1: Too Big Lady, Licking Glass, Beard Brush; Round 2: Flipper Flop, Red Neck Mix Up, Too Much Wine; Round 3: Unexpected Mexican, Snow Job, Wreck Ball; Round 4: Soup Shoot; Total: $3,200/$534 Per Player
303 (42)	June 30, 2010
From the band Hey Monday: Cassadee Pope, Jersey, Mike and Alex. From the band Stereo Skyline: Kevin and Brian.: Featured Challenges: Round 1: Pumped Walk, News Paper Toss, Return Belt; Round 2: Running Stick, Hard Gum, Octopussed; Round 3: Comb Over Comb, Bad Door, Drive Over Prick; Round 4: Unwanted Fan; Total: $3,400/$567 Per Player
304 (43)	July 1, 2010
From the New Boyz: Legacy, and BenJ, singer Iyaz, their friends Marc and Carl, and their security guard Big Cheese: Featured Challenges: Round 1: Hard Jump Shot, Shared Bear, Fish Flakes; Round 2: Brief Ride, Not Wanted Hug, Finished Plate; Round 3: Big Busts, Knuckle Drill, Bad Door; Round 4: Pain By Number; Total: $3,700/$617 Per Player
305 (44)	July 6, 2010
Watch six friends, Matt, Brendan, Ivan, Mark, Mike and Vinny compete on Silent Library with special guest Nadya Suleman, the Octomom.: Featured Challenges: Round 1: Hopping Blow, Water Less Meal, Old Master; Round 2: Balled Spit, Death Leg, Spike Suck; Round 3: Skee Balls, Chicken Scratch, Fizzed Drunk; Round 4: Too Much Babies; Total: $3,300/$550 Per Player
306 (45)	July 7, 2010
Jason, Jeremy, Roberto, Nick, Brandon and Josh face the Silent Library.: Featured Challenges: Round 1: Hopeful No Drop Dish, Book Drop, Senior Shuffle; Round 2: Flying Disc, Octopussed, Brief Ride; Round 3: Fizzed Drunk, Toss Salad, Bird Feed; Round 4: Bad Door; Total: $2,500/$417 Per Player
307 (46)	July 8, 2010
John, Jerry, Joshua, Vin, Chris and Will face the Silent Library.: Featured Challenges: Round 1: Mayo Ball, Sticky Roll, Bad Door; Round 2: Bug Blow, Ass Shoot, Tied Taste; Round 3: Hair Transfer, Dairy Problem, Face Time; Round 4: Mexican Shoot Off; Total: $3,400/$567 Per Player
308 (47)	July 12, 2010
Ellaina, Winnie, Jenna, Chantell, Kristen, and Heather spend an afternoon licking the hair of a troll doll, kissing a large man's belly, and getting attacked by bridesmaids in the Silent Library.: Featured Challenges: Round 1: Gas Bagged, Puppet Mastered, Troll Lick; Round 2: Body Paint, Five Shots, Face Belly; Round 3: Always Brides Maids, Bird Drop, Bad Clog; Round 4: Angry Dog; Total: $4,900/$817 Per Player
309 (48)	July 14, 2010
George, Jay, Haylon, Basilio, Luciano, and Gui raise the bar in the Silent Library.: Featured Challenges: Round 1: Stupid Hat, Fish Nets Stocking, Nipple Bags; Round 2: Clown Face, Tube Blast, Pants Sandwich; Round 3: Foot Fist Way, Snow Job, Blasted Caps; Round 4: Stacked; Total: $5,200/$867 Per Player
310 (49)	July 15, 2010
Ben, Jesse, Tom, Charlie, Jay, and Vinny face the Silent Library: Featured Challenges: Round 1: Produce Pain, Flied Fish, Bare Hug; Round 2: Found Meat, Unload Bags, Nipple Boat; Round 3: Topped Cream, Roped Chain, Bad Taste Cascade; Round 4: Erased; Total: $2,700/$450 Per Player
311 (50)	July 19, 2010
Amanda, Mike, Kenny, Nick, Jordan and Kelly face the Silent Library: Featured Challenges: Round 1: Large Juice, Rid Balloons, Out Fit Dog; Round 2: Melting Machine, Little Leg Kick, Tan Jersey; Round 3: Jelly Toes, Egg Fire; Round 4: Unwanted Fan; Total: $3,300/$550 Per Player
312 (51)	July 21, 2010
The Band Anarbor: Slade, Adam, Greg, Mike, and their friends Dave and Tom face the Silent Library: Featured Challenges: Round 1: Evil Chair, Fish Sponge, Chin Spin; Round 2: Racket Club, Fast Check Out, Sea Waffle; Round 3: Bad Door, Toy Pie, Fist Throw; Round 4: Lead Storm; Total: $4,000/$667 Per Player
313 (52)	July 22, 2010
Chris, Tony, Colin, Jesse, Greg and Kameron will face the Silent Library: Featured Challenges: Round 1: Castle Jump, Like Rabbit, Rug Dusted; Round 2: Tender Polish, Dirty Grill, Food Dog; Round 3: Chicken Scratch, Skee Balls, Whipped; Round 4: Too Much Dressing; Total: $3,800/$634 Per Player
314 (53)	July 26, 2010
The cast from the MTV show The Hard Times of RJ Berger face the Silent Library. Guest star singer Aubrey O'Day.: Featured Challenges: Round 1: Cast Away, Clean Face, Bar Helmet; Round 2: Racket Belly, Toilet Seating, Running Stick; Round 3: Dirty Drawer, Forked Catch, Unexpected Mexican; Round 4: Too Big Band; Total: $2,200/$367 Per Player
315 (54)	July 27, 2010
Marissa, Ed, Josephine, Djamel, Aicha, and TJ face the Silent Library.: Featured Challenges: Round 1: Chalk Lick, Recycled, Birth Day Surprise; Round 2: Apple Twist, Radiation Scrub, Cradled Balls; Round 3: Fur Transfer, Not Lucky Tug, Bad Taste Cascade; Round 4: Untapped; Total: $3,200/$534 Per Player
316 (55)	July 28, 2010
The Band Honor Society: Michael, Andrew, Jason, and Alexander, and their friends Ashlyne Huff and Just Kait face the Silent library.: Featured Challenges: Round 1: Snappy Tie, Puppet Mastered, Sad Juice; Round 2: Milk Lick, Electric Soup, Juggle Chest; Round 3: Lap Pop, Mexico Mix Up, Flied Eggs; Round 4: Throw Like Woman; Total: $4,400/$734 per player
317 (56)	July 30, 2010
Diego, Dane, Chris, Joseph, Anthony, and Isaac face the Silent Library.: Featured Challenges: Round 1: First Aid, Noodle Headed, Captain Wheel; Round 2: Bad Turn, Bad Wind Prick, Two Formal Strike; Round 3: Five Shots, Nipple Choppers, Flown Wedding; Round 4: Dance Ball; Total: $1,500/$250 Per Player
318 (57)	August 2, 2010
Kyle, Ben, Kevin, Eric, Matt, and Terrence face the Silent Library.: Featured Challenges: Round 1: Head Squid, Vial Smell, Cheer Up Clown; Round 2: Beach Bust, Faced Pinch, Bathroom Lick; Round 3: Sushi Search, Private Salami, Dairy Problem; Round 4: Too Much Drinks; Total: $2,500/$417 Per Player
319 (58)	August 4, 2010
Jessica, Kristen, Toniann, Michelle, Danielle, and Marina face the Silent Library: Featured Challenges: Round 1: Cold Wet Roll, Unreal Pain, Too Much Baggage; Round 2: Clown Face, Tender Hands, Body Pop; Round 3: Drunk Cup, No Rest Chair, Snap Storm; Round 4: Too Much Dressing; Total: $2,600/$434 Per Player
320 (59)	August 5, 2010
The Band NeverShoutNever: Christofer, Taylor, Nathan, Caleb, Hayden, and their friend, Nick, go head to head with the Silent Library.: Featured Challenges: Round 1: Little Tromboner, Beaned Animal Spin, Punish Hand; Round 2: Candy Head, Discussed, Death Leg; Round 3: Lap Pop, Oh No Yo Yo, Face Time; Round 4: Bad Door; Total: $3,900/$650 Per Player

=== Season 4 (2011) ===
Episode #	Original Airdate
S4 E1 (60)	March 28, 2011
WWE Superstars: Dolph Ziggler, Chris Masters, Trent Baretta, Caylen Croft, JTG and Curt Hawkins lay the smackdown on the Silent Library.: Featured Challenges: Round 1: Return Belt, Balled Head, Baby Fish Mouth; Round 2: Wurst Waitress, Found Meat, Bird Feed; Round 3: Twister Smack, Melon Fire, Groin Factory; Round 4: Nipple Race; Total: $4,400/$734 Per Player
S4 E2 (61)	March 29, 2011
The members of 3OH!3: Sean, Nat, their guitarist Brandon, their bassist Isom, their producer Benny Blanco and their DJ Skeet take on the Silent Library.: Featured Challenges: Round 1: Face Belly, Baby Back, Big Bird; Round 2: Uncomfort Ball, Rodent Feet, Number One Food; Round 3: Mop Head, Private Work Out, Break Fast Bed; Round 4: Brief Winch; Total: $3,100/$517 Per Player
S4 E3 (62)	March 30, 2011
The cast of Jersey Shore: Snooki, Sammi Sweetheart, J-WOWW, Pauly D, Ronnie Ortiz-Magro and Vinny Guadagnino challenge the Silent Library. Guest star Jersey Shore's newest cast member Deena Nicole Cortese.: Featured Challenges: Round 1: Back Butter, Suspender Strike, Slapping Machine; Round 2: Fed Up Groom, Falling Star, Ungrouped Hug; Round 3: Hitted Show, Smell Good Hurt Bad, Pizza Shoot Off; Round 4: Bad Door; Total: $1,900/$317 Per Player
S4 E4 (63)	March 31, 2011
The Ready Set: Jordan, Andy, Travis, Keegan, their merchandise manager Jason, and their sound man Deryick challenge the Silent Library: Featured Challenges: Round 1: Sweet Red Corn, Running Water, School Yard Slap; Round 2: Not Wanted Greeting, Freedom Meat, Body Rake; Round 3: Twister Smack, Liver Cone, Gloved Catch; Round 4: Trapping Glue; Total: $4,400/$734 Per Player
S4 E5 (64)	April 1, 2011
Jimmy Fallon and The Roots: Black Thought, Questlove, Captain Kirk Douglas, Frank Knuckles and Owen Biddle challenge the Silent Library.: Featured Challenges: Round 1: Fish Music, Eat Cake, Face Pizza; Round 2: Pants Sandwich, Extra Tongue, Castle Jump; Round 3: Scared Crow, Balled Pedal, Pan Cake Fire; Round 4: Pedal Pop; Total: $5,500/$917 Per Each Charity
S4 E6 (65)	April 4, 2011
Anthony, Llowel, Richard, Bobby, Ronel and Ricardo challenge the Silent Library.: Featured Challenges: Round 1: Big Bird, Sink Hole, Flied Catch; Round 2: Smacking Twirl, Propel Face, Licked Pole; Round 3: Sheep Transfer, Break Fast Bed, Scared Crow; Round 4: Groin Saw; Total: $3,000/$500 Per Player
S4 E7 (66)	April 5, 2011
Anthony, Louis, Perry, Mike, Jason and Eric take on the world, and the Silent Library.: Featured Challenges: Round 1: Face Pizza, Head On Crash, Special Egg; Round 2: Bad Door, Skid Marks, Bad Knight; Round 3: Groin Balls, Wait Wheel, Erupt In Rear; Round 4: Fed Up Animals; Total: $2,300/$384 Per Player
S4 E8 (67)	April 6, 2011
Members of the Jungle Boogie Dance crew: Raqi, Beejay, Anthony, Twan, Kenneth and Antwain face the Silent Library: Featured Challenges: Round 1: Eat Cake, Over Pressure, Foot In Mouth; Round 2: Castle Jump, Unfresh Cow, Ungrouped Hug; Round 3: Bad Taste Art, Foot Fist Way, Body Treat; Round 4: Nipple Robot; Total: $2,500/$417 Per Player
S4 E9 (68)	April 7, 2011
Travis, Phil, Ian, Anthony, Jimmy and Matt challenge the Silent Library. Guest star Judah Friedlander.: Featured Challenges: Round 1: Bagel Belly, Run Down, Spun Licorice; Round 2: Not Hot Meal, Tired Belly, Bad Nose Air; Round 3: Private Crash, Leaked Garbage, Heads Ping; Round 4: Drink Problem; Total: $3,800/$634 Per Player
S4 E10 (69)	April 11, 2011
Marco, Pat, John, Erick, Mike and Justin challenge the Silent Library.: Featured Challenges: Round 1: Foot In Mouth, Change in Weather, Below Belt; Round 2: Croquet Balls, Carnival Mix Up, Thrown Kiss; Round 3: Snack Snap, Band Bust, Finger Food; Round 4: Nipple Robot; Total: $3,200/$534 Per Player
S4 E11 (70)	April 12, 2011
Kathryn, Katie, Melissa, Caitlyn, Juliana and Kristin challenge the Silent Library. Guest star Top Chef DC winner Kevin Sbraga: Featured Challenges: Round 1: Puffing Jacket, Dental Bob, Foot Face Way; Round 2: Bad Luck Spin, Shoe Liver, Running Water; Round 3: Temporary Seal, Rubber Hand, Shared Shake; Round 4: Out Fit Squeeze; Total: $3,800/$634 Per Player
S4 E12 (71)	April 13, 2011
Matt, Nick, Vinny, Jay, Dell and Michael challenge the Silent Library: Featured Challenges: Round 1: Junk In Rear, Flied Catch, Noodle Mop; Round 2: Unfit, Bad Truck Stop, Cavity Search; Round 3: Fruit Lady, Fish Suck, Cheap Slot; Round 4: Corns; Total:
S4 E13 (72)	April 14, 2011
Robbee, Paul, James, Tom, Marcus and Josh challenge the Silent Library. Guest star Ike Davis of the New York Mets: Featured Challenges: Round 1: Digging Worms, Money Trouble, Finished Plate; Round 2: Snack Snap, Not Fruit, Smacking Twirl; Round 3: Hopping Blows, Old Nipples, Bad Door; Round 4: Gloved Catch; Total: $2,700/$450 Per Player
S4 E14 (73)	April 18, 2011
Anthony, Danny, Andre, Nick, Colin and Ian take on the Silent Library: Featured Challenges: Round 1: Wrong Brush, Head on Crash, Fixed Button; Round 2: Skid Marks, Night Time Dress Down, Lick Back Ink; Round 3: Little Pole, Snack Rack, Melon Fire; Round 4: Brief Winch; Total: $3,100/$517 Per Player
S4 E15 (74)	April 20, 2011
Members of the Lingerie Football League team Philadelphia Passion: Dana, Heather, Jaleesa, Tanyka Renee, H.P. and Whitney challenge the Silent Library: Featured Challenges: Round 1: Beard Brush, Rear Pop, Blind Lick; Round 2: Eat Like Baby, Meat Hugger, Bad Treatment; Round 3: Movie Mix Up, Bed Bunk, Tongue Race; Round 4: No Hand Take Out; Total: $2,600/$434 Per Player
S4 E16 (75)	April 21, 2011
P, Quez, Lennon, Justin, Peter and Nelz challenge the Silent Library: Featured Challenges: Round 1: Padded Bust, Private Punch, Sour Shave; Round 2: Wurst Waitress, Window Pain, Blasted Nuts; Round 3: Old Nipples, Liver Cone, Bulls Hit; Round 4: Tired Five; Total: $1,900/$317 Per Player
S4 E17 (76)	April 25, 2011
Cesare, Danny, Ciaran, Jair, Adam and Ryan step up their game in the Silent Library.: Featured Challenges: Round 1: Cold Wet Roll, Brief Fish, Ball Park Sundae; Round 2: Return Keys, Unfresh Cow, Nut Cracker; Round 3: Dirty Ride, Nipples Tape, File Down; Round 4: Lapped Santa; Total: $3,800/$634 Per Player
S4 E18 (77)	April 26, 2011
Dean, David, Hao, Mike, Anthony and Lee challenge the Silent Library.: Featured Challenges: Round 1: Globed Lick, Western Swinger, Body Harp; Round 2: Tongue Bath, Piano Fingers, Stunning Cow; Round 3: Bed Bunk, Drunk Hamsters, Cheap Slot; Round 4: Monkey Missile; Total: $3,200/$534 Per Player
S4 E19 (78)	April 27, 2011
It's time to see if Tommy, Yohancey, Alex, Ali, Brendan and Peter will emerge victorious in the Silent Library.: Featured Challenges: Round 1: Fish Swing, Tongued Frog, Beard Flakes; Round 2: Roped Chain, Butter Milk, Little Discipline; Round 3: Polish Off Shoe, Big Bad Breath, Bulls Hit; Round 4: Kick Line; Total: $3,900/$650 Per Player
S4 E20 (79)	April 28, 2011
Jason, Anthony, Marc, Corey, Travis and Joe take no prisoners in the Silent Library.: Featured Challenges: Round 1: Crotch Doctor, Tartar Teeth, Beard Return; Round 2: Piano Smack Down, Cafeteria Mix Up, Clay Face; Round 3: Produce Score, Hitted Show, Pan Cake Fire; Round 4: Dog House; Total: $4,500/$750 Per Player
S4 E21 (80)	May 2, 2011
Louie, Mike, Dennis, Deion, Corey and Ivan do it big in the Silent Library.: Featured Challenges: Round 1: Black Belted, Stuck in Middle, Crotch Doctor; Round 2: Body Kick, Tipping Bird, Mullet of Sea; Round 3: Self Hoist, Cheesy Glue, Groin Balls; Round 4: Rip Off Names; Total: $4,000/$667 Per Player
S4 E22 (81)	May 3, 2011
Chad, Brian, Mike, Dan, Matt and Dan go to extreme lengths in the Silent Library.: Featured Challenges: Round 1: Wrong Brush, Strike Balls, Dressing Downed; Round 2: Beard Candy, Stunning Cow, Erupt in Rear; Round 3: Private Crash, Kneeded Push, Tender Buttons; Round 4: Nipple Race; Total: $2,900/$484 Per Player
S4 E23 (82)	May 4, 2011
Sam, Cheyenne, Emily, Nicole, Zaina and Julianne take on the Silent Library: Featured Challenges: Round 1: Jump Spike, Stirrup Strike, Drunk Cup; Round 2: Not Wanted Five, Big Bad Breath, Hair Treat; Round 3: Sheep Transfer, Pie Fire, Fish Suck; Round 4: Explosive Stool; Total: $2,200/$367 Per Player
S4 E24 (83)	May 5, 2011
Anthony, Kien, Nuor, Anthony, Randy and Stephen raise the bar in the Silent Library.: Featured Challenges: Round 1: Full Toilet, Foul Support, Peanut Butter Jelly Fish; Round 2: Thrown Kiss, Extra Tongue, Boxing Belted; Round 3: Fisted Jack, Groin Factory, Temporary Seal; Round 4: Large Pie; Total: $3,900/$650 Per Player
S4 E25 (84)	May 6, 2011
Carl, Michael, Christian, Tom, Mike and Zach are punished by a toothless man, a boxer and a fruit hat-wearing lady in the Silent Library.: Featured Challenges: Round 1: Old Man Bites Tenderly, Baby Back, Meat Straw; Round 2: Body Bag, Butter Milk, Pants Sandwich; Round 3: Fruit Lady, File Down, Nipple Sledding; Round 4: Fed Up Animals; Total: $2,300/$384 Per Player
S4 E26 (85)	May 9, 2011
Mike, Vinny, Chris, James, Lenny, and Z are thrown for a loop in the Silent Library.: Featured Challenges: Round 1: Peanut Butter Jelly Fish, Historic Chest, Private Punch; Round 2: Beach Bust, Toss Sandwich, Little Discipline; Round 3: Destroy Bone, Spot On Dog, Finger Food; Round 4: Shell Shock; Total: $4,000/$667 Per Player
S4 E27 (86)	May 10, 2011
Yola, Katie, Ashley, Nia, Gwen and Tiffeny take on the Silent Library. Guest star Nitro Circus star Tommy Passemante.: Featured Challenges: Round 1: Fish Music, Wet Suit, Pool Head; Round 2: Lip Hair Lick, Big Bounce, Stink Wheel; Round 3: Thrown Spin, Beneath Wings, Frozen Taste; Round 4: Dirt Bike; Total: $4,400/$734 Per Player
S4 E28 (87)	May 11, 2011
Elijah, Paul, Landon, Billy, Steve and Isaiah take on the Silent Library.: Featured Challenges: Round 1: Snap Toe, Flagged, Fancy Rip Off; Round 2: Tipping Bird, Piano Smack Down, Food Dog; Round 3: Navel Attack, Private Work Out, Jelly Buff; Round 4: Pedal Pop; Total: $4,100/$684 Per Player
S4 E29 (88)	May 12, 2011
Peter, Mike, Justin, Greg, Mark and JC try their hand at winning in the Silent Library.: Featured Challenges: Round 1: Alarming Clock, Rear Squeeze, Sour Crisp; Round 2: Sticky Blow, Body Bag, Number One Food; Round 3: Italian Fling, Heart Broken, Bad Door; Round 4: Shell Shock; Total: $3,700/$617 Per Player
S4 E30 (89)	May 13, 2011
Mark, Irving, Leo, Cyrus, JC and Marlon take matters into their own hands in the final installment of Silent Library.: Featured Challenges: Round 1: Blowing Liar, Deviled Snow, Western Swinger; Round 2: Early Violin, Morning Cookie, Handed Copy; Round 3: Faced Pinch, Front Back Sandwich, Pizza Shoot Off; Round 4: Groin Saw; Total: $4,200/$700 Per Player
