= Pros Vs Heroes =

Pros Vs. Heroes

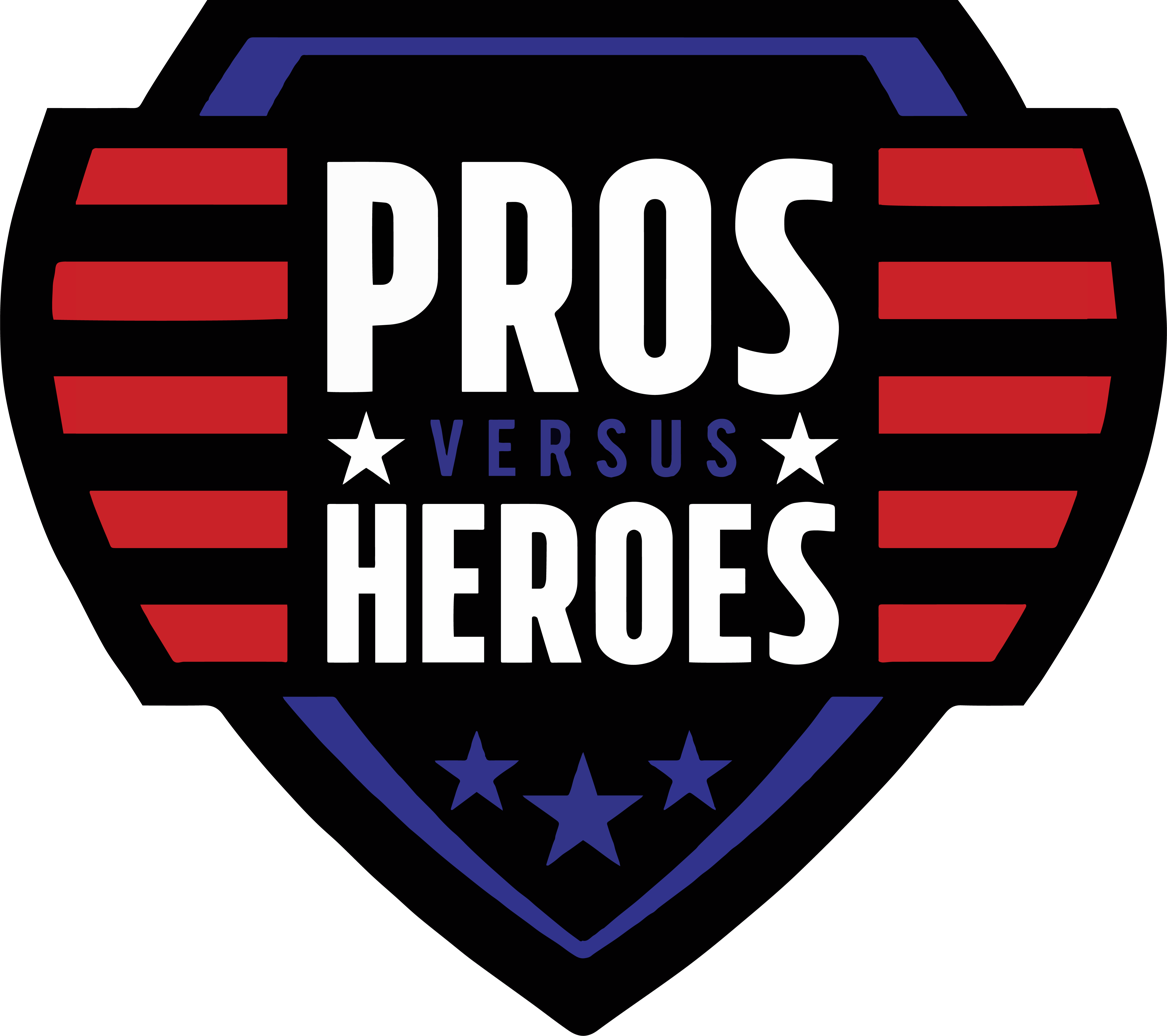
Logo

Pros Vs. Heroes is a flag football game produced by Motor Media. Pros Vs. Heroes is a fundraising platform created to raise money and awareness for charities.

== About ==
The game has former NFL, current NFL, and other professional athletes travel around the country to play in flag football games against police officers, firefighters, armed forces and EMT personnel. The game was created in 2014 and is now expanding to different areas around the United States. Motor Media produces the games to raise money and give back to communities. Since its first game in June 2014, the program has raised money and awareness for several causes.

In the last year, five games have been played in the Pros Vs. Heroes series. The first and second game was played at Toms River North, New Jersey against the Toms River Force and South River Brave. The third game was played in Arizona against the Chandler Police Officers and Fire Department at Westwood High School. Recently, games were played in Seaside Heights, New Jersey during the Jersey Shore Festival where the Pros took on Homeland Security and the Toms River Police Department.

== NFL players that have Participated ==
- Tim Wright
- Ka'lial Glaud
- Mohamed Sanu
- Marvin Booker
- Antonio Garay
- Kevin Dockery
- Jay Alford
- Brandon Lloyd
- Geoff Pope
- Phillippi Sparks
- Odessa Turner
- Robert “R.J.” Cobb
- Torrance "Tank" Daniels
- Darian Barnes
- Dan Klecko
- Roman Oben
- Amani Toomer
- DeMingo Graham
- Brandon Jones
- Mike Teel
- Lance Briggs
- Aaron Beasley
- Raheem Brock
- Kevin Malast
- J'Vonne Parker
- Brian Leonard
- Al Singleton
- Dan Klecko
- Frank Sanders
- Adrian Murrell
- Seth Joyner
- Kwamie Lassister
- Michael Bankston
- Frank Sanders
- Adrian Murrell
- Damian Anderson
- Roy McKinnon
- Bruce Mathison
- David Barrett
- Larry Centers
- Amp Lee
- MarTay Jenkins
- Mark McMillan
- Robert Tate
- Bruce Mathison
- Mark McMillian
- Sidney Justin
- Chris Jennings
- Mark Collins

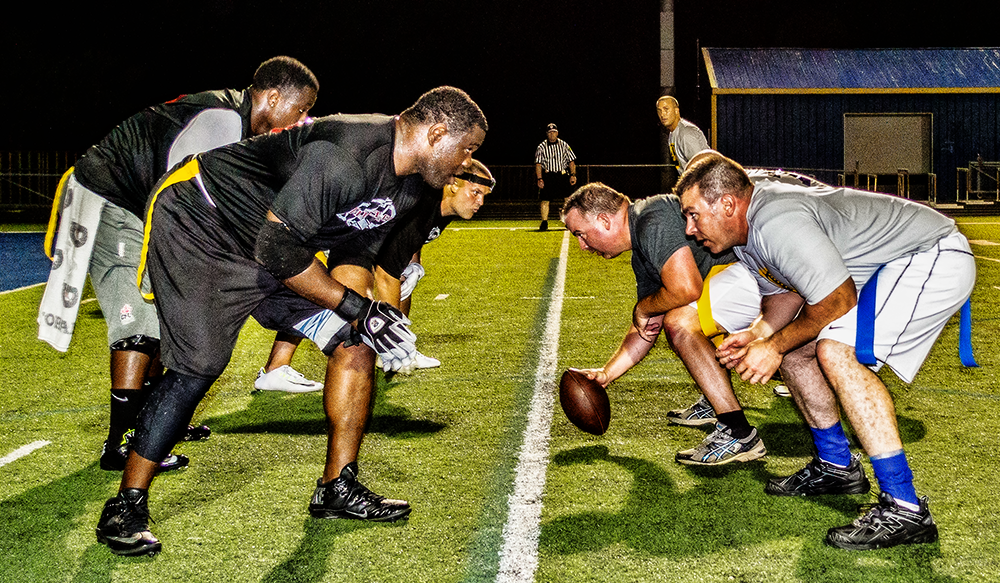
Pros Vs. Heroes First Game Against Toms River force

== AFL players that have participated ==
- Dan Garay (New York Dragons)
- Donny Klein (Columbus Destroyers)
- Will Holder (New York Dragons)

== LFL players that have participated ==
- Tanyka Renee (Philadelphia Passion)
- Marirose Roach (Philadelphia Passion)
- Heather Roy (Philadelphia Passion )
- Jessica Roy (Philadelphia Passion)

== Track & Field ==
- Dan Johnson
- Danielle Lynch

== Competitors ==
Toms River Police Department | South River Fire Department | Chandler Fire Department | Homeland Security |

Team	Date
ProElite vs. Toms River Force	June 2014
ProElite vs. South River Brave	June 2014
ProElite vs. Chandler Police & Fire Dept.	January 2015
ProElite vs. Homeland Security Guardians	May 2015
ProElite vs. Toms River Force/Toms River Flame	May 2015
ProElite vs. Toms River Force	May 2016
ProElite vs. Toms River Force	May 2017
ProElite vs. Toms River Force	July 2018

== Sources ==
1. Darian Barnes
2. Asbury Park Press Coverage for Pros Vs. Heroes
3. 94.3 The Point Interview
4. 92.7 WOBM Interview
5. NJ.com Entertainment
6. New Talk WOBM Radio Photo Coverage of Game
7. Fox10 Arizona Mesa Game Interview
8. News12 New Jersey Coverage of Pros Vs. Heroes Game at Jersey Shore Festival
9. Northern Ocean Habitat For Humanity
