= Harris Brothers =

Professional wrestling tag team

Statistics
- Members: Don Harris (AKA Don Bruise / Jacob Blu / Heavy D / Jared Grimm / Patrick / Skull); Ron Harris (AKA 8 Ball / Big Ron / Gerald / Eli Blu / Jason Grimm / Ron Bruise)
- Name(s): Blu Brothers; Bruise Brothers; Creative Control; Disciples of Apocalypse; Disciples of Destruction; Grimm Twins; Harris Boys; Harris Brothers; Harris Twins
- Billed heights: 6 ft 5 in (1.96 m) – Don Harris; 6 ft 5 in (1.96 m) – Ron Harris
- Combined billed weight: 595 lb (270 kg)
- Hometown: Apopka, Florida, U.S.
- Billed from: Nashville, Tennessee
- Debut: 1987
- Disbanded: 2005
- Years active: 1987–2005
- Trained by: Rocky Montana

Ronald Harris and Donald Harris (born October 23, 1961) are American twin brothers best known for their professional wrestling careers with professional wrestling promotions including Extreme Championship Wrestling (ECW), World Championship Wrestling (WCW), and the World Wrestling Federation (WWF, now WWE). They are now co-presidents of the Nashville-based Aro Lucha professional wrestling promotion.

For the majority of their careers, the brothers performed as a tag team. They wrestled under their birth names, known collectively as the Harris Brothers, as well as a variety of ring names, including Don Bruise and Ron Bruise (the Bruise Brothers); Eli Blu and Jacob Blu (the Blu Twins); Jared Grimm and Jason Grimm (the Grimm Twins); Skull and 8 Ball (the Disciples of Apocalypse); and Patrick and Gerald (Creative Control).

== Early life ==
Don and Ron Harris were born in Florida. In the 1980s, Ron and Don relocated to Nashville, Tennessee, in order to become professional wrestlers. Ron worked as a police officer in West Palm Beach, Florida, prior to moving to Tennessee with his brother.

== Professional wrestling career ==
=== Early career (1987–1993) ===
Don and Ron Harris, with support from the country music group Sawyer Brown, debuted in the Continental Wrestling Association in December 1987 as "The Bruise Brothers", where they became two-time World Tag Team Champions. When the CWA became the United States Wrestling Association in 1989, the Bruise Brothers remained in the promotion. Don and Ron won five more Tag Team Championships, with Don winning two additional USWA World Tag Team Championships with Brian Lee and Ron winning an additional USWA World Tag Team Championship with Jimmy Harris (no relation) as "Beauty and The Beast". The Harris Brothers made a final appearance with the USWA in 1996 as "The Grimm Brothers".

In 1991, the Bruise Brothers debuted in the Oregon-based National Wrestling Alliance Pacific Northwest promotion, where they became six-time Tag Team Champions. Don Harris was also part of the last match in that promotion's television show, defeating Jon Rambo. On January 27, 1992, the Harris Twins received a tryout match with the WWF at a Wrestling Challenge taping in Lubbock, Texas, defeating Khris Germany and Todd Overbow. They beat the duo again the next night in Amarillo. In March 1993, the Twins worked a few matches for World Championship Wrestling.

=== Smoky Mountain Wrestling (1993–1994) ===
In 1993, the Harris Brothers joined Smoky Mountain Wrestling as the Bruise Brothers, managed by Jim Cornette. On June 28, Cornette led them to a victory over the Rock 'n' Roll Express, Ricky Morton and Robert Gibson, for the SMW Tag Team Championships. The Bruise Brothers remained in SMW until early 1994, participating in hardcore matches such as Street Fights and steel cage matches.

=== Eastern/Extreme Championship Wrestling (1994) ===
The Bruise Brothers appeared in Extreme Championship Wrestling in 1994. On February 5, the ECW Tag Team Championships were held-up after a controversial ending to a match between the Bruise Brothers and the incumbents, The Public Enemy. The Bruise Brothers went on to participate in some of the first ECW hardcore matches, and feuded with Shane Douglas.

=== World Wrestling Federation (1995) ===
The Harris Brothers were signed by the World Wrestling Federation (WWF) in January 1995, where they were renamed "The Blu Brothers", Eli (Ron) and Jacob (Don). They retained their trademark bushy beards and long hair and donned garb to resemble mountain men, and were managed by Uncle Zebekiah. They made their WWF debuts shortly before the 1995 Royal Rumble and were defeated by Lex Luger and The British Bulldog in the opening match of WrestleMania XI. Jacob Blu competed in the King of the Ring 1995 tournament losing to Razor Ramon in the qualifying round. Following a series of losses to the Smoking Gunns, the Harris Brothers left the WWF in October 1995.

=== Extreme Championship Wrestling (1996) ===
After leaving the WWF they returned to ECW in 1996 as the Bruise Brothers, competing once more in the tag division, and briefly joining Raven's Nest.

=== Return to the World Wrestling Federation (1996–1999) ===
Don and Ron Harris returned to the WWF in September 1996, as the short-lived "Grimm Twins," Jason (Ron) and Jared (Don) where they had matches with the Smoking Gunns and the Godwinns.

In June 1997, were repackaged as babyfaces and were given the names "8-Ball" (Ron) and "Skull" (Don) and joined Crush's Disciples of Apocalypse stable with their real-life cousin Chainz (although it was never revealed that they were cousins on television). The brothers had their heads shaved and had goatees. The DOA participated in the "gang wars" of 1997, feuding with the Nation of Domination and the Puerto Rican stable Los Boricuas as well as the South African stable The Truth Commission.

After The Montreal screwjob, Crush left the WWF and Chainz became the new leader of the DOA, however by February 1998, Chainz started doing singles matches, but remained a member of the DOA with Skull and 8-Ball.

In June 1998, the three members of the DOA feuded with the LOD 2000 and Droz. Chainz had his last match in the WWF on the June 15, 1998, episode of Raw Is War, where he lost to Val Venis. After this match he failed a drug test and was fired from the WWF. After Chainz was fired, the LOD 2000's former manager Paul Ellering, came back to the WWF to reunite with the LOD 2000, but turned on them and sided with the DOA. This feud was short lived and the DOA beat Paul Ellering up and fired him after an argument. 8-Ball also competed in the WWF's Brawl For All tournament on July 20, 1998, but lost to 2 Cold Scorpio in the third round. Their last match in WWF as a tag team was at a house show, which was a loss to Ken Shamrock and Mankind on May 14, 1999. Skull's last match was in a singles match at a house show against Ken Shamrock on May 15, 1999, in which he was defeated. 8-Ball's last match was in a singles match at a house show against Ken Shamrock on May 16, 1999, in which he was also defeated. The brothers were released from the WWF soon after.

=== World Championship Wrestling (1999–2001) ===
In November 1999, the Harris Brothers joined World Championship Wrestling (WCW) as "Gerald" (Ron) and "Patrick" (Don). The names were shots at Pat Patterson and Gerald Brisco who worked for WWF as Vince McMahon's stooges. They were known collectively as "Creative Control". They went on to join the nWo 2000 in 2000 using their real names, acting as enforcers for Jeff Jarrett. They remained in WCW throughout 2000, feuding with Sid Vicious, Terry Funk and many of the younger tag teams, such as The Mamalukes. After winning the WCW World Tag Team Championship three times, the Harris Brothers began wrestling in singles matches in 2001, but WCW was purchased by the WWF in March 2001, and they were not hired.

=== Late career (2001–2005) ===
In November and December 2001, Don and Ron Harris took part in the All Japan Pro Wrestling World's Strongest Tag Determination League 2001, an eight-team tag tournament. They defeated The Varsity Club (Mike Rotunda and Steve Williams) before losing to Mitsuya Nagai and Toshiaki Kawada in the tournament semi-finals.

In June 2002, the Harris Brothers were hired by the upstart Total Nonstop Action Wrestling (TNA) promotion, joined Vince Russo's Sports Entertainment Xtreme faction in December 2002, and remained with the stable until it disbanded in mid-2003.

On July 19, 2003, Ron Harris appeared in Harley Race's World League Wrestling promotion, and, in a match refereed by Ricky Steamboat, won the WLW Heavyweight Championship by defeating Ron Powers (he was substituting for Trevor Rhodes, who had been injured earlier that evening). He lost the title on September 12, 2003, to Takeshi Morishima in a Tokyo title defence in the Nippon Budokan promoted by the Pro Wrestling Noah promotion.

In late 2003, Ron Harris began working for wrestler and burgeoning rap artist Randy Savage as a tour manager. The Harris Brothers were reunited in November 2004 when Savage debuted in TNA and, following a backstage altercation with his rival Hulk Hogan, requested that he be accompanied by two bodyguards at all times. The job was given to Ron Harris and Savage's tour bodyguard, Brian Adams. Savage had his final match in the promotion in a 6-man tag team match with Jeff Hardy and AJ Styles in a victory over Jeff Jarrett, Kevin Nash and Scott Hall on December 5, 2004, then immediately left the company, but the Harris Brothers were retained to act as road agents. In March 2005, the Harris Brothers reappeared onscreen as "The Disciples of Destruction", two bikers as a nod to their previous WWF gimmick. They were managed by Traci Brooks and had three final victories, one over Buck Quartermain and Lex Lovett, one over Trinity's team Phi Delta Slam and one over the team of Cassidy Riley and Shark Boy.

== Retirement ==
Don Harris effectively retired from the ring in 2005, and began working backstage with TNA as production manager. In the same year, Ron Harris retired from professional wrestling and began working for the Christian music record label Beach Street Records. In 2007 Ron, Don and Frank Miller formed the Nashville-based management company O-Seven Artist Management.

They work for Aroluxe, a marketing and production company. In January 2016, TNA hired Aroluxe to pay for its TV tapings.

== Nazi symbol controversy ==
In 2002, the brothers appeared on a TNA PPV wearing shirts with the Nazi SS symbol, as well as displaying tattoos they had of the symbol (which they later got covered up). TNA apologized for the incident after the PPV. In 2018, the CEO of Aroluxe (a company who partnered with the brothers behind a new wrestling promotion) denied the brothers had Nazi ties, claiming the shirts were worn because they were in character as bikers. Journalist Ryan Satin noted the ADL’s explanation of biker gangs appropriating Nazi symbols meaning “SS bolts in the context of the outlaw biker subculture does not necessarily denote actual adherence to white supremacy.”

== Championships and accomplishments ==
- Championship Wrestling International Alliance
  - CWIA International Tag Team Championship (1 time)
- Continental Wrestling Association
  - CWA Tag Team Championship (2 times)
- Pacific Northwest Wrestling
  - NWA Pacific Northwest Tag Team Championship (6 times)
- Ring Around The Northwest Newsletter
  - Tag Team of the Year (1991–1992)
- Smoky Mountain Wrestling
  - SMW Tag Team Championship (1 time)
- United States Wrestling Association
  - USWA World Tag Team Championship (5 times)
- World Championship Wrestling
  - WCW World Tag Team Championship (3 times)
- Wrestling Observer Newsletter awards
  - Worst Feud of the Year (1997) – vs. Los Boricuas

=== Don Harris ===
- Pacific Northwest Wrestling
  - NWA Pacific Northwest Tag Team Championship (1 time) – with The Grappler
- United States Wrestling Association
  - USWA World Tag Team Championship (2 times) – with Brian Lee

=== Ron Harris ===
- Pacific Northwest Wrestling
  - NWA Pacific Northwest Heavyweight Championship (2 times)
- United States Wrestling Association
  - USWA World Tag Team Championship (1 time) – with Jimmy Harris
- World League Wrestling
  - WLW Heavyweight Championship (1 time)
