= WLW Heavyweight Championship =

Professional wrestling championship

NWA WLW Heavyweight Championship

Details
- Promotion: NWA World League Wrestling
- Date established: February 1999
- Current champion: Camaro Jackson
- Date won: November 2, 2024
Statistics
- First champion: Steve Sharp
- Most reigns: Leland Race(6 reigns)
- Longest reign: Trevor Murdoch (434-464 days)
- Shortest reign: Wade Chism, Luminous Warrior and Rick Steiner (1 day)

The NWA World League Wrestling (WLW) Heavyweight Championship, is a professional wrestling championship in independent professional wrestling promotion NWA World League Wrestling. It is the promotion's primary championship.

The championship is generally contested in professional wrestling matches, in which participants execute scripted finishes rather than contend in direct competition. Some reigns were held by champions using a ring name while others use their real name. Moses is the current champion in his first reign. He won the title in a six-man tag team match featuring himself, Leland Race, and Kyle Roberts against then-champion Derek Stone, Jon Webb, and Camaro Jackson in Troy, Missouri.

As of June 19, 2026, there have been 64 recognized reigns between 35 recognized champions and 9 recognized vacancies. The first champion was Steve Sharp, who won the championship on February 12, 1999. The champion with the single longest reign is Trevor Murdoch, who held the title for 448 days. The champion with the most reigns is Leland Race, who has held the title six times.

== Title history ==
No.	Champion	Date	Event	Location	Reign	Days	Notes	Ref.
1	Steve Sharp	February 12, 1999		Springfield, Missouri	1	64	Defeated Greg Valentine in a tournament final.	
2	Derek Stone	April 17, 1999		Quincy, Illinois	1	210		
—	Vacated	November 13, 1999		Osage Beach, Missouri	—	—	The title was held up after a match against Luminous Warrior.	
3	Derek Stone	November 14, 1999		Kansas City, Missouri	2	69	Stone was awarded the title due to an injury to Luminous Warrior.	
4	Luminous Warrior	January 22, 2000	WLW	California, Missouri	1	1		
5	Derek Stone	January 23, 2000	WLW	Lexington, Missouri	3	34		
6	Luminous Warrior	February 26, 2000	WLW	Iberia, Missouri	2	21		
7	Mr. Destiny	March 18, 2000	WLW	Mexico, Missouri	1	13		
8	Luminous Warrior	March 31, 2000	WLW	Kahoka, Missouri	3	20	Warrior won by reverse decision after Mr. Destiny won the match by hitting Warrior with the title belt.	
9	Meng	April 20, 2000	WLW	Grain Valley, Missouri	1	2		
10	Trevor Rhodes	April 22, 2000	WLW	Eldon, Missouri	1	181		
11	Griz	June 17, 2000	WLW	Osage Beach, Missouri	1	125		
12	Meng	October 20, 2000	WLW	Springfield, Missouri	2	14		
13	The Barbarian	November 3, 2000		Belle, Missouri	1	7		
14	Griz	November 10, 2000	WLW	Joplin, Missouri	2	71		
15	Luminous Warrior	January 20, 2001	WLW	Eldon, Missouri	4	70		
16	Butch Reed	March 31, 2001	WLW	Crocker, Missouri	1	300		
17	Dennis McHawes	January 25, 2002	WLW	Imperial, Missouri	1	155		
—	Vacated	June 29, 2002		East St. Louis, Illinois	—	—		
18	Wade Chism	June 29, 2002	WLW	East St. Louis, Illinois	1	4		
19	Takao Omori	July 13, 2002	WLW	Omaha, Nebraska	1	175		
20	Superstar Steve	January 4, 2003	WLW	Neosho, Missouri	1	35		
21	Haku	February 8, 2003	WLW	El Dorado Springs, Missouri	3	42	Haku was previously known as Meng.	
—	Vacated	March 22, 2003		—	—	—	The title was vacated after match against Trevor Rhodes.	
22	Ron Powers	May 2, 2003	WLW	Kansas City, Missouri	1	78	Defeated Superstar Steve in a tournament final.	
23	Ron Harris	July 19, 2003	WLW	Eldon, Missouri	1	55		
24	Takeshi Morishima	September 12, 2003	Navigation Over the Date Line	Tokyo, Japan	1	196	Match hosted by Pro Wrestling NOAH.	
25	Rick Steiner	March 26, 2004		Chariton, Iowa	1	1		
26	Takeshi Morishima	March 27, 2004		Bolivar, Missouri	2	66		
27	Daisuke Ikeda	June 1, 2004	Navigation with Breeze	Sapporo, Japan	1	61	Match hosted by Pro Wrestling NOAH.	
28	Rick Steiner	August 1, 2004	Exceeding Our Dreams tour	Nagoya, Japan	2	110	Match hosted by Pro Wrestling NOAH.	
29	Trevor Rhodes	November 19, 2004	WLW	Columbus, Nebraska	2	197		
30	Ty Dalton	June 4, 2005	WLW	Eldon, Missouri	1	49	Dalton won the WLW Heavyweight Championship in his debut match with WLW	
31	Wade Chism	July 23, 2005	WLW	Eldon, Missouri	2	189		
—	Vacated	January 28, 2006		Eldon, Missouri	—	—	The title was held up after a match against Keith Walker.	
32	Wade Chism	February 24, 2006	WLW	St. Joseph, Missouri	3	1	Defeated Jason Bates and Keith Walker in a Three Way match.	
33	Jason Bates	February 25, 2006	WLW	El Dorado Springs, Missouri	1	49		
34	Wade Chism	April 15, 2006	WLW	El Dorado Springs, Missouri	4	28		
35	Keith Walker	May 13, 2006	WLW	St. Joseph, Missouri	1	56		
36	Wade Chism	July 8, 2006	WLW	Eldon, Missouri	5	49	This was a lumberjack match. Chism became the first 5 time WLW Heavyweight Champion	
37	Daniel Cross	August 26, 2006	WLW	West Plains, Missouri	1	105	Daniel Cross became the youngest WLW heavyweight Champion at 20 years old.	
38	Trevor Murdoch	December 9, 2006	WLW	Maryland Heights, Missouri	3	216	Murdoch defeated Cross and Ted Dibiase Jr in a 3 way match with Dave Hebner as special referee. Trevor Murdoch was previously known as Trevor Rhodes.	
39	Derek McQuinn	July 13, 2007	Night of Legends	Waterloo, Iowa	1	106		
40	Keith Walker	October 27, 2007	WLW	Maryland Heights, Missouri	2	105	Walker won the Championship on his first match back from his WWE release.	
41	Chris Masters	February 9, 2008	WLW	Fordland, Missouri	1	76		
42	Derek McQuinn	April 25, 2008	WLW	Lebanon, Missouri	2	141		
—	Vacated	September 13, 2008		—	—	—	Derek McQuinn vacated the title due to his having to retire due to injury.	
43	Go Shiozaki	October 4, 2008	WLW	West Plains, Missouri	1	119	Won a nine-man battle royal.	
—	Vacated	January 30, 2009		Richmond, Missouri	—	—		
44	Steve Anthony	January 30, 2009	WLW	Richmond, Missouri	1	50	Defeated Eugene and Superstar Steve in a three-way match.	
45	Superstar Steve	March 21, 2009	WLW	Eldon, Missouri	2	196		
46	Brian Breaker	October 3, 2009	WLW	Eldon, Missouri	1	153		
47	Trent Stone	March 5, 2010	WLW	Leavenworth, Kansas	1	49		
48	Trevor Murdoch	April 23, 2010	WLW	Richmond, Missouri	4	(Note: The title was vacated on an unspecified day in July 2011, putting his reign between 434 and 464 days.)	The title was vacated in July 2011.	
—	Vacated	July, 2011		—	—	—		
49	Brian Breaker	September 18, 2011	WLW	Burlington, Iowa	2	55	Defeated Jason Jones to win the vacated title.	
50	Jason Jones	November 12, 2011	WLW	Richmond, Missouri	1	364		
51	Britton Tucker	November 10, 2012	WLW	Springfield, Missouri	1	28		
52	Jason Jones	December 8, 2012	WLW	Richmond, Missouri	2	170		
–	Vacated	May 27, 2013					Jones begins wrestling under his real name, Leland Race, and vacates the title.	
53	Elvis Aliaga	September 14, 2013	WLW	Richmond, Missouri	1	217	Defeated Leland Race in tournament final.	
54	Leland Race	April 19, 2014	WLW	Richmond, Missouri	3	98	Previously known as Jason Jones.	
55	Ace Steel	July 26, 2014	WLW	Troy, Missouri	1	112		
56	Leland Race	November 15, 2014	WLW	Troy, Missouri	4	364		
57	Trevor Murdoch	November 14, 2015	WLW	Troy, Missouri	5	448		
–	Vacated	2016						
58	Karim Brigante	February 4, 2017	WLW	Troy, Missouri	1	77	Defeated Leland Race and Steve Fender (formerly Superstar Steve) in tournament final.	
59	Leland Race	April 22, 2017	WLW	Richmond, Missouri	5	322		
60	Jon Webb	March 10, 2018	WLW	Moscow Mills, Missouri	1	420		
61	Derek Stone	May 4, 2019	WLW	Troy, Missouri	4	168		
62	Leland Race	October 19, 2019	The Harley Race Memorial Show	Burlington Junction, Missouri	6	14	Special guest Trevor Murdoch counted the pinfall while the referee was unconscious.	
63	Derek Stone	November 2, 2019	Fight Night 4	Troy, Missouri	5	371	The championship was returned to Stone when it was determined that Stone's foot was under the rope during the pinfall on October 19.	
64	Moses Powell	November 7, 2020	WLW	Troy, Missouri	1	707	This was a six-man tag team match between Moses Powell, Leland Race, and Kyle Roberts versus Derek Stone, Jon Webb, and Camaro Jackson.	
65	Steve Fender	October 15, 2022	WLW	Troy, Missouri	3	749	Previously held the belt as Superstar Steve.	
66	Camaro Jackson	November 2, 2024	WLW	Troy, Missouri	1	594+		

== Combined reigns ==
As of June 19, 2026.

†	Indicates the current champion

Rank	Wrestler	No. of reigns	Combined days
1	Leland Race	6	1334
2	Derek Stone	5	852
3	Trevor Murdoch	5	469-
4	Dangerous Derek	2	428
5	Jon Webb	1	420
6	Butch Reed	1	300
7	Wade Chism	5	281
8	Takeshi Morishima	2	262
9	Moses Powell †	1	707
10	Superstar Steve	2	231
11	Elvis Aliaga	1	217
12	Brian Breaker	2	208
13	Griz	2	196
14	Takao Omori	1	175
15	Keith Walker	2	161
16	Dennis McHawes	1	155
17	Camaro Jackson †	1	594+
18	Go Shiozaki	1	118
19	Luminous Warrior	4	112
19	Ace Steel	1	112
21	Rick Steiner	2	111
22	Daniel Cross	1	105
23	Ron Powers	1	78
24	Karim Brigante	1	77
25	Chris Masters	1	76
26	Steve Sharp	1	64
27	Daisuke Ikeda	1	61
28	King Haku	3	58
29	Ron Harris	1	55
30	Steve Anthony	1	50
31	Trent Stone	1	49
31	Jason Bates	1	49
31	Ty Dalton	1	49
34	Britton Tucker	1	28
35	Mr. Destiny	1	13
36	The Barbarian	1	7
