= Chris Masters =

American wrestler (born 1983)

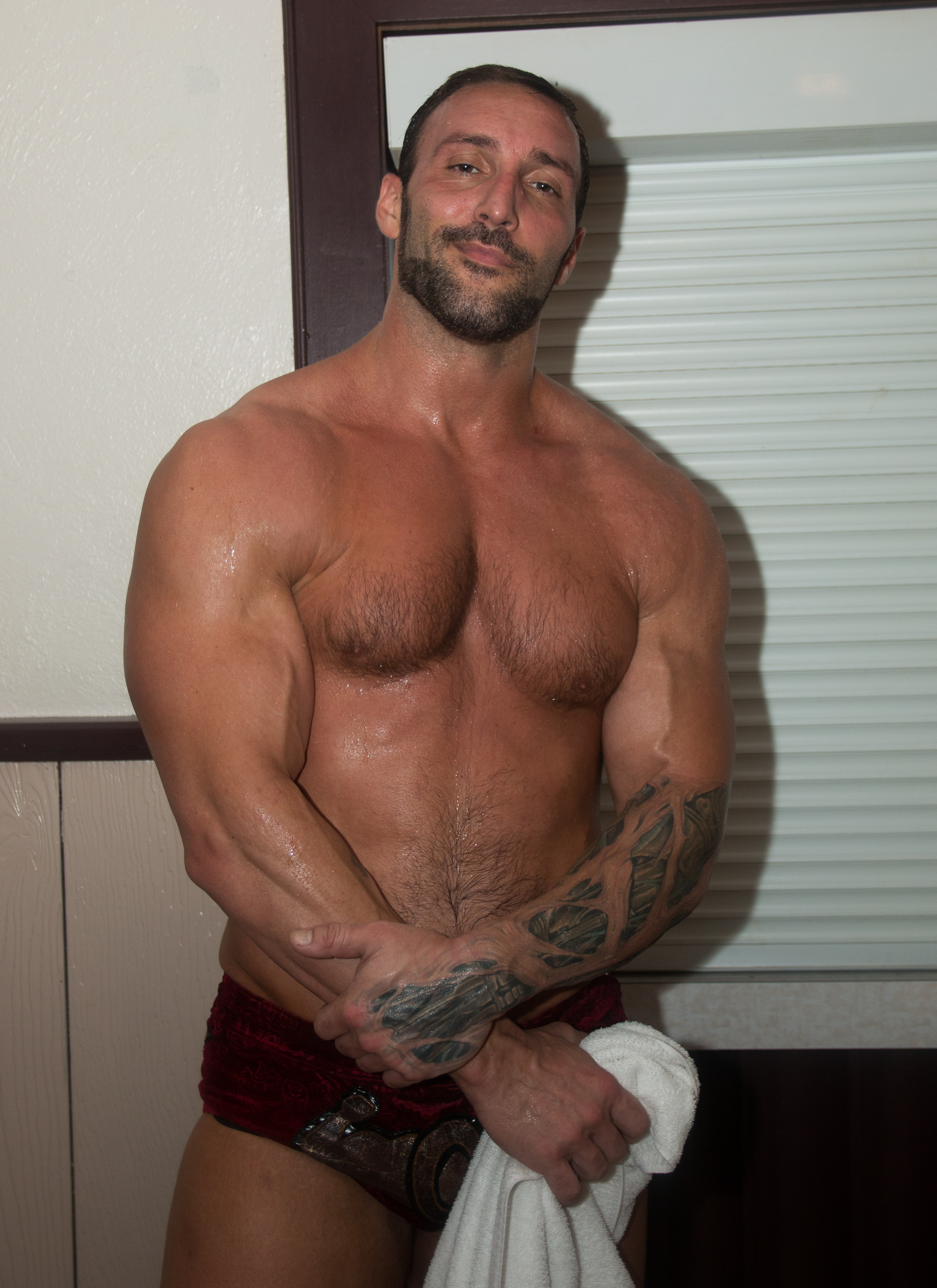
- Masters in 2017

Personal information
- Born: Christopher Todd Mordetzky; January 8, 1983 (age 43) Santa Monica, California, U.S.
- Spouse: Vesela Marinova (m. 2004; div. 2011)

Professional wrestling career
- Ring name(s): American Adonis; Chris Adonis; Chris Masters; Chris Moore; Chris Mordetzky; Concrete
- Billed height: 6 ft 4 in (1.93 m)
- Billed weight: 265 lb (120 kg)
- Billed from: Los Angeles, California
- Trained by: Rick Bassman; Ohio Valley Wrestling; Ultimate Pro Wrestling
- Debut: August 15, 2002

Christopher Todd Mordetzky (born January 8, 1983), better known by the ring name Chris Masters, is an American professional wrestler. He is best known for his time in WWE, under the ring name Chris Masters. He is also known for his time in Impact Wrestling, under the ring name Chris Adonis. He is a former two-time NWA National Heavyweight Champion.

After being trained in Ultimate Pro Wrestling, Mordetzky signed a development contract with WWE and was sent to WWE's farm territory Ohio Valley Wrestling. In 2005, he debuted in WWE as "The Masterpiece" Chris Masters, a wrestler in a great body shape, using "The Masterlock" as finisher, a full nelson hold. During his early career in WWE, Masters had a storyline around the Masterlock, a submission nobody could break. He would challenge several wrestlers to the Masterlock Challenge, where he rewarded the winner with a prize if they could break it. The Masterlock Challenge storyline ended after Bobby Lashley broke the hold on March 20, 2007. Masters was released in 2007 and worked on the independent circuit for two years, making his return to WWE in 2009. Masters would spend the next two years in WWE, until he was released again in 2011. Since then, he has worked on the independent circuit and had notable stints in Global Force Wrestling (GFW) and Total Nonstop Action Wrestling (TNA).

== Early life ==
Christopher Todd Mordetzky was born on January 8, 1983, in Santa Monica, California, to Diane Mordetzky. He is Jewish and of Polish descent. Mordetzky dropped out of high school at the age of sixteen. During this time he idolized professional wrestler Shawn Michaels.

== Professional wrestling career ==
=== Ultimate Pro Wrestling (2002–2003) ===
Mordetzky began training for a wrestling career at the age of 16 in Ultimate Pro Wrestling. He trained there for one year and suffered an injury, leaving him out of action for three months. During this time, Mordetzky learned that WWE was recruiting talent from UPW, and he took time off from wrestling for nearly three years to pursue a powerful physique that would interest World Wrestling Entertainment.

=== World Wrestling Entertainment ===
==== Ohio Valley Wrestling (2003–2005) ====
His work paid off, as WWE offered him a developmental contract in 2003, training him at its developmental territory, Ohio Valley Wrestling (OVW). At OVW, he developed his wrestling skills and refined his character, achieving success in both the singles and tag team divisions. When Mordetzky was called up to the main roster, WWE showed vignettes outlining him as "The Masterpiece", touting him as having a body so perfect, it would appear he was sculpted out of stone. Mordetzky credits Matt Morgan for creating the "Masterpiece" gimmick, and said Vince McMahon encouraged him to emulate former wrestler Paul Orndorff.

==== WWE Championship pursuits (2005–2006) ====
"The Masterpiece" Chris Masters made his debut in WWE on Raw as a villain, drawing attention to his physique in bodybuilding poses during his entrance to the ring. On the February 21, 2005 episode of Raw, Masters made his debut by defeating Stevie Richards. During the contest, Masters broke Richards' nose performing the Polish Hammer. The Polish Hammer continued to be a signature move of Masters' for months after this first match, but with warning that it would only be used in striking an opponent's chest.

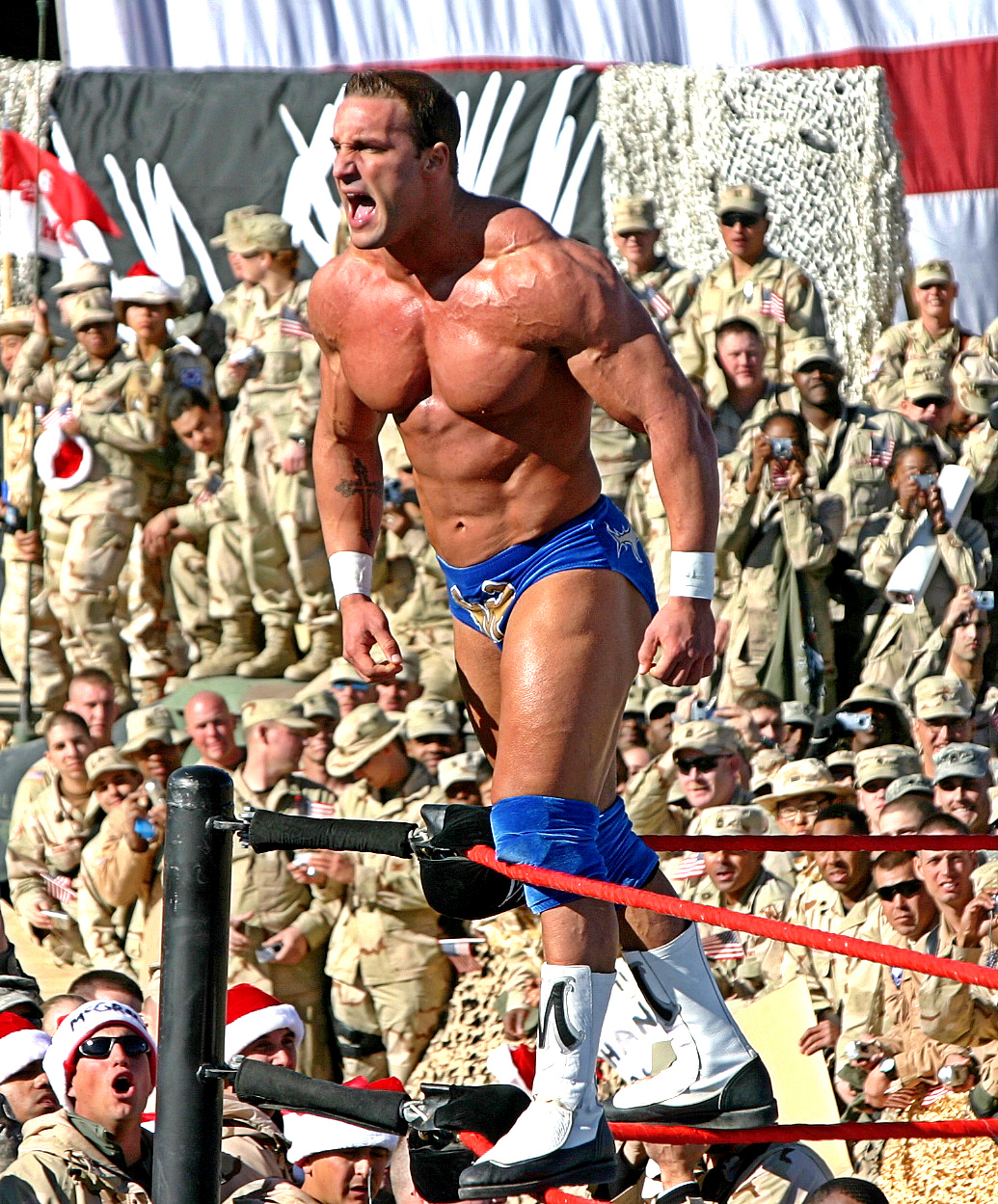
Masters in 2005 at the WWE Tribute to the Troops

Masters made a claim that his version of the full nelson hold, which he dubbed the Master Lock, was unbreakable. Masters began a series of contests he would call "Master Lock Challenges" where Masters would put an opponent in the Master Lock and the opponent would try to break free before Masters made him submit or pass out. Masters would go on to log more full nelson submission victories than any wrestler in WWE history, breaking the record previously held by Kurt Angle. Originally he would call out plants from the crowd, placing a $1,000 prize of his own money to be paid to anyone who could break free from the Master Lock. At Backlash, he defeated Melissa Coates in a Master Lock Challenge. He engaged in feuds with lower-card wrestlers, Val Venis and Sgt. Slaughter, who both failed to break the Master Lock. Using villainous tactics, he often attacked the wrestlers beforehand and frequently cheated (for example using a low-blow to escape Sgt. Slaughter's cobra clutch). Masters increased the offered reward each week up to $20,000 and sometimes threw in a bonus. After defeating the 400-pound Rosey on July 18, Masters defiantly stated "it doesn't matter how big they are!", prompting The Big Show to accept a Master Lock Challenge. In accordance with his villainous persona, Masters fled, refusing a match with the Big Show.

In late August, Masters entered a feud with Shawn Michaels, leading to a tag match between himself and Carlito against Ric Flair and Michaels. During the match, Masters defeated Ric Flair by submission. Masters regularly teamed with Carlito, albeit in a rigid business relationship. Michaels competed in a Master Lock Challenge on September 5. Masters, upset at the vigorous resistance of Michaels, released the hold and beat him with a steel chair before re-applying the hold. The Master Lock Challenge, which had not decided a clear victor between the two, led to a match at Unforgiven which Michaels won.

Masters, alongside fellow Raw wrestler, Edge, was one of several wrestlers to "invade" SmackDown! in preparation for the match between the SmackDown! and Raw brands at Survivor Series. The two ambushed Rey Mysterio, leading to a tag match at Taboo Tuesday against Mysterio and Matt Hardy. Edge chose not to participate, so Masters teamed with Edge's replacement, Gene Snitsky. Masters and Snitsky lost when Mysterio pinned Masters. At Survivor Series, Masters competed in a five-on-five Survivor Series match between SmackDown! and Raw wrestlers. During the match, there appeared to be a near-break in the Master Lock by Bobby Lashley, who "powered out" of the hold. As the hold was never completely locked in, however, the "Master Lock" had not been officially broken. Masters was eliminated by Rey Mysterio.

Masters then set his sights on WWE Champion John Cena, attacking him after a match and forcing him to pass out with the Master Lock. This set up a Triple Threat Submission match for the November 28 edition of Raw with Cena defending his title against Masters and Kurt Angle, with whom he had already been feuding. The idea was to put Cena at a major disadvantage and guarantee a new champion; Masters and Angle, who used the ankle lock as a submission finisher, both were submission experts while Cena did not employ a submission hold as part of his repertoire at the time. On that night, however, Cena emerged victorious by making Masters tap out to his new submission finisher, the STFU.

Masters portrayed the role of a bailiff during the mock trial for then General Manager Eric Bischoff on the December 5 episode of Raw, with WWE Chairman Vince McMahon as judge. Upon being called to the stand to testify for Bischoff's defense, he was asked to give his name, which he did saying his name was Chris Masters. He was immediately accused of perjury and disqualified as a witness, as McMahon broke kayfabe and stated that Masters' real name was Chris Mordetzky.

On December 12, Chris Masters defeated Viscera on an episode of Raw to gain a spot in the Elimination Chamber match for John Cena's WWE Championship at New Year's Revolution. Viscera was shown to be too big to cinch on the Master Lock until being grounded. On the December 26 episode of Raw, Masters faced Chavo Guerrero, in a Beat the Clock match to determine who would be the final entrant to be released from his pod in the Elimination Chamber. Masters had to defeat Guerrero in 5 minutes and 56 seconds, which was the time set by Michaels (when he defeated Snitsky in the opening match of the show). Guerrero managed to survive the Master Lock long enough so that Masters was unable to beat the clock. At New Year's Revolution (which also took place on Masters' 23rd birthday), Masters was eliminated from the Elimination Chamber match when Carlito double-crossed him by delivering a low blow while he had Cena in the Master Lock and then used a roll-up for the pin. On January 9, after some heated words with Carlito, both men had a tag match against two men who were also having difficulties, Kurt Angle and Shawn Michaels. During the match, Michaels walked backstage, leaving Angle to fend for himself. Masters saw the opportunity and applied the Master Lock to Angle, thus gaining the victory. On January 16, Masters challenged Cena to take part in a Master Lock Challenge. Cena accepted the challenge and displayed signs that he might in fact break out of the hold, until Edge attacked Cena with his title belt and ended the challenge.

==== Various feuds and departure (2006–2007) ====
At the Royal Rumble, Masters again worked together with Carlito, but Carlito again double-crossed him and eliminated him from the match. On the February 6 episode of Raw both men were entered into a Road to WrestleMania Tournament, to determine the number one contender for a WWE Championship match at WrestleMania 22. In Masters' first round matchup, he would use the ropes for leverage in a victory against Kane to secure himself a place in the second round against the winner of a later match between Carlito and Rob Van Dam. Van Dam won that match. The next week on Raw, Van Dam was able to beat Masters and advance to the tournament final. After this, Masters continued to feud with one half of the World Tag Team Champions, Big Show, while Masters' on and off teammate Carlito would feud with Kane. On the February 27 episode of Raw, McMahon offered Shawn Michaels' former tag team partner Marty Jannetty a WWE contract in exchange for kissing his exposed buttocks in the middle of the wrestling ring. When Jannetty hesitated, McMahon changed the condition to winning a Master Lock Challenge, and summoned Masters to the ring. After applying the Master Lock, McMahon ordered Masters to force Jannetty's face against his buttocks. Masters failed to complete this instruction as Shawn Michaels interrupted and knocked out Masters. Michaels was then attacked by Shane McMahon, who forced him to kiss Mr. McMahon's buttocks instead. On the March 6 episode of Raw, McMahon publicly thanked everyone who encouraged the previous week's events, and officially awarded Masters and Carlito a World Tag Team Championship match at WrestleMania 22. At WrestleMania 22, the pair, known as "The Masters of Cool", lost the match to Big Show and Kane. The pair argued amongst themselves after the match. Even though Carlito had repeatedly betrayed Masters over the previous months, it was Carlito who turned face. During the next Raw, Masters began to feud with Carlito after Carlito attacked him from behind. This led to a match between the two men at Backlash which Carlito won.

After this, Masters pursued the WWE Intercontinental Championship but would leave for several months to go to drug rehab due to an addiction of painkillers. Before leaving, Masters was on the May 22 episode of Raw, losing a match to John Cena despite low blowing John Cena for two times in a row. He returned to the ring during an OVW television taping on August 6. He had lost much of his muscle mass, appearing much slimmer, although he still had some definition in his arms and abdomen. On the August 28 episode of Raw, Masters made his return against Cena. Along with less muscle mass, he sported a goatee and mustache leading Jerry "The King" Lawler to refer to him as a "leaner and meaner" Chris Masters. This change of image was short-lived, however, as Masters shaved the goatee and regained some of his muscle mass. When Masters returned, he was put in lower-card matches including a short feud with Super Crazy, who had moved from SmackDown!, with Masters coming out on the losing end of their matches. The pair would also compete in a losing effort, along with four other Superstars, in a Six-Pack Challenge for the Intercontinental Championship. Masters gained his first victory since his return against Jerry Lawler on the November 6 episode of Raw in a match where Eric Bischoff, General Manager for the night, forced Lawler to be first handcuffed to the top rope. Masters continued the feud with Lawler for a few weeks with Lawler also losing a Master Lock Challenge before defeating Masters.

On the December 4 episode of Raw, Jonathan Coachman set up a Master Lock Challenge against John Cena for the WWE Championship. Masters appearing to have the challenge won but he released the hold for a short time, allowing Cena to reverse the hold into his own Master Lock, forcing Masters to submit, retaining his title, and making Cena the first to win the Master Lock Challenge. At the start of 2007, Masters would restart his feud with Carlito, which led to several matches between the two. The first was a one-on-one contest at New Year's Revolution won by Masters. In a rematch the next night on Raw, Carlito came out victorious. On the January 15 episode of Raw, Ron Simmons, with interference from Super Crazy, almost "won" the Master Lock Challenge. An attempted Master Lock Challenge for The Great Khali on the February 26 episode of Raw did not occur when Masters was unable to apply the hold to Khali. The Master Lock was first officially broken on the March 19 episode of Raw, by ECW World Champion Bobby Lashley. after Masters debuted it more than two years ago.

In May and June, Masters challenged Santino Marella for the Intercontinental Championship, losing four times via roll-up. However, on the May 28 episode of Raw, he defeated Marella in the Master Lock Challenge.

On the June 11 episode of Raw, Masters was drafted to the SmackDown! brand as part of the 2007 WWE draft. While on SmackDown! he was used sporadically including a few Master Lock Challenges. He had entered into a feud with Chuck Palumbo competing in several matches and an attempted Master Lock Challenge that did not begin as Masters fled the ring after Palumbo realized Masters was trying to trick him. Following this, Masters was suspended for 30 days for failing a drug test. Masters returned to SmackDown! on October 5, applying the Master Lock to Palumbo. Masters suffered a dislocated elbow during his last match, which would have sidelined him for four months. On November 2, 2007, it was reported that Masters had been suspended for 60 days for having violated WWE's Substance Abuse and Drug Policy a second time. Six days later, Masters was released from his WWE contract on November 8, 2007.

=== Independent circuit (2007–2009) ===
On December 20, 2007, Mordetzky made his first wrestling appearance since his departure from WWE, competing under the name Chris Moore for Antonio Inoki's Inoki Genome Federation at the event Genome2: Inoki Fighting Xmas in Tokyo, Japan, defeating Ryuji Yanagisawa. Mordetzky also appeared under his Chris Masters ring name and gimmick at Harley Race's World League Wrestling show on December 29, during a Lumberjack match between Branden Tatum and Dinn T. Moore. Tatum pinned Moore after Masters applied the Master Lock behind the referee's back. He soon won the WLW Heavyweight Championship, his first singles title, on February 9, 2008, from Keith Walker. He later lost the title to Derek McQuinn on May 25. In May 2008, news reports revealed that Mordetzky had signed a one-year contract with Nu-Wrestling Evolution.

Mordetzky wrestled on the independent circuit in Australia and New Zealand appearing for New Zealand Wide Pro Wrestling on April 23, 2009, in Lower Hutt. He defeated Adam Avalanche and Rufguts in a Triple Threat match at the show Power Play 6.

Masters also competed in Europe for American Wrestling Rampage, in the UK for Varsity Pro Wrestling and Puerto Rico for the World Wrestling Council.

=== Return to WWE (2009–2011) ===
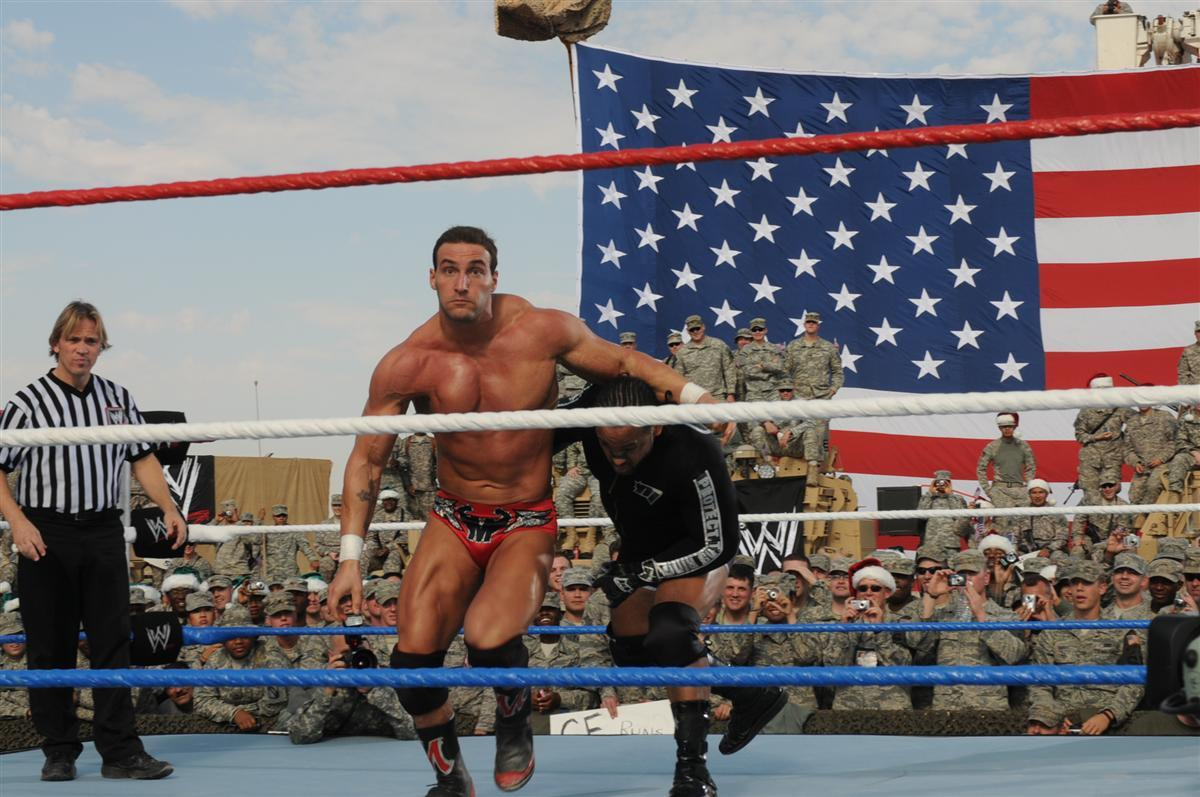
Masters wrestling Montel Vontavious Porter in 2009

Mordetzky returned to World Wrestling Entertainment on July 27, 2009, reprising his character as "The Masterpiece" Chris Masters. He entered the ring with both an abridged Titantron and entrance theme, displaying his signature poses as he walked down the ring. He also used this titantron in 2007. Mordetzky did not take the mic and little commentary was made on his absence. He faced Montel Vontavious Porter in a match that resulted in a double-countout after he applied the Master Lock submission to MVP outside the ring. A mini feud continued between the two as Porter was able to score a pinfall victory over Masters the following week to end the feud.

In November 2009, Mordetzky began teasing a face turn by entertaining fans with a Tony Holland-style pec dance. On the November 2 episode of Raw, Mordetzky entered the Raw's Got Talent show hosted by guest host Ozzy Osbourne, Sharon Osbourne, and The Great Khali, where he performed a "special performance art piece"; he flexed his pecs to the beat of Ozzy's song "Crazy Train", earning a positive crowd reaction. Masters later recalled that he was not a fan of the "pec dancing" gimmick, but made the best of it for the company. On the December 7 episode of Raw, Masters cemented his face turn by saving Eve Torres and Hornswoggle from Chavo Guerrero after confronting and applying the Master Lock on Guerrero. After that, Masters and Torres began an on-screen relationship.

Masters mostly engaged in lower-card feuds throughout 2010 and 2011. Some wrestling journalists have speculated that his character was being reduced to a comedic role because WWE hoped to avoid negative publicity tied to his past Talent and Wellness Violations. Following WrestleMania XXVI, Masters was not active on-screen for over 30 days.

Masters was drafted to the SmackDown brand on April 26 during the Supplemental Draft. In his first match on the brand, he defeated Chavo Guerrero. Masters found himself lossless in singles matches from May to September, winning eleven singles matches during that period, where all the matches took place on Superstars. Masters was announced as one of the men to compete in the Traditional Survivor Series Elimination Tag Team match as part of Team Mysterio, teaming with Rey Mysterio, Big Show, Kofi Kingston and Montel Vontavious Porter to take on Team Del Rio (Alberto Del Rio, Tyler Reks, Jack Swagger, Drew McIntyre and "Dashing" Cody Rhodes). On the November 19 episode of SmackDown, Masters lost to Swagger in a Survivor Series Showdown match. Later that same night, he competed in a 10-Man Survivor Series Showdown Battle Royal where he eliminated Rhodes, though later on in the match he was eliminated, the Battle Royal was won by Mysterio and Big Show (as it was a team vs team battle royal). At the Survivor Series pay-per-view, Masters was eliminated by Del Rio, but his team still went on to win. In late 2010, Masters mentored Byron Saxton on NXT. In February and March 2011, Masters would feud with Tyler Reks on Superstars, and Masters won all four matches they had with each other. A push and possible gimmick change was rumored, but never materialized.

On April 26, 2011, Masters was drafted back to the Raw brand as part of the 2011 supplemental draft but never wrestled on Raw in his four months as a Raw wrestler. His last appearance on WWE programming was against Jack Swagger on the August 4, 2011 episode of Superstars in a losing effort. On August 5, 2011, Masters was released from WWE. His release (as well as the releases of Vladimir Kozlov and David Hart Smith) was mentioned in a worked shoot segment on the August 8 episode of Raw by then-WWE Champion CM Punk.

=== Return to independent circuit (2011–present) ===
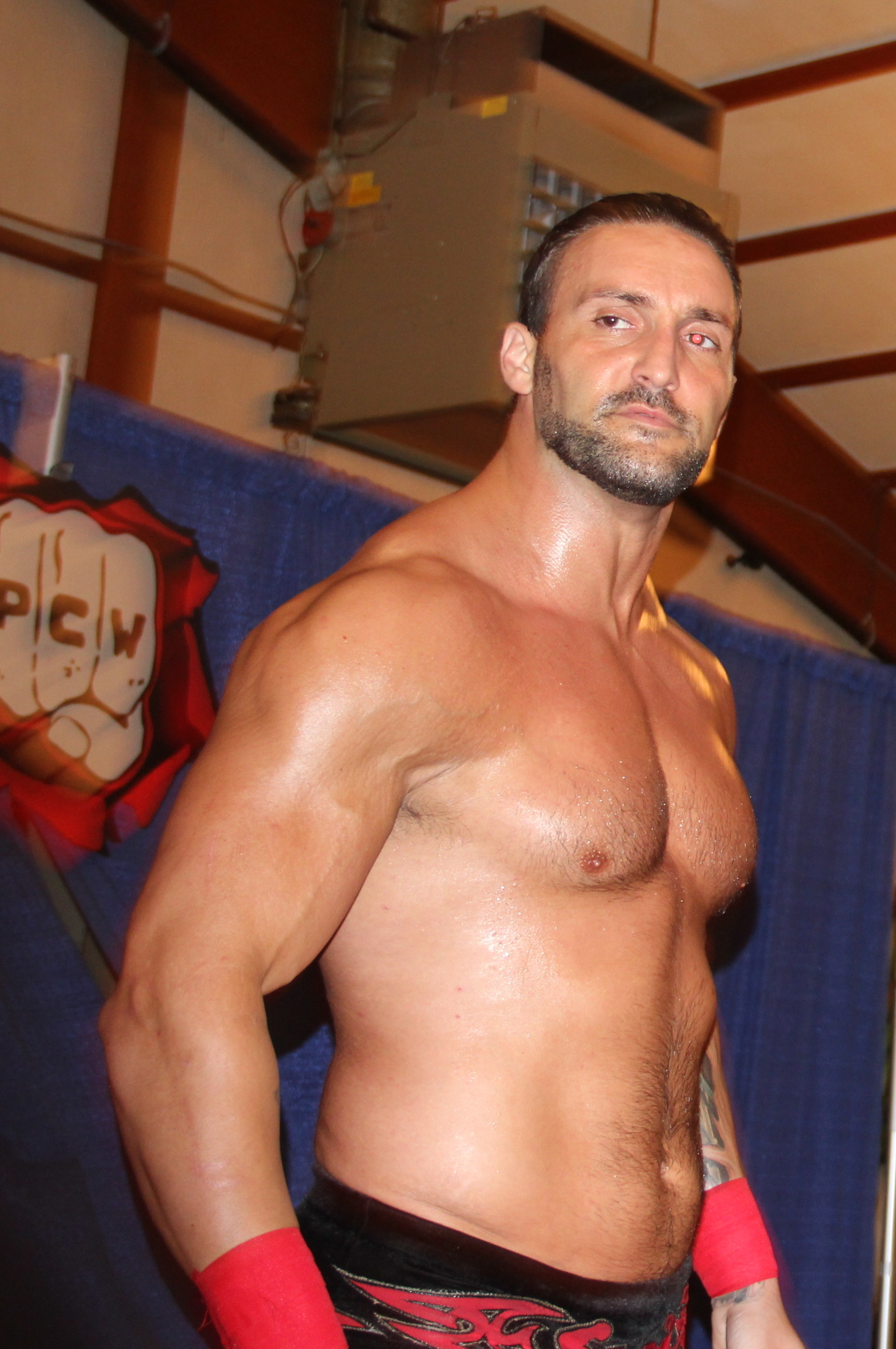
Masters during a Preston City Wrestling (PCW) event.

In December 2011, Mordetzky joined the Ring Ka King promotion, a branch of Total Nonstop Action Wrestling for India under the name American Adonis. There he defeated Roscoe Jackson, but was defeated by Indian wrestler Mahabali Veera. In December 2011, Mordetzky was also revealed to be involved in the Wrestling Retribution Project under the ring name "Concrete". Mordetzky appeared on the World Wrestling Fan Xperience (WWFX) Champions Showcase Tour in Manila, Philippines on February 4, 2012, where he wrestled under the name Chris Master. There he was defeated against fellow WWE alumni MVP. In April 2012, Mordetzky participated in the Revolution event for International Pro Wrestling: United Kingdom (IPW:UK) in London. Other wrestlers at the event were WWE Tough Enough Season 5 contestant Matt Cross and WWE alumni and friend Carlito.

In June 2012, Mordetzky was defeated by Robbie E in a dark match for Impact Wrestling. Mordetzky has also been involved in many other wrestling events since his release from WWE such as Southside Wrestling (UK) beating El Ligero, Dutch Pro Wrestling (DPW), Fire Star Pro Wrestling, Big Time Wrestling (BTW), World Star Wrestling (WSW), Vendetta Pro Wrestling and Tommy Dreamer's House Of Hardcore (HOH). On October 26, 2012, Masters was defeated by Matt Hardy in the Big Time Wrestling 16th Anniversary Show. On October 27, 2012, Masters defeated Rik Luxury, Sean Casey and then-Champion Chavo Guerrero Jr. in a Four-Way Elimination match for the Vendetta Pro Wrestling Heavyweight Championship.

On December 9, 2012, Masters made his Preston City Wrestling (PCW) debut losing to Kris Travis at PCW Festive Fury 2012. On March 1, 2014, Masters won the Road to Glory Tournament, earning the right to a match for the PCW Heavyweight Championship. On August 1, 2014, Masters defeated Joey Hayes to become PCW Heavyweight Champion at Preston City Wrestling's third anniversary show with Lionheart as the special referee.

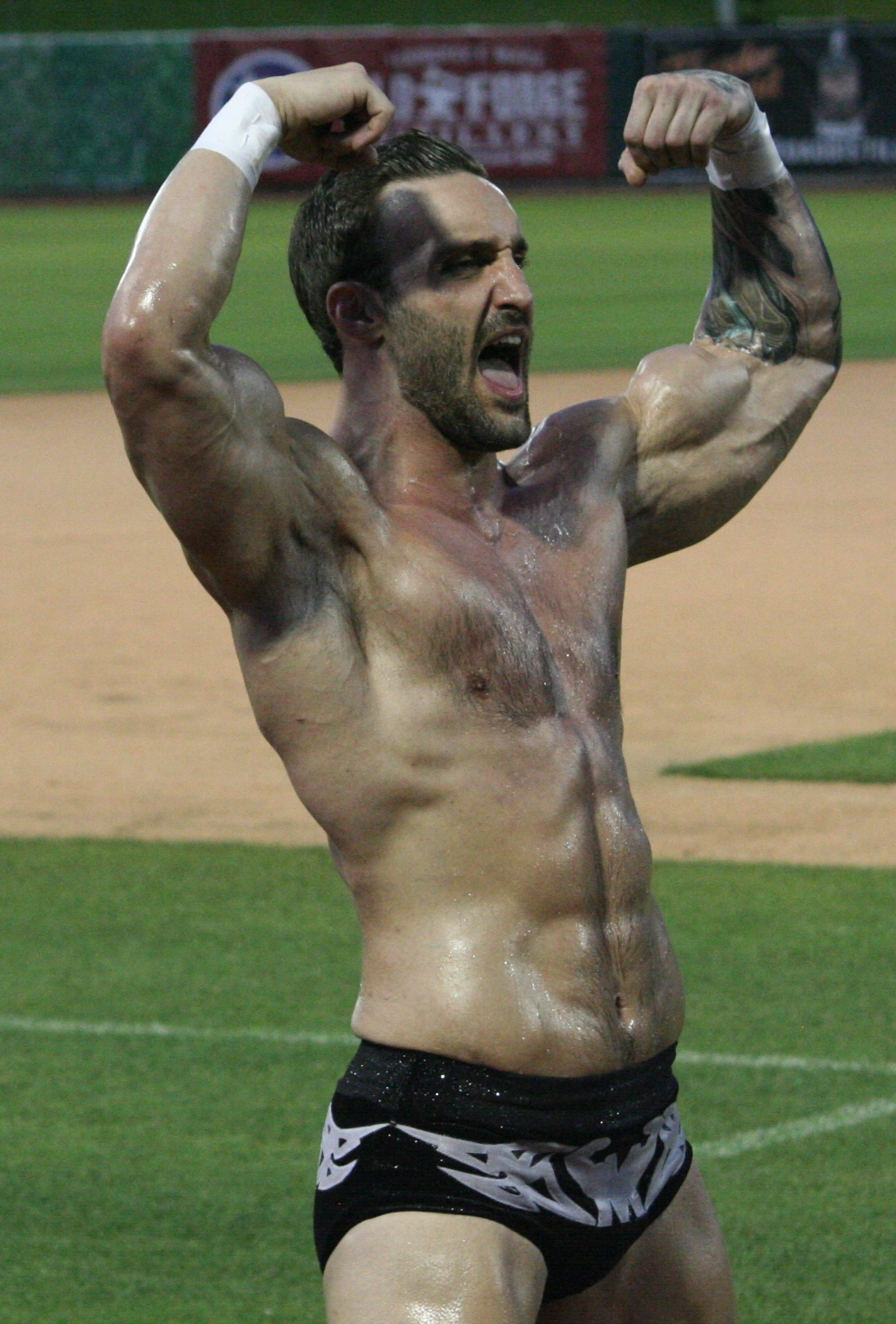
Masters at a GFW event in 2015

On April 20, 2013, Masters unsuccessfully challenged Rob Conway for the NWA World Heavyweight Championship. On January 24, 2014, Masters won the Real Canadian Wrestling (RCW) Canadian Heavyweight Championship. Masters lost the title the next day. On March 29, 2014, at International Wrestling Federation's Breaking Ground, Masters was defeated by Chris Hero. On June 26 Masters defeated Ken Kerbis & Kronus in a triple threat match for the AWO Championship at the All Wrestling Organization annual show Wrestlefest in Tira, Israel. On 1 November 2014, Masters faced 'The One' Simon Lancaster at the RDW 10th Anniversary Show, the match ended in a draw when the RDW champion, Spyda, attacked both men. Masters then went on to aid Lancaster in a match against Spyda, winning Lancaster the championship. On May 6, 2015, Global Force Wrestling (GFW) announced Mordetzky as part of their roster. He made his debut for the promotion on June 12, defeating Dustin Starr.

On November 29, 2014, Masters lost the PCW Heavyweight Championship in a three-way elimination match to Uhaa Nation during a PCW/ROH Supershow of Honor event the match also included Dave Mastiff. On March 14, 2015, Masters defeated Uhaa Nation in a loser leaves PCW no disqualification match to regain the PCW Heavyweight Championship at PCW Road To Glory 2015. On July 11, 2015, Masters lost the PCW Heavyweight Championship to Dave Mastiff at the PCW Tribute To The Troops 2 event.

=== Total Nonstop Action Wrestling / Impact Wrestling (2015–2018) ===
In 2015, Mordetzky initially made his Total Nonstop Action Wrestling (TNA) debut on the July 27, 2015 episode of Impact Wrestling, where he competed in a King of the Mountain match for the vacant TNA King of the Mountain Championship. Robbie E, Eric Young, Lashley and the winner of the match, P. J. Black were the other participants. On the following Impact Wrestling the Global Force stable cut a promo in the ring challenging TNA. Mordetzky took the microphone and demanded a TNA opponent, revealed to be Lashley. The match ended in a "no contest" after the Global Force stable interrupted the match. On the September 9th episode of Impact Wrestling, Mordetzky defeated Drew Galloway in a Lumberjack match. On the September 16 edition of Impact Wrestling, Team GFW (Mordetzky, Brian Myers, Jeff Jarrett, Eric Young and Sonjay Dutt) lost to Team TNA (Drew Galloway, Lashley, Eddie Edwards, Bram and Davey Richards) in a Lethal Lockdown match.

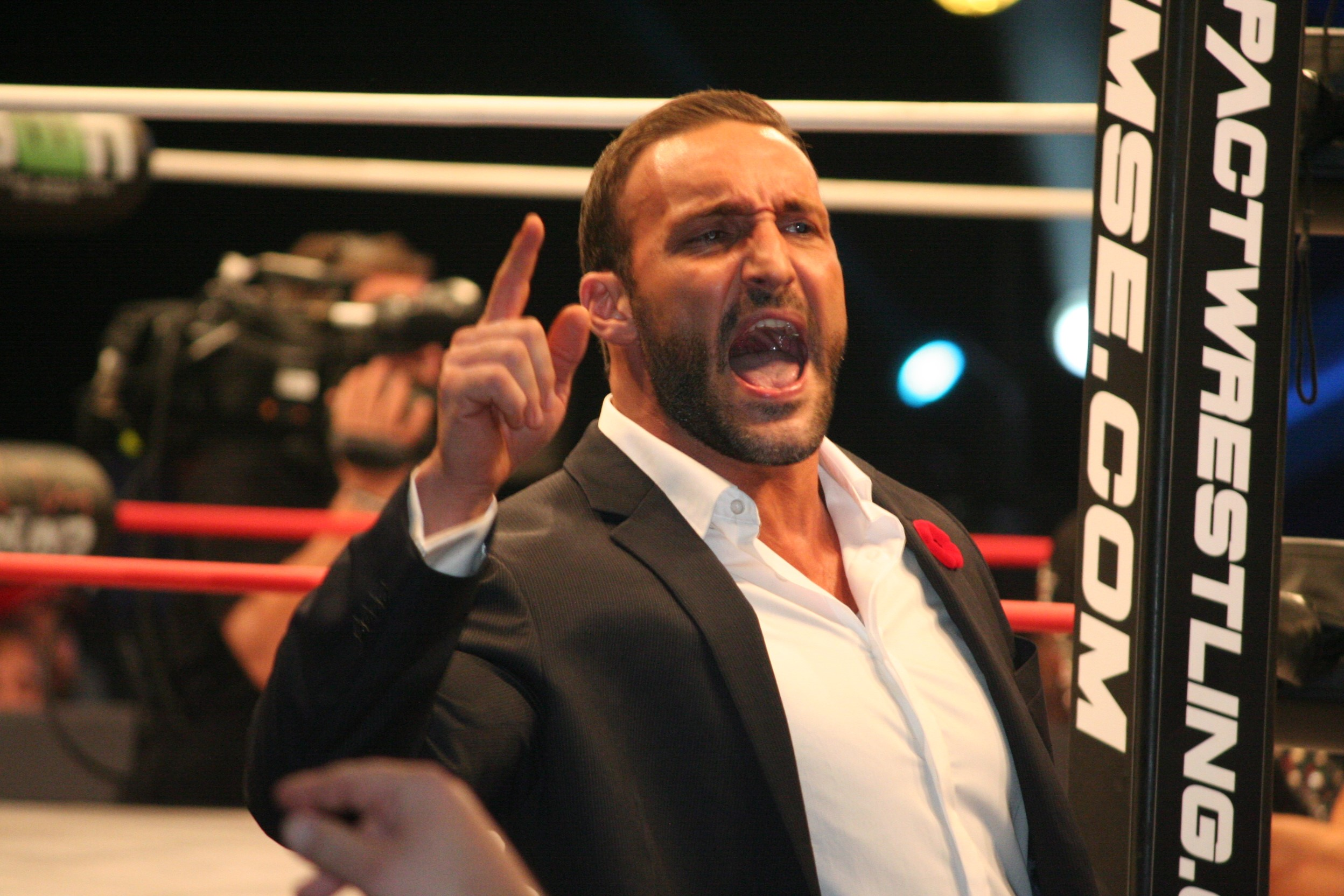
Chris Adonis in November 2017

On the April 6 episode of Impact, Mordetzky returned to TNA, now known as Impact Wrestling under the ring name Chris Adonis. In his debut he competed in an eight-man tag team match by teaming with Matt Morgan, Magnus and Alberto El Patron against Lashley, Bram, Eli Drake and Tyrus in a winning effort. On the April 20 episode of Impact, Adonis attacked Moose from behind, establishing himself as a heel in the process. During the following weeks, Adonis formed an alliance with Drake against Moose. On the June 8 episode of Impact, Adonis lost a GFW Global Title Match to Alberto El Patron. At Slammiversary XV, Adonis and Drake were defeated by Moose and DeAngelo Williams.

Afterwards, he frequently helped Drake to retain his Impact Global Championship. On the July 27 episode of Impact, Adonis, Eli Drake and Ethan Carter III defeated Eddie Edwards, Naomichi Marufuji and Moose in a six-man tag team match. On August 24, on Impact, Adonis competed in the Gauntlet for the Gold match for the GFW Global Championship, which Drake won. Adonis and Drake then transitioned into a storyline with Johnny Impact, facing him in tag team and singles matches. On January 13, 2018, Mordetzky officially confirmed on his Twitter account that he had officially parted ways with Impact Wrestling. According to Mordetzsky, he left the promotion due to the low salary and the fact that the company did not have any plans for him besides being a manager for Eli Drake.

=== National Wrestling Alliance (2021–2023) ===
==== NWA National Championship (2021–2023) ====
On March 12, National Wrestling Alliance announced on their social media, that Mordetzky would make his NWA debut at NWA Back For The Attack. Adonis defeated Trevor Murdoch on the March 30 episode of NWA Power, in a No Disqualification match, to win the NWA National Championship. After this, Adonis turned heel when he aligned with Thom Latimer and NWA World Heavyweight Champion Nick Aldis, as the new member of Strictly Business.

On May 25, 2021, Adonis vacated the NWA National Championship to participate in the battle royal to receive an NWA World Heavyweight Championship match at NWA When Our Shadows Fall; the match was won by Trevor Murdoch. Adonis would defeat JTG in the tournament final to win the National Championship. At NWA 73rd Anniversary Show, Adonis successfully defended his title in his first title defense against James Storm. He would lose the title against Anthony Mayweather on the February 11, 2022 episode of Power, ending his reign at 249 days.

==== Championship pursuits (2023) ====
On the February 28, 2023 episode of Powerrr, Adonis announced that he will utilize his Champions Series title opportunities at NWA 312, challenging NWA Worlds Heavyweight Champion Tyrus. He would then go on to unsuccessfully challenge Tyrus for the NWA World Heavyweight Championship. On June 3, during night one of the Crockett Cup, Adonis teamed with Tyrus under the name "The Midnight Riders" to compete in the namesake tournament, defeating The Warriors from the Wasteland (Judais and Max the Impaler) in the second round, and The Immortals (Kratos and Odinson) in the quarterfinal but lost to Knox and Murdoch (Mike Knox and Trevor Murdoch) in the semifinal.

During Adonis and Latimer's match against Knox and Murdoch on the August 22, 2023 episode of Powerrr, Adonis turned on Latimer and attacked him, thus giving Knox and Murdoch the victory. At NWA 75th Anniversary Show, Adonis was unsuccessful at winning the NWA World Television Championship. On the October 17 Powerrr, Adonis defeated Zyon by disqualification to earn an opportunity at "Thrillbilly" Silas Mason's NWA National Heavyweight Championship at Samhain in a Burning Lake Brawl. At the event, Adonis unsuccessfully challenged Mason for the NWA National Heavyweight Championship.

== Legacy ==
Known for his large body reaching 270 lbs, he was listed among the "Most Freakishly Muscular WWE Superstars of All Time" by the Bleacher Report. WhatCulture observed that Masters "had one of the most impressive WWE physiques of all time when he debuted in 2005", "[...] like another version of Batista or Lex Luger, only even bigger." In the official write-up for the World Wrestling Entertainment website, Masters’ physique has been called "the kind of you usually only seen in comic books", and he was praised for his "unbelievable build and his devastating finishing maneuver". In addition, the organization noted that "although he parted ways with WWE in 2011, 'The Masterpiece' more than lived up to his self-aggrandizing nickname as one of the most impressive physical specimens in WWE history."

Writing for The Sportster, Matthew Wilkinson ranked Masters at number three on his list of the ten WWE wrestlers with the most incredible physiques, writing that "while he was completely jacked all across his body, there’s no doubt that his pectoral muscles were the highlight of his physique." Wilkinson added that Masters was known for his wrestling entrances when he flexed and "did pectoral dances to amuse fans, which also proved how impressive his body was," a sentiment shared by Travis Wakeman from TNT Sports, who thought that the wrestler was memorable because of his "great physique, as well as an arrogant personality". IGN's Greg Miller praised Masters as a WWE Superstar, and wrote: "Carving an impressive body out of muscle, there is no denying that Masters is truly a masterpiece. Flaunting his self-proclaimed flawless physique, 'The Masterpiece' has quickly made a name for himself as a top up and coming Superstar, and his impressive power has forced many top WWE Superstars to submit to his devastating Master Lock finisher along the way." In 2016, fitness-related site Gym Junkies highlighted that "Chris Masters’ physique was unmatched. It was as though he was chiseled out of granite."

== Personal life ==
Mordetzky has stated that Ultimate Warrior and Shawn Michaels were two of his favorite wrestlers while growing up. When asked what it was like wrestling Michaels, he replied, "It was a dream come true. That's something I'll take with me to my grave. He was my childhood idol, I idolize the guy, and I still trip out that I got to wrestle him on a pay-per-view. How many people get to do that? How many people get to wrestle their idol?"

Mordetzky claims that the biggest misconception that most people have about him is that he is just a bodybuilder.

Mordetzky is good friends with current WWE wrestler Randy Orton, and fellow WWE alumni Carlito, Bobby Lashley, Shelton Benjamin, John Morrison, Chavo Guerrero Jr., and Rob Van Dam. He has appeared on both Van Dam's radio show RVD-Radio and internet-based reality television show RVD-TV. The Wrestling Observer Newsletter reported that Vince McMahon only re-hired Masters in 2009 at the recommendation of Randy Orton.

In March 2013, Mordetzky saved his mother's life from a neighbor who held her hostage and committed arson at her home. It was reported that he had pulled a 10 foot (3.0 m) tree from the ground with his bare hands and used it to open a path to his mother's windows, freeing her.

== Filmography ==
Year	Title	Role	Ref.
2010	Big Time Rush	Himself	
2011	Silent Library	Himself	

== Championships and accomplishments ==
- All-Star Wrestling Australia
  - ASWA Eastern States Championship (1 time)
- All Wrestling Organization
  - AWO Heavyweight Championship (1 time)
- Championship Of Wrestling
  - cOw Interstate Championship (1 time)
- Championship Wrestling From Arizona
  - Arizona Heavyweight Championship (1 time)
- Continental Wrestling Entertainment
  - CWE Heavyweight Championship (1 time)
- DDT Pro-Wrestling
  - Ironman Heavymetalweight Championship (1 time)
- Dungeon Wrestling
  - Stu Hart Heritage Championship (1 time)
- National Wrestling Alliance
  - NWA National Championship (2 times)
  - NWA National Championship Tournament (2021)
  - NWA Champions Series Tournament (2023) – with Ricky Morton, Kerry Morton, Taya Valkyrie, Madi Wrenkowski, Jennacide, Mims, Dak Draper and Alex Taylor Willoughby
- New Tradition Lucha Libre
  - NTLL Gladiator Championship (1 time)
- Northland Wrestling
  - Northland Wrestling King Of The North Championship (1 time)
- Ohio Valley Wrestling
  - OVW Southern Tag Team Championship (1 time) – with Brent Albright
- Preston City Wrestling
  - PCW Heavyweight Championship (2 times)
  - Road To Glory Tournament (2014)
- Pro Wrestling Illustrated
  - Ranked No. 89 of the top 500 singles wrestlers in the PWI 500 in 2007
- Qatar Pro Wrestling
  - QPW Tag Team Championship (1 time) – with Carlito
- Real Canadian Wrestling
  - RCW Canadian Heavyweight Championship (1 time)
- Rome Wrestling Federation
  - RWF Heavyweight Championship (1 time)
- Ultimate Kombat Wrestling Association
  - UKWA Tag Team Championship (1 time) - with Mexxberg
- Vendetta Pro Wrestling
  - Vendetta Pro Heavyweight Championship (1 time)
- World Association of Wrestling
  - WAW Undisputed World Heavyweight Championship (1 time)
- World League Wrestling
  - WLW Heavyweight Championship (1 time)
- World Wrestling Council
  - WWC Universal Heavyweight Championship (1 time)
- WrestleSport
  - WrestleSport Heavyweight Championship (1 time)
