= Silent Library =

American game show

- Genre: Game show
- Presented by: Zero Kazama
- Country of origin: United States
- Original language: English
- No. of seasons: 4
- No. of episodes: 89 (list of episodes)

Production
- Executive producer: Adam Dolgins
- Running time: 20 minutes

Original release
- Network: MTV
- Release: June 15, 2009 – May 13, 2011

Silent Library is an American television game show that aired on MTV from June 15, 2009 to May 13, 2011. The series is based on one of the segments in the popular Japanese variety show Downtown no Gaki no Tsukai ya Arahende!!

The series was renewed for a 20-episode second season, which premiered on January 11, 2010 and featured celebrities such as the cast of Jersey Shore, All Time Low, Jim Jones, We The Kings, Ron Jeremy, Naked Cowboy, Asher Roth, This or the Apocalypse, Forever the Sickest Kids, Jessie James, Aubrey O'Day and Justin Bieber competing as contestants and appearing in humiliating punishment challenges.

The series' third season premiered on June 28, 2010. The bands Patent Pending, All Time Low, Stereo Skyline, Hey Monday, Anarbor, NeverShoutNever, Honor Society, New Boyz and Iyaz have appeared as contestants, as did members of the New York Giants NFL team and the cast of the MTV original series The Hard Times of R.J. Berger.

The fourth season premiered on March 28, 2011. The cast of Jersey Shore, The Ready Set, Judah Friedlander, Jimmy Fallon & The Roots, players from the New York Giants, 3OH!3 and Superstars from the WWE all competed as contestants.

MTV cancelled the show on November 9, 2011.

== Play ==
The set is constructed to resemble a typical public library. A team of six players sits at a study table, three on each side, with host Zero Kazama sitting nearby at the circulation desk next to the entrance. Six cards are placed facedown on the table, and each player picks one and flips it over. Typically, five of the cards are green and marked "Safe"; the sixth, which is yellow and marked with a black skull and crossbones, means that its holder must endure a bizarre "punishment" challenge. In some cases during the second season, five of the six cards show the skull and crossbones, leaving only one player safe.

While the challenge is in progress, an on-screen gauge (resembling a sound level meter) indicates the amount of noise made by the team. If the noise level goes into the gauge's red zone at any time, the team automatically loses the challenge. Only afterward does Kazama inform the team of their success or failure in this respect, as they are unaware of the gauge's readings. The team will also lose if they fail to achieve the objective of the challenge.

The game is played in four rounds, with three challenges in each of the first three rounds and one in the fourth. Successful challenges in rounds 1, 2, 3, and 4 earn $300, $400, $800 and $1,000 for the team, respectively (or for the team's chosen charity in a celebrity episode). All winnings are split equally among the six players, and Kazama pays them off as they exit the library at the end of the show. A disclaimer during the end credits states that the team may have played additional challenges that were not aired, and thus may have won more money than the total shown at the end of the episode.

== Episodes ==
Season	Episodes	Originally released	
Season	Episodes	First released	Last released
1	19	June 15, 2009	July 9, 2009
2	20	January 11, 2010	February 12, 2010
3	20	June 28, 2010	August 5, 2010
4	30	March 28, 2011	May 13, 2011

== International editions ==
Channel 5 made a British version for their 5* channel in 2011, which lasted 6 episodes and had a Big Brother celebrity special, including former housemates Marcus Akin, Brian Belo, Josie Gibson, Sam Pepper, Spencer Smith and Glyn Wise.

== Footnotes ==
- Dowd, Rachael (June 16, 2020). "Here's where you can watch All Time Low's 'Silent Library' episode". Alternative Press. Archived from the original on April 30, 2022.
- Denette, Kelsey (March 3, 2011). "MTV's 'Silent Library' Returns 3/28 with the Cast of Jersey Shore". BroadwayWorld. Archived from the original on April 30, 2022.
- Tanzer, Myles (April 24, 2018). "Please reboot Silent Library already. A gameshow that's perfect for the internet in 2018". The Fader. Archived from the original on April 30, 2022.
- Altobelli, Lisa (June 25, 2010). "Giants players appear on 'Silent Library'". ESPN. Archived from the original on April 30, 2022.
- Tanzos, Tara (June 24, 2009). "MTV's 'Silent Library' game show includes contestants from Wilson". The Express-Times. Archived from the original on April 30, 2022.
- McDowell, Bob (July 20, 2010). "Six locals brave sick tricks for MTV". New Castle News. Archived from the original on April 30, 2022.
- Federico, Kelly (February 9, 2010). "Kutztown U. students on MTV's 'Silent Library'". The Morning Call.
