= Ron Powers (wrestler) =

American professional wrestler (born 1967)

Personal information
- Born: Ronald Powers; November 22, 1967 (age 58) St. Louis, Missouri, U.S.

Professional wrestling career
- Ring name(s): Ron Powers; Brody Powers; The New Bruiser Brody; Ronnie Twist; Aries
- Billed height: 6 ft 5 in (1.96 m)
- Billed weight: 255 lb (116 kg)
- Trained by: Harley Race
- Debut: 1986
- Retired: 2024

Ron Powers (born November 22, 1967) is an American professional wrestler for working in the World Championship Wrestling, New Japan Pro Wrestling and various Missouri promotions.

== Professional wrestling career ==
Powers made his wrestling in 1986. In 1991, Powers wrestled a couple of matches for World Championship Wrestling. He defeated Jody Hamilton in a house show.

In August 1992, he wrestled a couple for matches for the World Wrestling Federation. He defeated Joey Maggs in a TV taping for Wrestling Challenge.

From August to October 1992, Powers worked as Brody Powers in Texas for Global Wrestling Federation.

In November 1992, Powers went to Japan for New Japan Pro Wrestling's Wrestling Scramble 1992 where participated in tag matches. He would team with Tony Halme, Scott Norton and Masanobu Kurisu.

== Championships and accomplishments ==
- Mid-Missouri Wrestling Alliance
  - MMWA Heavyweight Championship (2 times)
- Missouri Wrestling Federation / Midwest Wrestling Federation
  - MWF Heavyweight Championship (1 time)
- Pro Wrestling Illustrated
  - PWI ranked him # 375 of the 500 best singles wrestlers of the PWI 500 in 1992
- Southern Illinois Championship Wrestling
  - SICW Classic Championship (2 times)
- Windy City Wrestling
  - WCW Heavyweight Championship (1 time)
- World League Wrestling
  - WLW Heavyweight Championship (1 time)
