= Tanyka Renee =

American health and fitness journalist

- Born: January 18, 1986 (age 40); New Britain, Connecticut, U.S.
- Occupations: Playboy model, former pro athlete, health and fitness journalist, holistic nutritionist.
- Years active: 2008–present
- Website: tanykarenee.com

Tanyka Renee (born January 18, 1986) is an American health and fitness journalist, author, Playboy model, former pro-athlete, and holistic nutritionist.

Renee played with the LFL as defensive and offensive lineman for the NY Majesty and The Philadelphia Passion. She appeared as a featured cast member on MTV's Lingerie Football.

== Career ==
Past media appearances include Playboy, Rachael Ray, Fox News, and JET.

Complex Magazine ranked Renee third on its list of "The 10 Hottest Women of the 2011 Lingerie Football League Finals." In 2012, The Bleacher Report included her in their "The 50 Prettiest Faces in Sports."

Renee currently serves as the deputy editor for Bombshell by Bleu. Previously, she was a contributing writer for Heart and Soul and Jones Magazine.

Her first book, "The Complete Guide to a Sexier Backside," was published in early 2015.
