= Survivor Series (2006) =

World Wrestling Entertainment pay-per-view event

- Promotional poster of Big Show, John Cena, and King Booker on a skull
- Promotion: World Wrestling Entertainment
- Brand(s): Raw; SmackDown! ECW
- Date: November 26, 2006
- City: Philadelphia, Pennsylvania
- Venue: Wachovia Center
- Attendance: 15,400
- Buy rate: 383,000

Pay-per-view chronology
← Previous; Cyber Sunday	Next → December to Dismember

Survivor Series chronology
← Previous; 2005	Next → 2007

The 2006 Survivor Series was a professional wrestling pay-per-view (PPV) event produced by World Wrestling Entertainment (WWE). It was the 20th annual Survivor Series and took place on November 26, 2006, at the Wachovia Center in Philadelphia, Pennsylvania, held for wrestlers from the promotion's Raw, SmackDown!, and ECW brand divisions. This was the first Survivor Series to include the ECW brand after its introduction earlier that year in May. The event centered on the Survivor Series match, a tag team elimination match that pits teams of multiple wrestlers against each other.

Three Survivor Series matches were held on the card. The main event was the main match on the SmackDown! brand, in which defending champion King Booker faced Batista in a Last Chance match for the World Heavyweight Championship, which Batista won. The main match on the Raw and ECW brands was a Survivor Series match in which Team Cena (John Cena, Bobby Lashley, Kane, Sabu, and Rob Van Dam) defeated Team Big Show (Big Show, Test, Finlay, MVP, and Umaga). The primary match on the undercard for the SmackDown! brand was Chris Benoit versus Chavo Guerrero for the WWE United States Championship, which Benoit won. Additionally, Mickie James defeated Lita in Lita's retirement match to win Raw's WWE Women's Championship. Another main match on the card saw Team DX (Triple H, Shawn Michaels, Jeff Hardy, CM Punk, and Matt Hardy) defeat Team Rated-RKO (Edge, Randy Orton, Johnny Nitro, Mike Knox, and Gregory Helms) in a Survivor Series match. This marked the first time since the brand extension was created that wrestlers from different brands wrestled on the same Survivor Series teams.

== Production ==
=== Background ===
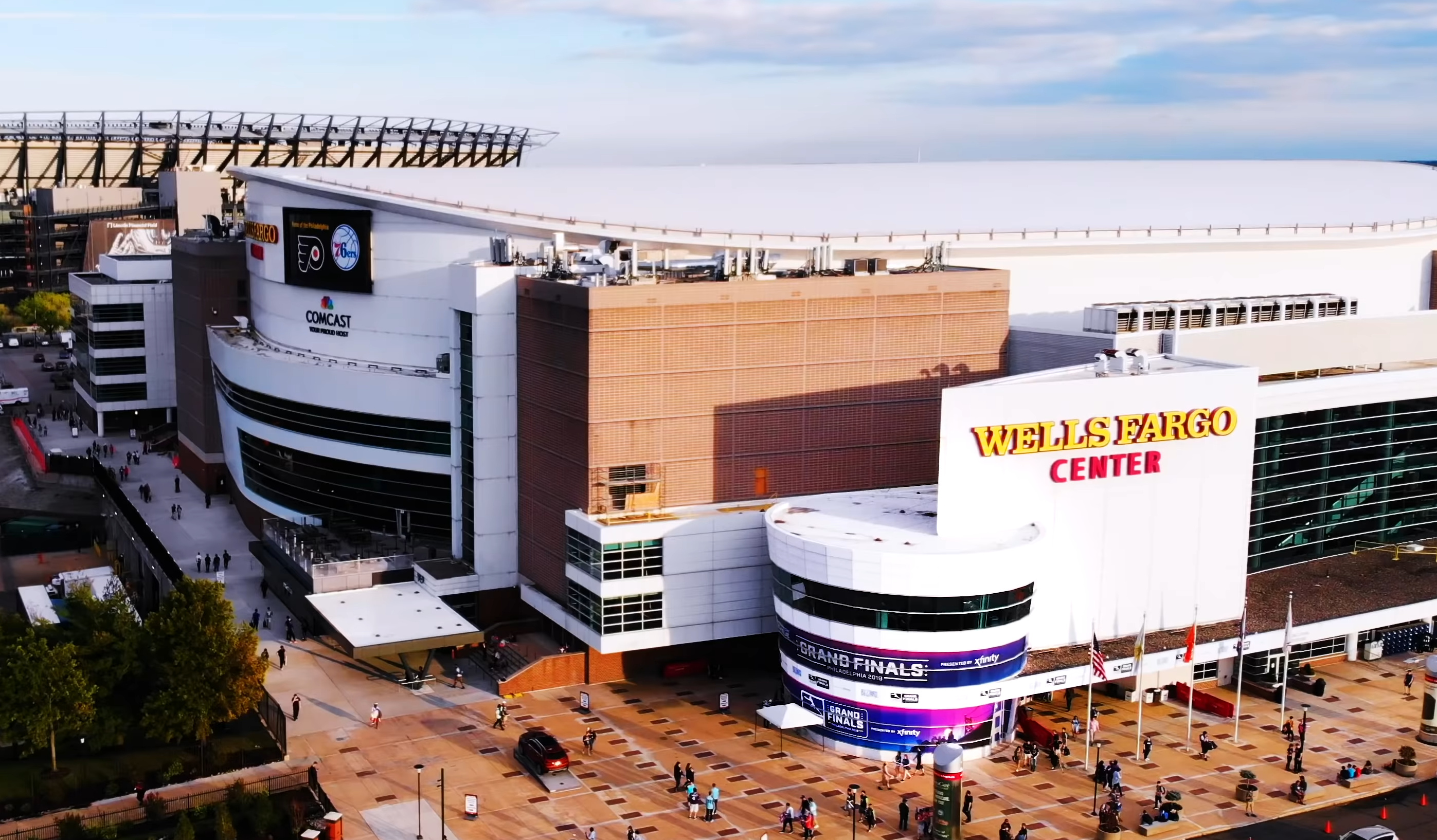
The 20th annual Survivor Series was held at the Wachovia Center in Philadelphia, Pennsylvania.

Survivor Series is an annual professional wrestling pay-per-view (PPV) event, produced every November by World Wrestling Entertainment (WWE) since 1987, generally held around Thanksgiving in the United States. In what has become the second longest-running pay-per-view event in history (behind WWE's WrestleMania), it is one of the promotion's original four pay-per-views, along with WrestleMania, SummerSlam, and Royal Rumble, referred to as the "Big Four". The event is traditionally characterized by having Survivor Series matches, which are tag team elimination matches that typically pits teams of four or five wrestlers against each other.

The 20th Survivor Series was scheduled to be held on November 26, 2006, at the Wachovia Center in Philadelphia, Pennsylvania. It featured wrestlers from the Raw, SmackDown!, and ECW brand divisions. This was the first Survivor Series to include ECW, a relaunch of the former Extreme Championship Wrestling (ECW) promotion that became a WWE brand earlier that year in May, subsequently also being the first to feature the ECW World Championship (though the championship was not defended as the champion was involved in a Survivor Series match).

=== Storylines ===
The event consisted of seven professional wrestling matches with outcomes predetermined by WWE script writers. The wrestlers portrayed their characters in planned storylines that took place before, during, and after the event. All wrestlers were from either one of WWE's brands – Raw, SmackDown!, and ECW – while the storylines played out on their weekly television shows, Raw, SmackDown!, and ECW.

The main feud on Raw heading into Survivor Series was between John Cena and Umaga. Umaga was Cena's latest challenge after Cena finished off the feud between King Booker and The Big Show at Cyber Sunday. On the November 13 episode of Raw, Cena and Umaga finally fought in a singles match, but it was interrupted by the ECW World Champion The Big Show forcing it to a no-contest.

The primary feud on SmackDown! was between World Heavyweight Champion King Booker and Batista. Batista relinquished the title in Philadelphia at the Wachovia Center on the January 13 episode of SmackDown!, the same exact location of Survivor Series due to a triceps injury. King Booker had already faced Batista and retained the World Heavyweight Championship at two pay-per-views (SummerSlam and No Mercy - the latter in a fatal four-way) since his return on the July 7 episode of SmackDown!. This time, Theodore Long announced that the match at Survivor Series would be Batista's last chance to win the World Heavyweight Championship.

Another feud was between The Undertaker and Mr. Kennedy. Kennedy beat The Undertaker at No Mercy by disqualification. On the November 10 episode of SmackDown!, Kennedy challenged The Undertaker once more bragging that he beat four former world champions. The match was made into a First blood match.

The ECW brand was building up their "Extreme Elimination Chamber" match at December to Dismember. The contestants that were named to face the ECW World Champion The Big Show were: Rob Van Dam, Sabu, CM Punk, and Test. The final contestant was revealed on the November 21 edition of ECW. It was Bobby Lashley, and he attacked Big Show during the in-ring segment.

== Event ==
Other on-screen personnel
Role:	Name:
English commentators	Jim Ross (Raw)
English commentators	Jerry Lawler (Raw)
English commentators	Michael Cole (SmackDown!)
English commentators	John "Bradshaw" Layfield (SmackDown!)
Spanish commentators	Carlos Cabrera
Spanish commentators	Hugo Savinovich
Interviewer	Todd Grisham
Interviewer	Kristal Marshall
Ring announcer	Lilian Garcia (Raw)
Ring announcer	Tony Chimel (SmackDown!)
Referees	Mike Chioda (Raw)
Referees	Jack Doan (Raw)
Referees	Chad Patton (Raw)
Referees	Jim Korderas (SmackDown!)
Referees	Charles Robinson (SmackDown!)
Referees	Nick Patrick (SmackDown!)
Referees	Mickie Henson (ECW)
General Managers	Jonathan Coachman (Raw Executive Assistant)
General Managers	Theodore Long (SmackDown!)
General Managers	Paul Heyman (ECW Representative)

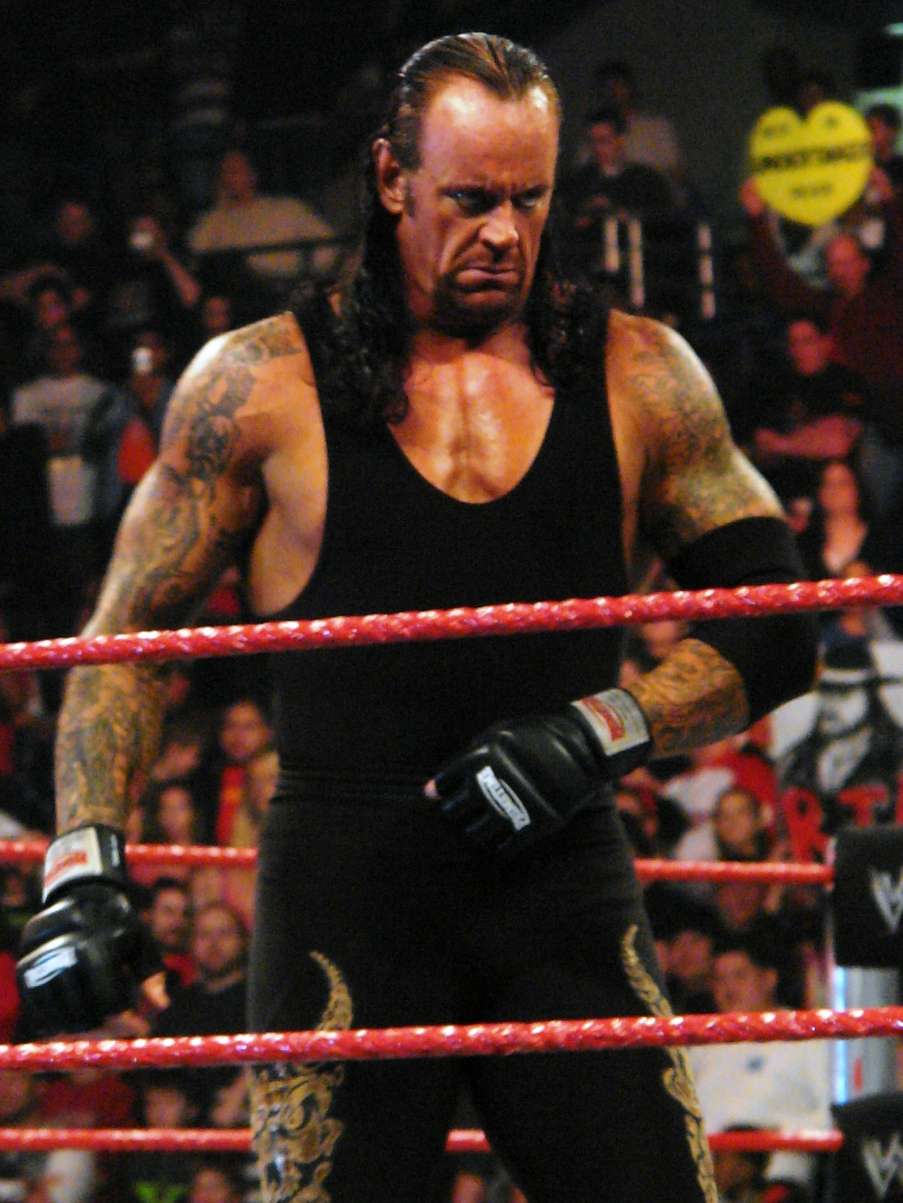
The Undertaker faced Mr. Kennedy in a First blood match

Prior to the event, a non-televised match between Carlito and Charlie Haas took place, which Carlito won after a Backstabber.

The first match was a four-on-four Survivor Series match between Team Spirit Squad (Kenny, Johnny, Nicky, and Mikey), with Mitch managing the team, and Team WWE Legends (Ric Flair, Sgt. Slaughter, Dusty Rhodes, and Ron Simmons), with Arn Anderson managing the team. Simmons was eliminated after being counted out, leading to the referee ejecting Anderson and Mitch. Nicky eliminated Slaughter after a Spinning Heel Kick by Johnny. Rhodes eliminated Nicky after a Bionic Elbow. Kenny eliminated Rhodes with a roll-up while holding Rhodes' jeans. Flair eliminated Mikey, using the ropes for leverage while pinning Mikey. Flair also eliminated Kenny with an inside cradle. Flair also eliminated Johnny after submitting to the Figure Four Leglock, leaving Flair as the sole survivor. After the match, The Spirit Squad attacked Flair.

In the second match, Chris Benoit faced Chavo Guerrero for the United States Championship. During the match, Chavo executed a Frog Splash on Benoit for a near-fall. Benoit accidentally knocked Vickie Guerrero off the apron when Chavo countered Benoit's attempt to apply the Sharpshooter. Benoit forced Chavo to submit to the Crippler Crossface to retain the title.

Next, Lita defended the Women's Championship against Mickie James in Lita's "last" match, during which she had to endure "she's a crack whore" chants from the crowd. James performed the Tornado DDT to win back the title. After the match, Cryme Tyme came out and sold Lita's personal belongings to the audience which they stole in an earlier backstage segment, much to her shock and horror.

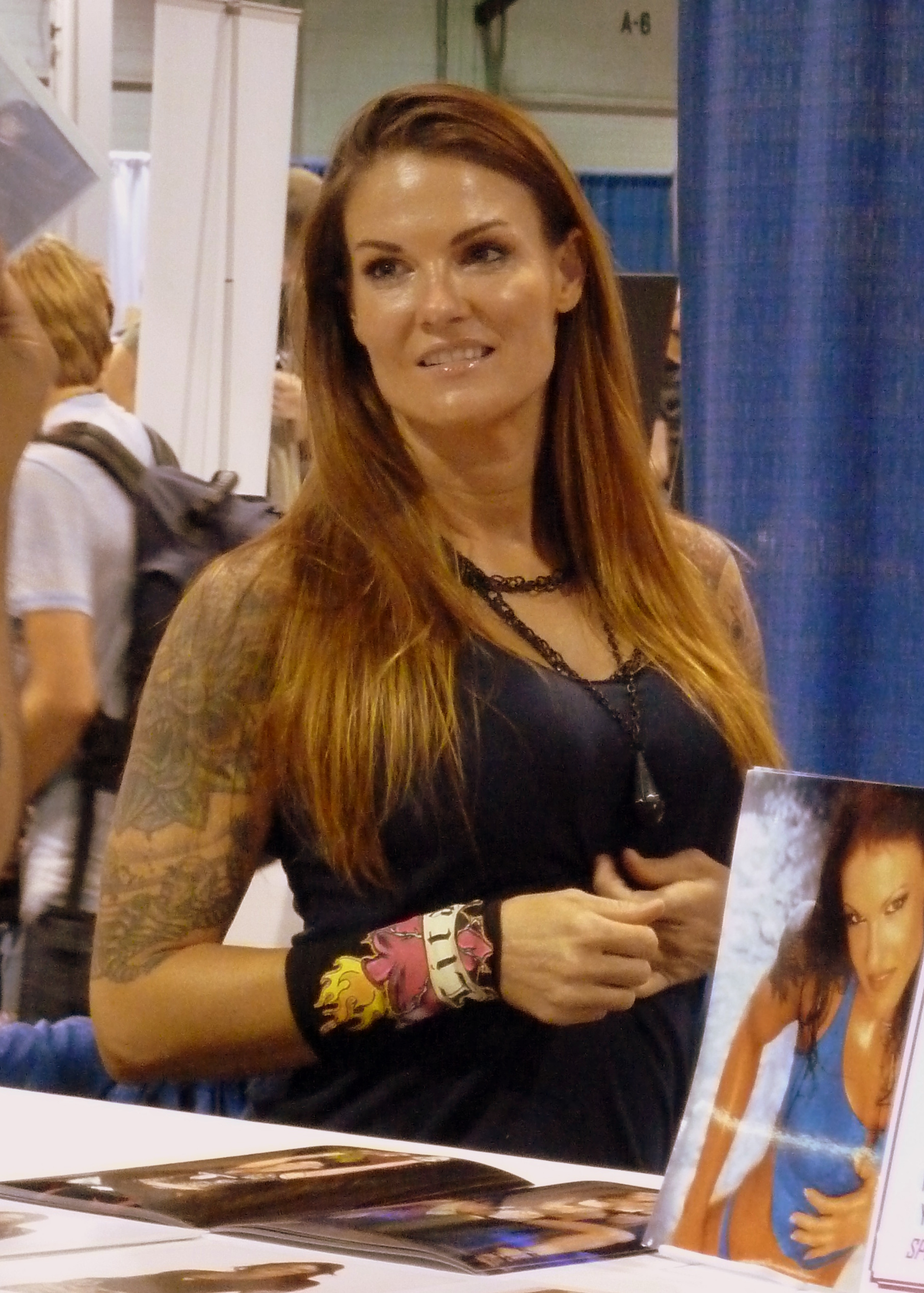
Lita as the WWE Women's Champion wrestled her "last" match at this event

The next match was a traditional Survivor Series match between Team DX (Triple H, Shawn Michaels, Jeff Hardy, Matt Hardy, and CM Punk) versus Team Rated-RKO (Edge, Randy Orton, Johnny Nitro, Gregory Helms, and Mike Knox). Knox was eliminated by Michaels after Sweet Chin Music while Knox was distracted by his then-girlfriend, Kelly Kelly. After the elimination, Michaels asked his team who he eliminated. Nitro was eliminated by Punk after submitting to the Anaconda Vice. Helms was then eliminated by Matt after a Twist of Fate by Matt and a Swanton Bomb from Jeff Hardy. Edge was eliminated by Michaels after Sweet Chin Music. Orton was eliminated by Triple H after Sweet Chin Music by Michaels and a Pedigree, meaning Team DX won the match with no members eliminated.

The fifth match was a First blood match between Mr. Kennedy and The Undertaker. During the match, Kennedy started to cough blood but Montel Vontavious Porter (MVP) provided Kennedy with a towel and cleaned the blood. Referee Charles Robinson did not notice that Kennedy was bleeding so the match continued. The match ended when MVP hit The Undertaker with a chair, causing him to bleed. After the match, The Undertaker went on an onslaught, hitting Mr. Kennedy with a hard chair shot making him bleed profusely, performed a Tombstone piledriver, then hitting Kennedy multiple times with his bare fist.

The next match was the traditional Survivor Series match between Team Cena (John Cena, Rob Van Dam, Sabu, Kane, and Bobby Lashley) and Team Big Show (Big Show, Test, Umaga, Finlay, and MVP). Umaga was eliminated after being disqualified for hitting Van Dam with a television monitor. Van Dam eliminated MVP after a chokeslam by Kane and a Five Star Frog Splash. Test eliminated Van Dam after a Running Big Boot. Sabu eliminated Test after a Springboard Tornado DDT. Big Show eliminated Sabu with a chokeslam. Kane was eliminated when Finlay hit Kane with a shillelagh and Big Show performed a Chokeslam on Kane. Lashley speared Finlay to eliminate him. Cena eliminated Big Show after a Spear by Lashley and an FU, leaving Cena and Lashley as the sole survivors.

The main event was a Last Chance match between King Booker and Batista for the World Heavyweight Championship. Theodore Long announced before the match, if King Booker had been disqualified or counted out, he would lose the championship to Batista. Batista executed a Spinebuster on King Booker for a near-fall. King Booker executed a Book End on Batista for a near-fall. Batista executed a Batista Bomb on King Booker but King Booker touched the bottom rope, voiding the pinfall. Batista almost executed a Batista Bomb on King Booker's wife, Queen Sharmell, but threw her out of the ring instead. Whilst the referee was tending to Queen Sharmell, King Booker attempted to hit Batista with the title belt but Batista countered and hit King Booker with the belt. Batista pinned King Booker to win the title in the same city where he had to surrender the title back in January earlier in the year.

== Reception ==
411mania wrestling gave it a 4.5 out of 10 calling it "boring".

== Aftermath ==
The following night on Raw, Triple H, Shawn Michaels, and Ric Flair defeated all five members of the Spirit Squad. They were sick and tired of the Spirit Squad, so in a backstage segment, DX locked the Spirit Squad in a travel case and sent them to Ohio Valley Wrestling (OVW) in Louisville, Kentucky via delivery van. That was the end of the Spirit Squad faction. As for DX's teammates at Survivor Series, The Hardys were challenged by the newly reunited team of MNM (Johnny Nitro and Joey Mercury). Eventually, they had a tag team match at December to Dismember.

Victoria earned a shot at the Women's Championship by defeating Melina, Torrie Wilson, Maria, and Candice Michelle in a battle royal. She eventually lost to the Women's Champion Mickie James at New Year's Revolution.

WWE Champion John Cena was challenged by the undefeated Umaga the next night on Raw. Cena accepted the challenge and they had the championship match at the next Raw pay-per-view, New Year's Revolution. Cena ended Umaga's winning streak to retain the championship.

On the following episode of SmackDown!, General Manager Theodore Long announced Kane versus Montel Vontavious Porter in an Inferno match and The Undertaker versus Mr. Kennedy in a Last Ride match at Armageddon. This led to the reunification of The Brothers of Destruction versus Kennedy and MVP on the December 15 episode of SmackDown!.

The ECW main feud was between Big Show and Bobby Lashley who signed a contract to be in the Extreme Elimination Chamber match on the November 14 of ECW. At December to Dismember, Lashley became the new ECW World Champion by winning the Extreme Elimination Chamber match.

After defeating King Booker at Survivor Series, Batista would go on to hold the World Heavyweight Championship for four months, defending it against Mr. Kennedy at the 2007 Royal Rumble. Batista would then finally lose the championship to The Undertaker, the winner of the 2007 Royal Rumble, at WrestleMania 23.

== Results ==
No.	Results	Stipulations	Times
1^{D}	Carlito defeated Charlie Haas by pinfall	Singles match	5:00
2	Team WWE Legends (Dusty Rhodes, Ric Flair, Ron Simmons and Sgt. Slaughter) (with Arn Anderson) defeated The Spirit Squad (Johnny, Kenny, Mikey and Nicky) (with Mitch)	4-on-4 Survivor Series match^{1}	10:31
3	Chris Benoit (c) defeated Chavo Guerrero (with Vickie Guerrero) by submission	Singles match for the WWE United States Championship	8:19
4	Mickie James defeated Lita (c) by pinfall	Singles match for the WWE Women's Championship; This was Lita's retirement match.	8:18
5	Team D-X (Shawn Michaels, Triple H, CM Punk, Jeff Hardy and Matt Hardy) defeated Team Rated-RKO (Edge, Randy Orton, Gregory Helms, Johnny Nitro and Mike Knox) (with Kelly Kelly and Melina)	5-on-5 Survivor Series match^{2}	11:30
6	Mr. Kennedy defeated The Undertaker	First Blood match	9:15
7	Team Cena (John Cena, Bobby Lashley, Kane, Rob Van Dam, and Sabu) defeated Team Big Show (Big Show, Finlay, MVP, Test, and Umaga) (with Armando Alejandro Estrada)	5-on-5 Survivor Series match^{3}	12:35
8	Batista defeated King Booker (c) (with Queen Sharmell) by pinfall	Last Chance match for the World Heavyweight Championship; Had King Booker been counted out or disqualified, he would have lost the title.	13:58
(c) / – the champion(s) heading into the match; D / – this was a dark match

=== Survivor Series matches ===
^1

Eliminated	Wrestler	Eliminated by	Method	Time
1	Ron Simmons	N/A	Countout	1:54
2	Sgt. Slaughter	Nicky	Roundhouse Kick	6:27
3	Nicky	Dusty Rhodes	Elbow Drop	6:54
4	Dusty Rhodes	Kenny	Roll-up	8:25
5	Mikey	Ric Flair	Roll-up	9:13
6	Kenny	Ric Flair	Inside Cradle	9:49
7	Johnny	Ric Flair	Figure 4 Lecklock	10:31
Sole Survivor:	Ric Flair (Team WWE Legends)			10:31

^2

Eliminated	Wrestler	Eliminated by	Team	Method	Time
1	Mike Knox	Shawn Michaels	Team Rated-RKO	Sweet Chin Music	0:40
2	Johnny Nitro	CM Punk	Team Rated-RKO	Anaconda Vise	4:54
3	Gregory Helms	Matt Hardy	Team Rated-RKO	Swanton Bomb	9:23
4	Edge	Shawn Michaels	Team Rated-RKO	Sweet Chin Music	10:35
5	Randy Orton	Triple H	Team Rated-RKO	Pedigree	11:30
Survivor(s):	CM Punk, Jeff Hardy, Matt Hardy, Shawn Michaels, and Triple H (Team DX) (clean sweep)				11:30

^3

Eliminated	Wrestler	Eliminated by	Method	Time
1	Umaga	N/A	Disqualification	0:58
2	MVP	Rob Van Dam	Five Star Frog Splash	5:31
3	Rob Van Dam	Test	Big Boot	5:47
4	Test	Sabu	Backflip DDT	6:19
5	Sabu	Big Show	Chokeslam	6:35
6	Kane	Big Show	Chokeslam	7:26
7	Finlay	Bobby Lashley	Spear	10:28
8	Big Show	John Cena	Attitude Adjustment	12:35
Survivor(s):	John Cena and Bobby Lashley (Team Cena)			12:35
