= D-Generation X =

Professional wrestling stable

- D-Generation X logo in the 1990s

Stable
- Name(s): D-Generation X DX; DX Army
- Former members: Shawn Michaels (Co-Leader); Triple H (Co-Leader); Chyna; Rick Rude; Mike Tyson; X-Pac; Road Dogg; Billy Gunn; Tori; Stephanie McMahon; Hornswoggle
- Debut: August 11, 1997
- Years active: 1997–2000; 2006–2010 (sporadic); 2010–present (non-wrestling reunions); 2018

D-Generation X (DX) was an American professional wrestling stable, and later a tag team. DX consisted of various members, mostly Generation X wrestlers. The most notable members were Shawn Michaels, Triple H, Chyna, X-Pac, and the New Age Outlaws, a tag team consisting of Road Dogg and Billy Gunn.

The group originated in the World Wrestling Federation (WWF, now known as WWE) at the dawn of the "Attitude Era" in 1997 as a foil to another prominent faction, The Hart Foundation, and became one of the main driving forces behind the WWF competing with World Championship Wrestling (WCW) in the Monday Night War. In addition to two other founding members, Chyna and Rick Rude, the group later expanded with new additions X-Pac, The New Age Outlaws, and Tori until the group officially disbanded in August 2000. After a teased reunion in 2002, DX reformed in June 2006 as the duo of Triple H and Shawn Michaels for the remainder of the year and again in August 2009 until March 2010, shortly before Michaels' retirement. This incarnation was voted the greatest WWE Tag Team Champions of all time in a 2013 WWE viewer poll. Today, most of its members are active in the day-to-day operations of the WWE, such as Paul Levesque, who serves as the chief content officer and head of creative, while Michaels serves as Senior Vice President of Talent Development Creative overseeing the NXT brand and Brian James formerly held the role of Senior Vice President of Live Events.

On October 8, 2018, it was announced that DX would face The Brothers of Destruction (The Undertaker and Kane) at the Crown Jewel pay-per view. At Crown Jewel, Triple H and Michaels were victorious against The Undertaker and Kane. On February 18, 2019, it was announced that the group would be inducted into the WWE Hall of Fame later that year, with Triple H, Michaels, Chyna, The New Age Outlaws, and X-Pac as the inducted members.

== Concept ==
The group's gimmick was best known as a gang of rebels who broke the rules, acted and spoke as they pleased, and wrestled whomever they wanted no matter how provocative and insulting. Noted for their crude, profane humor and sophomoric pranks, the stable has been dubbed multiple times as the "most controversial group in WWF/E history". Michaels' autobiography suggests that it was WWF head writer Vince Russo who first conceived the moniker for the faction, while Bret Hart claims it originated from New York Post columnist Phil Mushnick, a frequent critic of the WWF. Triple H also claims that Shane McMahon coined the name of D-Generation X when responding to Bret Hart's characterization of younger wrestlers as degenerates.

DX was one of the three main contributing factors, along with Stone Cold Steve Austin and The Rock, to the onset of the WWF's Attitude Era. WWF/E Chairman Vince McMahon has repeatedly denied that DX was inspired or heavily influenced by World Championship Wrestling's (WCW) New World Order (nWo), though the core members of both on-screen factions included members of The Kliq; (Sean Waltman even served as a member of both groups; as did Michaels, briefly, during the nWo's short-lived revival in the WWF/E in 2002). On October 6, 1997, in one of the earliest DX promos, Michaels alluded to this off-screen connection. After Bret Hart claimed to have destroyed the Kliq and to have "run Scott Hall and Kevin Nash outta town" (referring to Hall and Nash leaving the WWF and signing with WCW), Michaels declared, "The Kliq owns this professional wrestling business", and said that the group had simply undergone "expansion" rather than "destruction".

== History ==
=== Formation and early rivalries (1997–1998) ===
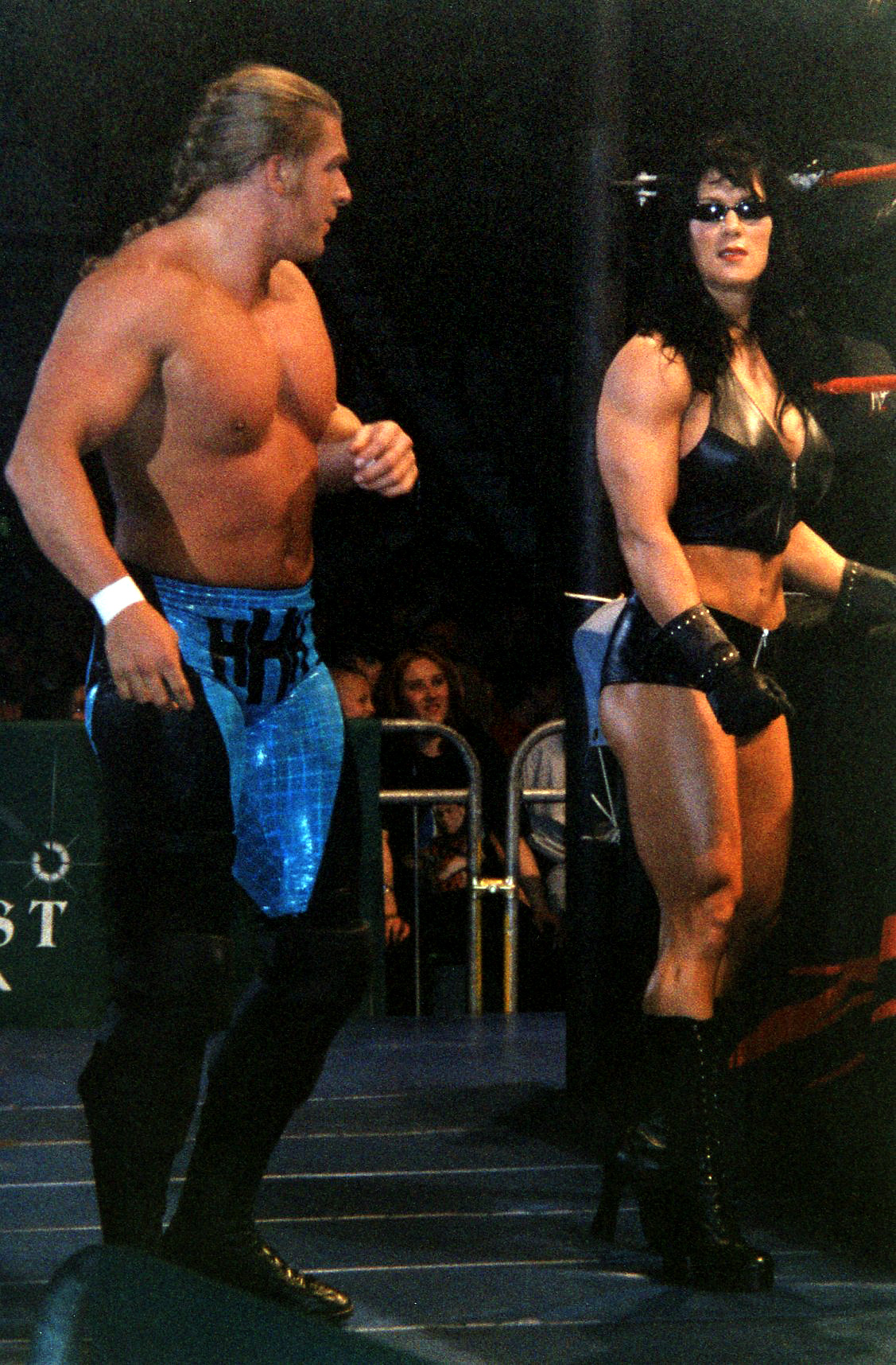
Chyna (right), acted as an enforcer for Triple H (left) and Michaels in 1997, then remained allied with the larger incarnation of the stable until 1999

According to Triple H, WWF management wanted to keep The Kliq apart on-screen, so they were hesitant to pair him and Michaels together at first. Despite this, the group began to form during the August 11, 1997 main event of Raw Is War. During Michaels' match with Mankind, Triple H (then wrestling under the ring name of Hunter Hearst Helmsley) and Chyna both interfered, as Helmsley had been recently feuding with Mankind; the end of the match also saw Rick Rude return to the WWF revealing himself as Michaels' "insurance policy", helping Michaels win the match by attacking Mankind with a chair. The following week on Raw, Michaels and Helmsley teamed up to take on Mankind and The Undertaker in the main event, only to lose the match by disqualification after Michaels used a chair on Undertaker. Michaels would eventually face the Undertaker at Ground Zero: In Your House on September 7 with Helmsley, Chyna and Rude all interfering on Michaels' behalf to force the match to end in a no contest. During this time, the group (Michaels and Helmsley in particular) were regularly shown on television practicing sophomoric/crude humor and rebelling against authority figures in the company, primarily Vince McMahon (then primarily presented as an on-screen commentator) and then-Commissioner Sgt. Slaughter, the latter of which DX made a recurring habit of humiliating by giving him the nickname "Sgt. Slobber".

D-Generation X's first major feud was against the Hart Foundation, which was led by Michaels' nemesis Bret Hart. At WWF One Night Only, the rest of DX helped Michaels defeat Foundation member British Bulldog for the WWF European Championship, officially making Michaels the WWF's first Grand Slam Champion. On-screen, the name was taken from comments by Hart, who on several occasions, particularly including the October 6, 1997 episode of Raw Is War, had labeled Michaels "nothing more than a degenerate". The following week, on October 13, 1997, Michaels made "D-Generation X" the group's official name, mockingly citing Hart's insults as his inspiration and how Generation X (with both members being part of Generation X) is always stereotyped as apathetic and cynical.

Although DX and the members of The Hart Foundation continued to battle on-screen in one fashion or another through the end of 1997, the Bret Hart-Shawn Michaels feud ended abruptly at Survivor Series when Michaels won his third WWF Championship via the Montreal Screwjob, whereby Hart was lied to about the match's pre-determined outcome after Hart had signed with World Championship Wrestling (WCW) and refused to drop the WWF Championship to Michaels in Canada and instead agreed to drop the title one month later in Springfield, Massachusetts. Rick Rude was also legitimately upset over the events of the screwjob, and subsequently left the WWF to return to WCW. On the November 24 episode of Raw Is War, DX invited Jim "The Anvil" Neidhart to join the group, which he accepted prior to a match later that night between Vader and Michaels. Michaels, Chyna and Helmsley assaulted Neidhart at the end of the show after Michaels defeated Vader, showing that Neidhart's invitation to the group was nothing more than a ruse. The following week on the December 1 episode of Raw Is War, Helmsley defeated Neidhart. After the match, DX assaulted Neidhart once again, before Michaels spray-painted "WCW" on Neidhart's back, signifying him following Bret Hart and The British Bulldog to WCW. Sgt. Slaughter and Ken Shamrock saved Neidhart, before Slaughter and Shamrock attacked DX at the end of the show.

D-Generation X was used as the title for a WWF D-Generation X: In Your House pay-per-view telecast on December 7, 1997. By this point, with Michaels holding both the WWF and WWF European Championships, and DX's victory in the feud with the Hart Foundation, their status as the lead stable in the company was solidified. Michaels headlined the event and was disqualified in a WWF Championship title defense against Ken Shamrock after interference from Helmsley and Chyna. After the match, Owen Hart interfered, having not been seen on WWF television since Survivor Series, starting a feud between Owen and DX. Earlier in the night, Helmsley (now primarily wrestling under the ring name of Triple H) defeated Sgt. Slaughter with the help of Chyna in a Boot Camp match. On the December 22 episode of Raw is War, however, Michaels and Triple H were forced by Slaughter to wrestle each other for the European Championship. In a mock match, Michaels laid down in the middle of the ring while Triple H constantly ran the ropes. Triple H would then pin Michaels and win the European Championship.

Triple H lost the European Championship to Owen Hart in January 1998 only to regain it two months later. Going into WrestleMania XIV that March, Shawn Michaels was the reigning WWF Champion and Triple H was the reigning WWF European Champion. Heavyweight boxer Mike Tyson was also involved as the "special enforcer" in the main event of the night featuring Michaels against Stone Cold Steve Austin. In the weeks leading up to the event, Tyson was revealed to have joined D-Generation X, and looked as if he was going to help Michaels retain the championship. However, at the end of the match, Tyson turned on DX and cost Michaels the match and the WWF Championship, allowing Austin to win the title.

=== Michaels' departure and "DX Army" (1998–1999) ===
The night after WrestleMania, Triple H officially ejected Michaels from DX for "dropping the ball" over the Tyson incident and subsequently losing the WWF Championship. In reality, Michaels had suffered a severe back injury during his Casket Match with The Undertaker at the Royal Rumble, and started what would become a four-year hiatus from the WWE to recuperate. Triple H would assume full leadership of DX and recruited X-Pac, who had been recently fired from WCW, and the current WWF Tag Team Champions The New Age Outlaws ("Bad Ass" Billy Gunn and "The Road Dogg" Jesse James) into the stable. Triple H would dub this iteration as his new "DX Army". While the intent was for the stable to remain heels, they quickly became popular with audiences and were eventually pushed as faces. During this time, they feuded with The Rock and his group The Nation and then later, Vince McMahon's Corporation. The group remained united throughout 1998 and into early 1999.

On episodes of Raw Is War in April and May DX "went to war" with WCW, with whom the WWF were in direct competition at the time, through a series of legitimate visits to WCW headquarters and live events. On April 27, 1998, Raw Is War and Nitro both took place in the Hampton Roads area of Virginia, a mere 19 miles apart. DX traveled from the WWF show in Hampton Coliseum in Hampton to The Scope in Norfolk and shouted insults against WCW through a bullhorn, as well as accusing WCW of giving out free tickets to fill up arenas for television while sporting black armbands with the acronym "POWCW" (Prisoner of WCW), which referenced fellow Kliq members Scott Hall and Kevin Nash. DX then tried to enter the arena via a loading dock in their army jeep before being stopped by someone closing the door. They also attempted to forcibly secure meetings with Nitro's executive producer Eric Bischoff and WCW owner Ted Turner at WCW headquarters in Atlanta, Georgia. Another segment used computer graphics to make it appear as if Triple H had flown over the Roberts Municipal Stadium in Evansville, Indiana where WCW Nitro was taking place and wrote "WCW Sucks" and "DX Says Suck It" in the sky.

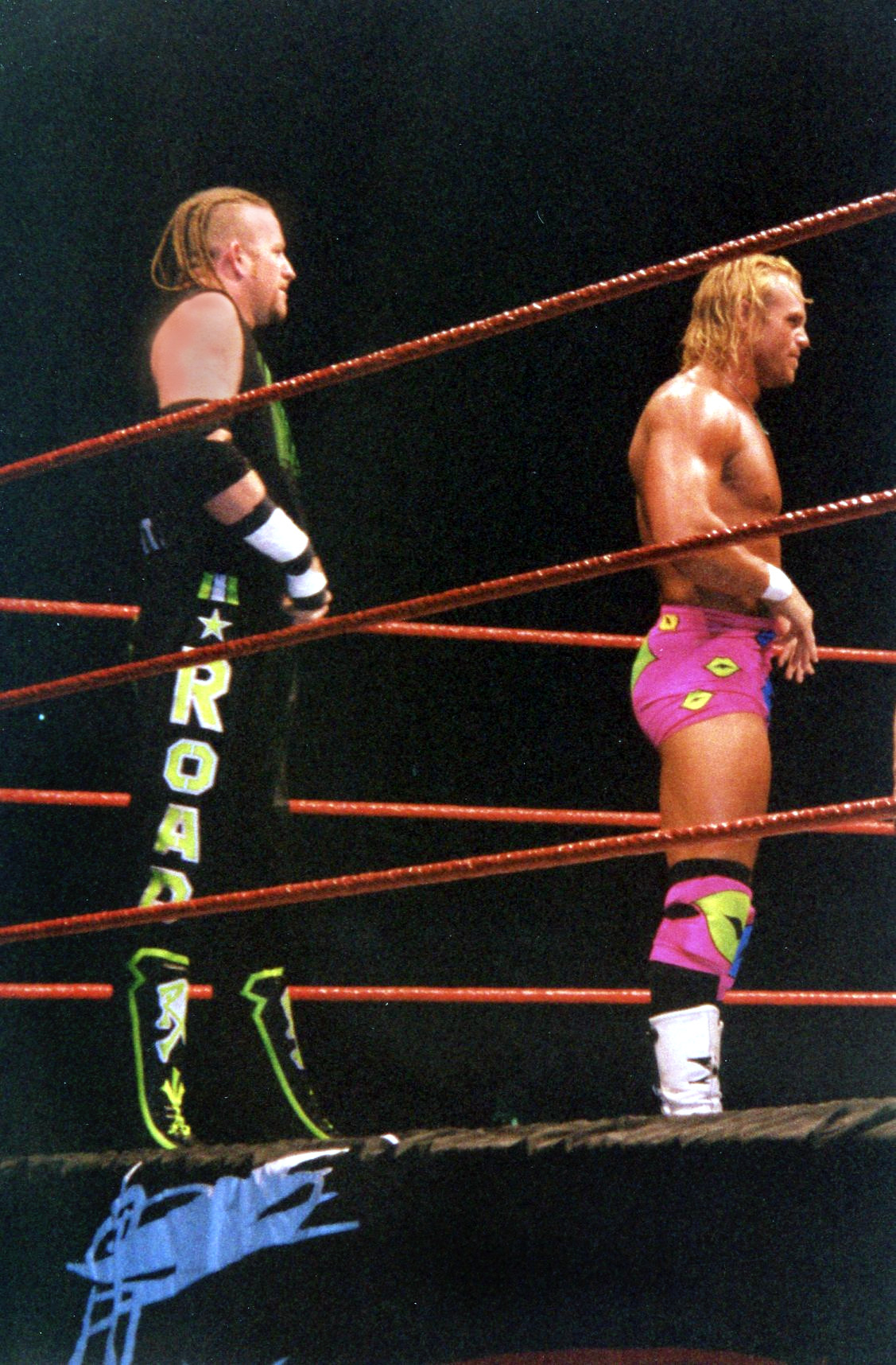
DX expanded after Michaels' departure to include The New Age Outlaws tag team, who had often affiliated with the stable prior to joining

The group also feuded with the new Corporate Commissioner, former DX leader Shawn Michaels, who had turned heel and betrayed the group after costing X-Pac a WWF Championship match against The Rock. The faction would continue to feud with Michaels and The Corporation throughout late 1998, with Michaels reversing Billy Gunn's Intercontinental Championship victory against Ken Shamrock, costing The Outlaws the Tag Team Titles and even managing to seemingly lure the New Age Outlaws to The Corporation on the December 7 episode of Raw Is War. However, the Outlaws quickly revealed this to have been a ruse, turning on The Corporation that same night. When The Corporation turned on Michaels in January 1999, he was taken in by DX once more. This too was short lived, as later that night DX were instrumental in Michaels being ambushed by The Corporation, with X-Pac commenting "What goes around, comes around".

Some of the group's most memorable promos were their parodies of their rivals. On July 6, 1998, DX carried out the first of these segments, where they mocked and parodied The Nation, with Triple H mocking The Rock as "The Crock"; Road Dogg playing the part of D'Lo Brown as "B'Lo"; Billy Gunn as The Godfather; X-Pac as a parody of Mark Henry, going by "Mizark"; and comedian Jason Sensation as Owen Hart. On December 14, 1998, they would turn their attention to The Corporation with Triple H again appearing as "The Crock"; Road Dogg playing Mr. McMahon (with two midgets representing Gerald Brisco and Pat Patterson kissing his behind throughout); Billy Gunn, playing Shane McMahon wearing an adult diaper; X-Pac playing Ken Shamrock; Chyna as The Big Boss Man; and Sensation returning to play Michaels. These parodies would also be resurrected during the fourth incarnation. X-Pac's parody of Mark Henry has been seen as highly controversial due to him being in blackface; X-Pac would admit on his podcast in 2018 that it was one of his biggest career regrets, despite having Henry's personal blessing to do the segment.

Throughout 1999, the members would gradually turn on one another, leading to the group officially disbanding for the first time. Initially, Chyna turned on Triple H and X-Pac and joined the Corporation on January 25. At WrestleMania XV, Chyna turned on then fellow Corporation member Kane, helping Triple H to defeat him, and seemingly rejoining DX. Later that night, however, Triple H and Chyna interfered in X-Pac's European Championship match with Shane McMahon. Initially, it appeared that they were there to help X-Pac, but Triple H quickly turned on him, delivering a Pedigree to his stablemate, costing him the match. Chyna and Triple H would then join The Corporation, with Kane subsequently being ousted. As a result, X-Pac began to share a bond with Kane, which resulted in Kane becoming a close ally of the faction, and the duo would hold the WWF Tag Team Championship on two occasions.

Though the group maintained a united front against The Corporation, Billy Gunn would become frustrated at Kane's presence, as well as The New Age Outlaws' inability to win the Tag Team Championships from X-Pac and Kane. Following one such defeat on the April 29 episode of SmackDown!, Gunn became angry at X-Pac. The following week on Sunday Night Heat, he apologized to X-Pac, but attacked him when X-Pac's back was turned, citing his frustration at being "held back" and departing from D-Generation X, therefore reducing the remaining members to just Road Dogg and X-Pac. Over the following weeks, Gunn would continue to attack X-Pac and Road Dogg, often being chased away by Kane. In July, Triple H and Chyna told Billy Gunn that Road Dogg and X-Pac were making a lot more money from DX's royalties than the other three (due to them still using the name as a tag team). This would lead to a tag match at Fully Loaded, in which the winners would get the rights to use the DX name, which Road Dogg and X-Pac won. Though not officially a member, upon winning the Tag Team titles from The Acolytes on August 9, Kane, under encouragement from partner X-Pac, uttered his first on-screen words without help from a voice box, saying "suck it".

=== Reformation and McMahon-Helmsley Era (1999–2000) ===
On October 25, the group reformed as villains when Triple H and X-Pac helped the New Age Outlaws – who had reunited the previous month – defeat Stone Cold Steve Austin and The Rock. Later that week on SmackDown!, X-Pac suggested that DX would get "bigger", hinting that Kane would finally become an official member. However, later that night, he turned on Kane following a match with The Dudley Boyz, stating there would be no additional members and starting a feud between the two. That same night, DX were "hunted" by Austin, with Stone Cold catching Road Dogg in a bear trap, Billy Gunn in a snare trap, having a portion of the backstage ceiling fall on X-Pac and finally catching the whole group in a net. Despite this, The Outlaws won their fifth Tag Team Championship soon afterward, defeating Mankind and Al Snow on the November 8 edition of Raw. Not participating in the reunited DX were Chyna who was in a feud with Chris Jericho for the Intercontinental Championship; Shawn Michaels, who was in the middle of a four-year hiatus from wrestling; and Rick Rude, who had died in April 1999.

Triple H, meanwhile, would escalate an ongoing feud with Vince McMahon on the November 29 episode of Raw, when he interrupted the wedding of Stephanie McMahon and Test to reveal that he had already married Stephanie at a Las Vegas drive-through wedding chapel while she was supposedly drugged unconscious. Triple H would then defeat Vince in a street fight at Armageddon after Stephanie turned on her father and embraced her then-storyline husband. The two revealed the next night on Raw that the ceremony, as well as Stephanie being under the influence, was a ruse as part of a revenge plot for Vince orchestrating Stephanie's abduction by the Ministry earlier in the year. This officially marked the beginning of the McMahon-Helmsley Era, with Stephanie becoming an official member of DX through her ties to Triple H.

When Kane's storyline girlfriend Tori began to get involved in the feud between Kane and X-Pac, Triple H and Stephanie punished her by scheduling Tori in a match with X-Pac on the December 16 episode of SmackDown!, after which they would grant Kane a WWF Championship match against The Big Show on the December 20 episode of Raw wherei if Kane lost, Tori would have to spend Christmas with X-Pac. The New Age Outlaws distracted Kane, costing him the match. When Tori returned, she insisted that X-Pac had been a perfect gentleman.

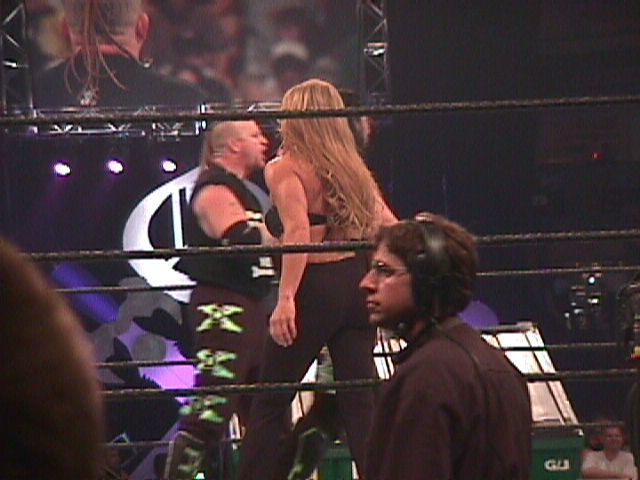
Road Dogg with X-Pac's on-screen girlfriend Tori

By January 2000, Triple H had dubbed himself "The Game", after stating he was above the top of the wrestling world (as in not merely the "best in the game", but in fact "the game" itself) and was nicknamed "The Cerebral Assassin" by Jim Ross. On the January 3 episode of Raw Is War, Triple H defeated Big Show to win his third WWF Championship. Meanwhile, storylines implied that X-Pac had truly done something harmful to Tori when she started appearing as neurotic and paranoid, with many WWF superstars using Tori's mental state to provoke Kane into attacking their enemies over the ensuing month. X-Pac also gave Tori an apparently forced kiss during his match with Kane on the January 24 episode of Raw. This storyline culminated on the January 27 episode of SmackDown!, when DX jumped Kane during another match against Big Show, leading to a promo in which X-Pac recounted his Christmas rendezvous with Tori; Tori then passionately kissed X-Pac, turning on Kane and joining DX in the process. Throughout this period, DX would feud with the likes of The Rock, Mankind/Cactus Jack, Chris Jericho, Kane and the other McMahons, primarily securing and protecting Triple H's WWF Championship as well as The Outlaws' WWF Tag Team Championship. They would also arrive at arenas in a tour bus called "The DX Express".

During a match at No Way Out where The Outlaws lost the Tag Team Championship to The Dudley Boyz, Gunn suffered a torn rotator cuff which would place him out of action for several months. On-screen, to explain his impending absence to recover from his injury, Gunn's storyline involved him getting thrown out of DX because "he lost his cool" when Triple H had X-Pac take his place in the rematch. X-Pac teamed with Road Dogg once again, but the two never reached the heights the New Age Outlaws had. On March 30, X-Pac and Tori assisted Stephanie McMahon in winning the Women's Championship from Jacqueline. At WrestleMania 2000, Triple H defended his title in a fatal four-way elimination match against The Rock, Mick Foley, and Big Show, with a separate McMahon appearing in every superstar's corner. Vince McMahon turned on The Rock and aided Triple H in retaining his title. DX would then unite with Vince and Shane's Corporation stable, and the resulting group was officially dubbed The McMahon-Helmsley Regime. On April 27, Stone Cold Steve Austin used a crane to drop a steel beam on the DX Express tour bus, causing the bus to explode in the parking lot.

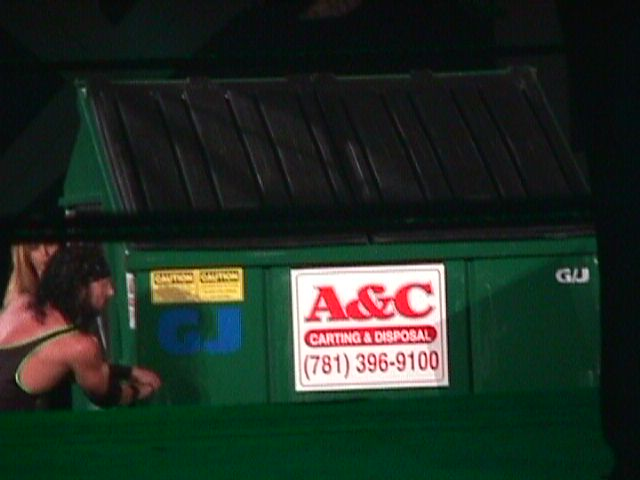
X-Pac in a Dumpster match, fought alongside Road Dogg and Tori against frequent rivals the Dudley Boyz

The Rock defeated Triple H for the WWF Championship at Backlash in a match which featured Stone Cold Steve Austin's brief return to the WWF. Though Triple H regained the title the following month at Judgment Day, the group gradually broke apart. Road Dogg and X-Pac became frustrated by their lack of success as a tag team and turned on each other, culminating in a match at SummerSlam, which X-Pac won. By late 2000, Triple H had become a solo star, and even briefly turned face during a love triangle storyline involving Stephanie and Kurt Angle. Billy Gunn, meanwhile, had returned to action and struck a partnership with Chyna following the dissolution of her storyline relationship with Eddie Guerrero.

On the November 6, 2000 episode of Raw Is War, Chyna, Road Dogg, Billy Gunn, and Triple H reunited to take on The Radicalz (Chris Benoit, Eddie Guerrero, Dean Malenko, and Perry Saturn) in an eight-person tag team match, which they won. The match included the group doing their old DX entrance, as well as telling the crowd to "suck it!" This reunion would be short-lived however, as on that very same episode, Triple H turned heel when he attacked Stone Cold Steve Austin and revealed himself as the mastermind behind Austin's hit-and-run assault at the Survivor Series the year before. Chyna and Gunn, along with Road Dogg and his new tag team partner K-Kwik, continued to feud with The Radicalz that month, leading to a match at Survivor Series, which The Radicalz would win.

=== Shawn Michaels' return and feud with Triple H (2002–2004) ===
After November 2000, DX remained unseen and largely unmentioned until Shawn Michaels returned to WWE in the summer of 2002. Michaels persuaded then-Raw General Manager Eric Bischoff to sign Triple H to a Raw contract as part of the "Brand Extension" at Vengeance. The following night on the July 22 episode of Raw (Shawn Michaels' 37th birthday), a week after the breakup of the nWo, Triple H handed Michaels a DX T-shirt and stated that he "had an idea", suggesting that the two reform the group and make Eric Bischoff's life a living hell. The duo later came out that night to their old music, crotch chops, and pyro to the delight of the crowd. However, Triple H turned on Michaels that same night; he had teased the reunion as a ploy to appease Michaels and lure him to the ring before giving him a Pedigree, making Triple H a heel once again. This act led to the in-ring return of Michaels at SummerSlam in 2002 and was the genesis of a long feud between the two that ended with Triple H emerging victorious in a Hell in a Cell match at Bad Blood in 2004.

=== Later reformations (2006–2010, 2018) ===
In 2006, a series of events began occurring which hinted at a DX reunion. At WrestleMania 22, former members Shawn Michaels and Triple H performed the group's signature crotch chop during their respective matches (the former against Mr. McMahon, and the latter against John Cena for the WWE Championship), which was met with loud cheering from the fans in attendance. The two continued to deliver chops in the following episodes of Raw as Michaels feuded with Vince and Shane McMahon and Triple H focused on the WWE Championship, repeatedly running into the McMahons in the process.

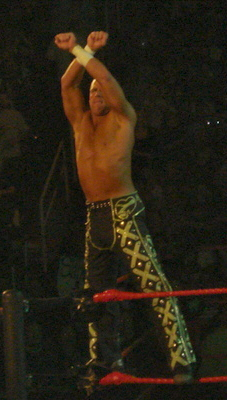
Michaels displaying the DX "X"

On the June 12 episode of Raw, the events came to a head. During Triple H's gauntlet match against The Spirit Squad, Shawn Michaels came in to help his former friend. After the duo had laid out the entire Spirit Squad, the two men put aside their past rivalry and officially reformed. DX continued their brash antics at the expense of the Spirit Squad, the McMahons, and Jonathan Coachman for several weeks and repeatedly took part in blatantly camp product placement during Raw promos. DX would defeat the Spirit Squad in a 5-on-2 handicap match at Vengeance, with Michaels forcing Mitch’s face into Triple H’s buttocks after the match concluded. Most of their antics now involved practical jokes on Vince.

On the June 26 episode of Raw, DX added to the list of parodies with Triple H impersonating Vince McMahon, talking about his love of "Dicks" (a double entendre referring to Dick Ebersol, Dick Clark, and Dick Cheney, as well as the male member; this was also used again repeatedly with roosters, saying that Vince loved "cocks"), while Michaels impersonated Shane McMahon, dancing around the ring until "Vince" screamed at him to "STOP IT!" When Vince, Shane, and the Spirit Squad came to confront them, the contents of a port-a-potty were promptly dumped on them.

On the July 3 episode of Raw, as a result of their actions on June 26, Vince banned DX from the arena; DX responded by hijacking the production truck and performing a series of pranks on Mr. McMahon, including focusing a camera on McMahon in a public restroom, which was also shown on the Raw Titantron; as well as tampering with his microphone. At the end of the episode, as Vince tried to leave in his limousine, fireworks were activated inside the limousine, shooting out of the moon roof, causing a dazed Vince to crawl out covered in soot, at which point DX greeted him with sparklers, wishing him a "Happy 4th of July".

On the August 21 episode of Raw, DX repeatedly vandalized Vince's property by tagging "DX" on Vince's $30 million private jet, on the front windows of the WWE World Headquarters building, and finally on Vince's limousine (as well as tying a chain to the back axle of the limousine, causing the axle to be violently pulled off when Vince and Shane tried to leave).

During their feud, DX defeated the Spirit Squad at Vengeance and on the July 15, 2006 edition of Saturday Night's Main Event, as well as The McMahons (Vince and Shane) at SummerSlam. At Unforgiven in a handicap Hell in a Cell match that featured Big Show on The McMahons' side, DX again came out victorious.

DX's next feud was against Rated-RKO (Edge and Randy Orton). At Cyber Sunday, the fans selected Eric Bischoff over Vince McMahon and Jonathan Coachman to be the special guest referee for the match. Bischoff allowed the illegal use of a steel chair to give Rated-RKO the win, marking DX's first defeat as a tag team since their reunion in June 2006. At Survivor Series, Michaels and Triple H got back at Edge and Orton by leading Team DX (Triple H, Michaels, Matt and Jeff Hardy, and CM Punk) to a 5–0 sweep over Team Rated-RKO (Edge, Orton, Gregory Helms, Johnny Nitro, and Mike Knox). In 2007, DX challenged for the World Tag Team Championship against Edge and Orton at New Year's Revolution. The fight ended in a no contest after Michaels hit the referee. During the match, Triple H suffered a legitimate torn quadriceps, which would put him out of action for 7 months. After the match, DX beat down Rated-RKO with steel chairs and on the announce tables.

After Triple H's injury, Shawn Michaels continued to uphold the DX image by himself leading into WrestleMania 23. Michaels would still come to the ring with the DX music and attire, even though Triple H was not joining him during this period. During this time, Michaels captured the World Tag Team Championship with John Cena, as well as earning the right to face Cena at WrestleMania 23 for the WWE Championship. It was confirmed in later interviews and documentaries that original plans called for Triple H to challenge Cena for the championship prior to his injury, after which Michaels was substituted in Triple H's place. Michaels would continue to use the D-Generation X motif until Backlash, at which point he reverted to his traditional entrance music and attire, thus ending this incarnation of DX. Michaels and Triple H teamed up again as DX on the January 28, 2008 episode of Raw defeating Umaga and Snitsky. Despite DX reforming for one night only, both Triple H and Shawn Michaels would periodically use the "crotch chop" during their solo runs.

On the September 29, 2008 episode of Raw, Triple H and Shawn Michaels once again reunited as DX to take on Chris Jericho and Lance Cade. They won by disqualification, due to Cade and Jericho's two-on-one assault of Michaels. After being mocked by John Morrison and the Miz for two weeks, on the 800th episode celebration of Raw, DX defeated the duo. During the Christmas season, DX appeared in numerous vignettes to promote DX clothing and other WWE merchandise; one such commercial also featured Kelly Kelly. In the 2009 WWE draft on April 13, 2009, Triple H was drafted back to the Raw brand.

In the midst of Triple H rejoining Raw, Michaels took a brief hiatus from WWE after losing to The Undertaker at WrestleMania 25. Meanwhile, Triple H was embroiled in a rivalry with Randy Orton and The Legacy (Cody Rhodes and Ted DiBiase). The feud continued throughout the summer with Triple H mainly combating with Orton over the WWE Championship. Eventually, Triple H would begin to target The Legacy because they were responsible for his losses against Orton during matches. After losing a handicap match to The Legacy, Triple H stated that he would "make a phone call" to Michaels in the hopes of reuniting DX. On the August 10, 2009 episode of Raw, video segments aired in which Triple H met with Michaels at an office cafeteria in Texas where he was working as a chef; throughout the segments, Triple H would try to convince Michaels to return to WWE and reform DX. After several incidents during the segments (including a grease fire and Shawn getting shouted at by a little girl), Michaels agreed to team with Triple H to face The Legacy at SummerSlam, superkicking the girl, and quitting his chef job in the process.

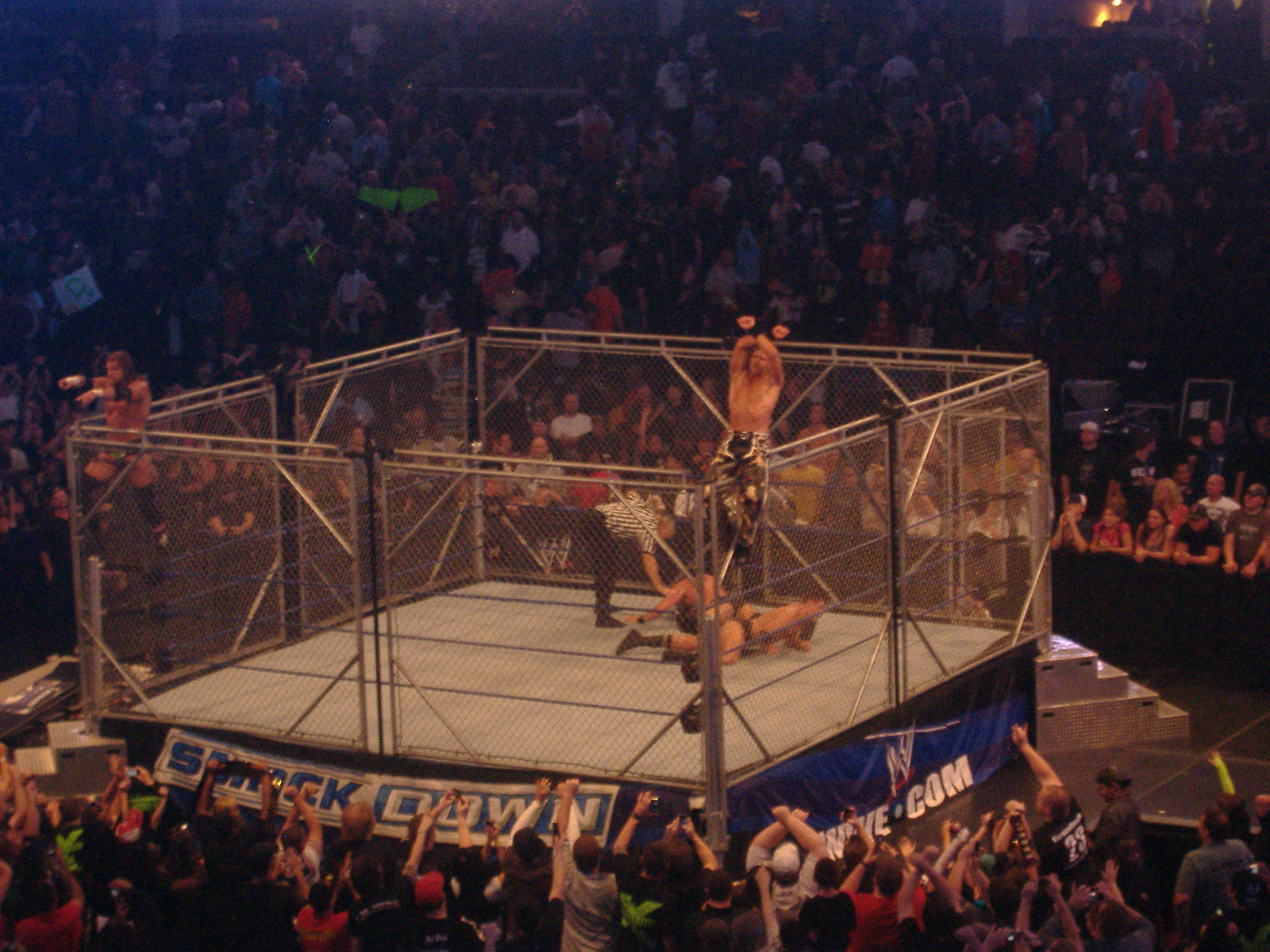
DX after a Steel Cage match against The Legacy

On the August 17 episode of Raw, Michaels and Triple H officially reunited as DX, but as they were in the middle of their in-ring promo, Legacy attacked them both. Their first match after reuniting was against Legacy at SummerSlam, which they won. At Breaking Point, however, they lost to Legacy in the first ever Submissions Count Anywhere match in WWE history. The following month at Hell in Cell, DX defeated Legacy in a Hell in a Cell match. DX would go on to challenge John Cena for the WWE Championship in a triple threat match at Survivor Series with both men failing to win the title, although they were able to retain their friendship and tag team partnership. On December 13 at TLC: Tables, Ladders and Chairs, DX defeated Jeri-Show (Chris Jericho and Big Show) to win the Unified WWE Tag Team Championship in a Tables, Ladders, and Chairs match; the first tag team championship reign for Michaels and Triple H as a tag team.

On December 21, 2009, Triple H announced that Hornswoggle was the new DX "mascot". This came about after Hornswoggle sued DX for emotional and physical distress due to them not allowing him to join the group. After being taken to "Little People's Court", where they were ruled guilty by a jury and judge consisting of dwarves, Michaels told Triple H that Hornswoggle could be the mascot. Triple H agreed to it only if the charges were dropped, which Hornswoggle agreed to. On the January 11, 2010 episode of Raw, Mike Tyson, who was the Raw guest host for the night, teamed with Jericho to face DX; however, at the end of the bout, Tyson turned on Jericho and re-aligned himself with Michaels and Triple H. On the February 8, 2010 episode of Raw, DX lost the Unified WWE Tag Team Championship to ShoMiz (The Miz and Big Show) in a Triple Threat Elimination Tag Team match also featuring The Straight Edge Society (CM Punk and Luke Gallows). On the March 1 episode of Raw, DX lost their rematch for the titles which would be the duo's last televised match as a tag team. Due to Michaels' ongoing obsession with ending the Undertaker's WrestleMania streak, Triple H and Michaels quietly separated heading into WrestleMania XXVI, but remained on good terms.

Road Dogg, Billy Gunn and X-Pac have gone under the team names of D-Generates of Wrestling and Team Suck as a tribute to D-Generation X. It while wrestling together on the indy scene before returning to WWE.

On the September 3, 2018 episode of Raw, Shawn Michaels made a special appearance to promote the match between Triple H and The Undertaker at Super Show-Down, during which he was confronted by The Undertaker himself. At Super Show-Down, Michaels assisted Triple H in defeating The Undertaker, after which, he was attacked by Undertaker and Kane.

On October 8, Triple H and Shawn Michaels announced that they were officially reforming DX to take on The Brothers of Destruction at Crown Jewel. On the October 29 episode of Raw, both Undertaker and Kane declared that they would take the souls of Triple H and Shawn Michaels and stated they would never "Rest in Peace". This then led to Triple H distracting Kane and Shawn Michaels delivering a Sweet Chin Music to the Undertaker. At Crown Jewel, the Brothers of Destruction dominated DX for most of the match, however, DX were eventually able to pick up the win despite Triple H tearing his pec.

=== Non-wrestling reunions (2010–present) ===
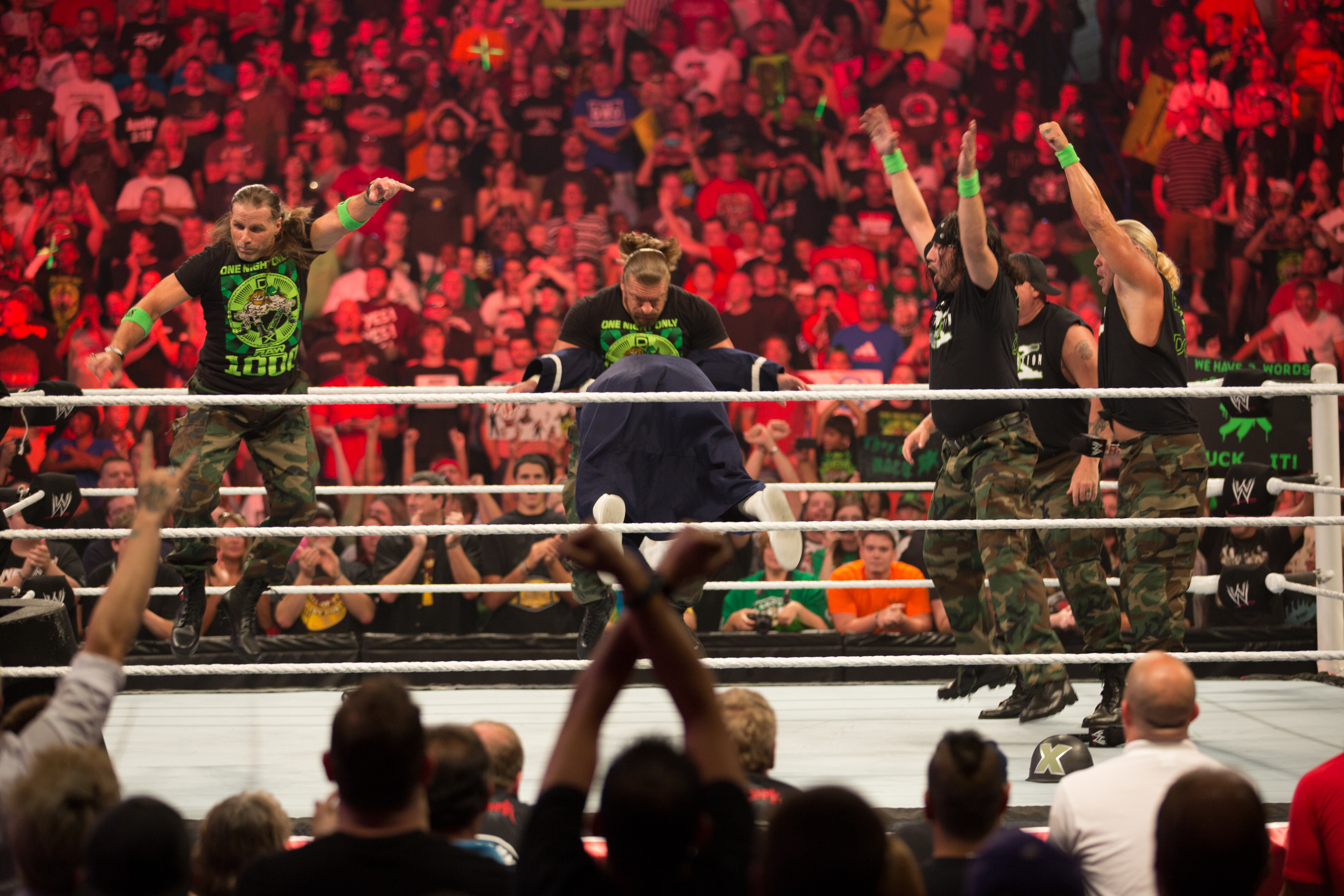
Triple H performs the Pedigree on Damien Sandow during the 2012 reunion on Raw 1000

Shawn Michaels and Triple H reunited in a non-wrestling capacity for the 2010 Tribute to the Troops, after SmackDown events in 2011 and 2012 and during the 2012 Hall of Fame ceremony when they inducted Mike Tyson. On July 23, 2012, at the 1000th episode of Raw Billy Gunn, Road Dogg, X-Pac, Shawn Michaels, and Triple H simultaneously appeared together for only the second time with all five male members present. Since then, DX reunited on several occasions, like at Raw 25, at Raw Reunion, on the October 10, 2022 episode of Raw in the celebration of the group's 25th anniversary, or at Raw is XXX.

Also, during Triple H's heel Authority storyline from 2013 to 2015, Shawn Michaels and The New Age Outlaws allied with The Authority on separate occasions. Michaels, as the guest referee for Randy Orton and Daniel Bryan's match for the vacated WWE Championship at the 2013 Hell in a Cell, superkicked Bryan during the match, resulting in Orton, The Authority's centerpiece, winning back the championship. The Outlaws won the WWE Tag Team Championship against the Rhodes Brothers (Cody Rhodes and Goldust) on the 2014 Royal Rumble pre-show, and teamed with Kane to wrestle The Shield at WrestleMania XXX in a losing effort. The last of these appearances, during Triple H's match against Sting at WrestleMania 31, was also the first legitimate major confrontation and skirmish between DX (The Outlaws and X-Pac, joined by Michaels later in the match) and the nWo (Hulk Hogan, Scott Hall and Kevin Nash). Triple H won after hitting Sting with a sledgehammer passed to him by Billy Gunn.

=== Independent circuit (2015–2016) ===
In December 2015, Billy Gunn and X-Pac reformed DX, in an event for Big Time Wrestling, where they defeated Bam Shaw and "The Punisher" Don Vega. They returned as D-Generation X during the MCW event, Spring Fever In Maryland on April 23, along with Lio Rush and Brandon Scott. They competed for Empire State Wrestling on May 21, and for Elite Pro Wrestling, where they faced the New Age Kliq on July 22.

On September 4, 2016, Gunn and X-Pac represented DX in a tag team gauntlet match at a Chikara event. The two entered the match as the final team and scored the win over Prakash Sabar and The Proletariat Boar of Moldova.

== Signature taunts ==
=== Crotch chop ===
D-X promos always include a signature gesture whereby the wrestler points his hands towards his own crotch, making the shape of a "V", and in the later, more popular variant with hands crossed, an "X". The implication is that the viewer or listener should "suck it".

The crotch chop was first used in the WWF by Sean Waltman as 1-2-3 Kid during an In Your House match against Razor Ramon. After knocking Ramon down, he seems to do the gesture almost unintentionally, but perhaps took the risk knowing it was a PPV event and thus not subject to normal censoring restrictions. Either way, the move went back to obscurity, until Shawn Michaels revived the taunt several months before the formation of D-X, at least as early as July 21, 1997, while he stood in-ring for an interview segment on Raw Is War filmed in Halifax, Nova Scotia, Canada. Although Michaels had not yet made his heel turn (which would follow a few weeks later, after the events of SummerSlam), his feud with the Canadian-born Bret Hart made Michaels a de facto heel to the Canadian crowd. Months later, at the October 6, 1997 episode of Raw Is War, both Michaels and Triple H repeatedly directed the crotch chop at both Hart and hostile members of the audience.

According to Triple H, Vince McMahon was hesitant to let D-X members perform the "X" at first, but he was later talked into it. When D-X enters the ring they do a pyro routine. Green X pyrotechnics go off three times, with D-X crotch-chopping at each firing. They then pause for a second, then chop once more as the pyrotechnics fire for the fourth time.

The crotch chop is used in the 2008 film Slumdog Millionaire by Jamal (Dev Patel) after getting away from pursuing security guards and by a character in the opening scenes of the 2007 movie Knocked Up. Fidel Edwards, the West Indian fast bowler has on occasions used numerous professional wrestling gestures (including the crotch chop and a John Cena gesture) after taking a wicket. It has also been used by Professional Bowler Pete Weber after getting a strike, Weber himself is a fan of wrestling. The character Kenny Powers, in the HBO series Eastbound & Down, also uses the gesture in a fantasy sequence where he walks through the halls of the school where he works. In a 2010 episode of Family Guy, titled "Extra Large Medium", a cutaway shows Spock doing the crotch chop after he wins the lottery. In the 2012 film, "Pitch Perfect", Becca does the crotch chop at the end of the Barden Bellas' rap in the riff off. It's also featured in Nintendo's Super Mario strikers in a taunt that Waluigi does after scoring a goal. Jon Jones performed the "X" crotch chop after defeating Daniel Cormier at UFC 197. The most recent use of the group's crotch chop that occurred on October 29, 2023, when Philadelphia 76ers player Joel Embiid performed that gesture as he and his team played the Portland Trail Blazers in the late third quarter. He was fined $35,000 by the National Basketball Association but Triple H, the current Chief Content Officer, was impressed with the gesture, has invited Embiid for a special role at WrestleMania XL in Philadelphia although the Sixers are playing the Memphis Grizzlies and the San Antonio Spurs during the same weekend.

The crotch chop appeared in an NBA game for a second time on Friday, April 26, 2024, during Game 3 of the Western Conference playoffs first round series between the Minnesota Timberwolves and Phoenix Suns. Minnesota's Anthony Edwards was doing the taunt repeatedly, not directed at an opposing player, but rather at Rudy Gobert, his own teammate. Edwards later stated in an interview alongside Gobert, "I was trying to get Rudy to do it with me but he would never make eye contact with me, which was crazy because I threw you the ball for the and one."

Teams in the Australian National Rugby League competition have also used the crotch chop to taunt opponents.

=== "Suck it!" and catchphrases/slogans ===
The crotch chop and the words "suck it" actually originated with the nWo. While Syxx/X-Pac was still a member of the faction, he along with Scott Hall and Kevin Nash would regularly perform the gesture. Later on, D-X would use a cross armed x-chop. The signature D-X slogan originated on the October 6, 1997 episode of Raw Is War, with Shawn Michaels stating, "I've got two words for 'The Hitman' Bret Hart: suck it!", before doing a one-armed crotch-chop (while holding the microphone with his other hand). Later in the episode, both Michaels and Triple H (separately) proceeded to the ring for the Bret Hart-Triple H match, each of them directing the slogan and crotch-chops at fans seated along the entry ramp, as well as the viewers watching at home. "Oh you didn't know? Your ass better call somebody."

The slogan is also used in the D-X Army's popular "Let's get ready to suck it!" promos, conceived as a parody of Michael Buffer's "Let's get ready to rumble!" match introduction that was routinely featured at televised WCW events. The routine originated in the "D-X Army" era with X-Pac, Road Dogg, and Billy Gunn and starts when Triple H asks the audience, "Are you ready?". He then shouts, "No, [city name], I said, are you ready?!", or "I thought this was [city name], I said, are you ready?!", to elicit a louder reaction from the crowd. He would continue on, in a similar cadence and voice to Buffer, "Then, for the thousands in attendance, and to the millions watching at home: let's get ready to suck it!". Following this, Road Dogg would announce a variation of "Ladies and gentlemen, boys and girls, children of all ages: D-Generation X proudly brings to you its WWF Tag Team Champions of the World! The Road Dogg Jesse James, The Bad Ass Billy Gunn: The New Age Outlaws!" In which, the variation is, they would call themselves the "soon-to-be WWF Tag Team Champions of the world" only if they weren't holding the championship at the time. The group would then talk or posture in relation to the people they were feuding with at the time. Billy Gunn would then end the routine with "And if you're not down with that, we got two words for ya!" to which the crowd shouts "suck it!" back at them.

During the tag team revival of the group in later years, the routine was truncated so that Triple H would say his part while Michaels would take Billy Gunn's lines to conclude it. They often would just say these two parts, with brief ad libbing, rather than lengthy speeches each time.

== Members ==
=== Timeline ===
| Incarnation: | Notes | Members |
|---|---|---|
| First | Shawn Michaels and Triple H along with Chyna began teaming on August 11, 1997, with Rick Rude accompanying the group as Michaels' storyline insurance policy | Shawn Michaels (leader and founding member; formed D-X on the October 13, 1997 episode of Raw Is War; expelled from group on the March 30, 1998 episode of Raw Is War); Triple H (founding member; formed D-X on the October 13, 1997 episode of Raw Is War); Chyna (founding member; formed D-X on the October 13, 1997 episode of Raw Is War); Rick Rude (founding member; formed D-X on October 13, 1997, episode of Raw Is War; defected to nWo on the November 17, 1997 episode of Nitro); Mike Tyson (joined on the March 2, 1998 episode of Raw Is War; left the group on March 29, 1998 at WrestleMania XIV) |
| Second | Shawn Michaels left WWF after "dropping the ball" and losing to Steve Austin at WrestleMania XIV. Triple H assumed leadership following this and recruited X-Pac, Road Dogg, and Billy Gunn | Triple H (leader and founding member; defected to The Corporation on March 28, 1999 at WrestleMania XV); Chyna (founding member; defected to The Corporation on the January 25, 1999 episode of Raw Is War); X-Pac (joined on the March 30, 1998 episode of Raw Is War); Road Dogg (joined on the March 30, 1998 episode of Raw Is War); Billy Gunn (joined on the March 30, 1998 episode of Raw Is War) |
| Third | Membership of the group came down to X-Pac and Road Dogg who maintained the D-X name after winning the rights to use it from Triple H and Chyna. Kane was never an official member, although he walked down to the ring with the group and won tag titles with X-Pac | X-Pac; Road Dogg |
| Fourth (The McMahon-Helmsley Faction) | The group reformed after Triple H and X-Pac aligned with the New Age Outlaws who had reunited a month previously. Kane was never an official member. Triple H assumed leadership and associated the group with his new wife Stephanie McMahon and father-in-law Vince McMahon and Shane McMahon. The group gradually broke apart, culminating in late 2000 with Road Dogg turning on X-Pac. | Triple H (leader and founding member); X-Pac; Road Dogg; Billy Gunn (expelled on the February 28, 2000 episode of Raw Is War); Tori (joined on the January 27, 2000 episode of SmackDown!; last appeared with D-X June 25, 2000 at King of the Ring); Stephanie McMahon-Helmsley (joined on December 12, 1999 at Armageddon) |
| Fifth | The group eventually reformed in 2006 as a tag team with original founding members Shawn Michaels and Triple H. This incarnation of D-X would appear throughout the following years | Shawn Michaels (co-leader and founding member; 2006–2007; 2009–2010; 2018); Triple H (co-leader and founding member; 2006–2007; 2009–2010; 2018); Hornswoggle (joined on the December 21, 2009 episode of Monday Night Raw; last appeared with D-X on the January 18, 2010 episode of Monday Night Raw) |

== Championships and accomplishments ==
- CBS Sports
  - Worst Angle of the Year (2018) Triple H & Shawn Michaels vs. The Brothers of Destruction
- Pro Wrestling Illustrated
  - Comeback of the Year (1998) – X-Pac
  - Tag Team of the Year (1998) – The New Age Outlaws
- World Wrestling Federation/World Wrestling Entertainment/WWE
  - WWF Championship (4 times) – Shawn Michaels (1), Triple H (3)
  - WWF Intercontinental Championship (4 times) – Triple H (1), Road Dogg (1), Chyna (2)
  - WWF European Championship (5 times) – Shawn Michaels (1), Triple H (2), X-Pac (2)
  - WWF Hardcore Championship (2 times) – Road Dogg (1), Billy Gunn (1)
  - WWF/World Tag Team Championship (8 times) – The New Age Outlaws (5), X-Pac and Kane (2) Triple H and Shawn Michaels (1)
  - WWE Tag Team Championship (2 times) – Shawn Michaels and Triple H (1), The New Age Outlaws (Road Dogg and Billy Gunn) (1)
  - WWF Women's Championship (1 times) – Stephanie McMahon-Helmsley (1),
  - WWE Hall of Fame (Class of 2019) – Triple H, Shawn Michaels, Chyna, X-Pac, Billy Gunn, Road Dogg
- Wrestling Observer Newsletter
  - Worst Feud of the Year (2006) vs. Vince and Shane McMahon
  - Worst Match of the Year (2018) vs. The Brothers of Destruction Tag Team match
  - Worst Gimmick (2009) - Hornswoggle
  - Worst Feud of the Year (2009) Hornswoggle vs. Chavo Guerrero
- WrestleCrap
  - Gooker Award (2009) Hornswoggle vs. Chavo Guerrero Feud

== Media ==
- WWF – D-Generation X (1998, VHS)
- WWE – D-Generation X (June 2, 2006, DVD)
- The New and Improved D-Generation X (February 20, 2007, DVD)
- DX: One Last Stand (August 6, 2013, DVD)
