= Cyber Sunday (2006) =

World Wrestling Entertainment pay-per-view event

- Promotional poster featuring Maria
- Promotion: World Wrestling Entertainment
- Brand: Raw
- Date: November 5, 2006
- City: Cincinnati, Ohio
- Venue: U.S. Bank Arena
- Attendance: 7,000
- Buy rate: 228,000
- Tagline: Log on. Take over.

Pay-per-view chronology
← Previous; No Mercy	Next → Survivor Series

Taboo Tuesday/Cyber Sunday chronology
← Previous; Taboo Tuesday	Next → 2007

The 2006 Cyber Sunday was a professional wrestling pay-per-view (PPV) event produced by World Wrestling Entertainment (WWE). It was the third annual Taboo Tuesday/Cyber Sunday and took place on November 5, 2006, at the U.S. Bank Arena in Cincinnati, Ohio, held primarily for wrestlers from the promotion's Raw brand division. The concept was that it was an interactive pay-per-view in which fans could vote on aspects of the matches, like stipulations or participants. The voting started on October 16, 2006, through WWE's official website and ended during the broadcast.

The event was previously known as Taboo Tuesday in 2004 and 2005. For 2006, the event was moved to the more traditional Sunday night for PPV events and was renamed as Cyber Sunday. This was also the final Taboo Tuesday/Cyber Sunday to be brand-exclusive as following WrestleMania 23 the following year, brand-exclusive PPVs were discontinued.

The main event was the "Champion of Champions" match between WWE's three top champions. The three champions in the match Raw's WWE Champion John Cena, SmackDown!'s World Heavyweight Champion King Booker, and ECW's World Champion Big Show. The fans could vote for who would defend their championship in this match; the fans voted for King Booker, who won the match by pinning Cena following interference from Kevin Federline. The predominant match on the card was D-Generation X (Triple H and Shawn Michaels) versus Rated-RKO (Edge and Randy Orton). Rated-RKO won the match after Orton pinned Triple H following an RKO onto a steel chair. The featured matches on the undercard were Jeff Hardy versus Carlito for the WWE Intercontinental Championship and Lita versus Mickie James in a Diva Lumberjack match for the WWE Women's Championship.

== Production ==
=== Background ===
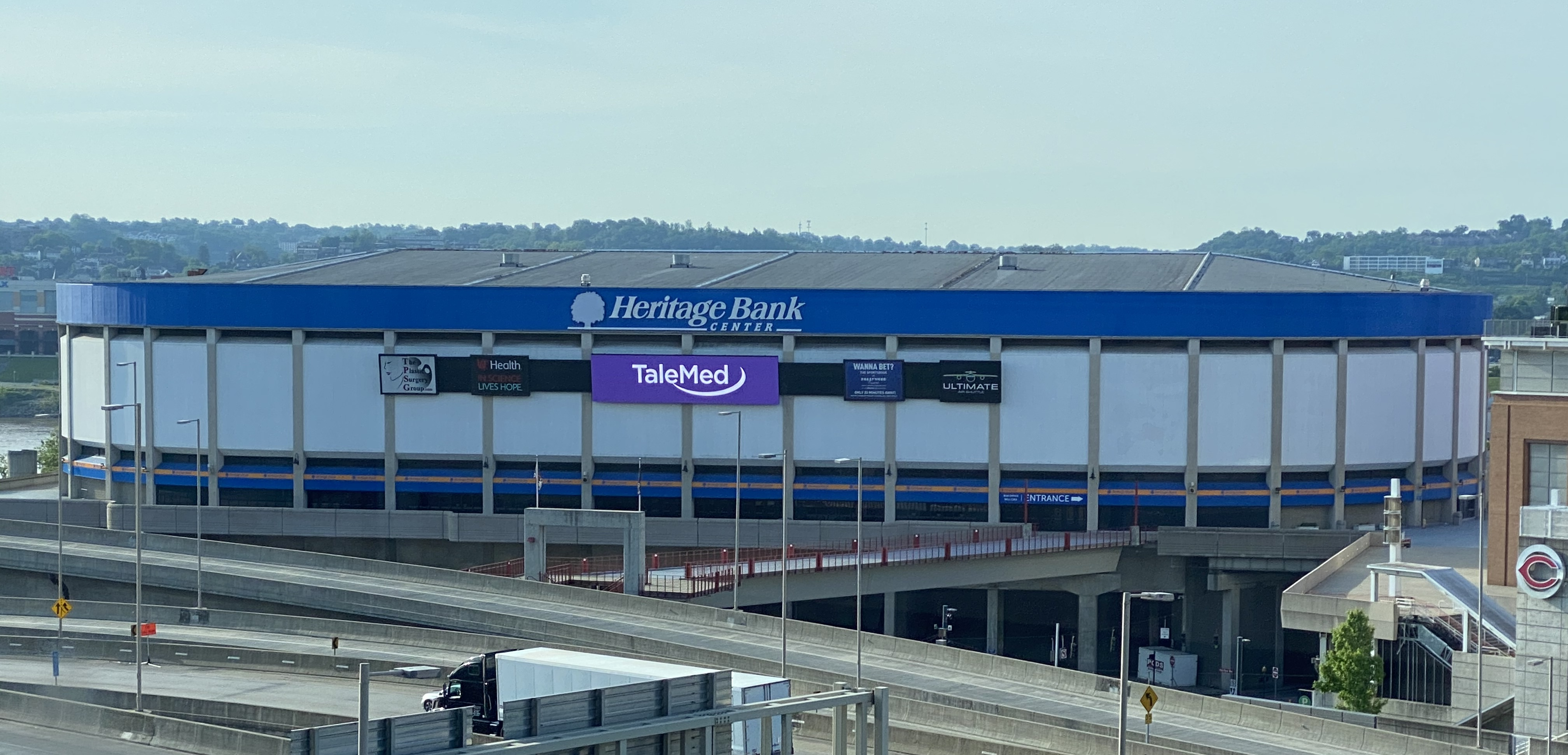
The event was held at the U.S. Bank Arena in Cincinnati, Ohio.

In 2004, World Wrestling Entertainment (WWE) established a professional wrestling pay-per-view (PPV) event entitled Taboo Tuesday. The title not only referred to the day of its scheduling, but also because of its unique theme in which fans had the ability to vote on certain aspects of every match. Because of this, the event was billed as an "interactive pay-per-view". For WWE's third interactive PPV, the event was moved to the more traditional Sunday night for PPV events and it was subsequently renamed as Cyber Sunday. It was scheduled for November 5, 2006, at the U.S. Bank Arena in Cincinnati, Ohio. Voting for the event began on October 16, 2006, on WWE's official website and ended during the broadcast. Like the previous two years's events, it was held exclusively for wrestlers from the Raw brand division, with a couple of exceptions.

=== Storylines ===
The main feud heading into Cyber Sunday was between Raw's WWE Champion John Cena, SmackDown!'s World Heavyweight Champion King Booker, and ECW's World Champion Big Show, the top champion of each of the three brands. This feud began on the October 9 edition of Raw, where they came face to face, arguing about who was the most dominant champion in WWE. WWE Chairman Vince McMahon interrupted, and booked a triple threat "Champion of Champions" match at Cyber Sunday between the three of them. This also gave each show's General Manager an opportunity to choose opponents for each other's champion that night. This resulted in Big Show defeating Jeff Hardy and King Booker defeating Rob Van Dam; however, the match between Cena and The Undertaker was interrupted by King Booker, Big Show, and The Undertaker's storyline rival, Mr. Kennedy. At the same time, Cena began a minor feud with Kevin Federline. Federline, as the on-screen close friend of Johnny Nitro and Melina's, appeared on Raw to promote his album, "Playing With Fire". Cena rapped about Federline, but Nitro came out to Federline's defense and was thrown out of the ring by Cena. Cena was then interrupted by his two Cyber Sunday opponents and McMahon, who announced that a championship would be on the line at Cyber Sunday. Cena performed the FU on Federline, after being insulted. The feud between the champions continued on the October 20 episode of SmackDown!, when Big Show and Cena were at ringside during King Booker's title defense against Batista. Batista speared King Booker onto Big Show, who, in response, assaulted Batista, ending the match via disqualification. Cena then joined the brawl, and SmackDown! General Manager Theodore Long announced a tag team match for the next week. On the next Raw, Cena defeated Nitro after an FU, but was assaulted afterwards by his Cyber Sunday opponents, who turned on each other shortly after to start a brawl between the four to end the show. Batista and Cena were successful in the tag team match, after Big Show abandoned King Booker. The next week, on Raw, a preview of Cyber Sunday's interactivity was displayed when fans voted for Cena's opponent for the night, between Big Show, King Booker, and Jonathan Coachman. Coachman won in the voting, but was easily defeated by Cena.

The main feud on the undercard was between D-Generation X (Triple H and Shawn Michaels) and Rated-RKO (Edge and Randy Orton). The feud began to develop on the October 9 edition of Raw, when Edge convinced Orton that Triple H was the reason for their unsuccess. Orton lost the World Heavyweight Championship to Triple H in 2004, and Edge lost a title match due to interference from DX the previous week. This led to Edge and Orton joining forces. On the next episode of Raw, Edge praised Mr. McMahon's booking skills and suggested that he and Orton have a match with DX at Cyber Sunday where fans could choose a special guest referee. Mr. McMahon liked the idea, and decided for the options to be Coachman, Eric Bischoff, and himself. The following week, Orton pinned Triple H in a match after hitting Triple H in the head with a steel chair. Coachman had been the special guest referee, but Michaels superkicked him after he tried to count the pinfall, after Edge had interfered. On October 30, McMahon, Coachman, and Bischoff were guests on Edge's talkshow, The Cutting Edge, and McMahon booked a match between Orton and Triple H for later that night, with Edge as the guest referee. Before the match could start, however, Triple H performed a Pedigree on Edge, meaning he couldn't officiate. Edge recovered and interfered, meaning the match ended in a no-contest. Edge and Orton attacked Triple H with steel chairs, until Triple H got his sledgehammer and retaliated.

== Event ==
Other on-screen personnel
Role:	Name:
English commentators	Jim Ross
English commentators	Jerry Lawler
Spanish commentators	Carlos Cabrera
Spanish commentators	Hugo Savinovich
Backstage interviewer	Todd Grisham
Ring announcer	Lilian Garcia
Referees	Mike Chioda
Referees	Eric Bischoff
Referees	Jack Doan
Referees	Chad Patton

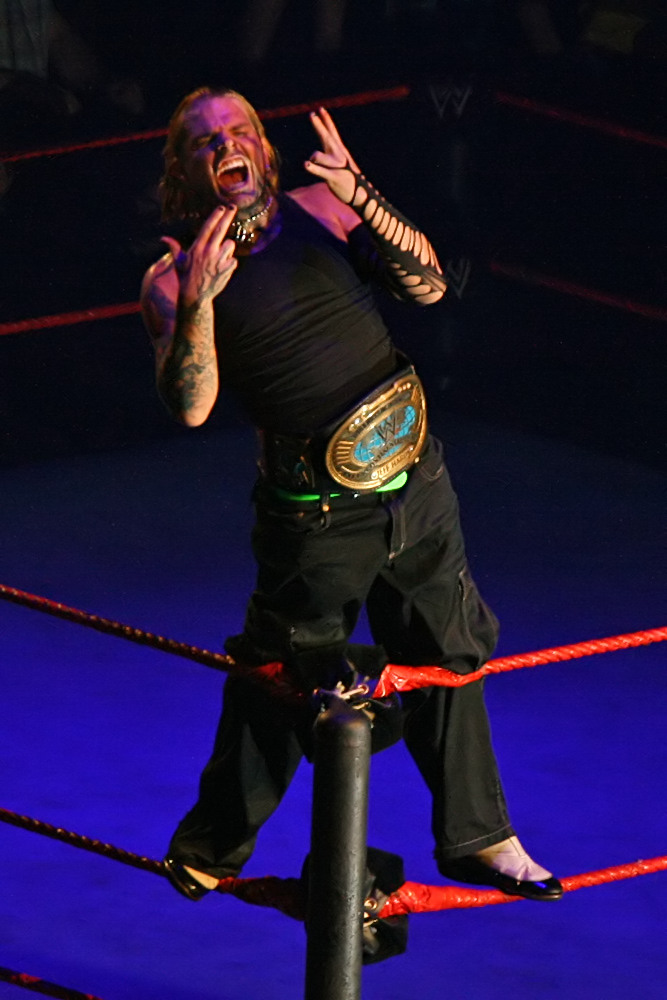
Jeff Hardy as the Intercontinental Champion.

Before the event went live on pay-per-view, Super Crazy defeated Rob Conway in a non-televised match.

The first match saw Umaga face Kane, who had won the vote with 49%. The match moved to the outside, where Umaga missed a Samoan Spike, hitting the ringpost. Kane executed two Corner Clotheslines but Umaga countered with a Samoan Drop. Kane performed a Back Suplex and attempted a Diving Clothesline but Umaga retaliated with a Clothesline and executed a Samoan Spike for the win.

The second match was the Texas Tornado match between Cryme Tyme, the Highlanders, Lance Cade and Trevor Murdoch, and Charlie Haas and Viscera. The match began with the Highlanders and Cade and Murdoch brawling outside the ring and Cryme Tyme and Haas and Viscera brawling in the ring. The Highlanders gained the advantage, performing stereo Planchas. Haas and Viscera took control until Viscera accidentally hit Haas. Cade and Murdoch performed Sweet and Sour on Robbie of the Highlanders, but were thrown out of the ring by Cryme Tyme, who pinned Robbie for the win.

The next match was the Intercontinental Championship match between Jeff Hardy and Carlito, who earned 62% of the vote. After a handshake, both men attempted quick pinning combinations. Carlito countered a Swanton Bomb by raising his knees. Carlito performed a Springboard Corkscrew Senton for a near-fall. Hardy was able to perform Whisper in the Wind. Hardy climbed to the top rope, and when Carlito attempted to stop him, he was pushed and fell to the floor. Hardy performed the Swanton Bomb to retain the title.

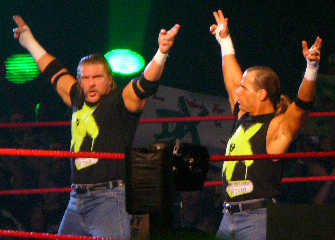
D-Generation X lost to Rated-RKO.

The fourth match was between Rated-RKO (Edge and Randy Orton) and D-Generation X (Shawn Michaels and Triple H) with Eric Bischoff, who won the vote with 60%, as special guest referee. Michaels took control of Edge and tagged in Triple H. Orton and Edge gained control over Michaels after they pulled him into the ringpost. While Bischoff was preventing Triple H from entering the ring, Rated-RKO continued to double team Michaels and Orton performed a Backbreaker. Edge attempted to perform a Spear on Michaels but hit Bischoff instead. Referee Chad Patton entered the ring to replace Bischoff, and after a Spear and RKO to Triple H, Orton pinned him for a near-fall. Orton attempted another RKO on Triple H but Michaels interrupted and superkicked him. Bischoff prevented Patton from counting the pin, and Michaels tried to pursue him but Edge hit him with a chair. Orton performed an RKO onto a chair on Triple H for the win.

The next match was the final of the tournament for the WWE Women's Championship between Lita and Mickie James. The match was the first ever Lumberjill match (the female version of a lumberjack match), which gained 46% of the vote. The match begun with both Divas throwing the other outside the ring to try to gain an advantage. Lita dominated the early proceedings, applying a sleeper hold until James countered with a cross-arm breaker. Lita executed a DDT to win the title.

In the sixth match, The Spirit Squad defended the World Tag Team Championship against Ric Flair and Roddy Piper, who won the voting with 46%. Sgt. Slaughter and Dusty Rhodes accompanied Flair and Piper to ringside. Kenny and Mikey were the two Spirit Squad members to defend the title. Flair tagged in Piper, who the Spirit Squad dominated. After Mikey missed a Splash, Piper tagged in Flair. Flair applied the Figure Four Leglock on Mikey but Kenny broke the hold with a Guillotine leg drop on Flair. Flair made Mikey submit to the Figure Four Leglock to win the title for his team. After the match, Flair, Piper, Slaughter, and Rhodes celebrated in the ring after stopping the Spirit Squad from attacking Flair and Piper.

The main event was the "Champion of Champions" match between Raw's WWE Champion John Cena, SmackDown!'s World Heavyweight Champion King Booker, and ECW World Champion Big Show. The fans voted for the World Heavyweight Championship to be defended. At the start of the match, King Booker tried to team with Cena but was prevented by Big Show, who began to dominate. King Booker and Cena combined to clothesline Big Show over the top rope and they fought. Cena tried an FU but King Booker countered with a DDT. Big Show performed a chokeslam on King Booker. He attempted a chokeslam through a broadcast table on Cena but Cena countered and threw him into the ringpost. Cena performed an FU on Queen Sharmell when she attempted to hit him with the title belt. Cena applied the STFU on King Booker, but while the referee was tending to Sharmell, Kevin Federline hit Cena with the title belt. King Booker hit Cena with the title belt and pinned Cena to retain the title.

== Aftermath ==
After his involvement in the main event, Kevin Federline challenged John Cena to a match on the January 1, 2007, episode of Raw, a match he won due to interference of Umaga who was in a midst of a feud with Cena. Shortly after this match, Cena defeated Umaga at New Year's Revolution with a roll-up, ending Umaga's one year undefeated streak. Then at the Royal Rumble Cena defeated Umaga again in a Last Man Standing match. After the Royal Rumble Cena and Umaga's feud ended.

Roddy Piper and Ric Flair dropped the World Tag Team Championship two weeks later, to Rated-RKO after Piper was told he had cancer. The Spirit Squad continued their feud with Flair, and were defeated by him, and fellow "legends" at Survivor Series. The night after Survivor Series, the Spirit Squad were defeated in their last match on Raw, and the stable disbanded. Kenny was the only member to stay on WWE television.

D-Generation X and Rated-RKO continued feuding, and at Survivor Series, Team DX won with a clean sweep of Team Rated-RKO. The feud continued until New Year's Revolution, where the match between them for the World Tag Team Championship ended in a No Contest after Triple H delivered a Spinebuster on Orton and tore his quadriceps which was the main cause for the end of the DX return storyline.

After she won her fourth WWE Women's Championship, Lita continued her feud with Mickie James, with Lita winning two and losing one of three non-title handicap matches against James on Raw where James had, respectively, one hand tied behind her back, her feet tied together and blindfolded, with James able to win the second of those matches after DX squirted mustard in Lita's face. After Lita announced her retirement after Survivor Series, she lost the title to James at Survivor Series on November 26.

The next night on Raw, Johnny Nitro defeated Jeff Hardy in a No Disqualification match to win the WWE Intercontinental Championship after having been disqualified in a subsequent match moments before. The next week, however, Hardy defeated Nitro to win the title for the third time. Hardy and Nitro continued to feud, and they both reunited with their former tag team partners, Hardy with his brother, Matt, and Nitro reformed MNM with Joey Mercury. The Hardys defeated MNM at the Royal Rumble, and Hardy defeated Nitro in a steel cage match at New Year's Revolution to retain the Intercontinental Championship.

The 2006 Cyber Sunday would be the final event in the interactive PPVs chronology to be Raw-exclusive, as following WrestleMania 23 in April 2007, WWE discontinued brand-exclusive PPVs.

== Results ==
No.	Results	Stipulations	Times
1^{D}	Super Crazy defeated Rob Conway by pinfall	Singles match	3:26
2	Umaga (with Armando Alejandro Estrada) defeated Kane by pinfall	Singles match	8:39
3	Cryme Tyme (JTG and Shad Gaspard) defeated The Highlanders (Robbie McAllister and Rory McAllister), Charlie Haas and Viscera, and Lance Cade and Trevor Murdoch by pinfall	Texas Tornado match	4:28
4	Jeff Hardy (c) defeated Carlito by pinfall	Singles match for the WWE Intercontinental Championship	13:21
5	Rated-RKO (Edge and Randy Orton) defeated D-Generation X (Shawn Michaels and Triple H) by pinfall	Tag team match with Eric Bischoff as special guest referee	18:11
6	Lita defeated Mickie James by pinfall	Lumberjill match for the vacant WWE Women's Championship	8:09
7	Ric Flair and Roddy Piper (with Dusty Rhodes and Sgt. Slaughter) defeated The Spirit Squad (Kenny and Mikey) (c) (with Johnny, Mitch and Nicky) by pinfall	Tag team match for the World Tag Team Championship	6:55
8	King Booker (c) (with Queen Sharmell) defeated Big Show and John Cena by pinfall	Triple threat match for the World Heavyweight Championship	21:05
(c) / – the champion(s) heading into the match; D / – this was a dark match

=== Voting results ===
Poll	Results
Opponent for Umaga	Kane (49%); The Sandman (28%); Chris Benoit (23%)
Stipulations for Cryme Tyme vs The Highlanders vs Haas and Viscera vs Cade and Murdoch	Texas Tornado (50%); Tag Team Turmoil (35%); Fatal Four-Way (15%)
Opponent for Jeff Hardy	Carlito (62%); Shelton Benjamin (25%); Johnny Nitro (13%)
Special guest referee for Edge & Orton vs D-Generation X	Eric Bischoff (60%); Jonathan Coachman (20%); Vince McMahon (20%)
Stipulations for Lita vs Mickie James	Diva Lumberjill match (46%); No Disqualification match (40%); Submission match (14%)
Ric Flair's partner against the Spirit Squad	Roddy Piper (46%); Dusty Rhodes (35%); Sgt. Slaughter (19%)
Title to be defended in Champion of Champions match	World Heavyweight Championship (67%); ECW World Championship (21%); WWE Championship (12%)

=== WWE Women's Championship Tournament ===
1st Round; Raw; September 25 – October 15, 2006 (Aired: October 16)
Lita	Pinfall (Note: Edge was the special guest referee.)
Candice Michelle	0:28
Maria	Win (Note: Maria vs. Candice Michelle vs. Victoria vs. Torrie Wilson in the 1st round was a Bra and Panties Match.)
Candice Michelle Torrie Wilson Victoria	1:14
Mickie James	Pinfall
Victoria	2:51
Melina	Pinfall (Note: Melina vs. Torrie Wilson in the 1st Round was a Lumberjill match.)
Torrie Wilson	2:43

Semifinals; Raw; October 23–30, 2006
Lita	Pinfall
Maria	2:19
Mickie James	Pinfall
Melina	4:00

Final; Cyber Sunday; November 5, 2006
Lita	Pinfall (Note: Lita vs. Mickie James in the Final was a Lumberjill match.)
Mickie James	8:09
