= Taboo Tuesday (2005) =

World Wrestling Entertainment pay-per-view event

- Promotional poster featuring Kurt Angle, Eric Bischoff, and John Cena
- Promotion: World Wrestling Entertainment
- Brand: Raw
- Date: November 1, 2005
- City: San Diego, California
- Venue: iPayOne Center
- Attendance: 6,000
- Buy rate: 174,000
- Tagline: Log on. Take over.

Pay-per-view chronology
← Previous; No Mercy	Next → Survivor Series

Taboo Tuesday/Cyber Sunday chronology
← Previous; 2004	Next → Cyber Sunday

The 2005 Taboo Tuesday was a professional wrestling pay-per-view (PPV) event produced by World Wrestling Entertainment (WWE). It was the second annual Taboo Tuesday/Cyber Sunday and took place on Tuesday, November 1, 2005, at the iPayOne Center in San Diego, California, held exclusively for wrestlers from the promotion's Raw brand division. The concept was that it was an interactive pay-per-view in which fans could vote on aspects of the matches, like stipulations or participants. The voting started on October 24, 2005, through WWE's official website and ended during the broadcast. This was the final event titled Taboo Tuesday, as the following year, the event was moved to the traditional Sunday nights for PPVs and was renamed as Cyber Sunday.

Eight professional wrestling matches were featured on the event's card. The main event was a triple threat match, for the WWE Championship. In this match, John Cena defeated Kurt Angle and Shawn Michaels to retain his title. Two bouts were featured on the undercard. In a retrospective singles match for the WWE Intercontinental Championship, Ric Flair defeated Triple H in a Steel Cage match, in which Flair won by escaping the cage and having both feet touch the arena floor. The other featured an interpromotional tag team match where Rey Mysterio and Matt Hardy (SmackDown!) defeated Chris Masters and Snitsky (Raw).

Taboo Tuesday received 174,000 pay-per-view buys, which was the same amount as the previous year's event. The professional wrestling section of the Canadian Online Explorer website rated the entire event 7 out of 10 stars, higher than the 2004 event rating of 5 out of 10 stars.

== Production ==
=== Background ===
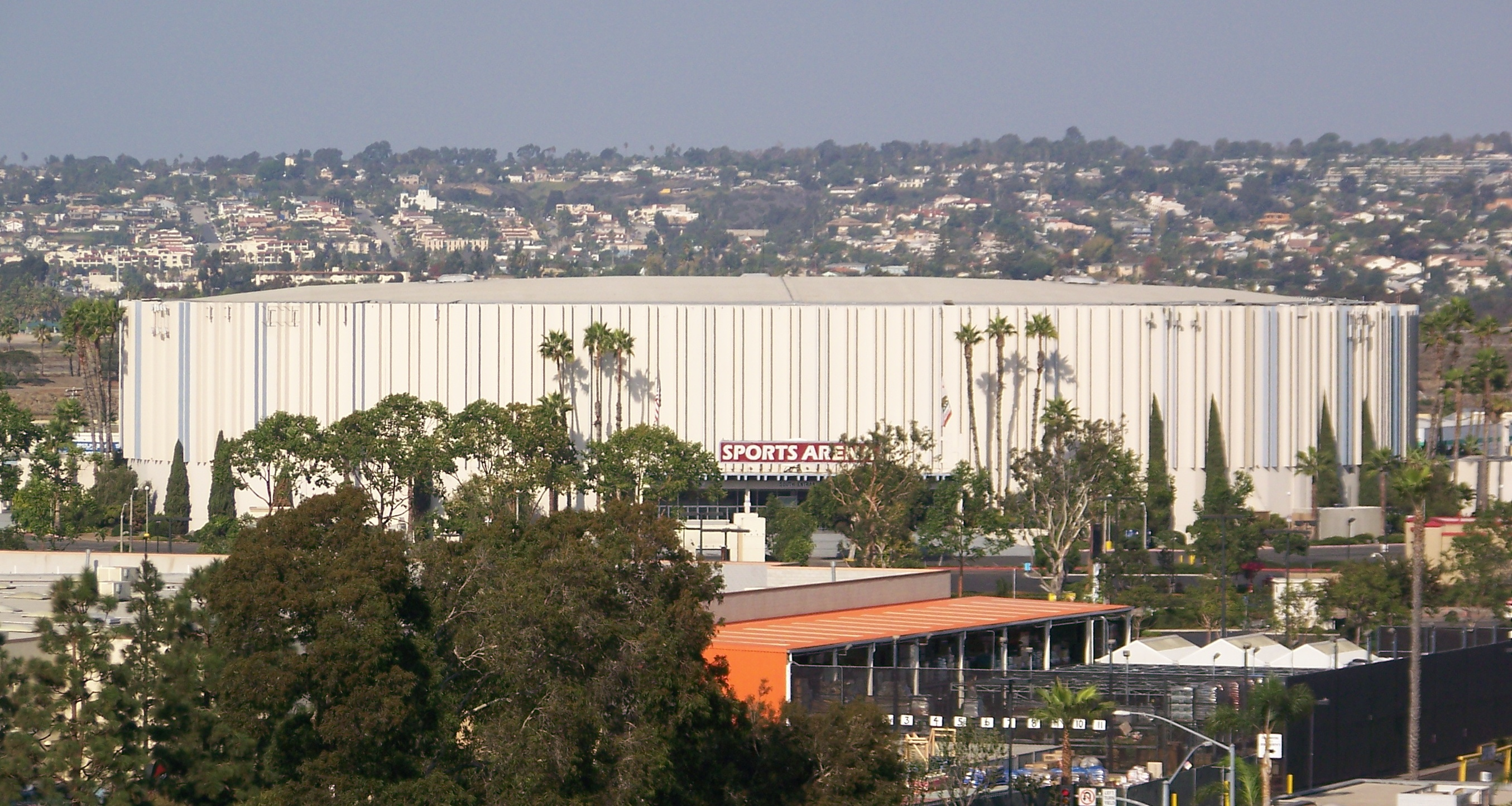
The second annual Taboo Tuesday was held at the iPayOne Center in San Diego, California.

In 2004, World Wrestling Entertainment (WWE) held a professional wrestling pay-per-view (PPV) event entitled Taboo Tuesday. The title not only referred to the day of its scheduling, but also because of its unique theme in which fans had the ability to vote on certain aspects of every match. Because of this, the event was billed as an "interactive pay-per-view". Additionally, it was the first regularly scheduled pay-per-view by WWE on a Tuesday since 1991's This Tuesday in Texas, the first regularly scheduled non-Sunday pay-per-view since the 1994 Survivor Series, and the first non-Sunday pay-per-view of any kind since In Your House 8: Beware of Dog 2 in 1996.

A second Taboo Tuesday was scheduled for November 1, 2005, at the iPayOne Center in San Diego, California, thus establishing the interactive PPV as an annual event for the promotion. Voting began on October 24 on WWE's official website and concluded during the broadcast. Like the previous year, it was held exclusively for wrestlers of the Raw brand.

=== Storylines ===
Unlike other WWE pay-per-views, where stipulations were determined by WWE's creative staff, this was the second event where stipulations for matches were determined by votes from WWE fans conducted on WWE's official website. The event was scheduled to feature eight professional wrestling matches. Although the stipulations resulted from votes by WWE fans, different wrestlers were involved in pre-existing scripted feuds, plots and storylines, which led to scheduled matches in which WWE fans could vote upon stipulations.

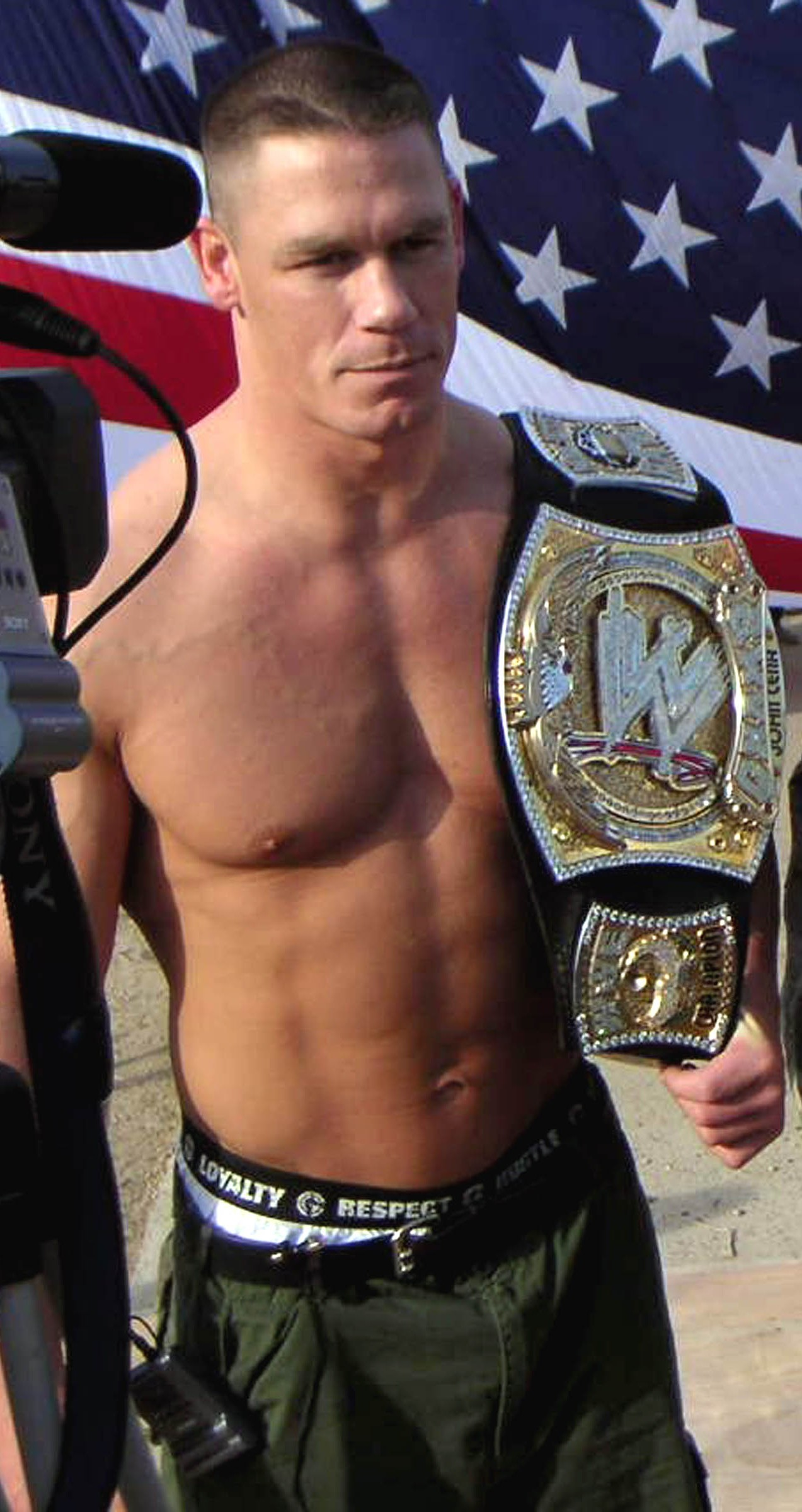
WWE Champion John Cena

The main event scripted into Taboo Tuesday was between John Cena and Kurt Angle for the WWE Championship, in which Cena would also defend the title against the fans' choice of three possible opponents: Kane, The Big Show, and Shawn Michaels. The buildup to the match began at Unforgiven, Raw's previous pay-per-view event, in which Cena intentionally disqualified himself. In WWE, a championship cannot change hands via count-out or disqualification, as a result, Cena retained the title. On the October 17 episode of Raw, one of WWE's primary television programs, General manager Eric Bischoff, a portrayed match maker and rules enforcer, announced that a standard match involving three wrestlers, termed as a Triple Threat match, for the WWE Championship, would take place between Cena, Angle and the fans' choice at Taboo Tuesday. Bischoff was scripted to promote three series of qualifying matches, in which the winner would receive a spot on the ballot as a potential challenger to Cena and Angle. The winners were Kane, The Big Show, and Shawn Michaels. The following week, a Triple Threat match was scheduled between the three competitors. Michaels won the match after he delivered a superkick to Big Show and Kane and pinned the Big Show for the win. The following week, Bischoff announced a singles match between Cena and Michaels. Late in the match, Angle attacked both Cena and Michaels. Cena, however, retaliated and lifted Angle up on his shoulders, but Michaels managed to deliver a superkick to Cena.

One of the featured preliminary matches was between Ric Flair versus Triple H for the WWE Intercontinental Championship. On the October 3 episode of Raw, WWE Homecoming, Triple H returned after a four-month hiatus. He took part in a match, teaming up with Flair, who was a fan favorite during Triple H's absence, to take on Chris Masters and Carlito. The duo defeated Masters and Carlito; after the match, Triple H turned on Flair and hit him with a sledgehammer and officially marked the end of Evolution after more than two years since 2003. The following week, Triple H explained his actions, saying he saw that Flair had become mediocre when he was spat at and when he won the Intercontinental title. Triple H continued to say that he needed to end Flair's career so his memories of Flair would not be tarnished. On the October 24 episode of Raw, a singles match was scheduled between Flair and Triple H at Taboo Tuesday, in which the fans would be given the opportunity to choose the type of match they compete in. The choice of the matches were a regular match, submission match, or a Steel Cage match for the Intercontinental title.

Another preliminary match was between the Raw and SmackDown! brands. The feud began on the October 3 episode of Raw, in which WWE Chairman Vince McMahon wanted a match between SmackDown! wrestlers on the program. A match was scheduled, but before it could get underway, Eric Bischoff announced that McMahon had left the arena, thus leaving himself in charge. Seeing SmackDown! as inferior, Bischoff stopped the match by turning off the lights and going to a commercial break. At the end of the broadcast, SmackDown! General Manager Theodore Long, led SmackDown! superstars to the ring, and they fought with Raw superstars. On the October 17 episode of Raw, John "Bradshaw" Layfield's (JBL) (SmackDown!) entrance music played during Edge's (Raw) match, the distraction caused Edge to lose the match. As part of the storyline, Edge and Chris Masters showed up to the SmackDown! program on the October 21 episode, in which they interfered in a match between JBL and Rey Mysterio Jr., where they assaulted Mysterio. On the October 24 episode of Raw, a match was made between Edge and Masters, and two of five SmackDown! superstars chosen by the fans, and Mysterio attacked Edge from behind. The following week, Bischoff invited Mysterio to the Raw program to take the Master Lock Challenge, a challenge where the wrestler must break free from Masters' swinging full nelson submission hold, which he calls the Master Lock. Mysterio, however, attacked Masters instead, which caused Bischoff to call for other Raw superstars. Long called for SmackDown! superstars, and they fought until the Raw roster retreated.

== Event ==
Other on-screen personnel
Role:	Name:
English commentators	Joey Styles
English commentators	Jerry Lawler
Spanish commentators	Carlos Cabrera
Spanish commentators	Hugo Savinovich
Interviewer	Todd Grisham
Ring announcer	Lilian Garcia
Referees	Nick Patrick
Referees	Mike Chioda
Referees	Jack Doan
Referees	Mickie Henson
Referees	Chad Patton

Before Taboo Tuesday aired live on pay-per-view, Kerwin White and Matt Striker defeated Shelton Benjamin and Val Venis in a tag team match taped for WWE Heat, one of WWE's secondary television programs.

=== Preliminary matches ===
In the first televised match, Edge and Chris Masters (representing Raw) faced Rey Mysterio and Matt Hardy (representing SmackDown!). Before the match, Edge refused to wrestle, saying he didn't care about representing Raw and chose Snitsky as his replacement. Masters and Snitsky quickly gained the early advantage in the match, as they took the upper hand over Mysterio. Mysterio fought back with a tilt-a-whirl, a counterattack hold. Afterwards, Hardy and Snitsky were tagged in, leading to Hardy getting the advantage as he delivered a Side Effect and DDT on Snitsky. Back and forth action took place between both teams. The match ended when Mysterio performed the 619 on Masters, before Hardy performed the Twist of Fate on Snitsky. Mysterio pinned Masters to give SmackDown! the win over Raw.

In the next match, Rob Conway and Tyson Tomko faced Eugene and Jimmy "Superfly" Snuka, who won the fans' vote with 43%. Conway and Tomko dominated Eugene in the early start of the match. Eugene, however, fought back, avoiding Tomko's attacks. Eugene tagged Snuka in and performed a series of chops to Conway's chest and headbutted him in the process. In retaliation, Tomko attacked Snuka from behind, but Eugene fought him off, as he clotheslined Snuka, Eugene performed a jawbreaker on Conway, which proceeded with Eugene delivering a Rock Bottom to Conway which led to Snuka performing his signature Superfly Splash for the win. After the match, Tomko attacked Snuka and Eugene until Jim Duggan and Kamala came down and fought off Tomko.

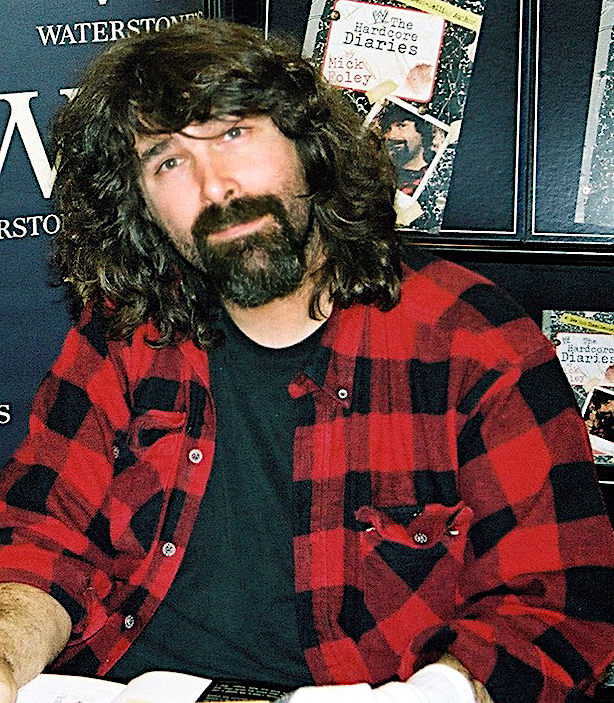
Mick Foley, as Mankind, faced Carlito

In the third match, Carlito faced Mankind, who was chosen by the fans' vote with 52%. The match began when Carlito performed a dropkick on Mankind. However, Mankind got the advantage over Carlito. Midway through the match, Mankind tried to use a steel chair on Carlito, but Carlito avoided, executing a drop toe-hold, sending Mankind into the steel steps. Mankind rose to his feet, which led Carlito to perform a standing dropkick, resulting in Mankind to hit the back of his head into the steel steps. Back in the ring, Mankind received the upper hand after delivering a DDT and forced Carlito to submit with the Mandible claw and win the match.

The voting results for John Cena and Kurt Angle's opponent for the WWE Championship were then revealed, with Shawn Michaels winning. Big Show and Kane, who were also contenders for the WWE title match, faced the World Tag Team Champions Lance Cade and Trevor Murdoch for the World Tag Team Championship. The match began with Big Show and Kane dominating Cade and Murdoch early on. Cade and Murdoch fought back after Murdoch shoved Kane off the top turnbuckle. They performed a running chop block combination on Kane and taking the upper hand. The Big Show, who was tagged in, stood at 7 feet 0 inches (2.13 m) and weighed 500 pounds (230 kg), used his body size to his advantage as he squashed, or easily and quickly performed moves on, Cade and Murdoch. The match concluded after Big Show and Kane delivered a Double Chokeslam and Big Show pinned Cade to win the title with Kane. After the match, Big Show and Kane double teamed Murdoch, as they performed a chokeslam.

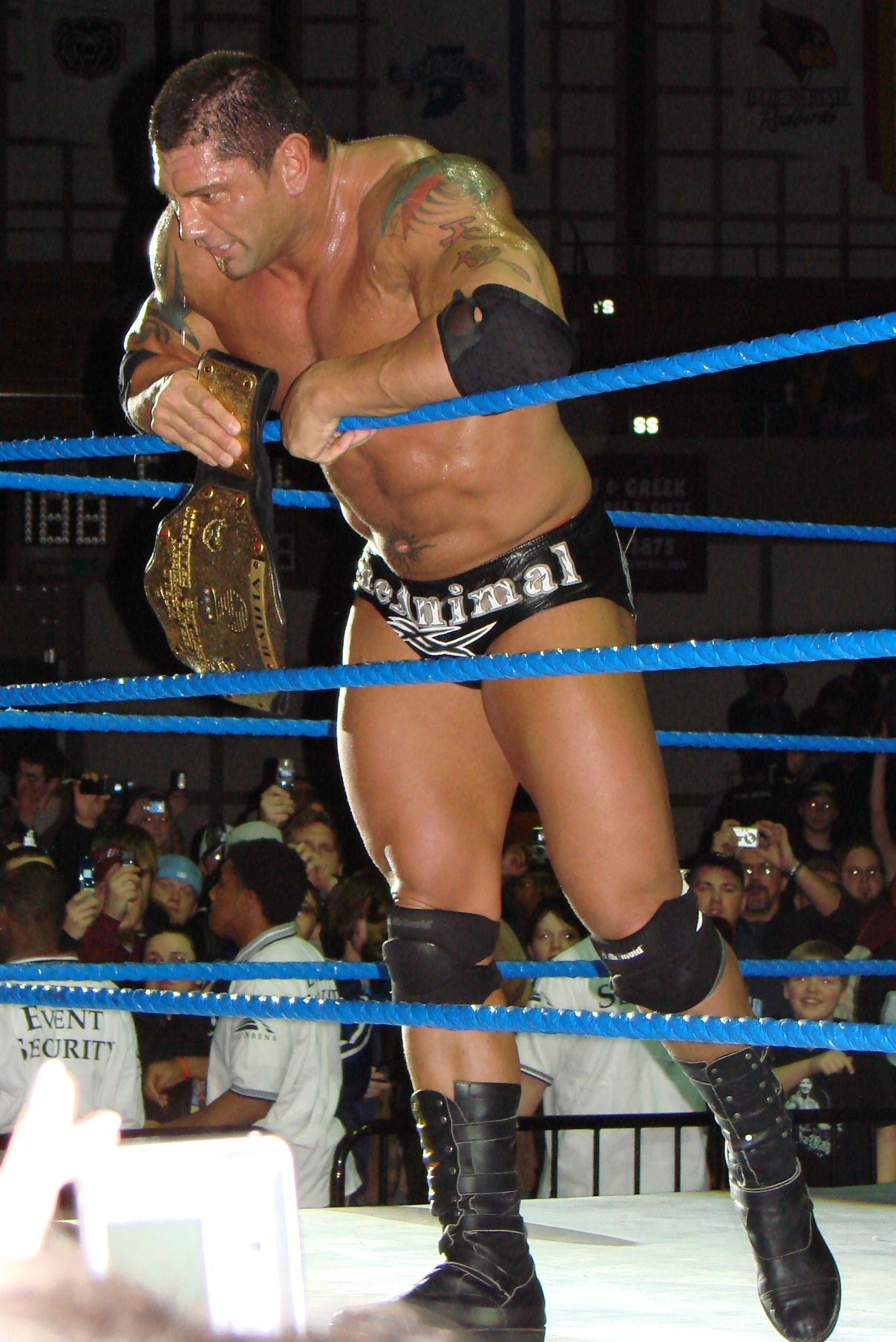
Batista faced Jonathan Coachman at Taboo Tuesday

In the next match Jonathan Coachman (with Goldust and Vader) faced Batista in a Street Fight. In the start of the match, Batista fought both Goldust and Vader, where they proceeded to beat him down in the corner. However, Batista fought back with a series of Spears. Coachman, who stood on the outside, entered the ring, but didn't last long, as Batista clotheslined him. Batista attempted to suplex Vader but Goldust managed to hit Batista with a kendo stick, allowing Coachman to receive the advantage over Batista. The match concluded after Batista performed a Batista Bomb on Coachman to gain the win.

The sixth match was a Battle Royal, a multi-competitor match type in which wrestlers are eliminated until one is left and declared the winner, for the WWE Women's Championship between Ashley, Candice Michelle, Mickie James, Victoria, Maria and Trish Stratus, all of whom wore lingerie, which was voted by the fans' with 43%. In the match, James, as part of a storyline angle involving her being a devoted fan of Stratus, saved Stratus from being eliminated from the match, after Victoria tried eliminating her. Maria was tossed over the top rope by Stratus and James, thus being the first to be eliminated. Afterward, Michelle applied a submission move on Ashley on the top rope. Michelle turned around and was knocked off the ring apron by Ashley, making the second elimination of the match. Following the elimination of Michelle, Ashley was then eliminated by Victoria. The match concluded after Victoria hesitantly tried to eliminate Stratus, but James stopped her from doing so. James eliminated herself along with Victoria to allow Stratus to win and retain her Women's title.

=== Main event matches ===
In the seventh match, Ric Flair defended the WWE Intercontinental Championship against Triple H inside a Steel Cage, which gained 83% of the vote. During the match, Triple H sent Flair head-first into the steel cage, bloodying Flair's from the head. At one point, Triple H retrieved a steel chain, wrapped it around his fist and attempted a diving fist drop from the top turnbuckle. However, Flair countered, raising his foot to Triple H's face and performed a series of knife edged chops. Triple H controlled most of the match, until he attempted to apply the figure four leglock, a signature move of Flair's, resulting in Flair sending him towards the steel cage. After that, Flair bit Triple H's head, bloodying him from his forehead; This often results when a wrestler is trapped, either in a corner of the ring or in a submission hold, as a desperation move. The match ended when Flair reversed a Pedigree with a back body drop and hit Triple H with a steel chair three times, allowing Flair to escape through the steel cage door to win the match and retain his Intercontinental title.

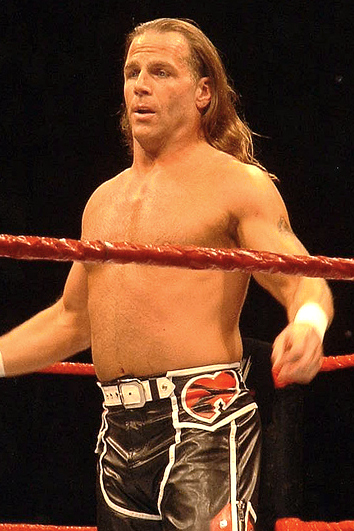
Shawn Michaels was voted to be part of the Triple Threat match for the WWE Championship

In the main event, John Cena defended the WWE Championship against Kurt Angle and Shawn Michaels, who received the fans' vote to be part of the Triple Threat match. Early in the match, Cena performed a back body drop on Angle, sending him outside. Michaels, who was thrown out of the ring, received the upper hand over Cena until Angle returned to the mat, performing a variety of suplexes on both Michaels and Cena. Mid-way in the match, Angle and Michaels double teamed Cena, lifting him in the air, crashing face-first on the Spanish announce table. Back in the ring, Angle Angle Slammed Michaels from the top turnbuckles. Angle then tried to apply the ankle lock on Michaels, but Cena entered the ring, clotheslining Angle out of the ring. Cena proceeded and back body dropped Michaels, attempting to perform a Five Knuckle Shuffle but Kurt Angle pulled Cena out of the ring, tossing him over the security barricade. Toward the end, Angle caught Cena in the ankle lock. Michaels, who was on the outside, delivered a Diving Elbow Drop, on Angle and performed Sweet Chin Music on him. After that, Cena executed the FU on Michaels and pinned him to retain the title.

== Reception ==
The iPayOne Center usually can accommodate 14,000, but the capacity was reduced for the event. It also received 174,000 pay-per-view buys, which was the same amount as the previous year's Taboo Tuesday. The promotion's revenue was $18.8 million, which was greater than the previous year's revenue of $18.5 million. Canadian Online Explorer's professional wrestling section rated the event 7 out of 10 stars. The rating was higher than last year's event in 2004, which was rated 5 out of 10 stars. The WWE title match was rated an 8 out of 10. Additionally, the Divas match was rated a 3 out of 10.

The event was released on DVD on November 29, 2005. The DVD was distributed by the label Sony Music Entertainment.

== Aftermath ==
Following Taboo Tuesday, the storyline between John Cena and Kurt Angle continued. A match was scheduled in which Cena would defend WWE Championship against Angle at November's pay-per-view event Survivor Series. In the scripted feud, Angle refused to compete in the November 7 episode of Raw due to the "you suck" chants from the audience. Angle finally agreed to compete that night when Eric Bischoff censored the crowd and let him have a special guest referee for his title rematch against Cena; Angle chose Daivari to be the guest referee. Before their scheduled rematch, Daivari's officiating was unfair and biased towards Angle's opponents. At Survivor Series, Cena went on to defeat Angle to retain his title.

The storyline angle between Triple H and Ric Flair also continued at Survivor Series, where they were scheduled in a Last Man Standing match. Triple H defeated Flair at Survivor Series after Flair was unable to respond to a ten count. The feud between the Raw and SmackDown! brands continued with Eric Bischoff and Theodore Long deciding on a 5-on-5 elimination match and a singles match between the two at Survivor Series. The teams feuded on both programs. At Survivor Series, Team SmackDown! (Batista, Rey Mysterio, JBL, Bobby Lashley, and Randy Orton) defeated Team Raw (Shawn Michaels, Kane, The Big Show, Carlito, and Chris Masters) and Long defeated Bischoff.

The following year, the interactive PPV was moved to the more traditional Sunday night for pay-per-views. It was in turn renamed to Cyber Sunday.

== Results ==
No.	Results	Stipulations	Times
1^{H}	Kerwin White and Matt Striker (with Nick Nemeth) defeated Shelton Benjamin and Val Venis	Tag team match	02:38
2	Rey Mysterio and Matt Hardy defeated Snitsky and Chris Masters	Tag team match	13:44
3	Eugene and Jimmy Snuka defeated Rob Conway and Tyson Tomko	Tag team match	06:13
4	Mankind defeated Carlito	Singles match	07:22
5	Big Show and Kane defeated Lance Cade and Trevor Murdoch (c)	Tag team match for the World Tag Team Championship	07:59
6	Batista defeated Jonathan Coachman (with Goldust and Vader)	Street Fight	04:12
7	Trish Stratus (c) won by last eliminating Victoria	Fulfill Your Fantasy Battle Royal for the WWE Women's Championship	05:28
8	Ric Flair (c) defeated Triple H	Steel Cage match for the WWE Intercontinental Championship	23:46
9	John Cena (c) defeated Kurt Angle and Shawn Michaels	Triple threat match for the WWE Championship	16:42
(c) / – the champion(s) heading into the match; H / – the match was broadcast prior to the pay-per-view on Sunday Night Heat

=== Battle royal entrances and eliminations ===
Order	Wrestler	Eliminated by
1	Maria Kanellis	Trish Stratus and Mickie James
2	Candice Michelle	Ashley
3	Ashley	Victoria
4	Victoria	Mickie James
5	Mickie James	Victoria
Winner	Trish Stratus	-

=== Voting results ===
Poll	Results
Opponents for Snitsky and Chris Masters	Matt Hardy (31%); Rey Mysterio (29%); John "Bradshaw" Layfield (17%); Christian (13%); Hardcore Holly (10%)
Eugene's partner against Rob Conway and Tyson Tomko	Jimmy Snuka (43%); Jim Duggan (40%); Kamala (17%)
Opponent for Carlito (all options were faces of Mick Foley)	Mankind (52%); Cactus Jack (35%); Dude Love (13%)
Stipulations for Batista versus Jonathan Coachman	Street Fight (91%); Verbal debate (6%); Arm wrestling match (3%)
Outfit for the Fulfill Your Fantasy Diva Battle Royal	Lingerie (43%); Leather and lace (32%); Cheerleader (25%)
Stipulations for Triple H versus Ric Flair	Steel cage match (83%); Submission match (13%); Regular match (promoted as one fall to a finish) (4%)
Opponent for John Cena and Kurt Angle	Shawn Michaels (46%); Kane (38%); Big Show (16%)
