= Rated-RKO =

Professional wrestling tag team

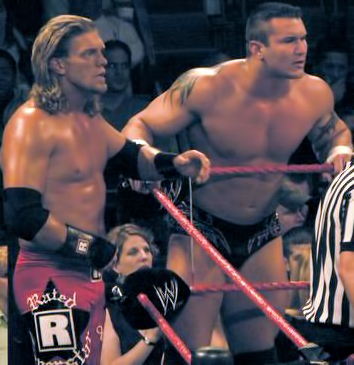
- Edge and Orton in 2006

Tag team
- Members: Edge; Randy Orton; Lita (valet)
- Name(s): Edge and Randy Orton; Rated-RKO
- Combined billed weight: 496 pounds (225 kg)
- Debut: October 9, 2006
- Disbanded: May 11, 2007

Rated-RKO was a tag team in World Wrestling Entertainment (WWE) consisting of Edge and Randy Orton. Active on the Raw brand between October 2006 and May 2007, the alliance was formed primarily to feud with D-Generation X (DX). During their tenure, the duo captured the World Tag Team Championship once. Edge's girlfriend, Lita, also managed the team until her departure from WWE in November 2006. Following their disbandment, Edge and Orton occasionally reunited throughout the following years.

== History ==
=== Feud with D-Generation X (2006–2007) ===
On the October 2, 2006, episode of Raw, Edge failed to win the WWE Championship from John Cena due to interference from DX. The following week, Edge, alongside Lita, convinced Orton to join forces against DX, citing Orton's bitter storyline history with Triple H. At Cyber Sunday in November, Edge and Orton defeated DX with the help of Eric Bischoff, who served as the special guest referee.

The following night on Raw, Edge and Orton challenged Ric Flair and Roddy Piper for the World Tag Team Championship. Although Bischoff reprised his role as guest referee, Edge and Orton lost the match following interference from DX. A week later, however, the duo captured the championship after attacking Piper, effectively taking him out of the match, and became officially known as Rated-RKO. Later that month at Survivor Series, Team Rated-RKO suffered a clean-sweep defeat against Team DX in a 5-on-5 elimination match. At the same event, Lita wrestled her final WWE match before departing the company, losing the Women's Championship to Mickie James.

The rivalry between the two teams escalated on Raw when Rated-RKO attacked Flair to provoke DX. This culminated in a World Tag Team Championship match at New Year's Revolution in January 2007, which ended in a no contest, and Triple H suffered a torn right quadriceps. With Triple H sidelined for several months, Rated-RKO continued their feud with Michaels, losing to him in a 2-on-1 handicap match on Raw. At the Royal Rumble, both Edge and Orton reached the final four of the titular match, but were eliminated by Michaels. The following night on Raw, Rated-RKO's title reign ended when they lost the championship to the impromptu duo of Michaels and Cena.

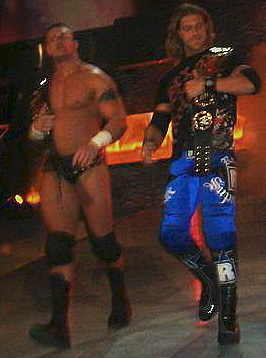
Edge and Randy Orton as World Tag Team Champions

On the February 15 episode of Raw, Rated-RKO, Mr. Kennedy and MVP lost to John Cena, Shawn Michaels, The Undertaker and Batista. Internal dissension continued as both men laid claim to being the number one contender to the WWE Championship, and Edge walked out on Orton on the February 26 episode of Raw during a rematch for the World Tag Team Championship due to miscommunication.

The relationship strained further after both men qualified for the WrestleMania 23 Money in the Bank ladder match, which would grant the winner a championship match. For weeks Edge influenced various authority figures into putting Orton in matches that would cause Orton not to succeed.

=== Breakup and subsequent reunions (2007–2011) ===
On the April 16, 2007 episode of Raw, they reunited to take on John Cena in a handicap match but lost the match due to interference from Michaels. At Backlash, the two were involved in a Fatal Four-Way match for the WWE Championship along with Michaels and Cena. Cena ended up retaining the title after pinning Orton. On the April 30 episode of Raw, Edge and Orton met in a one-on-one match. Edge won the match by pinning Orton following a spear. Edge then moved to the SmackDown! brand on the May 11 episode of SmackDown!, after cashing in the Money in the Bank briefcase (which he had won from Mr. Kennedy on the May 7 episode of Raw) to win the World Heavyweight Championship from The Undertaker. With this move, Rated-RKO was officially disbanded. During Raw's 15th Anniversary episode on December 10, Rated-RKO reunited for "one night only" to partake in a six-man tag team match, teaming up with Umaga to face the members of Orton's former group Evolution (Triple H, Batista, and Ric Flair). They lost the match after being disqualified.

The team had a reunion on the April 21, 2008 episode of Raw, when Orton and Edge teamed with John "Bradshaw" Layfield (JBL) and Chavo Guerrero Jr. to take on John Cena, Triple H, The Undertaker, and Kane in a winning effort.

On the April 26, 2010, episode of Raw, Edge cost Orton (who had turned face after feuding with his former group The Legacy) a number-one contender's match by spearing him during a triple threat match against Batista and Sheamus. Orton and Edge faced off at Over the Limit in May, though Orton dislocated his right shoulder and the match concluded with a double countout.

On the January 28, 2011 episode of SmackDown, Edge and Orton reunited as fan favourites in a winning effort against Dolph Ziggler and The Miz. On the February 18 episode of SmackDown, they reunited once again and teamed up with John Morrison, R-Truth, Rey Mysterio Jr., and John Cena to defeat Kane, Ziggler, Sheamus, CM Punk, Drew McIntyre, and Wade Barrett in a 12-man tag team match. On the April 11 episode of Raw, Edge announced his retirement due to a neck injury preventing him from being medically cleared.

=== Feud (2020–2021) ===
Edge returned to wrestling at the Royal Rumble event in January 2020. The following night on Raw, he was attacked by Orton, beginning a feud. They would face each other in a Last Man Standing match at WrestleMania 36, which was won by Edge and a singles match at Backlash, which was won by Orton.

The next year, at Royal Rumble, they participated in the Royal Rumble match as the first two entrants. Both would last until the final two where Edge eliminated Orton to win the match. Edge defeated Orton on the February 1 episode of Raw to end their year-long feud. Two years later, Edge would depart from WWE in 2023 and signed with All Elite Wrestling under his real name of Adam Copeland.

== Championships and accomplishments ==
- World Wrestling Entertainment
  - World Tag Team Championship (1 time)
