= Backlash (2007) =

World Wrestling Entertainment pay-per-view event

- Promotional poster featuring Edge, parodying the movie The Shining
- Promotion: World Wrestling Entertainment
- Brand(s): Raw; SmackDown! ECW
- Date: April 29, 2007
- City: Atlanta, Georgia
- Venue: Philips Arena
- Attendance: 14,500
- Buy rate: 210,000

Pay-per-view chronology
← Previous; WrestleMania 23	Next → Judgment Day

Backlash chronology
← Previous; 2006	Next → 2008

The 2007 Backlash was a professional wrestling pay-per-view (PPV) event produced by World Wrestling Entertainment (WWE). It was the ninth annual Backlash and took place on April 29, 2007, at the Philips Arena in Atlanta, Georgia, held for wrestlers from the promotion's Raw, SmackDown!, and ECW brand divisions. The concept of the event was based around the backlash from WrestleMania 23.

This was WWE's first monthly PPV held during the first brand split period to feature all three brands after the company discontinued brand-exclusive PPVs. This made it the first Backlash since 2003 to feature multiple brands. It was also the first Backlash to feature ECW which was introduced as a third brand in May 2006.

The main match on the Raw brand was a fatal four-way match for the WWE Championship involving champion John Cena, Randy Orton, Edge, and Shawn Michaels. Cena won the match and retained the championship after pinning Orton. The primary match on the SmackDown! brand was a Last Man Standing match for the World Heavyweight Championship between The Undertaker and Batista, which ended in a no-contest after both men failed get to their feet before the referee counted to 10. The featured match on the ECW brand was Bobby Lashley versus Team McMahon (Umaga, Vince McMahon, and Shane McMahon) in a handicap match for the ECW World Championship. Vince won the title and the match for his team after pinning Lashley.

== Production ==
=== Background ===
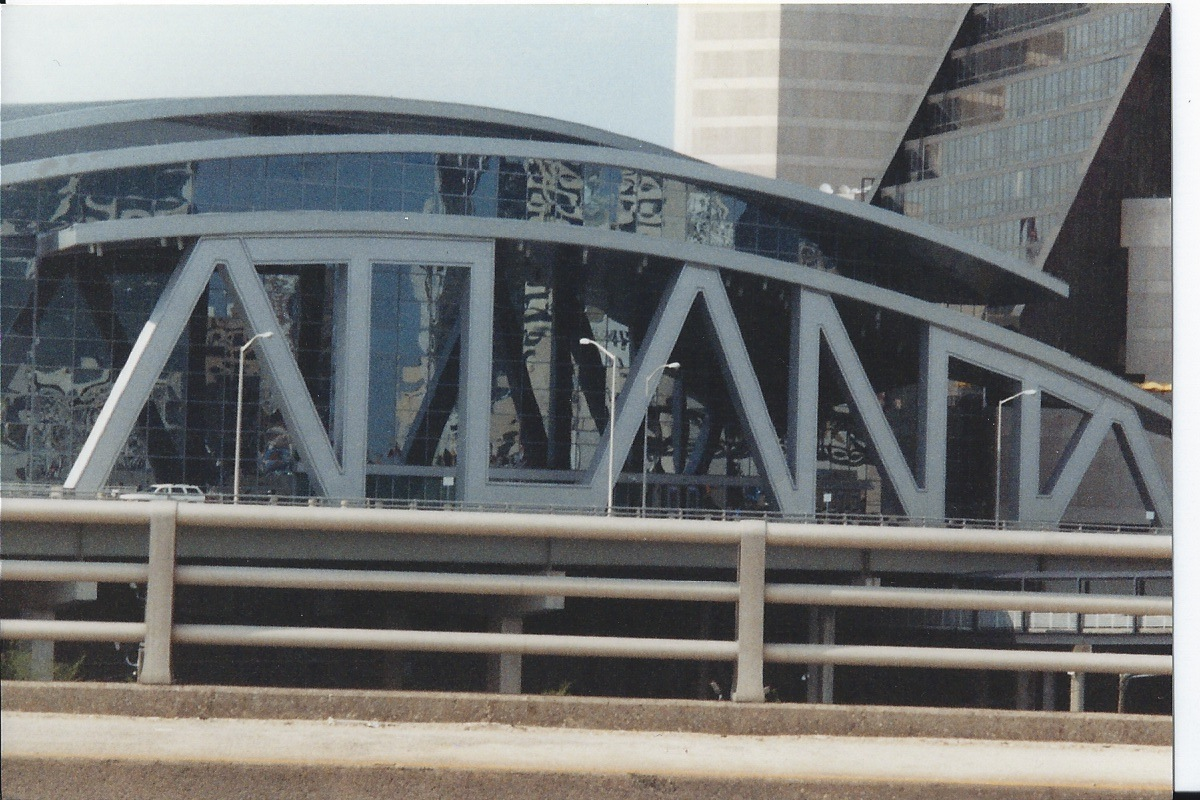
The ninth annual Backlash was held at the Philips Arena in Atlanta, Georgia.

Backlash is a professional wrestling pay-per-view (PPV) event that was established by World Wrestling Entertainment (WWE) in 1999. The concept is based around the backlash from WWE's flagship event, WrestleMania. The ninth event featured the backlash from WrestleMania 23 and it was scheduled to take place on April 29, 2007, at the Philips Arena in Atlanta, Georgia. From 2004 to 2006, Backlash was held exclusively for wrestlers from the Raw brand, but following WrestleMania 23, WWE discontinued brand-exclusive PPVs. The 2007 Backlash was the first PPV held following this change and thus featured wrestlers from Raw, SmackDown!, and ECW, making this the first Backlash since 2003 to feature multiple brands and the first Backlash to feature ECW, which was introduced as a third brand in May 2006.

=== Storylines ===
The main event scripted into Backlash on the Raw brand was a fatal four-way match for the WWE Championship, a standard match involving four wrestlers between John Cena, Edge, Shawn Michaels, and Randy Orton. At the Royal Rumble in January, Michaels was one of the final two participants in the Royal Rumble match before being eliminated by The Undertaker. On the February 5 episode of Raw, Michaels earned the right to become the number-one contender for the WWE Championship at WrestleMania 23 after defeating Orton and Edge in a triple threat match. At WrestleMania, Cena defeated Michaels to retain the WWE Championship after forcing Michaels to submit to the STFU. On the April 9 episode of Raw, a number one contender's match between Michaels and Orton for the WWE Championship ended in a no contest after both men's shoulders were on the mat while they were pinning one another. Later that night, during Edge's talk show, "The Cutting Edge", Edge claimed that Raw General Manager Jonathan Coachman had named him the number-one contender to the WWE title. Honorary General Manager Michael Pena, from the Make-a-Wish Foundation, however, announced that Michaels, Orton, and Edge would face Cena for the title at Backlash in a fatal four-way match.

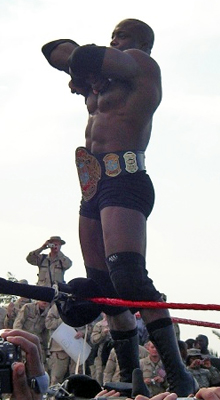
Bobby Lashley during his first reign as ECW Champion.

The main rivalry on the SmackDown! brand was between The Undertaker and Batista over the World Heavyweight Championship. At the Royal Rumble, The Undertaker won the 2007 Royal Rumble match. As a result, he was given the right to a world title match at WrestleMania for any of WWE's three major championships (ECW World, World Heavyweight, or WWE) at WrestleMania 23. On the February 5 episode of Raw, The Undertaker teased all three respective World Champions (Bobby Lashley, Batista, and John Cena) before choosing Batista as his opponent to face at WrestleMania. At WrestleMania, The Undertaker defeated Batista to win the World Heavyweight Championship to extend his WrestleMania undefeated streak to 15–0. Their rivalry, however, did not end, as SmackDown! General Manager Theodore Long booked a Last Man Standing match between The Undertaker and Batista at Backlash.

The main rivalry on the ECW brand was between Bobby Lashley and Team McMahon (Umaga, Vince McMahon, and Shane McMahon), in which Lashley and Vince were feuding over the ECW World Championship. The rivalry started on the February 26 episode of Raw, when Lashley was selected by Donald Trump to compete at WrestleMania 23. Lashley was selected to compete against Vince's representative, Umaga, in Hair vs. Hair match, a match in which the loser's representative would have to get his head shaved bald. At WrestleMania, Lashley defeated Umaga, and after the match, Trump and Lashley shaved Vince's head bald. On the April 9 episode of Raw, Shane challenged Lashley to a Hair vs. Title match for the ECW World Championship. Shane got himself intentionally disqualified, but did not get his head shaved. After the match, Umaga and Vince and Shane attacked Lashley. After the beating, Vince announced that Lashley would have to defend the ECW World Championship against Team McMahon at Backlash in a three-on-one handicap match.

== Event ==
=== Preliminary matches ===
Other on-screen personnel
Role:	Name:
English commentators	Jim Ross (Raw)
English commentators	Jerry Lawler (Raw)
English commentators	Michael Cole (SmackDown!)
English commentators	John "Bradshaw" Layfield (SmackDown!)
English commentators	Joey Styles (ECW)
English commentators	Tazz (ECW)
Spanish commentators	Carlos Cabrera
Spanish commentators	Hugo Savinovich
Interviewers	Todd Grisham
Interviewers	Maria Kanellis
Ring announcers	Justin Roberts (Raw/ECW)
Ring announcers	Tony Chimel (SmackDown!)
Referees	Mike Chioda (Raw)
Referees	Chad Patton (Raw)
Referees	Jim Korderas (SmackDown!)
Referees	Mickie Henson (SmackDown!)
Referees	Marty Elias (Raw)
Referees	Jack Doan (Raw)
Referees	Scott Armstrong (ECW)

Before the event aired live on pay-per-view, Carlito defeated Johnny Nitro in a dark match. The first match of the event was The Hardys (Matt Hardy and Jeff Hardy) versus Lance Cade and Trevor Murdoch for the World Tag Team Championship. Cade and Murdoch controlled a majority of the match; however, The Hardys won the bout when Matt pinned Murdoch after a Twist Of Fate, which was followed by Jeff's Swanton Bomb.

The match that followed was Melina versus Mickie James for the WWE Women's Championship. The match was short lived, as Melina performed an Inverted DDT on Mickie James and pinned her to retain the WWE Women's Championship.

The third match was between Chris Benoit and Montel Vontavious Porter for the WWE United States Championship. Benoit and MVP struggled throughout the match, attempting to gain the upper hand. In the end, Benoit pinned MVP with a small package to retain the WWE United States Championship.

=== Main event matches ===
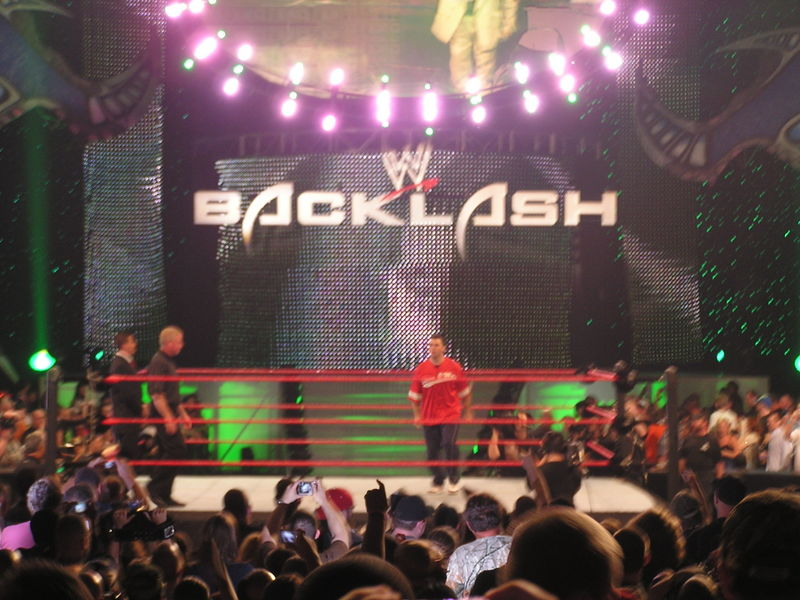
Shane McMahon in the ring before his match at Backlash.

The three-on-one handicap ECW World Championship match between champion Bobby Lashley and Team McMahon (Umaga, Vince McMahon, and Shane McMahon) was next. Shane struck Lashley with the ECW World Championship belt and Umaga executed a diving splash on Lashley. Umaga then tagged in Vince, who scored a near-fall. Vince then tagged in Umaga, who executed a second diving splash on Lashley. After being tagged in again, Vince pinned Lashley to win the ECW World Championship and the match for his team.

The next match was The Undertaker against Batista in a Last Man Standing Match for the World Heavyweight Championship. At one spot, The Undertaker executed a leg drop through an announce table on Batista. Towards the end, the two fought up the entrance ramp, where Batista executed a spear to The Undertaker off the stage. Neither man could get to their feet before the referee's count of ten; in result, the match ended in a draw. Due to WWE regulations, titles can't change hands in a Last Man Standing match by a draw, so The Undertaker remained champion.

The main event was John Cena against Edge, Randy Orton, and Shawn Michaels in a fatal four-way match for the WWE Championship. During the match, Michaels performed a moonsault onto Cena, Edge, and Orton on the floor. Edge performed a spear on Orton. Cena then performed an FU to Edge. Michaels executed Sweet Chin Music on Cena, who fell on Orton for the pinfall victory, retaining the title.

== Aftermath ==
Lance Cade and Trevor Murdoch continued their rivalry with The Hardys until the two teams had a rematch at Judgment Day for the World Tag Team Championship, which The Hardys won.

Chris Benoit and Montel Vontavious Porter also continued their rivalry for the WWE United States Championship, which led to a two out of three falls match at Judgment Day, which MVP won.

On the May 11 episode of SmackDown!, The Undertaker defended the World Heavyweight Championship against Batista in a Steel Cage match. Both men escaped the steel cage at the same time, and The Undertaker was therefore declared still the champion. After the match, Mark Henry returned and attacked The Undertaker. Edge, who defeated Mr. Kennedy on the May 7 episode of Raw to win the Money in the Bank contract, cashed in his opportunity and defeated The Undertaker to win the World Heavyweight Championship.

Team McMahon's feud with Bobby Lashley continued as Mr. McMahon gave Lashley a rematch at Judgment Day, which was another three-on-one Handicap match for the ECW World Championship. At Judgment Day, Lashley won the match, but Vince said that Lashley had not beaten him, as Lashley had pinned Shane instead, so Lashley was not awarded the belt. The rivalry continued until One Night Stand, where Lashley challenged Vince to a street fight. Lashley won the match and the ECW World Championship, and their rivalry ended.

== Results ==
No.	Results	Stipulations	Times
1^{D}	Carlito defeated Johnny Nitro by pinfall	Singles match	—
2	The Hardys (Jeff Hardy and Matt Hardy) (c) defeated Lance Cade and Trevor Murdoch by pinfall	Tag team match for the World Tag Team Championship	14:18
3	Melina (c) defeated Mickie James by pinfall	Singles match for the WWE Women's Championship	09:02
4	Chris Benoit (c) defeated Montel Vontavious Porter by pinfall	Singles match for the WWE United States Championship	13:10
5	Mr. McMahon, Shane McMahon, and Umaga defeated Bobby Lashley (c) by pinfall	Handicap match for the ECW World Championship (Note: Vince won the title due to pinning Lashley.)	15:45
6	The Undertaker (c) vs. Batista ended in a draw	Last Man Standing match for the World Heavyweight Championship	21:23
7	John Cena (c) defeated Edge, Randy Orton and Shawn Michaels by pinfall	Fatal four-way match for the WWE Championship	21:21
(c) / – the champion(s) heading into the match; D / – this was a dark match
