= Astrada =

Notable people with the surname include:

- Carlos Astrada (1894–1970), Argentine philosopher
- Julio Astrada (1844–1923), Argentine politician, governor of the province of Córdoba
- Leonardo Astrada (born 1970), retired Argentine footballer
- Mauro Astrada, (born 1980), Argentine former footballer

== See also ==
- Estrada
