= Backlash (2006) =

World Wrestling Entertainment pay-per-view event

- Promotional poster featuring Triple H
- Promotion: World Wrestling Entertainment
- Brand: Raw
- Date: April 30, 2006
- City: Lexington, Kentucky
- Venue: Rupp Arena
- Attendance: 14,000
- Buy rate: 273,000
- Tagline: Long Live The King

Pay-per-view chronology
← Previous; WrestleMania 22	Next → Judgment Day

Backlash chronology
← Previous; 2005	Next → 2007

The 2006 Backlash was a professional wrestling pay-per-view (PPV) event produced by World Wrestling Entertainment (WWE). It was the eighth annual Backlash and took place on April 30, 2006, at the Rupp Arena in Lexington, Kentucky, held exclusively for wrestlers from the promotion's Raw brand division. The concept of the event was based around the backlash from WrestleMania 22.

This was the last Backlash to be brand-exclusive during the first brand split period (2002–2011), as following WrestleMania 23 in April 2007, brand-exclusive PPVs were discontinued. It would also be the last Raw-exclusive Backlash as after brand-exclusive PPVs returned during the second brand split period that began in 2016, Backlash became SmackDown-exclusive until brand-exclusive PPVs were again discontinued after WrestleMania 34 in April 2018.

Seven professional wrestling matches were scheduled on the event's card, which saw three main matches. The first of these main events was a triple threat match for the WWE Championship, which saw John Cena defeat challengers Triple H and Edge to retain his title. The second main event was Shawn Michaels and "God" versus Vince McMahon and Shane McMahon in a No Holds Barred match, which was won by the McMahons. The third main event was a Winner Takes All "Title vs. Briefcase match" that pitted Mr. Money in the Bank Rob Van Dam against Intercontinental Champion Shelton Benjamin, with Van Dam defending his Money in the Bank briefcase, containing a contract for a guaranteed world championship match at any time, and Benjamin defending his championship. Van Dam defeated Benjamin, thus retaining his Money in the Bank briefcase and winning the Intercontinental Championship.

The event received 273,000 pay-per-view buys, which was more than the previous year's event received. This contributed to WWE's pay-per-view revenue increasing by US$4.3 million from the previous year. When the event was released on DVD, it peaked at second on Billboard's DVD sales chart for recreational sports.

== Production ==
=== Background ===
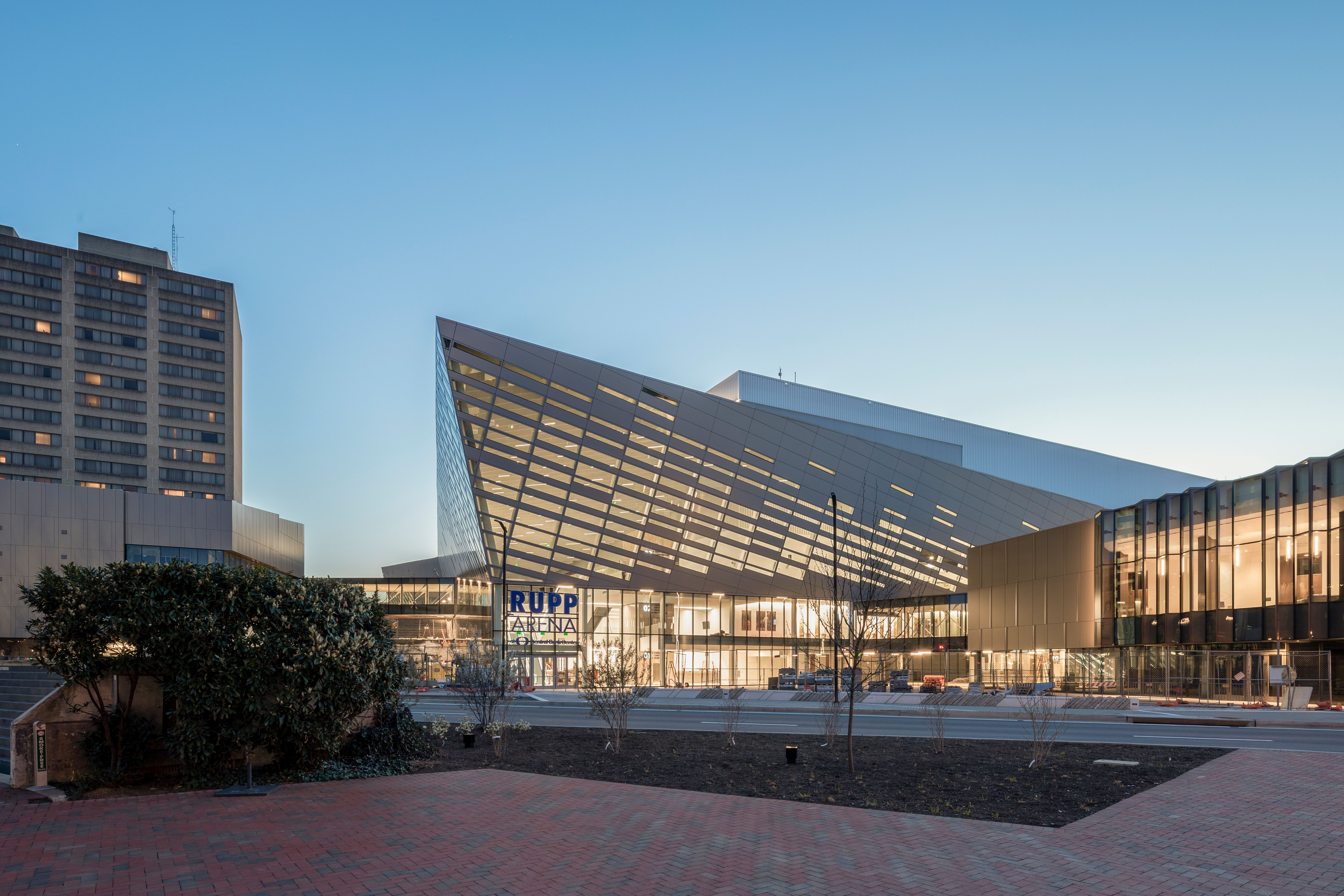
The eighth Backlash was held at the Rupp Arena in Lexington, Kentucky.

Backlash is a professional wrestling pay-per-view (PPV) event that was established by World Wrestling Entertainment (WWE) in 1999. The concept is based around the backlash from WWE's flagship event, WrestleMania. The eighth event featured the backlash from WrestleMania 22 and was scheduled to take place on April 30, 2006, at the Rupp Arena in Lexington, Kentucky. This returned Backlash to the April slot after the 2005 event was held in May. Like the previous two years, the 2006 event exclusively featured wrestlers from the Raw brand division.

=== Storylines ===
Backlash featured matches that involved different wrestlers from pre-existing feuds, plots, and storylines. of events that built tension, and culminated into a wrestling match or series of matches. All wrestlers were from WWE's Raw brand.

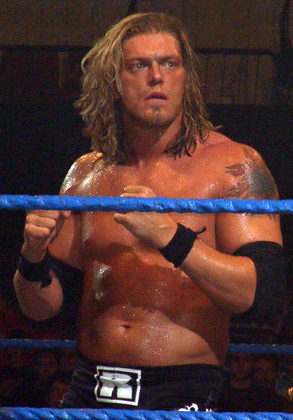
Edge, who competed in the triple threat match for the WWE Championship.

The main event was a triple threat match for the WWE Championship between John Cena, Triple H, and Edge. The buildup to the match began when Triple H lost the Royal Rumble match, but participated in the 2006 Road to WrestleMania Tournament, where the winner would become the number-one contender to the WWE Championship at WrestleMania 22. Triple H won the tournament. Cena defeated Triple H at WrestleMania to retain the title after forcing him to submit to the STFU. The next night on Raw, Triple H demanded another shot at the WWE Championship, but Edge and Lita interrupted Triple H's segment. Edge said that he became WWE Champion at New Year's Revolution when he cashed in his Money in the Bank title shot, that he won at WrestleMania 21, and defeating Cena at the event, after Cena had defeated five other men in an Elimination Chamber match. Cena, however, reclaimed the WWE Championship at the 2006 Royal Rumble, when he defeated Edge. Edge claimed that it was time for a new opponent for the WWE Championship, after stating that at WrestleMania, Triple H lost his opportunity when he lost to Cena. All three men had a series of handicap matches leading up to Backlash with Triple H pinning Cena after a Pedigree, Cena forcing Edge to submit to the STFU, and Edge pinning Triple H after a Spear on Triple H. It was then announced that Cena would defend the WWE Championship in a Triple Threat match against Triple H and Edge at Backlash.

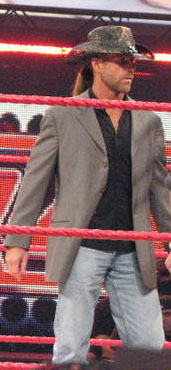
Shawn Michaels, who faced Vince McMahon and Shane McMahon in a Handicap match.

Another rivalry heading into the event was Vince McMahon and Shane McMahon versus Shawn Michaels and God. This feud started on the December 26, 2005 episode of Raw, when Vince McMahon made note of Bret Hart's DVD, claiming that he "tricked" Hart in the hours of his match at Survivor Series 1997, where Hart lost the WWE Championship to Shawn Michaels. At the event, Michaels applied Hart's own finisher, the Sharpshooter, and McMahon called for the bell, in an event known as the "Montreal Screwjob". Michaels interrupted McMahon and told him to "let it go" and "move on" from the events of Survivor Series. In reply McMahon told Michaels that he indeed screwed Bret Hart and added, "Shawn, do not make me screw you." At the Royal Rumble, Shane McMahon made a surprising appearance when he eliminated Michaels from the Rumble match, though Shane was not a participant. McMahon informed Michaels that he would face his son Shane on the March 18, 2006 Saturday Night's Main Event XXXII in a No Holds Barred match. At the event, Vince interfered throughout the match on his son's behalf, by stopping the referee's count, after Michaels performed Sweet Chin Music, an enraged Michaels grabbed McMahon but before he could do anything, Shane hit Michaels with a low blow. McMahon ordered Shane to apply the Sharpshooter on Michaels, and, after he executed the submission move, McMahon called for the bell, similar to the 1997 Survivor Series match. Mr. McMahon booked himself and Michaels in a No Holds Barred match at WrestleMania 22. At WrestleMania, the Spirit Squad and Shane McMahon interfered on McMahon's behalf, but Michaels defeated Vince McMahon after he performed Sweet Chin Music and captured the pinfall victory. The next night on Raw, The McMahons confronted Michaels and informed him that his win at WrestleMania was "an act of God", therefore setting up the tag team match at Backlash that would have The McMahons facing Michaels and God.

The Divas rivalry between Mickie James and Trish Stratus over the WWE Women's Championship continued entering the event. Stratus and James first fought over the title at New Year's Revolution, with Stratus retaining. In the months that followed, James' obsession with Stratus grew to the point that she confessed to Stratus that she was in love with her; making Stratus uncomfortable. James made one final attempt to kiss Stratus at Saturday Night's Main Event XXXII on March 18, after the duo defeated Candice Michelle and Victoria. After she was rebuffed, James attacked Stratus and later vowed to destroy her, turning James into a villainess. At WrestleMania 22, the evil James defeated Stratus to capture the Women's Championship for the first time in her career. In the following weeks, James continued her mind games by dressing like Stratus and claiming to be her. Stratus eventually confronted James by dressing like her and mocking her personality. It was later announced that a Women's Championship rematch between James and Stratus would take place at Backlash.

== Event ==
Other on-screen personnel
Role:	Name:
English commentator(s)	Jim Ross
English commentator(s)	Jerry Lawler
Spanish commentator(s)	Carlos Cabrera
Spanish commentator(s)	Hugo Savinovich
Interviewer(s)	Maria Kanellis
Interviewer(s)	Todd Grisham
Ring announcer	Lilian Garcia
Referees	Mike Chioda
Referees	Jack Doan
Referees	Chad Patton
Referees	Marty Elias

Before the event aired live on pay-per-view, Goldust defeated Rob Conway in a match that aired on Heat. Goldust won the match after a powerslam.

In the first match of the actual event, Carlito faced Chris Masters. In the beginning, Carlito had the advantage over Masters, as he performed a splash and Springboard Back elbow on Masters. Masters, however, gained the advantage and executed a Powerbomb. Carlito performed a Back Cracker. Carlito then pinned Masters while using the ropes for leverage to win the match.

Next was a match between Umaga and Ric Flair. Umaga had the advantage throughout the match, as Umaga executed a knee to Flair's head. Umaga defeated Flair after a Samoan Spike.

The third match was between Mickie James and Trish Stratus for the WWE Women's Championship. The match had escalated outside the ring. When Stratus delivered punches to Mickie, who was on the second turnbuckle, Mickie threw her over the top rope, causing Stratus to land on her right arm. Afterwards, Mickie choked Stratus with a wristband she was wearing that fell off during the match, therefore giving the win to Stratus by disqualification, but per WWE regulations, a title can only change hands via pinfall or submission therefore Mickie retained the Championship.

The next match was the winner take all match for the WWE Intercontinental Championship and the Money in the Bank briefcase between Rob Van Dam and Shelton Benjamin. Both Van Dam and Benjamin started the match with high spots as Benjamin performed a Sunset Flip Powerbomb. The match went back and forth with action, but in the end Van Dam performed a Five Star Frog Splash on Benjamin and pinned him to win the match and retain his Money in the Bank briefcase and win the Intercontinental Championship.

In the next match, Big Show faced Kane, which ended in a no contest after a red hue covered the ring and voices from the speakers in the arena began taunting Kane by saying "May 19th". Big Show, who seemed to have enough, hit Kane with a folding chair and walked away.

The sixth match was Vince McMahon and Shane McMahon versus Shawn Michaels and "God" in a No Holds Barred match. As soon as The McMahons made their way to the ring, Vince informed the referee to "check" "God" for any hidden objects, as God was being "portrayed" by the stage spotlight. The match started with Shawn Michaels executing a crossbody on both Vince and Shane McMahon on the outside of the ring. Afterwards, Michaels crossbodied Vince down through a part of the Backlash staging area. Shane then hit Michaels with a folding chair and caused him to bleed. After Vince and Shane took turns assaulting Michaels, Vince grabbed a microphone and informed Michaels that "God" had left the building and used a Superkick against him. Michaels battled back and grabbed two tables and put both Vince and Shane on them. Michaels then grabbed a ladder and stood on top of it. The Spirit Squad (Kenny, Johnny, Mitch, Nicky, and Mikey) interfered and attacked Michaels, which was followed by the Spirit Squad putting Michaels through a table with a Sky lift slam. Vince then pinned Michaels for the win.

The main event was the triple threat match for the WWE Championship between champion John Cena, Edge, and Triple H. As the match began, Edge chose to stand outside the ring, hoping that Cena and Triple H would simply fight the match themselves. Cena and Triple H, however, teamed up and turned against Edge. One spot in the match saw Edge catapult Triple H into the steel ringpost, which made Triple H bleed. Afterwards, Edge executed an Edgecution onto an announce table on Triple H and then focused on Cena. Cena, however, locked Edge in the STFU, but was broken when Triple H hit Cena in the head with a microphone. Triple H then went after Edge and hit him with a chair, sending him over the security wall and into the audience. Lita, who accompanied Edge, entered the ring with a chair to hit Triple H, but Triple H reversed it into a Spinebuster. Near the end of the match, Cena attempted an FU on Edge but Triple H delivered a low blow to Cena, which made Cena drop Edge out of the ring and attempted to execute a Pedigree. Cena, however, countered it into a jackknife roll-up. Cena won the match and successfully retained the WWE Championship. After the match, Triple H hit Cena, Edge, and the referee with a sledgehammer, and performed his signature taunt until performing his signature DX cross chops, receiving a standing ovation from the audience, closing the show.

== Reception ==
The event received 273,000 pay-per-view buys, which was more buys than the previous year's event received, however, the event made $19.9 million in revenue, which was less than the previous year's revenue of $21.6 million.

The event was released on DVD on May 30, 2006, by Sony Music Entertainment and reached second on Billboard's DVD Sales Chart for recreational sports during the week of June 24, 2006.

== Aftermath ==
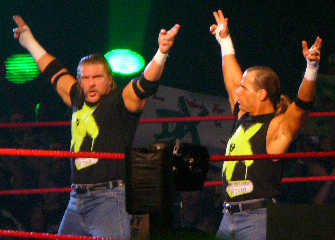
Triple H reunited with Shawn Michaels to reform D-Generation X.

On the May 15 episode of Raw, Rob Van Dam lost the WWE Intercontinental Championship to Shelton Benjamin in a rematch. The following week, after John Cena defeated Chris Masters in a singles match, Rob Van Dam came out and informed Cena that he would be cashing in his Money in the Bank contract, that he won at WrestleMania at ECW One Night Stand. On the May 29 episode of Raw, Van Dam was selected by ECW Representative Paul Heyman to be drafted from Raw to WWE's new ECW brand. At One Night Stand, Cena lost the WWE Championship to Van Dam in an Extreme Rules match.

Following the aftermath from Backlash, Kane was confronted by an Imposter Kane, who was wearing Kane's old mask and ring attire. The Imposter executed a chokeslam on Kane during his match against Shelton Benjamin for the Intercontinental Championship. This rivalry lead to a match between the two at Vengeance, in which the real Kane lost to the Imposter.

The McMahons, along with The Spirit Squad, continued their feud with Shawn Michaels. In the weeks that followed, Michaels would get revenge on both the McMahons and the Spirit Squad. On the May 22 episode of Raw, however, Michaels was in a 5-on-1 handicap match, and the Spirit Squad members, in storyline, injured Michaels' left knee. Triple H, who was included during the rivalry, was ordered by Vince McMahon to "break Michaels' skull", with his signature sledgehammer. Triple H refused to do what Mr. McMahon ordered, turned Face and attacked the Spirit Squad. Weeks followed in which Triple H was supposed to become a member of Mr. McMahon's "Kiss My Ass Club". Triple H, however, backfired when trying to become a member, when he gave a Pedigree to McMahon and laid him and Shane out in the ring. On the June 12 episode of Raw, McMahon booked Triple H in a Handicap Gauntlet match against the Spirit Squad. The match saw Michaels return from his storyline injury, which led to Triple H and Michaels reforming their previous wrestling stable D-Generation X (DX). At Vengeance, DX met the Spirit Squad in a 5-on-2 handicap match, which DX won.

This was the last Backlash event to be brand-exclusive during the first brand split period (2002–2011), as following WrestleMania 23 in April 2007, brand-exclusive PPVs were discontinued. It would also be the last Raw-exclusive Backlash as after brand-exclusive PPVs returned during the second brand split period that began in 2016, Backlash became SmackDown-exclusive until brand-exclusive PPVs were again discontinued after WrestleMania 34 in April 2018.

== Results ==
Match Card
No.	Results	Stipulations	Times
1^{H}	Goldust defeated Rob Conway	Singles match	3:38
2	Carlito defeated Chris Masters	Singles match	9:58
3	Umaga (with Armando Alejandro Estrada) defeated Ric Flair	Singles match	3:29
4	Trish Stratus defeated Mickie James (c) by disqualification	Singles match for the WWE Women's Championship	4:06
5	Rob Van Dam (contract holder) defeated Shelton Benjamin (c)	Winner Takes All match for the WWE Intercontinental Championship and the Money in the Bank contract	18:42
6	Big Show vs. Kane ended in a no contest	Singles match	9:30
7	Mr. McMahon and Shane McMahon defeated Shawn Michaels and "God"	Tag team No Holds Barred match	19:57
8	John Cena (c) defeated Edge (with Lita) and Triple H	Triple threat match for the WWE Championship	17:33
(c) / – the champion(s) heading into the match; H / – the match was broadcast prior to the pay-per-view on Sunday Night Heat
