= Met Bega =

Albanian actor (1946–2015)

- Born: August 7, 1946; Tirana, PR Albania
- Died: April 21, 2015 (aged 68); Tirana, Albania
- Occupation: Actor
- Years active: 1980s–1990s
- Known for: Theater and satire
- Awards: Order of Naim Frashëri (Gold)

Met Bega (7 August 1946 – 21 April 2015) was an Albanian stage and film actor, best known for his comedic roles and appearances in Tirana's variety theater.

== Career ==
He began his artistic career performing on amateur school stages and later became a member of the Estrada (variety theatre) in Tirana. He frequently appeared in comedy skits and varieté performances, often performing in a duo with actress Marjana Kondi. He made his film debut in 1986 with a minor role in the feature film "Dy herë mat". He also appeared in five Albanian featured films, often in character or supporting roles.

In addition to his stage and film work, Bega also appeared in the satirical television program "Tirana TV". In 2010, he was awarded the "Golden Order of Naim Frashëri" in recognition of his contributions to Albanian art and culture.

== Selected filmography ==
- Dy herë mat (1986) – Turisti
- Tela për violinë (1987) – Lamja
- Stolat në park (1988) – as Edlira’s relative
- Edhe kështu, edhe ashtu (1989) – as father of eight children
- Çanta e zezë (1996)
