= Estrada =

- Language: Spanish, Galician, Portuguese

Origin
- Language: Latin
- Origin: Spain, Portugal
- Meaning: “Paved way” or “Road”

Estrada is a Spanish surname of Galician and Portuguese origin, derived from the word “estrada” meaning road, and also a term for a paved way in Latin. The name is prevalent across Spain and Latin America, and especially in Mexico and among Hispanics in the United States.

== Notable people with the surname include ==
- Aaron Estrada (born 2001), American basketball player
- Adelaide Estrada (1898 – 1979) Portuguese medical doctor and researcher
- Alain Estrada (born 1991), Mexican footballer
- Alan Estrada (born 1980), Mexican actor, dancer and singer
- Ana Estrada (1976–2024), Peruvian psychologist and euthanasia activist
- Angelina Estrada (1932–2005), American actress, known for Ghost
- Armando Estrada (born 1976), born Hazem Ali, professional wrestler
- Armando Estrada (basketball) (born 1930), Cuban basketball player
- Arturo Estrada Hernández (born 1925), Mexican painter
- Blanca Estrada (born 1950), Spanish actress and TV presenter
- Carla Estrada (born 1956), Mexican producer
- Catalina Estrada (born 1998), Costa Rican footballer
- Chuck Estrada (born 1938), American former Major League Baseball player
- Cindy Estrada, American trade union leader
- Daniel Estrada (politician) (1947–2003), Peruvian lawyer and politician
- Daniel Estrada (boxer) (born 1985), Mexican boxer
- Daniel Estrada (athlete) (born 1990), Chilean long-distance runner
- David Estrada (boxer) (born 1978), Guatemalan/Mexican-American professional boxer
- David Estrada (soccer) (born 1988), American soccer player
- Eden Estrada, Mexican-American model and social media influencer
- Elise Estrada (born 1987), Filipino-Canadian singer
- Enrique Estrada (1890–1942), Mexican General and politician
- Erik Estrada, American actor, Reserve police officer
- Gary Estrada (born 1971), born Gary Jason Bocaling Ejercito, Filipino actor and politician, nephew of Joseph Estrada
- Genaro Estrada (1887–1937), Mexican statesman and writer
- Gilberto Owen Estrada (1904–1952), Mexican poet and diplomat
- Horacio Estrada, Venezuelan former Major League Baseball player
- Ignacio Estrada (1946–2024), American ventriloquist
- Jade Esteban Estrada, American actor
- Jeremiah Estrada (born 1998), American Major League Baseball player
- Jinggoy Estrada (born 1963), born Jose Pimentel Ejercito Jr., Filipino politician and actor, son of Joseph Estrada
- John Estrada, Filipino model and actor
- John L. Estrada, USMC, Sergeant Major of the Marine Corps
- Johnny Estrada, American former Major League Baseball player
- José Estrada Sr. (born 1946), Puerto Rican professional wrestler
- José Estrada Jr. (born 1973), Puerto Rican professional wrestler, son of José Estrada Sr.
- José Estrada (director) (1938–1986), Mexican film director
- José Estrada González (born 1967), Cuban baseball player and Olympic gold medalist
- Joseph Estrada (born 1937), born Jose M. Ejercito, Filipino politician and actor, former President of the Philippines
- Juan Alberto Estrada, Argentine football goalkeeper
- Juan José Estrada, former President of Nicaragua
- Juan José Estrada (boxer) (1963–2015), Mexican boxer
- Julio Estrada (composer) (born 1943), Mexican composer, musicologist and theoretician
- Julio Estrada (wrestler) (born 1970), known as Rico Suave, Puerto Rican professional wrestler and manager
- Julio Estrada (footballer) (born 1977), Mexican football manager and former footballer
- Julio Héctor Estrada (born 1974), Guatemalan politician
- Kaila Estrada, Filipina actress
- Karla Estrada, Filipina actress and television host
- Kiko Estrada (born 1992), born Jason Joseph Francis Carlos Diaz Ejercito, Filipino actor, grand-nephew of Joseph Estrada
- Lázaro Estrada (born 1999), Cuban Major League Baseball player
- Lena Estrada (born c. 1982), Colombian politician
- Lizardo Estrada Herrera (born 1973), Peruvian Roman Catholic archbishop
- Manuel Octavio Bermúdez Estrada (1961–2024), Colombian serial killer
- Marco René Estrada (born 1983), Mexican-American Major League Baseball player
- Marco Estrada, Chilean footballer
- María Estrada (c. 1475 or 1486 – between 1537–48), woman who accompanied Cortés in his expedition to Mexico
- Mario Lopez Estrada, Guatemalan billionaire businessman
- Miguel Estrada (born 1961), unsuccessful nominee to the US Court of Appeals for the District of Columbia Circuit
- Miriam Estrada-Castillo, international law professor
- Natalia Estrada, Spanish model, actress & TV presenter
- Noel Estrada, Puerto Rican composer
- Oscar Estrada, Cuban former Major League Baseball player
- Pipi Estrada (born 1957), born José Manuel Estrada, Spanish sports journalist and TV panelist
- Rafael Estrada ( ? – ? ), Mexican film actor
- Ric Estrada (1928–2009), Cuban-American comics artist
- Roy Estrada (1943–2025), American bassist and convicted child abuser
- Seniesa Estrada (born 1992), American former professional boxer
- Silvana Estrada (born, 1997), Mexican musician and songwriter
- Susana Estrada (born 1950), Spanish actress, vedette, and singer
- Tania Estrada (born 1995), Mexican television host, model and beauty pageant winner
- Thairo Estrada (born 1996), Venezuelan Major League Baseball player
- Tomás Estrada Palma, Cuban politician
- Tomás Estrada (footballer), Spanish footballer
- Walter Estrada, Colombian professional boxer
- Walter Estrada Degrandi (1930–2007), Uruguayan chess master

== See also ==
- Astrada
- A Estrada, a municipality in Pontevedra province, Galicia, Spain
- Estrada, a performing arts genre
