= Royal Rumble (2007) =

World Wrestling Entertainment pay-per-view event

- Promotional poster featuring various WWE wrestlers
- Promotion: World Wrestling Entertainment
- Brand(s): Raw; SmackDown! ECW
- Date: January 28, 2007
- City: San Antonio, Texas
- Venue: AT&T Center
- Attendance: 13,500
- Buy rate: 525,000

Pay-per-view chronology
← Previous; New Year's Revolution	Next → No Way Out

Royal Rumble chronology
← Previous; 2006	Next → 2008

The 2007 Royal Rumble was a professional wrestling pay-per-view (PPV) event produced by World Wrestling Entertainment (WWE), held for wrestlers from the promotion's Raw, SmackDown!, and ECW brand divisions. It was the 20th annual Royal Rumble event and took place on January 28, 2007, at the AT&T Center in San Antonio, Texas, This was the second Royal Rumble held in San Antonio, after the 1997 event at the Alamodome, and it was the first to feature the ECW brand, which became WWE's third brand in May 2006.

The event was based around the men's Royal Rumble match, a modified 30-man battle royal in which the participants enter at timed intervals instead of all beginning in the ring at the same time and the winner received a world championship match at WrestleMania. For the 2007 event, the winner received their choice to challenge for either Raw's WWE Championship, SmackDown!'s World Heavyweight Championship, or the ECW World Championship at WrestleMania 23. This was the first time the ECW World Championship was an option, subsequently being the first time that there were three options.

Five professional wrestling matches were featured on the event's supercard, a scheduling of more than one main event. The main event was the 2007 Royal Rumble match, which featured wrestlers from all three brands. SmackDown!'s The Undertaker, the 30th entrant, won the match by last eliminating Raw's Shawn Michaels, the 23rd entrant. The primary match on the Raw brand was a Last Man Standing match for the WWE Championship between John Cena and Umaga. Cena won the match and retained the title after Umaga was unable to get to his feet before the referee counted to 10. The predominant match on the SmackDown! brand was Batista versus Mr. Kennedy for the World Heavyweight Championship, which Batista won by pinfall. The featured match on the ECW brand was between Bobby Lashley and Test for the ECW World Championship, which Lashley won after Test was counted out.

== Production ==
=== Background ===
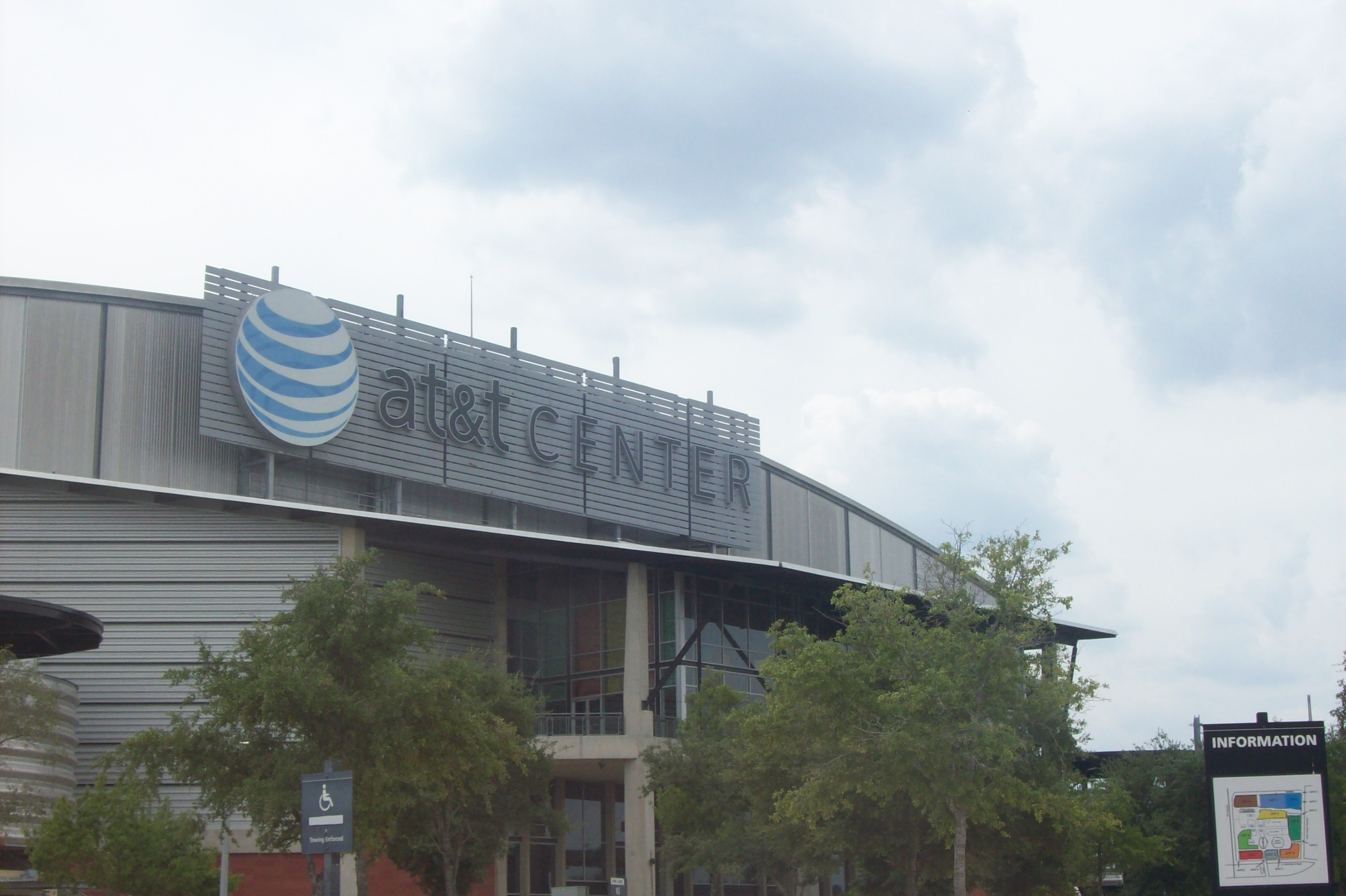
The 20th annual Royal Rumble event was held at the AT&T Center in San Antonio, Texas, which was the event's second time in San Antonio after the 1997 event at the Alamodome.

The Royal Rumble is an annual professional wrestling event, produced every January by World Wrestling Entertainment (WWE) since 1988; that first event was a television special before it became an annual pay-per-view (PPV) beginning in 1989. It is one of the promotion's original four pay-per-views, along with WrestleMania, SummerSlam, and Survivor Series, referred to as the "Big Four". It is named after and centered on the men's Royal Rumble match.

The 20th Royal Rumble event was scheduled to be held on January 28, 2007, at the AT&T Center in San Antonio, Texas. This marked the second Royal Rumble held in San Antonio after the 1997 event, which was held at the Alamodome. It featured wrestlers from the Raw, SmackDown!, and ECW brands, which was the first Royal Rumble to include ECW, a relaunch of the former Extreme Championship Wrestling (ECW) promotion that became WWE's third brand in May 2006.

The Royal Rumble match is a modified battle royal in which the participants enter at timed intervals instead of all beginning in the ring at the same time, and the match generally features 30 wrestlers. Since 1993, the winner earns a world championship match at that year's WrestleMania. For 2007, the winner could choose to challenge for either Raw's WWE Championship, SmackDown!'s World Heavyweight Championship, or the ECW World Championship at WrestleMania 23. This marked the first time that the ECW World Championship was a choice for the winner of the match, subsequently marking the first time that the winner had a choice between three world championships.

=== Storylines ===
The event comprised six matches, as well as one dark match, that resulted from scripted storylines. Results were predetermined by WWE's writers on the Raw, SmackDown, and ECW brands, while storylines were produced on WWE's weekly television shows, Raw, SmackDown, and ECW.

The main feud heading into the Royal Rumble on Raw was between WWE Champion John Cena and Umaga. At the previous pay-per-view event, New Year's Revolution, Cena defeated Umaga to end his undefeated streak and retain the WWE Championship. The night after on Raw, Armando Alejandro Estrada, Umaga's manager, asked for a rematch, which Cena agreed to. Later that night, during a match between Cena and The Great Khali, Umaga interfered and attacked Cena. The following week, the official contract signing for their rematch at the Royal Rumble took place. After it was announced that Estrada could choose the match type, Estrada chose the match to be a Last Man Standing match. Cena signed the contract and proceeded to attack both Umaga and Estrada. On the January 22 episode of Raw, after Cena was eliminated from a Battle Royal, Umaga attacked Cena, and injured his spleen, which was portrayed as real as part of their storyline.

The predominant feud on the SmackDown! brand was between Batista and Mr. Kennedy, with the two battling over the World Heavyweight Championship. On the January 5 episode of SmackDown! a Beat the Clock Sprint began. Wrestlers competed in singles matches, and the wrestler to win a match in the shortest amount of time would then become the number one contender to the World Heavyweight Championship at the Royal Rumble. Mr. Kennedy, who defeated Chris Benoit in nearly five minutes, had the shortest time at the show's end. The following week, the Sprint continued. In the final match, between The Undertaker and The Miz, Kennedy interfered by pulling The Miz out of the ring. After performing the Tombstone piledriver on The Miz, The Undertaker went for the pin attempt. Time, however, ran out and Kennedy became the winner of the Sprint. The following week after on SmackDown!, The Undertaker was put in a match with Kennedy, where if he won, he would be added to the title match at the Royal Rumble. During the match, after Kennedy attacked Batista, who was at ringside. Batista retaliated against Kennedy, causing The Undertaker to get disqualified. Thus, the match at the Royal Rumble remained a singles match between Batista and Kennedy.

The main feud on the ECW brand was between Bobby Lashley and Test, with the two feuding over the ECW Championship. Rob Van Dam won an online poll against Test and Sabu to earn a title shot on the January 2 episode of ECW, which ended in no-contest. Van Dam was given another title match the next week. Test interfered in the match, and attacked both men. A triple threat match for the title occurred on the January 16 episode of ECW between Lashley, Van Dam, and Test. Lashley won, but was beaten down afterward by Test. A title match between Lashley and Test was then made for the Royal Rumble. A week after that match was made, on the January 23 episode of ECW, Lashley defeated Test in another title match.

== Event ==
Other on-screen personnel
Role:	Name:
English commentators	Jim Ross (Raw)
English commentators	Jerry Lawler (Raw / Royal Rumble)
English commentators	Michael Cole (SmackDown! / Royal Rumble)
English commentators	John "Bradshaw" Layfield (SmackDown! / Royal Rumble)
English commentators	Joey Styles (ECW)
English commentators	Tazz (ECW)
Spanish commentators	Carlos Cabrera
Spanish commentators	Hugo Savinovich
Interviewer	Todd Grisham
Ring announcer	Lilian Garcia (Raw / Royal Rumble match)
Ring announcer	Tony Chimel (SmackDown!)
Ring announcer	Justin Roberts (ECW)
Referees	Mike Chioda (Raw)
Referees	Jack Doan (Raw)
Referees	Chris Kay (SmackDown!)
Referees	Jim Korderas (SmackDown!)
Referees	Nick Patrick (SmackDown!)
Referees	Charles Robinson (SmackDown!)
Referees	Scott Armstrong (ECW)
Referees	Mickie Henson (ECW)
Bingo machine tumbler	Kelly Kelly (ECW)

Before the event went live on pay-per-view, JTG defeated Lance Cade in a dark match.

=== Preliminary match ===
The first match that aired was a tag team match between The Hardys (Matt and Jeff Hardy) and MNM (Joey Mercury and Johnny Nitro). The match went back and forth until MNM took control by attacking Matt's injured jaw repeatedly. The Hardys gained the advantage briefly but lost it when Nitro countered an aerial attack by Jeff. Jeff finally tagged Matt, who beat down both Mercury and Nitro. The finish came when Matt delivered a Twist of Fate and Jeff performed the Swanton Bomb on Nitro. Jeff then pinned Nitro for the victory.

=== Main matches ===
The second match was Bobby Lashley against Test for the ECW World Championship. Test used many illegal moves, and took control after driving Lashley's shoulder into the ring post. He continued to attack the shoulder until Lashley fought back with several powerful moves. Test rolled out of the ring, allowing himself to be counted out. Lashley won and retained his title. He came after Test, however, brought him back into the ring, and continued to beat him down.

The third match was Batista defending the World Heavyweight Championship against Mr. Kennedy. Batista gained an early advantage by overpowering Kennedy until Kennedy injured Batista's knee by using the steel steps. Kennedy continued to attack Batista's knees and applied various submission holds that targeted the knee. Batista fought back, still favoring the knee, until Kennedy pushed Batista into the referee and hit a low blow. Kennedy had Batista pinned for over a three-count, but the match went on due to the referee being knocked out. Kennedy brought the referee conscious but Batista performed a lariat and a Batista Bomb to retain the title.

In the fourth match, John Cena defended the WWE Championship against Umaga in a Last Man Standing match. Umaga dominated Cena, gaining the advantage by using powerful moves and attacking Cena's bandaged ribs. Cena tried to fight back using the steel steps, but Umaga quickly recovered, and continued the beat down. Cena managed to hit a low blow and delivered a bulldog onto the steel steps, a spin-out powerbomb onto the steel steps, and the Five Knuckle Shuffle all onto Umaga. Umaga regained control when Cena attempted an FU onto the steps, and collapsed, hitting his head on the steps. Cena avoided a running headbutt drop and hit Umaga in the head with a television monitor. Umaga stood but missed a running splash through a broadcast table. Umaga got up again as his manager, Armando Alejandro Estrada, detached one of the turnbuckles for Umaga to use. Cena avoided the attack, executed an FU, and applied the STF on Umaga using the loose ring rope. Umaga failed to answer the referee's count of ten, and Cena retained the title.

=== Main event match ===
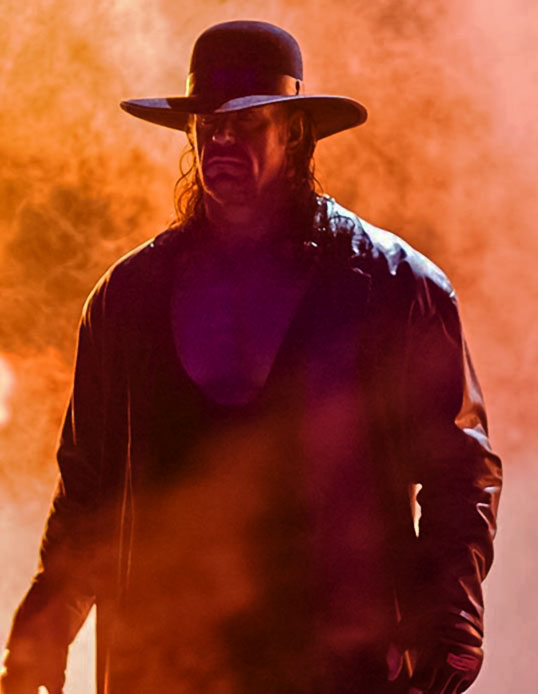
The Undertaker, who won the 2007 Royal Rumble match.

The final match was the Royal Rumble match. Kane, the tenth entrant, dominated the match upon entering, eliminating Tommy Dreamer and Sabu, by chokeslamming Sabu through a table Sabu had earlier set up. The Sandman, entering fifteen, used his signature Singapore Cane in the match before King Booker quickly eliminated him. Randy Orton and Edge worked together to eliminate the Hardys. After Booker was eliminated by Kane, he returned to the ring, eliminated Kane, and continued to beat him down. It took the combined effort of nine men to eliminate Viscera after Shawn Michaels performed a superkick on Viscera. The Great Khali, entering twenty-eighth, dominated upon entering the match, eliminating seven men quickly. The Undertaker entered last, who immediately fought with, and eliminated Khali, then Montel Vontavious Porter, leaving Edge, Orton, Michaels, and Undertaker as the final four. Orton executed an RKO on Michaels, causing him to roll out of the ring under the ropes and leaving Edge, Orton, and the Undertaker. Orton caught Edge trying to attack him, but the two soon reconciled, working together on The Undertaker. Michaels, outside the ring, came back in, eliminating both Orton and Edge. The remaining two exchanged attacks until the end when The Undertaker chokeslammed Michaels, who retaliated with Sweet Chin Music. Michaels attempted another Sweet Chin Music but Undertaker avoided it, then eliminated Michaels to win the match. The Undertaker became the first competitor to win the Rumble match from #30 (what is considered to be the "easiest" spot to win from, despite no one having done so in any previous match).

== Reception ==
The AT&T Center has hosted many different events that have a variety of seating maximums. A basketball event, which has a smaller set-up than a wrestling event, can hold a maximum of 18,797 fans. Due to the Royal Rumble's production, the maximum standard was lowered and the event drew 13,500 fans and received 491,000 pay-per-view buys. WWE made $15.8 million from pay-per-view revenues in their first quarter (which included the Royal Rumble, No Way Out, and WrestleMania) versus $17.1 million in 2006 for the same events, a $1.3 million difference. The 2006 Royal Rumble also resulted in 548,000 pay-per-view buys, 57,000 more than the 2007 Royal Rumble. Canadian Online Explorer's professional wrestling sub website, Slam! Wrestling, rated the entire event 7.5 out of 10 points, in which they also rated the Royal Rumble match a 7.5 out of 10 points. The last man standing match between John Cena and Umaga was widely praised. The Royal Rumble 2007 was released on DVD on February 27, 2007 and was distributed by WWE Home Video. The DVD debuted on Billboard's Top DVD sales chart at #3 on March 24, 2007. The DVD remained on the chart for 13 consecutive weeks until June 16, 2007 when its final rank was at #10.

== Aftermath ==
The shows following the Royal Rumble surrounded The Undertaker's choice of which champion to face at WrestleMania 23. The Undertaker appeared on all three brands and stared down the champions. Finally, on the February 5 episode of Raw, The Undertaker chose to face Batista for the World Heavyweight Championship, and hit him with a chokeslam, starting their rivalry. The Undertaker won the title at WrestleMania, improving his WrestleMania record to 15-0, and their feud continued until the May 11 episode of SmackDown!, when The Undertaker lost the title to Edge, who cashed in the Money in the Bank, that he won from Mr. Kennedy, earlier that week on Raw.

After The Undertaker made his choice on February 5, Shawn Michaels, Edge, and Randy Orton all wanted to face Cena for his title at WrestleMania. A triple threat match was made between the three for the title shot, which Michaels won after pinning Orton. Cena successfully retained his title against Michaels at WrestleMania. They continued to feud over the title with the addition of Orton and Edge, but Cena remained champion. Soon after the Royal Rumble, Umaga and Bobby Lashley joined the feud between Mr. McMahon and Donald Trump in the "Battle of the Billionaires" as their representatives respectively for the Hair vs. Hair match at WrestleMania.

His Royal Rumble match marked the start of Mr. Kennedy's push to main-event status. He went on to face Bobby Lashley for the ECW World Championship at No Way Out, which he won via disqualification, thus failing to win the title. Kennedy won the Money in the Bank ladder match at WrestleMania, which gave him a world title shot at any time of his choosing for the year following. Kennedy sustained an injury at a house show, however, that would leave him sidelined for five to seven months, and was booked to lose his title shot to Edge on the May 7 episode of Raw. Later results showed the injury to be much less severe, but Kennedy had already lost his title shot. He returned to mid-card status for the remainder of the year.

This was the final Royal Rumble to be in 4:3 format before all WWE programs switched to high definition in January 2008.

== Results ==
No.	Results	Stipulations	Times
1^{D}	JTG (with Shad Gaspard) defeated Lance Cade (with Trevor Murdoch) by pinfall	Singles match	—
2	The Hardys (Matt Hardy and Jeff Hardy) defeated MNM (Joey Mercury and Johnny Nitro) (with Melina) by pinfall	Tag team match	15:27
3	Bobby Lashley (c) defeated Test by countout	Singles match for the ECW World Championship	7:18
4	Batista (c) defeated Mr. Kennedy by pinfall	Singles match for the World Heavyweight Championship	10:29
5	John Cena (c) defeated Umaga (with Armando Alejandro Estrada)	Last Man Standing match for the WWE Championship	23:12
6	The Undertaker won by last eliminating Shawn Michaels	30-man Royal Rumble match for a world championship match at WrestleMania 23	56:18
(c) / – the champion(s) heading into the match; D / – this was a dark match

=== Royal Rumble entrances and eliminations ===
– Raw
– SmackDown!
– ECW
– Winner

Draw	Entrant	Brand	Order of elimination	Eliminated by	Time	Eliminations
1	Ric Flair	Raw	1	Edge	05:40	0
2	Finlay	SmackDown!	12	Shawn Michaels	32:32	0
3	Kenny Dykstra	Raw	2	Edge	04:05	0
4	Matt Hardy	SmackDown!	9	Randy Orton	18:55	0
5	Edge	Raw	28	Shawn Michaels	44:02	5
6	Tommy Dreamer	ECW	3	Kane	06:41	0
7	Sabu	ECW	4	Kane	05:27	0
8	Gregory Helms	SmackDown!	5	King Booker	06:50	0
9	Shelton Benjamin	Raw	14	Shawn Michaels	22:22	1
10	Kane^{1}	SmackDown!	11	King Booker^{4}	13:21	3
11	CM Punk	ECW	22	The Great Khali	27:16	1
12	King Booker	SmackDown!	10	Kane	09:23	3
13	Super Crazy	Raw	7	Edge and Randy Orton	04:32	0
14	Jeff Hardy	Raw	8	Edge	03:38	0
15	The Sandman	ECW	6	King Booker	00:13	0
16	Randy Orton	Raw	27	Shawn Michaels	27:14	2
17	Chris Benoit	SmackDown!	19	The Great Khali	17:52	3
18	Rob Van Dam	ECW	21	The Great Khali	16:30	2
19	Viscera	Raw	13	Chris Benoit, CM Punk, Edge, Hardcore Holly, Johnny Nitro, Kevin Thorn, Rob Van Dam, Shawn Michaels, and Shelton Benjamin ^{2}	06:22	0
20	Johnny Nitro	Raw	15	Chris Benoit	06:18	1
21	Kevin Thorn	ECW	16	Chris Benoit	06:15	1
22	Hardcore Holly	ECW	18	The Great Khali	10:21	1
23	Shawn Michaels	Raw	29	The Undertaker	24:11	5
24	Chris Masters	Raw	17	Rob Van Dam	03:32	0
25	Chavo Guerrero	SmackDown!	24	The Great Khali	06:24	0
26	Montel Vontavious Porter	SmackDown!	26	The Undertaker	07:31	0
27	Carlito	Raw	23	The Great Khali	03:19	0
28	The Great Khali	Raw	25	The Undertaker	03:45	7
29	The Miz	SmackDown!	20	The Great Khali	00:07	0
30	The Undertaker	SmackDown!	—	Winner^{3}	13:15	3

1. Glenn Jacobs (Kane) made his eleventh appearance in a Royal Rumble match, breaking his own and Solofa Fatu (Rikishi)'s record for most Royal Rumble appearances. It was also his ninth-consecutive appearance, also billed as a record for Kane.
2. This Royal Rumble set a new record for the most wrestlers involved in an elimination, taking 9 men to throw [[Viscera] (wrestler)|Viscera]] over the top rope. This beat the previous record set in the 1994 Royal Rumble when it took 7 men to eliminate Viscera (then known as Mabel).
3. The Undertaker was the first wrestler to win the Royal Rumble match at number 30.
4. King Booker was eliminated, but came back in and eliminated Kane.
