= Umaga (wrestler) =

American professional wrestler (1973–2009)

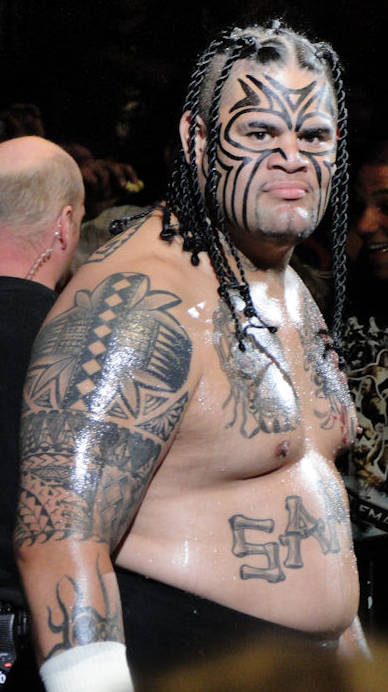
- Umaga in 2009

Personal information
- Born: Edward Smith Fatu; March 28, 1973 American Samoa
- Died: December 4, 2009 (aged 36) Houston, Texas, U.S.
- Cause of death: Heart attack
- Spouse: L.T. Fatu (m. 2001)
- Children: 4, including Zilla Fatu
- Family: Anoaʻi

Professional wrestling career
- Ring name(s): Armageddon 1 Eddie Fatu; Ekmo; Ekmo Fatu; Jamal; Uso Fatu; Umaga
- Billed height: 6 ft 4 in (193 cm)
- Billed weight: 350 lb (159 kg)
- Billed from: "The Isle of Samoa"
- Trained by: Afa Anoaʻi
- Debut: 1995

Edward Smith Fatu (March 28, 1973 – December 4, 2009) was an American professional wrestler. He was best known for his tenure in World Wrestling Entertainment (WWE), under the ring name Umaga. Fatu was also known for his tenure in All Japan Pro Wrestling in the mid-2000s, under the ring name Jamal.

He was a member of the Anoaʻi family, a renowned Samoan wrestling family. During his first stint with WWE billed as Jamal, he was part of tag team 3-Minute Warning, with his cousin Matt Anoaʻi, billed as Rosey. He was released from the company in June 2003, later going to All Japan Pro Wrestling (AJPW) and becoming a mainstay for the company from late 2003 to 2005. In April 2006, Fatu returned to WWE under the ring name Umaga. Fatu went undefeated on the Raw brand throughout the year before finally suffering his first defeat in January 2007 at the hands of then WWE Champion John Cena. The following month, he won the WWE Intercontinental Championship for the first time, and won it for the second time in July 2007. He also appeared in the "Battle of the Billionaires" WrestleMania 23 match as Vince McMahon's representative. He was released by WWE in June 2009 and wrestled on the independent circuit until his death in December of that year.

== Early life ==
Edward Smith Fatu was born in American Samoa on March 28, 1973, to Vera and Solofa Fatu. He was a member of the Anoaʻi family. His mother was the sister of Afa and Sika of The Wild Samoans. He has two older brothers who are also professional wrestlers: Sam (The Tonga Kid) and Solofa Jr. (Rikishi). He was also the uncle of Jacob Fatu, Jonathan (Jimmy Uso) and Joshua Fatu (Jey Uso), and Joseph Fatu (Solo Sikoa), as well as a cousin of several professional wrestlers, including Rodney Anoaʻi (Yokozuna), Matt Anoaʻi (Rosey) and Joe Anoaʻi (Roman Reigns). Fatu grew up in Samoa and played football in high school.

== Professional wrestling career ==
=== Early career (1995–2001) ===
Fatu trained with his cousin Matt Anoaʻi at the Wild Samoan professional wrestling school operated by members of their family. In 1995, with his training complete, Fatu debuted in his uncle Afa's World Xtreme Wrestling (WXW) promotion. From 1999 to 2000, he worked for Frontier Martial-Arts Wrestling in Japan.

=== World Wrestling Federation/Entertainment (2001–2003) ===
In 2001, Fatu, along with his cousin Matt, signed developmental contracts with the World Wrestling Federation (WWF), and were assigned to Heartland Wrestling Association (HWA), adopting the tag team name the Island Boyz, and with Fatu using the ring name Ekmo. They won the HWA Tag Team Championship in November by defeating Evan Karagias and Shannon Moore. They also competed for Memphis Championship Wrestling (MCW), holding the MCW Southern Tag Team Championship on three occasions.

Fatu (renamed to Jamal) and Anoaʻi (renamed to Rosey) made their main roster debut on the July 22, 2002, episode of Raw as 3-Minute Warning, a pair of villainous thugs. They were hired as enforcers of Eric Bischoff, attacking random wrestlers each week, after Bischoff either gave people three minutes to entertain him before they were attacked or decided that three minutes of a segment was enough before the team appeared to end it. They attacked numerous wrestlers at the orders of Bischoff, including D'Lo Brown and Shawn Stasiak. They also attacked non-wrestlers, including ring announcer Lilian Garcia and former wrestlers Jimmy Snuka, Mae Young and The Fabulous Moolah. Their most notable event came when they attacked two lesbians on the September 9 episode of Raw.

3-Minute Warning then began a feud with Billy and Chuck, interfering in their storyline commitment ceremony, and defeating them on September 22 at the Unforgiven pay-per-view event. Rico, Billy and Chuck's former manager, also began to manage 3-Minute Warning during this time. On November 17 at Survivor Series, they competed in an elimination tables match, which was won by The Dudley Boyz (Bubba Ray Dudley and D-Von Dudley). The team lasted just shy of a year, with Fatu being released from his WWE contract in June 2003, reportedly after his involvement in a bar fight.

=== Total Nonstop Action Wrestling (2003–2004) ===
On September 10, 2003, Fatu debuted in Total Nonstop Action Wrestling (TNA) under the ring name of Ekmo Fatu, helping Sonny Siaki defeat D'Lo Brown in a casket match. He then formed a tag team with Siaki. From October to August 2004, he teamed with Sonny Siaki to defeat the teams of Shark Boy and Mad Mikey, Danny Doring and Roadkill, and America's Most Wanted. Fatu made his final appearance on August 11, 2004, where he lost to Alex Shelley.

=== All Japan Pro Wrestling (2003–2005) ===
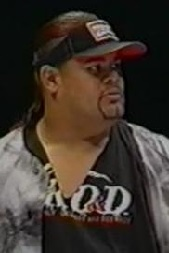
Jamal at an AJPW live event in November 2003

Fatu debuted in All Japan Pro Wrestling (AJPW) in November 2003 under his former ring name Jamal, immediately aligning himself with Taka Michinoku's Roughly Obsess and Destroy (R.O.D.) stable. He most often teamed with fellow members Taiyō Kea and Buchanan, though he began to receive a push as a singles wrestler in early 2004. Entering that year's Champion Carnival, he failed to advance past the group stages, though earned a major upset win over Keiji Mutō. In May, he began a feud with Toshiaki Kawada, setting his sights on Kawada's Triple Crown Heavyweight Championship. The two fought for the belt on June 12 in Nagoya, Aichi, where Kawada was victorious. After this loss, Jamal spent the rest of 2004 primarily focused on the tag division, and on December 1, 2004, he and frequent partner Taiyō Kea won the World's Strongest Tag Determination League tournament, beating Kaz Hayashi and Satoshi Kojima in the final.

The following month on January 16, 2005, they won the World Tag Team Championship for the first time, beating New Japan Pro-Wrestling (NJPW) representatives Hiroshi Tanahashi and Yutaka Yoshie. Following this win, he was once again pushed in that year's Champion Carnival, earning big wins over established names such as Kawada and Kojima on his way to the final, where he lost to Kensuke Sasaki in Tokyo. With a strong record of wins against champion Satoshi Kojima, Jamal began to pursue the Triple Crown once again in August, culminating in a match between the two in Sapporo on September 1, where Jamal was once again defeated. After this, he once again entered the Real World Tag League with Kea, however, they failed to advance past the group stages. Jamal left All Japan Pro Wrestling in December 2005.

=== Return to WWE (2005–2009) ===
==== Undefeated streak (2005–2007) ====
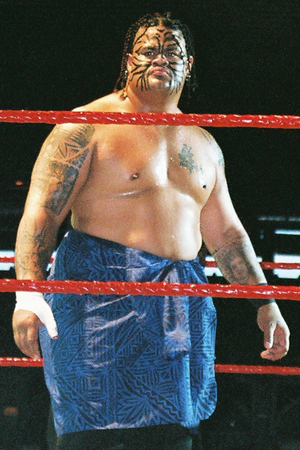
Umaga in July 2006

In December 2005, Fatu had re-signed with World Wrestling Entertainment. Fatu returned on the April 3, 2006, post-WrestleMania 22 episode of Raw with a new character called Umaga, the same name of the final and most painful part of the Samoan tattooing process, meaning "the end"; he was depicted as a destructive savage who could be controlled only by his manager, Armando Alejandro Estrada. Umaga attacked Ric Flair in his debut at the orders of Estrada. He then defeated Flair at Backlash on April 30.

In mid–2006, Umaga started a winning streak against the majority of the Raw roster, including going over top stars John Cena, Shawn Michaels, and Triple H. His next feud started on August 20 at SummerSlam, where he was supposed to be an enforcer on behalf of Vince McMahon and Shane McMahon during their match against D-Generation X (Shawn Michaels and Triple H), only to be attacked by Kane as he made his entrance. Umaga feuded with Kane for the next two months (including a double countout at Unforgiven on September 17) until Umaga won a Loser Leaves Raw match on the October 9 episode of Raw, sending Kane off of the brand. After being separated by different brands, Umaga and Kane had one final match at Cyber Sunday on November 5, where Umaga again defeated Kane.

Umaga, having still not been pinned, was then deemed the number one contender for the WWE Championship and placed into a feud with then-champion John Cena over the title. Cena retained his belt at the New Year's Revolution pay-per-view on January 7, 2007 by pinning Umaga with a roll-up, officially ending his undefeated streak. In that time, Umaga was never pinned or made to submit on television, but he suffered two losses by disqualification and another in a double countout. For the rest of the month, Armando Alejandro Estrada played down Cena's victory, claiming it was a fluke, until a Last Man Standing rematch was signed for the Royal Rumble on January 28. On an episode of Raw between the two pay-per-views, Umaga attacked Cena causing a worked injury to his spleen and putting the match in jeopardy. Cena (kayfabe) refused a medical exam, the results of which could cause him to forfeit his title, and then defeated Umaga at the Royal Rumble after wrapping a loosened ring rope around his neck during an STFU.

==== Intercontinental Champion (2007–2008) ====
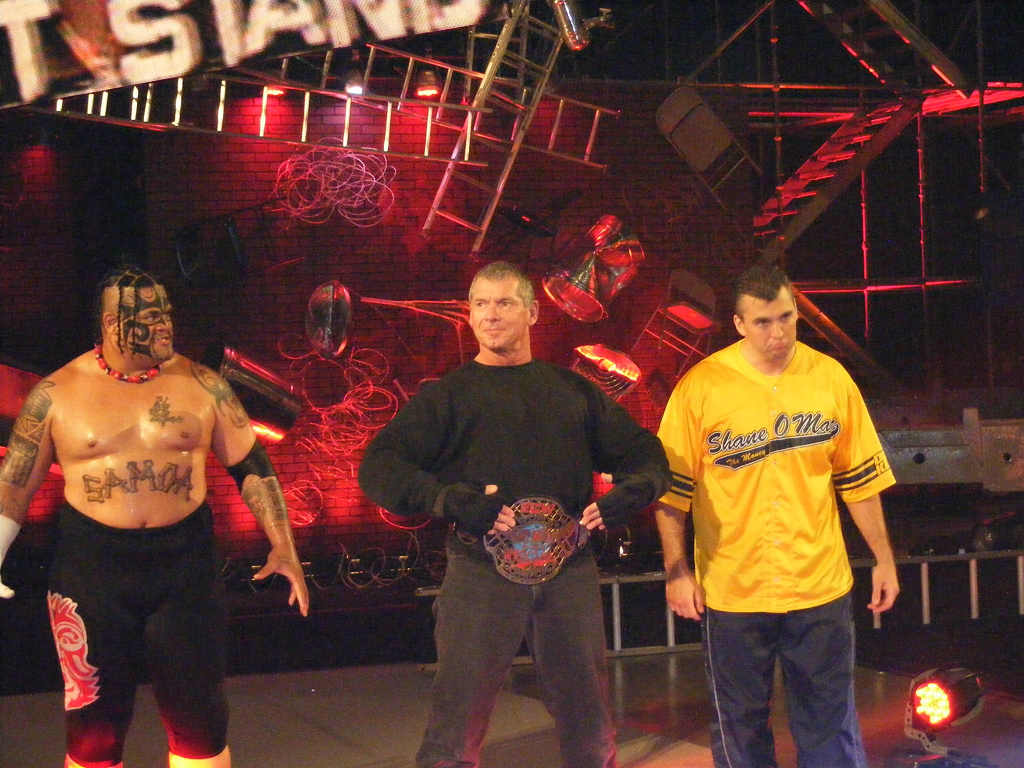
Umaga (left) at One Night Stand in June 2007 with Vince McMahon and Shane McMahon

On the February 19 episode of Raw, Umaga was named Vince McMahon's representative for "Battle of the Billionaires" with Donald Trump at WrestleMania 23. Immediately after choosing Umaga, McMahon granted him a match against the Intercontinental Champion Jeff Hardy, which he won to win the Intercontinental Championship. After Bobby Lashley was named Trump's representative, the two began a feud which lasted even beyond WrestleMania. At WrestleMania on April 1, Umaga lost the Battle of the Billionaires' hair versus hair match and caused McMahon to get his head shaved, afterwards Umaga quietly parted ways with his manager Estrada who in reality was suspended from appearing on television because there were too many people at ringside during the match. On the April 16 episode of Raw, Lashley interfered in a match and helped a planted fan, Santino Marella, defeat Umaga for the Intercontinental Championship. On April 29 at Backlash, Umaga, Vince, and Shane McMahon wrestled Lashley for his ECW World Championship in a handicap match, winning the title for Vince. Umaga would continue to be involved with that feud, competing at Judgment Day on May 20 in a rematch for the ECW World Championship, which was once again a handicap match with the McMahons and Umaga taking on Lashley, which Lashley won. However, Lashley did not win the ECW World Championship because he pinned Shane and not the champion, Vince. The feud culminated on June 3 at One Night Stand, with Umaga aiding Vince in defending the ECW World Championship against Lashley in a Street Fight, which Vince lost.

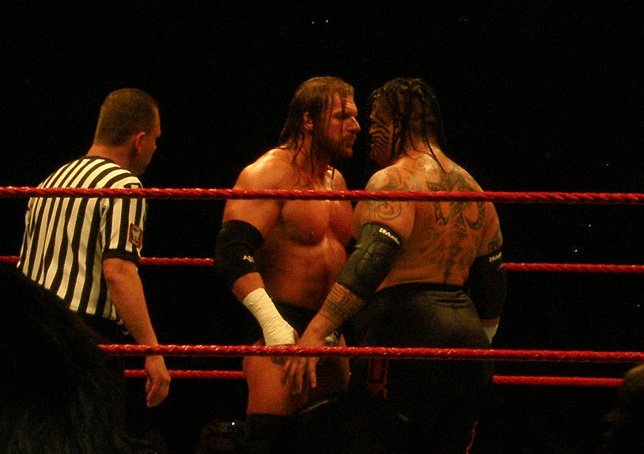
Umaga facing Triple H in November 2007

In June, Umaga was re-entered into a feud with Marella. When they met at the Vengeance pay-per-view on June 24, Umaga was solidly in control of the match, but lost by disqualification when he disregarded the referee's instructions and continued to punch Marella. In a rematch on the July 2 episode of Raw, Umaga defeated Marella to win the Intercontinental Championship for the second time. On the August 6 episode of Raw, Umaga turned face by joining forces with John Cena to face Carlito and Randy Orton in a tag team match on August 13, which they won. He defeated both Carlito and Mr. Kennedy in a triple threat match at SummerSlam on August 26 to retain the Intercontinental Championship. He then interrupted a match between Kennedy and the returning Jeff Hardy the following night on Raw, assaulting Hardy and leaving him lying in the ring, thus turning heel once again. One week later, on the September 3 episode of Raw, Umaga lost the Intercontinental Championship to Hardy.

Later that night, he teamed with Carlito in a handicap match against Triple H, after which Triple H struck him several times with his signature sledgehammer, injuring him. He was given a match against Triple H on October 7 at No Mercy, which was changed to a title match for the WWE Championship during the event when Triple H won the title earlier that night. Umaga was defeated by Triple H in their match. At Survivor Series on November 18, his team lost to Triple H's team in a Survivor Series match. On March 30, 2008, at WrestleMania XXIV, Umaga was defeated by Batista.

==== Final feuds (2008–2009) ====
On the June 23 episode of Raw, Umaga was drafted to the SmackDown brand, as a part of the 2008 WWE draft. Umaga suffered a torn PCL at a live event in Johnson City, Tennessee, on August 2. After two promos hyping his return to the brand, on the January 30, 2009, episode of SmackDown, Umaga returned with a new entrance theme, defeating Jimmy Wang Yang. Umaga then suffered his first defeat since his return against Triple H by disqualification on the March 6 episode of SmackDown, after The Legacy attacked Triple H.

On the May 1 episode of SmackDown, Umaga returned from a two-month hiatus, attacking CM Punk on multiple occasions, repeatedly interrupting Punk's attempts to cash in his Money in the Bank briefcase. On May 17 at Judgment Day, Umaga defeated Punk, but lost to Punk at Extreme Rules on June 7 in a Samoan Strap match, ending their feud in what was Umaga's last appearance in WWE. On June 8, 2009, WWE announced that Fatu was released from his WWE contract. It was later revealed that his termination was due to violation of the Wellness Policy; even though this was only his second failure, his refusal to enter rehabilitation led to his dismissal.

=== Independent circuit (2009) ===
On July 11, 2009, Umaga appeared at the World Wrestling Council (WWC) in Puerto Rico, defeating Mr. Anderson (formerly Mr. Kennedy). In November, Umaga appeared on Hulk Hogan's Hulkamania Tour of Australia under the ring name Uso Fatu. On November 24, Fatu defeated Brutus Beefcake, and two days later, he and Orlando Jordan lost to Beefcake and Mr. Anderson. On November 28, 2009, Fatu wrestled his final match, where he defeated Anderson. Shortly before his death, Fatu reportedly reached an agreement to return to WWE at the Royal Rumble in January 2010.

== Personal life ==
Fatu and his wife L.T. had four children, one of whom, being his son Isayah, is also a professional wrestler, having trained in Booker T's Reality of Wrestling promotion in December 2022. He would make his professional wrestling debut on July 15, 2023 under the ring name "Zilla Fatu", but left the promotion three months later with Booker T citing irreconcilable differences. They later reconciled and Isayah returned to working for ROW.

During the weekend of August 30, 2007, articles posted by Sports Illustrated, the New York Daily News, and The Washington Post named Fatu as one of many superstars to have purchased pharmaceuticals from an online pharmacy, which was a violation of the WWE "Talent Wellness" program. Fatu specifically was said to have received somatotropin, a growth hormone, between July and December 2006, after the "no drugs from online sources" rule was instituted. In June 2009, Fatu violated the Wellness Policy once again; due to his uncooperation and refusal to attend drug rehabilitation, he was released from his WWE contract.

On April 27, 2008, Fatu's mother Vera died after a seven-year battle with cancer.

== Death and legacy ==
On December 4, 2009, Fatu was found by his wife on the couch in their Houston, Texas home, unresponsive and with blood coming from his nose. A 911 call was made and Fatu was rushed to a hospital by ambulance. Paramedics determined Fatu was suffering a heart attack and they were able to restart his heart, although he showed no signs of brain activity. He was kept on life support for much of that Friday, and later suffered a second heart attack; he was ultimately pronounced dead at around 5:00 p.m. CST. He was 36 years old. Toxicology reports revealed that Fatu had the drugs hydrocodone (a painkiller), carisoprodol (Soma, a muscle relaxant), and diazepam (Valium) in his system. Houston medical examiners also found that Fatu had both heart and liver disease. It was determined that the combination of Fatu's repeated drug use and his heart disease ultimately led to his death, which was officially ruled to have been due to a heart attack brought on by an acute toxicity of multiple substances. On the day of his death, his nephews The Usos (Jonathan and Joshua) signed their developmental contracts with WWE through Florida Championship Wrestling.

His other nephew, Joseph (better known as Solo Sikoa) uses the Samoan Spike as his finisher in tribute.

His son, Isayah (better known as Zilla Fatu), also uses the Samoan Spike as his finisher.

== Other media ==
As Umaga, Fatu appears as a playable character in WWE SmackDown vs. Raw 2007, WWE SmackDown vs. Raw 2008, WWE SmackDown vs. Raw 2009, WWE SmackDown vs. Raw 2010, WWE 2K22 as downloadable content, WWE 2K23, WWE 2K24, and WWE 2K25 as both Jamal and Umaga.

== Championships and accomplishments ==
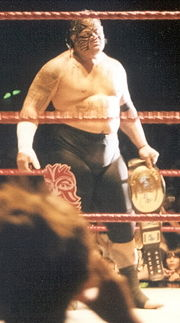
Umaga was a two-time WWE Intercontinental Champion

- All Japan Pro Wrestling
  - World Tag Team Championship (1 time) – with Taiyō Kea
  - World's Strongest Tag Determination League (2004) – with Taiyō Kea
  - January 2 Korakuen Hall Heavyweight Battle Royal (2004)
- Frontier Martial-Arts Wrestling
  - FMW/WEW Hardcore Tag Team Championship (1 time) – with Matty Samu
- Heartland Wrestling Association
  - HWA Tag Team Championship (2 times) – with Kimo
- Memphis Championship Wrestling
  - MCW Southern Tag Team Championship (3 times) – with Kimo
- Pro Wrestling Illustrated
  - Ranked No. 22 of the top 500 singles wrestlers in the PWI 500 in 2007
- World Wrestling Entertainment
  - WWE Intercontinental Championship (2 times)
- Wrestling Observer Newsletter
  - Worst Tag Team (2002) with Rosey

== Luchas de Apuestas record ==
Winner (wager)	Loser (wager)	Location	Event	Date	Notes
Bobby Lashley (Donald Trump's hair)	Umaga (Vince McMahon's hair)	Detroit, Michigan	WrestleMania 23	April 1, 2007	(Note: Stone Cold Steve Austin was the special guest referee.)

== See also ==
- List of premature professional wrestling deaths
