= WrestleMania 23 =

2007 World Wrestling Entertainment pay-per-view event

- Promotional poster featuring various WWE wrestlers, Vince McMahon, and Donald Trump
- Promotion: World Wrestling Entertainment
- Brand(s): Raw; SmackDown! ECW
- Date: April 1, 2007
- City: Detroit, Michigan
- Venue: Ford Field
- Attendance: 74,287
- Buy rate: 1,250,000
- Tagline: All Grown Up

Pay-per-view chronology
| ← Previous; No Way Out | Next → Backlash |

WrestleMania chronology
| ← Previous; 22 | Next → XXIV |

WrestleMania 23 was a 2007 professional wrestling pay-per-view (PPV) event produced by World Wrestling Entertainment (WWE). It was the 23rd annual WrestleMania and took place on April 1, 2007, at Ford Field in Detroit, Michigan, held for wrestlers from the promotion's Raw, SmackDown!, and ECW brand divisions. It was the second WrestleMania to take place in Metro Detroit, after WrestleMania III, which was held at the Pontiac Silverdome in Pontiac, Michigan. It was also the first WrestleMania to feature the ECW brand following its establishment as WWE's third brand in May 2006. This was the final WrestleMania to air in 4:3 standard definition, with all subsequent WrestleManias being aired in 16:9 high definition.

Eight professional wrestling matches were scheduled for the event, which featured a supercard, a scheduling of more than one main event. The main event of the show, which was the main match on the Raw brand, was John Cena versus Shawn Michaels for the WWE Championship, in which Cena won. The predominant match on the SmackDown! brand was Batista versus The Undertaker for the World Heavyweight Championship, in which The Undertaker was victorious. The primary match on the ECW brand saw ECW World Champion Bobby Lashley (representing Donald Trump) defeat Raw's Intercontinental Champion Umaga (representing Vince McMahon) in a match where either Trump or McMahon would be shaved bald if their wrestler lost. The match was billed as the "Battle of the Billionaires". Other featured matches included an eight-man tag team match between The ECW Originals and The New Breed (which The ECW Originals won), and an eight-man interpromotional Money in the Bank ladder match where Mr. Kennedy defeated CM Punk, Edge, Finlay, Jeff Hardy, King Booker, Matt Hardy, and Randy Orton.

Tickets for the event went on sale on November 11, 2006. The event set the all-time Ford Field attendance record of 74,287 people, coming from all 50 U.S. states, 24 countries, and nine Canadian provinces. WrestleMania 23 grossed US$5.38 million in ticket sales, breaking the previous record of $3.9 million held by WrestleMania X8. WWE estimated that $25 million was pumped into the Detroit economy. With about 1.2 million buys, the event was the most bought WWE pay-per-view in history at the time. WrestleMania XXVIII in 2012 surpassed the event as the most bought WWE pay-per-view, receiving 1.21 million buys. WrestleMania 23 was also the fifth highest attended WrestleMania in history behind only WrestleMania 29 (which drew 80,676 fans), WrestleMania 35 (which drew 82,265 fans), WrestleMania III (which drew 93,173 fans), and WrestleMania 32 (which drew 101,763 fans).

== Production ==
=== Background ===
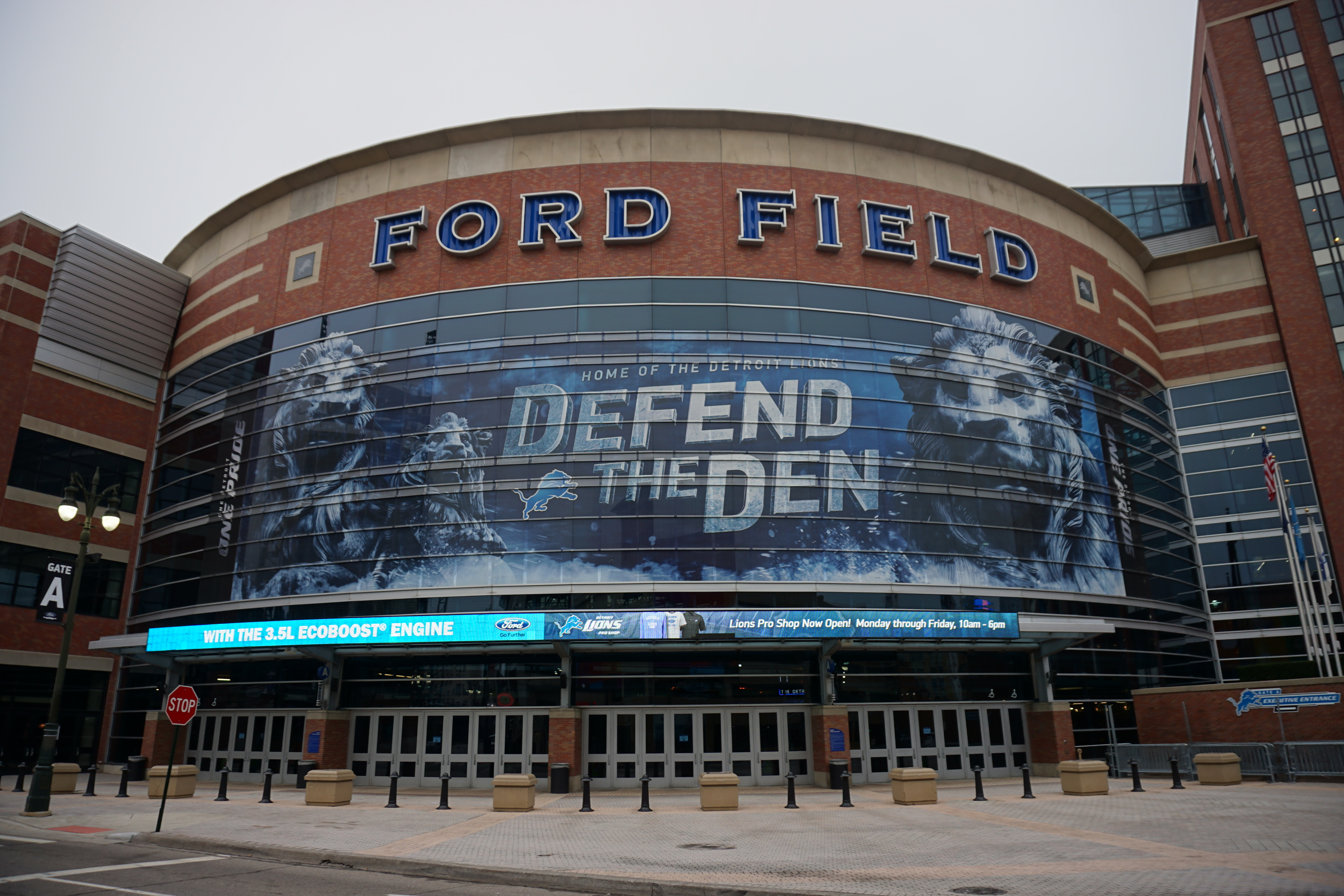
The event was held at Ford Field in Detroit, Michigan.

WrestleMania is considered World Wrestling Entertainment's (WWE) flagship professional wrestling pay-per-view (PPV) event, having first been held in 1985. It has become the longest-running professional wrestling event in history and is held annually between mid-March to mid-April. It was the first of WWE's original four pay-per-views, which includes Royal Rumble, SummerSlam, and Survivor Series, referred to as the "Big Four". WrestleMania 23 was scheduled to be held on April 1, 2007, at Ford Field in Detroit, Michigan. The event featured wrestlers from the Raw, SmackDown!, and ECW brands, which was the first to feature ECW, a relaunch of the former Extreme Championship Wrestling (ECW) promotion that became a WWE brand in May 2006, subsequently also being the first to feature the ECW World Championship (although it was not defended at this event as the champion competed in a non-title match).

The set design for WrestleMania 23 began development in October 2006, after WWE set designer Jason Robinson received the final logo for the event from management under the direction of Vince McMahon. Robinson and his team first surveyed Ford Field in July 2006 and began planning out the staging and lighting designs. After returning to the stadium in January 2007 for more site surveying, Robinson and his team finalized the set's design in February. The final design resulted in WrestleMania 23 having the largest set ever built for a WrestleMania event. It incorporated 414 LED video screens and automated lights, 10 spotlights, 56 searchlights, 50,000 ft of cable for pyrotechnics and other use, and 35 stage flamethrowers used to produce 30 ft high and 6 ft wide flames, all which gave the set a unique look for each performer's entrance and an expanded stage lighting element of 300 ft in width and 100 ft in height using the specialized stage lighting instruments. The ramp used to reach the ring from the entrance set was 187 ft in length.

Though it took three weeks to fully prepare Ford Field, set assembly began the week before WrestleMania 23 and was completed shortly before the day of the event. It took a week for 300 staff members, unloading and working from 40 semi-trucks, to build the set and assemble the event's lighting within Ford Field, far more than the usual 40 hours, 100 staff members, and 14 semi-trucks required for the production of WWE's weekly television events. After the event concluded, it took around thirty hours to disassemble the set and lighting, also far more than the usual three hours required for WWE's weekly television events.

=== Storylines ===
WrestleMania 23 featured professional wrestling matches involving wrestlers from existing scripted feuds and storylines played out on WWE's television programs, Monday Night Raw, ECW on Sci-Fi and Friday Night SmackDown!, along with Raw's supplementary show Heat.

==== Major feuds ====
The main staged rivalry heading into WrestleMania 23 was between Vince McMahon and Donald Trump. On the January 8 episode of Raw, Trump faced off against his real-life rival, Rosie O'Donnell. Trump won the contest, although local wrestlers portrayed Trump and O'Donnell. During McMahon's "Fan Appreciation Night" on the January 29 episode of Raw, Trump interrupted and dropped large sums of money into the arena. The following month, the two came up with a match for WrestleMania, where the stipulations for the match were that they each had to choose a representative to wrestle for them, and the loser would have his head shaved bald. This match was then billed as the "Battle of the Billionaires". McMahon picked Umaga as his representative, while Trump picked Bobby Lashley. After successfully defending his ECW World Championship against Hardcore Holly in a Steel Cage match—a match in which the ring is surrounded by a steel cage—on an episode of ECW on Sci Fi, Lashley charged at the cage, slammed through it, and landed atop Umaga, who was at ringside. On the March 5 edition of Raw, "Stone Cold" Steve Austin was appointed as special guest referee for the "Battle of the Billionaires" match at WrestleMania 23. On the March 26 episode of Raw, McMahon faced off against Lashley in a No Disqualification match. In the match, several people interfered on McMahon's behalf, including Lance Cade and Trevor Murdoch, Chris Masters, Johnny Nitro, and Umaga. This interference allowed McMahon to win the bout.

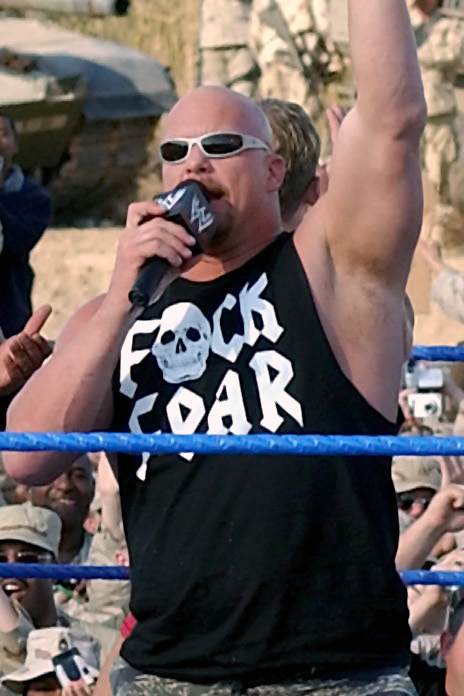
"Stone Cold" Steve Austin was the special guest referee for the "Battle of the Billionaires" match.

The main rivalry on the Raw brand was between John Cena and Shawn Michaels over the WWE Championship. After The Undertaker, the winner of the 2007 Royal Rumble match, made his decision to face Batista for the World Heavyweight Championship at WrestleMania, a match to determine the next challenger to the WWE Championship was announced. Michaels defeated Randy Orton and Edge in a Triple Threat match to earn a chance to face Cena at WrestleMania. On an edition of Raw, Orton and Edge, who were tag team partners as Rated-RKO, attempted to attack Cena, but Michaels ran-in and attacked them with steel chairs. Before a scheduled tag team match between Rated-RKO and Cena and Michaels, Orton played a video that highlighted the past friendships Michaels was involved in before turning on those friends. In the match, Michaels nearly superkicked Cena after Orton moved. Due to a later disagreement, Edge left Orton and walked off backstage, which allowed Cena and Michaels to win the match. The following week, Michaels responded to the video set-up by Orton and made comments regarding Cena.

I will have your back until WrestleMania. I've turned against all my partners and more importantly, I've stabbed all my friends in the back. But with you, John, it's different.

— Shawn Michaels commenting on his future WWE Championship match against John Cena.

After Michaels defeated Orton, Cena ran down to the ring and saved Michaels from an attack by Edge and Orton. On the final Raw before WrestleMania, Cena and Michaels teamed up to face Batista and The Undertaker in a rematch from their match at No Way Out. Cena and Michaels appeared set to win after performing a synchronized Five Knuckle Shuffle, but Michaels turned on Cena and superkicked him, allowing Batista and The Undertaker to win the match.

==== Undercard matches ====
The main feud on the SmackDown! brand was between Batista and The Undertaker over the World Heavyweight Championship. The Undertaker won the 2007 Royal Rumble match to earn a championship match against any one of WWE's three world championships (WWE, World Heavyweight, or ECW World). On the February 5 episode of Raw, The Undertaker chose to challenge Batista for the World Heavyweight Championship when he chokeslammed him at the center of the ring. In the weeks leading to WrestleMania 23, Batista and The Undertaker partook in tag team matches. At the beginning of the feud, Batista claimed to have great respect for The Undertaker; however, after several attacks by The Undertaker, Batista claimed to have lost all respect for him especially at No Way Out when Batista gained some payback by delivering a Spinebuster to The Undertaker, allowing Raw's WWE Champion, John Cena and Shawn Michaels to deliver their signature moves on The Undertaker for the victory during their inter-promotional WrestleMania 23 tag team main event. On the final Raw before WrestleMania during a rematch between Cena and Michaels against Batista and The Undertaker from No Way Out, The Undertaker walked out of the match in response to Batista attacking him during the first encounter, leaving Batista to fight alone against Cena and Michaels. However, Batista and The Undertaker would end up winning the match after Michaels betrayed Cena by hitting him with a superkick, which allowed Batista to pin Cena for the win.

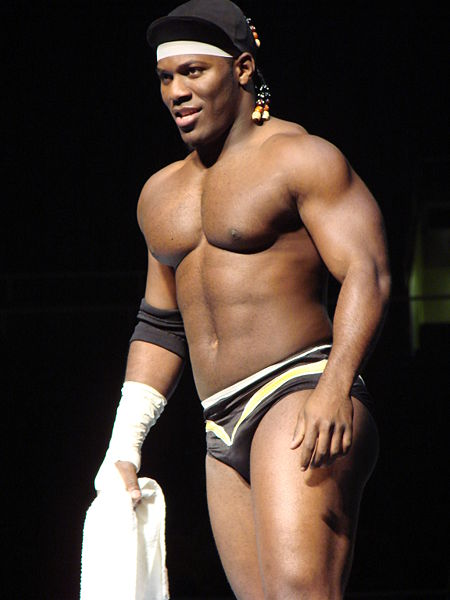
Elijah Burke was the leader of the New Breed stable.

The main feud on the ECW brand was between two teams of four; The ECW Originals and The New Breed. The feud mainly revolved around which team was the "dominant force" in the revived ECW brand. The two factions of four-faced off in several tag team matches throughout the weeks prior to the event. The New Breed seemed to have dominated for several weeks; however, ECW Originals leader, Rob Van Dam, defeated New Breed leader Elijah Burke in a singles match. ECW Original Tommy Dreamer issued the challenge to the New Breed for an eight-man tag team match at WrestleMania 23, which was accepted by Burke on behalf of The New Breed.

The last major feud involved eight men. Several weeks before WrestleMania 23, it was announced that the Money in the Bank ladder match would be held again, as it was in the last two years. This year, however, there would be eight men involved, rather than six the two previous years had. Throughout the weeks leading up to WrestleMania 23, qualifying matches took place on all three shows. On an edition of Raw, Edge, the winner of the match held in 2005, defeated Rob Van Dam, the winner of the match held in 2006, to earn the first spot in the match. The next night on ECW, another cross-brand match took place, with CM Punk defeating Johnny Nitro to qualify. On that week's SmackDown!, King Booker became the third man to qualify, defeating Kane in a Falls Count Anywhere match after The Great Khali interfered. On the next edition of Raw, Jeff Hardy pinned Shelton Benjamin in a match to become the fourth man to qualify. The next night on ECW, Mr. Kennedy defeated Sabu in an Extreme Rules match to earn the fifth spot. On the next SmackDown!, two qualifying matches took place, with Matt Hardy and Finlay winning their respective match to qualify when Matt Hardy defeated Joey Mercury and Finlay defeated Chris Benoit and Montel Vontavious Porter in the Triple threat qualification match. The final qualifying match took place on Raw between Carlito and Ric Flair. The match was deemed a no-contest after The Great Khali interfered and attacked both men. The following week, on Raw, Randy Orton defeated Flair and Carlito in an elimination match to become the final man to qualify. After Edge and Orton had split as a team, the two attempted to get the other taken out of the Money in the Bank ladder match. Both men failed, however, as Edge won a "last chance" battle royal to retain his spot and Orton won a match on ECW to retain his.

At No Way Out, WWE United States Champion Chris Benoit and the Hardy Boyz (Matt Hardy and Jeff Hardy) defeated MNM (Joey Mercury and Johnny Nitro) and Montel Vontavious Porter (MVP). After Benoit and MVP had some matches with the two in them (tag team and triple threat matches), MVP decided to start showing he was the "true" United States Champion. MVP would then have matches against the "champions" of other countries (including Luxembourg and Scotland, who in reality were jobbers), beating them within minutes. MVP then challenged Benoit for the title at WrestleMania 23.

== Event ==
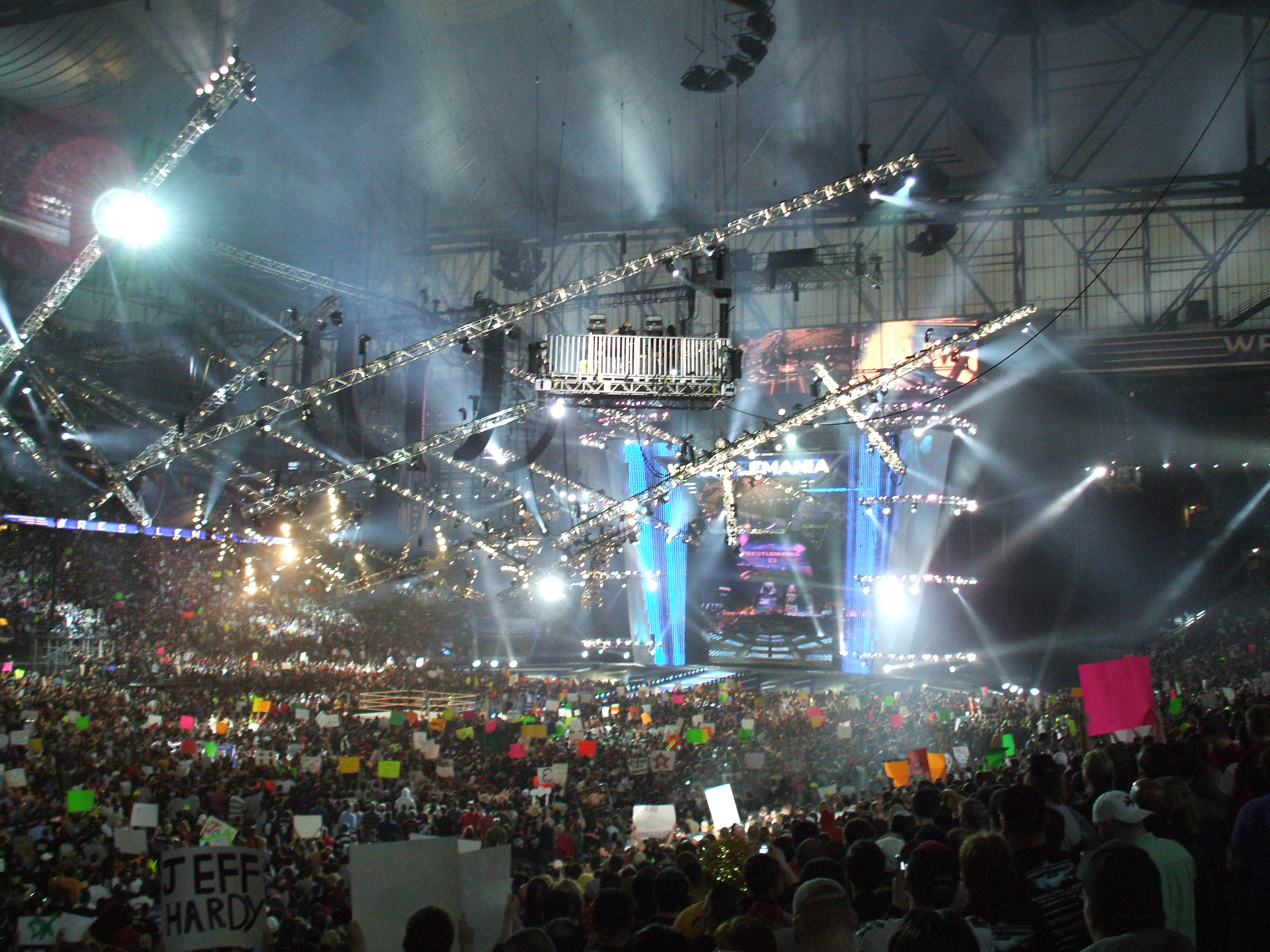
An attendance record setting 80,103 fans at Ford Field for WrestleMania 23

Other on-screen personnel
| Role: | Name: |
|---|---|
| English commentators | Jim Ross (Raw) |
| English commentators | Jerry Lawler (Raw) |
| English commentators | Michael Cole (SmackDown!) |
| English commentators | John "Bradshaw" Layfield (SmackDown!) |
| English commentators | Joey Styles (ECW) |
| English commentators | Tazz (ECW) |
| Spanish commentators | Carlos Cabrera |
| Spanish commentators | Hugo Savinovich |
| Interviewer | Todd Grisham |
| Ring announcer | Lilian Garcia (Raw/Money In The Bank) |
| Ring announcer | Tony Chimel (SmackDown!) |
| Ring announcer | Justin Roberts (ECW) |
| Ring announcer | Howard Finkel (WWE Hall of Fame) |
| Ring announcer | Theodore Long (Batista/Undertaker match) |
| Referee | Charles Robinson (SmackDown!) |
| Referee | Jim Korderas (SmackDown!) |
| Referee | Mickie Henson (SmackDown!) |
| Referee | Marty Elias (Raw) |
| Referee | Jack Doan (Raw) |
| Referee | Mike Chioda (Raw) |
| Referee | Chad Patton (Raw) |
| Referee | Scott Armstrong (ECW) |
| Referee | "Stone Cold" Steve Austin (Bobby Lashley vs. Umaga) |

=== Pre-show ===
Before the event went live on pay-per-view, Ric Flair and Carlito faced Gregory Helms and Chavo Guerrero in a tag team lumberjack match. Flair and Carlito controlled the early part of the match until Helms threw Flair over the top rope. The lumberjacks attacked Flair before throwing him back into the ring. Helms and Guerrero continued to beat on Flair, but couldn't pin Flair. Guerrero tried to end it with his frog splash, but Flair moved. Guerrero tagged in Helms, but Flair tagged in Carlito. Carlito dominated Helms, leading to Guerrero coming in to help Helms, but Flair came in and fought Guerrero. Flair and Guerrero took each other out of the ring, and before the lumberjacks could throw them back in the ring, Carlito hit the Backstabber on Guerrero to pick up the win for himself and Flair.

The event officially began with Aretha Franklin singing a rendition of "America the Beautiful", reprising her role from twenty years earlier at WrestleMania III.

=== Preliminary matches ===
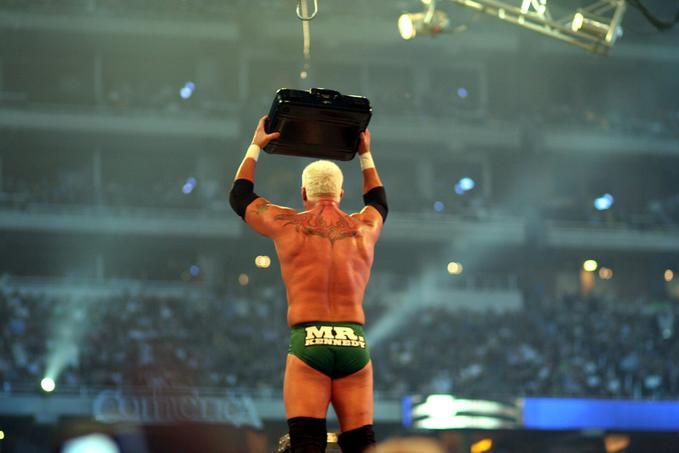
Mr. Kennedy grabs the briefcase to win the Money in the Bank ladder match.

In the first match that aired, Edge, Randy Orton, Jeff Hardy, King Booker (with Queen Sharmell), Mr. Kennedy, Matt Hardy, Finlay, and CM Punk competed in the third annual Money in the Bank ladder match. The match featured many notable spots, including points where Edge performed the Spear on all the other opponents, followed by Orton doing the same by performing the RKO later in the match. Kennedy missed a Kenton Bomb, landing on a ladder, and received a Swanton Bomb from Jeff. Several dangerous ladders spots were also featured, including Orton performing an RKO on Punk off a ladder, and Booker performing a Book End to Orton off the ladder as well. Midway through the match, Jeff climbed a fifteen-foot-high ladder inside the ring and on his brother, Matt's urging, he performed a leg drop off of that ladder onto Edge, through another ladder bridged between the ring apron and the barricade. They were carried off on stretchers by the paramedics. Later, when Booker was about to retrieve the contract briefcase, Matt held Booker's wife, Sharmell as a hostage, threatening to perform a Twist of Fate on her. Booker went to her aid and received the Twist of Fate from Matt. Finlay fought Matt for some time in the ring, and also performed the Celtic Cross to Matt onto a ladder. Finlay's associate Hornswoggle emerged from under the ring and attempted to retrieve the briefcase for Finlay. He was stopped by Kennedy, who performed his Green Bay Plunge on Hornswoggle. Kennedy went on to win the match, only after knocking Punk off a ladder by hitting him with another ladder.

The next match was billed as a "SmackDown! versus Raw Interpromotional match". Raw's The Great Khali faced SmackDown!'s Kane. It was a short match but contained a notable spot. In homage to Hulk Hogan slamming André the Giant twenty years earlier at WrestleMania III, Kane picked up Khali for the first time and body-slammed him to the mat. The match ended with Khali pinning Kane after a Giant Chokeslam. After the match, Khali choked Kane out with Kane's chained hook, which was a reference to Kane's movie, See No Evil, where his character used the hook as a signature weapon.

A backstage segment was featured next, which involved Cryme Tyme persuading Eugene to dance with Extreme Expose instead he danced with Mae Young and The Fabulous Moolah, who were dressed as strippers as Cryme Tyme danced with Extreme Exposé. Also featured in the segment were WWE Legends Slick, Ricky Steamboat, Jimmy Hart, Irwin R. Schyster, Dusty Rhodes, Sgt. Slaughter, Howard Finkel, Gene Okerlund, Pat Patterson and Gerald Brisco, many of whom had not been seen on television in years until Farooq interrupted the festivities with his signature "DAMN!" catchphrase.

In the fourth match, Chris Benoit faced Montel Vontavious Porter for the United States Championship. The match started off with a chain of takedowns, holds, and reversals, with MVP keeping up with Benoit, even going for some submission holds. The match lasted almost ten minutes, with Benoit attempting to lock in some of his signature submission holds, but MVP successfully reversed them, including the Crippler Crossface. The two exchanged suplexes and holds until Benoit executed a Diving headbutt on MVP, which led to Benoit getting the pinfall victory to retain the WWE United States Championship. This was Benoit's last WrestleMania match.

=== Main event matches ===
Long-time ring announcer Howard Finkel then introduced the WWE Hall of Fame Class of 2007. The next match featured Batista defending the World Heavyweight Championship against The Undertaker. The match started with Batista performing a Spear on The Undertaker as the bell sounded. The match went back and forth, with both men countering each other and performing their finishers. The Undertaker performed a Chokeslam, but Batista kicked out of the pinfall attempt. The Undertaker was then able to perform a Last Ride to Batista for a near-fall. Midway through the match, The Undertaker performed an Over The Top Rope Suicide Dive on Batista. At one point, Batista was able to perform a running powerslam on The Undertaker through a broadcast table. Back in the ring, Batista executed a Spinebuster followed by a Batista Bomb for a near-fall. The Undertaker then pinned Batista following a Tombstone piledriver to become the World Heavyweight Champion and emerge from WrestleMania with his winning streak intact. The Undertaker's win made him the first wrestler to have won both the World Heavyweight Championship and the WWE Championship at WrestleMania.

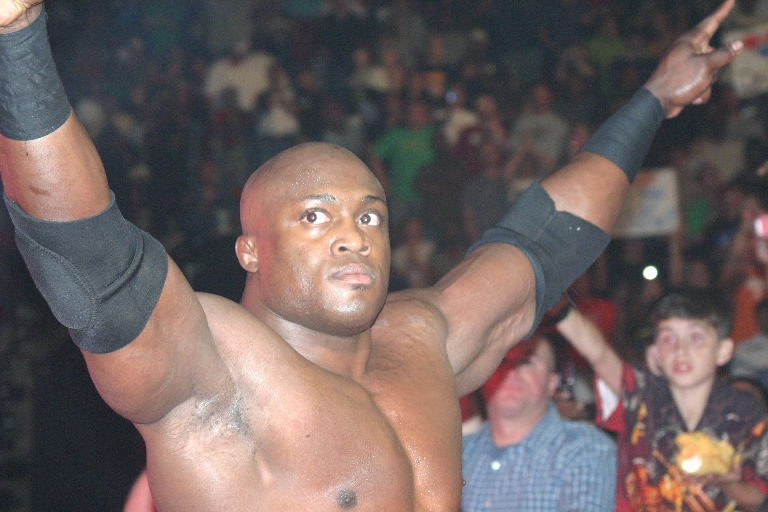
Bobby Lashley represented Donald Trump in the "Battle of the Billionaires".

The ECW Originals (Rob Van Dam, Sabu, Tommy Dreamer, and The Sandman) took on The New Breed (Elijah Burke, Kevin Thorn, Marcus Cor Von, and Matt Striker) next. The match started off with Cor Von working over Sabu. That changed when Cor Von tagged Striker, who missed an elbow after whipping Sabu into the ropes, allowing Sandman to get tagged. Sandman dominated Striker, and eventually tagged Van Dam. Van Dam used also dominated Striker but was poked in the eye, allowing Striker to tag in Burke. Burke had early success, but Van Dam regained the advantage and tagged Sandman again. Sandman worked on Burke until tagging Dreamer. Dreamer also beat down Burke until Cor Von received a blind tag and hit Dreamer from behind. Cor Von attacked Dreamer relentlessly and went over and punched Sabu, which distracted the referee and allowed Dreamer to be triple-teamed by Thorn, Burke, and Striker. Cor Von tagged in Burke who almost pinned Dreamer. Thorn entered next and almost performed his finishing move called the Original Sin. Dreamer managed to escape but was unable to tag his partners. Thorn tagged in Cor Von again who also almost pinned Dreamer. Cor Von tagged Thorn again, and Thorn resumed the beat down on Dreamer. Thorn tagged Striker next, and Striker attempted a suplex that Dreamer blocked and Dreamer suplexed Striker instead. Striker did not try to tag his partners and tried to stop Dreamer, but Dreamer tagged in Sabu. Sabu began to manhandle Striker and executed a leg drop from the top rope. Van Dam was then tagged in. Burke broke up Van Dam's pin attempt, which led to all competitors entering the ring. While the referee was distracted, Ariel gave Striker a chair. But Van Dam gave Striker a Van Daminator when he kicked the chair into Striker's face. Van Dam pinned Striker after a Five-Star Frog Splash to win the match for The Originals.

The match that WWE billed as the "Battle of the Billionaires" was next, as Umaga (accompanied by Vince McMahon and his handler Armando Alejandro Estrada) fought Bobby Lashley (accompanied by Donald Trump). "Stone Cold" Steve Austin served as the special guest referee. Trump was attended to by Tara Connor. Midway through the match, Austin was attacked by Umaga, causing him to become incapacitated and was taken out of the match for several minutes. Shane McMahon, who attempted to replace him as the referee, called the match while being biased toward Umaga. After Umaga got a near-fall on Lashley, Austin pulled Shane out of the ring, gave him a Stunner, and went back to the ring. Umaga attempted a Samoan Spike on Austin, but he avoided it and Stunned Umaga. Lashley took the opportunity and speared Umaga, then pinned him to get the victory. After the match, Trump and Lashley shaved Vince's head bald, followed by Austin executing a Stunner on Trump.

The next match was Melina against Ashley in a Lumberjill Match for the WWE Women's Championship. The match was short, as Melina Bridge pinned Ashley to retain the title. After the match, the lumberjills began brawling in the ring.

The main event was then current World Tag Team champions John Cena and Shawn Michaels facing each other for the WWE Championship. Incumbent champion Cena made a grand entrance by driving a Ford Mustang through the streets of Detroit and smashing through a glass panel upon entering the stadium. After a back-and-forth match, the longest of the night, Cena applied the STF on Michaels, Michaels submitted and Cena retained the title. Following the match, Cena embraced while holding his retained championship and offered to shake hands with Michaels, who refused and walked away. He soon turned back and Cena saluted him before walking back into the ring as he celebrated with pyrotechnics and confetti filling the Ford Field.

== Reception ==
The event received generally positive reviews. Canadian Online Explorer writers Dale Plummer and Nick Tylwalk rated the entire event 8 out of 10 stars, which was the same rating as the previous year's event. The lowest rated match on the card was Kane versus The Great Khali with a 0.5 out of a 10 star rating, the WWE Women's Championship match between Melina and Ashley was the second lowest rated match; it was rated 2 stars. The "Battle of the Billionaires" match was rated an 8 out of 10 stars. Batista versus The Undertaker for the World Heavyweight Championship match, one of the matches from the double main event, was rated 7.5 out of 10 stars. The main event match for the WWE Championship was rated a 9 out of 10 stars, and the Money in the Bank ladder match received the same rating. The attendance was reported to be 80,103 by numerous sources, a Ford Field record.

Years later, Batista himself expressed his belief that his match against the Undertaker should have been the main event instead of Michaels vs. Cena.

== Aftermath ==
WrestleMania 23 would be the last WrestleMania to air in 4:3 standard definition. Beginning in January 2008, all WWE pay-per-view events would air in 16:9 high definition. In addition, this would be the only WWE event to be held in Ford Field until SummerSlam which was held in August 2023.

=== Raw ===
John Cena and Shawn Michaels continued their feud, with Michaels betraying Cena the night after WrestleMania on Raw. During the second of two battle royals, Michaels eliminated himself and Cena, resulting in The Hardys winning the World Tag Team Championship. On the Raw before Backlash, Cena and Michaels wrestled an almost hour long non-title match, which Michaels won.

Mr. Kennedy lost his Money in the Bank contract to Edge on the May 7 episode of Raw, after Edge defeated Kennedy in a match with the briefcase on the line. Kennedy would be the only Money in the Bank contract holder to never cash in the briefcase until Otis in 2020. On the May 11, 2007, episode of SmackDown!, after the Undertaker retained the World Heavyweight Championship in a steel cage match against Batista via a draw and was attacked by Mark Henry, Edge successfully cashed the contract in on a beaten-down Undertaker and won the World Heavyweight Championship for the first time in his career.

=== SmackDown ===
Batista also continued his feud with The Undertaker, facing off against him in a Last Man Standing match the following month at Backlash. The match ended in a draw after both men failed to answer the ten count, therefore resulting in Undertaker retaining the title. The two faced each other in a Steel Cage match on the May 11, 2007, episode of SmackDown!, which also ended in a draw after both men escaped the cage at the same time. The feud ended when The Undertaker dropped the World Heavyweight Championship due to a legitimate injury. Edge, who won Kennedy's Money in the Bank contract in a match on Raw the previous Monday, cashed it in and defeated The Undertaker after the Steel cage match to win the title.

The match between Chris Benoit and Montel Vontavious Porter expanded into a lengthy feud for the WWE United States Championship, resulting in Benoit retaining via pinfall at Backlash and MVP winning the title in a two out of three falls match at Judgment Day, winning 2–0. Benoit would be drafted to ECW in June, and after missing Vengeance: Night of Champions as he was booked for a championship match, he then killed his wife, son, and finally himself that same weekend. This event would be the final WrestleMania appearance of Benoit.

=== ECW ===
Bobby Lashley's feud with Vince McMahon continued for a further three months after the event. Vince, livid after being embarrassed at WrestleMania, vowed to "kill" ECW and that the brand's destruction would start with him taking Lashley's ECW World Championship. At Backlash, Vince, his son Shane and Umaga teamed up in a Three on one handicap match against Lashley, and after two Samoan Splashes by Umaga from the top rope, Vince pinned Lashley to win the ECW World Championship. The feud continued for a further two pay-per-views, with Lashley pinning Shane in a rematch from Backlash at Judgment Day, but Vince declared that, since he did not get pinned, he was still the ECW World Champion before having Lashley subjected to a post-match beatdown by Umaga. At One Night Stand, Lashley finally defeated Vince in a Street Fight to reclaim the ECW World Championship, despite repeated interference from Shane and Umaga.

The feud between the ECW Originals and the New Breed continued, with the New Breed defeating the ECW Originals in an Extreme Rules match on the next edition of ECW. Sabu was released from the company shortly after WrestleMania, and The Sandman was drafted to Raw a few months later in the 2007 WWE Draft. Kevin Thorn left the New Breed shortly after WrestleMania and Marcus Cor Von was also released shortly thereafter. By this point, Elijah Burke and Matt Striker had ceased associating with one another, with Striker eventually being relegated to a manager role for Big Daddy V. In addition, Rob Van Dam left the company when his contract expired shortly after One Night Stand. As a result of all of this, the feud eventually fizzled out and was rarely mentioned again.

=== Sponsorship controversy ===
Rockford-Montgomery Labs, through their brand 360 OTC, was named as the official sponsor of the event. On January 19, 2008, WWE filed a lawsuit against the company alleging non-payment of the sponsorship funds. A similar lawsuit was also filed by NASCAR Cup Series team Bill Davis Racing, which had run WWE and WrestleMania 23 sponsorship as part of their sponsorship deal with 360 OTC.

== Results ==
| No. | Results | Stipulations | Times |
|---|---|---|---|
| 1^{D} | Ric Flair and Carlito defeated Gregory Helms and Chavo Guerrero by pinfall | Lumberjack match (Note: The lumberjacks were: Charlie Haas, Chris Masters, Eugene, Jim Duggan, Johnny Nitro, JTG, Kenny Dykstra, Lance Cade, Robbie McAllister, Rory McAllister, Shad Gaspard, Shelton Benjamin, Super Crazy, Trevor Murdoch, Val Venis and Viscera from Raw; Brian Kendrick, Daivari, Dave Taylor, Deuce, Domino, Funaki, Jamie Noble, Jimmy Wang Yang, The Miz, Paul London, Scotty 2 Hotty, Shannon Moore, Sylvain Grenier, Vito and William Regal from SmackDown; and Balls Mahoney, Hardcore Holly, Little Guido Maritato, Stevie Richards, and Snitsky from ECW.) | 6:12 |
| 2 | Mr. Kennedy defeated CM Punk, Randy Orton, Finlay, Matt Hardy, King Booker (with Queen Sharmell), Jeff Hardy, and Edge | Money in the Bank ladder match | 19:10 |
| 3 | The Great Khali defeated Kane by pinfall | Singles match | 5:30 |
| 4 | Chris Benoit (c) defeated Montel Vontavious Porter by pinfall | Singles match for the WWE United States Championship | 9:15 |
| 5 | The Undertaker defeated Batista (c) by pinfall | Title vs. Streak match for the World Heavyweight Championship | 15:46 |
| 6 | The ECW Originals (Rob Van Dam, Tommy Dreamer, Sabu, and The Sandman) defeated The New Breed (Elijah Burke, Marcus Cor Von, Matt Striker, and Kevin Thorn) (with Ariel) by pinfall | Eight-man tag team match | 7:27 |
| 7 | Bobby Lashley (with Donald Trump) defeated Umaga (with Mr. McMahon and Armando Alejandro Estrada) by pinfall | "Battle of the Billionaires" Hair vs. Hair match with "Stone Cold" Steve Austin as the special guest referee (Note: The Hair vs. Hair stipulation was between Donald Trump and Mr. McMahon.) | 13:00 |
| 8 | Melina (c) defeated Ashley by pinfall | Lumberjill match for the WWE Women's Championship (Note: The lumberjills were: Brooke, Candice Michelle, Jillian Hall, Kelly Kelly, Kristal Marshall, Layla, Maria, Michelle McCool, Mickie James, Torrie Wilson, Trinity, and Victoria.) | 3:40 |
| 9 | John Cena (c) defeated Shawn Michaels by submission | Singles match for the WWE Championship | 28:20 |
(c) / – the champion(s) heading into the match; D / – this was a dark match
