= Mario López Estrada =

Guatemalan businessman (1938–2023)

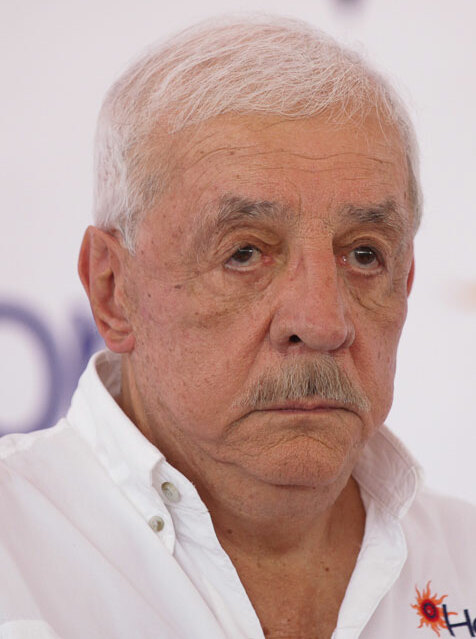
- Born: 21 March 1938; Guatemala City, Guatemala
- Died: 20 March 2023 (aged 84); Guatemala City, Guatemala
- Education: Universidad de San Carlos
- Occupation: Businessman
- Title: President of Tigo Guatemala

Mario López Estrada (21 March 1938 – 20 March 2023) was a Guatemalan telecommunications businessman and billionaire. He was the president and main shareholder of Tigo Guatemala.

== Biography ==
López Estrada studied Civil Engineering at Guatemala's San Carlos University. He started his professional career working as a public employee in Municipalidad de Guatemala (Guatemala City Hall) and Central Government. He then became an entrepreneur in the construction of roads across Guatemala and later housing projects. In 1972, he founded Constructora Maya, an independent construction company.

From 1986 to 1991, he worked as Minister for Communications, Infrastructure and Housing during the government of President Vinicio Cerezo. In 1993, he acquired a share of Comunicaciones Celulares, the state-owned, monopolistic telecommunications company that was about to be privatized. His participation in Comcel grew to 45% through successive share purchases. Comcel became the country's largest mobile phone service provider and was renamed Tigo Guatemala. In 2021, Millicom purchased López Estrada's 45% stake in Tigo for US$2.2 billion.

In 2015, he became a billionaire, according to Forbes. López Estrada was also the founder and President of the Board of Directors of Tigo Foundation. According to its website, Tigo Foundation is dedicated to support children in Guatemala with healthcare, education and sports. Their website also cites that from its foundation in 2009 to 2017, 250 schools have been built in the rural areas in Guatemala.

López Estrada was also a minority stakeholder in the local newspaper Prensa Libre.

== Distinctions ==
- May 2017: "Excellence in Business Recognition" from Forbes during the Genius Disruption forum in Guatemala City

== See also ==
- Carlos Slim
