= Mauro Astrada =

Argentine footballer

Personal information
- Full name: Mauro Román Astrada
- Date of birth: 14 November 1980 (age 45)
- Place of birth: Chabás, Santa Fe, Argentina
- Height: 1.85 m (6 ft 1 in)
- Position: Goalkeeper

Youth career
- Boca Juniors

Senior career*
Years	Team	Apps	(Gls)
2000–2003	Boca Juniors	0	(0)
2002–2003	→ Deportivo Italiano (loan)		
2003–2005	Mallorca B	14	(0)
2005–2006	Sportivo Italiano		
2006–2007	Temperley	10	(0)
2007	Deportivo Merlo	10	(0)
2008	Duque de Caxias	–	(–)
2008–2009	Luján de Cuyo	28	(0)
2009–2010	Gimnasia de Mendoza	29	(0)
2010	Desamparados	0	(0)
2011–2013	Unión Temuco	75	(0)
2013–2014	Deportes Temuco	0	(0)
2014–2015	Deportivo Maipú	10	(0)

Managerial career
- 2023: Deportivo Meza
- * Club domestic league appearances and goals

Mauro Astrada (born November 14, 1980) is an Argentine former footballer who played as a goalkeeper.

== Teams ==
=== Player ===
- (Argentina) Boca Juniors 2000–2002
- (Argentina) Deportivo Italiano 2002–2003
- (Spain) Mallorca B 2003–2005
- (Argentina) Sportivo Italiano 2005–2006
- (Argentina) Temperley 2006–2007
- (Argentina) Deportivo Merlo 2007
- (Brazil) Duque de Caxias 2008
- (Argentina) Luján de Cuyo 2008–2009
- (Argentina) Gimnasia y Esgrima de Mendoza 2009–2010
- (Chile) Unión Temuco 2011–2013
- (Chile) Deportes Temuco 2013–2014
- (Argentina) Deportivo Maipú 2014–2015

=== Manager ===
- (Chile) Deportivo Meza 2023

== Personal life ==
Following his retirement, Astrada made his home in Chile, got the Chilean citizenship, worked as a bank teller for BancoEstado and graduated as a financial operations specialist. He also served as the goalkeeper for the bank's football team.
