= Armando Estrada =

American professional wrestler and manager

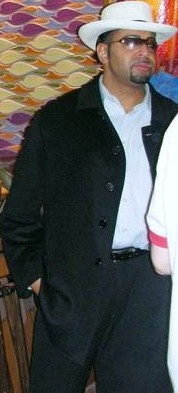
- Estrada in 2007

Personal information
- Born: Hazem Ali; December 20, 1976 (age 49) Chicago, Illinois, U.S.

Professional wrestling career
- Ring name(s): Armando Alejandro Estrada; Armando Estrada; Mr. AE; Osama; Osama Rodrigues Alejandro
- Billed height: 6 ft 2 in (188 cm)
- Billed weight: 230 lb (104 kg)
- Billed from: Cuba
- Trained by: Ohio Valley Wrestling
- Debut: 2004
- Retired: 2019

Hazem Ali (born December 20, 1976) is an American professional wrestler and manager. He is best known by his ring name Armando Alejandro Estrada or Armando Estrada, who works for WWE.

== Professional wrestling career ==
=== World Wrestling Entertainment (2004–2008) ===
==== Ohio Valley Wrestling (2004–2006) ====
Ali began his WWE career wrestling in their developmental territory, Ohio Valley Wrestling, making his OVW television debut as a bodyguard named "Osama" in Muhammad Hassan's entourage. When Hassan and Daivari were called up to the main roster, Ali remained in OVW wrestling with an Arab, anti-American character, similar to that of The Iron Sheik, and began wrestling in a tag team with Da Beast.

When Paul Heyman began booking OVW, he expanded Osama's name to "Osama Rodriguez Alejandro", revealing him to actually be half Cuban and half Palestinian. Along with being an active wrestler he became a backstage interviewer, conducting interviews with wrestler Robbie Dawber as a sidekick, for his own storyline Spanish language version of OVW's television show. At the same time, he began a storyline campaign to be elected "Dictator of Kentucky", which he intended to rename "Los Kentuckos", often coming to the ring with a placard reading "Bote for Lalo", purposely misspelling "Vote", based on his pronunciation and utilizing his nickname at the time: "Big Lalo".

==== Managing Umaga (2006–2007) ====
In April 2006, Ali was called up to the main WWE roster and placed on the Raw brand. He debuted on the April 3, 2006 edition of Raw as "Armando Alejandro Estrada", a Cuban businessman, and the heel manager for the also debuting Umaga. Estrada was given a backstory where his immediate family exploited its ties with Fidel Castro to live in commodity, while the rest of Havana (and even his uncle Manuel) lived in poverty. His debut saw him mocking Ric Flair, saying he was too old to still be in the business and promising to bring about a new hero (Umaga). Estrada led Umaga in a feud against Flair until the Backlash pay-per-view at the end of the month, where Umaga dispatched Flair.

Following the feud with Flair, Umaga began a period of squashing jobbers, before and after which Estrada would cut promos about his charge's greatness. During this time, he stopped introducing himself before promos, as his use of long rolling r's and a short "ha ha" laugh was beginning to get him cheered instead of booed. On top of this, his name was simplified to Armando Estrada.

At August's SummerSlam, Estrada offered the undefeated Umaga's services to The McMahons (Vince and Shane) to "take out" their D-Generation X (Shawn Michaels and Triple H) (DX) opponents during their tag team match. As Umaga attempted to deliver on Estrada's promise, however, he was attacked by Kane. Kane and Umaga feuded for two months, with Kane attacking Estrada on at least one occasion. The feud seemingly came to an end when, on the October 9, 2006 Raw, Estrada's interference helped Umaga defeat Kane in a Loser Leaves Raw match.

During December, Umaga, and thus Estrada, began a feud with John Cena over the WWE Championship. In the opening stages Estrada inserted himself into matches and confrontations with the two, leading to Vince McMahon's executive assistant Jonathan Coachman signing a match between Estrada and Cena. Before the match Estrada attempted to buy Cena off (offering him a box of Cohibas, his watch, and finally cash) only to have him refuse. The resulting match was a squash, with Cena winning with his signature FU (later called "Attitude Adjustment").

In February 2007, he managed Umaga to his first title, the Intercontinental Championship, and stood beside him during his partnership with Vince McMahon and feud with Bobby Lashley. As the Umaga and Lashley feud intensified, Lashley targeted Estrada after being banned from putting his hands on Umaga, Vince, or Shane McMahon outside of official matches; on the May 8 episode of ECW on Sci Fi, Lashley shoved a wheelchair-using Estrada down a ramp into a collection of garbage cans, in what turned out to be Estrada's last appearance (except for one cameo) for months. Estrada was then suspended from appearing on television for a few months because creative control felt that there were too many people were at ringside during the "Battle Of The Billionaires" match at WrestleMania 23.

==== ECW General Manager and subsequent release (2007–2008) ====
On August 14, 2007, during the broadcast of ‘‘ECW on Sci Fi’’, Armando Estrada was officially appointed as the General Manager of WWE's ECW brand. In this capacity, Estrada’s on-screen character was vested with authoritative control over match bookings, talent management, and the overall operational narrative of the ECW brand within WWE’s scripted programming.

In early 2008, a storyline was developed involving Estrada and Colin Delaney, an independent wrestler portrayed as an underdog competing without an official WWE contract. Exercising his (storyline) executive authority, Estrada subjected Delaney to a series of matches against a range of significantly larger and more experienced opponents, including The Big Show and the then-ECW Champion Chavo Guerrero Jr. Estrada stipulated that Delaney would earn a WWE contract only upon securing a victory against these opponents.

The narrative arc culminated on the May 6, 2008, episode of ‘‘ECW on Sci Fi’’, where Delaney defeated Estrada in a singles match, thereby fulfilling the conditions to receive an official WWE contract. The following week, Estrada announced that he had added himself to the ECW roster as an active competitor. In his debut match as an official ECW wrestler, he secured a victory over Delaney, furthering their ongoing storyline.

On June 3, 2008, Estrada was removed from his position as General Manager during an episode of ‘‘ECW on Sci Fi’’, with Theodore Long announced as his replacement. The (storyline) justification provided was that the WWE Board of Directors deemed it financially imprudent to compensate Estrada for both his managerial and wrestling roles.

Subsequently, Estrada’s character was depicted as striving to secure a wrestler’s contract, which parallels the earlier challenges he himself imposed on Delaney. During this period, he was primarily utilized as a “jobber,” which saw him lose matches to both established and debuting wrestlers while attempting to earn his contract within the storyline framework.

On the August 5, 2008, episode of ‘‘ECW on Sci Fi’’, Delaney aided Estrada in defeating Tommy Dreamer, allowing Estrada to (storyline) win his contract. His final televised appearance occurred on the August 12, 2008, episode, where he was defeated by Finlay.

On November 18, 2008, WWE officially announced Estrada’s release from his contract, concluding his tenure with the company after months of inactivity.

=== Independent circuit and semi-retirement (2008–2013) ===
Following his WWE release, Ali returned to the independent circuit. On January 3, 2009, Ali, wrestling under his Armando Alejandro Estrada ring name, teamed with Elijah Burke in a losing effort against Thunder and Lightning for the World Tag Team Championship at the World Wrestling Council's event Euphoria. Before this, he also managed Team 3D in a match for the titles, which Thunder and Lightning won. On March 21 at Great Lakes Championship Wrestling's event, Two Worlds...Two Sweet, Ali, under the ring name "Mr. AE", defeated Al Snow for the GLCW Heavyweight Championship. On October 12, 2012 at a PWS Event, Estrada faced Jim Duggan in a losing effort. On October 20, 2012 at a Great Lakes Championship Wrestling's event, AE lost the GLCW Heavyweight Championship to Robbie E in a 3-way match. on December 1, 2012 at a Great Lakes Championship Wrestling's event, AE teamed with Billy Gunn and Jay Bradley to face Too Cool (Scotty 2 Hotty, Grand Master Sexay) and Rikishi in a six-man tag team match in a losing effort. He retired in 2013.

=== Return to WWE (2010–2012) ===
Estrada re-signed with WWE in December 2010, but wouldn't be used until the May 26, 2011 episode of WWE Superstars, when he returned as the manager of Tyson Kidd. Estrada had shed his previous image (including the Estrada character's previous accent), instead being presented as more of a professional businessman. The union proved to be brief, as Kidd's hunt for the right manager continued the following week. Although he was not seen on television again, Estrada actually remained contracted until June 26, 2012, before being let go by WWE, officially on July 2, 2012.

=== All American Wrestling (2019) ===
In March 2019, Estrada made his return to professional wrestling with a role as manager of Jacob Fatu, nephew of former client Umaga.

=== Second return to WWE (2024–present) ===
In September 2024, Estrada signed a legends contract with WWE.

== Personal life ==
After his first departure from WWE, Estrada opened a restaurant, "Baby's Steak and Lemonade," in Glendale, Arizona. The restaurant has since closed.

He appeared in a Cypress Hill music video in 2010. He speaks fluent Arabic.

== Championships and accomplishments ==
- Great Lakes Championship Wrestling
  - GLCW Heavyweight Championship (1 time)
- Pro Wrestling Illustrated
  - Ranked No. 407 of the top 500 singles wrestlers in the PWI 500 in 2008
