= Nick Mitchell =

American professional wrestler, mixed martial artist (born 1982)

Personal information
- Born: Nicholas Cole Mitchell; November 9, 1982 (age 43) Magnolia, Texas, U.S.
- Education: Northwestern State University; Blinn College

Professional wrestling career
- Ring name(s): Mitch; Nick Mitchell
- Billed height: 6 ft 2 in (188 cm)
- Billed weight: 250 lb (113 kg)
- Trained by: Al Snow; Deep South Wrestling; Ohio Valley Wrestling
- Debut: 2004
- Retired: 2022

Nicholas Cole Mitchell (born November 9, 1982) is an American retired professional wrestler and mixed martial artist. He is best known for his appearances with World Wrestling Entertainment (WWE) in 2006 under the ring name Mitch as part of the Spirit Squad.

Mitchell played football for the Beaumont Drillers while at Blinn College. After not being accepted for a National Football League combine, he focused on a career in wrestling and participated in the fourth season of Tough Enough. Despite not winning, he signed a developmental contract with WWE, and was assigned to their developmental territory, Deep South Wrestling, where he wrestled as "Big Time" Nick Mitchell. He was later moved to Ohio Valley Wrestling (OVW) where he joined the Spirit Squad faction. After the Spirit Squad were called up to the Raw roster, they debuted in January 2006, and won the World Tag Team Championship three months later. Following the split of the team, Mitchell was released from his WWE contract in May 2007. Mitchell then had a brief career in mixed martial arts.

== American football career ==
Mitchell graduated from The Woodlands High School in 2001. In high school, Mitchell played four years of varsity football, on both sides of the ball. He received a full scholarship to Northwestern State University of the Southland Conference, but was expelled for fighting during his freshman season. After attending Blinn College in Bryan, Texas for two semesters, Mitchell joined the Beaumont Drillers of the National Indoor Football League in 2003. After a season with them, he attended a National Football League combine, but was told to go home after officials found out he had been expelled from college for fighting.

== Professional wrestling career ==
=== World Wrestling Entertainment (2004–2007) ===
==== Tough Enough; developmental territories (2004–2006) ====
Mitchell took part in the fourth season of World Wrestling Entertainment's reality series Tough Enough in 2004. He was the first to be eliminated. Despite not winning, he was still signed to a WWE developmental contract and assigned to the company's developmental territory, Deep South Wrestling. Several other competitors from Tough Enough were also signed, including Daniel Puder, Mike Mizanin, and Marty Wright, but near the end of 2006, Mitchell and Mizanin were the only two left on the main WWE roster. He began wrestling under the name "Big Time" Nick Mitchell, and competed against wrestlers including Kid Kash and Johnny Parisi.

Mitchell later suffered a knee injury, and although it was feared that he had torn his Anterior cruciate ligament, he was moved to Ohio Valley Wrestling (OVW) where he joined the Spirit Squad. Within days of his debut, the Squad was called up to the main WWE roster.

==== Spirit Squad; release (2006–2007) ====
As part of The Spirit Squad, a group consisting of five wrestlers who used the in-ring personas of male cheerleaders, he adopted the name Mitch. As a result of his ACL injury, his ability to wrestle was curtailed and Mitch spent the first few months of his time in the Spirit Squad in a non-wrestling role. On January 23, 2006, they had their WWE television debut as a group, appearing on Raw and helping Jonathan Coachman win a Royal Rumble qualifying match against Jerry "The King" Lawler by performing cheers for Coachman and distracting Lawler. They later became a part of the ongoing scripted feud between WWE chairman Vince McMahon and Shawn Michaels. The villainous McMahon brought in the Spirit Squad to attack Michaels on numerous occasions, including placing them in multiple handicap matches.

They also wrestled in the tag team division, and on April 3, on Raw, won the World Tag Team Championship when Kenny and Mikey defeated Big Show and Kane, with outside help from the other three Spirit Squad members as they attacked The Big Show in order to gain the advantage. After winning the championship, all five members of the team were recognized as the champions, allowing any combination of them to defend the championship.

Three weeks later, McMahon scheduled another handicap match, with The Spirit Squad facing Michaels. The match never started, however; instead The Spirit Squad attacked Michaels, ripping apart his ring attire and, as part of the storyline, shattering his knee with a steel chair. McMahon then called Triple H to the ring to attack Michaels with a sledgehammer; however, Kenny snatched the sledgehammer away, disrespecting Triple H, which led to him attacking the group. Triple H and Michaels revived D-Generation X (DX), since their teased reunion in 2002, and as a team began a feud with the Spirit Squad. DX played various sophomoric pranks on the team and the McMahons (Vince and Shane), as well as defeating The Spirit Squad in handicap matches at Vengeance and a clean sweep in an elimination handicap match at Saturday Night's Main Event XXXIII.

During their feud with DX and their alignment with McMahon, the team also wrestled other teams in Raw's tag division over their World Tag Team Championship. The group successfully defended the tag team championship against the teams of Jim Duggan and Eugene, Charlie Haas and Viscera, and Snitsky and Val Venis. They then entered a lengthy feud with The Highlanders, whom they eventually defeated to retain the title at Unforgiven.

The Spirit Squad as a whole later began a losing streak with separate members losing singles matches to Ric Flair on consecutive episodes of Raw. After two consecutive losses to the debuting Cryme Tyme, Kenny attacked Mikey on the October 23 episode of Raw and announced that he was going to defeat Flair. Kenny was successful, despite Flair attempting to even the odds by bringing other WWE Legends, Dusty Rhodes, Sgt. Slaughter, and "Rowdy" Roddy Piper, to the ring with him. It was then announced that Flair and a legend, selected by interactive voting, would wrestle the team for the World Tag Team Championship at the Cyber Sunday pay-per-view in early November. The fans chose Piper, and he and Flair defeated Kenny and Mikey to win the championship.

The group was "killed off" on the November 27 Raw after they were defeated in a five-on-three match by Flair and DX. Later that night, in a backstage segment, DX placed all members into a crate stamped "OVW, Louisville, Kentucky", a reference to the developmental territory from which the Spirit Squad had come.

Mitchell was released from his WWE contract on May 15, 2007. He subsequently retired from professional wrestling.

=== Tomahawk Professional Wrestling (2022) ===
After over 15 years of retirement, Mitchell returned to professional wrestling for one night on September 17, 2022, losing to Lou Gotti in a bout for Tomahawk Professional Wrestling in Lufkin, Texas.

== Mixed martial arts ==
After being released by WWE, Mitchell began training for a career in mixed martial arts (MMA) under Rocky Long, a former mixed martial artist. He made his MMA debut on April 9, 2010, losing to future UFC star Derrick Lewis via second round technical knockout. Mitchell was set to fight again on December 11, 2010, but pulled out at the last minute due to an injury.

== Personal life ==
In 2006, Mitchell began a relationship with Torrie Wilson. In 2007, the couple started a business together called "Officially Jaded", a fashion boutique. Their relationship ended in 2011.

As a professional wrestler, Mitchell suffered numerous injuries, including damaging a disc in his neck and injuring his knee, as well as breaking his nose three times within one month.

== Mixed martial arts record ==
Professional record breakdown
1 match	0 wins	1 loss
By knockout	0	1

Res.	Record	Opponent	Method	Event	Date	Round	Time	Location	Notes
Loss	0–1	Derrick Lewis	TKO (punches)	WG-Worldwide Gladiator	April 9, 2010	2	1:33	Pasadena, Texas, United States	

== Championships and accomplishments ==
- Pro Wrestling Illustrated
  - Ranked 201 of the top 500 singles wrestlers in the PWI 500 in 2006
- World Wrestling Entertainment
  - World Tag Team Championship (1 time) – with Johnny, Kenny, Mikey, and Nicky^{[a]}

^{a} Mitch defended the championship with either Johnny, Kenny, Mikey, or Nicky under the Freebird Rule.
