= Kenny Dykstra =

American professional wrestler (born 1986)

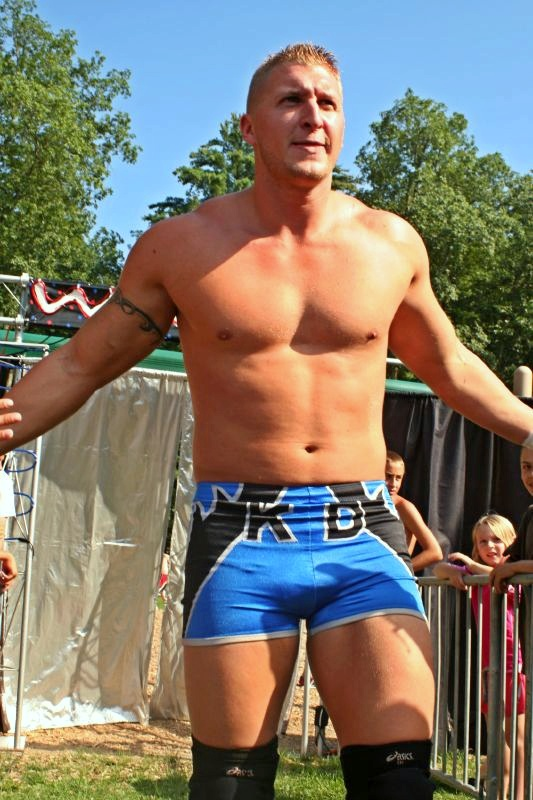
- Doane in 2009

Personal information
- Born: Kenneth George Doane; March 16, 1986 (age 40) Southbridge, Massachusetts, U.S.
- Education: Nichols College

Professional wrestling career
- Ring name(s): Ken Doane; Kenn Doane; Kenny; Kenny Dykstra "Simply" Stan Shooter; Ken Phoenix
- Billed height: 6 ft 2 in (1.88 m)
- Billed weight: 230 lb (100 kg)
- Billed from: Worcester, Massachusetts
- Trained by: Killer Kowalski; Ohio Valley Wrestling
- Debut: 2001
- Retired: April 20, 2021

Kenneth George Doane (born March 16, 1986) is an American retired professional wrestler. He is signed to WWE, where he works as a producer, as well as a trainer at the WWE Performance Center. During his time in WWE as a wrestler, he was known as Kenny Dykstra, and previously went by the mononym of Kenny as a member of the Spirit Squad faction.

Doane was trained by Killer Kowalski and made his wrestling debut at the age of fifteen in 2001. He began working for Ohio Valley Wrestling (OVW), per WWE request. In May 2003, Doane made his WWE television debut as "Ken Phoenix". During his time in OVW, he won the Television Championship once. After losing the title, Doane became part of The Spirit Squad faction. The team debuted on Raw in January 2006 and won the World Tag Team Championship three months later. Following the Spirit Squad's dissolution, he began working under the name of "Kenny Dykstra", before being released from his WWE contract in November 2008. He later began working on the independent circuit, wrestling for promotions including Dragon Gate USA and Evolve.

Following his retirement from in-ring action, Doane would end up working as a WWE producer and would coach on the side in 2021.

== Professional wrestling career ==
=== Early career (2001–2005) ===
Doane made his professional wrestling debut in 2001 at the age of fifteen. He started his professional wrestling career in the New England area under the name "Broadway" Kenn Phoenix. He was later trained by professional wrestler and trainer Killer Kowalski in Malden, Massachusetts. After being contacted by World Wrestling Entertainment (WWE), he was asked to make appearances for their developmental territory Ohio Valley Wrestling (OVW). Doane made his first national television appearance in WWE at the age of 17 on the May 12, 2003 episode of WWE Raw as Ken Phoenix. Along with his brother, Mike Phoenix, he was a participant in Rodney Mack's ongoing "5-Minute White Boy Challenge" where Mack defeated Caucasian wrestlers in under five minutes. Mack defeated the pair in 1:31, forcing them both to submit to his new Blackout finishing hold. He made another appearance, losing to Lance Storm on an episode of Sunday Night Heat before being officially signed to a developmental deal and to OVW full-time on June 4, 2004. On June 3, 2005, Doane had his first match, at the promotion, against Kenzo Suzuki, whom Doane defeated. Three weeks later, on June 25, 2005, he won the Television Championship from Deuce Shade. He had successful title defenses, but Doane lost the title to CM Punk on November 9, 2005.

=== World Wrestling Entertainment/WWE (2006-2008) ===
==== The Spirit Squad (2006) ====
After losing the Television Championship, Doane became a part of the Spirit Squad, a faction using the in-ring personas of male cheerleaders, using the name "Kenny". On the January 23, 2006, episode of Raw, the group helped Jonathan Coachman win a Royal Rumble qualifying match against Jerry "The King" Lawler by performing cheers for Coachman and distracting Lawler. They later became a part of the ongoing scripted feud between WWE chairman Vince McMahon and Shawn Michaels. The villainous McMahon brought in the Spirit Squad to attack Michaels on numerous occasions, including placing them in multiple handicap matches.

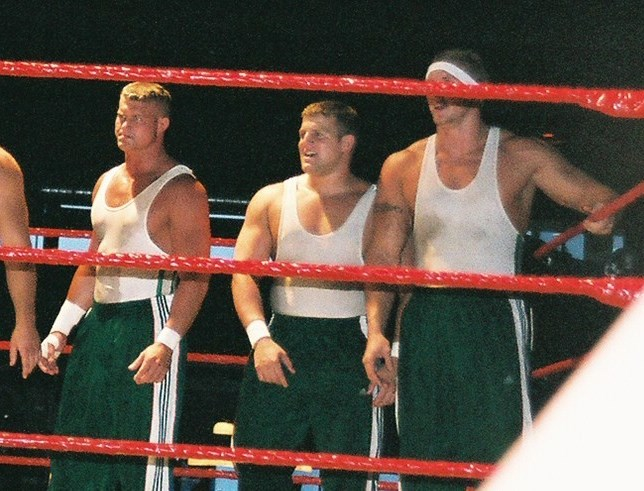
Members of the Spirit Squad in the ring, including Kenny on the right

They also continued wrestling in the tag team division, and on April 3, on Raw, the Spirit Squad won the World Tag Team Championship when Kenny and Mikey, with outside help from the other three Spirit Squad members, defeated the team of Big Show and Kane. After winning the championship, all five members of the team were recognized as the champions, allowing any combination of them to defend the championship. Also, Kenny became the second youngest wrestler to win a title in WWE after Rene Dupree, at the age of 20 years and 18 days; he was surpassed by Tyler Bate in 2017.

Three weeks later, McMahon scheduled another handicap match, with the Spirit Squad facing Michaels. The match never started, however; instead the Spirit Squad brutally beat down Michaels, ripping apart his ring attire and, as part of the storyline, shattered his knee with a chair. McMahon then called Triple H to the ring to attack Michaels with a sledgehammer; however, Kenny snatched the sledgehammer away from him, disrespecting Triple H, which led to him attacking the group. Triple H and Michaels revived their former team, D-Generation X (DX), and began a feud with the Spirit Squad. DX played various sophomoric pranks on the team and the McMahons (Vince and his son Shane), as well as defeating the Spirit Squad in handicap tag team matches at Vengeance and a clean sweep in an elimination handicap match at Saturday Night's Main Event XXXIII.

At the same time as their feud with DX and their alignment with McMahon, the team also wrestled other teams in Raw's tag division over the World Tag Team Championship. The group successfully defended the tag team championship against the teams of Jim Duggan and Eugene, Charlie Haas and Viscera, and Snitsky and Val Venis. They then entered a lengthy feud with The Highlanders, whom they eventually defeated to retain the title at Unforgiven.

The Spirit Squad as a whole later began a losing streak with separate members losing singles matches to Ric Flair on consecutive episodes of Raw. After two consecutive losses to the debuting Cryme Tyme, Kenny attacked Mikey on the October 23 episode of Raw, and announced that he was going to defeat Flair. Kenny was successful, despite Flair attempting to even the odds by bringing other WWE Legends (Dusty Rhodes, Sgt. Slaughter, and "Rowdy" Roddy Piper) to the ring with him. It was then announced that Flair and a legend, selected by interactive voting, would wrestle the team for the World Tag Team Championship at the Cyber Sunday pay-per-view in early November. The fans chose Piper, and he and Flair defeated Kenny and Mikey to win the championship.

The group disbanded on the November 27 Raw after losing a five-on-three match against Flair and DX. Later that night, DX placed all five members into a crate stamped "OVW, Louisville, Kentucky", a reference to the developmental territory from which the Spirit Squad had come.

==== Singles competition (2006–2008) ====
After the breakup of the Spirit Squad, he was repackaged as Kenny Dykstra – an homage to baseball player Lenny Dykstra – with new attire and entrance music. He became interested in joining the group Rated-RKO, which consisted of Edge and Randy Orton. In order to join, he was told to prove himself first. He continued the feud with Ric Flair, managing to pick up three straight victories (including at New Year's Revolution) before finally losing to him on the January 15, 2007, episode of Raw. Dykstra competed in the 2007 Royal Rumble match and got eliminated by Edge. After his feud with Flair, Dykstra became a mainstay on Raw's sister show Heat, having feuds with both Eugene and Val Venis.

He then formed a tag team with Johnny Nitro, but the duo split when Dykstra was drafted to the SmackDown! brand on June 17, 2007, as part of the WWE Supplemental Draft.

Dykstra made his debut on the July 6 episode of SmackDown! in a losing effort to the re-debuting Chuck Palumbo. On the July 20 episode of SmackDown!, Dykstra participated in a 20-man battle royal for the World Heavyweight Championship and was eliminated by Chris Masters; later on that evening, he lost to Matt Hardy in singles competition.

Dykstra formed an on-screen relationship with Victoria on the July 27 episode of SmackDown!. The two teamed together in mixed tag team matches, usually against Jimmy Wang Yang and Torrie Wilson or Chuck Palumbo and Michelle McCool. They also regularly accompanied each other to the ring for matches. After a leave of absence from television in the first half of 2008, Dykstra made his return on the August 15 episode of SmackDown, losing to WWE Champion Triple H. On November 10, 2008, WWE announced Doane had been released from his contract.

=== Various promotions and later retirement (2009–2021) ===
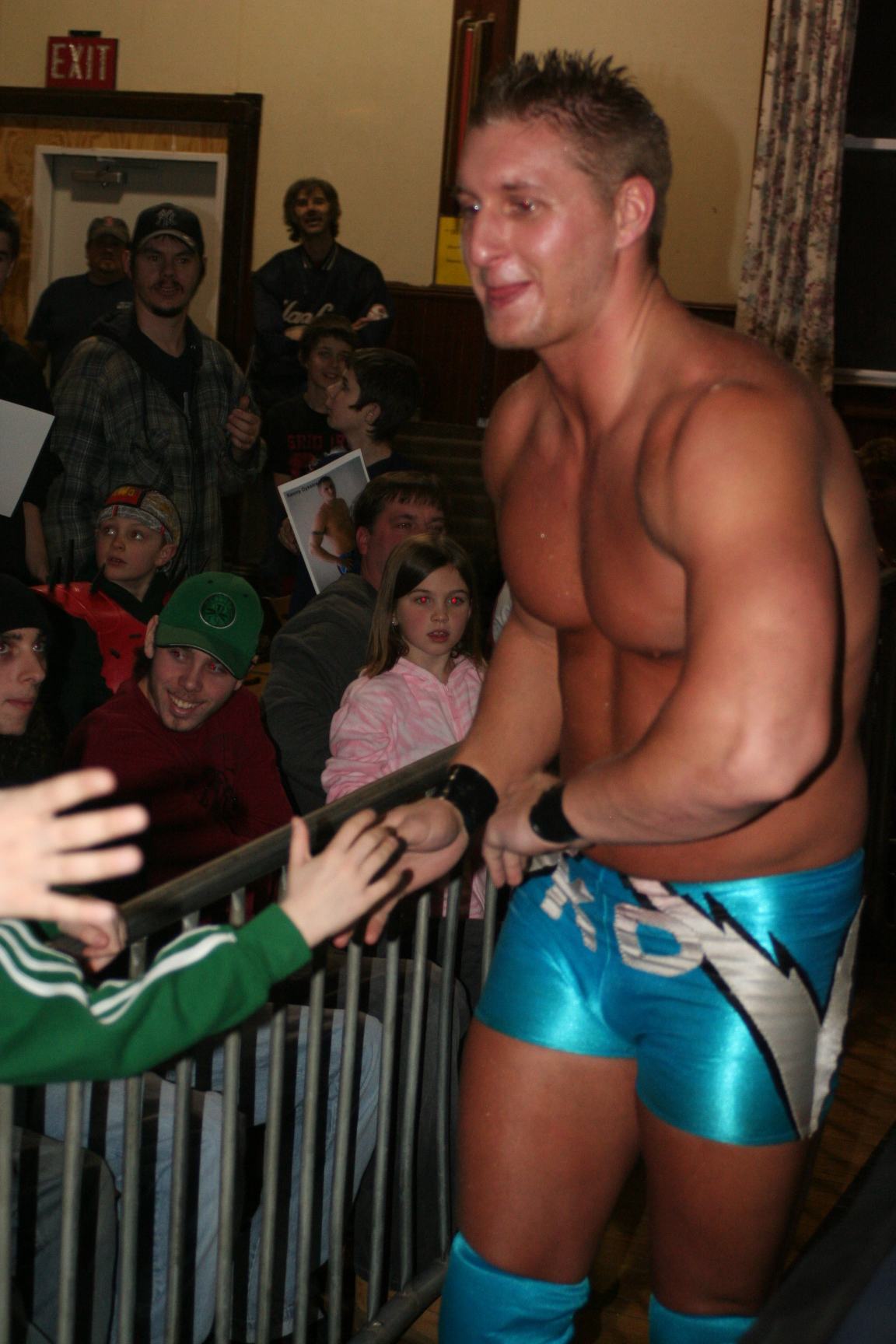
Doane in 2010

In 2009, Doane began working for Dragon Gate USA under his real name. On December 3, 2009, it was announced that Doane would be joining recently opened promotion Evolve as Kenn Doane. He debuted at the promotions first show on January 16, 2010, in a loss to Jimmy Jacobs.

On March 9, 2010, Doane, under his real name, wrestled in a tryout dark match for Total Nonstop Action Wrestling, losing to Homicide. On November 15, 2011, Doane wrestled a dark match for WWE at the SmackDown tapings in Bridgeport, Connecticut, losing to Justin Gabriel. In September 2014, Doane took part in Chikara's 2014 King of Trios tournament, using his Spirit Squad character and teaming with Johnny and Mikey. After a win over Sinn Bodhi and the Odditorium (Qefka the Quiet and Sir Oliver Grimsly) on September 19, the Spirit Squad was eliminated from the tournament in the second round on September 20 by the Golden Trio (Dasher Hatfield, Icarus, and Mark Angelosetti).

On November 12, 2016, wrestling as The Spirit Squad, Doane along with Mikey captured the NYWC Tag Team Championship from Hounds of Hatred (Boo and Bam Sullivan) at Firestorm 3. 15 days later, Spirit Squad lost the titles back to Hounds of Hatred. At Ring of Honor television tapings in April 2017, Kenny and Mikey unsuccessfully challenged The Young Bucks for the ROH World Tag Team Championship. On July 24, 2019, it was announced that Squad members Dykstra and Mike Mondo were now signed to Major League Wrestling (MLW). They would go on to debut at that month's Never Say Never show. On April 20, 2021, Doane announced his retirement from in-ring action, ending his 20-year career as a professional wrestler.

=== Return to WWE (2016) ===
In late 2016, Doane, as Kenny, and Mikey returned to WWE for a short storyline with Dolph Ziggler (formerly Nicky in the Spirit Squad). On October 4, on SmackDown, they utilised their Spirit Squad characters to taunt Ziggler about his time in the Spirit Squad, before attacking him at the behest of the Intercontinental Champion The Miz and Maryse. Five days later, at the No Mercy pay-per-view, he and Mikey tried to distract Ziggler in his career vs. title match under Maryse's command, but were unsuccessful in doing so. On the October 11 episode of SmackDown, Kenny and Mikey faced Ziggler in a two-on-one handicap match; Ziggler won but was then attacked by The Miz and saved by Rhyno and Heath Slater. Kenny and Mikey unsuccessfully challenged Slater and Rhyno for the WWE SmackDown Tag Team Championship on October 25. They appeared throughout November in tag team matches, before disappearing off television.

=== Second return to WWE (2021–present) ===
On October 6, 2021, Doane was reportedly rehired by WWE to work as a trainer at the WWE Performance Center. Two months later, he began working as a producer on Raw and SmackDown.

As a role of a producer, Doane is seen occasionally breaking up brawls between wrestlers such as restraining Kevin Owens who fought The Bloodline (The Usos and Solo Sikoa) on the January 16, 2023 episode of Raw as he was among the officials separating those men.

Chelsea Green mentioned on the Busted Open Radio Podcast, that Doane is one of the crucial producers to help assist her advance her character.

== Other media ==
Doane appeared on Seducing Cindy, a Fox Reality series that follows Cindy Margolis, once the most downloaded woman on the Internet, as she searches for a new love. The program premiered on January 30, 2010. Doane made it to the final five, one episode away from the season finale, but was eliminated.

In 2013, while rehabbing a knee injury, Doane penned his first children's book entitled Billy's Bully. The book was released in June 2013.

== Personal life ==
Doane was born to Ken and Vickie Doane in Southbridge, Massachusetts. His parents were supportive of his decision in becoming a professional wrestler. He has an older brother named Mike. Doane attended Bay Path Regional Vocational Technical High School in Charlton, Massachusetts and Nichols College in Dudley, Massachusetts.

Doane was formerly engaged to fellow professional wrestler Mickie James.

In 2012, Doane enrolled in Nichols College where he started playing football. He played as a tight end and linebacker.

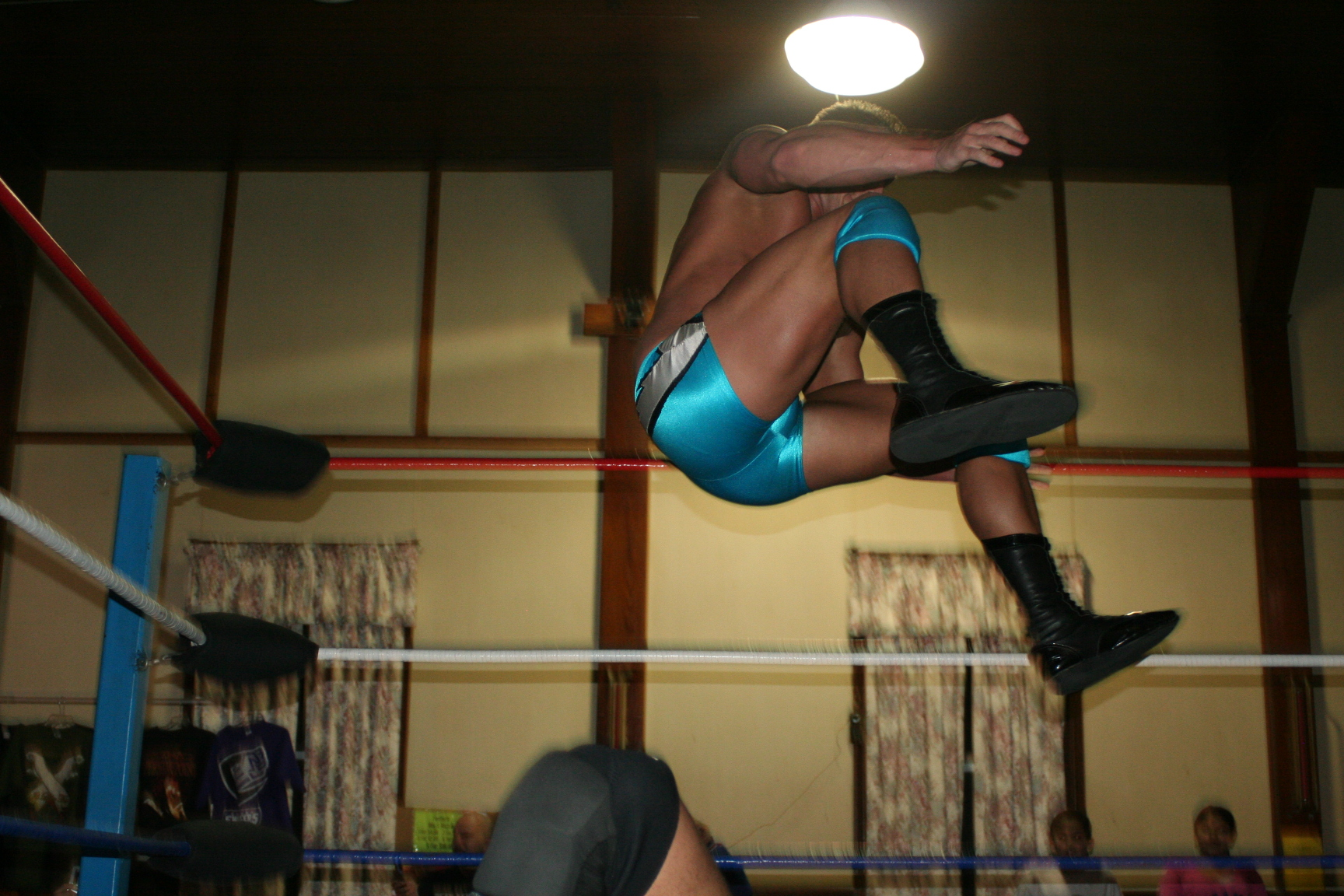
Doane performing his "Sky High Leg Drop" (a High-angle diving leg drop)

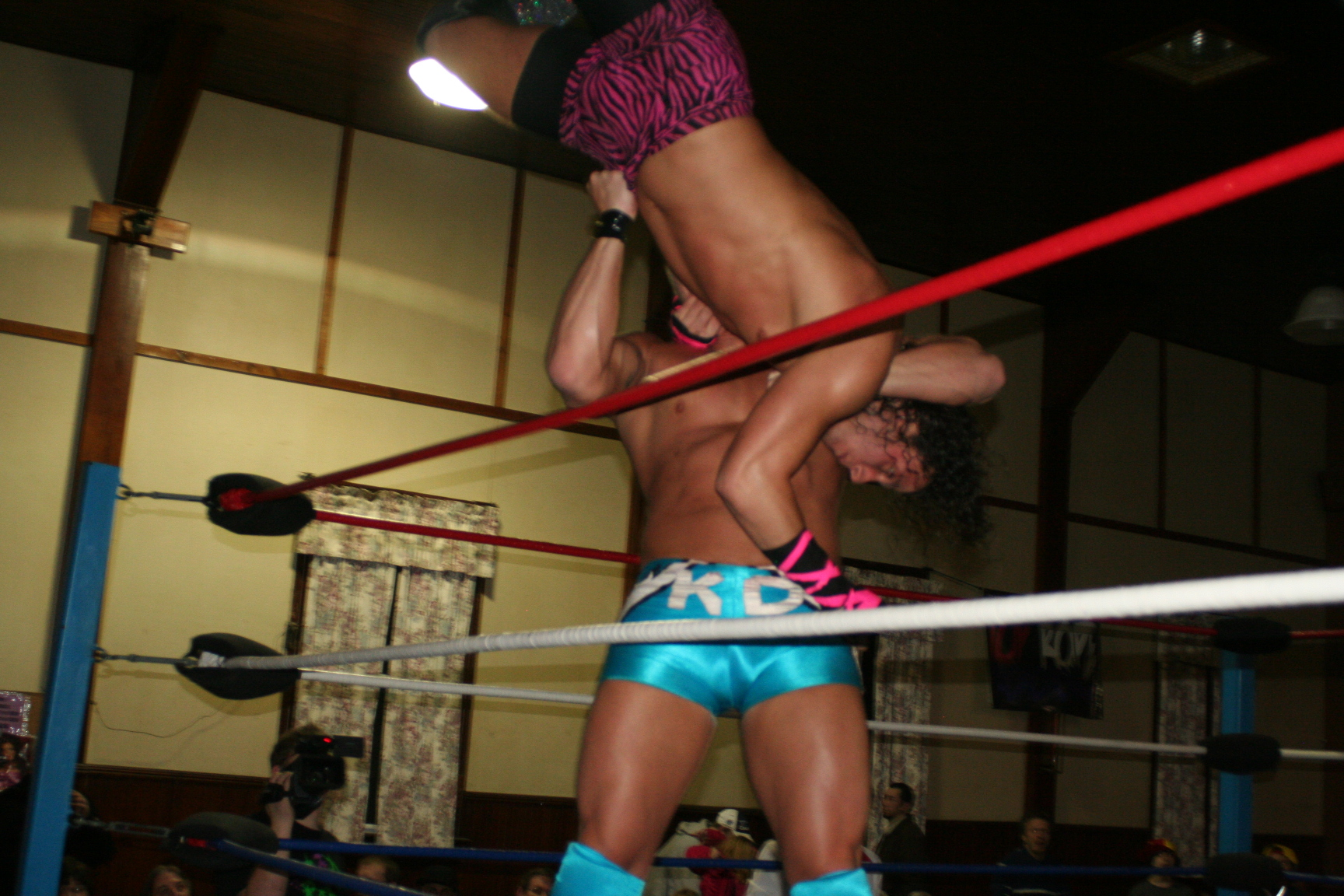
Doane performing a suplex.

== Championships and accomplishments ==
- Compound Pro Wrestling
  - ComPro Tag Team Championship (1 time) – with Mikey
- Independent Connecticut Championship Wrestling
  - ICCW Tag Team Championship (1 time) – with Kid Krazy
- New York Wrestling Connection
  - NYWC Tag Team Championship (1 time) – with Mikey
- Ohio Valley Wrestling
  - OVW Television Championship (1 time)
- Premiere Wrestling Federation Northeast
  - PWF-NE Tag Team Championship (2 times) – with Johnny Curtis
- Preston City Wrestling
  - PCW Tag Team Championship (1 time) – with Mikey
- Pro Wrestling Illustrated
  - Ranked 123 of the top 500 singles wrestlers in PWI 500 in 2007
- World Wrestling Entertainment
  - World Tag Team Championship (1 time) – with Johnny, Mikey, Mitch and Nicky^{[a]}
- Xtreme Wrestling Alliance
  - XWA Heavyweight Championship (1 time)

== Notes ==
^{a} Kenny defended the championship with either Johnny, Mitch, Nicky, or Mikey under the Freebird Rule.
