= Johnny Jeter =

American professional wrestler (born 1981)

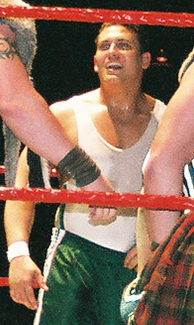
- Jeter in 2006

Personal information
- Born: John Jeter; December 14, 1981 (age 44) San Diego, California, U.S.
- Education: California State University

Professional wrestling career
- Ring name(s): Conquistador Dos; Jayden Jeter; Johnny; Johnny Jeter
- Billed height: 6 ft 0 in (1.83 m)
- Billed weight: 218 lb (99 kg)
- Trained by: Nick Dinsmore
- Debut: 2002
- Retired: 2019

John Jeter (born December 14, 1981) is an American professional wrestler. He is best known for his appearances with World Wrestling Entertainment (WWE) in 2006 as Johnny, a member of The Spirit Squad.

Jeter was trained by Nick Dinsmore (also known as Eugene), and made his wrestling debut in 2001. He began working for Ohio Valley Wrestling (OVW), which led to him signing a developmental contract with WWE in 2003. Alongside Matt Cappotelli, he won the OVW Southern Tag Team Championship, and also won the OVW Heavyweight Championship in singles competition. Jeter became part of the Spirit Squad and debuted on Raw in January 2006. They won the World Tag Team Championship once. After being released from WWE, he returned to OVW. He retired, but returned to the ring in 2019.

== Professional wrestling career ==
=== Early career (2001–2003) ===
After being trained by Nick Dinsmore, Jeter debuted in 2001, and began working for Ohio Valley Wrestling (OVW).

=== World Wrestling Entertainment (2003-2008) ===
==== Ohio Valley Wrestling (2003–2005) ====
In 2003, Jeter signed a contract with World Wrestling Entertainment (WWE), and continued to wrestle in OVW, which was WWE's developmental territory, although he occasionally made appearances in dark matches for WWE. In one of his earliest dark matches, Jeter teamed with Nova in a loss to Chuck Palumbo and Nunzio on the February 23, 2003 episode of Velocity. His pay-per-view debut was at the 2003 Vengeance event, when Jeter appeared as the masked Conquistador #2 in the APA's Barroom Brawl match.

In 2004, Jeter formed a tag team with Matt Cappotelli known as the Thrillseekers. The Thrillseekers wrestled in several dark matches before both Raw and SmackDown, defeating the teams of Johnny Nitro and Chris Cage, and MNM. On January 19, 2005, The Thrillseekers defeated MNM to win the OVW Southern Tag Team Championship. They successfully defended the championship against MNM and The Heart Throbs, before losing it to the Blond Bombers (Tank and Chad Toland) on April 6.

On July 27, The Thrillseekers defeated MNM to become the number one contenders to the Tag Team Championship, in a match with the added stipulation that whoever gained the pin would receive a match for the OVW Heavyweight Championship. The Thrillseekers got simultaneous pins, but it was Jeter who received the championship match. On August 3, Jeter defeated the OVW Heavyweight Champion, Brent Albright, to win the championship, after Ken Anderson and Daniel Puder interfered on his behalf. After the match, Jeter turned into a heel (villainous character) by attacking Cappotelli, who had suffered an injury. In the following weeks, Jeter also attacked Albright, announcer Dean Hill, and official Danny Davis.

Jeter quickly formed an alliance with Ken Anderson, who helped him retain the championship on several occasions. They later added Paul Burchill to the alliance as an enforcer. After holding the OVW Heavyweight Championship for five months, Jeter lost it to Cappotelli in a two out of three falls match on November 9, 2005. Jeter challenged Cappotelli on numerous occasions Cappotelli in an attempt to regain the championship, but was unsuccessful.

==== The Spirit Squad (2006) ====
In OVW, he became a part of The Spirit Squad, a faction using the in-ring personas of male cheerleaders, using the name "Johnny". On January 23, 2006, they had their WWE television debut as a group, appearing on Raw and helping Jonathan Coachman win a Royal Rumble qualifying match against Jerry Lawler by distracting Lawler and performing cheers for Coachman. They later became a part of the ongoing scripted feud between WWE chairman Vince McMahon and Shawn Michaels. The heel (villainous) McMahon brought in The Spirit Squad to attack Michaels on numerous occasions, including placing them in multiple handicap matches.

They also wrestled in the tag team division and on Raw on April 3, The Spirit Squad won the World Tag Team Championship when Kenny and Mikey, with outside help from the other three members, defeated Kane and The Big Show. After winning the championship, all five members of The Spirit Squad were recognized as the champions, allowing any combination of them to defend the championship.

In May, McMahon signed another handicap match, with The Spirit Squad facing Michaels. The Spirit Squad instead attacked Michaels before the match started, and Triple H came out to help The Spirit Squad. Triple H felt disrespected by The Spirit Squad however, and as a result, helped Michaels instead. This led to Triple H and Michaels reforming D-Generation X (DX) and they began a feud with The Spirit Squad. DX played various sophomoric jokes on The Spirit Squad and the McMahons, as well as defeating The Spirit Squad in handicap tag team matches at Vengeance and a clean sweep in an elimination handicap match at Saturday Night's Main Event XXXIII.

At the same time as their feud with DX and their alignment with McMahon, The Spirit Squad also wrestled other teams in Raw's tag division over their World Tag Team Championship, successfully defending the championship against the teams of Jim Duggan and Eugene, Charlie Haas and Viscera, and Snitsky and Val Venis. They then entered a lengthy feud with The Highlanders, whom they eventually defeated to retain the championship at the Unforgiven pay-per-view in September. The Spirit Squad as a whole later began a losing streak with Johnny, Mikey, and Mitch losing singles matches to Ric Flair on consecutive episodes of Raw. After two consecutive losses to the debuting Cryme Tyme, Kenny announced that he was going to defeat Flair, and was successful with the help of the other members. It was then announced that Flair and a legend, selected by interactive voting, would wrestle the team for the World Tag Team Championship at the Cyber Sunday pay-per-view in early November. The fans chose Roddy Piper, and he and Flair defeated Kenny and Mikey to win the championship.

The group disbanded on the November 27 episode of Raw, when they were defeated in a five-on-three handicap match by DX and Flair. In a backstage segment later that night, DX placed all members into a crate stamped "OVW, Louisville, Kentucky", a reference to the developmental territory from where The Spirit Squad had come.

Following the breakup of The Spirit Squad, Johnny became the second member of the team to return to the main roster when he appeared during a 30-man battle royal on the December 18 episode of Raw, wearing new wrestling attire.

==== Return to OVW (2007–2008) ====
Jeter made his return to OVW on February 14, 2007, by defeating Deuce in a dark match prior to the television tapings. In May 2007, Jeter challenged Shawn Spears for the OVW Television Championship, but was unsuccessful. In June, he formed a team with Seth Skyfire, before returning to competing in the singles division. He challenged Paul Burchill for the OVW Heavyweight Championship in mid-2008, but was unsuccessful.

Beginning in August, Jeter made numerous appearances in dark matches prior to Raw and SmackDown!. He also wrestled at ECW live events. Beginning with the October 17, 2007 live event in Manchester, England, Jeter changed his ring name to "Jayden Jeter". In June 2008, it was revealed that Jeter had been quietly released from his contract before January 2008. In 2019, Jeter clarified that he left WWE on his own terms, rather than being released, after having to overcome the addiction to painkillers.

=== Chikara (2014) ===
In September 2014, Jeter broke his retirement to participate in the Chikara promotion's 2014 King of Trios tournament, wrestling as "Johnny" and teaming with his former Spirit Squad stablemates Kenny and Mikey. After a win over Sinn Bodhi and the Odditorium (Qefka the Quiet and Sir Oliver Grimsly) on September 19, the Spirit Squad was eliminated from the tournament in the second round on September 20 by the Golden Trio (Dasher Hatfield, Icarus and Mark Angelosetti). Following the tournament, Jeter returned to retirement.

=== Championship Wrestling from Arizona (2019) ===
In early-2019, Jeter broke his retirement once again, beginning making appearances with Championship Wrestling from Arizona (CWFA).

== Personal life ==
Following his initial retirement in 2008, Jeter went back to college to study accounting at California State University, Northridge. Jeter has since earned his Bachelor of Science in Professional Accountancy and works in Internal Audit.

== Championships and accomplishments ==
- Ohio Valley Wrestling
  - OVW Heavyweight Championship (2 times)
  - OVW Southern Tag Team Championship (1 time) – with Matt Cappotelli
- Pro Wrestling Illustrated
  - Ranked No. 70 of the top 500 singles wrestlers in the PWI 500 in 2004
- World Wrestling Entertainment
  - World Tag Team Championship (1 time)^{[a]} – with Kenny, Mikey, Mitch, and Nicky

^{a} Johnny defended the championship with either Kenny, Mitch, Nicky, or Mikey under the Freebird Rule.
