= Spirit Squad =

Professional wrestling stable

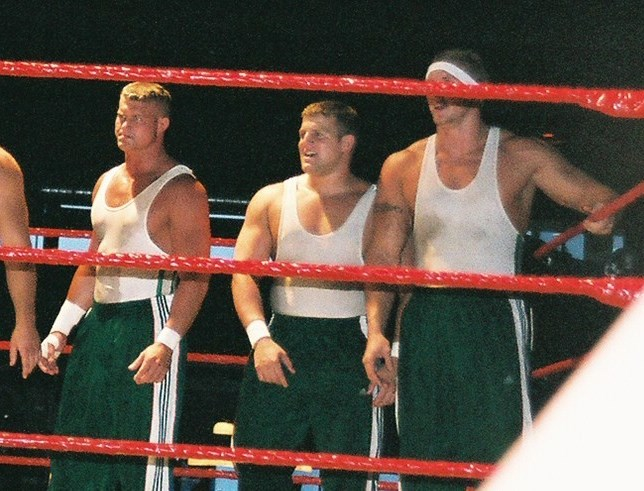
- Nicky, Mikey, and Kenny in the ring in 2006

Stable
- Members: Kenny; Johnny; Mitch; Nicky; Mikey
- Name(s): The Spirit Squad; The Squad; Squad World Order
- Billed heights: Kenny: 6 ft 4 in (1.93 m); Johnny: 6 ft 0 in (1.83 m); Mitch: 6 ft 2 in (1.88 m); Nicky: 6 ft 0 in (1.83 m); Mikey: 5 ft 6 in (1.68 m)
- Debut: January 23, 2006
- Years active: 2006; 2009; 2014–2019

The Spirit Squad was an American professional wrestling stable in World Wrestling Entertainment (WWE) consisting of Kenny, Johnny, Mitch, Nicky, and Mikey. The team's ring personas were those of an all-male cheerleading squad.

Before forming the group, all members competed in OVW, WWE's developmental territory, where they were once opponents. In January 2006, the Spirit Squad made their television debut on the Raw brand. Three months later, the team won the World Tag Team Championship and, by "executive decision", were all collectively recognized as champions and internally decided which two defended the championship at any given time. Their reign marked the first time five wrestlers had been simultaneously recognized as World Tag Team Champions.

After losing the tag team championship in November 2006, the team disbanded. Kenny remained on WWE television regularly, Nicky, Mikey and Johnny returned to OVW, and Mitch was released from his WWE contract in May 2007.

By 2009, Nicky would be repackaged as Dolph Ziggler and the rest of the group was released from WWE. From 2016 to 2019, Kenny and Mikey reunited as a duo and made appearances for WWE, Major League Wrestling (MLW), and the independent circuit. In 2021, Kenny returned to WWE as a trainer and Nicky was released in 2023.

== Concept ==
The idea for the Spirit Squad came directly from WWE chairman Vince McMahon. Originally, the group was scheduled to be made up of four wrestlers from WWE's developmental territory Ohio Valley Wrestling (OVW); Ken Doane, Nick Mitchell, Nick Nemeth and Elijah Burke. Burke, however, turned down McMahon's offer to join the Spirit Squad, feeling that he could not perform the acrobatics required from members of the group, and chose to remain in OVW. Burke was replaced in the Spirit Squad by Johnny Jeter and Mike Mondo. The five members were given new ring names Kenny, Johnny, Mitch, Nicky and Mikey.

== History ==
=== World Wrestling Entertainment / WWE (2006–2008, 2016) ===
==== Formation (2006–2007) ====
The Spirit Squad made their first appearances in WWE at house shows and in dark matches. On January 23, 2006, they had their television debut, when they appeared on Raw and helped Jonathan Coachman win a Royal Rumble qualifying match against Jerry "The King" Lawler by performing cheers for Coachman and distracting Lawler. In subsequent weeks, the team was hired by several wrestlers to perform cheers for them.

They eventually became a part of the ongoing scripted feud between WWE chairman Vince McMahon and Shawn Michaels. The villainous McMahon ordered the Spirit Squad to perform disrespectful cheers about Michaels, attack him on numerous occasions, and face him in multiple handicap matches.

While involved in the Michaels-McMahon feud, they also continued wrestling in the tag team division, and on the April 3 episode of Raw, won the World Tag Team Championship when Kenny and Mikey – with outside help from the other three Spirit Squad members – defeated Big Show and Kane. After winning the championship, an "executive edict" was declared stating that all five members were recognized as the champions, with any two members allowed to defend the championship at once under the Freebird Rule.

On May 1, the night after the Backlash pay-per-view, the five members of the Spirit Squad were jointly named "Co-General Managers" of Raw. During the night, after drawing "spirit straws", they placed Kenny into a title match with WWE Champion John Cena. Before the match they ordered play-by-play analyst Joey Styles in their office to instruct him on how to call Kenny's upcoming win (which never did come to pass), instructing him to do it "with spirit" or they would force him to call all of the following Raw episodes while wearing a female cheerleading uniform. This led to Styles confronting color commentator Jerry Lawler and eventually quitting the show in a worked shoot promo. Kenny lost the match after special referee Triple H, who was conspiring with the Spirit Squad, walked out on the match.

Three weeks later, on Raw, Vince McMahon signed another handicap match pitting the Spirit Squad against Shawn Michaels. The match never started, however, because the Spirit Squad attacked Michaels, ripping apart his ring attire and, in storyline, shattering his knee with a steel chair. McMahon then called Triple H to the ring to attack Michaels with a sledgehammer, however, Kenny snatched the sledgehammer away, disrespecting Triple H, which led to him attacking the group.

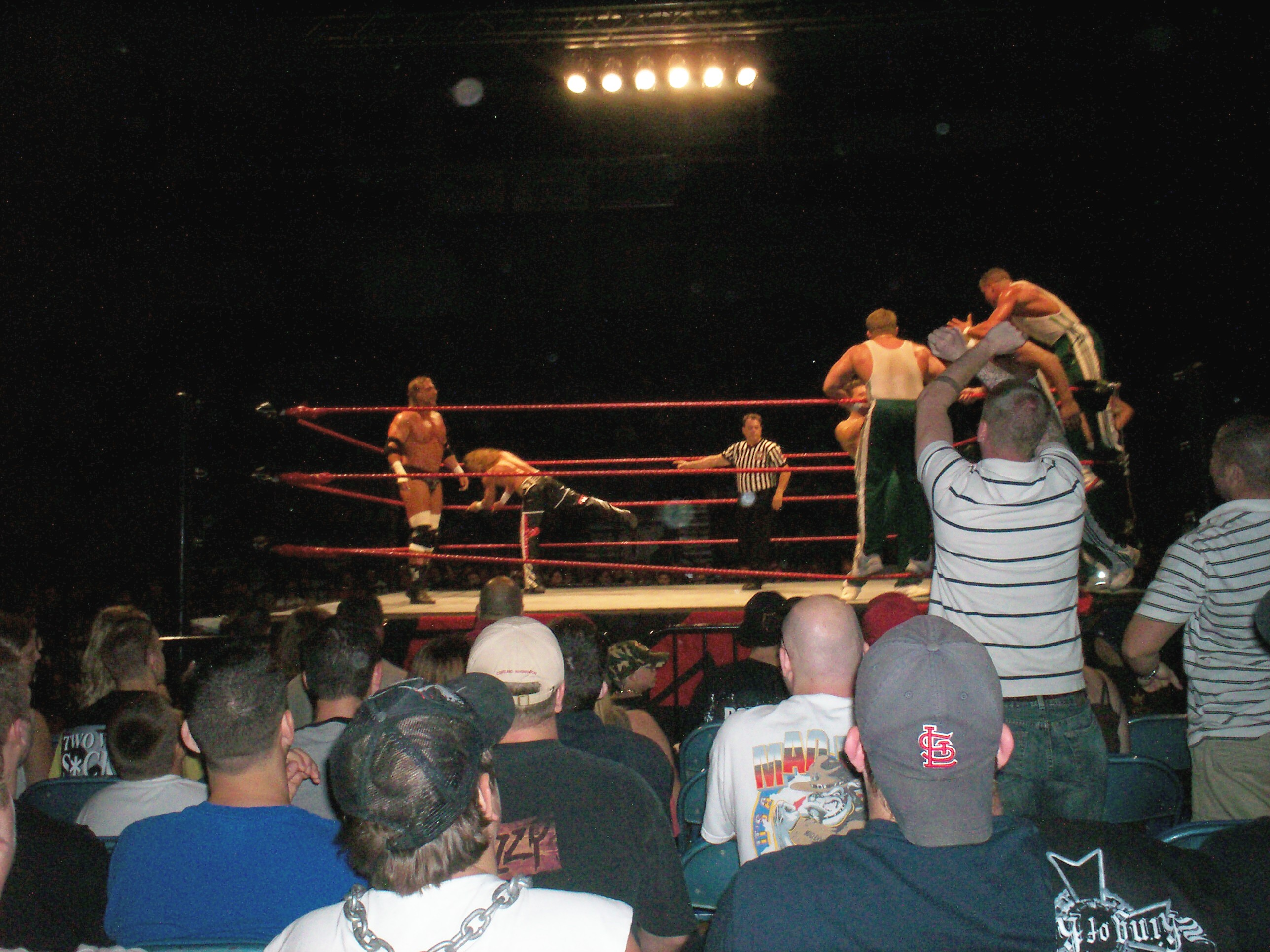
The Spirit Squad wrestling against D-Generation X in a handicap match at a house show

Triple H and Shawn Michaels revived D-Generation X (DX) when Michaels ran to the ring to aid Triple H in a 5-on-1 gauntlet match against the Spirit Squad (ambushing Mitch before he could enter it) and as a team began a feud with the Spirit Squad. DX played various sophomoric pranks on the Spirit Squad and the McMahons (Vince and his son Shane), including DX dumping green slime onto the group and embarrassing the team afterwards, by defeating them, and dumping feces on the Spirit Squad and the McMahons. DX defeated the Spirit Squad in handicap tag matches at Vengeance, and scoring a clean sweep in an elimination handicap match at Saturday Night's Main Event XXXIII.

At the same time as their feud with DX and their alignment with McMahon, the team also wrestled other teams in Raw's tag team division over their World Tag Team Championship. The Spirit Squad successfully defended the championship against the teams of Jim Duggan and Eugene, Charlie Haas and Viscera, and Snitsky and Val Venis before entering a lengthy feud with The Highlanders. They eventually defeated The Highlanders to retain the titles at the Unforgiven pay-per-view.

At the end of September and beginning of October the Spirit Squad as a whole began a losing streak, with separate members losing singles matches to Ric Flair on consecutive episodes of Raw. After Johnny and Mikey lost to the debuting Cryme Tyme on October 16, Kenny started yelling at the other members of the Spirit Squad in the ring and walked off shouting "I'm tired of losing". Tensions further escalated the following week, when the Spirit Squad lost to Cryme Tyme for the second consecutive week. After the defeat, Kenny attacked Mikey, then announced he would defeat Flair, since no other member of the group could do it. Later in the night he was successful, with help from the rest of the Spirit Squad, despite Flair bringing a number of fellow "Legends" (Dusty Rhodes, Sgt. Slaughter, and "Rowdy" Roddy Piper) to the ring with him to even the odds. It was then decided that Flair and one of those legends, of the fans choosing, would wrestle the Spirit Squad at Cyber Sunday for the World Tag Team Championship. At Cyber Sunday the fans chose Piper and he and Flair defeated Kenny and Mikey to win the titles. At the time of their loss the team had held the title for 216 days, the longest since the team of Owen Hart and The British Bulldog held it for 241 days in 1996 and 1997. At Survivor Series, The Spirit Squad (with Mitch) went on to face the legends consisting of captain Ric Flair, Sgt. Slaughter, Dusty Rhodes, and Ron Simmons (with Arn Anderson) in a losing effort.

==== Breakup and aftermath (2007–2008) ====
The group disbanded on the November 27 episode of Raw, when they were defeated in a five-on-three handicap match by DX and Flair. In a backstage segment later that night, DX placed all members into a crate stamped "OVW, Louisville, Kentucky", a reference to the developmental territory from which the Spirit Squad had come.

After the breakup, Kenny emerged as the only member to remain on WWE television, gaining the last name "Dykstra" and continuing the feud with Flair that led to the Spirit Squad's break up. At Ohio Valley Wrestling (OVW), Nicky and Mikey were repackaged as a tag team, called The Frat Pack. Johnny also returned to OVW after the breakup of the Spirit Squad, save for an appearance during a battle royal on an episode of Raw. Mitch was released from WWE on May 18, 2007, Johnny in the beginning of 2008, Mikey on June 13, 2008, and Kenny on November 10, 2008. In September 2008, Nicky was repackaged as Dolph Ziggler and has gone on to have success as a singles wrestler, having won the Intercontinental, United States, World Heavyweight and NXT Championships. His run would last until September 2023.

==== Feud with Dolph Ziggler (2016) ====
In late 2016, Mikey and Kenny returned to WWE for a short storyline with Dolph Ziggler (formerly Nicky in the Spirit Squad). On October 4, on SmackDown, they taunted Ziggler about his time in the Spirit Squad, before attacking him at the behest of the Intercontinental Champion The Miz and Maryse. Five days later, at the No Mercy pay-per-view, they attempted to distract Ziggler in his career vs. title match against The Miz, but were unsuccessful. On the October 11 episode of SmackDown, Mikey and Kenny faced Ziggler in a two-on-one handicap match; Ziggler won but was attacked by The Miz before being saved by Rhyno and Heath Slater. This led to a six-man tag team match the following week, which Mikey, Kenny, and The Miz won. Mikey and Kenny unsuccessfully challenged Slater and Rhyno for the WWE SmackDown Tag Team Championship on October 25. They appeared throughout November in tag team matches, before disappearing off television.

By 2021, Kenny would later return to the company as a trainer and producer for Raw and SmackDown brands.

=== Independent circuit (2009–2019) ===
On September 26, 2009, Kenny and Mitch reunited as the Spirit Squad in the National Wrestling Alliance's New Jersey territory in a match against Fire Power (Danny Inferno and Jim Powers) for the vacant NWA New Jersey Tag Team Championship but lost the match.

On August 21, 2014, the Chikara promotion announced that Johnny, Kenny, and Mikey would be reuniting as the Spirit Squad for the 2014 King of Trios tournament. After a win over Sinn Bodhi and the Odditorium (Qefka the Quiet and Sir Oliver Grimsly) on September 19, the Spirit Squad was eliminated from the tournament in the second round on September 20 by the Golden Trio (Dasher Hatfield, Icarus and Mark Angelosetti).

In 2016, Kenny and Mikey appeared for New York Wrestling Connection. On November 12, they captured the NYWC Tag Team Championship from Hounds of Hatred (Boo and Bam Sullivan) at Firestorm 3. 15 days later, Spirit Squad lost the titles back to Hounds of Hatred.

On February 26, 2017, Kenny and Mikey defeated the UK Hooligans and 2 mates Pissing Around to win the Preston City Wrestling's Tag Team championship.

On April 8, 2017, Kenny and Mikey answered The Young Bucks' open challenge for the Ring of Honor (ROH) World Tag Team Championship, losing the subsequent title match.

=== House of Hardcore (2016–2018) ===
At House of Hardcore 23, The Squad (Kenny & Mikey) made their House of Hardcore (HOH) debut, losing to Tommy Dreamer and The Sandman.

=== Major League Wrestling (2019) ===
On July 24, 2019, it was announced that Squad members Mike Mondo and Kenny Dykstra were now signed to Major League Wrestling (MLW). They would go on to debut at that months Never Say Never show. In MLW they are known as Doane and Mondo, the Spirit Squad. They wrestled on the pre-show main event to MLW Saturday Night SuperFight on November 2, 2019 in a 3 way tag match vs Contra Unit (Simon Gotch and Ikuro Kwon) and the team of Douglas James and Dominic Garrini. Contra Unit won the match by pinning Dykstra.

== Championships and accomplishments ==
- Compound Pro Wrestling
  - ComPro Tag Team Championship (1 time) – Kenny and Mikey
- New York Wrestling Connection
  - NYWC Tag Team Championship (1 time) – Kenny and Mikey
- Preston City Wrestling
  - PCW Tag Team Championship (1 time) – Kenny and Mikey
- World Wrestling Entertainment
  - World Tag Team Championship (1 time) – Johnny, Kenny, Mikey, Mitch and Nicky
