= Mike Mondo =

American professional wrestler (born 1983)

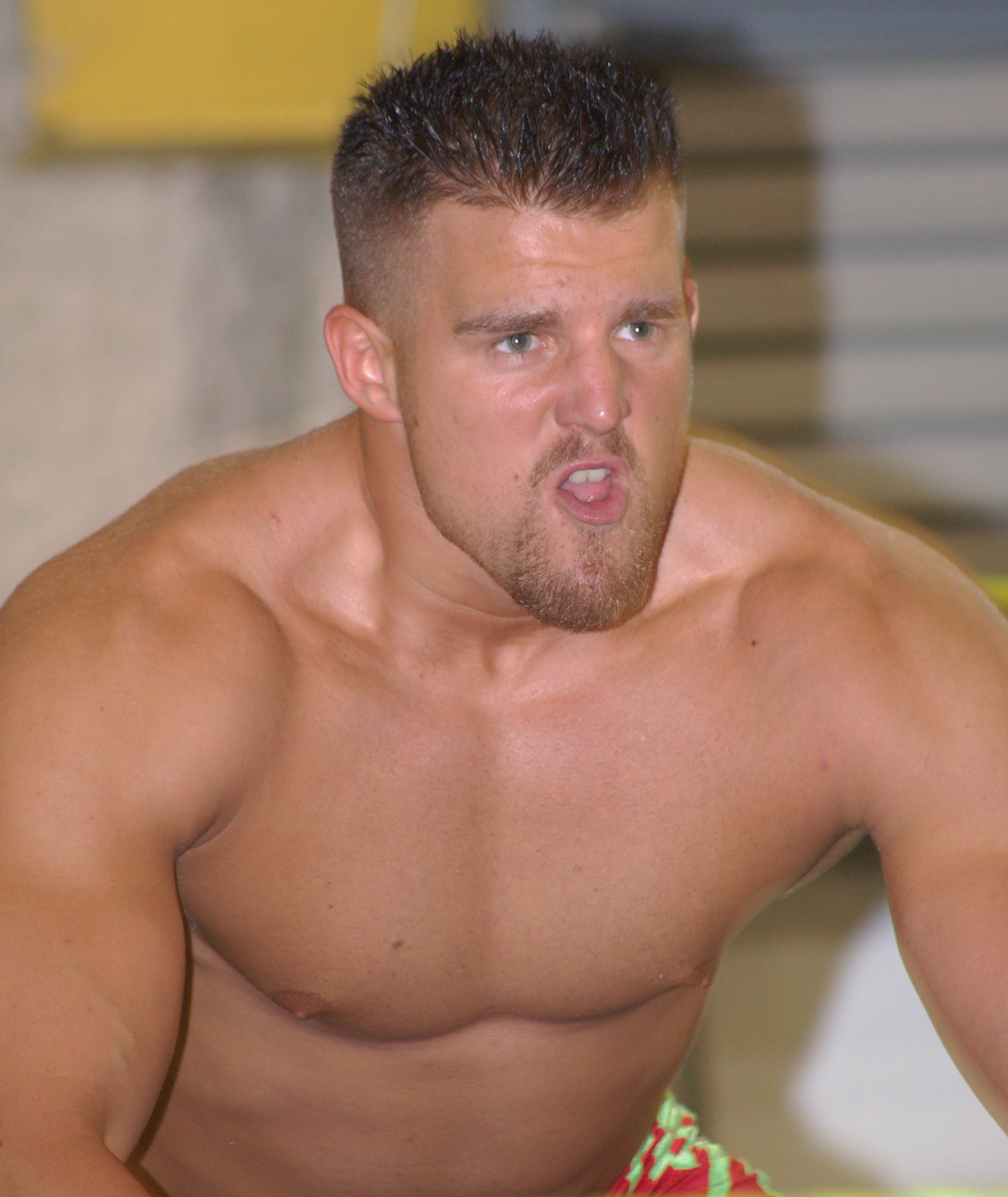
- Mondo in 2007

Personal information
- Born: Michael Brendli; March 26, 1983 (age 43) Patchogue, New York, U.S.

Professional wrestling career
- Ring name(s): El Mondo; Livewyre; Mike Mondo; Mikey
- Billed height: 5 ft 7 in (1.70 m)
- Billed weight: 229 lb (104 kg)
- Trained by: Critical Mass Wrestling School; Ohio Valley Wrestling
- Debut: 2002

Michael Brendli (born March 26, 1983), better known by the ring name Mike Mondo, is an American professional wrestler. He is currently performing on the independent circuit – predominantly for the National Wrestling Alliance (NWA), where he is the former one-time NWA National Heavyweight Champion. He is best known for his time in WWE as Mike Mondo and Mikey as a member of The Spirit Squad.

After training at the Critical Mass Wrestling School, he debuted in June 2002 and began working for several independent promotions as Mike Mondo, Livewyre, or El Livewyre. His earliest success came in the New York Wrestling Connection promotion, where he won the NYWC Heavyweight Championship on two occasions between 2003 and 2005. In February 2005, he signed a contract with WWE, and was assigned to the OVW developmental territory. There, he formed The Spirit Squad faction with four other wrestlers.

The Spirit Squad debuted on the Raw brand in January 2006, and quickly won the World Tag Team Championship in April. They held the championship for seven months, before losing it in early November. They were taken off television in late 2006. He returned to OVW in 2007, before being moved to the Florida Championship Wrestling (FCW) territory in September. He competed in FCW until his WWE release in June 2008. He then returned to the independent circuit, and later returned to OVW, where he won both the OVW Television Championship and the OVW Southern Tag Team Championship in 2009. He went on to win the OVW Heavyweight Championship for the first time in mid-2010 and the second time in early 2011.

== Professional wrestling career ==
=== Early career (2002–2005) ===
Brendli began training at the Critical Mass Pro Wrestling wrestling school during his freshman year of college. He debuted in June 2002, and wrestled on the independent circuit, both in New York and in New Jersey. Brendli first became known as "Livewyre", occasionally competing under a mask as "El Livewyre". Most of his early success was in the New York Wrestling Connection promotion, where he had a nine-month undefeated streak. Competing as "Livewire" Mike Mondo he won the NYWC Heavyweight Championship from "Superstar" Dickie Rodz on June 7, 2003, holding it for approximately two months, until he vacated it. On March 26, 2005, he defeated Joey Matthews to win the NYWC Heavyweight Championship for the second time, and later successfully retained the championship against Mikey Whipwreck. Mondo lost the championship to Matt Striker on April 30, after holding it for just over a month.

Brendli was also competing in Ohio Valley Wrestling (OVW) during this time, making his debut in September 2003. He appeared in several dark matches prior to the television tapings against wrestlers including Tank Toland, Joey Matthews, and Carly Colón.

=== World Wrestling Entertainment (2005-2008) ===
==== Ohio Valley Wrestling (2005–2006) ====
Brendli signed a World Wrestling Entertainment (WWE) developmental contract in February 2005, and was assigned to OVW full-time. First he acted as a manager, then became a full-time wrestler and a member of the Bolin Services faction led by Kenny "The King Maker" Bolin. He competed in a tournament for the OVW Television Championship, but lost in the first round to Alexis Laree. Embarrassed by losing to a female wrestler, Mondo issued an open challenge to any woman backstage, and a result, lost to Victoria.

In late summer 2005, Mondo feuded with Brent Albright after attacking Albright during a match with Da Beast and injuring his eye. Albright obtained revenge on Mondo, however, defeating him by submission at the television tapings on September 7. Throughout the end of 2005, Mondo continued to team with various members of Bolin Services, mainly Johnny Jeter and Da Beast. In December 2005, Mondo debuted a character, where he pretended to be a luchadore, and competed under a mask as "El Mondo". He won several dark matches using the El Mondo gimmick, before losing to CM Punk in a televised match.

==== The Spirit Squad (2005–2006) ====
In late 2005, Mondo joined the Spirit Squad, a faction of five wrestlers using the in-ring personas of male cheerleaders, as Mikey. Brendli has described being in the Spirit Squad as "the most fun" he's had in his career. Mikey and Kenny began appearing in dark matches and at live events using the Spirit Squad gimmick, and on January 2, 2006, Mikey lost to Chavo Guerrero. On January 23, 2006, they had their WWE television debut as a group, appearing on Raw and helping Jonathan Coachman win a Royal Rumble qualifying match against Jerry "The King" Lawler by distracting Lawler and performing cheers for Coachman. They later became a part of the ongoing scripted feud between WWE chairman Mr. McMahon and Shawn Michaels. The heel (villainous) McMahon brought in the Spirit Squad to attack Michaels on numerous occasions, including placing them in multiple handicap matches.

They also wrestled in the tag team division, and on April 3, on Raw, Mikey and Kenny defeated Big Show and Kane to win the World Tag Team Championship, with help from the other Spirit Squad members. After winning the championship, all five members of the Spirit Squad were recognized as the champions under the freebird rule, allowing any combination of them to defend the championship.

In May, McMahon signed another handicap match, with the Spirit Squad facing Michaels. The Spirit Squad instead attacked Michaels before the match had started, and Triple H came out to help them. As a result of feeling disrespected by the Spirit Squad, however, Triple H helped Michaels instead. This led to Triple H and Michaels reforming D-Generation X (DX) and they began a feud with the Spirit Squad. DX played various sophomoric jokes on the Spirit Squad and the McMahons, as well as defeating the Spirit Squad in handicap tag team matches at Vengeance and a clean sweep in an elimination handicap match at Saturday Night's Main Event XXXIII.

At the same time as their feud with DX and their alignment with McMahon, the Spirit Squad also wrestled other teams in Raw's tag division over their World Tag Team Championship, successfully defending the championship against the teams of Jim Duggan and Eugene, Charlie Haas and Viscera, and Snitsky and Val Venis. They then entered a lengthy feud with The Highlanders, whom they eventually defeated to retain the championship at the Unforgiven pay-per-view in September. The Spirit Squad as a whole later began a losing streak with Johnny, Mikey, and Mitch losing singles matches to Ric Flair on consecutive episodes of Raw. After two consecutive losses to the debuting Cryme Tyme tag team, Kenny attacked Mikey on the October 23 episode of Raw and announced that he was going to defeat Flair. With the help of the other Spirit Squad members, Kenny was successful, despite Flair being accompanied to the ring by his own reinforcements (Dusty Rhodes, Sgt. Slaughter, and Roddy Piper). It was then announced that Flair and a legend, selected by interactive voting, would wrestle the team for the World Tag Team Championship at the Cyber Sunday pay-per-view in early November. The fans chose Piper, and he and Flair defeated Kenny and Mikey to win the championship.

The group disbanded on the November 27 episode of Raw, when they were defeated in a five-on-three handicap match by DX and Flair. In a backstage segment later that episode, DX placed all members into a crate stamped "OVW, Louisville, Kentucky", a reference to the developmental territory from which all the Spirit Squad members had come.

==== Return to developmental territories (2007–2008) ====
Brendli, under the name Mikey Mondo, appeared at the January 17 OVW taping along with Nick Nemeth and teamed with Mike Kruel in a match against Seth Skyfire, Shawn Spears, and Cody Runnels. The pair teamed up for a while as The Frat Boys, and later The Frat Pack, but they had disbanded by late March 2007. Mondo moved into singles competition, and picked up wins over Steve Lewington, Boris Alexiev, and Colt Cabana, among others. In June 2007, he started a feud with Shawn Spears over the OVW Television Championship, but failed to capture it on several occasions. A one-night reunion with Nemeth followed, before he began dubbing himself "The Professional" Mike Mondo and began feuding with Atlas DaBone.

In September 2007, Mondo was moved to the Florida Championship Wrestling (FCW) developmental territory and defeated Chris Gray in his debut there. He once again reformed his tag team with Nemeth, and they wrestled against teams including Hade Vansen and Chris Gray, and the New Generation Hart Foundation (Teddy Hart and TJ Wilson). At the start of 2008, however, they split and began feuding, competing against each other both in singles and tag team matches. Having dubbed himself "Mighty Mikey", he went to wrestle Ted DiBiase Jr., Sinn Bowdee, Heath Miller, and Jack Gabriel throughout the early part of 2008. On June 13, 2008, WWE announced that Brendli had been released from his contract.

=== Independent circuit (2008–present) ===
After his WWE release, Brendli returned to competing on the independent circuit, and, in an interview in December 2008, said he plans to wrestle in Mexico and Japan. He competed for several independent promotions, including Division I Pro Wrestling and Ward Family Entertainments, where he reprised his feud with Rory McAllister of the former WWE tag team, The Highlanders. Brendli made it to the semi-final of the 17th annual ECWA Super 8 Tournament before losing to eventual winner Damian Dragon. Brendli participated in Chikara's 2014 King of Trios tournament under his Spirit Squad character, and teamed with Johnny and Kenny. After a win over Sinn Bodhi and the Odditorium (Qefka the Quiet and Sir Oliver Grimsly) on September 19, the Spirit Squad was eliminated from the tournament in the second round on September 20 by the Golden Trio (Dasher Hatfield, Icarus, and Mark Angelosetti).

He also returned to the New York Wrestling Connection on September 20, 2008, at Draw The Line, where he teamed with Mikey Whipwreck in a losing effort to Rob Eckos and Frederick of Hollywood. On February 28, 2015, Mondo defeated Rex Lawless to win the NYWC Fusion title. He later vacated the championship in April due a schedule conflict, meaning he could not defend the championship. In 2016, he was inducted into the NYWC Hall of Fame. On November 12, 2016, wrestling as The Spirit Squad, Mondo and Doane captured the NYWC Tag Team Championship from Hounds of Hatred (Boo and Bam Sullivan) at Firestorm 3. 15 days later, Spirit Squad lost the titles back to Hounds of Hatred. The pair continued to compete as a tag team in the greater New York region throughout 2017 and 2018, and also traveled abroad to compete for Preston City Wrestling in England and Westside Xtreme Wrestling in Germany.

=== Return to OVW (2009–2012) ===
In early 2009, he returned to Ohio Valley Wrestling (OVW) both to wrestle and to be an assistant trainer. On February 7, 2009, he defeated Idol Stevens and Johnny Punch in a triple threat match to become the new OVW Television Champion. On March 21, Brendli failed a drugs test at an OVW event, and was suspended by the Kentucky Boxing and Wrestling Authority. He lost the OVW Television Championship to Jamin Olivencia on May 9. After postponing two hearings, he was suspended for six months and fined US$100 on June 29. On November 21, 2009, Mondo teamed with Turcan Celik to defeat Moose and Tilo for the OVW Southern Tag Team Championship. They held the championship for a week, before losing it to The Network on November 28. On May 29, 2010, at All or Nothing, Mondo won the OVW Heavyweight Championship by defeating Beef Wellington. He later lost the championship to James Thomas on June 16. On March 5, 2011, Mondo regained the OVW Heavyweight Championship by winning a three-way ladder match, also involving Cliff Compton and "Low Rider" Matt Barela. Mondo was stripped of the championship on May 4, after attacking OVW president Danny Davis. On November 2, at OVW's episode 637, Christian Mascagni prevented Mondo from winning an eight-man melee, costing him a match for the OVW Heavyweight Championship.

=== Ring of Honor (2010–2013) ===
Mondo appeared at Ring of Honor (ROH)'s Bluegrass Brawl event on July 22, where he lost to Delirious. He returned to ROH at the Ring of Honor Wrestling television tapings on December 9 and 10, defeating Grizzly Redwood the first night, before losing to Colt Cabana on December 10.

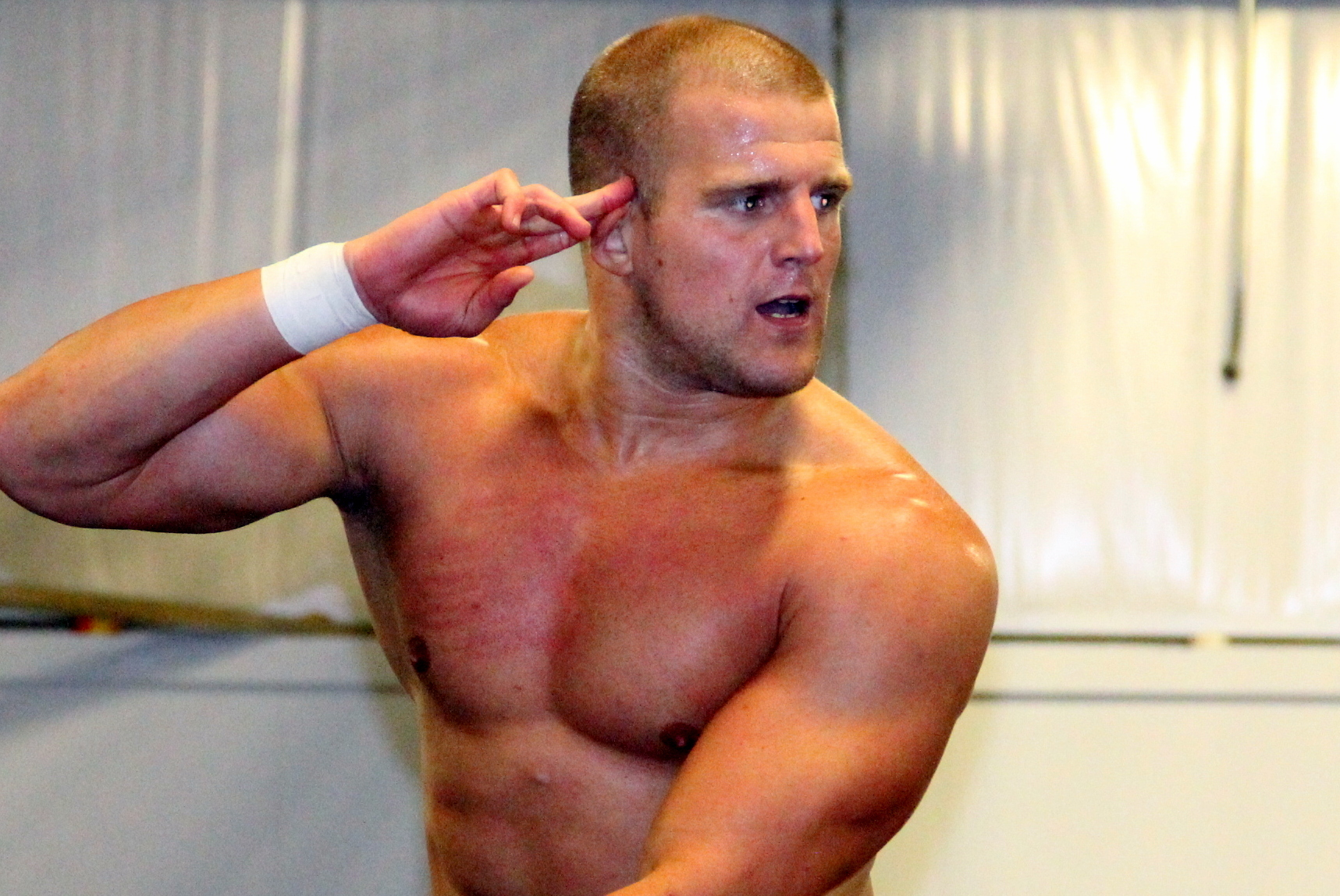
Mondo in August 2013

In late 2011, Brendli returned to Ring of Honor as a full-time member, under his 'Mike Mondo' personality. After a string of losses to begin his full-time ROH career, he eventually defeated Matt Taven. He then feuded with T. J. Perkins, whom he defeated in their first match together, but lost the second. Making his ROH pay-per-view debut at Border Wars, he teamed with the Young Bucks to lose to Perkins and The All Night Express of Kenny King and Rhett Titus. Following a draw with Davey Richards in May and a win over Mike Bennett at Best in the World 2012: Hostage Crisis, he had his first title opportunity when he unsuccessfully challenged Kevin Steen for the ROH World Heavyweight Championship. Mondo won an ROH World Television Championship number one contendership six-man mayhem match, and faced Adam Cole for the championship at Death Before Dishonor X: State of Emergency in a losing effort. Following the loss, Mondo defeated Kyle O'Reilly in a qualifying match for the 2012 Survival of the Fittest tournament, but lost in the final to Jay Lethal. At Glory By Honor XI: The Unbreakable Hope, Mondo lost to Mike Bennett, suffering a leg injury in the process which sidelined him for several months.

Mondo returned in March 2013, forming a tag team partnership with Grizzly Redwood and starting a feud with S.C.U.M. At Supercard of Honor VII, Mondo, B. J. Whitmer, Caprice Coleman, Cedric Alexander, and Mark Briscoe lost to five members of S.C.U.M.

He made a further return at television tapings in April 2017, when he and Kenny unsuccessfully challenged The Young Bucks for the ROH World Tag Team Championship.

=== Return to WWE (2016) ===
In late 2016, Brendli, as Mikey, alongside Kenny, returned to WWE for a short storyline with Dolph Ziggler (formerly Nicky in the Spirit Squad). On October 4, on SmackDown, they utilised their Spirit Squad characters to taunt Ziggler about his time in the Spirit Squad, before attacking him at the behest of the Intercontinental Champion The Miz and Maryse. Five days later, at the No Mercy pay-per-view, he and Kenny attempted to distract Ziggler in his career vs. title match against The Miz, but were unsuccessful. On the October 11 episode of SmackDown, Mikey and Kenny faced Ziggler in a two-on-one handicap match; Ziggler won but was attacked by The Miz before being saved by Rhyno and Heath Slater. This led to a six-man tag team match the following week, which Mikey, Kenny, and The Miz won. Mikey and Kenny unsuccessfully challenged Slater and Rhyno for the WWE SmackDown Tag Team Championship on October 25. They appeared throughout November in tag team matches, before disappearing off television.

=== Major League Wrestling (2019) ===
On July 24, 2019, it was announced that Squad members Mondo and Kenny Dykstra were now signed to Major League Wrestling (MLW). They would go on to debut at that month's Never Say Never show.

=== National Wrestling Alliance (2025–present) ===
On the January 7, 2025, episode of NWA Power, Mondo made his debut, defeating Boz. On the April 8 episode of Powerr, Mondo challenged Mims for the NWA National Championship, but was unsuccessful. He would later go on to defeat Mims for the NWA National Championship at NWA 77th Anniversary Show on August 16, 2025.

== Personal life ==
Brendli played football in middle and high school. Brendli is good friends with his former Spirit Squad teammate Nick Nemeth (better known as Dolph Ziggler), and the two lived together in Florida until 2008. On June 1, 2008, Brendli was arrested for driving under the influence in Florida. He was released the next day after posting $500 bail.

== Championships and accomplishments ==
- Compound Pro Wrestling
  - ComPro Tag Team Championship (1 time) – with Kenny
- NWA FTW: Fight The World
  - NWA Fight The World Heavyweight Championship (1 time, current)
- National Wrestling Alliance
  - NWA National Heavyweight Championship (1 time)
  - NWA Year End Awards
    - Breakthrough Star of the Year (2025)
- New York Wrestling Connection
  - NYWC Fusion Championship (1 time)
  - NYWC Heavyweight Championship (3 times)
  - NYWC Tag Team Championship (1 time) – with Kenny
  - NYWC Trios Championship (1 time) – with Darius The Juggernaut and Sean Wachter
  - NYWC Hall of Fame (Class of 2016)
- Ohio Valley Wrestling
  - OVW Heavyweight Championship (2 times)
  - OVW Southern Tag Team Championship (1 time) – with Turcan Celik
  - OVW Television Championship (1 time)
  - Sixth OVW Triple Crown Champion
- Preston City Wrestling
  - PCW Tag Team Championship (1 time) – with Kenny
- Pro Wrestling Illustrated
  - Ranked 135 of the top 500 wrestlers of the year in the PWI 500 in 2013
- World Wrestling Entertainment
  - World Tag Team Championship (1 time) – with Johnny, Kenny, Mitch, and Nicky^{[a]}

== Notes ==
^{a} Mikey defended the championship with either Kenny, Johnny, Mitch, or Nicky under the Freebird Rule.
