= Fabulous Freebirds =

Professional wrestling tag team

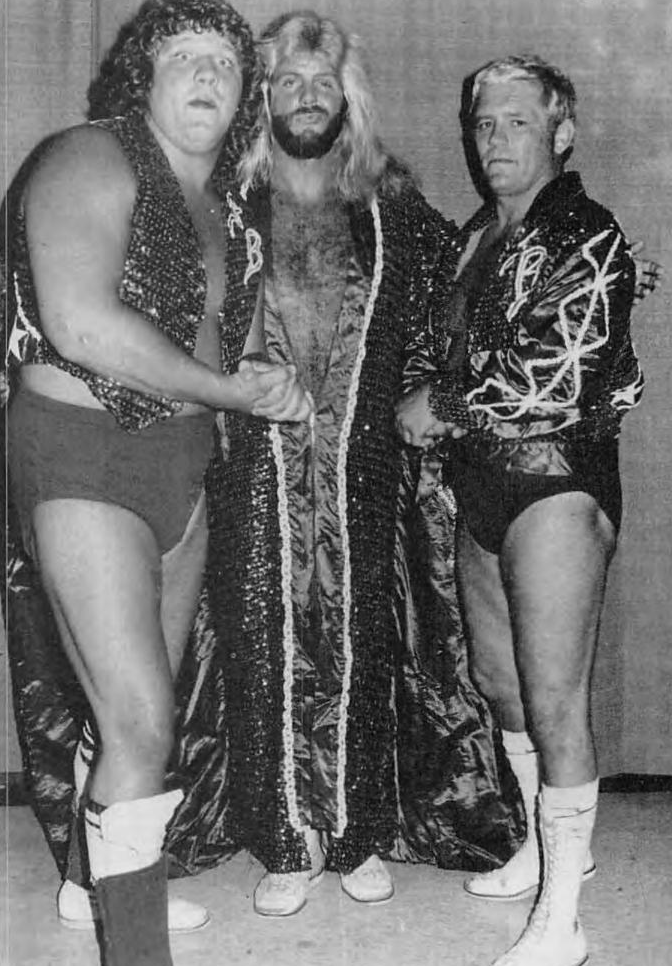
- Left to right: Gordy, Hayes and Roberts, circa 1985

Stable
- Name(s): The Freebirds; The Fabulous Freebirds
- Members: Michael Hayes (leader); Buddy Roberts; Terry Gordy; Jimmy Garvin
- Debut: 1978
- Disbanded: 2000
- Years active: 1978–1994, 1999-2000

The Fabulous Freebirds were a professional wrestling tag team who attained fame in the 1980s, performing into the 1990s. The team usually consisted of three wrestlers, although in different situations and points in its history, just two performed under the Freebirds name. The Freebird lineup of Hayes, Roberts, and Gordy was inducted into the Professional Wrestling Hall of Fame in 2015, and members Hayes, Roberts, Gordy, and Garvin were inducted into the WWE Hall of Fame in 2016. They are widely considered one of the greatest teams in wrestling history.

== History ==
The Fabulous Freebirds started performing together in 1978 in NWA Mid-America when the duo of Michael "P.S." Hayes and Terry "Bam Bam" Gordy began teaming. Though originally meant to be a tag team, they later added former Hollywood Blond Buddy "Jack" Roberts into the mix, and they became a "three man gang" type of tag-team—an unusual concept at the time. They invented a concept that is now called the "Freebird Rule" in their honor, in which any two of three members can defend the team's championships. They usually worked as heels, but also had several face runs as well.

After wrestling for Watts in Mid South, they worked for Memphis based Continental Wrestling Association (CWA) where they feuded with Jerry Lawler and Bill Dundee.

In late-1980, the Freebirds moved to Georgia Championship Wrestling, where they won the National Tag Team titles in the Omni, from Mr Wrestling 1 and 2. Throughout the first half of 1981, the 'Birds had some of the biggest feuds and most legendary matches in the history of GCW. In one famous match shown on WTBS (now known as the piledriver match), Gordy gave Ted DiBiase four consecutive piledrivers, which led to Dibiase being taken away in an ambulance. In mid 1981, Roberts left GCW. Gordy and Hayes then had a falling out, and a subsequent feud against each other, with Hayes as the hero, and Gordy as the villain. Hayes and Gordy eventually patched up their differences, and reformed the Freebirds as a duo. They feuded with Ole Anderson and Stan Hansen over the NWA world tag team titles, throughout the summer of 1982.

The group next wrestled in the Dallas-based World Class Championship Wrestling (WCCW) territory, where they had a legendary feud with the Von Erichs (David, Kevin, Kerry, Chris and Mike). This feud was ignited by an infamous incident in which Gordy slammed Kerry Von Erich's head in a steel cage door, inciting a riot. During this feud, as the Von Erichs would wave the flag of Texas, the Freebirds started using the flag of Georgia, which contained the Confederate battle flag, as a group symbol to counter it.

They also performed in the NWA-affiliated Georgia Championship Wrestling (GCW) and World Championship Wrestling (WCW), the American Wrestling Association (AWA), and the Oklahoma-based Universal Wrestling Federation (UWF). While in the AWA they feuded primarily with The Road Warriors, costing them the World Tag Team Titles in a match against long time Freebird ally Jimmy Garvin and his partner Steve Regal.

They had a very brief run in the World Wrestling Federation (WWF) in 1984, where they were a part of the Rock 'n' Wrestling Connection period. In the WWF, they wrestled under the guidance of Cyndi Lauper's manager David Wolff, but soon left the promotion after an altercation with André the Giant, who was upset when the Freebirds arrived late to a show.

The group then moved on to their AWA run, returned to World Class, and then started a stint in the UWF where Gordy became the promotion's champion, Roberts held its TV title, and Hayes usually acted as their manager or served as a heel commentator on television broadcasts. When Gordy lost the title to One Man Gang, the Freebirds feuded with Gang's stable, General Skandor Akbar's Devastation, Inc. After JCP purchased UWF in 1987, Hayes wrestled for JCP, teaming with Garvin and Sting at Starrcade '87 to wrestle Eddie Gilbert, Rick Steiner and Larry Zbyszko to a draw.

The rest of the Freebirds went to World Class intending to continue their feud with the Von Erichs. When Hayes arrived in the territory in early 1988, he announced his intention to bury the hatchet with the Von Erichs, putting himself at odds with Gordy, Roberts and their new ally, Iceman Parsons. After Gordy interfered to help Parsons defeat Kerry Von Erich for the World Class championship after the Dallas Sportatorium lights mysteriously went out, Hayes wrestled Gordy in a hair vs hair match at the 1988 World Class Parade of Champions. Gordy won, but afterwards refused to cut Hayes hair and instead turned on Roberts and cut his hair. This left Roberts, alongside Parsons, feuding with Hayes, Gordy and the Von Erichs. In retaliation, Roberts brought in the Samoan SWAT Team to eliminate his former fellow Freebirds. Gordy also wrestled on the independent circuit and began spending most of his time in Japan, and Roberts began to wind down his career.

Hayes and Garvin were paired as the Freebirds in WCW in 1989, enjoying several reigns as World and United States tag-team champions, and were joined by Gordy for a while as well. They later employed the services of masked third partner Brad Armstrong (under the name Badstreet) and managers Diamond Dallas Page, Big Daddy Dink, Little Richard Marley and Precious (Garvin's real-life wife and longtime valet). The Freebirds were last together when Hayes, Gordy, and Garvin worked for the Global Wrestling Federation (GWF) in 1994, ending the group after 15 years.

In 1999, Gordy and Hayes reunited as they fought Glen Kulka and JR Smooth to a no contest for Power Pro Wrestling on May 28, 1999. On January 21, 2000, Gordy and Hayes wrestled for Oklahoma Pro Wrestling where they lost the Hardy Boyz.

Gordy died of a heart attack, caused by a blood clot on July 16, 2001, at age 40 while Roberts died on November 29, 2012, at the age of 67, of pneumonia and on November 1, 2012, Armstrong died of a suspected heart attack making Hayes and Garvin the only living members of the Freebirds. Hayes (who retired from in-ring competition shortly after the Freebirds disbanded) is currently the head of the road agents/producers within WWE, while Garvin retired from wrestling shortly after disbanding and has become an Airline Transport Pilot.

On April 2, 2016, The Fabulous Freebirds (Hayes, Gordy, Roberts, and Garvin) were inducted into the WWE Hall of Fame by The New Day.

== Entrance music ==
The Freebirds concept was heavily derived from the Lynyrd Skynyrd song "Free Bird" and the image of "Southern pride" evoked by the band. For most of the team's early existence, the song was used as their entrance music, in both television and live appearances. On occasion, they would also enter the ring to Willie Nelson's rendition of "Georgia on My Mind".

During the mid-1980s, a number of North American wrestling promotions who licensed copyrighted music faced difficulties in continuing those licenses. Other promotions which did not license music were under scrutiny for the practice. Promotions began looking for solutions. The WWF, which hired Jimmy Hart and Jim Johnston in 1985, used their talents to write and produce music under which the copyrights could be controlled by the company. Around this same time, Hayes recorded the song "Badstreet USA" and released a music video, which included the other Freebird members, as well as a cameo by a young Jim Ross. This song would largely be used as the entrance music for the Freebirds from that point forward, though they would use the other songs on occasion.

== Freebird Rule ==
During the Freebirds' career in the NWA, they won several of its regional tag-team championships. While holding the title, promoters added a sub-gimmick to the team – "The Freebird Rule" – which allowed any two of the three members of the team to defend the title on any given night.

This rule has been re-used by a number of other promotions when a three (or more) member team captures a tag team championship. Examples include:

- The Russians: Ivan Koloff, Nikita Koloff, and Krusher Khruschev (JCP, 1985–1986)
- Demolition: Ax, Smash, and Crush (WWF, May–November 1990).
- The Heavenly Bodies: Stan Lane, Tom Prichard, and Bobby Eaton (Smoky Mountain Wrestling, 1993)
- The Spirit Squad: Kenny, Johnny, Mitch, Nicky, and Mikey (WWE, 2006 (Raw))
- The New Day: Big E, Kofi Kingston, and Xavier Woods (WWE, 2015–2016 (Raw); 2017–2020 (SmackDown))

In some cases, the Freebird Rule has been applied to singles titles:

- Chyna and Chris Jericho co-held the WWF Intercontinental Championship in 2000. However, WWE does not recognize this as an official reign.
- 3 Count (Shane Helms, Shannon Moore and Evan Karagias) co-held the WCW Hardcore Championship in 2000.
- Matt Bentley and Frankie Kazarian co-held the TNA X Division Championship in 2004.

A slight variation of the Freebird Rule exists where a team or stable declares themselves as co-champions but the promotion only recognizes the individual(s) who won the title as the official champion:

- In 2017, Bullet Club announced "Bullet Club Rules", which allowed Cody, Kenny Omega and Marty Scurll to defend the ROH World Six-Man Tag Team Championship. However, only Adam Page, Matt Jackson and Nick Jackson were recognized as the official champions by Ring of Honor.
- In February 2024, after Charlie Dempsey won the NXT Heritage Cup, his stable, No Quarter Catch Crew (NQCC; Dempsey, Drew Gulak, Damon Kemp and Myles Borne), announced the "Catch Clause" where the whole stable will defend the Cup. Under the Catch Clause, NQCC as a whole referred to themselves as the NXT Heritage Cup Champions but WWE only recognized Dempsey as the official champion.

== Offshoots ==
=== Blackbirds ===
The Blackbirds were formed in 1988 in World Class Championship Wrestling by Iceman Parsons. He had just teamed with Terry Gordy and Buddy Roberts as the "Blackbird" in their feud with Michael Hayes. He teamed up with Perry "Action" Jackson and Harold T. Harris to form the Blackbirds. They also wrestled as the Blackbirds in the Global Wrestling Federation in 1992.

=== Extreme Freebirds ===
The Extreme Freebirds were formed in NWA Wildside and the NAWA by the son of Terry Gordy, Ray Gordy. He teamed up with Tank and Iceberg in 2004 to form this group.

== Other appearances ==
The original three Freebirds briefly appear in a match against Greg Gagne, The Tonga Kid, and Jim Brunzell during the opening sequence of the 1986 fantasy film Highlander, which occurs at a show in Madison Square Garden (although the scene was actually filmed at the Brendan Byrne Arena across the river).

== Members and incarnations ==
- Main Members
  - Michael Hayes was the leader of the group. Nicknamed "P.S." (Purely Sexy), he was the main talker, and was known to get the crowd going with his antics.
  - Terry Gordy was the powerhouse of the group. Nicknamed "Bam Bam", he loved to fight and beat his opponents down.
  - Buddy Roberts, nicknamed "Jack" for his love of Jack Daniel's whiskey, was the speed of the group, who would often frustrate other wrestlers into chasing him, until Hayes and/or Gordy surprised them with a move. Buddy was also acknowledged as the best ring technician of the group and the guy who would often take the high spot bumps.
  - Jimmy Garvin's association with the Freebirds began in 1983, as he had often teamed with Hayes, Gordy, and Roberts in WCCW and AWA. He teamed with Hayes during a reignited WCW run between June 1989 and July 1992. He was considered the fourth Freebird by Hayes, Gordy and Roberts.
- Managers
  - Big Daddy Dink
  - David Wolff
  - Diamond Dallas Page
  - Precious
  - Sunshine

== Championships and accomplishments ==
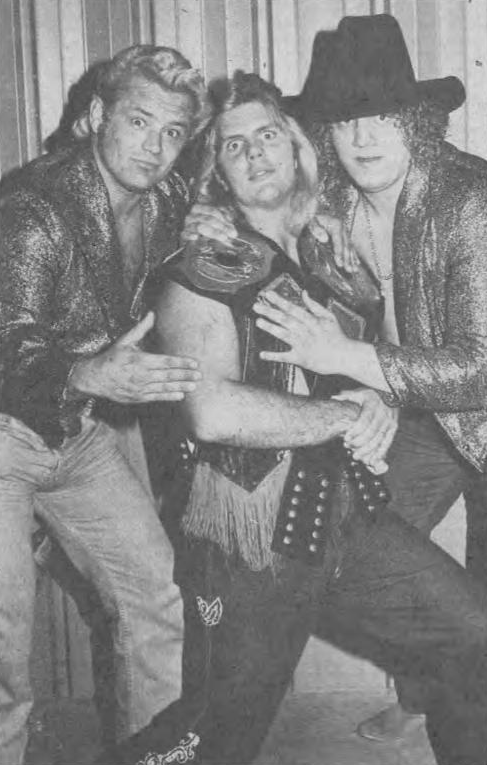
Freebirds as NWA Georgia Tag Team champions, circa 1981

- Georgia Championship Wrestling
  - NWA National Tag Team Championship (3 times) – Hayes and Gordy
  - NWA Georgia Tag Team Championship (1 time) – Hayes and Gordy
- Global Wrestling Federation
  - GWF Tag Team Championship (1 time) – Gordy and Garvin
- Mid-South Wrestling/Universal Wrestling Association
  - Mid-South Tag Team Championship (2 times) – Hayes and Gordy (1), Gordy and Roberts (1)
  - UWF Heavyweight Championship (1 time) – Gordy
  - UWF Television Championship (1 time) – Roberts
- NWA Mid-America
  - NWA Mid-America Tag Team Championship (2 times) – Hayes and Gordy
- Professional Wrestling Hall of Fame
  - Class of 2015 – Roberts, Gordy and Hayes
- Pro Wrestling Illustrated
  - Tag Team of the Year (1981) – Michael Hayes and Terry Gordy
  - Ranked Michael Hayes and Terry Gordy #3 of the 100 best tag teams during the PWI Years in 2003
- World Championship Wrestling
  - NWA United States Heavyweight Championship (1 time) – Hayes
  - WCW United States Tag Team Championship (2 times) – Hayes and Garvin
  - WCW World Six-Man Tag Team Championship (1 time) – Hayes, Garvin and Badstreet
  - NWA/WCW World Tag Team Championship (2 times) – Hayes and Garvin
- World Class Championship Wrestling
  - NWA American Heavyweight Championship (1 time) – Gordy
  - NWA American Tag Team Championship (1 time) – Hayes and Gordy
  - WCCW Six-Man Tag Team Championship (6 times) – Hayes, Gordy and Roberts (5 times) Gordy, Roberts and Parsons (1 time)
  - WCCW Television Championship (1 time) – Roberts
  - NWA Knuckles Championship (Texas version) (1 time) – Gordy
  - WCWA Texas Heavyweight Championship (1 time) – Parsons
- Wrestling Observer Newsletter
  - Tag Team of the Year (1980) – Gordy and Roberts
  - Feud of the Year (1983) – Freebirds vs. the Von Erichs
  - Feud of the Year (1984) – Freebirds vs. the Von Erichs
  - Match of the Year (1984) – Freebirds vs. the Von Erichs (Kerry, Kevin, and Mike), Anything Goes match, July 4, Fort Worth, Texas
  - Wrestling Observer Newsletter Hall of Fame (Class of 2005) – Hayes, Gordy, and Roberts
- WWE
  - WWE Hall of Fame (Class of 2016 – Hayes, Roberts, Gordy, and Garvin)

== See also ==
- The Dangerous Alliance
- The Diamond Exchange
- The Hollywood Blonds
- The Samoan SWAT Team
