= Big Show and Kane =

Professional wrestling tag team

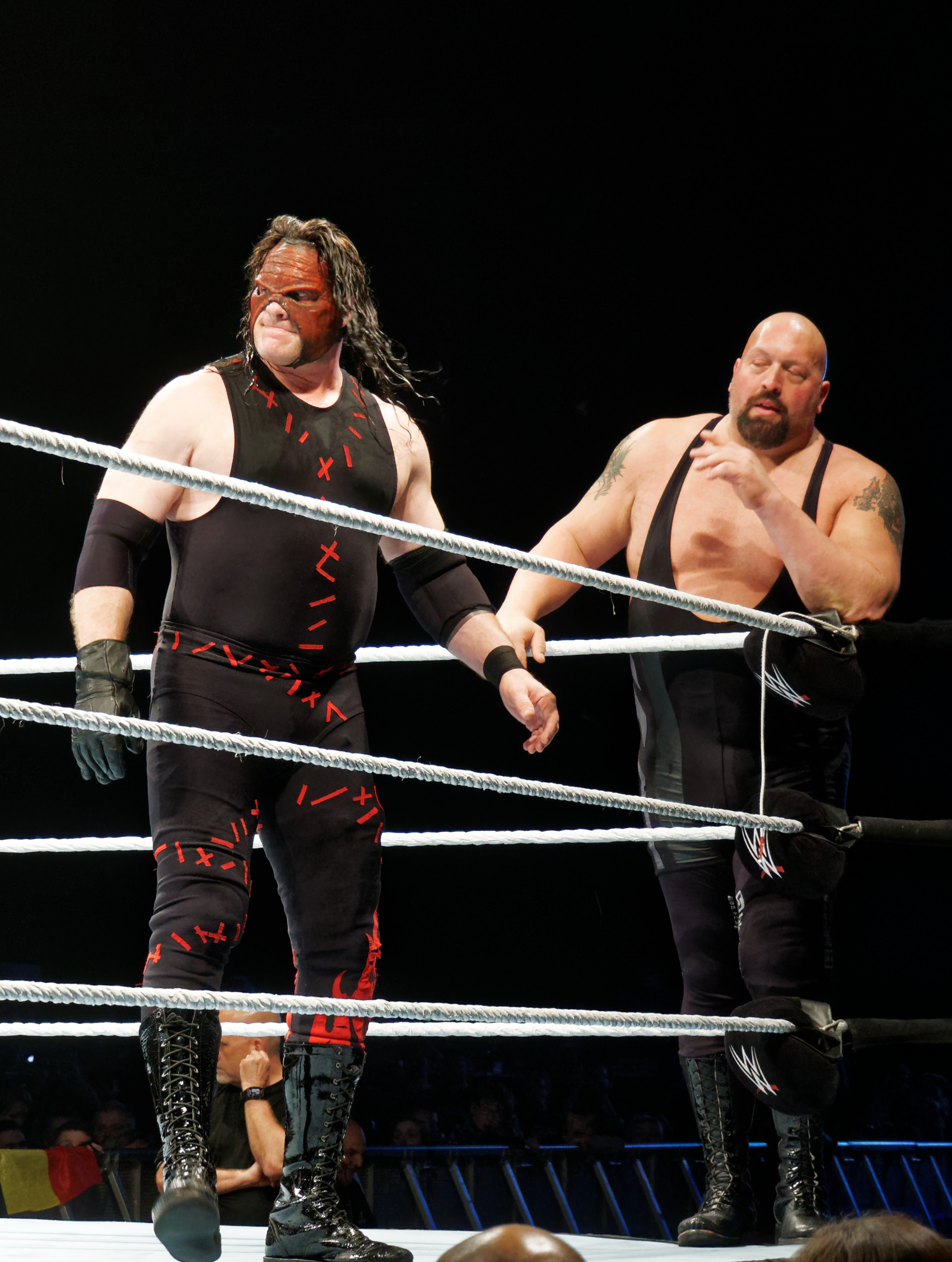
- Kane (left) and Big Show (right), during a WWE Live Event in 2016.

Tag team
- Members: Big Show; Kane
- Name(s): Big Show and Kane; The Authority
- Billed heights: Big Show; 7 ft 2 in (2.18 m); Kane; 7 ft 0 in (2.13 m)
- Combined billed weight: 773 lb (351 kg)
- Debut: November 29, 2001
- Disbanded: July 19, 2016
- Years active: 2001–2002; 2005–2006; 2011; 2014–2016

Big Show and Kane were a tag team who were active in professional wrestling during 2001–2002, 2005–2006, 2011 and 2014–2016 consisted of Paul Wight (Big Show) and Glenn Jacobs (Kane).

== History ==
=== First term (2001–2002) ===
Big Show and Kane would first team together on the November 29, 2001 episode of SmackDown! when they defeated The Hardy Boyz (Matt and Jeff). They would face The Dudley Boyz (Bubba Ray and D-Von Dudley) at Vengeance on December 9 for the WWF Tag Team Championship, but were unsuccessful in their challenge. Their feud with the Dudley Boyz continued with a loss in a Tables match on the January 24, 2002 episode of SmackDown!. Big Show and Kane would then face each other on the January 28 episode of Raw, which Kane won. Big Show and Kane would once again team together to finally beat the Dudley Boyz on the March 24 episode of Heat.

=== Reunion (2005–2006) ===
Big Show and Kane reunited on the October 31, 2005 episode of Raw, when they defeated The Heart Throbs in a Texas Tornado match. At Taboo Tuesday on November 1, Big Show and Kane defeated Lance Cade and Trevor Murdoch to win their first World Tag Team Championship teaming together. Cade and Murdoch then challenged Big Show and Kane to a title rematch with Hardcore rules on the November 7 episode of Raw, which Big Show and Kane won. Leading up to Survivor Series on November 27, the duo would attack various SmackDown! members such as Batista and Bobby Lashley. At Survivor Series, Big Show and Kane represented Team Raw along with Shawn Michaels, Chris Masters, and Carlito, but they were defeated by Team SmackDown! which consisted of Randy Orton, Rey Mysterio, Batista, John "Bradshaw" Layfield (JBL), and Bobby Lashley. Big Show and Kane ended their feud with Batista and Mysterio at Armageddon on December 18 when they defeated them in a non-title champions versus champions match as Batista and Mysterio were the WWE Tag Team Champions at that time.

The duo would hold on to their tag team titles until April 2006, successfully retaining their titles against a variety of opponents such as Snitsky and Tyson Tomko, Val Venis and Viscera, as well as the Heart Throbs. In 2006, the duo would feud with Carlito and Chris Masters, culminating in a successful title defense at WrestleMania 22 on April 2. The next night on Raw, Big Show and Kane lost the World Tag Team Championship to Spirit Squad members Kenny and Mikey after interference from the rest of the Spirit Squad.

One week later, Big Show and Kane faced Spirit Squad members Johnny and Nicky in a title rematch, but were disqualified after Kane snapped and attacked all the Spirit Squad members. Big Show tried to calm Kane down, but Kane attacked him, ending the partnership. Kane losing his mind was part of a storyline to promote Kane's upcoming movie at that time, See No Evil. Big Show and Kane would then feud with each other, but both matches (at Backlash on April 30 and the May 8 episode of Raw) pitting the men against each other ended in a no-contest.

=== Feud with the Corre and New Nexus (2011) ===
On the March 4, 2011 episode of SmackDown, The Corre aided Kane by interfering in Kane's match against Big Show and attacking Big Show. However, a miscommunication between Kane and the Corre led to Kane turning on the Corre instead. Big Show and Kane would then reunite to take on the Corre, challenging them for the WWE Tag Team Championship and saving other wrestlers from the Corre's attacks. At WrestleMania XXVII on April 3, Big Show and Kane would team together with Santino Marella and Kofi Kingston to beat the Corre. The following week, a WrestleMania rematch took place with Big Show and Kane's team victorious over the Corre once again in a two out of three falls match.

On the April 22 episode of SmackDown, the duo defeated Corre members Justin Gabriel and Heath Slater to win the WWE Tag Team Championship, their second championship win as a team. As tag team champions, Big Show and Kane would enjoy successful title defenses with wins over Gabriel and Slater in a rematch, the Corre's Wade Barrett and Ezekiel Jackson in a Lumberjack match at Extreme Rules on May 1, as well as The New Nexus members CM Punk and Mason Ryan at Over the Limit on May 22.

On the May 23 episode of Raw, New Nexus members David Otunga and Michael McGillicutty defeated Big Show and Kane to win the WWE Tag Team Championship following interference from Punk and Ryan. ending their reign at 30 days. After the match, Big Show was run over by Alberto Del Rio's car, causing a storyline injury. When Big Show returned, Kane prevented him from further brutalizing Ricardo Rodriguez.

Kane and Big Show would then go their separate ways. Both of them would feud with Mark Henry, but Henry came out top in both feuds, using a steel chair to crush Big Show's and then Kane's leg on two separate occasions to cause storyline injuries, resulting in their inactivity from WWE programming. Both Big Show and Kane would return separately before the end of 2011, but did not reform their team.

=== Alignment with The Authority (2014–2015) ===
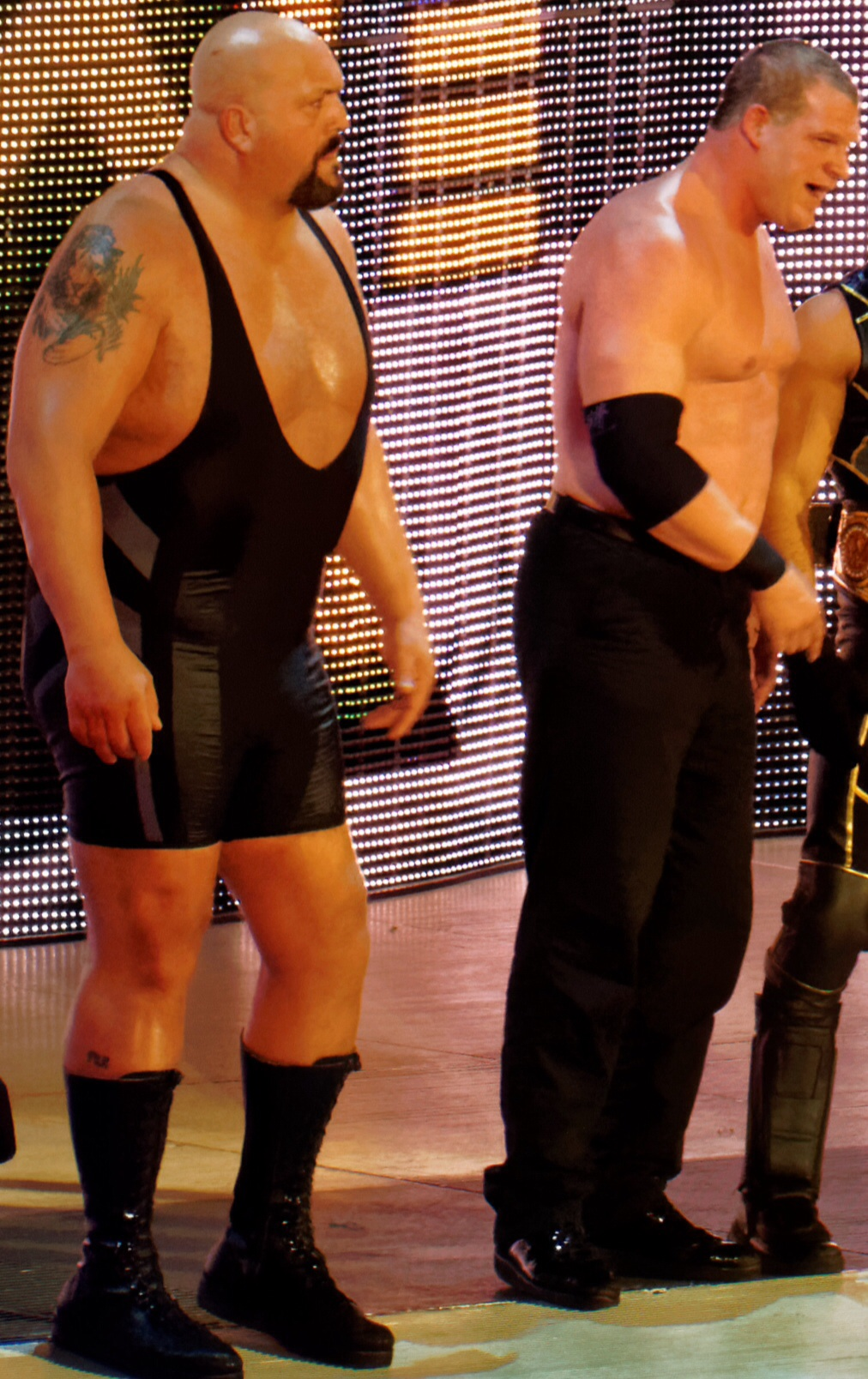
Big Show and Kane as part of The Authority, on Raw in 2015.

After Big Show turned on Team Cena against Team Authority at Survivor Series on November 23, 2014, Big Show joined the stable with Triple H and Stephanie McMahon. At the Royal Rumble on January 25, 2015, Kane and Big Show teamed up to eliminate several superstars. They were ultimately attacked by The Rock, which allowed Rock's cousin Roman Reigns to win the Rumble match by eliminating Rusev. On the February 12 edition of SmackDown, during a Tag Team Turmoil match as heels for the first time against the team of Daniel Bryan and Reigns, Big Show knocked out Kane with a KO Punch after bickering throughout most of the match. At Fastlane on February 22, The Authority (Big Show, Seth Rollins and Kane) defeated Dolph Ziggler, Erick Rowan and Ryback when Kane pinned Ziggler. Big Show and Kane entered the second annual André the Giant Memorial Battle Royal at WrestleMania 31 on March 29. Kane was eliminated while Big Show won the trophy.

=== Sporadic teaming (2016) ===
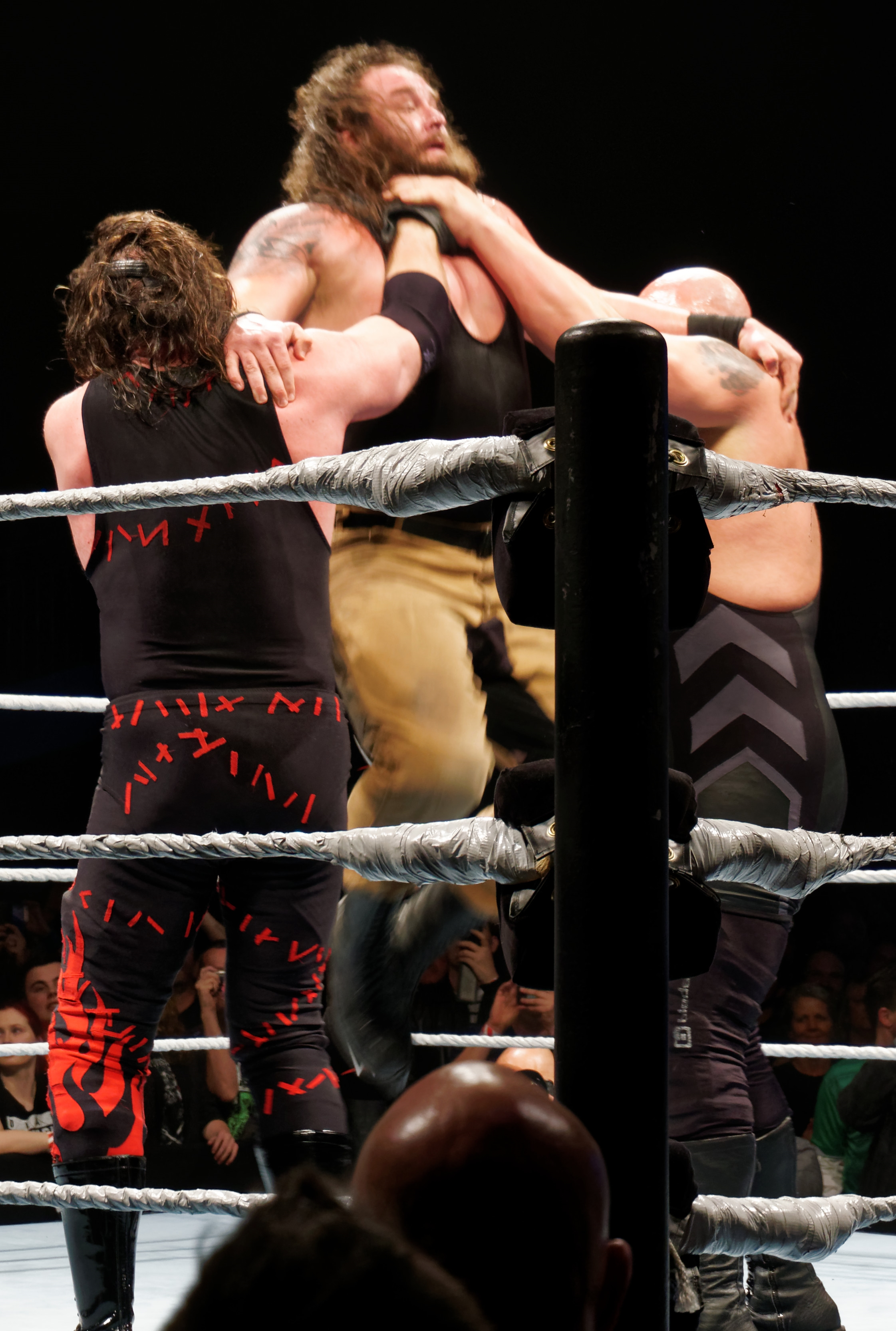
Big Show and Kane performing a double chokeslam on Braun Strowman

After leaving The Authority, Big Show and Kane were once again reunited in February 2016 as faces, when they, along with Ryback, began a rivalry with The Wyatt Family. A confrontation on Raw led to a six-man tag match at Fastlane on February 21, which they would win. The following night on Raw, The trio lost to The Wyatt Family in a rematch, after Ryback walked out on Big Show and Kane.

On the March 21 episode of Raw, Kane would save Big Show from The Social Outcasts, but would chokeslam Big Show from the top rope afterwards. On the March 28 episode of Raw, Big Show and Kane aided each other in taking out the entire WWE locker room to promote the third annual Andre The Giant Memorial Battle Royal at WrestleMania 32 on April 3. During the battle royal, Both Big Show and Shaquille O'Neal double chokeslammed Kane. On the April 19 episode of Main Event, Big Show and Kane successfully defeated the team of Braun Strowman and Erick Rowan. On the July 4 edition of Raw, Big Show and Kane teamed up alongside Jack Swagger, Mark Henry, Zack Ryder, Apollo Crews and The Dudley Boyz to form Team U.S.A. and compete against The Multinational Alliance (Chris Jericho, Kevin Owens, Cesaro, Sami Zayn, Alberto Del Rio, Sheamus and The Lucha Dragons), in a 16-man elimination tag team match in the main event where they succeeded with Big Show and Ryder as survivors.

During the 2016 WWE draft, Big Show was drafted to the Raw brand while Kane was drafted to the SmackDown brand, thus separating the team. The departure of Big Show from the WWE in January 2021 who subsequently signed with All Elite Wrestling (AEW) under his real name the next month had officially ended the chances of a in-ring reunion, while Kane remains employed with the WWE in a limited capacity.

== Championships and accomplishments ==
- World Wrestling Entertainment / WWE
  - World Tag Team Championship (1 time)
  - WWE Tag Team Championship (1 time)
