= Eugene (wrestler) =

American professional wrestler (born 1975)

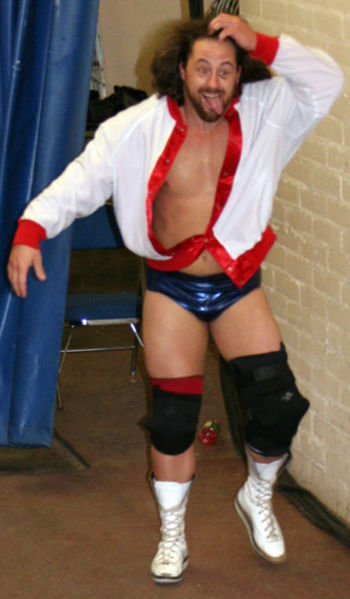
- Dinsmore as Eugene in 2005

Personal information
- Born: Nicholas David Dinsmore; December 17, 1975 (age 50) Jeffersonville, Indiana, U.S.
- Education: Indiana University Southeast
- Spouse: Stephanie Fischer (m. 2015)

Professional wrestling career
- Ring names: Conquistador Dos; Doctor Nicholas Dinsmore; Doink the Clown; Eugene Dinsmore; Mr. Wrestling #2; Nick Dinsmore; Special "E"; Eugene; U-Gene
- Billed height: 6 ft 0 in (1.83 m)
- Billed weight: 235 lb (107 kg)
- Billed from: Louisville, Kentucky
- Trained by: Nightmare Danny Davis
- Debut: 1996

YouTube information
- Channel: Eugene Behind the Scenes
- Years active: 2024–present
- Genre: Professional wrestling
- Subscribers: 22.5 thousand
- Views: 1 million
- Last updated: February 23, 2025

Nicholas David Dinsmore (born December 17, 1975), better known by his ring name Eugene, is an American professional wrestler.

Dinsmore's career began in 1996 in Ohio Valley Wrestling, where he became the OVW Heavyweight Champion a record eight times as well as the OVW Southern Tag Team Champion eleven times.

He is best known for his time in WWE from 2004 to 2007 under the ring name Eugene, where he portrayed an intellectually disabled wrestling savant. During his time in the company, he was involved in various storylines and competed against such wrestlers like Triple H and Kurt Angle. He also won the World Tag Team Championship with William Regal.

Upon Dinsmore's release from his WWE contract in 2007, he returned to OVW, where he won the Heavyweight Championships twice more. He made a brief return to WWE in 2013, but he was released the next year. In 2015, he opened his own promotion, Midwest All Pro Wrestling.

== Professional wrestling career ==
=== Early years (1996–2003) ===
Dinsmore debuted in 1996, and soon began wrestling in the United States Wrestling Association (USWA).

Dinsmore also appeared in World Championship Wrestling (WCW) from August 1998 to January 1999, mainly used as a jobber on Saturday Night he also worked on two episodes of Thunder (losing to Ernest Miller and Kanyon), and on two episodes of Nitro (first teaming with Lenny Lane to lose a handicap match to Scott Steiner, then losing a singles match to Wrath).

In Ohio Valley Wrestling (OVW), he formed a successful tag team with Rob Conway, called The Lords of The Ring. The team had a record ten reigns as Southern Tag Team Champions. Dinsmore also held the OVW Heavyweight Championship a record ten times. While still in OVW, Dinsmore also made some appearances as a jobber in the World Wrestling Federation (WWF), first on an episode of Shotgun Saturday Night in 1999. He wrestled in the WWF as Doink the Clown on two later occasions, and as one half of Los Conquistadores (with Rob Conway).

=== World Wrestling Entertainment (2004–2007) ===
==== Teaming with William Regal (2004–2005) ====
On the April 5, 2004, episode of Raw, Dinsmore made his World Wrestling Entertainment (WWE) debut as Eugene. WWE wrote Eugene as the "special" and overly excited nephew of Raw General Manager Eric Bischoff, who had savant-like wrestling ability from watching his favorites on television, Dinsmore has described his portrayal of Eugene as being inspired by Rip Rogers' autistic child and Dustin Hoffman's performance in the film Rain Man. Bischoff soon placed him under the care of the newly returned William Regal. Although Regal was originally dispirited at having to manage Eugene, he would grow fond of him and the two would quickly become firm friends. In May, Eugene began a feud with Jonathan Coachman, who attempted to banish him from WWE (only to be stopped by The Rock). The feud culminated in Eugene's pay-per-view debut, when he defeated Coachman at Bad Blood on June 13. Eugene then feuded with Triple H, which led to a match between the two at SummerSlam on August 15, which Eugene lost. Two weeks later on the August 30 episode of Raw, they fought a no disqualification match, which Eugene won after interference from Randy Orton. The next week, they had a steel cage match, which Eugene lost and suffered a kayfabe dislocated shoulder, ending the feud.

After taking a few weeks off to sell his injuries, he feuded with his uncle, Eric Bischoff. This led to a match at the first-ever Taboo Tuesday pay-per-view on October 19. The fan-chosen (via voting at WWE's website) stipulation for the match was that the loser would have his head shaved. Eugene won this match (and with help from Mr. McMahon) subsequently shaved Bischoff's head.

With Regal, Eugene won his first and only championship in WWE, taking the World Tag Team Championship from La Résistance on the November 15 episode of Raw. Eugene suffered an injury at New Year's Revolution on January 9, 2005, in a match with Christian and Tyson Tomko, after botching a dropkick. Although they won the match, he suffered a ruptured left patellar ligament, which required surgery and sidelined him for six months. This also cost him the World Tag Team Championship, which Regal lost to La Résistance when forced to defend at a house show on January 16, teamed with Jonathan Coachman as a substitute. During recovery, Eugene made a surprise appearance at WrestleMania 21 on April 3, delivering a promo until being interrupted and attacked by Muhammad Hassan and Daivari. He would be saved by returning Hulk Hogan, after he attacked the villainous duo.

==== Singles competition (2005–2006) ====
Eugene returned to wrestling on the July 25 episode of Raw, taking part in Kurt Angle's regular "Kurt Angle Invitational" challenge. Eugene defeated Angle, winning his cherished Olympic gold medal (per match stipulation), and starting a feud between the two. The feud culminated at SummerSlam on August 21, where Angle defeated Eugene to regain his medal. Eugene then briefly teamed with Tajiri (who, incidentally, had also previously teamed with William Regal). The team lasted until Tajiri's release in December.

Eugene began a feud with Rob Conway on the WWE Homecoming edition of Raw, when Rob Conway interrupted a segment involving several WWE legends who Eugene admired and then proceeded to defeat several of them in matches, such as Doink the Clown, Koko B. Ware, and Greg Valentine (via disqualification due to Eugene's interference). This led to a match at Taboo Tuesday on November 1, where Rob Conway teamed with Tyson Tomko to face Eugene and a "WWE Legend", to be chosen by the fans. "Superfly" Jimmy Snuka was chosen over Kamala and "Hacksaw" Jim Duggan, and pinned Conway with his Superfly Splash to win the match.

On November 18, WWE.com reported Dinsmore was rushed to the hospital the previous night, after passing out in a hotel lobby in Manchester, and was suspended indefinitely. Days later, WWE.com stated Dinsmore admitted to taking prescription drugs, including somas. This coincided with the announcement of WWE's new drug policy (established as a result of Eddie Guerrero's death from heart failure, aggravated by his history of drug abuse).

Eugene made his return to WWE in the Royal Rumble match at the Royal Rumble on January 29, 2006, as the eighteenth entrant. He was eliminated by Chris Benoit. Eugene briefly feuded with Matt Striker, after appearing in the "Matt Striker's Classroom" segment of Backlash on April 30. Striker ultimately defeated Eugene to end the feud. After appearing at ECW One Night Stand on June 11, Eugene formed a tag team with "Hacksaw" Jim Duggan. He challenged Umaga to a match at Vengeance on June 25 and lost, despite having Duggan, Doink the Clown, and Kamala in his corner. He defeated Vince McMahon and Shane McMahon in a handicap match on the July 10 Raw, after interference from D-Generation X (DX). On the September 4 Raw, Eugene and Duggan challenged World Tag Team Champions the Spirit Squad for the title, but were unsuccessful. The team split up on the November 6 Raw. After losing a rematch to The Spirit Squad, Eugene attacked Duggan, turning heel. However, the angle was soon dropped and, before the end of the year, Eugene became a face again. After this, he wrestled mainly on the Raw B-show, Heat.

==== Brand switches and departure (2007) ====
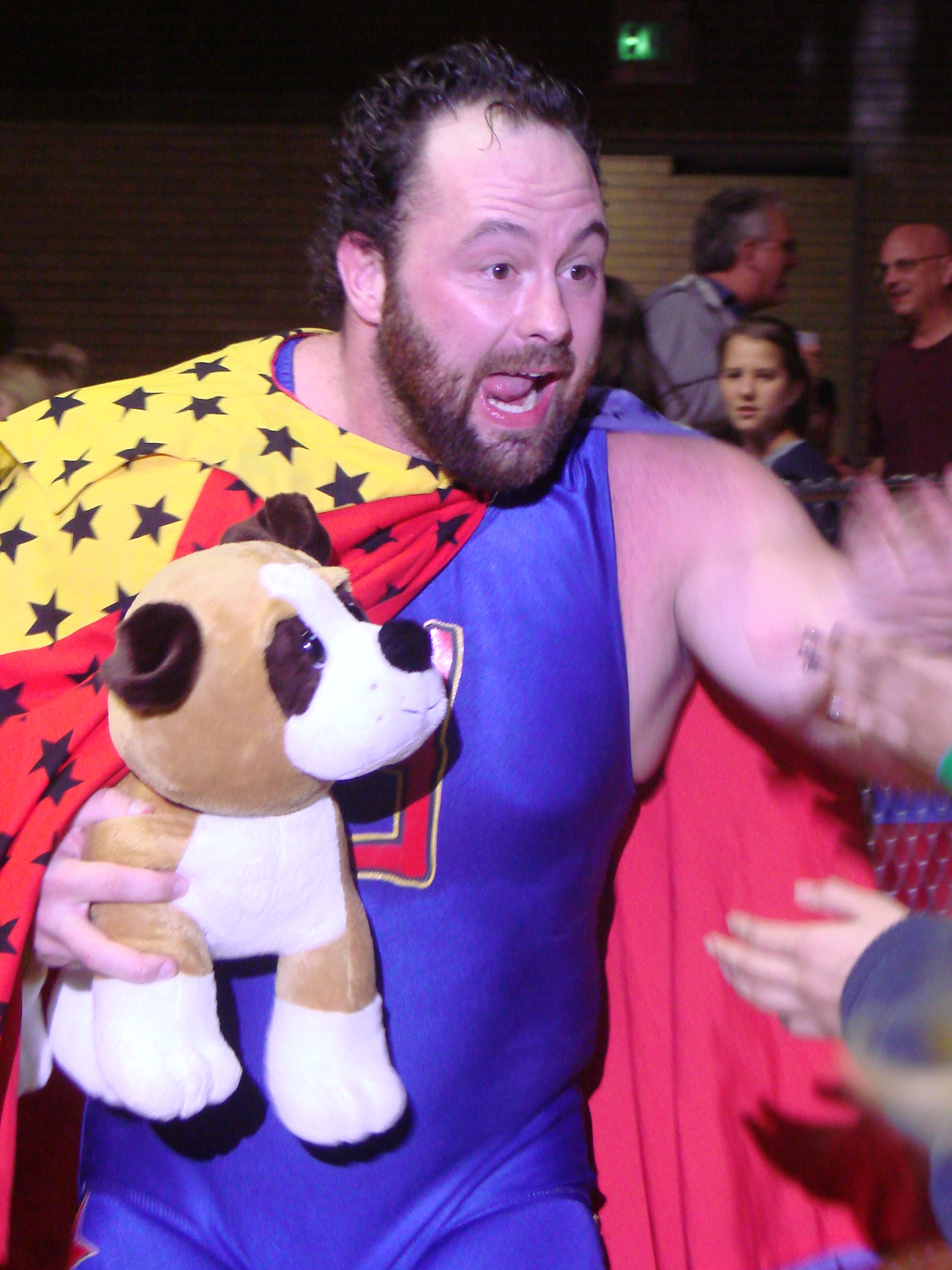
Dinsmore in 2007

On the March 19, 2007, episode of Raw, Eugene was forced into a match with Umaga, as a punishment for accidentally spilling a drink on Vince McMahon. After losing, McMahon shaved Eugene's head. Eugene wrestled on the June 2, 2007 Saturday Night's Main Event XXXIV, where he debuted a new "Superman-esque" wrestling attire. He teamed with Kane and Doink The Clown to defeat Kevin Thorn, Viscera, and Umaga.

On June 17, Eugene was drafted to the SmackDown! brand as their final pick of the 2007 Supplemental Draft. On the June 29 episode of SmackDown!, Eugene debuted for the brand, losing to The Great Khali. The following week, he was tricked into thinking Deuce 'n Domino were helping him win his match against Mark Henry, which led to a quick defeat.

On the July 20 episode of SmackDown!, Eugene participated in a battle royal for the vacant World Heavyweight Championship, and was eliminated by Batista and Kane. Eugene made his final WWE appearance on the August 31 edition of SmackDown!. While shooting T-shirts into the crowd via T-shirt gun, he accidentally shot Mark Henry. Henry retaliated by squeezing him with a bearhug until he passed out. On September 1, 2007, Nick Dinsmore was released from his WWE contract.

=== Juggalo Championship Wrestling (2007, 2011–2013) ===
Dinsmore debuted in Juggalo Championship Wrestling (JCW) in October 2007, as U-Gene. He returned in 2010, at the "Flashlight Wrestling: Legends & Loonies" event, and lost to Breyer Wellington. He became a full-time member of the roster the following year. He had a brief storyline in which he was infatuated with the wrestler Jailbird Man, inadvertently costing Jailbird his matches. U-Gene participated in JCW's first internet pay-per-view, Hatchet Attacks, where he defeated Raven. He formed a tag team with Zach Gowen at Up in Smoke, believing that he could be Gowen's second leg, but ended up costing his team the match by distracting the referee. On July 28, Gowen and U-Gene defeated the Ring Rydas to win the JCW Tag Team Championship. However, Gowen forfeited the championship after realizing that U-Gene cheated to win, causing U-Gene to attack him and disband the team. U-Gene defeated Gowen at Bloodymania 5, but the referee reversed the decision after realizing U-Gene cheated to win.

=== Independent circuit (2007–2013) ===
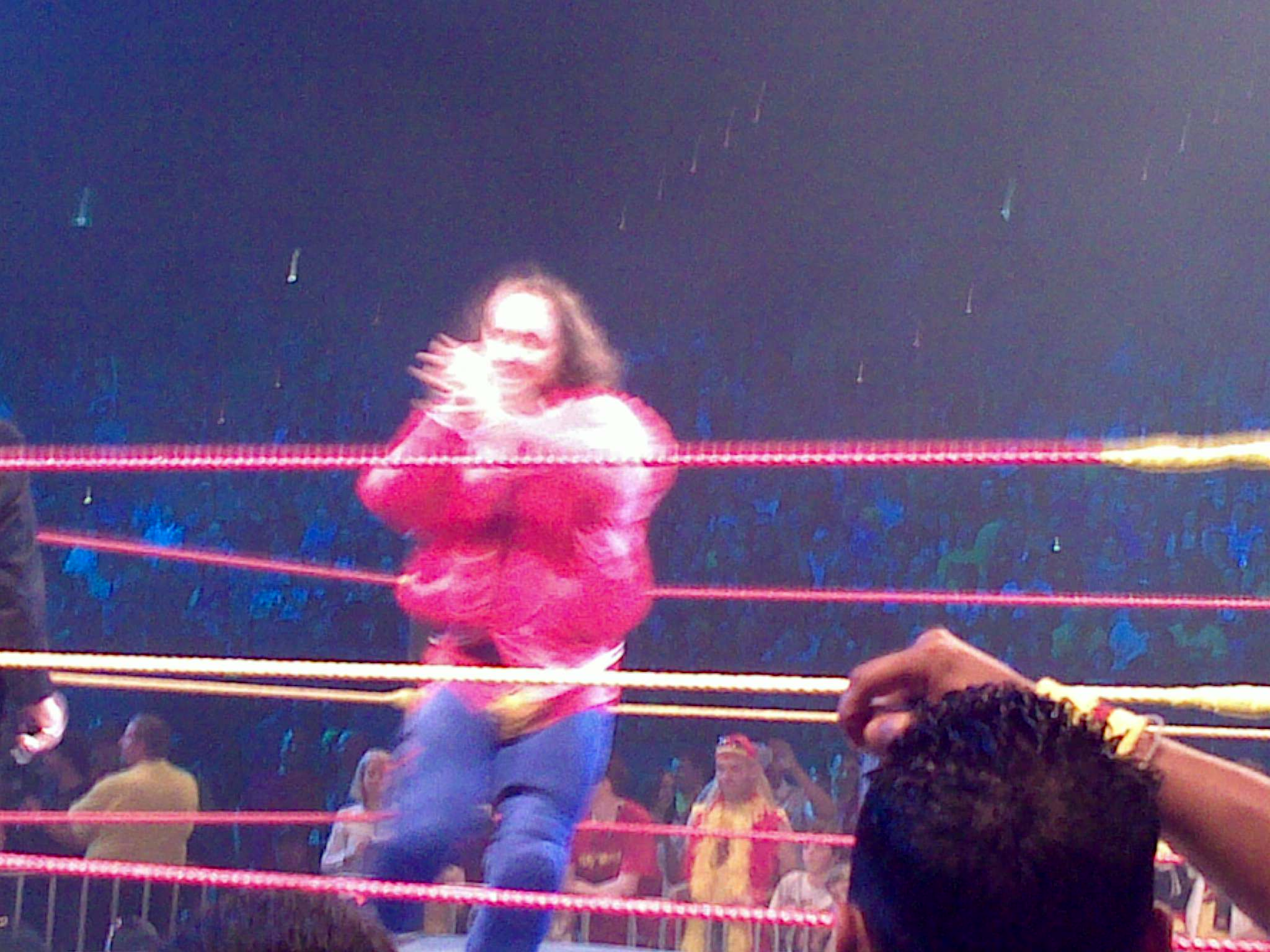
Dinsmore at the Hulkamania: Let The Battle Begin Tour in 2009

In October 2007, Dinsmore became the head official in charge of Derby City Wrestling, the intermediate-level group affiliated with Ohio Valley Wrestling, after Joey Matthews left the position. He made some appearances in Puerto Rico's World Wrestling Council (WWC), as Eugene. Dinsmore wrestled for WFX Wrestling in Canada, in a role similar to the one he played in WWE, under the names "U-Gene" and "U-gene Dinsmore". He formed a tag team with Luke Williams, better known as one half of The Bushwhackers. He wrestled for Ring of Honor (as Nick Dinsmore) in a Ring of Honor Wrestling taping, against "The Prodigy" Mike Bennett. In 2009, he was part of Hulk Hogan's Australian tour, Hulkamania: Let The Battle Begin, where he wrestled as U-Gene.

Dinsmore made his Ring of Honor debut on December 9, 2010, at ROH Wrestling tapings, losing to Mike Bennett. In December 2011, Dinsmore took part in Total Nonstop Action Wrestling's (TNA) India project, Ring Ka King as Dr. Nicholas Dinsmore. On July 27, Dinsmore, as "U-Gene", unsuccessfully challenged Freight Train for the 5 Dollar Wrestling championship in the main event of that promotion's internet PPV debut.

=== Return to OVW (2008–2013) ===
On February 20, 2008, Dinsmore returned to Ohio Valley Wrestling (OVW) under his real name and defeated Jay Bradley to win his ninth Heavyweight Championship. He lost the title to Anthony Barvado on July 25, 2008. On October 26, 2011, Dinsmore defeated Jason Wayne to win the OVW Heavyweight Championship for the tenth time, turning heel in the process. Dinsmore lost the title to Rudy Switchblade seven days later in an Eight Man Melee, including Wayne, Adam Revolver, Ted McNaler, James Thomas, Rocco Bellagio and Mike Mondo.

=== Returns to WWE (2009, 2013–2014) ===
In July 2009, Dinsmore signed a contract to return to WWE. On August 1, Dinsmore (as Eugene) defeated Ricky Ortiz at a SmackDown/ECW house show in Manchester, New Hampshire. On the August 10 Raw, Eugene returned to television, losing a Contract on a Pole match to The Calgary Kid, who afterwards removed his mask to reveal himself as The Miz. Four days later, Dinsmore was once again released from WWE, as a wrestler and a trainer.

Dinsmore was re-hired by WWE on September 20, 2013, as trainer on NXT, and he lasted a year before he was released on October 2, 2014.

=== Return to the independent circuit (2015–present) ===
On January 10, 2015, Dinsmore returned to wrestling, this time with the British promotion International Pro Wrestling: United Kingdom. He defeated Grado in his first match for the promotion. Dinsmore began running his own shows in Sioux Falls, South Dakota, under the banner of Midwest All Pro Wrestling. The first live event was held November 7, 2015. He sold Midwest All Pro Wrestling at the end of 2021.

== Professional wrestling style, persona and reception ==
During his run with WWE, Dinsmore's character was "Eugene", an overly-excited and "special" person who could outwrestle anyone in the ring, based upon some people with intellectual disability. The idea of the gimmick came from then OVW trainer Rip Rogers, who was inspired by his autistic son.

== Personal life ==
In 2009, Dinsmore became engaged to Stephanie Fischer, whom he married in November 2015.

== Championships and accomplishments ==
- 1 Euro Wrestling Federation
  - 1€WF Torino 24/7 Championship (1 time)
- Atomic Legacy Wrestling
  - ALW Hardcore Championship (1 time)
- Championship Of Wrestling
  - cOw Tag Team Championship (1 time) - with Matt Mayhem
- Canadian Wrestling's Elite
  - 123Approved.ca Open Rules Championship (1 time)
- Exposure Wrestling Entertainment
  - Exposure Tag Team Championship (1 time) - with Sammy Styles
- Heartland Wrestling Association
  - HWA Heavyweight Championship (1 time)
- Music City Wrestling
  - MCW North American Tag Team Championship (1 time) – with Rob Conway
- Ohio Valley Wrestling
  - OVW Heavyweight Championship (10 times)
  - OVW Southern Tag Team Championship (11 times) – with Rob Conway (10) and Flash Flanagan (1)
- Pro Wrestling Live
  - PWL Great British Championship (1 time, current)
- Pro Wrestling Illustrated
  - PWI ranked him #21 of the top 500 singles wrestlers in the PWI 500 in 2004
- Rebel County Wrestling
  - RCW Trios Championship (1 time, current) - with Big Beamish & Yung Jay
- River City Championship Wrestling
  - RCCW Heavyweight Championship (1 time)
- UPW Pro Wrestling
  - UPW Heavyweight Championship (1 time)
- Wisconsin Pro Wrestling
  - WPW Gather On Broadway Championship (1 time)
- World Wrestling Entertainment
  - World Tag Team Championship (1 time) – with William Regal
- xWe Wrestling
  - xWe United Liberty Championship (1 time)
