= Ruchita Prasad =

Indian actress

- Born: Bangalore, Karnataka, India
- Occupation: Actress
- Years active: 1996-2008

Ruchita Prasad is an Indian actress who has appeared in Kannada, Malayalam, Tamil and Telugu language films in the 1990s and early 2000s.

== Career ==
Ruchita began her career as a model, first competing in the Princess of Indira Nagar Club contest. She began to take modelling seriously and subsequently won the Miss Bangalore beauty pageant in 1995.

Ruchita started her acting career through the unreleased Tamil film Kanden Seethaiyai starring Kamal Haasan and Ramesh Aravind. Ruchita cleared several rounds of auditions and had started shooting for her part, but the film was later dropped after the director and lead actors fell out. She subsequently first appeared in Rangoli in Kannada, before playing a dual role in her first Telugu film, Jabilamma Pelli (1996) opposite Jagapati Babu.

She eventually made her first appearance in a Tamil film through the romantic drama Kannodu Kanbathellam (1999), featuring in an ensemble cast including Arjun, Sonali Bendre and Suchindra Bali. In the late 1990s, Ruchita became one of the first Indian actresses to call out directors regarding casting couch practices.

In 2002, she signed on to appear in a Hindi film directed by M. F. Husain with music by A. R. Rahman, but the project did not develop. By 2004, Ruchita had worked on over 500 commercials and in all four South film industries.

== Filmography ==
Year	Film	Role	Language	Notes
1996	Rangoli		Kannada	
1996	Jabilamma Pelli	Madhura Vani / Lakshmi	Telugu	
1997	Devudu	Madhavi	Telugu	
1997	Encounter		Telugu	
1997	Chelikaadu		Telugu	
1997	Saradala Samsaram		Telugu	
1999	Kannodu Kanbathellam	Akhila	Tamil	
1999	Chennappa Channegowda	Padmavathi	Kannada	
1999	Coolie Raja		Kannada	
2000	Mr Butler	Radhika Menon	Malayalam	
2001	Kurigalu Saar Kurigalu	Vijayalakshmi	Kannada	
2001	Bahala Chennagide		Kannada	
2001	Kalla Police		Kannada	
2001	Hoo Anthiya Uhoo Anthiya		Kannada	Guest appearance
2002	Nettru Varai Nee Yaaro		Tamil	
2002	Simhadriya Simha	Teacher	Kannada	
2002	Ninagoskara	Varsha	Kannada	
2002	Olu Saar Bari Olu		Kannada	
2003	Don		Kannada	Guest appearance
2003	Pakka Chukka	Meena	Kannada	
2003	Onnam Raagam		Malayalam	
2003	Anka		Kannada	
2003	Jogula		Kannada	
2004	Monalisa		Kannada	Guest appearance
2004	Target		Kannada	
2004	Aliya Mane Tholiya		Kannada	
2006	Neenello Naanalle	Maya	Kannada	
2008	Navashakthi Vaibhava	Annamma Devi	Kannada	
