= Nargis Bagheri =

Indian actress (born 1981)

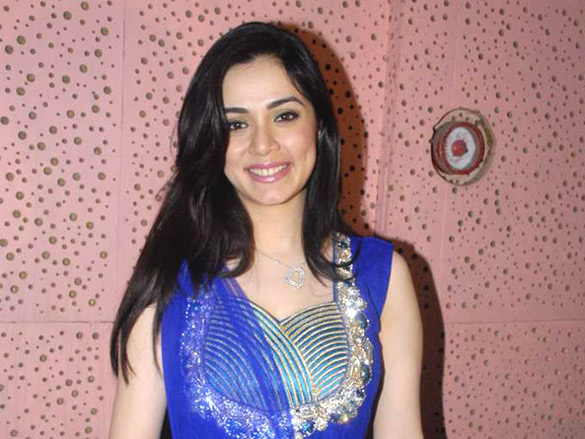
- Born: 10 June 1981 (age 45); Pune, Maharashtra, India
- Education: Mount Carmel Convent High School (Pune)
- Occupation: Actress,
- Years active: 2005–2010

Nargis Bagheri (born 10 June 1981), known mononymously as Nargis, is an Indian former actress who acted in Bollywood and Kollywood films.

== Early life and career ==
Bagheri hails from Pune. Garam Masala was her debut film which was released in 2005. Her Kollywood film Ninaithaley was released in 2007. Her next Bollywood film Pranali: The Tradition was released in 2008. Then, her film Morning Walk was released in 2009. In this film, she also sang a song titled "Nach Le". Her last film was Kushti was released in 2010.

== Filmography ==
Year	Film	Role	Notes
2005	Garam Masala	Puja	Debut film, credited as Nargis
2007	Ninaithaley	Rupa	Tamil film, credited as Nargis
2008	Pranali: The Tradition	Pranali	credited as Nargis
2009	Morning Walk	Anjali	credited as Nargis, also playback singer for song "Nach Le"
2010	Kushti	Laadli	credited as Nargis
