= SummerSlam (2007) =

World Wrestling Entertainment pay-per-view event

- Promotional poster featuring Triple H. Original promotional materials had featured Umaga and the Jackass crew.
- Promotion: World Wrestling Entertainment
- Brand(s): Raw; SmackDown! ECW
- Date: August 26, 2007
- City: East Rutherford, New Jersey
- Venue: Continental Airlines Arena
- Attendance: 17,441
- Buy rate: 537,000
- Tagline: The Party Is Over

Pay-per-view chronology
← Previous; The Great American Bash	Next → Unforgiven

SummerSlam chronology
← Previous; 2006	Next → 2008

The 2007 SummerSlam was a professional wrestling pay-per-view (PPV) event produced by World Wrestling Entertainment (WWE). It was the 20th annual SummerSlam and took place on August 26, 2007, at the Continental Airlines Arena in East Rutherford, New Jersey, held for wrestlers from the promotion's Raw, SmackDown!, and ECW brand divisions. This was the third SummerSlam held at the Continental Airlines Arena, after 1989, when it was known as the Brendan Byrne Arena, and 1997. Tickets for SummerSlam went on sale on December 30, 2006, and sold out in 40 minutes.

The main feud, a staged rivalry between wrestlers, heading into the event from the Raw brand was between John Cena and Randy Orton. On the July 23 episode of Raw, Jonathan Coachman announced Orton as the number one contender to the WWE Championship. Over the proceeding weeks, Orton provoked Cena by interfering and attacking him during his matches. From SmackDown!, the predominant feud was between The Great Khali and Batista. After Khali defeated Batista and Kane in a triple threat match, Theodore Long booked Khali to defend the World Heavyweight Championship against Batista at SummerSlam. The primary feud from ECW was between John Morrison and CM Punk. By defeating Morrison in a 15 Minutes of Fame match, Punk became the number one contender to the ECW Championship at SummerSlam.

Several of the existing feuds carried on after the event. Notably, CM Punk continued to face John Morrison, defeating him for the ECW Championship the following month on ECW on Sci Fi. The day after SummerSlam, Orton, as part of the scripted events, interfered in a match between Cena and King Booker and intensified the feud by attacking Cena's father. Khali and Batista faced each other at Unforgiven, the following pay-per-view, as part of a triple threat match; Batista was victorious in this match and won the World Heavyweight Championship. This event marked the in-ring returns of Rey Mysterio and Triple H, who had been out due to injury since October 2006 and January 2007, respectively.

== Production ==
=== Background ===
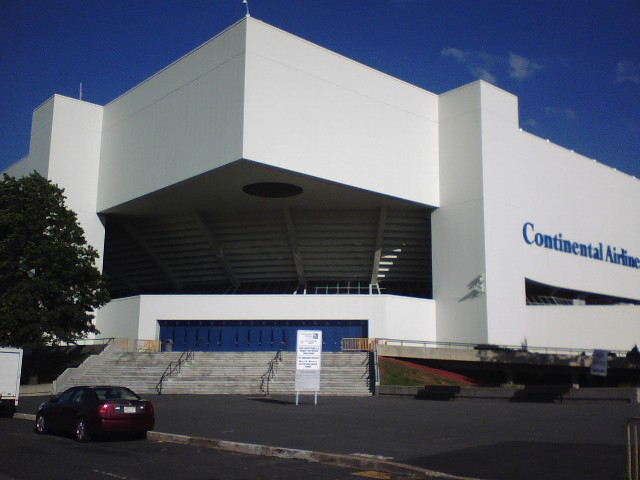
The 20th annual SummerSlam was held at the Continental Airlines Arena in East Rutherford, New Jersey, which was the third SummerSlam at the venue, after 1989, when it was known as the Brendan Byrne Arena, and 1997.

SummerSlam is an annual professional wrestling pay-per-view (PPV) event produced every August by World Wrestling Entertainment (WWE) since 1988. Dubbed "The Biggest Party of the Summer", it is one of the promotion's original four pay-per-views, along with WrestleMania, Royal Rumble, and Survivor Series, referred to as the "Big Four". It has since become considered WWE's second biggest event of the year behind WrestleMania. The 20th SummerSlam was scheduled to be held on August 26, 2007, at the Continental Airlines Arena in East Rutherford, New Jersey, which was the third SummerSlam held at the venue, after 1989, when it was known as the Brendan Byrne Arena, and 1997. It featured wrestlers from the Raw, SmackDown!, and ECW brand divisions.

WWE had originally planned a storyline between the cast of the Jackass television series and Umaga, with the conclusion in a match at SummerSlam. It was scheduled to begin at the previous pay-per-view event, The Great American Bash, but was canceled after the Jackass cast dropped out due to the negative media attention surrounding the Chris Benoit double murder and suicide. However, 14 years later, the Jackass cast and Johnny Knoxville himself would later have a match at WrestleMania 38 in 2022 against Sami Zayn.

=== Storylines ===
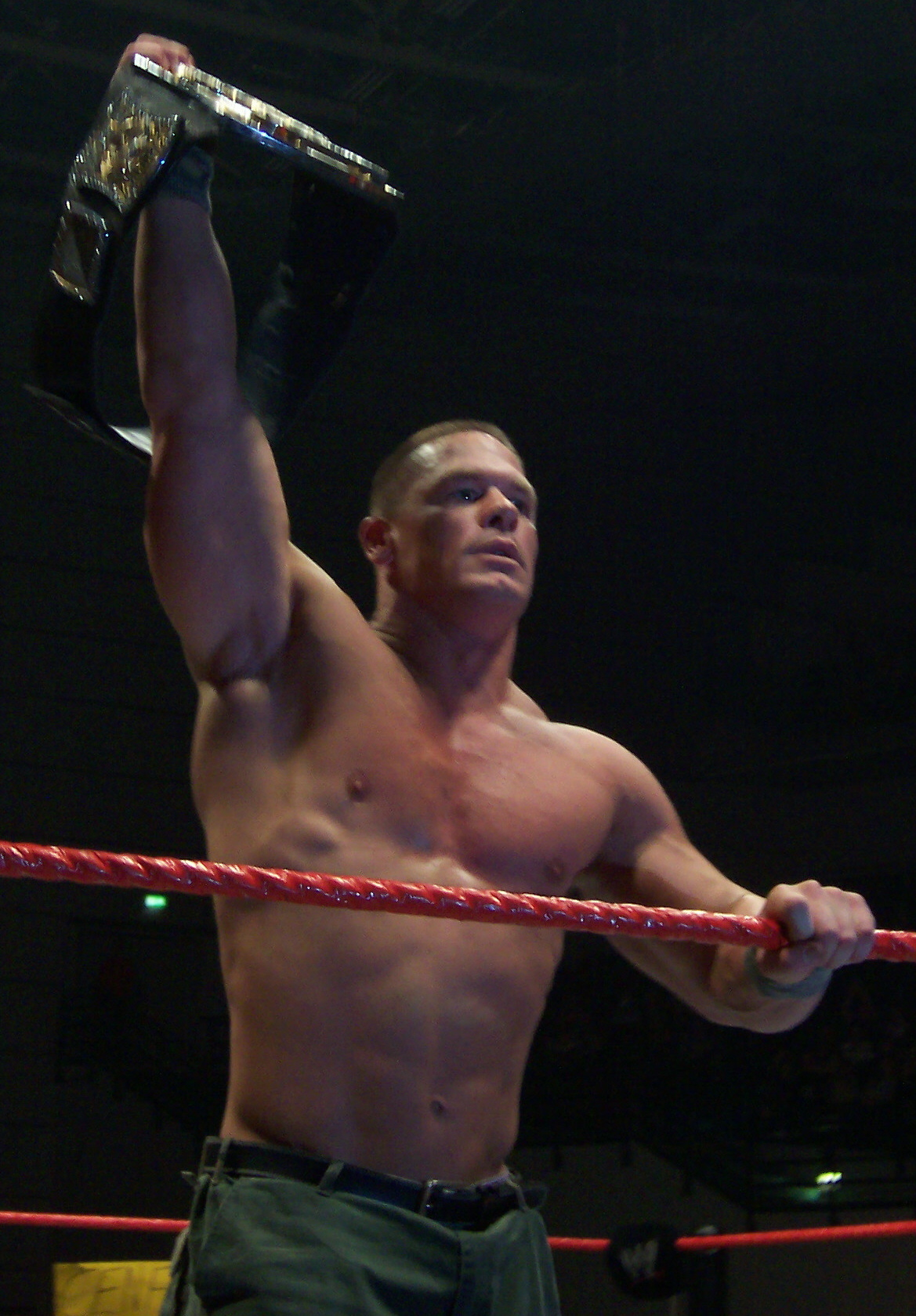
John Cena as Raw's WWE Champion

The main staged rivalry heading into SummerSlam on the Raw brand was between John Cena and Randy Orton over the WWE Championship. At The Great American Bash, Cena defeated Bobby Lashley to retain the WWE Championship. The next night on Raw, after a Handicap match involving Cena, Orton came out and executed an RKO on Cena. Shortly thereafter, Executive Assistant Jonathan Coachman announced Orton as the new number-one contender to the WWE Championship. Before that, Orton claimed that he had never faced Cena in a one-on-one WWE Championship match. On the July 30 episode of Raw, Carlito defeated Cena in a non-title match after Orton interfered and distracted Cena. Three weeks later, on the August 18 episode of Saturday Night's Main Event XXXV, Cena faced off against Carlito in another non-title match, which Cena won. After the match, Orton came out and attacked Cena, which led to a RKO from Orton through a steel chair.

The main storyline on the SmackDown! brand was between The Great Khali and Batista over the World Heavyweight Championship. On the July 6 episode of SmackDown!, Khali issued an open challenge for a match at The Great American Bash, which was accepted by Batista later that night. On SmackDown! the following week, the match between Khali and Batista was made official after a contract signing. That same night, then-World Heavyweight Champion Edge, who was scheduled to face Kane for the title at The Great American Bash, suffered a legitimate injury—a left pectoral muscle tear—after Kane interrupted his Mardi Gras style celebration. On the July 20 episode of SmackDown!, Edge was forced to vacate the World Heavyweight Championship due to the severity of his injury. He later commented-

I'm still the rightful champion. My pectoral muscle is hanging on by a single fiber; literally hanging from the bone. Theodore Long comes out and strips me of what I've worked for my entire career—from childhood until now. My mood is obviously not great right now. I'm disgusted.

I go out there and put my body through hell. I've broken my neck, dislocated my shoulder twice, torn my other pec, my elbows are mush, I have two protruding discs in my lower back. I even got bit by a brown recluse spider that turned into a flesh-eating disease—the list goes on. I still go out there and prove that I am the best.

Why do I still do this? Not for them. I do it for my pride. I don't give a rat's ass what the fans think. I never have. That's not how I operate. I know that fans will be happy with this, and that pisses me off. I've come to the realization that our fans never will appreciate me. But they had to live with me as their champion, and when I return and become a four-time World Champion, they'll have to deal with me again.

— Edge (kayfabe) commenting on his injury.

SmackDown! General Manager Theodore Long then announced that there would be a 20-man Battle Royal later that night to determine a new World Heavyweight Champion. Khali won the Battle Royal and became the new World Heavyweight Champion by last eliminating Kane and Batista. Khali defeated the two and retained the title at The Great American Bash. Five days later on SmackDown!, Batista interrupted Khali's celebration and challenged him to a match at SummerSlam. The next week, on the August 3 episode of SmackDown!, Long announced that Khali would defend his title against Batista at SummerSlam.

Another main rivalry on the Raw brand heading into SummerSlam was between the returning Triple H against King Booker. At New Year's Revolution, during a World Tag Team Championship match between Rated-RKO (Edge and Randy Orton) and D-Generation X (Shawn Michaels and Triple H), Triple H suffered a legitimate torn right quadriceps during the match that left him out of action. On the July 16 episode of Raw, Booker entered using Triple H's entrance music "King of Kings". Booker declared that neither Triple H nor Jerry Lawler could be known as "The King". On the August 6 episode of Raw, Booker defeated Lawler in a match where the loser had to crown the winner the next week. When the time came, Lawler refused, declaring that Triple H was still a king and announcing that Booker would face Triple H at SummerSlam. Booker then attacked Lawler, throwing him into the ring post and hitting him with a television monitor. Then the following week when Lawler was not on RAW due to the injuries suffered, Booker would force Jim Ross (with the help of Queen Charmell) to kiss his feet.

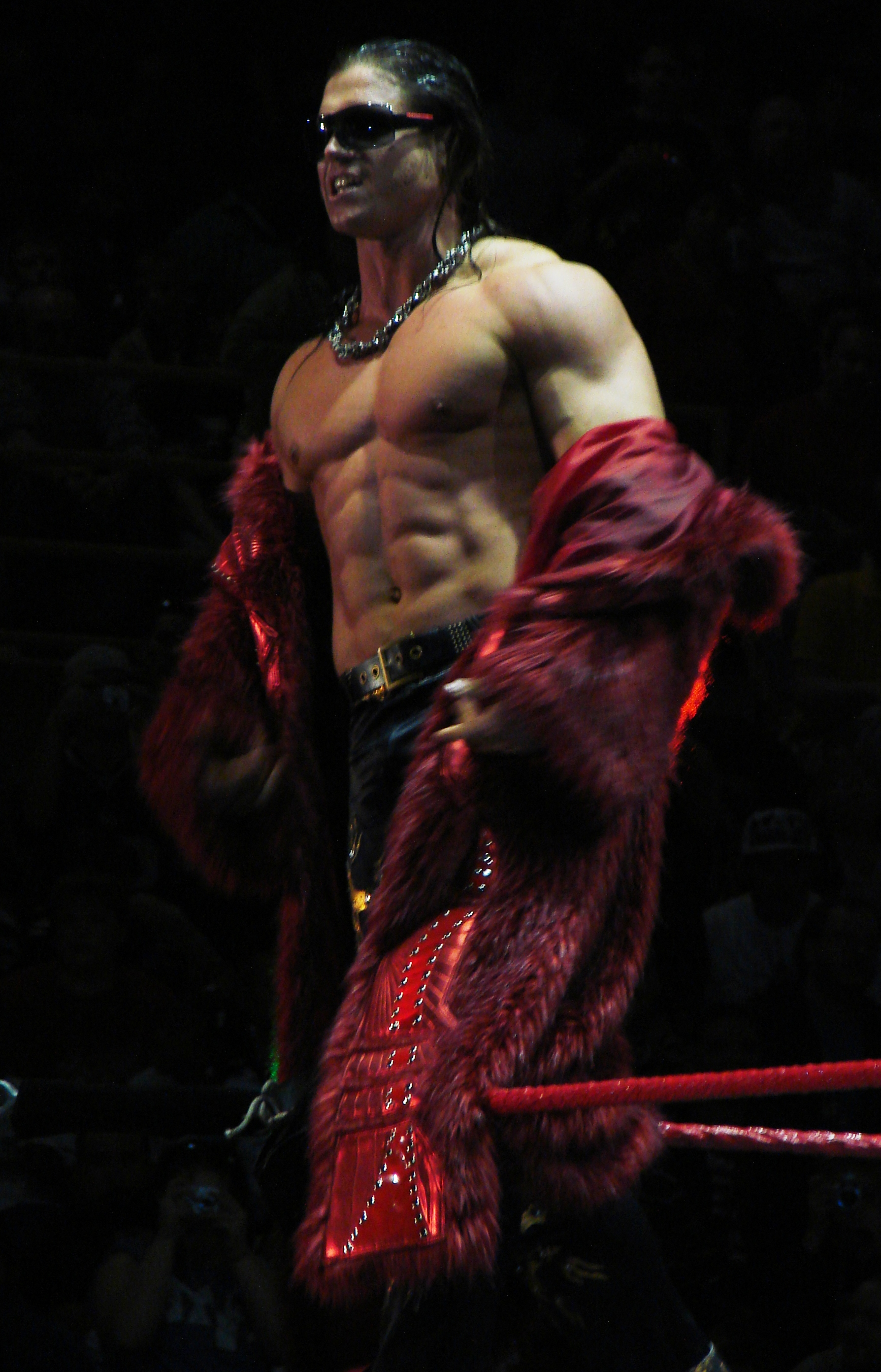
John Morrison, who was the ECW Champion heading into SummerSlam

The predominant staged rivalry from the ECW brand was between John Morrison and CM Punk over the ECW Championship. Morrison (then known as Johnny Nitro) won the vacant title at Vengeance: Night of Champions defeating Punk. At The Great American Bash, Morrison defeated Punk to retain the championship. On the July 31 episode of ECW, Punk defeated Tommy Dreamer and Elijah Burke in a Triple threat match to earn a 15 Minutes of Fame match with Morrison. The following week on ECW, Punk defeated Morrison by pinfall after executing a GTS (Go To Sleep). As a result of this victory, Punk earned himself a championship match against Morrison at SummerSlam.

One of the primary preliminary matches was a standard one-on-one match between Rey Mysterio and Chavo Guerrero. Their storyline first began in July 2006 at The Great American Bash. Guerrero interfered in Mysterio's World Heavyweight Championship match with King Booker by hitting Mysterio with a steel chair, costing him the championship. Guerrero defeated Mysterio the following month at SummerSlam 2006, winning the match after performing a frog splash At No Mercy, Mysterio defeated Guerrero in a Falls Count Anywhere match, pinning him after performing a crossbody off a guard rail. On the October 20 episode of SmackDown!, Guerrero defeated Mysterio in an "I Quit" match by forcing him to quit after hitting his left knee repeatedly with a steel chair. During the match, Mysterio suffered a real injury—an ACL and patella tendon tear in his left knee. Ten months later, on the August 3 episode of SmackDown!, a match between Mysterio and Guerrero was booked for SummerSlam.

== Event ==
Other on-screen personnel
Role:	Name:
English commentators	Jim Ross (Raw)
English commentators	Jerry Lawler (Raw)
English commentators	Michael Cole (SmackDown!)
English commentators	John "Bradshaw" Layfield (SmackDown!)
English commentators	Joey Styles (ECW)
English commentators	Tazz (ECW)
Spanish commentators	Carlos Cabrera
Spanish commentators	Hugo Savinovich
Interviewer	Todd Grisham
Ring announcers	Lilian Garcia (Raw)
Ring announcers	Justin Roberts (ECW)
Ring announcers	Tony Chimel (SmackDown!)
Referees	Mike Chioda (Raw)
Referees	Jack Doan (Raw)
Referees	Marty Elias (Raw)
Referees	Chad Patton (Raw)
Referees	Mickie Henson (SmackDown!)
Referees	Jim Korderas (SmackDown!)
Referees	Charles Robinson (SmackDown!)
Referees	Scott Armstrong (ECW)
Referees	John Cone (ECW)

Before the event went live on pay-per-view, World Tag Team Champions Lance Cade and Trevor Murdoch defeated Paul London and Brian Kendrick in a dark match.

=== Preliminary matches ===
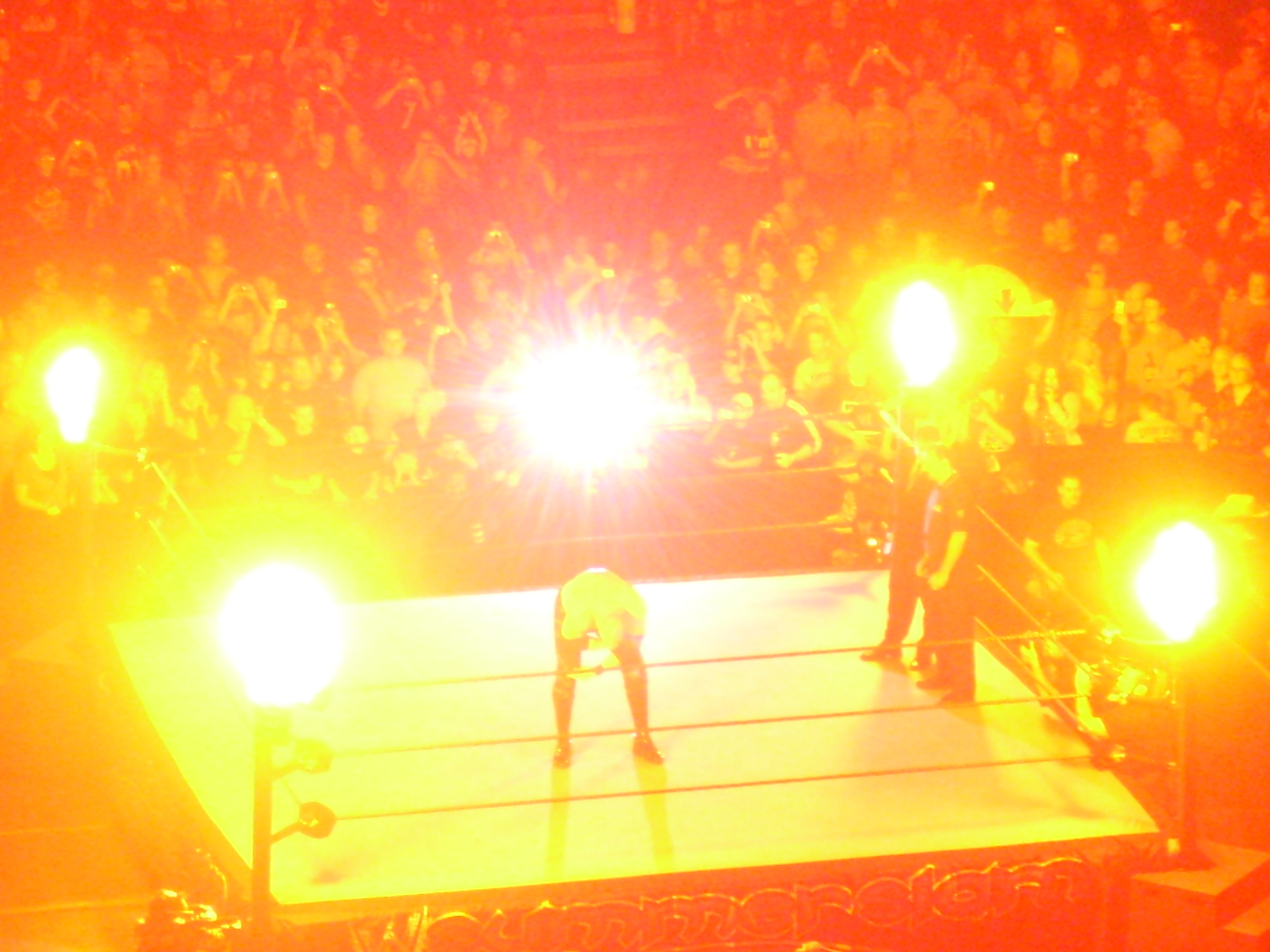
Kane performing his signature entrance routine before his match against Finlay

The first match that aired was between Kane and Finlay. Kane controlled the opening minutes of the match, performing a variety of moves including a scoop slam and a big boot. After some back and forth action, Finlay was able to hit Kane with a shillelagh in the ribs. Kane kicked out of the pin attempt and executed a chokeslam, pinning him afterwards for the win.

Next was a triple threat match for the WWE Intercontinental Championship that involved Umaga, Carlito, and Mr. Kennedy. Kennedy attempted to form an alliance with Carlito in the beginning, but Umaga quickly turned the match in his favor. Kennedy and Carlito soon gained the upper hand after Carlito dropkicked Umaga to the outside. Shortly thereafter, Carlito turned on Kennedy and attempted to pin him with a roll-up. After a back and forth match between the three, Umaga regained control and performed a Samoan Spike on Kennedy, which led to Umaga pinning Kennedy for the win and successfully retaining the WWE Intercontinental Championship.

The third match was Rey Mysterio versus Chavo Guerrero, which was Mysterio's first match since Guerrero injured his knee in October 2006. Mysterio gained the early advantage when he was able to perform an arm drag and a plancha on Guerrero. Mysterio then performed a low dropkick to Guerrero's left knee, followed by a diving hurricanrana. Towards the end of the match, Guerrero was able to perform a Gory Bomb on Mysterio after Mysterio had missed a crossbody. Mysterio kicked out of the pin attempt and performed a 619 followed by a springboard splash for the pinfall victory.

Next was an Interpromotional Divas Battle Royal involving Beth Phoenix, Melina, Mickie James, Jillian Hall, and Maria from Raw, Michelle McCool, Torrie Wilson, Kristal, and Victoria from SmackDown!, and Kelly Kelly, Layla, and Brooke from ECW. Shortly after the match began, Phoenix threw Brooke over the top rope. Soon after, Hall eliminated Maria and Layla was thrown out by Melina. Kristal then eliminated Victoria, but was then thrown over the ropes by James and accidentally knocked off the apron by McCool. Shortly after, Phoenix and Hall eliminated Kelly, and Hall and James began pulling each other over the ropes. Wilson threw Hall out to the floor whilst Melina knocked James off the apron. McCool and Wilson then worked together to eliminate Melina. The two continued their alliance, but Phoenix was able to get the upper hand, first eliminating Wilson, followed by throwing McCool over the ropes to win the match and a future WWE Women's Championship match.

Shortly after the match ended, WWE United States Champion Montel Vontavious Porter (MVP) came to the ring and challenged Matt Hardy to a beer drinking contest. Hardy declined and named a replacement, "Stone Cold" Steve Austin. Austin came out and mocked MVP by doing several warm-up exercises similar to those MVP does before a match. As the contest was set to start, Austin delivered a Stone Cold Stunner to MVP and left the ring.

Next on the card was John Morrison versus CM Punk for the ECW Championship. Punk gained early control when he was able to perform a scoop slam as well as a springboard dropkick; however, Morrison was able to counter a shoulder block attempt into a neckbreaker on the ring apron. After Morrison controlled the match for several minutes, Punk was able to put the match back in his favor after performing a diving crossbody followed by an enzuigiri. Morrison, however, countered a Frankensteiner attempt into a pin-cover while using the ropes for leverage. He got the win, thus retaining the ECW Championship.

=== Main event matches ===
The sixth match of the event was between the returning Triple H and King Booker, who was accompanied by Queen Sharmell. Triple H gained the early advantage as the match began; however, King Booker was able to gain control after performing a low dropkick. Triple H regained control after countering King Booker and performing a variety of moves, which included a corner clothesline and a spinebuster. King Booker put the match back in his favor after reversing a clothesline attempt into a Book End, which was followed by a sidewalk slam. After King Booker missed a diving somersault leg drop, Triple H was able to recover and perform a Pedigree. Triple H pinned King Booker afterwards to gain the victory.

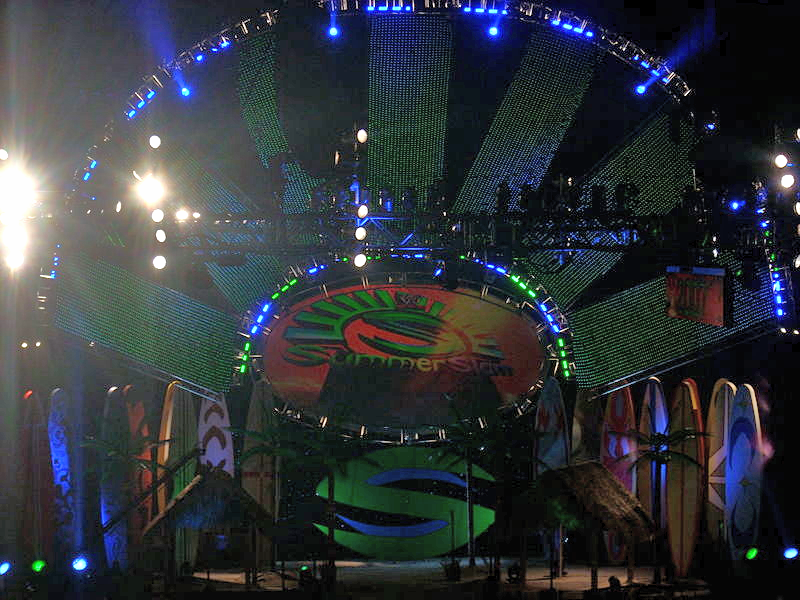
SummerSlam Stage setup

The World Heavyweight Championship match between champion The Great Khali and challenger Batista was next. Khali controlled most of the match and performed a variety of moves, which included a brain chop, a big boot, and multiple clotheslines. Batista won the match after Khali intentionally disqualified himself by hitting him with a steel chair. Since a championship cannot change hands via countout or disqualification, Khali retained the title. Following the match, Khali attempted to hit Batista with another chairshot only for Batista to duck it and spear Khali. Batista would then use the chair to his advantage and hit Khali with it multiple times.

Next was the main event, which saw John Cena defend the WWE Championship against Randy Orton. After back and forth action in the opening minutes, Orton gained the advantage over Cena after Cena missed a flying shoulder block attempt. Orton followed up by applying a reverse chinlock and attacking Cena's leg. After Orton controlled the match for several minutes, Cena gained the advantage and performed various maneuvers, which included a twisting belly to belly side slam and the Five Knuckle Shuffle; Orton, however, was able to counter an FU attempt into an inverted headlock backbreaker. Cena countered a running punt attempt into the STFU submission hold. Orton, however, got to the bottom rope, and performed an RKO. Cena kicked out of the pin attempt and performed an FU for the pinfall victory, thus retaining the WWE Championship.

== Reception ==
Tickets for SummerSlam went on sale on December 30, 2006, and sold out in forty minutes. The event grossed over US$1 million in ticket sales from an attendance of 17,441 out of a 17,040 maximum capacity building. Due to the production of the event, however, the capacity of the arena was set at a lower standard, and as a result the arena reached its maximum capacity. This was confirmed by the ticket sales and by WWE's official website on August 28, 2007. According to a press release by WWE in late 2007, the event received 537,000 buys, which was higher than the previous year's SummerSlam buys of 529,000. The buys from SummerSlam helped the promotion's revenue, which was $18.8 million, a sum lower than the prior year of $19.7 million. Canadian Online Explorer and its professional wrestling section rated the entire event a 6.5 out of 10. The rating was higher than the previous year's SummerSlam rating, a 5.5 out of 10. The main event from the Raw brand was rated a 7.5 out of 10; while the main event from the SmackDown! brand was rated a 1 out of 10.

The event was released on DVD on September 25, 2007. The DVD was distributed by the label, Genius Products. The DVD reached a peak position of first on Billboard's Weekly Video Sales chart for the week of October 27, 2007. The DVD remained on the charts for twelve consecutive weeks; though, after the week of October 27, 2007, the DVD ranked lower. During its final week on the chart, January 18, 2008, it ranked 19th. The DVD also received reviews from customers, as the average customer rating from Amazon.com was a 3.5 out of 5. The average customer rating however, from CD Universe was a 5 out of 5 stars.

== Aftermath ==
During the event, John Cena provoked his feud with Randy Orton. On the August 27 episode of Raw, Cena faced King Booker in a non-title match. When Cena appeared close to winning, Orton interfered and attacked him, causing Cena to win by disqualification. After the match ended, Orton attacked Cena's father, who was sitting at ringside, and kicked him in the head. The two faced each other in a rematch at Unforgiven for the WWE Championship. Cena was disqualified in the match for continuously punching Orton. Orton won the match but not the title. Afterwards, Cena's father kicked Orton in the head, in the same way Orton had kicked him one-month prior.

On the August 31 episode of SmackDown!, Rey Mysterio, Finlay, Kane, and Batista participated in a four-man Championship Competition tournament. Mysterio defeated Batista and Finlay and became the number-one contender for the World Heavyweight Championship at Unforgiven. On the September 7 episode of SmackDown!, Mysterio defeated Chavo Guerrero in an "I Quit" match. After the match, The Great Khali attacked Mysterio until Batista came out and executed a spear on Khali. Batista was then included in the one-on-one title match at Unforgiven, making it a triple threat match. At Unforgiven, Batista won the championship for a third time.

The feud between Matt Hardy and Montel Vontavious Porter (MVP) continued when they were forced to team up against Deuce 'n Domino on the August 31 episode of SmackDown!. They won the match and the WWE Tag Team Championship. The following month at Unforgiven, MVP and Hardy defeated Deuce 'n Domino to retain the WWE Tag Team Championship. In October, at No Mercy, Hardy defeated MVP in a pizza-eating contest. On the November 16 episode of SmackDown!, MVP and Hardy lost the WWE Tag Team Championship to the team of John Morrison and The Miz.

Umaga lost the WWE Intercontinental Championship to Jeff Hardy on the September 3 episode of Raw. Afterwards, Umaga started a feud with Triple H and faced off against him in a Street Fight two months later at Cyber Sunday. At Unforgiven, Candice Michelle defeated Beth Phoenix to retain the WWE Women's Championship. Phoenix, however, later defeated Candice at No Mercy to win the title. On the September 4 episode of ECW on Sci Fi, CM Punk defeated John Morrison to win the ECW Championship. At Cyber Sunday, Punk retained the title by defeating The Miz. The following month, at Survivor Series, Punk defeated Morrison and The Miz in a triple threat match to retain the ECW Championship.

== Results ==
No.	Results	Stipulations	Times
1^{D}	Lance Cade and Trevor Murdoch defeated Brian Kendrick and Paul London by pinfall	Tag team match	7:27
2	Kane defeated Finlay by pinfall	Singles match	8:54
3	Umaga (c) defeated Carlito and Mr. Kennedy by pinfall	Triple threat match for the WWE Intercontinental Championship	7:35
4	Rey Mysterio defeated Chavo Guerrero by pinfall	Singles match	12:06
5	Beth Phoenix won by last eliminating Michelle McCool	Battle Royal to determine the #1 contender to the WWE Women's Championship	7:09
6	John Morrison (c) defeated CM Punk by pinfall	Singles match for the ECW Championship	7:09
7	Triple H defeated King Booker (with Queen Sharmell) by pinfall	Singles match	7:58
8	Batista defeated The Great Khali (c) (with Ranjin Singh) by disqualification	Singles match for the World Heavyweight Championship	6:51
9	John Cena (c) defeated Randy Orton by pinfall	Singles match for the WWE Championship	21:20
(c) / – the champion(s) heading into the match; D / – this was a dark match

=== Battle royal eliminations ===
Elimination	Wrestler	Eliminated by	Time
1	Brooke	Beth Phoenix	01:18
2	Maria	Jillian Hall	01:56
3	Layla	Melina	02:21
4	Victoria	Kristal	03:45
5	Kristal	Michelle McCool	04:06
6	Kelly Kelly	Beth Phoenix and Jillian Hall	04:36
7	Jillian Hall	Torrie Wilson	05:12
8	Mickie James	Melina	05:22
9	Melina	Michelle McCool & Torrie Wilson	06:12
10	Torrie Wilson	Beth Phoenix	06:42
11	Michelle McCool	Beth Phoenix	07:09
Winner:	Beth Phoenix		
