= Jabilamma Pelli =

- Movie Poster
- Directed by: A. Kodandarami Reddy
- Written by: K. L. Prasad (story / dialogues)
- Screenplay by: A. Kodandarami Reddy
- Produced by: Babu S. S. Burugupalli
- Starring: Jagapati Babu; Maheswari; Ruchita Prasad; Vanisri
- Cinematography: P. S. Prakash
- Edited by: K. A. Venkatesh; Marthand K. Venkatesh
- Music by: M. M. Keeravani
- Production company: Lakshmi Srinivasa Art Films
- Release date: 2 October 1996
- Running time: 143 minutes
- Country: India
- Language: Telugu

Jabilamma Pelli is a 1996 Telugu-language drama film, produced by Babu S. S. Burugupalli under the Lakshmi Srinivasa Art Films banner and directed by A. Kodandarami Reddy. It stars Jagapati Babu, Maheswari, Ruchita Prasad, Vanisri and music composed by M. M. Keeravani.

== Cast ==
- Jagapati Babu as Ramudu
- Maheswari as Jyothi
- Ruchita Prasad as Madhura Vani / Lakshmi
- Vanisri as Padmavathi Devi
- K. Ashok Kumar as Podugu Babu
- Tanikella Bharani as Anjineel
- J. V. Somayajulu as Priest
- Manju Bhargavi as Manjari
- Brahmanandam
- M. Balayya
- Giri Babu
- AVS
- Chalapathi Rao
- Gundu Hanumantha Rao
- Rajitha
- Baby Priya

== Soundtrack ==
Jabilamma Pelli

Film score by M. M. Keeravani
- Released: 1996
- Genre: Soundtrack
- Length: 30:37
- Label: T-Series
- Producer: M. M. Keeravani

M. M. Keeravani chronology
Bombay Priyudu (1996)	Jabilamma Pelli (1996)	Pavitra Bandham (1996)

The music for the film was composed by M. M. Keeravani and released by the T-Series Music Company.

No.	Title	Lyrics	Singer(s)	Length
1.	"Oh Chukkaluri Chandamama"	Sirivennela Sitarama Sastry	S. P. Balasubrahmanyam, Chitra	4:35
2.	"Boddupai Vadanam"	Bhuvanachandra	Mano, Chitra	5:05
3.	"Ghallu Ghallu"	Sirivennela Sitarama Sastry	S. P. Balasubrahmanyam, Chitra	5:08
4.	"Paluku Paluku Chilakala"	Sirivennela Sitarama Sastry	S. P. Balasubrahmanyam, Chitra	4:40
5.	"Kokoko Kokoko"	Veturi	S. P. Balasubrahmanyam, Chitra	5:08
6.	"Unnachota Evvarini"	Sirivennela Sitarama Sastry	M. M. Keeravani	6:01
Total length:				30:37
