= Morning Walk =

2009 film by Arup Dutta

- Theatrical poster
- Directed by: Arup Dutta
- Written by: Sujit Sen, Arup Dutta
- Produced by: Tapan Biswas
- Starring: Anupam Kher; Sharmila Tagore; Rajit Kapur; Divya Dutta
- Cinematography: Chandan Goswami
- Music by: Jeet Gannguli; Lyrics by Sanjeev Tiwari
- Production company: Cinemawallah
- Distributed by: Inox Motion Pictures
- Release date: 10 July 2009
- Country: India
- Language: Hindi

Morning Walk is an Indian Hindi-language film directed by Arup Dutta featuring Anupam Kher as protagonist. It was released in India on 10 July 2009.

== Synopsis ==
One morning walk in Joymohan's life changes it all. After suffering a heart-attack one morning, on his birthday, Joymohan (Anupam Kher) realizes that he needs to spend more time with his family - son (Rajit Kapoor), daughter-in-law (Divya Dutta) and granddaughter Avika Gor and mend broken bridges of the past.

It is during his Morning Walk that his life changes forever. He meets his once-upon-a-time-student and friend Neelima (Sharmila Tagore), now a mother of two, who carries with her a strange but surreal truth.

Neelima's bright and beautiful daughter, Anjali (Nargis Bagheri), dreams of pursuing her doctorate from the US, and is encouraged by her doting mother and boyfriend Ajay (Shayan Munshi), an upcoming singer who will go to any lengths to put a smile on her face. A beautiful and heart-tugging tale of two families who are so different from one another, yet connected through a special bond.

== Cast ==
- Anupam Kher as Joymohan: A professor living on his own in Kolkata Emotional yet willing to make amends, he surprises his loving son Indra by moving to Mumbai to stay with him. Indra has now changed as he has additional responsibilities and a family to look after. Life takes a sudden turn one day when he is out for his morning walk.
- Sharmila Tagore as Neelima: Staying in Mumbai with her daughter, she has a come a long way in life. Part of an abusive and cold marriage earlier. Is now a yoga instructor and preparing to send her daughter to the US for further studies.
- Rajit Kapoor as Indra: The most loving and caring son that any father could ask for. Is caught up between the frictional relationship shared by his wife Rita with his father Joymohan.
- Divya Dutta as Rita: Strong, smart yet edgy, Rita personifies today's working woman who has many wants and desires but circumstances have led her to be an altogether different person. Has a tumultuous relationship with her father-in-law and wants him to sell his Kolkata house to fund their new house. Deeper truths unfold and so do existing relationships...Rita is caught between her personal ambitions and her family.
- Shayan Munshi as Ajay: A struggling singer. Completely in love with Anjali and would go to any lengths to see a smile on her face
- Nargis Bagheri as Anjali: The sweet and bubbly daughter of Neelima, Anjali has a penchant for books and wants to pursue her higher studies in the USA She supports Ajay in every possible way. The truth changes her life completely...is it for the better or worse?
- Avika Gor as Gargi: Joymohan's granddaughter who puts an instant smile on his face. A school-going child, she completely adores Joymohan and is immensely overjoyed when her grandfather moves in with the family.

== Critical reception ==
Morning Walk was released on 10 July 2009 and received generally negative reviews by critics in India. It was slammed as "too slow and boring to be watched in theatres" and "a dull and dreary experience."

== Tracks ==
Tracklist
No.	Title	Lyrics	Artist(s)	Length
1.	"Bhor Bhayo"	Sanjeev Tiwari	Shreya Ghoshal, Joi, Rashid Khan	4:57
2.	"Manwa"	Sanjeev Tiwari	Rashid Khan, Dibbendu Mukherjee	4:59
3.	"Meethi Meethi Baatein"	Nida Fazli	Shaan, Shreya Ghoshal	3:31
4.	"Dolna"	Sanjeev Tiwari	Shreya Ghoshal	5:32
5.	"Aasman Chhoona Nahin"	Shaan	Shaan	6:09
6.	"Nachle"	Sanjeev Tiwari	Nargis Bagheri, Shaan, Joi	4:03

== Accolades ==
Award Ceremony	Category	Recipient	Result	Ref.(s)
2nd Mirchi Music Awards	Upcoming Music Composer of The Year	Jeet Ganguly - "Bhor Bhayo"	Won	
