= SummerSlam (2006) =

World Wrestling Entertainment pay-per-view event

- Promotional poster featuring various WWE wrestlers
- Promotion: World Wrestling Entertainment
- Brand(s): Raw; SmackDown! ECW
- Date: August 20, 2006
- City: Boston, Massachusetts
- Venue: TD Banknorth Garden
- Attendance: 16,168
- Buy rate: 529,000
- Tagline: The Biggest Party of the Summer

Pay-per-view chronology
← Previous; The Great American Bash	Next → Unforgiven

SummerSlam chronology
← Previous; 2005	Next → 2007

The 2006 SummerSlam was a professional wrestling pay-per-view (PPV) event produced by World Wrestling Entertainment (WWE). It was the 19th annual SummerSlam and took place on August 20, 2006, at the TD Banknorth Garden in Boston, Massachusetts, held for wrestlers from the promotion's Raw, SmackDown!, and ECW brand divisions. This marked the first inter-brand pay-per-view to include the ECW brand.

The main match on the Raw brand featured Edge against John Cena for the WWE Championship, which Edge won by pinfall after hitting Cena in the back of the head with a pair of brass knuckles. The main match on the SmackDown! brand pitted King Booker against Batista for the World Heavyweight Championship, which Batista won by disqualification following interference from Queen Sharmell. The primary match on the ECW brand pitted Big Show against Sabu in an Extreme Rules match for the ECW World Championship. Big Show won the match and retained the title after pinning Sabu following a chokeslam through a table. The undercard included D-Generation X (Triple H and Shawn Michaels) against Vince McMahon and Shane McMahon as well as Hulk Hogan against Randy Orton, which was Hogan's last match in WWE.

Several of the existing feuds carried on after the event. D-Generation X continued feuding with The McMahons, defeating them and The Big Show in a Hell in a Cell match the following month. The feud between Batista and King Booker also continued, with the two facing off as part of a fatal four-way match at No Mercy, which Booker won. The following month, at Unforgiven, John Cena defeated Edge in a Tables, Ladders, and Chairs match to win the WWE Championship and conclude their storyline.

== Production ==
=== Background ===
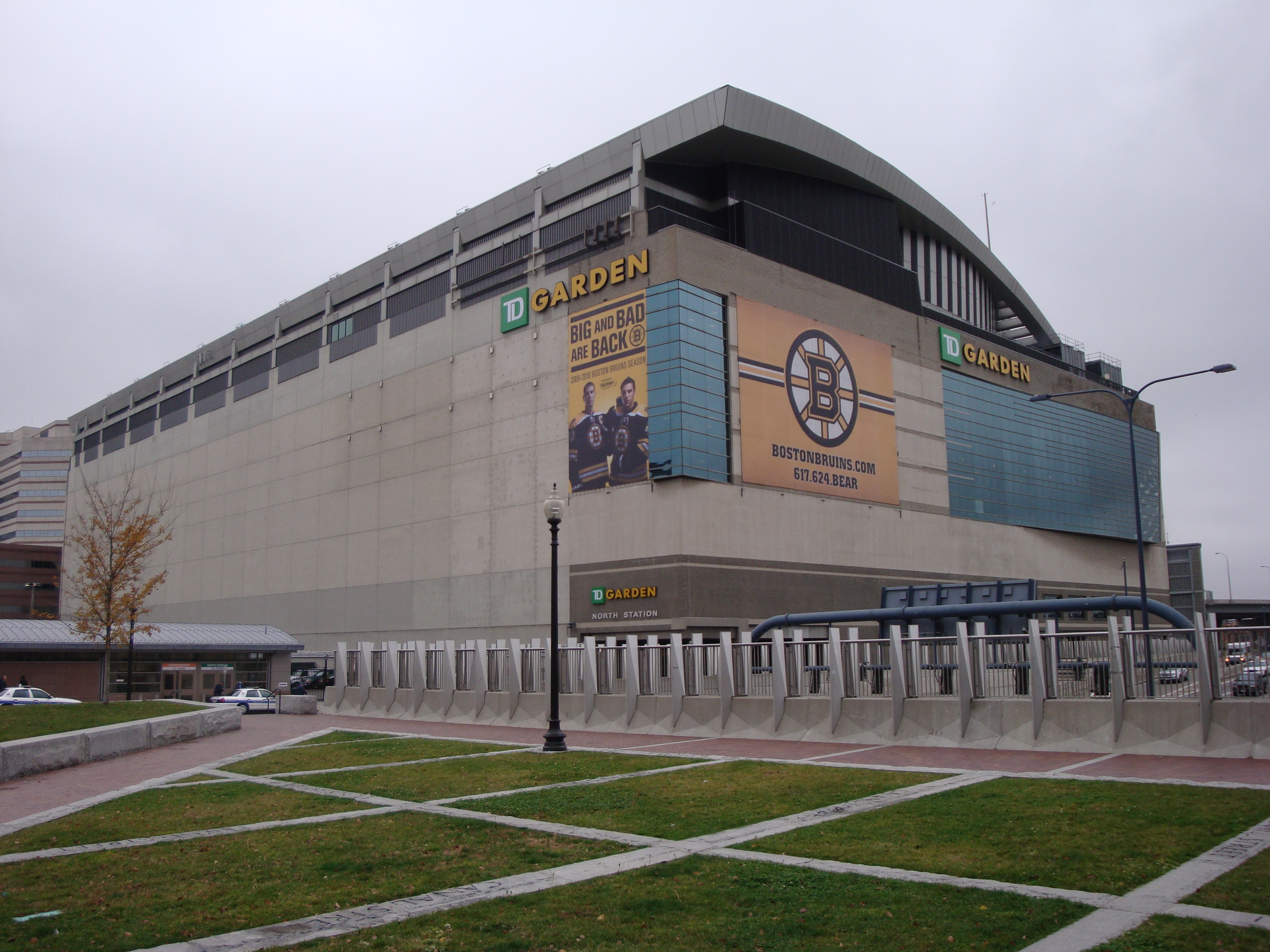
The 19th annual SummerSlam was held at the TD Banknorth Garden in Boston, Massachusetts.

SummerSlam is an annual professional wrestling pay-per-view (PPV) event produced every August by World Wrestling Entertainment (WWE) since 1988. Dubbed "The Biggest Party of the Summer", it is one of the promotion's original four pay-per-views, along with WrestleMania, Royal Rumble, and Survivor Series, referred to as the "Big Four". It has since become considered WWE's second biggest event of the year behind WrestleMania. The 19th SummerSlam was scheduled to be held on August 20, 2006, at the TD Banknorth Garden in Boston, Massachusetts and featured wrestlers from the Raw, SmackDown!, and ECW brand divisions. It was the first SummerSlam to include ECW, a relaunch of the former Extreme Championship Wrestling (ECW) promotion that became WWE's third brand in May, subsequently also being the first SummerSlam to feature the ECW World Championship. This also marked the first inter-brand pay-per-view event to include ECW.

=== Storylines ===
The main feud heading into SummerSlam on Raw was between WWE Champion Edge and John Cena. Edge won the title on the July 3 episode of Raw, defeating then-champion Rob Van Dam and Cena in a triple threat match. The following week on Raw, after defeating Shelton Benjamin, Cena attacked Edge, who was providing commentary for the match. Edge, however, fought off Cena and executed an Edgecution followed by a spear. Later that night, as part of the storyline, Cena attacked Edge and Lita, Edge's girlfriend, at their hotel. On the July 15 edition of Saturday Night's Main Event XXXIII, Cena faced off against Edge for the WWE Championship. Cena won the match by disqualification after Lita interfered and slapped the referee. Since a championship cannot change hands via countout or disqualification, Edge retained the title. After the match, Cena attacked Edge and performed an FU through a broadcast table. Three weeks later, on the July 31 episode of Raw, a match between Edge and Cena for the WWE Championship was booked for SummerSlam, with the stipulation that if Edge got himself counted out or intentionally disqualified, he would lose the WWE Championship. On August 14, Edge went to Cena's father's house in West Newbury, Massachusetts, and slapped him.

There's a line between business and personal. You don't cross that line, and what Edge did to my family was way, way over the line. For a sliver, for a millisecond, I respected Edge for being a very smart WWE Champion because not everybody kicks down the door of the saloon and wants to challenge everybody to a gunfight. I respect somebody who picks their spots, but after what happened this week...f*** him. I'll tell you, that sumbitch's plan really backfired on the psychological warfare, because I can guarantee you my dad and my brothers are going to be front row center looking on [at SummerSlam]. I know that they'll be right there. They are why I fight; they're the reason I go to war. The WWE Championship is everybody's prize, but the other reason that I fight is to provide my family with a better way of life

— John Cena commenting on Edge slapping his father.

The secondary feud on the Raw brand was between D-Generation X (DX) (Triple H and Shawn Michaels) and The McMahons (Vince McMahon and Shane McMahon). In December, Michaels interrupted Vince and told him that he should move on from the Montreal Incident. Vince responded by saying that he could screw Michaels like he did Bret Hart anytime he wanted. This led to a feud between Michaels and The McMahons which culminated in a No Holds Barred match at WrestleMania 22 between Michaels and Vince. Michaels won the match despite interference from The Spirit Squad and Shane. Vince claimed that Michaels' victory was a result of "divine intervention" and booked himself in a tag team match with Shane against Michaels and God at Backlash. The McMahons would win the match after interference from The Spirit Squad. Two weeks later, Michaels faced the Spirit Squad in a five on one handicap match and suffered a knee injury when the Spirit Squad crushed his knee with a steel chair. Triple H, who Vince recruited, was ordered to crush Michaels' skull with a sledgehammer. When Kenny, the leader of the Spirit Squad, took the sledgehammer away from Triple H and attempted to hit Michaels with it, Triple H stepped in front of Kenny who charged at Michaels but Triple H hit him with a spinebuster and attacked the Spirit Squad turning face for the first time since 2002. This led to Michaels and Triple H reforming DX for the first time since their teased reunion in 2002. DX defeated the Spirit Squad at Vengeance in a five on two handicap match. The next night on Raw, DX mocked the McMahons in one of their famous parodies and when The McMahons and the Spirit Squad came out to confront them they were covered with Manure. Three weeks later, Vince set up a tag team match between himself and Shane against DX at SummerSlam.

The main feud on the SmackDown! brand was between King Booker and Batista over the World Heavyweight Championship. In January, Batista legitimately tore his triceps and was forced to vacate the World Heavyweight Championship. At No Way Out the following month, Batista cut a promo claiming that when he returned from injury, he would become World Heavyweight Champion once again. Batista made his in-ring return five months later, on the edition of July 15 of'Saturday Night's Main Event XXXIII in a six-man tag team match. At The Great American Bash, King Booker defeated Rey Mysterio to win the World Heavyweight Championship, and Mr. Kennedy defeated Batista by disqualification. On the August 4 episode of SmackDown!, Batista defeated Kennedy and declined any congratulations until after he won back the World Heavyweight Championship. The following week, on SmackDown!, Batista thanked King Booker for holding onto "his" title and told him he would be needing it back at SummerSlam.

The main feud on ECW was between ECW World Champion Big Show and Sabu. On the July 25 episode of ECW, Sabu requested a title match against Big Show, but ECW Representative Paul Heyman denied his request. Later that night, after Big Show defeated Kane to retain the title, Sabu attacked Big Show with a steel chair. The next week, Heyman once again denied Sabu's request for the title match.

Big Show is ECW Champion now. That's a long term investment for us. You're all scarred up because you'll do anything to win. I can't subject Big Show to that.

— Paul Heyman's reasoning for denying Sabu's request.

In retaliation, Sabu attacked Big Show with a steel chair and executed an Arabian Facebuster, a diving leg drop with a chair. On the August 15 episode of ECW, Sabu faced Rob Van Dam in a ladder match, where whoever won would be face Big Show for the ECW World Championship. Sabu won the match, and Big Show came out and executed a chokeslam on both Sabu and Van Dam.

== Event ==
Other on-screen personnel
Role:	Name:
English commentators	Jim Ross (Raw)
English commentators	Jerry Lawler (Raw)
English commentators	Michael Cole (SmackDown!)
English commentators	John "Bradshaw" Layfield (SmackDown!)
English commentators	Joey Styles (ECW)
English commentators	Tazz (ECW)
Spanish commentators	Carlos Cabrera
Spanish commentators	Hugo Savinovich
Ring announcers	Lilian Garcia (Raw)
Ring announcers	Tony Chimel (SmackDown!)
Ring announcers	Justin Roberts (ECW)
Referees	Mike Chioda (Raw)
Referees	Jack Doan (Raw)
Referees	Chad Patton (Raw)
Referees	Nick Patrick (SmackDown!)
Referees	Charles Robinson (SmackDown!)
Referees	Mickie Henson (ECW)

=== Dark match ===
Before the event went live on pay-per-view, Carlito defeated Rob Conway in a dark match following a Backcracker.

=== Preliminary matches ===
The first match was Chavo Guerrero versus Rey Mysterio. Both men took control during the match. Vickie Guerrero interrupted the match and tried to stop both men from fighting. She pulled Chavo out of the ring and tried to stop him, but he kept on fighting. Vickie then tried to plead with Mysterio but accidentally shoved him off the ropes. Chavo took advantage by performing a frog splash on Mysterio for the victory.

The second match was an Extreme Rules match for the ECW World Championship between champion Big Show and Sabu. In the beginning, Sabu gained the advantage in the match as he threw chairs into Big Show's head and leapt off a chair to put Big Show head first through a table. As a result, Big Show began to bleed. After some back and forth action, Sabu took the upper hand as he performed a spike DDT on Big Show through a table. Big Show chokeslammed Sabu through a table for the victory.

The third match was between Hulk Hogan and Randy Orton. Orton took the advantage in the match, as he focused on Hogan's injured knee. The match saw Orton perform an RKO on Hogan. As Orton went for the pin, Hogan had his feet on the ropes. The referee did not see his feet and originally gave Orton the victory. Later, the referee saw that Hogan's feet were still on the ropes and restarted the match. Hogan won the match when he performed a leg drop on Orton for a pinfall victory. This was Hogan's last match in WWE.

The fourth match was an "I Quit" match between Ric Flair and Mick Foley. In the beginning, Foley stuffed his smelly gym sock, Mr. Socko, down Flair's gullet to apply the Mandible claw. Flair nearly passed out from the sock’s foul smell, but since the match was an “I Quit” match, Foley was unable to capitalize. The ring was surrounded by many hardcore objects, including Foley's signature bag of thumbtacks. Flair was thrown into these objects several times. He managed to hit Foley with a baseball bat wrapped in barbed wire. When Foley got up, Flair charged him over the top rope onto a trashcan. Foley was unconscious until Melina, Foley's friend, came with officials to check him. Foley was unable to continue, so the referee rang the bell, giving Flair the victory. Flair said that the match cannot end until Foley quits, and continued the assault. Melina came down to save Foley, and eventually threw in the towel on Foley's behalf. Flair insisted on continuing the match until Foley quit. Flair continued to assault Foley with the barbed wire bat. Melina laid in between Flair and Foley, and as Flair was ready to hit Melina with the bat, Foley quit the match and gave Flair the victory to protect Melina.

=== Main event matches ===
The fifth match was for the World Heavyweight Championship between Batista and the champion King Booker. During the match, King Booker set Batista up for the scissors kick, but as he performed the move, Batista countered it into a suplex powerslam. Batista tried a Batista Bomb, but Queen Sharmell interfered by attacking Batista as he tried to lift King Booker. As a result, King Booker was disqualified, so Batista won the match but not the title because a title cannot change hands by disqualification.

The sixth match was a tag team match between D-Generation X (DX) (Shawn Michaels and Triple H) and The McMahons (Vince and Shane). Before the beginning of the match, the Spirit Squad interfered on the behalf of the McMahons but were tossed out by DX until Finlay, William Regal, Mr. Kennedy, and The Big Show interfered. Triple H controlled the first three, while Michaels fought Big Show, who chokeslammed Triple H through a broadcast table. The match officially began as the McMahons took advantage and performed several tag team moves on DX, including the Hart Attack and the Doomsday Device. Shane tried to pin Michaels, but Michaels kicked out of the move and got up. He clotheslined Shane and tagged in Triple H. The McMahons were knocked to the floor, but Umaga interfered as the final man on the behalf of the McMahons. Armando Alejandro Estrada distracted the referee while Umaga delivered the Samoan Spike to Triple H. He also tried a Samoan Spike on Michaels, but Kane came to prevent Umaga from attacking DX by chasing him away. Vince tried to take advantage of Umaga's attack by pinning Triple H, but Triple H kicked out of the cover. Vince attacked the referee and then put a trash can on the face of Triple H, who was lying in the corner. Shane tried a Coast-To-Coast on Triple H, but Michaels performed Sweet Chin Music on Shane. Vince tried to rescue his son, but a trash can was smashed on his head by Triple H. Michaels superkicked Vince, who went straight into Triple H's Pedigree for DX's pinfall victory.

The main event was between Edge and John Cena for the WWE Championship. In this match, the stipulation was that if Edge got disqualified, he would lose the title to Cena. During the match, Cena used several blows and slams on Edge. He also performed a belly-to-belly suplex on Edge and kept an eye on Edge's valet, the WWE Women's Champion Lita. Edge took advantage and connected with chokeholds and a flying clothesline, but Cena was able to recover. Lita tried to interfere, but Edge warned her not to get him disqualified. Lita threw a steel chair into the ring, but Edge threw it back outside the ring, and Cena took advantage. Cena then applied the STFU on Edge. Lita tried to interfere again, but Edge warned her once again. Edge made it to the ropes, and while the referee told Cena to break the hold, Lita handed Edge a pair of brass knuckles. As Cena broke the hold, Cena put Edge on his shoulders again for the FU, but this time Lita jumped on Edge's back when Cena had Edge set up for the FU, and Lita was the recipient of the FU instead of Edge. Edge then jumped off of Cena's back and hit Cena in the back of the head with the brass knuckles to win the match and retain his championship.

== Aftermath ==
Edge and John Cena continued to feud over the WWE Championship. On the August 21 episode of Raw, Lita threw John Cena's "Spinner WWE Championship" belt into the Long Island Sound and Edge unveiled his own "Rated R-Spinner WWE Championship" belt. Jeff Hardy returned to WWE on the Raw brand and defeated Edge in a non-title match by disqualification. After the match, Cena attacked Edge, and threw Edge into the Long Island Sound. On the August 28 episode, Cena challenged Edge for the WWE Championship with the stipulation being that if Cena lost, he would not challenge for the title again and would leave Raw to go back to SmackDown!. Edge accepted the challenge, stating that the match would take place in his hometown and it would be a match that Edge had never lost: a Tables, Ladders and Chairs match. Later that night, Cena faced the returning Chris Masters in a match; Masters was disqualified when Edge attacked Cena. At Unforgiven, Cena defeated Edge, winning his third WWE Championship. Cena went on to hold the title for over a year.

King Booker and Batista also continued to feud over the World Heavyweight Championship. On the August 25 episode of SmackDown!, Batista and Bobby Lashley defeated King Booker, Finlay and William Regal in a 3-on-2 handicap match. On the September 8 episode, Batista faced King Booker in a SummerSlam rematch for the World Heavyweight Championship, which he lost due to interference by Finlay. The next week, Lashley became the number one contender to the World Heavyweight Championship by defeating Finlay, as Batista was scheduled to face Finlay. On the October 6 episode of SmackDown!, Batista and Lashley faced off against each other, but the match ended in a no contest after Finlay and King Booker interfered. SmackDown General Manager Theodore Long then scheduled a fatal four-way match for the World Heavyweight Championship at No Mercy. At No Mercy, King Booker retained the World Heavyweight Championship.

The feud between DX and the McMahons continued the following night with DX vandalizing Vince McMahon's $30 million private jet, the world headquarters to WWE, and even ripped the rear axle off of Vince McMahon's private limo with the use of a chain with all 3 being spray painted with the words DX. The next week on Raw, DX took on Mr. Kennedy, William Regal, and Finlay in a 2 on 3 handicap match, after the match, Big Show, Shane and Vince McMahon came out and attacked DX, this led to a 2 on 3 handicap Hell in a Cell match at Unforgiven.

Chavo Guerrero and Rey Mysterio continued to feud. On the August 25 episode of SmackDown!, Vickie Guerrero apologized to Mysterio and Chavo Guerrero for getting involved in their match; however, Vickie later turned heel by attacking Mysterio with a steel chair and aligning with her nephew, Chavo, becoming his new business manager.

== Results ==
No.	Results	Stipulations	Times
1^{D}	Carlito defeated Rob Conway by pinfall	Singles match	6:40
2	Chavo Guerrero defeated Rey Mysterio by pinfall	Singles match	11:01
3	Big Show (c) defeated Sabu by pinfall	Extreme Rules match for the ECW World Championship	8:31
4	Hulk Hogan defeated Randy Orton by pinfall	Singles match	10:57
5	Ric Flair defeated Mick Foley	"I Quit" match	13:14
6	Batista defeated King Booker (c) (with Queen Sharmell) by disqualification	Singles match for the World Heavyweight Championship	10:26
7	D-Generation X (Shawn Michaels and Triple H) defeated Mr. McMahon and Shane McMahon by pinfall	Tag team match	13:01
8	Edge (c) (with Lita) defeated John Cena by pinfall	Singles match for the WWE Championship; Had Edge been disqualified, he would have lost the championship.	15:41
(c) / – the champion(s) heading into the match; D / – this was a dark match
