= Aanch =

- Directed by: Rajesh Singh
- Screenplay by: Kamal Pandey
- Produced by: B. L. Saboo; Poonam Jhawer
- Starring: Nana Patekar; Paresh Rawal; Suchindra; Sharbani Mukherjee; Seema Shinde
- Cinematography: Damodar Naidu
- Music by: Sanjeev Darshan
- Release date: 28 November 2003
- Running time: 160 min.
- Country: India
- Language: Hindi

Aanch is a 2003 Hindi language drama film directed by Rajesh Kumar Singh. Nana Patekar, Paresh Rawal, Suchindra Bali (in his Hindi debut) and Sharbani Mukherjee played the lead roles.

== Plot ==
Mahadev Thakur (Nana Patekar) and Jawahar Pandit (Paresh Rawal) belong to two different villages, Mandaur and Amirpur, respectively. They hate each other for reasons best known to them. Diwakar (Suchindra Bali) is a carefree guy whose father (residing in Amirpur) and Vidya's (Sharbani Mukherjee) brother Shiva (Deepraj Rana) (a resident of Mandaur) decide to get Diwakar and Vidya married.

The preparations for the marriage ceremony begin, and neither the boy nor the girl know what the other looks like. In the meantime, the two villages get ready to confront each other in case of a quarrel. The wedding ceremony is underway when the rivalry between the two village heads and the roar of the guns starts. The bride and the groom come separately to the town for studies, oblivious to each other. They are happy to escape the brutal world of rural India to find their own careers and future. They first bump into each other in the train while on their way to the town, then in the college, completely unaware of all facts. For Diwakar, it is love at first sight, but Vidya does not respond to his overtures. Later, she packs her bags and heads straight for her village, Mandaur. In the meantime, Diwakar learns that Vidya is his legally wedded wife, and he decides to get her back from the clutches of two warring villages. It is not easy for them to unite since both village heads, Mahadev and Jawahar, and their coteries object to their uniting due to bitter hatred. They do unite ultimately, but after a lot of bloodbath and struggle.

== Cast ==
Actor/Actress	Character
Arun Bakshi	Shambhu, Vidya's father
Suchindra Bali	Diwakar
Poonam Jhawer	Lata K. Thakur
Ayesha Jhulka	Devangi M. Thakur
Akhilendra Mishra	Kallu Pandit
Sharbani Mukherji	Vidya
Nirmal Pandey	Kirti Thakur
Nana Patekar	Mahadev Thakur
Vishwajeet Pradhan	Jawahar's eldest son
Deep Raj Rana	Shiva, Vidya's brother
Paresh Rawal	Jawahar Pandit
Rakhi Sawant	Dancer at the wedding in a special appearance
Raghuvir Yadav	Chilkona
Seema Shinde	Vidya's cousin

== Soundtrack ==
#	Title	Singer(s)	notes
1	"Dil Ke Arma Tarse"	Sonu Nigam, Mahalakshmi Iyer	
2	"Lehron Se Khalen Hai Payal"	Alka Yagnik, Kumar Sanu	
3	"Sada Suhagan"	Anuradha Paudwal, Chandana Dixit	
4	"Tapki Jaye"	Richa Sharma	Rakhi Sawant as a Dancer
5	"Mera Dil Chura"	Udit Narayan	
6	"Sun Meri Rani"	Nana Patekar, Poonam Jhawer	

== Release ==
The film was initially scheduled to release on Diwali 2003.
