= Kushti (film) =

2010 film by T. K. Rajeev Kumar

- Theatrical release poster
- Directed by: T. K. Rajeev Kumar
- Produced by: Girish Jain
- Starring: Rajpal Yadav; Dalip Singh Rana; Om Puri; Sharat Saxena; Manoj Joshi; Nargis Bagheri
- Cinematography: Madhu Neelakandan
- Edited by: B. Ajithkumar
- Music by: Sreenivas; Sharreth
- Distributed by: Venus Records & Tapes
- Release date: 14 May 2010
- Running time: 121 minutes
- Country: India
- Language: Hindi

Kushti (transl. Wrestling) is a 2010 Indian sports comedy film directed by T. K. Rajeev Kumar. The film stars Rajpal Yadav in the lead role, along with the WWE wrestler The Great Khali (Dalip Singh Rana) making his Bollywood debut. The film also stars Manoj Joshi, Om Puri and Sharat Saxena in supporting roles. The film is a remake of the 1985 Malayalam film Mutharamkunnu P. O.

== Plot ==
The film Kushti is the story of a small village in Northern India where wrestling is a popular sport and an important wrestling match is held every year. Every year rivals Avtar Singh and Jiten Singh try to beat each other in the wrestling match and gain the trusteeship of the village. Chander plays the roles of a village simpleton and a postmaster.

It is filled with misunderstandings and misconceptions of hidden identities and secret love affairs, and the outcome is simply hilarious. The movie begins to take a turn when a certain someone delivers a secret package in the wrong hands. Especially someone who is bound to take advantage and manipulate the real owner of the package.

Avtar Singh has a young and beautiful daughter named Laadli, with whom Chander is madly in love. To get her father's approval for their marriage, he was to first prove his prowess by wrestling with the 7 and a half-foot tall "Rama Krishna." The condition set by Avtar Singh is that Chander has to defeat "Khali" in the wrestling match.

== Cast ==
- Rajpal Yadav as Chander
- Dalip Singh Rana as Himself
- Nargis Bagheri as Laadli
- Sharat Saxena as Avtar Singh
- Asrani as Janak Lal
- Manoj Joshi as Kripashankar
- Om Puri as Jiten Singh
- Jagadeesh as Puncher Pappu
- Razak Khan as Chander's friend
- Ramesh Pisharody as Sinterklaas
- Asif Basra as Duliya ram (Post Master)

== Soundtrack ==
Kushti

Soundtrack album by Sreenivas and Sharreth
- Released: 29 April 2010
- Genre: Feature film soundtrack
- Label: Venus Records & Tapes

The music of Kushti is composed by Srinivas, Tauseef Akhtar, AD Boyz and Hriju Roy. The lyrics were done by Sameer. The movie has 5 original songs.

Song	Singer(s)	Length
"Rang Rasiya"	Anuradha Sriram, Tauseef Akhtar	4:37
"Dangal"	Srinivas, Shreya Ghoshal	4:58
"Kar Kar Kushti Kar"	AD Boyz	3:09
"Hanuman Chalisa"	Ravi Choudhary	3:41
"Dekho Mere Gaon Mein"	Abhijeet Bhattacharya	3:38

== Critical reception ==
Kushti received mixed reviews, but mostly negative.
