= Dhiraina =

- Town
- Location in Himachal Pradesh, India Dhiraina (India)
- Coordinates: 30°45′6″N 77°40′4″E
- Country: India
- State: Himachal Pradesh
- District: Sirmaur
- Gram panchayat: Naini Dhar

Languages
  - Official: Hindi
  - Regional: Sirmauri
- Time zone: UTC+5:30 (IST)

Dhiraina is a small town in Sirmaur district, the Himachal Pradesh state of North India.

== Notable residents ==
- Professional wrestler, WWE World Heavyweight Champion Dalip Singh, better known as The Great Khali, was born in this village.
