= Devudu =

- Theatrical release poster
- Directed by: Ravi Raja Pinisetty
- Written by: G. Satyamurthy (dialogues)
- Screenplay by: Ravi Raja Pinisetty
- Story by: Janardhan Maharshi
- Produced by: A. Gopinath; M. Venkatrao; C. Krishna Rao
- Starring: Nandamuri Balakrishna; Ramya Krishna; Ruchita Prasad
- Cinematography: V. S. R. Swamy
- Edited by: Siva; Krishna Murthy
- Music by: Sirpy
- Production company: Sri Chitra Creations
- Release date: 23 October 1997
- Running time: 157 minutes
- Country: India
- Language: Telugu

Devudu (transl. God) is a 1997 Telugu-language drama film directed and co-written by Ravi Raja Pinisetty. It stars Nandamuri Balakrishna, Ramya Krishna, and Ruchita Prasad with music composed by Sirpy. A. Gopinath, M. Venkatrao and C. Krishna Rao produced the film under the Sri Chitra Creations banner.

== Plot ==
The film opens with a couple abandoning their newborn baby at a temple near a village, unable to witness his death due to a congenital abnormality. However, the child miraculously survives, blessed by the Goddess. Rayudu, a compassionate leader of the region, adopts the child and names him Devudu. Over the years, Devudu grows into a naive yet kind-hearted young man, beloved by the entire village. Despite his popularity, he harbors a fear of marriage, believing that it was the cause of his parents’ abandonment. Meanwhile, Ganga Raju, who resents Rayudu for ostracizing his brother Linga Raju over his second marriage, seeks revenge.

During a visit to the city, Devudu rescues Madhavi from a group of goons, and they become friends. Around the same time, Sarweswara Rao, an MLA seeking re-election, approaches Rayudu for support. Rayudu declines due to Sarweswara Rao's declining reputation. In retaliation, Sarweswara Rao orchestrates a plot by sending his daughter, Santhi, to Rayudu’s home under the guise of seeking shelter, secretly intending to manipulate the situation to his advantage. Unaware of her father's plans, Santhi grows fond of Devudu, impressed by his innocence and virtuous nature.

After winning the election, Sarweswara Rao fails to honor his promises. When the village decides to punish Santhi for perceived dishonor, Devudu takes her to the city. Santhi eventually learns the truth about her father’s deceit and confronts him, forcing him to admit that he used her for political gains. In a turn of events, Santhi compels Devudu to tie a sacred wedding chain around her neck to protect her dignity. Devudu, unaware of its significance, complies, believing it to be a divine locket.

The narrative takes a twist when it is revealed that Madhavi is Sarweswara Rao’s other daughter, a fact unknown to the public. Santhi and Devudu devise a plan to expose Sarweswara Rao and bring Madhavi back to the village. Madhavi, upon realizing her father’s malice, reconciles with Santhi and willingly returns.

Sarweswara Rao, now aspiring to become Chief Minister, strikes a deal with MLA Pundarikakshayya to marry Madhavi to the latter's son. He sends his henchmen to retrieve Madhavi and eliminate Devudu. In a bid to protect Madhavi, Devudu ties a wedding chain to her, complicating matters further. Accused of bigamy by Ganga Raju, Devudu faces a village panchayat. However, the villagers rally behind him, affirming his integrity.

As the conflict escalates, Sarweswara Rao kidnaps Rayudu and Madhavi, attempting to forcefully marry Madhavi off. Devudu, guided by divine intervention, confronts Sarweswara Rao and his men. In the climactic battle, Santhi sacrifices her life to save Devudu, ensuring his union with Madhavi. The film concludes with Devudu fulfilling his destiny, bringing justice and peace to the village.

== Cast ==
- Nandamuri Balakrishna as Devudu
- Ramya Krishna as Santhi
- Ruchita Prasad as Madhavi
- Satyanarayana as Rayudu
- Allu Ramalingaiyah as Babu Rao
- Atluti Pundarikakshayya as M. L. A. Pundarikakshayya
- Kota Srinivasa Rao as Ganga Raju
- Raja Krishna Murthy as M. L. A. Sarweswara Rao
- Kazan Khan as Sarweswara Rao's brother-in-law
- Maharshi Raghava as Pundarikakshayya's Son
- Sivaji Raja as Bangaru Raju
- Narayana Rao as Surayya
- Visweswara Rao as Shocko Shekar
- Junior Relangi as Kavi
- Annapurna as Durgamma
- Rama Prabha as Babu Rao's wife
- Sana as Lakshmi
- Raja Kumari as Rani
- Y. Vijaya as Ganga Raju's wife

== Soundtrack ==
Devudu

Film score by Sirpy
- Released: 1997
- Genre: Soundtrack
- Length: 28:45
- Label: T-Series

Music composed by Sirpy. Music released on T-Series Music Company.

| No. | Title | Lyrics | Singer(s) | Length |
|---|---|---|---|---|
| 1. | "Ra Chilaka Kulukula" | Sirivennela Sitarama Sastry | Mano, Chitra, Anuradha Sriram | 4:40 |
| 2. | "Tana Antu Nanu" | Sirivennela Sitarama Sastry | Mano, Chitra | 5:13 |
| 3. | "Made in India" | Bhuvanachandra | Mano, Chitra, Gopika Poornima | 4:52 |
| 4. | "Epakka Chusina" | Sirivennela Sitarama Sastry | S. P. Balasubrahmanyam, Chitra | 4:54 |
| 5. | "Gullo Ramayyo" | Sirivennela Sitarama Sastry | Mano, Chitra | 4:50 |
| 6. | "Ra Ro Ranganna" | Sirivennela Sitarama Sastry | S. P. Balasubrahmanyam, Chitra, Sujatha | 4:16 |
| Total length: | | | | 28:45 |

== Reception ==
The film was reviewed by Zamin Ryot. A critic from Andhra Today wrote, "Devudu is yet another meaningless movie with the pranks of a mentally immature person. The role is very uninspiring and is sure to disappoint Bala Krishna's fans".
