= Unforgiven (2006) =

World Wrestling Entertainment pay-per-view event

- Promotional poster featuring John Cena
- Promotion: World Wrestling Entertainment
- Brand: Raw
- Date: September 17, 2006
- City: Toronto, Ontario, Canada
- Venue: Air Canada Centre
- Attendance: 16,105
- Buy rate: 289,000

Pay-per-view chronology
| ← Previous; SummerSlam | Next → No Mercy |

Unforgiven chronology
| ← Previous; 2005 | Next → 2007 |

WWE in Canada chronology
| ← Previous; SummerSlam | Next → Breaking Point |

The 2006 Unforgiven was a professional wrestling pay-per-view (PPV) event produced by the American promotion World Wrestling Entertainment (WWE). It was the ninth annual Unforgiven and took place on September 17, 2006, at the Air Canada Centre in Toronto, Ontario, Canada, held exclusively for wrestlers from the promotion's Raw brand division. This was the only Unforgiven held outside of the United States and it was the final Unforgiven to be brand-exclusive as following WrestleMania 23 the following year, brand-exclusive PPVs were discontinued.

The main event was a Tables, Ladders, and Chairs match for the WWE Championship between Edge and John Cena, which Cena won after retrieving the belt suspended above the ring. One of the predominant matches on the card was D-Generation X (DX) (Triple H and Shawn Michaels) versus Big Show, Vince McMahon, and Shane McMahon in a Handicap Hell in a Cell match. Triple H and Michaels won the match after Triple H pinned Vince following a sledgehammer shot to his back. Another primary match on the undercard was Lita versus Trish Stratus for the WWE Women's Championship in what was Stratus' final match of her full-time wrestling career. Stratus won the match after forcing Lita to submit to the sharpshooter, thus becoming a record-setting seven-time WWE Women's Champion.

As many of the existing feuds ended following the event, some did not. Notably, Jeff Hardy continued to feud with Johnny Nitro, facing off against him for the WWE Intercontinental Championship throughout September. The feud between DX and The McMahons ended after the event, as DX began an angle with Edge and Randy Orton. Following his win against Edge, Cena began an angle with Kevin Federline, which started the following month at Cyber Sunday and lasted throughout the year.

== Production ==
=== Background ===
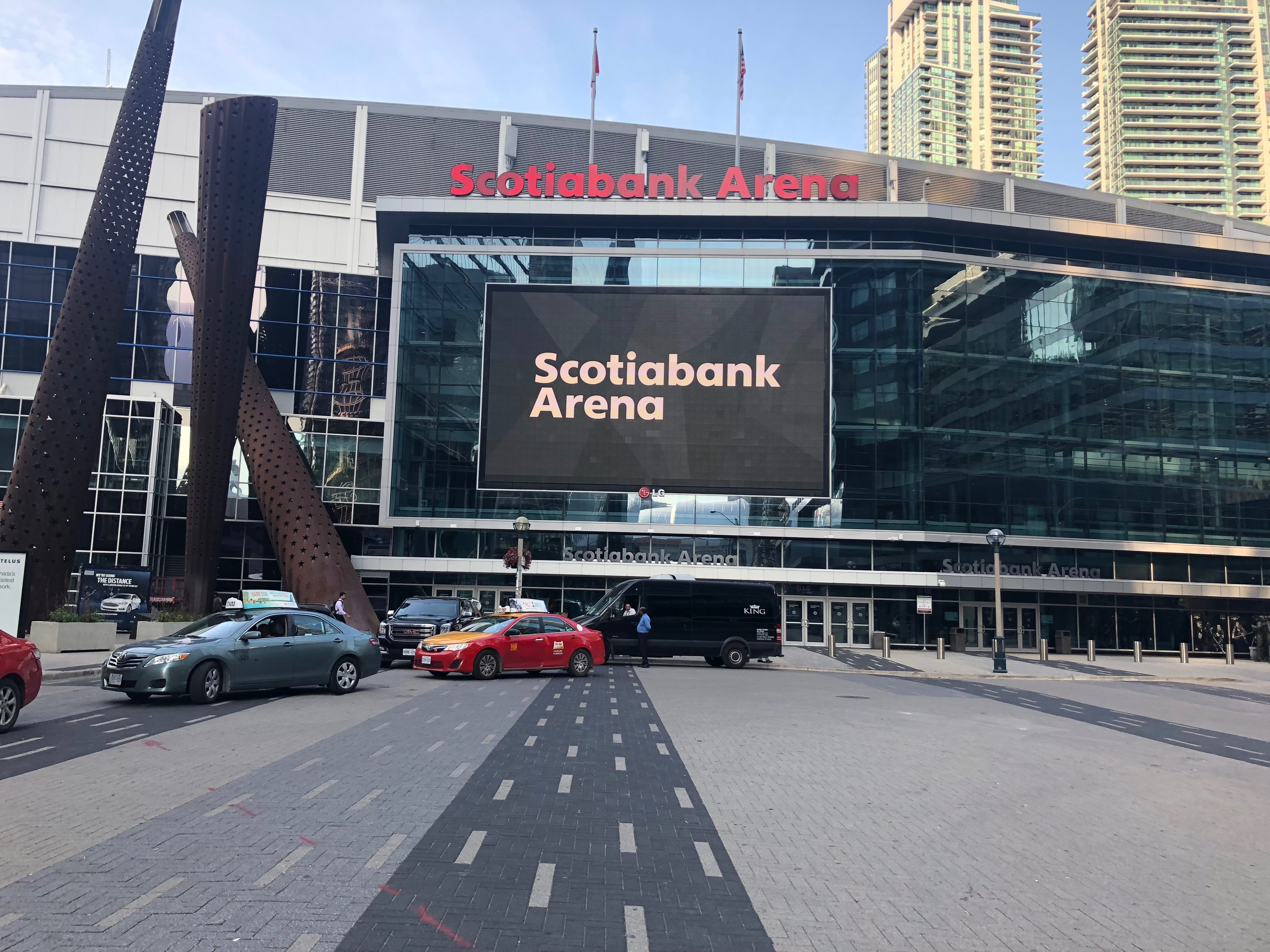
The ninth annual Unforgiven was held at the Air Canada Centre in Toronto, Ontario, Canada.

Unforgiven was an annual professional wrestling pay-per-view (PPV) event first held by the American promotion World Wrestling Entertainment (WWE) as the 21st In Your House PPV event in April 1998. Following the discontinuation of the In Your House series in February 1999, Unforgiven continued as its own PPV event in September that year, becoming WWE's annual September PPV. The ninth event took place on September 17, 2006, at the Air Canada Centre in Toronto, Ontario, Canada. Like the previous three years's events, it featured wrestlers exclusively from the Raw brand.

=== Storylines ===
The event featured seven professional wrestling matches with different wrestlers involved in pre-existing scripted feuds, plots and storylines. All wrestlers belonged to the Raw brand – a storyline division in which WWE assigned its employees to a different program, the other being SmackDown!.

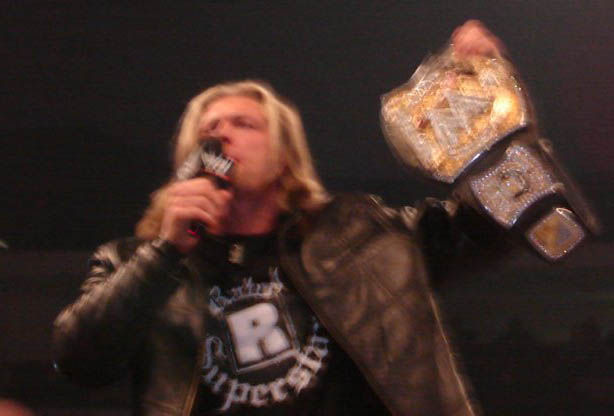
WWE Champion Edge feuded with John Cena prior to Unforgiven

The main feud heading into Unforgiven was between Edge and John Cena over the WWE Championship. The two were evenly matched, with one victory each. Cena defeated Edge by disqualification at Saturday Night's Main Event XXXIII, and Edge had beaten Cena at SummerSlam to retain his championship. On the edition of August 21, 2006 of Raw, Lita, Edge's girlfriend, threw Cena's customized belt, which had a spinning center plate of the WWE logo, into the Long Island Sound. Afterwards, Edge proclaimed that it was the end of the "Cena era" in his life. Edge went on to unveil a new version of the belt, which had a spinning center plate of his "Rated-R Superstar" logo. Later in the evening, Edge had a match with the returning Jeff Hardy; however, the match ended in a no-contest after Cena interfered and attacked Edge. After the match, the two fought outside the arena, and Cena tossed Edge into the Long Island Sound. On the edition of August 28, 2006 of Raw, Edge demanded that Shane McMahon, who was in charge of Raw that night, fire Cena for his actions the week before. Cena, however, interrupted and told Edge that if he got another WWE Championship match and lost, he would sign a multi-year contract with SmackDown! and leave Edge's life. Edge agreed, but on the condition that he decided when, where, and what type of match it would be. After Cena defeated Chris Masters later that night, Edge hit Cena with a chair, a ladder, and later put him through a table. Following his attack, Edge told Cena that the match was going to be a Tables, Ladders, and Chairs match at Unforgiven in his hometown of Toronto, Ontario.

The other main match on the card was D-Generation X (DX) (Triple H and Shawn Michaels) versus The McMahons (Vince and Shane) and The Big Show in a Hell in a Cell match. At SummerSlam, DX defeated The McMahons in a tag team match. On the edition of August 21, 2006 of Raw, as part of the storyline, DX vandalized WWE's headquarters and Vince McMahon's personal jet plane and limousine. On the edition of August 28 of Raw, The McMahons viciously attacked DX after their 3-on-2 handicap match with their SummerSlam opponents, Mr. Kennedy, Finlay and William Regal. But before Vince and Shane proceeded to attack DX, Big Show attacked DX, giving the advantage to The McMahons. Moments after the assault, Vince booked a match at Unforgiven, where he teamed up with Shane and Big Show to take on DX in a 3-on-2 handicap Hell in a Cell match.

One of the main undercard matches was between Lita and Trish Stratus for the WWE Women's Championship. Lita engaged herself in a feud with Trish Stratus, after Lita and Edge interrupted Stratus' title match with Mickie James. Lita and Edge then went on to attack Stratus', only to involve Carlito, who was in an on-screen relationship with Stratus, to brawl with Lita and Edge. A scheduled tag team match between Lita and Edge versus Stratus and Carlito occurred, in which Edge and Lita were the winners. On the edition of August 28, 2006 of Raw, Lita revealed that Stratus would retire following Unforgiven, which was later confirmed by Stratus. On the edition of September 4 of Raw, Stratus challenged Lita to a match at Unforgiven for the WWE Women's title, for her retirement match, in which Lita accepted.

== Event ==
Other on-screen personnel
| Role: | Name: |
|---|---|
| English commentators | Jim Ross |
| English commentators | Jerry Lawler |
| Spanish commentators | Carlos Cabrera |
| Spanish commentators | Hugo Savinovich |
| Ring announcer | Lilian Garcia |
| Referees | Mike Chioda |
| Referees | Marty Rubalcaba |
| Referees | Chad Patton |
| Referees | Jack Doan |

The event unofficially began with a dark match between Super Crazy and Shelton Benjamin. Crazy pinned Benjamin for the win.

=== Preliminary matches ===
The first match was between Jeff Hardy and Johnny Nitro for the Intercontinental Championship. In the start of the match, Hardy gained the advantage over Nitro by countering his attacks. Hardy performed the Swanton Bomb, but Nitro put his foot on the rope to break a pinfall attempt. Melina, however, hit Hardy with her boot, and Nitro pinned Hardy and retained the title.

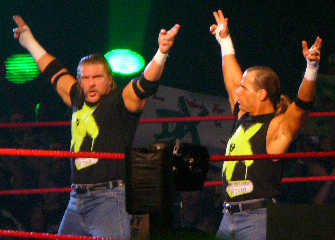
D-Generation X (Triple H and Shawn Michaels) were scheduled in a handicap Hell in a Cell match

The match that followed was between Kane and Umaga. The match was taken to the outside of the ring. Kane performed a clothesline on Umaga into the crowd for a double countout called by the referee. The third match was for the World Tag Team Championship between the Spirit Squad (Kenny and Mikey) and The Highlanders. back and forth action was seen by both teams. The members of the Squad, who were at ringside, interfered in the match and gave the upper hand to their teammates, as Mikey was able to pin Rory after a Facebuster, thus able to retain the World Tag Team Championship.

=== Main event matches ===
In the next match, Big Show, Shane McMahon and Vince McMahon faced D-Generation X (Triple H and Shawn Michaels) (DX) in a Handicap Hell in a Cell match. At first, DX got the upper hand over the McMahons and Big Show. Back and forth action occurred between the teams. During the match, Triple H wrapped a chair around Shane's neck and Michaels dropped an elbow onto the chair, injuring Shane. Michaels proceeded to perform Sweet Chin Music on Big Show, causing him to dangle over the top rope. DX then pulled Big Show's trunks down and shoved Vince's head up Big Show's buttocks. Michaels performed a second Sweet Chin Music on Vince, followed by Triple H hitting him in the back with a sledgehammer and covering him for the win. Following the match, both Shane and Vince were stretchered out of the ring.

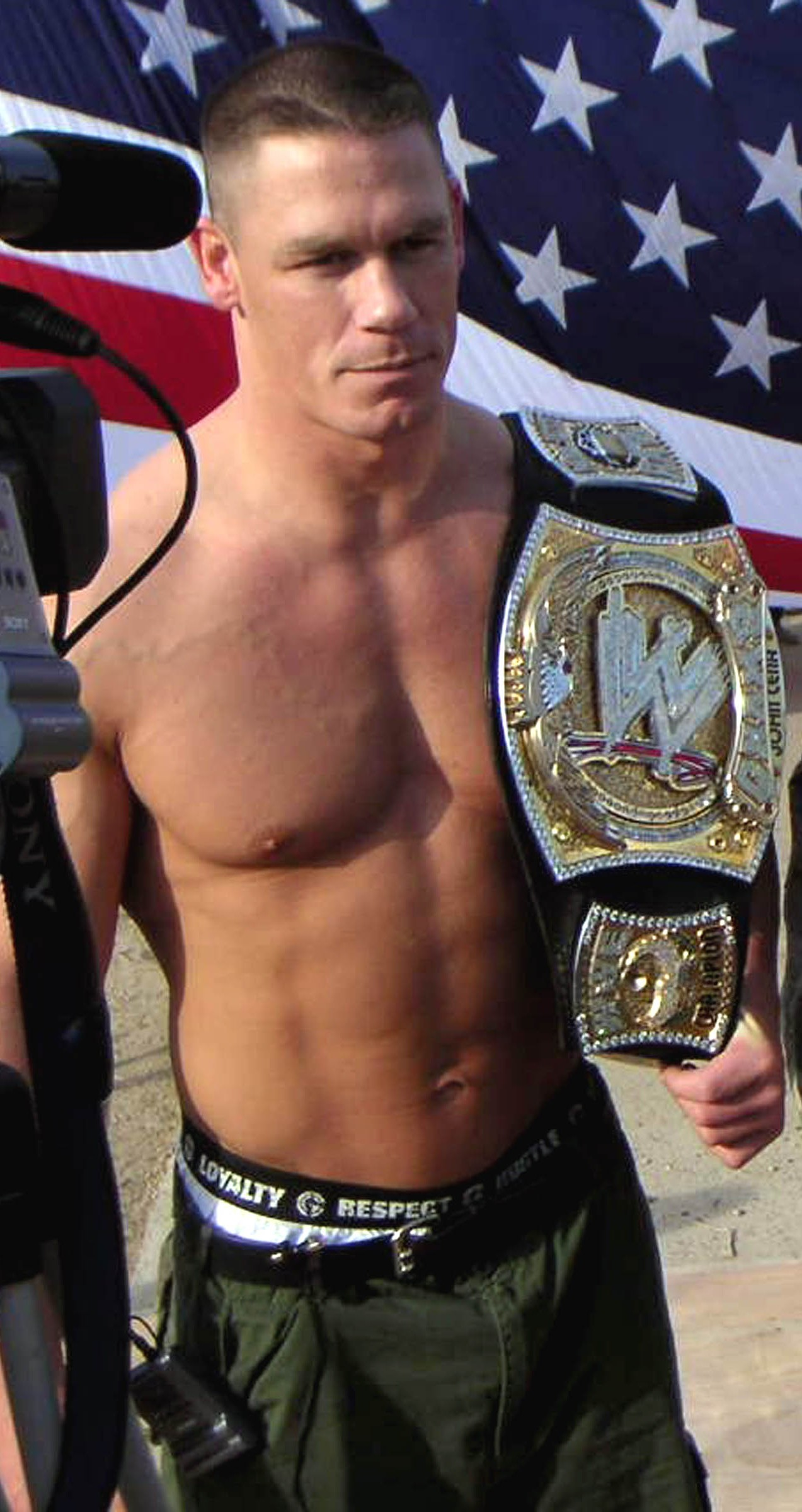
John Cena defeated Edge to become WWE Champion

The next singles match was between Trish Stratus and Lita for the WWE Women's Championship in Stratus' last match as a full-time competitor. Stratus gained control early in the match, but Lita took it from her after she threw her from the top rope. Stratus won the match after she locked in the Sharpshooter on Lita, who submitted to the move, and Stratus became Women's Champion for the last time in her career.

In the sixth match, Randy Orton faced Carlito. As the match began, Carlito spat on Orton and momentarily was followed by a dropkick. Mid-way in the match, Carlito performed a springboard moonsault from each side of the ring. His elbow caught Orton in the mouth on the second moonsault causing Orton to bleed from the mouth. After back-and-forth action, Carlito attempted another springboard, only for Orton to counter it into a mid-air RKO for the win.

In the main event, Edge faced John Cena in a Tables, Ladders, and Chairs match for the WWE Championship. The match stipulation added that if Cena lost to Edge, Cena would move to the SmackDown! brand. At the start, Cena took the advantage over Edge. Edge, however, countered Cena's moves with a neckbreaker. The match saw Cena sandwich Edge in a ladder as he applied the STFU on Edge, to which Edge submitted. At one point, Cena began to climb the ladder, but as he was moments away from retrieving the title, Lita, who interfered on Edge's behalf, tipped the ladder over, making Cena fall off the ladder through a table at ringside. Lita's interference was short, as Cena would later recover, and as Edge was climbing the ladder, Lita hit Cena with a steel chair to the back, only for him to inadvertently fall towards and push the ladder, making Edge fall off the ladder through a table at ringside. Lita then received an FU off Cena. Cena then began to make his way up the ladder, as did Edge when he re-entered the ring. The two fought until Cena performed an FU on Edge off the ladder through two stacked tables. Cena then grabbed the belt to win the WWE Championship for a third time.

== Reception ==
The event received mostly positive reviews from critics. Writing for Canadian Online Explorer, Brian Elliott stated that the event was "a card of averages, with nothing excellent and little poor". He rated the overall event 7 out 10 stars. The main event between Edge and John Cena for the WWE Championship was rated 9 out of 10 stars, the Hell in a Cell match was rated 9 and a half out of 10 with the Sun saying it was an extreme bloodbath that lived up to its hype, the World Tag Team Championship between the Spirit Squad and the Highlanders was rated a 5 out of 10 stars, and the Intercontinental Championship match between Johnny Nitro and Jeff Hardy was rated a 7 out of 10 stars.

== Aftermath ==
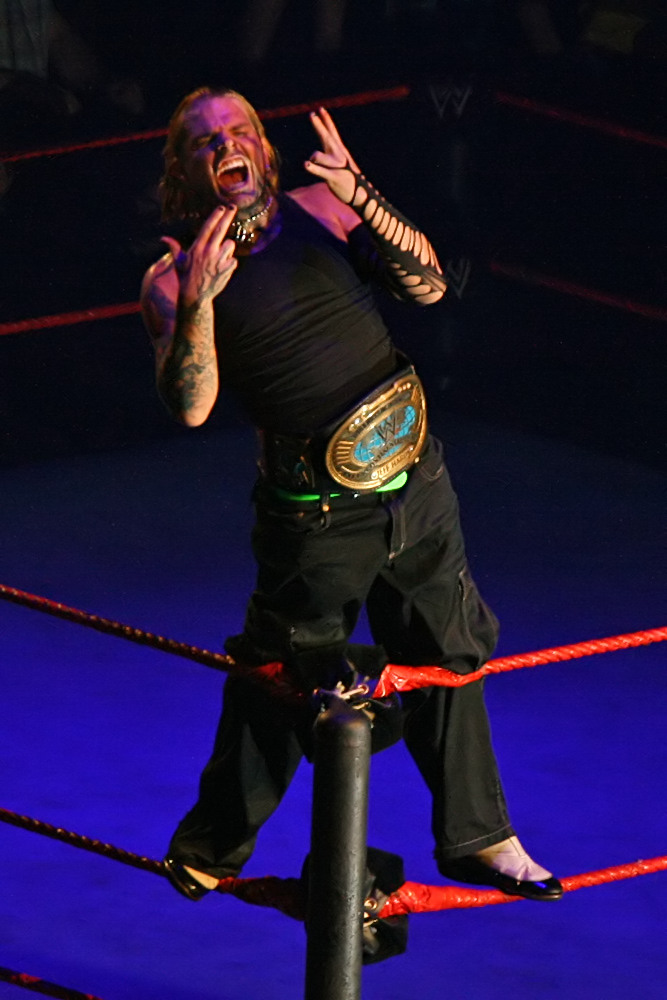
Jeff Hardy defeated Johnny Nitro to become Intercontinental Champion

On the edition of October 2, 2006 of Raw, John Cena was scheduled to defend the WWE Championship against Edge in a Steel Cage match, after Edge invoked his rematch clause for the title. Cena defeated Edge to retain the title, as he was able to perform an FU for the win, and thus ended the feud between the two. Edge, however, would begin a feud with DX, after Edge blamed DX for costing him the title match against Cena, due to interference from DX the previous week. The following week, Edge used an edition of The Cutting Edge to join forces with Randy Orton to form a team and began a feud against DX. Edge cited Randy Orton's lack of success after being kicked out of Evolution by Triple H and DX's "stale" antics "taking up TV time" as reasons to join forces. The duo dubbed themselves Rated-RKO. At Cyber Sunday, Edge and Orton became the first team to finally defeat DX since their reunion in June.

Kane and Umaga continued their feud, as both individuals interfered in one another's matches. On the edition of October 9, 2006 of Raw, Kane and Umaga were scheduled in a "Loser Leaves Raw match"; Umaga defeated Kane and sent him to the SmackDown! brand. Despite their separation into different brands, Umaga and Kane had one final match at Cyber Sunday. Umaga won again, after fans selected him to be Umaga's opponent instead of Chris Benoit and The Sandman. The angle between Johnny Nitro and Jeff Hardy continued, as the two were involved in another Intercontinental Championship match where Nitro retained the title. Nitro, however, lost the title to Hardy, on the October 2 edition of Raw.

The WWE Women's Championship was vacated on September 18, 2006, following Trish Stratus' win at Unforgiven. On the edition of September 25 of Raw, a Women's title tournament began, and the first match was won by Lita, after she defeated Candice Michelle. The second tournament match was a Lingerie match between Mickie James and Victoria, which James won. On the edition of October 9 of Raw, Melina defeated Torrie Wilson in a Lumberjill match to advance in the tournament match. The following week, Maria won a Fatal Four-Way Bra and Panties match against Victoria, Candice Michelle, and Torrie Wilson to advance to the semi-finals. On the edition of October 23 of Raw, James defeated Melina to advance in the semi-finals. The following week on Raw, Lita advanced in the tournament, after she defeated Maria. At Cyber Sunday, Lita and Mickie James advanced to the seventh match of the tournament. Lita won the vacant Women's title, after she pinned James with a Swinging snap DDT.

John Cena was placed in an inter-brand angle to determine the "Champion of Champions" – or who was the most dominant champion in WWE's three brands. Cena, King Booker (SmackDown!'s World Heavyweight Champion), and Big Show (ECW's World Champion) engaged in a feud leading to a triple threat match at Cyber Sunday in November; viewers chose which championship would be placed on the line. At the same time, Cena became involved in a storyline with non-wrestler Kevin Federline when he began appearing on Raw with Johnny Nitro and Melina. After getting into a worked physical altercation with Federline on Raw, Federline helped King Booker retain his title at Cyber Sunday in the triple threat match by hitting Cena with the World Heavyweight Title belt.

The 2006 Unforgiven would be the final brand-exclusive Unforgiven, as following WrestleMania 23 the following year, brand-exclusive pay-per-views were discontinued. This would also be the only Unforgiven to be held outside the United States as Unforgiven was discontinued after the 2008 event.

== Results ==
| No. | Results | Stipulations | Times |
|---|---|---|---|
| 1^{D} | Super Crazy defeated Shelton Benjamin | Singles match | 7:00 |
| 2 | Johnny Nitro (c) (with Melina) defeated Jeff Hardy | Singles match for the WWE Intercontinental Championship | 17:36 |
| 3 | Kane vs. Umaga (with Armando Estrada) ended in a double countout | Singles match | 7:03 |
| 4 | The Spirit Squad (Kenny and Mikey) (c) (with Johnny, Mitch and Nicky) defeated The Highlanders (Robbie McAllister and Rory McAllister) | Tag team match for the World Tag Team Championship | 8:59 |
| 5 | D-Generation X (Shawn Michaels and Triple H) defeated Big Show, Mr. McMahon, and Shane McMahon | Handicap Tag Team Hell in a Cell match | 25:05 |
| 6 | Trish Stratus defeated Lita (c) by submission | Singles match for the WWE Women's Championship; This was Trish Stratus' last match of her WWE full-time career | 11:35 |
| 7 | Randy Orton defeated Carlito | Singles match | 8:41 |
| 8 | John Cena defeated Edge (c) | Tables, Ladders, and Chairs match for the WWE Championship; Had Cena lost, he would leave Raw for SmackDown!. | 25:28 |
(c) / – the champion(s) heading into the match; D / – this was a dark match

== See also ==
- Professional wrestling in Canada
