= Kannodu Kanbathellam =

- Title card
- Directed by: Prabhu Solomon
- Screenplay by: Prabhu Solomon
- Dialogue by: M. Ravi
- Story by: M. Ravi
- Produced by: K. Prabhakar
- Starring: Arjun; Sonali Bendre
- Cinematography: G. Ramesh
- Edited by: Suresh Urs
- Music by: Deva
- Production company: Anbalaya Films
- Release date: 13 August 1999
- Running time: 143 minutes
- Country: India
- Language: Tamil

Kannodu Kanbathellam (pronounced [kaɳɳːoːɖu kaːɳbaðellːaːm] transl. All that is seen by the eyes) is a 1999 Indian Tamil-language romantic thriller film written and directed by Prabhu Solomon in his directorial debut. The film stars Arjun and Sonali Bendre, while Suchindra, Ruchita Prasad, Manivannan, Crazy Mohan, Anu Mohan, Kovai Sarala and Nizhalgal Ravi portray supporting roles. Music was composed by Deva. The film was released on 13 August 1999. The film's name is based on a song from the Tamil film Jeans (1998).

== Plot ==
Seetharam is a well-respected businessman who lives with his PA Muthuswamy in Chennai. Although short-tempered and tense, Seetharam is good at heart and helps people in need. He soon meets and falls in love with Kalyani. After a couple of meetings she sees his good nature and falls in love with him.

But, Seetharam faces problems in the form of another loving couple, Akash and Akhila due to an argument between Akhila and Akash and Akhila acts as Seetharam's fiancé so that she can get rid of Akash just before he proposes to Kalyani. Kalyani, being innocent and gullible, believes her words and goes away from Seetharam. An enraged and betrayed Seetharam therefore seeks revenge against Akash and Akhila by trying to separate them. But, he fails in all of his attempts. He also attempts to stop the love marriage between Akash and Akhila, which is arranged by Madana Gopal, Akash's father.

Akash and Akhila meet Seetharam and apologises to him, but Seetharam adamantly refuses to forgive them and sends goons to kill them. Seetharam, now a changed man, saves Akash and Akhila from the goons, who had never seen Seetharam in person and is not aware that he was the one who hired them. Seetharam apologises to Akash & Akhila, he tells the couple the incident that made him change his mind. Seetharam met Kalyani at a shopping mall and learns that she is married to a blind man, Rajasheker. She tells him that, after they broke up, she was struggling with crippling depression and Rajasheker was the beacon of light that saved her from this darkness, Akash & Akhila met her & explained what actually happened on that day, Kalyani realised this is what made her misunderstand Seetahram. She says that even though her husband is blind, she is content with her life now. Kalyani's husband tells Seetharam that God gave him a wonderful wife, in place of hos lost eyes. An emotionally distraught Seetharam wishes them "Best of Luck", and they invite Seetharam to their home. Akash & Akhila asks Seetharam whether they could find him a marriage alliance. Seetharam agrees to them, but he reveals them that it was just a prank as he cannot forget Kalyani & leaves them.

Alternate climax

After sending goons to kill both Akash and Akhila, Seetharam has a change of heart and decides to save them from the goons. After a prolonged fight with the goons, who are unaware that Seetharam was the one who hired them, Seetharam manages to save Akash and Akhila. He tells the couple the incident that made him change his mind. In a surprising turn of events, he met Kalyani at the airport with her blind brother. She told him that Akash and Akhila met her and apologised for their behaviour and revealed the truth behind the incident with Seetharam. Kalyani's brother requests Seetharam to accept his sister to which Seetharam happily accepts. The film ends with Seetharam and Kalyani united.

== Cast ==
- Arjun as Seetharam
- Sonali Bendre as Kalyani
- Suchindra Bali as Akash
- Ruchita Prasad as Akhila
- Manivannan as Madana Gopal, Akash's father
- Chinni Jayanth as Akash's friend
- Crazy Mohan as Kalaiselvam, Akhila's father
- Anu Mohan as Muthuswamy, Seetharam's PA
- Kovai Sarala as Akhila's mother
- Nizhalgal Ravi as Thangarajan
- Thalaivasal Vijay as DCP Bharathi, a police officer
- Pandu as Akhila's boss
- Halwa Vasu as a man who asks Madana Gopal to check whether his currency note is original
- Ravi Shanth as Akash's friend
- Balaji as Akash's friend
- Prabhu Solomon as a goon
- Raju Sundaram in a special appearance in the song "Ai Yamma"

== Production ==
Anbalaya Films offered debutant Prabhu Solomon an opportunity to direct a film for their production house, after he had helped them complete the post-production works for Murai Mappillai (1995) when director Sundar C walked out. Prabhu Solomon chose to feature Raghuvaran and Bhanupriya in the leading roles, though Anbalaya Films were reluctant to cast a character artiste in the lead role. Prabhu revealed he met Arjun in Tenkasi during the making of Mudhalvan (1999), at the insistence of his producer and actively tried to make a poor impression. Arjun, nonetheless, was keen and worked on the film. Debutant Suchindra Bali (son of actress Vyjayanthimala) and Ruchita Prasad, who previously appeared in Kannada films were chosen to portray a young couple in love.

== Soundtrack ==
Soundtrack was composed by Deva.

Song	Singers	Lyrics	Length
"Ae Kuruvi"	Mano	Thamarai	05:29
"Ai Yamma"	Naveen, Swarnalatha	Vaali	04:57
"Iruvathu Vayathu" 1	S. Janaki, Hariharan	Kalaikumar	05:49
"Iruvathu Vayathu" 2	S. Janaki	Kalaikumar	05:49
"Iruvathu Vayathu" 3	Hariharan	Kalaikumar	05:44
"Mona Mona"	S. P. Balasubrahmanyam, Sujatha	Mayil	05:20
"Tajmahal Ondru"	Hariharan	Mayil	05:45

== Release and reception ==
K. Vijiyan of New Straits Times felt that the film should have been done by "someone more experienced". K. P. S. of Kalki wrote that the director who moved the story by giving different touch to love messed up the climax but praised Arjun's acting and Deva's music. D. S. Ramanujam of The Hindu wrote, "`Action King' Arjun pits his experience in full measure to delineate a two-faced personality". He added, "Debutant director Prabhu deals with the new theme of M. Ravi, who has also written the dialogue with panache", and Pravin Bali "makes a fairly impressive debut, while another newcomer Ruchita, proves to be promising", also appreciating the cinematography. Kala Krishnan Ramesh of Deccan Herald called it "A straightforward old fashioned love story without gimmicks and flourishes".

Several days after the film's release, owing to public demand, the climax was changed to show a more optimistic ending where Arjun's character reunites with Sonali Bendre's character.
