= The Great Khali =

Indian-American professional wrestler (born 1972)

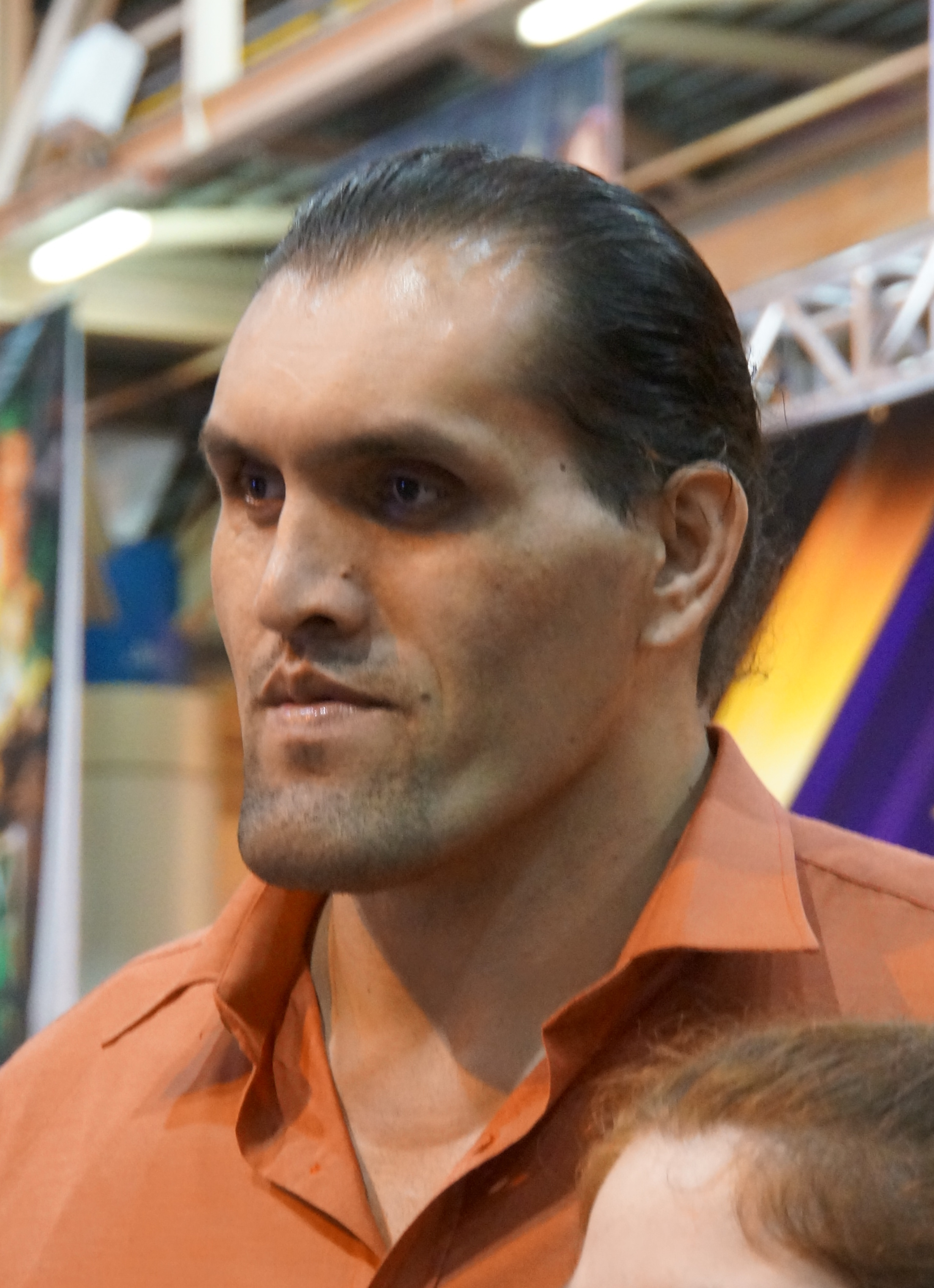
- Rana in 2014

Personal information
- Citizenship: India (until 2014); United States (from 2014)
- Born: Dalip Singh Rana; 27 August 1972 (age 54) Dhiraina, Himachal Pradesh, India
- Spouse: Harminder Kaur (m. 2002)
- Children: 2

Professional wrestling career
- Ring names: Dalip Singh; Giant Singh; The Great Khali
- Billed height: 2.15 m (7 ft 1 in)
- Billed weight: 157.5 kg (347 lb)
- Billed from: Punjab, India
- Trained by: All Pro Wrestling
- Debut: 7 October 2000
- Retired: 27 April 2018
- Political party: Bharatiya Janata Party (2022–present)

Dalip Singh Rana (born 27 August 1972), better known by his ring name The Great Khali, is an Indian-born American former professional wrestler, promoter, and actor. He is best known for his tenure with WWE, where he became the first Indian-born world champion. Standing over 7 feet tall due to acromegaly, Khali gained attention for his imposing stature and was prominently featured in WWE storylines throughout the mid-2000s to early 2010s.

Rana began his professional wrestling career in 2000, competing in the United States for All Pro Wrestling (APW), followed by appearances in World Championship Wrestling (WCW), New Japan Pro-Wrestling (NJPW), and other international promotions. He signed with WWE in 2006, where he was involved in high-profile feuds with The Undertaker, John Cena, Batista, and Triple H, and participated in major events such as WrestleMania and SummerSlam. Outside the ring, Khali appeared in films including The Longest Yard (2005) and Get Smart (2008), and finished as runner-up on the reality television show Bigg Boss 4 in 2011.

In 2015, Rana founded Continental Wrestling Entertainment (CWE) based in Jalandhar, Punjab. Khali was inducted into the WWE Hall of Fame in 2021 and continues to make occasional appearances for the company.

== Early life ==
Rana was born into a Hindu Rajput family to parents Jwala Ram and Tandi Devi in the village of Dhiraina, located in the Sirmaur district of Himachal Pradesh. He was one of seven siblings in a financially struggling household and worked various odd jobs in his youth to support his family.

Rana has acromegaly, a hormonal disorder that results in abnormal growth, including gigantism and pronounced facial features such as jaw protrusion. While working as a security guard in Shimla, he was noticed by a police officer from the neighbouring state of Punjab. The officer, known for mentoring athletes within the Punjab Police, facilitated Rana's recruitment into the Punjab Police force in 1993, where he began training in sports and physical fitness at a more serious level.

== Professional wrestling career ==
=== Early career (2000–2006) ===
Competing under the ring name Giant Singh, Rana began his professional wrestling career with All Pro Wrestling (APW), based in the San Francisco Bay Area. He made his debut in October 2000.

APW trainee Brian Ong died on 28 May 2001 after sustaining a serious injury a few days prior in a training session following a botched flapjack maneuver from Singh. Although Singh was not held personally liable, Ong's family filed a lawsuit against APW in which he was found to be a contributing factor. A jury found the promotion liable for recklessness and awarded the Ong family $1.3 million in damages.

During this period, Rana also briefly signed a contract with World Championship Wrestling (WCW), where he spent time in training and development. However, his tenure was cut short when WCW was acquired by its rival, the World Wrestling Federation (WWF), in March 2001.

Later in 2001, Rana received an offer to join New Japan Pro-Wrestling (NJPW), where he once again competed under the ring name Giant Singh. Teaming with fellow giant wrestler Giant Silva, the duo formed what was billed as the tallest tag team in professional wrestling history, with an average height of 7 feet 1 inch and a combined weight of 805 pounds. They debuted at the Tokyo Dome in October 2001, introduced as Club 7 by Masahiro Chono, and won a two-on-four handicap match. Singh suffered his first recorded loss at Wrestling World 2002 in January during a tag team match. His most notable loss during this period came in August at the Nippon Budokan, where, after a falling out with Silva, he was defeated by his former tag team partner in a singles match.

From 2002 to 2006, Singh continued to wrestle internationally, competing in Mexico for Consejo Mundial de Lucha Libre (CMLL) and in Japan for All Japan Pro Wrestling (AJPW).

=== World Wrestling Entertainment/WWE (2006-2015) ===
==== Dominance (2006–2008) ====
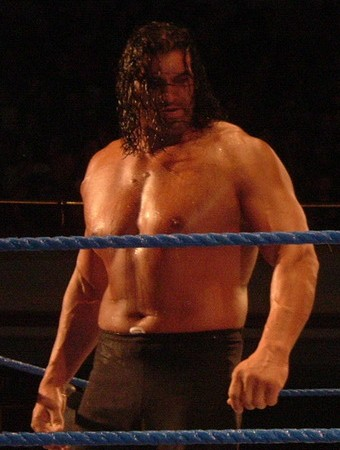
The Great Khali in 2006

On 2 January 2006, Rana became the first Indian professional wrestler to be signed to a contract by World Wrestling Entertainment (WWE). He was assigned to their developmental territory, Deep South Wrestling, where he competed under his real name.

The Great Khali made his television debut accompanied by Daivari on 7 April episode of SmackDown!, where he attacked The Undertaker, beginning a storyline rivalry. Two weeks later, Khali competed in his first televised match, decisively defeating Funaki. In May, Khali continued to be presented as a dominant force, defeating World Heavyweight Champion Rey Mysterio in a non-title bout. On 21 May at Judgment Day, Khali gained a notable victory over The Undertaker. Khali was scheduled to face The Undertaker in a Punjabi Prison match at The Great American Bash on 23 July but was replaced by Big Show after being deemed medically unable to compete. Despite Khali's interference during the match, The Undertaker secured the win. Khali experienced his first televised loss on 18 August episode of SmackDown! in a Last Man Standing match against The Undertaker.

Khali moved to the Raw brand on the 8 January 2007 episode of Raw. Khali began a short feud with Kane on 23 February episode of SmackDown!, culminating in a victory at WrestleMania 23 on 1 April. On 30 April episode of Raw, Khali entered a storyline involving John Cena's WWE Championship, earning a title match by defeating Shawn Michaels on 7 May episode of Raw. Khali was defeated by Cena at Judgment Day on 20 May. The next night on Raw, Ranjin Singh was introduced as Khali's new manager and translator. Their rivalry continued at One Night Stand on 3 June, where Khali once again lost to Cena in a Falls Count Anywhere match.

On 11 June episode of Raw, Khali was drafted to the SmackDown! brand as part of the 2007 WWE Draft. Khali won the vacant World Heavyweight Championship by emerging victorious in a 20-man battle royal on 20 July episode of SmackDown!. He went on to successfully defend the title against Batista and Kane in a triple threat match at The Great American Bash on 22 July, and again against Batista at SummerSlam on 26 August, retaining the championship despite losing the match by disqualification. Khali's reign ended at Unforgiven on 16 September, where he lost the title to Batista in a triple threat match also involving Rey Mysterio. The following month, he challenged Batista for the championship in a Punjabi Prison match at No Mercy on 7 October, but was unsuccessful.

In late 2007 and early 2008, Khali was involved in a storyline with Finlay, frequently attempting to intimidate or attack Hornswoggle, only to be thwarted by Finlay. He participated in the Elimination Chamber match at No Way Out on 17 February but failed to earn a World Heavyweight Championship opportunity at WrestleMania XXIV. Instead, at WrestleMania on 30 March, he competed in a 24-man battle royal for a chance at the ECW Championship but was unsuccessful. Khali then entered a brief feud with Big Show, culminating in a match at Backlash on 27 April, where Big Show secured the win.

In July, Khali began a rivalry with Triple H over the WWE Championship. On 25 July episode of SmackDown!, he won a battle royal to become the number one contender for the title at SummerSlam. At SummerSlam on 17 August, Khali was defeated by Triple H.

==== Punjabi Playboy (2008–2014) ====
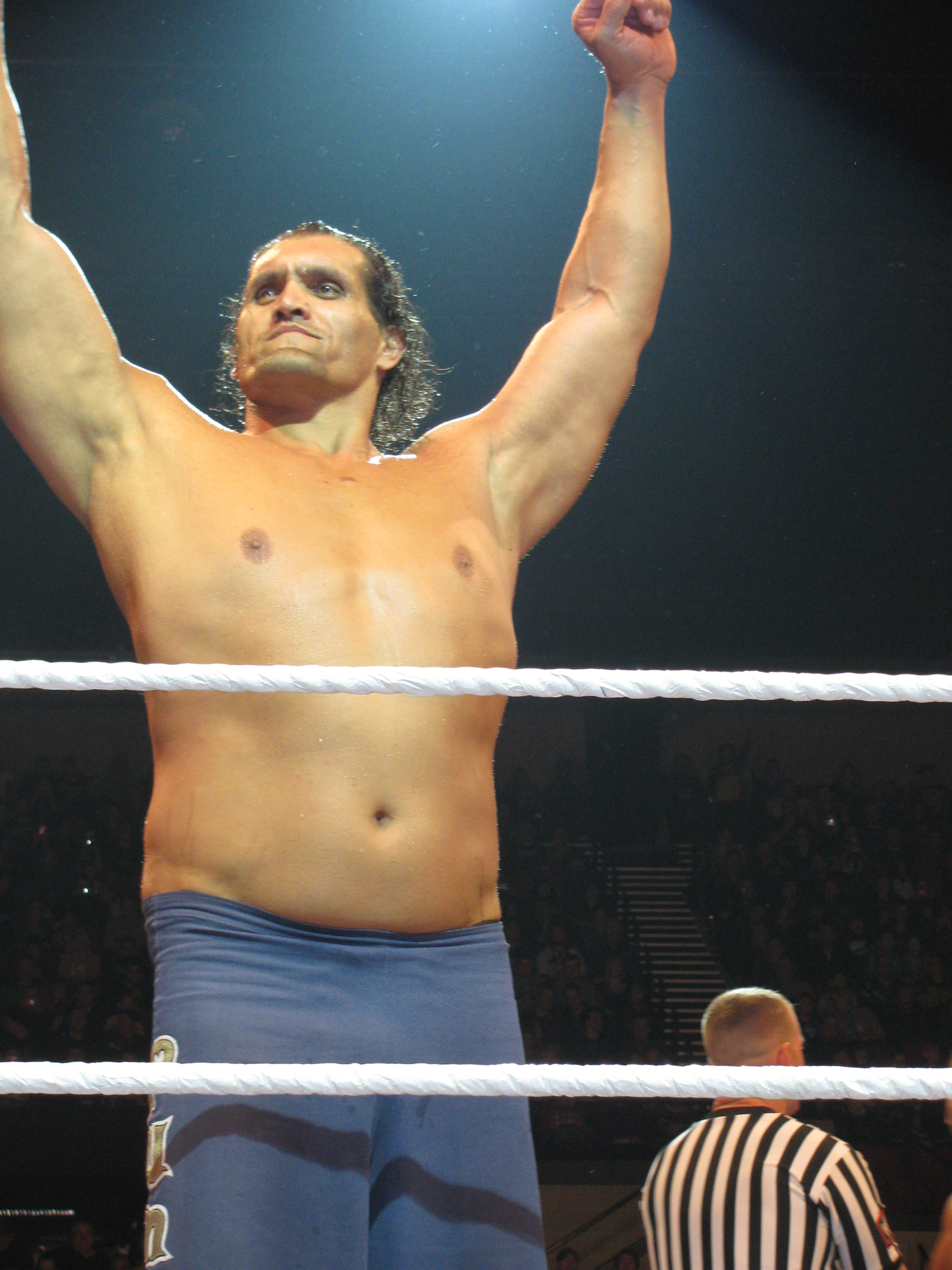
Khali at a WWE live event in 2013

In October, Khali became involved in a brief comedic storyline with stunt performer Johnny Knoxville. During an interview featured on Knoxville's website, Khali took offence to some of his remarks and issued a threat of retaliation. He later invited Knoxville to appear on an episode of Raw, only to attack him during the segment. Following this, Khali adopted a more lighthearted on-screen persona and gradually became a fan favourite. Alongside his manager Ranjin Singh, he began hosting the weekly "Khali Kiss Cam" segment, during which Singh would invite seemingly random women from the audience to enter the ring and kiss Khali.

Khali began a feud with Dolph Ziggler in mid-2009, which led to a match at The Bash on 28 June. He was defeated following interference from Kane, sparking a subsequent rivalry between the two. This culminated in matches against Kane at SummerSlam on 23 August and Breaking Point on 13 September, both of which Khali lost. Shortly afterward, he was written off television to undergo knee surgery. While recovering, Khali made a surprise appearance alongside on 2 November episode of Raw, joining Sharon and Ozzy Osbourne as a guest judge for the "Raw's Got Talent" segment. He returned to in-ring competition in December. On 19 April 2010 episode of Raw, Khali appeared as "Khaluber" (parody of MacGruber) teaming with guest host Will Forte (as MacGruber) in a handicap match against Vladimir Kozlov, which they won.

At WrestleMania XXVII on 3 April 2011, Khali won a pre-show battle royal. He was later involved in a storyline with Jinder Mahal, which led to the two forming an on-screen alliance. The partnership lasted until September, when they failed to capture the WWE Tag Team Championship, leading to the end of their alliance. The following year, Khali competed in the World Heavyweight Championship Elimination Chamber match at the namesake event in February but was unsuccessful. At WrestleMania XXVIII, he took part in a 12-man tag team match, which his team lost. He competed in the inaugural André the Giant Memorial Battle Royal at WrestleMania XXX on 6 April 2014, but did not win. Khali's contract with WWE expired on 13 November 2014, after which he departed the company.

=== Later career (2015–present) ===
In February 2015, Khali founded Continental Wrestling Entertainment (CWE), a professional wrestling promotion and training academy based in Jalandhar, Punjab. The promotion held its first event on 12 December 2015. Among its trainees, Dilsher Shanky and Kavita Devi later signed with WWE, marking CWE as a significant stepping stone for Indian talent.

Since 2017, Khali has made occasional appearances for WWE. He returned at Battleground on 23 July 2017, assisting WWE Champion Jinder Mahal in defeating Randy Orton during a Punjabi Prison match. In April 2018, he took part in the Greatest Royal Rumble match in Jeddah, Saudi Arabia, but was eliminated. In recognition of his contributions to the company, he was inducted into the WWE Hall of Fame in 2021. Khali made another special appearance at WWE Superstar Spectacle in 2023.

== Television and film ==
From October 2010 to January 2011, Khali appeared as a contestant on the fourth season of the Indian reality television show Bigg Boss, where he finished as the first runner-up. Due to his size, the show made special accommodations for him, including a custom-built bed. In 2011, he made guest appearances on international television, including a brief cameo in episode 18 of NBC's Outsourced, and as Atog, a rock-smashing giant, in the Disney Channel series Pair of Kings.

Khali has also made appearances on various Indian comedy and talk shows, including Aap Ki Adalat, Comedy Nights with Kapil, Comedy Nights Bachao, and The Kapil Sharma Show.

In addition to television, Khali has acted in several films, both in Hollywood and Indian cinema. He made his film debut in 2005 as Turley in The Longest Yard, followed by roles in Get Smart (2008), MacGruber (2010), and the Indian films Kushti (2010), Ramaa: The Saviour (2010), and HOUBA! On the Trail of the Marsupilami (2012). In 2023, he appeared in the Bangladeshi action thriller MR-9: Do or Die.

== Personal life ==
Rana married Harminder Kaur in 2002. The couple has two children: a daughter, born in February 2014, and a son, born in November 2023.

He has been described as deeply spiritual and a follower of Indian spiritual leader Ashutosh Maharaj. Known for his disciplined lifestyle, Rana meditates daily and abstains from alcohol and tobacco. He originally suggested the ring name "Khali" as a reference to the Hindu goddess Kali, associated with eternal energy, but later stated that WWE gave him the full ring name "The Great Khali".

Rana has followed a rigorous training regimen, including weightlifting twice a day. In the early stages of his career, he maintained a mostly vegetarian diet, later adding chicken and other meats to meet his nutritional requirements. On 26 July 2012, he underwent surgery to remove a benign tumour from his pituitary gland, a condition linked to his diagnosis of acromegaly.

He became a naturalised citizen of the United States on 20 February 2014, and also holds an Overseas Citizenship of India card. On 10 February 2022, Rana joined the Bharatiya Janata Party (BJP).

== Championships and accomplishments ==
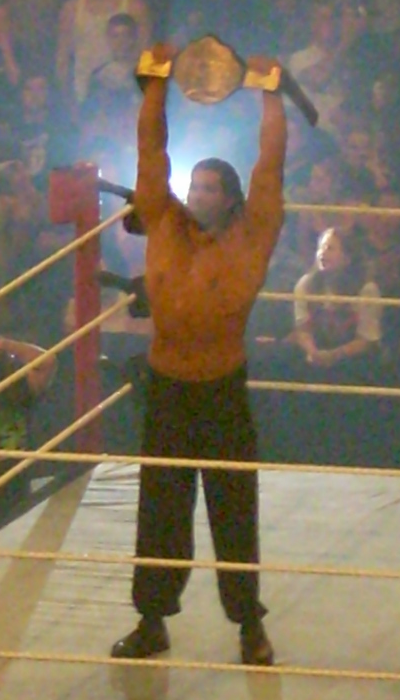
Khali is a former World Heavyweight Champion, and the first Indian wrestler to win a World Title in WWE.

- Continental Wrestling Entertainment
  - CWE Heavyweight Championship (2 times)
- New Japan Pro-Wrestling
  - Teisen Hall Six-Man Tournament (2002) – with Masahiro Chono and Giant Silva
- Pro Wrestling Illustrated
  - Ranked No. 83 of the top 500 singles wrestlers in the PWI 500 in 2008
- Wrestling Observer Newsletter
  - Most Overrated (2007)
  - Worst Gimmick (2008)
- World Wrestling Entertainment / WWE
  - World Heavyweight Championship (1 time)
  - WWE Hall of Fame (Class of 2021)
  - Slammy Award (1 time)
    - "Damn!" Moment of the Year (2008) Khali hosts the Kiss Cam on SmackDown, 7 November

== Bibliography ==
- Bansal, Vinit K.; Khali, The Great (2017). The Man who Became Khali. New Delhi, India: Penguin Books. ISBN 978-0-14-342623-3.

== See also ==
- Sport in India – Overview of sports in India
- Professional wrestling in India – Overview of professional wrestling in India
- WWE in India
- Wrestling in India
- Martial arts in India – Overview of Indian martial arts
- List of articles about professional wrestling of India
- List of Indian professional wrestlers
- The Great Gama
