= Ninaithaley =

2007 film by Viswas Sundar

- Directed by: Viswas Sundar
- Written by: Bharathan (dialogues)
- Story by: Sekhar Kammula
- Produced by: Viswas Sundar
- Starring: Suchindra; Nargis Bagheri; Santhoshi
- Cinematography: Thavasi Raj; Madhi
- Music by: Vijay Antony
- Production company: Viswas Films
- Release date: 11 May 2007
- Country: India
- Language: Tamil

Ninaithaley (transl. Memories) is a 2007 Indian Tamil-language romance film starring Suchindra and Nargis Bagheri. It is a remake of the 2004 Telugu film Anand. It is Suchindra's first Tamil film as the hero. The film is directed by Viswas Sundar who is also the producer for the films Adhu and Chanakya.

== Plot ==
The story opens with Rupa's parents being killed in a car accident by a drunken driver. She is orphaned, but friends and neighbours support her, and she gets a good job. She falls in love with Rahul, her colleague, and she accepts to marry him. On the other side, there is Anand, who has returned from the United States and is forced to attend a family friend's wedding. On the wedding day, he meets the bride Rupa, and it is love at first sight for him, but soon, the wedding is called off because of some arguments between Rupa and her future mother-in-law. Anand is elated because the marriage is cancelled. He talks to Rupa and admires her for her boldness. He completely falls in love with her. To win her love, he, among other things, shifts to a house nearer to hers, develops a friendship with her and she starts to love him. But she discovers that Anand's father murdered her parents. The rest of the story is about whether the lovers will be united.

== Cast ==
- Suchindra as Anand
- Nargis as Rupa
- Santhoshi as Rupa's friend
- Krishna as Narayanan
- Sarfraaz as Rahul
- Sriranjani as Anand's mother
- Velu Prabhakaran as Anand's father
- Pei Krishnan as Henchman (uncredited)

== Production ==
The movie was earlier entitled Sweet. However, Sundar changed the title because of the announcement of the Tamil Nadu Government that Tamil films with Tamil names will be exempted from entertainment tax. The shooting of the song "Naanthaanaa Naanthaanaa" took place in Golkonda, capital and fortress city of the Qutb Shahi kingdom, near Hyderabad. Another important scene was shot in Kushaldass Garden in Chennai.

== Soundtrack ==
Soundtrack was composed by Vijay Antony.

Song	Singers	Lyrics
"Anandham Anandham"	Roopa, Sangeetha Rajeshwaran, Vinaya	
"Dingi Dingi"	Pavithra, Vinaya	Annamalai
"En Peyar Ennakaye"	Vinaya	Annamalai
"Ilaiyaraaja A. R. Rahman"	Naresh Iyer, Vinaya	Kabilan
"Kaakkai Siraginiley"	Roopa, Sangeetha Rajeshwaran, Vinaya	Bharathiyar
"Konji Konji"	Vinaya	P. Vijay
"Naanthana Naanthana"	Rahul Nambiar, Sadhana Sargam	Vijay Sagar
"Thanneer Pookkale"	Sangeetha Rajeshwaran	Palani Bharathi

== Critical reception ==
Cinesouth appreciated almost every aspect of the film, including the direction, writing, cinematography and cast performances. Chennai Vision wrote "Anand, the original version of Ninaithale in Telugu came with the caption 'Oka manchi coffee lanti cinema' (a film as fresh as a nice coffee). In Tamil too, producer turned director Viswas Sundar has followed it faithfully and retained the freshness, not just in the screenplay or narration, but in everything including refreshing takes and sensitive crafting". Hema Vijay of Rediff.com wrote "Thought the film suffers from a weak story line, the setting and the characters are contemporary".

Malini Mannath of Chennai Online wrote, "A soft, sweet love-story, sans violence, overt sex or double entendres, 'Ninaithaley...' is a clean, wholesome, family entertainer". Lajjavathi of Kalki praised the acting of lead pair and other cast, cinematography, music, dialogues and direction. S. R. Ashok Kumar of The Hindu wrote, "Madhi's camera work is noteworthy while Lenin's editing is a plus point. Bharathan's dialogue is crisp and to the point. It is a love story with a difference".
