= Suchindra Bali =

Indian actor

- Other name: Suchin
- Parent: Vyjayanthimala (mother)

Suchindra Bali (born 1976) is an Indian actor who has appeared in Tamil language films.

== Career ==
Suchindra is the son of former 1950s and 1960s actress Vyjayanthimala and Chamanlal Bali. He was in Delhi for college and then went to Columbia University in the United States to do his master's degree. He's a law graduate from Delhi. After completing his studies, he started modelling.

Several acting sessions and dance classes later, he entered into Tamil cinema industry. Acting was the last thing on Suchin's mind, one day his photograph appeared in a Tamil daily and was seen by a producer who came to sign him for a movie. His first movie as a guest role was Kannodu Kanbathellam, where he shared frames with Arjun and his second film was Mugavaree with Ajith Kumar. He also worked on the unreleased film Varsha (2001) directed by Vijay Kumar. He also worked with Nana Patekar, his debut Bollywood movie was Aanch, directed by Rajesh Singh.

His next Tamil venture was Ninaithaley, directed by Viswas Sundar. It was his first Tamil movie as a solo hero.

== Filmography ==
Year	Film	Role	Language	Notes
1999	Kannodu Kanbathellam	Akash	Tamil	Guest appearance
2000	Mugavaree	Dhurai	Tamil	Cameo appearance
2003	Aanch	Diwakar	Hindi	
2007	Ninaithaley	Anand	Tamil	
