= Rosey (wrestler) =

Samoan-American professional wrestler (1970–2017)

Matt Anoa’i
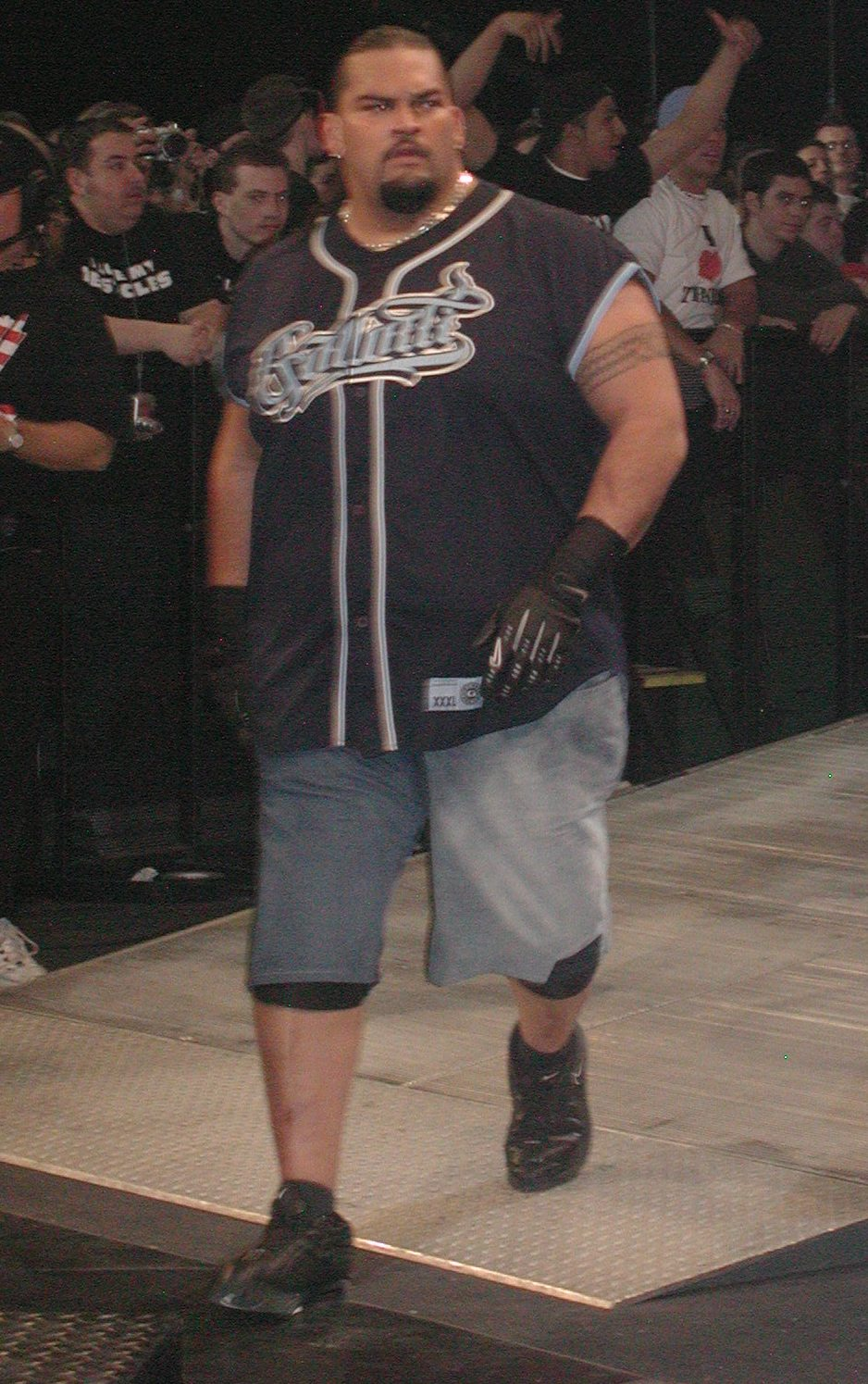
- Anoa’i in 2003

Personal information
- Born: Matthew Tapunu'u Anoaʻi; April 7, 1970 San Francisco, California, U.S.
- Died: April 17, 2017 (aged 47) Pensacola, Florida, U.S.
- Spouse: Mandy Vandeberg (m. 2004; div. 2012)
- Children: 3
- Family: Anoaʻi

Professional wrestling career
- Ring name(s): Armageddon II; Big Daddy Row Row; Captain Chronic; Kimo; Kuhio; Mack Daddy Kane; Matt Anoaʻi; Matty Samu; Matty Smalls; Rosey; RO-Z
- Billed height: 6 ft 7 in (201 cm)
- Billed weight: 420 lb (191 kg)
- Billed from: Pensacola, Florida, U.S.
- Trained by: Afa Anoaʻi
- Debut: 1995
- Retired: 2017

Matthew Tapunu'u Anoaʻi (April 7, 1970 – April 17, 2017) was an American professional wrestler. He was best known for his tenure in World Wrestling Entertainment (WWE), under the ring names Kimo and Rosey.

Anoa'i was a member of the Anoaʻi family, a renowned Samoan wrestling family. Anoa'i, along with his late cousins Eddie Fatu and Matt Fatu, as well as the elder brother of Roman Reigns, was trained at the Wild Samoan Training Facility headed by his uncle, Afa Anoaʻi. Following his training, he competed in Afa's World Xtreme Wrestling (WXW) promotion. He began competing in tag team competition with Samu as the Samoan Gangsta Party. The team had a brief stint in Extreme Championship Wrestling (ECW). Throughout the mid-1990s, Anoaʻi competed in various independent promotions and international promotions including World Wrestling Council and Frontier Martial-Arts Wrestling, winning various tag team championships. In 2001, Anoaʻi signed with the WWE and was assigned to Heartland Wrestling Association (HWA) in Cincinnati, Ohio. While situated at HWA, he was placed in tag team competition, alongside Fatu, and the duo won the HWA Tag Team Championship.

After signing with WWE in 2002, Anoaʻi and Fatu were called up to the Raw roster. Known as 3-Minute Warning, they were utilized as enforcers for then-General Manager Eric Bischoff. Following the release of Fatu in 2003, Anoaʻi was "discovered" by The Hurricane and from there on they competed together as a team, known as The Hurricane and Rosey. After two years of teaming, they won the World Tag Team Championship, but disbanded shortly after losing the championship. Anoaʻi then did not re-sign his WWE contract in March 2006.

Following his stint with WWE, Anoaʻi took time off to spend with his young children coaching his oldest son’s teams. Anoa'i then continued his wrestling career, appearing at several independent promotions, including All Japan Pro Wrestling, Great Championship Wrestling, BAW Championship Wrestling, Appalachian Wrestling Federation, and Ohio Valley Wrestling. Aside from professional wrestling, Anoaʻi was a featured contestant on the reality television series Fat March.

== Early life ==
Anoaʻi was part of the Anoaʻi family. He was the son of former Samoan professional wrestler Sika Anoa‘i, who competed as one half of the Wild Samoans, and Patricia Hooker. His younger brother, Joe Anoaʻi, was the starting defensive tackle for the Georgia Tech Yellow Jackets football team and is also a professional wrestler who works for the WWE under the name Roman Reigns. Anoaʻi inducted the Wild Samoans (his father Sika and his uncle Afa) into the WWE Hall of Fame in 2007. Other cousins include The Usos, Solo Sikoa, Rikishi, Tama, Yokozuna, Akane, and Umaga.

Growing up, Anoaʻi played football alongside Emmitt Smith at Escambia High School in Pensacola, Florida. He hoped to play in the National Football League and played college football for Hawaii. He worked at various nightclubs in New Orleans before deciding to train as a professional wrestler.

== Professional wrestling career ==
=== Early career (1995–2001) ===
Anoaʻi trained with his cousin Eddie Fatu at the Wild Samoan professional wrestling school operated by members of their family. When their training was completed, they debuted in their uncle Afa's World Xtreme Wrestling (WXW) promotion. One of his first matches was for the World Wrestling Council (WWC) promotion in Puerto Rico. Competing under the name "Kuhio", he had two matches for the promotion in November 1995. He first challenged Pulgarcito for the WWC Television Championship on November 24 and then took on future WWC Television Champion Jim Steele on November 25 but lost both. He later began teaming with Samu as the Samoan Gangsta Party, using the name Mack Daddy Kane. It was in the Samoan Gangsta Party where Anoa'i won his first title when he and Samu competed in International World Class Championship Wrestling where they won the vacant IWCCW Tag Team Championship in a tournament on December 26, 1995, and ultimately would be the last champions before the promotion shut down.

The Samoan Gangsta Party had a brief stint in Extreme Championship Wrestling in the summer and fall of 1996, feuding with various tag teams, including The Gangstas, as well as the Eliminators and the Bruise Brothers. They debuted at Hardcore Heaven on June 22, 1996, taking on Axl Rotten and Hack Meyers which went to a No Contest. They returned on July 12, going a no contest with Big Dick Dudley and Buh Buh Ray Dudley. The following night at Heat Wave, they lost to The Gangstas. On August 3 at The Doctor Is In, Anoa'i and Samu took part in a four way for the ECW World Tag Team Championship against The Eliminators, The Gangstas, and The Bruise Brothers which was won by The Gangstas. From August to October, The Samoan Gangsta Party continued to get shots at the Tag Team Championship but were never able to win them. On September 20, Anoa'i would take on The Sandman but came up short.

Anoa'i returned to WXW in 1997, where he held the WXW Tag Team Championship as one half of the Samoan Gangstas with his cousin L. A. Smooth on two occasions. They defeated the Love Connection to begin their first title reign on May 24, and the Mad Russian and the Russian Eliminator on September 17 to begin their second. He also returned to the WWC in Puerto Rico during 1997, winning the WWC World Tag Team Championship with Tahiti as The Islanders on June 22 defeating Le Ley and Ricky Santana. They held the titles for two months before losing them to The Youngbloods by forfeit on August 16. Anoa'i and Smooth then went to the National Wrestling League where they won the vacant NWL Tag Team Championship by defeated The Grungers on December 12, 1997. They held the belts for three months until they were vacant in March 1998

In March 1999, Anoa'i traveled to Japan to wrestle for Frontier Martial-Arts Wrestling (FMW). He originally teamed with Fatu as "Armageddon" with Fatu as Armageddon I and Anao'i as Armageddon II. He debuted on March 20, 1999, during FMW's Round Robin Tag League tour teaming with Fatu and Ricky Fuji in a losing effort to Hideki Hosaka, Hisakatsu Oya, and Super Leather. After scoring one-on-one wins over Hosaka and Fuji, Anoa'i took part in a round robin tournament for the FMW Brass Knuckles Tag Team Championship but only finished with 2 points. In the summer of 1999, Anoa'i teamed with Fatu and Super Leather in a round robin tournament for the WEW 6-Man Tag Team Championship but missed the semifinals after losing a decision match to Hayabusa, Masato Tanaka, and Tetsuhiro Kuroda. In May 2000, Anoa'i and Fatu would drop the Armageddon gimmick and began competing as "The Samoans" with Anoa'i changing his name to Matty Samu while Fatu became Eddie Fatu. On June 21, Anoa'i and Fatu defeated Hosaka and Yoshinori Sasaki to win the FMW Hardcore Tag Team Championship. The two would hold the titles for a month and made two successful title defenses before dropping the titles back to Hosaka and Sasaki on July 28.

=== World Wrestling Federation/Entertainment (2001–2006) ===
==== Island Boys (2001–2002) ====
Anoaʻi, along with Fatu, signed developmental contracts with World Wrestling Entertainment (WWE), and were assigned to Heartland Wrestling Association (HWA), adopting the tag team name The Island Boyz, and with Anoaʻi using the ring name Kimo. They won the HWA Tag Team Championship in November 2001, by defeating Evan Karagias and Shannon Moore. They also competed for Memphis Championship Wrestling (MCW), holding the MCW Southern Tag Team Championship on three occasions.

==== 3-Minute Warning (2002–2003) ====
Kimo (renamed Rosey) and Fatu (renamed Jamal) made their WWE debut on the July 22, 2002, episode of Raw as 3-Minute Warning, a pair of villainous savages. The name Rosey was inspired by Rosey Grier, an American football player. They were "hired" as Eric Bischoff's enforcers, attacking random wrestlers each week, after Bischoff either gave people three minutes to entertain him before they were attacked or decided that three minutes of a segment was enough before the team appeared to end it. They attacked numerous wrestlers at the orders of Bischoff, including D'Lo Brown and Shawn Stasiak. They also attacked non-wrestlers, including ring announcer Lilian Garcia and retired wrestlers Jimmy Snuka, Mae Young and The Fabulous Moolah. They also attacked two lesbians, which Anoaʻi later cited as his favorite 3-Minute Warning run-in.

In September, 3-Minute Warning began a feud with Billy and Chuck, interfering in their storyline commitment ceremony, and defeating them at the Unforgiven pay-per-view event. Rico, Billy and Chuck's former manager, also began to manage 3-Minute Warning during this time. They competed regularly in Raw's tag team division until June 2003, when Jamal was released from his WWE contract.

==== Teaming with The Hurricane (2003–2006) ====
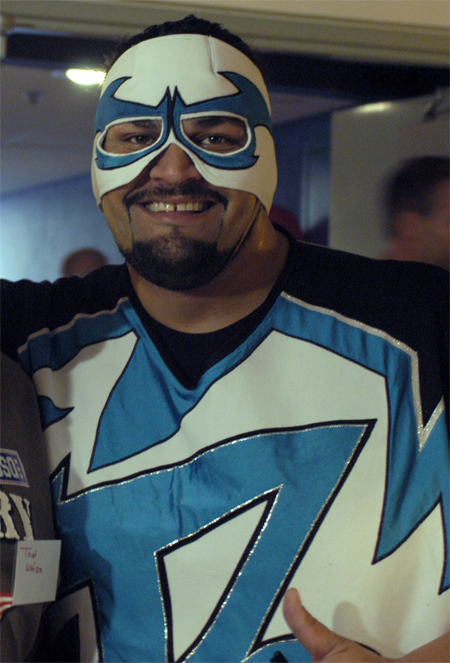
Rosey in 2005.

Later in 2003, The Hurricane "discovered" Rosey's potential as a superhero and christened him as "Rosey, the Super Hero in Training" (the S.H.I.T.). Rosey was involved in numerous sketches involving him training to be a superhero, including helping an old lady to cross the street and attempting to get changed into his superhero costume in a phonebox. Rosey and The Hurricane teamed regularly together during this time, wrestling against teams including Chris Jericho and Christian and Evolution. On the July 19, 2004, episode of Raw, Rosey appeared with a new costume, seemingly graduated to a full superhero, officially turning him into a fan favorite.

On May 1, 2005, at the Backlash pay-per-view, Rosey and Hurricane defeated La Résistance in the finals of a Tag Team Turmoil match to win the World Tag Team Championship. They were joined for a short while by WWE Diva Stacy Keibler, who they referred to as Super Stacy. Stacy, however, was then drafted to the SmackDown! brand. On September 5, 2005, Rosey and The Hurricane were defeated by Lance Cade and Trevor Murdoch, during their debut match on Raw. This match earned the pair a tag team title shot at Unforgiven. During the title match, Murdoch delivered an elevated DDT on The Hurricane to the outside. The DDT caused Hurricane to suffer a storyline "stinger" and allowed Cade and Murdoch to beat the injured Hurricane later in the match to win the World Tag Team Title from him and Rosey.

The loss of the title eventually brought the team to an end, as they began a losing streak caused by Hurricane's injuries. During the October 17, 2005, episode of Raw, Hurricane was assaulted by Kurt Angle at the request of WWE Chairman Vince McMahon. After the beating footage was shown, Hurricane ripped off his mask and struck Rosey (who had come to the ring to his aid). The following week, Hurricane did not show up for a World Tag Team Title match, leaving Rosey to face the champions Cade and Murdoch alone. During the match, The Hurricane (out of costume) appeared at the top of the entrance ramp, now going by the name Gregory Helms as he watched Rosey get double teamed and defeated. After the match, Helms announced that he was fed up of being funny for the crowd, and that he had been carrying Rosey as a tag team partner. On the November 7, 2005, episode, Helms defeated Rosey in their first encounter since teaming together.

Shortly after this turmoil, Jamal was rehired by WWE, and he and Rosey were scheduled to reunite 3-Minute Warning. The duo wrestled as a tag team during a dark match before the January 9, 2006, episode of Raw. However, on March 21, 2006, Rosey was released from his WWE contract, and the hinted return of 3-Minute Warning never made it to television.

=== All Japan Pro Wrestling (2006–2007) ===
Anoaʻi began competing for All Japan Pro Wrestling (AJPW) in 2006, using the name RO-Z. He made his debut on June 25, 2006, during the Crossover tour as a member of RO&D where he teamed with Taiyo Kea in a winning effort against Arashi and Satoshi Kojima with Anoa'i scoring the win over Arashi. Two months later, Anoa'i betrayed RO&D and defected to the Voodoo Murders. On September 17, Anoa'i teamed with Taru, Suwama, and "brother" Yasshi against Taka Michinoku, Taiyo Kea, D-Lo Brown, and Buchanan in a "losing team must disband" match where Anoa'i pinned Kea after Brown and Buchanan turned on Michinoku and Kea. In October, Anoa'i began pursuing Minoru Suzuki and the Triple Crown Heavyweight Championship. On October 29, Anoa'i challenged Suzuki for the Triple Crown Championship but was defeated. He teamed up with Suwama to wrestle in the 2006 World's Strongest Tag Determination League where they placed first with nine points and Anao'i even scored a win over Keiji Mutoh along the way. Due to placing first, they made it to the finals where they were defeated by Satoshi Kojima and Hiroyoshi Tenzan. He continued to compete for AJPW throughout 2007, including in the 2007 January 4 Dome Show at the Tokyo Dome, where he teamed with Taru, Suwama, and Giant Bernard to defeat Riki Choshu, Manabu Nakanishi, Takashi Iizuka, and Naofumi Yamamoto. On February 17 at Pro Wrestling Love in Ryogoku Vol. 2, Anoa'i teamed with Suwama to take on Taiyo Kea and Toshiaki Kawada for the vacant World Tag Team Championship but came up short. Anoaʻi participated in the AJPW 2007 Champion Carnival tournament as a member of Block B, but he finished with two points in the series, coming last in Block B though he did score a win over Kawada. His last match was on March 30 teaming with TARU and Suwama in a winning effort over Akira Raijin, Kiyonari Sanada, and T28.

=== Later career (2006–2017) ===
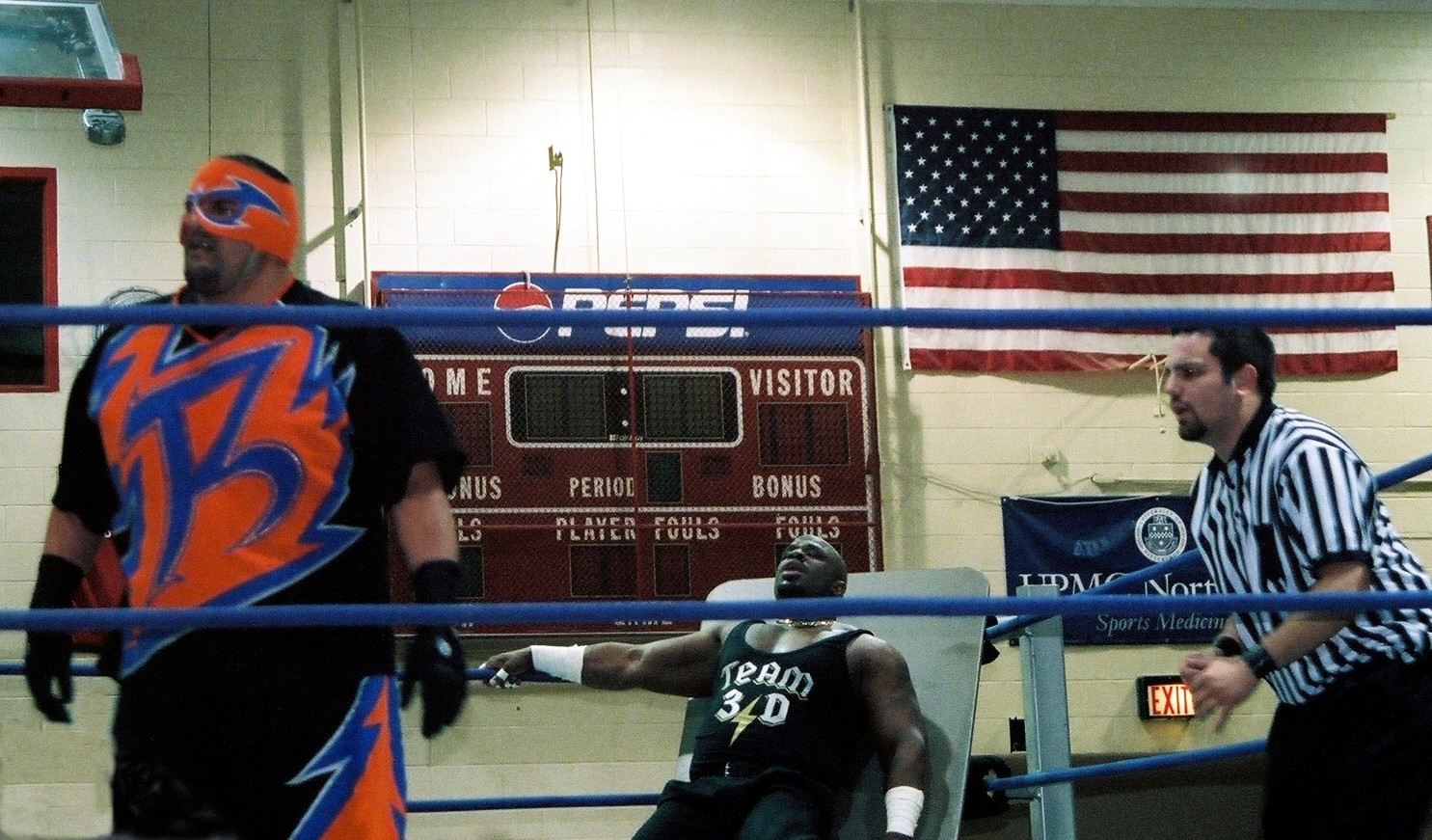
Anoaʻi as Rosey facing Brother Devon in Franklin, Pennsylvania, in 2006

During 2006 and 2007, he also competed for a number of independent promotions, including Great Championship Wrestling, BAW Championship Wrestling, and the Appalachian Wrestling Federation. He also returned to Heartland Wrestling Association for a few matches from 2006 to 2007 with one of the appearances being him challenging Jon Moxley for the HWA Heavyweight Championship on June 10, 2006, at HWA Road to Destiny.

He wrestled a dark match being billed under his real name for WWE on August 20, 2007, before an episode of Raw; he was defeated by Johnny Jeter. He returned the following day for the August 21 SmackDown! taping, where he was again defeated by Jeter. Anoaʻi began wrestling in Ohio Valley Wrestling (OVW) in September 2007, WWE's developmental territory, although he was not under contract with WWE. He wrestled several tag team matches with Afa Jr. as the Sons of Samoa, before leaving the promotion.

He returned to wrestling on the independent circuit, competing for companies including EWF. On Saturday, October 31, 2009, Anoaʻi (wrestling as Rosie – Super Hero In Training) made his debut for the Dynamic Wrestling Alliance defeating "Sexy" Sean Casey at the DWA's Monster Ball event in Cincinnati, which became the promotion's first televised event. His final match was on July 9, 2016, where he reunited with The Hurricane as the two teamed with Vinny Pacifico in a winning effort against Chris Benne, JGeorge, and Steve Scott.

Before his death, Rosey was running a wrestling promotion called Epic Championship Wrestling in Florida with his father, Sika.

== Other media ==
Anoaʻi was a contestant in the ABC reality series, Fat March in 2007. The show featured 12 overweight people attempting to walk about 570 miles (920 km) in nine states, in order to lose weight and get fit, while competing for a prize pool of US$1.2 million. A press release for the show stated that Anoaʻi was participating because "it wasn't safe for him to compete" as a professional wrestler, and he needed to "lose weight to return to his career". He left the show during the fifth episode due to a knee injury.

Outside of wrestling, Anoaʻi was involved in several business ventures including a restaurant in Cincinnati called Island Boi BBQ but returned to Florida to be closer to his family and was working with his father in Pensacola.

== Personal life and death ==
Anoaʻi's father was Samoan professional wrestler Sika Anoa‘i and his mother was Patricia Hooker. He was the brother of Joe Anoaʻi, better known in the WWE as Roman Reigns. Anoaʻi was half-Samoan and half-Italian. His ex-wife, Amanda Vandeberg Schall, current wife of former MMA fighter Kerry Schall, is from Mason, Ohio. They had two sons together, Jordan Iles and Koa Rodney Anoa'i, and a daughter Madison Alani Anoa'i.

In January 2014, Anoaʻi was hospitalized due to congestive heart failure (CHF; with which he had been diagnosed years earlier) and atrial fibrillation. Anoa’i's CHF was related to weight gain as he struggled with a chronic knee injury that also caused hip issues. He died on April 17, 2017, 10 days after his 47th birthday, in Pensacola, Florida, due to complications related to congestive heart failure.

== Championships and accomplishments ==
- Extreme Wrestling Federation
  - EWF Tag Team Championship (1 time) – with Charles Jackson
- Frontier Martial-Arts Wrestling / World Entertainment Wrestling
  - FMW/WEW Hardcore Tag Team Championship (1 time) – with Eddie Fatu
- International World Class Championship Wrestling
  - IWCCW Tag Team Championship (1 time, final) – with Sammy Silk
- Heartland Wrestling Association
  - HWA Tag Team Championship (2 times) – with Ekmo
- Memphis Championship Wrestling
  - MCW Southern Tag Team Championship (3 times) – with Ekmo
- National Wrestling League
  - NWL Tag Team Championship (1 time) – with L.A. Smooth
- Pro Wrestling Illustrated
  - PWI ranked him No. 92 of the top 500 singles wrestlers in the PWI 500 in 2005
- World Wrestling Council
  - WWC World Tag Team Championship (1 time) – with Tahiti
- World Wrestling Entertainment
  - World Tag Team Championship (1 time) – with The Hurricane
- World Xtreme Wrestling
  - WXW Tag Team Championship (3 times) – with L.A. Smooth
- Wrestling Observer Newsletter
  - Worst Tag Team (2002) with Eddie Fatu

== See also ==
- List of premature professional wrestling deaths
