= The Hurricane and Rosey =

Professional wrestling tag team

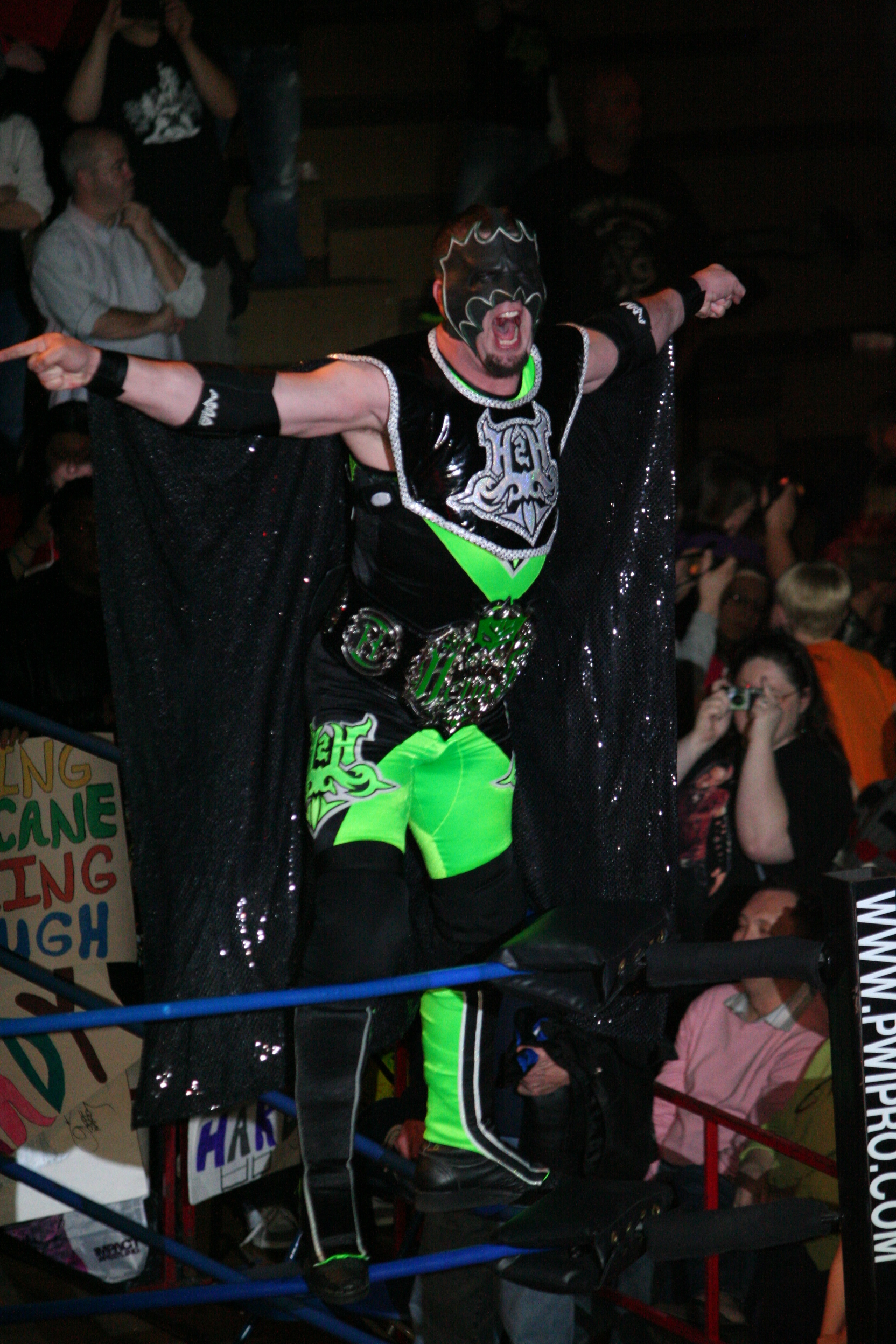
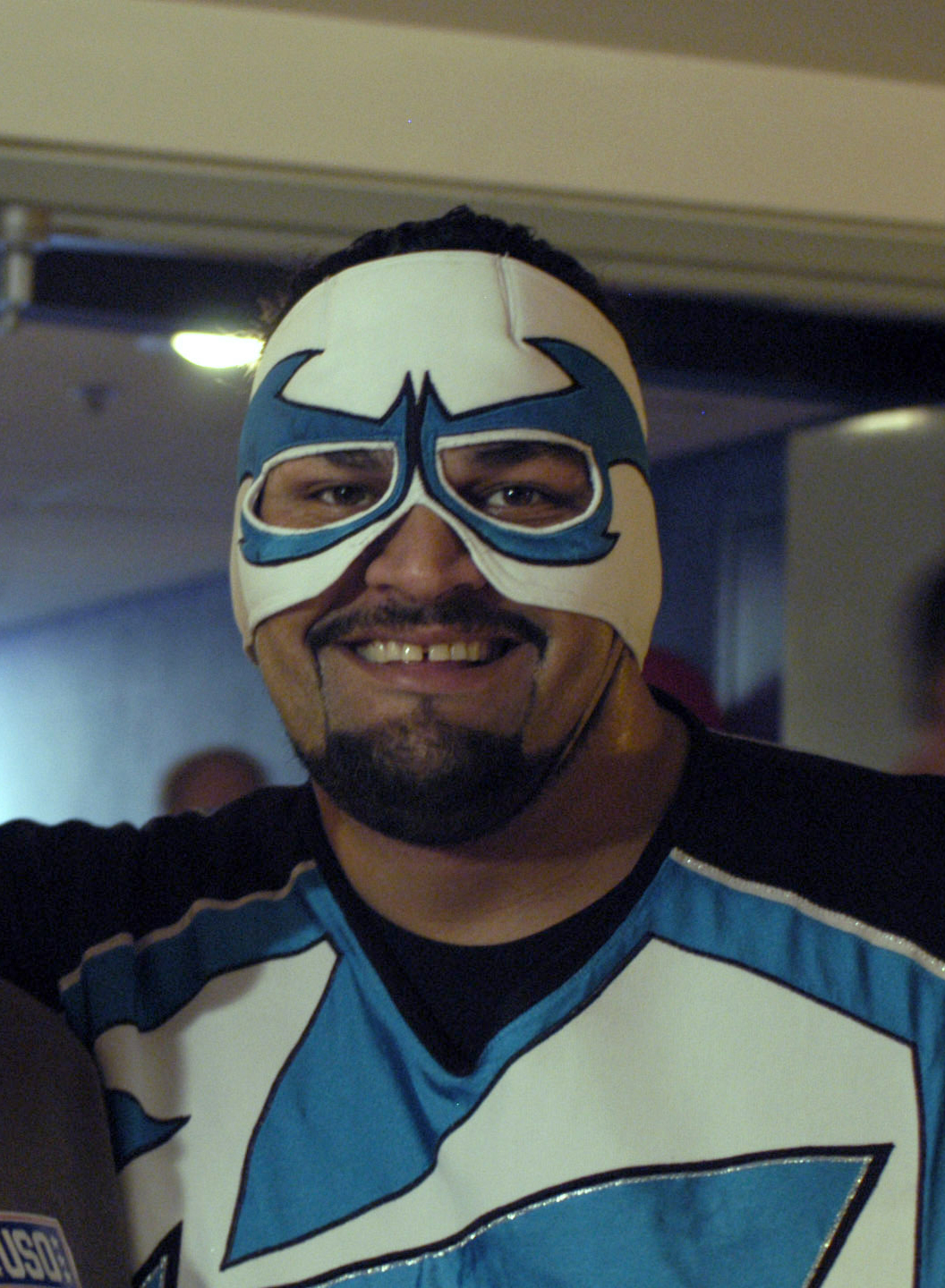
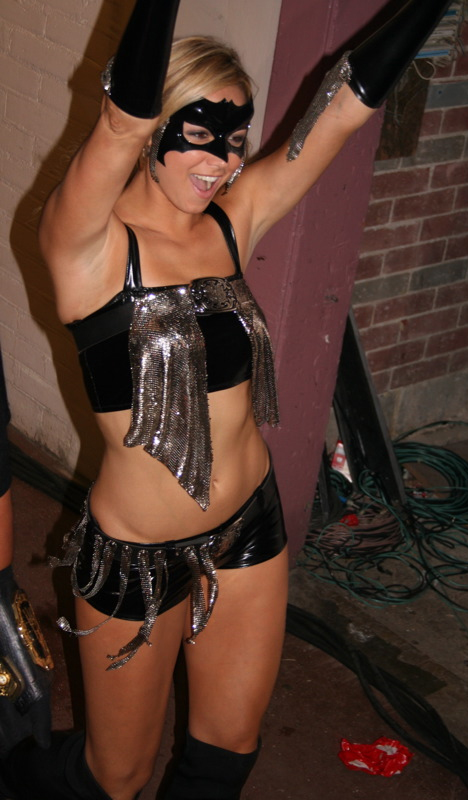
- From left to right: The Hurricane, Rosey, and their valet Super Stacy.

Tag team
- Members: The Hurricane; Rosey; Super Stacy (valet)
- Name(s): The Hurricane and Rosey; The Superheroes
- Billed heights: The Hurricane: 6 ft 0 in (1.83 m); Rosey: 6 ft 7 in (2.01 m)
- Combined billed weight: 580 lb (260 kg)
- Debut: August 15, 2003
- Disbanded: October 24, 2005
- Years active: 2003–2005

The Hurricane and Rosey (also known unofficially as The Super Heroes) were a professional wrestling tag team in World Wrestling Entertainment (WWE) based on the Raw brand. While in the WWE, their ring personas were those of a duo of superheroes.

In mid-2003, The Hurricane "discovered" Rosey and from there on they wrestled together as a tag team. Two years later, they won the World Tag Team Championship. During that time, The Hurricane and Rosey joined forces with Stacy Keibler, who adopted a superhero ring persona and the name Super Stacy. After losing the World Tag Team title, the team disbanded.

== History ==
=== Formation (2003–2004) ===
Shortly after Rosey's tag team partner Jamal was released from WWE in June 2003, The Hurricane "discovered" Rosey's potential as a superhero, and christened him Rosey, the Super Hero in Training (or the S.H.I.T.). Throughout this time, Rosey came to the ring clad in makeshift superhero costumes, with each clearly depicting the S.H.I.T. reference on the front, and skits aired weekly showing Rosey training to be a superhero.

The Hurricane and Rosey made their debut as a tag team on August 15, 2003, and competed sporadically on Raw, making more regular appearances on Heat. They faced the teams of Christian and Chris Jericho, and Evolution, before beginning a long-running feud with La Résistance. The feud continued for most of 2004, and The Hurricane and Rosey faced La Résistance several times on Raw and pay-per-view, including at Backlash. On the July 19, 2004 episode of Raw, Rosey appeared with a new costume, showing that he seemingly graduated to a full superhero. The Hurricane and Rosey finished out the year competing against teams including Rhyno and Tajiri, and Val Venis and Steven Richards.

=== World Tag Team Champions (2004–2005) ===
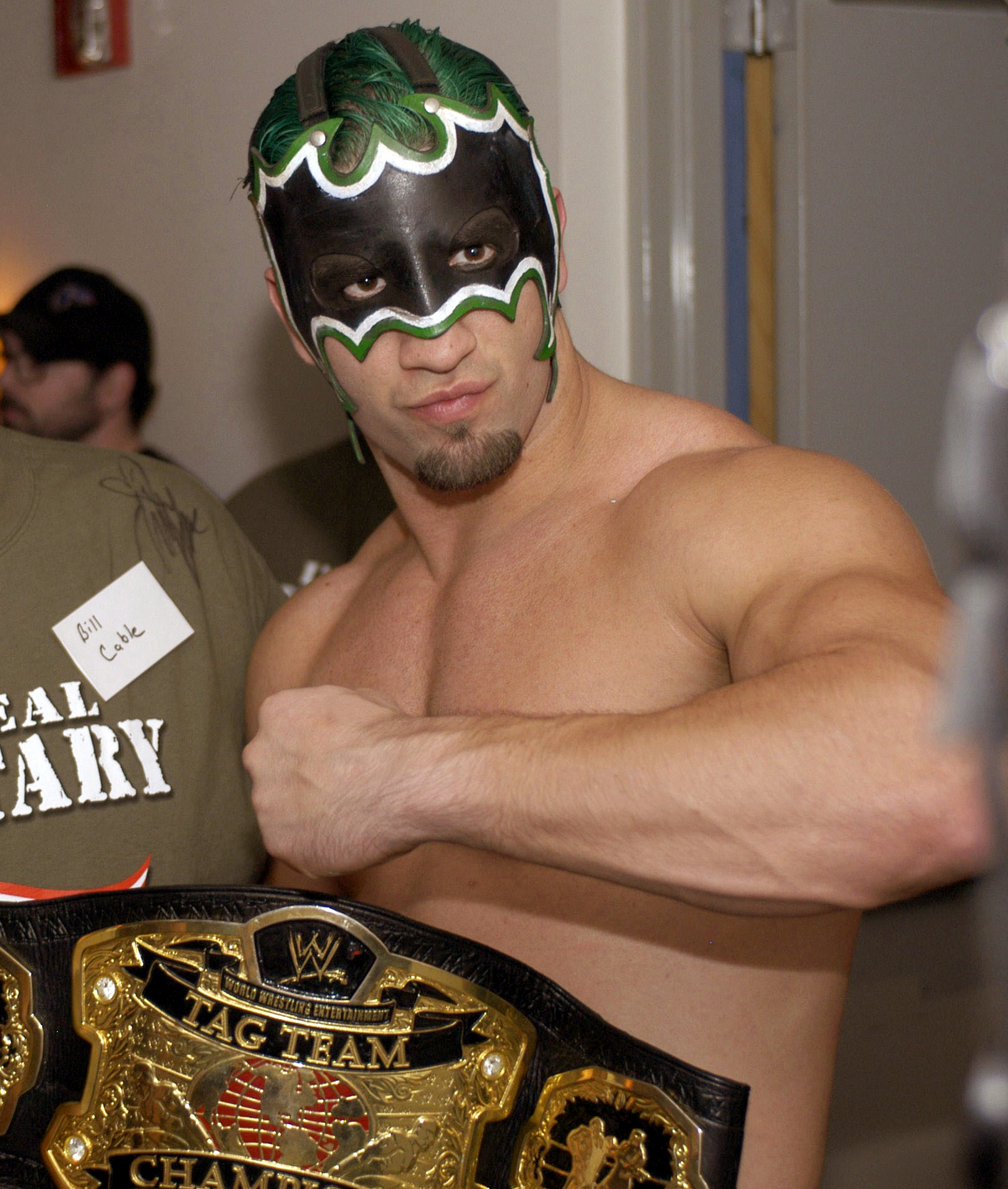
The Hurricane as World Tag Team Champion

In early 2005 at May's pay-per-view event Backlash, The Hurricane and Rosey won the World Tag Team Championship in a Tag Team Turmoil match after defeating then-champions Tajiri and William Regal, The Heart Throbs (Romeo and Antonio), Simon Dean and Maven and La Résistance (Robért Conway and Sylvain Grenier) by last eliminating La Résistance. During this time, the team successfully retained the championship against various teams, including La Résistance, Simon Dean and Maven, and The Heart Throbs.

While on Raw, Stacy Keibler joined forces with The Hurricane and Rosey, acting as their valet. She accompanied them to the ring wearing a mask and superhero costume of her own, calling herself "Super Stacy" until she was traded to the SmackDown! brand on August 22.

On the September 5, 2005 episode of Raw, The Hurricane and Rosey were defeated by the team of Lance Cade and Trevor Murdoch in Cade and Murdoch's debut match for the brand. Although this was a non-title match, the pair earned themselves a title match at the September pay-per-view, Unforgiven. During the title match at the event, Murdoch delivered an elevated DDT on The Hurricane outside the ring. The DDT caused The Hurricane to suffer a storyline "stinger" and allowed Cade and Murdoch to beat the injured Hurricane later in the match to win the World Tag Team Championship.

=== Split and aftermath (2005) ===
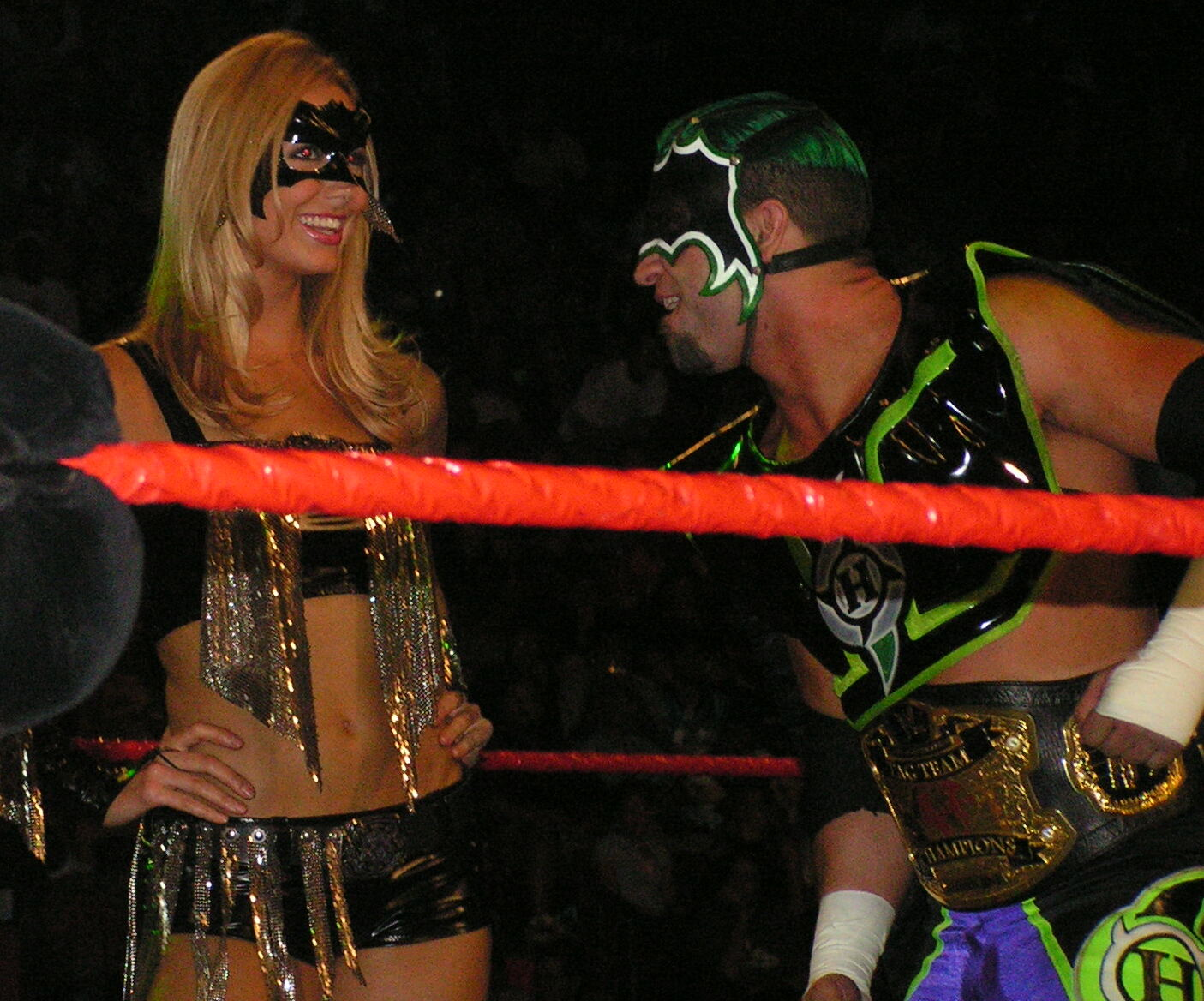
Super Stacy (left) and The Hurricane (right) in 2005

The loss of the World Tag Team Championship signalled the end of the team; in the following weeks, the pair began a losing streak, mainly caused by The Hurricane's injuries. During the October 17 episode of Raw, The Hurricane was assaulted by Kurt Angle at the request of Vince McMahon. After the beating, footage was shown of The Hurricane ripping off his mask and striking Rosey (who had come to the ring to his aid).

The following week on Raw, The Hurricane did not show up in a World Tag Team Championship match leaving Rosey to face Cade and Murdoch alone. During the match, The Hurricane (out of costume) appeared at the top of the entrance ramp, now going by his real name, Gregory Helms, and watched as Rosey was double teamed and defeated. After the match, Helms announced that he was fed up with being funny for the crowd and that he had been carrying Rosey as a tag team partner. Helms requested a match with Rosey, and defeated him with a shining wizard to end their partnership permanently. This was one of Rosey's last matches with WWE, as he was released in March 2006 while Helms went on to win his third Cruiserweight Championship at the 2006 Royal Rumble in January, resulting in Helms returning to the SmackDown roster and subsequently establishing himself outside The Hurricane identity, while Stacy Keibler left WWE in July 2006. The Hurricane was released from his WWE contract in February 2010.

On July 9, 2016, The Hurricane and Rosey reunited at the Ultimate Survival event held by Warriors Of Wrestling, teaming with Vinny Pacifico to defeat Chris Benne, JGeorge and Steve Scott in a six-man tag team match. Rosey died of a heart failure in April 2017. Stacy Keibler was inducted into the WWE Hall of Fame in 2023, while The Hurricane remains with the company as a backstage producer.

== Championships and accomplishments ==
- World Wrestling Entertainment
  - World Tag Team Championship (1 time) – The Hurricane and Rosey
  - WWE Hall of Fame (Class of 2023) – Stacy Keibler
