= Gregory Helms =

American professional wrestler (born 1974)

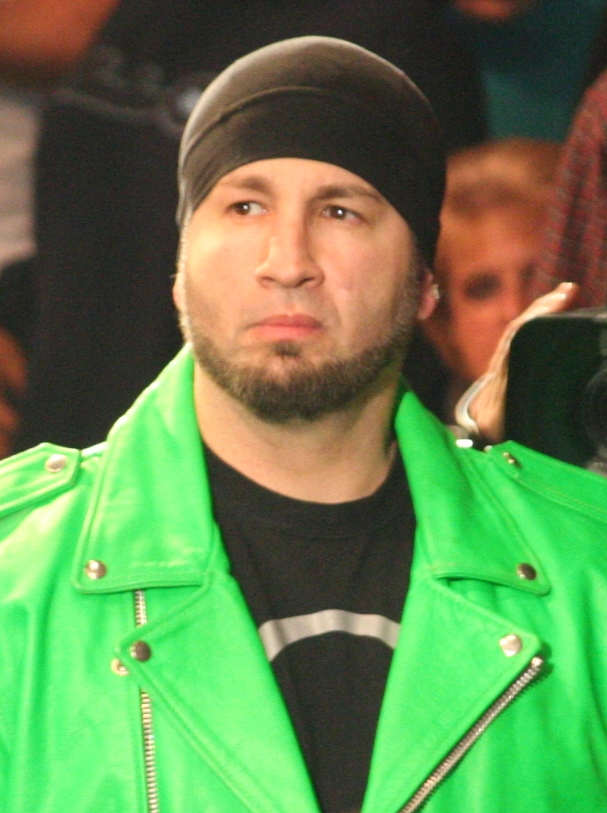
- Helms in 2015

Personal information
- Born: Gregory Shane Helms; July 12, 1974 (age 52) Smithfield, North Carolina, U.S.
- Children: 2

Professional wrestling career
- Ring name(s): Gregory Hanes; Gregory Helms; Gregory Shane Helms; The Hurricane; Hurricane Helms; Shane Helms
- Billed height: 6 ft 0 in (183 cm)
- Billed weight: 215 lb (98 kg)
- Billed from: Smithfield, North Carolina, U.S.
- Debut: July 6, 1990

Gregory Shane Helms (born July 12, 1974) is an American professional wrestler. He is signed to WWE under a legends contract, and works as a producer for WWE programming. In WWE, Helms has wrestled as The Hurricane, Gregory Helms, and Hurricane Helms. He is also known for his time with World Championship Wrestling (WCW), where he wrestled as "Sugar" Shane Helms.

Helms first began wrestling in 1991 at the age of 17, and wrestled in numerous independent promotions, including the Organization of Modern Extreme Grappling Arts, winning numerous light heavyweight and tag team championships. In 1999, he signed with WCW, and gained fame as "Sugar" Shane Helms, a member of 3 Count. During his time there he won both the WCW Hardcore Championship and the WCW Cruiserweight Championship. When WCW was bought by the World Wrestling Federation (WWF, now WWE), Helms' contract was kept by WWF. In 2001, Helms debuted a superhero themed gimmick for the WWF, renaming himself "The Hurricane". As The Hurricane, Helms won the WWE Cruiserweight Championship and the World Tag Team Championship (with Rosey) once each.

Helms dropped the superhero gimmick in 2005, and began wrestling under his real name. He once again won the Cruiserweight Championship in early 2006, and held it for over a year, becoming the longest reigning Cruiserweight Champion and the longest reigning champion of any kind in SmackDown history. After being out of action for over a year due to surgery, Helms returned to SmackDown in September 2008, referring to himself as Hurricane Helms, before moving to the ECW brand where he appeared as both Gregory Helms and The Hurricane. After the ECW brand ended, Helms was released by WWE in February 2010, but he has since returned to WWE as a producer and occasional wrestler.

== Professional wrestling career ==
=== Early career (1991–1999) ===
Helms began wrestling at the age of 17 in 1991. He won his first championship shortly afterwards, by defeating "Playboy" T.C. Cruise to become the Southern Wrestling Alliance (SWA) Light Heavyweight Champion. Helms spent the majority of his early career in his home state of North Carolina, winning numerous light heavyweight championships.

Helms began calling himself "The Show" Shane Helms, and teamed with "Big Daddy" Mike Maverick, initially using the team name Assault and Battery. They later dubbed themselves The Serial Thrillaz, and won several independent tag championships. The pair also began wrestling in the Organization of Modern Extreme Grappling Arts (OMEGA), which was founded by The Hardy Boyz (Matt and Jeff). The Serial Thrillaz won the OMEGA Tag Team Championship twice between 1997 and 1998, before they began competing for Southern Championship Wrestling (SCW). They won the SCW Tag Team Championship, and Helms also won the SCW Heavyweight Championship. SCW would mark the end of the Serial Thrillaz, as Helms vacated both titles before moving on to NWA Worldwide. Once there, Helms joined the Bad Street Boys with Shannon Moore, Christian York, and Joey Matthews.

=== World Championship Wrestling (1999–2001) ===
Helms and his friend Shannon Moore signed with World Championship Wrestling (WCW) in May 1999. In WCW, Helms, along with Moore and Evan Karagias, formed the heel (villainous) stable (faction) 3 Count, and the trio debuted on the December 23 episode of WCW Thunder. The trio was a parody of the boy bands 'N Sync and the Backstreet Boys, and their gimmick involved making music videos and performing songs before their matches.

3 Count collectively won the WCW Hardcore Championship on WCW Monday Nitro in February 2000. This win made 3 Count the first trio to win the Hardcore Championship. At Uncensored, Brian Knobbs defeated all members of 3 Count to win the Hardcore Championship. During a match, Helms suffered a broken nose, and was sidelined while he recovered. Upon his return, Tank Abbott had been added to the group, as a fan, and was utilized in an enforcer role. 3 Count had a long-running feud (scripted rivalry) with The Jung Dragons, with the Dragons attempting to steal 3 Count's fictional recording contract. This led to a ladder match between the two teams at New Blood Rising, which 3 Count won due to Abbott's interference. As a result, Abbott claimed that he should be the lead singer of 3 Count, and was kicked out by the other three members, leading to a feud.

3 Count later disbanded as Moore and Helms kicked Karagias out of the group for attempting to steal the spotlight. At the same time, the Jung Dragons turned on Jamie Noble, who formed a team with Karagias. The three teams met in a Triangle match at Mayhem, which 3 Count won. They also wrestled each other in a number one contendership ladder match at Starrcade, to earn a WCW Cruiserweight Championship match, in which both Moore and Helms grabbed the contract at the same time. As a result, they later wrestled for the opportunity to wrestle for the championship, which Helms won, although he lost the subsequent championship match to Chavo Guerrero Jr. at the Sin pay-per-view.

Moore and Helms would leave WCW briefly in 2001 to wrestle in NWA Wildside, where they held the Wildside Tag Team Championship for one day. Helms became the number one contender for the Cruiserweight Championship after winning a match at SuperBrawl Revenge, but was attacked by Karagias and Moore afterwards. Despite the attack, Helms would go on to defeat Guerrero for the WCW Cruiserweight Championship at Greed and was the reigning Cruiserweight Champion immediately before WCW was bought out by the World Wrestling Federation (WWF). Helms' contract with WCW was one of twenty-five that were included in WWF's purchase of WCW.

=== World Wrestling Federation / Entertainment (2001–2010) ===
==== Early appearances (2001–2002) ====
Helms made his WWF debut on the July 5, 2001 episode of SmackDown!, using the name "Hollywood" Gregory Helms. He was part of the Invasion storyline as a member of The Alliance losing his Cruiserweight Championship in a one-on-one match to another Alliance member, Billy Kidman.

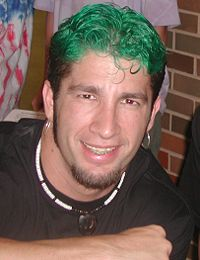
Helms at an autograph signing in June 2002

Helms began wrestling as "The Hurricane" on the August 27 episode of Raw is War, and also began wearing a superhero costume. That night, he won the WWF European Championship from Matt Hardy with help from Ivory, but lost it to Bradshaw on the October 22 episode of Raw. In September, The Hurricane formed a tag team with Lance Storm who was now managed by Ivory and Hurricane later picked up a sidekick, in Molly Holly who began to call herself "Mighty Molly", and the two came to the arena in a custom "Hurri-Cycle" (with Molly in the sidecar). The team of The Hurricane and Storm began feuds with teams like The Hardy Boyz and Big Show and Spike Dudley. The Hurricane and Storm got a shot at the WCW Tag Team Championship against The Hardy Boyz at No Mercy on October 21 in a losing effort.

The Hurricane won the WWF Hardcore Championship at WrestleMania X8 on March 17, 2002, but Molly betrayed him, hitting him in the back of the head with a frying pan, and defeating him for the championship. The Hurricane was later drafted to the SmackDown! brand following the brand extension, and he won the WWE Cruiserweight Championship from Tajiri and Billy Kidman in a triple threat match on the May 16 episode of SmackDown!. He lost it to Jamie Noble at King of the Ring on June 23. The Hurricane was traded to the Raw brand, won the WWE Tag Team Championship with Kane as they defeated The Un-Americans (Christian and Lance Storm) on the September 23 episode of Raw, and held them for around a month before losing the titles to Chris Jericho and Christian on the October 14 episode of Raw.

==== Teaming with Rosey (2003–2006) ====
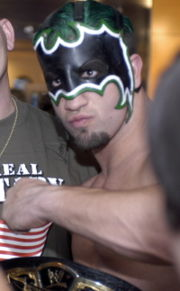
Helms as "The Hurricane" with the World Tag Team Championship

In early 2003, The Hurricane feuded with The Rock. In backstage segments, The Rock referred to The Hurricane as "The Hamburglar" (in part because his mask was similar to the Hamburglar's) and later retorted that anyone can beat The Rock, citing Brendan Fraser, whom The Rock worked with on the movie "The Mummy Returns". The feud culminated in a match on the March 10 episode of Raw, in which The Rock dominated. The Hurricane, however, was able to roll up The Rock from behind after The Rock was distracted by Stone Cold Steve Austin's appearance on the ramp.

In August, The Hurricane "discovered" Rosey's potential as a superhero and christened him "Rosey, the Super Hero in Training" (the "S.H.I.T."). On May 1, 2005, at Backlash, The Hurricane and Rosey defeated La Résistance in the finals of a Tag Team Turmoil match to win the World Tag Team Championship. Not long after winning the championship, Stacy Keibler joined Rosey and The Hurricane as their sidekick, "Super Stacy". In August, Rosey and The Hurricane lost Keibler as their sidekick when she and Christy Hemme were traded to the SmackDown! brand. On the September 5 episode of Raw, The Hurricane and Rosey were defeated by Lance Cade and Trevor Murdoch during Cade and Murdoch's debut match on Raw. As a result, Cade and Murdoch earned a title match at Unforgiven on September 18. During the title match, Murdoch delivered an elevated DDT on The Hurricane to the outside. The DDT caused The Hurricane to suffer a storyline "stinger" and allowed Cade and Murdoch to beat The Hurricane and Rosey later in the match to win the World Tag Team Championship.

During the next few weeks, the pair began a losing streak, mainly caused by The Hurricane's on-screen injuries. During the October 17 episode of Raw, The Hurricane was assaulted by Kurt Angle at the request of Vince McMahon. After the beating, footage was shown of The Hurricane ripping off his mask and striking Rosey because he did not help him fend off Angle. The next week, The Hurricane no-showed a World Tag Team Championship match, leaving Rosey to face the champions Cade and Murdoch alone. During the match, The Hurricane (out of costume) appeared at the top of the entrance ramp, reverting to his real name, Gregory Helms, and watched as Rosey was double teamed and defeated. After the match, Helms announced that he was fed up with being funny for the crowd, and that he was sick of carrying Rosey as a tag team partner, turning heel for the first time since 2001. On the November 7 episode of Raw, Helms and Rosey faced off in a singles match, which Helms won. Subsequently, Helms wrestled mostly on Raw's sister show, Heat. On the January 2, 2006 episode of Raw, Helms confronted Jerry Lawler over jokes that Lawler had been making at Helms' expense, and Lawler said that when Helms was The Hurricane, he was entertaining and called Helms a joke. Helms responded by slapping Lawler, who hit Helms back. This confrontation led to Lawler defeating Helms in a match at New Year's Revolution on January 8.

==== Cruiserweight Champion (2006–2007) ====
At the Royal Rumble on January 29, Helms participated in an Open Invitational match for the Cruiserweight Championship and won, even though he was a Raw superstar and the championship was defended solely on SmackDown!. As a result, he moved to the SmackDown! brand to start a feud with Nunzio, Kid Kash and the other cruiserweights. During this time, Helms defeated Nunzio in a one-on-one match. The next week, he was supposed to defend against Kid Kash, but Kash was away on a family emergency, so Scotty 2 Hotty took his place. Helms defeated him and declared that he was better than all the other cruiserweights. As a result, all the cruiserweights at the show invaded the ring and attacked Helms. It was later announced by SmackDown! General Manager Theodore Long that at No Way Out on February 19, Helms would face all the cruiserweights in a match for the title. Helms was able to retain the championship. Later, Long mandated that Helms had to defend his title against a cruiserweight each week on SmackDown! to prove that he truly was better than all the cruiserweights. Helms' first defense under this new rule was against Psicosis of The Mexicools; Helms retained by cheating.

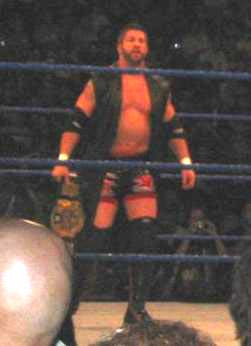
Helms has the longest reign in WWE Cruiserweight Championship history, holding the championship for 13 consecutive months in 2006 and 2007.

In early March, Helms suffered a broken nose. After complaining to Long about having to wrestle on the March 10 episode of SmackDown!, Long told Helms that he did not have to defend his title, but put Helms in a champion versus champion match against the United States Champion, Chris Benoit. During the match, Helms attempted to leave, but was blocked by other cruiserweights who threw Helms back into the ring, resulting in Helms losing the match. Helms underwent successful surgery on his nose and was expected to miss five to six weeks. During this time SmackDown! announcers stated that Helms had a no-compete clause in his contract allowing him to waive the thirty-day title defense rule due to any injury. Helms returned to the ring on the April 28 episode of SmackDown!, teaming with MNM to face Super Crazy, London and Kendrick in a six-man tag team match. Helms continued to defend his belt during pay-per-views, but he made more regular appearances on SmackDown!'s sister show, Velocity.

Helms continued defending his title against other cruiserweights, while on occasion facing off against SmackDown!'s other title holders in champion versus champion matches. Helms faced World Heavyweight Champion Rey Mysterio on June 16 and United States Champion Bobby Lashley on July 7 but lost both matches. Eventually, Helms became the longest cruiserweight champion in WWE history, as well as the longest reigning champion of any kind in SmackDown! history. For much of late 2006, he feuded with Matt Hardy, with whom Helms exchanged several victories in matches on SmackDown!. In Helms' hometown of Raleigh, North Carolina, at No Mercy on October 8, Hardy beat Helms. The two rivals also joined opposing teams at Survivor Series on November 26, where Helms was in Team Rated-RKO, and Hardy was a member of Team DX; Team Rated-RKO lost the match.

Helms went on to feud with Jimmy Wang Yang over the Cruiserweight Championship, after a tag team match in which Matt Hardy and Yang defeated Helms and Sylvan on the November 10 episode of SmackDown!. The feud ended after Helms defeated him to retain the title at Armageddon on December 17. In 2007, Helms once again feuded with the entire Cruiserweight division on SmackDown!. During this feud, Helms' reign as Cruiserweight Champion came to an end at No Way Out on February 18, when he was unable to win a Cruiserweight open invitational, which saw Chavo Guerrero win the championship. Shortly after losing the championship, Helms formed a tag team with Guerrero, but they did not win any matches as a team.

On May 18, WWE reported that Helms had broken two vertebrae in his neck, one of which was pressing on his spinal cord. He underwent surgery with Dr. Lloyd Youngblood to repair them approximately a week later. Following the surgery, Helms was announced to be out for a year and a half due to the injury.

==== The Hurricane's return (2008–2010) ====
Helms returned on the September 19, 2008, episode of SmackDown in a non-wrestling role. Throughout the show, he appeared in short video promos, called "Hurrapops", referring to himself as "Hurricane Helms", a modified version of his old ring name "The Hurricane", and mocked heel superstars including Shelton Benjamin and Curt Hawkins and Zack Ryder. In the following weeks, he mocked several other superstars in the "Hurrapops", ending each promo with the phrase, "I'm just sayin'!". On the November 28 episode of SmackDown, a "Hurrapop" appeared in which Helms announced that he would make his return to the ring on the next episode of SmackDown. On the December 5 episode of SmackDown, Helms defeated Montel Vontavious Porter (MVP) in his ring return. Helms was quickly scripted into a feud with the United States Champion Shelton Benjamin, defeating him in two non-title matches on SmackDown, although he failed to win a championship match on December 26.

On April 15, 2009, Helms was drafted to the ECW brand as part of the 2009 Supplemental Draft. Helms made his ECW debut as a backstage interviewer on April 28, 2009, reverting to his Gregory Helms ring name, interviewing Evan Bourne. He started a storyline where, while he was interviewing someone, a scripted accident would occur, leading to Helms leaving the interview seconds before the person in distress was saved by The Hurricane. On the August 11, 2009 episode of ECW, Helms was attacked by Paul Burchill after Helms denied being The Hurricane. The Hurricane later attacked Burchill in the ring dressed in his Hurricane attire, to save Yoshi Tatsu. The next week on ECW, he made his in-ring debut for the brand as The Hurricane, and defeated Burchill. He continued to feud with Burchill, who attempted to expose The Hurricane's true identity, until the November 17 episode of ECW when The Hurricane defeated Burchill in a mask versus career match. He would then feud with Zack Ryder.

On February 26, 2010, Helms was released from his WWE contract.

=== Independent circuit (2010–2015) ===
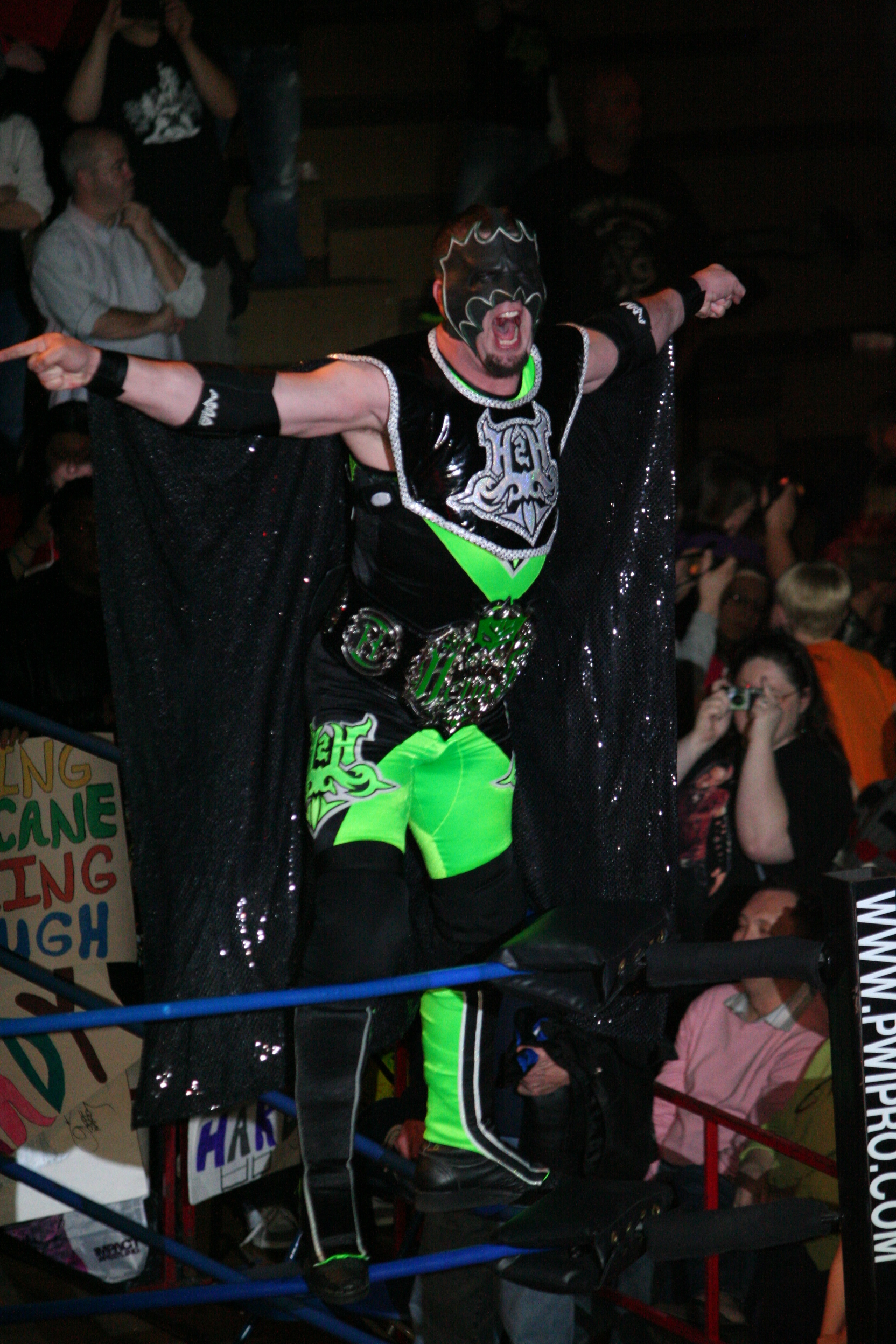
Helms posing on the turnbuckle as The Hurricane in January 2012

Following his WWE release, Helms began wrestling on the independent circuit, including for the Canadian Wrestling's Elite as Hurricane Helms. On October 23, 2010, Helms made his debut for Jersey All Pro Wrestling, where he, under his Hurricane gimmick, defeated Azrieal. On January 10, 2011, Helms signed a contract with Lucha Libre USA. In the promotion, Helms allied himself with Marco Corleone, and in his debut for the promotion at the January 22 tapings, he defeated Corleone's rival and Lucha Libre USA Champion Lizmark Jr. via disqualification.

On January 29, 2011, Helms made his debut for Pro Wrestling Guerrilla (PWG), during the WrestleReunion 5 weekend, in a match, where he was defeated by Joey Ryan. He also took part in 20-Man Legends Battle Royale, making his second appearance of the night. He eliminated Cruel Connection, but later was thrown out by Shane Douglas and Terry Funk.

In April 2011, Helms wrestled at Carolina Wrestling Federation (Mid-Atlantic) where he defeated Ric Converse and won the vacant PWI International Heavyweight Championship. In 2013, Helms returned to the revived OMEGA, now called OMEGA Championship Wrestling, and on October 12, he defeated Shane Williams to advance in a tournament for the OMEGA Championship. On November 16, 2013, Helms was defeated by Chris Hero at a Pro Wrestling Syndicate event.

=== Total Nonstop Action Wrestling / Impact Wrestling (2015–2017) ===
In March 2015, Helms received a tryout for Total Nonstop Action Wrestling (TNA, now Impact Wrestling) as an agent and began working for the company within that capacity that same month. At Bound for Glory, Helms made his on-screen debut under his full birth name to congratulate the TNA X Division Champion Tigre Uno.

On the February 2, 2016 episode of Impact Wrestling, Helms assisted Trevor Lee in defeating Tigre Uno for the X Division Championship, turning villainous in the process. Helms would then soon bring in Andrew Everett to officially form The Helms Dynasty. On the December 15 episode of Impact Wrestling dubbed "Total Nonstop Deletion", Helms was thrown into the "Lake of Reincarnation", and emerged as his 3 Count alter ego "Sugar" Shane Helms, and after insulting Lee and Everett's dance moves, was once again knocked into the lake by his teammates, Helms would later emerge from the lake as the Hurricane, where he would go on to assist Matt Hardy in defeating Lee and Everett.

On June 19, 2017 Helms announced his departure from Impact Wrestling.

=== Ring of Honor (2018–2019) ===
In June 2018, it was announced that Helms signed with Ring of Honor (ROH). He worked as wrestler and producer, including a feud against Marty Scurll.

=== Return to WWE (2018–present) ===
On January 28, 2018, at the Royal Rumble, Helms, as The Hurricane, entered the titular match as a surprise entrant at number 21 but was quickly eliminated by John Cena. One year later on January 28, 2019, it was announced that he would return to WWE in a backstage producer role. On July 19, 2019, The Hurricane attempted to win the WWE 24/7 Championship from R-Truth whilst he was being interviewed by IGN, though he was unable to do so. On July 22, 2019, The Hurricane made an appearance for the special Raw Reunion episode of Monday Night Raw. On April 15, 2020, Helms was furloughed by WWE, but returned to the promotion on November 22. The Hurricane once again appeared at the 2021 Royal Rumble event on January 31 in the namesake match. He entered at number 23 and was quickly eliminated by Big E and Bobby Lashley.

Helms announced on March 24, 2022, that he had signed a Legends deal with WWE.

=== All Elite Wrestling (2020) ===
Helms made an appearance in All Elite Wrestling (AEW) on November 7, 2020, during the Elite Deletion match under both The Hurricane and reporter Gregory Helms personas, in a supporting effort for Matt Hardy against Sammy Guevara.

== Other media ==
The Wrestling Figure Checklist records that Helms has had 20 different action figures released in the 2000s and 2010s.

As The Hurricane, Gregory Helms has been featured in several WWE video games, including WWE SmackDown! Shut Your Mouth (2002), WWE SmackDown! Here Comes the Pain (2003), WWE SmackDown! vs. Raw 2006 (2005), and WWE SmackDown vs. Raw 2008 (2007) for the PlayStation 2, WWE WrestleMania X8 (2002) for the Nintendo GameCube, and WWE Raw 2 (2003) the video game for the Xbox. Additionally, he is featured in WWE 2K22 as a DLC character (Stand Back Pack) alongside A-Kid, Wes Lee, and Stacy Keibler.

In March 2011, Shane Helms was featured on the “Lizard Lick Towing” show on TruTV. Alongside his friend Ron Shirley, show protagonist, Helms appears on the episode "Hometown Tour."

== Personal life ==
Helms was born in Smithfield, North Carolina, but he was raised in Wooster, Ohio. Helms is a comic book fan, and one of his favorite characters is the Green Lantern. He has a tattoo on his right shoulder which is the Lantern's logo and his original WWE character, The Hurricane, is inspired by the Green Lantern. It was picked and inked the same days as his cousin, fellow pro wrestling trainee, and comic book fan Mike Helm had the symbol of his favorite character, Green Lantern, tattooed on his own bicep. In 2008, he got a tattoo of his last name on his upper back. Helms owns a motorcycle called "The Hurri-Cycle", which he got when he was using The Hurricane gimmick. Helms is good friends with Jeff Hardy, Matt Hardy and Shannon Moore. He appears on The Hardy Show, The Hardys' internet show. He also performed as the stunt double of actor David Arquette in the movie Ready to Rumble.

On March 19, 2007, Sports Illustrated posted on its website an article in its continuing series investigating a steroid and HGH ring used by a number of professional athletes in several sports. That article mentioned several current and former WWE wrestlers, including Helms who was alleged to have obtained HGH. WWE has since made a statement on this situation, mentioning that the allegations preceded the Talent Wellness program WWE launched in April 2006. On August 30, 2007, an article by Sports Illustrated named Helms and nine other wrestlers to be given growth hormone not in compliance with the WWE Talent Wellness program. He was said to have received testosterone, HGH and nandrolone between November 2003 and February 2007.

In June 2012, Helms' girlfriend gave birth to his first child, a boy named Sebastian.

Helms is a weekly guest on the podcast "Keepin it 100" on the Jericho network. In 2016 and 2017, he appeared on a weekly podcast for Fightful.com.

=== Legal troubles ===
On May 6, 2008, Helms was assaulted in a club in Johnston County, North Carolina, by an acquaintance, Dustin Narron. An argument between the two of them led to Narron hitting Helms in the face. Narron was later charged with assault and battery.

On January 27, 2010, Helms and fellow WWE wrestler Chris Jericho were arrested in Fort Mitchell, Kentucky, after leaving a bar. A police report stated that Helms had punched Jericho and the other passengers in the cab they were sharing. Helms and Jericho were given tickets for public intoxication and released after each posted a $120 bail bond.

On March 13, 2011, Helms was cited for affray following an altercation at a bar in Smithfield, North Carolina.

On May 5, 2011, Helms and his girlfriend were involved in a motorbike accident in North Carolina, for which Helms was charged with driving under the influence. Helms suffered a broken leg, ankle, jaw and nose during the accident, as well as sustaining other fractures, while his girlfriend sustained a broken neck. As a result of the accident, Helms received over 200 stitches, and his leg and ankle had to be reconstructed with four plates and twenty-two screws.

== Championships and accomplishments ==
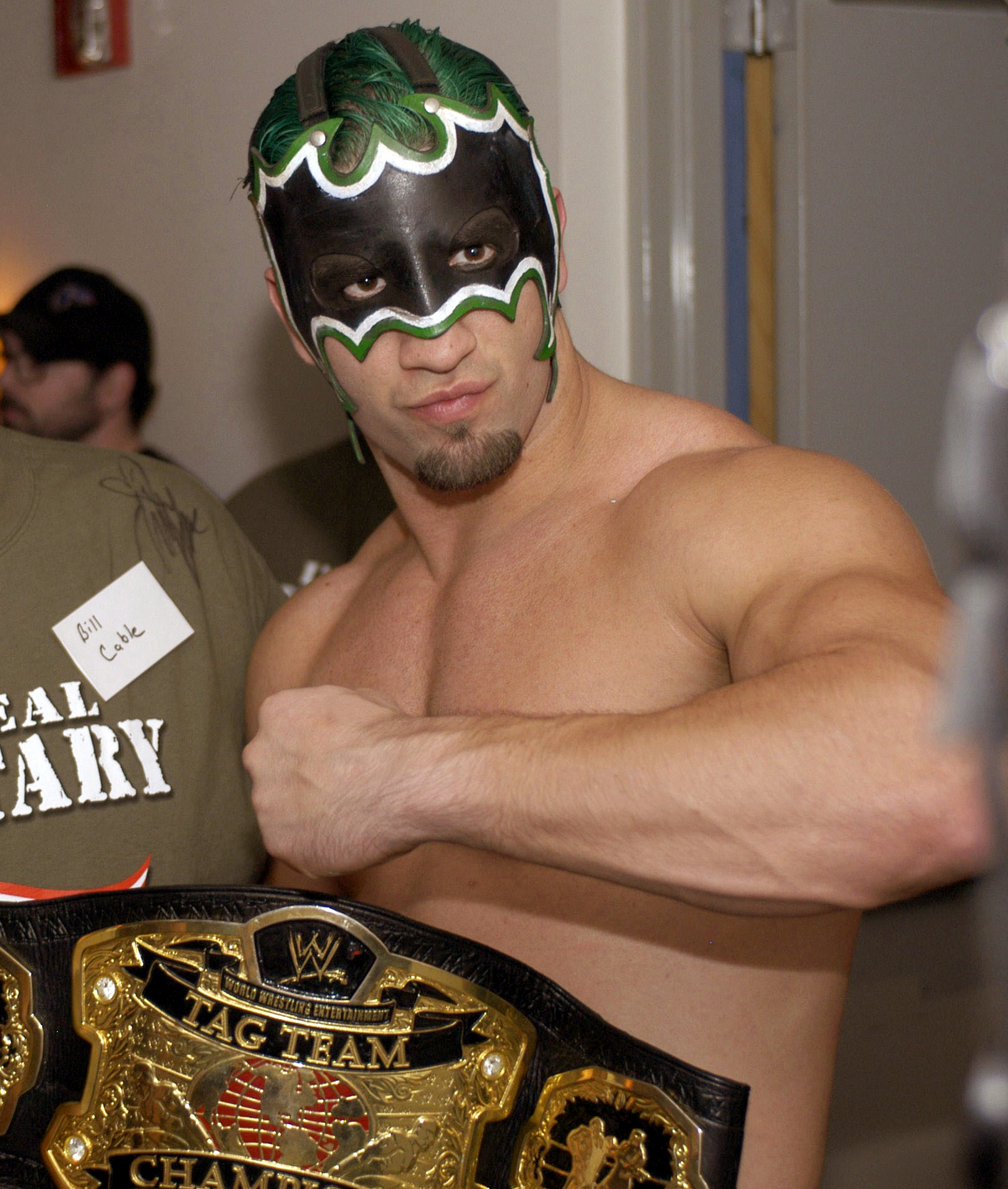
The Hurricane is a former World Tag Team Champion

- Carolina Championship Wrestling Alliance
  - CCWA Light Heavyweight Championship (2 times)
- Carolina Wrestling Federation Mid-Atlantic
  - CWF Mid-Atlantic Television Championship (1 time)
- Coastal Championship Wrestling
  - CCW Tag Team Championship (1 time) – with The Super Hero In Training
- Empire State Wrestling
  - ESW Tag Team Championship (1 time) – with Johnny Adams
- New Dimension Wrestling
  - NDW Tag Team Championship (1 time) – with Mike Maverick
- North American Pro Wrestling
  - NAPW Light Heavyweight Championship (1 time)
- NWA Wildside
  - NWA Wildside Tag Team Championship (1 time) – with Shannon Moore
- Organization of Modern Extreme Grappling Arts
  - OMEGA Tag Team Championship (2 times) – with Mike Maverick
- Pro Wrestling Illustrated
  - PWI ranked him 21 of the 500 best singles wrestlers in the PWI 500 in 2003
- Pro Wrestling International
  - PWI International Heavyweight Championship (2 time)
- Southern Championship Wrestling
  - SCW Heavyweight Championship (1 time)
  - SCW Tag Team Championship (1 time) – with Mike Maverick
- Southern Wrestling Alliance
  - SWA Light Heavyweight Championship (1 time)
- Texas Championship Wrestling
  - TCW Texas Tag Team Championship (1 time) – with Lenny Lane
- World Championship Wrestling
  - WCW Hardcore Championship (1 time) ^{[a]}
  - WCW Cruiserweight Championship (1 time)
- Wrestling For A Cause
  - WFC Tag Team Championship (1 time) – with Kryptonite
- World Wrestling Federation / Entertainment
  - WWE Cruiserweight Championship (2 times)
  - WWF European Championship (1 time)
  - WWF Hardcore Championship (1 time)
  - World Tag Team Championship (2 times) – with Kane (1) and Rosey (1)
- World Wrestling Organization
  - WWO Light Heavyweight Championship (1 time)
- Wrestling Observer Newsletter
  - Best Gimmick (2001)

=== Lucha de Apuesta record ===
Winner (wager)	Loser (wager)	Location	Event	Date	Notes
The Hurricane (mask)	Paul Burchill (career)	Philadelphia, Pennsylvania	ECW on SyFy	November 17, 2009	

== Footnotes ==
^{1} Helms was part of the group called 3 Count, which won the title jointly, and the WCW Hardcore Championship was defended under the Freebird Rule.
