= Fat March =

American reality television series

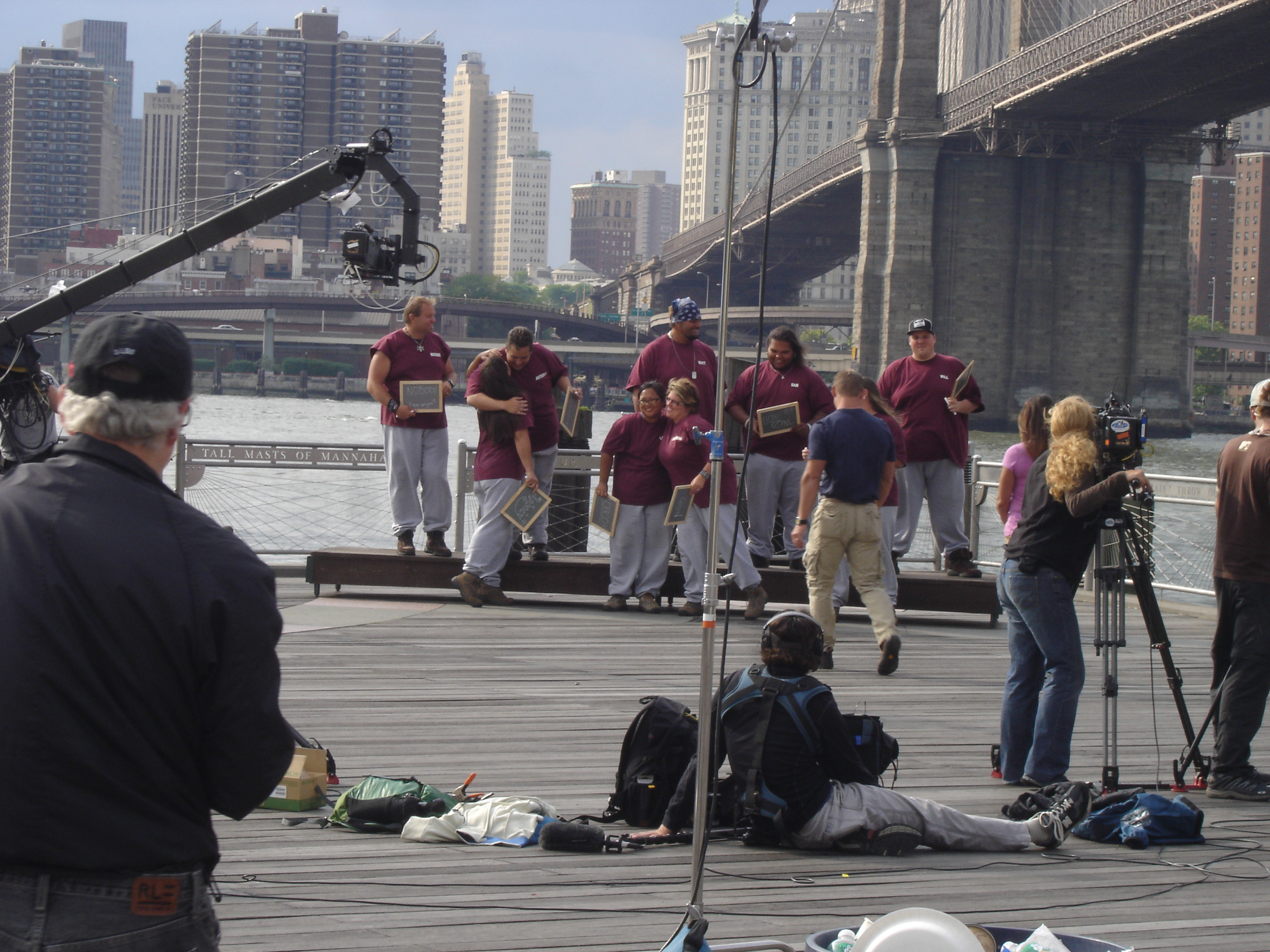
- A picture of a live taping of the show in New York.
- Country of origin: United States
- No. of seasons: 1
- No. of episodes: 6

Production
- Running time: 60 minutes

Original release
- Network: ABC
- Release: August 6 – September 10, 2007

Fat March is an American reality television series on the ABC network, based on the UK Channel Four series Too Big To Walk. It premiered on August 6, 2007, and ended on September 10, 2007.

== Synopsis ==
The show focuses on 12 individuals attempting to walk from the starting line of the Boston Marathon to Washington, D.C. for a prize of US$1.2 million.

The show focuses on teamwork by starting with the initial $1.2 million prize, which is to be divided evenly among each contestant to finish the walk. However, at the end of each episode, contestants have the opportunity to nominate any of their team for removal from the walk. Any time someone is voted out, is physically unable to continue, or chooses to stop, each remaining individual's share is cut by $10,000. Participants can choose to vote for no one. It only takes one vote for a person to be ejected; thus if 11 people vote for no one, but one person votes for someone, that one person who received one vote is eliminated.

== Participants ==
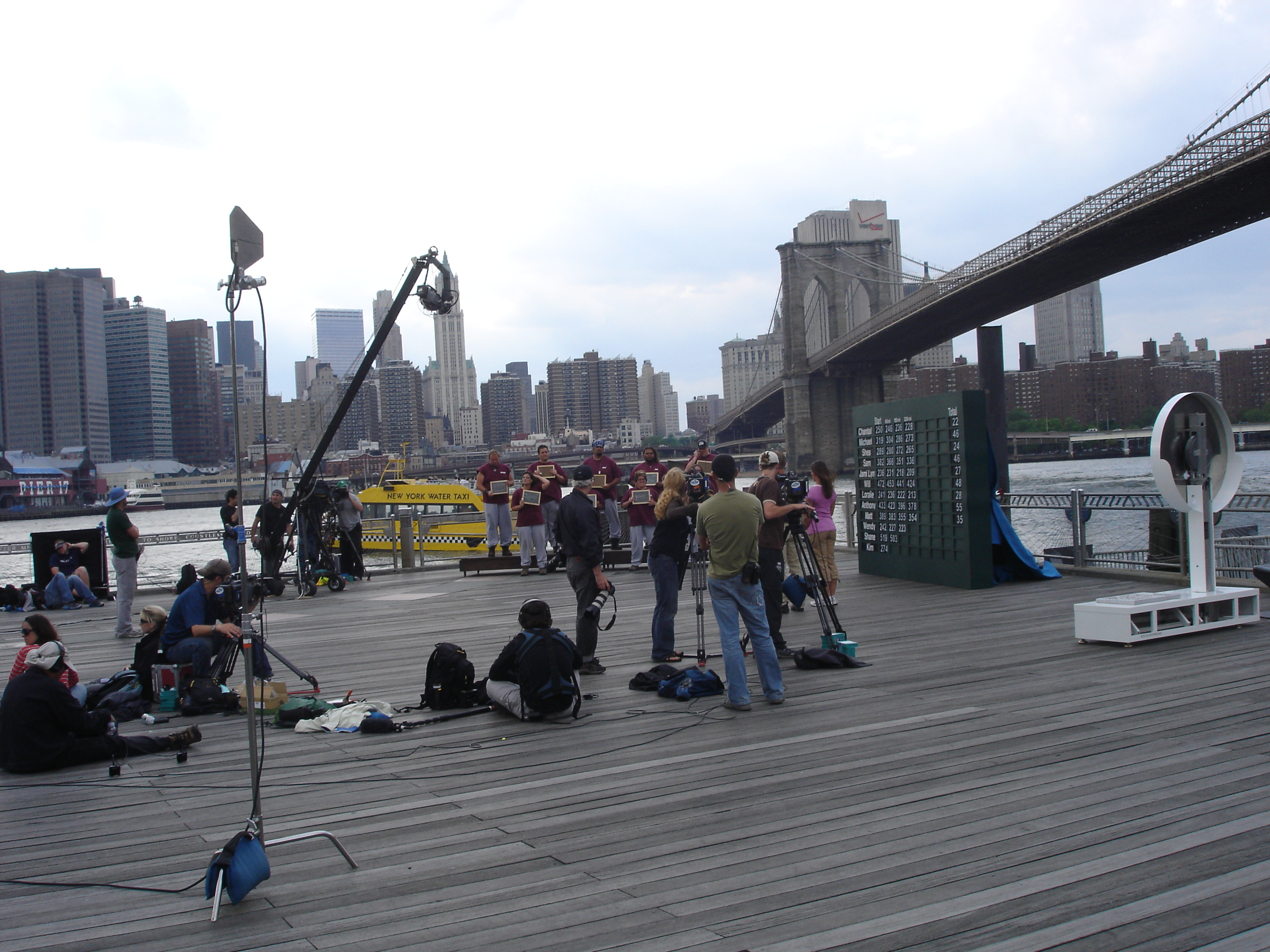
Another picture of a live taping of the show in New York City.

- Wendy, 40, 5'6", 234 pounds, professional singer and author: A construction company owner who resides in La Canada, California. She is married with a seven-year-old stepdaughter and wants to return to the stage as a singer and songwriter, but needs to lose weight first. Wendy had four top 40 hits in Europe in the nineties.

Wendy was injured in week one with bone spurs and chronic Plantar Fasciitis, which forced her to leave the march during Stage 3 in Greenwich, Connecticut after walking 205 miles in 5 weeks.

- Chantal, 35, 5'2", 250 pounds, comedian: A student who resides in Brookline, Massachusetts. She dreams of one day owning a pair of slim designer jeans.

She completed Fat March, weighing in at 199 pounds, losing a total of 51 pounds.

- Jami Lyn, 30, 5'9", 236 pounds, military wife: A housewife who resides in Daleville, Alabama. She is the mother of three children and finds it difficult to be so much larger than her husband and the only big person in the family.

Jami Lyn completed Fat March weighing 186 pounds, losing a total of 50 pounds.

- Kimberly, 39, 5'5", 274 pounds, former rap diva: A real estate investor who resides in Duluth, Georgia. She was once known as the rap artist Tempest with a top 20 album in Europe. She was in the group Sweetbox. Her mother and father died four months apart due to weight-related issues when she was 15 years old. Prior to this show, she was a contestant on season 1 of I Want to Work for Diddy, using her nickname, Poprah.

Kimberly quit the march in Stage 1.

- Loralie, 30, 5'3", 233 pounds, wants to have a baby: A marketing resources expert who lives in Milwaukee, Wisconsin. She is married and dreams of starting a big family, but her doctor requires that she lose weight first before becoming pregnant.

Loralie completed Fat March, losing a total of 48 pounds, with a final weight of 185 pounds. Loralie became pregnant after the show and gave birth to her first child, a son, in September 2008.

- Shea, 27, 5'7", 289 pounds, former college softball player: A makeup/special effects artist who resides in Indian Rocks Beach, Florida. She is embarrassed that she is the biggest person in the makeup trailer, and her parents are worried about how her weight is affecting her health.

Shea completed Fat March weighing a total 234 pounds, losing a total of 55 pounds.

- Anthony, 26, 6'3", 410 pounds: He is unemployed and resides in Addison, Illinois. He is determined not to let being overweight kill him. He is billed on-screen as a "26-year-old virgin."

He was voted off after Stage 5.

- Matt, 36, 6'4", 386 pounds: He resides in Cincinnati, Ohio and is married with two children. He was released from the WWE the year prior when officials felt he was too heavy and it was not safe for him to compete. He must lose weight to return to his career.

Matt left the march in Pennsylvania during Stage 5 due to a bad knee.

- Michael, 41, 6' 2½", 330 pounds: A lab technician who resides in Elwood, Illinois. He is married with two children and says he has tried every diet "from A to Z."

Michael completed Fat March, weighing in at 239, losing a total of 91 pounds.

- Sam, 22, 5'9", 371 pounds: A certified massage therapist who lives in Everett, Massachusetts, is single, and believes that his weight has kept him from being hired for work. He wrestles in independent wrestling promotions as "Ma'kua".

Sam completed Fat March, losing a total 74 pounds, with a final weight of 297 pounds.

- Shane, 34, 6'0", 519 pounds: A youth minister who lives in Mesquite, Texas. He is married with a two-year-old child and another due in October, and wants to be around to watch them grow up.

Shane left the march in Stage 1 due to stress fractures in both feet.

- Will, 26, 6'2", 470 pounds: A retail clerk who resides in Brooklyn, New York. He eats competitively, is single with no children and would like to inspire others to lose weight and get in shape.

Voted out after Stage 4.

== Episodes ==
Episode 1, which followed the contestants up to eight days and 65 miles, aired on August 6, 2007.
Episode 2, which followed the contestants up to three weeks and 150 miles, aired on August 13, 2007.
Episode 3, which followed the contestants up to five weeks and 205 miles, aired on August 20, 2007.
Episode 4, which followed the contestants up to an unspecified number of weeks and 330 miles, aired on August 27, 2007.
Episode 5, which followed the contestants up to eight weeks and 450 miles, aired on September 3, 2007.
Episode 6, which followed the contestants up to 10 weeks and 575 miles, aired on September 10, 2007.

== Weigh ins ==
Contestant	Age	Ht	Start Wt	Stage 1	Stage 2	Stage 3	Stage 4	Stage 5	Stage 6	lbs lost
Chantal	35	5'2"	250	246	236	228	221	213	199	51
Jami Lyn	30	5'9"	236	231	218	209	202	198	186	50
Loralie	30	5'3"	233	228	222	213	206	197	185	48
Michael	41	6'2"	330	315	286	273	258	252	239	91
Sam	22	5'9"	371	355	351	336	323	314	297	74
Shea	27	5'7"	289	280	272	265	255	244	234	55
Anthony	26	6'3"	410	400	396	378	367	355		55
Matt	36	6'4"	389	383	355	354	336			53
Will	26	6'2"	470	451	441	424	413			57
Wendy	40	5'6"	234	219	215					19
Shane	34	6'0"	519							–
Kimberly	39	5'5"	274							–

Voted Out
Quit
Left due to medical reasons – Shane had stress fractures in both feet, Matt had a bad knee, and Wendy had Plantar Fasciitis.

== Pounds lost per stage ==
Contestant	Stage 1	Stage 2	Stage 3	Stage 4	Stage 5	Stage 6	Total
Chantal	4	10	8	7	8	14	51
Jami Lyn	5	13	9	7	4	12	50
Loralie	5	6	9	7	9	12	48
Michael	15	29	13	15	6	13	91
Sam	16	4	15	13	9	17	74
Shea	9	8	7	10	11	10	55
Anthony	10	4	18	11	12		55
Matt	6	28	1	18			53
Will	19	10	17	11			57
Wendy	15	4					19
Shane							
Kimberly							

== Reception ==
Fat March received mixed reactions from fitness experts. Cardiologist James Rippe called the show "dangerous for lots of reasons" and said that it "sends a message that walking is painful, you get blisters, you get hurt and it's humiliating. They've made a spectacle of people who did this with all good intentions."
