= Lance Cade and Trevor Murdoch =

Professional wrestling tag team

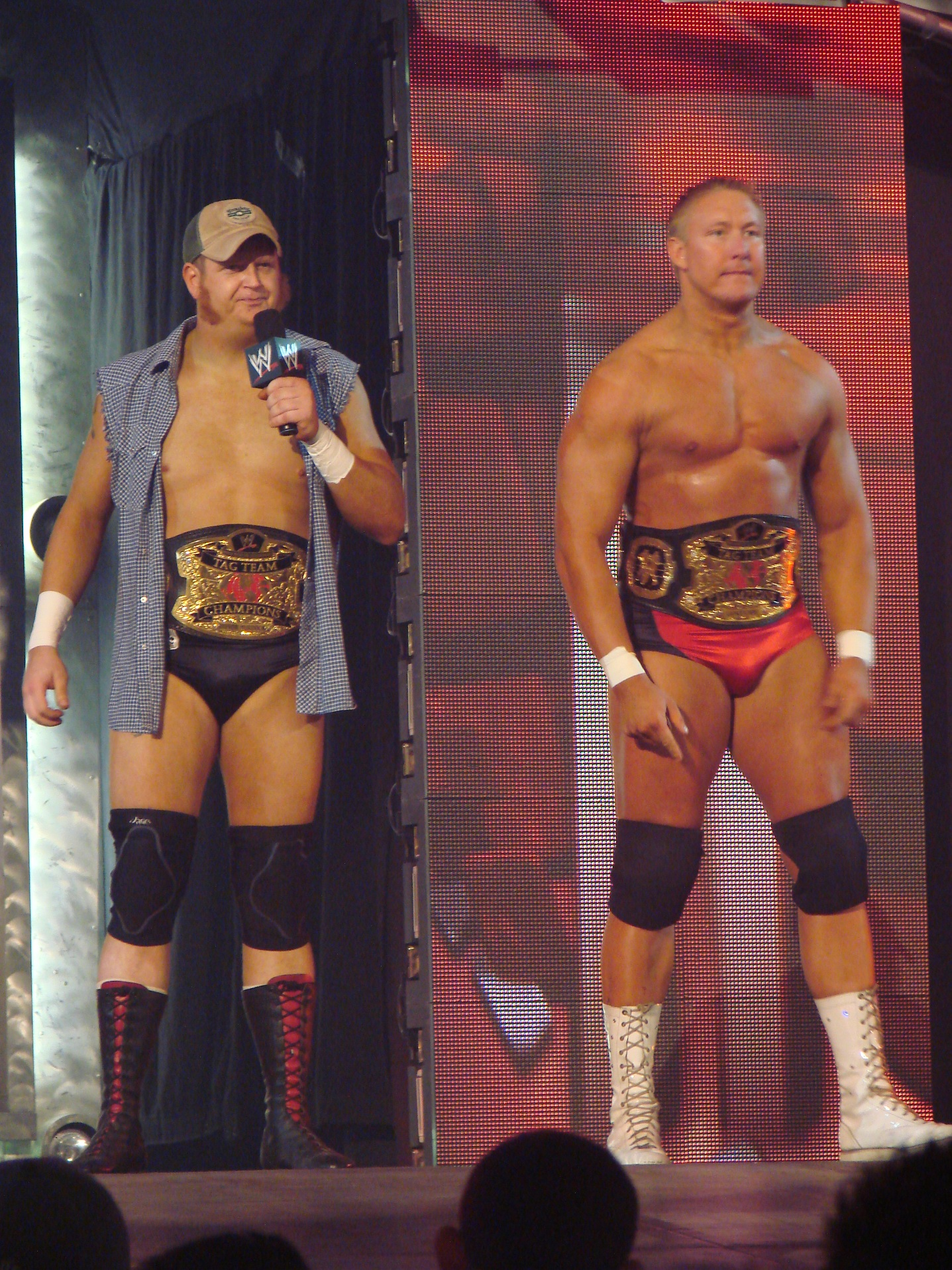
- Lance Cade (right) and Trevor Murdoch in 2007 as World Tag Team Champions

Tag team
- Members: Lance Cade; Trevor Murdoch
- Name(s): Lance Cade and Trevor Murdoch; TNT
- Billed heights: Cade: 6 ft 5 in (1.96 m); Murdoch: 6 ft 4 in (1.93 m)
- Combined billed weight: 486 lb (220 kg)
- Billed from: Texas
- Debut: July 2005
- Disbanded: August 2, 2009
- Years active: 2005–2009

Lance Cade and Trevor Murdoch were an American professional wrestling tag team most famous for the time they spent performing for World Wrestling Entertainment's Raw brand. The team debuted on the September 5, 2005 episode of Raw and in their time together held the World Tag Team Championship on three occasions. The team was briefly broken up in 2006, but was later reunited. During the 2008 WWE Draft, Murdoch was moved to the SmackDown brand, separating the two. Shortly after being drafted, he was released from the company. Later the same year, Cade was released as well, and the team reunited again on the independent circuit. On August 13, 2010, Cade died from heart failure at the age of 29.

== Career ==
=== World Wrestling Entertainment (2005–2008) ===
==== Formation ====
In August 2005, both Lance Cade and Trevor Murdoch were promoted from World Wrestling Entertainment's developmental territory, Ohio Valley Wrestling, to the main Raw roster and wrestled dark matches under the team name "TNT".

On the August 22, 2005 episode of Raw, a vignette was shown showcasing the new tag team of "Lance Cade and Trevor Murdoch". The men were shown in a bar setting, portraying redneck characters; Cade a smooth-talking cowboy, and Murdoch an angry, Southern trucker.^{view} They defeated the reigning World Tag Team Champions, the Hurricane and Rosey, in a non-title match in their televised in-ring debut on the September 5, 2005 episode of Raw, making them the number one contenders for the championship. They took the championship for the first time at the Unforgiven pay-per-view after Murdoch delivered an elevated DDT to the Hurricane outside of the ring causing him to suffer a kayfabe stinger. They held the title for six weeks, when they dropped them to Big Show and Kane at November's Taboo Tuesday event.

==== Split ====
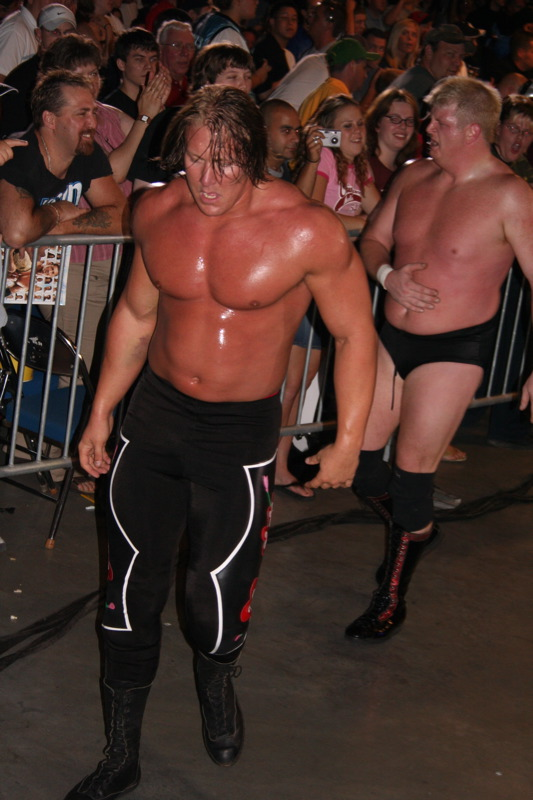
Lance Cade (left) and Trevor Murdoch

Cade and Murdoch wrestled their final match as a tag team on the November 13, (aired November 18) 2005 Eddie Guerrero tribute show, where they lost an "inter-promotional" match against SmackDown!'s Legion of Doom (Road Warrior Animal and Heidenreich). Two weeks later, on the November 28 Raw, Joey Styles announced that they were no longer a team. In a segment of Unlimited, Raw's online commercial-filling segment, Murdoch explained that he had shifted focus to the Intercontinental Championship.

After the split, Murdoch received a small push and became the Unlimited "movie critic", ^{view} while Cade debuted a new "Refined Southern Gentleman" gimmick. Although the team had split up, they were still shown to be "allies" and were often seen together during backstage segments. Separately, they were often put into singles matches with members of other tag teams, and even though they were no longer together they would aid each other in their matches. They were also put into a feud with the team of Goldust and Gene Snitsky.

==== Reunited ====
On the April 14, 2006 episode of Heat, Cade and Murdoch were once again announced as a tag team. They wrestled together again for the first time on the May 19 Heat in a win over Charlie Haas and Viscera.^{view} During the next few months, the team was given a number of wins on Heat and appeared on Unlimited to cut promos stating their intentions to win back the World Tag Team Championship. Later in the year, the two began appearing as "hired guns" for various superstars, including The McMahons (Vince and Shane) and Edge, mostly against D-Generation X (Triple H and Shawn Michaels).

During the April 2, 2007 episode of Raw, Cade and Murdoch were put into a tag team battle royal for the World Tag Team Championship, which eventually went to the Hardys (Matt and Jeff). After the loss the two teams began a feud over the title, with the Hardys retaining at the Backlash, after which Cade and Murdoch started a gimmick of being supreme sportsmen. They lavished the Hardys with compliments, calling them the "better men," when they performed guest commentary during their matches and started wrestling in an overly clean fashion. They also began showing respect to all opponents; shaking hands before and after matches, when before they wouldn't have bothered, though commentators doubted their sincerity. On the June 4 Raw they took the Championship from the Hardy's. The title change featured a measure of storyline controversy, as during the pin Jeff Hardy's foot was on the bottom rope—which should have caused a rope break, but Murdoch pushed it off before the referee saw it, allowing the pin to continue. After the match, when the Hardys confronted Cade and Murdoch about it, both men pleaded ignorance before attacking the Hardys.

After becoming champions again they were put into a feud with Cryme Tyme (JTG and Shad Gaspard) involving Cryme Tyme stealing their belongings and auctioning them to the crowd, but the storyline ended abruptly when Cryme Tyme was released from the company. Instead the sportsman gimmick was revived for a feud with Paul London and Brian Kendrick, who took the World Tag Team Championship at a house show on September 5, 2007 in South Africa, only to drop them right back to Cade and Murdoch on September 8. They remained champions until the December 10 episode of Raw, when Hardcore Holly and Cody Rhodes took the title. In April 2008, Cade began expressing frustration after a series of losses. Following a loss on the April 28 Raw, Murdoch sang a rendition of "Friends in Low Places". The next week he sang in a backstage vignette, and after a victory on May 12 sang the chorus of "The Gambler" at Cade's behest, only to have Cade strike him and break up the team. The two faced off on June 2, with Cade getting the victory. In the 2008 WWE Draft Murdoch was moved to the SmackDown brand, though he was released in July of that year, while Cade continued to wrestle on Raw until he was released from his WWE contract on October 14, 2008.

=== Independent circuit (2008–2009) ===
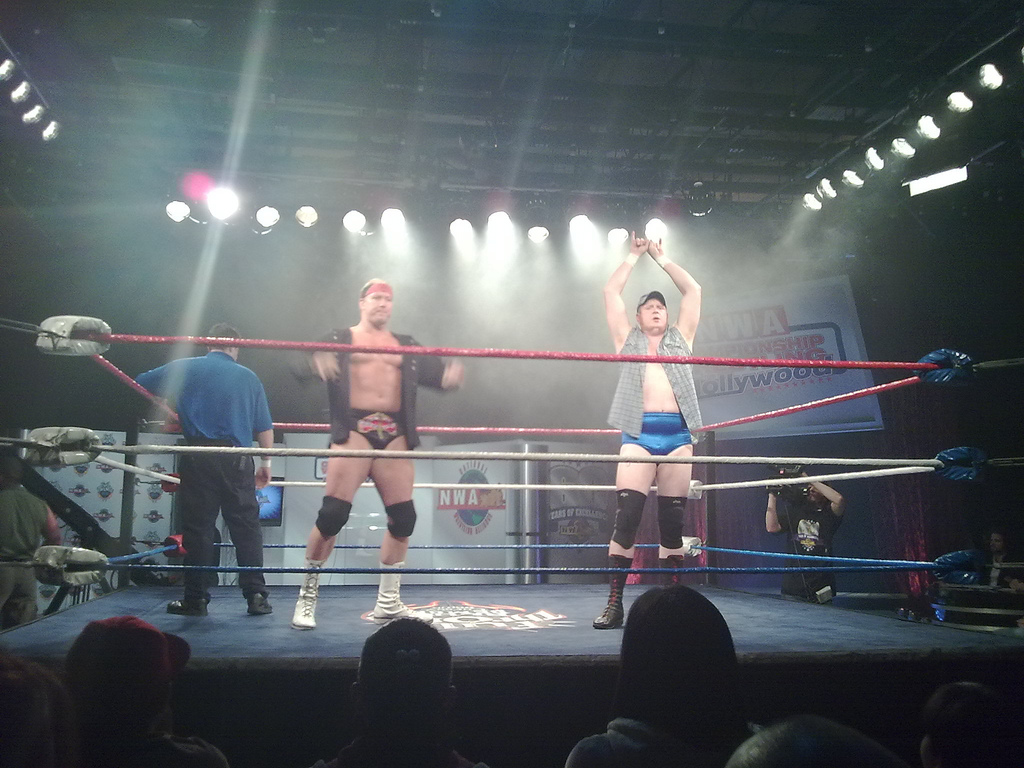
Cade (left) and Murdoch (right) at an NWA Championship Wrestling From Hollywood taping.

Less than a week later, Cade began accepting bookings with Murdoch on the independent circuit, for such promotions as IWA-Mid South.

Cade and Murdoch also began wrestling for National Wrestling Alliance. On November 14, 2008, at NWA Championship Wrestling From Hollywood taping, Cade and Murdoch made their promotional debut defeating Los Luchas (Phoenix Star and Zokre) in a NWA World Tag Team Championship #1 Contendership Robin Tournament. On the February 13, 2009, episode of NWA Wrestling Showcase, Cade and Murdoch defeated the team of Liger Rivera and Tito Aquino. They would make another appearance on the April 3, episode defeating the team of Scott Lost and Tristan Gallo.

Their last match together was on August 2, 2009 in Japan for the Team Vader Vader time 4- Big Van Summer tour defeating Takao Omori and Aaron Neil.

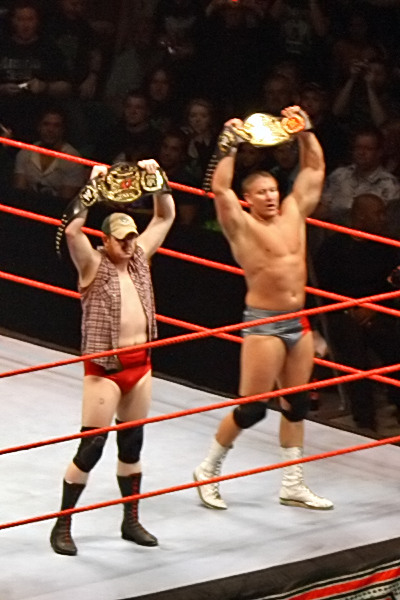
Murdoch (left) and Cade as the World Tag Team Champions.

== Championships and accomplishments ==
- World Wrestling Entertainment
  - World Tag Team Championship (3 times)
