= Stacy Keibler =

American professional wrestler, dancer, and model (born 1979)

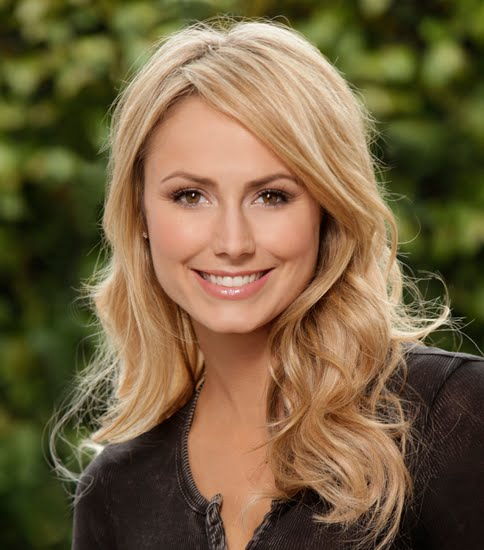
- Keibler in 2011

Personal information
- Born: Stacy Ann-Marie Keibler; October 14, 1979 (age 47) Rosedale, Maryland, U.S.
- Education: Towson University
- Spouse: Jared Pobre (m. 2014)
- Children: 3

Professional wrestling career
- Ring name(s): Miss Hancock; Skye; Stacy Keibler; Super Stacy
- Billed height: 5 ft 11 in (1.80 m)
- Billed weight: 136 lb (62 kg)
- Billed from: Baltimore, Maryland
- Trained by: WCW Power Plant
- Debut: 1999
- Retired: 2006

Stacy Ann-Marie Keibler (born October 14, 1979) is an American retired professional wrestler, entertainer, and model. She is best known for her tenures in World Championship Wrestling (WCW) and World Wrestling Entertainment (WWE).

Keibler began her professional wrestling career as a part of The Nitro Girls in WCW. She quickly moved on to a more prominent role in the company as the manager Miss Hancock. As Miss Hancock, Keibler was known for doing table dances, her relationship with David Flair, and a pregnancy angle. After WCW was purchased by the WWF (later WWE) in 2001, Keibler moved to the new company during the Attitude Era, using her real name and taking part in the Invasion storyline, also managing the Dudley Boyz. Keibler also managed Test and Scott Steiner. Before her departure from WWE in 2006, she was affiliated with The Hurricane and Rosey and nicknamed "Super Stacy".

Keibler was a contestant on Dancing with the Stars: season two in 2006, where she placed third. She has also appeared on other ABC series such as What About Brian, George Lopez, and October Road, as well as the 100th episode of the CBS sitcom How I Met Your Mother as a bartender and on the USA Network show Psych. Keibler has also modeled, appearing in both Maxim and Stuff magazines.

Keibler is considered to be a sex symbol and is known for her unusually long legs. She has been known as both "The Legs of WCW" and "The Legs of WWE". During Keibler's time on Dancing with the Stars, judge Bruno Tonioli nicknamed her "The Weapon of Mass Seduction". Stacy Keibler was inducted into the WWE Hall of Fame on March 27, 2023.

== Early life ==
Stacy Ann-Marie Keibler was born on October 14, 1979, in Rosedale, Maryland, the daughter of Patricia and Gary Keibler. Beginning at the age of three, Keibler took ballet, jazz, and tap dancing classes at Jean Kettell Studio of Dance in Dundalk, Maryland. She went to St. Clement Mary Hofbauer School in Rosedale for her early schooling.

In 1990, Keibler won the title of Miss Maryland Pre-Teen, after competing for the title in Timonium, and went on to win the National Miss Pre-Teen Crown. After attending the Catholic High School of Baltimore, an all-girls school, she attended Towson University, where she studied mass communication. She attended the university on a partial scholarship and had a 3.7 grade point average (GPA). Keibler had minor parts in movies such as Pecker (1998) and Liberty Heights (1999), as well as small modeling jobs. Keibler became a cheerleader for the Baltimore Ravens football team when she was 18.

== Professional wrestling career ==
=== World Championship Wrestling (1999–2001) ===
Keibler began watching wrestling with her boyfriend at the time, Kris Cumberland. She can be seen in the crowd on an episode of Nitro in 1997 and the Starrcade 1998 pay-per-view before the television title match, dancing in an NWO Wolfpac T-shirt.

In September 1999, Keibler entered a nationwide contest that was held by World Championship Wrestling to find a new member of the Nitro Girls dance troupe, which was organized in an attempt to boost the show's declining ratings. A total of 300 women participated in the contest; the results were decided by a series of polls on WCW's website, which narrowed down the field to eight finalists. Keibler was declared the winner of the contest on the November 8, 1999 edition of Nitro after receiving the most online votes out of the eight finalists, and she was given a spot on the dance troupe, along with a $10,000 prize. Her winning routine was watched by 4.4 million viewers. Keibler performed dance routines every week on WCW's flagship show Monday Nitro under the name Skye. By 2000, Keibler was appearing on WCW as a Nitro Girl, attending school full-time, and cheering for the Baltimore Ravens.

She then gained a bigger role and became a heel valet with the new name of Ms. Hancock. Her first role under this name was briefly serving as an associate for the tag team of Lenny Lane and Lodi dubbed Standards and Practices. Despite wearing business suits, her character was known to climb on top of the announcers' table and dance sensually. It was also during this period that she began using what would become her trademark ring entrance: slowly putting her forty-two inch legs through the second tier of ropes, pausing to let the crowd momentarily see her panties underneath her incredibly short skirts. At 5 feet 11 inches, Keibler was one of the tallest women on WWE's roster between 2001 and 2006.

During 2000, she dated David Flair (both on-screen and off-screen), who was already involved in an on-screen relationship with Daffney. Ms. Hancock set her eyes on Flair and ended up stealing him away from Daffney and continued to torment the woman whose boyfriend she stole, and the two would feud throughout the Summer of 2000. This led to Hancock's in-ring debut at the Bash at the Beach in a Wedding Gown match, which she lost after she removed her own gown. Hancock next briefly feuded with Kimberly Page, but the storyline ended abruptly when Page quit the company. Hancock and Flair then began a feud with the Misfits in Action stable, including a mud wrestling singles match against Major Gunns at New Blood Rising. During the match, she was kicked in the stomach, and she revealed herself to be pregnant the next night, beginning a new angle for herself and Flair. Two proposed endings to the storyline were for either Ric Flair or Vince Russo to be the father of her child. The angle, however, ended prematurely, as she revealed the pregnancy to be false, broke up with David Flair, and was taken off of television.

When she returned in 2001, she dropped the name Ms. Hancock and went by her real name Stacy Keibler. On the March 12, 2001 edition of Nitro, Keibler revealed Shawn Stasiak as her "baby" and continued her role as a heel manager, siding with Stasiak. Shawn and Stacy would feud with Bam Bam Bigelow, with the evil Stacy using underhanded tactics to help Stasiak win 2 matches from a series of 3, including on the final edition of Nitro two weeks later on March 26.

=== World Wrestling Federation/Entertainment/WWE (2001–2006, 2011–2023) ===
==== The Invasion (2001) ====
When WCW was purchased by the World Wrestling Federation (WWF) in 2001, Keibler's Time Warner contract was bought by the WWF. Stacy made her WWF television debut on the June 14, 2001 episode of SmackDown! when then-face, Shane McMahon brought her to the ring to distract then-heel, Rhyno, causing him to lose a match. Not long after this she turned into a heel character as part of The Alliance. Stacy showed herself to be an evil mean girl that had a sadistic side, as she loved watching other people's pain and misfortune, and regularly enjoyed mocking them by pointing and laughing. She originally teamed up with real-life friend, then-heel, Torrie Wilson, and the pair feuded with Trish Stratus and Lita. During this feud the four wrestlers competed in the first-ever tag team Bra and Panties Match at the Invasion pay-per-view, which Trish and Lita won by stripping Stacy and Wilson down to their bra & panties. After this she and Torrie moved on to targeting Jacqueline and were shown backstage enjoying watching Jacqueline cry over the elimination of Shadrick McGee from Tough Enough. Stacy and Torrie then defeated Jacqueline in a handicap match on Raw with help from Ivory. On the Heat before SummerSlam, Stacy along with Torrie and Ivory, brutally attacked Lita backstage by injuring her knee, with the intent of preventing her from competing against them later that night. Stacy also had a brief reunion with Shawn Stasiak, and a short alliance with Tazz, as they battled the likes of Spike Dudley and Tajiri. Stacy found it amusing how short these men were and told Torrie that their height made them lesser men. Torrie had begun dating Tajiri at this time and this caused the evil Stacy to begin an on-screen rivalry with her former friend. The feud started with a couple of mixed tag matches involving the women and included Stacy sneak attacking Torrie backstage on an episode of Raw.

==== Duchess of Dudleyville (2001–2002) ====
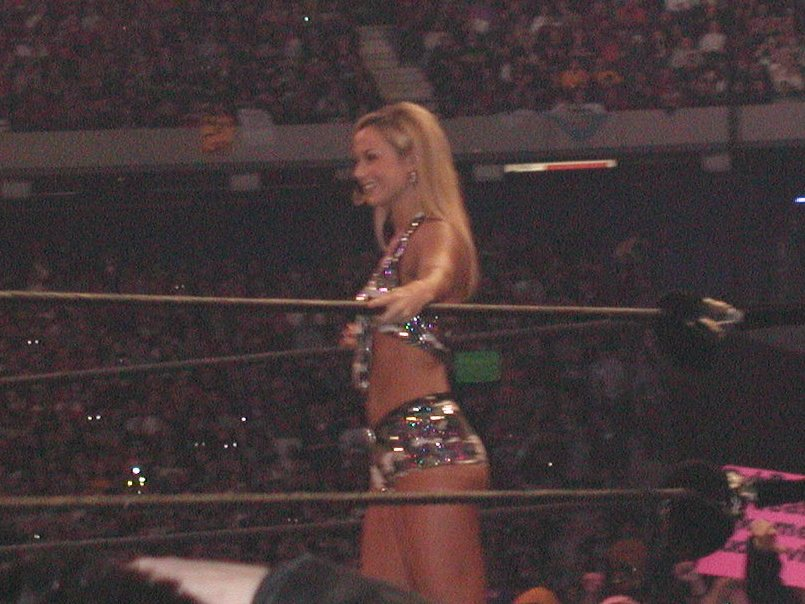
Keibler during WrestleMania X8 in March 2002

As the WCW/ECW Invasion was nearing its end, Keibler became the manager of the heel Dudley Boyz. She made her first appearance in this role on the October 1, 2001 episode of Raw, and was nicknamed the "Duchess of Dudleyville". During this time, Stacy continued to show her sadistic side as she took great pleasure in watching the likes of Torrie Wilson and Spike Dudley get driven violently through tables, and particularly enjoyed being the one to personally give the order to the Dudley Boyz to put Torrie through a table. Stacy couldn't hide her joy at seeing Torrie suffering at her feet and laughed at the sight. A few days later on Smackdown, Stacy watched with glee as the Dudley Boyz threw Spike to the outside of the ring and through a table, as commentator Michael Cole acknowledged how wicked Stacy was and called her “evil”. Torrie would return a couple of weeks later to get her revenge and gave Keibler a wedgie then pantsed her on an episode of SmackDown!. She then defeated Keibler in the first-ever lingerie match, a match wrestled in lingerie, at No Mercy. Keibler made her WrestleMania debut at WrestleMania X8 alongside The Dudleyz. Keibler's role with the Dudley Boyz came to an abrupt end during Raw after WrestleMania when she was powerbombed through a table after accidentally costing the team a match. She then set her sights on the WWE Women's Championship at Judgment Day, facing Trish Stratus in a losing effort. She faced Stratus several more times in the succeeding weeks, but she never won a match against her.

==== Mr McMahon's personal assistant (2002) ====
Keibler was originally drafted to the SmackDown! brand in 2002, where she immediately set her eyes on the man in charge, the heel WWE chairman, Vince McMahon. McMahon was ready to hire another attractive woman until Keibler interrupted and performed a seductive table dance in the ring to successfully become McMahon's personal assistant, as well as his on-screen mistress. She was frequently shown flirting and 'making out' with him in backstage segments. During her time alongside the boss she lied that the young rookie Randy Orton had forced himself on her, which caused Orton to be punished with a match against the mean veteran Hardcore Holly. A few weeks later she sat at ringside and enjoyed watching the rookie Orton get beaten up some more, this time by Test. She also had a personal ringside view when Triple H was ambushed in a 6 on 1 beatdown by some of McMahon's henchmen. The sadistic Stacy looked on and grinned with pleasure as Triple H was beaten and bloodied in the assault. She also continued her rivalry with Torrie Wilson during this time period, and even tried to throw Torrie off the stage on an episode of SmackDown!, but a referee saved Torrie just in time and stopped Stacy's evil plan from being a success. Her time with McMahon came to an end when Stephanie McMahon became general manager of the SmackDown! brand. Dawn Marie made her debut on SmackDown! as McMahon's legal assistant, who competed with Keibler for McMahon's affections.

==== Move to Raw and alliance with Test (2002–2003) ====
A key storyline for Keibler's on-screen character occurred when she left SmackDown! for Raw. Keibler made her official Raw debut on August 12, 2002, and immediately began feuding with the women there. She was given the role of being a special referee on a couple of occasions and used them as opportunities to abuse her power. Stacy liked counting quickly when her fellow bad girls were making pin attempts and counted slowly for the fan favorites. In another role as a special referee, Stacy was put in charge of a match between Test and D'Lo Brown. At the start of the match Stacy slapped D'Lo in the face and hindered his attempts to win the match with slow counts. After D'Lo argued with Stacy about her actions, he was smashed in the face by a big boot from Test, which Stacy thoroughly enjoyed watching. She then made a quick 3 count to help the villain Test win the match. This would begin the on screen pairing between her and Test which would last for the remainder of 2002 and most of 2003. She enjoyed watching him rip apart fan favourites, such as the superhero Hurricane and would also use her deviousness to help him win matches, such as when she delivered a low blow to Goldust.

As Test's on-screen marketing agent, she came up with the idea that Test should call his fans "Testicles," cut his hair, and reshape his image. This caused the gimmick to become popular with the audience and the couple switched from being villains into fan favorites in November 2002. This would be Stacy's first time as a babyface in WWE. In the spring of 2003, Test, however, began verbally abusing Keibler, who also started managing Scott Steiner. After months of build-up, Keibler finally left Test for Steiner on the June 2 edition of Raw. Steiner defeated Test for Keibler's services at Bad Blood, and Keibler seemed happy as Steiner's new manager, as the two alluded to having more than a professional relationship. Test, however, continued to harass Keibler and Steiner until Steiner accepted a rematch with Stacy's services on the line. On the August 18 episode of Raw, Test won the match after faking a leg injury and then blindsiding Steiner with a big boot. A match was then set for Unforgiven with the stipulation that if Test won, he would not only retain Keibler's services, but would acquire Steiner's services as well. During the match, Keibler's interference backfired, and Test won the match. Steiner then turned heel by attacking Keibler after her interference in his match on the September 29 episode of Raw backfired. For a time, Test and Steiner worked as a tag team, sharing the services of Keibler as their on-screen sex slave. The storyline finally ended on the December 1 episode of Raw, when general manager Mick Foley freed Keibler from her obligatory contracts with Test and Steiner by temporarily firing them.

==== Various storylines (2003–2005) ====
Keibler was chosen to record a track on the album WWE Originals. She and WWE music producer Jim Johnston recorded the song "Why Can't We Just Dance?" for the album. She was then placed in a feud involving Torrie Wilson and then-babyface, Sable, both of whom had recently posed for a Playboy cover. Keibler aligned with Miss Jackie, neither of whom had posed for the magazine, claiming that they deserved to be in Playboy over Sable and Wilson. Keibler and Jackie challenged Sable and Wilson to a Tag Team Evening Gown match at WrestleMania XX, which they lost when Jackie was pinned by Wilson, and the feud was dropped afterward. Before the feud was dropped, all the performers were playing face characters at the time.

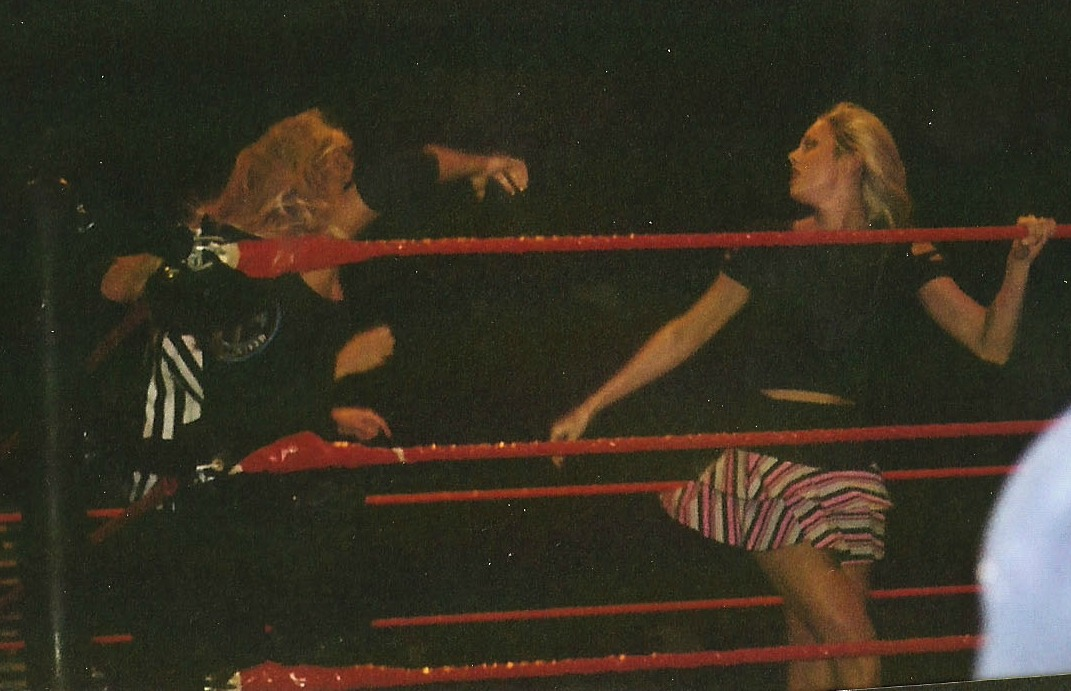
Keibler wrestling Trish Stratus during a house show in October 2004

She took over the 2004 Raw Diva Search for a few weeks, which led to several tag matches against the heel gimmicks of Gail Kim, Trish Stratus, and Molly Holly and with partners Nidia and the face gimmick of Victoria. Keibler got upset victories over Kim, Stratus, and Holly. She earned a Women's Championship title match on October 11, 2004, but she was defeated by Stratus, who retained the title. Keibler also competed in the first-ever Fulfill your Fantasy Diva Battle Royal for the WWE Women's Championship at Taboo Tuesday along with Victoria, Nidia, Gail Kim, Molly Holly, Jazz, and then-champion Stratus. She was eliminated second to last after jumping over the top rope to avoid hitting the turnbuckle, followed by Holly knocking her off the apron to eliminate her.

In February 2005, Keibler began appearing in backstage segments with then-babyface, Randy Orton, and eventually became his on-screen girlfriend. When Orton challenged The Undertaker to a match at WrestleMania 21, Orton ended the relationship by hitting Stacy with an RKO, incapacitating her. He justified it by claiming he was demonstrating how ruthless he could be in order to defeat The Undertaker.

==== Super Stacy (2005–2006) ====
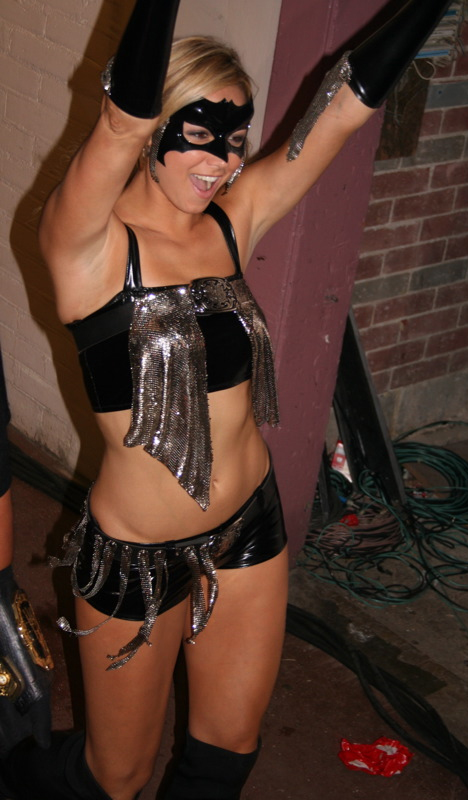
Keibler dressed as "Super Stacy" in 2005

Keibler then joined forces with The Hurricane and Rosey. She became one-third of the trio as a superhero sidekick nicknamed Super Stacy, complete with her own superhero costume. She was ringside during several matches as they defended their World Tag Team Championship. During this time, Keibler feuded on-screen with then-heel, Victoria, including confrontations and a mixed-tag-team match on Raw and a singles match on Heat.

After a long tenure on Monday nights, Keibler and Christy Hemme, were moved to SmackDown! on August 25, as part of a trade that brought Torrie Wilson and Candice Michelle to Raw. On SmackDown! Keibler participated in lingerie matches and bikini contests. After a short absence, Keibler began a short feud with Jillian Hall, which led to the two having a match on Velocity, which Keibler lost. This would be Keibler's final match with WWE. Keibler then asked for time off to appear on Dancing with the Stars. During this time, Keibler's WWE.com profile was moved from SmackDown! to RAW, though she never made an appearance on the brand before leaving the company. Keibler's final mention on WWE programming occurred on the March 6, 2006 episode of RAW, where she was insulted by Candice Michelle for placing third on Dancing with the Stars during Michelle's unveiling of her Playboy magazine cover. After completing her stint on Dancing with the Stars, Keibler officially parted ways with WWE in July 2006 to move on to other endeavors.

==== Sporadic appearances and Hall of Fame induction (2011, 2019, 2023) ====
After leaving WWE in July 2006, Keibler made a special guest appearance for WWE's reality show, Tough Enough in 2011. Being a former NFL Cheerleader, she helped prepare the contestants to perform publicly in Universal Studios.

On April 6, 2019, Keibler made a surprise return to induct Torrie Wilson into the WWE Hall of Fame. In 2021, WWE Network listed Keibler as one of the women who made an impact in WWE outside the ring. On March 15, 2023, Keibler was reported to be entering the WWE Hall of Fame, being confirmed on March 27, 2023. She was inducted by both Mick Foley and Torrie Wilson at the official ceremony ahead of WrestleMania 39, appearing with fellow inductees on-stage during the second night of the event.

== Modeling and acting career ==
As fitness editor at Stuff magazine from 2005 to 2006, Keibler wrote and modeled for her own occasional column, "Getting Fit with Stacy Keibler". She has appeared on the cover of that magazine twice -June 2005 and March 2006. Maxim named Keibler No. 5 in its 2006 Hot 100 issue, and No. 70 in its 2007 Hot 100. In 2008, she was named No. 89 in Maxim's annual Hot 100 list.; the following year she was No. 77. In 2010, she was No. 82 and in 2011 she was No. 72. And in 2012 she was ranked 51. Keibler has declined two invitations from Playboy to pose in the nude for its magazine.

Keibler starred in a commercial for AT&T Corporation alongside Carrot Top. She also auditioned and earned a role in Big Momma's House 2, but she did not appear.

She competed in the second season of Dancing with the Stars, alongside her dance partner, Tony Dovolani. Keibler received a perfect score of 30 from the three judges for her samba dance routine in week five. This prompted judge, Bruno Tonioli, to nickname her a "weapon of mass seduction." Overall, Keibler and Dovolani received four perfect scores. Keibler was eliminated in the final episode, coming in third to Jerry Rice, who placed second in the final round of the competition, and Drew Lachey, the winner of the season. Two of the judges, Bruno Tonioli and Len Goodman, felt she should have at least placed second. Oddsmakers had considered her the favorite to win the competition.

Keibler has appeared on MTV's Punk'd twice. In season five, Keibler took part in helping prank Triple H, which also included Stephanie McMahon. In season seven, however, Keibler was seen as a victim of a prank by her then-boyfriend, Geoff Stults.

In February 2007, Keibler began a recurring role in ABC's What About Brian. She played the role of Brian's new neighbor and love interest. This was Keibler's first major acting role, following her previous minor roles in both Bubble Boy and Pecker. Keibler guest starred on George Lopez on ABC. In the fall of 2007, Keibler appeared both in The Comebacks and on ABC's drama October Road.

In April 2008, she was named No. 64 in FHM's annual 100 Sexiest Women list. Keibler was featured in an advertisement in the 2008 Sports Illustrated Swimsuit issue. In September 2008, Keibler appeared on ABC Family's mini television series, Samurai Girl as the heel character Karen. On November 23, 2008, Keibler was named the "World's Hottest Athlete" by a sixty-four contestant bracket on InGameNow.

Keibler hosted the E! Special Maxim's Celebrity Beach Watch: 15 Hottest Bodies on September 16, 2009, and The Ultimate Spike Girl 2009 Finale on Spike TV on October 1, 2009. On January 11, 2010, Keibler appeared as "the hot bartender", a new conquest for Barney, in the How I Met Your Mother 100th episode, "Girls Versus Suits". On February 3, 2010, Keibler appeared on an episode of the USA Network show Psych. On Oct. 4, 2010, Keibler made a guest appearance in the spy comedy Chuck season 4, episode 3 titled "Chuck versus the Cubic Z" alongside guests Nicole Richie and fellow WWE alum "Stone Cold" Steve Austin. Keibler played the role of CIA agent "Greta".

In 2011, Keibler hosted Call of Duty Elite's Friday Night Fights. In 2013, Keibler hosted a Lifetime show called Supermarket Superstar, where home chefs fought for their product to be sold in supermarkets. In 2014, she reprised her role as Karina in the episode "Slapsgiving 3: Slappointment in Slapmarra" of How I Met Your Mother.

== Other media ==
Keibler made her video game debut in WCW Backstage Assault (2000) as her Miss Hancock character. She would later appear in thirteen WWE console games, which include: WWE WrestleMania X8, WWE SmackDown! Shut Your Mouth (both 2002), WWE Crush Hour, WWE WrestleMania XIX, WWE Raw 2, WWE SmackDown! Here Comes the Pain (all four 2003), WWE Day of Reckoning, WWE SmackDown! vs. Raw (both 2004), WWE WrestleMania 21, WWE Day of Reckoning 2, WWE SmackDown! vs. Raw 2006 (all three 2005), WWE 2K22 (2022; as downloadable content), WWE 2K23 (2023), WWE 2K24 (2024), WWE 2K25 (2025), and WWE 2K26 (2026). Keibler also appears in Dancing with the Stars (2007), a game based on the ABC series of the same name, and the WWE SuperCard (2014) and WWE Champions mobile games.

== Filmography ==
Year	Title	Role	Notes
1998	Pecker	Blonde on Bus	Uncredited
1999	Liberty Heights	Extra	Uncredited
2001	Bubble Boy	Working Girl	Cameo
2002; 2011	WWE Tough Enough	Herself	3 episodes
2004	Headbangers Ball	Herself	1 episode
2005–2006	Punk'd	Herself	2 episodes
2006	Dancing with the Stars	Herself	Placed third in season 2
2007	George Lopez	Lindsay Cafferty	2 episodes
2007	What About Brian	Stephanie	5 episodes
2007	The Comebacks	All-American Mom	
2008	October Road	Rory Dunlop	Episode: "The Fine Art of Surfacing"
2008	Samurai Girl	Karen	2 episodes
2009	In the Motherhood	Keli Lee	Episode: "It Takes a Village Idiot"
2009	Mayne Street	Herself	Episode: "Sports Guy Mansion"
2010; 2014	How I Met Your Mother	Karina	2 episodes
2010–2011	Chuck	Greta/Captain Victoria Dunwoody	2 episodes
2011	Psych	Jessica Martino	Episode: "Thrill Seekers and Hell Raisers"
2011	Blue Mountain State	Thad's Wife	Episode: "Vision Quest"
2011	Fixing Pete	Mandy	Television movie
2012	Dysfunctional Friends	Storm	
2012	Men at Work	Keri	Episode: "Devil's Threesome"
2012	NTSF:SD:SUV::	Hours	Episode: "Time Angels"
2013	Fashion Police	Herself	June 13 episode
2013	The View	Herself/Guest Co-Hostess	July 18 episode
2013	Supermarket Superstar	Herself/host	10 episodes
2013	Hollywood Game Night	Herself	Episode: "Purr-ty People"
2013	Project Runway	Herself/Guest Judge	Episode: "Let's Do Brunch"

=== Video games ===
Year	Title	Notes
2000	WCW Backstage Assault	First video game appearance. Appears as Miss Hancock.
2002	WWE WrestleMania X8	First WWE video game appearance.
2002	WWE SmackDown! Shut Your Mouth	
2003	WWE Crush Hour	
2003	WWE WrestleMania XIX	
2003	WWE Raw 2	
2003	WWE SmackDown! Here Comes the Pain	
2004	WWE Day of Reckoning	
2004	WWE SmackDown! vs. Raw	
2005	WWE WrestleMania 21	
2005	WWE Day of Reckoning 2	Cover athlete.
2005	WWE SmackDown! vs. Raw 2006	
2007	Dancing with the Stars	Based on the show of the same name.
2020	WWE SuperCard	Introduced in Season 7.
2021	WWE Champions	Introduced in 2021.
2022	WWE 2K22	DLC (Downloadable content)
2023	WWE 2K23	Unlock-able wrestler through in-game currency
2024	WWE 2K24	Unlock-able wrestler through in-game currency
2025	WWE 2K25	Unlock-able wrestler through in-game currency
2026	WWE 2K26	Playable wrestler; playable general manager in MyGM mode

=== Dancing with the Stars season 2 performances ===
Week #	Dance / Song	Judges' scores			Result
Week #	Dance / Song	Inaba	Goodman	Tonioli	Result
1	Waltz / "I Wonder Why"	8	6	8	Safe
2	Rumba / "I'm Like a Bird"	9	10	10	Safe
3	Tango / "Cell Block Tango"	9	9	9	Safe
4	Foxtrot / "Cold, Cold Heart"	8	9	9	Safe
5	Samba / "Bootylicious"	10	10	10	Safe
5	Group Salsa / "Rhythm is Gonna Get You"	No scores given			Safe
6	Jive / "Wake Me Up Before You Go-Go"	10	10	10	Safe
6	Group Viennese Waltz / "Fallin'"	No scores given			Safe
7 Semi-finals	Quickstep / "You Can't Hurry Love"	9	9	9	Safe
7 Semi-finals	Cha-Cha-Cha / "Since U Been Gone"	9	9	10	Safe
8 Finals	Jive / "Wake Me Up Before You Go-Go"	10	10	10	Third place
8 Finals	Freestyle / "Staylin' Alive"	8	9	9	Third place
8 Finals	Samba / "Livin' la Vida Loca"	10	10	10	Third place

== Personal life ==
Keibler's boyfriend of five years from 1994 to 1999, Kris Cumberland, was a wrestling fan who first got her interested in wrestling, and they would sometimes go to WCW and WWF events within two hours' drive of Baltimore. In 2000, after winning $10,000 in the contest to become a part of The Nitro Girls, Keibler used the money to buy season tickets for the Baltimore Ravens, the team for which she cheers and was a former cheerleader. In 2000, Keibler dated David Flair during their time together in WCW.

From 2001 to 2005, Keibler dated Test while they both worked together in the WWF/WWE. Keibler moved to Los Angeles in 2004, where she was roommates with Torrie Wilson. In June 2005, Keibler was reported to be in a relationship with actor Geoff Stults. The pair appeared together on MTV's Punk'd, with Keibler as the recipient of the prank. Keibler and Stults were part-owners of the now defunct Hollywood Fame, a 2006 expansion franchise of the American Basketball Association (ABA). The team went defunct after only one season. Stults and Keibler split in 2010. In 2006, Keibler suffered a sezuire. She had a tonic clonic sezuire. She was hospitalised but was later sent home.

Keibler dated actor George Clooney from 2011 to 2013.

Keibler began dating Future Ads CEO Jared Pobre in fall 2013, though they had been friends for several years previously. They were married on March 8, 2014, in Mexico. They have two daughters and a son.

== Championships and accomplishments ==
- World Championship Wrestling
  - Nitro Girl Search (1999)
- World Wrestling Entertainment / WWE
  - WWE Babe of the Year (2004)
  - WWE Hall of Fame (Class of 2023)
