= Stinger (medicine) =

Neurological injury sustained by athletes

In medicine, a stinger, also called a burner or nerve pinch injury, is a neurological injury suffered by athletes, mostly in high-contact sports such as ice hockey, rugby, American and Canadian football, wrestling, weightlifting, cheerleading and gymnastics. The spine injury is characterized by a shooting or stinging pain that travels down one arm, followed by numbness and weakness in the parts of the arms, including the biceps, deltoid, and spinati muscles. Many athletes in contact sports have suffered stingers, but they are often unreported to medical professionals.

Anyone who experiences significant trauma to their head or neck needs immediate medical evaluation for the possibility of a spinal injury. In fact, it is safest to assume that trauma victims have a spinal injury until proven otherwise because:

- The time between injury and treatment can be critical in determining the extent of complications and the amount of recovery
- A serious spinal injury is not always immediately obvious. If it is not recognized, more severe injury may occur
- Numbness or paralysis may develop immediately or come on gradually as bleeding or swelling occurs in or around the spinal cord

== Mechanism ==
The three main mechanisms of a stinger include receiving direct blows, extension, and compression of the brachial plexus, with most of the brachial plexus injuries being an extension-compression mechanism.

A stinger is an injury that is caused by restriction of the nerve supply to the upper extremity via the brachial plexus. The brachial plexus is formed by the anterior rami of the nerves at the 5th cervical level of the spinal cord all the way to the nerves at the 1st thoracic level of the spinal cord. The brachial plexus innervates the upper extremity as well as some muscles in the neck and shoulder. Damage to the brachial plexus can occur when the nerves are stretched too far from the head and neck; specifically the upper trunk of the plexus – nerve roots at the 5th and 6th cervical level – are primarily affected. The upper trunk provides part of the nerve to supply to the upper extremity via the Musculocutaneous, Axillary, Radial and Median nerves. It is for this reason that stingers do not affect both arms simultaneously, however it is possible for both arms to accrue injuries. Repeated nerve trauma can cause recurring stingers, chronic pain, and muscle weakness, while recovery can take weeks to months in severe cases.

Since stingers are a nerve injury, a stinger can fall into two different categories of peripheral nerve injury with physiological differences. Grade I is neurapraxia, which involves focal damage of the myelin fibers around the axon, with the axon and the connective tissue sheath remaining intact. The disruption of nerve function involves demyelination. Axonal integrity is preserved, and remyelination occurs within days or weeks. Grade II is categorized by axonotmesis which is the most severe case of nerve injury in the context of stingers and involves the injury of the axon. Grade III is classified as neurotmesis where there is a complete disruption of the axon, where it is unlikely of recovery. If this is to happen it is not considered a stinger, and usually is a high-energy injury to the shoulder girdle.

== Diagnosis and treatment ==
Stingers are best diagnosed by a medical professional. This person will assess the athlete's pain, range of head and neck motion, arm numbness, and muscle strength. Often, the affected athlete is allowed to return to play within a short time, but persistent symptoms will result in removal. Athletes are also advised to receive regular evaluations until symptoms have ceased, specifically, the restoration of pain-free mobility. If they have not after two weeks, or increase, additional tests such as magnetic resonance imaging (MRI) can be performed to detect a more serious injury, such as a herniated disc.

The order of treatments applied depends on whether the athlete's main complaint is pain or weakness. Both can be treated with an analgesic, anti-inflammatory medication, ice and heat, restriction of movement, and if necessary, cervical collar or traction. Surgery is only necessary in the most severe cases.

== Returning to play ==
Returning from this injury depends on the number of burners that occurs. If a stinger occurs, the athletes usually return to play after they restore full strength, are asymptomatic where no pain persists, and painless range of motion in the cervical spine. At low frequencies of stingers, like 1 or 2, there is a much lower risk of the symptoms reoccurring. If three or more stingers occur in one season, one has a higher increased risk at the symptoms persisting.

If one is returning from play to contact sports it is important to adopt a strict exercise regimen of the neck muscles so the player has the ability to handle the trauma associated with tackles.

== Prevention ==
Stingers can be prevented by several of the following factors, but first, it is crucial to identify the severity of the stinger because treatment usually depends on that factor. If strengthening treatment starts too early with a severe case, it can prevent one from healing. The dysfunctions that caused the peripheral nerve injury must be identified to treat and prevent future injury.

Flexibility and strength of the neck, shoulder, and upper extremity are essential because stiffness and weakness are predisposing factors for a burner as well as consequences of this injury. Factors that could help in the prevention of stingers could include strengthening the muscles, increasing the range of motion, and improving technique when playing.

Simple measures can be taken to help in the recovery from stingers. A chest-out posture should be adapted to prevent the neck from extending too far because it brings the head over the shoulders. The chest-out posture is emphasized due to it not being commonly adopted by athletes due to developed shoulders and is perpetuated by brachial plexus irritation. The chest-out posture also reduces pressure on the brachial plexus by opening the thoracic outlet.

Finally, stingers can be prevented by wearing protective gear, such as butterfly restrictors, designed to protect the head and neck from being forced into unnatural positions. This equipment is more feasible in positions where unrestricted head and neck movement is not required, such as American football lineman, than in positions like quarterback, where such movement is integral. Regardless of equipment, it is important to report even minor symptoms to an athletic trainer or team physician, and to allow appropriate recovery time.

== Epidemiology ==
Stingers commonly occur in contact sports like wrestling, hockey, basketball, boxing, rugby, weightlifting, and, most notably, gridiron(American and Canadian) football. One study found that up to 65% of college football players have suffered at least one stinger. However, it is difficult to ping an exact number of athletes that suffer from stingers as stingers are historically under-reported. This could be due to the players fear of being removed from play or the injury being viewed as unimportant.

The following study found different frequencies in the number of stingers that occur. Incidence of stingers over a six-year study period with only 1.5 stingers per team each season. Most of the stingers reported were either during competitions or preseason. Exactly 93% of stingers were due to player contact, specifically 36.7% occurring while tackling and 25.8% occurring while blocking.

== History ==
In 1976 most major American football leagues banned the technique of spearing in the sport due to the risk of injury. When a player makes head-down contact, that player has much more of a chance of a significant spinal cord injury. After the initial rule change, many of the cervical spine injuries stopped. Therefore, this prompted a new tackling technique to be adopted, such as the head-up tackling technique. This technique does prevent catastrophic spine injuries, but it can result in brachial plexus injuries. After the rule change, it has been estimated that stingers have gone up in prevalence.
