= Royal Rumble (2002) =

World Wrestling Federation pay-per-view event

- Promotional poster featuring a silhouette of The Rock
- Promotion: World Wrestling Federation
- Date: January 20, 2002
- City: Atlanta, Georgia
- Venue: Philips Arena
- Attendance: 16,106
- Buy rate: 670,000
- Tagline: 30 Men, One Match, One W1nner

Pay-per-view chronology
← Previous; Vengeance	Next → No Way Out

Royal Rumble chronology
← Previous; 2001	Next → 2003

The 2002 Royal Rumble was a professional wrestling pay-per-view (PPV) event produced by the World Wrestling Federation (WWF, now WWE). It was the 15th annual Royal Rumble event and took place on January 20, 2002, at the Philips Arena in Atlanta, Georgia. The event was based around the men's Royal Rumble match, a modified 30-man battle royal in which the participants enter at timed intervals instead of all beginning in the ring at the same time and the winner received an Undisputed WWF Championship match at WrestleMania X8.

Six matches were contested at the event. The main event was the 2002 Royal Rumble match, which was won by Triple H, who last eliminated Kurt Angle. In other prominent matches, Chris Jericho defeated The Rock to retain the Undisputed WWF Championship, Ric Flair wrestled his first WWF match in nine years by defeating Vince McMahon in a Street Fight, and William Regal defeated Edge to win the WWF Intercontinental Championship.

This was the final Royal Rumble held before the introduction of the first brand extension in March. It was also the final Royal Rumble produced under the WWF name, as in May, the WWF was renamed to World Wrestling Entertainment (WWE). This would also be the last Royal Rumble to feature one world championship until 2014.

== Production ==
=== Background ===
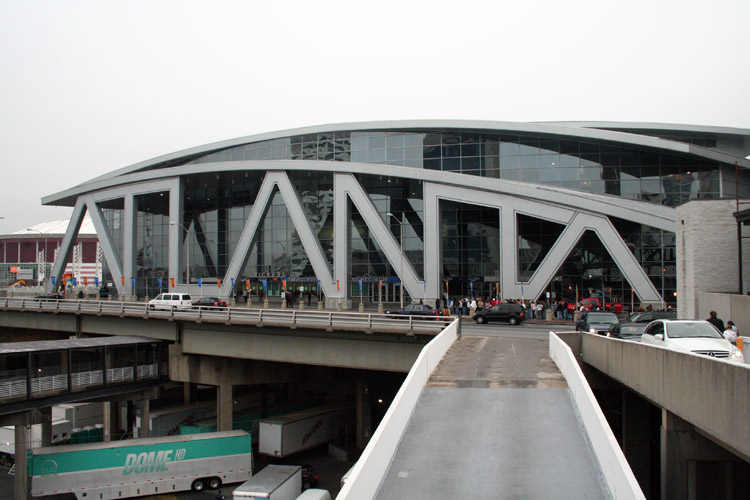
The 15th annual Royal Rumble event was held at the Philips Arena in Atlanta, Georgia.

The Royal Rumble is an annual professional wrestling event, produced every January by the World Wrestling Federation (WWF, now WWE) since 1988; that first event was a television special before it became an annual pay-per-view (PPV) beginning in 1989. It is one of the promotion's original four pay-per-views, along with WrestleMania, SummerSlam, and Survivor Series, referred to as the "Big Four", and was considered one of the "Big Five" PPVs with the addition of King of the Ring in 1993. It is named after and centered on the men's Royal Rumble match. The 15th Royal Rumble event was scheduled to be held on January 20, 2002, at the Philips Arena in Atlanta, Georgia.

The Royal Rumble match is a modified battle royal in which the participants enter at timed intervals instead of all beginning in the ring at the same time, and the match generally features 30 wrestlers. Since 1993, the winner earns a world championship match at that year's WrestleMania. For 2002, the winner earned a match for the Undisputed WWF Championship at WrestleMania X8, following the unification of the WWF Championship and WCW World Heavyweight Championship as the Undisputed WWF Championship at Vengeance in December 2001.

=== Storylines ===
The event comprised six matches that resulted from scripted storylines. Results were predetermined by the WWF's writers, while storylines were produced on the WWF's weekly television shows, Raw and SmackDown.

The main feud was between Chris Jericho and The Rock for Jericho's Undisputed WWF Championship. The feud, which had begun in October 2001 while the two were members of Team WWF during the InVasion and traded the WCW Championship between them, continued at Vengeance, when Jericho defeated both The Rock and the reigning WWF Champion "Stone Cold" Steve Austin to unify the titles. On the following night's episode of Raw, Jericho successfully defended the Undisputed title over "Stone Cold" Steve Austin in a Steel Cage match with help from Booker T. During the following two weeks, Jericho had successfully defended the title against the likes of Rob Van Dam, The Big Show, and Kurt Angle. The Rock earned a match for the Undisputed WWF Championship at the Royal Rumble on the January 3 episode of SmackDown! by defeating Booker T. On the January 10 episode of SmackDown!, The Rock and Rob Van Dam defeated Jericho and Test when The Rock made Jericho submit with the Sharpshooter.

The secondary feud was between the two WWF Co-Owners Ric Flair and Vince McMahon. The feud began on the November 19 episode of Raw, when Flair made his return to the WWF and revealed that he had bought Shane and Stephanie's stock to the WWF, which now meant that he and Vince were co-owners the company. On the December 27 episode of SmackDown!, McMahon came to the ring to share his new year's resolutions when he was interrupted by Flair. Flair reminded Vince how he had tried to hire him to come to the WWF when he was under contract with the NWA back in 1988, until Flair eventually left the NWA (which, at this point, had become WCW) and came to the WWF in 1991, and how he had won the 1992 Royal Rumble match and became WWF Champion. Flair also brought up his main event match with "Macho Man" Randy Savage at WrestleMania VIII. Flair then claimed that he looked through all the contracts one of which he pulled out that said "Vince McMahon - Owner/Wrestler" which meant that Flair could officially book Vince to wrestle at the Royal Rumble. McMahon then asked "who's got the balls" to step into the ring with him, before Flair punched Vince in the mouth and announced that the two of them would face each other at the Royal Rumble. The following week, Flair announced that the match would be a Street Fight, which Vince agreed to. The next four weeks saw Flair and McMahon confronting each other in the build up to their match, including McMahon mocking Flair by putting on a blonde wig and one of Flair's trademark robes, before also assaulting Flair with a lead pipe. During a promo, McMahon stated he "loves destroying lives" and promised to destroy Flair's life at the Royal Rumble.

On the January 7 episode of Raw, buildup towards the Royal Rumble match started, with "Stone Cold" Steve Austin and The Undertaker declaring their entries. Later that night, Triple H officially made his return after missing nearly eight months with a quadriceps injury, and announced that he too would be entering the Royal Rumble match. He was quickly interrupted by Kurt Angle, who then announced his intentions to enter the match, which was to be his first, and mentioned his victory over Triple H at the previous year's Royal Rumble event, when he was the reigning WWF Champion. Triple H then performed a Pedigree on Angle in retaliation. During a match between Austin and Angle on the January 10 episode of SmackDown!, Kane, The Big Show, and Triple H all interfered, leading to a huge brawl. In the end, only Triple H remained standing, until The Undertaker stared him down from the top of the ramp. On the January 14 episode of Raw, Triple H stated that he wants to win the Undisputed WWF Championship. Austin came out, and they fought until The Undertaker came out, and hit Triple H with a chair, allowing Austin to hit him with the Stone Cold Stunner. The Undertaker then hit Austin with the chair. On the January 17 episode of SmackDown!, Austin and Triple H defeated Angle and Booker T. After the match, The Undertaker once again came out, and stared them down.

The feud between Edge and William Regal continued from Vengeance. On the December 10 episode of Raw, Edge mocked Regal, prompting Regal to nail him from behind with brass knuckles. On the December 13 episode of SmackDown!, William Regal and Kurt Angle faced Edge and Rikishi in a tag match. After the match, Edge hit Regal with a steel chair, before giving Regal an Edgecution onto the chair, legitimately breaking his nose. On the January 7 episode of Raw, Regal interfered after Edge's victory over Lance Storm and hit him with brass knuckles. Regal then challenged Edge to a match for the WWF Intercontinental Championship at the Royal Rumble, which Edge accepted. On the January 14 episode of Raw, Edge and Rob Van Dam faced William Regal and Test, where Regal pinned Edge after once again using the brass knuckles. On the January 17 episode of SmackDown!, Regal defeated Rob Van Dam when he used brass knuckles behind the referee's back. Later on that night, Regal came out during Edge's match with Test, but failed to interfere when Edge nailed him and referee Nick Patrick with a chair.

== Event ==
=== Preliminary matches ===
Other on-screen personnel
Role:	Name:
Commentator	Jim Ross
Commentator	Jerry Lawler
Commentator	Carlos Cabrera (Spanish)
Commentator	Hugo Savinovich (Spanish)
Interviewer	Jonathan Coachman
Interviewer	Michael Cole
Interviewer	Lilian Garcia
WWF New York host	Shawn Michaels
Ring announcer	Howard Finkel
Referee	Mike Chioda
Referee	Jack Doan
Referee	Brian Hebner
Referee	Earl Hebner
Referee	Jim Korderas
Referee	Theodore Long
Referee	Nick Patrick
Referee	Charles Robinson
Referee	Tim White

The show opened with a tag team match between Spike Dudley and Tazz, and the Dudley Boyz (Bubba Ray Dudley and D-Von Dudley) for the WWF Tag Team Championship. The Dudley Boyz dominated Spike in the beginning, with Bubba Ray ripping off Spike's neck brace. Spike fought back by performing a Dudley Dog, but failed to capitalize. The Dudley Boyz then double-teamed Spike while the referee was preoccupied with Tazz. Tazz eventually came in, and both dominated. Stacy Keibler, who accompanied the Dudley Boyz to ringside, climbed on the apron, and attempted to distract Tazz. Tazz then locked in the Tazzmission until D-Von broke the hold. Spike then hit the Dudley Dog on Bubba and attempted to do the same on D-Von, but Spike was thrown out of the ring. D-Von then ran at Tazz in the corner which he dodged, before then applying the Tazzmission to retain the titles.

The second match was between Edge and William Regal for the WWF Intercontinental Championship. Before the match, the referee found brass knuckles in Regal's tights, and confiscated them. The match went back and forth, until Regal knocked Edge out of the ring. Once back inside this ring, Regal applied the Regal Stretch, but Edge reached the ropes to break the hold. Edge then attempted a spear, but Regal pushed the referee in his path, incapacitating him. Regal then took out another pair of brass knuckles which he had hidden, and hit Edge with them. The referee then recovered to count the pinfall, and Regal won the title.

The next match was between Trish Stratus and Jazz for the WWF Women's Championship, with Jacqueline as the special guest referee. Jazz had the early advantage, focusing on Stratus' injured hand. Jazz then confronted Jacqueline, and they shoved each other. Stratus attempted to capitalize by hitting Jazz with a bulldog, but Jazz countered with a roll-up, and executed a snap DDT for a near fall. Stratus then blocked an attack in the corner, and delivered a bulldog to win the match, and retain the title.

The fourth match was a Street Fight between Ric Flair and Vince McMahon. Flair quickly gained the early advantage with punches and knife edge chops. McMahon then attacked him with weapons, and sent him into the ringpost and steps. McMahon then applied the figure four leglock, but Flair reversed it. McMahon reached the ropes, and retreated outside the ring. Flair then hit McMahon with a low blow, a television monitor, and a lead pipe. Flair then forced McMahon to submit to the figure four leglock to win the match.

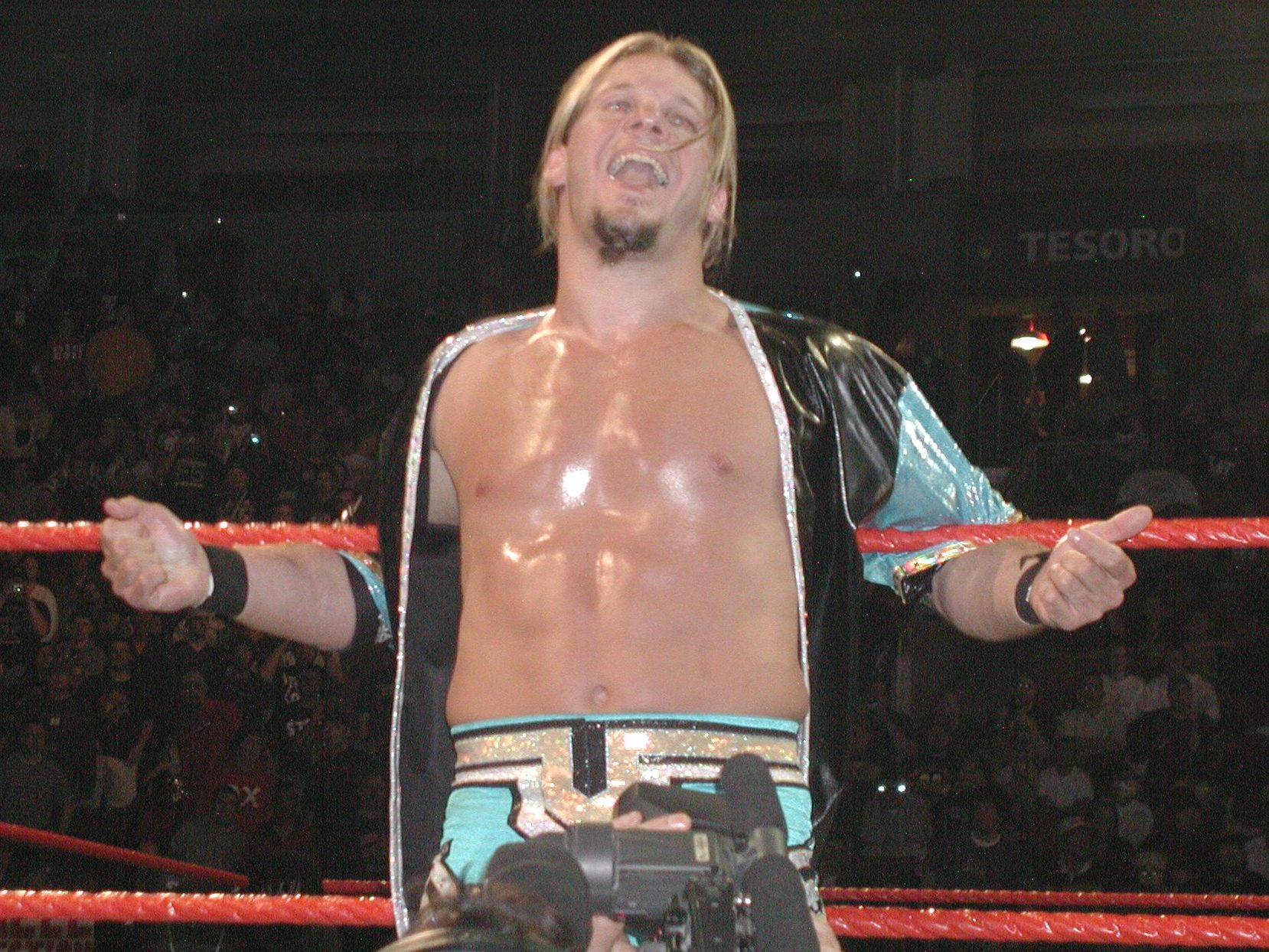
Chris Jericho, the Undisputed WWF Champion

The semi-main event was between Chris Jericho and The Rock for the Undisputed WWF Championship. The Rock quickly took control of the match and got a near-fall following a samoan drop. However, Jericho soon regained control, and removed the padding off one of the turnbuckles. Jericho then attempted the Walls of Jericho, but The Rock escaped. Jericho continued his control, until The Rock delivered a superplex, and a snap overhead belly to belly suplex. Jericho retaliated with two Lionsaults. The Rock then countered an attempted missile dropkick, and applied the Sharpshooter. Just then, Lance Storm and Christian distracted the referee as Jericho submitted, meaning The Rock could not win the title. As The Rock disposed of them, Jericho took advantage and executed a Rock Bottom and attempted a People's Elbow, but The Rock avoided it and threw Jericho out of the ring. Jericho then gained back some control and tried to hit a Rock Bottom through the Spanish announce table, but The Rock countered and executed a Rock Bottom of his own through the English announce table. Back in the ring, The Rock covered Jericho for a close near-fall. Jericho then countered another attempted Rock Bottom and again applied the Walls of Jericho, but The Rock reached the ropes and rolled Jericho up for another close near-fall on the second attempt. The Rock then accidentally hit the referee, and Jericho took advantage by hitting The Rock with the WWF title belt. Jericho then signaled for Nick Patrick (a heel referee) to come out and referee the match. The Rock then executed a DDT, but Patrick refused to count the pinfall. The Rock then attacked Patrick with a Rock Bottom, and executed a Spinebuster and a People's Elbow on Jericho. As The Rock tried to revive the original referee, Earl Hebner, Jericho again took advantage and hit a low blow, and sent The Rock into the exposed turnbuckle. Jericho then pinned The Rock with a roll-up using the ropes as extra leverage to retain the title.

=== Main event ===
The main event was the Royal Rumble match. The Undertaker, the eighth entrant, dominated upon entering the match, and eliminated all four of the remaining participants. Matt Hardy entered next and Lita, who accompanied Matt, entered the ring to help. The next entrant was Jeff Hardy, and all three attacked The Undertaker, reigniting their previous rivalry with him. The Undertaker eventually eliminated them both. The Hardys returned, however, and continued their attack, but were thrown out again. This distraction allowed Maven, the following entrant, to eliminate The Undertaker. The Undertaker returned, beat down Maven, and eliminated him. The Undertaker then assaulted Scotty 2 Hotty during his entrance, and continued his attack on Maven into the crowd, and to the backstage area, including smashing his head into a popcorn machine. The match continued with Christian and Scotty 2 Hotty battling it out, and the ring began to fill with more wrestlers. "Stone Cold" Steve Austin, the nineteenth entrant, dominated upon his entrance, and eliminated all three of the remaining participants. While he waited for the next entrant, he brought Christian and Chuck, whom he had eliminated, back in, and beat them down with Stone Cold Stunners, before throwing them back over the top rope . Austin then eliminated the next two entrants, leaving him as the only man in the ring. Triple H then made his official in-ring return from injury at No. 22, brawling with Austin. Mr. Perfect returned as the twenty-fifth entrant to a loud ovation. The Big Show, the twenty-seventh entrant, dominated upon entering, until Kane entered next. Kane eliminated The Big Show, before Kane was also eliminated by Austin and Kurt Angle, the twenty-sixth entrant. Rob Van Dam made his Royal Rumble debut by entering the ring at No. 29, taking down nearly everyone with a variety of high-flying moves, until Triple H delivered the Pedigree to him. Booker T, also making his Royal Rumble debut, entered at No. 30, and quickly eliminated Van Dam. He then performed the "Spin-A-Roonie", and was quickly eliminated from the Rumble after receiving a Stone Cold Stunner from Austin.

The final four remaining were Austin, Triple H, Angle and Perfect. Angle executed an Angle Slam on Triple H and three German suplexes on Austin. Austin then hit a low blow on Angle, but Perfect and Angle double-teamed him. Angle then eliminated Austin as he was trying to eliminate Perfect. Austin then pulled Perfect outside and attacked him, before Angle attacked Austin from behind. Back in the ring, Perfect and Angle attacked Triple H. Austin once again entered the ring and hit Perfect, Angle and Triple H with a steel chair before finally leaving. Angle then attacked Perfect with a clothesline by accident, and Perfect executed a Perfect-Plex on Angle out retaliation. Triple H then eliminated Perfect with a clothesline, leaving only Angle and Triple H as the final two. It went back and forth before Angle sent Triple H over the top rope with a back body drop, but Triple H held on. Angle thought he had won, and prematurely celebrated. Triple H took advantage, and executed a facebuster knee smash on Angle, followed by a clothesline over the top rope to win the Royal Rumble match.

== Reception ==
In 2011, Jack Bramma of 411Mania gave the event a rating of 7.5 [Good], writing, "Despite the super hot crowd, this is a great rumble but only a good show altogether. The Rock-Jericho match is mildly disappointing knowing what they are capable of and the Flair-Vince match is nowhere near the level of even Vince’s best garbage matches. The Edge-Regal match is a good title match but easily missable. [Not] overwhelmingly outstanding, but still a solid recommendation."

== Aftermath ==
Austin won a number one contender's match against Kurt Angle on the January 28 episode of Raw to earn a match for the Undisputed WWF Championship at No Way Out. A feud between Austin and Chris Jericho started with Jericho interfering in Austin's match by attacking him with his title belt.

The Undertaker continued his feud with Maven over the elimination during the Royal Rumble match, which grew to include The Rock after he mocked The Undertaker for his quick elimination. The Undertaker's interference led to The Rock losing to Kurt Angle in the tournament to challenge for the Undisputed championship at No Way Out. On the February 4 episode of Raw, during a tag team match, The Undertaker grabbed a steel lead pipe from his motorcycle and nailed The Rock in the head with it, allowing Chris Jericho to score the pinfall win. The Rock retaliated by hitting him with a chair and helping Maven win the WWF Hardcore Championship that The Undertaker had won at Vengeance; however The Undertaker performed a Tombstone Piledriver on The Rock onto the hood of a limousine in revenge. A match was made between the two at No Way Out.

Kurt Angle started a feud with Triple H, unhappy about how he lost the Royal Rumble match, and attacked Triple H after a confrontation. During Triple H's match with Booker T, Angle interfered and attacked Triple H. Angle then had Vince McMahon make a match between the two at No Way Out for Triple H's title shot at WrestleMania X8. Triple H and his on-screen wife Stephanie McMahon were having problems, so she faked a pregnancy and demanded that they renew their wedding vows. Triple H discovered the truth, and ended their marriage. Stephanie McMahon then announced herself as the guest referee in the match at No Way Out.

The 2002 Royal Rumble was the last Royal Rumble held under the WWF name, as in May 2002, the promotion was renamed to World Wrestling Entertainment (WWE). It was also the last Royal Rumble until 2014 in which there was only one world championship for the Rumble winner to challenge for as in March 2002, the promotion introduced the first brand extension, which split the roster into two distinct brands, Raw and SmackDown!, where the wrestlers were exclusively assigned to perform. At first, the Undisputed Championship was available to both brands, but in September, it became exclusive to SmackDown! and renamed to WWE Championship after Raw introduced the World Heavyweight Championship as their top title. Additionally, King of the Ring was discontinued as a PPV following its 2002 event, thus the Royal Rumble, along with WrestleMania, SummerSlam, and Survivor Series, reverted to being called the "Big Four" until October 2021 when Money in the Bank was recognized as one of the "Big Five".

== Results ==
No.	Results	Stipulations	Times
1	Spike Dudley and Tazz (c) defeated The Dudley Boyz (Bubba Ray and D-Von) (with Stacy Keibler)	Tag team match for the WWF Tag Team Championship	5:06
2	William Regal defeated Edge (c)	Singles match for the WWF Intercontinental Championship	9:45
3	Trish Stratus (c) defeated Jazz	Singles match for the WWF Women's Championship with Jacqueline as special guest referee	3:43
4	Ric Flair defeated Mr. McMahon	Street Fight	14:55
5	Chris Jericho (c) defeated The Rock	Singles match for the Undisputed WWF Championship	18:50
6	Triple H won by last eliminating Kurt Angle	30-man Royal Rumble match for an Undisputed WWF Championship match at WrestleMania X8	1:09:23
(c) / – the champion(s) heading into the match

=== Royal Rumble entrances and eliminations ===
A new entrant came out approximately every 2 minutes.

– Winner

Draw	Entrant	Order eliminated	Eliminated by	Time	Eliminations
1	Rikishi	6	The Undertaker	13:39	1
2	Goldust	4	The Undertaker	12:52	0
3	Big Boss Man	1	Rikishi	03:05	0
4	Bradshaw	3	Billy	07:17	0
5	Lance Storm	2	Al Snow	04:46	0
6	Al Snow	5	The Undertaker	05:12	1
7	Billy	7	The Undertaker	03:37	1
8	The Undertaker	10	Maven	07:40	7
9	Matt Hardy	9	The Undertaker	04:16	0
10	Jeff Hardy	8	The Undertaker	01:30	0
11	Maven	11	The Undertaker	03:34	1
12	Scotty 2 Hotty	12	Diamond Dallas Page	02:36	0
13	Christian	16	"Stone Cold" Steve Austin	12:14	3
14	Diamond Dallas Page	13	Christian	05:15	1
15	Chuck	17	"Stone Cold" Steve Austin	09:04	2
16	The Godfather	15	Chuck and Christian	01:48	0
17	Albert	14	Chuck and Christian	00:48	0
18	Perry Saturn	18	"Stone Cold" Steve Austin	02:57	0
19	"Stone Cold" Steve Austin	27	Kurt Angle & Mr. Perfect	26:46	7
20	Val Venis	19	"Stone Cold" Steve Austin	02:58	0
21	Test	20	"Stone Cold" Steve Austin	01:42	0
22	Triple H	-	Winner	23:14	4
23	The Hurricane	21	"Stone Cold" Steve Austin & Triple H	00:39	0
24	Faarooq	22	Triple H	00:36	0
25	Mr. Perfect	28	Triple H	15:18	1
26	Kurt Angle	29	Triple H	16:09	2
27	Big Show	23	Kane	02:45	0
28	Kane	24	Kurt Angle	01:02	1
29	Rob Van Dam	25	Booker T	02:12	0
30	Booker T	26	"Stone Cold" Steve Austin	00:33	1

Undertaker assaulted and eliminated Maven following his own elimination by Maven.
This was Austin's 36th career elimination in the Royal Rumble, which was a record held for eight years until Shawn Michaels broke it in the 2010 Royal Rumble.
