= Undisputed championship (professional wrestling) =

Unquestioned top title in a promotion

The "undisputed championship" is a professional wrestling term for a world title that is the unquestioned top championship in a promotion, often formed from two world titles being unified or held by the same individual.

== The first undisputed champions ==
The reported first undisputed champion was George Hackenschmidt, who won a series of tournaments in Europe, including a world championship tournament to win the original World Heavyweight Championship. Amongst the other tournaments he won were the annual major tournaments in Paris, France; Hamburg, Germany; St. Petersburg, Russia; and Berlin, Germany. Hackenschmidt also defeated European Greco-Roman Champion Tom Cannon on September 4, 1902, in Liverpool, England to become the first undisputed World Heavyweight Champion.

The only other reigning champion with claim to the belt at the time was Tom Jenkins the American Heavyweight Championship, which unified the American Greco-Roman Championship with the American Catch-As-Catch Can Championship. Jenkins was eventually defeated by Frank Gotch, who took over as the only man with a potentially legitimate claim to being "the true champion".

Hackenschmidt and Gotch finally met in the ring on April 3, 1908, in Chicago, Illinois. Gotch defeated Hackenschmidt to win the World Heavyweight Championship, then abandoned the American Heavyweight Championship in a process similar to today's championship unification. Gotch wrestled for several years before retiring as undisputed champion

Other wrestlers who were recognized as the only major World Champion following Gotch's retirement were Earl Caddock, Joe Stecher, Ed "Strangler" Lewis, Stanislaus Zbyszko, and Wayne Munn. The championship became disputed in the late 1920s, and remained that way for over 20 years, when several major World Heavyweight Championships split from the primary title (namely, Boston's American Wrestling Association World Heavyweight Championship, the National Boxing Association (later, National Wrestling Association) World Championship of Wrestling, and the New York State Athletic Commission World Heavyweight Championship). Other governing bodies would create their own version of the World Championship in the 1930s and 1940s, as well.

== Lou Thesz and the National Wrestling Alliance ==
After Gotch's retirement, several other men proceeded to hold the then World Heavyweight Championship, including periods of time where the National Wrestling Association formed a second World Heavyweight Championship to contend with the formerly undisputed belt. From that point onward, there was no undisputed champion, as multiple men laid claim to the title without ever backing it up by defeating multiple other contenders.

This all changed in July 1948, when the National Wrestling Alliance (NWA) was formed by multiple promotions and awarded the NWA World Heavyweight Championship to Orville Brown. After Brown suffered career-ending injuries in an automobile accident on November 1, 1949, the NWA recognised Lou Thesz as the champion. Thesz had earlier won the National Wrestling Association's World Heavyweight Championship on July 10, 1948, from Wild Bill Longson.

In light of having unified three of the major world heavyweight championships of his time (as well as numerous other lesser-prestige titles) and defeating the reigning AWA World Heavyweight Champion in a non-title match (a major title that was abandoned soon after), Thesz became the Undisputed Champion for some time. From that point onward, the National Wrestling Alliance World Heavyweight Championship (the championship belt that Thesz opted to keep as the designation of all the championships he had won) became the undisputed world heavyweight title for all contenders to seek.

This, however, would change over the years and decades to come as professional wrestling grew and evolved. The American Wrestling Association, owned by Verne Gagne split off from the NWA and declared their primary singles title a world title in 1960. The World Wide Wrestling Federation, owned by Vince McMahon, Sr. followed suit in 1963 and declared their major singles title a world championship. Many other NWA affiliated promotions would split from the NWA over the years with Ted Turner's World Championship Wrestling in 1993, and Tod Gordon's Eastern Championship Wrestling in 1994. Each of these promotions declared their primary singles championship to be a world championship.

== World Wrestling Federation/Entertainment ==
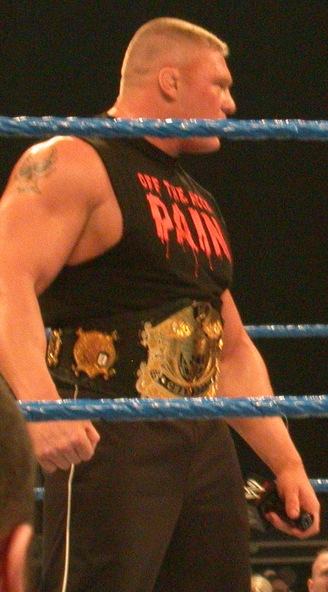
Brock Lesnar with the belt used to represent the Undisputed Championship from April 2002 to September 2002. Lesnar was the last recognized Undisputed Champion as the championship became the WWE Championship in September 2002.

=== 2001: Undisputed WWF Championship ===
When the AWA folded in 1991 with Larry Zbyszko as their final champion, one of the last major world titles was gone. Meanwhile, the NWA became less prevalent during the Monday night television ratings war that engrossed the WWF and WCW during the 1990s. ECW shut down in 2001 with Rhino as their last champion, seemingly leaving the group of prominent world championships down to two, and with WCW's subsequent fall and purchase by the WWF during the same year, the World Wrestling Federation Championship remained.

WWF took full advantage of their situation, unifying the World Championship (formerly the WCW World Heavyweight Championship) and WWF Championship at Vengeance in 2001, with Chris Jericho becoming the first Undisputed WWF Champion (and the first undisputed champion in over 50 years in professional wrestling in general). The championship was then represented by the belts of its two predecessors until a singular belt design was commissioned. By May 2002, the WWF had been renamed to World Wrestling Entertainment and the Undisputed WWE Championship, as it was now called, became the top championship of the promotion.

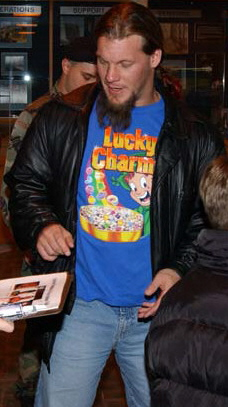
The first Undisputed WWF Champion Chris Jericho.

With the purchase of WCW during the previous year, WWE's roster had doubled in size and with newly obtained properties and a desire to further expand, the promotion was essentially divided in what became known as the WWE Brand Extension. This resulted in WWE's two main programs, Raw and SmackDown, becoming distinct brands, acting as complementing promotions under WWE. The WWE Undisputed Championship was then consequently shared between both brands and soon conflict began brewing over the title. In late August 2002, after becoming the youngest WWE world champion at the time by winning the WWE Undisputed Championship, Brock Lesnar and his title were made exclusive to SmackDown. To remedy this, the Big Gold Belt was brought back the following month to represent the new World Heavyweight Championship and became Raw's top championship, thus making the WWE Championship no longer undisputed.

=== 2011: WWE Championship disputed; 2013: WWE World Heavyweight Championship ===
In 2011, the WWE Championship was temporarily referred to as "undisputed" again. After a storyline in which John Cena and CM Punk both claimed the WWE Championship, the two faced off at SummerSlam, resulting in a single title holder. This was not, however, the same as the undisputed title that existed between 2001 and 2002, as the World Heavyweight Championship was unaffected.

Immediately following SummerSlam 2011, the brand extension officially ended, meaning that both the WWE Champion and the World Heavyweight Champion could appear on both Raw and SmackDown. In November 2013, then World Heavyweight Champion John Cena made a challenge to then WWE Champion Randy Orton to determine WWE's undisputed world champion; the match would take place at the TLC: Tables, Ladders & Chairs pay-per-view the following month. Randy Orton defeated John Cena in a TLC match and unified the titles. Subsequently, the World Heavyweight Championship was retired and the WWE Championship was renamed the WWE World Heavyweight Championship and retained its lineage. Like the WWE Undisputed Championship, the WWE World Heavyweight Championship was represented by the belts of its two predecessors until a singular belt design was commissioned in August 2014.

In June 2016, the WWE World Heavyweight Championship reverted to being called the WWE Championship before WWE reintroduced the brand extension the following month. The WWE Champion was drafted to SmackDown and it was renamed the WWE World Championship though reverted to WWE Championship in December 2016. In response, Raw created their own world championship, the WWE Universal Championship.

=== 2022: Undisputed WWE (Universal) Championship & Undisputed WWE Tag Team Championship ===
At WrestleMania 38 in 2022, the Universal Championship held by Roman Reigns from SmackDown and the WWE Championship held by Brock Lesnar from Raw were unified. The winner of the match, Roman Reigns, was then referred to as the Undisputed WWE Universal Champion. Although WWE billed the match as a championship unification, both titles have maintained their individual lineages.

On the May 20, 2022, episode of SmackDown, the SmackDown Tag Team Championship held by The Usos (Jey Uso and Jimmy Uso) and the Raw Tag Team Championship held by RK-Bro (Randy Orton and Riddle) were unified. The winners of the match, The Usos, were then referred to as the Undisputed WWE Tag Team Champions. Although WWE billed the match as a championship unification, both titles have maintained their individual lineages. They lost the titles to Kevin Owens and Sami Zayn at WrestleMania 39 in 2023, with Owens and Zayn becoming the Undisputed WWE Tag Team Champions. On Day 1 of WrestleMania XL, the Undisputed WWE Tag Team Championship were defended in a ladder match, but this time both titles hung above the latter separately in the Six-Pack Tag Team Ladder match with the rules being for two teams to win the match with two out of eight grabbing a title separately. After the match, Awesome Truth won by receiving the Raw Tag Team Championship and A-Town Down Under won by receiving the Smackdown Tag Team Championship officially having the 2 Tag Team titles split and no longer “undisputed”.

On the Day 2 of WrestleMania XL, Cody Rhodes won the Undisputed WWE Universal Championship against Roman Reigns therefore being referred and reverted simply as Undisputed WWE Championship, ending Reigns’ 4-year reign as champion. Despite the name change, the WWE Universal Championship lineage continued until April 20, 2025 when Rhodes lost the title to John Cena at WrestleMania 41; the Universal Championship was then retired with its records being amended to remove Rhodes's reign, thereby making Reigns the final champion.

== See also ==
- Championship unification
- Grand Slam (professional wrestling) – Professional wrestling accomplishment
- List of early world heavyweight champions in professional wrestling
- Triple Crown (professional wrestling) – Professional wrestling accomplishment
