= Vengeance (2001) =

World Wrestling Federation pay-per-view event

- Promotional poster featuring Triple H and his signature sledgehammer.
- Promotion: World Wrestling Federation
- Date: December 9, 2001
- City: San Diego, California
- Venue: San Diego Sports Arena
- Attendance: 11,800
- Buy rate: 307,000

Pay-per-view chronology
← Previous; Survivor Series	Next → Royal Rumble

Vengeance chronology
← Previous; First	Next → 2002

The 2001 Vengeance was a professional wrestling pay-per-view (PPV) event produced by the World Wrestling Federation (WWF, now WWE). It was the inaugural Vengeance and took place on December 9, 2001, at the San Diego Sports Arena in San Diego, California.

The event temporarily replaced the promotion's annual December PPV, Armageddon, for the year 2001 in response to the September 11 attacks as the WWF felt the name "Armageddon" may be offensive to the victims. The following year, Vengeance was moved up to July as Armageddon was reinstated for that December. As such, it was the only Vengeance held before the introduction of the brand extension in March 2002 and the only Vengeance promoted under the WWF name as the promotion was renamed to World Wrestling Entertainment (WWE) in May 2002.

The event is notable for its triple main event, which was a three-match tournament to unify the WWF Championship and the World Championship (formerly the WCW Championship) as the Undisputed WWF Championship. In the first match, "Stone Cold" Steve Austin defeated Kurt Angle to retain the WWF Championship. In the second match, Chris Jericho defeated The Rock to win the World Championship. In the final match, Jericho defeated Austin to become the Undisputed WWF Champion. The Undisputed WWF Championship followed the lineage of the WWF Championship while the lineage of the World Championship was immediately retired after Jericho's win, with Jericho recognized as its final holder although he would carry both belts as the undisputed champion—a singular championship belt was introduced in April 2002 after Jericho lost the undisputed title to Triple H at WrestleMania X8.

== Production ==
=== Background ===
In 1999 and 2000, the World Wrestling Federation (WWF, now WWE) held a December professional wrestling pay-per-view (PPV) event entitled Armageddon. The event was originally planned to return in 2001, however, following the September 11 attacks, WWF staff felt that the "Armageddon" name may potentially be considered offensive to the victims of the terrorist attacks. In turn, the WWF replaced that year's Armageddon with an event titled Vengeance, and it was scheduled to be held on December 9, 2001, at the San Diego Sports Arena in San Diego, California.

=== Storylines ===
The Invasion, which began in March 2001, ended at Survivor Series when Team WWF won a "Winner Takes All" Survivor Series match. The Alliance was forced to close business as a result, and all their titles, except for the WCW Championship, which was rebranded simply as the World Championship, were abandoned (the remaining championships were unified with their respective WWF equivalents, and subsequently deactivated, except for the WCW Cruiserweight Championship, which became a WWF title in favor over the WWF Light Heavyweight Championship). On Raw the following night, WWF Owner Vince McMahon attempted to strip "Stone Cold" Steve Austin, who was a member of The Alliance, of his WWF Championship, and award it to Kurt Angle due to his actions in costing The Alliance the match at Survivor Series. However, before he could do so, Ric Flair, who had not been seen on any wrestling program since Vince's purchase of World Championship Wrestling (WCW) in March 2001, interrupted Vince and explained that the leaders of The Alliance, Shane McMahon and Stephanie McMahon, had sold their stake in the WWF to him, and that he was now equal partners with Vince. Austin then attacked both Angle and Vince, after which, Flair presented him with his title belt.

Soon after, Flair scheduled a match between Austin and The Rock, the holder of the World Championship, to unify both titles and create one undisputed championship. Vince, however, convinced Flair to create a four-man tournament instead. Two matches were made, with Austin defending the WWF Championship against Angle, and The Rock defending the World Championship against Chris Jericho. The winners of these matches would then face each other in a third match where the winner would be the first Undisputed WWF Champion.

Both title matches were rooted in feuds that were carrying over from earlier in the year. Austin and Angle had become allies after Triple H, with whom Austin had been in a team as The Two-Man Power Trip since after WrestleMania X-Seven, went down with an injury, leaving Austin without a partner. Around this time, The Invasion was taking hold of the WWF, and in July at the InVasion event, Austin and Angle were part of Team WWF in a 10-man tag team match against five members of The Alliance. During the match, Austin turned on Team WWF and hit Angle with a Stone Cold Stunner, allowing Team Alliance to win. On the July 23 episode of Raw Is War, Austin, now the leader of The Alliance, stated that he did this because he felt that Vince was grooming Angle to take over his spot, and that he was "unappreciated" when Vince insisted he return to the old Austin.

Angle, who became a fan favorite as a result of Austin's treachery, immediately began challenging Austin for the WWF Championship. His first chance came at SummerSlam, which Angle won by disqualification, allowing Austin to retain the title. At Unforgiven in September, Angle forced Austin to submit to his ankle lock, and won the WWF Championship in front of his hometown fans in Pittsburgh, Pennsylvania. Austin demanded a rematch, claiming his hand was under the ropes when he tapped out, and received it on the October 8 episode of Raw. Austin regained the title when William Regal, the WWF Commissioner and special enforcer, attacked Angle and joined The Alliance.

Three weeks later, Angle successfully defended the WCW United States Championship against Regal. Angle later joined The Alliance during a WrestleMania X-Seven rematch between Vince and then-WCW owner and son Shane: he interfered seemingly to aid Vince, but instead struck the members of the team representing WWF with a steel chair. However, Vince revealed that he had planted a "mole" in The Alliance, and Angle revealed himself to be that person at Survivor Series, which led to the aforementioned events involving Flair and Austin.

The feud between The Rock and Jericho had started while the two were uneasy allies due to their mutual hatred of Alliance co-owner Stephanie. The Rock kept reminding Jericho that he had never won "the big one" (a world heavyweight championship), and wrote Jericho off as a "comedy act". On the October 11 episode of SmackDown!, Jericho defeated Rob Van Dam of The Alliance to become the number one contender to The Rock's WCW Championship (later renamed the World Championship after Survivor Series). At No Mercy, Jericho defeated The Rock to win the title, becoming a world champion for the first time in his career. The following night on Raw, Jericho and The Rock set aside their differences and won the WWF Tag Team Championship when they defeated The Dudley Boyz (Bubba Ray Dudley and D-Von Dudley). On the October 29 episode of Raw, The Rock and Jericho successfully defended the WWF Tag Team Championship against then-Alliance members Booker T and Test, but a few days later on SmackDown!, they dropped the titles to Booker T and Test after Jericho inadvertently missile dropkicked The Rock, enabling Test to hit Rock with a big boot for the victory. After the match, The Rock and Jericho stared each other down, which ended with The Rock hitting Jericho with two Rock Bottoms. Later that episode, The Rock challenged Jericho for the WCW Championship in a No Mercy rematch. On the November 5 episode of Raw, The Rock defeated Jericho to win the title back with a surprise roll up, beginning his second WCW Championship reign. Irate at having lost the title, Jericho savagely attacked The Rock after the match, and hit him with a steel chair and the championship belt. Jericho was made part of Team WWF for the Winner Take All match at Survivor Series, promising that he would set aside his differences with The Rock for the good of the company. However, Jericho attacked The Rock following his elimination from the match, and nearly cost Team WWF the victory. The feud resumed after Jericho attacked The Rock on Raw the next night, and escalated leading up to Vengeance.

== Event ==
Other on-screen personnel
Role:	Name:
English commentators	Jim Ross
English commentators	Jerry Lawler
Spanish commentators	Carlos Cabrera
Spanish commentators	Hugo Savinovich
Backstage interviewers	Jonathan Coachman
Ring announcer	Howard Finkel
Referees	Charles Robinson
Referees	Mike Chioda
Referees	Nick Patrick
Referees	Teddy Long
Referees	Earl Hebner
Referees	Tim White
Referees	Chad Patton

=== Sunday Night Heat ===
Before the event went live on pay-per-view, The APA (Bradshaw and Faarooq) defeated Billy and Chuck in a match, taped for Sunday Night Heat.

=== Preliminary matches ===
The opening match was a tag team match between Scotty 2 Hotty and Albert, and Christian and Test. Before the match had even started, Scotty and Albert started attacking Christian and Test. Scotty dominated in the beginning, but the much larger Test soon tagged in. Albert, who was of Test's size, then tagged in. Scotty and Albert double-teamed Test before Christian attacked Scotty. Test and Christian took the opportunity and assaulted Scotty, preventing him from tagging in Albert. Scotty fought them off however and tagged in Albert. Albert dominated both of them and set Christian up for a Baldo Bomb, but Test pulled Albert out of the ring. Scotty hit Christian with a bulldog, and attempted a Worm, but Christian knocked him down. Christian tried to hit the Worm, but Albert stopped him. Test made the save by hitting Albert with a big boot. Scotty hit a bulldog on Test, and hit a Worm. Christian tried to hit Scotty with an Unprettier, but Albert hit Christian with a Baldo Bomb for the victory.

The second match was between Edge and William Regal for Edge's WWF Intercontinental Championship. At the beginning of the match Edge had the advantage, showing his speed and agility. However Regal threw Edge out of the ring, and knocked him against the barricade. In the ring, Regal hit Edge with a series of European uppercuts, and reversed a sunset flip into a knee drop. Edge fought back and got several near-falls before Regal knocked Edge with a forearm smash, but Edge kicked Regal to the outside. On the ring apron, Edge tried to hit Regal with a diving spear on the floor but Regal sidestepped and Edge crashed into the steel ring steps. As the referee was distracted, Regal took out a pair of brass knuckles from under the ring and stuffed them into his tights. In the ring, Regal hit Edge with a powerbomb and two double underhook suplexes. Regal then hit Edge with a series of brutal kicks and, when the referee turned around, he took out his brass knuckles. Edge immediately speared Regal to win and retain his title.

The third match was between Matt Hardy and Jeff Hardy, with Lita as the special guest referee. In the beginning, the two had several reversals until Matt got in control. Jeff sidestepped when Matt attempted a diving leg drop. Jeff hit a falling headbutt and a clothesline. Jeff went on to deliver a diving leg drop of his own. Jeff went to the top rope but Matt trapped him in a Tree of Woe. Matt then applied the sunset flip, which Jeff countered and both men were lying outside the ring. In the ring, Jeff injured his left knee, which Matt would work on. He hit a chop block and a series of moves. He tried a powerbomb, but Jeff countered it into a Compactor Clutch. Matt assaulted Jeff again with a half Boston crab. Jeff got to the ropes, breaking the hold, and kicked Matt to the outside. Jeff went to the top, but because of his hurt knee he fell. Matt grabbed Jeff's leg but Jeff hit a mule kick. Matt tried a Twist of Fate, but Jeff countered it into a leg drop. Jeff hit a suplex and went to the top rope again, but because of his knee Matt took advantage and clutched him. Matt tried to hit a Twist of Fate but Jeff reversed it into his own. Matt attempted a pinfall on Jeff and used the ring ropes for leverage but Lita ordered him to break it. Jeff went to the top rope again, but Matt caught him and tried to hit him with a Twist of Fate from the top. Jeff forced Matt off and hit a Swanton Bomb. Matt tried to get his feet on the ropes, but Jeff pulled them off and won the match.

The fourth match was between The Dudley Boyz (Bubba Ray Dudley and D-Von Dudley) and Big Show and Kane for the Dudley Boyz' WWF Tag Team Championship. Kane dominated in the beginning and tagged in Big Show. Big Show also dominated, but as he attempted a chokeslam Bubba Ray held the ropes and raked the eyes of Big Show. D-Von tagged in but received a sidewalk slam from Big Show. Big Show then hit D-Von with a series of hip attacks. Kane and Big Show dominated in the ring, knocking the Dudleys out of the ring. Kane went to the top rope and jumped to the outside, knocking out the Dudley Boyz. In the ring, Stacy Keibler tried to encourage the Dudley Boyz, but Big Show snuck up and pulled down her skirt. The Dudley Boyz hit Kane with a double suplex and started working on him. They gave Kane a diving headbutt low blow, and a series of double-team maneuvers. They set him for the Dudley Death Drop but Kane kicked D-Von in the head and hit Bubba Ray with a clothesline. Kane tagged in Big Show, who tried to chokeslam D-Von but Bubba Ray hit him a chop block. Kane tried to hit D-Von with a flying clothesline but accidentally hit Big Show. The Dudleys fell to the outside while Kane and Big Show argued in the ring. The Dudley Boyz then hit Big Show with a Hotshot onto an exposed turnbuckle for the win, retaining their title.

The fifth match was between The Undertaker and Rob Van Dam for Van Dam's WWF Hardcore Championship. Early in the match, Van Dam hit The Undertaker with a top-rope somersault. The Undertaker crotched Van Dam on the top rope and knocked him to the outside. He tried to drive him into the ringpost, but Van Dam reversed and knocked him into the ringpost instead. Van Dam attacked The Undertaker with the barricade, and tried to hit a bodypress but The Undertaker punched him. The Undertaker tossed him over a railing and choked Van Dam on the floor. The Undertaker tried to use a steel chair, but Van Dam hit him with a fire extinguisher. He hit The Undertaker's head with a trash can, and a flying crossbody. They fought on the stage where Van Dam hit a somersault leg drop. The Undertaker drove Van Dam's head on the stage and attempted a Last Ride, but Van Dam held onto the stage. The Undertaker went backstage and came back with a chair but Van Dam kicked it. He hit a Rolling Thunder on the stage and a Chair Surf. He tried to hit a Van Daminator but missed, and The Undertaker hit him with the chair. The Undertaker chokeslammed Van Dam off the stage through a set of tables for the victory, and won his first and only WWF Hardcore Championship.

The sixth match was between Trish Stratus and Jacqueline for Stratus' WWF Women's Championship. Jacqueline wrestled a great match in the beginning while knocking Stratus to the mat several times. Stratus kicked Jacqueline several times but was unable to knock her down. However, Jacqueline knocked Stratus down by punching and kicking her on numerous occasions. She slammed Stratus twice and walked on her hair. Stratus however hit her with a clothesline for a near-fall. Jacqueline knocked Stratus down again but Stratus sent her into the corner. Stratus made a pinfall attempt with a victory roll for a near-fall. She tried to hit Jacqueline with the Stratusfaction but Jacqueline shoved her and kicked her for a near-fall. Stratus then hit and pinned her with a bridging backslide to win the match and retain her title.

=== Main event ===
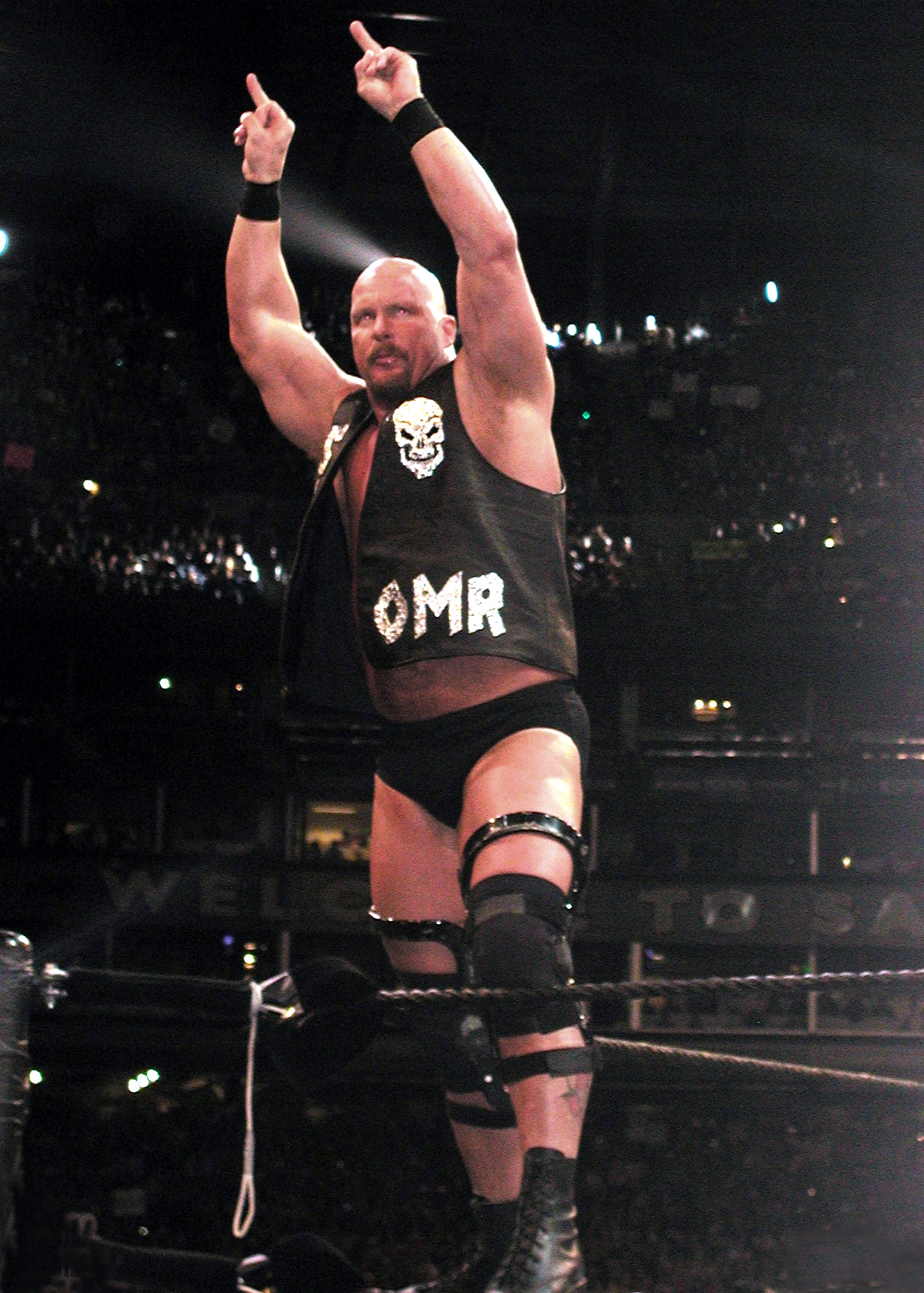
"Stone Cold" Steve Austin's trademark ring entrance.

The seventh, eighth and ninth matches of the evening comprised the main event championship unification tournament. The first match was the match between "Stone Cold" Steve Austin and Kurt Angle for Austin's WWF Championship. In the beginning, both men applied holds. Austin then took advantage and pounded Angle. The two had a test of strength and Angle applied the ankle lock. Austin kicked out of the hold and applied an armlock, followed by an eye rake. He choked Angle in the ropes and attacked his biceps. Austin threw Angle into the ringpost three times, injuring the left side of Angle's torso. In the ring, Austin used a armbar takedown on Angle's injured left shoulder. Angle then applied the ankle lock on Austin. Austin reached the ropes and Angle broke the hold. Austin followed by knocking Angle's head on the broadcast desk. Angle then wrapped Austin's leg around the ringpost, and applied the ringpost figure four leglock. Back in the ring, Angle applied the ankle lock but Austin rolled through. Angle hit a belly-to-belly suplex, and three German suplexes. Angle missed a moonsault, and Austin took advantage, hitting a Lou Thesz press, and a spinebuster. Austin then hit five German suplexes, but, while in the ropes, Angle hit a low blow, and an Angle Slam. Angle then tried to hit a Stone Cold Stunner, but Austin reversed it into his Stone Cold Stunner to win the match and retain his title.

This was followed by the second tournament match pitting Chris Jericho against The Rock for the World Championship. The two exchanged many holds and reversals in the beginning. Jericho hit a spinning heel kick and a missile dropkick. Jericho knocked The Rock's head into the steel ring steps and hit a flying back elbow. The Rock came back with a flying clothesline. Jericho applied a sleeper hold but The Rock fought out of it. Jericho then hit a one-handed bulldog and a Lionsault. Jericho went to the top rope, but The Rock crotched him on the top. The Rock tried a superplex but Jericho knocked him down and hit a flying crossbody, but The Rock rolled through for a near-fall. Jericho continued attacking The Rock, but The Rock sent Jericho's head into the ringpost. Jericho fell to the outside where he dropped The Rock onto the barricade, and catapulted him into the ringpost. Jericho then tried to hit a Rock Bottom through the broadcast desk, but The Rock reversed it into a People's DDT through the table. The Rock threw Jericho into the ring and set him up for a Rock Bottom, but Jericho countered it into a Breakdown. He set The Rock up for the People's Elbow, but The Rock caught his legs and tried to apply a Sharpshooter on Jericho, but Jericho reversed it into his own Sharpshooter. The Rock got to the ropes to break the hold. Jericho then attempted the Walls of Jericho, but The Rock countered it into a roll-up for a near-fall. The Rock hit a Rock Bottom, as Mr. McMahon came down to the ringside. The Rock went for the pinfall but McMahon distracted the referee. The Rock hit McMahon and hit a Spinebuster on Jericho. He brought McMahon into the ring and hit Jericho with a People's Elbow. The Rock attacked McMahon and, while the referee checked McMahon, Jericho hit a low blow and a Rock Bottom to win the match and the title.

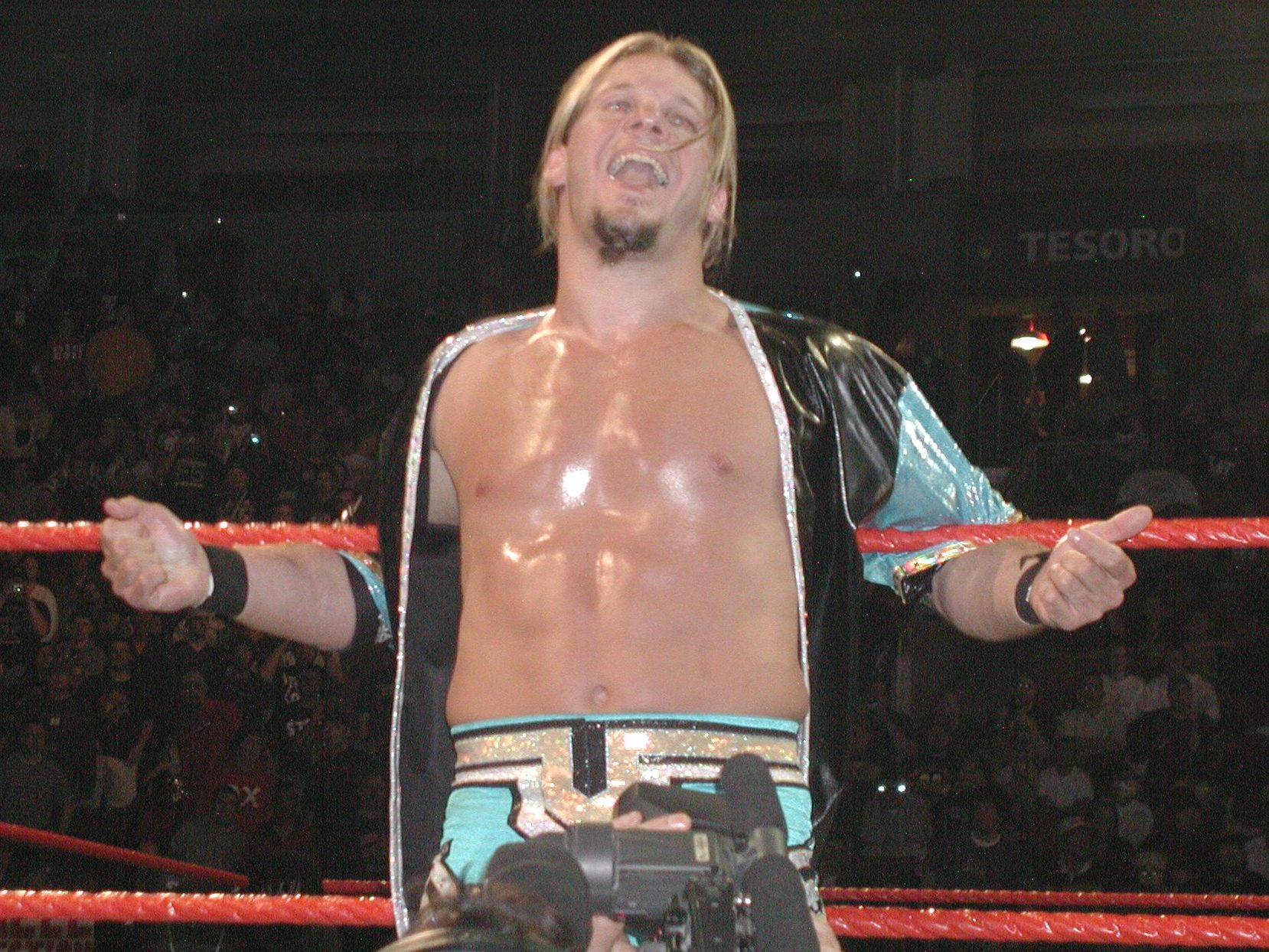
Chris Jericho became the first Undisputed WWF Champion at Vengeance.

Immediately following Jericho's win, Austin came back out to wrestle the final. Angle attacked Austin with a steel chair while The Rock went to attack Jericho with a Rock Bottom and chased Angle to the back. The match began with Austin spearing Jericho. The two fought on outside the ring and on the broadcast desk. Jericho took Austin to the top of the table where Austin tried to hit a Stone Cold Stunner. Jericho countered it into the Walls of Jericho but Austin flipped him off the table. On the floor, he suplexed Jericho and tossed him into the ring. The two fought out of the ring, and Jericho threw Austin shoulder-first into the ringpost. Jericho wrapped Austin's arm into an armbar, and used the ropes for leverage, but the referee caught onto this and broke the hold. Jericho attempted a flying forearm smash, but Austin ducked and Jericho hit the referee. Jericho hit a low blow and a Stone Cold Stunner. McMahon came out again and ordered Nick Patrick to referee the match. However, Ric Flair interfered and pulled Patrick out of the ring and attacked him. McMahon knocked Flair into the ringpost. Austin then hit a low blow and assaulted McMahon. He hit a Lou Thesz press on Jericho and applied the Walls of Jericho. Jericho tapped out but the referee was still down. Booker T came out and hit Austin with the WWF Championship belt from behind in the back of Austin's head, knocking him out. The referee recovered and Jericho capitalized on the interference, pinning Austin to win the match and become the first-ever Undisputed WWF Champion in the WWF. Although both belts represented the Undisputed WWF Championship, it only followed the lineage of the WWF Championship as the lineage of the World Championship was immediately retired after Jericho's win with Jericho recognized as its final holder.

== Aftermath ==
"Stone Cold" Steve Austin lost in a steel cage rematch against Chris Jericho for the Undisputed WWF Championship on the December 10 episode of Raw, due to interference from Booker T. Austin then briefly feuded with Booker T, which involved the famous supermarket brawl on the December 13 episode of SmackDown!, and with the returning Big Bossman. Jericho successfully defended his title against different opponents until The Rock earned a match for the Undisputed WWF Championship at the Royal Rumble on the January 3 episode of SmackDown!.

The feud between Edge and William Regal continued. Regal ambushed Edge several times with brass knuckles before finally challenging Edge to a rematch for the WWF Intercontinental Championship at the Royal Rumble, which Edge accepted. On the January 7 episode of Raw, buildup towards the Royal Rumble match started, with Austin, the returning Triple H, Kurt Angle, Kane, Big Show and The Undertaker all declaring their participation in the match, and starting a feud.

According to Kurt Angle, he was the original proposed winner of the main event and would have become the first Undisputed WWF Champion. However, one week before the event, Vince McMahon changed the plan and gave the title to Jericho since he was very popular with the fans.

The following year, Vengeance was moved up to July as Armageddon was reinstated for December, thus establishing Vengeance as an annual event for the promotion and replacing Fully Loaded as the regular holder of the July slot from 2002 – the latter had already been replaced for July 2001 by the one-off InVasion. The 2001 Vengeance would be the only Vengeance event promoted under the WWF name, as in May 2002 the company was renamed to World Wrestling Entertainment (WWE), after a lawsuit by the World Wildlife Fund over the WWF initialism. The 2001 event was also the only Vengeance to be held before the first brand extension was enacted in March 2002, in which the promotion divided its roster into two distinct brands, Raw and SmackDown!, where the wrestlers were exclusively assigned to perform. Vengeance would continue annually until 2007. That year, it was a joint-promoted event titled Vengeance: Night of Champions, being both the seventh Vengeance event as well as the inaugural Night of Champions event. Vengeance was then discontinued in favor of continuing Night of Champions. In 2011, Vengeance was reinstated, but separate from Night of Champions. However, Vengeance was again discontinued, this time until 2021. That year, WWE revived the PPV for their NXT brand as a TakeOver event titled Vengeance Day, the name of which was also a play on the event's Valentine's Day scheduling.

== Results ==
No.	Results	Stipulations	Times
1^{H}	The APA (Bradshaw and Faarooq) defeated Billy and Chuck	Tag team match	3:46
2	Scotty 2 Hotty and Albert defeated Christian and Test	Tag team match	6:19
3	Edge (c) defeated William Regal	Singles match for the WWF Intercontinental Championship	9:06
4	Jeff Hardy defeated Matt Hardy	Singles match with Lita as special guest referee	12:30
5	The Dudley Boyz (Bubba Ray and D-Von) (c) (with Stacy Keibler) defeated Big Show and Kane	Tag team match for the WWF Tag Team Championship	6:50
6	The Undertaker defeated Rob Van Dam (c)	Hardcore match for the WWF Hardcore Championship	11:04
7	Trish Stratus (c) defeated Jacqueline	Singles match for the WWF Women's Championship	3:34
8	"Stone Cold" Steve Austin (c) defeated Kurt Angle	Singles match for the WWF Championship	14:56
9	Chris Jericho defeated The Rock (c)	Singles match for the WCW World Heavyweight Championship	19:06
10	Chris Jericho (WCW) defeated "Stone Cold" Steve Austin (WWF)	Unification match to unify the WWF Championship and the WCW World Heavyweight Championship as the Undisputed WWF Championship	12:32
(c) / – the champion(s) heading into the match; H / – the match was broadcast prior to the pay-per-view on Sunday Night Heat

=== Undisputed WWF Championship Tournament bracket ===
1st Round; Vengeance; December 9, 2001
WWF Championship	"Stone Cold" Steve Austin (c)	Pinfall
—	Kurt Angle	14:56
WCW World Heavyweight Championship	The Rock (c)	19:06
—	Chris Jericho	Pinfall

Final; Vengeance; December 9, 2001
WWF	"Stone Cold" Steve Austin (c)	12:32
WCW	Chris Jericho (c)	Pinfall
