= WWE Championship =

Men's professional wrestling world championship

- The Undisputed WWE Championship belt with default side plates (2023–present)

Details
- Promotion: WWE
- Brand: SmackDown
- Date established: April 25, 1963
- Current champion: Sami Zayn
- Date won: September 11, 2026

Other names
- WWWF World Heavyweight Championship (1963–1971); WWWF Heavyweight Championship (1971–1979); WWF Heavyweight Championship (1979–1983); WWF World Heavyweight Championship (1983–1989); WWF Championship (1989–2001); Undisputed WWF Championship (2001–2002); Undisputed WWE Championship (2002, 2011, 2024–present) (Note: In all three instances, the "Undisputed WWE Championship" name was used in addition to or alongside the "WWE Championship" designation as a branding.); WWE Undisputed Championship (2002); WWE Championship (2002–2013, 2016–present); WWE World Heavyweight Championship (2013–2016); WWE World Championship (2016); Undisputed WWE Universal Championship (2022–2024) (Note: Name used when jointly defended with the WWE Universal Championship as a single title, while both championships continued to retain their own separate lineages.)
Statistics
- First champion: Buddy Rogers
- Most reigns: John Cena (14 reigns)
- Longest reign: Bruno Sammartino (1st reign, 2,803 days)
- Shortest reign: André the Giant (1 minute and 48 seconds)
- Oldest champion: Mr. McMahon (54 years, 21 days)
- Youngest champion: Brock Lesnar (25 years, 44 days)
- Heaviest champion: Yokozuna (568 lb (258 kg))
- Lightest champion: Rey Mysterio (175 lb (79 kg))

The WWE Championship, also referred to as the Undisputed WWE Championship since April 2024, is a men's professional wrestling world heavyweight championship created and promoted by the American promotion WWE, defended on the SmackDown brand division. It is one of two men's world titles on WWE's main roster, along with the World Heavyweight Championship on Raw. The current champion is Sami Zayn, who is in his second reign. He won the title by defeating CM Punk on the September 11, 2026, episode of SmackDown.

The original world championship of the promotion, it was established by the then-World Wide Wrestling Federation (WWWF) on April 25, 1963, as the WWWF World Heavyweight Championship, after the promotion seceded from the National Wrestling Alliance (NWA) following a dispute over the NWA World Heavyweight Championship. The inaugural champion was Buddy Rogers. In 1971, it lost its world title recognition as the company rejoined the NWA, but regained the status when they conclusively left the NWA in 1983. Since its inception, the title has undergone many name changes due to company name changes and title unifications. It is the oldest active championship in WWE, and is presented as being the promotion's most prestigious title, with many matches for the title having headlined pay-per-view and livestreaming events—including the company's flagship event WrestleMania. In professional wrestling in general, it is considered to be one of the most prestigious championships of all time.

From its inception until 2001, it was promoted as WWE's sole primary championship. An additional world title, the WCW Championship, was added after the then-World Wrestling Federation's (WWF) purchase of World Championship Wrestling (WCW) in early 2001. The titles were later unified as the Undisputed WWF Championship. After the first brand split in 2002 and the promotion being renamed to WWE, the championship became exclusive to SmackDown, dropping the "undisputed" moniker, while the World Heavyweight Championship (2002–2013 version) was created for Raw. ECW became a third brand in 2006, adding the ECW Championship. That title was deactivated in 2010, and the World Heavyweight Championship was unified into the WWE Championship in 2013. The WWE Championship was again the sole world title of WWE until the introduction of the WWE Universal Championship with the 2016 brand split and then a new World Heavyweight Championship in 2023. From April 2022 until April 2024, the WWE and Universal titles were held and defended together as the Undisputed WWE Universal Championship, maintaining their individual lineages until the Universal title was deactivated in April 2024, with the WWE title subsequently referred to as the Undisputed WWE Championship. During both brand splits, the WWE Championship has switched brands, usually as a result of the WWE Draft; the 2023 WWE Draft moved it back to SmackDown.

== History ==
=== Origin ===
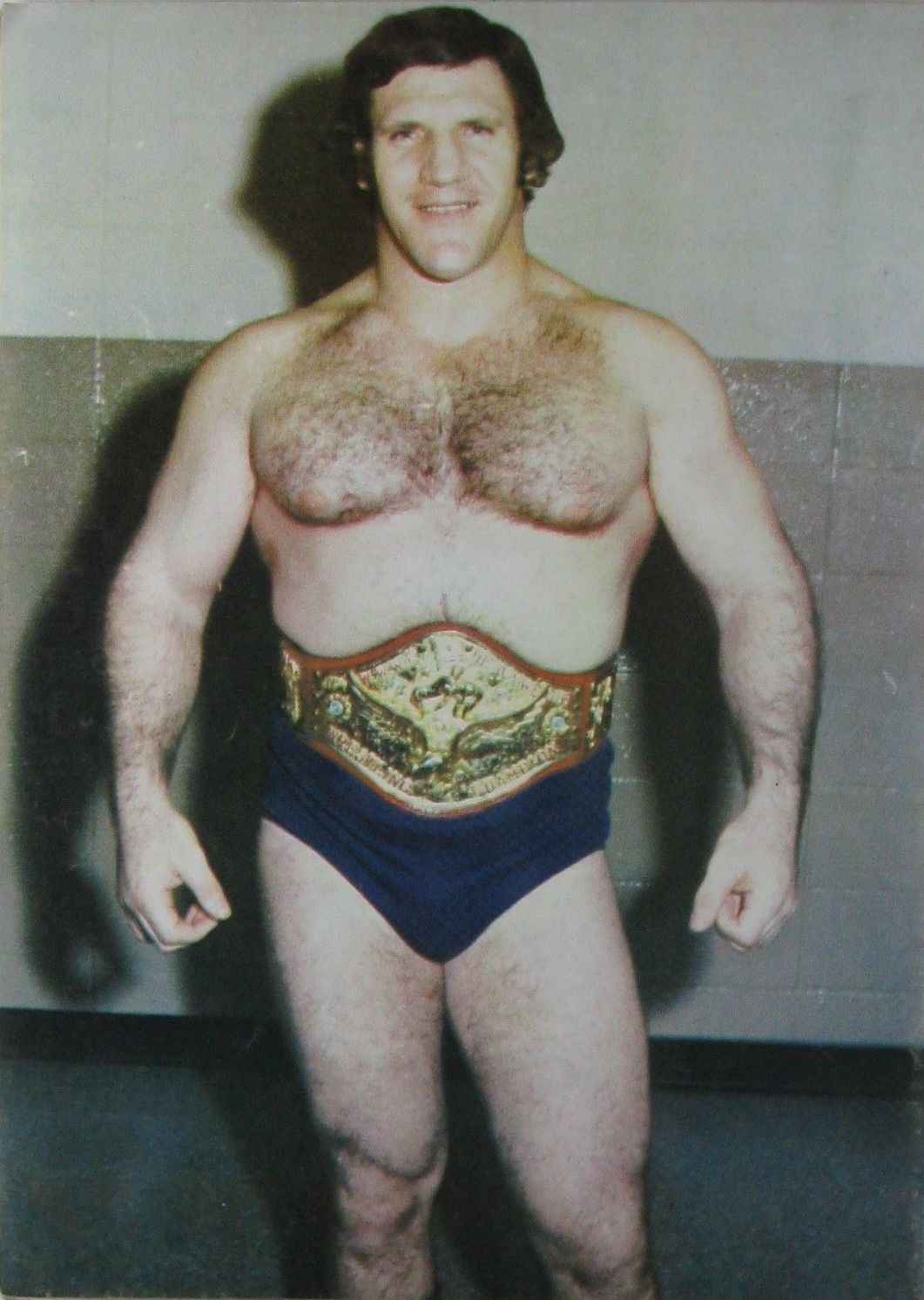
Two-time champion Bruno Sammartino. His first reign is the longest at over seven years (2,803 days) and he has the longest combined reign (4,040 days); he is pictured here in his second reign (1973–1982 belt design) when the title was known as the WWWF Heavyweight Championship.

The title was introduced in 1963 with Buddy Rogers becoming the first champion. Its backstory began in the National Wrestling Alliance (NWA), which had various territorial member professional wrestling promotions. In the 1950s, Capitol Wrestling Corporation (CWC) was a member of the NWA and by 1963, its executives held a controlling stake over NWA operations. During this time, Buddy Rogers held the NWA World Heavyweight Championship until January 24, when Lou Thesz defeated Rogers for the championship in a one-fall match. Claiming the title can only be contested in a traditional two-out-of-three falls match, CWC disputed the title change, and thus seceded from the NWA and became the World Wide Wrestling Federation (WWWF). The WWWF World Heavyweight Championship was then established and awarded to Buddy Rogers with the explanation that he won a fictional tournament in Rio de Janeiro, supposedly defeating Antonino Rocca in the finals.

After several years, the WWWF became affiliated with the NWA once again; one of the caveats of rejoining is that the championship would no longer be recognized as a "world championship", and only as a regional heavyweight championship. In 1979, the WWWF was renamed World Wrestling Federation (WWF), and then after conclusively ending its affiliation with the NWA in 1983, the title regained its "world championship" status and was renamed the WWF World Heavyweight Championship. Although the full name appeared on the championship belts until 1998, the name was often abbreviated to WWF Championship, which became its official name in 1998.

=== Monday Night War and unification ===
A diagram showing the evolution of various wrestling world championships and the way they are connected to the WWE Championship.

In 1991, World Championship Wrestling (WCW), a member of the NWA, established the WCW World Heavyweight Championship to replace the NWA's world title. In 1993, WCW seceded from the NWA and grew to become a rival promotion to the WWF. Both organizations grew into mainstream prominence and were eventually involved in a Nielsen ratings war, dubbed the "Monday Night War". Near the end of the ratings war, WCW began a financial decline, which culminated in WWF purchasing WCW in March 2001. As a result of the purchase, the WWF acquired, among other assets, WCW's championships. Thus, there were two world titles in the WWF: the original WWF Championship and the WCW Championship, which was eventually renamed the "World Championship".

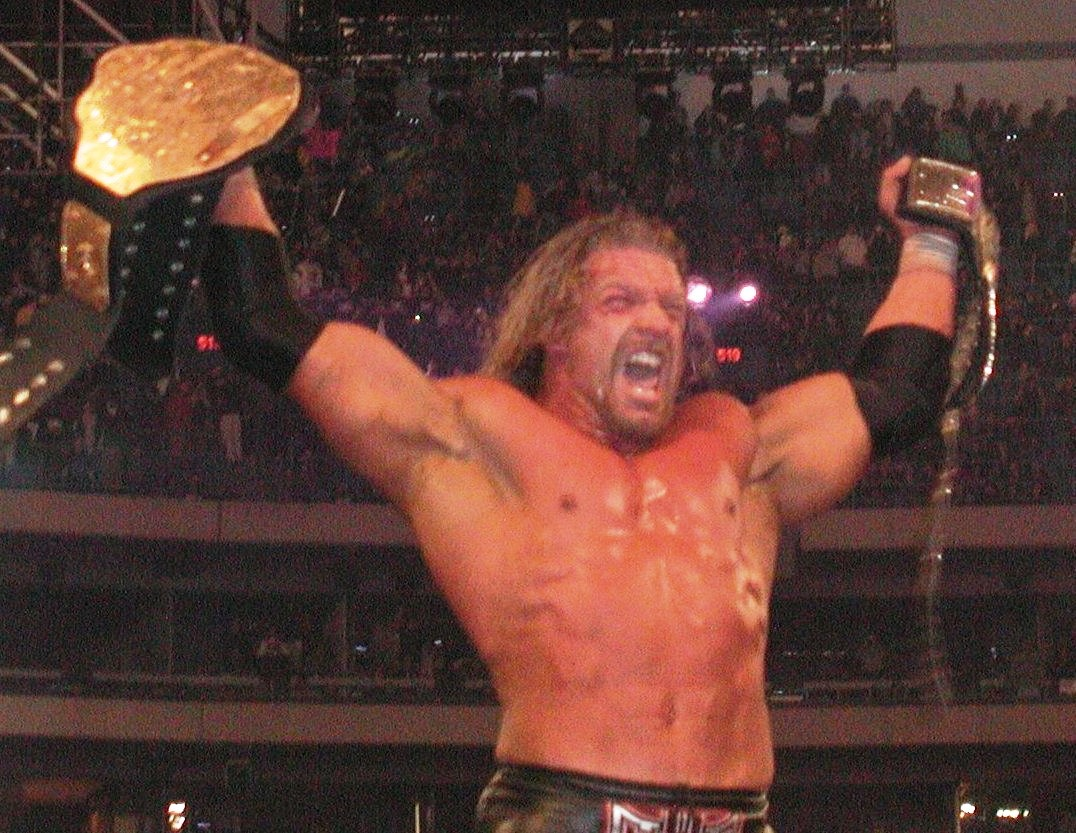
Nine-time champion Triple H shown holding the WCW Championship in his right hand, and the WWF Championship. Together, these two titles were used in tandem to represent the Undisputed WWF Championship from December 9, 2001, to April 1, 2002.

In December 2001, the two championships were unified at Vengeance. At the event, "Stone Cold" Steve Austin defeated Kurt Angle to retain the WWF Championship, while Chris Jericho defeated The Rock for the World Championship. After this, Jericho then defeated Austin, unifying the WWF and World Championships, and becoming the first Undisputed WWF Championship; the Undisputed championship retained the lineage of the WWF Championship and the World Championship was retired. Subsequently, the Big Eagle Belt (formerly representing the WWF Championship) and the Big Gold Belt (formerly representing the World Championship) were used in tandem to represent the Undisputed Championship. Jericho held the championship for four months until he lost it at WrestleMania X8 against Triple H, who was soon after presented with a single championship belt. Following the company's rebranding from WWF to WWE, the championship's name was officially changed to the Undisputed WWE Championship, and later to the WWE Undisputed Championship.

=== First brand split ===
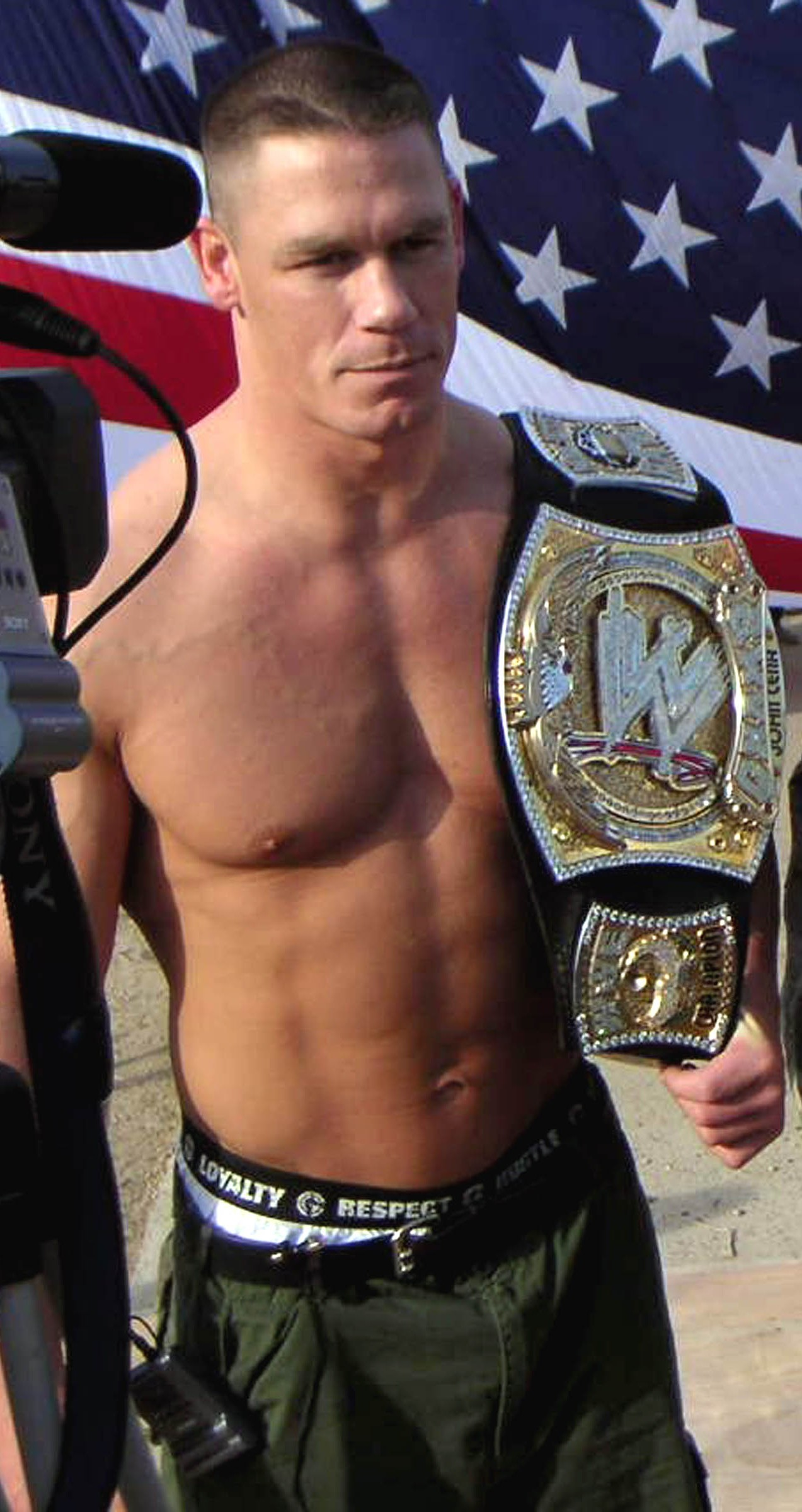
Record 14-time WWE Champion John Cena, shown with the "Spinner Belt", which was used to represent the title from 2005 to 2013.

The Undisputed Championship continued up through the beginning of the first brand split, which saw wrestlers being drafted to the company's main television programs, WWE Raw and WWE SmackDown!, each show representing the brand of the same name, with championships assigned to and authority figures appointed for each brand. The holder of the Undisputed Championship was the only male wrestler allowed to appear on both shows. In May 2002, the WWF was renamed World Wrestling Entertainment (WWE) and the championships were renamed accordingly. At first, the championship remained unaffiliated with either brand as wrestlers from both brands could challenge the champion. Following the appointment of Eric Bischoff and Stephanie McMahon as General Managers of Raw and SmackDown, respectively, Stephanie McMahon convinced then-Undisputed Champion Brock Lesnar to become exclusive to the SmackDown brand, leaving the Raw brand without a world title. On September 2, Bischoff disputed Lesnar's status as champion, stating Lesnar was refusing to defend his title against the designated No. 1 contender, Triple H, and awarded the latter with the newly created World Heavyweight Championship. Immediately afterward, Lesnar's championship dropped the epithet "Undisputed" and became known as the WWE Championship.

Over the course of the first brand split, the WWE Championship was used as the world title of the SmackDown brand twice and of the Raw brand three times. In all but two cases, the WWE Championship switched brands as a result of the annual WWE draft. In June 2006, WWE established ECW as a third brand, on which former Extreme Championship Wrestling stars and newer talent competed. When ECW's Rob Van Dam won the WWE Championship at ECW One Night Stand on June 11, 2006, the championship briefly became a world title of the ECW brand; the ECW World Heavyweight Championship was subsequently reactivated for the ECW brand upon Van Dam's title win. Van Dam held both titles until he lost the WWE Championship to Raw's Edge the following month. The ECW brand was disbanded in 2010, subsequently deactivating the ECW Championship. In April 2011, WWE ceased going by its full name with the "WWE" abbreviation becoming an orphaned initialism, and the first brand split ended that August.

Just prior to the end of the first brand split, a storyline saw CM Punk vowing to leave the company with the WWE Championship when his contract expired on July 17, 2011, the date of the 2011 Money in the Bank pay-per-view. At the event, Punk succeeded in defeating the defending champion John Cena to win the title, and left the company with the physical championship belt. Subsequently, the championship was vacated and Rey Mysterio won an eight-man tournament by defeating The Miz in the finals to be crowned the new WWE Champion, only to subsequently lose it later that night to Cena, for the latter's record ninth reign. Punk then returned to WWE with his own championship belt, disputing Cena's claim to the title. The two WWE Champions wrestled each other at SummerSlam in what was billed as a match for the "Undisputed WWE Championship"; Punk defeated Cena (the de facto interim champion) to solidify his claim on the title, but Alberto Del Rio immediately cashed in his Money in the Bank contract to capture the undisputed championship.

=== Reunification and second brand split ===
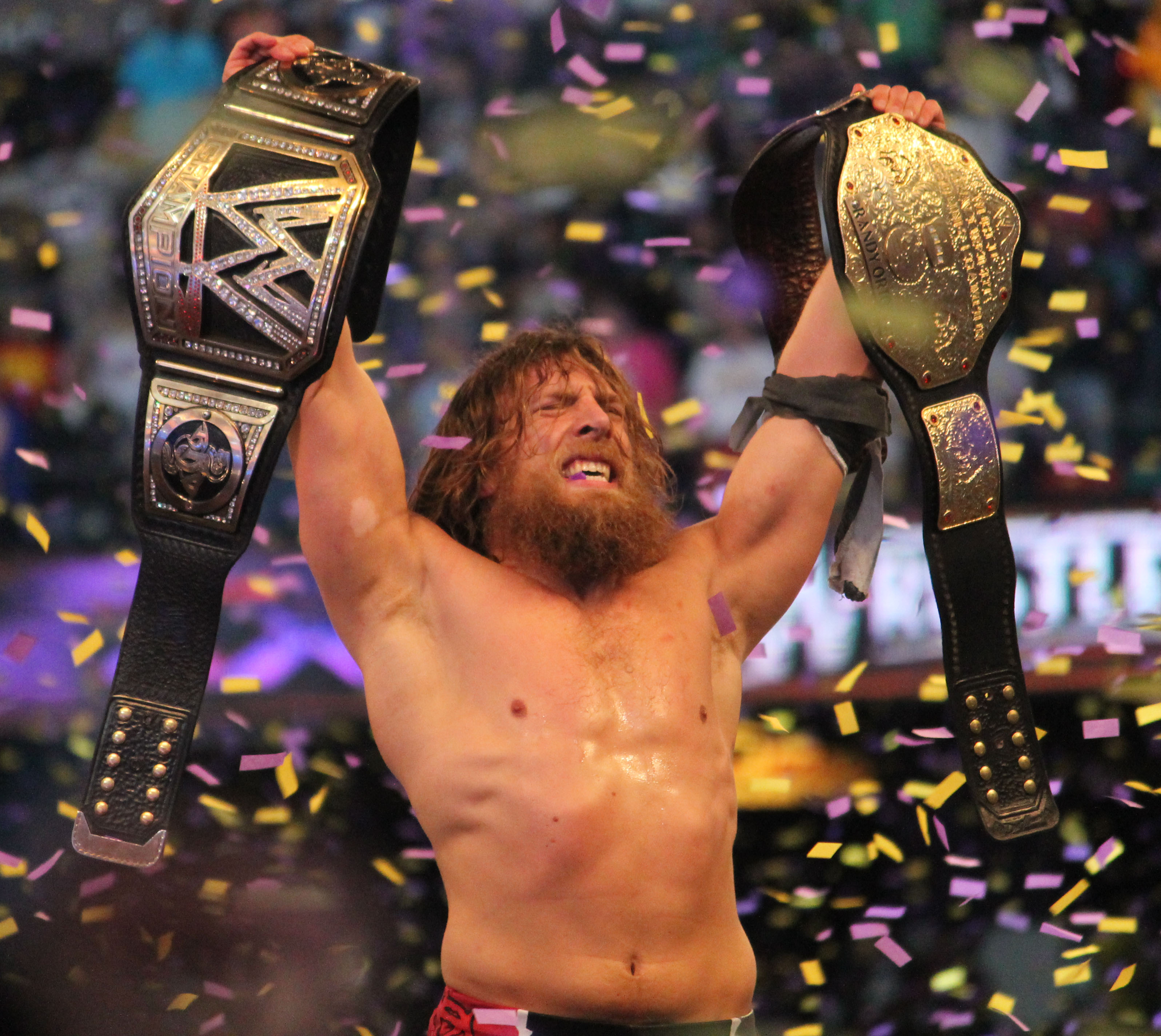
Four-time champion Daniel Bryan, shown with the 2013–2014 version of the WWE Championship belt (in his right hand) and the World Heavyweight Championship, which were used in tandem to represent the WWE World Heavyweight Championship from December 2013 to August 2014

Following the end of the first brand split in August 2011, both the WWE Champion and World Heavyweight Champion could appear on both Raw and SmackDown. In November 2013, the night after Survivor Series, reigning World Heavyweight Champion John Cena made a challenge to reigning WWE Champion Randy Orton to determine WWE's undisputed world champion. Orton defeated Cena in a TLC match at the TLC: Tables, Ladders & Chairs pay-per-view on December 15, 2013, to unify the titles. Subsequently, the unified championship was renamed WWE World Heavyweight Championship and retained the lineage of the WWE Championship; the World Heavyweight Championship was retired. Orton and subsequent champions held both championship belts until a single championship belt was given to reigning champion Brock Lesnar in August 2014.

After Dean Ambrose became champion in June 2016, the title's name was reverted to WWE Championship. In light of the return of the brand split the following month, Ambrose was moved to SmackDown as part of the 2016 WWE Draft. Ambrose then retained his title at Battleground on July 24 against Raw draftees Seth Rollins and Roman Reigns, making the title exclusive to SmackDown. On the July 25 episode of Raw, to address the lack of a world title for the brand, the WWE Universal Championship was created; Finn Bálor became the inaugural champion at SummerSlam. After the unveiling of the Universal title, the WWE Championship was renamed WWE World Championship, but reverted to WWE Championship in December 2016 during AJ Styles' first reign.

The title changed hands for the first time outside of North America when AJ Styles defeated Jinder Mahal to win his second WWE Championship in Manchester, England on the November 7, 2017, episode of SmackDown. This was also the first time in nearly 15 years that the championship changed hands on an episode of SmackDown; the last time was in 2003 when Brock Lesnar defeated Kurt Angle for the title. At Crown Jewel on October 31, 2019, SmackDown wrestler "The Fiend" Bray Wyatt won the Universal Championship, thus transferring the title to SmackDown. Also at that event, after reigning WWE Champion Brock Lesnar had defeated Cain Velasquez to retain the title, he was attacked by Raw's Rey Mysterio, who Lesnar had attacked a few weeks prior. The following night on Friday Night SmackDown, Lesnar quit SmackDown and went to Raw to continue his feud with Mysterio, thus transferring the WWE Championship to Raw.

=== Universal Championship coexistence ===
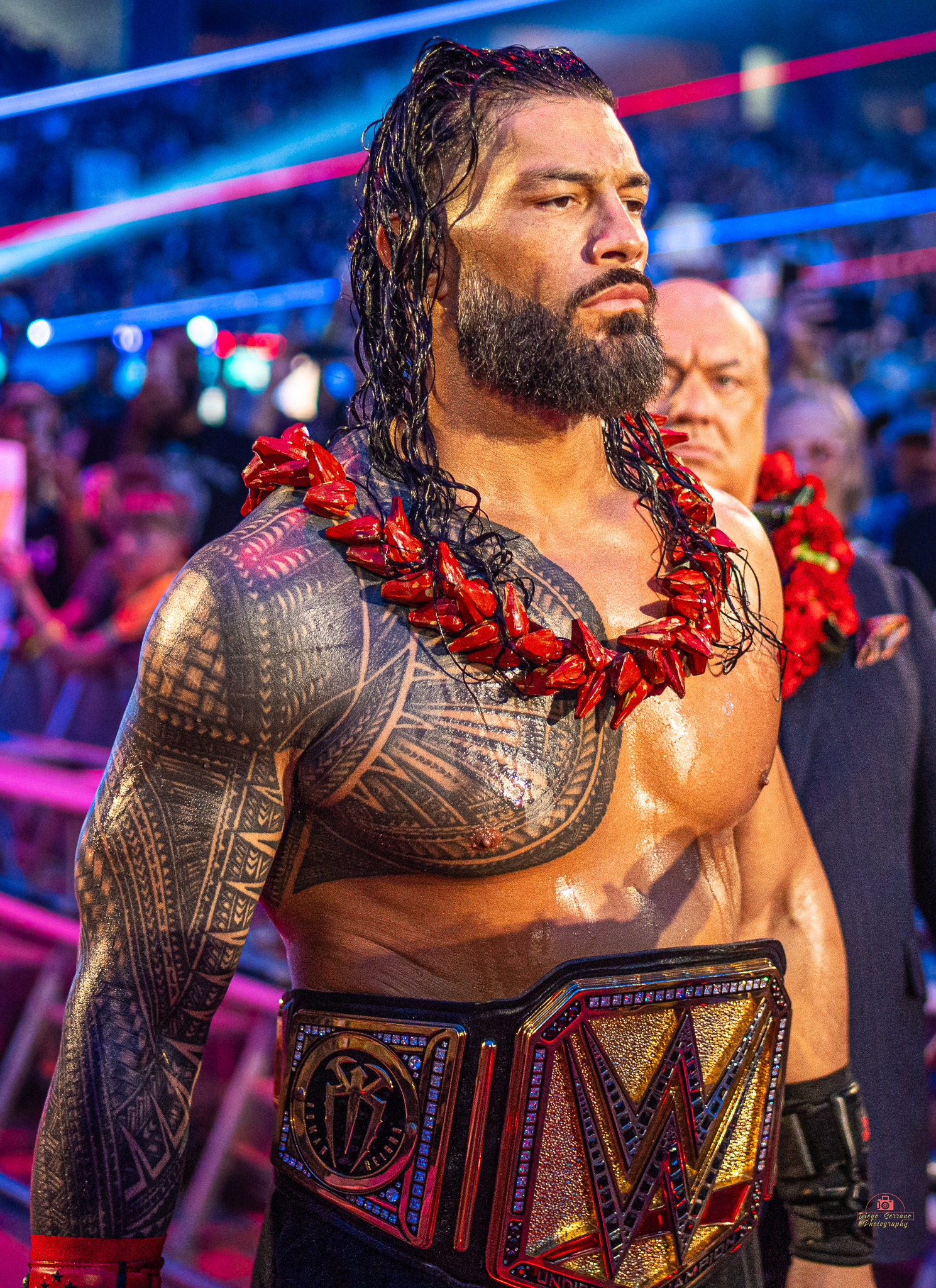
Four-time champion Roman Reigns with the Undisputed WWE Championship belt (2023–present), which originally represented both the WWE and Universal Championships as the Undisputed WWE Universal Championship. After Reigns lost the title to Cody Rhodes in April 2024, the Universal Championship was officially retired, and the belt now solely represents the WWE Championship.

At WrestleMania 38 Night 2 on April 3, 2022, SmackDown's Universal Champion Roman Reigns defeated reigning WWE Champion Brock Lesnar in a Winner Takes All match to claim both world championships. WWE promoted Reigns as a double champion, defending both titles together across both brands as the Undisputed WWE Universal Championship. On the April 24, 2023, episode of Raw, WWE Chief Content Officer Triple H announced that regardless of what brand Reigns was drafted to in the 2023 WWE Draft, he and his undisputed championship would become exclusive to that brand. Triple H subsequently unveiled a new World Heavyweight Championship for the opposing brand, which was won by Seth Rollins at Night of Champions. As Reigns was drafted to SmackDown, the World Heavyweight Championship became exclusive to Raw.

On the June 2, 2023, episode of SmackDown, Triple H presented Reigns with a new singular championship belt to represent the Undisputed WWE Universal Championship. Amidst confusion of the lineages, Fightful reported that WWE confirmed to them that the two championships were still in fact separate lineages, represented by one belt. This was also represented on WWE.com, with both Reigns and Cody Rhodes, who defeated Reigns at WrestleMania XL, being listed as champions of both individual titles; however, after Rhodes defeated Reigns, the title began to be referred to as the Undisputed WWE Championship. The following year, after John Cena defeated Rhodes at WrestleMania 41, the Universal Championship's lineage was amended, retiring the title with Reigns recognized as its final champion. Reflecting the combined lineage of the WWE and Universal titles and for marketing purposes, the WWE Championship continues to be referred to as the Undisputed WWE Championship.

== Brand designation history ==
With the first brand split, an annual draft was established in 2002. Each year (except 2003), the General Managers participated in a draft lottery in which select members of WWE's roster were assigned to a brand. The revived ECW became a third brand from 2006 to 2010. On August 29, 2011, WWE ended the brand extension and wrestlers (including all champions), were then free to appear on any program. On July 19, 2016, SmackDown moved to Tuesdays and became a live show with its own set of wrestlers and writers, separate from Raw, thus reintroducing the brand split. The draft took place on the live premiere of SmackDown. On the July 18 episode of Raw, SmackDown Commissioner Shane McMahon named Daniel Bryan the SmackDown General Manager and Raw Commissioner Stephanie McMahon named Mick Foley the Raw General Manager.

Transitions of the WWE Championship between the Raw, SmackDown, and ECW brands
Date of transition	Brand	Notes
August 26, 2002	SmackDown!	WWE Undisputed Champion Brock Lesnar signed with SmackDown!, making the title exclusive to the brand.; The title was renamed to WWE Championship after the original World Heavyweight Championship was established for Raw.
June 6, 2005	Raw	WWE Champion John Cena was drafted to Raw in the 2005 WWE Draft Lottery.
June 11, 2006	ECW	Following WWE's revival of Extreme Championship Wrestling as a third brand dubbed ECW, Rob Van Dam was chosen by ECW representative Paul Heyman to move to the new brand.; At ECW One Night Stand, Van Dam cashed in his Money in the Bank contract and defeated John Cena to win the WWE Championship, thus transferring the title to ECW.; The ECW World Heavyweight Championship was reactivated and awarded to Van Dam, who held both titles.
July 3, 2006	Raw	The WWE Championship was returned to Raw after Edge defeated Rob Van Dam and John Cena.
June 23, 2008	SmackDown	WWE Champion Triple H was drafted to SmackDown in the 2008 WWE Draft.
April 13, 2009	Raw	WWE Champion Triple H was drafted back to Raw in the 2009 WWE Draft.
August 29, 2011	—N/a	End of first brand split.; The WWE Champion could appear on both Raw and SmackDown.; The WWE Championship and the World Heavyweight Championship were unified in December 2013, with the World Heavyweight Championship retired as a result.
July 19, 2016	SmackDown	Reintroduction of the brand split.; WWE Champion Dean Ambrose was drafted to SmackDown in the 2016 WWE Draft.
November 1, 2019	Raw	WWE Champion Brock Lesnar quit SmackDown and transferred to Raw.
April 28, 2023	SmackDown	Undisputed WWE Universal Champion Roman Reigns was drafted to SmackDown in the 2023 WWE Draft.; The WWE Championship has then been referred to as the Undisputed WWE Championship since April 2024, when the Universal Championship was retired.

== Belt designs ==
=== 1963–1982 ===
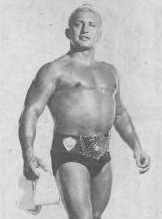
Inaugural champion Buddy Rogers with the original title belt used to represent the then-WWWF World Heavyweight Championship

When introduced in 1963, the original WWWF World Heavyweight Championship was represented by a United States championship belt that Buddy Rogers had defended in various territories prior to becoming the inaugural WWWF world champion. The center plate of this belt was an outline of the continental United States and there were two shield-shaped side plates with grapplers on them; the plates were on a red leather strap. On the center plate, there was a circle flanked by grapplers, and the circle was designed to contain a photograph of the titleholder. Above the circle was a shield with an eagle atop it with stars on opposite sides of the shield. The caption "World's Champion" was added below the circle. This title belt was worn by the inaugural champion Buddy Rogers in 1963 and the second champion Bruno Sammartino.

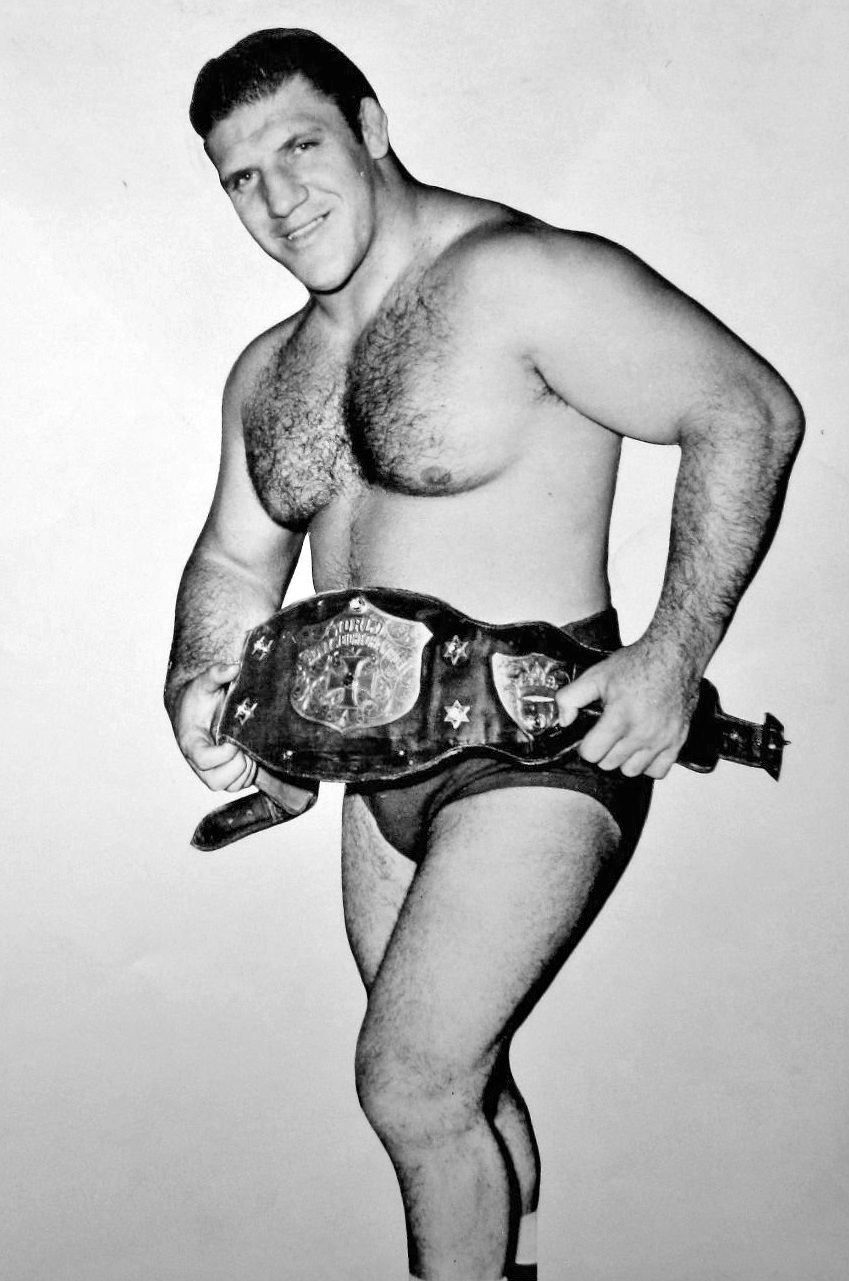
Bruno Sammartino holding the 1971–1972 version of the WWWF Heavyweight Championship belt

After Sammartino became champion, a new title belt on a blue strap was created and used until 1965. The enlarged center piece contained a crowned globe and two grapplers, and read "WWWF World Champion"; the two side plates commemorated Sammartino's title win. This belt was stolen in September 1965; a new belt was created with a mostly similar design with a couple of minor differences with the design of the side plates. This is the most recognizable version of Sammartino's belt that was used until 1971 and has been called the "holy grail of professional wrestling artifacts". After defeating Sammartino in January 1971, Ivan Koloff held Sammartino's belt for three weeks before losing it to Pedro Morales.

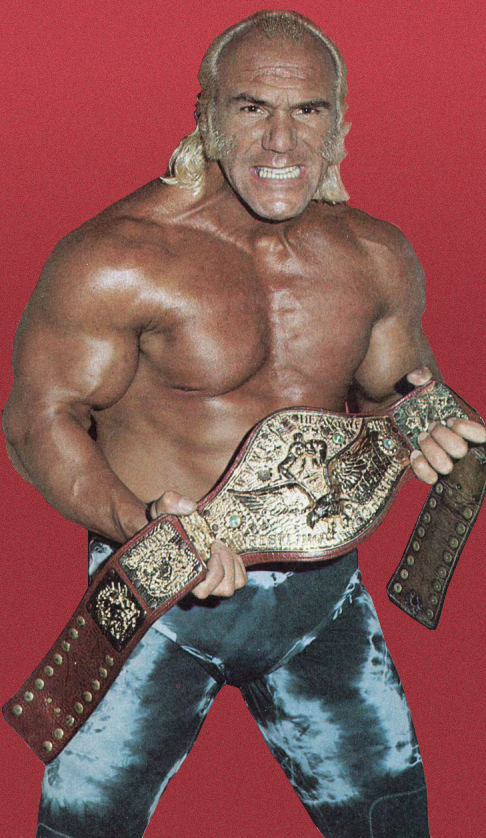
"Superstar" Billy Graham with his red leather variation of the then-WWWF Heavyweight Championship in 1977

During Morales's reign, the championship belt was updated three times. First in 1971, this design was on an indigo colored strap and contained three shield-shaped plates. Below the center plate, which read "World Heavyweight Champion" and had a cross at its center, a separate horizontal plate read "WWWF". This was replaced with another design in 1972. This version, on a red strap, read "WWWF Heavyweight Wrestling Champion" around the edges with an eagle at the center, while six side plates represented several countries. 1973 saw the introduction of another yet similar design; this one was on a black strap and contained two grapplers above a differently designed eagle. This version was subsequently held by Stan Stasiak, Bruno Sammartino, "Superstar" Billy Graham (who wore a red leather variation), and Bob Backlund. During the latter's reign, the promotion's name was shortened to World Wrestling Federation (WWF), but the physical championship belt still read "WWWF".

=== 1982–2005 ===
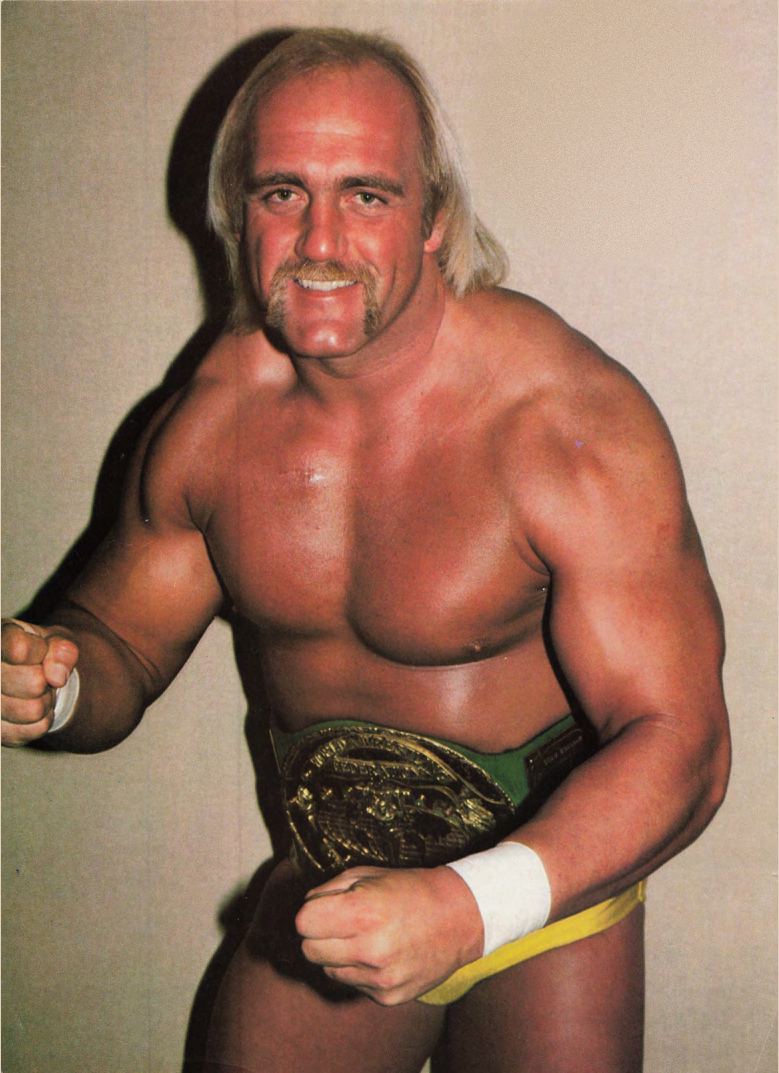
Six-time champion Hulk Hogan with the "Big Green Belt" (1983–1984) version of the then-WWF World Heavyweight Championship

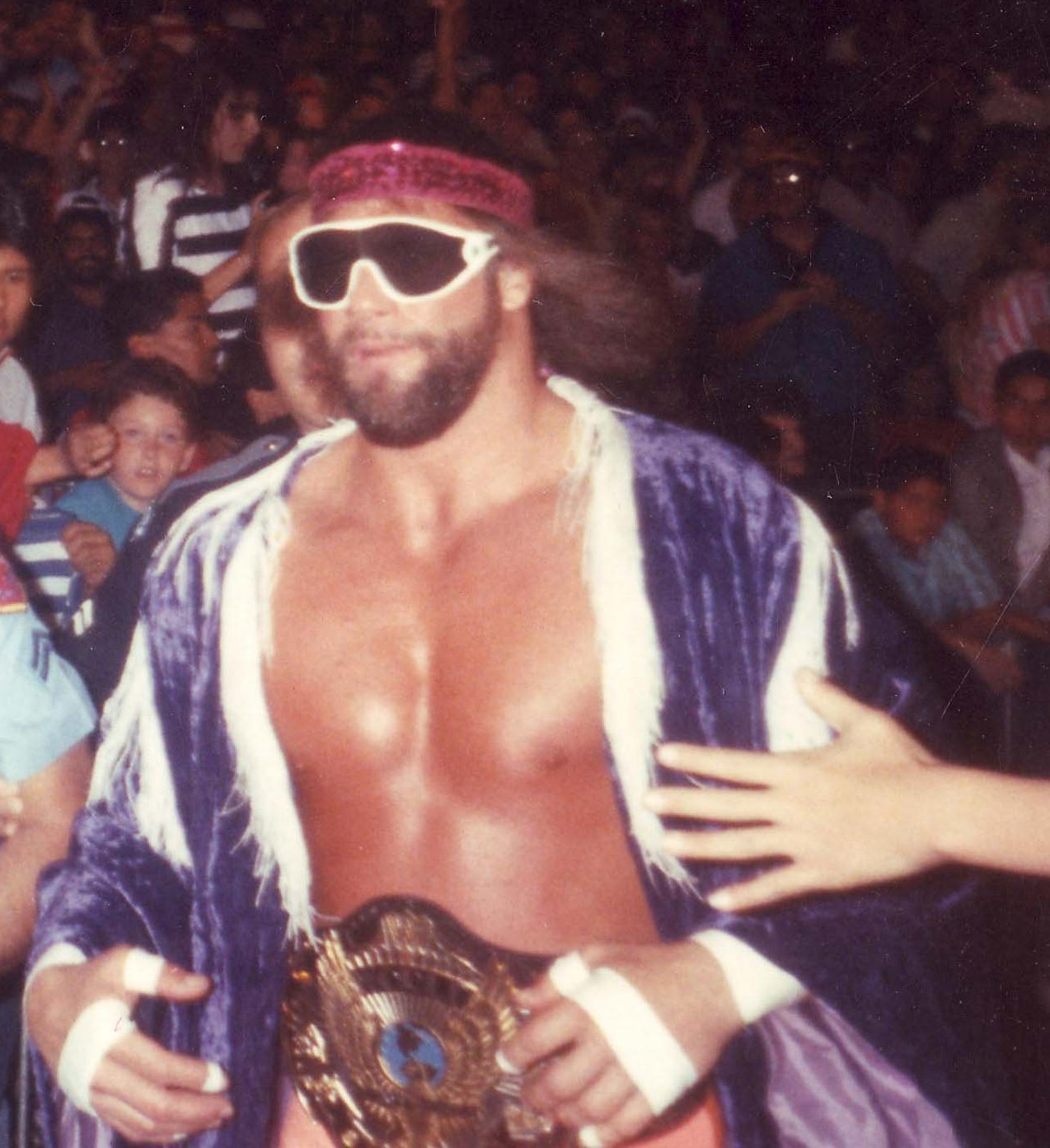
Two-time champion Randy Savage with the "Winged Eagle" (1988–1998) version of the then-WWF Championship

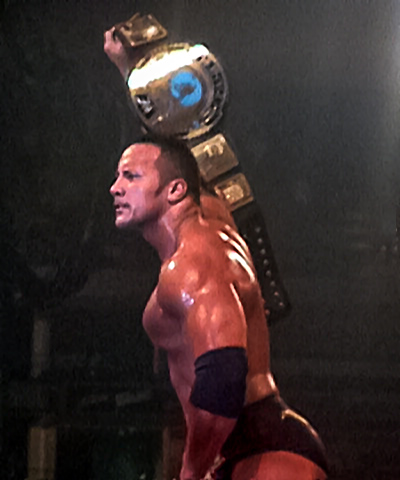
Eight-time champion The Rock with the "Big Eagle" and "Attitude Era" (1998–2002) version of the then-WWF Championship; this design was used in tandem with the "Big Gold Belt" to represent the Undisputed Championship from December 2001 until April 2002.

After the previous design was destroyed, a new design was introduced in January 1983, nicknamed the "Big Green Belt" due to its size and the color of its strap. This was the first to be created under the WWF name. It included eight (later 10) side plates dedicated to the previous champions. The center plate featured a wrestler holding up a championship belt with a globe behind him. This design, held by Bob Backlund, The Iron Sheik, and Hulk Hogan, was replaced first by the "Hogan '84" design during the spring of 1984, then by the nearly identical "Hogan '85" design, which first appeared at WrestleMania 1. Both were called "Hogan belts" as they were only worn by Hulk Hogan, and they were similar in design to the NWA Television Championship at the time. The '84 belt consisted of a dual-plated gold and silver main plate as well as two dual-plated side plates on each side. The main plate was engraved with red lettering. The '85 belt had a silver and black main plate with raised silver lettering and the same side plates as the '84 belt. Both belts included black straps. Both center plates read "WWF" at the top, below that was an eagle with two banners below it reading "World Heavyweight Wrestling Champion". The bottom read "World Wrestling Federation" and above that was a name plate commemorating Hogan's title win, while the side plates noted previous champions. In October 1985, a new belt was introduced and was again only worn by Hogan. This belt is erroneously known as the "Hogan '86" belt. The center plate featured a globe in the center, along with Roman columns and olive branches. It read "World Heavyweight Wrestling Champion" and included the famous WWF block logo at the top, while four side plates had flags (two flags per side plate) representing the United States, Canada, Mexico, Japan, the United Kingdom, Australia, the Soviet Union, and Italy.

On February 5, 1988, just before ending his first championship reign, Hogan introduced another new design, the "Winged Eagle" championship belt, which became the primary design for the next decade with many wrestlers holding this version, and is considered the most popular design of the championship. Its nickname is derived from the eagle's wings seemingly coming off of the center plate, which included the block WWF logo and read "World Heavyweight Wrestling Champion". The championship belt also had four identical side plates. Apart from the usual black leather strap, Ultimate Warrior wore white, light blue, yellow, and purple variations, with the latter also worn by Sgt. Slaughter. In March 1998, after "Stone Cold" Steve Austin became champion, he was presented with a new design, often dubbed the "Big Eagle" or "Attitude Era" championship belt. The center plate was similar to the previous design, but became fully rounded, and the side plates were updated with the inner side plates containing the McMahon family crest of a lion holding a shield that had the WWF logo. When it was unveiled, it originally contained the block WWF logo and was on a blue strap, but was updated in November 1998 to the WWF scratch logo and on a black strap. In addition to the logo, it read "World Wrestling Federation Champion".

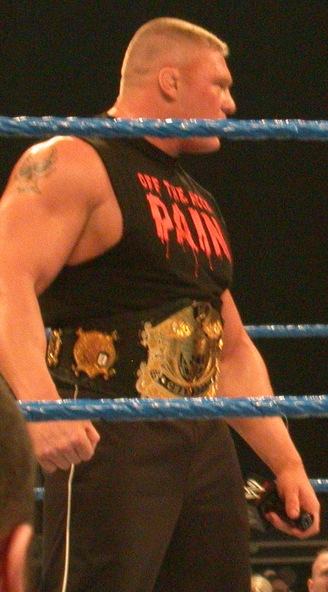
Seven-time champion Brock Lesnar with the WWE Undisputed Championship belt (2002–2005); he was the last to hold this as the Undisputed Championship as the title became the WWE Championship in September 2002.

After Chris Jericho unified the WWF and World Championships into the Undisputed WWF Championship, the "Big Eagle" championship belt was used in tandem with the "Big Gold Belt", the former WCW Championship belt, until a single Undisputed Championship belt was introduced to champion Triple H on the April 1, 2002, episode of Raw. This new belt, dubbed the "Undisputed Championship Belt", was designed by New York-based tattoo artist Keith Ciaramello. Taking inspiration from WCW, this design included a name plate, and like the previous two designs, it had an eagle atop the globe. There were also stars seemingly shooting out from the globe. It originally had the WWF scratch logo and read "World Wrestling Federation Champion"; after the promotion was renamed World Wrestling Entertainment (WWE) in May 2002, both the scratch logo and wording were changed accordingly. The inner side plates on this design also contained the McMahon family crest of a lion holding a shield that had the company logo. The championship would drop the "undisputed" moniker in September 2002, becoming the WWE Championship again when it became exclusive to SmackDown, while the Big Gold Belt was resurrected to represent the World Heavyweight Championship for Raw.

=== 2005–2014 ===
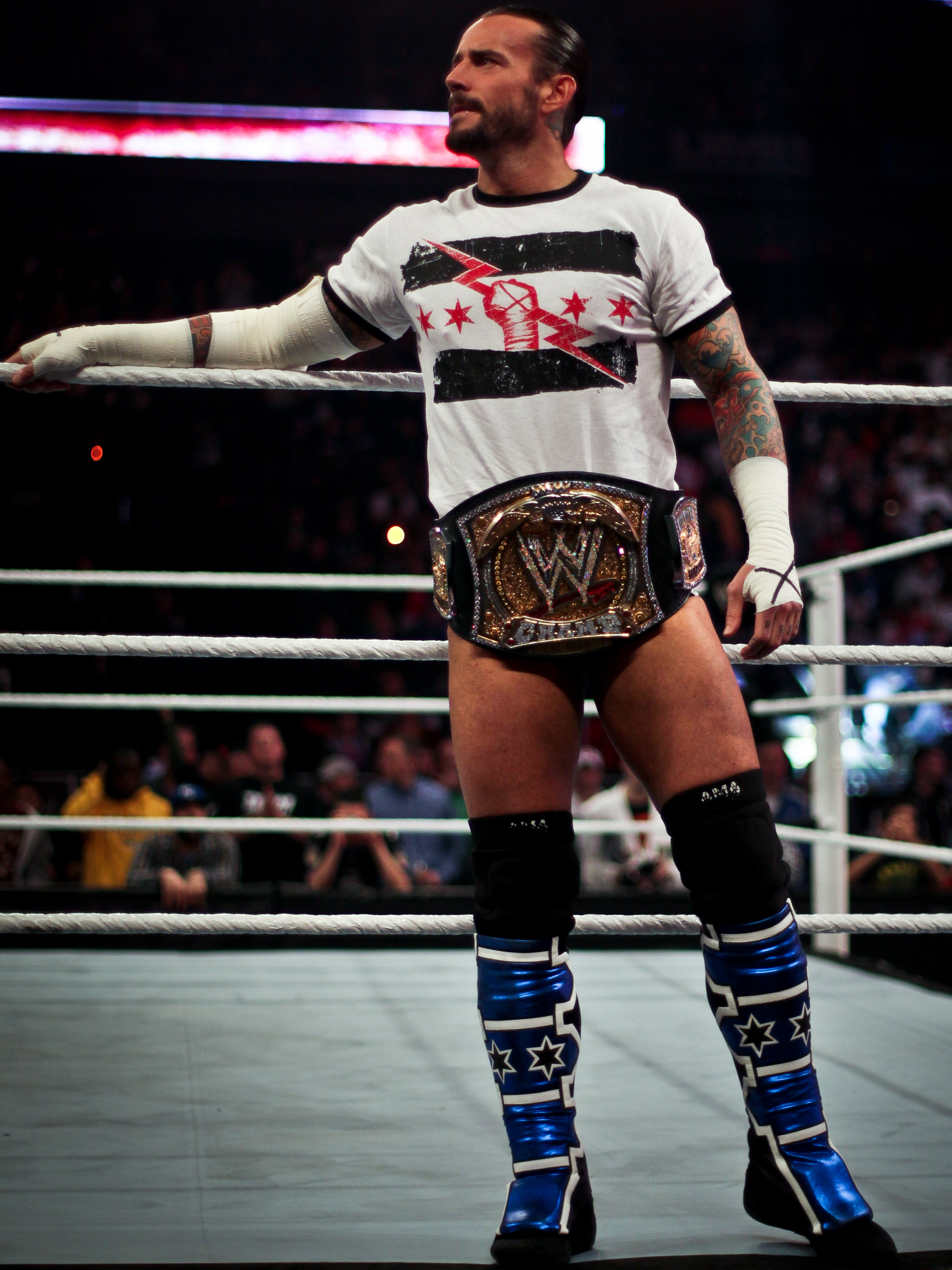
Three-time champion CM Punk wearing the "Spinner Belt" (2005–2013) version of the WWE Championship

After winning the WWE Championship in April 2005, John Cena introduced his own custom belt, the "Spinner Belt", which had a gold and diamond bling-bling style reflecting his hip hop character at the time. Although originally a custom belt for Cena, it became the WWE Championship's primary design from April 12, 2005, until February 18, 2013. The scratch WWE logo, placed between an eagle on top and the word "Champ" and a name plate below, could be spun like spinner wheels or a turntable in keeping with the hip-hop theme. The WWE logo was encrusted with diamonds while other parts of the championship were emblazoned with various other jewels. The inner side plates read "WWE Champion", though before 2008, one side plate indicated the brand the title was designated to. The spinning function was phased out in later years and the logo set in a fixed place, most notably during The Miz's first reign (2010–2011) when the logo was turned upside down to look like an "M".

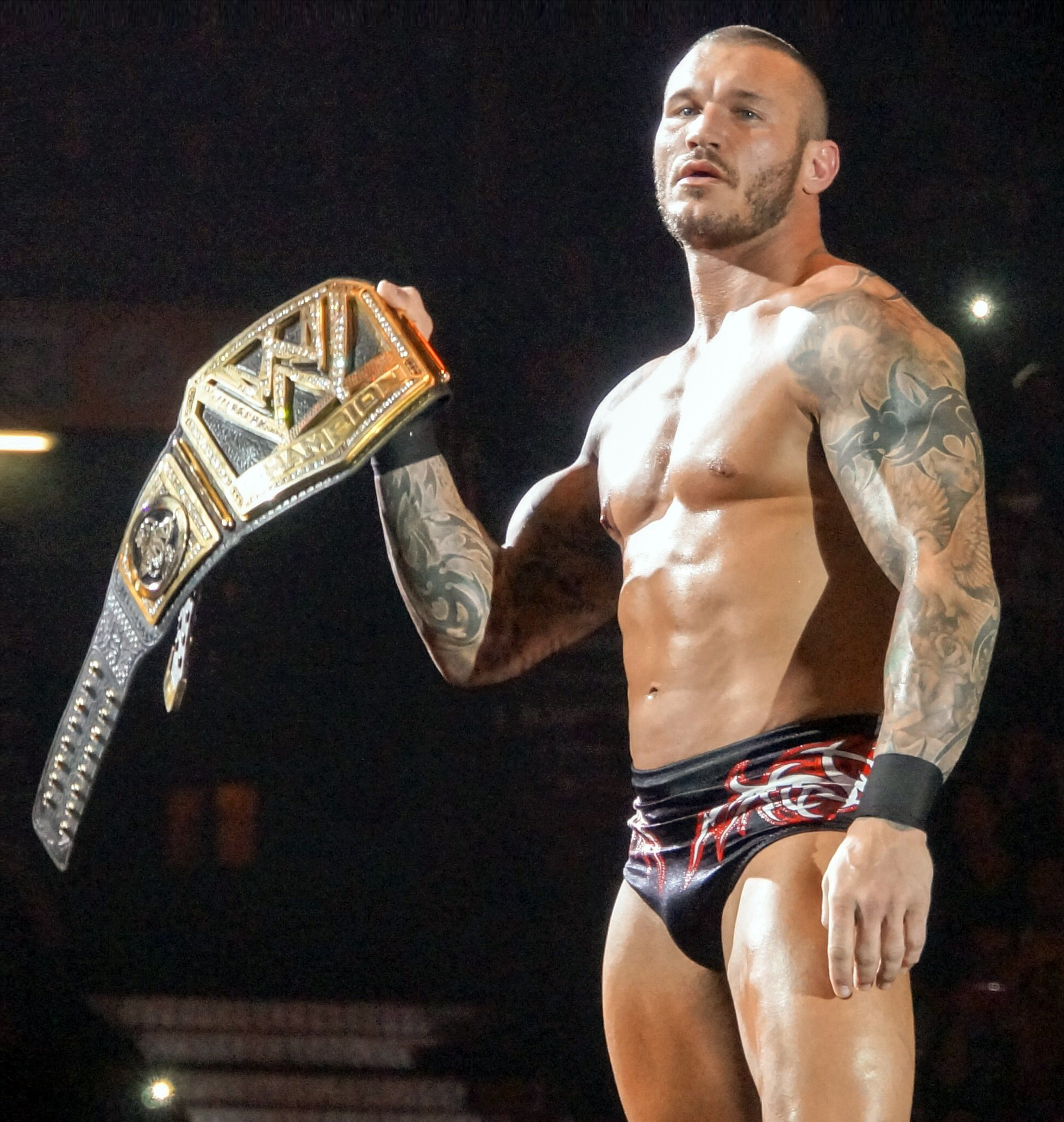
10-time champion Randy Orton with the "Big Logo" (2013–2014) version of the WWE Championship; He holds the second-most reigns with the title.

On the February 18, 2013, episode of Raw, The Rock unveiled a new WWE Championship belt, often dubbed the "Big Logo Belt". The new title was partially designed by Orange County Choppers of American Chopper fame, as well as well-known belt maker Dave Millican. The championship included a large cut-out of the scratch WWE logo (encrusted with diamonds) inside a large irregular heptagonal plate, with the border of the plate featuring diamonds and other gems. The backing behind the logo was the black leather strap itself with a nugget texture. The word "Champion" appeared in a large gold banner underneath the logo. Gold divider bars separated the center plate from its two large side plates. The side plates featured a removable center section that could be customized with the champion's logo in lieu of a nameplate; the default side plates consisted of a red globe with the WWE logo on the globe underneath a crown. After Randy Orton unified the WWE Championship and World Heavyweight Championship, with the latter being retired, the "Big Logo Belt" was used in tandem with the "Big Gold Belt" to represent the renamed WWE World Heavyweight Championship.

=== 2014–2023 ===
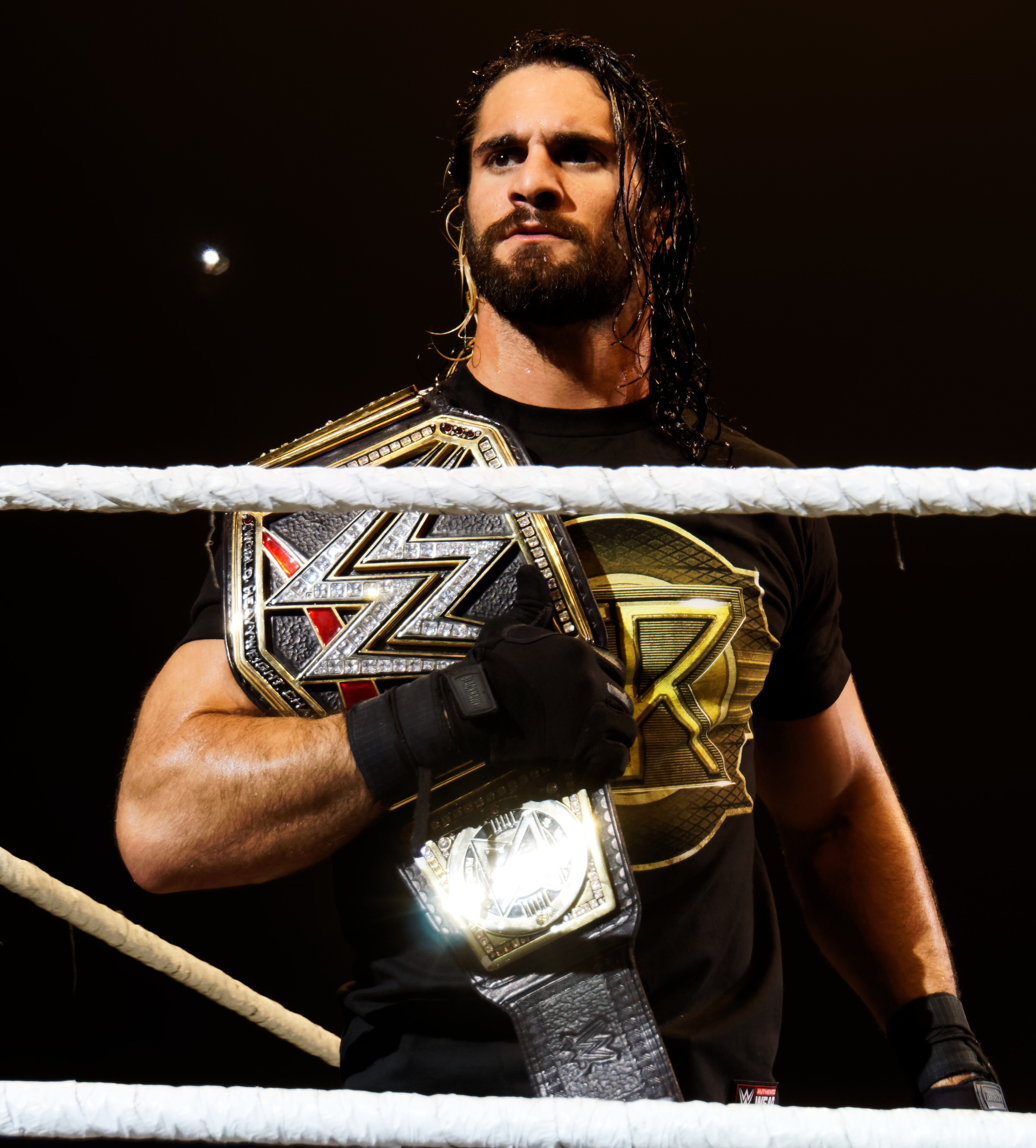
Two-time champion Seth Rollins with the "Network Logo" belt (2014–2023); he was the first person to cash in the Money in the Bank Contract at WrestleMania, resulting in his first WWE Championship victory.

On the August 18, 2014, episode of Raw, reigning champion Brock Lesnar, who had won the title the night before at SummerSlam, was presented with a single championship belt, retiring the Big Gold Belt in the process. This new standard belt, often dubbed the "Network Logo" belt, had a slightly updated design from the belt introduced by The Rock in 2013 as a result of WWE changing their corporate logo to the one originally used for the WWE Network, which had launched earlier that year in February. It included a large center plate dominated by a cut out of the WWE logo (encrusted with diamonds) inside an irregular heptagon with the capital words "World Heavyweight Champion" along the bottom edges, in very small print. The backing behind the logo was again the black leather strap with nugget texture. The belt retained the gold divider bars introduced in the previous design. The large side plates, like the previous design, included removable round center sections, allowing the holder's personal logo to be added to the championship belt; the default plates showed gold and red world maps with the WWE logo over them but without the crown from the previous design.

Over the subsequent years, customizable side plates would be integrated onto WWE's other championship belts, with all of their championships utilizing them by 2024. The "Network Logo" design would become a blueprint for WWE's men's and women's world championships, with the only differences being the name at the bottom of the center plate and the colors, as well as the women's being smaller. First was the WWE Women's Championship in April 2016, which became the Raw Women's Championship later that year, although it reverted to its original name in June 2023. After the WWE World Heavyweight Championship became exclusive to SmackDown as a result of the 2016 brand split, the same design would be used for the WWE Universal Championship that was introduced for the Raw brand. The design was also used for the SmackDown Women's Championship introduced in August, until that title received a new design in June 2023 when it was renamed Women's World Championship. The NXT United Kingdom Championship and NXT UK Women's Championship belts also used the same base outline but with a different design on the center plate itself.

After the introduction of the Universal Championship, the WWE World Heavyweight Championship subsequently reverted to being called the WWE Championship. From July to December 2016, it was called the "WWE World Championship", although the physical belt retained the text "World Heavyweight Champion". During AJ Styles's first reign in late 2017, a rare version of the belt featuring a black swoosh behind the WWE logo briefly appeared on an episode of SmackDown, but reverted to the standard red swoosh in subsequent appearances.

=== 2023–present ===
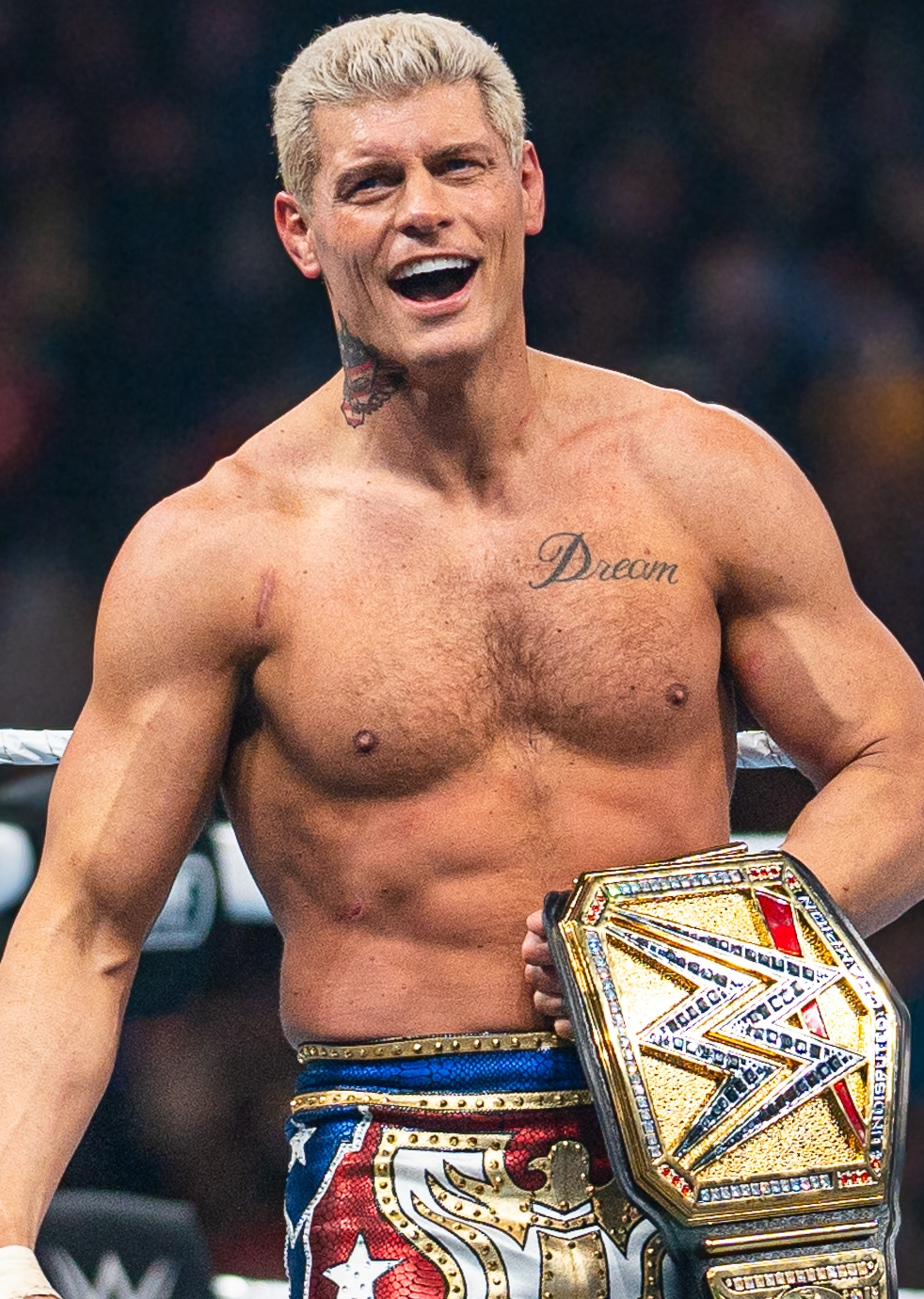
Three-time champion Cody Rhodes holding the Undisputed WWE Championship belt (2023–present); he was the first to hold this version after the WWE Universal Championship was retired, making the belt exclusively represent the WWE Championship.

After Roman Reigns became the Undisputed WWE Universal Champion at WrestleMania 38 in April 2022, both the standard versions of the WWE Championship and Universal Championship belts were used in tandem to represent the undisputed title, although both titles retained their individual lineages. On the June 2, 2023, episode of SmackDown, in celebration of Reigns reaching 1,000 days as Universal Champion, he was presented with a new single title belt to represent the Undisputed WWE Universal Championship. It features the same "Network Logo" design on a black strap, but the WWE logo is encrusted with black diamonds, it has a gold nugget-textured background behind the logo which was made as part of the metal plate instead of colored leather, and the text at the bottom of the plate says "Undisputed Champion"; the side plates remained the same. Despite this, his manager Paul Heyman had continued to carry around the previous WWE and Universal Championship belts until the end of July.

On WWE's website, pictures of the previous title belts were still used for the individual title histories of each championship until April 2024 when the Undisputed WWE Universal Championship (truncated to Undisputed WWE Championship in April 2024) belt replaced the image for the WWE Championship; the Universal Championship title history remained a picture of the previous blue belt. The Undisputed belt design would continue to be used to represent the WWE Championship after the Universal Championship was officially retired in April 2024.

=== Custom belts ===
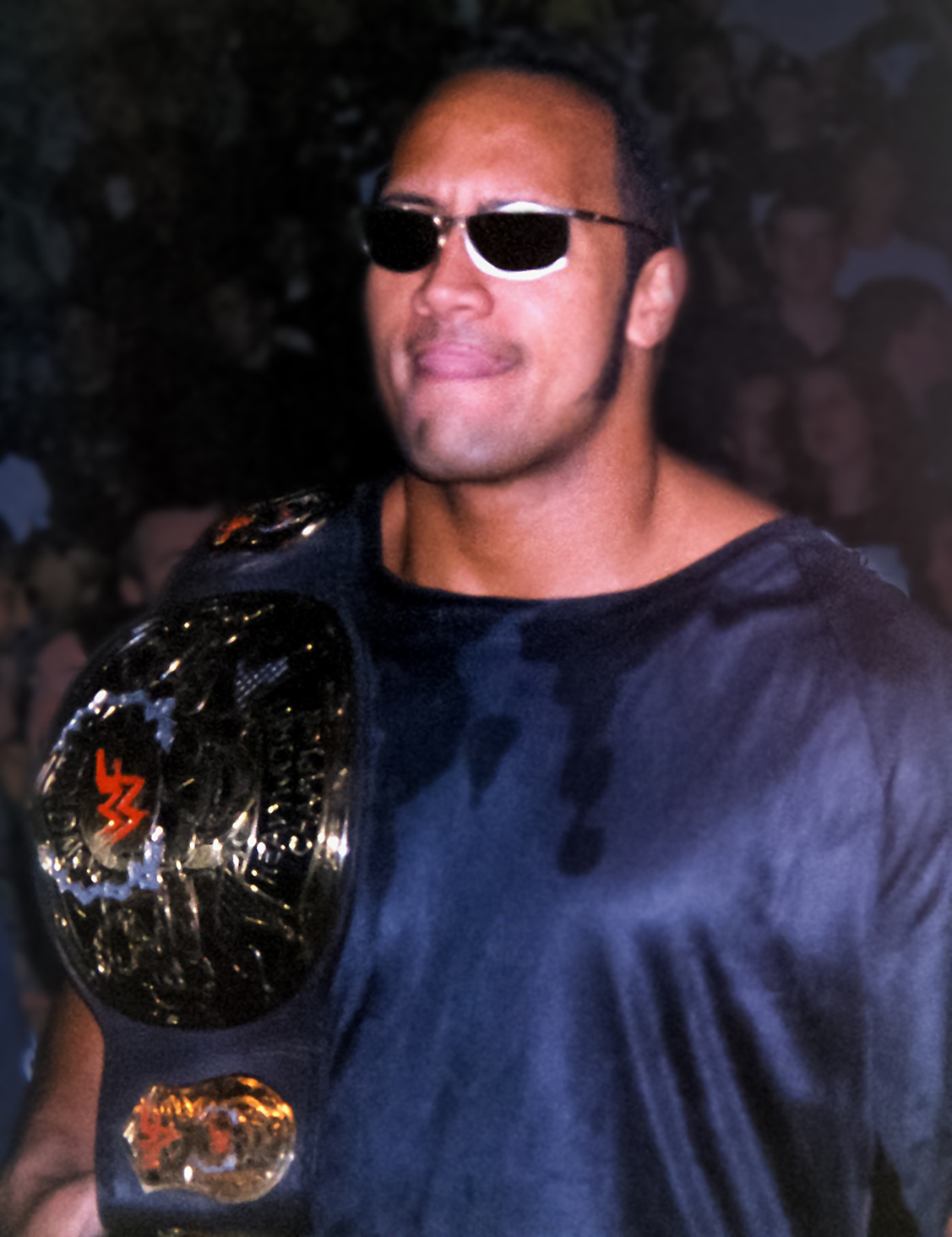
The Rock pictured with "Stone Cold" Steve Austin's custom "Smoking Skull" belt after he had stolen it from Austin in storyline in 1999

Custom championship belts have been created to honor certain reigning champions or match their characters. During Hogan's reign in 1986, he had a modified version of the Hogan '86 made, which included a picture of himself at the center. Not much is known about this "mystery belt" as he quickly reverted to the original Hogan '86 version. A much larger version similar to the Hogan '86 championship belt was created for André the Giant before WrestleMania III, although he never wore it as champion.

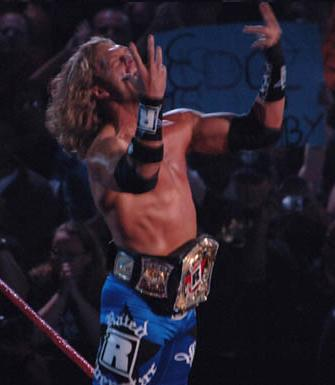
Four-time champion Edge, pictured with his custom "Rated R Spinner" belt that he used during his second reign in 2006

A custom championship belt was used by "Stone Cold" Steve Austin during his second reign (1998), which included his "Smoking Skull" logo as well as rattle snakes. As an answer, The Rock also had a custom championship belt designed and constructed, including his trademark "Brahma Bull" logo, but due to creative reasons, it never appeared on television. The Spinner Belt, originally a customized belt for John Cena, remained the standard title belt from 2005 to 2013. During Edge's second reign in 2006, he introduced his own variation, the "Rated R Spinner" design, replacing the WWE scratch logo with his "Rated R Superstar" logo. Edge had sketched a completely new custom design, but due to creative differences, it did not get made. Edge, who was not a fan of his spinner version and wanted a custom design that meant something, later said that WWE probably decided to go with the Rated R Spinner version in order to sell more merchandise.

During Daniel Bryan's fourth reign (2018–2019) as part of his environmentalist heel gimmick, he threw the standard title belt in a garbage can (bemoaning the fact it was made from leather) and introduced a new custom belt, dubbed the "Planet's Championship", featuring the same design as the "Network Logo" belt, but made from "entirely sustainable materials", such as the strap being made from hemp and the center and side plates carved from wood of a naturally fallen oak tree; the side plates also had his name instead of the WWE logo.

=== In other sports ===
In October 2014, WWE presented the San Francisco Giants a replica of the "Network Logo" belt for winning the 2014 World Series. This began a tradition for WWE, and they have since created custom WWE Championship belts for winners in professional sports, with the side plates commemorating the achievement. They have also presented a custom belt to exceptionally notable people for their efforts in their profession. WWE had originally presented custom WWE Championships to winners in both male and female sports, but in 2018, they began presenting those in female sports with custom Women's Championship belts.

Since that original gift in 2014, WWE has presented custom WWE Championship belts to winners of the World Series, Super Bowl, NBA Finals, FIFA Women's World Cup, College Football Playoff National Championship, Stanley Cup Final, Australian Open, Premier League, Bundesliga, Indian Premier League, Liga MX, Argentine Primera División, Major League Baseball Home Run Derby, Formula One World Championship, UEFA Champions League, Overwatch League, Cricket World Cup, Men's US Open, and Canadian Football League Grey Cup. WWE also presented a title to London police officer Charlie Guenigault for his "exceptional bravery" during the 2017 London Bridge attack, and to the U.S. servicemen and women who had helped in hosting WWE Tribute to the Troops (2015–2023), as well as for their continued service to the country. In 2020, WWE Championship belts were also presented to Christophe Agius and Philippe Chéreau, WWE announcers in France, for 20 consecutive years presenting WWE on French television. With the introduction of the Undisputed WWE Championship belt in June 2023, WWE have since presented custom versions of it.

== Reigns ==
Current and two-time champion Sami Zayn

The WWE Championship was the first world championship introduced into the promotion in 1963, and by the 1980s, it had become among the most prestigious world titles in professional wrestling. Into the 21st century, the WWE Championship is still widely referred to as among the seven most prestigious (if not the most important) world championship in professional wrestling.

The inaugural champion was Buddy Rogers, and there have been 154 official reigns among 56 different official champions overall and 11 vacancies. The longest reigning champion is Bruno Sammartino, the second title holder whose first reign lasted from May 17, 1963, to January 18, 1971, for a total of 2,803 days (7 years, 8 months, and 1 day); Sammartino also holds the record for longest combined reign at 4,040 days across his two reigns. André the Giant is the shortest reigning champion, officially holding the title for 1 minute, 48 seconds due to selling the title to Ted DiBiase following his title win. The youngest champion is Brock Lesnar, who won the title for the first time at the age of 25 years old during SummerSlam in August 2002, while the oldest champion is one-time holder Mr. McMahon, who won the title at the age of 54 during the September 16, 1999, episode of SmackDown. John Cena holds the record for most reigns with 14, which occurred between 2005 and 2025.

Sami Zayn is the current champion in his second reign. He won the title by defeating CM Punk on the September 11, 2026, episode of SmackDown in Azcapotzalco, Mexico City, Mexico.

== See also ==
- World championships in WWE

== Notes ==
Sporting positions
Preceded by NWA World Heavyweight Championship	WWE's top world championship 1963–present	Succeeded by Still active
