= The Alliance (professional wrestling) =

Professional wrestling stable

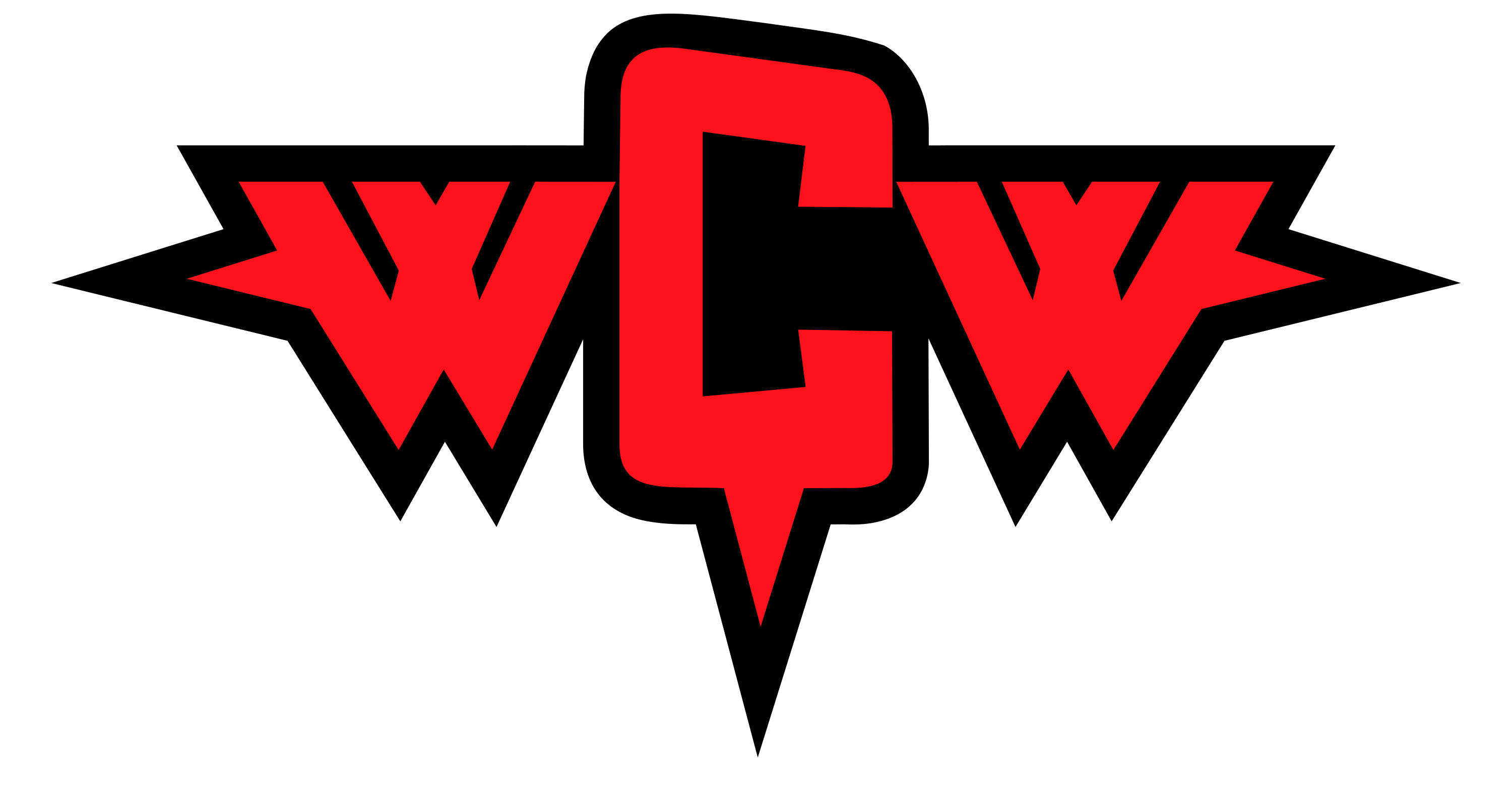
- The WCW logo used as an identifier for The Alliance; this logo was introduced before The Alliance was formed and was intended to be the logo of the scrapped WWF-produced WCW weekly program

Stable
- Members: Shane McMahon (owner of WCW); Stephanie McMahon (owner of ECW); Other members
- Name(s): The Alliance; WCW/ECW Alliance; The Coalition; Team WCW; Team WCW/ECW; WECW
- Debut: May 28, 2001
- Disbanded: November 18, 2001
- Years active: 2001

The Alliance, also known as Team WCW/ECW and The Coalition, was a villainous professional wrestling stable in the World Wrestling Federation (WWF, now WWE) and the Heartland Wrestling Association (HWA) that existed during the Invasion storyline from May 28, 2001 to November 18, 2001.

The stable came about as a result of the WWF's purchase of World Championship Wrestling (WCW) in March 2001. The Extreme Championship Wrestling (ECW) name was brought in later to help boost the presence of WCW after the original ECW promotion closed in April 2001.

== History ==
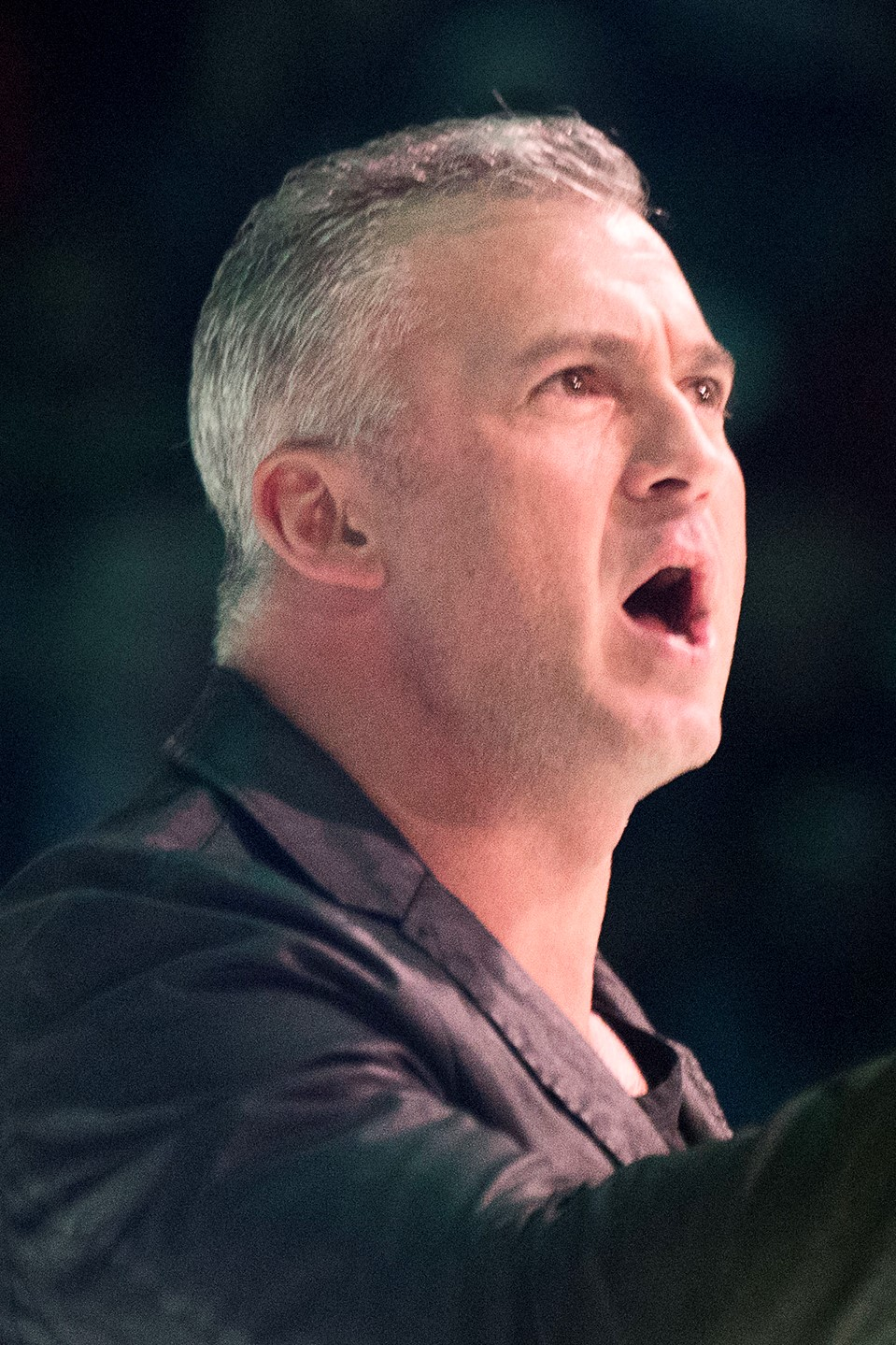
Shane McMahon, the storyline owner of WCW

The original plan for The Invasion storyline was WCW being a babyface group, led by Shane McMahon (who was the owner of WCW during the angle) to go against the heel owner of the WWF, Mr. McMahon. During May and June 2001, wrestlers identified as being "under contract to WCW" (such as Lance Storm and Mike Awesome) "invaded" WWF programming, by performing several run-ins during matches. The ultimate goal, reportedly, was for WCW to "take over" WWF's flagship show Raw Is War and rebrand it as its own television program, while the WWF would retain control of SmackDown! as their own show. To test the waters for this, the final twenty minutes of the July 2 edition of Raw Is War was given over to WCW, which (in kayfabe) brought in its own commentators (Scott Hudson and Arn Anderson), ring announcer (Stacy Keibler), referee (Nick Patrick), ring apron, and Chyron graphics, to present a match between Booker T and Buff Bagwell for Booker T's WCW Championship (which he had won on the final episode of Nitro). This continued later that week on SmackDown!, where Gregory Helms lost the WCW Cruiserweight Championship to Billy Kidman and Booker T defended the WCW Championship against Diamond Dallas Page.

The Booker T/Bagwell title match, however, was very poorly received both by television viewers and the live crowd in the arena; sports journalist Michael Landsberg reported that many have called the bout "the worst match ever". The two other WCW matches also received a negative fan reaction. The decision was thus made to make WCW a heel group who was out to destroy the WWF. On the July 9 episode of Raw Is War, when then-face WCW owner Shane was scheduled to face Page in a street fight, the two instead attacked The Undertaker, turning Shane heel (Page had already debuted in WWF as a heel, as part of a stalker angle with Undertaker and his wife).

Later that night, during a tag team match pitting Chris Jericho and Kane against WCW's Lance Storm and Mike Awesome, former Extreme Championship Wrestling (ECW) stars Rob Van Dam and Tommy Dreamer interfered and attacked Jericho and Kane. Justin Credible, Raven, Tazz, Rhyno, and The Dudley Boyz (all ECW alumni) came to the ring shortly thereafter and joined Van Dam and Dreamer in attacking Jericho and Kane, and Raw Is War color commentator Paul Heyman announced that together, he was forming an ECW team to take on the feuding WWF and WCW factions.

Later that evening, Vince and Shane agreed to put aside their differences and join forces to take out ECW once and for all in a twenty-man brawl between Team WWF (Hardcore Holly, Big Show, APA, and Billy Gunn), Team WCW (Chris Kanyon, Chuck Palumbo, Sean O'Haire, Shawn Stasiak, and Mark Jindrak), and the ECW invaders. When the WCW and ECW wrestlers faced off in the ring, however, they did not fight but rather congratulated each other and attacked the WWF wrestlers. It was revealed that ECW had merged with WCW to form a "supergroup" to more effectively challenge the WWF and that Stephanie McMahon had purchased the defunct company. This combined group was originally referred to as "WECW" on WCW.com and then as "Team WCW/ECW," but the rights to ECW's assets (including the ability to use of its name on-air) were still being debated in bankruptcy court at that time, so the name of the group was changed to "The Alliance". The Alliance also extended to the WWF's developmental territory the Heartland Wrestling Association (HWA), itself a former WCW developmental territory, where members appeared as "Team WCW".

At the Invasion pay-per-view on July 22, Team Alliance (Booker T, Diamond Dallas Page, Rhyno, and The Dudley Boyz) defeated Team WWF (Stone Cold Steve Austin, The Undertaker, Kane, Kurt Angle, and Chris Jericho) in a ten-man tag team match billed as the "Inaugural Brawl". During the match, Austin turned on the WWF and joined The Alliance, helping them score the victory, after about a week of teasing a face turn.

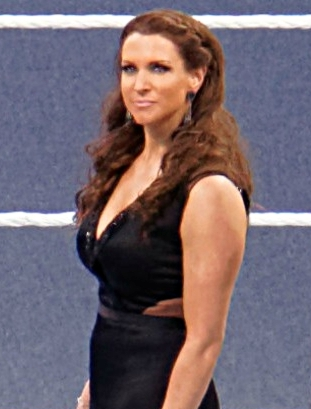
Stephanie McMahon, the storyline owner of ECW

Over the next few months, the two sides fought back and forth. Except for the feuds for select wrestlers (X-Factor and Christian, for example), every feud on WWF programming involved a WWF wrestler facing an Alliance wrestler. Ten combined WWF and WCW championships were defended among all the wrestlers in the various feuds. Over time, numerous WWF wrestlers would defect to The Alliance, including Test, William Regal, Ivory, and Christian. Former ECW and WCW wrestler Steven Richards would belatedly defect to The Alliance, bringing WCW alumni KroniK with him. In return, Chuck Palumbo and Torrie Wilson defected from The Alliance to the WWF. Kurt Angle also defected to The Alliance on the October 29 episode of Raw.

In late October, both sides agreed to end things once and for all. A "Winner Take All" classic Survivor Series elimination tag team match was set for the Survivor Series pay-per-view on November 18, with the losing company going out of business forever. In addition, two title unification matches were signed, as the WCW Tag Team Championship and the WWF Tag Team Championship were to be unified in a match between The Dudley Boyz (WCW) and The Hardy Boyz (WWF), while Edge and Test would meet in a match to unify Edge's WCW United States Championship with Test's WWF Intercontinental Championship. Further, 20 WWF and Alliance members would square off in what was called the "Immunity Battle Royal", with the winner of the match keeping his job for one year regardless of whether his side won or not.

In the end, Team WWF (The Rock, Chris Jericho, The Undertaker, Kane, and Big Show) defeated Team Alliance (Stone Cold Steve Austin, Kurt Angle, Rob Van Dam, Booker T, and Shane McMahon) when Angle double-crossed The Alliance by turning on Austin while he was fighting The Rock during the closing stages of the match. The Rock then pinned Austin, not only putting The Alliance out of business, but also being a symbolic victory of WWF's dominance over its former rivals. Earlier in the night, The Dudley Boyz defeated The Hardy Boyz to unify the tag team championships while Edge defeated Test to win the Intercontinental Championship. Despite his loss, Test entered the Immunity Battle Royal later that night and won.

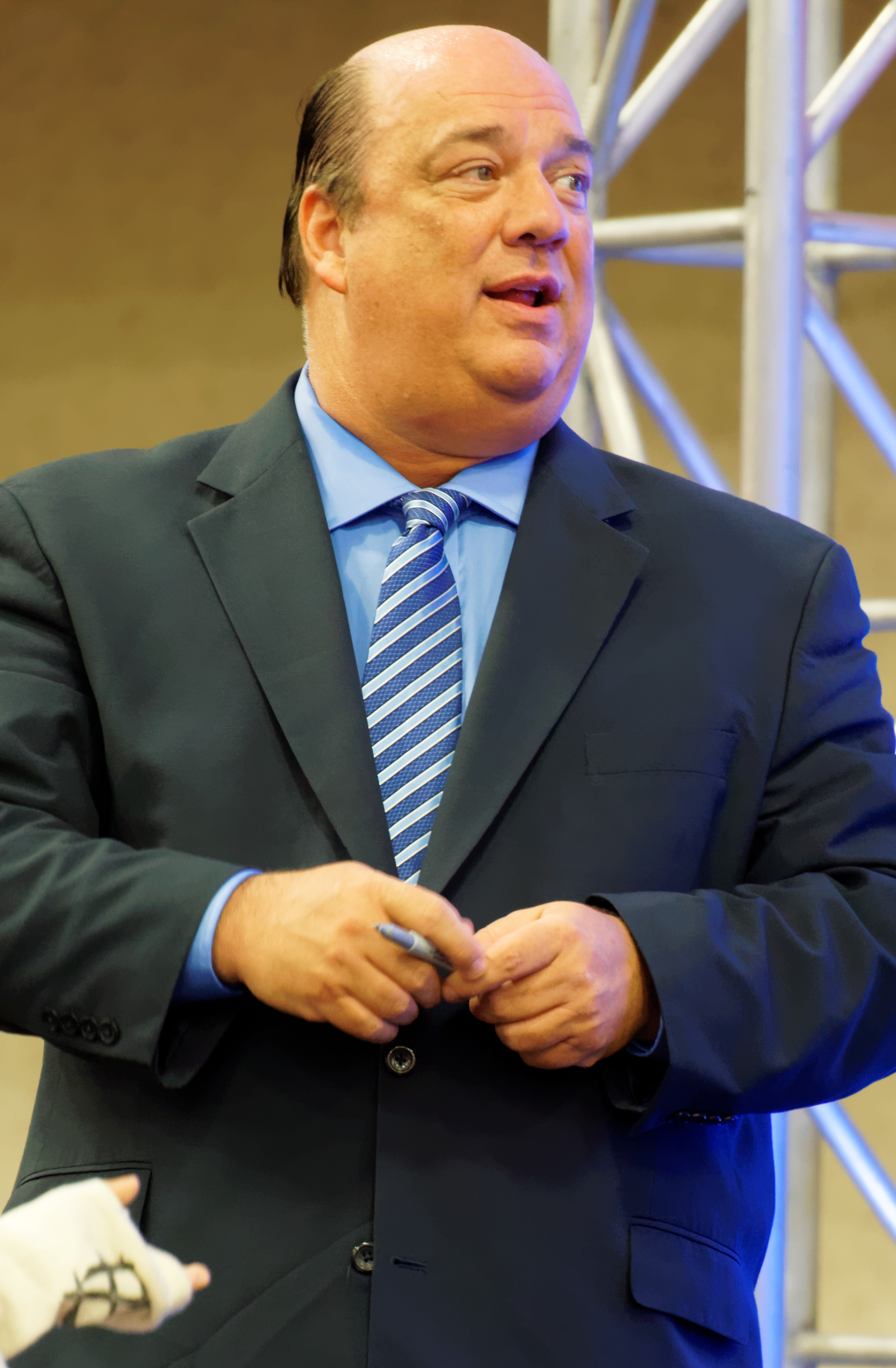
Paul Heyman, the previous real-life owner of ECW

With The Alliance's loss, nearly all of their members lost their jobs in storyline following the match. Exceptions were made for Stone Cold Steve Austin, then-WWF Champion; The Dudley Boyz, who won the WWF Tag Team Championship; Stacy Keibler, the Dudleys' manager; Rob Van Dam, who at the time was the Hardcore Champion; Christian, who at the time was the European Champion; Immunity Battle Royal winner Test; and Alliance Commissioner William Regal, who was forced to join the "Mr. McMahon Kiss My Ass Club" to keep his job. Some of them would be hired back over the next few months, with the majority of them returning when the brand extension began. The WWF Light Heavyweight Championship, which was held at the time by X-Pac, was quietly retired and replaced with WCW's Cruiserweight Championship.

The next night on Raw, Mr. McMahon celebrated his victory by making a slow return to his villain character, aligning himself with The Alliance members that kept their jobs. Later that night, he resumed his rivalry with Austin, who turned face by attacking Angle and aligning himself with a returning Ric Flair, who was revealed, in storyline, to have bought Shane and Stephanie's stock in the company prior to Survivor Series, making him the new co-owner of the WWF, along with McMahon. After being "fired", Shane walked out on his own and congratulated his father for his victory, and spent most of the next eighteen months away from television; he would return to feud with Kane in 2003. Stephanie blamed Shane for everything and was escorted out of the arena by security, but unlike Shane she made a quick return and began appearing again shortly after the return of her then on-screen husband Triple H in January 2002, which led to a three-month-long feud that ended shortly after WrestleMania X8 on March 17.

One of the more important changes following Survivor Series was the removal of the WCW branding from The Rock's WCW Championship, with the title becoming known simply as the World Championship. Co-owners McMahon and Flair decided that, since there were now two world championships in the company, a tournament would be set up at Vengeance on December 9 to crown an Undisputed WWF Champion. Current WWF Champion Stone Cold Austin was to take on Kurt Angle while World Champion The Rock was to take on Chris Jericho, with the winners then facing off to become the first undisputed champion in company history. Jericho, who had been feuding with The Rock over the WCW Championship dating back to October, won the World title while Austin defeated Angle to retain his WWF Championship. Jericho, thanks to a returning Booker T, defeated Austin to become the first Undisputed WWF Champion. Following the crowning of the inaugural Undisputed WWF Champion, mentions of WCW and The Alliance ceased on WWF programming.

== Members ==
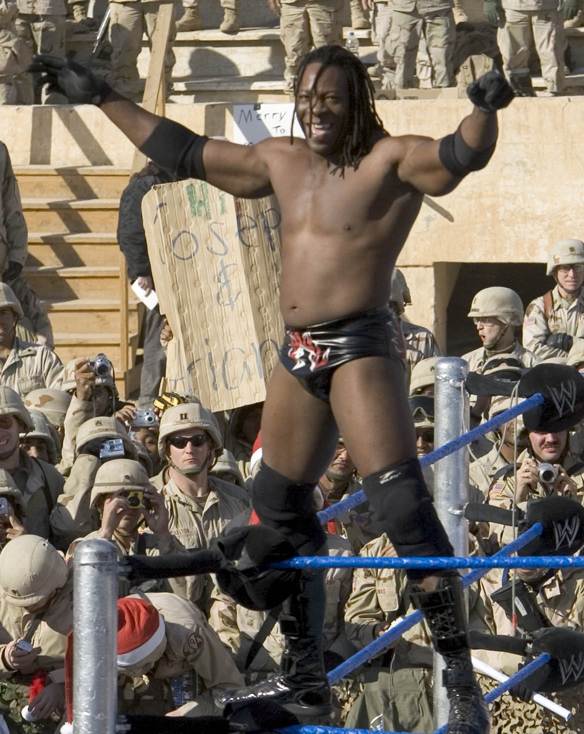
Booker T was the first leader of The Alliance

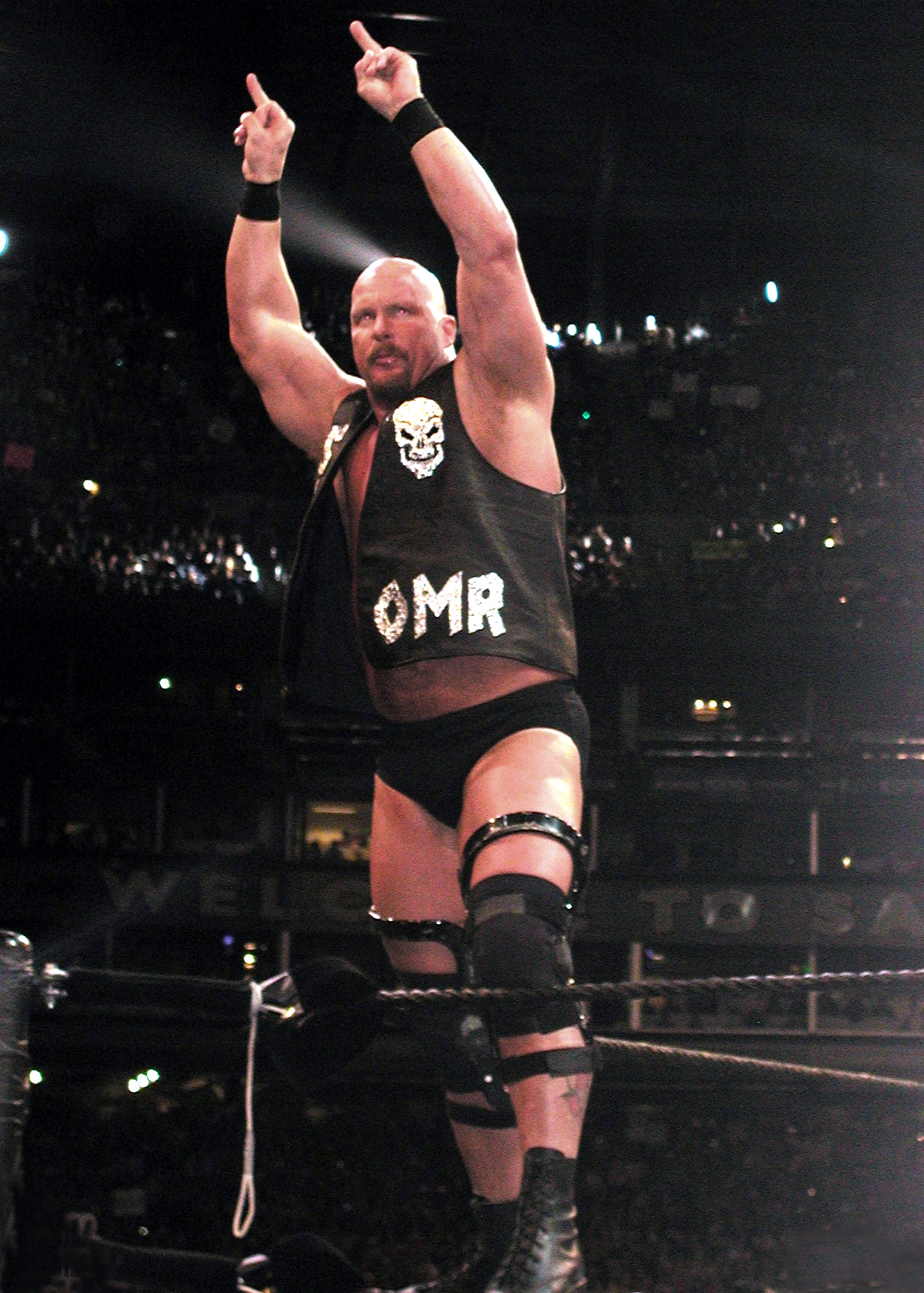
Stone Cold Steve Austin was the second leader of The Alliance

| Member | Representative | Joined | Left | Notes |
|---|---|---|---|---|
| Arn Anderson | WCW | July 2001 | November 18, 2001 | WCW color commentator |
| Billy Kidman | WCW | July 5, 2001 | November 18, 2001 | |
| Billy Silverman | WCW | July 2001 | November 18, 2001 | Referee |
| Booker T | WCW | June 24, 2001 | November 18, 2001 | First leader |
| Brian Adams | WCW | September 4, 2001 | September 30, 2001 | |
| Brian Webber/Brian Hebner | WCW | July 2001 | November 18, 2001 | Referee |
| Bryan Clark | WCW | September 4, 2001 | September 30, 2001 | |
| Bubba Ray Dudley | ECW | July 9, 2001 | November 18, 2001 | |
| Buff Bagwell | WCW | July 1, 2001 | July 9, 2001 | |
| Charles Robinson | WCW | July 22, 2001 | November 18, 2001 | Referee |
| Chavo Guerrero | WCW | July 5, 2001 | November 18, 2001 | |
| Chris Kanyon | WCW | July 5, 2001 | November 18, 2001 | |
| Christian | WCW | October 15, 2001 | November 18, 2001 | |
| Chuck Palumbo | WCW | June 28, 2001 | October 25, 2001 | |
| Dave Taylor | WCW | | | Member of Team WCW in HWA |
| D-Von Dudley | ECW | July 9, 2001 | November 18, 2001 | |
| Debra | WCW | July 22, 2001 | November 18, 2001 | |
| Diamond Dallas Page | WCW | June 18, 2001 | November 18, 2001 | |
| Elix Skipper | WCW | | | Member of Team WCW in HWA |
| Evan Karagias | WCW | | | Member of Team WCW in HWA |
| Gregory Helms/Hurricane Helms/The Hurricane | WCW | July 5, 2001 | November 18, 2001 | |
| Hugh Morrus | WCW | June 4, 2001 | November 18, 2001 | |
| Ivory | WCW | August 6, 2001 | November 18, 2001 | |
| Jamie Knoble | WCW | | | Member of Team WCW in HWA |
| Jason Jett/E. Z. Money | WCW | | | Member of Team WCW in HWA |
| Jazz | ECW | November 18, 2001 | November 18, 2001 | |
| Jimmy Yang | WCW | | | Member of Team WCW in HWA |
| Johnny Stamboli | WCW | | | Member of Team WCW in HWA |
| Justin Credible | ECW | July 9, 2001 | November 18, 2001 | |
| Kaz Hayashi | WCW | | | Member of Team WCW in HWA |
| Kid Romeo | WCW | | | Member of Team WCW in HWA |
| Kurt Angle | WCW | October 29, 2001 | November 18, 2001 | |
| Kwee Wee | WCW | | | Member of Team WCW in HWA |
| Lance Storm | ECW | May 28, 2001 | November 18, 2001 | |
| Lash LeRoux | WCW | | | Member of Team WCW in HWA |
| Mark Jindrak | WCW | | | Member of Team WCW in HWA |
| Mighty Molly | WCW | October 1, 2001 | November 18, 2001 | |
| Mike Awesome | ECW | June 25, 2001 | November 18, 2001 | |
| Mike Sanders | WCW | | | Member of Team WCW in HWA |
| Nick Patrick | WCW | July 22, 2001 | November 18, 2001 | Referee |
| Paul Heyman | ECW | July 9, 2001 | November 18, 2001 | Raw Is War color commentator |
| Raven | ECW | July 9, 2001 | November 18, 2001 | |
| Reno | WCW | | | Member of Team WCW in HWA |
| Rhyno | ECW | July 9, 2001 | November 18, 2001 | |
| Rob Van Dam | ECW | July 9, 2001 | November 18, 2001 | |
| Scott Hudson | WCW | July 2, 2001 | November 18, 2001 | WCW play-by-play commentator |
| Sean O'Haire | WCW | June 28, 2001 | November 18, 2001 | |
| Shane McMahon | WCW | May 28, 2001 | November 18, 2001 | WCW owner |
| Shannon Moore | WCW | | | Member of Team WCW in HWA |
| Shawn Stasiak | WCW | July 2001 | November 18, 2001 | |
| Stacy Keibler | WCW | June 14, 2001 | November 18, 2001 | |
| Stephanie McMahon | ECW | July 9, 2001 | November 18, 2001 | ECW owner |
| Steven Richards | WCW | September 4, 2001 | November 18, 2001 | |
| Stone Cold Steve Austin | WCW | July 22, 2001 | November 18, 2001 | Second leader |
| Tazz | ECW | July 9, 2001 | November 8, 2001 | SmackDown! color commentator |
| Terri | ECW | August 2001 | November 18, 2001 | |
| Test | WCW | August 9, 2001 | November 18, 2001 | |
| Tommy Dreamer | ECW | July 9, 2001 | November 18, 2001 | |
| Torrie Wilson | WCW | June 28, 2001 | August 30, 2001 | |
| William Regal | WCW | October 8, 2001 | November 18, 2001 | Alliance Commissioner |

== Sub-groups ==
| Affiliate | Members | Tenure | Type |
|---|---|---|---|
| 3 Count | Evan Karagias; Shannon Moore | 2001 (in HWA) | Tag team |
| DDP & Kanyon | Diamond Dallas Page; Chris Kanyon | 2001 | Tag team |
| The Dudley Boyz | Bubba Ray Dudley; D-Von Dudley | 2001 | Tag team |
| KroniK | Brian Adams; Bryan Clark | 2001 | Tag team |
| Jung Dragons | Jimmy Yang; Kaz Hayashi | 2001 (in HWA) | Tag team |
| Palumbo & O'Haire | Chuck Palumbo; Sean O'Haire | 2001 | Tag team |

== Championships and accomplishments ==
- Heartland Wrestling Association
  - HWA Cruiserweight Championship (1 time) – Jamie Knoble
  - HWA Heavyweight Championship (1 time) – E. Z. Money
  - HWA Tag Team Championship (1 time) – Evan Karagias and Shannon Moore
- World Wrestling Federation
  - WCW Championship (2 times) – Booker T
  - WCW Cruiserweight Championship (3 times) – Gregory Helms (1), and Billy Kidman (2)
  - WCW United States Championship (4 times) – Booker T (1), Chris Kanyon (1), Rhyno (1), and Kurt Angle (1)
  - WCW Tag Team Championship (3 times) – Chuck Palumbo and Sean O'Haire (1), Booker T and Test (1), and The Dudley Boyz (1)
  - WWF Championship (2 times) – Stone Cold Steve Austin
  - WWF European Championship (2 times) – The Hurricane (1), and Christian (1)
  - WWF Hardcore Championship (4 times) – Mike Awesome (1), and Rob Van Dam (3)
  - WWF Intercontinental Championship (3 times) – Lance Storm (1), Christian (1), and Test (1)
  - WWF Tag Team Championship (4 times) – The Dudley Boyz (2), Diamond Dallas Page and Chris Kanyon (1), and Booker T and Test (1)

== See also ==
- The Authority
