= Crist Brothers =

Professional wrestling tag team

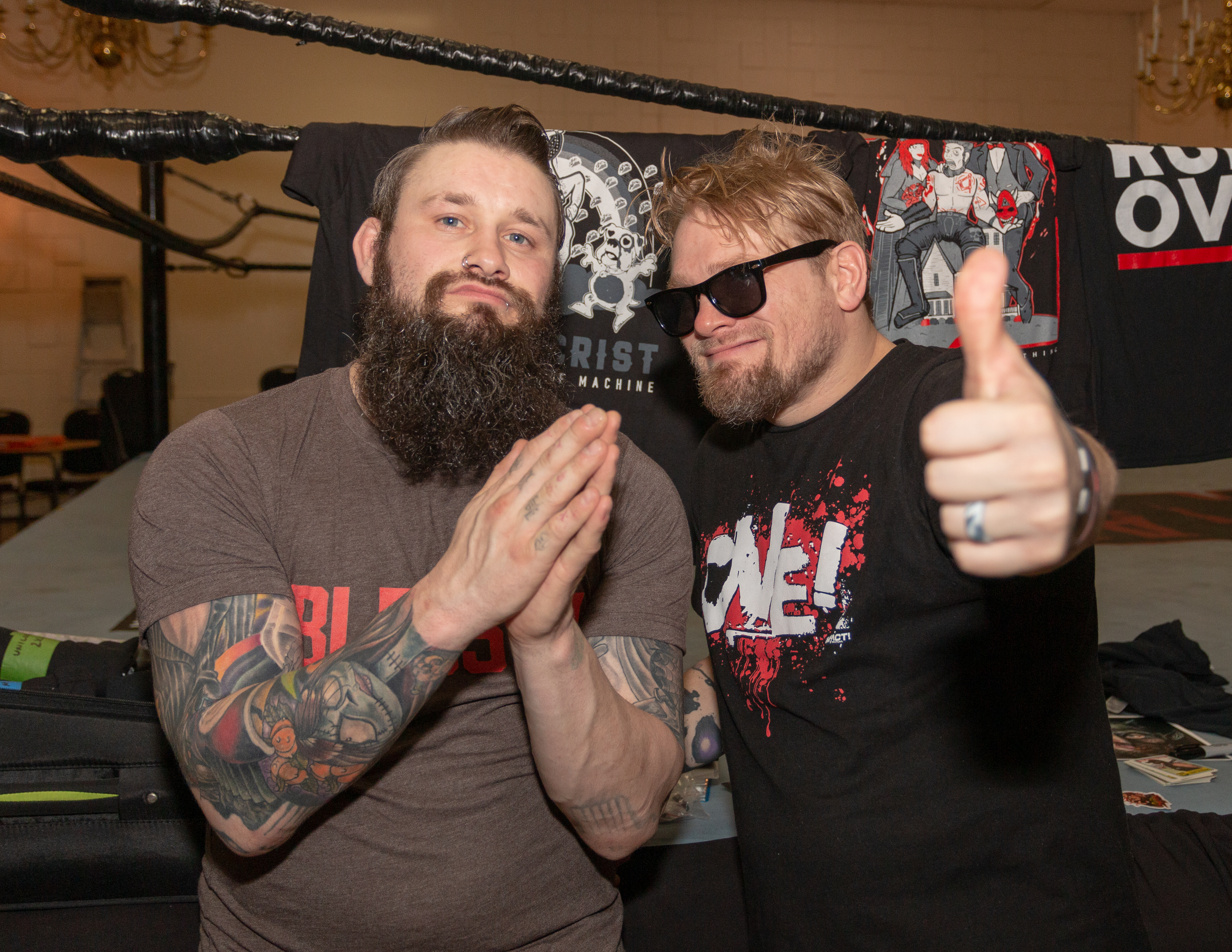
- Dave (left) and Jake (right) in February 2019

Personal information
- Born: David Crist Jr. (Dave); John Crist (Jake) New Carlisle, Ohio, U.S.

Professional wrestling career
- Ring name(s): The Crist Brothers; The Flying Mendoza Brothers; The Irish Airborne; Lotus and Crazy J Ohio Is 4 Killers; Ohio Versus Everything; The Ring Rydas
- Billed height: 5 ft 10 in (1.78 m) – Dave; 5 ft 8 in (1.73 m) – Jake
- Billed weight: 393 lb (178 kg); 198 lb (90 kg) – Dave; 195 lb (88 kg) – Jake
- Billed from: Dayton, Ohio; Dublin, Ohio; Southwest Detroit
- Trained by: Bill Kovaleski; Matt Stryker
- Debut: 2003
- Retired: 2020

The Crist Brothers were an American professional wrestling tag team consisting of brothers David Crist Jr. and John Crist, who are best known by their respective ring names Dave Crist and Jake Crist. They are best known for their time with Impact Wrestling, where they are one-time Impact World Tag Team Champions, as well as Jake having won the Impact X Division Championship once.

For much of their career, they wrestled on the Midwest independent circuit, most notably for the Heartland Wrestling Association (HWA) as The Irish Airborne, where they won the HWA Tag Team Championship a record six times. They also wrestled for Combat Zone Wrestling (CZW), Chikara, IWA Mid-South (IWA MS), and Ring of Honor (ROH), as well as Canadian promotions, Far North Wrestling (FNW) and UWA Hardcore Wrestling (UWA). After years of being The Irish Airborne, they changed their name to Ohio Is 4 Killers (OI4K). The team also competed for Juggalo Championship Wrestling as The Ring Rydas, where they are former JCW Tag Team Champions. They made their debut for Impact Wrestling in 2017 and teamed up with Sami Callihan and later Madman Fulton as Ohio Versus Everything (OVE).

== Professional wrestling career ==
=== Buckeye Pro Wrestling (2004) ===
Under the names Lotus and Crazy J, the Crists made their debut in Buckeye Pro Wrestling against Dean and Chet Jablonski in which they were defeated. The Airborne continued to wrestle their way through the ranks of BPW often feuding with the team of American Youth, ultimately defeating them on February 24, 2004 to become the BPW Tag Team Champions. During their time in BPW, the Irish Airborne had chances to work on cross promotion shows with Heartland Wrestling Association and were eventually offered a match with the HWA.

=== Heartland Wrestling Association (2004–2006) ===
Now achieving their high school goal, the Irish Airborne entered HWA. They became instant fan favorites due to their performance in BPW and the shared fan base. Their first match was a four-way tag match teaming with Viper and Zeta against 4BJ, J.T. Stahr & Jimmy Turner & Ala Hussein. Airborne had continued success in HWA leading to a tag team title championship victory against Necessary Roughness in May 2005. As success came quickly for the brothers, so did tension, ultimately leading to a bloody feud that began in the fall of 2005 and lasted through early 2006. The feud culminated in a best-of-seven series in which each brother would attempt to top the other in amounts of violence and wit. The feud finally ended in one of HWA's bloodiest and most gruesome ladder matches to date. Both men realizing neither could top the other ended the feud and began to wrestle as a team once again.

=== Name change and Ring of Honor (2006–2007) ===
On January 27, 2006, the Crists were allowed to wrestle a dark match in Ring of Honor against each other in which Lotus defeated Crazy J. The following evening they were again allowed to wrestle in a dark match, this time as a tag team against Shane Hagadorn & Conrad Kennedy III in which they won. On March 4, 2006, at an Insanity Pro Wrestling show in Indianapolis, Indiana, the Airborne announced that they would no longer be wrestling under the names of Lotus and Crazy J, but instead under their real names of Dave and Jake Crist. John decided to use the first name "Jake" rather than John because at that moment there were too many well known Johns in professional wrestling. On March 11, 2006, at Arena Warfare the Crists were able to earn a roster spot with ROH as they took on and defeated Tony Mamaluke and Sal Rinauro at the old ECW Arena.

=== Combat Zone Wrestling (2011–2012; 2014–2016) ===
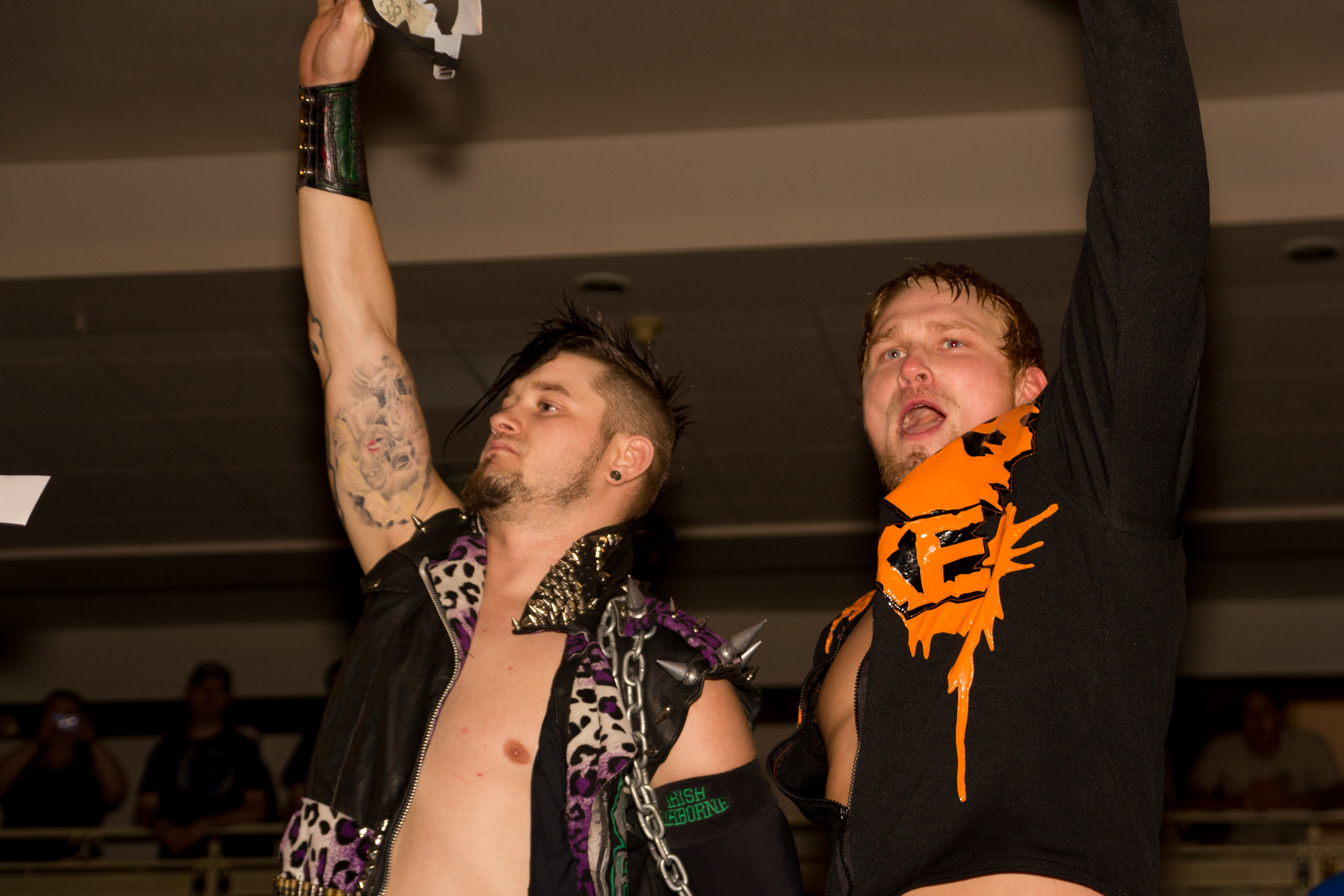
The Irish Airborne making their ring entrance in July 2012

On April 9, 2011, Jake Crist was invited to compete in Combat Zone Wrestling's "Best Of The Best X" representing Insanity Pro Wrestling. Jake Crist would go on to lose in the first round losing against Sami Callihan in a triple threat match that also involved AR Fox. The next night on April 10, 2011 at CZW's "International Incident" Jake Crist would go on to wrestle Jon Moxley in Moxley's final match in CZW in another losing effort. After the match Jake would be attacked by both Moxley and Robert Anthony until Devon Moore made the save. Jake Crist return to CZW on May 14, 2011 in a losing effort against Ryan Mcbride however fans chanted Please Come Back after the match. On June 11, 2011 at CZW "Prelude To Violence" Jake Crist was told by CZW Owner DJ Hyde that if Crist wanted a CZW Contract then he would have to go and defeat Sami Callihan. However Callihan would go on to defeat Jake Crist again. After the match both men showed respect by shaking hands. Adam Cole and Mia Yim would come down to mock Callihan. During the verbal confrontation DJ Hyde would come out and lariat Callihan. Jake Crist would try to save Callihan but wound up attacked by DJ Hyde. On July 9, 2011 at CZW "New Heights" AR Fox would offer a CZW Wired TV Championship title match to Jake Crist. Jake Crist would go on to gain his first win in CZW by defeating AR Fox to become the new CZW Wired TV Champion. Jake's Brother, Dave Crist would also make his CZW debut celebrating with his brother on a title win. On September 10, 2011, Jake Crist was originally supposed to defend his newly won title against Chrisjen Hayme. However, Hayme would withdraw from the match and was replaced by Dustin Rayz. Jake Crist would go on to retain against Dustin Rayz. Dave Crist though, would show more concern about his brothers' TV title than in Jake Crists well being. After the show Dustin Rayz would confront the Irish Airborne about Dave getting involved in his match against Jake. Rayz would then challenge Dave Crist at CZW "Cerebral". Dave would go on to win that match. Jake Crist successfully defended his Wired TV title against Latin Dragon earlier that night. On April 14, 2012, Dave defeated Jake with a low blow to win the CZW Wired TV Championship. Upon entering CZW, the Irish Airborne formed Ohio is 4 Killers stable with Nevaeh and Sami Callihan.

On September 27, 2014, at Deja Vu, OI4K defeated the Juicy Product to win the CZW World Tag Team Championship. On July 11, 2015, at New Heights, OI4K lost the CZW World Tag Team Championship to Team Tremendous. In Infinity Pro Wrestling, the Crist Brothers defeated Donnie and Jacob Hollows.

=== Juggalo Championship Wrestling (2010–2016) ===
The Irish Airborne debuted in Juggalo Championship Wrestling on May 16, 2010 in a losing effort to JCW Tag Team Champions Thomaselli Brothers. On May 26, the duo debuted as the masked tag team Ring Rydas. Jake, as Ring Ryda Red, and Dave, as Ring Ryda Blue, lost to Thomaselli Brothers. At Oddball Wrestling 2010, Ring Rydas defeated The Daivari Brothers (Shawn and Ariya Daivari). The following night at Bloodymania IV, the duo lost in a Fatal 4 way Tag Team match that also featured the Haters, The Briscoe Brothers, and The Kings of Wrestling. At 2011's Up in Smoke, the duo defeated Mad Man Pondo and Necro Butcher to become JCW Tag Team Champions. At the next JCW iPPV "St. Andrews Brawl" they defeated the Haters in their first title defense. On July 28, the Ring Rydas lost the JCW Tag Team Championship to U-Gene and Zach Gowen. However, Gowen forfeited the championship after realizing that U-Gene cheated to win and gave the championships back to the Rydas. On December 20, 2014, at Big Ballas, Ring Rydas lost the title against The Hooligans.

=== Big Japan Pro Wrestling (2013) ===
On September 10, 2013, Big Japan Pro Wrestling announced that the Irish Airborne, representing CZW, would be making their Japanese debuts, when they take part in the 2013 Dai Nihon Saikyo Tag League, which runs from September 25 to November 22. The Irish Airborne finished their tournament on October 18 with a record of two wins and three losses, failing to advance from their block.

=== Return to ROH (2017) ===
On June 4, 2017, Jake Crist competed in a gauntlet match at ROH Gateway to Gold for a chance to compete against Christopher Daniels for his ROH World Title later that night. Dave joined the commentary booth for Jake's time in the ring. Dave was not invited to wrestle for ROH due to past conflicts with other roster members. Jake was pinned by Jonathan Gresham.

=== Impact Wrestling (2017–2020) ===
On August 17, 2017, at Destination X, Dave and Jake Crist made their Impact Wrestling debut under the name Ohio Versus Everything (oVe), defeating Jason Cade and Zachary Wentz. At Victory Road, they defeated The Latin American Xchange (Ortiz and Santana) to win the GFW World Tag Team Championship. During their reign, the championship was renamed as the Impact World Tag Team Championship. On the October 12 episode of Impact!, LAX invoked their rematch clause by challenging oVe to a 5150 Street Fight at Bound for Glory.

At Bound for Glory on November 5, Sami Callihan would debut as well as establish his alliance with The Crist Brothers by helping them defeat LAX, with Jake Crist low blowing Ortiz before Callihan delivered a piledriver through a table for the win. They proceeded to attack LAX after the match, resulting in a double turn, with oVe turning from a face tag team into a heel faction also including Callihan. On the January 4, 2018 episode of Impact!, they lost the title to LAX, ending their reign at 164 days. The Crist Brothers and Callihan were later joined by Madman Fulton in March 2019.

On the July 26, 2019 episode of Impact!, Jake Crist defeated Rich Swann to win the Impact X Division Championship. Jake then retained his title in a five-way match at Unbreakable and against Rich Swann on the August 23 episode of Impact!. At Bound for Glory, Jake lost the X Division Championship to Ace Austin in an intergender ladder match also involving Tessa Blanchard, Daga, and Acey Romero, ending his reign at 93 days.

In June 2020, Dave Crist was accused of sexual assault by his ex-girlfriend in the Speaking Out movement. On June 22, due to the allegations as well as mounting concerns around unprofessional behavior in the ring (refusing to apologize for causing injuries, being forced out of the locker room, etc), Dave was released from his contract. On December 15, Jake announced his departure from the company.

On the September 2, 2021 episode of Impact!, Jake answered Josh Alexander's open challenge for the X Division Championship in a losing effort. On May 26, 2023, at Under Siege, Jake was revealed as the mystery partner of Rich Swann and Sami Callihan, defeating The Design (Deaner, Angels, and Kon).

== Personal life ==
Jake Crist is married to fellow professional wrestler Nevaeh. The couple were childhood sweethearts while attending Tecumseh High School and have a daughter, Brooklynn, who was born when both were teenagers. Nevaeh gave birth to the couple's second daughter, Johnnie, on November 23, 2015.

== Championships and accomplishments ==
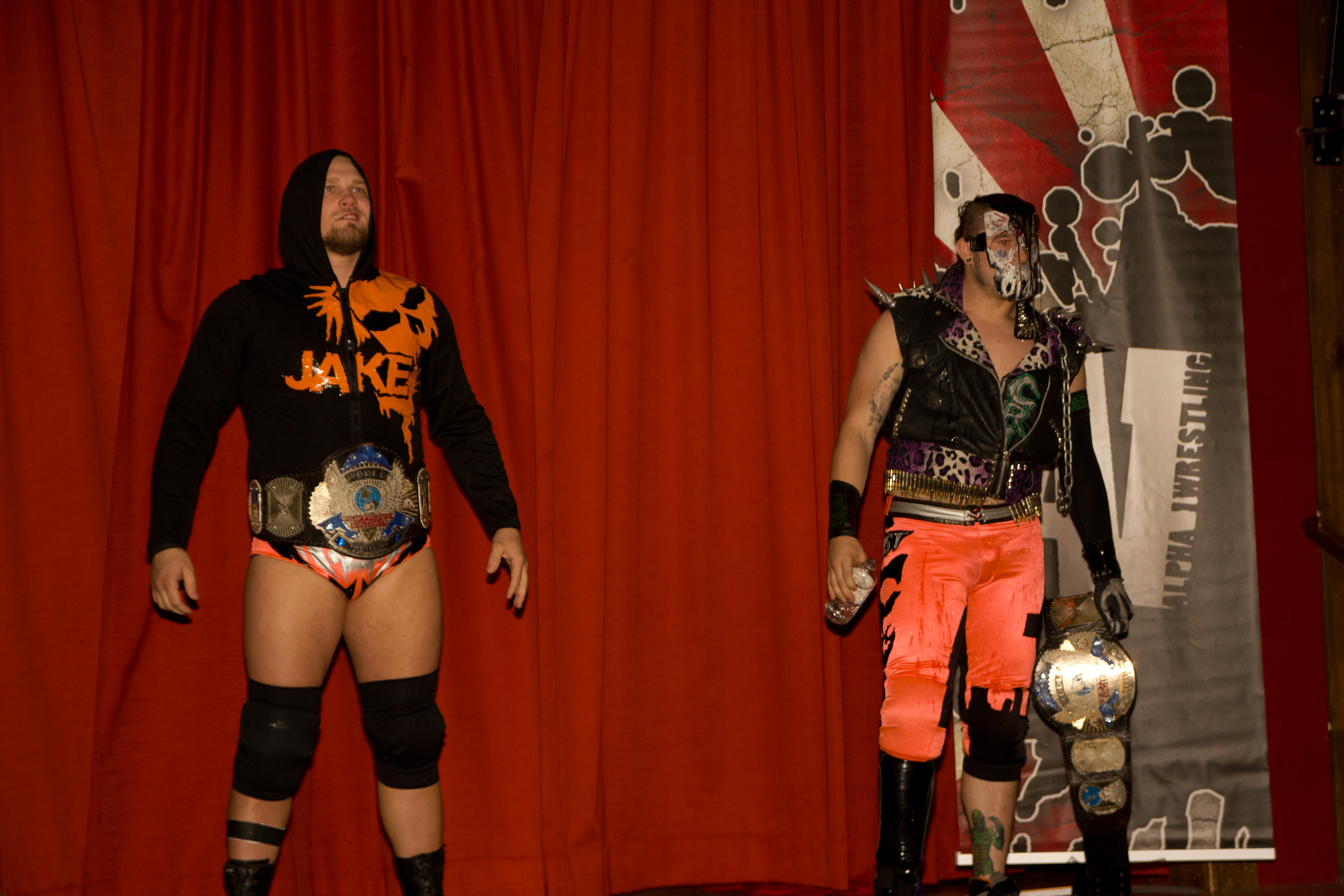
The Irish Airborne with the A1 Tag Team Championships

- All American Wrestling
  - AAW Tag Team Championship (4 times)
- Alpha-1 Wrestling
  - A1 Tag Team Championship (1 time)
- Absolute Intense Wrestling
  - AIW Tag Team Championship (1 time)
- American Pro Wrestling Alliance
  - APWA World Tag Team Championship (1 time)
- Collective League Of Adrenaline Strength And Honor
  - CLASH Championship (1 time) – Jake
- Combat Zone Wrestling
  - CZW World Tag Team Championship (1 time)
  - CZW Wired TV Championship (2 times) – Jake (1), Dave (1)
  - Best of the Best 16 – Dave
- Destination One Wrestling
  - D1W Tag Team Championship (1 time)
  - Harvest Cup (2014) – Dave
- Global Force Wrestling / Impact Wrestling
  - Impact X Division Championship (1 time) – Jake
  - GFW World Tag Team Championship (1 time)
- Heartland Wrestling Association
  - HWA Heavyweight Championship (2 times) – Jake
  - HWA Tag Team Championship (3 times)
  - HWA Television Championship (2 times) – Lotus (Dave) (1), Crazy J (Jake) (1)
  - HWA Heartland Cup (2011) – Jake
- Infinity Pro Reign
  - Infinity Pro Duos Championship (1 time)
- Insanity Pro Wrestling
  - IPW World Heavyweight Championship (1 time) – Jake
  - IPW Tag Team Championship (2 times)
  - IPW Junior Heavyweight Championship (5 times) – Dave (2), Jake (3)
  - IPW Super Junior Heavyweight Tournament – Dave (2004, 2006), Jake (2005)
- IWA East Coast
  - IWA East Coast Tag Team Championship (1 time)
- Independent Wrestling Association Mid-South
  - IWA Mid-South Heavyweight Championship (4 times) – Dave (1), Jake (3)
  - IWA Mid-South Junior Heavyweight Championship (3 times) – Jake
  - First Triple Crown Champion – Jake
- International Wrestling Cartel
  - IWC Tag Team Championship (1 time)
- Juggalo Championship Wrestling
  - JCW Tag Team Championship (5 times)
- Northwest Ohio Wrestling
  - NOW Heavyweight Championship (1 time) – Dave
  - Glass City Tournament (2016) – Dave
- Pro Wrestling Illustrated
  - Ranked Jake No. 135 of the top 500 singles wrestlers in the PWI 500 in 2018
  - Ranked Dave No. 140 of the top 500 singles wrestlers in the PWI 500 in 2018
- Rockstar Pro Wrestling
  - Cicero Cup (2014) – Jake
  - Rockstar Pro Championship (3 times) – Jake (2), Dave (1)
  - Rockstar Pro American Luchacore Championship (1 time) – Dave
  - Rockstar Pro Tag Team Championship (2 times) – Jake and Aaron Williams (1), Jake and Ron Mathis (1)
  - Rockstar Pro Trios Championship (1 time) – Dave with Sami Callihan and Jessicka Havok
- Style Battle
  - Style Battle #1 – Dave
- Xtreme Intense Championship Wrestling
  - XICW Xtreme Intense Championship (1 time) – Jake
  - XICW Tag Team Championship (1 time) – Dave with Aaron Williams, Dezmond Xavier, Kyle Maverick, Trey Miguel and Zachary Wentz
