= The Blade (wrestler) =

American professional wrestler (born 1980)

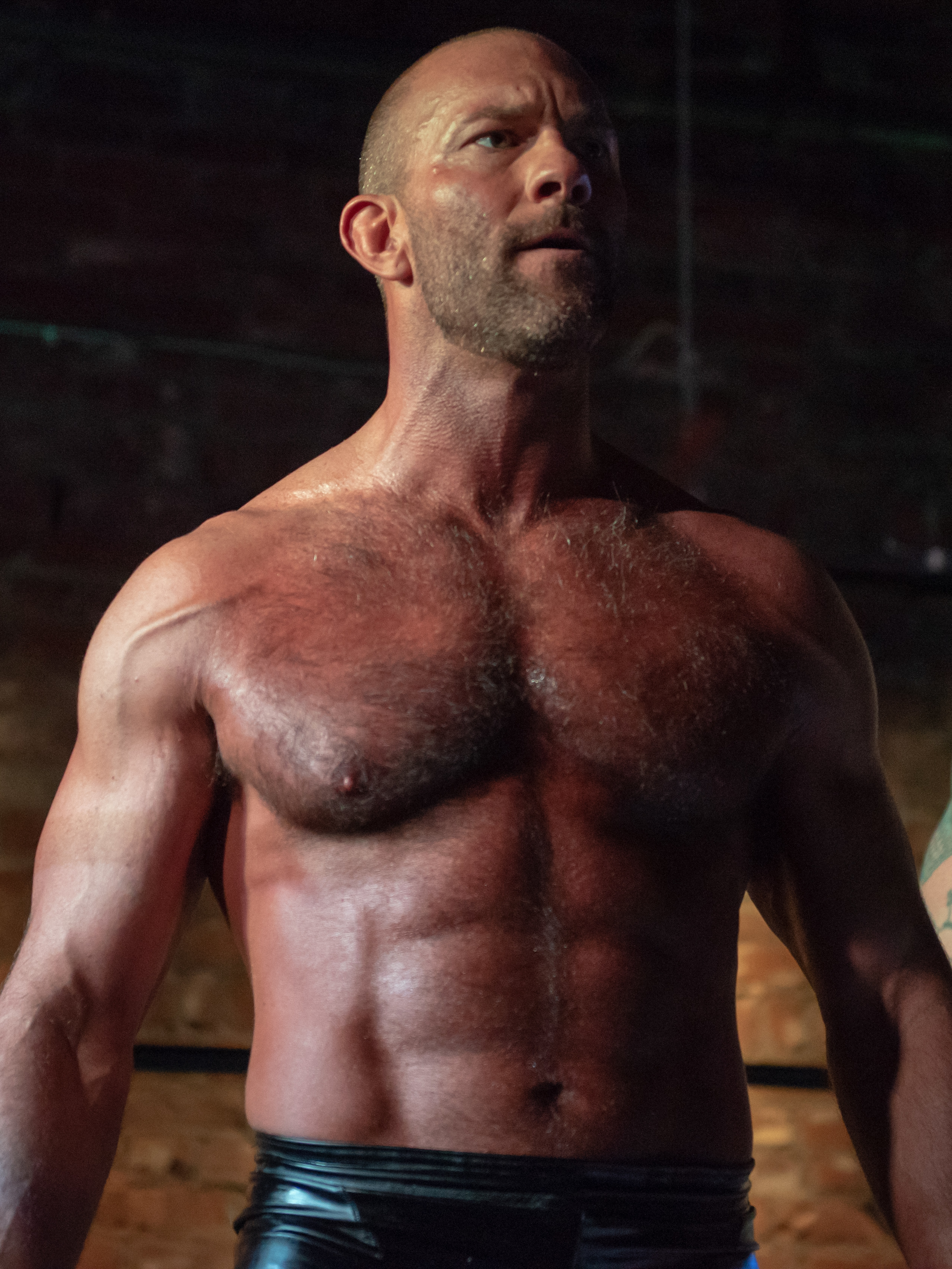
- Blade in 2019

Personal information
- Born: Jesse Guilmette; June 3, 1980 (age 46) Buffalo, New York, U.S.
- Spouse: Allie (m. 2013)

Professional wrestling career
- Ring name(s): The Blade; Braxton Sutter; Pepper Parks; Jesse Guilmette; Jesse Guyver
- Billed height: 6 ft 0 in (183 cm)
- Billed weight: 220 lb (100 kg)
- Billed from: Buffalo, New York; Erie, Pennsylvania
- Trained by: Les Thatcher
- Debut: 2000

Jesse Guilmette (born June 3, 1980) is an American professional wrestler. He is best known for his time with All Elite Wrestling (AEW), under the ring name The Blade. He is known for his tag team work with The Butcher with the name The Butcher and the Blade. Outside of that, he is also known for his work in Impact Wrestling with the ring name Braxton Sutter and on the independent promotions such as Combat Zone Wrestling (CZW), where he was a one-time CZW World Tag Team Champion with the ring name Pepper Parks.

== Professional wrestling career ==
=== Independent circuit (2000–present) ===
Guilmette was trained by Les Thatcher. In 2000, Guilmette began appearing for the Midwestern independent promotion Heartland Wrestling Association under the ring name Pepper Parks where he was paired up with Chet Jablonski as the tag team, The A Squad. Debuting on July 27, 2000, the team faced Astin Ambrose and JJ Duquesne in a losing effort. Parks wrestled for HWA for six years. During this time, he won the HWA Cruiserweight Championship on June 26, 2001, defeating Matt Stryker. On January 1, 2006, Parks gained his first heavyweight championship, defeating Jon Moxley in the tournament finals for the vacant HWA Heavyweight Championship. Parks lost the title to Moxley on May 9, 2006 and regain it once again on November 11, 2006, defeating Chad Collyer in title vs. career match. His second reign lasted 28 days before vacating the title on December 5, 2006 and leaving HWA.

Throughout 2007, Parks primarily wrestled for the National Wrestling Alliance New York based promotions – NWA Empire, NWA Upstate and NWA New York. On May 19, 2007, at the NWA Empire First Anniversary Show, he defeated Brodie Lee to become the NWA Empire Heavyweight Champion. On October 20, 2007, Parks also won the vacated NWA National Heavyweight Championship.

From 2007 to 2010, Guilmette worked a handful of matches under his legal name with World Wrestling Entertainment, facing wrestlers such as The Boogeyman, Vladimir Kozlov, and Shad Gaspard in squash matches.

On January 16, 2010, Parks began appearing for Empire State Wrestling, losing to Freddie Midnight in his first match. On September 11, 2010, he went on to win the ESW Tag Team Championship with Kevin Grace. Parks and Grace lost the titles on June 4, 2011, to The Rochester Wrecking Crew.

In 2017, Parks formed a tag team with Andy Williams as The Butcher and the Blade. They made their debut in Pro Wrestling Rampage (PWR) on September 9, 2017, defeating the Upper Echelon (Colby Redd and P. B. Smooth) for the PWR Tag Team Championship.

Starting in January 2018, the duo became a regular tag team in Buffalo, New York based Empire State Wrestling (ESW), calling the promotion their home and competing against teams involving Ultimo Dragon, Eddie Kingston, and Homicide. In April 2018, they made their Bar Wrestling debut teaming with Brody King in a losing effort against Eli Drake, Joey Ryan, and Kevin Martenson. They would later team with Tyler Bateman as "Two Butchers and the Blade" in Bar Wrestling's Trios Tournament losing to SoCal Uncensored (Christopher Daniels, Frankie Kazarian, and Scorpio Sky). On August 8, 2019, they made their Progress Wrestling debut losing to Aussie Open (Kyle Fletcher and Mark Davis) in a three-way tag team match with the Dark Order (Evil Uno and Stu Grayson).

They continued to wrestle together on the independent circuit until Williams' death from on September 5, 2026.

=== Ring of Honor (2007, 2012–2015) ===
Guilmette first wrestled for Ring of Honor on April 13, 2007, defeating Mitch Franklin in a dark match. Years later, he returned to ROH on June 30, 2012, losing to Adam Cole. On February 16, 2013, Parks made his return, losing to former ROH World Tag Team Champion Charlie Haas. On the April 6, 2013, episode of Ring of Honor Wrestling, Parks was defeated by Roderick Strong. He continued to wrestle matches for Ring of Honor throughout 2014 and 2015. Parks made his final appearance for Ring of Honor on September 26, 2015, losing to Caprice Coleman on the ROH Reloaded Tour.

=== Combat Zone Wrestling (2012–2016) ===
Guilmette made his first appearance for Combat Zone Wrestling on September 8, 2012, at the promotions annual Down with the Sickness event, defeating Kekoa. He went on to make regular appearances for the promotion over the next four years. In 2015, Parks and his wife Cherry Bomb aligned themselves with BLK Jeez, and form the villainous stable known as TV Ready. On December 12, 2015, at CZW's seventeenth annual Cage of Death event, TV Ready went on to win the CZW World Tag Team Championship, defeating Dan Barry and Sozio. On May 14, 2016, TV Ready lost the CZW World Tag Team Championship to Da Hit Squad at Prelude to Violence 2016, the match was also Parks' final appearance for CZW after signing with Total Nonstop Action Wrestling.

On September 10, 2016, Guilmette returned to CZW using his Braxton Sutter ring name for their annual Down with the Sickness event, teaming with BLK Jeez as TV Ready to challenge for the CZW World Tag Team Championship against Da Hit Squad, in a losing effort.

=== House of Hardcore (2015) ===
On July 18, 2015, Parks and Cherry Bomb made their debut for Tommy Dreamer's House of Hardcore at the ninth HOH event in Toronto, Ontario, Canada. They would appear at the next four HOH events, starting a feud with Dreamer and Mickie James in the process.

=== Total Nonstop Action Wrestling / Impact Wrestling (2015–2018) ===
Guilmette initially appeared in Impact Wrestling through the company's TNA One Night Only PPV's under his Pepper Parks ring name. First appearing at the 2015 One Night Only event X-Travaganza 2015, losing against Kenny King and Jay Rios, he next appeared on 2015's Gut Check PPV, losing to Drew Galloway.

The following year on January 8, 2016; Parks appeared for the company again in the first One Night Only PPV of the year losing to Trevor Lee. He appeared for the company again for the January 19 edition of Impact Wrestling, where he suffered a loss against Mike Bennett. On March 23, Impact Wrestling announced that Guilmette had signed a contract.

On the June 7 edition of Impact Wrestling, he made his Impact debut under the name Braxton Sutter, defeating local independent wrestler Bill Callous in a singles match. On June 12, 2016, at Slammiversary, Sutter wrestled James Storm in a losing effort. On the June 21, episode of Impact Wrestling, Sutter was challenged by Rockstar Spud who had interrupted Sutter's scheduled match against indy wrestler Balam, Sutter went on to defeat Spud and following his victory, was viciously attacked by Spud. On the June 28 episode of Impact Wrestling, he won a battle-royal to become the number one contender for the Impact Wrestling X Division Championship, but was defeated by then champion Mike Bennett who invoked his match against Sutter immediately following the battle-royal. On the July 5 episode of Impact Wrestling, he participated in an Ultimate X match for the X Division Championship, in a losing effort. During the match, he broke a tooth of Rockstar Spud's, intensifying their current feud over several months. At 2016's Destination X, he competed in a six-man ladder match to be number one contender to the X Division Championship, losing to DJZ. On the September 1 edition of Impact Wrestling, Rockstar Spud viciously attacked Sutter with a chair during an Ultimate X match, and attacked him once again on the September 8 edition of Impact Wrestling after his match against Drew Galloway, breaking one of his teeth. On the September 15, Sutter defeated Rockstar Spud in an "Empty Arena, No Turnbuckles" match, ending their feud. At Bound for Glory he participated in the Bound for Gold but was eliminated first by the eventual winner Eli Drake.

On the October 6 episode of Impact Wrestling, Braxton Sutter took part in the first Team X Gold match, teaming with DJZ and Mandrews, and defeated The Helms Dynasty and Marshe Rockett. On the November 3 episode of Impact Wrestling, the team, now dubbed "Go for Broke" defeated once again The Helms Dynasty and Marshe Rockett as well as Rockstar Spud and Decay in a three-way tag team match. On the December 1 episode of Impact Wrestling, Sutter faced Mandrews and DJZ for his Impact Wrestling X Division Championship, but lost the match.

On the January 12, 2017, episode of Impact Wrestling, Sutter inserted himself into the feud between Maria Kanellis-Bennett and Allie, losing to Maria's husband Mike Bennett. The following week, Maria blackmailed him into breaking it off with Allie, after he said that she couldn't control him like everyone else. He was then forced to drive Laurel Van Ness home and later propose to her, or else Allie would be fired. On the February 23 episode of Impact Wrestling, Sutter rejected Van Ness' marriage during the ceremony when he announced that he's in love with Allie. On the March 9 episode of Impact Wrestling, Sutter defeated DJZ, Marshe Rockett and Caleb Konley in a four-way match with the help of Allie. After the match, they were confronted by an angry Laurel Van Ness who observed them from the ramp. The following week, Sutter failed to win the X Division Championship in a four-way match against Trevor Lee, DJZ and Suicide after a distraction of Laurel Van Ness. On the March 30 episode of Impact Wrestling, Sutter was defeated by Sienna's cousin, KM. On the April 13 episode of Impact Wrestling, Sutter and Allie defeated Sienna and KM. After the match, they were attacked by Sienna's surprise Kongo Kong and Laurel Van Ness. He continued feuding with Kongo Kong, Sienna, and KM. The feud culminated at the Slammiversary pre-show, where Sutter, Mahabali Shera, and Allie defeated Kongo Kong, KM, and Laurel Van Ness in a six-person tag-team match. While being off television for several months, he and Allie quietly ended their on camera relationship without any explanation.

Braxton Sutter returned on March 1, 2018, episode of Impact and turned heel, after losing his match, where he revealed that he dropped Allie like a bad habit, because she's no good and was holding his career back. He then went on to say that nobody is better than him, before being attacked by Brian Cage, to cheers from the crowd. Later that night Sutter came back out during Laurel Van Ness's segment, saying that he wanted back in, with her, but she refused. Then throughout the month of March, Braxton came out after Allie's matches, offering to take her back, while Allie kept ignoring him, until the March 22 episode of Impact, where it was revealed to be a setup, when Allie was attacked from behind by Su Yung. At Redemption, Sutter accompanied Yung in her match against Allie, but she was defeated.

On April 26, 2018, he announced that he had departed Impact Wrestling.

=== All Elite Wrestling / Ring of Honor (2019–2026) ===
Guillmette made his All Elite Wrestling (AEW) debut as The Blade on the November 27 episode of AEW Dynamite attacking Cody Rhodes, along with The Butcher, and his real-life wife, Allie (The Bunny) establishing themselves as heels. On the December 11, 2019, episode of AEW Dynamite, The Butcher and The Blade defeated Q. T. Marshall and Cody Rhodes. It was later revealed that The Butcher and The Blade had been hired by MJF, furthering his ongoing feud with Cody. On the December 11 episode of Dynamite, The Butcher won his first tag match in AEW when he and The Blade defeated Cody and Q. T. Marshall, who was handpicked by MJF.

In March 2020, The Butcher and The Blade had a brief feud with the Jurassic Express (Jungle Boy, Luchasaurus and Marko Stunt), which led to The Butcher and The Blade ending their alliance with MJF.

During the summer, The Butcher and The Blade began working with Lucha Brothers (Rey Fenix and Penta El Zero Miedo) and later, formed a group, led by Eddie Kingston. However, the group disbanded on the November 18 episode of Dynamite, after The Butcher and The Blade sided with Kingston, while the Lucha Brothers reunited their Death Triangle group with Pac, who had returned the previous week. They feuded with Pac, Penta, and Fenix for the next couple of weeks. Following AEW Revolution, The Butcher and The Blade ended their alliance with Kingston after he turned face and began teaming with Jon Moxley as they allied themselves with Matt Hardy who along with Private Party created a faction known as the Hardy Family Office.

On March 17, 2021, on a special edition of Dynamite called St. Patrick’s Day Slam, in their debut match with the HFO, The Butcher and The Blade teamed with Matt Hardy and Private Party in a victory over Bear Country and Jungle Express. On the September 15 episode of Dynamite, The Butcher and The Blade, now ranked No. 1, unsuccessfully challenged the Lucha Bros. for the AEW World Tag Team Championship. After the match, the entirety of the HFO beat down the Lucha Bros before being stopped by Santana and Ortiz. The Blade did not appear on television again until the November 10 edition of Dynamite, assisting Matt Hardy and Isiah Kassidy in assaulting Orange Cassidy, Chuck Taylor, and Wheeler Yuta after Yuta was squashed by Wardlow.

In May 2023, The Butcher and The Blade began appearing regularly for Ring of Honor (ROH). In early 2024, the Blade was sidelined with a long-term back injury. In June 2026, it was reported that the Blade and the Butcher's AEW contracts had expired, ending their near seven-year tenure with the promotion.

== Personal life ==
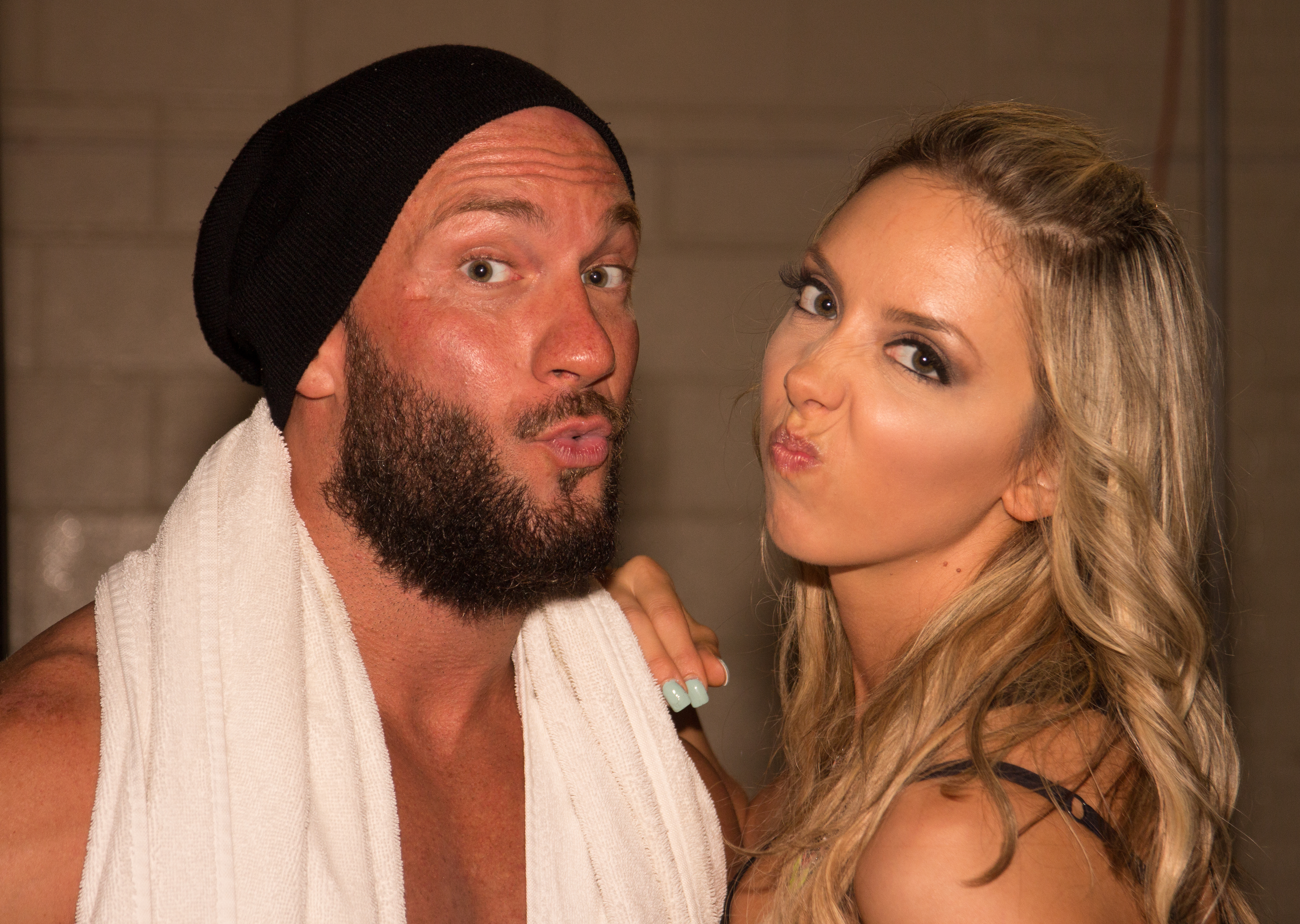
Sutter posing with his wife Allie in 2016

On September 21, 2013, Guilmette married Canadian professional wrestler Laura Dennis, better known as Cherry Bomb on the independent circuit, Allie in Impact Wrestling and All Elite Wrestling (AEW), as well as The Bunny in AEW.

Guilmette is an advocate for mental health awareness, as he has been open about his struggles with mental health and anxiety.

== Championships and accomplishments ==
- Combat Zone Wrestling
  - CZW World Tag Team Championship (1 time) – with BLK Jeez
- Empire State Wrestling
  - ESW Heavyweight Championship (1 time)
  - ESW Tag Team Championship (1 time) – with Kevin Grace
- Greektown Wrestling
  - Greektown Cup (1 time)
- Heartland Wrestling Association
  - HWA Heavyweight Championship (2 times)
  - HWA Cruiserweight Championship (1 time)
  - HWA Tag Team Championship (1 time) – with Chet Jablonski
- National Wrestling Alliance
  - NWA National Heavyweight Championship (1 time)
  - NWA Empire Heavyweight Championship (1 time)
- Pro Wrestling Illustrated
  - PWI ranked him No. 139 of the top 500 singles wrestlers in the PWI 500 in 2017
- Pro Wrestling Rampage
  - PWR Tag Team Championship (1 time) – with Andy Williams
- Pro Wrestling Xtreme
  - PWX X-Division Championship (1 time)
- Smash Wrestling
  - F8tful Eight (2016) – with Mike Rollins
  - Smash Wrestling Tag Team Championship (1 time) – with Mike Rollins
- Squared Circle Wrestling
  - SCW Premier Championship (1 time)
  - SCW Premier Championship Tournament (2011)
- Upstate Pro Wrestling
  - NWA New York Heavyweight Championship (1 time)
