= HWA Television Championship =

Professional wrestling championship

Details
- Promotion: Heartland Wrestling Association
- Date established: January 6, 2004
- Date retired: August 30, 2008
Statistics
- First champion(s): Quinten Lee
- Most reigns: Quinten Lee (4)
- Longest reign: Matt Stryker (189 days)
- Shortest reign: Brian Jennings (<1 day)

The HWA Television Championship was a title contested in the Heartland Wrestling Association. It was introduced on January 6, 2004 when the HWA Cruiserweight Championship was renamed. Quinten Lee was made the HWA Television Championship as he was the then HWA Cruiserweight Champion. Granger was the final champion as the title was retired on August 30, 2008 when the HWA Cruiserweight Championship was re-activated.

== Title history ==
#	Order in reign history
Reign	The reign number for the specific set of wrestlers listed
<1	Indicates reign is less than one day
—	Used for vacated reigns so as not to count it as an official reign

#	Champion	Reign	Date	Days held	Location	Notes	Ref
1	Quinten Lee	1	January 6, 2004	35	Cincinnati, OH	Was named champion as he was the then HWA Cruiserweight Champion.	
2	Mike Desire	1	February 10, 2004	35	Cincinnati, OH	Beat Lee at an HWA TV taping.	
3	Quinten Lee	2	March 16, 2004	49	Cincinnati, OH		
4	Gotti	1	May 4, 2004	42	Cincinnati, OH		
5	Tack	1	June 15, 2004	42	Cincinnati, OH		
6	Rory Fox	1	July 27, 2004	21	Cincinnati, OH	Fox pinned Tack in Six Man Tag Team Match.	
7	Tack	2	August 17, 2004	56	Cincinnati, OH		
8	J.T. Stahr	1	October 12, 2004	28	Cincinnati, OH		
9	Deuce	1	November 9, 2004	63	Cincinnati, OH		
10	Brian Beech	1	January 4, 2005	7	Cincinnati, OH		
11	Chad Collyer	1	January 11, 2005	7	Cincinnati, OH		
12	Quinten Lee	3	January 18, 2005	56	Cincinnati, OH		
13	Ala Hussein	1	March 15, 2005	14	Cincinnati, OH		
14	Super Zeta	1	March 29, 2005	28	Cincinnati, OH		
15	The Hussla	1	April 26, 2005	7	Cincinnati, OH		
17	Tack	3	May 3, 2005	35	Cincinnati, OH		
18	Rob Matrix	1	June 7, 2005	49	Cincinnati, OH		
19	Lotus	1	July 26, 2005	59	Cincinnati, OH		
20	Crazy J	1	September 23, 2005	25	Cincinnati, OH		
21	Rory Fox	2	October 18, 2005	21	Cincinnati, OH		
22	Matt Stryker	1	November 8, 2005	189	Cincinnati, OH		
23	Brad Smith	1	May 16, 2006	70	Cincinnati, OH		
—	Vacated	—	July 25, 2006	—	—		
24	J.T. Stahr	2	August 19, 2006	31	Dayton, OH	Defeated Dr. Bones in a tournament final.	
25	Scottie Murray	1	September 19, 2006	31	Cincinnati, OH	Murray pinned J.T. Stahr in Six Man Tag Team Match with the title changing hands if Murray's team won.	
26	J.T. Stahr	3	October 20, 2006	18	Cincinnati, OH	Stahr pinned Scottie Murray in a three way match to win the title. Tarek The Great was also in the match.	
27	Gotti	2	November 7, 2006	14	Cincinnati, OH	Wins four way match against Murry, Stahr, and Tarek the Great	
28	Brian Jennings	1	November 21, 2006	<1	Cincinnati, OH	Jennings vacated the title in order to compete for the HWA Heavyweight Championship.	
29	Ganger	1	December 19, 2006	147	Cincinnati, OH	Defeated Scottie Murray to win the vacant title.	
30	Quinten Lee	4	May 15, 2007	21	Cincinnati, OH		
31	Ganger	2	June 5, 2007	67	Cincinnati, OH	Title became vacant on August 11.	
—	Title Retired	—	August 30, 2008	—	Cincinnati, OH	The title was officially retired when the HWA Cruiserweight Championship was re-activated.	

== Combined reigns ==
<1	Indicates reign is less than one day

Rank	Champion	No. of reigns	Combined days
1	Ganger	2	214
2	Matt Stryker	1	189
3	Quinten Lee	4	161
4	Tack	3	133
5	J.T. Stahr	3	77
6	Deuce	1	63
7	Lotus	1	59
8	Gotti	2	56
9	Rob Matrix	1	49
10	Rory Fox	2	42
11	Mike Desire	1	35
12	Scottie Murray	1	31
13	Crazy J	1	25
14	Ala Hussein	1	14
15	Brian Beech	1	7
15	Chad Collyer	1	7
15	The Hussla		7
18	Brian Jennings	1	<1

== See also ==
- Heartland Wrestling Association
