= HWA Cruiserweight Championship =

Details
- Promotion: Heartland Wrestling Association
- Date established: August 22, 1997
- Date retired: January 6, 2004 and June 10, 2009
Statistics
- First champion: Tarik the Great
- Most reigns: Rory Fox (5 reigns)
- Longest reign: Tark The Great (1 year, 6 months, 6 days)
- Shortest reign: Rory Fox (<1 day)

The HWA Cruiserweight Championship was a title contested in the Heartland Wrestling Association. It was introduced on August 22, 1997 when Tarek The Great became the first champion. On January 6, 2004 it was retired and renamed to the HWA Television Championship. The title was re-activated on August 30, 2008 and Aaron Williams became the first champion since the re-activation. But on June 10, 2009 it was retired a second time and was again renamed, this time to the HWA American Luchadore Championship. Williams remained the champion as a result.

== Title history ==
#	Order in reign history
Reign	The reign number for the specific set of wrestlers listed
—	Used for vacated reigns so as not to count it as an official reign

#	Champion	Reign	Date	Days held	Location	Notes
1	Tarik the Great	1	August 22, 1997	555	Harveysburg, OH	Tarek defeated El Piranha in the finals of a tournament to crown the first champion.
2	Bobby Kane	1	February 27, 1999	89	Hamilton, OH	Kane defeated Tarek and Shark Boy in a 3-way match for the title.
3	Shark Boy	1	May 26, 1999	64	Fort Mitchell, KY	
—	Vacated	—	July 28, 1999	—	—	Shark Boy vacates the title after signing with WCW.
4	Todd Morton	1	August 25, 1999	179	Fort Mitchell, KY	Morton defeated Rory Fox in the finals of a tournament for the vacant title.
—	Vacated	—	February 19, 2000	—	Hamilton, OH	Morton vacates the title after no-showing the event.
5	Shark Boy	2	February 19, 2000	232	Hamilton, OH	Shark Boy defeated Matt Stryker, who won a battle royal earlier in the night, for the vacant title.
6	Rory Fox	1	October 7, 2000	29	Blanchester, OH	Fox wins the title in a Ladder Match.
7	Shark Boy	3	November 4, 2000	123	Blanchester, OH	Shark Boy pinned Fox in a tag team match where the title would change hands if Fox was pinned. Shark Boy was partnered with Race Steele while Fox was with Chip Fairway.
—	Vacated	—	March 6, 2001	—	—	Shark Boy vacates the title after winning the HWA Heavyweight Championship on February 27.
8	Matt Stryker	1	March 16, 2001	103	Rising Sun, IN	Defeated Pepper Parks to win the vacant championship.
9	Pepper Parks	1	June 26, 2001	45	Cincinnati, OH	
10	Matt Stryker	1	August 9, 2001	25	Cincinnati, OH	Stryker defeated Pepper Parks, Shark Boy and Chad Collyer in a 4-way match for the title.
11	Jamie Knoble	1	September 2, 2001	130	Jeffersonville, IN	
12	Shannon Moore	1	January 9, 2002	36	Dayton, OH	
13	Chad Collyer	1	February 13, 2002	40	Dayton, OH	Collyer defeated Moore and Matt Stryker in a 3-way match for the title.
14	Shannon Moore	2	March 24, 2002	46	Jeffersonville, IN	
15	B. J. Whitmer	1	May 8, 2002	154	Dayton, OH	Whitmer defeated Moore, Jamie Knoble and Matt Stryker in a 4-way elimination match for the title.
16	Rory Fox	2	October 8, 2002	37	Cincinnati, OH	
17	The Hussla	1	November 13, 2002	81	Englewood, OH	
18	Rory Fox	3	February 1, 2003	112	Batavia, OH	
19	J.T. Stahr	1	May 23, 2003	2	Dayton, OH	Stahr and Dalton become co-champions in a 4-way match when both competitors pinned Fox at the same time.
20	Rory Fox	4	May 25, 2003	105	Cincinnati, OH	Fox pinned both Stahr & Dalton in a handicap elimination match.
21	Quinten Lee	1	September 6, 2003	53	Batavia, OH	
22	Rory Fox	5	October 28, 2003		Cincinnati, OH	Fox defeated El Temor, who was actually Quinten Lee under a mask.
23	Quinten Lee	2	October 28, 2003	71	Cincinnati, OH	
—	Retired	—	January 6, 2004	—	—	The title is renamed the HWA Television Championship on January 6, 2004.
—	Title Re-activated	—	August 30, 2008	—	—	
24	Aaron Williams	1	August 30, 2008	203	Cincinnati, OH	Won a five-man elimination match which included Dave Crist, Johnny Gargano, The Solution, and Dustin Rayz.
25	Tim Donst	1	March 20, 2009	52	Middletown, OH	Won a six-man winner take all match.
26	Aaron Williams	2	May 20, 2009	12	Middletown, OH	Won a four-man elimination match which included Andre Hart, V-Rad, and Mr. Jacko. Tim Donst was stripped after not defending it within 30 days earlier in the night.
—	Retired	—	June 10, 2009	—	Middletown, OH	HWA President Tim Tatum changes the Cruiserweight Championship to the HWA American Luchacore Championship.

== List of combined reigns ==
Rank	Wrestler	# Of Reigns	Combined Days
1.	Tarik The Great	1	555
2.	Shark Boy	2	419
3.	Rory Fox	5	283
4.	Aaron Williams	2	215
5.	Todd Morton	1	179
6.	B. J. Whitmer	1	154
7.	Jamie Noble	1	130
8.	Matt Stryker	2	128
9.	Quinten Lee	2	124
10.	Bobby Kane	1	89
11.	Shannon Moore	2	82
12.	The Hussla	1	81
13.	Tim Donst	1	52
14.	Pepper Parks	1	45
15.	Chad Collyer	1	40
16.	J.T. Sthar	1	2

== See also ==
- Heartland Wrestling Association
- HWA American Luchacore Championship
