= Chad Collyer =

American magician, mentalist and professional wrestler (born 1974)

Personal information
- Born: Chad Collyer; December 12, 1974 (age 51) Richmond, Indiana, U.S.
- Education: Manchester University

Professional wrestling career
- Ring name(s): Chad Collyer; The Metal Master; The Stealth; Chad Malenko
- Billed height: 5 ft 11 in (180 cm)
- Billed weight: 230 lb (104 kg)
- Billed from: Richmond, Indiana
- Trained by: Dean Malenko; Tom Prichard
- Debut: December 6, 1997
- Retired: 2016

Chad Collyer (born December 12, 1974) is an American retired professional wrestler.

== Professional wrestling career ==
Collyer attended Manchester College, where he earned a Bachelor of Science degree. He was an accomplished amateur wrestler, winning multiple championships over an eleven-year period, but decided to turn professional and continue his amateur career at Manchester College during his freshman year.

Upon graduation, Collyer traveled to Tampa, Florida to train at the Malenko Pro Wrestling School under Dean Malenko and Jeff Bradley. Collyer began training on August 3, 1997. He debuted on December 6, 1997, at Kahuna's Bar and Grill in St. Petersburg, Florida, facing Jet Jaguar.

In 2000, Collyer toured England twice with Scott Conway's Wrestling Alliance. He returned to England in 2001 and September 2002, competing for Brian Dixon's All Star Promotions.

In 2002, Collyer returned to Japan, where he had worked previously in 1999, facing Tiger Mask. He wrestled for Michinoku Pro Wrestling between June 2002 and March 2003 as The Metal Master, a masked gladiator. He feuded with Great Sasuke over the NWA World Middleweight Championship, but was unable to defeat the veteran. Collyer also appeared for MPW as The Stealth, and for New Japan Pro-Wrestling and BattlARTS as Chad Malenko, in honor of one of his trainers, Dean Malenko. In the mid-2000s, Collyer wrestled a match for Cleveland All-Pro Wrestling in a winning effort against CM Punk.

=== Heartland Wrestling Association (1997–2009, 2011–2012) ===
Collyer debuted in the Midwestern Heartland Wrestling Association immediately after debuting. In 1998, Collyer teamed with Shark Boy on a number of occasions. In 1999, Collyer and Shark Boy began feuding with "Bad Boy" Bobby Kane and Tarek the Great. On March 6, 1999, and April 3, 1999, Collyer unsuccessfully challenged Kane for the HWA Cruiserweight Championship.

Collyer received a third title shot on March 25, 2000, losing to Shark Boy by disqualification after Matt Stryker interfered on his behalf. Stryker and Collyer subsequently aligned themselves with valet Hellena Heavenly, forming a tag team known as "Hellena's Hunks". Over the following weeks, Stryker and Heavenly vied with Shark Boy while Collyer toured Japan. Collyer returned to the HWA in July 2000, wrestling Shark Boy on a number of occasions, yet failing to win the HWA Cruiserweight Championship. On September 30, 2000, Shark Boy defeated Collyer in a last man standing match.

On October 27, 2000, Collyer unsuccessfully challenged Race Steele for the HWA Heavyweight Championship. He defeated Steele on January 26, 2001, thus winning his first title, the HWA Heavyweight Championship. He held the title for just over month before being stripped of it on February 27, 2001, upon embarking upon a six-week tour to England.

Collyer returned to the HWA in July 2001. On August 9, 2001, he wrestled at the third annual Brian Pillman Memorial Show, taking part in a four way bout for the HWA Cruiserweight Championship. Throughout the remainder of 2001, Collyer wrestled a number of World Championship Wrestling wrestlers who had been assigned to the HWA (a World Wrestling Federation developmental territory) upon the purchase of WCW by the WWF.

In January 2002, Collyer lost a best of three series for the number one contendership to the HWA Cruiserweight Championship to Stryker. In late January, Collyer began feuding with the Cruiserweight Champion Shannon Moore. He conceded several matches before defeating Moore and Stryker in a three way bout to win the HWA Cruiserweight Championship on February 13, 2002. Moore and Collyer subsequently engaged in a best of seven series, with Moore winning the deciding bout and the Cruiserweight Championship on March 24, 2002. On April 7, 2002, Hellena Heavenly claimed that she was pregnant, with numerous wrestlers claiming that they were the father. Over the following weeks, Collyer faced each of the claimants.

Collyer was subsequently largely inactive in the HWA until 2003. On May 2, 2003, Collyer won a Royal Rumble match with the HWA Heavyweight Championship on the line. He lost the title to Nigel McGuinness on September 6, 2003. Following his loss, Collyer appeared intermittently with the HWA until January 11, 2005, when he defeated Brian Beech for the HWA Television Championship. He lost the title to "High IQ" Quinten Lee on January 18, 2005. Collyer subsequently appeared sporadically with the HWA throughout 2005, wrestling Stryker and James Gibson in technical bouts, and briefly feuding with Cody Hawk in August 2005.

Following a lengthy absence, Collyer returned to the HWA on March 19, 2006, wrestling Nigel McGuinness at the Internet pay-per-view CyberClash. Collyer won his third HWA Heavyweight Championship on August 29, 2006, defeating Jon Moxley. He lost the title to Pepper Parks on November 7, 2006. After failing to regain the title in a two out of three falls match on November 18, 2006, at the November to Dismember event, Collyer formed a tag team with Nigel McGuinness.

Collyer wrestled his final match took place in April 2012 during the HWA's second annual Heartland Cup.

=== World Wrestling Federation/Entertainment (2000–2005, 2007–2009) ===
Collyer made his first appearance with the World Wrestling Federation (WWF) on the September 23, 2000 episode of Jakked, losing to Perry Saturn. He made two further appearances on Jakked in January 2001 and February 2001, losing on both occasions.

On April 5, 2002, Collyer signed a three-year developmental deal with the World Wrestling Federation. He was subsequently assigned to the Heartland Wrestling Association developmental territory. While under contract, Collyer furthered his training under Les Thatcher and Tom Prichard, although he was skeptical of the WWF's request that he take acting classes. He was released by the WWF in July 2002.

Despite being released, Collyer made several appearances for the now renamed World Wrestling Entertainment (WWE) in 2003 and 2004, jobbing on Heat, Velocity and in dark matches. In 2009, Collyer appeared on the May 12 episode of WWE's ECW, where he jobbed to Vladimir Kozlov.

=== Total Nonstop Action Wrestling (2003–2004) ===
Collyer debuted in Total Nonstop Action Wrestling on the October 18, 2003 episode of TNA Xplosion, losing to Chris Sabin. He went on to appear on the November 12, 2003 episode of Xplosion, losing to Sonjay Dutt. On the January 28, 2004 weekly TNA pay-per-view, Collyer, Eric Young, Matt Stryker and Shark Boy lost to Team Mexico in an eight-man tag team bout.

Collyer returned to TNA on June 16, 2004, as one-third of The Elite Guard, a stable consisting of Collyer, Hotstuff Hernandez and Onyx. The Elite Guard were portrayed as a militant and superior antithesis to the 3 Live Kru, who were feuding with Jeff Jarrett and assisted Jarrett in his feud with the Kru. The 3Live Kru and The Elite Guard feuded over the following weeks, culminating in a ten-man Guitar on a Pole match on July 14, 2004, that saw Dusty Rhodes, Larry Zbyszko and the 3Live Kru defeat Jarrett, Ken Shamrock and The Elite Guard when Rhodes pinned Onyx. Following the loss, The Elite Guard was removed from TNA television. In Collyer's TNA match on July 30, 2004, he and Hernandez were defeated by America's Most Wanted in a dark match. He also appeared in the 20 Man Gauntlet for the Gold on the August 11, 2004 Pay Per View

=== Ring of Honor (2003–2006) ===
Collyer debuted in Ring of Honor at Night of the Butcher, losing to Bryan Danielson. He would then return to defeat Matt Stryker at Revenge on the Prophecy in January, 2003. He appeared with ROH sporadically over the following 16 months, wrestling Stryker on a number of occasions. On June 12, 2004, at World Title Classic, Collyer faced Hydro, Superstar Steve and Ray Gordy in a Four Corner Survival match, with the stipulation being that the winner would take part in the Pure Wrestling Championship tournament in July 2004. The match was won by Hydro.

In late 2004, Ricky Steamboat, an advocate of technical wrestling, began feuding with Mick Foley, a proponent of hardcore wrestling, with Collyer taking the side of Steamboat along with other mat-based wrestlers such as Nigel McGuinness. On October 16, 2004, at Joe vs. Punk II, Collyer and McGuinness (accompanied by Steamboat) defeated B. J. Whitmer and Dan Maff (accompanied by Foley). Collyer and McGuinness subsequently teamed on several occasions, unsuccessfully challenging the Havana Pitbulls for the Tag Team Championship on December 4, 2004, at All-Star Extravaganza II.

Following a four-month absence, Collyer returned to ROH on May 13, 2005, at The Final Showdown, teaming with McGuinness in a loss to Colt Cabana and Doug Williams. On August 12, 2005, Collyer and McGuinness unsuccessfully challenged B. J. Whitmer and Jimmy Jacobs for the Tag Team Championship. In November 2005, Collyer began feuding with Ace Steel. The feud culminated in a First Blood match on March 31, 2006, at Super Card of Honor, which was won by Steel.

Collyer made several further appearances with ROH throughout 2006. His final match, on August 13, 2006, at Anarchy in the UK, saw him team with The Kings of Wrestling in a loss to Colt Cabana, Nigel McGuiness and Robbie Brookside.

=== All Star Wrestling (2000–2002, 2004–2011, 2015) ===
Chad often tours the UK with All Star Wrestling in England, working as a heel. However, his character became a comedic character, with most of his matches being comedy sketches. He has wrestled the likes of Dean Allmark, Marty Scurll, James Mason, the Zebra Kid and Doug Williams.

After retiring in 2012, Collyer returned to professional wrestling in July 2015 and wrestled a number of matches for ASW until his final match on September 12.

=== Ohio Valley Wrestling (2009–2010) ===
In July 2009, Collyer debuted in Ohio Valley Wrestling (OVW) under his Metal Master gimmick, in which he defeated then-OVW Television Champion Jamin Olivencia in a non-title match. The Metal Master would eventually win the Television Championship from Mohammad Ali Vaez on September 15, 2010. He held the title for 47 days before losing the title in a rematch.

== Personal life ==
In 2011, Collyer began performing as a magician and mentalist.

== Championships and accomplishments ==
=== Collegiate wrestling ===
- Indiana Collegiate Athletic Conference
  - ICAC Conference Champion (3 times)
- Manchester College personal awards
  - 1997 Jim Gratz Leadership Award
  - 1997 Spartan Desire Award
- National Collegiate Athletic Association
  - 1995 NCAA Division III National Finalist (150 lb)
  - 1997 NCAA Division III National Finalist (158 lb)
  - 1995 NCAA Division III West Regional Champion (150 lb)

=== Professional wrestling ===
- Cleveland All-Pro Wrestling
  - CAPW Heavyweight Championship (1 time)
- Heartland Wrestling Association
  - HWA Cruiserweight Championship (1 time)
  - HWA Heavyweight Championship (3 times)
  - HWA Television Championship (1 time)
- NWA Indiana
  - NWA Indiana Heavyweight Championship (1 time)
  - NWA Indiana Heritage Championship (1 time)
- Ohio Valley Wrestling
  - OVW Television Championship (1 time)
- Pro Wrestling Illustrated
  - PWI ranked him #154 of the top 500 singles wrestlers in the PWI 500 in 2004

== See also ==
- List of Jewish professional wrestlers
