= B. J. Whitmer =

American professional wrestler and producer (born 1978)

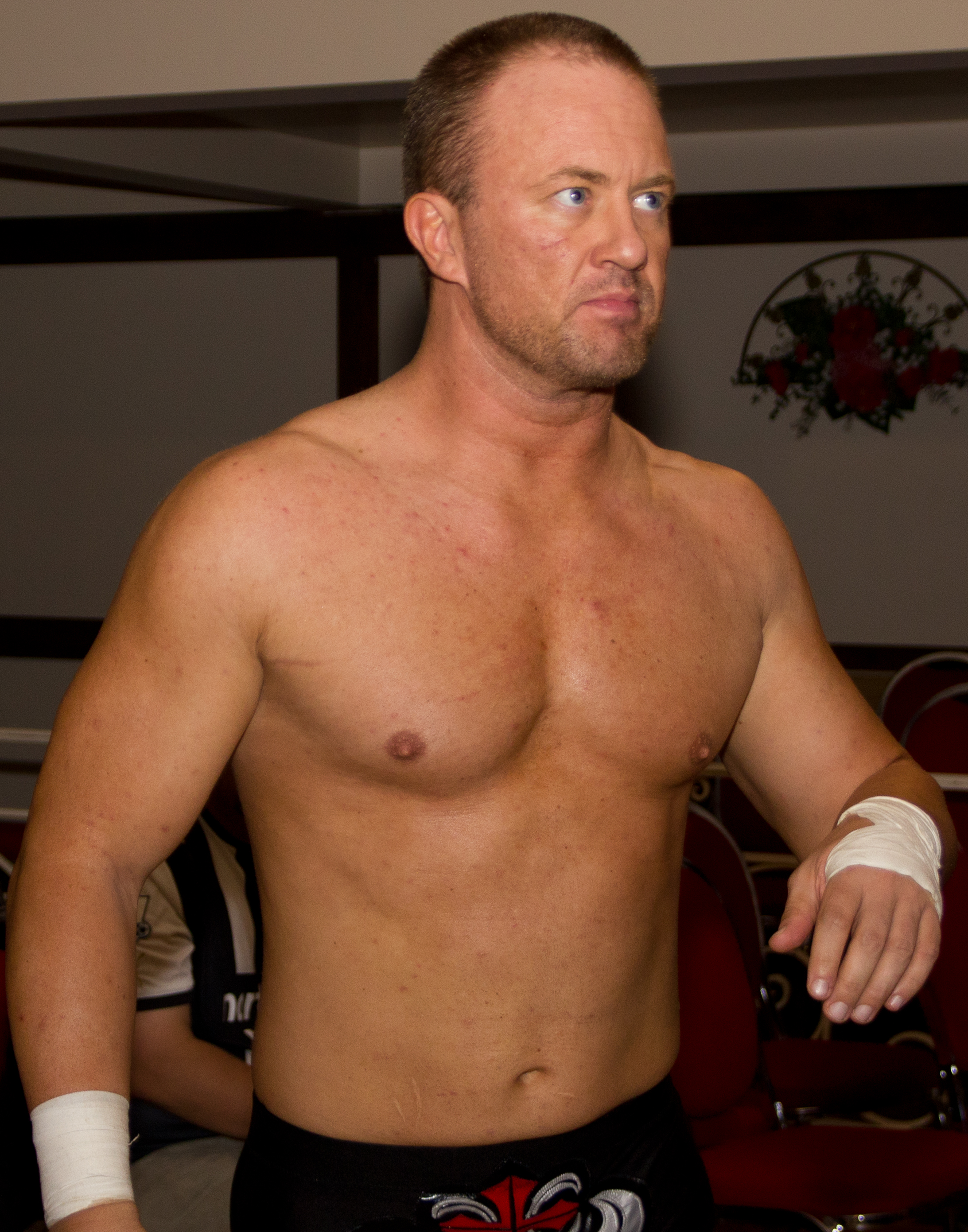
- Whitmer in 2012

Personal information
- Born: Benjamin Whitmer; January 25, 1978 (age 48) Owensboro, Kentucky, U.S.

Professional wrestling career
- Ring name: B. J. Whitmer
- Billed height: 6 ft 1 in (185 cm)
- Billed weight: 235 lb (107 kg)
- Billed from: Owensboro, Kentucky
- Trained by: Les Thatcher; Ian Rotten
- Debut: January 23, 2000
- Retired: 2017

Benjamin Whitmer (born January 25, 1978), better known by the ring name B. J. Whitmer, is an American professional wrestling producer, professional wrestling trainer, color commentator, and retired professional wrestler. He is best known for his work in Ring of Honor (ROH), where he is a four-time ROH World Tag Team Champion.

== Professional wrestling career ==
=== Early career (2000–2005) ===
Whitmer was trained by Les Thatcher and debuted on January 23, 2000, in Thatcher's Ohio-based Heartland Wrestling Association. Whitmer feuded with "Ice Cream Man" Tony B. before forming a tag team with Jamie Knoble in 2002. On May 8, 2002, he won the HWA Cruiserweight Championship by defeating Knoble, Shannon Moore, and Matt Stryker in a four-man elimination match. He lost the title to Rory Fox on August 10.

In addition to the HWA, Whitmer also began performing for Independent Wrestling Association Mid-South. After being unsuccessful in winning the inaugural Sweet Science Sixteen tournament and then again in 2001, Whitmer won the now-renamed Ted Petty Invitational in 2002 as well as the Revolution Strong Style Tournament that same year. On April 9, 2004, he defeated Jerry Lynn in a thirty-minute Iron Man match for the IWA Mid-South Heavyweight Championship, which he held until May 29 when he was defeated by Petey Williams.

In June 2001, Whitmer toured Japan with Pro Wrestling Noah, teaming on several occasions with fellow gaijins Matt Murphy and 2 Cold Scorpio. He was entered in the GHC Junior Tournament, but was eliminated by Tsuyoshi Kikuchi in his final match in Japan on June 21 in Toyama, Toyama. Whitmer toured with Noah once more in August and September 2005, losing most of his matches. His last appearance in Noah featured him in a three-way match for the ROH World Championship against Kenta and the then-reigning champion Nigel McGuinness.

=== Ring of Honor (2003–2008) ===
==== The Prophecy; teaming with Dan Maff (2003–2005) ====
Whitmer debuted in Ring of Honor in January 2003 at Revenge on the Prophecy. His first major match was a bout with CM Punk at Epic Encounter on April 12, 2003. The match was declared a no-contest after Punk gave Whitmer a German suplex off the ring apron and through a table on the outside, leaving Punk stunned and Whitmer concussed. Whitmer returned on May 31, losing to Dan Maff, and on June 14 he teamed with Punk's other enemy, Raven, to face CM Punk and Colt Cabana at Night of The Grudges. Whitmer and Raven lost when Cabana pinned Whitmer, apparently settling the issue.

Whitmer regained some momentum with a victory in a four corners survival match on June 28 at WrestleRave, and on July 19 at Death Before Dishonor, he won another four corners survival match to become the number one contender for the ROH Championship on the line. Whitmer faced the reigning champion, Samoa Joe, at Wrath of the Racket on August 9, but was defeated. Between August and November, Whitmer took part in the Field of Honor event, where he won his block but lost in the finals to Matt Stryker on December 22 at Final Battle.

That same evening, CM Punk confronted Christopher Daniels, Dan Maff and Allison Danger, members of The Prophecy, a heel stable led by Daniels, demanding to know which one of them had attacked and sidelined his girlfriend and valet, Lucy, earlier that year. A brawl broke out with The Prophecy on one side and Punk and Colt Cabana on the other. Whitmer then approached the ring and announced that he had been behind the attack, thus joining The Prophecy. The events on December 22 led to a match on January 10, 2004, at The Battle Lines Are Drawn between The Second City Saints (Punk, Cabana and Ace Steel) and The Prophecy (Daniels, Maff and Whitmer). The match descended into a brawl, and the referee declared it a no contest after Lucy returned to ROH for one night, slapping Whitmer to gain a measure of revenge. After the match, Punk injured Daniels (in reality, Daniels had signed a contract with Total Nonstop Action Wrestling) after performing the Pepsi Plunge through a table, marking Daniels' last appearance in ROH until June 2005.

Whitmer and Maff continued to team together as The Prophecy, accompanied by Allison Danger, and feuded with the Saints throughout early 2004. They defeated the Saints for the ROH World Tag Team Championship at Round Robin Challenge III on May 15, but lost the title to the Briscoe Brothers later that evening. On June 12, 2004, at World Title Classic, Maff and Whitmer defeated three other teams in a thirty-five-minute-long ultimate endurance match. After the match, Maff convinced Whitmer to discard both The Prophecy's name and the managerial services of Allison Danger, claiming that they no longer needed a leader or a manager and resulting in both men turning face. Furious over this turn of events, Danger subsequently placed a bounty on the heads of Maff and Whitmer. They spent several months feuding with teams sent after them by Danger, including Slash Venom and Chicano and the Carnage Crew. On December 26 at Final Battle 2004, they defeated the Carnage Crew in a "Fight Without Honor", and shook hands with their opponents after the match. However, Whitmer injured his elbow in the course of the match, and was sidelined for two months. Whitmer and Maff captured the Tag Team Championship for a second time on February 19, 2005, defeating the Havana Pitbulls.

==== Teaming and feuding with Jimmy Jacobs (2005–2006) ====
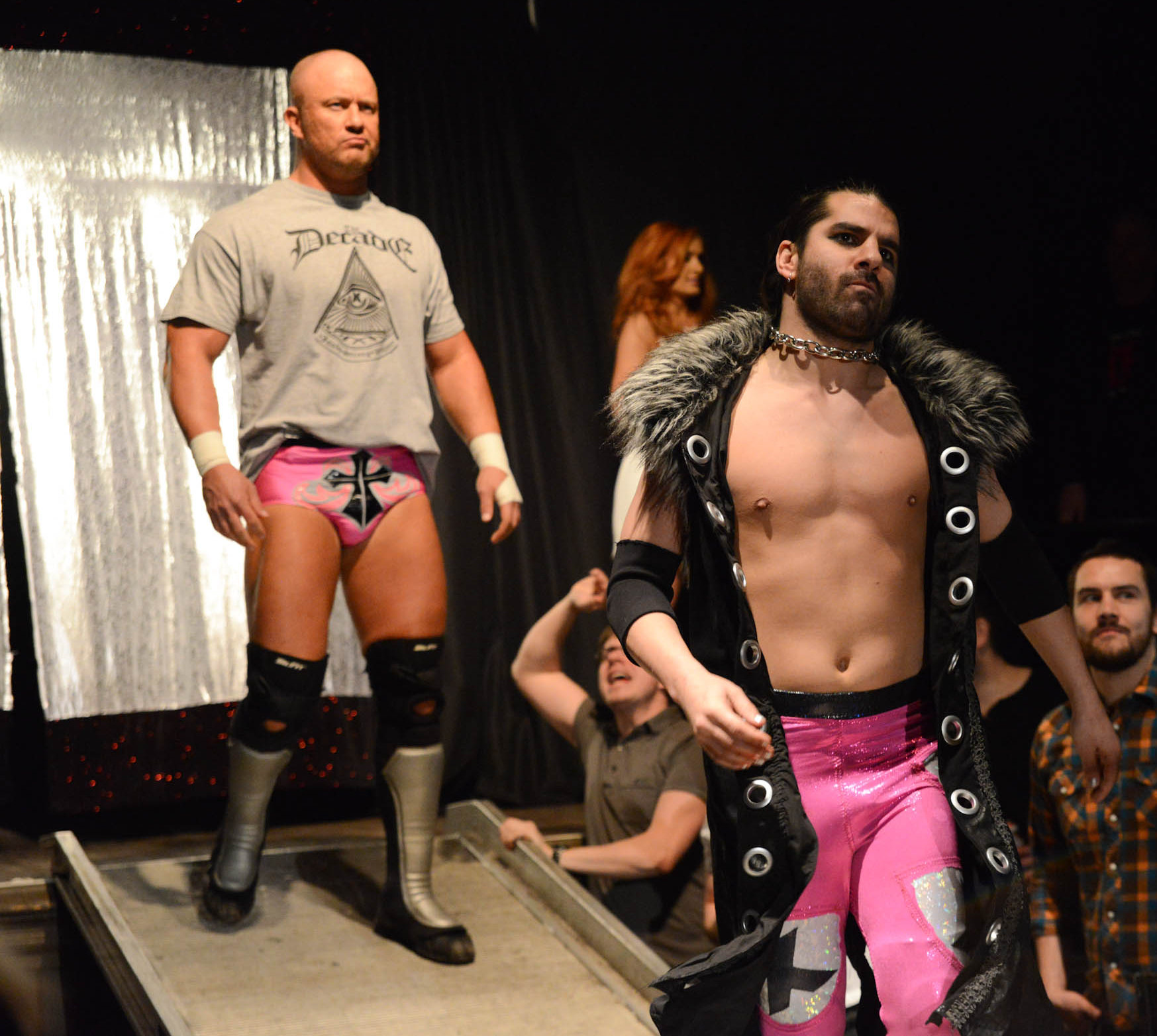
Whitmer (left) with Jimmy Jacobs

After Maff left ROH, the title was vacated. Whitmer formed a new team with Jimmy Jacobs, and defeated Samoa Joe and Jay Lethal in a match for the vacant title on April 2. They lost the title to The Carnage Crew on July 9 at Escape from New York, but regained it two weeks later on July 23 at The Homecoming. The duo went on to lose the title again, this time to the team of Sal Rinauro and Tony Mamaluke, on October 1, 2005.

On October 2, 2005, at Unforgettable, Whitmer and Jacobs joined manager Lacey to become the Lacey's Angels. On the ROH DVD release of Hell Freezes Over, a video segment piloted by Jimmy Jacobs revealed that Jacobs was in fact in love with Lacey. Focusing more on his love of Lacey rather than his effort in matches, Jacobs cost the Lacey's Angels team (also joined by Adam Pearce for the night) the victory at Tag Wars. Jacobs also cost himself and Whitmer the Tag Team Title the following night at Dissension against the champions Roderick Strong and Austin Aries. After this, Whitmer turned on Jacobs. It was also learned later on in the DVD release in a video segment that Whitmer quit Lacey's Angels altogether.

Whitmer suffered an ankle injury due to Jacobs and was kept out of action, but appeared at Survival of the Fittest 2006 to attack Jacobs during his tag match with Colt Cabana against Chris Hero and Claudio Castagnoli. Along with Cabana and Daizee Haze, Whitmer began feuding with Lacey, Jacobs, and their hired enforcer Brent Albright in a series of violent matches, including one at Final Battle, where Albright put Whitmer through a table with a powerbomb. The feud continued into early 2007, and saw Whitmer perform an exploder superplex on Albright through a table in New York on February 16.

==== The Hangmen Three (2007–2008) ====
On February 23, 2007, Whitmer lost to Takeshi Morishima in a match for the ROH World Championship in Dayton, Ohio. In September 2007, he allied with Brent Albright and Adam Pearce to form The Hangmen Three (also spelled as The Hangm3n), which later saw them gain Shane Hagadorn as their manager. While a member of The Hangmen Three, Whitmer challenged for the World Tag Team Championship on a number of occasions with either Pearce or Albright, but was unsuccessful in regaining the title. In March 2008, Albright and Pearce joined Sweet 'n' Sour Inc., prompting Whitmer to leave The Hangmen Three. Later that month, ROH announced that Whitmer had resigned from the promotion, praising his "immense contribution".

=== Independent circuit (2008, 2011–2012) ===
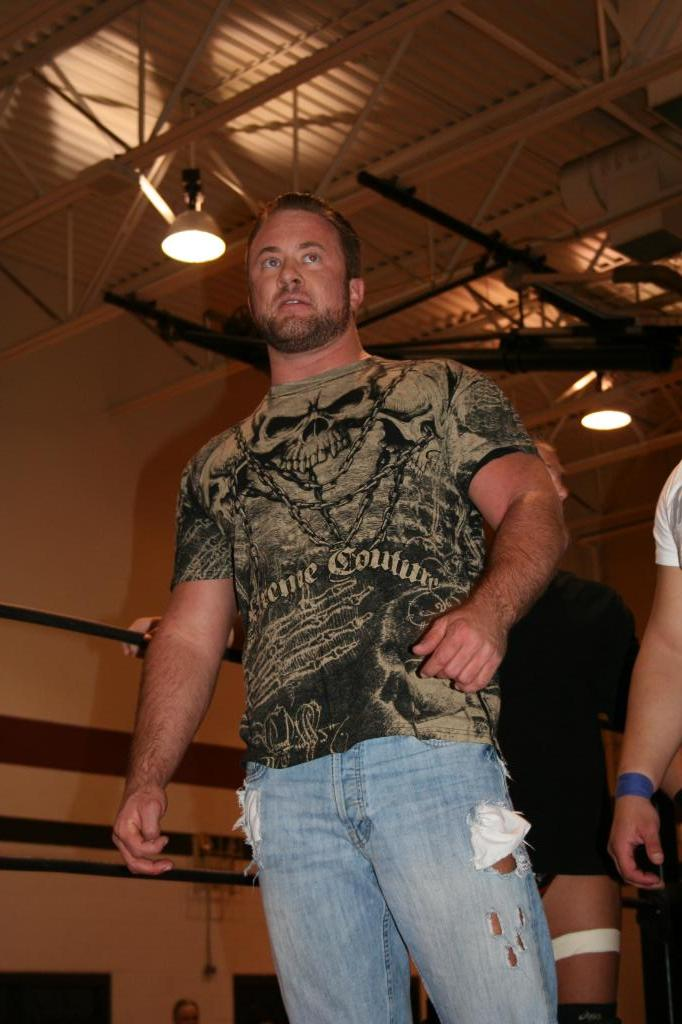
Whitmer in 2008

Whitmer retired from professional wrestling shortly after leaving Ring of Honor in 2008. However, Whitmer would make his return to the ring on March 19, 2011, where he returned to the Heartland Wrestling Association and defeated Gerome Phillips to win his second HWA Heavyweight Championship, which he held until losing it to Jesse Emerson on August 27. The following month, it was announced that Whitmer was going to be taking part in Absolute Intense Wrestling's TPI tournament, not to be confused with the Ted Petty Invitational held by Independent Wrestling Association Mid-South. He would be eliminated from the tournament in the semifinals by Tim Donst. On September 9, Whitmer made his debut for Dragon Gate USA, competing in a six-way elimination match, which was won by Brodie Lee. One week later, Whitmer returned to Independent Wrestling Association Mid-South and defeated Bucky Collins to win the vacant IWA Mid-South Light Heavyweight Championship, which he held until losing it to Collins on October 14. Whitmer's first internet pay-per-view appearance for Dragon Gate USA took place on November 11 at Revolt, where he defeated Vinny Marseglia. Two days later at Freedom Fight 2011, Whitmer was defeated by Brodie Lee in a singles match.

=== Return to Ring of Honor (2012–2018, 2022) ===
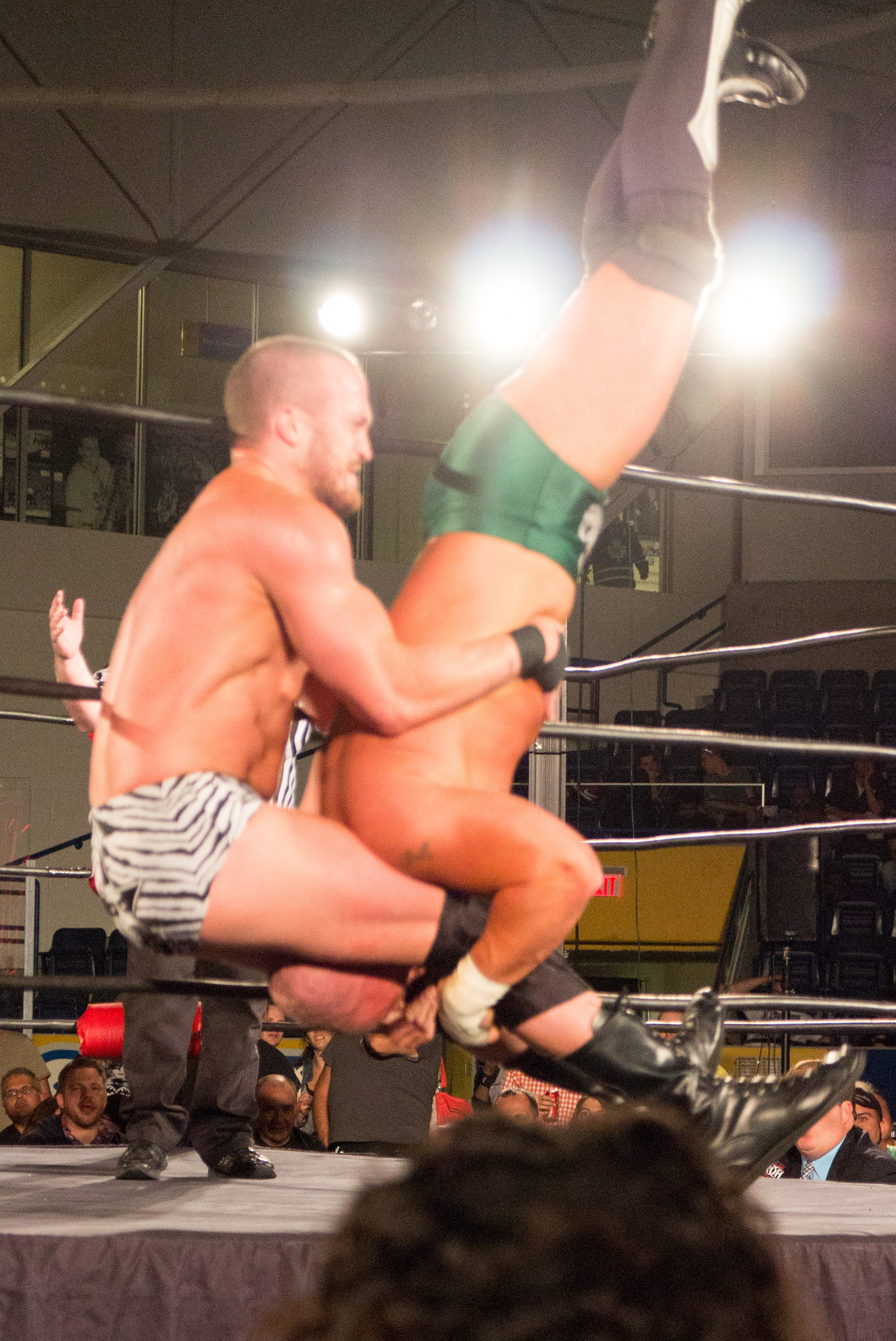
This piledriver onto the ring apron that Mike Bennett (left) executed on Whitmer (right) in 2013 resulted in Whitmer suffering a legitimate neck injury

On February 17, 2012, Whitmer returned to ROH after a four-year absence, where he lost to ROH World Television Champion Jay Lethal in a non-title Proving Ground match. After this, Whitmer allied himself with Rhett Titus to feud with Wrestling's Greatest Tag Team. Both teams competed against each other at Glory By Honor XI and a street fight at Final Battle 2012: Doomsday, where Whitmer and Titus lost both matches, the second of which saw Haas throw Whitmer into a table. As a result, Haas and Whitmer faced each other at the 11th Anniversary Show in a No Holds Barred match, which Whitmer won by referee decision. On May 18, 2013, Whitmer unsuccessfully challenged Jay Briscoe for the World Championship. On June 22 at Best in the World 2013, Whitmer defeated Mike Bennett and both subsequently began feuding with each other. On July 12 at Reclamation, Whitmer and the newly renamed Michael Bennett faced off in a rematch, where Bennett defeated Whitmer. August 3 at All Star Extravaganza, Whitmer entered a tournament for the newly vacant World Championship, where he faced Bennett in a first round match. However, the match ended without a winner after Whitmer was legitimately injured after being piledriven on the ring apron. On September 20 at Death Before Dishonor XI, Whitmer announced his retirement due to the neck injury he suffered from Bennett's piledriver.

On December 14 at Final Battle 2013, Whitmer came out of retirement and teamed with Eddie Edwards in a winning effort against Jay Lethal and Roderick Strong. After the match, Whitmer turned heel by attacking Edwards with the assistance of Strong and former tag team partner Jimmy Jacobs. Whitmer then reunited with Jacobs and they both allied with Strong to form The Decade, with the stable's name being a reference to all three men's long tenures with the company. On the January 4, 2014, The Decade secured its first victory as Whitmer and Jacobs defeated Adam Page and Mark Briscoe in a tag team match. Whitmer successfully recruited Colby Corino, the 18-year-old son of Whitmer rival Steve Corino to join the Decade. This caused friction between Jacobs and Whitmer, feeling that taking Corino's son was too much, On March 27, 2015, at Supercard of Honor IX Whitmer defeated Jimmy Jacobs.

Whitmer feuded with Adam Page after Page left The Decade. Whitmer faced Page at ROH 14th Anniversary Show, and defeated him. At Best in the World '16 Whitmer defeated Steve Corino in a Fight Without Honor with the help from Kevin Sullivan. Later Whitmer and Sullivan would align with Punisher Martinez. On January 7, 2017, Whitmer was defeated by Jay Briscoe in the Decade of Excellence. On February 11, Whitmer and Punishment Martinez defeated War Machine, after the match Martinez turned on Whitmer, hitting him with South of Heaven. Whitmer retired as a professional wrestler in 2017.

After retiring, Whitmer worked as backstage producer and sometimes, on commentary. On May 19, 2018, he became one of the trainers at the Baltimore Dojo. However, Whitmer left the promotion on December 20, 2018. He mentioned that the departure was down to ROH not letting him work at WWE's Performance Center as a guest trainer.

In 2022, Whitmer was a judge at Supercard of Honor XV for a ROH Pure Championship match. On December 10, 2022, he returned as a judge during the ROH Pure Championship match at Final Battle.

=== All Elite Wrestling (2019–2023) ===
In 2019, Whitmer signed a contract with the newly formed All Elite Wrestling (AEW) to serve as a coach. In June 2023, Whitmer was fired from AEW following a domestic violence arrest.

== Personal life ==
On June 12, 2023, Whitmer was arrested in Boone County, Kentucky on felony domestic violence and burglary charges after breaking into his ex-girlfriend's home, strangling her, and threatening to kill her. He was released from jail approximately one week later on a $25,000 cash bond, and was subsequently fired from his coaching job with All Elite Wrestling. On September 8, 2023, Whitmer was formally arraigned on felony charges for domestic battery by strangulation and burglary, and entered a not guilty plea. In March 2024, Whitmer accepted an Alford plea and was sentenced to serve 120 days of house arrest, in addition to five years of probation.

== Championships and accomplishments ==
- Absolute Intense Wrestling
  - AIW Intense Championship (1 time)
  - AIW Tag Team Championship (1 time) – with Jimmy Jacobs
- Heartland Wrestling Association
  - HWA Cruiserweight Championship (1 time)
  - HWA Heavyweight Championship (2 times)
- Independent Wrestling Association East Coast
  - IWA East Coast Heavyweight Championship (1 time)
- Independent Wrestling Association Mid-South
  - IWA Mid-South Heavyweight Championship (2 times)
  - IWA Mid-South Light Heavyweight Championship (1 time)
  - Revolution Strong Style Tournament (2003)
  - Ted Petty Invitational (2002)
- Mad Pro Wrestling
  - MPW Heavyweight Championship (1 time)
- New Breed Wrestling Association
  - NBWA Heavyweight Championship (1 time)
- Pro Wrestling Illustrated
  - Ranked No. 118 of the top 500 wrestlers in the PWI 500 in 2007
- Ring of Honor
  - ROH Tag Team Championship (4 times) – with Dan Maff (2) and Jimmy Jacobs (2)
- Stricktly Nsane Pro Wrestling
  - SNPW Heavyweight Championship (1 time)
