= Matt Stryker =

American professional wrestler (born 1975)

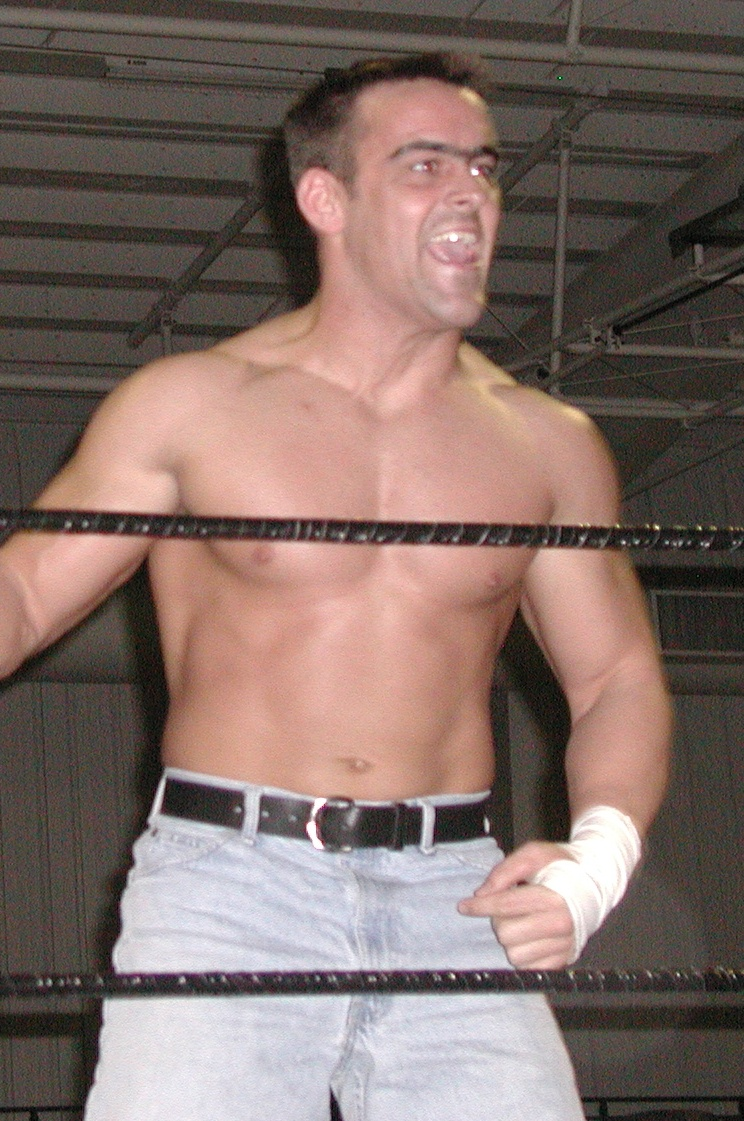

Personal information
- Born: Bryon Woermann; September 16, 1975 (age 50) Cincinnati, Ohio, U.S.

Professional wrestling career
- Ring name: Matt Stryker
- Billed height: 5 ft 11 in (1.80 m)
- Billed weight: 217 lb (98 kg)
- Trained by: Les Thatcher
- Debut: November 7, 1998
- Retired: October 14, 2005

Bryon Woermann (born September 16, 1975) is an American former professional wrestler, better known by his ring name, Matt Stryker.

== Professional wrestling career ==
Bryon Woermann attended Milford High School, where he played basketball and Diving. After graduating, Woermann obtained a job selling cars while trying to pursue a career in Law Enforcement through one of his brothers with the Village of Terrace Park Police Dept. After various run-ins with the law and some convictions, Brian's Law Enforcement career was abruptly cut short.

In 1998, Woermann began focusing on wrestling and started training under Les Thatcher, proprietor of the Main Event Pro Wrestling Camp in Evendale, Ohio, much to the chagrin of his mother. He trained under Thatcher for five months, suffering a knee injury in the course of his training. On November 7, 1998, Woermann wrestled his first match, facing "Bad Boy" Bobby Kane. He then chose the ring name Matt Stryker and began working for Thatcher's Heartland Wrestling Association.

=== Heartland Wrestling Association (1998–2005) ===
Stryker defeated Pepper Parks for his first title, the vacant HWA Cruiserweight Championship, on March 16, 2001. He lost the title to Parks on June 26, but regained the title on August 9 at the 2001 Brian Pillman Memorial Show. Stryker's second reign lasted until September 2, 2001, when he lost to Jamie Knoble.

In May 2002, Stryker's tag team partner, Dean Baldwin, reportedly burnt his eye with a cigar. Stryker immediately sought revenge, which led to Baldwin suing him for $55 million and imposing a restraining order on him for assault, stalking and defamation of character. After feuding with Baldwin throughout June 2002, Stryker set his sights on the HWA Heavyweight Championship.

Stryker defeated Cody Hawk for the HWA Heavyweight Championship on July 17, 2002, in Cincinnati, Ohio. He held the title until November 9, when he lost to Chet Jablonski in Batavia, Ohio. Stryker dominated the HWA Heavyweight Championship division from that point, winning the title twice more in 2003. He took the title a fourth time in 2005, defeating Shawn Osborne on March 25.

Cody Hawk and Stryker reconciled in 2004 and formed a tag team known as the "HWA Icons". The Icons defeated TJ Dalton and JT Stahr for the HWA Tag Team Championships on April 2, 2004, dropping the titles to Benjamin Kimera and Shawn Osbourne on June 15. They took the titles a second time that year, defeated Foreign Intelligence on October 26. Hawk and Stryker were stripped of the titles later that year.

=== Ring of Honor (2003–2005) ===
Stryker debuted in Ring of Honor on January 11, 2003, at Revenge on The Prophecy, losing to fellow HWA wrestler Chad Collyer. Throughout 2003, Stryker wrestled Collyer on a number of occasions. In November 2003, Stryker and seven other wrestlers entered the inaugural "Field of Honor" tournament. After going undefeated and winning Block A, Stryker defeated B. J. Whitmer in the tournament final on December 27, 2003, at Final Battle 2003.

At the Second Anniversary Show on February 14, 2004, Stryker unsuccessfully entered a tournament for the newly created ROH Pure Wrestling Championship. After becoming the number one contender to the ROH World Championship, Stryker lost to the defending champion, Samoa Joe, at Reborn: Stage Two on April 24, 2004. Following the vacation of the ROH Pure Championship by A.J. Styles, Stryker once again attempted to win the title, but was thwarted by Alex Shelley. At Death before Dishonor 2: Part One on July 23, 2004, "Team Steamboat" (Stryker, John Walters and Jimmy Jacobs) defeated Shelley's faction, Generation Next, in a six-man tag team bout.

At Glory by Honor 3 on September 11, 2004, Stryker faced Jay Lethal in a match with the stipulation that, should he lose, he would no longer be flown in to wrestle at East Coast Ring of Honor events (a similar stipulation applied to Lethal). The bout was won by Lethal, with Stryker subsequently delivering an interview in which he announced his intent to return to the Midwest. Stryker subsequently appeared only sporadically with Ring of Honor, losing to Ricky Reyes in his final match on October 14, 2005, at Enter The Dragon.

== Championships and accomplishments ==
- Cleveland All-Pro Wrestling
  - CAPW Junior Heavyweight Championship (1 time)
- Heartland Wrestling Association
  - HWA Cruiserweight Championship (2 times)
  - HWA Heavyweight Championship (4 times)
  - HWA Tag Team Championship (5 times) – with Rory Fox (1), D'Lo Brown (1), Cody Hawk (2) and Tack (1)
- Mad-Pro Wrestling
  - MPW Heavyweight Championship (1 time)
- Premiere Wrestling Federation
  - PWF Tag Team Championship (1 time) – with Josh Daniels
- Ring of Honor
  - Field of Honor (2003)
  - ROH Number One Contender's Trophy

== See also ==
- List of Jewish professional wrestlers
