= HWA Heavyweight Championship =

Professional wrestling championship

Details
- Promotion: Heartland Wrestling Association
- Date established: January 5, 1996
- Date retired: 2015
Statistics
- First champion(s): D'Lo Brown
- Final champion(s): Dustin Rayz
- Most reigns: Race Steele (5 reigns)
- Longest reign: Brian Jennings (381 days)
- Shortest reign: Johnny The Bull (1 hour)

The HWA Heavyweight Championship was the heavyweight title contested in the Heartland Wrestling Association.

== Title history ==
Key
No.	Overall reign number
Reign	Reign number for the specific champion
N/A	The information is not available or is unknown

No.	Champion	Championship change			Reign statistics		Notes	Ref.
No.	Champion	Date	Event	Location	Reign	Days	Notes	Ref.
1	D'Lo Brown	January 5, 1996	HWA	Fort Wright, KY	1	64	Defeated Bobby Blaze in the tournament final to become inaugural champion.	
2	Bobby Blaze	March 9, 1996	HWA	Ashland, KY	1	7		
3	D'Lo Brown	March 16, 1996	HWA	Lima, OH	2	77-106		
Title became inactive from June 1996 to May 2000
4	Race Steele	May 25, 2000	3rd Annual Brian Pillman Memorial Show	Cincinnati, OH	1	246	Steele defeated Chip Fairway in the tournament final to win vacant title.	
5	Chad Collyer	January 26, 2001	HWA	Rising Sun, IN	1	32		
Chad Collyer stripped of title on February 27, 2001.
6	Shark Boy	February 27, 2001	HWA	Cincinnati, OH	1	17	This was a Battle Royal match for the vacant title.	
7	Race Steele	March 16, 2001	HWA	Rising Sun, IN	2	113		
8	Cody Hawk	July 7, 2001	HWA	Cincinnati, OH	1	28		
9	Race Steele	August 4, 2001	HWA	Batavia, OH	3	5		
10	Nick Dinsmore	August 9, 2001	4th Annual Brian Pillman Memorial Show	Cincinnati, OH	1	9		
11	Race Steele	August 18, 2001	HWA	Dayton, OH	4	88		
Championship was held up on September 30, 2001
12.	E. Z. Money	November 14, 2001		Dayton, OH	1	56	Defeated D'Lo Brown in tournament final.	
13.	Charlie Haas	January 9, 2002		Dayton, OH	1	20	Defeated Val Venis in tournament final; Stripped of title January 29, 2002.	
14.	E. Z. Money	January 29, 2002		Dayton, OH	2	45	Was awarded title after Charlie Haas was stripped.	
15.	Rico Constantino	March 15, 2002		Dayton, OH	1	2		
16.	Stevie Richards	March 17, 2002		Jeffersonville, IN	1	3		
17.	Race Steele	March 20, 2002		Cincinnati, OH	5	49		
18.	Johnny the Bull	May 8, 2002		Dayton, OH	1	11		
19.	Lance Cade	May 19, 2002		Jeffersonville, IN	1	62		
20.	Johnny the Bull	July 20, 2002		Batavia, OH	2	<1		
21.	Lance Cade	July 20, 2002		Batavia, OH	2	1		
22.	Cody Hawk	July 21, 2002		Jeffersonville, IN	2	58		
23.	Matt Stryker	September 17, 2002		Cincinnati, OH	1	53		
24.	Chet Jablonski	November 9, 2002		Batavia, OH	1	55		
25.	Matt Stryker	January 3, 2003		Batavia OH	2	80		
26.	Cody Hawk	March 24, 2003		Wilmington, OH	3	5		
27.	Matt Stryker	March 29, 2003		Wilmington, OH	3	17		
28.	Ala Hussein	April 15, 2003		Cincinnati, OH	1	17		
29.	Chad Collyer	May 2, 2003		Aurora, IN	2	127	Won the title by winning a Royal Rumble type match.	
30.	Nigel McGuinness	September 6, 2003		Batavia, OH	1	119		
31.	Hoss	January 3, 2004		Batavia, OH	1	3		
32.	Nigel McGuinness	January 6, 2004		Cincinnati, OH	2	71		
33.	El Temor	March 17, 2004		Cincinnati, OH	1	13		
34.	Rory Fox	March 30, 2004		Cincinnati, OH	1	360		
35	Shawn Osborne	March 25, 2005		Dayton, OH	1	84		
36.	Matt Stryker	June 17, 2005		Cincinnati, OH	4	98		
37.	Cody Hawk	September 23, 2005		Cincinnati, OH	4	39-68	Cody Hawk was stripped of championship after testing positive for steroids in November 2005.	
38.	Pepper Parks	January 1, 2006		Cincinnati, OH	1	128	Defeated Jon Moxley in tournament final for vacant championship.	
39.	Jon Moxley	May 9, 2006		Cincinnati, OH	1	126		
40.	Chad Collyer	September 12, 2006		Cincinnati, OH	3	56		
41.	Pepper Parks	November 7, 2006		Cincinnati, OH	2	28	Pepper Parks vacated the HWA Heavyweight Championship on December 5, 2006 after being "Called Up".	
42.	Jon Moxley	December 30, 2006		Dayton, OH	2	3	Defeated JT Stahr, "Buffalo Bad Boy" Brian Jennings, and Matt Stryker in a fatal 4 way for the vacant title.	
43.	Brian Jennings	January 2, 2007		Cincinnati, OH	1	381		
44	B. J. Whitmer	January 18, 2008		Dayton, OH	1	145	Stripped of the title on June 11, 2008.	
45.	Jake Crist	July 11, 2008		Cincinnati, OH	1	407	Defeated Jon Moxley in playoff match.	
46.	Richard Phillips	August 22, 2009		Norwood, OH	1	119		
47.	Aaron Williams	December 19, 2009		Norwood, OH	1	18		
48.	Jon Moxley	January 6, 2010		Middletown, OH	3	189	Jon Moxley cashed in his Pick Your Poison title shot.	
49.	Gerome Phillips	July 14, 2010		Middletown, OH	2	248		
50.	B. J. Whitmer	March 19, 2011		Norwood, OH	2	161		
51.	Jesse Emerson	August 27, 2011		Norwood, OH	1	112		
52.	Jake Crist	December 17, 2011		Hamilton, OH	2	307	Jake Crist cashed in his Pick Your Poison title shot.	
53.	Ron Mathis	October 19, 2012		Hamilton, OH	1	281	Ron Mathis cashed in his Pick Your Poison title shot, after Crist had already defended the title against Jesse Emerson.	
54.	Chance Prophet	July 27, 2013		Hamilton, OH	1	343	Chance Prophet won the championship against Ron Mathis at the Tournament of B.E.S.T. after Prophet was made the booker of HWA.	
55.	Dustin Rayz	July 5, 2014		Middletown, OH	1	—	Dustin Rayz won the championship against Chance Prophet at Cyber Clash 7.0: Egos Rising. This was after the writing/booking duties were removed from Prophet.	
Retired in 2015

== See also ==
- Heartland Wrestling Association
