= Heartland Wrestling Association =

American professional wrestling promotion

- Acronym: HWA
- Founded: 1996; 30 years ago
- Defunct: 2015; 11 years ago
- Style: American wrestling
- Headquarters: Cincinnati, Ohio, United States (1998–2015)
- Founder: Les Thatcher
- Website: HWAonline.com (inactive)

The Heartland Wrestling Association (HWA) was a Midwestern independent professional wrestling promotion based in Cincinnati, Ohio. A former developmental territory for World Championship Wrestling and the World Wrestling Federation during the 1990s and 2000s, it was listed as one of the top independent promotions in the United States by The Professional Wrestlers' Workout & Instructional Guide by Harley Race, Ricky Steamboat, and Les Thatcher in 2005.

== History ==
The Heartland Wrestling Association was started in 1996 by Les Thatcher and Brady Laber, in association with his wrestling school Main Event Pro Wrestling Camp, and held the first annual Brian Pillman Memorial Show in 1998.

The promotion served as the developmental territory for both World Championship Wrestling (WCW) (during the 1990s) and World Wrestling Entertainment (WWE) (from 2001–2002), with alumni including wrestlers such as Mike Sanders, Shannon Moore, Victoria, The Hardy Boyz and brothers Charlie and Russ Haas, as well as former WCW veterans Bill DeMott and Elix Skipper. Among the top independent wrestlers to have competed in the promotion are Nigel McGuinness, B. J. Whitmer, Matt Stryker, Shark Boy, Cody Hawk and Chad Collyer. WWE would later end its developmental relationship and pulled financial support out of the HWA to cut their budget. The HWA was once featured in an episode of MTV's True Life in the episode "True Life: I'm a Pro Wrestler".

HWA aired a weekly TV program "Adrenaline" nationally on the Cincinnati affiliate of The CW and America One television networks. As of early 2007, HWA had produced three online pay-per-view events: "CyberClash" from the HWA Arena in Evendale, Ohio, on March 17, 2006, "Road to Destiny" from the Dayton Gym Club in Dayton, Ohio on June 10, 2006, and "CyberClash 2.0" from the HWA Arena in Evendale, Ohio on March 10, 2007.

In August 2007, majority owner Cody Hawk left HWA, launching a new promotion called EGO Pro Wrestling. However, HWA continued running events. HWA produced new episodes of HWA Adrenaline through 2008.

Starting in September 2008, HWA performed at The Sorg Opera House in Middletown, Ohio. After a brief hiatus from weekly shows HWA returned starting on May 31, 2011 at the Great Miami Event Center in Hamilton, Ohio on a weekly basis known as "Adrenaline" which was every Tuesday. In addition to these events HWA ran weekend events regularly in Norwood, Ohio and in Hamilton, Ohio respectively.

In Autumn 2014, then HWA owner Brandon Charles announced operations were moving to Georgia in 2015. In June 2015, Heartland Wrestling Association was sold to wrestler and promoter Philip Stamper.

== Championships ==
Heartland Wrestling Association championships
| Championship | Final Champion(s) | Previous | Date Won | Location |
|---|---|---|---|---|
| HWA Heavyweight Championship | Dustin Rayz | Chance Prophet | July 5, 2014 | Middletown, OH |
| HWA Tag Team Championship | Inactive | - | - | - |
| HWA Television Championship | Ganger | Quinten Lee | June 5, 2007 | Cincinnati, OH |
| HWA European Championship | Nigel McGuiness | Hoss | November 4, 2003 | Cincinnati, OH |
| HWA Barroom Brawl Championship | JT Stahr | Vacant | April 21, 2006 | Cincinnati, OH |

== See also ==
- List of independent wrestling promotions in the United States
