= Brian Pillman Memorial Show =

Professional wrestling show

The Brian Pillman Memorial Show was an annual professional wrestling event held between 1998 and 2001 benefiting the children of Brian Pillman and was promoted by the Heartland Wrestling Association (HWA). The events featured talent from World Championship Wrestling (WCW), the World Wrestling Federation (WWF, later WWE) and Extreme Championship Wrestling (ECW), as well as local and independent circuit performers. The proceeds for the event went to the future education of Pillman's children.

== Show results ==
=== 1st Annual Brian Pillman Memorial Show ===
April 29, 1998 in Norwood, Ohio (Norwood Middle School)

No.	Results	Stipulations
1	Nick Dinsmore defeated Trailer Park Trash	Singles match
2	Steve Dunn and Reno Riggins defeated Brian Taylor and The Bounty Hunter	Tag team match
3	Flash Flanagan defeated Bull Pain	Singles match
4	Chip Fairway and Shark Boy defeated Tarek the Great and Sean Casey	Tag team match
5	Al Snow defeated Chris Candido	Singles match
6	Chris Benoit defeated Chris Jericho	Singles match

=== 2nd Annual Brian Pillman Memorial Show ===
May 19, 1999 in Cincinnati, Ohio (Cincinnati Gardens)

No.	Results	Stipulations
1	Shark Boy defeated Matt Stryker	Singles match
2	Tarek the Great defeated Jeremy Jett	Singles match
3	Chip Fairway defeated Chad Collyer by submission.	Singles match
4	Tim Horner and Rob Conway defeated Flash Flanagan and Bull Pain	Tag team match
5	Shark Boy defeated Tarek the Great	Singles match
6	Terry Taylor defeated Tom Prichard	Singles match
7	Shark Boy defeated Chip Fairway	Singles match
8	Al Snow defeated Road Dogg	Singles match
9	Mankind defeated D'Lo Brown	Singles match
10	Konnan and Rey Misterio Jr. defeated Chris Benoit and Dean Malenko	Tag team match

=== 3rd Annual Brian Pillman Memorial Show: Pillman 2000 ===
May 25, 2000 in Cincinnati, Ohio (Xavier University's Schmidt Field House)

No.	Results	Stipulations
1	Rory Fox and Logan Caine defeated Jeremy Lopez and Jet Jaguar	Tag team match
2	B.J. Payne defeated Rico Constantino	Singles match
3	Chuck Palumbo defeated Sean O'Haire	Singles match
4	Scotty Sabre defeated Reckless Youth	Singles match
5	Cody Hawk and Anthony McMurphy (c) defeated Flash Flanagan and Matt Stryker	Tag team match for the HWA Tag Team Championship
6	Shark Boy (c) defeated Jamie-San	Singles match for the HWA Cruiserweight Championship
7	Race Steele defeated Chip Fairway (c)	Singles match for the HWA Heavyweight Championship
8	Anthony McMurphy defeated Cody Michaels	Singles match
9	Tim Horner defeated Dr. Tom Prichard	Singles match
10	The Harris Brothers (Don Harris and Ron Harris) defeated Billy Kidman and Disco Inferno	Tag team match
11	Vampiro defeated Gen. Rection	Singles match
12	Chris Benoit (c) defeated Steven Regal	Singles match for the WWF Intercontinental Championship
13	Diamond Dallas Page defeated Shane Douglas	Singles match
14	Justin Credible (c) defeated Raven	Singles match for the ECW World Heavyweight Championship
15	D'Lo Brown and Eddie Guerrero defeated Perry Saturn and Dean Malenko	Tag team match
(c) / – the champion(s) heading into the match

=== 4th Annual Brian Pillman Memorial Show ===
August 9, 2001 in Cincinnati, Ohio (Oak Hills High School)

No.	Results	Stipulations
1	Nigel McGuinness (HWA) defeated The Machine (OVW)	Interpromotional match
2	Rob Conway and Ron Waterman defeated The Disciples of Synn (Payne and Damien)	Tag team match
3	J.R. Ryder (ECWA) defeated Richard Pound (Stampede Wrestling)	Interpromotional match
4	Chad Collyer (HWA) defeated Donovan Morgan (APW)	Interpromotional match
5	Cody Hawk and Lance Cade defeated The Island Boyz (Ekmo and Kimo)	Tag team match
6	Randy Orton defeated The Prototype	Singles match
7	The Damaja and Mike Hard (OVW) defeated The A Squad (Chet Jablonski and Dean Jablonski) (HWA)	Interpromotional match
8	The Haas Brothers (Charlie Haas and Russ Haas) (HWA) defeated Steve Bradley (HWA) and Rico Constantino (OVW)	Interpromotional match
9	Matt Stryker defeated Chad Collyer, Shark Boy and Pepper Parks (c)	Four-way match for the HWA Cruiserweight Championship
10	Nick Dinsmore defeated Race Steele (c)	Singles match for the HWA Heavyweight Championship
11	Terry Taylor defeated Bobby Eaton	Singles match with Ricky Steamboat as the special guest referee
12	Steve Corino (c) defeated David Flair	Singles match for the NWA World Heavyweight Championship
13	Mark Henry defeated Hugh Morrus	Singles match
14	Lita defeated Victoria	Singles match
15	Evan Karagias defeated Chris Candido	Singles match
16	Perry Saturn and Dean Malenko (WWF) defeated Raven and Justin Credible (ECW)	Interpromotional match
17	The Hardy Boyz (Matt Hardy and Jeff Hardy) (WWF) defeated Edge and Christian (WWF) and Diamond Dallas Page and Kanyon (WCW)	Three-way match
(c) / – the champion(s) heading into the match
