= Chip Fairway =

American professional wrestler (1972–2011)

Personal information
- Born: Brett J. Keen; November 2, 1972 Union, Kentucky, U.S.
- Died: April 9, 2011 (aged 38) Union, Kentucky
- Spouse: Cheryl Keen (m. 2003–2011)
- Children: 3

Professional wrestling career
- Ring name(s): Chip Fairway; Adam Keene; Brett Keen
- Billed height: 5 ft 10 in (1.78 m)
- Billed weight: 225 lb (102 kg)
- Billed from: The 19th Hole; Parts Unknown
- Trained by: Les Thatcher
- Debut: December 15, 1996
- Retired: 2003

Brett J. Keen (November 2, 1972 – April 9, 2011), better known by the ring name Chip Fairway, was an American professional wrestler. One of the top cruiserweight wrestlers in the Midwestern United States during the mid-to-late 1990s, his in-ring persona as a pro golfer turned wrestler was considered one of the most unusual "gimmicks" on the independent circuit.

Trained by wrestler Les Thatcher, Keen made his wrestling debut in December 1996. He worked for the Heartland Wrestling Association twice winning the HWA Tag Team Championship with Cody Hawk as part of The Surf 'N' Turf Connection. Keen was a close friend of Brian Pillman and regularly performed at the Brian Pillman Memorial Shows. He was an occasional preliminary wrestler for World Championship Wrestling and the World Wrestling Federation.

Keen was also a major star in IWA Mid-South where he won the IWA Mid-South Heavyweight Championship two times and the IWA Mid-South Television Championship three times. His long-running rivalry with IWA Mid-South Heavyweight Champion Bull Pain was a prominent storyline in the promotion's history as well as one of the biggest feuds on the Midwestern independent circuit. From 1998 to 2001, Keen was part of The Old School Posse with GQ Masters III, Sean Casey, Shark Boy, and manager Dutch Mantell which antagonized the promotion's hardcore wrestlers for several years.

== Professional wrestling career ==
=== Heartland Wrestling Association (1996–97) ===
Keen was trained at Les Thatcher's "Main Event Pro Wrestling Camp" in Cincinnati, Ohio. Keen was initially brought to the wrestling school by a friend. Keen continued training there after his friend dropped out and made his pro debut in Indianapolis, Indiana on December 15, 1996. He eventually became a mainstay for the Heartland Wrestling Association based in Cincinnati. Wrestling under his real name, Keen battled Brian Taylor and The Xtremist during his first year in Thatcher's promotion. On October 25, 1997, Keen won a 12-man battle royal at an HWA house show in Harveysburg, Ohio. As a developmental territory for both World Championship Wrestling and the World Wrestling Federation, this allowed Fairway to make appearances for both promotions as a preliminary wrestler.

=== IWA Mid-South (1997–98) ===
In addition to the HWA, Keen also wrestled for IWA Mid-South in neighboring Louisville, Kentucky. In November 1997, he began wrestling under the name "Chip Fairway", an ex-golfer turned pro wrestler, and remained undefeated during his first five months in the promotion. As part of his gimmick, Keen carried a golf club called "Big Bertha" which referred to as "his personal valet". Fairway defeated Shark Boy at Gorefeast 1997. On December 9, 1997, Keen defeated Cash Flo in Louisville, Kentucky for the IWA Mid-South Television Championship. and successfully defended the belt against Steven Dunn, Shark Boy, and Flash Flanagan during the next few weeks. He lost the belt back to Flo on January 29, 1998, but regained it the following night in Lexington, Kentucky.

A week later, Keen was defeated for the title by IWA Mid-South Heavyweight Champion Bull Pain in a Champion vs. Champion match at No Blood, No Guts, No Glory 1998 in New Albany, Indiana. Fairplay failed to regain the title from Pain at IWA Mid-South's Eddie Gilbert Memorial Show but won it back in Louisville on March 12. His third and final title reign ended when he was defeated by Shark Boy on April 2, 1998. The championship was retired after the match due to the cancellation of the promotion's television show. Despite this, Fairway and Shark Boy's feud continued throughout the spring. On April 29, Fairway and Shark Boy defeated Terek the Great and "Live Wire" Sean Casey at the 1st Annual Brian Pillman Memorial Show. The following night at April Bloodshowers 1998, Fairway and Shark Boy wrestled to a time limit draw in a Mask vs. Dress match. Shark Boy defeated Chip Fairway in a rematch several weeks later. On June 27, Fairway beat Mike Sensation to earn a title shot at IWA Mid-South Light Heavyweight Champion Cash Flo but failed to win the title later that night. He briefly feuded with Shawn Casey that same month. On July 23, Fairway lost to Casey in a Best 2-of-3 Falls match. Fairway joined forces with Shark Boy to defeat Casey and G.Q. Masters III at Extreme Heaven 1998 a week later. For the next few months, Fairway was a regular at IWA Mid-South's Total Eclipse Teen Club shows where he faced such opponents as American Kickboxer, Corporal Robinson, Doug Gilbert, Mad Man Pondo, Ox Harley and IWA Mid-South Heavyweight Champion Harry Palmer.

In the fall of 1998, Fairway joined G.Q. Masters III, Sean Casey, Shark Boy, and manager Dutch Mantell to form The Old School Posse. As all four wrestlers were HWA alumni, trained in traditional style of pro wrestling, they were often at odds with the promotion's hardcore wrestlers. On November 12, Fairway and Shark Boy defeated The Suicide Kid and "Nature Boy" Buddy Landell at IWA Mid-South's 2nd Anniversary Show in Louisville, Kentucky. Fairway also beat The Suicide Kid in a singles match the following night in West Point, Kentucky. He returned to West Point at the end of the month for IWA Bloodfeast where he wrestled Wolfie D at Bloodfeast 98. At the end of 1998, in his second year as a wrestler, Fairway was ranked #500 in the PWI 500.

=== Heartland Wrestling Association (1998–99) ===
Back in the HWA, Keen feuded with Anthony Kingdom James during the first half of 1998. On August 15, Fairway and James wrestled to a 2–2 draw in a 30-minute Iron Man match. After the feud ended, Fairway began teaming with Cody Hawk as The Surf 'N' Turf Connection. On September 23, the team defeated "The Expert" Brian Taylor and The Bounty Hunter in Lima, Ohio for the HWA Tag Team Championship. A match against Taylor and Sean Casey in Blanchester, Ohio on November 7, 1998, ended in a no-contest. A week later in Aberdeen, Ohio, Fairway and Hawk beat Taylor and G.Q. Masters III in a tag team elimination match. On December 5, 1998, Fairway beat Sean Casey via forfeit in Blanchester. As a result, Fairway got 5 minutes in the ring with G.Q. Masters III but lost the bout.

They lost the championship to Taylor and Casey in Hamilton, Ohio on January 23, 1999, but regained them on February 27. The Surf 'N' Turf Connection held on to the belts for six months before dropping them to Alexis Machine and "Beautiful" Brian Fury in Blanchester on August 25, 1999. Earlier that month, the team appeared with Andrew McMurphy on WWF Shotgun Saturday Night in a six-man tag team match against Droz, Key and Prince Albert at the Joe Louis Arena.

Also that summer, Fairway was among the cruiserweight wrestlers invited to take part in a special championship tournament held at the Cincinnati Gardens for the 2nd Annual Pillman Memorial Show. He was one of six cruiserweights representing the HWA at the event. Fairway defeated Chad Collyer via submission in the opening round but lost to Shark Boy in the finals. Shark Boy's performance in the tournament, and his bout with Fairway in particular, was covered by several wrestling magazines and led to Shark Boy being signed to World Championship Wrestling. The young wrestler later called this bout the most favorite match of his career.

=== IWA Mid-South (1999) ===
On January 3, 1999, Fairway wrestled Mitch Page and Twiggy Rameriz in a 3-Way Dance at Barbwire, Bulbs, and Blood in Charlestown, Indiana. On January 21, Fairway defeated The Suicide Kid for the IWA Mid-South Heavyweight Championship. The Suicide Kid won the title back a week later at Kentucky Armageddon. The title was declared vacant after a February 2 title defense when both men scored a double pin. A ladder match was held at Last Chance In Charlestown the following night, which Fairway won. Fairway's second title reign lasted almost three months retaining the title against Rollin' Hard, 2 Tuff Tony, and Ian Rotten. On April 2, Fairway and Dean Baldwin were defeated in a tag team match against Rotten and Corporal Robinson. On April 29, Rotten won the title from Dean Baldwin, substituting for Fairway, in Salem, Indiana.

=== Heartland Wrestling Association (1999–2000) ===
On November 6, 1999, Fairway beat Alexis Machine (with G.Q. Masters III) in a Texas Death match. A month later, The Surf 'N' Turf Connection lost to Alexis Machine and Brian Fury in a match for the HWA Tag Team Championship. On January 23, 2000, Fairway faced the tag team champions with Race Steele at Eastern High School but came up short. On February 5, The Surf 'N' Turf Connection and Steele defeated Bull Pain, G.Q. Masters III, Alexis Machine and Brian Fury when Steele pinned Masters due to outside interference by Shark Boy.

==== Feud with Shark Boy ====
On April 15, Fairway defeated The Xtremist at Shark Boy Comes Home. Later, during the main event between Shark Boy and Jeremy Lopez, Fairway stopped Lopez's cornerman Tony Marinara from interfering in the match. Afterwards, Fairway challenged Shark Boy for the HWA Cruiserweight Championship. The confrontation turned into a "worked shoot" with Shark Boy removing his mask and telling the crowd "This isn't about Shark Boy and Chip; this is about Dean and Brett". When Shark Boy turned his back, Fairway hit him from behind and continued attacking Shark Boy until the entire HWA roster came out to chase him off. The two wrestlers met two weeks later in Greensburg, Pennsylvania where Fairway lost to Shark Boy in a Ladder match. The following night in Hamilton, Ohio, Fairway was disqualified in his match against Race Steele when he assaulted the referee.

That same month, Fairway was entered into a championship tournament via lottery drawing to crown a new HWA Heavyweight Champion. Fairway defeated Anthony MacMurphy in the opening rounds and Cody Hawk in the semi-finals. During the tournament, Fairway bragged that he would win both the heavyweight title and Shark Boy's cruiserweight title. On the night of the semi-finals, he attempted to interfere in Shark Boy's title defense against Matt Stryker and Astin Agustus Ambrose but was prevented by the latter. On May 19, Fairway met Shark Boy at Carlisle High School but was again disqualified for hitting the referee. He and Shark Boy (with Nick Roll) wrestled to a double-disqualification the following night in Lebanon, Ohio when Brian Fury, Bobby Casanova, Anthony MacMurphy and Cody Hawk all ran in. On May 25, Fairway wrestled Race Steele in the tournament final for the vacant title at the 3rd Annual Pillman Memorial Show. D'Lo Brown, the inaugural champion, was the special guest referee. Fairway lost the bout when his manager, local disc jockey Mark Amazon, attempted to hit Steele with a golf club. Brown prevented Amazon from interfering, however, and Fairway crashed into his manager during the confusion. Steele took advantage of his distracted opponent and pinned Fairway with a Diamond Cutter.

On June 17, in Hamilton, Ohio, Fairway defeated Shark Boy in a Lumberjack match. Fairway won the bout with his Sandtrap finisher after "The Hussla" Tim Moxley hit Shark Boy with a steel chair. Fairway refused to release the submission hold until HWA Heavyweight Champion Race Steele came to the ring. Fairway then challenged Steele for a title shot which the newly crowned champion accepted. On June 24, Fairway and Matt Stryker (with Hellena Heavenly) lost to Shark Boy and Astin Augustus Ambrose, Esq. in a Best 2-out-of-3 Falls match in Middletown, Ohio. Fairway won the first fall when Ambrose submitted to The Sandtrap. Ambrose scored the second fall when he pinned Stryker with a sunset flip. The final fall was awarded via disqualification when Ambrose was lured away from the ring by Bennie the Bookie allowing Tim Moxley to attack Shark Boy from behind. Race Steele once again showed up to make the save.

==== Chasing the Heavyweight Champion ====
Fairway turned his sights towards the then reigning HWA Heavyweight Champion Race Steele. He was pinned by Steele at the Gateway Sports Complex in Dayton, Ohio on July 15. Their July 22 match in Hamilton, Ohio ended in controversy when the winning pinfall was counted by two different referees. When Steele reversed The Sandtrap, Fairway countered with a German suplex pinning both men's shoulders on the mat. The two referees disagreed on which wrestler had scored the pinfall and announced a separate winner. HWA Commissioner Patrick Black was forced to declare a no contest and ordered a ladder match to take place when the promotion returned to Hamilton.

As a result of the 6-way brawl in Lebanon two months earlier, HWA Commissioner Patrick Black ordered a six-man tag team elimination match with the added stipulation that Nick Roll and G.Q. Masters III would be handcuffed at ringside. The bout was held when the promotion returned to Lebanon on July 28 which pitted Fairway, Brian Fury and Bobby Casanova against Shark Boy, Cody Hawk and Anthony McMurphy. Shark Boy, the team's sole survivor, pinned Fairway with the help of Race Steele. After the match, Fairway challenged Steele to a Lumberjack Strap match when HWA returned to Lebanon once again. This was immediately approved by Commissioner Black who also told G.Q. Masters III that he was suspended indefinitely from the promotion.

On August 5, 2000, Fairway and Shark Boy fought in a Blanchester Boot Camp match. Shark Boy won the match after hitting Fairway with the Dead Sea Drop. Steele attempted to interfere in the bout by hitting Fairway with a steel chair but was dropkicked in the face instead. However, this allowed Shark Boy an opportunity to climb the top rope and use his finisher. Shark Boy was declared the winner when Fairway was unable to get up by the count of ten. Fairway and Steele brawled to the locker room after the match was over. On August 12, Fairway wrestled Steele in an "I Quit" match in Middletown, Ohio. Their respective cornermen, Tim Moxley and Shark Boy, would throw in the towel when either wrestler surrendered. Steele won the match using Fairway's own Sandtrap finisher.

==== Association with Rory Fox ====
While feuding with the heavyweight champion, Fairway began stalking "Rapid Delivery" Rory Fox. At first Fairway would insult Fox after his matches, however, he assisted Fox in his August 5 bout against B. J. Whitmer by hitting his opponent with a steel chair when the referee was accidentally knocked out. The next week, Whitmer confronted his friend about Fairway's interference prior to their rematch. Fox denied any involvement and suggested Fairway had targeted Whitmer. Fairway, however, was able to turn Fox against his allies. On August 26, Fairway urged Fox to attack Future Shock during their six-man tag team match against The GQ Corporation (Bobby Casanova, Brian Fury and Alexis Machine). Fox knocked out both Whitmer and Caine with a steel chair, allowing Alexis Machine to eliminate both men, before leaving with Fairway. Later during the main event, Fox interfered in the ladder match between Fairway and Steele. Fairway whipped Steele into both the ladder and referee Joe Kopasz giving Fox a chance to climb to the top and retrieve the HWA Heavyweight Championship. Shark Boy quickly hit the ring, however, and knocked Fox before he could grab the title. Steele was holding the title as the referee regained consciousness and awarded the match to the heavyweight champion. Steele and Shark Boy demanded a match with Fairway and Fox after the match. They were interrupted by Future Shock who insisted they deserved the first shot at the wrestlers. HWA Commissioner Patrick Black settled the dispute by ordering a 3-Way Dance between the three teams at a later date. The commissioner also put the HWA Heavyweight and Cruiserweight Championships on the line so that Fairway and Fox would not try to get out of the match.

On September 1, Fairway and Fox wrestled The A Squad (Chet Jablonski and Pepper Parks) at the Grand Victoria Casino. At the two-day Classicfest in Fort Loramie, Ohio, Fairway defeated Logan Caine by submission to win a title shot against Race Steele. Fairway lost to the champion the following night. On September 10, Fairway officially introduced Fox as his new "caddy". Fox had previously been featured on the MTV television documentary True Life: I'm a Professional Wrestler. By this time, Fox had developed a prima donna personality and lashed out at Future Force and the fans for not giving him the respect he deserved as an "MTV superstar". The two attacked Future Shock during their match with The A Squad. Later on, Future Force returned the favor during the Falls Count Anywhere match between Fairway and Steele. As they brawled with Fairway and Fox, Steele seized the opportunity to hit Fairway with his Jumping Steele Cutter for the win.

On September 16, Fairway and Fox faced The A Squad at Gateway Sports Park. Fox cost them the match when he tagged himself in while Fairway had Parks in The Sandtrap. Fairway was forced to leave the ring by the referee and Fox was later pinned. In the main event (a Texas Tornado Falls Count Anywhere match) between Hellena's Hunks (with Hellena Heavenly) and Race Steele and Shark Boy, Fairway and Fox interfered. When referee Joe Kopasz was accidentally clotheslined, the duo grabbed Shark Boy and carried him backstage. Though left to fend for himself, Steele managed to win the match.

On September 23, Fairway (with Rory Fox) wrestled Matt Stryker (with Hellena Heavenly) at Cincinnati's Western Sports Mall. An ill-timed distraction by Fox allowed Stryker to break out of The Sandtrap and pin Fairway with his own finisher. Angry that Fox had cost him the match, Fairway slapped his caddy across the face and demanded that he make up for the loss by winning the 4-Way Dance in the main event. Fox managed to outlast Chad Collyer and Tim Moxley but was unable to win the Cruiserweight title from Shark Boy. Fairway and Fox lost to Future Shock (B. J. Whitmer and Logan Caine) at the Sports Plus Arena on September 30. After Fox was pinned, Fairway blamed him for the loss and ordered him back to the locker room.

On October 7, Fairway helped Fox defeat Shark Boy in a ladder match to win the HWA Cruiserweight Champion. Also on that show, Fairway defeated B. J. Whitmer. At Autumn Bash, beat Logan Caine via submission after Fox distracted his opponent. Two weeks later, Fairway and Chad Collyer (with Hellena Heavenly) lost to Shark Boy and HWA Heavyweight Champion Race Steele. On November 4, 2000, Fairway and Fox lost to Shark Boy and Race Steele in Blanchester. Shark Boy regained the Cruiserweight title when he pinned Fox during the match. A falling out with Fox resulted in Fairway's defeat at the hands of his former caddy on HWA Showcase two months later. Fairway refused to release Fox from The Sandtrap, however, until G.Q. Masters III came out to ringside and bought Fox's contract.

=== IWA Mid-South (2000–01, 2003) ===
On February 4, 2000, Fairway defeated Phoenix at IWA Independence Day: Let The Chairshots Ring. Five days later at the House of Hardcore, he beat Paul E. Smooth via submission. Also during the show, Fairway and Shark Boy interfered in a match between Rollin' Hard and Mike Sensation which caused Rollin' Hard to be pinned. He also joined The Old School Posse in an attack against Mean Mitch Page after his victory over American Kickboxer. Rollin' Hard came out to help Page and chased the group out of the ring. The two men challenged The Old School Posse to a tag team match the following week. On February 23, G.Q. Masters III (substituting for Fairway) defeated Page at the House of Hardcore. Fairway was at ringside during the bout. He later distracted the referee so that Shark Boy could hit Page with a missile dropkick from behind and allow Masters to score a pinfall over his fallen opponent. On July 3, Fairway beat J Prodigy via submission at Blood Showers 2000. A few days later, Fairway wrestled Tracy Smothers to a 20-minute time-limit draw. He also scored submission victories over Chris Hero and B. J. Whitmer over the summer.

On September 8, 2000, Fairway entered IWA Mid South's 2-day Sweet Science Sixteen tournament in Charlestown, Indiana. With Dean Baldwin as special guest referee, he defeated B. J. Whitmer in the opening round but was eliminated by Harry Palmer in the quarterfinals the following night. On November 23, Fairway and Shark Boy defeated B. J. Whitmer and Mark Wolf at Bloodfeast 2000 when Fairway made Wolf submit to his Sandtrap finisher. Fairway similarly beat The Suicide Kid two days later at the House of Hardcore in Charlestown, Indiana. On December 2, 2000, Fairway beat B. J. Whitmer in a Best 2-of-3 Falls match at the House of Hardcore. He lost to Whitmer at New Year's Knockout a month later. Five months later, Fairway was beaten by Jamie Dundee at No Blood, No Guts, No Glory 2001. He won a victory over Steve Corino at Extreme Heaven 2001 on July 7, 2001. The following week, Fairway returned to the House of Hardcore where wrestled Trent Baker and Hido in a 3-Way Dance for the IWA Mid-South Heavyweight Championship. Fairway was involved in a near-fatal car accident around this time but returned to action within two months. After meeting his future wife in 2002, however, Fairway ultimately decided to retire so he could spend more time with his children. On January 24, 2003, Fairway made his final appearance at IWA Mid-South's 300th Show in Clarksville, Indiana where he defeated M-Dogg 20.

== Later years ==
After leaving pro wrestling, Keen returned to his hometown where he eventually opened his own barber shop. He purchased the building from the town barber who had cut his own hair as a child. He also married Cheryl Keen with whom he had three children. Keen was involved in youth sports as a coach for pee-wee football. Keen died in his sleep on April 9, 2011, at age 38.

Several wrestlers were present at his memorial service including Cody Hawk, Sean Casey, Shark Boy, The Suicide Kid, Astin Augustus Ambrose, and HWA senior referee Joe Kopasz. Two months later, wrestling referee John Gray held a special tribute show on the June 14 edition of The Real Side of Wrestling podcast. A former IWA Mid-South official, Gray was joined by several of Keen's former co-workers including Donnie the DJ, The Suicide Kid, G.Q. Masters III, Shark Boy, and Keen's widow Cheryl Keen. Both Hawk and Shark Boy credited Keen for influencing their early careers. Keen's children were among those listening to the podcast as the guests shared their memories of the late wrestler.

== Personal life ==
Brett Keen was born to Rosella and Roderic Keen in Union, Kentucky on November 7, 1972. He was one of seven children.

== Championships and accomplishments ==
- Heartland Wrestling Association
  - HWA Tag Team Championship (2 times) – with Cody Hawk
- Independent Wrestling Association Mid-South
  - IWA Mid-South Heavyweight Championship (2 times)
  - IWA Mid-South Television Championship (3 times)
- Pro Wrestling Illustrated
  - PWI ranked him 500 of the top 500 singles wrestlers in the PWI 500 in 1998
  - PWI ranked him 420 of the top 500 singles wrestlers in the PWI 500 in 1999
  - PWI ranked him 411 of the top 500 singles wrestlers in the PWI 500 in 2000
