= Mike Sanders (wrestler) =

American professional wrestler and stand-up comedian (born 1969)

Personal information
- Born: Michael Edwin Neil Sanders; July 20, 1969 (age 57) Smyrna, Georgia, U.S.
- Children: 2

Professional wrestling career
- Ring name: Mike Sanders
- Billed height: 6 ft 1 in (1.85 m)
- Billed weight: 231 lb (105 kg)
- Billed from: Atlanta, Georgia
- Trained by: WCW Power Plant
- Debut: 1998
- Retired: 2005

Michael Edwin Neil Sanders (born July 20, 1969) is an American stand-up comedian and former professional wrestler. Sanders is best known for his time in World Championship Wrestling, where he was a one time Cruiserweight Champion.

== Early life ==
Sanders was named in honor of the Apollo 11 astronauts Michael Collins, Edwin "Buzz" E. Aldrin Jr. and Neil A. Armstrong as Sanders was born on the day the Apollo 11 Moon landing occurred.

== Professional wrestling career ==
=== World Championship Wrestling (1998–2001) ===
After beginning his training at the Power Plant in June 1998, Sanders made his World Championship Wrestling debut on the October 10, 1998 episode of Saturday Night in a losing effort to Chavo Guerrero Jr. After being utilized as a jobber in a handful of matches on Saturday Night and WorldWide throughout 1998 and 1999, Sanders picked up his first victory on the July 19, 2000 episode of Thunder by defeating Crowbar. Sanders was introduced in mid-2000 as "Above Average" Mike Sanders.

On the August 16 episode of Thunder, Sanders was courted by Disco Inferno to join The Filthy Animals. After accompanying Rey Mysterio Jr. and Juventud Guerrera for their tag team match against Sean O'Haire and Mark Jindrak, Sanders turned on the Animals and, along with Chuck Palumbo, Shawn Stasiak, and Reno, helped O'Haire and Jindrak attack the Animals and lose the match via disqualification in the process. On the August 21 episode of Nitro, the stable was named The Natural Born Thrillers, with Sanders serving as the stable's mouthpiece. After Sanders was interrupted during a promo by Filthy Animal member Konnan, the Thrillers (Sanders, Jindrak, and O'Haire) subsequently defeated the Animals (Mysterio Jr., Guerrera, and Disco Inferno) in a six-man tag team match.

The Thrillers continued their feud with the Animals, with Sanders defeating the Inferno on the August 23 episode of Thunder and the Thrillers defeating the Animals in an elimination match. On September 17 at Fall Brawl, the Thrillers faced the Animals, Big Vito and their mystery partner (later revealed to be Paul Orndorff) in an elimination match, which ended in a no-contest due to Orndorff suffering a stinger during the match. The Thrillers would then go on to lose a two-on-five handicap match against the Animals on the September 18 episode of Nitro despite having a numerical advantage, ending the feud between the two stables.

Following their feud with the Filthy Animals, the Natural Born Thrillers would go on to lose to The Jung Dragons on the September 20 episode of Thunder. After naming himself the new WCW Commissioner on the September 27 episode of Thunder, the Thrillers gained Kevin Nash as a "coach". With Nash, Sanders defeated then-Cruiserweight Champion Elix Skipper in a handicap powerbomb match orchestrated by Sanders on the October 2 episode of Nitro, resulting in Sanders becoming the new Cruiserweight Champion. He then went on to retain the Cruiserweight Title against Lance Storm in his first title defense on the October 4 episode of Thunder. Sanders then entered into a feud with Ernest Miller over the Commissionership, and defeated Miller in a kickboxing match at Halloween Havoc on October 29 to retain his position as Commissioner thanks to interference by Shane Douglas. The Thrillers then ended their alliance with Nash by attacking him during a title match against then-World Heavyweight Champion Booker T, after finding Nash no longer useful due to Sanders being the new Commissioner. The Thrillers then lost to Nash in a handicap match via disqualification on the November 12 episode of Nitro. On November 16 at the Millennium Final pay-per-view, Miller defeated Sanders to become the new WCW Commissioner. After retaining the Cruiserweight Title against Kwee Wee on November 26 at Mayhem, Sanders lost the title to Chavo Guerrero Jr. on the December 6 episode of Thunder.

On the December 12 episode of Nitro, Sanders was squashed by Sid, though the Thrillers would manage to defeat The Insiders (Nash and Diamond Dallas Page) in a handicap match later in the night in what turned out to be the Thrillers' final match together.

At Sin on January 14, 2001, Sanders faced Miller in a rematch for the Commissionership, but was once again defeated. Following this, Sanders teamed with Kwee Wee and lost to the Jung Dragons in a first round match of a tournament to crown the inaugural Cruiserweight Tag Team Champions. On the final episode of Thunder on March 14, Sanders wrestled his final match for WCW as he and Disqo lost to Konnan and Hugh Morrus in a tag team match.

In late March 2001, the World Wrestling Federation bought out WCW.

=== World Wrestling Federation / Entertainment (2001–2002) ===
When WCW was purchased by the World Wrestling Federation, Sanders' contract was acquired as part of the deal and he was then sent to Heartland Wrestling Association (HWA), one of the WWF's developmental territories. While there, he was a member of the Team WCW stable along with fellow WCW alumni Johnny The Bull, Reno, Mark Jindrak, Jason Jett, Lash LeRoux, Shannon Moore, Evan Karagias, Kwee Wee, Elix Skipper, and Jamie Knoble.

Sanders later formed a tag team with Lance Cade called Natural Born Attitudes, and on February 13, 2002, the duo captured the HWA Tag Team Championship belts after defeating Val Venis and Steve Bradley. However, the Tag Team Title was vacated that same day, and Cade defeated Sanders on February 20 to win the title and subsequently named Bradley as his tag team partner.

In March 2002, Sanders became the head booker of HWA after suffering a foot injury. On June 24, 2002, Sanders wrestled his only match for the now-renamed World Wrestling Entertainment as he and Jason Sugarman defeated B.J. Payne and Steve Bradley in a tag team dark match before Sunday Night Heat. He was released from the company on July 19, 2002.

=== TNA and Later Career (2002–2005) ===
After being released from WWE, he did a brief tour with World Wrestling All-Stars in 2002 as the promotion's Commissioner. Sanders debuted in Total Nonstop Action Wrestling on January 15, 2003, where he lost to Jerry Lynn. Sanders then immediately joined Sports Entertainment Xtreme (S.E.X.), the top heel stable in TNA. On January 22, Sanders picked up his first victory in TNA as he and David Flair defeated Lynn and Ron Killings in a tag team match. After mixed success over the next few months, Sanders challenged Kid Kash for the X Division Championship, but was unable to win the title. On May 21, Sanders entered the Hard 10 Tournament and defeated Brian Lee in the first round. On June 18, Sanders lost to New Jack in the semi-finals. Sanders wrestled his final match for TNA on July 2, where he lost to Shark Boy.

After taking a two-year hiatus, Sanders returned to wrestling on February 20, 2005, for Vince Russo's Ring of Glory promotion, where he and Glenn Gilbertti defeated Adam Jacobs and Johnny Swinger. On December 16, Sanders returned to Ring of Glory and wrestled his final match, as he and Erik Watts lost to Gilbertti and D'Lo Brown.

== Comedy career ==
After his final match in 2005, Sanders performed his first open mic at The Punchline, a comedy club in Sandy Springs, Georgia. Since then, Sanders has gone on to become a full-time stand-up comedian and improv actor, and has also worked alongside fellow comedians Tommy Davidson, Mark Lundholm, Diana Jordan, Craig Robinson and Vinnie Coppola. He currently performs at clubs and corporate events and gives motivational speeches.

== Personal life ==
Sanders' father runs a towing business. Sanders owns "Roll Speed Media", a talent solutions company that represents actors in Atlanta; he also owns "The Party Paramedic", a DJ and entertainment company for weddings, parties, corporate events and trade shows.

Sanders has been divorced twice; he and his ex-wife DeLana have two children, Kenneth and Alexis.

Sanders remains good friends with former WCW creative writer Vince Russo and fellow professional wrestlers Chuck Palumbo, Disco Inferno, Mark Jindrak and Sean O'Haire until O'Haire's death.

== Championships and accomplishments ==
- Big Time Wrestling (California)
  - BTW United States Championship (1 time)
- Heartland Wrestling Association
  - HWA Tag Team Championship (1 time) – with Lance Cade
- Pro Wrestling Illustrated
  - PWI ranked him #179 of the top 500 singles wrestlers in the PWI 500 in 2003
- Universal Championship Wrestling
  - UCW American Junior Heavyweight Championship (1 time)
- World Championship Wrestling
  - WCW Cruiserweight Championship (1 time)
