= Eddie Gilbert Memorial Show =

Professional wrestling event

The Eddie Gilbert Memorial Show was an annual professional wrestling memorial event produced by the IWA Mid-South (IWA-MS) promotion from 1997 to 1998. It was held in memory of wrestler "Hot Stuff" Eddie Gilbert who died of a heart attack in Isla Verde, Puerto Rico on February 18, 1995. The shows were held separately from the National Wrestling Alliance-affiliated Eddie Gilbert Memorial Brawl, which ran from 1996 to 1999, and featured wrestlers and other talent who performed with Gilbert during his career. IWA Mid-South was among the promotions accused of financially exploiting Gilbert's death. "Nature Boy" Buddy Landel, who regularly performed for the NWA shows, initially declined Ian Rotten's offer to appear for the IWA Mid-South version for this reason. When Austin Idol failed to appear for the main event at the 1998 edition, Rotten publicly announced that he had filed criminal charges against the wrestler.

Rotten defended holding the shows. Though he did not personally know Gilbert, a number of IWA Mid-South mainstays had worked with the late wrestler. IWA Mid-South Heavyweight Champion Bull Pain, for example, defeated Gilbert and Jeff Jarrett for the USWA Tag Team Championship in 1991. Feeling that Gilbert has been largely forgotten by modern wrestling fans, Rotten was motivated to hold the Ted Petty Invitational and Chris Candido Cup Tag Team Tournament during the 2000s for the same reasons. The shows were endorsed by the Gilbert family with Tommy and Doug Gilbert having prominent roles. A portion of the show's proceeds were donated to a college scholarship fund for high school seniors in Lexington, Tennessee; Eddie Gilbert's mother, Peggy Gilbert, raffled off one of the late wrestler's ring jackets for the fund.

== Eddie Gilbert Memorial Show (1997) ==
The Eddie Gilbert Memorial Show (1997) was a professional wrestling memorial event produced by IWA Mid-South (IWA-MS), which took place on March 13, 1997, at the Derby Sports Arena in Louisville, Kentucky. Ten professional wrestling matches were scheduled on the event's card, one of which involved championships, with two main matches. The first main event match was a Chain match between Doug Gilbert and Terry Funk, which Gilbert won. The second was a match between Dory Funk, Jr. and Tommy Gilbert which ended in a 20-minute time-limit draw. One of the featured matches on the undercard was Vampire Warrior versus Vladimir Koloff, which Vampire Warrior won by pinfall. The other was American Kickboxer versus Tarek the Great for the IWA Mid-South Light Heavyweight Championship, which American Kickboxer won, also by pinfall. The event also marked the last appearance of longtime manager Billy the P at the IWA Mid-South arena and subsequently retired from the business.

=== Results ===
No.	Results	Stipulations	Times
1	Tower of Doom defeated Justin St. John	Singles match	—
2	Kip Morris (with Jerry Wilson) defeated Bull Pain	Singles match	18:16
3	Gator McAllister and Rico Beatty defeated Ace Madison and Tracy Smothers	Tag Team match	8:34
4	Tommy Rich defeated Ricky Morton	Singles match	6:09
5	Mad Man Pondo defeated Harley Lewis and Ian Rotten	Four Corners of Pain Triangle match	14:26
6	Luna Vachon defeated Debbie Combs	Singles match	6:26
7	American Kickboxer defeated Tarek the Great (c)	Singles match for the IWA Mid-South Light Heavyweight Championship	11:13
8	Vampire Warrior (with Luna Vachon) defeated Vladimir Koloff	Singles match	7:49
9	Dory Funk, Jr. vs. Tommy Gilbert ended in a time-limit draw	Singles match	20:00
10	Doug Gilbert defeated Terry Funk	Chain match	9:49
(c) / – the champion(s) heading into the match

== Eddie Gilbert Memorial Show (1998) ==
The Eddie Gilbert Memorial Show (1998) was a professional wrestling memorial event produced by IWA Mid-South (IWA-MS), which took place on February 21, 1998, at the Derby Sports Arena in Louisville, Kentucky. Eight professional wrestling matches were featured on the card, one of which involved championships. The main event was a tag team match pitting the team of Doug Gilbert and Dutch Mantel against the team of "The Beast" Dan Severn and Terry "Bam Bam" Gordy, which Gilbert and Mantel won. Buddy Landel was the special guest referee. The predominant match on the undercard was between Kip Morris and Rip Rogers, which Morris won by disqualification. Another featured match was Bull Pain, who held both the IWA Mid-South Heavyweight and Television Championships, versus Chip Fairway. The show also attracted some controversy when Rotten announced that the promotion had filed criminal charges against Austin Idol who had failed to appear for the main event.

=== Results ===
No.	Results	Stipulations
1	Shark Boy defeated Phoenix	Singles match
2	Flash Flanagan defeated Billy Black	Singles match
3	The Suicide Kid defeated American Kickboxer and Tarek the Great	Triangle match
4	Tommy Gilbert defeated Buddy Landel	Singles match
5	Ian Rotten and Rollin' Hard defeated Corporal Robinson and Cash Flo	Tag Team match
6	Bull Pain (c) defeated Chip Fairway	Singles match for the IWA Mid-South Television Championship
7	Kip Morris defeated Rip Rogers by disqualification	Singles match
8	Doug Gilbert and Dutch Mantel defeated Dan Severn and Terry Gordy	Tag Team match with Buddy Landel as the special guest referee
(c) / – the champion(s) heading into the match
