= Charlie Fulton (wrestler) =

American professional wrestler (1949-2016)

Personal information
- Born: Gary Lee Fulton; 9 March 1949 Findlay, Ohio, U.S.
- Died: 12 March 2016 (aged 67)

Professional wrestling career
- Ring name(s): Charlie Fulton; Mighty Yankee #1; Gary Fulton; Charles Fulton; Black Demon; Demon #2; Charles Morrell; Mr. USSR
- Billed height: 6"2
- Billed weight: 240 lb (109 kg)
- Trained by: Lou Klein
- Debut: 1968
- Retired: 1992

Gary Lee Fulton (March 9, 1949 – March 12, 2016) was an American professional wrestler who worked in the World Wrestling Federation as Charlie Fulton from 1982 to 1985, Jim Crockett Promotions from 1972 to 1981 and various National Wrestling Alliance territories.

== Professional wrestling career ==
Fulton began his wrestling career in 1968 in Detroit. Later that year he was drafted into the US Army to fight in Vietnam and served two years there. In 1970, he returned to Detroit and later worked in various territories such as Florida and the Mid-Atlantic. In 1973, he teamed with Frank Morrell as the Mighty Yankees in NWA Mid-America winning the AWA Southern Tag Team Championship twice and the NWA Tennessee Tag Team Championship three times from 1973 to 1974.

After the Mighty Yankees split up in 1974, Fulton went on his own and worked in many territories in St. Louis, Georgia, Detroit and Toronto. He continued to work for Mid-Atlantic during the rest of the 1970s until 1981. Also went on three tours to Japan including one in 1980 where he was known as Mr. USSR billed from Soviet Union.

In January 1982, Fulton made his debut in the World Wrestling Federation. He also worked as the Black Demon. Also teamed with Baron Mikel Scicluna as the masked Demons from 1982 to 1983. He continued working as a heel jobber. Fulton wrestled at The Brawl to End It All losing to WWF World Martial Arts Heavyweight Champion Antonio Inoki. Later that night Fulton participated in a battle royal won by Inoki. His last WWF match was on August 9, 1985, as he lost to Paul Roma at Madison Square Garden.

He occasionally wrestled until his retirement in 1992.

== Personal life ==
Fulton trained many wrestlers including Raven, Chris Harris, Johnny Swinger, Barry Hardy, Ray Odyssey, Sean Casey and others.

After being diagnosed with heart failure in 1983, Fulton retired full-time from wrestling and became a corrections officer in Marion, Ohio until; his retirement in 2009.

== Death ==
Fulton died on March 12, 2016, three days after his 67th birthday from 33 years of heart failure.

== Championships and accomplishments ==
- NWA Mid-America
  - NWA Mid-America Tag Team Championship (1 time) – with Frank Morrell (1)
  - AWA Southern Tag Team Championship (2 times) – with Mighty Yankee #2 (1) and Bobby Jaggers (1)
  - NWA Tennessee Tag Team Championship (2 times) – with Mighty Yankee #2
- Other titles
  - Western Ohio Heavyweight Title
