= OVW Light Heavyweight Championship =

Professional wrestling championship

Details
- Promotion: Ohio Valley Wrestling
- Date established: February 9, 1999
- Date retired: March 1, 2001

Other name
- NWA Ohio Valley Light Heavyweight Championship
Statistics
- First champion: Jason Lee
- Most reigns: Jason Lee, Johnny Spade, Sean Casey (3 times each)
- Longest reign: Chris Michaels (323 days)
- Shortest reign: American Eagle (1 day)

The NWA Ohio Valley Light Heavyweight Championship, also known as the OVW Light Heavyweight Championship, was a title contested in Ohio Valley Wrestling (OVW). The title was created on February 9, 1999, and was retired on March 1, 2001, due to the company withdrawing its membership from the National Wrestling Alliance (NWA) in 2001 and becoming one of the first developmental territories for the World Wrestling Federation (WWF, now WWE). The final champion was Chris Michaels, who defeated the former champion Sean Casey at an OVW TV taping to win the title.

== Title history ==
Key
No.	Overall reign number
Reign	Reign number for the specific champion
Days	Number of days held

No.	Champion	Championship change			Reign statistics		Notes	Ref.
No.	Champion	Date	Event	Location	Reign	Days	Notes	Ref.
1	Jason Lee	February 9, 1999	OVW TV Tapings	Louisville, KY	1	36	Lee defeated American Eagle and Chris Alexander in a three-way match to become the inaugural champion.	
2	Johnny Spade	March 17, 1999	OVW TV Tapings	Jeffersonville, IN	1	6		
3	American Eagle	March 23, 1999	OVW TV Tapings	Louisville, KY	1	7		
4	Johnny Spade	March 30, 1999	OVW TV Tapings	Louisville, KY	2	14		
5	Chris Alexander	April 13, 1999	OVW TV Tapings	Louisville, KY	1	7		
6	Jason Lee	April 20, 1999	OVW TV Tapings	Louisville, KY	2	14		
7	American Eagle	May 4, 1999	OVW TV Tapings	Louisville, KY	2	1		
8	Jason Lee	May 5, 1999	OVW TV Tapings	Jeffersonville, IN	3	63		
9	Johnny Spade	July 7, 1999	OVW TV Tapings	Jeffersonville, IN	3	41		
10	Sean Casey	August 17, 1999	OVW TV Tapings	Louisville, KY	1	30		
11	Scotty Sabre	September 16, 1999	OVW TV Tapings	Jeffersonville, IN	1	83		
12	Sean Casey	December 8, 1999	OVW TV Tapings	Louisville, KY	2	43		
13	Chris Michaels	January 20, 2000	OVW TV Tapings	Jeffersonville, IN	1	55		
14	Sean Casey	March 15, 2000	OVW TV Tapings	Louisville, KY	3	28		
15	Chris Michaels	April 12, 2000	OVW TV Tapings	Jeffersonville, IN	2	323		
—	Deactivated	March 1, 2001	—	—	—	—	The championship was declared retired.	

== List of combined reigns ==
Rank	Wrestler	No. of reigns	Combined days
1	Chris Michaels	2	378
2	Jason Lee	3	113
3	Sean Casey	3	101
4	Scotty Sabre	1	83
5	Johnny Spade	3	61
6	American Eagle	2	8
7	Chris Alexander	1	7
