= IWA Mid-South Television Championship =

Professional wrestling championship

Details
- Promotion: IWA Mid-South
- Date established: September 30, 1997
- Date retired: April 2, 1998
Statistics
- First champion(s): Rollin' Hard
- Most reigns: Chip Fairway
- Longest reign: Rollin' Hard (195 days)
- Shortest reign: Cash Flo/Shark Boy (1 day each)

The IWA Mid-South Television Championship was a short-lived title in the IWA Mid-South based in Louisville, Kentucky. The title appeared from 1997, when Rollin' Hard won a ten-man Battle Royal to become the first ever champion.

== Title history ==
Wrestler:	Times:	Date:	Place:	Notes:
Rollin' Hard	1	September 30, 1997	Louisville, Kentucky	Defeated 9 other wrestlers in a Battle Royale
Cash Flo	1	December 4, 1997	Lexington, Kentucky	
Chip Fairway	1	December 9, 1997	Louisville, Kentucky	
Cash Flo	2	January 29, 1998	Louisville, Kentucky	
Chip Fairway	2	January 30, 1998	Lexington, Kentucky	
Bull Pain	1	February 7, 1998	New Albany, Indiana	
Chip Fairway	3	March 12, 1998	Louisville, Kentucky	
Shark Boy	1	April 2, 1998	Louisville, Kentucky	
Title Retired		April 2, 1998		IWA TV show is discontinued

== See also ==
- Independent Wrestling Association Mid-South
