= Lance Cade =

American professional wrestler (1981–2010)

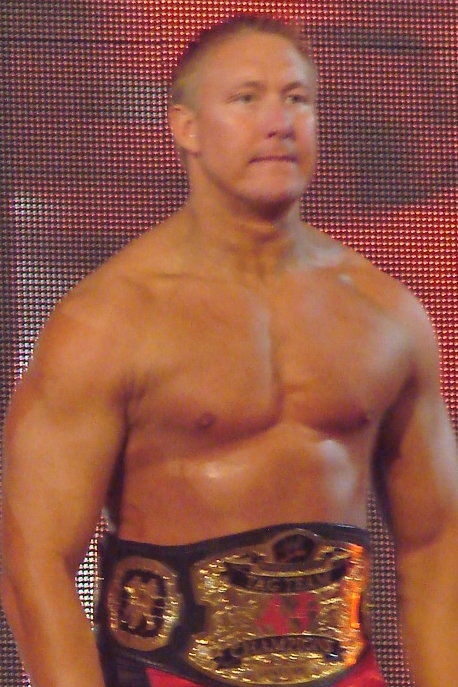
- Cade in 2007

Personal information
- Born: Lance Kurtis McNaught; March 2, 1981 Carroll, Iowa, U.S.
- Died: August 13, 2010 (aged 29) San Antonio, Texas, U.S.
- Cause of death: Accidental drug overdose
- Spouses: Tanya Gonzalez (m. 2000; div. 2006) (m. 2008)
- Children: 2

Professional wrestling career
- Ring name(s): Garrison Cade; Lance Cade
- Billed height: 6 ft 5 in (196 cm)
- Billed weight: 262 lb (119 kg)
- Billed from: San Antonio, Texas; Omaha, Nebraska; Nashville, Tennessee
- Trained by: Shawn Michaels; Rudy González
- Debut: November 6, 1999

Lance Kurtis McNaught (March 2, 1981 – August 13, 2010) was an American professional wrestler. He was best known for his time in World Wrestling Entertainment (WWE), where he performed under the ring name Lance Cade.

After being trained by Shawn Michaels, Cade made his debut in 1999 and worked in Japan before being signed to a developmental contract in February 2000 by WWE. He was assigned to Memphis Championship Wrestling (MCW), and later Heartland Wrestling Association (HWA), before ending up in Ohio Valley Wrestling (OVW) in 2003. He formed a tag team with Mark Jindrak in OVW and they were promoted to the Raw brand in June 2003. The team split up in March 2004, and Cade took time off after a knee injury, before returning to Raw with new tag partner Trevor Murdoch in August 2005. The pair teamed together for almost three years and won the World Tag Team Championship three times before they broke up in May 2008. Cade then formed an alliance with Chris Jericho, however, he was released in October 2008.

== Professional wrestling career ==
=== Early career (1999–2001) ===
McNaught started his professional wrestling career by becoming a student of Shawn Michaels at the Shawn Michaels Wrestling Academy in San Antonio, Texas in 1999.

Cade and fellow wrestler Bryan Danielson went to Japan on December 1, 1999. They competed in Frontier Martial-Arts Wrestling (FMW). Cade and Danielson worked as a tag team for a while before they went their separate ways; Cade stayed in FMW and faced off against Extreme Championship Wrestling wrestler Balls Mahoney in tag team matches and a three-way dance against another FMW wrestler. Cade left FMW after he was defeated by Mahoney in a three-way dance on February 25, 2000, also involving Crazy Boy.

=== World Wrestling Federation / World Wrestling Entertainment (2001–2008) ===
==== Heartland Wrestling Association (2001–2002) ====
After Cade signed with the World Wrestling Federation (WWF), he was sent to Memphis Championship Wrestling in 2001. During the summer of that same year, he was moved to Les Thatcher's Heartland Wrestling Association (HWA). Cade quickly formed a tag-team with Surfer Cody Hawk, but the team split after only a few months when Cade joined the World Championship Wrestling camp in HWA's Invasion angle. Cade aligned with Mike Sanders, a former WCW wrestler. The downfall of the team came on February 13, 2002, when Lance Cade and Mike Sanders defeated Val Venis and Steve Bradley to win the HWA Tag-Team titles. Cade and Sanders broke up that very day, and the titles were vacated. The next week, Cade faced Sanders and defeated him in a singles match, giving Cade the belts. Cade then chose Steve Bradley to be his new partner. However, Cade and Bradley had problems defeating WWF competition, as Hugh Morrus and Raven defeated on March 12, 2002, for the titles. Cade and Bradley, however, won the HWA Tag Titles three days later.

In April 2002, Cade's first HWA tag-team partner returned, as Cody Hawk and the Ice Cream Man defeated Cade and Bradley for the tag-team titles. Cade and Bradley tried for the next month to get the titles back, even winning a tag team championship contendership match to get another shot, but never managed to get the titles back. On May 19, 2002, Cade defeated Johnny the Bull to become the HWA Heavyweight Champion. Cade defended the title for 2 months before Johnny the Bull won the title back on July 20. On the same night, however, Cade defeated Johnny in a second match, becoming the 2-time Heavyweight Champion. This reign lasted only one day, as Cade, lost his title to Cody Hawk.

==== Ohio Valley Wrestling (2003–2004) ====
During the summer of 2002, the HWA was dropped as a developmental territory by the renamed World Wrestling Entertainment (WWE), but Cade was transferred over to WWE's main developmental company, Ohio Valley Wrestling when he signed a developmental contract in 2003. Cade continued to search for a strong tag-team partner to work with. He found René Duprée and both joined Kenny Bolin's Bolin Services. The two worked as a tag-team throughout most of their stay in OVW.

In the OVW Tag Team Championship Tournament contested in February/March 2003, Cade and Duprée defeated Matt Morgan and BJ Payne, but could not beat the Disciples of Synn in the finals. Cade and Duprée had another shot at Spring Break-Out 2003, but the current champions at the time were WWE regulars The APA, and Cade and Duprée could not overcome the odds. Mark Jindrak later joined Bolin Services. Duprée appeared in WWE only a few weeks after their title shot. Cade continued tagging with Mark Jindrak, but was promoted to the Raw brand in June 2003 under the name, Garrison Cade.

==== Teaming with Mark Jindrak (2003–2005) ====
Cade debuted on an episode of Sunday Night Heat against Lance Storm on June 1, who forced him to submit to the Sharpshooter. The next week on Raw, he faced Storm in a re-match. Stone Cold Steve Austin came out interrupted, chanting the word "Boring", and Storm became distracted, allowing Cade to sneak in and get the victory. Soon afterwards, Cade again found a tag-team partner in Mark Jindrak and began to challenge for the World Tag Team Championship. The belts were being held by former Cade ally René Duprée and his new partner Sylvain Grenier, a unit collectively known as La Résistance.

Over the next few months, Cade and Jindrak fought against many different teams, from La Resistance and the face gimmicks of the Dudley Boyz to battles against the top heels on Raw, Evolution. The duo also formed a semi-partnership with then babyface, Maven, helping each other out on occasion. Cade and Jindrak soon began to be known more for their cheating ways, however, rather than their abilities. This led them to turn heel and be entered into the Tag-Team Turmoil Match at Armageddon for the World Tag Team Championship. They came in from the crowd when their turn hit and quickly rolled up The Hurricane to eliminate him and Rosey. Cade and Jindrak next faced a face gimmick of Lance Storm and Val Venis, and Cade tripped up Venis from the outside on a suplex attempt, then held onto Venis' legs while Jindrak made the pinfall. The next team to come down were the Dudley Boyz, who eventually took out Jindrak with the 3-D to eliminate the boys. The duo got some revenge, though, attacking the Dudley Boyz after the match before leaving, making it harder for the Dudley Boyz to come out victorious (which they did not, losing at the end to then heels, Ric Flair and Batista).

Going into 2004, Cade and Jindrak continued to work together as a team, firmly entrenched in the mid-card ranks. The team got a win in March 2004, when they defeated The Hurricane and Rosey to earn a shot at the World Tag Team Championship at WrestleMania XX. Cade and Jindrak entered a four-way tag match against the champions, then babyface, Booker T and Rob Van Dam, and the other two competing teams, La Résistance and the Dudley Boyz. Cade and Jindrak lost the match, though, after Rob Van Dam pinned Rob Conway. After Jindrak was drafted to the SmackDown! brand, Cade briefly associated himself with Jonathan Coachman, helping Coachman get a win over Tajiri at Backlash. Cade later teamed up with Coachman at Vengeance to take on the debuting team of Rhyno and Tajiri. Cade and Coachman lost the match, and Cade was taken off WWE television after an injury in July 2004.

While off WWE television for quite some time, Cade returned to OVW in 2005 under his former ring name Lance Cade in order begin a return to the main roster. Cade sided with The Blueprint Matt Morgan and Vengeance against the OVW Heavyweight Champion Elijah Burke. In February 2005, Cade took on Burke in a $5,000 Bounty Match, but was defeated. Cade faded into the background for the next few weeks, eventually making his return to the ring at the June 3 OVW Summer Sizzler Series 2005 show, taking on Al Snow. While Cade brought his cowboy hat with him, Snow brought Head, routinely turning to the mannequin head for guidance. During the match, when Cade was knocked to the outside, Snow destroyed Cade's hat, stomping on it. This made the match more personal to Cade, but in the end, Snow knocked out Cade with Head, getting the victory. Later that night, Cade interfered in the Brent Albright/Elijah Burke OVW Heavyweight Title match, with Cade attacking the champion, Albright. The two foes had a No Disqualification, Loser Must Tap Out Match at the OVW Summer Sizzler Series 2005 show on June 17, 2005. Cade tried to pin Albright early in the match. The ref did not allow it, causing a shoving match between the two. Later in the match, Albright got his Crowbar submission on Cade, but Cade escaped, then appeared to be leaving, with Albright chasing him down. Albright got the Crowbar applied on Cade again, right on the ramp. With nowhere to go, Cade was forced to tap, losing to Albright.

==== Teaming with Trevor Murdoch (2005–2008) ====
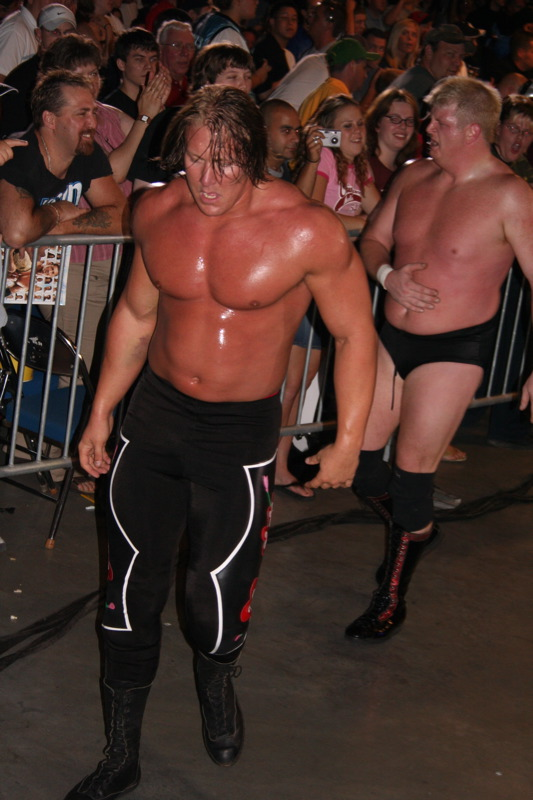
Cade (left) with his tag team partner Trevor Murdoch in 2005

On August 22, 2005, a promo was shown on Raw showcasing a long-haired Cade, who was soon to be returning with tag team partner Trevor Murdoch. The promo showed Cade and Murdoch portraying rednecks, with Cade (who retained his real first name) playing the role of a smooth-talking cowboy while Murdoch was depicted as an angry Southern trucker.

Cade and Murdoch debuted as a team on Raw on September 5, 2005. They defeated the World Tag Team Champions, the Hurricane and Rosey in a non-title match. This earned them a World Tag Team title shot at Unforgiven. During the title match, Murdoch delivered an elevated DDT on The Hurricane to the outside. The DDT caused Hurricane to suffer a kayfabe stinger. It also allowed Cade and Murdoch to defeat Hurricane and Rosey for the World Tag Team championships. They defended against random teams on Raw for the next month before losing the titles to Big Show and Kane at Taboo Tuesday. After losing in a rematch on the November 7 episode of Raw, Cade and Murdoch began to be squashed by other tag teams, before wrestling singles matches.

On the November 28 episode of Raw, it was announced that Cade and Murdoch had parted ways as a tag team. The next week, Cade debuted with the gimmick of a "Refined Southern Gentleman," wearing new tights with rhinestones on them as well as his new jacket he wore to the ring. Cade was relegated to Heat, making very few appearances on Raw at the end of 2005. He had a chance to get into the 2006 Royal Rumble, competing with Rob Conway and Gregory Helms against the Big Show in a Second Chance Battle Royal. However, The Big Show won the spot in the Rumble.

Eventually, the Cade and Murdoch tandem reformed as they were seen helping Chris Masters and Carlito attack Kane. On the edition of April 14 of Heat, it was announced that Cade and Murdoch were reuniting as a tag team after Murdoch helped Cade defeat Goldust. Cade also debuted another slight change with wet hair and shorter tights with a design similar to when he was teaming with Murdoch. On the edition of May 19 of Heat Cade and Murdoch officially reformed their tag team by facing and defeating Charlie Haas and Viscera.

Cade and Murdoch next entered a short-lived feud against D-Generation X (Triple H and Shawn Michaels). It started when Cade and Murdoch ambushed Shawn Michaels and Triple H, before Triple H's match with Vince McMahon on the September 11 episode of Raw. Cade and Murdoch continued to battle DX, until they were defeated in a street fight, ending the feud on the October 9 episode of Raw.

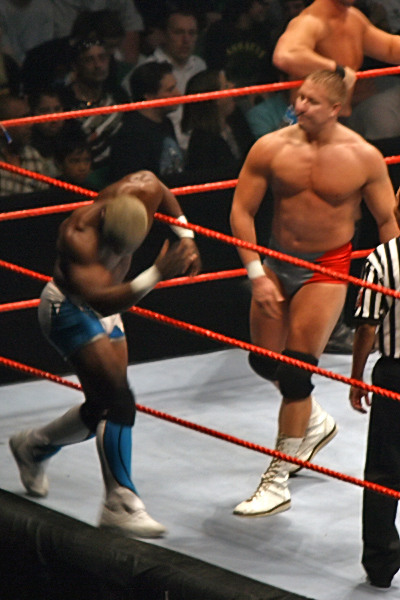
Cade slaps opponent Shelton Benjamin prior to a match.

After biding much of their time on Raw's sister show Heat, Cade and Murdoch began a feud in April with World Tag Team Champions The Hardys, leading to their title match at Backlash, which The Hardys won. In the storyline, Cade and Murdoch suddenly gained a great deal of respect for The Hardys and began to praise their abilities. The Hardys then began an alliance with Cade and Murdoch. Despite the alliance, Cade and Murdoch faced The Hardys in a rematch at Judgment Day which The Hardys won. On the edition of June 4 of Raw, Cade and Murdoch were given another shot at the World Tag Team Championship against The Hardys and were successful, becoming two time World Tag Team Champions. When Cade made the pin on Jeff Hardy, Hardy's foot was on the ropes but was pushed off by Murdoch. After the match, when Matt Hardy argued with Cade and Murdoch, they attacked Matt and Jeff with the tag belts, becoming heels again. At Vengeance: Night of Champions, Cade and Murdoch defeated the Hardys to retain the gold after Cade pinned Jeff. Cade along with Murdoch lost the titles at a house show on September 5 to Paul London and Brian Kendrick on a South Africa tour. Later on, in that same tour, Cade and Murdoch won the titles back. After 93 days, their third reign came to an end on December 10 at the Raw XV anniversary, when they lost the championship to the team of Hardcore Holly and Cody Rhodes. On December 28, Cade separated his shoulder at a house show in Atlanta, and was inactive for the next month. Cade made his return, teaming with Murdoch, on the February 4 episode of Raw, in a losing effort to Holly and Rhodes.

Late in April 2008, Murdoch began to develop a country singing gimmick. On the May 12 episode of Raw, Cade turned on Murdoch following a "victory song," punching Murdoch in the face twice, ending the partnership. The two faced off on the edition of June 2, 2008 of Raw, with Cade getting the victory to end their feud.

==== Alliance with Chris Jericho (2008) ====
Cade formed an alliance with Chris Jericho on the June 16 airing of Raw when he assisted Jericho in laying out John Cena and Triple H. In the following weeks, Cade began accompanying Jericho to the ring for his matches, becoming a protégé of sorts and aiding him in his feud with Shawn Michaels. Cade claimed that, being a former protégé of Michaels, he was not going to wait for him to turn on him like Michaels did several past partners.

At a Raw house show in early August, Cade suffered a broken nose in a match against Paul London, who was also busted open as a result of a botched move. Cade returned to in-ring action on Raw on September 22 in a handicap match with Jericho and John "Bradshaw" Layfield, defeating Michaels and Batista, with Cade pinning his former mentor. Michaels would then defeat Cade one-on-one in a no disqualification match on the October 6 episode, in what was Cade's last appearance. On October 14, 2008, Cade was released from his WWE contract. Jim Ross later stated that "he made a major league mistake while utilizing bad judgment" and that it was instrumental to his departure, also noting that Cade having a seizure on a plane and needed emergency medical care.

=== Independent circuit (2008–2009) ===
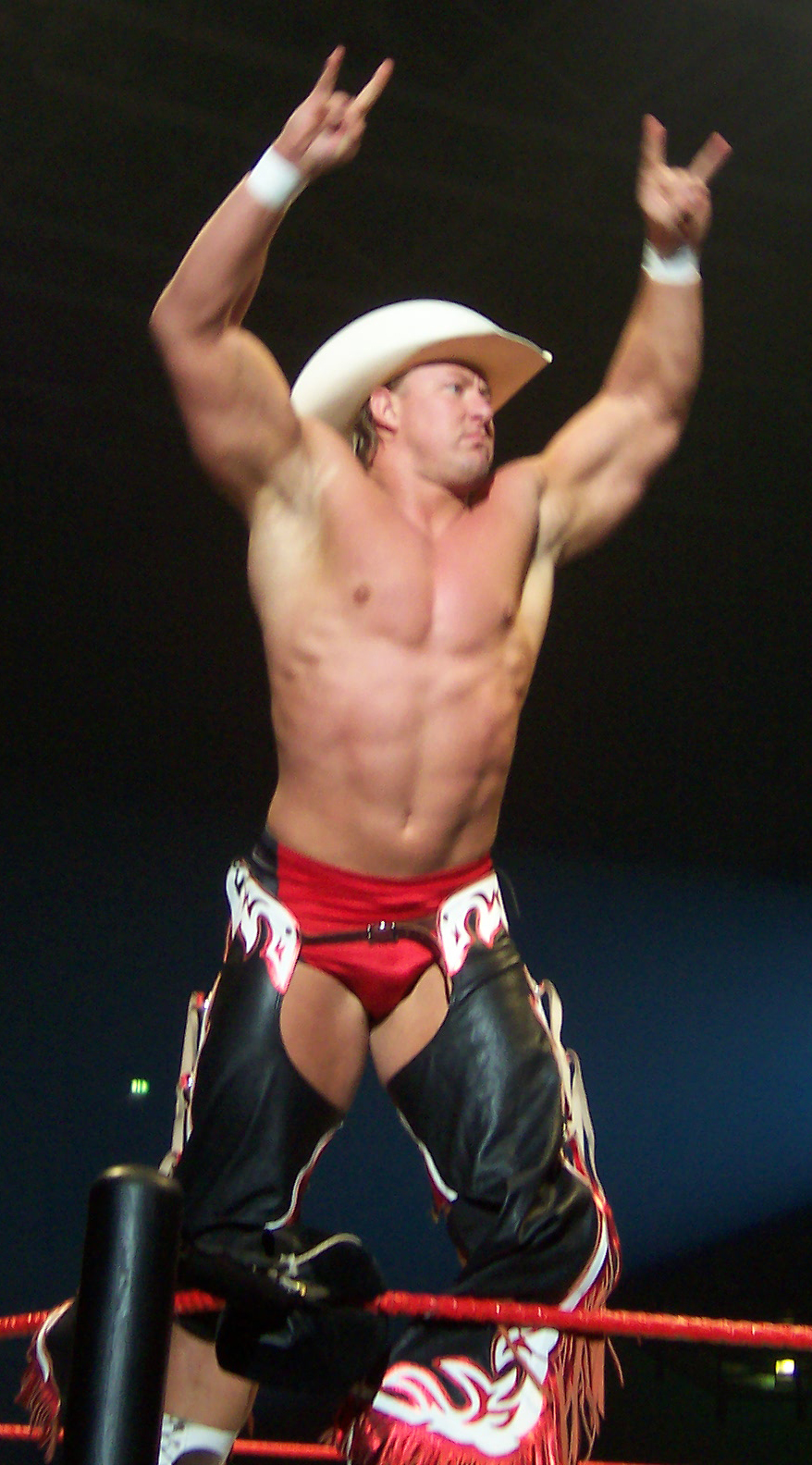
Cade in 2007

Less than a week after Cade's release, he began accepting bookings with Trevor Murdoch as a team on the independent circuit, including Independent Wrestling Association Mid-South as well as NWA Showcase.

Cade returned to Japan in December 2008 teaming with his former tag team partner René Duprée for Hustle on December 24 and 25. They appeared as masked wrestlers, Dyna and Might Sharpe, a parody of the Sharpe Brothers. The team defeated Tenyru and Koshinaka both nights. Five nights later they had their third and final match with Tenyru and Koshinaka and HUSTLEMANIA in a losing effort. Cade returned as "Cowboy" Cade, his former WWE character, on February 19 at Korakuen Hall to defeat the tag team of Tajiri and Akebono when Cade pinned Tajiri. On February 22, Cade defeated Akebono in a singles match in the main event of Hustle's debut show in Chiba, Japan.

Cade was scheduled to face NWA North American Heavyweight Champion Apollo in an NWA On Fire event on August 22, 2009, but was unable to attend due to a family emergency. He wrestled Trevor Murdoch at a World Stars of Wrestling event in September 2009.

=== Return to WWE (2009–2010) ===
In September 2009, Cade was re-signed by World Wrestling Entertainment (WWE), appearing in its developmental territory Florida Championship Wrestling (FCW), but was released in April 2010 without returning to the main roster.

=== All Japan Pro Wrestling (2010) ===
In May 2010, Cade began wrestling for All Japan Pro Wrestling, where he joined the Voodoo Murders stable. He participated in AJPW's "Rise Up" and "Cross Over" tours. He primarily wrestled alongside his stablemates such as René Duprée, Hate, Minoru, and TARU in tag team matches and six-man tag team matches. He wrestled what became the final match of his career on July 4, 2010, defeating Seiya Sanada. At the time of his death, he had been scheduled to challenge for the World Tag Team Championship alongside René Duprée.

== Other media ==
Cade made his video game debut as a playable character in WWE Day of Reckoning and then also appeared in WWE WrestleMania 21, WWE SmackDown! vs. Raw, WWE SmackDown vs. Raw 2007, and WWE SmackDown vs. Raw 2009.

== Personal life ==
McNaught married Tanya Gonzalez on June 14, 2000, but they divorced on May 16, 2006. In September 2008, he and Tanya remarried in Las Vegas, NV, and they remained married until his death in 2010. He had two daughters, Natallye and Laryssa, and a stepson named Brian. Tanya is the daughter of professional wrestler Black Gordman.

In January 2010, McNaught attended rehabilitation, and completed a 30-day program in February.

== Death ==
McNaught died on August 13, 2010, at the age of 29 of apparent heart failure in San Antonio, Texas. His wife Tanya had noticed that he was not looking well in the week prior to his death. He was taken to a hospital on August 10, 2010, with difficulty breathing, but discharged himself the next day. Two months later, on October 13, 2010, a staffer of the San Antonio medical examiner said he had accidentally died from "mixed drug intoxication, complicating a cardiomyopathy".

A "Lance Cade Tribute Show" took place on March 5, 2011, at the Texas Wrestling Academy Gym in San Antonio.

== Championships and accomplishments ==
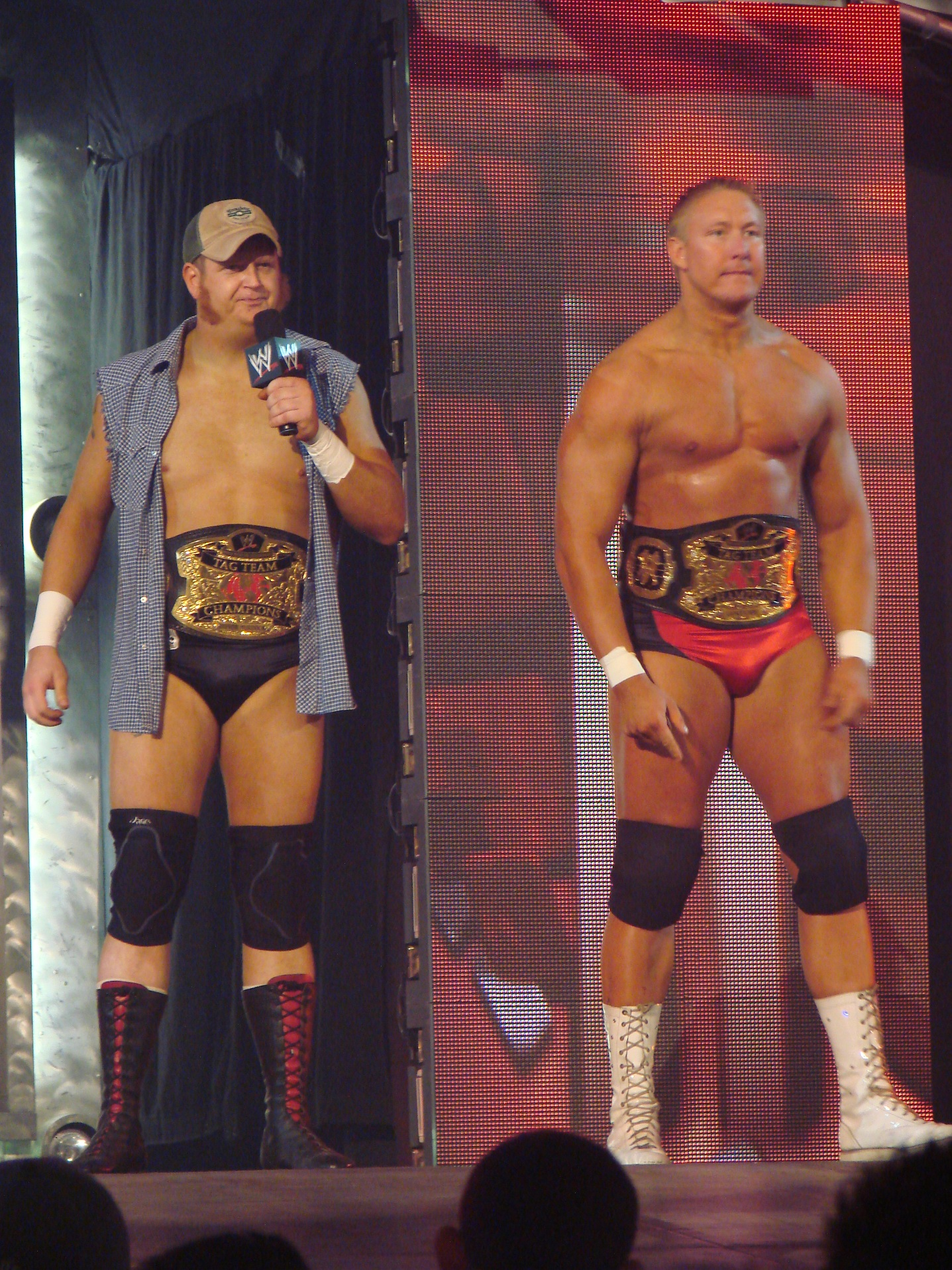
Cade (right) is a three time World Tag Team Champion, along with Trevor Murdoch (left).

- Heartland Wrestling Association
  - HWA Heavyweight Championship (2 times)
  - HWA Tag Team Championship (3 times) – with Steve Bradley (2) and Mike Sanders (1)
- Pro Wrestling Illustrated
  - Ranked No. 80 of the top 500 singles wrestlers in the PWI 500 in 2008
- Texas Wrestling Alliance
  - TWA Television Championship (1 time)
- World Wrestling Entertainment
  - World Tag Team Championship (3 times) – with Trevor Murdoch

== See also ==
- List of premature professional wrestling deaths
