= Sean Casey (wrestler) =

American professional wrestler (born 1972)

Personal information
- Born: February 1, 1972 (age 54) Cincinnati, Ohio, U.S.

Professional wrestling career
- Ring name(s): K.C. Sunshine; Sean Casey; Steve Casey
- Billed height: 5 ft 10 in (178 cm)
- Billed weight: 209 lb (95 kg)
- Billed from: Cincinnati, Ohio
- Trained by: Charlie Fulton; Brian Pillman
- Debut: 1992

Sean Casey (born February 1, 1972) is an American professional wrestler who wrestles on the Southeast independent circuit. He has made appearances in World Championship Wrestling, the World Wrestling Federation, and in Total Nonstop Action Wrestling. He also appeared in the magazine Playgirl in 1997.

== Professional wrestling career ==
Casey began his career in 1995, making appearances in World Championship Wrestling (WCW) under the names Steve Casey and K.C. Sunshine. He did not become well known till he posed for Playgirl in 1997. In 1998 he wrestled a few matches for the World Wrestling Federation (WWF) on WWF Shotgun Saturday Night against Too Much. Casey then signed a contract with the WWF and began working in their developmental territory Ohio Valley Wrestling (OVW).

Then in 2003, he worked a few matches for Total Nonstop Action Wrestling (TNA) on TNA Xplosion. In 2005 he regularly worked for Blue Water Championship Wrestling, Ultimate Championship Wrestling, and Ohio Championship Wrestling. He then began wrestling in Showtime All-Star Wrestling and United States Wrestling Organization in Tennessee.

Presently, he tours with and is a founding member of the 5 Most Wanted.

== Personal life ==
Sean has 1 adult daughter and is presently single. He resides on Cincinnati's east side with his dog, Amiga.

== Championships and accomplishments ==
- 304 Wrestling
  - 304 Championship (2 times)
  - 304 Tag Team Championship (2 time) - with Buff Bagwell & with Brian Masters
- Blue Water Championship Wrestling
  - BWCW Cruiserweight Championship (1 time)
  - BWCW Heavyweight Championship (2 times)
- Frontier Elite Wrestling
  - 2009 Total Elimination Champion(2 time)
  - FEW Championship (2 time)
- Future Great Wrestling
  - FGW Championship (1 time)
- Heartland Wrestling Association
  - HWA Tag Team Championship (1 time) - with Brian Taylor
- NWA Circle City Wrestling
  - NWA CCW Tag Team Championship (1 time) – with Rob Conway
- Northern Wrestling Federation
  - NWF Tag Team Championship (1 time) – with Chris Harris
- Ohio Championship Wrestling
  - OCW Heavyweight Championship (2 times, first)
  - OCW United States Championship (1 time)
- Ohio Valley Wrestling
  - OVW Light Heavyweight Championship (3 times)
- Showtime All-Star Wrestling
  - SAW Tag Team Championship (1 time) - with Chris Michaels
- Universal Championship Wrestling
  - UCW Heavyweight Championship (1 time)
- Vendetta Pro Wrestling
  - Vendetta Pro Wrestling Heavyweight Championship (1 time, Inaugural)
  - Vendetta Pro Wrestling International Tag Team Championship (1 time, current) - with Cody Hawk
  - Casino Royal Royal Rumble (2014)
  - Cauliflower Alley Cup (2014)
- World Class Professional Big Time Wrestling
  - WCPBTW Ohio State Tag Team Championship (1 time) - with Bobby Fulton
