= Queen City Sportsplex =

Multipurpose sports arena

- Interactive map of Queen City Sportsplex
- Location: Evendale, Ohio
- Coordinates: 39°15′48″N 84°25′10″W
- Capacity: 1,200
- Surface: Ice

Tenant
- Cincinnati Jr. Cyclones (USPHL) (2021–present)

Queen City Sportsplex (formerly known as Sports Plus Arena), is a 1,200 seat multi-purpose arena in Evendale, Ohio, USA. The ice arena has two sheets of ice for ice hockey, figure skating, broomball, sled hockey and open skating. The arena also houses Shooters Bar and Grill, arcade games, two concessions, Northlands Pro Shop, an inflatable zone, roller hockey, six basketball courts that are also used for volleyball, and a sports trainer.

Originally housing a Makro warehouse club (a road leading to the arena's parking lot maintains the name 'Makro Drive'), the building was converted into an arena at some point in time.

The complex changed its name to Queen City Sportsplex in 2024.
