= Shark Boy =

American professional wrestler (born 1975)

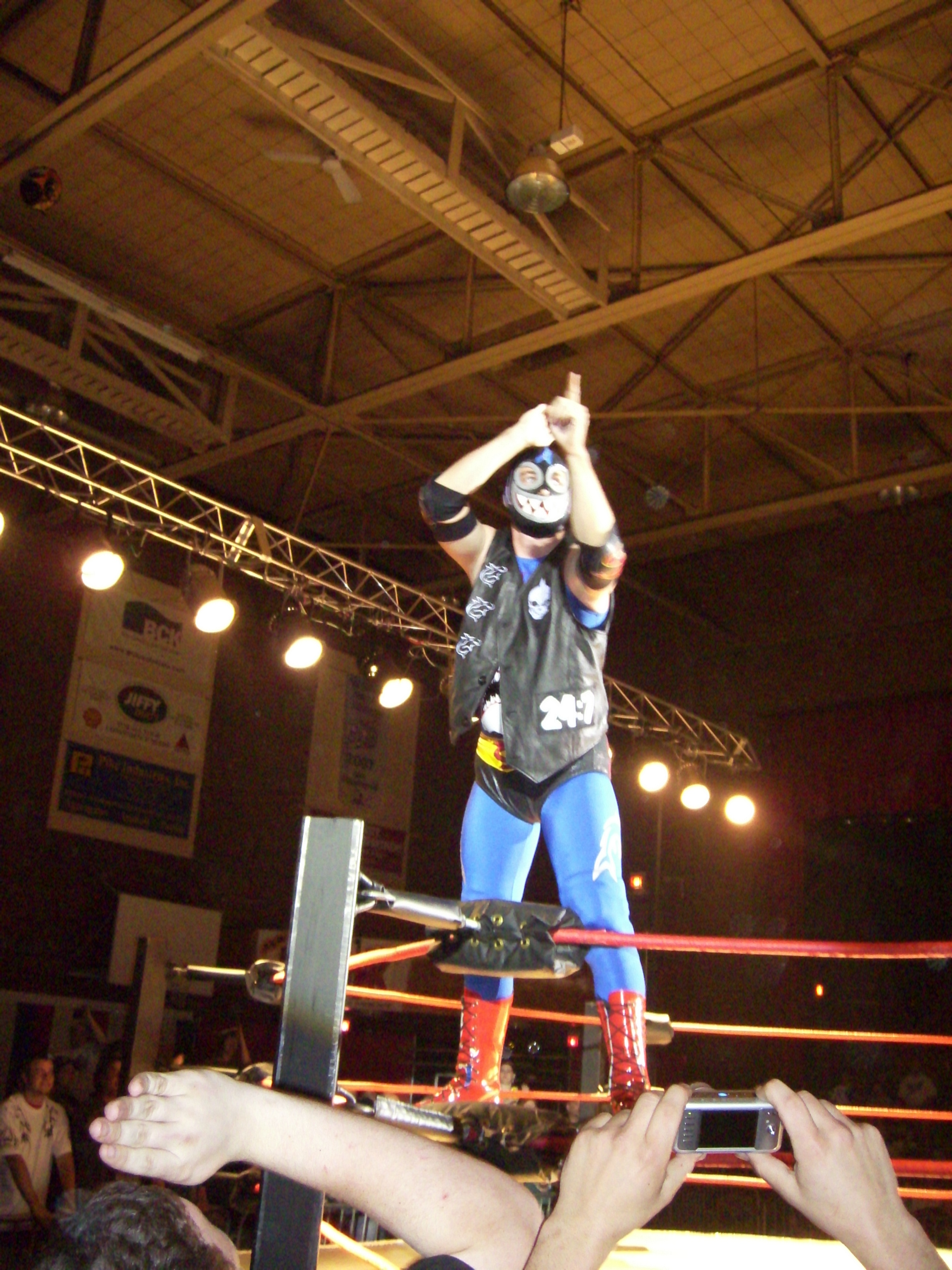
- Shark Boy in 2008

Personal information
- Born: Dean Matthew Roll; January 28, 1975 (age 51) Dayton, Ohio, U.S.

Professional wrestling career
- Ring name(s): El Piranha; Dean Baldwin; Dean Roll; Shark Boy
- Billed height: 5 ft 10 in (1.78 m)
- Billed weight: 180 lb (82 kg)
- Billed from: The Deep (Blue) Sea; Twenty Thousand Leagues Under the Seas
- Trained by: Les Thatcher
- Debut: May 3, 1997

Dean Matthew Roll (born January 28, 1975) is an American professional wrestler, best known for his appearances in Total Nonstop Action Wrestling (TNA) under the ring name Shark Boy. Prior to his appearances in TNA, Roll competed on the independent scene from the mid-1990s onwards before being signed by World Championship Wrestling (WCW) in 1999. Following his release from WCW six months later in 2000, Roll returned to the independent scenes, mainly competing for the World Wrestling All-Stars (WWA) promotion. He would leave WWA in 2002 to join TNA, where he became a member of the TNA X Division. He would make sporadic appearances in TNA from 2009 onwards.

== Professional wrestling career ==
=== Early Career (1997–2001) ===
Roll began training under Les Thatcher in October 1995 at the age of twenty. He debuted on May 3, 1997, in Thatcher's Heartland Wrestling Association, wrestling as the masked El Piranha. An HWA mainstay, Roll also occasionally portrayed the character of Dean Baldwin, the purported fifth, lesser known Baldwin brother.

Later that year, Roll debuted in the Independent Wrestling Association, where he developed the cartoonish character Shark Boy, partly inspired by the 1995 song "I Come From the Water" by the Toadies. In 1999, Roll trademarked the name "Shark Boy". In 1998 and 1999, Shark Boy received a flurry of media attention. He was featured on ABC in an episode of 20/20 featuring professional wrestling, on the Discovery Channel as part of the annual Shark Week and on a documentary produced by MTV entitled True Life: I'm a Professional Wrestler.

On May 19, 1999, Shark Boy wrestled at the second annual Brian Pillman Memorial Show, defeating Matt Stryker, Tarek the Great and Chip Fairway in a tournament and receiving a trophy. Following the match, numerous World Championship Wrestling and World Wrestling Federation wrestlers, including Al Snow, Mankind and D'Lo Brown, entered the ring and lifted Shark Boy onto their shoulders. Shark Boy also wrestled at the 1998, 2000 and 2001 Brian Pillman Memorial Shows.

=== World Championship Wrestling (1999–2000) ===
As a result of the exposure gained by his appearances on television and at the Brian Pillman Memorial Shows, coupled with his "cult" following, Shark Boy was signed to a contract by World Championship Wrestling in 1999. He made several appearances on WCW Saturday Night and WCW Thunder on TBS before being released six months later in March 2000.

=== World Wrestling All Stars (2002) ===
In February 2002 Shark Boy competed for the WWA at their Revolution PPV in Las Vegas. He fought in the opening contest, a 6-Man Cruiserweight survival match. Also in the match were A.J. Styles, Christopher Daniels, Low Ki, Tony Mamaluke, and Nova. He was eliminated first in the match, which was won by Nova.

In November 2002, Shark Boy toured Europe with the World Wrestling All-Stars promotion. At the Retribution pay-per-view on December 6, 2002, Shark Boy defeated Frankie Kazarian. During this same time from 2002 till its closing, Shark Boy joined and toured with XPW where he had memorable bouts with Kaos, Tracy Smothers, Juventud Guerrera, and Jerry Lynn.

On March 7, 2004, Shark Boy opened a professional wrestling school named The Shark Tank in Ohio. His most notable trainees are Dustin Thomas, Tom Bellman, Darrell Hazel, Jerrod West, Todd Mullins, Ed Gonzales, Donny Redd, Chris Ledbetter, Jake Omen, Tony X and Cannonball Sami (Sami Callihan)

=== World Wrestling Entertainment (2003) ===
On March 11, 2003, Shark Boy wrestled a dark match for the World Wrestling Entertainment where he lost to Chris Kanyon. A month later on April 21, he lost to Christopher Nowinski on Sunday Night Heat which aired on April 27.

=== Total Nonstop Action Wrestling (2002–2015) ===
On July 31, 2002, Shark Boy made his Total Nonstop Action Wrestling (TNA) debut in a dark match losing to Jimmy Rave.

On the August 14, 2002 weekly TNA pay-per-view, Shark Boy showed up on Disco Inferno's talk segment Jive Talkin' without his mask playing the character Dean Baldwin, a fictional brother of the famous Baldwin actors.

In 2003, he had a team with New Jack that involved getting New Jack to play board games such as Chutes and Ladders with Shark Boy. When New Jack left, Mad Mikey started teaming with Shark Boy before his untimely death in November 2003 and in 2004, he teamed with D-Ray 3000 which was his most successful tag team run. In 2008, he returned to TNA after a brief hiatus from a kayfabe coma suffered from multiple ambushes, and tweaked his Shark Boy gimmick into that of a Stone Cold Steve Austin tribute, even going as far as to drink "Clam Juice" (a reference to Austin's infamous beer drinking) in the ring after his matches. Upon his gimmick change, he would occasionally team up with Curry Man to form a comedic tag team that was a moderate success. After this gimmick change he started to talk, something he had not been heard to do before.

Shark Boy took part in TNA's TerrorDome match on May 10, but it was won by Kaz. Because of that TerrorDome match, Shark Boy was injured; he returned backstage on the July 17 episode of Impact! with Curry Man and Super Eric as part of a Justice League knock off, called The Prince Justice Brotherhood (a reference to Abyss' former name Prince Justice), where he got whipped by Beer Money, Inc. during a backstage segment. He appeared again with the Brotherhood on the July 24 episode of Impact!. Roll returned on the February 5 edition of Impact!, only to lose to the debuting Brutus Magnus in a squash match. He returned at the August 18 tapings of Impact!, only to lose against Sheik Abdul Bashir in a match broadcast on the TNA website. He was again featured on a web match after the August 31 tapings of Impact!, in another losing effort to Consequences Creed. This was his last match with the company for some time, and on October 13, 2010, Shark Boy's profile was removed from TNA's website while he spent some time working as a referee and road agent for the company.

On December 5, 2010, Shark Boy made his return at Final Resolution, forcing Cookie into a shark cage during Robbie E's and Jay Lethal's match for the TNA X Division Championship. After the match, he gave Cookie a Chummer. He changed his theme back to the theme he used before the Austin gimmick began. He made his return to the ring on the December 24 edition of Xplosion, in a losing effort against Robbie E. On March 3, 2011, Shark Boy announced on his website that he had requested and was granted his release from TNA.

On July 10, 2011, Shark Boy made an appearance at Destination X teaming with Eric Young defeating Generation Me. Shark Boy made his return to TNA on the May 23, 2013 episode of Impact Wrestling. He wrestled against Robbie E in a losing effort on the following episode of TNA Xplosion after his TV appearance. On March 17, 2013, Shark Boy appeared on TNA 10 Reunion where he was in a 10-man Gauntlet match, which was won by Matt Morgan, that aired on August 2, 2013. On March 19, 2013, Shark Boy next appeared on Hardcore Justice 2 where he won a nine-man Hardcore Gauntlet Battle Royal, which aired on July 5, 2013. He then made another appearance on November 21 at TNA Turning Point, facing Ethan Carter III in a losing effort. On October 2, 2014, Shark Boy made yet another appearance facing off against Manik and losing, then lost again on the October 15, 2014 show against Tyrus. He made an appearance in the October 29 taping during a backstage segment where he was signing autographs, getting a pep talk from road agent Pat Kenney to get back to being "the real shark" referring to when he was in his prime. Shark Boy said he would do it. On the July 9, 2015 episode of Impact, he returned as a competitor in Ethan Carter III's 3 vs 1 Gauntlet Match for the TNA World Heavyweight Championship in a losing effort. This would be his last known appearance and would eventually parted ways from the company.

=== Return to the independent circuit (2013–present) ===
In August 2013, Shark Boy challenged Billy Mattern for the NWA Supreme United States Championship. Billy Mattern was disqualified due to interference by Mortimer Blankenship giving the win to Shark Boy, but Mattern would retain the championship.

Shark Boy started wrestling a lot less starting in 2014, where he only wrestled a half dozen matches. This would be followed with even less in 2015 and only one match in 2016. The following two years saw him competing in less than a dozen matches total. He didn't wrestle from November 2018, until April 2019 when he was involved in a six way scramble match at Joey Ryan's Penis Party WrestleCon event during WrestleMania 35 weekend.

=== Return to Total Nonstop Action Wrestling (2022–present) ===
On May 1, 2022, it was announced that Shark Boy would make his return to Impact Wrestling for live events on May 7 and 8 in Newport, Kentucky. At Slammiversary, on June 19, 2022, Shark Boy won the Reverse Battle Royal by last eliminating Johnny Swinger.

=== All Elite Wrestling (2026) ===
On July 29, 2026, Shark Boy made an appearance on the AEW Advance show to promote both that weeks episode of AEW Dynamite and Shark Week.

== Other media ==
Shark Boy has appeared in two video games, those being TNA Impact!: Cross the Line and TNA IMPACT!

He was featured in MTV's "True Life: I am a Pro Wrestler", talking about his experiences on the independent circuit.

== Personal life ==
On Friday, February 22, 2008, he was inducted into the XWF (later Legends Pro Wrestling) Hall of Fame. Around the same time, Roll had just started the "Stone Cold" Shark Boy gimmick (at TNA Final Resolution in January 2008). After waking up from a kayfabe coma, he would drink clam juice and use the Stone Cold Stunner in his matches.

Roll lost most of his possessions including practically all of his ring gear and personal property in a house fire in February 2009.

=== Miramax lawsuit ===
On June 8, 2005, Roll filed a lawsuit against Miramax Films, claiming that the Miramax release The Adventures of Sharkboy and Lavagirl in 3-D infringed upon his trademark and demanded any "money, profits and advantages wrongfully gained". In November 2005, it emerged that Miramax had attempted to have the case dismissed, in addition to requesting that the court nullify Roll's trademark on the basis that "Plaintiff is a male whose services are rendered only when he is wearing a costume depicting 'shark-like' attributes." In April 2007, the suit was settled for an undisclosed amount.

== Championships and accomplishments ==
- Atlantic Pro Wrestling
  - APW Junior Heavyweight Championship (2 times)
- Buckeye Pro Wrestling
  - BPW Heavyweight Championship (2 times)
  - BPW Team Championship (2 times) – with Cody Hawk
- Blue Water Championship Wrestling
  - BWCW Cruiserweight Championship (1 time)
- Eastern Pro Wrestling
  - EPW Tag Team Championship (1 time) – with Rocco Abruzzi
- Hardcore Championship Wrestling
  - HCW Heavyweight Championship (1 time)
  - Incredible 8 Tournament (2002)
- Heartland Wrestling Association
  - HWA Cruiserweight Championship (3 times)
  - HWA Heavyweight Championship (1 time)
  - Brian Pillman Memorial Cruiserweight Tournament (1999)
- Independent Wrestling Association Mid-South
  - IWA Mid-South Light Heavyweight Championship (1 time)
  - IWA Mid-South Television Championship (1 time)
- Main Event World League
  - MEWL Cruiserweight Championship (1 time)
- Midwest Wrestling Association
  - MWA Light Heavyweight Championship (1 time)
- Mid-West Wrestling Connection
  - MWWC Heavyweight Championship (1 time)
- Ohio Championship Wrestling
  - OCW Cruiserweight Championship (1 time)
- New Breed Wrestling Association
  - NBWA Heavyweight Championship (1 time)
- New Era Pro Wrestling
  - NEPW Cruiserweight Championship (1 time)
- Price of Glory Wrestling
  - Glory Cup (2004)
- Pro Wrestling Beyond
  - PWB Heavyweight Championship (2 times)
- Pro Wrestling eXpress
  - PWX Television Championship (2 times)
- Pro Wrestling Illustrated
  - PWI ranked him #157 of the top 500 singles wrestlers in the PWI 500 in 2001
- Provincial Championship Wrestling
  - PCW Heavyweight Championship (1 time)
- Real American Wrestling
  - RAW Cruiserweight Championship (1 time)
- World Classic Professional Big Time Wrestling
  - WCPBTW Ohio State Tag Team Championship (1 time, current) – with Onyx
- Other titles
  - WPL Cruiserweight Championship (1 time)
