= HWA Tag Team Championship =

Professional wrestling tag team championship

Details
- Promotion: Heartland Wrestling Association
- Date established: January 5, 1996
- Current champion: Inactive
- Date won: April 19, 2013
Statistics
- First champion: Head Bangers
- Most reigns: (as team) Southern Breeze (5 times), (as individual) Cody Hawk (10 times)
- Longest reign: The GP Code (466 Days)
- Shortest reign: Deja Vu and Benjamin Kimera (3 days)

The HWA Tag Team Championship is the tag team titles contested for in the Heartland Wrestling Association. It was established in 1996 when the Head Bangers (Mosh and Thrasher) became the first champions.

== Title history ==
Key

No.	Overall reign number
Reign	Reign number for the specific champion

No.	Wrestler:	Times:	Date:	Days Held:	Location:	Notes:
1.	Head Bangers (Mosh and Thrasher)	1	January 5, 1996		Fort Wright, KY	
2.	The Bounty Hunter and Brian Taylor	1	August 22, 1997	397	Harveysburg, OH	Defeated Bobo Brazil, Jr. and Andy Chase in tournament final to win vacant titles.
3.	Chip Fairway and Cody Hawk	1	September 23, 1998	122	Lima, OH	
4.	Brian Taylor^{(2)} and Sean Casey	1	January 23, 1999	35	Hamilton, OH	
5.	Chip Fairway^{(2)} and Cody Hawk^{(2)}	2	February 27, 1999	280	Hamilton, OH	
6.	Alexis Machine and Brian Fury	1	August 25, 1999	77	Blanchester, OH	
7.	Cody Hawk^{(3)} and Mad Anthony McMurphy	1	February 19, 2000	119	Hamilton, OH	
8.	Bobby Casanova and Brian Fury	1	June 17, 2000	112	Hamilton, OH	
9.	The A Squad (Chet Jablonski and Pepper Parks)	1	October 7, 2000	111	Blanchester, OH	
10.	Cody Hawk^{(4)} and Mad Anthony McMurphy^{(2)}	2	January 26, 2001	49	Rising Sun, IN	
11.	The A Squad (Chet Jablonski^{(2)} and Dean Jablonski)	2	March 16, 2001	116	Rising Sun, IN	
12.	Human Time Bomb and Nigel McGuinness	1	July 10, 2001	28	Cincinnati, OH	
13.	The A Squad (Chet Jablonski^{(3)} and Dean Jablonski^{(2)})	3	August 7, 2001	67	Cincinnati, OH	
14.	Evan Karagias and Shannon Moore	1	October 13, 2001	32	Batavia, OH	
15.	The Island Boyz (Ekmo and Kimo)	1	November 14, 2001	24	Dayton, OH	
16.	Steve Bradley and Val Venis	1	December 8, 2001	32	Batavia, OH	
17.	The Island Boyz (Ekmo and Kimo)	2	January 8, 2002	35	Dayton, OH	Won the titles in a six-man tag match teaming with RC Haas against E. Z. Money, Bradley, and Venis with Money also defending the HWA Heavyweight Championship
18.	Lance Cade and Mike Sanders	1	February 13, 2002	7	Dayton, OH	Vacated the titles the same day.
19.	Lance Cade^{(2)} and Steve Bradley^{(2)}	2	February 20, 2002	20	Cincinnati, OH	Cade defeated Sanders in a match with the stipulation that he could choose a new tag team partner.
20.	Hugh Morrus and Raven	1	March 12, 2002	3	Cincinnati, OH	
21.	Lance Cade^{(3)} and Steve Bradley^{(3)}	2	March 15, 2002	26	Dayton, OH	
22.	Cody Hawk^{(4)} and Ice Cream Man	1	April 10, 2002	91	Batavia, OH	
23.	Human Time Bomb and Nigel McGuinness^{(2)}	1	July 23, 2002	13	Cincinnati, OH	
24.	Southern Breeze (Brother Clay and Matt Dillinger)	1				Stripped of title on November 9, 2002
25.	Matt Stryker and Rory Fox	1	December 7, 2002		Batavia, OH	
26.	Chet Jablonski^{(3)} and Cody Hawk^{(5)}	1	March 25, 2003	108	Cincinnati, OH	
27.	D-Lo Brown and Matt Stryker^{(2)}	1	May 23, 2003	59	Dayton, OH	
28.	Chet Jablonski^{(4)} and Cody Hawk^{(6)}	2	May 26, 2003	3	Cincinnati, OH	
29.	JT Stahr and TJ Dalton	1	July 26, 2003	61	Columbus, OH	
30.	Chet Jablonski^{(5)} and Cody Hawk^{(7)}	3				Vacated titles when Jablonski leaves area and Hawk is injured.
31.	The Riggs Brothers (Jason Riggs and Johnny Riggs)	1	November 26, 2003		Wilmington, OH	
32.	JT Stahr^{(2)} and TJ Dalton^{(2)}	2	December 16, 2003		Cincinnati, OH	
33.	Crazy J and Lotus	1	February 6, 2004		Cincinnati, OH	
34.	JT Stahr^{(3)} and TJ Dalton^{(3)}	3	February 10, 2004		Cincinnati, OH	
35.	Cody Hawk^{(8)} and Matt Stryker^{(3)}	1	April 2, 2004		Cincinnati, OH	
36.	Kimera and Shawn Osborne	1	June 15, 2004		Cincinnati, OH	
37.	Crazy J^{(2)} and Lotus^{(2)}	2	August 17, 2004		Cincinnati, OH	
38.	Foreign Intelligence (Quinten Lee and Ala Hussein)	1	October 5, 2004		Cincinnati, OH	
39.	Cody Hawk^{(9)} and Matt Stryker^{(3)}	2	October 26, 2004		Cincinnati, OH	Stripped of title on December 17, 2004.
40.	Mike Desire and Tack	1	December 17, 2004		Cincinnati, OH	
41.	Necessary Roughness (Jimmy Turner and Jon Moxley)	1	March 11, 2005		Cincinnati, OH	
42.	Foreign Intelligence (Quinten Lee^{(2)} and Ala Hussein^{(2)})	2	May 13, 2005		Cincinnati, OH	
43.	Heartland Foundation (Ric Byrne and Jon Moxley^{(2)})	1	August 19, 2005		Cincinnati, OH	Stripped of title on August 19, 2005.
44.	Foreign Intelligence (Quinten Lee^{(3)} and Ala Hussein^{(3)})	3	August 19, 2005		Cincinnati, OH	Awarded titles by Brock Guffman.
45.	Matt Stryker^{(4)} and Tack	1	October 25, 2005		Cincinnati, OH	
46.	Brian Jennings and Kimera^{(2)}	1	December 13, 2005		Cincinnati, OH	
47.	Foreign Intelligence (Quinten Lee^{(4)} and Ala Hussein^{(4)})	4	February 21, 2006		Cincinnati, OH	
48.	The Mavericks (Aaron Williams and Alan Wasylychyn)	1	July 11, 2006		Cincinnati, OH	
49.	The Irish Airborne (Dave Crist and Jake Crist)	3	October 20, 2006		Cincinnati, OH	
50.	Tack^{(2)} and Tarek the Legend	1	March 10, 2007		Cincinnati, OH	
51.	Cody Hawk^{(10)} and Jon Moxley^{(3)}	1	June 12, 2007		Cincinnati, OH	
52.	G.P. Code (Andre Heart and Richard Phillips)	1	June 16, 2007		Cincinnati, OH	
53.	The Entourage (JT Stahr^{(3)}, The Madness, V-Rad)	1	September 24, 2008		Middletown, OH	
54.	Deja Vu and Benjamin Kimera^{(3)}	1	November 19, 2008		Middletown, OH	
55.	The Entourage (JT Stahr^{(4)}, The Madness^{(2)}, V-Rad^{(2)})	2	November 22, 2008	54	Middletown, OH	
56.	G.P. Code^{(2)} and Benjamin Kimera^{(4)}	1	December 19, 2008	59	Middletown, OH	
57.	The Hybrids (Donovan Cain and Jason Lyte)	1	February 11, 2009	7	Middletown, OH	
58.	G.P. Code (Andre Heart^{(2)} and Richard Phillips^{(2)})	2	April 11, 2009	7	Peoria, IL	
59.	The Hybrids (Donovan Cain^{(2)} and Jason Lyte^{(2)})	2	April 18, 2009	19	Norwood, OH	
60.	The Kosher Klub (Joseph Schwartz and Sean Tylerstein)	1	September 26, 2009	161	Norwood, OH	
61.	Royal Violence (King Vu^{(3)})& Jon Moxley^{(4)})	1	October 14, 2009	48	Middletown, OH	
62.	The Irish Airborne (Dave Crist and Jake Crist)	4	December 2, 2009	17	Middletown, OH	
63.	Royal Violence (King Vu^{(4)})& Jon Moxley^{(5)})	2	December 19, 2009	25	Norwood, OH	
64.	The Irish Airborne (Dave Crist and Jake Crist)	5	January 13, 2010	42	Middletown, OH	
65.	Noble Bloods (Lord Matthew Taylor and Sir Chadwick Cruise)	1	February 24, 2010	94	Middletown, OH	
66.	The Flying Mendoza Brothers (Loco and Loto Mendoza)	6	May 29, 2010	39	Norwood, OH	
	Vacant		July 7, 2010		Middletown, OH	Vacated after the Flying Mendoza Brothers were suddenly deported over work visa problems.
67.	The Noble Bloods (Lord Matthew Taylor and Sir Chadwick Cruise)	2	August 20, 2010	120	Norwood, OH	Survived a four team elimination match which included The Hybrids, The Irish Airborne, and The Heatseekers.
68.	The Heatseekers (Kaden Assad and Jeremy Madrox)	1	December 18, 2010	210	Norwood, OH	Won a Triple-Treat match which included The Hybrids and The Noble Bloods. The match was for the OCW Tag-Team Championship, HWA Tag-Team Championship, and the future of The Hybrids as a tag-team.
69.	DNA (Doug Charlez and Aaron Xtreme)	1	July 16, 2011	43	Hamilton, OH	Won a Tag-Team Gauntlet which included The Noble Bloods, The Heatseekers, and Jon Murray and Clark Konner.
70.	The Heatseekers (Kaden Assad and Jeremy Madrox)	2	August 27, 2011	62	Norwood, OH	Awarded the titles after DNA was forced to relinquish them after Xtreme was put out because of an injury.
71.	The Noble Bloods (Lord Matthew Taylor and Sir Chadwick Cruise)	3	October 29, 2011	49	Norwood, OH	Survived a No-Disqualification Match against The Heatseekers.
72.	American Wrestling Warriors (Troy Marcum and Jeff Mayhem)	1	December 17, 2011	52	Hamilton, OH	Won a Tag-Team Elimination match which included The Noble Bloods, The Heatseekers, and DNA.
73.	DNA (Doug Charlez and Aaron Xtreme)	2	February 7, 2012	18	Hamilton, OH	
74.	American Wrestling Warriors (Troy Marcum and Jeff Mayhem)	2	February 25, 2012	38	Hamilton, OH	
75.	Heavyweight Heroes (Jon Murray and Clark Konnor)	1	April 3, 2012	21	Hamilton, OH	
76.	Jesse Emerson and Chris Hall^{(3)}	1	April 24, 2012	126	Hamilton, OH	
	Vacant^{(3)}		April 19, 2013		Middletown, OH	HWA's New Management decides to strip Jesse Emerson and Chris Hall and make the titles inactive until further notice.

== See also ==
- Heartland Wrestling Association
