= Steve Bradley =

American professional wrestler (1975–2008)

Personal information
- Born: Steven James Bisson; December 10, 1975 Boston, Massachusetts, U.S.
- Died: December 4, 2008 (aged 32) Manchester, New Hampshire, U.S.

Professional wrestling career
- Ring name: Steve Bradley
- Billed height: 6 ft 2 in (1.88 m)
- Billed weight: 245 lb (111 kg)
- Trained by: Les Thatcher; Tom Prichard
- Debut: 1991
- Retired: 2005

Steven James Bisson (December 10, 1975 – December 4, 2008) was an American professional wrestler who wrestled under the ring name Steve Bradley. He competed in various North American independent promotions as well as spending over three years in World Wrestling Entertainment developmental territories including Power Pro Wrestling, Heartland Wrestling Association, Memphis Championship Wrestling and Ohio Valley Wrestling.

He was also the owner and head trainer at Wrestling Federation of America (WFA), a New Hampshire based independent promotion. Notable graduates include Alex Arion, Antonio Thomas, Brandon Locke, Brian Fury, Matt Spectro, Scott Reed, Nicole Raczynski and Max Smashmaster.

== Biography ==
=== Early career and Power Pro Wrestling ===
At the age of 15, Bradley made his professional debut in 1991 becoming a mainstay of various East Coast promotions during the 1990s. He wrestled for a taping for WWF Superstars of Wrestling where he teamed with Joe DeLeon losing to The Bodydonnas on April 2, 1996. In 1998, Bradley signed a 3-year developmental contract with the World Wrestling Federation and began training under Tom Prichard at WWF Headquarters in Stamford, Connecticut, with Kurt Angle.

Assigned to Memphis-based Power Pro Wrestling, both he and Angle began feuding with each other over the PPW Heavyweight title eventually defeating Angle for the title on August 7, 1999 and becoming the first man to pin Angle in his professional career. Their feud would be voted "Underrated Feud of the Year" by Pro Wrestling Illustrated that same year.

In March 1999, he won the third annual ECWA Super 8 Tournament defeating Ace Darling and Devon Storm, before beating Christopher Daniels in the finals.

He later feuded with Vic Grimes, defeating him for the PPW Young Guns Championship on July 19. He lost the PPW Heavyweight title to Grimes on September 18 before regaining it a week later on September 25, 1999.

=== World Wrestling Federation ===
After the WWF ended their developmental agreement with Power Pro Wrestling, Bradley was brought into IWA Puerto Rico where he feuded with Savio Vega and won the IWA World Tag Team Championship twice with Andy Anderson as Club WWF.

He was eventually assigned to Memphis Championship Wrestling, a new developmental territory, in early 2001 and began wrestling with Essa Ríos and Lita on WWF house shows and dark matches on television tapings throughout the United States. He appeared at WrestleMania X-Seven to take part in WrestleMania Axxess. He also participated in a spot at Wrestlemania X-Seven as a golf cart driver thrown from his cart.

Spending the next two years in Ohio Valley Wrestling and the Heartland Wrestling Association, Bradley would win the HWA Tag Team Championship three times with Val Venis and Lance Cade. and eventually became involved in booking for the promotion before being released from his developmental contract in July 2002.

=== Later career ===
After WWF, he worked in the independent circuit in New England for New England Championship Wrestling and the Wrestling Federation of America where he worked until his last match in 2005. He also operated the Top Rope Wrestling Academy, a wrestling school based in Manchester, New Hampshire.

== Death and legacy ==
Bradley was found dead on December 4, 2008, in a parking lot across the street from where he once operated a pro wrestling school in Manchester, New Hampshire. Bradley's cause of death was not determined. In trying to determine whether drugs could have played a factor in his death, autopsy results were inconclusive. Bradley was indicted on possession of heroin charges only a month before his death. Police do not believe any foul play was involved, however.

In 2017, Bradley was mentioned by Kurt Angle in his WWE Hall of Fame speech, and thanked him for being an "unsung hero".

== Championships and accomplishments ==
- East Coast Wrestling Association
  - Super 8 Tournament (1999)
- Heartland Wrestling Association
  - HWA Tag Team Championship (4 times) - with Sean Morley (1) Lance Cade (3)
- International Wrestling Association
  - IWA World Tag Team Championship (2 times) - with Andy Anderson
- Memphis Championship Wrestling
  - MCW Southern Heavyweight Championship (2 times)
- New England Pro Wrestling Hall of Fame
  - Class of 2009
- Power Pro Wrestling
  - PPW Heavyweight Championship (4 times)
  - PPW Young Guns Championship (2 times)
- Pro Wrestling Illustrated
  - Ranked him No. 83 of the 500 best singles wrestlers in the PWI 500 in 2002
- PWF Northeast Wrestling
  - Mentor of the Mayhem (2013)
- Yankee Pro Wrestling
  - YPW Interstate Championship (1 time)

== See also ==
- List of premature professional wrestling deaths
- List of unsolved deaths
