= D'Lo Brown =

American professional wrestler (born 1973)

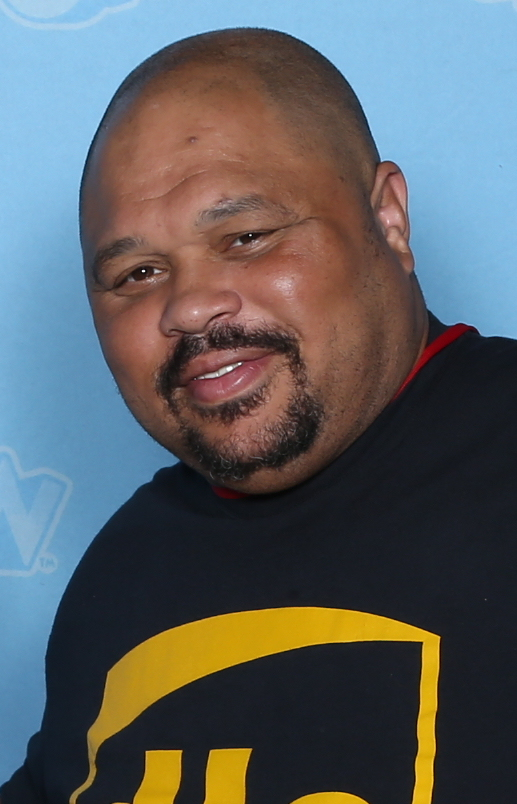
- Brown in 2019

Personal information
- Born: Accie Julius Connor; October 22, 1973 (age 52) Burlington, New Jersey, U.S.
- Education: University of Maine
- Spouse: Jennifer Connor (m. 2001)
- Children: 2

Professional wrestling career
- Ring name(s): A.C. Corner; A.C. Connor; Ace the Animal; Ace Brown; D'Lo Brown
- Billed height: 6 ft 3 in (191 cm)
- Billed weight: 268 lb (122 kg)
- Billed from: Chicago, Illinois
- Trained by: Al Snow; Larry Sharpe
- Debut: 1994

Accie Julius Connor (born October 22, 1973), better known by his ring name D'Lo Brown (also formatted as D-Lo Brown), is an American professional wrestler. He is signed to Total Nonstop Action Wrestling (TNA), where he works as a producer. He is best known for his time with WWE. Brown is also known for his appearances in Ring of Honor (ROH), All Japan Pro Wrestling (AJPW), Irish Whip Wrestling (IWW) and Pro Wrestling Noah.

== Professional wrestling career ==
=== Smoky Mountain and early career (1994–1997) ===
Connor began his wrestling career in New Jersey as "Ace the Animal". He then wrestled Earthquake in the World Wrestling Federation (WWF) in 1994 under his given name as a jobber.

Connor debuted in Smoky Mountain Wrestling in September 1994 as "A.C. Conner". In October 1994, he was renamed "'Downtown' D'Lo Brown" and introduced as the head of security for the Gangstas (Mustapha Saed and New Jack). Brown was the worker of the stable, complementing Saed's size and Jack's animated personality. He regularly wrestled on Smoky Mountain Wrestling's television show, unsuccessfully challenged for the SMW Beat the Champ Television Championship on several occasions. At Sunday Bloody Sunday II in February 1995, the Gangstas lost to the Heavenly Bodies and Jim Cornette. At Bluegrass Brawl III in April 1995, the Gangstas lost to Tracy Smothers and The Undertaker in a handicap match. Brown wrestled his final match for Smoky Mountain Wrestling in October 1995.

After leaving Smoky Mountain Wrestling, Brown signed a deal with the WWF and was sent to the Heartland Wrestling Association for more training while also making appearances as a jobber on WWF television. Brown also spent most of 1996 wrestling in Puerto Rico for the World Wrestling Council.

=== World Wrestling Federation / World Wrestling Entertainment (1997–2003) ===
==== Nation of Domination (1997–1998) ====
In April 1997, Brown was reintroduced to the World Wrestling Federation (WWF) as a member of Faarooq's heel Nation of Domination stable, debuting as one of several non-descript people in suits that accompanied the group to the ring. During this time, his most notable moment was when Ahmed Johnson slammed him onto the roof of a car during Shotgun Saturday Night. His first televised match as a member of the Nation was on the April 26, 1997, episode of Shotgun Saturday Night, as he, Crush, and Savio Vega defeated Aldo Montoya, Steve Corino, and Freddie Joe Floyd. On May 26, 1997, he had his first match on Raw is War, defeating Bob "Spark Plugg" Holly. After the King of the Ring 1997, Faarooq fired the rest of the Nation's members, except for D-Lo, who was later joined by Ahmed Johnson (later replaced by Rocky Maivia), Kama Mustafa, and Mark Henry.

In early 1998, the Nation of Domination turned on Faarooq, allowing Maivia, now going by the name "The Rock", to assume leadership. During this period Kama also changed his name to "The Godfather" and began portraying a pimp character. Brown and Henry eventually turned on both Rock and Godfather separately, moving into a feud with the Rock before finally branching out as a moderately successful tag team, later turning face along the way. Prior to the face turn, Brown had started wrestling with a chest protector, supposedly for a torn pectoral muscle sustained in a match against Dan "The Beast" Severn. Instead, he used the chest protector to his advantage, making his finishing move, the Lo Down, more effective.

==== Title pursuit (1998–2000) ====
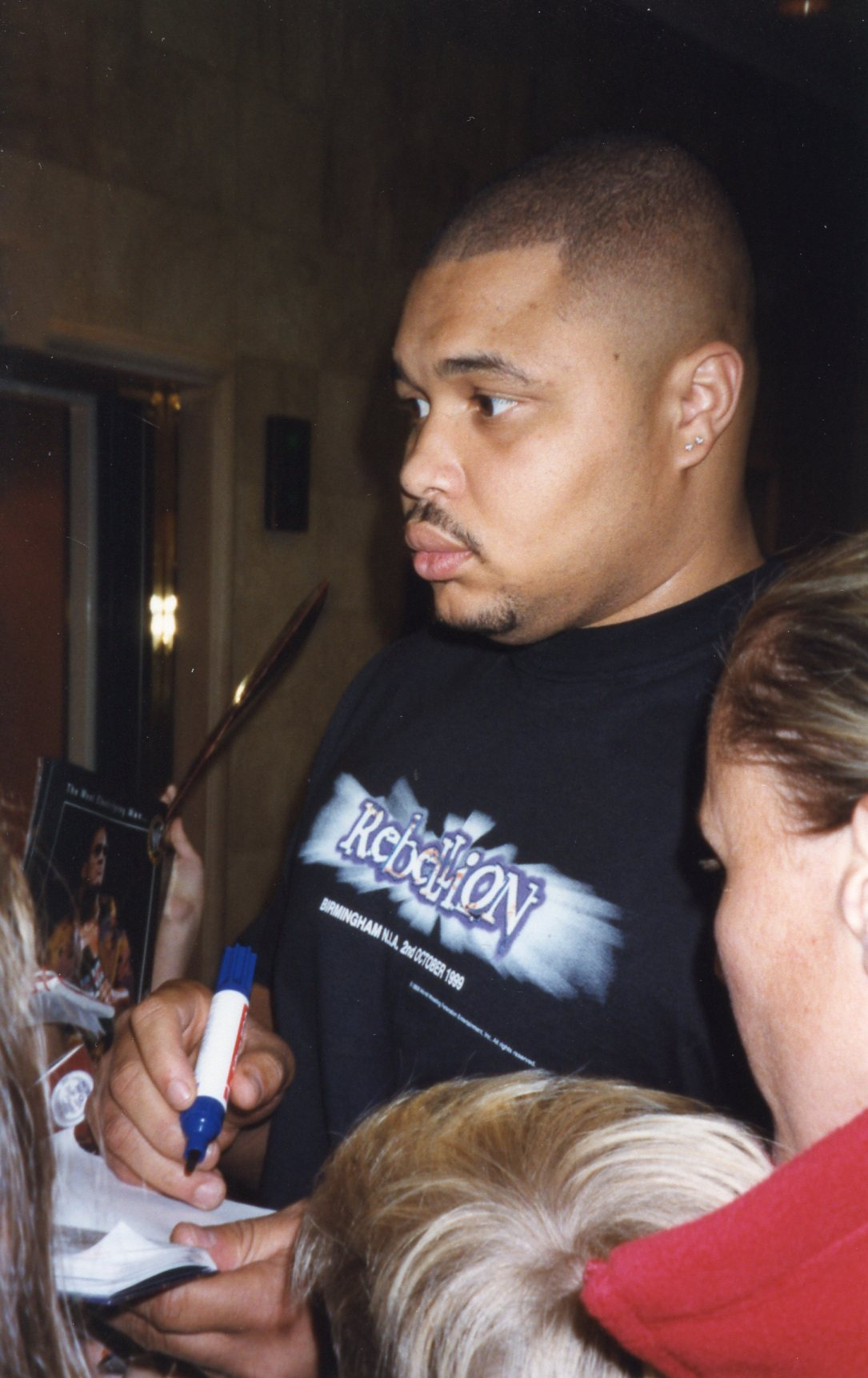
Brown in the late 1990s

In 1998, he feuded with X-Pac over the WWF European Championship. His career peaked when he held the European and Intercontinental Championships simultaneously during a feud with Jeff Jarrett and Mark Henry. This feat has only been duplicated by Jeff Jarrett, Kurt Angle, and Rob Van Dam, all of whom became world champions in some form, later in their careers.

Brown was involved in inadvertently ending the career of Droz on October 5, 1999, when a running powerbomb was botched due to Droz's baggy shirt. The match was filmed for the October 7 edition of SmackDown!, but was never aired. Droz suffered a severe neck injury, rendering him a quadriplegic. During an interview with Title Match Wrestling, Brown dispelled a popular rumor that a fan had thrown an object into the ring which caused him to slip and badly injure Darren Drozdov. Brown took responsibility for botching the move, stating that the accident could have happened to "any" wrestler he had been in the ring with that night. He also said the accident caused him to "wrestle differently" and to second guess every move he performed in the ring from that day forward. Drozdov maintained that he did not blame Brown for his injuries and believed the incident was an accident.

During the rest of the year and into some of the next, Brown became an ally of former fellow Nation member The Godfather, emulating his dress and walking motions. The teaming ended when Brown turned heel on the Godfather.

==== Lo Down (2000–2001) ====
Brown then formed a tag team in July 2000 with Chaz named Lo Down. The team mostly wrestled on Sunday Night Heat and WWE Jakked / Metal. Shortly after the team formed, Tiger Ali Singh joined the team to become their manager. The tag team then came dressed towards the ring in Sikh attire and took on a gimmick very similar to Tiger's. The team was removed from WWF television in January 2001 after Singh was injured. According to Brown, it was the lowest point in his career. Brown also spent six months in Puerto Rico wrestling for the International Wrestling Association teaming with Chaz. He later teamed with Glamour Boy Shane holding the IWA tag team titles.

==== OVW and Heartland (2001–2002) ====
Chaz and Singh were later released by WWF that year, Brown stayed in WWE's developmental territory, OVW. Notably, Brown wrestled future World champion Batista in a losing effort. He also worked for Heartland Wrestling Association going into 2002.

==== Alliance with Theodore Long (2002–2003) ====
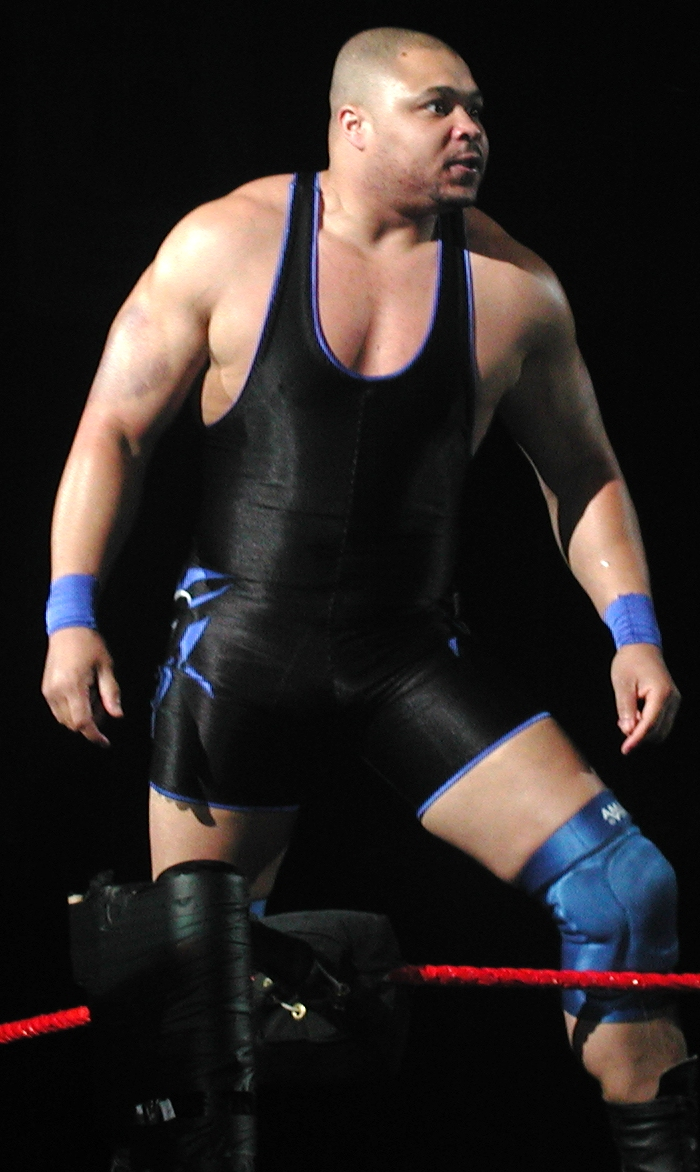
Brown in September 2002

Brown returned to television on the April 28, 2002, episode of Heat, losing to Eddie Guerrero. For the rest of the year, Brown mostly wrestled on Heat, did a little bit of commentary on the show, and even started a brief feud with Raven. In late 2002, Theodore Long retired as a WWE referee and managed D'Lo, who had complained about acts of racism during his matches. D'Lo started Long's group Thuggin' and Buggin' Enterprises which eventually turned into a group of African Americans who worked an angle in which they felt they were victims of racism and were being held down by the "white man". With Long's managerial services, D'Lo Brown went undefeated for several weeks.

Brown faced Booker T in a losing effort on the February 10, 2003, episode of Raw. His involvement with Thuggin' and Buggin' Enterprises was brought to a close when footage was shown on the February 16 episode (taped February 10) of Heat of Theodore Long kicking D'Lo Brown to the curb and introducing his replacement Rodney Mack. He was then released from his WWE contract on February 14, 2003.

=== NWA Total Nonstop Action (2003–2004) ===
Connor, still under the D'Lo Brown name, Joined NWA Total Nonstop Action in March 2003. During his time in TNA, he teamed with AJ Styles on many occasions together even challenging for the NWA World Tag Team Championships but were unsuccessful. After the team split up Brown challenged Styles for the NWA World Heavyweight Championship but came up short on every occasion doing a best of 3 series.

On the March 19, 2003, edition of NWA-TNA, Brown teamed with Dusty Rhodes and Jeff Jarrett defeating Erik Watts, Brian Lawler and David Flair. On April 2, 2003, edition of NWA-TNA weekly pay-per view D'Lo Brown unsuccessfully challenged Jeff Jarrett for the NWA World Heavyweight Championship. On April 14, 2004, Brown and Gran Apolo won the NWA World Tag Team Championships defeating Kid Kash and Dallas, They lost the titles just seven days after winning them. D'Lo later left TNA in the summer of 2004.

On a September 2014 interview, Brown said there was a time in TNA during this time where the creative team wanted to radically change his character; on top of not feeling like he was a good fit with TNA, Brown felt that by wrestling in Japan, he could still wrestle there while being D'Lo Brown.

=== All Japan Pro Wrestling and overseas (2004–2009) ===
Brown Joined All Japan Pro Wrestling, competing in regular tours with the Japanese company as a member of Roughly Obsess and Destroy (RO&D). During one of these tours on September 17, 2006, Brown betrayed RO&D to join the rival Voodoo Murders faction. Brown left All Japan in 2007 and rejoined RO&D in Pro Wrestling Noah.

When not in Japan, Brown was regularly found touring the United Kingdom, as well as working for Irish Whip Wrestling in Ireland. In April 2005, Brown became one of the lead trainers of the ill-fated Celebrity Wrestling on ITV. This Saturday evening reality show saw celebrities learn wrestling and compete in challenge matches. After a few weeks the programme was to be canceled, but was instead moved to Sunday mornings to finish its final episodes. During his time wrestling in England, he would face off in a series of matches against his Celebrity Wrestling opposition's trainer, Joe Legend.

=== Return to WWE (2008–2009) ===
In 2008, Brown began wrestling in a number of dark matches for WWE. On June 5, WWE announced that Brown had been signed to a contract, and he began working more dark matches for the company. He made his television return on the July 21, 2008, edition of Raw, defeating Santino Marella. Following this, Brown's appearances on television became more sporadic, and on January 9, 2009, it was announced on WWE's website that he had been released from his WWE contract due to cost-cutting measures.

=== Independent circuit (2009–2010) ===
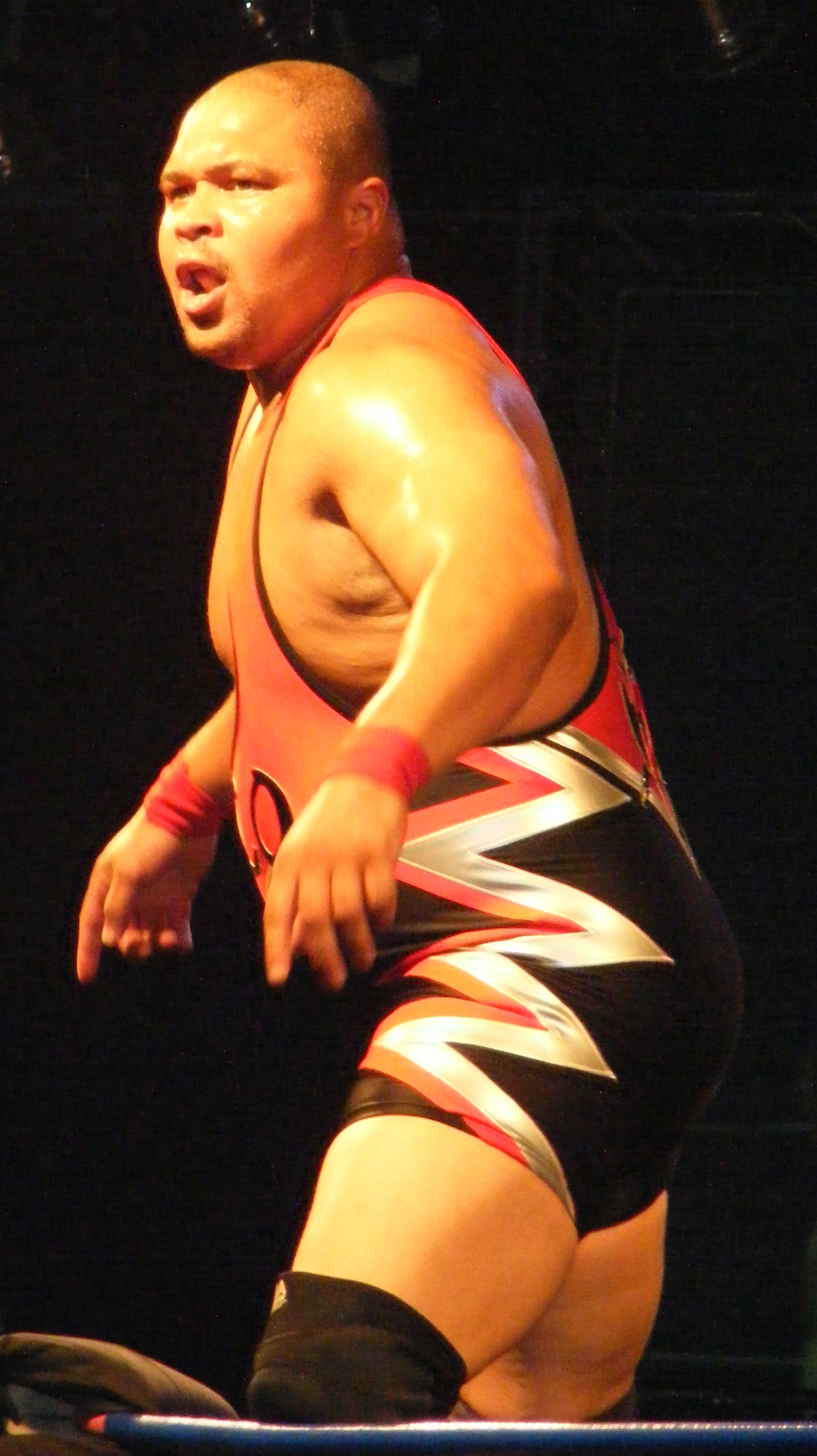
Brown in 2009

Brown debuted for Ring of Honor during Proving Ground 09 weekend in February. He was defeated by Nigel McGuinness in an ROH World Championship match. He also wrestled at the ROH 7th Anniversary Show on March 21, 2009, in Manhattan, defeating Jay Briscoe. Brown also appeared on Ring of Honor Wrestling on HDNet. Varsity Pro Wrestling also announced that Brown would be making his third appearance for the promotion on their February tour. Brown also made a surprise appearance in Chikara, where he filled in as a substitute for Iceberg of The Cold Front at the 2009 King of Trios tournament. Brown came up short in an ROH World Championship match at Take No Prisoners (2009). At ROH's Manhattan Mayhem III on June 13, Brown tapped out to Colt Cabana in a four-way match also involving Bryan Danielson and Claudio Castagnoli. On June 27 on an ROH show he was defeated by Cabana.

Throughout April and May 2009, Brown flew to Japan to take part in the 13-night Pro Wrestling Noah Global Tag League with his partner Buchanan. During the course of the event they won and lost three matches with one contest went to a draw giving them seven points placing them sixth of the eight teams. Outside of the tournament Brown was undefeated in six-man tag team competition, adding Keith Walker to the team, including a victory over Noah founder Mitsuharu Misawa in one of his last matches.

On the September 15, 2009, edition of Between The Ropes, Brown announced that after his current tour with Ring of Honor, he would retire from in-ring action. Also, on this edition of Between The Ropes, Brown announced he would become a semi-regular co-host when his TNA scheduling allowed him to be in studio.

He defeated Mr. Anderson on June 12, 2010, TCW event in Pine Bluff, Arkansas. He did not wrestle again until 2013.

=== Return to TNA (2009–2013) ===
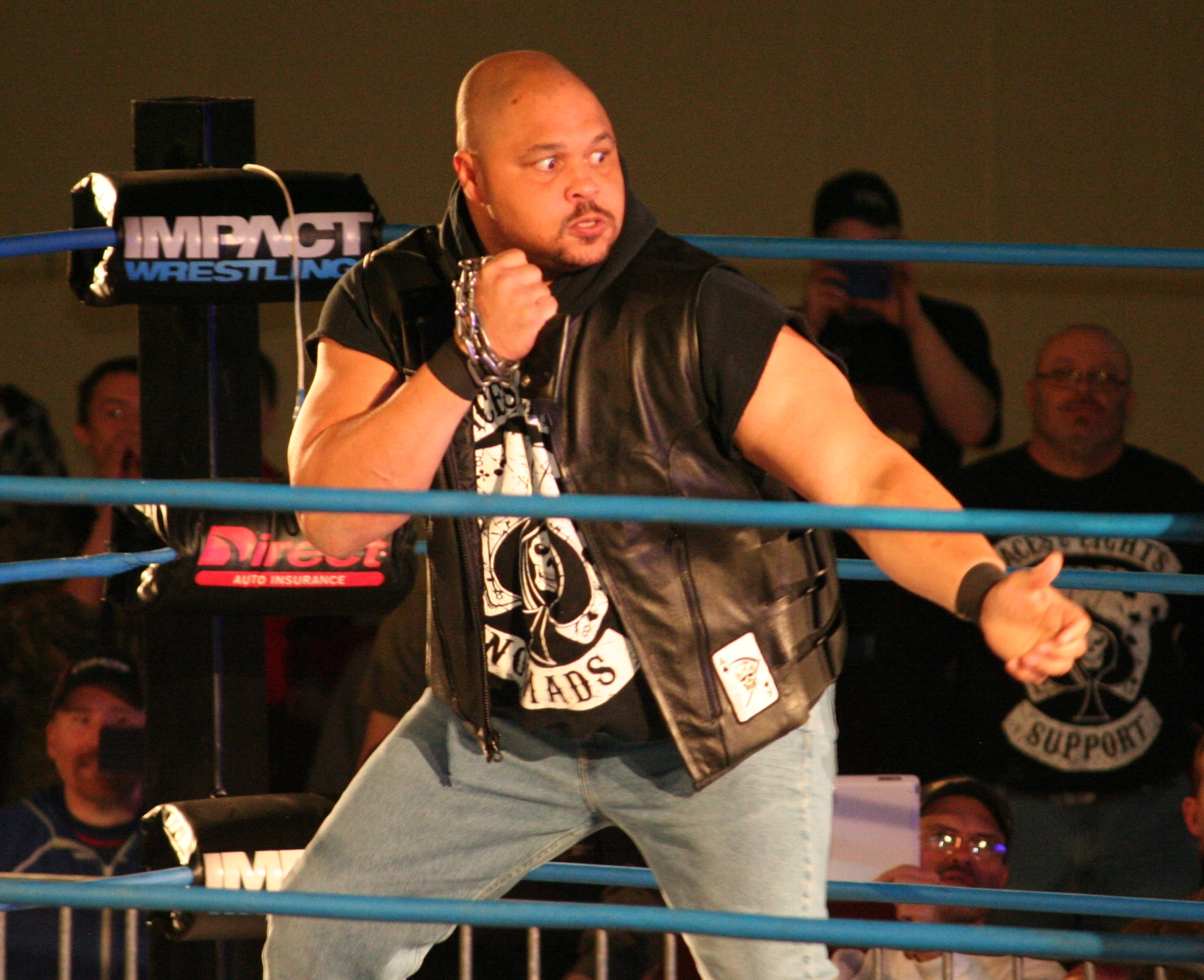
D'Lo Brown as a member of Aces & Eights

In September 2009, Connor was re-signed by TNA as their lead agent. Additionally, D'Lo was in charge of talent development and acquisitions heading up the TNA Gut Check program.

On the March 7, 2013, episode of Impact Wrestling, Brown attacked Kurt Angle and revealed himself as the Vice President of Aces & Eights, turning heel in the process. Three days later at Lockdown, Brown interfered in Angle's steel cage match against fellow Aces & Eights member Wes Brisco, costing Angle the match. Later that evening, the President of the Aces & Eights was revealed to be Bully Ray. Brown wrestled his first televised match in four years on the May 2 episode of Impact Wrestling, losing to Kurt Angle in an I Quit Match. As a result of his loss, Brown was demoted to a prospect the following week. On July 17, Brown announced he was released from his TNA contract.

=== Return to AJPW (2013) ===
On August 11, 2013, All Japan Pro Wrestling announced that Brown would be returning to the promotion the following month to take part in the 2013 Ōdō Tournament. Brown returned to the promotion on September 11 in a non-tournament tag team match, where he and Bambi Killer defeated Burning (Atsushi Aoki and Yoshinobu Kanemaru), with Brown pinning Kanemaru for the win. Three days later, Brown was eliminated by Kanemaru in his first round match in the Ōdō Tournament. For the rest of the tour, which lasted until September 23, Brown worked midcard tag team matches, suffering pinfall losses in most of them. On October 3, Brown was announced also for All Japan's next tour, which started October 12. Brown continued teaming regularly with Bambi Killer, which eventually led to the two forming a heel stable named DK (Dark Kingdom) under the leadership of Kenso on November 21.

=== Return to Independent circuit (2013–2023) ===
After working for TNA, Brown returned to the independent circuit where he appeared for Pro Wrestling Syndicate on May 18, 2013, with D.O.C. and Knux. On August 3, 2013, Brown and Hankinson lost to the Rock 'n' Roll Express at Mid-Atlantic Wrestling Legends Fanfest. By the end of the year he worked in England and the Netherlands.

On November 22, 2014, Brown would team with former WWE wrestler Bull Buchanan defeating AJ Steele and Brad Lynch at Buchanan's retirement show at UIW in Bowden, Georgia.

He lost to Sabu at XICW Bodyslams Childhood Cancer event in Wyandotte, Michigan, on July 29, 2017. On October 27, 2018, he won the vacated HLW Legends Title defeating Dru Skillz in Fort Wayne, Indiana. He dropped the title to Tracy Smothers on April 20, 2019.

Brown's last match was on October 7, 2023, for Border City Wrestling in which he along with Scott D'Amore and Tommy Dreamer defeated the team of Johnny Swinger, N8 Mattson and Tyler Tirva.

=== Future Stars of Wrestling (2014–2015) ===
Brown formerly held a weekly class on Friday for "Future Stars of Wrestling" training center in Las Vegas.

=== Second return to Impact / Total Nonstop Action Wrestling (2019–present) ===
On July 3, 2019, Brown announced that he had returned to Impact Wrestling with a multi-year contract as a producer. Brown and Mr Anderson were scheduled to represent the Aces & Eights at TNA: There's No Place Like Home but the event was annulled due to the COVID-19 pandemic.

In January 2021, it was announced that Brown would be one half of Impact's new announce team with Matt Striker from Hard to Kill onward. The role ended in early 2022 when Honor No More attacked him. His role was replaced by Matt Rehwoldt.

Brown returned as part of the reunited Aces & Eights, managing Garett Bischoff and Wes Brisco, in a losing effort against Honor No More's Kenny King and Vincent. The reunion would later be a one-off, as Brown continued to his Talent Relations role backstage and makes occasional appearances thereafter.

== Personal life ==
Connor holds an accounting degree from the University of Maine. He also played for the football team while attending university. He worked as a Certified Public Accountant (CPA) before he began his wrestling career. He and his wife Jennifer were married in 2001 and have two daughters. He has three half siblings on his dad's side. He is a fan of the Chicago Bears and Liverpool F.C.

== Championships and accomplishments ==
- Backed Against The Wall Championship Wrestling
  - BAW Championship (1 time, inaugural)
  - BAW Title Tournament (2007)
- Border City Wrestling
  - BCW Can-Am Heavyweight Championship (2 times)
- Cleveland All-Pro Wrestling
  - CAPW North American Championship (2 times)
- Great Lakes Wrestling
  - GLW Heavyweight Championship (1 time, inaugural)
  - GLW Heavyweight Title Tournament (1996)
- Heartland Wrestling Association
  - HWA Heavyweight Championship (2 times, inaugural)
  - HWA Tag Team Championship (1 time) – with Matt Stryker
  - HWA Heavyweight Championship Tournament (1996)
- Heroes and Legends Wrestling
  - HLW Legends Championship (1 time)
- International Wrestling Association
  - IWA World Tag Team Championship (1 time) – with Glamour Boy Shane
- International Wrestling Promotions
  - IWP Heavyweight Championship (1 time)
- Irish Whip Wrestling
  - IWW International Heavyweight Championship (1 time)
- Maximum Pro Wrestling
  - MXPW Heavyweight Championship (1 time, final)
- New Era Pro Wrestling
  - NEPW Heavyweight Championship (6 times)
- Pro Wrestling Illustrated
  - Ranked #61 of the top 500 singles wrestlers in the PWI 500 in 2004
  - Ranked #361 of the 500 best singles wrestlers of the PWI Years in 2003
- Pro Wrestling Noah
  - GHC Tag Team Championship (1 time) – with Buchanan
  - GHC Tag Team Title Decision Tournament (2007) – with Buchanan
  - Global Tag League Technique Prize (2008, 2009) – with Buchanan
- Southern Championship Wrestling
  - SCW Florida Southern Heavyweight Championship (1 time)
- Total Nonstop Action Wrestling
  - NWA World Tag Team Championship (1 time) – with Apolo
- USA Xtreme Wrestling
  - UXW Heavyweight Championship (1 time)
- World Wrestling Federation
  - WWF European Championship (4 times)
  - WWF Intercontinental Championship (1 time)
- Wrestling Observer Newsletter
  - Worst Gimmick (2013) Aces & Eights
