= Royal Rumble (1994) =

World Wrestling Federation pay-per-view event

- Promotional poster featuring various WWF wrestlers
- Promotion: World Wrestling Federation
- Date: January 22, 1994
- City: Providence, Rhode Island
- Venue: Providence Civic Center
- Attendance: 14,500
- Buy rate: 200,000
- Tagline: 30 Participants… In Your Living Room!

Pay-per-view chronology
← Previous; Survivor Series	Next → WrestleMania X

Royal Rumble chronology
← Previous; 1993	Next → 1995

The 1994 Royal Rumble was a professional wrestling pay-per-view (PPV) event produced by the World Wrestling Federation (WWF, renamed WWE in 2002). It was the seventh annual Royal Rumble event and took place on Saturday, January 22, 1994, at the Providence Civic Center in Providence, Rhode Island. This was the second Royal Rumble held on a Saturday, after 1991, as well as the last on a Saturday until the 2022 event.

The event was based around the men's Royal Rumble match, a modified 30-man battle royal in which the participants enter at timed intervals instead of all beginning in the ring at the same time. For the 1993 event, the Royal Rumble match winner received a WWF Championship match at that year's WrestleMania. The 1994 Royal Rumble match also awarded the winner the same prize, which was a WWF Championship match at WrestleMania X, thus becoming the tradition for the annual Royal Rumble match.

Six matches were contested at the event, including one dark match. The main event was the 1994 Royal Rumble match. Lex Luger and Bret Hart were named co-winners after simultaneously eliminating each other. The undercard saw Yokozuna defeat The Undertaker in a Casket match to retain the WWF Championship, The Quebecers (Jacques and Pierre) defeated Bret Hart and Owen Hart to retain the WWF Tag Team Championship, and Razor Ramon defeated Irwin R. Schyster to retain the Intercontinental Championship.

== Production ==
=== Background ===
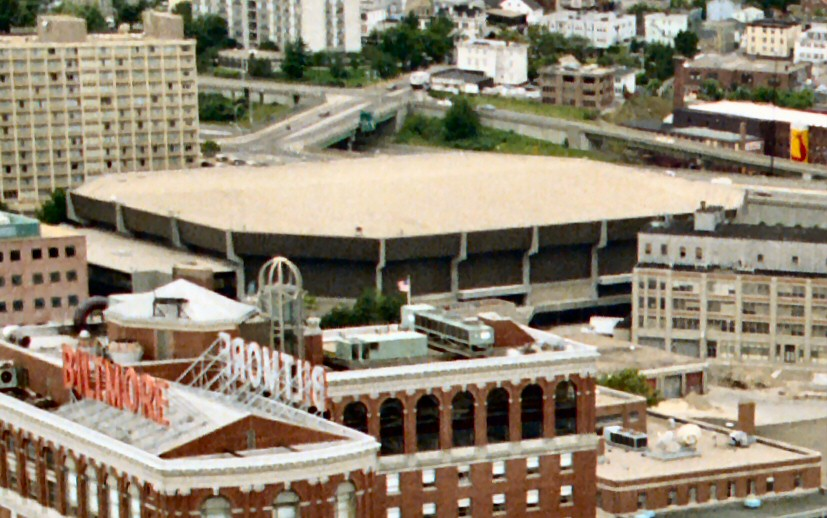
The seventh annual Royal Rumble event was held at the Providence Civic Center in Providence, Rhode Island.

The Royal Rumble is an annual professional wrestling event, produced every January by the World Wrestling Federation (WWF, renamed WWE in 2002) since 1988; that first event was a television special before it became an annual pay-per-view (PPV) beginning in 1989. It is one of the promotion's original four PPVs, along with WrestleMania, SummerSlam, and Survivor Series, referred to as the "Big Four", and one of the "Big Five", along with King of the Ring that was established in 1993. It is named after and centered on the men's Royal Rumble match. The seventh Royal Rumble event was scheduled to be held on Saturday, January 22, 1994, at the Providence Civic Center in Providence, Rhode Island, which was the second Royal Rumble held on a Saturday, after the 1991 event.

The Royal Rumble match is a modified battle royal in which the participants enter at timed intervals instead of all beginning in the ring at the same time, and the match generally features 30 wrestlers. Not including the non-televised test match in 1987, prior to 1992, there was no prize for winning the match. At the 1992 event, as the WWF Championship had been vacated prior to the event, the prize for the 1992 Royal Rumble match was the vacant title. At the 1993 event, it was decided that the winner would be awarded a match for the championship at WrestleMania IX. For 1994, the winner again earned a match for the WWF Championship, which was for WrestleMania X, thus establishing a tradition of the Rumble winner earning a world championship match at WrestleMania.

=== Storylines ===
The first televised match of the pay-per-view was supposed to be Ludvig Borga vs. Tatanka. The two were engaged in a feud that began prior to Survivor Series 1993. Tatanka had been undefeated in the WWF since his debut in 1991. Borga ended this streak on the October 30, 1993, episode of Superstars of Wrestling (taped on September 28, 1993), when he hit Tatanka with a steel chair while the referee was distracted. As a results of storyline injuries from this attack and the beating he suffered afterward at the hands of Borga and Yokozuna, Tatanka was forced to miss the main event match at Survivor Series. Although Tatanka defeated Borga by disqualification on the December 20, 1993, episode of Raw, the bitterness between the two remained.

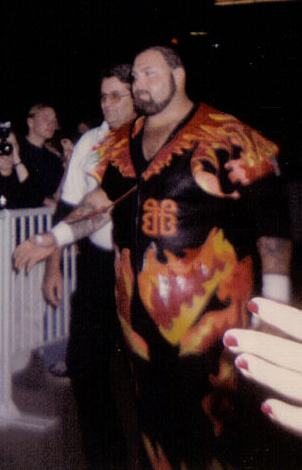
Bam Bam Bigelow replaced Ludvig Borga in a match against Tatanka.

Borga suffered a legit ankle injury, however, and was replaced by Bam Bam Bigelow. Although the substitution took place shortly before the event, Bigelow and Tatanka also had a heated rivalry. In 1993, Bigelow had cut Tatanka's dyed red hair as an insult to his Lumbee heritage. The two faced each other as part of a six-man match at SummerSlam 1993, but the feud continued even after Tatanka's team emerged victorious.

At Survivor Series 1993, Owen Hart was eliminated during an elimination match when he crashed into his brother Bret Hart, who was walking along the ring apron, causing Owen to lose his focus and be pinned by Michaels. After the match, Owen interrupted his brothers’ victory celebration to verbally attack Bret. He demanded a match with Bret to settle the dispute. Bret refused, and the brothers reunited over the Christmas holidays. They decided to focus their energy on taking the tag team title from the Quebecers. Their plan was temporarily put on hold when Marty Jannetty and the 1-2-3 Kid won the belts, but the Quebecers won a rematch the following week, guaranteeing that the Harts would get their title shot.

Razor Ramon and Irwin R. Schyster (I.R.S.) began feuding prior to SummerSlam 1993 because of an angle in which Money Inc. (Ted DiBiase and I.R.S.) teased Ramon about losing to the 1-2-3 Kid, a newcomer to the WWF. The rivalry heated up when I.R.S. stole Ramon's gold chains while Shawn Michaels had Ramon distracted. Ramon and I.R.S. agreed to settle the feud at Royal Rumble 1994 with Ramon's Intercontinental Championship on the line.

The rivalry between Yokozuna and The Undertaker began at Survivor Series 1993. Yokozuna, who was pushed as an unstoppable monster, was unable to inflict any serious damage on The Undertaker when the two faced each other in an elimination match. Yokozuna slammed The Undertaker's head into the steel steps leading up to the ring, but The Undertaker was unharmed. Later, Yokozuna used his finishing move, the Banzai Drop, on The Undertaker. When he tried to repeat the move, however, The Undertaker became the first wrestler to sit up after the move, surprising Yokozuna and his managers. The Undertaker was granted a title shot in a Casket match. In the following weeks, it was revealed that Yokozuna had a fear of caskets. The Undertaker used this knowledge to gain a psychological advantage going into the match. On one occasion, Paul Bearer brought the casket to the ring to intimidate Yokozuna. When Yokozuna approached the casket to face his fear, the Undertaker popped out to scare Yokozuna.

Lex Luger wanted to participate in the Royal Rumble match, as the winner was scheduled to get a title shot for the WWF Championship at WrestleMania X. The contract he had signed for his title shot at SummerSlam 1993, however, stated that he would not receive a rematch if he failed to win the title. A compromise was reached, allowing Luger to compete. Yokozuna's manager, Mr. Fuji, was allowed to bring in two wrestlers, Genichiro Tenryu and The Great Kabuki, to hurt Luger's chances of winning.

== Event ==
Other on-screen personnel
Role:	Name:
Commentators	Vince McMahon
Commentators	Ted DiBiase
Commentators	Jim Ross (Radio WWF)
Commentators	Gorilla Monsoon (Radio WWF)
Interviewer	Todd Pettengill
Interviewer	Raymond Rougeau
Ring announcer	Howard Finkel
Referee	Earl Hebner
Referee	Danny Davis
Referee	Joey Marella
Referee	Tim White

In a dark match before the broadcast, the Brooklyn Brawler defeated Jim Powers. The Brawler used a swinging neckbreaker to get the victory. As the pay per view broadcast began, Vince McMahon introduced Ted DiBiase as his commentary partner for the evening.

The first televised match was between Tatanka and Bam Bam Bigelow. Bigelow tried to attack Tatanka before the bell, but Tatanka moved. The two fought back and forth, and Bigelow gained momentum after Tatanka missed a crossbody from the top turnbuckle. Bigelow used his weight to keep the advantage, sitting on Tatanka and later using a bear hug to wear him down. After the two hit each other with simultaneous crossbodies, Tatanka began a war dance. Bigelow kicked Tatanka in the back of the head to regain the advantage but missed a moonsault attempt from the top rope, allowing Tatanka to perform a crossbody from the corner and get the victory.

This match was followed by the Tag Team Championship match. The match started slowly, but both teams soon began brawling in the ring. The Harts focused on Pierre, but Jacques was eventually able to tag in to rescue him. After Pierre regained the advantage, Owen tagged in and took control of the match. He applied the Sharpshooter to Jacques, but Pierre broke the hold. Bret tagged in but fell out of the ring and kayfabe hurt his knee when the Quebecers' manager pulled on the ropes. The Quebecers focused on Bret's knee until Bret regained the advantage and attempted to apply the Sharpshooter. He was not able to stand, however, so the referee stopped the match and awarded the victory to the Quebecers. After the match, Owen yelled at Bret for not tagging out of the match. He then turned on Bret by kicking his injured leg and leaving him lying in the ring. This left fans wondering if Bret Hart would even make the Royal Rumble match itself.

Next came the match between Irwin R. Schyster and Razor Ramon for the Intercontinental Championship, for which Jim Ross and Gorilla Monsoon took over the commentary roles. The match began with a brawl between the two, and Ramon got the early advantage. Schyster eventually threw Ramon over the top rope and attacked him on the floor. I.R.S. kept control of the match for quite a while, applying a reverse chinlock while using the ring ropes for additional leverage. After Ramon escaped the hold, he was able to perform a fallaway slam on Schyster. He then used an Irish Whip to throw Schyster into the corner, but the match turned around with a ref bump when referee Joey Marella was in the way and was kayfabe knocked unconscious. Shawn Michaels ran to the ring with his fake Intercontinental belt and hit Ramon with it, and Schyster helped revive Marella to count the pinfall. I.R.S. appeared to win the title, but referee Earl Hebner came to the ring and explained the situation to Marella. When Michaels' belt was discovered in the ring, the match was restarted. Ramon simply grabbed Schyster, who was standing on the second turnbuckle celebrating, and performed the Razor's Edge for the victory.

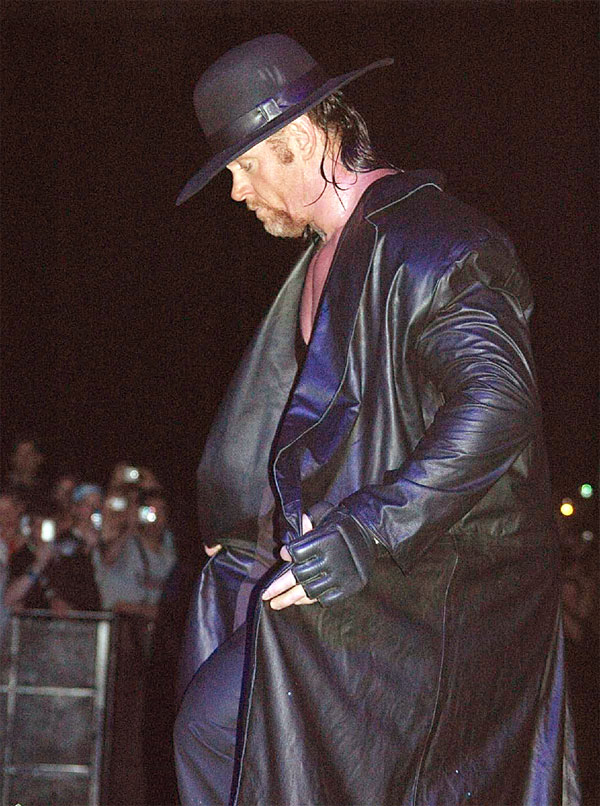
The Undertaker faced Yokozuna in a Casket match.

The next match was the casket match; the first wrestler to get his opponent in the casket and close the lid would win the match and the WWF World Heavyweight Championship. Yokozuna had great difficulty inflicting any serious damage on The Undertaker, but it was soon revealed that Mr. Fuji had arranged for several wrestlers to get involved on Yokozuna's behalf. Crush, The Great Kabuki, Genichiro Tenryu and Bam Bam Bigelow interfered, but The Undertaker was able to fight back until Mr. Fuji stole The Undertaker's urn from Paul Bearer. Yokozuna opened the urn, and smoke poured out. Meanwhile, Adam Bomb, Jeff Jarrett, The Headshrinkers (Samu and Fatu) and Diesel then came to the ring to help Yokozuna. Eventually, Yokozuna and his allies were able to shut The Undertaker in the casket to end the match. They locked the casket and pushed it down the aisle until smoke started coming out of the casket. The Undertaker appeared on the video screen at the end of the aisle, vowing to return. The casket was shown exploding on the screen, although the casket in the arena did not explode. The Undertaker then appeared to rise to the ceiling of the Civic Center.

Before the Royal Rumble match began, commentator Vince McMahon revealed that WWF President Jack Tunney had shortened the interval between entrances from the traditional two minutes to 90 seconds due to time constraints. Kamala was supposed to compete in the match, but he was replaced by Virgil. Ludvig Borga could not compete due to his ankle injury and was replaced by Kwang, a newcomer to the WWF. In addition, the 1-2-3 Kid was replaced by Thurman "Sparky" Plugg, who was also making his debut. Bastion Booger was scheduled to be the twenty-fifth participant, but he did not appear for unknown reasons; Vince McMahon stated that he did not appear because he did not "feel good".

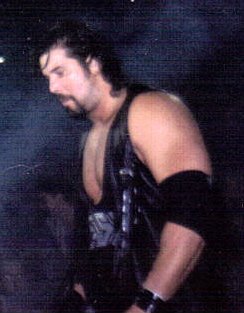
Diesel eliminated seven wrestlers from the Royal Rumble match.

The Royal Rumble match began, with Scott Steiner and Headshrinker Samu as the first and second participant. Early in the match, Diesel tied a WWF record by throwing out seven consecutive wrestlers. He was ultimately eliminated by a group of wrestlers, while his partner Shawn Michaels kept aloof. Although Diesel wrestled as a heel at the time, his performance earned him applause from the crowd.

Several ongoing feuds came into play during the match. Crush and his former friend, Randy Savage fought each other until Crush eliminated Savage. Bam Bam Bigelow and Doink the Clown also faced each other during the match. Doink had annoyed Bigelow with a series of pranks in late 1993, and the feud was supposed to be settled at Survivor Series 1993, but the team of "Doinks" that Bigelow fought was just The Bushwhackers and Men on a Mission dressed up as clowns. When they met in the Royal Rumble, Bigelow quickly eliminated Doink. The Royal Rumble match also saw an old feud rekindled. Shawn Michaels and Marty Jannetty, former tag team partners as The Rockers, traded a series of punches when Jannetty entered the match and Michaels ultimately eliminated Jannetty from the match. Due to being beat up by Owen Hart earlier in the night, there was a question as to if Bret Hart would even appear in the match. That question was answered when Bret Hart kayfabe limped to the ring as the 27th entrant in the match. Various different wrestlers went to work on his knee.

The final four were Fatu, Shawn Michaels, Bret Hart, and Lex Luger. The four sized up each other and then Bret Hart eliminated Fatu while Lex Luger took care of Shawn Michaels. Luger had Hart in a bear hug after punching his face a bit and then briefly lifted him up, but couldn't hold Hart up for very long. Bret Hart then moved both himself and Luger to the ring ropes. In an attempt to push Luger over the top rope, Bret Hart managed to push himself over as well. Both wrestlers crashed to the floor simultaneously which ended the match. Two referees argued about who had landed first while several inconclusive camera angles were broadcast. Meanwhile, ring announcer Howard Finkel declared one wrestler as the winner followed by the other. Eventually, WWF President Jack Tunney came to the ring and had Finkel declare both men co-winners. The situation regarding the title shot at WrestleMania X, which was to be given to the winner, remained unresolved until the following week on Monday Night Raw.

== Aftermath ==
Ludvig Borga did not return to the WWF after his ankle healed, so there was no closure to his feud with Tatanka. The feud between Tatanka and Bam Bam Bigelow was also soon forgotten. In the summer of 1994, both wrestlers joined Ted DiBiase's Million Dollar Corporation. The two eventually formed a tag team and unsuccessfully challenged for the WWF Tag Team Championship.

The feud between Razor Ramon and I.R.S. ended shortly after the Royal Rumble. On the January 31, 1994 edition of Monday Night Raw, the 1-2-3 Kid stole Ramon's chains back from I.R.S., bringing the feud to an end. Shawn Michaels’ attack on Razor Ramon increased the hostility between the two. The debate over the true holder of the Intercontinental Championship was settled at WrestleMania X in a ladder match with both belts suspended above the ring. This ended the feud between Michaels and Ramon, although Ramon continued to feud with Michaels' friend Diesel.

Owen Hart demanded a match against Bret Hart, which Bret repeatedly refused. This situation was complicated because of Bret co-winning the Royal Rumble. Jack Tunney decided that both Bret Hart and Lex Luger would get separate title shots at WrestleMania X. A coin toss would determine who was to compete in the first title match, with the other wrestler facing "suitable competition". Lex Luger won the coin toss that was televised on Monday Night Raw; Tunney then made the decision to have Bret Hart wrestle his brother, Owen, in the opening match at WrestleMania. (Had Luger lost the coin toss, he would have faced Crush.) Owen won the match, but Bret came out of WrestleMania with the WWF World Heavyweight Championship after Yokozuna dropped the title to him. This led to an extended feud between the two that saw Jim Neidhart return to the WWF to side with Owen and Davey Boy Smith to make a comeback to take Bret's side.

Several of the events during the Royal Rumble match led to feuds and pay-per-view matches later in 1994. Diesel's performance in the Royal Rumble match led to him becoming an up and comer in the WWF pecking order and he became the Intercontinental Champion shortly after WrestleMania X with assistance from Shawn Michaels. The duo later won the WWF Tag Team Championship the night before SummerSlam in August. At SummerSlam, however, Michaels cost Diesel the Intercontinental Championship by inadvertently kicking him when Razor Ramon ducked out of the way. Finally, at Survivor Series in November, the still-simmering tension between the two friends boiled over when Michaels hit Diesel with another kick intended for Razor during their Survivor Series elimination match. Diesel became irate and chased after Michaels, who escaped in a car and declared their friendship and team over.

Meanwhile, Crush and Randy Savage faced each other in a Falls Count Anywhere match at WrestleMania X to settle their feud, and Doink and his midget sidekick Dink faced Bigelow and his kayfabe girlfriend Luna Vachon in a mixed tag match.

The Undertaker did not appear in the WWF for several months after his loss to Yokozuna. In reality, he was given time off to allow a back injury to heal. During his absence, the WWF promoted his return by showing video clips of people who claimed to have seen The Undertaker. Ted DiBiase claimed to have brought The Undertaker back to the WWF, but Paul Bearer informed him that DiBiase's Undertaker was an impostor. Paul Bearer claimed to have located the true Undertaker, which led to a match at SummerSlam 1994 between DiBiase's Undertaker (portrayed by Brian Lee) and Paul Bearer's original Undertaker. After defeating the false Undertaker, Bearer's Undertaker got revenge against Yokozuna by winning a Casket match at Survivor Series 1994. To help prevent outside interference, Chuck Norris was brought in as a guest referee.

This would be the last Royal Rumble held on a Saturday until the 2022 event, after which, Saturdays would become the standard night for PPV events (which were rebranded as premium live events that year), with only a select few events held on Sundays.

== Home media and streaming ==
The event was released on VHS by Coliseum Video in the United States and by Silver Vision in the United Kingdom. The British release, unlike the American version, also includes the pre-shown "Countdown" event.

In June 2005, it was re-released on DVD in the United Kingdom as part of Silver Vision's Tagged Classics range, and was paired with Royal Rumble 1993. This DVD set was not released in the USA.

In 2014, the event was included on the WWE's streaming platform the WWE Network as part of its launch and remained on the service until the platform closed. In January 2024, WWE uploaded the Royal Rumble match to their YouTube channel.

As of October 2026, subscribers in multiple territories, including the US, Canada and the UK, can stream the event on Netflix, thanks to the WWE's ten-year agreement with the company.

== Results ==
No.	Results	Stipulations	Times
1^{D}	The Brooklyn Brawler defeated Jim Powers	Singles match	1:11
2	Tatanka defeated Bam Bam Bigelow (with Luna Vachon)	Singles match	8:12
3	The Quebecers (Jacques and Pierre) (c) (with Johnny Polo) defeated Bret Hart and Owen Hart	Tag team match for the WWF Tag Team Championship	16:48
4	Razor Ramon (c) defeated Irwin R. Schyster	Singles match for the WWF Intercontinental Championship	11:30
5	Yokozuna (c) (with Mr. Fuji and Jim Cornette) defeated The Undertaker (with Paul Bearer) by putting Undertaker in the casket with the lid completely shut	Casket match for the WWF Championship	14:20
6	Bret Hart and Lex Luger co-won by last eliminating each other	30-man Royal Rumble match for a WWF Championship match at WrestleMania X	55:04
(c) / – the champion(s) heading into the match; D / – this was a dark match

=== Royal Rumble entrances and eliminations ===
A new entrant came out approximately every 90 seconds.

Draw	Entrant	Order	Eliminated by	Time	Eliminations
1	Scott Steiner	4	Diesel	09:00	1
2	Samu	1	Scott Steiner	03:13	0
3	Rick Steiner	2	Owen Hart	03:57	0
4	Kwang	6	Diesel	05:57	0
5	Owen Hart	5	Diesel	04:10	1
6	Bart Gunn	3	Diesel	02:30	0
7	Diesel	13	Crush, Bam Bam Bigelow, Mabel, Thurman "Sparky" Plugg, and Shawn Michaels	17:41	7
8	Bob Backlund	7	Diesel	00:41	0
9	Billy Gunn	8	Diesel	00:14	0
10	Virgil	9	Diesel	00:32	0
11	Randy Savage	11	Crush	04:38	1
12	Jeff Jarrett	10	Randy Savage	01:19	0
13	Crush	17	Bam Bam Bigelow, Thurman "Sparky" Plugg, Lex Luger, and Bret Hart	25:03	3
14	Doink the Clown	12	Bam Bam Bigelow	01:48	0
15	Bam Bam Bigelow	24	Lex Luger	30:12	5
16	Mabel	14	Crush, Bam Bam Bigelow, Thurman "Sparky" Plugg, Shawn Michaels, Greg Valentine, Tatanka, and the Great Kabuki	09:57	1
17	Thurman "Sparky" Plugg	18	Shawn Michaels and Bret Hart	21:33	3
18	Shawn Michaels	28	Lex Luger	29:17	4
19	Mo	22	Fatu	22:46	0
20	Greg Valentine	19	Rick Martel	20:39	1
21	Tatanka	23	Bam Bam Bigelow	20:07	2
22	The Great Kabuki	15	Lex Luger	02:46	1
23	Lex Luger	-	Co-winner	21:58	7
24	Genichiro Tenryu	26	Lex Luger and Bret Hart	17:21	0
25	Bastion Booger	16	Unable to compete due to illness.	00:00	0
26	Rick Martel	20	Tatanka	11:22	1
27	Bret Hart	-	Co-winner	15:08	5
28	Fatu	27	Bret Hart	13:04	1
29	Marty Jannetty	25	Shawn Michaels	08:18	0
30	Adam Bomb	21	Lex Luger	04:55	0

- This is the first and only Royal Rumble to have co-winners. A similar scenario happened at the 2005 Royal Rumble when John Cena and Batista both landed on the floor at the same time. Vince McMahon came to the ring and order the match restarted with Cena and Batista as the sole competitors.
