= SummerSlam (1994) =

World Wrestling Federation pay-per-view event

- Promotional poster featuring The Undertaker
- Promotion: World Wrestling Federation
- Date: August 29, 1994
- City: Chicago, Illinois
- Venue: United Center
- Attendance: 23,300
- Buy rate: 300,000
- Tagline: So Hot It's Scary

Pay-per-view chronology
← Previous; King of the Ring	Next → Survivor Series

SummerSlam chronology
← Previous; 1993	Next → 1995

The 1994 SummerSlam was a professional wrestling pay-per-view (PPV) event produced by the World Wrestling Federation (WWF, renamed WWE in 2002). It was the seventh annual SummerSlam and took place on Monday, August 29, 1994, at the United Center in Chicago, Illinois. This was the United Center's first major event as well as its first professional wrestling event as the venue had only opened 11 days before SummerSlam. This was also the final SummerSlam to be held on a Monday, as it moved to Sunday the following year where it remained until 2021 when it moved to Saturday before the event expanded to a two-night broadcast on Saturday and Sunday beginning in 2025.

Eight matches were contested at the event, including one dark match held before the live broadcast. The pay-per-view had two main events. The first pitted Owen Hart against his brother Bret Hart in a steel cage match for the WWF Championship. Bret won the match, but the storyline feud escalated after Owen and his brother-in-law Jim Neidhart attacked Bret after the match. The other main event saw The Undertaker defeat an impostor Undertaker (portrayed by Brian Lee). The undercard included a match for the WWF Intercontinental Championship between Diesel and Razor Ramon, which Ramon won to regain the title. The other major angle going into SummerSlam was a feud in which Tatanka accused Lex Luger of joining the Million Dollar Corporation, a stable of heel wrestlers. This storyline turned out to be a swerve, as Tatanka was revealed to have secretly joined the corporation.

== Production ==
=== Background ===
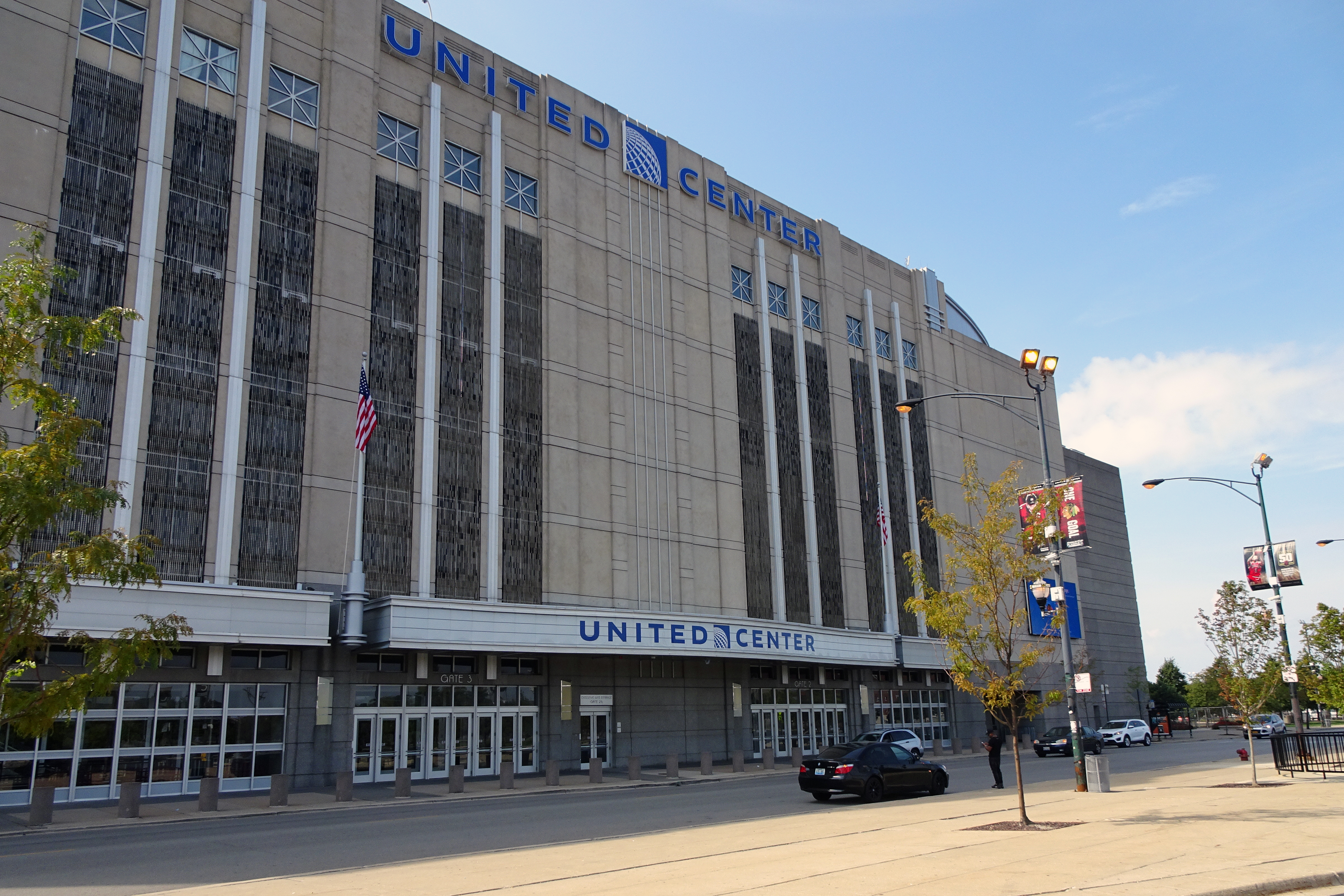
The seventh annual SummerSlam was held at the United Center in Chicago, Illinois. This was the venue's first major event as well as its first professional wrestling event as the United Center had only opened 11 days before SummerSlam.

SummerSlam is an annual professional wrestling pay-per-view (PPV) event produced every August by the World Wrestling Federation (WWF, renamed WWE in 2002) since 1988. Dubbed "The Biggest Party of the Summer", it is one of the promotion's original four PPVs, along with WrestleMania, Royal Rumble, and Survivor Series, referred to as the "Big Four", and was considered one of the "Big Five" PPVs with the addition of King of the Ring in 1993. It has since become considered the WWF's second biggest event of the year behind WrestleMania. The seventh SummerSlam was scheduled for Monday, August 29, 1994, at the United Center in Chicago, Illinois. This was the United Center's first major event as well as its first professional wrestling event as the venue had only opened 11 days before SummerSlam.

=== Storylines ===
Kwang and Adam Bomb were both managed by Harvey Wippleman. On May 28, 1994, a King of the Ring qualifying match between Bomb and the 1–2–3 Kid was televised on WWF Superstars. The angle saw The Kid win after Kwang attempted to interfere on Bomb's behalf. Kwang accidentally spat green mist in Bomb's face, allowing the Kid to get the victory. Wippleman had Bomb and Kwang work as a tag team, but problems continued between the two. The pair split after an argument cost them a match against the team of the 1–2–3 Kid and "Sparky" Thurman Plugg. Bomb and Kwang faced each other on house shows leading up to their dark match at SummerSlam 1994.

One of the WWF's main storylines in 1994 was Ted DiBiase's creation of a stable known as the Million Dollar Corporation. That summer, DiBiase purchased the rights to Bam Bam Bigelow's contract from Bigelow's kayfabe girlfriend, Luna Vachon. Irwin R. Schyster, DiBiase's former partner in Money Inc., also joined the stable. Bigelow and Schyster were paired together to challenge for the WWF Tag Team Championship. The night before SummerSlam, The Headshrinkers dropped the belts to Diesel and Shawn Michaels. The match took place as scheduled, but the title was not on the line.

In early 1994, the WWF brought back the WWF Women's Championship, which had been deactivated in 1990, and pushed Alundra Blayze to win a championship tournament and defeat all challengers. Luna Vachon was brought in to challenge Blayze in a series of matches but was defeated each time. The storyline then saw Vachon bring in Bull Nakano, a Japanese female wrestler, to gain revenge and challenge Blayze.

Razor Ramon had been feuding with Shawn Michaels since being pushed to win the WWF Intercontinental Championship in late 1993. After defeating Shawn Michaels at WrestleMania X, Ramon dropped the belt to Diesel, Michaels' bodyguard. A rematch was scheduled for SummerSlam 1994. Ramon brought in NFL Hall of Famer Walter Payton to be his cornerman and help prevent Michaels from interfering.

On the July 11, 1994 edition of Monday Night Raw, a major worked storyline began when Ted DiBiase announced that he had convinced Lex Luger to join the Million Dollar Corporation. Leading up to the pay-per-view, Tatanka confronted Lex Luger on several occasions, criticizing him for "selling out" to DiBiase. This led to a kayfabe admission from Luger that he had met with DiBiase, but Luger repeatedly denied having joined the corporation. He agreed to face Tatanka at SummerSlam to settle the argument.

Jeff Jarrett and Mabel had no real feud going into SummerSlam. Jarrett played the role of an aspiring country music singer, and Mabel portrayed a rapper. As a result, the WWF promoted the match as part of a "rap versus country" rivalry. There was little buildup for the match until Mabel confronted Jarrett on Monday Night Raw the week before SummerSlam. He tried to provoke Jarrett into a fight, but Jarrett walked away through the crowd to avoid Mabel.

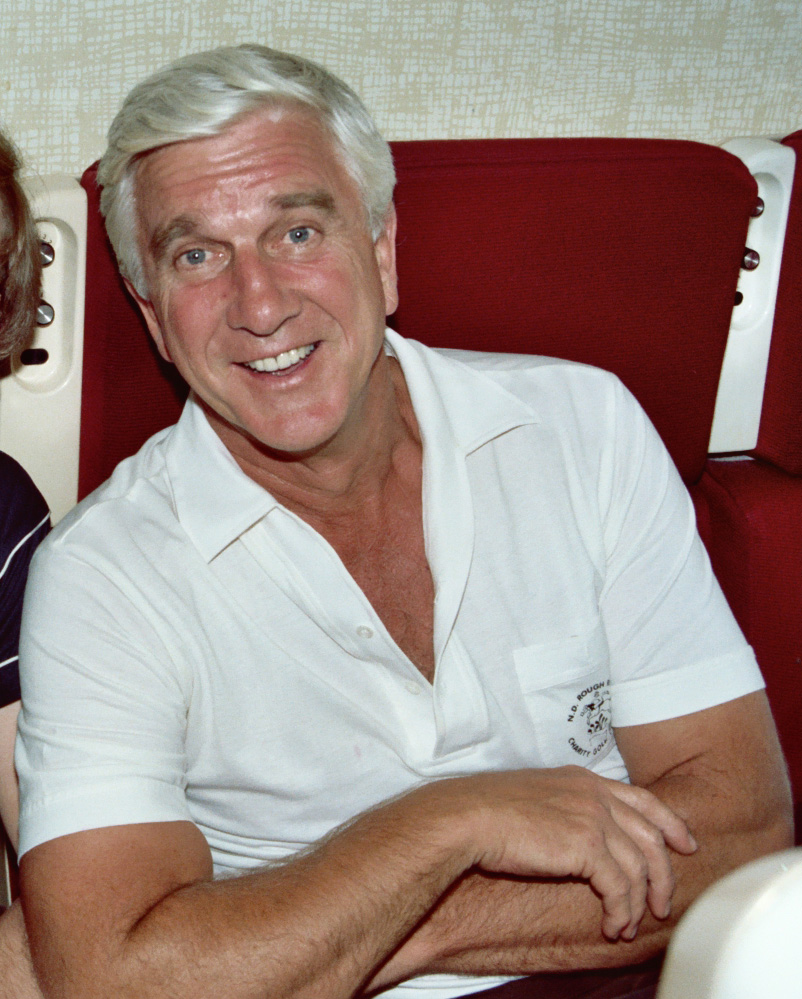
Leslie Nielsen was brought in to solve the mystery of The Undertaker.

The biggest storyline at SummerSlam began at the 1993 Survivor Series when Owen Hart was eliminated from the “Hart Brothers vs. Shawn Michaels and His Knights” elimination match due to miscommunication within the Hart team. Bret Hart was walking along the ring apron when Owen ran into him, causing Owen to lose his focus and be pinned by Michaels. After the match, Owen interrupted his brothers’ victory celebration to verbally attack Bret. The brothers reunited over the Christmas holidays and focused on challenging The Quebecers for the World Tag Team Championship at Royal Rumble 1994. During the match, Bret kayfabe injured his knee, which eventually caused the referee to stop the match. Owen then turned on Bret by kicking his injured leg and leaving him lying in the ring. Bret jobbed to Owen in the opening match at WrestleMania X but defeated Yokozuna later in the pay-per-view to win the WWF World Heavyweight Championship. Jim Neidhart, Bret and Owen's real-life brother-in-law, became involved at King of the Ring 1994 by aligning himself with Owen Hart. To settle the feud, Bret and Owen were booked to face each other in a Steel cage match at SummerSlam.

After losing a Casket match to Yokozuna at the 1994 Royal Rumble, The Undertaker did not appear in the WWF for several months. In reality, he was given time off to allow a back injury to heal. The WWF foreshadowed his return by airing videos of people who claimed to have seen The Undertaker. Eventually, DiBiase, who introduced The Undertaker to the WWF in 1990, claimed to have brought The Undertaker back to the WWF. However, Paul Bearer informed him that DiBiase's Undertaker was an impostor and that Bearer had located the true Undertaker. This led to a match at SummerSlam pitting the two Undertakers against each other. In the buildup to the match, Leslie Nielsen performed short segments trying to solve the mystery of how two Undertakers could exist in a spinoff of his roles on Police Squad! and The Naked Gun films.

== Event ==
Other on-screen personnel
Role:	Name:
Host	Randy Savage
Commentators	Vince McMahon
Commentators	Jerry Lawler
Interviewer	Todd Pettengill
Interviewer	Randy Savage
Ring announcer	Howard Finkel
Referee	Mike Chioda
Referee	Jack Doan
Referee	Tim White
Referee	Earl Hebner

In a dark match before the pay-per-view broadcast, Adam Bomb pinned Kwang. As the broadcast opened, the commentators, Vince McMahon (fresh off his federal trial acquittal, one month earlier) and Jerry Lawler, announced that The Headshrinkers had dropped the tag team title to Diesel and Shawn Michaels, and that the belts would not be on the line at SummerSlam. Throughout the broadcast, Nielsen and his co-star from The Naked Gun, George Kennedy, appeared backstage in skits trying to solve the mystery of the two Undertakers.

=== Preliminary matches ===
In the first televised match, The Headshrinkers were accompanied by managers Afa and Captain Lou Albano, and Bigelow and I.R.S. came to the ring with Ted DiBiase. Bigelow began the match by overpowering Fatu, but The Headshrinkers gained the advantage when Bigelow missed an Avalanche attempt. Schyster tagged in, and Bigelow pulled down the ropes to allow I.R.S. to throw Samu out of the ring. Outside the ring, Bigelow attacked Fatu with Schyster's briefcase. Samu performed a diving headbutt, but he was unable to get the pinfall. Ted DiBiase distracted the referee, which prompted Albano to protest. Meanwhile, Afa entered the ring to attack Bigelow. The referee saw Afa in the ring and awarded the match to Bigelow and Schyster as the result of a disqualification.

The following match saw Nakano challenging Blayze for the Women's Championship. Nakano used her size to perform such moves as leg drops and several submission holds. Blayze countered with aerial maneuvers like a hurricanrana and a spinning heel kick. Vachon got involved by choking Blayze while Nakano distracted the referee. The match ended when Nakano missed a diving leg drop, allowing Blayze to pin her for the win.

Early in the next match, Diesel threw Razor Ramon out of the ring, allowing Shawn Michaels to remove the turnbuckle padding. Walter Payton argued with Michaels about his interference, drawing the referee's attention. Michaels seized the opportunity to attack Ramon behind the referee's back. Diesel used two big boots and a series of submission holds to maintain the advantage. When he tried to throw Ramon into the unprotected turnbuckle, Payton pointed out the missing padding to the referee, who stood in the way to prevent the move. Soon after, Diesel tried to ram Ramon into the turnbuckle, but Ramon escaped and pushed Diesel into the turnbuckle. Ramon kept his momentum by performing a bulldog, a scoop slam, and a superplex. When Michaels tried to get involved again, Payton chased him around the outside of the ring. While the referee was distracted, Michaels entered the ring and tried to perform a superkick while Diesel held Ramon. Ramon moved, causing Michaels to kick Diesel instead. Ramon pinned Diesel to win the match and regain the Intercontinental Championship.

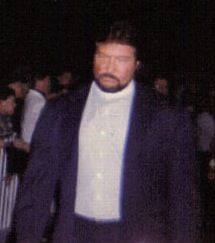
Ted DiBiase's plan helped Tatanka beat Lex Luger.

The match between Tatanka and Lex Luger began with the two wrestlers arguing. Luger relied on his power by punching and performing a shoulderblock. Tatanka focused on wearing Luger down with a wristlock and an armbar. After Luger performed a vertical suplex, Tatanka recovered and powerslammed Luger. Eventually, DiBiase came to ringside with a bag of money. As Luger yelled at DiBiase, Tatanka performed a schoolboy roll-up for the victory. After the match, Tatanka revealed that he had joined DiBiase's corporation. Tatanka attacked Luger and used the Million Dollar Dream, DiBiase's signature move, on Luger before leaving with DiBiase.

Mabel used his weight advantage to gain the early advantage in his match with Jeff Jarrett. Jarrett gained momentum when he tripped Mabel and performed a fist drop and two double axe handles from the ropes. On two occasions, Jarrett jumped on Mabel's back to perform sleeper holds, but Mabel backed him into the corner to escape both times. Mabel attempted to perform a splash from the second rope but missed. Jarrett attempted a sunset flip, which Mabel tried to counter by sitting on him. Jarrett moved out of the way and quickly pinned Mabel to win the match. In a reference to the 1994 Major League Baseball strike, Abe "Knuckleball" Schwartz was shown picketing in the crowd with an "I'm on strike!" sign.

=== Main event matches ===
As Owen Hart entered the steel cage for his WWF Championship match with his brother Bret, he immediately attacked Bret. Bret gained the advantage by performing a DDT. Owen kicked Bret in the head and tried to escape from the cage. The brothers both tried to climb over the cage several times, but neither would let the other escape. The match consisted mainly of brawling, including a couple of occasions when the two exchanged punches while standing on the top rope. Owen climbed over the cage, but Bret dragged him back in by pulling Owen's hair. Owen performed a piledriver on Bret, but Bret came back by throwing Owen into the bars of the cage. As Owen tried to escape, Bret suplexed him back into the ring from the top of the cage. Owen recovered and performed the Sharpshooter on Bret, but Bret escaped and used the same move on Owen. The match ended after Bret threw Owen's head into the steel cage and Owen's leg became trapped between the cage's bars. Bret climbed over the top of the cage and dropped to the floor to win the match and retain the title. After the match, Jim Neidhart attacked Davey Boy Smith, another brother-in-law of the Hart brothers. Neidhart padlocked the cage, and he and Owen attacked Bret until the other Harts could intervene.

The second main event match had Bearer's Undertaker fighting DiBiase's Undertaker. After DiBiase's Undertaker walked to the ring, Bearer appeared by himself while pushing a casket to the ring. He reached inside the casket and pulled out an urn, which had a light inside it when Bearer removed its lid. Bearer's Undertaker came to the ring and confronted DiBiase's Undertaker. Both wrestlers were wearing identical costumes, but Bearer's Undertaker wore purple gloves while DiBiase's wore grey. Bearer's Undertaker kicked his opponent out of the ring, where DiBiase's Undertaker tried to attack Bearer. DiBiase's Undertaker attempted to perform an arm twist ropewalk chop, but Bearer's Undertaker stopped him and performed the move. DiBiase's Undertaker then performed a chokeslam and a Tombstone piledriver. As he tried for another Tombstone piledriver, Bearer's Undertaker reversed it and performed the move. Bearer's Undertaker then performed two more Tombstone piledrivers before getting the pinfall victory. A group of people dressed as druids came to ringside, put DiBiase's Undertaker in the casket, and took the casket away.

== Aftermath ==
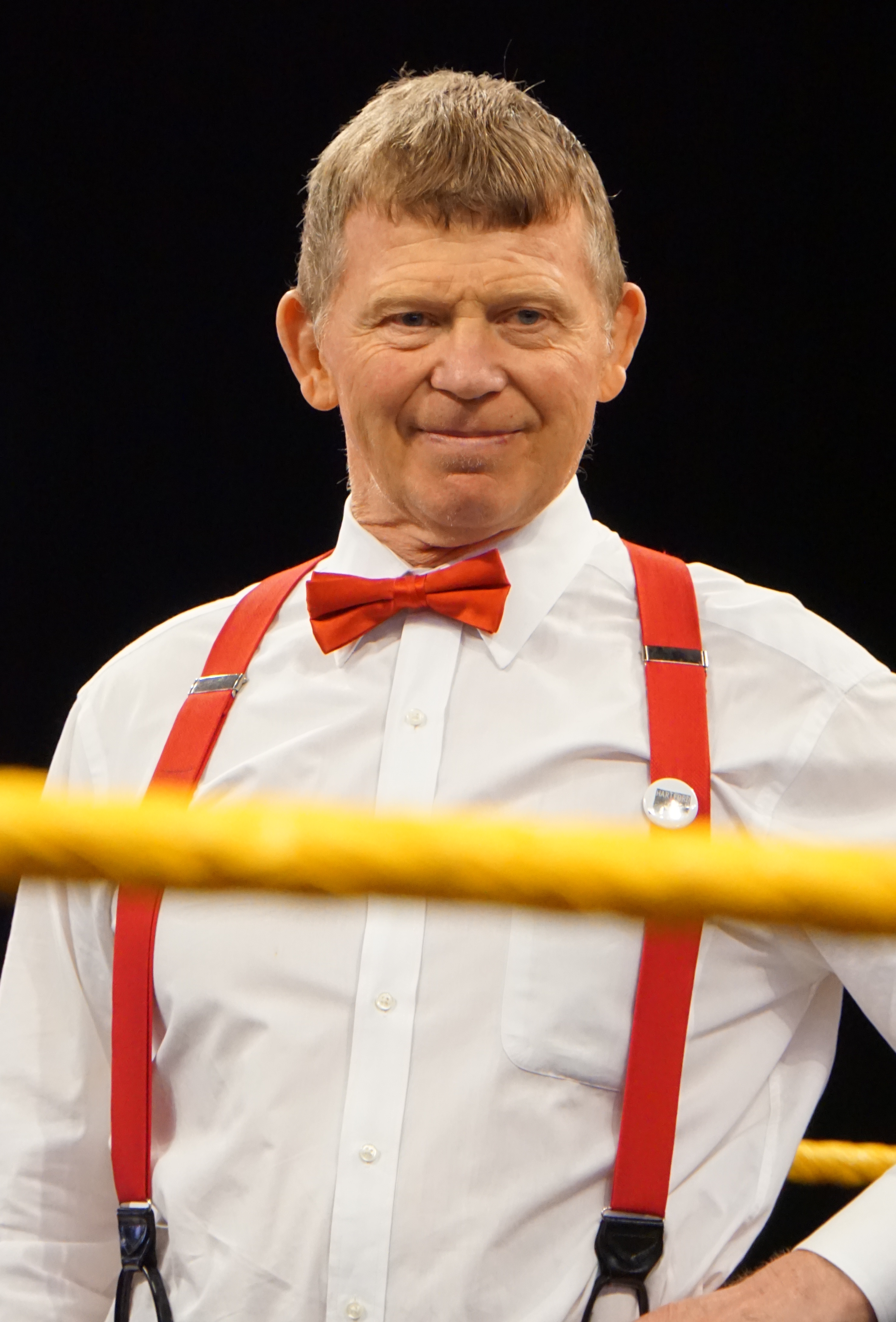
Bob Backlund beat Bret Hart at Survivor Series after Owen Hart interfered.

DiBiase continued to manage his corporation until he left the WWF in 1996, but none of his wrestlers won a championship under his management. Tatanka and Luger continued to feud until they faced each other as part of an elimination match at the 1994 Survivor Series. Bigelow was later "fired" from the stable, leading to a feud with DiBiase's wrestlers.

Nakano was booked to win the Women's Championship on November 27, 1994. After Blayze won it back the following spring, Nakano disappeared from the WWF without mention and joined World Championship Wrestling.

Bret Hart was scheduled to defend his title against Bob Backlund at Survivor Series 1994. The stipulations stated that the only way to win was to force the person in your opponent's corner to throw a towel into the ring. Davey Boy Smith was in Bret's corner, while Owen Hart was in Backlund's corner. Smith chased Owen around the ring until Smith suffered a kayfabe injury, leaving nobody to throw in Bret's towel. As Backlund performed the crossface chickenwing on Bret, Owen pretended to show remorse. He convinced his mother, Helen, to throw in Bret's towel. After Backlund was awarded the belt, Owen celebrated his success in costing Bret the title.

At Survivor Series 1994, the storyline with Michaels and Diesel saw Michaels accidentally superkick Diesel once again. As a result, Diesel turned on Michaels, becoming a face and vacating the Tag Team Championship. Three days later, Bob Backlund put Diesel over by dropping his WWF World Heavyweight Championship in a match that lasted eight seconds. Diesel feuded with Michaels and defended the belt against him at WrestleMania XI.

DiBiase's Undertaker was not seen again, but the wrestler portraying him, Brian Lee, returned to the WWF in 1997 as Chainz. Bearer's Undertaker gained revenge against Yokozuna at Survivor Series 1994 by defeating him in a casket match. To prevent interference, Chuck Norris was at ringside as a special guest enforcer.

== Home media and streaming ==
The event was released on VHS by Coliseum Video in the United States and by Silver Vision in the United Kingdom. Both the US and British versions include segments and interviews that weren't originally broadcast on pay-per-view. These include highlights of a charity softball match involving WWF wrestlers and interviews with Razor Ramon, Diesel and Shawn Michaels.The British version of the tape also includes the pre-show 'Countdown' event.

In July 2006, it was re-released on DVD in the United Kingdom as part of Silver Vision's Tagged Classics range, and was paired with SummerSlam 1995. This DVD set was not released in the USA.

In 2014, the event was included on the WWE's streaming platform the WWE Network as part of its launch and remained on the service until the platform closed.

In August 2020, WWE uploaded the main event to stream freely on their YouTube channel. This was followed in August 2025 with the upload of the Razor Ramon and Diesel match to their WWE Vault channel.

As of October 2026, subscribers in multiple territories, including the US, Canada and the UK, can stream the event on Netflix, thanks to the WWE's ten-year agreement with the company.

== Results ==
No.	Results	Stipulations	Times
1^{D}	Adam Bomb defeated Kwang	Singles match	—
2	The Million Dollar Corporation (Bam Bam Bigelow and Irwin R. Schyster) (with Ted DiBiase) defeated The Headshrinkers (Fatu and Samu) (with Afa and Lou Albano) by disqualification	Tag team match	7:20
3	Alundra Blayze (c) defeated Bull Nakano (with Luna Vachon)	Singles match for the WWF Women's Championship	8:10
4	Razor Ramon (with Walter Payton) defeated Diesel (c) (with Shawn Michaels)	Singles match for the WWF Intercontinental Championship	15:03
5	Tatanka defeated Lex Luger	Singles match	6:02
6	Jeff Jarrett defeated Mabel (with Oscar)	Singles match	5:45
7	Bret Hart (c) defeated Owen Hart by escaping the cage	Steel Cage match for the WWF Championship	32:22
8	The Undertaker (with Paul Bearer) defeated The Undertaker (with Ted DiBiase)	Singles match	8:57
(c) / – the champion(s) heading into the match; D / – this was a dark match
