= Survivor Series (1993) =

World Wrestling Federation pay-per-view event

- Promotional posters show Tatanka, Lex Luger, and The Steiner Brothers (Rick and Scott Steiner) feasting on a turkey dressed as Yokozuna (top), and The Quebecers, Ludvig Borga, and Yokozuna feasting on a turkey dressed as Lex Luger (bottom)
- Promotion: World Wrestling Federation
- Date: November 24, 1993
- City: Boston, Massachusetts
- Venue: Boston Garden
- Attendance: 15,509
- Buy rate: 180,000
- Tagline: "The Thanksgiving Tradition All Americans/Foreign Fanatics Wait For!"

Pay-per-view chronology
← Previous; SummerSlam	Next → Royal Rumble

Survivor Series chronology
← Previous; 1992	Next → 1994

The 1993 Survivor Series was a professional wrestling pay-per-view (PPV) event produced by the World Wrestling Federation (WWF, renamed WWE in 2002). It was the seventh annual Survivor Series event and took place on Thanksgiving Eve in the United States on Wednesday, November 24, 1993, at the Boston Garden in Boston, Massachusetts. The event centered on the Survivor Series match, a tag team elimination match that pits teams of multiple wrestlers against each other.

The pay-per-view broadcast consisted of five matches, and there was also one dark match before the event aired live. Four of the five matches were Survivor Series matches, while the other bout was a standard tag team match in a cross promotion with Smoky Mountain Wrestling (SMW) for the SMW Tag Team Championship. The main event was a Survivor Series match that saw the All-Americans, a team of face wrestlers from the United States, competing against the Foreign Fanatics, a team of heels that represented other countries. The All-Americans won the match with Lex Luger as the sole survivor. In an undercard match, four members of the Hart family competed against Shawn Michaels and a group of masked men. The original plan was for the Harts to face Jerry Lawler, with whom they were feuding, but Lawler was not able to appear at the event having been fired after being indicted for raping a 15-year-old girl. The Harts won the match, but a confrontation between Bret Hart and Owen Hart after the match led to Owen turning against the family the following year.

The majority of the feuds remained unresolved and carried on to future events. Bam Bam Bigelow was scheduled to face his main rival, Doink the Clown, but Bigelow's team ended up facing four other wrestlers wearing clown makeup instead. Matches from the Survivor Series also helped set up feuds for Royal Rumble 1994, the WWF's next pay-per-view. Razor Ramon's rivalry with Irwin R. Schyster intensified at Survivor Series and led to Ramon defending his WWF Intercontinental Championship against Schyster at the Royal Rumble. This event also marked the beginning of The Undertaker's feud with Yokozuna, and Yokozuna defended his WWF Championship against The Undertaker at the 1994 Royal Rumble.

== Production ==
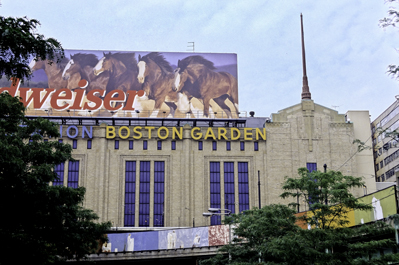
The seventh annual Survivor Series event was held at the Boston Garden in Boston, Massachusetts.

=== Background ===
Survivor Series is an annual professional wrestling pay-per-view (PPV) event, produced every November by the World Wrestling Federation (WWF, renamed WWE in 2002) since 1987, held around Thanksgiving in the United States. In what has become the second longest running PPV event in history (behind WWE's WrestleMania), it is one of the promotion's original four PPVs, along with WrestleMania, Royal Rumble, and SummerSlam, referred to as the "Big Four", and one of the "Big Five", along with King of the Ring that was established in June 1993. The event is traditionally characterized by having Survivor Series matches, which are tag team elimination matches that typically pits teams of four or five wrestlers against each other. Like the prior two years, the seventh Survivor Series event was scheduled to be held on Thanksgiving Eve on Wednesday, November 24, 1993, taking place at the Boston Garden in Boston, Massachusetts.

=== Storylines ===
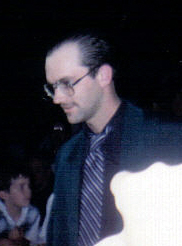
Harvey Wippleman caused problems between Rick Martel and Adam Bomb.

Several feuds surrounded the opening match, which saw the team of Razor Ramon, Marty Jannetty, the 1–2–3 Kid and Mr. Perfect face the team of Irwin R. Schyster (I.R.S.), Diesel, Rick Martel, and Adam Bomb. Diesel made his WWF debut on June 6, 1993, as a bodyguard for Shawn Michaels in a match between Michaels and Jannetty. Diesel's interference in the match helped Michaels to defeat Jannetty and win the WWF Intercontinental Championship. Diesel was also at ringside to help Michaels when Michaels faced Mr. Perfect for the title belt at SummerSlam 1993. Diesel attacked Perfect on multiple occasions during the match and ultimately caused Perfect to lose the match via countout. In September 1993, Michaels was stripped of the Intercontinental Championship by WWF President Jack Tunney. A battle royal was scheduled to determine the top two contenders for the championship. Ramon and Martel were the last two wrestlers in the ring, and they faced each other in a title match on the September 27 episode of Monday Night Raw. Ramon won the match and was awarded the championship belt. Schyster had initiated a feud with Ramon in May 1993 after Ramon lost a match to The Kid (later the 1–2–3 Kid), who was competing as a jobber at the time. Schyster and his tag team partner Ted DiBiase made fun of Ramon for the loss and offered him a job as a servant. In response, Ramon teamed with the 1–2–3 Kid for a series of matches against Schyster and DiBiase, and he also distracted Schyster during a match and caused him to lose to jobber P.J. Walker. Adam Bomb was not involved in any feuds with his opponents at Survivor Series, but there was animosity between Bomb and his teammate Rick Martel. Bomb's manager, Harvey Wippleman, was at ringside to help Martel in a match against Ramon. Wippleman was standing in the way of the match, and Martel ran in to him. While Martel was distracted, Ramon pinned him to win the match. Martel then yelled at Wippleman and pushed him. Bomb came to the ring to defend his manager, and an argument ensued until Diesel and Schyster came to the ring to calm their teammates.

Jerry Lawler spent much of 1993 building a feud with the Hart family. Lawler had been using the nickname "The King" since defeating Jackie Fargo for the NWA Southern Heavyweight Championship in 1974. After Bret Hart won the WWF's 1993 King of the Ring tournament, Lawler confronted him and claimed to be the only king in the WWF. Lawler then attacked Hart from behind, hitting Hart with the scepter and throne that had been set up for the coronation ceremony. The feud escalated when Lawler involved Helen and Stu Hart, Bret's parents, by insulting them while serving as commentator for WWF television programs. In what was billed as a "Family Feud" match, Bret Hart was joined by his brother Owen, who also worked for the WWF at the time, as well as his brothers Bruce and Keith, both of whom had also wrestled professionally. Lawler's partners were three masked wrestlers known only as the Blue Knight, the Red Knight, and the Black Knight. Lawler was unable to appear at the event, however, as he was indicted after being accused of raping and sodomizing a teenage girl. Shawn Michaels, who replaced Lawler in the match, also had a rivalry with Bret Hart dating back to the previous year. Hart, who held the Intercontinental Championship for much of 1992, defended the belt against Michaels many times, including in the WWF's first ladder match. They had also wrestled each other in the main event of Survivor Series 1992, when Hart defended his newly-won WWF World Heavyweight Championship against Michaels.

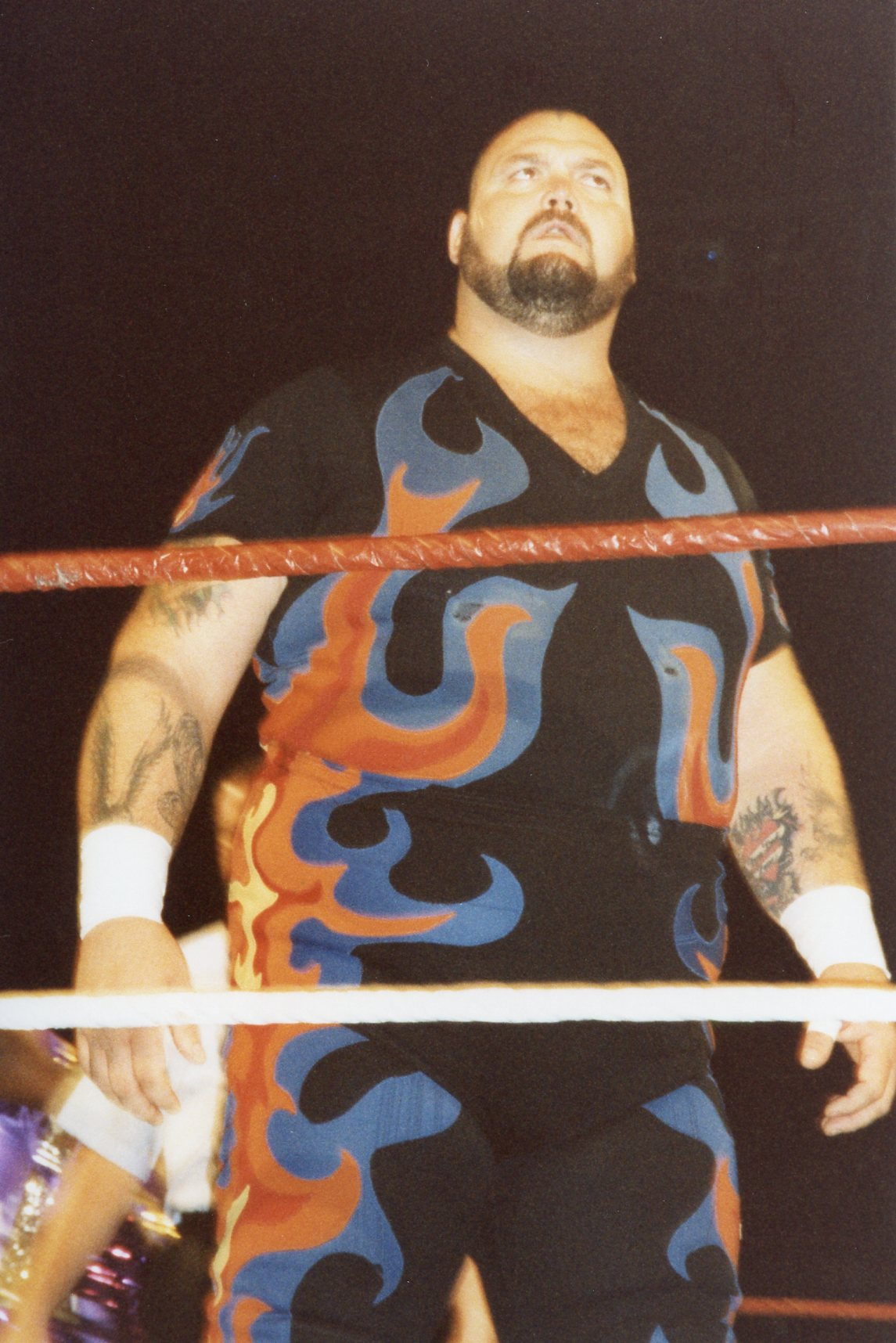
Bam Bam Bigelow feuded with Doink the Clown prior to Survivor Series.

The Smoky Mountain Wrestling Tag Team Championship was defended at Survivor Series as part of a working agreement between WWF owner Vince McMahon and Smoky Mountain Wrestling (SMW) owner Jim Cornette. The Rock 'n' Roll Express, who held the belts going into the event, had been feuding with The Heavenly Bodies over the title for over a year. The rivalry had been violent at times, including a barbed wire cage match and a Texas deathmatch.

Doink the Clown had annoyed Bam Bam Bigelow throughout October and November with such pranks as throwing water and confetti on him and dumping a pail of water on Bigelow's on-screen girlfriend Luna Vachon. He also tied a tripwire across the aisle during one of Bigelow's matches; after Bigelow fell over the wire, Doink attacked him with a broom. Bigelow responded by coming to the ring during one of Doink's matches and destroying Doink's toy wagon. The character of Doink was played by several wrestlers, who occasionally appeared at the same time. The match booked for Survivor Series advertised Bigelow teaming with Bastion Booger, who portrayed an overweight and dirty glutton, and The Headshrinkers (Samu and Fatu), a team of Samoans who were portrayed as savages, to face four Doinks. To promote the match, Doink appeared on the video wall that was part of the set during Bigelow's matches leading up to the event. The wall used a split screen to show multiple Doinks talking and laughing at the same time.

In the main event, the team of the All-Americans, which consisted of Lex Luger, Tatanka, and the Steiner Brothers (Rick Steiner and Scott Steiner) faced the Foreign Fanatics, which consisted of Yokozuna, Ludvig Borga, and The Quebecers (Jacques and Pierre). The main storyline behind the match began that summer when Yokozuna, a Japanese sumo wrestler, challenged any American athlete to bodyslam him on the deck of the USS Intrepid during an event on Independence Day. After several challengers were unable to lift Yokozuna, Luger arrived via helicopter and successfully performed what was termed "the bodyslam heard around the world". Luger was granted a match for Yokozuna's WWF World Heavyweight Championship at SummerSlam. Luger got a victory via countout but did not win the title. In the dressing room after the match, Borga, a Finnish wrestler, interrupted Luger's celebration by criticizing Luger and initiating a new feud. The Steiner Brothers spent the fall 1993 feuding with The Quebecers, a Canadian tag team. They had faced each other several times since The Quebecers had won the WWF Tag Team Championship from the Steiners on September 13. Since arriving in the WWF, Tatanka had been on a two-year winning streak. Borga ended the streak on the October 30, 1993, episode of WWF Superstars by pinning Tatanka after hitting him with a chair. After the match, Borga and Yokozuna attacked Tatanka, causing kayfabe injuries that forced Tatanka to withdraw from the match at Survivor Series. The All-Americans recruited The Undertaker to replace Tatanka. On the November 15 episode of Monday Night Raw, Luger defeated Pierre; as a result of a kayfabe injury in the match, the Foreign Fanatics had to replace Pierre with Crush, the sole American of the team. Crush was feuding with Randy Savage going into the event. They had been on-screen friends, but Crush was angry that Savage had not saved him from an attack by Yokozuna on the July 12, 1993, episode of Monday Night Raw. To make his injuries seem real, Crush did not appear on WWF television programming for several months. He made his return on October 18, accompanied by Yokozuna's manager, Mr. Fuji, claiming that they sympathized with Crush's sense of betrayal by Savage. Savage tried to make amends with Crush, who then attacked Savage and announced that he had turned against Savage and the United States and was aligning himself with Yokozuna, Fuji, and Japan.

== Event ==
Other on-screen personnel
Role:	Name:
Commentator	Vince McMahon
Commentator	Bobby Heenan
Commentator	Jim Ross (Radio WWF)
Commentator	Gorilla Monsoon (Radio WWF)
Commentator	Ray Combs
Interviewer	Todd Pettengill
Ring announcer	Howard Finkel
Referee	Dave Hebner
Referee	Danny Davis
Referee	Joey Marella
Referee	Tim White

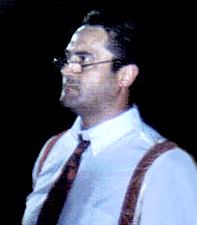
Irwin R. Schyster helped eliminate Randy Savage and Razor Ramon from the opening match.

Prior to the televised broadcast, Billy Gunn defeated The Brooklyn Brawler in a dark match. The first match on the pay-per-view event saw Razor Ramon, Randy Savage, the 1–2–3 Kid, and Marty Jannetty face Diesel, Irwin R. Schyster, Rick Martel, and Adam Bomb. Prior to the match, Ramon announced that Savage was taking the place of Perfect, who was unable to appear. Martel and Ramon began the match in the ring, but Martel soon tagged out to bring Bomb into the match. Ramon performed a suplex on Bomb and attempted to pin his opponent. Martel tried to rescue his partner but ended up hitting Bomb instead and causing an argument. The 1–2–3 Kid entered the match but was overpowered by Bomb and Diesel. After the Kid tagged out, Savage performed a diving elbow drop on Diesel before getting the pinfall to eliminate Diesel from the match. Ramon was attacked by his opponents but eventually tagged Savage back into the match. Savage got distracted when Crush appeared in the aisle, however, which allowed Schyster to eliminate him from the match. Ramon then performed a Razor's Edge on Schyster and pinned him. Ramon attempted the same move on Martel, but Schyster snuck back into the ring and hit Ramon with a briefcase. Ramon fell out of the ring and was counted out of the match. The remaining four wrestlers fought back and forth, but the 1–2–3 Kid eventually pinned Martel after a sunset flip. Almost immediately, Jannetty performed a sunset flip on Bomb to win the match for his team.

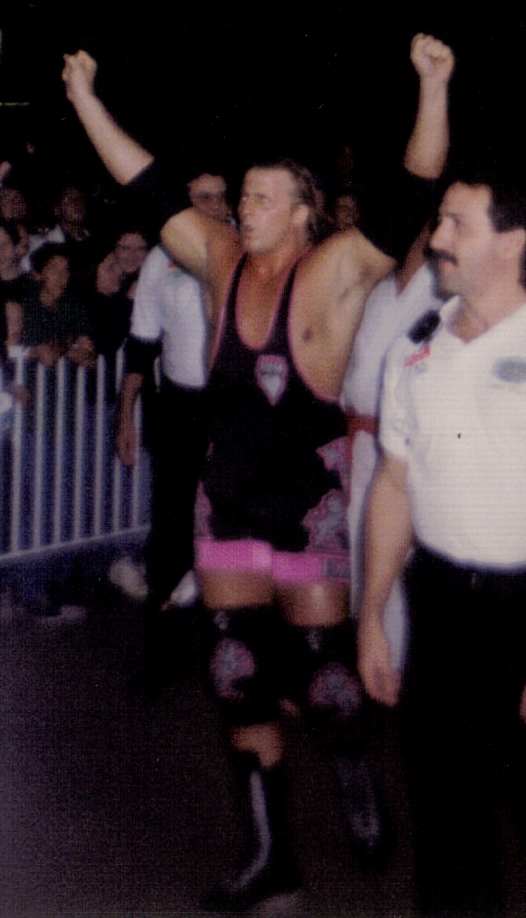
Owen Hart confronted his brother Bret after their match.

The next bout was the "Family Feud" match that saw the Hart brothers (Bret, Owen, Bruce, and Keith) facing Shawn Michaels and His Knights. The knights wore masks to hide their identities, but it has been revealed that Jeff Gaylord was the Black Knight, Greg Valentine was the Blue Knight, and Barry Horowitz was the Red Knight. Ray Combs, then host of Family Feud, told jokes to insult Shawn Michaels prior to the bout and later served as guest commentator for the match. Michaels began the match by wrestling Bruce Hart. Although Michaels was able to go on the offensive against the Hart brothers, the knights were unable to achieve much success against the Harts. At one point, all four wrestlers brawled in the ring, but Owen was able to eliminate the Black Knight after performing a missile dropkick. Michaels and the knights regained control of the match, but Bret turned things around by eliminating the Red Knight via submission to the Sharpshooter. Bret sustained a kayfabe injury after being thrown out of the ring and sat out of the match for a few minutes. Meanwhile, Michaels provoked Stu Hart into punching him. Inside the ring, Owen forced the Blue Knight to submit to the Sharpshooter, which left Michaels by himself. While Bret was standing on the ring apron, however, Owen ran in to him and got distracted. This allowed Michaels to pin Owen and eliminate him from the match. Bret dominated the rest of the match against Michaels until Michaels walked back to the locker room. As a result, Michaels was counted out, and the Harts won the match. After the match, Owen returned to the ring and yelled at Bret, blaming Bret for causing him to be eliminated from the match.

All four men began the SMW Tag Team Championship match in the ring. The Rock 'n' Roll Express (Ricky Morton and Robert Gibson) controlled most of the opening of the match with aerial maneuvers against The Heavenly Bodies (Jimmy Del Ray and Tom Prichard). Del Ray tried to help his partner but superkicked him instead. The Heavenly Bodies gained the advantage after Prichard performed a powerbomb on Morton, which Del Ray followed with a moonsault. Del Ray and Morton fought back and forth, with Del Ray performing another moonsault and Morton executing a hurricanrana. After all four wrestlers brawled in the ring once more, Del Ray hit Gibson in the back with a tennis racquet. Prichard then pinned Gibson to win the belts for The Heavenly Bodies.

The next match pitted Bam Bam Bigelow, Bastion Booger and The Headshrinkers (accompanied by Luna Vachon and Afa) against a team calling themselves the Four Doinks. After Bigelow's team was introduced, Doink the Clown's theme song began to play, but immediately switched to the theme of The Bushwhackers and Howard Finkel introduced the pair as Luke Doink and Butch Doink as they came down wearing clown wigs, with Luke riding a scooter and Butch pulling a wagon. As the fans waited to see who would be the other two Doinks, the intro to Doink's theme played again and the two Doinks were joined by Mabel Doink and Mo Doink with their rapping manager Oscar Doink; as they came to the ring they were referred to by Bobby Heenan as "Doinks on a Mission". Headshrinker Samu was eliminated first after he bit several of the balloons being carried by his opponents. He was purposely offered one more balloon by the Doinks, which he willfully bit into. Samu was stunned to find out that the balloon was full of water, which caused him to stumble back in surprise and Luke rolled him up and pinned him. Later, Booger has a chance to pin Luke after he hit the Trip to the Batcave on him. However, Booger got off of Luke and went to the corner where Headshrinker Fatu offered him a banana. As Booger was looking to perform the move again, his teammates dragged him away and Booger landed on his knees. Luke and Butch performed their trademark battering ram on Booger. Mabel then executed a leg drop on Booger and pinned him. Down four wrestlers to two, Bigelow's team appeared to be making a comeback when Fatu began taking down his opponents with the carcass of a turkey that Afa had been eating from the entire match. He then performed a top rope splash onto Mo. Fatu got distracted, however, and examined a banana peel with curiosity. Butch entered the ring with a bucket and faked out Fatu by making like he was going to toss the contents of the bucket onto him. This resulted in Fatu slipping on the banana peel, and Butch pinned him to eliminate him from the match. Left by himself, Bigelow began brutally atracking three of the Doinks and seemed to get the upper hand when Mabel entered the ring and Bigelow was unable to do much to him. Meanwhile, Butch dumped a bucket of confetti all over Luna, which caused Bigelow to become momentarily distracted and Mabel and Mo sandwiched him in the corner. Bigelow fell, Mabel performed a splash on him, and the referee counted the pin as the other three Doinks piled on. After the match, the real Doink the Clown appeared on the video screen to taunt Bigelow.

In the final match of the evening, The All-Americans, consisting of Lex Luger, The Undertaker, and The Steiner Brothers (Rick Steiner and Scott Steiner), competed against the Foreign Fanatics (Yokozuna, Ludvig Borga, Quebecer Jacques, and Crush). Scott Steiner and Jacques began the match, but Scott soon tagged in his brother Rick. Rick knocked Yokozuna out of the ring, but he was unable to perform much offense against Borga. Rick attempted a crossbody, during which Borga was supposed to catch him. Borga botched the move, but he pinned Rick anyway to eliminate him from the match. Crush faced Scott Steiner inside the ring, but Randy Savage then appeared in the aisle trying to get to the ring but was restrained by officials and The Smoking Gunns. Scott knocked Crush out of the ring, and Crush fought with Savage until being counted out of the match. Scott then turned his attention to Jacques before tagging Luger into the match. Luger eliminated Jacques with an elbow drop and a pinfall. Scott Steiner re-entered the match and executed a superplex on Borga. When he tried to pin Borga, however, Yokozuna entered the ring. Yokozuna performed a leg drop on Steiner and pinned him to even the match at two wrestlers each. Luger fought with Borga and Yokozuna before tagging The Undertaker into the match. The Undertaker gained control of the match, but Yokozuna turned the momentum around by performing his signature move, the Banzai drop, on The Undertaker. When he attempted the move a second time, The Undertaker sat up. The two men then fought outside the ring until both were counted out and eliminated from the match. Luger and Borga then fought back and forth until Luger performed a running forearm smash and pinned Borga to win the match. After the match, Santa Claus came to the ring to celebrate with Luger.

== Reception ==
The attendance for the event was 15,509, which generated $180,000 in ticket sales. Despite selling out in less than an hour in October, this was the lowest attendance for a Survivor Series event since 1989. The pay-per-view buyrate was 0.82, down from 1.4 the previous year, and was the lowest buyrate in Survivor Series history to that point.

The event has been rated by several sources. Adam Gutschmidt, writing for Online Onslaught, stated that "many of the substitutions hurt the matches" and that "the main event was bland". The Other Arena opined that the Four Doinks match was the worst on the card and that the confrontation between Lex Luger and Ludvig Borga was boring. Scott Criscuolo and Justin Rozzero reviewed the event for The History of WWE. Both writers gave Survivor Series 1993 a "C" rating and viewed the Family Feud match as the worst on the card. Matt Peddycord, writing for 411mania.com, gave the event a 5.5 out of 10 rating. He pointed to the crowd's chant of "We want Doink!" as evidence that fans were upset by the Four Doinks match.

Survivor Series 1993 was released on VHS by Coliseum Video on December 15, 1993, in North America. It was released in the United Kingdom by Silver Vision; the VHS version was released on March 14, 1994, and the DVD was released as part of the WWE Tagged Classics line (packaged together with Survivor Series 1994) on September 4, 2006.

== Aftermath ==
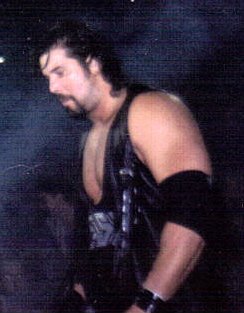
Diesel feuded with Razor Ramon over the WWF Intercontinental Championship.

Razor Ramon continued with two of his feuds after Survivor Series. Irwin R. Schyster stole Ramon's gold chains, which set up a match for the Intercontinental Championship at Royal Rumble 1994. Despite interference from Shawn Michaels, Ramon pinned Schyster to retain the title. Michaels and Ramon then faced each other at WrestleMania X. Diesel got involved, but Ramon won the match. Ramon then defended his title against Diesel on April 13, 1994. Diesel won the match and became the new WWF Intercontinental Champion. Ramon regained the belt in a rematch at SummerSlam 1994, however. Meanwhile, the 1–2–3 Kid and Marty Jannetty continued with their push from the promotion and won the WWF Tag Team Championship on January 10, 1994.

Owen Hart challenged Bret Hart to a match after Survivor Series, but Bret refused to fight his brother. The two reunited to face The Quebecers for the Tag Team Championship at Royal Rumble 1994. Bret sustained a kayfabe injury during the match, which forced the referee to stop the match. Owen blamed Bret for the loss and attacked him after the match. They faced each other at WrestleMania X, where Owen defeated Bret. The rivalry continued, however, and the brothers feuded throughout 1994 and into 1995. Bret's feud with Lawler remained, but the two did not face each other again until In Your House 1 in May 1995. The feud was reignited at that time, and they feuded at several pay-per-view events in 1995.

Bam Bam Bigelow's feud with Doink the Clown remained unresolved for several months. They were in the ring at the same time during the main event of the 1994 Royal Rumble, which was a battle royal-style match. Bigelow attacked Doink and eliminated him from the match. The blow off match came at WrestleMania X, where Doink and his midget sidekick Dink faced Bigelow and his girlfriend Luna Vachon in a mixed tag team match. Bigelow and Vachon won the match to settle the feud.

The Steiner Brothers continued to challenge The Quebecers, but they were unable to regain the Tag Team Championship. As a result of their confrontation at Survivor Series, The Undertaker and Yokozuna faced each other at Royal Rumble 1994 in a casket match for Yokozuna's WWF World Heavyweight Championship. Mr. Fuji, Yokozuna's manager, recruited several heel wrestlers to help Yokozuna win the match. The Undertaker supposedly died and disappeared from the WWF for several months, although, in reality, he was simply recovering from injuries. He resumed the feud with Yokozuna upon his return, however, and defeated Yokozuna in a casket match at Survivor Series 1994. Luger also continued his rivalry with Yokozuna. As a co-winner of the 1994 Royal Rumble match, Luger was granted a shot at Yokozuna's WWF World Heavyweight Championship. Mr. Perfect, who had returned to the WWF, was the referee for the match and turned heel by disqualifying Luger during the match.

Ludvig Borga was scheduled to continue his feud with Tatanka in a match at Royal Rumble 1994. Borga sustained a legitimate ankle injury, however, and never returned to the WWF. WWF writers had also planned to have Borga feud with Luger, but they were forced to drop the storyline because of Borga's departure.

Crush and Randy Savage also continued their feud. They fought each other during the battle royal at Royal Rumble 1994 until Crush eliminated Savage. To end the rivalry, they faced each other in a Falls Count Anywhere match at WrestleMania X, which Savage won.

== Home media and streaming ==
The event was released on VHS in 1994 in the United States by Coliseum Video and by Silver Vision in the United Kingdom. On both versions, material shot exclusively for home video was included. In the UK, the tape also included the pre-show countdown event.

The event was re-released on DVD in the United Kingdom in September 2006 as part of Silver Vision's WWE Tagged Classics range, and was paired with Survivor Series 1994. This DVD set was not released in the USA.

The event was uploaded to the WWE Network streaming service on the platform's launch in 2014 and remained on the service until it was shut down. As of September 2026, subscribers in multiple territories, including the US and the UK, can stream the event on Netflix.

== Results ==
No.	Results	Stipulations	Times
1^{D}	Billy Gunn defeated The Brooklyn Brawler	Singles match	7:46
2	Team Razor (The 1–2–3 Kid, Marty Jannetty, Randy Savage, and Razor Ramon) defeated Team I.R.S. (Adam Bomb, Diesel, Irwin R. Schyster, and Rick Martel) (with Harvey Wippleman)	4-on-4 Survivor Series match^{1}	26:58
3	The Hart Family (Bret Hart, Bruce Hart, Keith Hart, and Owen Hart) (with Stu Hart) defeated Shawn Michaels and His Knights (Shawn Michaels, The Black Knight, The Blue Knight, and The Red Knight)	4-on-4 Survivor Series match^{2}	30:57
4	The Heavenly Bodies (Jimmy Del Ray and Tom Prichard) (with Jim Cornette) defeated The Rock 'n' Roll Express (Ricky Morton and Robert Gibson) (c)	Tag team match for the SMW Tag Team Championship	13:41
5	The Four Doinks (Luke, Butch, Mabel, and Mo) (with Oscar) defeated Bam Bam Bigelow, Bastion Booger, and The Headshrinkers (Fatu and Samu) (with Afa and Luna Vachon)	4-on-4 Survivor Series match^{3}	10:58
6	The All-Americans (Lex Luger, Rick Steiner, Scott Steiner, and The Undertaker) (with Paul Bearer) defeated The Foreign Fanatics (Crush, Quebecer Jacques, Ludvig Borga, and Yokozuna) (with Jim Cornette, Johnny Polo, and Mr. Fuji)	4-on-4 Survivor Series match^{4}	27:59
(c) / – the champion(s) heading into the match; D / – this was a dark match

=== Survivor Series matches ===
^1

Eliminated	Wrestler	Eliminated by	Method	Time
1	Diesel	Randy Savage	Pinfall	10:20
2	Randy Savage	Irwin R. Schyster	Pinfall	16:47
3	Irwin R. Schyster	Razor Ramon	Pinfall	20:32
4	Razor Ramon	N/A	Countout	20:42
5	Rick Martel	The 1-2-3 Kid	Pinfall	25:49
6	Adam Bomb	Marty Jannetty	Pinfall	26:58
Survivors:	The 1-2-3 Kid and Marty Jannetty (Team Razor)			

^2

Eliminated	Wrestler	Eliminated by	Method	Time
1	The Black Knight	Owen Hart	Pinfall	10:49
2	The Red Knight	Bret Hart	Submission	18:06
3	The Blue Knight	Owen Hart	Submission	23:55
4	Owen Hart	Shawn Michaels	Pinfall	27:26
5	Shawn Michaels	N/A	Countout	30:57
Survivors:	Bret Hart, Bruce Hart and Keith Hart (The Hart Family)			

^3

Eliminated	Wrestler	Eliminated by	Method	Time
1	Samu	Bushwhacker Luke	Pinfall	3:02
2	Bastion Booger	Mabel	Pinfall	6:02
3	Fatu	Bushwhacker Butch	Pinfall	8:33
4	Bam Bam Bigelow	Mabel	Pinfall	10:58
Survivors:	The Bushwackers (Luke and Butch) and Men on a Mission (Mabel and Mo) (The Four Doinks) (clean sweep)			

^4

Eliminated	Wrestler	Eliminated by	Method	Time
1	Rick Steiner	Ludvig Borga	Pinfall	5:05
2	Crush	N/A	Countout	11:36
3	Jacques	Lex Luger	Pinfall	14:04
4	Scott Steiner	Yokozuna	Pinfall	16:57
5	The Undertaker	N/A	Double countout	22:26
6	Yokozuna	N/A	Double countout	22:26
7	Ludvig Borga	Lex Luger	Pinfall	28:02
Sole Survivor:	Lex Luger (All Americans)			
