= Royal Rumble (1995) =

World Wrestling Federation pay-per-view event

- Promotional poster
- Promotion: World Wrestling Federation
- Date: January 22, 1995
- City: Tampa, Florida
- Venue: USF Sun Dome
- Attendance: 10,000
- Buy rate: 225,000
- Tagline: 30 Men, 1 Winner, Something's Gotta Give!

Pay-per-view chronology
← Previous; Survivor Series	Next → WrestleMania XI

Royal Rumble chronology
← Previous; 1994	Next → 1996

The 1995 Royal Rumble was a professional wrestling pay-per-view (PPV) event produced by the World Wrestling Federation (WWF, renamed WWE in 2002). It was the eighth annual Royal Rumble event and took place on January 22, 1995, at the USF Sun Dome in Tampa, Florida. The event was based around the men's Royal Rumble match, a modified 30-man battle royal in which the participants enter at timed intervals instead of all beginning in the ring at the same time and the winner received a WWF Championship match at WrestleMania XI.

The event featured five matches on its card. The main event was the 1995 Royal Rumble match, which Shawn Michaels won after entering first and outlasting the 29 other wrestlers. This was the first time that the first entrant won the match. The event also featured a match for the WWF Championship, where Diesel defended the title against Bret Hart. The match was stopped when several other wrestlers interfered and the referee lost control of the match. Two other title matches took place; Jeff Jarrett won the WWF Intercontinental Championship from Razor Ramon, and The 1–2–3 Kid and Bob Holly won the final match in a tournament that determined the new WWF Tag Team Champions.

Several storylines from Royal Rumble 1995 were carried over to WrestleMania XI, the WWF's next pay-per-view. Bam Bam Bigelow attacked National Football League Hall of Famer Lawrence Taylor, who was sitting in the crowd; this set up a match between the two at WrestleMania. Pamela Anderson was at ringside and was supposed to accompany the winner of the Royal Rumble match to his WWF Championship match at WrestleMania. Although Shawn Michaels won the match, Anderson came to the ring at WrestleMania with Diesel. The Undertaker's feud with Ted DiBiase's Million Dollar Corporation also escalated, as DiBiase's men stole the urn that was said to give The Undertaker his power. Jarrett and Ramon continued to feud for several months, and Bret Hart targeted Bob Backlund because Backlund interfered in the WWF Championship match.

== Production ==
=== Background ===
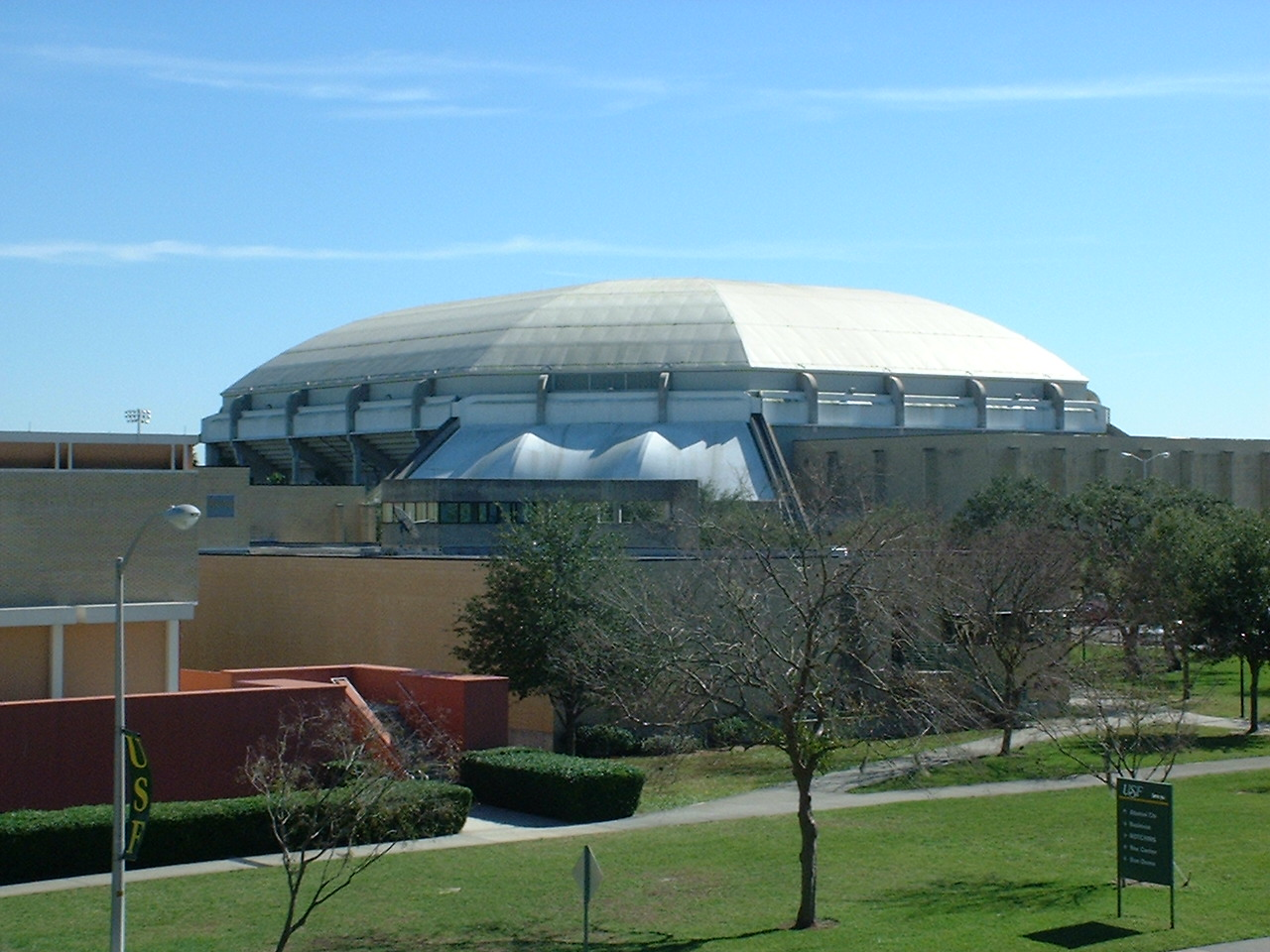
The eighth annual Royal Rumble event was held at the USF Sun Dome in Tampa, Florida.

The Royal Rumble is an annual professional wrestling event, produced every January by the World Wrestling Federation (WWF, renamed WWE in 2002) since 1988; that first event was a television special before it became an annual pay-per-view (PPV) beginning in 1989. It is one of the promotion's original four PPVs, along with WrestleMania, SummerSlam, and Survivor Series, referred to as the "Big Four", and was considered one of the "Big Five" PPVs with the addition of King of the Ring in 1993. It is named after and centered on the men's Royal Rumble match. The eighth Royal Rumble event was scheduled to be held on January 22, 1995, in the USF Sun Dome in Tampa, Florida.

The Royal Rumble match is a modified battle royal in which the participants enter at timed intervals instead of all beginning in the ring at the same time, and the match generally features 30 wrestlers. Since 1993, the winner earns a world championship match at that year's WrestleMania. For 1995, the winner earned a match for the WWF Championship at WrestleMania XI.

=== Storylines ===
The event comprised five matches that resulted from scripted storylines. Results were predetermined by the WWF's writers, while storylines were produced on WWF's weekly television show, Raw.

The storyline behind the WWF Championship match began in 1994, when Bret Hart was feuding with his brother Owen. After Owen was unable to win the title, he helped Bob Backlund win the belt from Bret at Survivor Series 1994. Three days after Survivor Series, Diesel faced Backlund and won the title belt. He agreed to grant a title shot to Bret Hart, who, like Diesel, was also a fan-favorite.

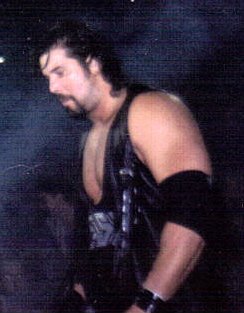
Diesel as WWF World Heavyweight Champion.

Also at Survivor Series 1994, Shawn Michaels and Diesel argued after Michaels accidentally kicked Diesel in the face. Although the pair held the WWF Tag Team Championship together, Diesel said that he did not want to team with Michaels any longer. The title was vacated, and the WWF held a tournament to determine the new champions. During the tournament, The Smoking Gunns were forced to withdraw when Bart Gunn was injured in a rodeo accident. As a result, the 1–2–3 Kid and Bob Holly took their place. The Gunns requested that they get a title shot after the tournament when Bart had recovered. The 1–2–3 Kid and Holly advanced to the finals, as did Ted DiBiase's team of Bam Bam Bigelow and Tatanka. The match to determine the new champions was scheduled to take place at the Royal Rumble.

The Undertaker had been feuding with DiBiase's Million Dollar Corporation since his return to the WWF from an injury in August 1994. During the match between The Undertaker and Yokozuna at Survivor Series 1994, Irwin R. Schyster, one of DiBiase's wrestlers, interfered in the match by attacking The Undertaker. The feud between The Undertaker and Schyster escalated when Schyster performed a series of vignettes in which he repossessed such items as tombstones and burial plots from people he claimed had not paid their taxes before dying. During the feud, Schyster was escorted to the ring for his matches by a group of hooded druids.

The feud between Jeff Jarrett and Razor Ramon began in late 1994 when Jarrett challenged Ramon for Ramon's WWF Intercontinental Championship. They faced each other several times, but Jarrett was unable to win the belt. Jarrett, who portrayed an aspiring country music star, was accompanied to the ring by The Roadie, who often interfered in matches on Jarrett's behalf.

Although no major feuds were featured in the Royal Rumble match, Baywatch star Pamela Anderson was in attendance at ringside. It was announced that she would accompany the winner of the match during his WWF World Heavyweight Championship title shot at WrestleMania XI.

== Event ==
Other on-screen personnel
Role:	Name:
English commentators	Vince McMahon
English commentators	Jerry Lawler
Spanish commentators	Carlos Cabrera
Spanish commentators	Ed Trucco
Interviewer	Todd Pettengill
Interviewer	Ray Rougeau
Interviewer	Stephanie Wiand
Ring announcer	Howard Finkel
Referee	Danny Davis
Referee	Jack Doan
Referee	Earl Hebner
Referee	Tim White

Prior to the live pay-per-view broadcast, Buck Quartermaine defeated The Brooklyn Brawler in a dark match.

In the first televised match, Razor Ramon defended his WWF Intercontinental Championship against Jeff Jarrett, who was accompanied by The Roadie. Ramon used his strength to dominate the opening of the match. Jarrett gained momentum with a series of dropkicks and then choked Ramon with a sleeper hold. Ramon ran at Jarrett but was thrown over the top rope. He hit his knee when he landed, and The Roadie then hit Ramon from behind in the knee. Ramon was unable to return to the ring, so Jarrett was awarded the match via countout. Because the championship cannot change hands on a countout, Jarrett challenged Ramon to continue the match. Ramon agreed and nearly pinned Jarrett twice. Jarrett applied the figure four leglock to apply pressure to Ramon's injured knee. Ramon escaped the hold and attempted to perform the Razor's Edge. He collapsed under Jarrett's weight, however, and Jarrett pinned him to win the title.

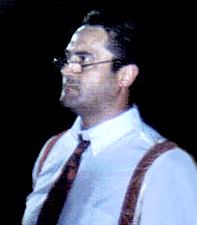
Irwin R. Schyster lost to The Undertaker but gained revenge by stealing The Undertaker's urn.

The Undertaker faced Irwin R. Schyster in the next match. The Undertaker gained the advantage at the beginning and held it until Ted DiBiase called his druids to the ring. When The Undertaker attempted to attack Schyster from the top rope, the druids shook the ropes and caused him to fall. Schyster performed a clothesline to knock The Undertaker out of the ring, where he and the druids attacked The Undertaker. When the match returned to the ring, Schyster was in control. Both men got knocked down, however, and a druid snuck into the ring and rolled Schyster on top of The Undertaker for a pinfall attempt. The Undertaker kicked out and attempted to perform the Tombstone Piledriver. A druid interfered to prevent the move, but The Undertaker performed a chokeslam on Schyster to gain the pinfall victory. After the match, Ted DiBiase called out Corporation member King Kong Bundy to help Schyster attack The Undertaker and steal the urn, which was said to be the source of The Undertaker's power.

The WWF World Heavyweight Championship match was next, in which Diesel defended the title against Bret Hart. Diesel began the match by clotheslining Hart, but Hart gained the advantage by focusing on injuring Diesel's knee. He performed the figure four leglock twice before attacking Diesel outside the ring. Diesel regained the advantage by using his size and strength to throw Hart and perform power moves to wear him down. Hart tied Diesel's legs to the ring post with a piece of tape and kicked him repeatedly. Diesel recovered and performed the Jackknife power bomb on Hart. Before the referee could count the pinfall, Shawn Michaels ran to the ring and attacked Diesel. The referee ordered the match to continue, and the match went back and forth until Hart used the Sharpshooter submission hold to place pressure on Diesel's injured leg. Owen Hart interfered by attacking Bret, but the match was ordered to continue. Bret Hart and Diesel brawled until Bret rolled Diesel up for a pinfall. The referee was knocked unconscious, and Michaels, Jarrett, and The Roadie came to the ring to attack Diesel. Meanwhile, Owen Hart and Bob Backlund attacked Bret Hart. Because the referee could not control the match, it was declared a draw and Diesel retained his championship.

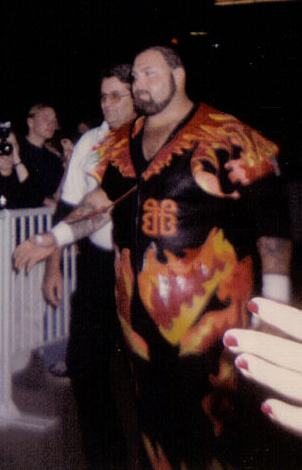
Bam Bam Bigelow attacked football star Lawrence Taylor after losing his match.

Bob Holly and the 1–2–3 Kid faced Bam Bam Bigelow and Tatanka next in the final match of the WWF Tag Team Championship tournament. Tatanka began the match by using his strength against Holly, but Holly soon turned the match around by performing a hurricanrana throw. Bigelow used his strength against his opponents, but the 1–2–3 Kid performed a hurricanrana on him as well. Bigelow regained the advantage by kicking the Kid in the back of the head and controlled the match until the Kid threw him out of the ring. Bigelow and Tatanka turned the match around again, using power moves to wear down their opponents. At one point, Bigelow held the Kid for Tatanka to attack, but Tatanka accidentally hit Bigelow instead. The match ended similarly, as Tatanka knocked Bigelow off the top rope when Bigelow attempted to perform a moonsault. The 1–2–3 Kid pinned Bigelow to win the match and the WWF Tag Team Championship. After the match, the crowd heckled Bigelow. He responded by pushing retired NFL player Lawrence Taylor, who was at ringside, laughing about Bigelow's loss.

In the main event, Shawn Michaels was the first entrant in the Royal Rumble match, while Davey Boy Smith was the second participant. Every 60 seconds, another wrestler entered the match. As Owen Hart made his way to the ring, he was attacked by his brother Bret. As a result of the attack, Owen was quickly eliminated from the match when Smith, his brother-in-law, threw him out of the ring. King Kong Bundy and Mabel, the two biggest competitors in the match, fought until Mabel eliminated Bundy. Lex Luger then entered the match and eliminated Mabel. Bret Hart returned later and attacked Bob Backlund as Backlund was about to enter the match. This enabled Luger to eliminate Backlund quickly, after which Backlund and Bret continued to fight. The final four participants remaining in the ring were Michaels, Smith, Luger, and Crush. Luger attacked Crush but was eliminated by Michaels. Crush then convinced Michaels to work with him but then turned on Michaels by attacking him. Michaels scratched Crush's eyes, which enabled Smith to eliminate Crush. Michaels and Smith, the first two entrants, were the last two wrestlers remaining. Smith threw Michaels over the top rope and began to celebrate. Michaels, who had only touched the floor with one foot, was not eliminated from the match, however. He attacked Smith from behind and threw him out of the ring to become the first wrestler to win the Royal Rumble after entering first. Michaels celebrated in the ring with Pamela Anderson.

== Reception ==
The event was attended by 10,000 fans, which is approximately the maximum capacity of the USF Sun Dome. This attendance figure was down from the previous year's attendance of 14,500, but higher than the following year, when 9,600 people attended Royal Rumble 1996. From the ticket sales, the WWF gained $140,000; again, this was lower than in 1994 but higher than in 1996. The pay-per-view buyrate of 1.0, however, was higher than 1994's 0.9 figure but lower than 1996's buyrate of 1.1.

Current WWE wrestler Cody Rhodes has stated that Michaels's win, in which he was the first wrestler to enter the ring in the #1 position and win the match, is his favorite ending to a Royal Rumble match. Reviewing the event for Online Onslaught, columnist Adam Gutschmidt evaluated the event as acceptable but not exceptional. He found the Royal Rumble match to be the best part of the show, although he claimed that the WWF's switch to having wrestlers enter every 60 seconds hurt the match. He also found the inconclusive ending to the WWF World Heavyweight Championship match frustrating and rated the match between The Undertaker and Irwin R. Schyster as a "dud". The event has also been rated by customers at Amazon.com, who have given the event four and a half out of five stars. Art O'Donnell, writer of the website WrestleCrap, inducted the 1995 Rumble match into the site's list of "the very worst in pro wrestling". He cites that most of the Royal Rumble participants' gimmicks and the lack of main event wrestlers (such as Jeff Jarrett, Scott Hall, and The Undertaker) as his reasons.

Royal Rumble 1995 was released on VHS in North America by Coliseum Video on March 8, 1995. It was released in the United Kingdom in VHS format on May 8, 1995. The event, packaged together with Royal Rumble 1996, was also released on DVD in the United Kingdom as part of the WWE Tagged Classics line on April 17, 2006. On October 15, 2007, WWE released the event in the United Kingdom as part of the Royal Rumble Complete Anthology DVD set.

== Aftermath ==
The day after Royal Rumble, the 1–2–3 Kid and Bob Holly faced The Smoking Gunns. The Gunns won the match and the WWF Tag Team Championship. By losing the belts after one day, the Kid and Holly tied the then-record for the shortest tag-team title reign in WWF history.

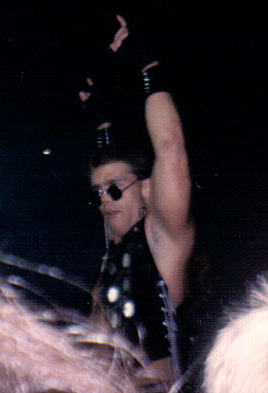
Shawn Michaels lost his WWF World Heavyweight Championship match at WrestleMania but reunited with former friend Diesel.

Razor Ramon faced Jeff Jarrett at WrestleMania XI in a rematch for the WWF Intercontinental Championship. To counteract The Roadie's interference, Ramon was accompanied by his friend the 1–2–3 Kid. Ramon won the match by disqualification but did not win the title. On May 19, 1995, Ramon defeated Jarrett in a ladder match to regain the championship, but Jarrett won the belt back three days later.

The Undertaker faced King Kong Bundy at WrestleMania XI. Although The Undertaker won the match, Kama, another member of DiBiase's Corporation, took possession of the urn and melted it down into a necklace. The Undertaker defeated Kama in dark matches at In Your House 1 and In Your House 2. They faced each other in a casket match at SummerSlam, which The Undertaker won to end the feud.

Bret Hart wrestled an "I Quit" match against Bob Backlund at WrestleMania. Hart won the match after special referee Roddy Piper determined that Backlund had conceded defeat. Bret's feud with Owen was not featured again, but the two did not reunite until they formed The Hart Foundation in 1997 with brothers-in-law Davey Boy Smith and Jim Neidhart.

Despite Michaels winning the right to be escorted by Pamela Anderson to his WWF World Heavyweight Championship match against Diesel at WrestleMania, Anderson came to the ring with Diesel instead. Michaels's bodyguard, Sycho Sid, attempted to interfere on Michaels's behalf but ultimately helped Diesel retain the title. Michaels became the second man to win the Rumble but lose his WrestleMania title match. Diesel offered Michaels a rematch, and Michaels told Sid that he would not be needed in the upcoming match. Upset with Michaels, Sid attacked Michaels until Diesel came to Michaels's rescue. Diesel and Michaels became allies once again and teamed up to win the WWF Tag Team Championship later that year.

Bam Bam Bigelow challenged Lawrence Taylor to a match, which Taylor accepted after initially refusing. Diesel trained Taylor, who beat Bigelow at WrestleMania XI. Embarrassed, Bigelow challenged Diesel to a match for the WWF World Heavyweight Championship. Tatanka was at ringside for the match; he turned on Bigelow and caused him to lose. Bigelow attacked Tatanka after the match, which led Sid, a new addition to the Corporation, to come to Tatanka's defense. This led to a tag team match at King of the Ring, where Diesel and Bigelow defeated Tatanka and Sid.

== Results ==
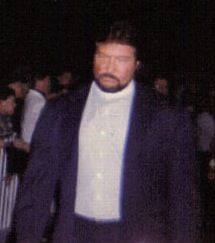
Ted DiBiase's wrestlers did not win any matches.

No.	Results	Stipulations	Times
1^{D}	Buck Quartermaine defeated The Brooklyn Brawler by pinfall	Singles match	—
2	Jeff Jarrett (with The Roadie) defeated Razor Ramon (c) by pinfall	Singles match for the WWF Intercontinental Championship	18:06
3	The Undertaker (with Paul Bearer) defeated Irwin R. Schyster (with Ted DiBiase) by pinfall	Singles match	12:21
4	Diesel (c) vs. Bret Hart ended in a draw	Singles match for the WWF Championship	27:19
5	The 1–2–3 Kid and Bob Holly defeated The Million Dollar Corporation (Bam Bam Bigelow and Tatanka) (with Ted DiBiase) by pinfall	Tag team tournament final for the vacant WWF Tag Team Championship	15:32
6	Shawn Michaels won by last eliminating The British Bulldog	30-man Royal Rumble match for a WWF Championship match at WrestleMania XI	38:41
(c) / – the champion(s) heading into the match; D / – this was a dark match

=== WWF Tag Team Championship Tournament bracket ===
Quarterfinals; Superstars; November 29 – December 14, 1994 (Aired: December 17, 1994 – January 7, 1995)
Million Dollar Corporation (Bam Bam Bigelow and Tatanka)	Pinfall
Men on a Mission (Mabel and Mo)	9:35
The Headshrinkers (Fatu and Sione)	Pinfall
Owen Hart and Jim Neidhart	9:10
The Heavenly Bodies (Jimmy Del Ray and Tom Prichard)	Pinfall
The Bushwhackers (Bushwhacker Butch and Bushwhacker Luke)	2:35
The 1–2–3 Kid and Bob Holly	Pinfall
Well Dunn (Steven Dunn and Timothy Well)	6:52

Semifinals; Superstars; December 14, 1994 (Aired: January 14, 1995)
Million Dollar Corporation (Bam Bam Bigelow and Tatanka)	Pinfall
The Headshrinkers (Fatu and Sione)	5:47
The Heavenly Bodies (Jimmy Del Ray and Tom Prichard)	6:01
The 1–2–3 Kid and Bob Holly	Pinfall

Final; Royal Rumble; January 22, 1995
Million Dollar Corporation (Bam Bam Bigelow and Tatanka)	15:32
The 1–2–3 Kid and Bob Holly	Pinfall

=== Royal Rumble entrances and eliminations ===
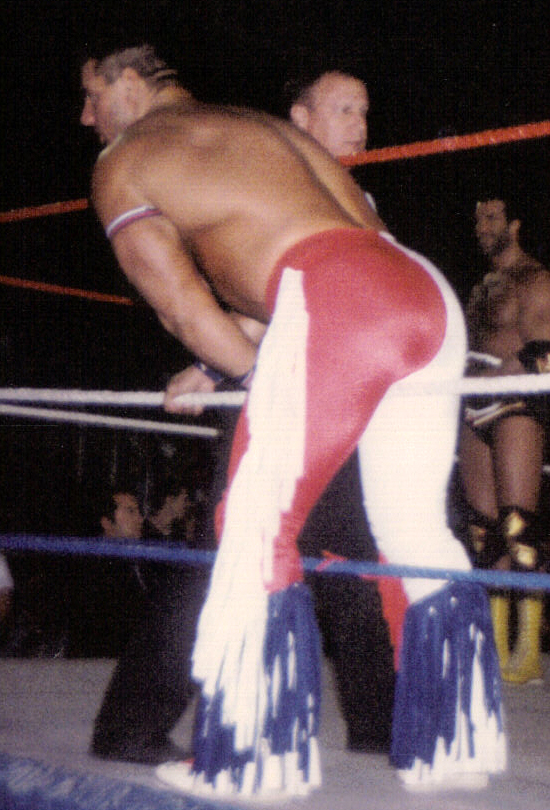
"British Bulldog" Davey Boy Smith was the last wrestler eliminated from the Royal Rumble match.

A new entrant came out approximately every minute.

– Winner

Draw	Entrant	Order	Eliminated by	Time	Eliminations
1	Shawn Michaels	-	Winner	38:41	8
2	The British Bulldog	29	Shawn Michaels	38:41	4
3	Eli Blu	9	Sione	09:56	1
4	Duke Droese	3	Shawn Michaels	08:13	0
5	Jimmy Del Ray	1	The British Bulldog	01:25	0
6	Sione	10	Eli Blu	06:55	3
7	Tom Prichard	6	Shawn Michaels	05:30	0
8	Doink the Clown	7	Kwang	04:50	0
9	Kwang	8	Sione	04:01	1
10	Rick Martel	5	Sione	02:29	0
11	Owen Hart	2	The British Bulldog	00:03	0
12	Timothy Well	4	The British Bulldog	00:23	0
13	Bushwhacker Luke	11	Shawn Michaels	00:12	0
14	Jacob Blu	12	Shawn Michaels	00:17	0
15	King Kong Bundy	14	Mabel	03:00	1
16	Mo	13	King Kong Bundy	00:03	0
17	Mabel	16	Lex Luger	01:58	1
18	Bushwhacker Butch	15	Shawn Michaels	00:19	0
19	Lex Luger	27	Crush and Shawn Michaels	18:51	4
20	Mantaur	18	Lex Luger	09:33	0
21	Aldo Montoya	23	Shawn Michaels	13:21	1
22	Henry O. Godwinn	26	Lex Luger	14:40	1
23	Billy Gunn	20	Crush and Dick Murdoch	07:25	0
24	Bart Gunn	19	Crush and Dick Murdoch	06:19	0
25	Bob Backlund	17	Lex Luger	00:16	0
26	Steven Dunn	21	Aldo Montoya	04:29	0
27	Dick Murdoch	25	Henry O. Godwinn	05:08	2
28	Adam Bomb	22	Crush	05:20	0
29	Fatu	24	Crush	05:32	0
30	Crush	28	The British Bulldog	08:51	5
