= Survivor Series (1994) =

World Wrestling Federation pay-per-view event

- Promotional poster featuring The Undertaker
- Promotion: World Wrestling Federation
- Date: November 23, 1994
- City: San Antonio, Texas
- Venue: Freeman Coliseum
- Attendance: 10,000
- Tagline: "It's Time to Meet Your Maker..."

Pay-per-view chronology
← Previous; SummerSlam	Next → Royal Rumble

Survivor Series chronology
← Previous; 1993	Next → 1995

The 1994 Survivor Series was a professional wrestling pay-per-view (PPV) event produced by the World Wrestling Federation (WWF, renamed WWE in 2002). It was the eighth annual Survivor Series event and took place on Thanksgiving Eve in the United States on Wednesday, November 23, 1994, at the Freeman Coliseum in San Antonio, Texas. This was the final edition of Survivor Series to be held on either the eve or day of Thanksgiving itself, with subsequent events held one to two weeks before the holiday or the weekend after. The event centered on the Survivor Series match, a tag team elimination match that pits teams of multiple wrestlers against each other.

The pay-per-view broadcast consisted of five matches, and there was also one dark match before the event aired live. Two main event matches were held; in the first, Bret Hart defended the WWF Championship against Bob Backlund in a submission match where the only way for a wrestler to win was to have the opponent's second throw a towel into the ring; Owen Hart, Bret's brother and Backlund's second, tricked his mother Helen Hart into throwing in the towel for Bret, which won the match and the championship for Backlund. In the other main event, The Undertaker defeated Yokozuna in a casket match with Chuck Norris as the special guest ring enforcer.

The event's other three matches were Survivor Series matches. Razor Ramon led The Bad Guys against Diesel's team of The Teamsters. Ramon won the match for his team after all members of the other team were counted out. Doink the Clown teamed with three midgets to form Clowns Are Us in a match against The Royal Family, composed of Jerry Lawler and three midgets. The Royal Family won the match, but all seven other competitors attacked Lawler after the match. Lex Luger led Guts and Glory against the Million Dollar Corporation team, which was managed by Ted DiBiase. DiBiase's team won after Luger, the last wrestler from his team, was pinned.

Shawn Michaels and Diesel, the WWF Tag Team Champions going into the event, began feuding after Michaels accidentally kicked Diesel during the match. They vacated their title and began a feud that led to a match at WrestleMania XI. Three days after Survivor Series, Diesel won the WWF Championship by defeating Backlund. The rivalry between Backlund and Bret Hart continued until they faced each other at WrestleMania XI.

== Production ==
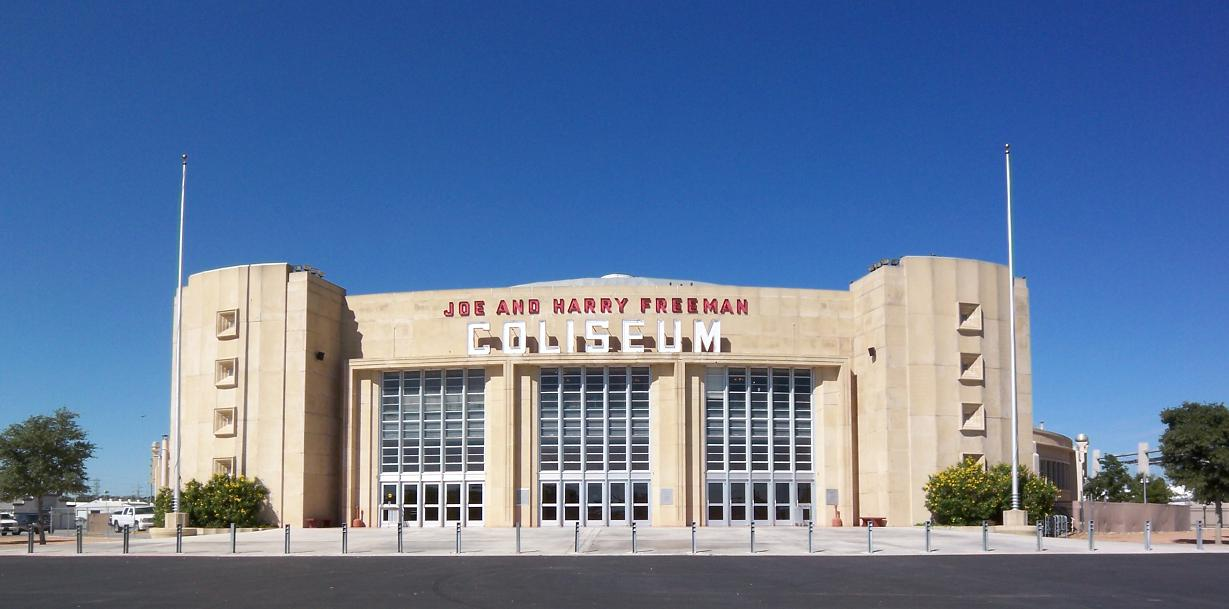
The eighth annual Survivor Series event was held at the Freeman Coliseum in San Antonio, Texas.

=== Background ===
Survivor Series is an annual professional wrestling pay-per-view (PPV) event, produced every November by the World Wrestling Federation (WWF, renamed WWE in 2002) since 1987, held around Thanksgiving in the United States. In what has become the second longest running PPV event in history (behind WWE's WrestleMania), it is one of the promotion's original four PPVs, along with WrestleMania, SummerSlam, and Royal Rumble, referred to as the "Big Four", and was considered one of the "Big Five" PPVs with the addition of King of the Ring in 1993. The event is traditionally characterized by having Survivor Series matches, which are tag team elimination matches that typically pits teams of four or five wrestlers against each other. Like the prior three years, the eighth Survivor Series event was scheduled to be held on Thanksgiving Eve on Wednesday, November 23, 1994, taking place at the Freeman Coliseum in San Antonio, Texas.

=== Storylines ===
Several storylines formed the background for the opening match, which saw the fan favorite team of The Bad Guys (Razor Ramon, the 1-2-3 Kid, Davey Boy Smith, and The Headshrinkers) square off against the villainous team of The Teamsters (Shawn Michaels, Diesel, Jeff Jarrett, Owen Hart and Jim Neidhart). Razor Ramon had been feuding with Shawn Michaels since September 1993 when Ramon won the WWF Intercontinental Championship. Michaels, the former champion, had been stripped of the belt. WWF President Jack Tunney scheduled a battle royal, in which Ramon and Rick Martel were the final participants remaining. They faced each other on Monday Night Raw, and Ramon won the match and was awarded the title. Michaels claimed that he was the rightful holder of the belt and refused to acknowledge Ramon as the champion. Diesel was serving as Michaels' bodyguard but soon became an active wrestler and carried on Michaels' feud with Ramon. In the months leading up to Survivor Series, Ramon had also developed a feud with Jeff Jarrett, and the two faced each other several times with the Intercontinental Championship on the line. Ramon's friend, the 1-2-3 Kid, took Ramon's side in these feuds, and the two formed an occasional tag team. The Headshrinkers had also been feuding with Michaels and Diesel since dropping the WWF Tag Team Championship to them on August 28. The Headshrinkers had several rematches but were unable to regain the belts. Finally, Davey Boy Smith was involved in a feud with his real-life brother-in-law Owen Hart and Hart's other brother-in-law, Jim Neidhart. Owen Hart had turned on his brother Bret at the 1994 Royal Rumble, after which Smith got involved on Bret's side and Neidhart took Owen's side.

Although Jerry Lawler and Doink the Clown (Matt Osborne) had a storyline rivalry that dated back to when Doink turned on Lawler by dumping a bucket of water on him after SummerSlam 1993, the feud had rarely been mentioned since then. On the September 10, 1994 episode of WWF Superstars of Wrestling, however, Lawler provoked Doink by popping balloons carried by Doink's midget sidekick Dink. The rivalry soon led to Lawler introducing a midget named Queasy, who dressed like Lawler. Doink and Lawler then introduced many more midgets over the following weeks. An elimination match was booked for Survivor Series, with Lawler, Queasy, Sleazy and Cheesy facing Doink, Dink, Wink and Pink.

Bret Hart and Bob Backlund's rivalry stemmed from a match the two men had on the July 30 edition of Superstars for Hart's WWF Championship. Despite Backlund's best efforts to regain the title he had held for over five years, Hart emerged victorious. However, when Hart tried to shake Backlund's hand after the match, Backlund slapped him in the face and locked him in a crossface chickenwing, refusing to let go until he was finally pulled off of the champion. Once Hart was freed, Backlund stared at his hands in apparent shock at what he had just done..

Shortly after the incident, Backlund appeared on Monday Night Raw to explain his actions. He claimed that he had never truly been beaten for the WWF World Heavyweight Championship on December 26, 1983, as the match ended when his manager, Arnold Skaaland, threw a towel into the ring rather than allowing Backlund to submit to The Iron Sheik's camel clutch; he also demanded that everyone start referring to him as "Mr. Backlund" and that if anyone was able to break out of the crossface chickenwing, he would retire.

Backlund and Hart signed for a rematch at Survivor Series. The match was a non-traditional submission match; the only way for the other competitor to win was to force the opponent to throw in the towel. This would require both champion and challenger to have a second accompany them to the ring. Hart chose Davey Boy Smith, while Owen Hart agreed to be in Backlund's corner.

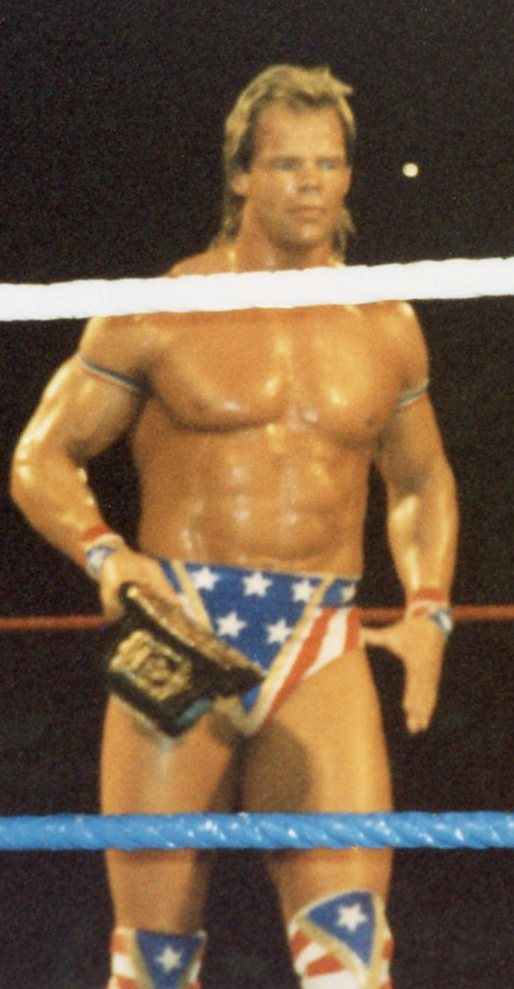
Lex Luger feuded with the Million Dollar Corporation leading in to Survivor Series.

The central feud in the match between Guts & Glory and The Million Dollar Team was between Lex Luger and Ted DiBiase's Million Dollar Corporation. During 1994, DiBiase had "purchased" the contracts of several wrestlers to form a heel stable. Among the members to join were Bam Bam Bigelow and King Kong Bundy. Prior to SummerSlam 1994, DiBiase claimed to have added Luger to the group. Luger denied having joined, despite Tatanka claiming that he had evidence that Luger had "sold out" to DiBiase. Luger and Tatanka faced each other at SummerSlam, where it was revealed that the storyline was a swerve, as Tatanka turned on Luger to join the Million Dollar Corporation. Bigelow and Adam Bomb had also been feuding since the September 10, 1994 episode of Superstars of Wrestling. Bigelow attacked his opponent, a jobber, before the match. DiBiase then claimed that the company was not providing suitable competition, and he challenged any wrestler to face Bigelow. Bomb responded, and the two brawled briefly. Leading up to Survivor Series, Bomb and Bigelow faced each other at several house shows. The Heavenly Bodies were not members of DiBiase's stable, but they competed on behalf of the group. At the time, they were involved in a feud with The Smoking Gunns as a result of a match on the September 3 episode of Superstars of Wrestling. The Heavenly Bodies attacked the Gunns prior to the match and stole the Gunns' cowboy hats. They put on the hats to mock the Gunns and then threw them on the ground and stomped on them. To get revenge, the Gunns stole The Heavenly Bodies' ring robes and tore the wings off them.

The feud between The Undertaker and Yokozuna began at Survivor Series 1993. During an elimination match, Yokozuna was unable to injure The Undertaker, despite slamming The Undertaker's head into the ring steps and performing the Banzai drop on him. A match was booked for Royal Rumble 1994, in which The Undertaker would challenge WWF World Heavyweight Champion Yokozuna for the title in a Casket match. During the match, which featured a no-disqualification clause, Mr. Fuji, Yokozuna's manager, hired nine other wrestlers to interfere on Yokozuna's behalf. Yokozuna won the match after opening The Undertaker's urn, which, according to the storyline, contained the secret to The Undertaker's powers. After the match, The Undertaker appeared on the video screen and vowed to return to the World Wrestling Federation one day. He was not seen for several months, although, in reality, he was taking time off wrestling to allow injuries to heal. The Undertaker returned at SummerSlam 1994, defeating an Undertaker look-alike. A rematch against Yokozuna was scheduled for Survivor Series. This was also to be a Casket match, but Chuck Norris was brought in as a special outside referee to prevent interference.

== Event ==
Other on-screen personnel
Role:	Name:
Commentator	Vince McMahon
Commentator	Gorilla Monsoon
Interviewer	Todd Pettengill
Ring announcer	Howard Finkel
Referee	Mike Chioda
Referee	Danny Davis
Referee	Jack Doan
Referee	Earl Hebner

The first match of the event saw The Bad Guys, which consisted of Razor Ramon, the 1-2-3 Kid, the British Bulldog, and The Headshrinkers (Sione and Fatu) versus The Teamsters, composed of Diesel, Shawn Michaels, Jeff Jarrett, Owen Hart, and Jim Neidhart. The opening minutes of the match featured brothers-in-law Hart and Smith trading moves as well as Jarrett and Ramon brawling. Fatu became the first wrestler eliminated after Diesel performed a Jackknife powerbomb on him. Diesel eliminated the 1-2-3 Kid forty-two seconds later after another Jackknife powerbomb. Sione followed thirty-one seconds later after being pinned by Diesel. Davey Boy Smith entered the ring, but Diesel soon knocked him between the ropes to the arena floor. Hart and Neidhart prevented Smith from getting back in the ring, and Smith was eliminated after the referee counted him out. Razor Ramon was left as the only member of his team to face the five members of The Teamsters. He fought with Diesel for several minutes, but Diesel then performed the Jackknife powerbomb on him and prepared to pin him for the victory. Michaels insisted on having Diesel hold Ramon while Michaels performed a superkick on their opponent. Ramon dodged the kick, and Michaels kicked Diesel in the face. Diesel became angry at Michaels, particularly because the same mistake had cost Diesel the Intercontinental Championship at SummerSlam. He and Michaels argued outside the ring while the rest of the team attempted to calm them down. The referee counted all five wrestlers out of the ring and declared Razor Ramon the winner of the match. Shawn Michaels was shown backstage after the match, and he stated that he was disbanding his tag team with Diesel and vacating the Tag Team Championship. He then got into a car and drove away from the arena.

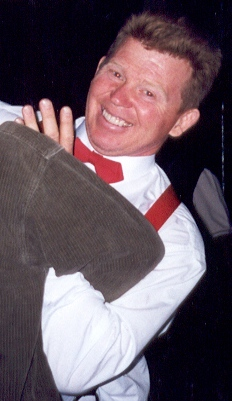
Bob Backlund won his second WWF World Heavyweight Championship by defeating Bret Hart.

The next match was between Jerry Lawler's team, known as The Royal Family (with Queasy, Sleazy, and Cheesy), and Doink's Clowns Are Us team (with Dink, Wink, and Pink). The rules were that only midgets could fight midgets and that neither Lawler nor Doink was allowed to attack the midgets. The match consisted of comedic action for much of the first ten minutes. Eventually, Doink attempted a crossbody, but Lawler reversed the move. until Lawler was able to pin Doink and eliminate him from the match. Lawler remained involved in the match and played a role in the elimination of two more members of Doink's team. When Wink attempted a monkey flip against Queasy, Lawler blocked the move and helped Queasy to pin Wink. Later in the match, Lawler threw Cheesy on top of Pink, which enabled Cheesy to eliminate another of Doink's teammates. After Wink and Pink were eliminated, however, they hid under the ring rather than returning backstage. The final member of Clowns Are Us was eliminated after Sleazy and Dink fought in the ring. Dink performed a crossbody on Sleazy and attempted to pin him. Queasy rolled the wrestlers over so that Sleazy was on top, however, and the referee made the three count and awarded the match to The Royal Family. As Queasy, Sleazy and Cheesy celebrated after the match, Lawler criticized them for taking credit for the victory. Dink, Pink, and Wink emerged from under the ring. All six midgets turned against Lawler and chased him away from the ring. As Lawler tried to escape, Doink returned and hit him in the face with a pie.

The next match was the submission match between champion Bret Hart and challenger Bob Backlund, with the aforementioned stipulation being that the only way to win the match was to have the opposing cornerman (either Owen Hart or Davey Boy Smith) throw in the towel. Bret got the early advantage and wore down Backlund using head locks, but Backlund broke free and attempted a crossface chickenwing on Bret. Bret escaped, but Backlund maintained the advantage by attacking Bret's arm and attempting another crossface chickenwing. Bret used a figure four leglock on Backlund, but Backlund got out of the hold. Bret then applied the Sharpshooter, his signature hold, on Backlund. Owen entered the ring and clotheslined Bret from behind, causing him to break the hold. Smith then chased Owen around the ring, but fell and was kayfabe knocked unconscious on the ring steps. While Bret was distracted, Backlund applied the crossface chickenwing and held onto it for an extended period of time. Owen, watching on and feigning concern for his brother, went to talk to their parents, Stu and Helen Hart, who were sitting at ringside. Owen begged for one of them to throw Bret's towel in to stop the match, claiming that things had gone too far in their rivalry. Stu, suspecting Owen was up to no good, refused to listen to his son and grabbed the towel from Owen. However, after seeing Bret locked for over nine minutes in the crossface chickenwing, Helen had seen enough; she grabbed the towel from her husband and threw it into the ring. Once the referee saw the towel, the match was stopped and the victory and WWF Championship were awarded to Backlund while Owen revealed the ruse by running backstage with the towel raised over his head trimumphantly. After the match, Owen claimed he would have the best Thanksgiving ever after finally costing Bret the world championship, while Backlund said the win made him “feel like God”.

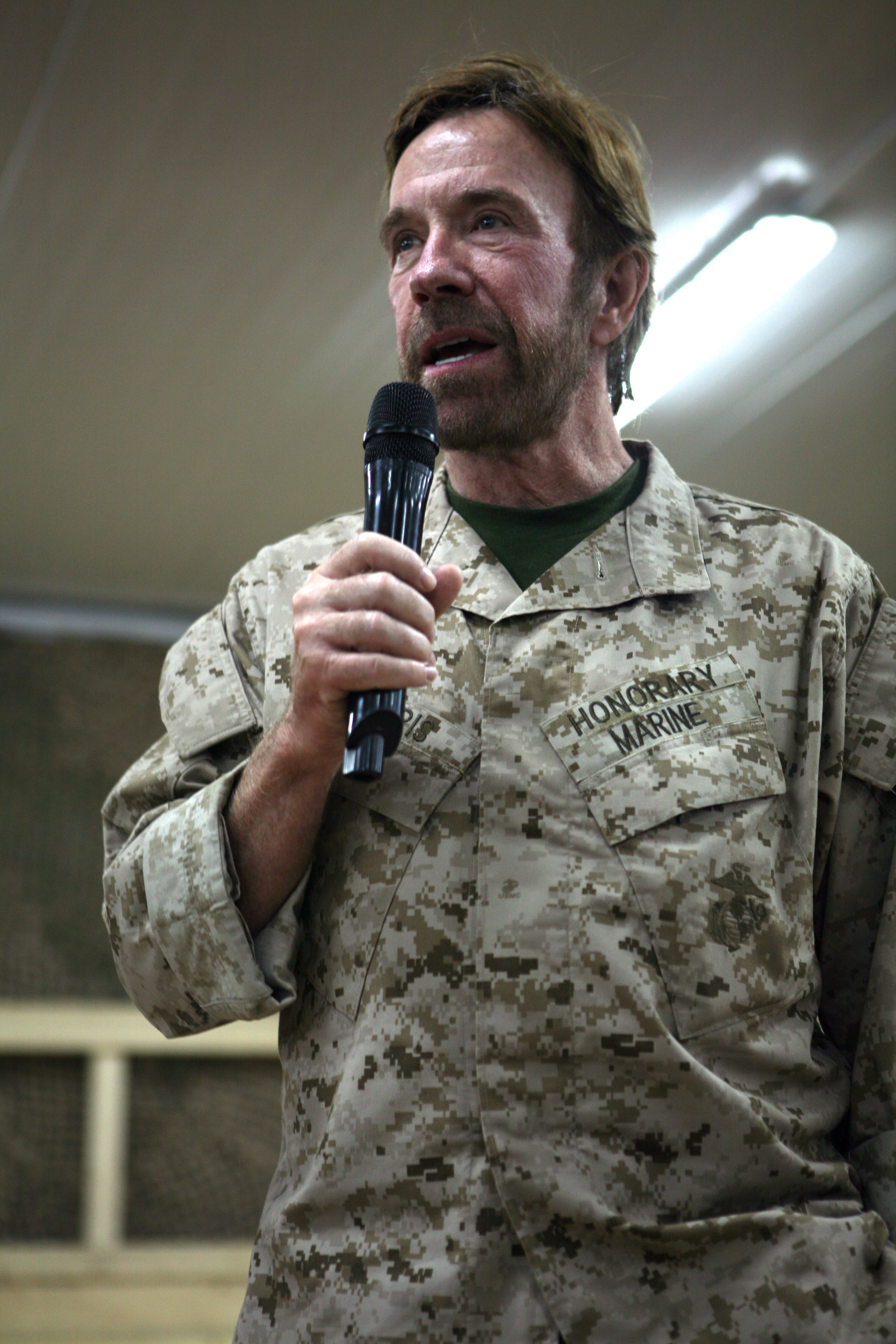
Chuck Norris was the special outside referee for the match between The Undertaker and Yokozuna.

The team of Guts and Glory, consisting of Lex Luger, Adam Bomb, Mabel, and The Smoking Gunns (Billy Gunn and Bart Gunn), faced The Million Dollar Team, made up of Tatanka, Bam Bam Bigelow, King Kong Bundy, and The Heavenly Bodies (Tom Prichard and Jimmy Del Ray) in the next match. Guts and Glory took the early lead when Mabel pinned Prichard after performing a crossbody from the second rope. Mabel fought Bundy and Bigelow, but he was counted out after clotheslining Bigelow out of the ring. Bigelow then performed a moonsault on Bomb and got a pinfall. Luger and Del Ray fought back and forth until Luger performed a running forearm smash on Del Ray to get the pinfall. The Smoking Gunns were eliminated next, as Tatanka pinned Bart and Bundy pinned Billy. Luger fought back by pinning Tatanka with a small package. Seven seconds later, Bundy pinned Luger after performing a splash to get the victory. Bundy, Bigelow, and Tatanka continued to attack Luger after the match until Luger's team returned to the ring to save him.

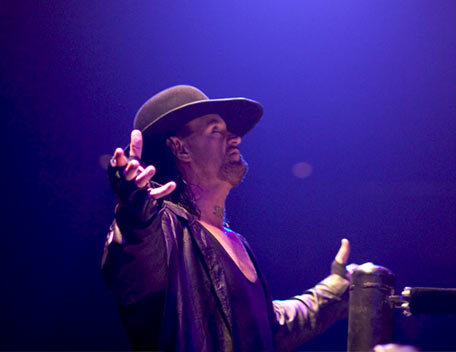
The Undertaker defeated Yokozuna in a casket match

The main event was next, featuring The Undertaker versus Yokozuna in a casket match with Chuck Norris as the special outside referee. The Undertaker gained the early advantage, but Yokozuna reversed the momentum with a Samoan drop. He tried to put The Undertaker in the casket, but The Undertaker fought back. Yokozuna next performed a leg drop and placed The Undertaker in the casket. Before Yokozuna could close the lid, however, The Undertaker attacked him and the two wrestlers fought while standing in the casket. During the scuffle inside the casket, Mr. Fuji tried to interfere by grabbing the Undertaker from the back of his hair but he turned around, stalked Fuji and grabbed him with both hands on his throat. Cornette attempted to interfere as well, but he was struck down by the Undertaker. The Undertaker performed a clothesline from the top rope and placed Yokozuna in the casket. King Kong Bundy and Bam Bam Bigelow came down the aisle toward the ring, but Chuck Norris blocked their path. While Norris was distracted, however, Irwin R. Schyster entered the ring from the other side and attacked The Undertaker. He placed The Undertaker in the casket, but The Undertaker recovered before Yokozuna could close the lid. Jeff Jarrett tried to interfere on Yokozuna's behalf, but Norris stopped him with a superkick. The Undertaker performed a DDT and a big boot on Yokozuna, who fell through the ropes and into the casket. Undertaker then snatched the Japanese flag from Fuji's hand, and snapped in two, and slammed the lid to gain the victory.

== Aftermath ==
Shortly after Survivor Series, Diesel was named the top contender to Backlund's title. Backlund's first defense of his title was made at a Madison Square Garden live show three days after Survivor Series, where Diesel defeated him with the Jackknife Powerbomb in eight seconds. With the victory, Diesel joined Hart and Pedro Morales as the only wrestlers to that point to be Triple Crown Champion and became the quickest to do so having won all three components within the span of seven months. This record was broken by CM Punk in 2009.

Hart returned at the Royal Rumble in January 1995, where he faced Diesel to try to regain his title. Backlund interfered in the match, restarting the rivalry and leading to an I Quit match at WrestleMania XI. Hart won the match by using the crossface chickenwing to make Backlund concede defeat.

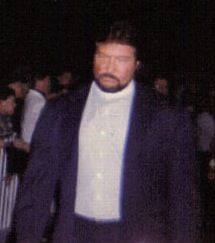
Ted DiBiase's Million Dollar Corporation spent much of 1995 feuding with The Undertaker.

To fill the vacancy created when Diesel and Michaels broke up, an eight team tournament was announced with the finals scheduled for the Royal Rumble. The 1-2-3 Kid and Bob Holly won the tournament by defeating Tatanka and Bam Bam Bigelow (The Million Dollar Corporation) and won the titles but dropped the belts the following night to The Smoking Gunns.

Michaels and Diesel's feud resumed at the Royal Rumble when Michaels attacked Diesel during his match with Hart. Michaels then became the top contender for the WWF World Heavyweight Championship by winning the 1995 Royal Rumble match. Diesel won their match at WrestleMania after Sid, Michaels' new bodyguard, accidentally distracted the referee. Diesel offered Michaels a rematch, and Michaels told Sid that his services would not be required during the rematch. Sid attacked Michaels, and Diesel came to Michaels' defense. This attack caused Michaels to turn face, and he and Diesel resumed their friendship and won the WWF Tag Team Championship later in 1995.

Lex Luger's feud with the Million Dollar Corporation did not continue, as the Corporation targeted The Undertaker. The Undertaker spent most of the following year feuding with the Corporation, as he faced IRS at the 1995 Royal Rumble, King Kong Bundy at WrestleMania XI, and Kama at SummerSlam 1995. Luger was placed in a tag team with Davey Boy Smith known as The Allied Powers, but the team never won the tag team titles. The team was dissolved in the summer of 1995 after Smith turned heel and Luger left the company following SummerSlam to return to World Championship Wrestling.

Yokozuna did not regain his main event status after Survivor Series. After taking some time off, he made a surprise return at WrestleMania XI as Owen Hart's partner in a tag team title match against the Smoking Gunns. Yokozuna and Hart won the WWF Tag Team Championship, and Owen's feud with Bret was dropped. The brothers eventually reunited in 1997 to form The Hart Foundation, a stable that also included Davey Boy Smith and Jim Neidhart.

== Results ==
No.	Results	Stipulations	Times
1^{D}	Bob Holly defeated Kwang (with Harvey Wippleman)	Singles match	—
2	The Bad Guys (Razor Ramon, 1-2-3 Kid, The British Bulldog, Fatu, and Sione) (with Afa and Lou Albano) defeated The Teamsters (Diesel, Jeff Jarrett, Jim Neidhart, Owen Hart, and Shawn Michaels)	5-on-5 Survivor Series match^{1}	21:45
3	The Royal Family (Jerry Lawler, Cheesy, Queasy, and Sleazy) defeated Clowns Are Us (Doink the Clown, Dink the Clown, Pink the Clown, and Wink the Clown)	4-on-4 Survivor Series match^{2}	16:05
4	Bob Backlund (with Owen Hart) defeated Bret Hart (c) (with The British Bulldog) when Helen Hart threw Bret's towel into the ring	Throw in the Towel match for the WWF Championship	35:11
5	The Million Dollar Team (Bam Bam Bigelow, Jimmy Del Ray, King Kong Bundy, Tatanka, and Tom Prichard) (with Jim Cornette and Ted DiBiase) defeated Guts and Glory (Adam Bomb, Bart Gunn, Billy Gunn, Lex Luger, and Mabel) (with Oscar)	5-on-5 Survivor Series match^{3}	23:21
6	The Undertaker (with Paul Bearer) defeated Yokozuna (with Jim Cornette and Mr. Fuji) by putting Yokozuna in the casket with the lid completely shut	Casket match Chuck Norris was the special outside enforcer.	15:24
(c) / – the champion(s) heading into the match; D / – this was a dark match

=== Survivor Series matches ===
^1

Eliminated	Wrestler	Eliminated by	Method	Time
1	Fatu	Diesel	Pinfall	13:31
2	The 1-2-3 Kid	Diesel	Pinfall	14:13
3	Sione	Diesel	Pinfall	14:44
4	The British Bulldog	N/A	Countout	15:58
5	Diesel	N/A	Countout	21:45
6	Jeff Jarrett	N/A	Countout	21:45
7	Jim Neidhart	N/A	Countout	21:45
8	Owen Hart	N/A	Countout	21:45
9	Shawn Michaels	N/A	Countout	21:45
Sole Survivor:	Razor Ramon (The Bad Guys)			

^2

Eliminated	Wrestler	Eliminated by	Method	Time
1	Doink the Clown	Jerry Lawler	Pinfall	10:36
2	Wink the Clown	Cheesy	Pinfall	13:10
3	Pink the Clown	Cheesy	Pinfall	14:28
4	Dink the Clown	Sleazy	Pinfall	16:05
Survivors:	Cheesy, Jerry Lawler, Sleazy and Queasy (clean sweep)			

^3

Eliminated	Wrestler	Eliminated by	Method	Time
1	Tom Prichard	Mabel	Pinfall	3:58
2	Mabel	N/A	Countout	7:15
3	Adam Bomb	Bam Bam Bigelow	Pinfall	8:09
4	Jimmy Del Ray	Lex Luger	Pinfall	9:56
5	Bart Gunn	Tatanka	Pinfall	13:27
6	Billy Gunn	King Kong Bundy	Pinfall	16:14
7	Tatanka	Lex Luger	Pinfall	23:14
8	Lex Luger	King Kong Bundy	Pinfall	23:21
Survivors:	Bam Bam Bigelow and King Kong Bundy (The Million Dollar Team)			
