= Million Dollar Corporation =

Professional wrestling stable

Stable
- Members: See below
- Debut: May 16, 1994
- Disbanded: May 28, 1996
- Years active: 1994-1996

The Million Dollar Corporation was a professional wrestling stable in the World Wrestling Federation (WWF) from April 1994 to May 1996 and was led and managed by the "Million Dollar Man" Ted DiBiase. DiBiase had retired from active competition after a back injury in a match for All Japan Pro Wrestling in late 1993 and was brought back by the WWF as a manager.

== History ==
=== Beginning (1994) ===
The group's foundation was laid on the May 16, 1994 episode of Monday Night Raw when Ted DiBiase announced that he had purchased the services of Nikolai Volkoff. Volkoff, as a result of the collapse of the Soviet Union, had fallen on hard times, and DiBiase took advantage by forcing him to be his servant in order for Volkoff to provide for his family. This included Volkoff wearing a tuxedo T-shirt as well as trunks that read "Property of the Million Dollar Man" along with cent signs, as opposed to the dollar signs DiBiase had worn on his trunks. Over the next couple of months, DiBiase acquired Bam Bam Bigelow as well as former tag team partner Irwin R. Schyster (I.R.S.).

Another infamous addition was made early on, when DiBiase claimed to be bringing The Undertaker back to the WWF after a long absence. On the June 11 episode of Superstars a man looking and sounding like The Undertaker was produced by DiBiase. Initially, announcers accepted DiBiase's claim, but eventually his man (wrestler Brian Lee) was revealed to be a doppelgänger. After a main event showdown with "the real Undertaker" at SummerSlam 1994, the Million Dollar Man's version was not seen again.

Also at SummerSlam 1994, the Corporation gained another member. For weeks, the WWF had teased a heel turn by Lex Luger as DiBiase's men constantly interfered in matches on his behalf and offered him bribes to join the stable. His tag team partner at the time, Tatanka, became suspicious and challenged him to a match, only to turn and join himself after DiBiase distracted Luger to set up the pin.

King Kong Bundy joined the group in October. At the 1994 Survivor Series, Corporation members Bundy, Bigelow and Tatanka teamed with The Heavenly Bodies to defeat a team captained by Lex Luger in an elimination tag team match.

=== Expansion (1995–1996) ===
Bam Bam Bigelow teamed with Tatanka to challenge for the WWF Tag Team Championship. After the team's loss in a tournament final to determine new champions, Bigelow became involved in a worked altercation with football legend Lawrence Taylor at ringside. The two squared off in the main event of WrestleMania XI, where Taylor was victorious. After his loss to Taylor, relations soured between Bigelow and DiBiase, cooling for months until the former turned face and saved then-WWF Champion Diesel from a beating at the hands of the corporation.

Throughout 1995, the Corporation continued to feud with the WWF's top faces, including The Undertaker, Luger, Diesel, and Razor Ramon. To help fight off The Undertaker, DiBiase recruited Kama, who stole The Undertaker's urn and had it melted down into a gold chain for himself. In a memorable series of skits, IRS traveled to a graveyard in order to "leave no stone unturned" in his investigation of dead tax cheats, and to psych out The Undertaker. Undertaker would defeat IRS at the Royal Rumble and then King Kong Bundy at WrestleMania XI.

DiBiase added Sycho Sid after Sid turned on Shawn Michaels following WrestleMania XI, and later added The 1-2-3 Kid during Sid's feud with Razor Ramon. However, one by one the Million Dollar Corporation began to disband as its members found themselves out of work. Bundy and IRS left the WWF in 1995, while Kama and Tatanka lasted until early 1996. The 1-2-3 Kid lasted until May 1996, later being fired and departing for WCW where he would join the nWo. Sid, meanwhile, left the company at the end of 1995 claiming a neck injury and would not return until the following July. During the 1995 Christmas season, DiBiase added Xanta Klaus, a twisted take on Santa Claus, who hailed from the South Pole and reveled in taking from people rather than giving. However, the character lasted only a few appearances before being dropped.

=== Steve Austin (1995–1996) ===
DiBiase, with nobody left to manage, was paired with former WCW star Steve Austin, who was given the name "The Ringmaster" and awarded the Million Dollar Championship by DiBiase, who also taught Austin his finishing move, the Million Dollar Dream. Although "The Ringmaster" name was dropped quickly and Austin adopted the "Stone Cold" moniker he later made famous, he continued to be managed by DiBiase and regarded as the Million Dollar Champion.

DiBiase managed Austin through a feud with Savio Vega, where Austin won at WrestleMania XII after a belt shot with the Million Dollar Championship. Vega and Austin had a rematch at In Your House: Beware of Dog 2 in a strap match. Per the stipulation of that match, Vega would have had to become DiBiase's chauffeur if Austin won but DiBiase would be forced to leave the company if Vega won, which he did. Austin claimed he had lost on purpose in order to rid himself of DiBiase, beginning a character transition for Austin while providing a storyline reason for DiBiase's departure; DiBiase had signed with rival promotion World Championship Wrestling shortly before this and debuted with the company later in 1996 as the financier for the nWo.

== Members ==
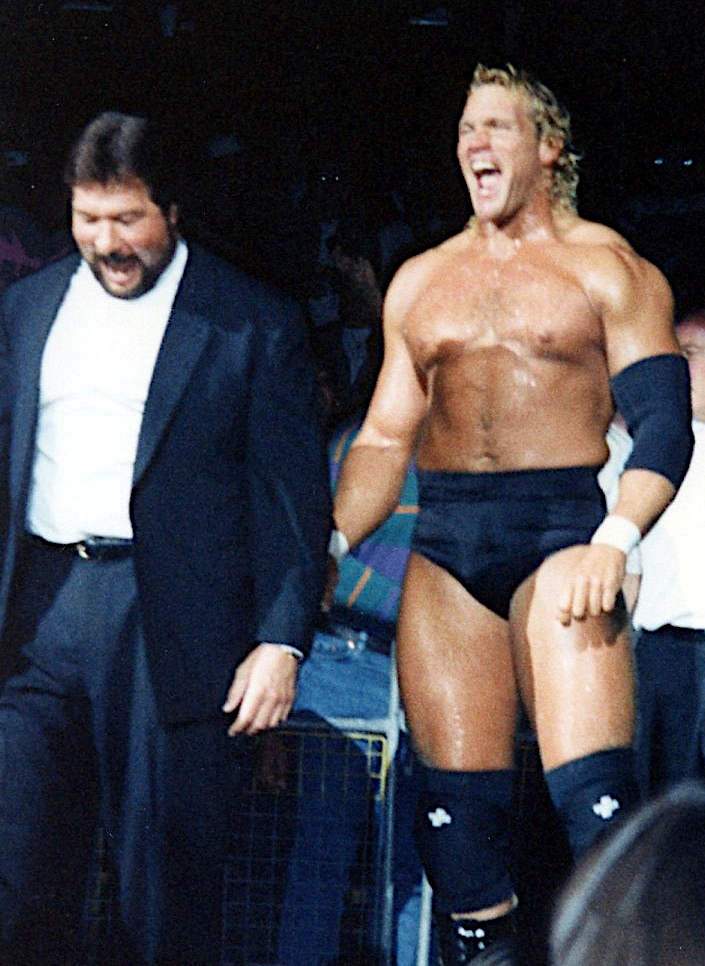
Ted DiBiase and Sycho Sid

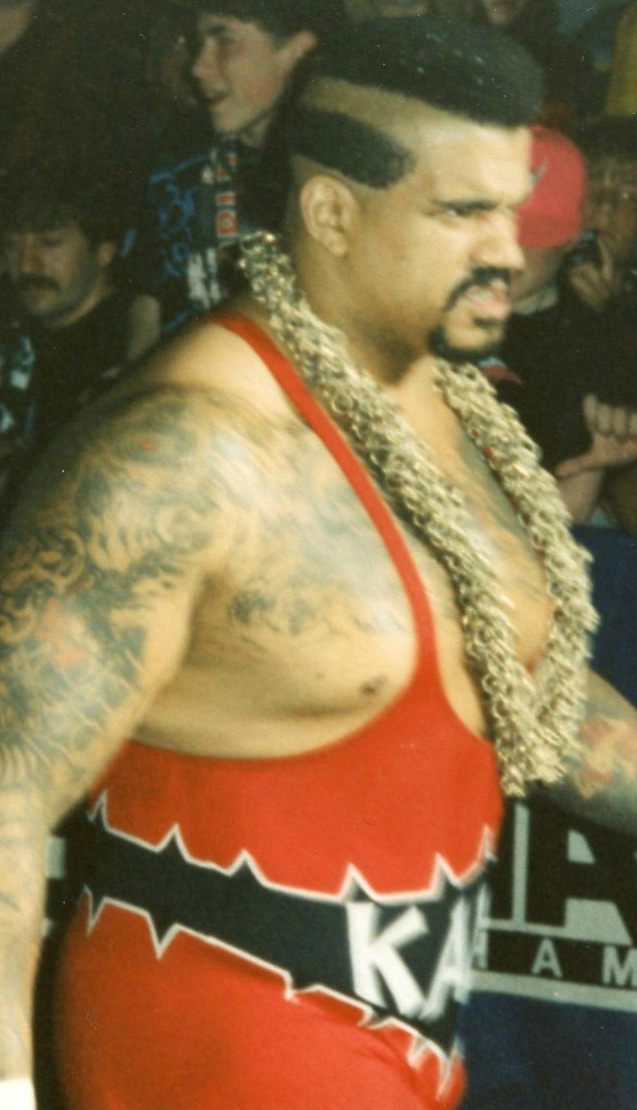
Charles Wright as "Kama" at a WWF tour in 1995

- Ted DiBiase (leader)
- Nikolai Volkoff
- Ted DiBiase's Undertaker
- Irwin R. Schyster
- Bam Bam Bigelow
- Tatanka
- Kama
- King Kong Bundy
- Sycho Sid
- 1-2-3 Kid
- Xanta Klaus
- The Ringmaster / Stone Cold Steve Austin

== Championships and accomplishments ==
- World Wrestling Federation

- Million Dollar Championship (1 time) – The Ringmaster

== See also ==
- Money Inc.
