= The Kliq =

Professional American wrestling backstage group

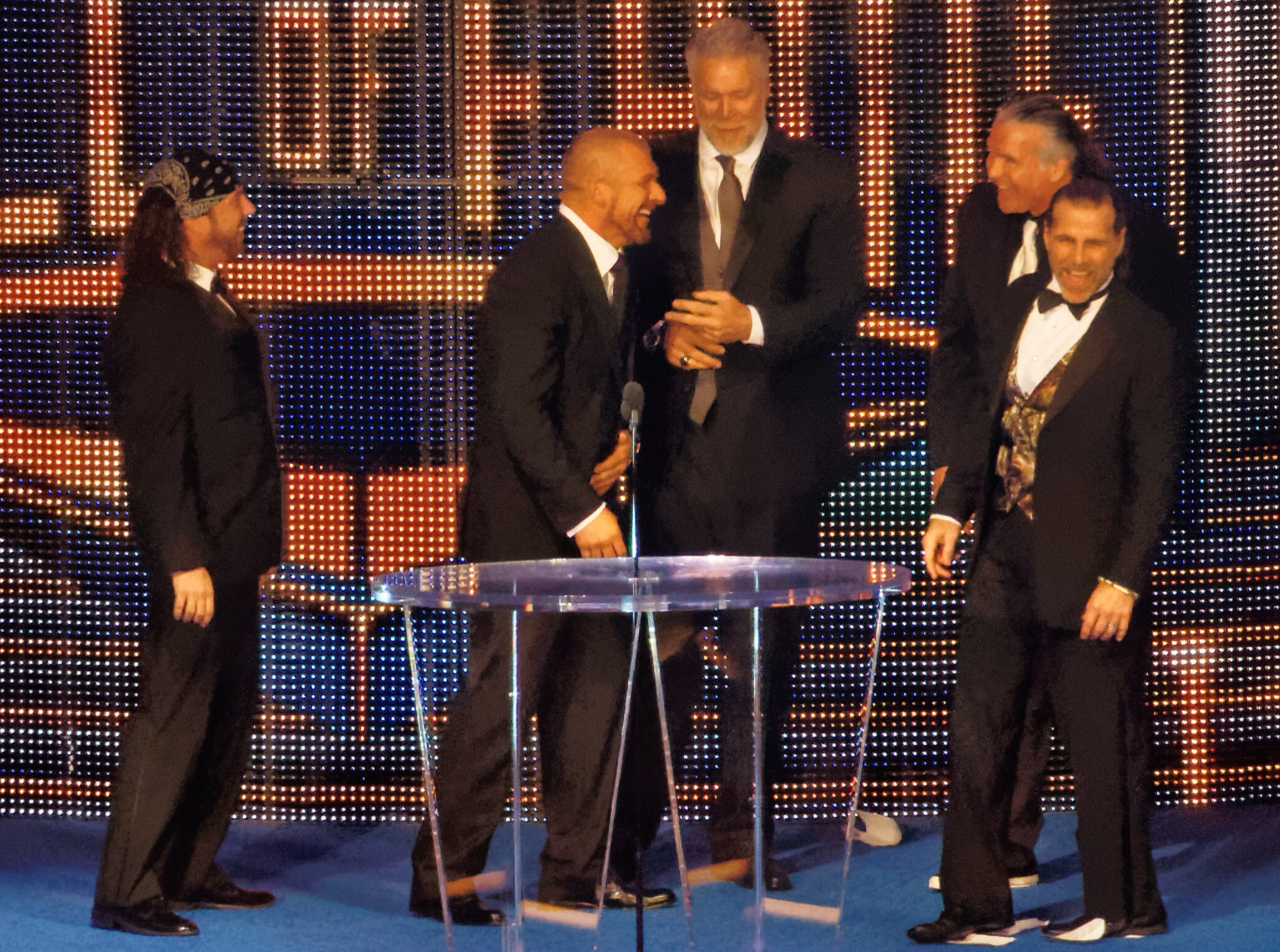
- The Kliq (from left to right: Sean Waltman, Triple H, Kevin Nash, Scott Hall, and Shawn Michaels) in 2015

Stable
- Members: Kevin Nash; Scott Hall; Sean Waltman; Shawn Michaels; Triple H
- Name: The Kliq

The Kliq was a backstage group in the World Wrestling Federation (WWF, now WWE) during the mid-1990s, composed of Kevin Nash, Scott Hall, Sean Waltman, Shawn Michaels, and Triple H. Michaels, Nash, and Hall wielded a considerable amount of power within the company at the time, which they reportedly used to positively influence one another's careers and occasionally negatively influence the careers of others.

In May 1996, The Kliq broke character at a live event at Madison Square Garden in an unscripted incident referred to as the "Curtain Call", which had far-reaching ramifications for the WWF specifically and the wrestling world as a whole. At a time when professional wrestling organizations worked to maintain the illusion of storylines and characters, the Curtain Call marked the first time that such high-profile performers had so publicly broken character, forcing the WWF and other wrestling organizations to begin acknowledging the scripted elements of their programming.

The Kliq was also the primary catalyst for two of the most well-known stables in wrestling history: the New World Order (nWo) in World Championship Wrestling (WCW) and later the WWF/E, and D-Generation X (DX) in the WWF/E. Michaels and Waltman would serve in both groups; Triple H was a member of DX, while Nash and Hall performed with the nWo. Waltman, who wrestled for both WCW and the WWF during the mid-to-late 1990s, is recognized by WWE as the only wrestler to have been "an active member of both the nWo and DX during their heydays", as Michaels only joined the nWo during their WWF/E reunion in June 2002, becoming the leader before the group disbanded in July.

== History ==
=== Formation and early history ===
The Kliq was formed in 1994 by real-life friends Scott Hall (then known as Razor Ramon), Kevin Nash (Diesel), Shawn Michaels, and Sean Waltman (1-2-3 Kid). In January 1995, Paul Levesque left WCW and arrived in the WWF as Hunter Hearst Helmsley (Triple H) and became the next member of The Kliq. Each man enjoyed a tremendous amount of popularity with fans, which allotted them a particular degree of control over their own careers. Nash, Hall, and Michaels, then among the company's most popular performers, came up with the idea of forming a backstage alliance, which would potentially allow them to consolidate even more power within the company. Bret Hart, another of the company's top performers at the time, claims in his autobiography Hitman that he was also asked if he wanted to be part of The Kliq, but declined the offer: "The thing I remember most about that tour was Shawn, Razor, and Nash talking to me in Hamburg about the idea of forming a clique of top guys who strictly took care of their own". Levesque mentioned on the 2013 Triple H – Thy Kingdom Come DVD that he was recruited to the Kliq by Kevin Nash because he didn't do drugs or alcohol, and thus could serve as the group's designated driver after events.

Michaels claims that the name "The Kliq" was originally coined by Lex Luger, due to the closeness of the five friends backstage, while Lex Luger had suggested that Davey Boy Smith created the name, because the five kept "clicking", referring to how often they talked. In a shoot interview, Scott Hall said that Bam Bam Bigelow coined the name. At the suggestion of Vince Russo, Michaels began referring to his fans as his "Kliq". Michaels wrote in his 2006 autobiography that he disliked the idea, and that it "was not a huge hit" with the fans.

In 1995, the men's growing popularity as performers led to the group developing a heavy influence on booking — the power to schedule matches and decide match outcomes, write storylines, and largely determine the trajectory of other performers' careers. The group used this power to give one another preferential treatment, usually scheduling each other in heavily promoted, high-profile matches, often against one another: during the period of 1994 through 1996 particularly, Ramon had high-profile feuds with 1-2-3 Kid, Diesel, and Michaels, while Diesel and Michaels formed a championship-winning tag-team called Two Dudes with Attitudes.

The group's perceived abuse of power led to animosity amongst other wrestlers, particularly lower-ranking members of the company. In one instance, performer Carl Ouellet, then performing as Jean-Pierre Lafitte, claimed that his scheduled defeat of Diesel was vetoed by Michaels, leading to a backstage confrontation between Ouellet and Michaels. The match between the two ended in a double-countout because Lafitte refused to be pinned by Nash. In retaliation, the group effectively ended Ouellet's career with the company by scheduling him to repeatedly lose low-profile matches. In his autobiography, Michaels admitted that "we buried him." Lafitte left the company soon after the incident; contrary to rumors, Michaels says that WWF Chairman Vince McMahon did not fire Lafitte.

=== The MSG "Curtain Call" ===
In April 1996, Nash and Hall signed contracts with WCW, the WWF's top competitor, with whom the company was embroiled in a bitter rivalry. Accounts have differed as to what led to the men's departure. Wrestling commentators have speculated that their contracts were allowed to expire in order to cripple The Kliq's influence in the company, while official WWE media asserts that Nash and Hall were simply offered more money by WCW than the WWF was able to promise them at the time. Hall himself claimed he left because he felt his pay in the WWF had plateaued, while Nash has stated he left because WCW offered a guaranteed contract, something the WWF had been unwilling to do for any wrestler at that point.

Nash and Hall's last contracted match for the WWF took place on May 19, 1996, at Madison Square Garden. At the time, Levesque and Nash were wrestling as villains, while Michaels and Hall were fan favorites. At the end of the night, Michaels wrestled Nash in a steel cage match. Immediately after the match, Hall entered the ring and hugged Michaels; this was not seen as unusual in-story, as both wrestlers were babyfaces. However, Levesque then entered the ring and hugged Hall, followed by Nash. The four wrestlers then group hugged for several seconds before they turned to face the crowd with their arms raised together. Waltman, who himself would leave for WCW shortly after the incident, was in drug rehab at the time and thus didn't participate.

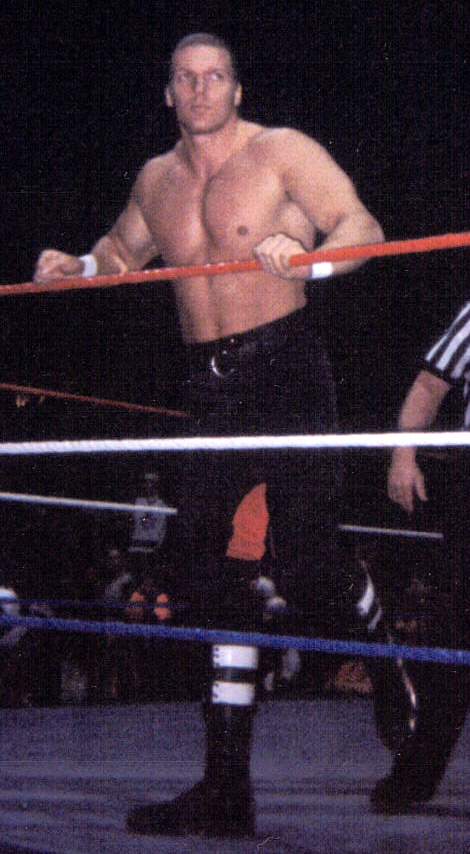
Triple H was the sole member of The Kliq punished for the "Curtain Call"

Their actions – dubbed the "Curtain Call" – scandalized WWF management. At the time, most major wrestling promotions, the WWF included, prided themselves on maintaining kayfabe – the illusion that all of the events which transpired in-ring were real and unscripted, and that wrestlers' on-screen rivalries extended outside of the ring. The company had a strict policy of onscreen rivals not breaking character by associating with one another on WWF programming, as a means of maintaining storylines and feuds between wrestlers, which sometimes lasted for years and could unravel in seconds if the two feuding wrestlers were seen associating as friends in public. WWF Chairman Vince McMahon was reported to have initially given his tacit approval for a "farewell" ceremony, but did not realize that it would become so elaborate. The severity of the incident was further compounded by the revelation that the event—which was not broadcast on television—had been filmed by two fans, Mani Mohtadi and Jason Cosmides, who had smuggled a camcorder past security. Stills from the footage were widely disseminated online and in wrestling magazines at the time, bringing the Curtain Call to a wider audience than if it had not been recorded.

Because Hall and Nash had already confirmed their departure for WCW, because Waltman was absent, and because Michaels was the WWF Champion and one of the promotion's biggest drawing performers, these four wrestlers escaped accountability. Instead, the punishment fell solely on Levesque, who was demoted from being a championship contender to wrestling inexperienced or lesser experienced wrestlers for the next several months. He did, however, win the WWF Intercontinental Championship five months later. Levesque's unquestioning acceptance of his punishment had the unintended side effect of rehabilitating his image in the eyes of other performers who held a grudge against him for his time with the Kliq: according to The Undertaker in the HHH: The Game DVD, when Levesque first arrived in the WWF he was perceived as being arrogant and self-centered, but by accepting his punishment he earned legitimate respect.

The incident turned out to have a major impact on the WWF's future. For the first time in modern pro-wrestling history, a major company was forced to acknowledge that its events were scripted; McMahon would later use this to his advantage in the development of several meta-storylines, including a skit on the October 6, 1997, episode of Raw Is War in which Michaels and Levesque, both in character, played footage of the Curtain Call incident. Before the Curtain Call, Levesque had been booked into the finals of the 1996 King of the Ring tournament during the following summer, but his place – and the push that usually went with it – would instead go to Stone Cold Steve Austin, igniting his rise toward superstardom, an event which ultimately helped the WWF defeat WCW in the Monday Night War. Levesque's acceptance of his punishment and the respect it earned him resulted in him only suffering short-term repercussions. He would go on to win the following year's King of the Ring tournament and later went on to become a 14-time world champion, beginning with his WWF Championship victory over Mankind the night after SummerSlam in 1999.

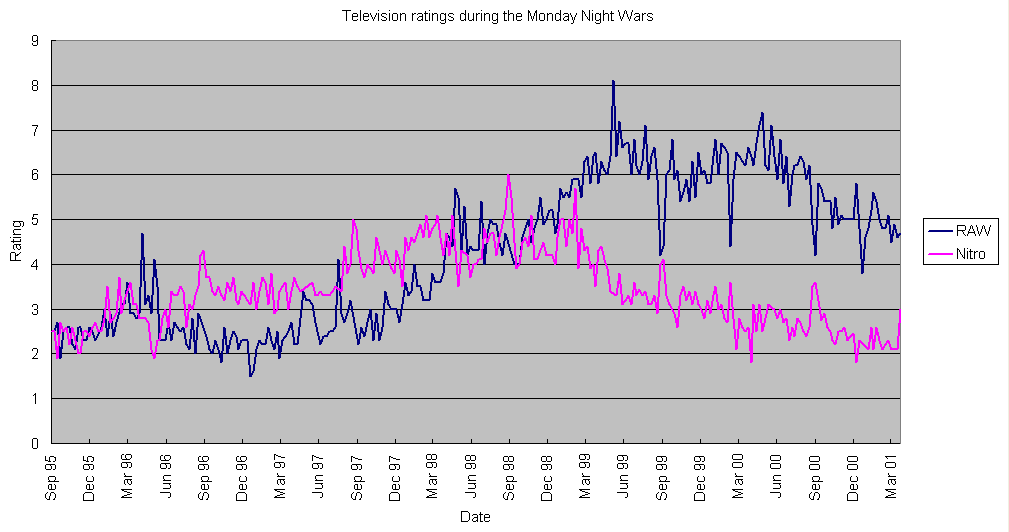
'Monday Night War' ratings following the incident had WCW Nitro leading WWF Raw for 83 weeks

=== The nWo and D-Generation X ===
When Hall and Nash went to WCW, they formed the tag team The Outsiders, as well as the New World Order (nWo) stable alongside Hulk Hogan. Rather than see the breaking of kayfabe as a crisis moment for professional wrestling, WCW decided to exploit it by introducing their own meta-storyline that incorporated fans' growing awareness of the backstage politics of pro-wrestling: Upon Nash and Hall's arrival, they were implied to still be working for the WWF, staging an "invasion" of WCW.

When Waltman later jumped to WCW, he also joined the nWo as Syxx, often working closely with the Outsiders and forming the trio known as the Wolfpac. Many fans criticized Kevin Nash for his booking tenure in WCW since it displayed the same self-promoting behavior associated with The Kliq on an even larger scale. Fans often pointed to Nash booking himself to win the WCW World Heavyweight Championship from the then-undefeated Goldberg and the subsequent match with Hogan as the most grievous of his "offenses". Nash, however, claims that he did not have booking power at the time of the incident. Nash's innocence claim is disputed in several shoot interviews by various WCW wrestlers from the time who claimed that he, Hogan and several others often refused to put other wrestlers over in order to keep themselves as the main stars.

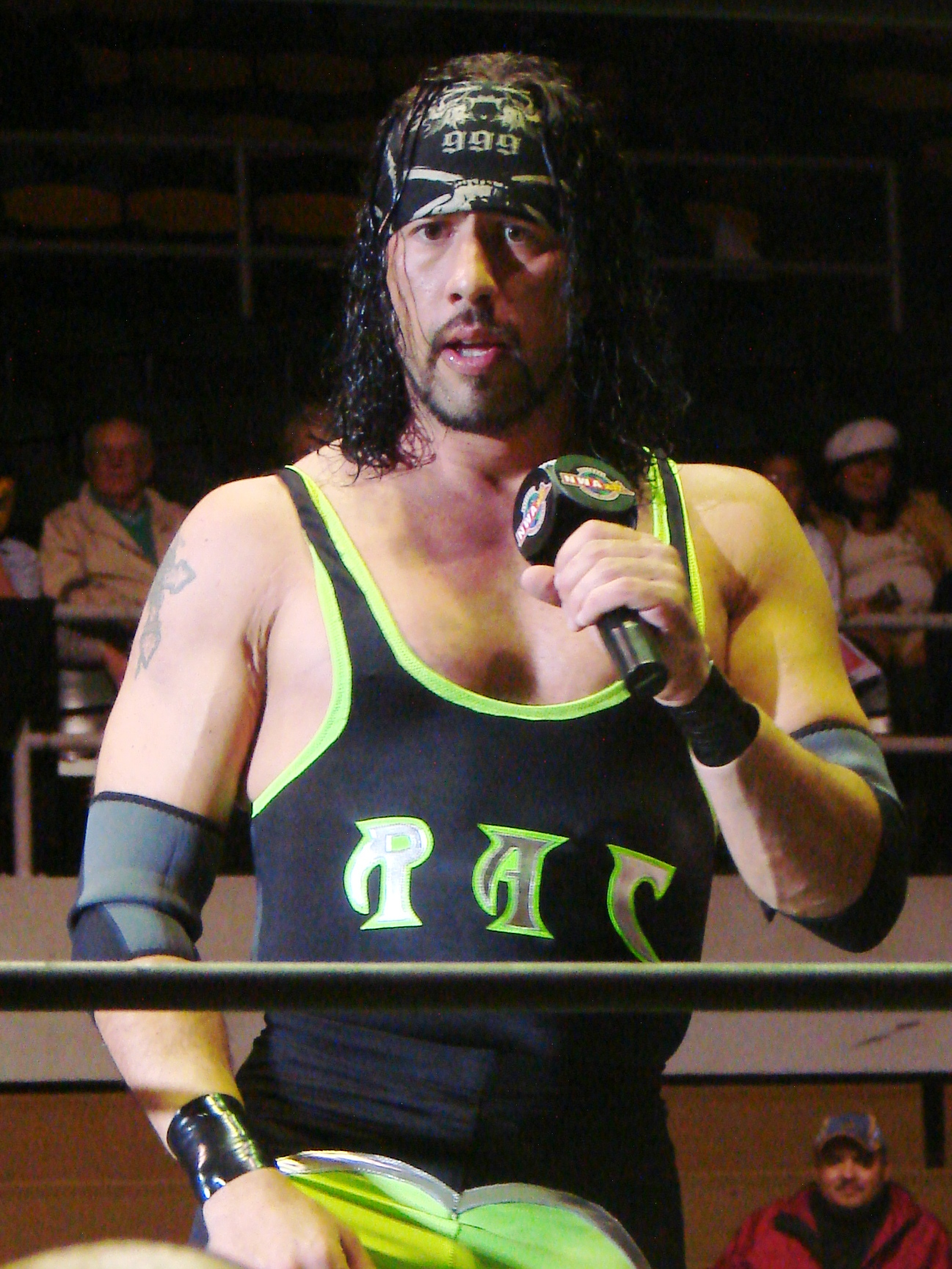
Sean Waltman was a member of both the nWo and D-Generation X

Meanwhile, Michaels and Levesque began to persuade WWF management to let them pair up on screen, but management was hesitant and wanted to keep them separated on-screen. They eventually aligned together in the faction D-Generation X (DX), with Levesque's "Hunter Hearst Helmsley" fictional persona gradually transformed and re-dubbed Triple H or HHH, and alongside Levesque's then-girlfriend and on-screen female "bodyguard" Chyna. Rick Rude also temporarily joined the group (as a sort of on-screen bodyguard for Michaels), though his membership ended when he signed with WCW after his WWF contract expired in early November 1997.

DX eventually became as influential to the Monday Night War as the nWo. DX's antics also went on to help spark The Attitude Era in the WWF. After Sean Waltman was fired from WCW, he was hired by WWF and joined DX, replacing the injured Michaels. The nWo's hand sign, often referred to as the "Wolf Head", was originally used by the Kliq members in the WWF. Waltman introduced it to them after touring Europe and seeing it being thrown up in a bar. Hall and Nash brought the hand sign with them to WCW and it became widely used by the nWo members and fans worldwide. Though Waltman was told it was the Turkish mafia sign (Kliq members refer to it as the "Turkish Wolf"), it is actually associated with the neo-fascist movement Grey Wolves.

On the October 6, 1997 Raw Is War, Shawn Michaels alluded to this off-screen connection. After Bret Hart claimed to have destroyed the Kliq and to have "run [Scott Hall and Kevin Nash] outta town", Michaels declared, "The Kliq owns this [professional wrestling] business", and said that it had really undergone "expansion" rather than "destruction". During a brief period in 1998, after Waltman's return to the WWF as X-Pac, in promos the members of DX made numerous references to their "friends" in WCW. On the April 27, 1998 Raw (recorded live in Hampton, Virginia), DX (by now composed of Triple H, Waltman, Billy Gunn, Road Dogg and Chyna) staged a mock "invasion" protest/paramilitary take-over of the nearby Norfolk Scope, where Nitro was being held. Triple H, riding in an M38, chanted "Let our people go!" through a megaphone during the incident. Waltman called out, "We just wanted to say 'what's up' to our boys Kevin Nash and Scott Hall". DX also led a chant of "WCW sucks" by fans outside the arena who had tickets to the show (some of whom, Triple H alleged, had been given free tickets to Nitro by WCW in order to boost crowd numbers, a common trick promoters have done to fill arenas and increase concession and merchandise sales).

In 2002, after WCW had gone out of business, the nWo was reformed in the WWF with Hall, Nash and Hogan, the group's initial members. Hogan soon left the group after being attacked by Nash and Hall as a result of his turning into a fan favorite at WrestleMania X8. Other former members, including Big Show and Waltman, joined the group. Later, Shawn Michaels – after years away from the ring –was introduced by Kevin Nash as the newest member of the nWo, and Michaels promised the rest of the group that he would soon deliver Triple H. After weeks of lobbying for Triple H's services, a backstage promo of The nWo wishing Triple H luck before the match aired. This included 4 members of The Kliq (Michaels, Nash, Waltman and Triple H), as Big Show appeared wishing Triple H good luck as well. The nWo told Triple H to "throw up the hand signal" if he needed any help out there. Shortly thereafter, Nash suffered a torn quadriceps (after returning the same night after time off due to a biceps injury) during a ten-man tag-team match, and the following week Vince McMahon disbanded The nWo. Eric Bischoff (acting as the Raw brand General Manager) later tried to make Michaels Triple H's manager. This led to a short-lived reformation of DX, as Triple H turned on him the same night, setting off a long and heated feud that took approximately two years to resolve. The year after, Nash returned from injury as a fan favorite and sided with Michaels against Evolution (Triple H, Ric Flair, Batista and Randy Orton).

=== Later formations ===
Michaels and Triple H have reformed D-Generation X multiple times, first reuniting for a six-month stint on the June 12, 2006, edition of Monday Night Raw. They would feud against the Spirit Squad (Kenny, Johnny, Mitch, Nicky, and Mikey), Big Show and Vince McMahon, and later the team of Rated-RKO (Edge and Randy Orton), until Triple H's legitimate knee injury in the beginning of 2007. They would reform again in August 2009 during Shawn Michaels' last year in the WWE. During this year, D-Generation X would capture the Unified WWE Tag Team Championships at TLC: Tables, Ladders & Chairs against Jericho and Big Show, which would become the start of the first and only title reign for Triple H and Shawn Michaels as a tag team. D-Generation X would later go on to disband in March 2010 (after losing the tag Team titles to Big Show and The Miz). Michaels would then focus heavily on ending the winning streak of The Undertaker at WrestleMania, having failed to do so at WrestleMania XXV, and he would put his career on the line for their second WrestleMania encounter at WrestleMania XXVI which he would go on to lose and therefore end his career.

Hall, Nash and Waltman (then working for Total Nonstop Action Wrestling) would reunite in a stable called The Band, where Hall and Nash won the TNA World Tag Team Championship, but Hall and Waltman were released shortly after (and Nash's contract would expire later on in the year).

On April 2, 2011, The Kliq, consisting of Nash, Waltman, Triple H and Shawn Michaels, made a special appearance as Shawn Michaels was inducted into the WWE Hall of Fame in 2011. Scott Hall decided not to attend the Hall of Fame ceremony or other WrestleMania XXVII festivities due to concerns of remaining sober. In 2014, at the conclusion of Scott Hall's Hall of Fame induction, the members of The Kliq joined him onstage and reunited for the first time since the curtain call incident. They reunited again in 2015 on an episode of Raw, and then again at Nash's Hall of Fame induction.

A December 2014 episode of WWE Network show The Monday Night War: WWE vs. WCW focused on The Kliq.

On March 14, 2022, Hall died at the age of 63.

== Sub-groups ==
Affiliate	Members
New World Order	Scott Hall; Kevin Nash; Syxx/X-Pac; Shawn Michaels
Wolfpac	Scott Hall; Kevin Nash; Syxx
D-Generation X	Shawn Michaels; Triple H X-Pac
The Outsiders	Scott Hall; Kevin Nash
Two Dudes with Attitudes	Shawn Michaels; Kevin Nash

== See also ==
- Bone Street Krew
