= Two Dudes with Attitudes =

Professional wrestling tag team

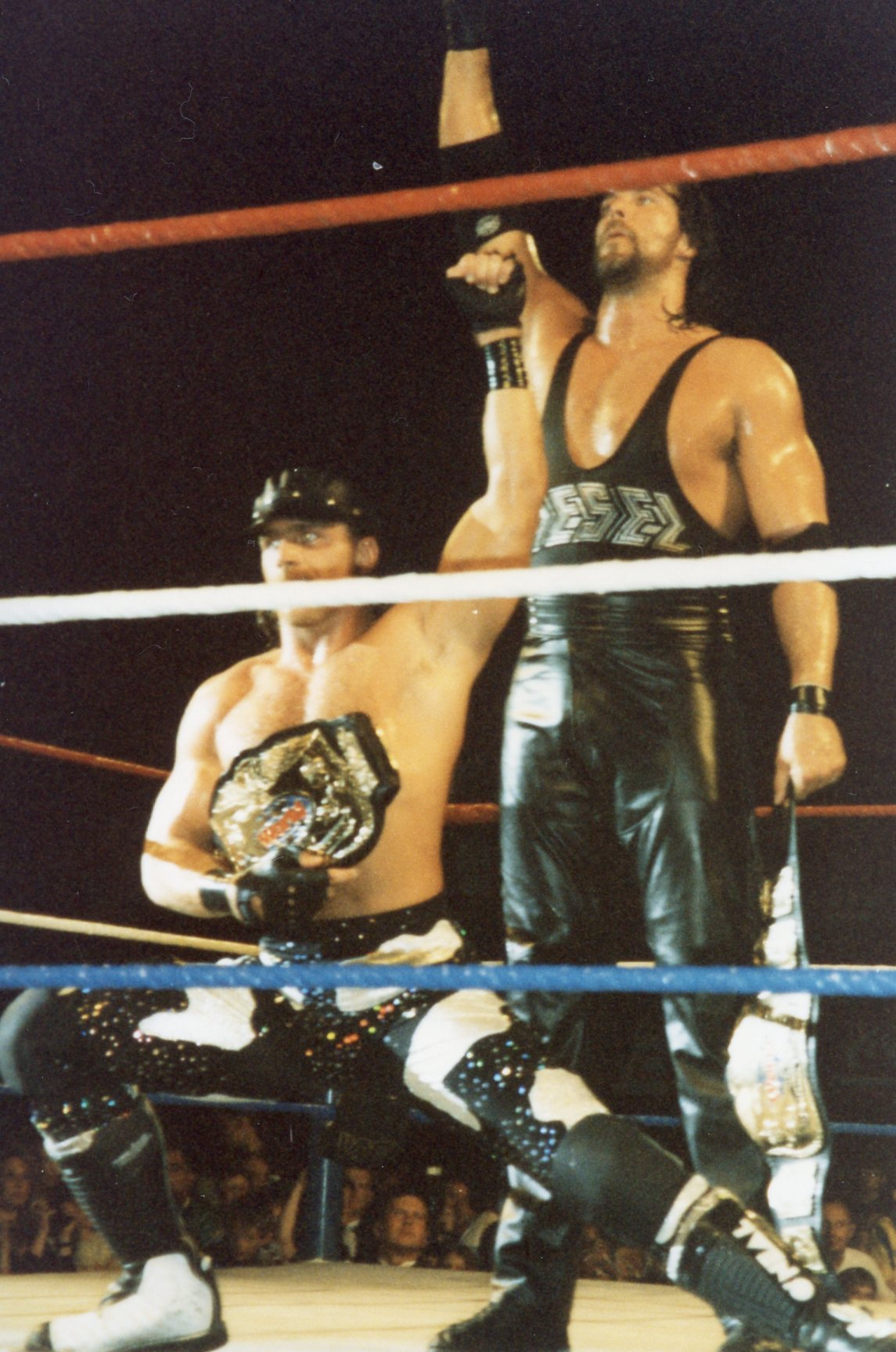
- Shawn Michaels (left) and Kevin Nash (right) as WWF Tag Team Champions in September 1994

Tag team
- Members: Kevin Nash; Shawn Michaels
- Name(s): Shawn Michaels and Diesel; Two Dudes with Attitudes; Dynamic Duo nWo; Shawn Michaels and Kevin Nash; Bronx Thugs (Unused in 1995)
- Billed heights: Kevin Nash: 6 ft 10 in (2.08 m); Shawn Michaels: 6 ft 1 in (1.85 m)
- Combined billed weight: 553 lb (251 kg; 39.5 st)
- Hometown: New York City By way of Motor City
- Billed from: Kevin Nash: Detroit, Michigan; Shawn Michaels: San Antonio, Texas
- Debut: June 6, 1993
- Years active: 1993, 1994, 1995, 2002, 2003

Kevin Nash and Shawn Michaels formed a tag team, also known as Two Dudes with Attitudes that competed in the World Wrestling Federation (WWF, now known as WWE) in 1994 and again in 1995 through March 1996, with a brief reunion in 2002 as a sub-group of the New World Order stable. The team held the WWF Tag Team Championship twice, but also found success in singles competition while still allied with one another, as Nash held the WWF Championship and Intercontinental Championship once each and Michaels held the Intercontinental Championship twice.

== History ==
=== First run (1993–1994) ===
The two first got together in mid-1993, when Nash (then known by Diesel) became a bodyguard for Shawn Michaels, who had won the Intercontinental Championship Nash helped Michaels win the Intercontinental Championship from Marty Jannetty on June 6, 1993. In mid-1994, Michaels acted as Nash's manager, leading him to win the Intercontinental Championship from Scott Hall.

The two would become a tag team when Michaels and Nash defeated The Headshrinkers at a house show, winning the WWF Tag Team Championship on August 28, 1994 in Indianapolis, Indiana.

At Survivor Series on November 23, 1994, Michaels accidentally hit Nash with a superkick, which lead to the team splitting, vacating the WWF Tag Team Championship title.

=== Second run (1995-1996) ===
In early 1995, Michaels and Nash feuded over the WWF Championship. Michaels won the Royal Rumble and unsuccessfully challenged Nash in a title match at WrestleMania XI on April 2, 1995.

On the April 3, 1995 episode of Monday Night Raw, Nash assisted Michaels from an attack from his kayfabe bodyguard, Sid Eudy.

Later that same year, Nash and Michaels would dub themselves "Two Dudes with Attitudes." At In Your House 3 on September 24, 1995, where they challenged WWF Tag Team Champions Owen Hart and Yokozuna. Nash and Michaels won the match and the WWF Tag Team Championship, but had to return it to Hart and Yokozuna the next day on a technicality following lobbying from Hart's and Yokozuna's lawyer, Clarence Mason.

"Two Dudes with Attitudes" disbanded for a second time after Nash lost the WWF Championship to Bret Hart at Survivor Series on November 19, 1995.

After Michaels won the WWF Championship from Hart at WrestleMania XII, Nash unsuccessfully challenged him at In Your House 7: Good Friends, Better Enemies on April 28, 1996. Nash and Michaels would continue to feud until Nash's departure from the WWF for the WCW in May 1996.

=== Reunions (2002, 2003) ===
Nash and Michaels would not reunite until June 3, 2002 on an episode of Monday Night RAW, where Nash would name Michaels as the newest member of the New World Order (nWo). On the June 10 episode of Raw, Michaels explained that his best friend Nash was always there for him, which was why he returned to WWE to become a member of the nWo. Michaels then shocked the audience by hitting Booker T with Sweet Chin Music to remove him from the nWo.

A month later, Nash tore his quadriceps, which broke up the nWo. When Nash returned from his injury in 2003, the duo teamed with Booker T to face Evolution (Triple H, Ric Flair, and Randy Orton) in an effort to have Nash win the World Heavyweight Championship from Triple H. At Judgment Day, Nash came close to winning the title until Triple H got himself disqualified when he hit referee Earl Hebner with a sledgehammer in the chest.

== Championships and accomplishments ==
- World Wrestling Federation
  - WWF Championship (1 time) – Diesel
  - WWF Intercontinental Championship (3 times) – Michaels (2) and Diesel (1)
  - WWF Tag Team Championship (2 times)
