= Bone Street Krew =

Professional wrestling backstage group

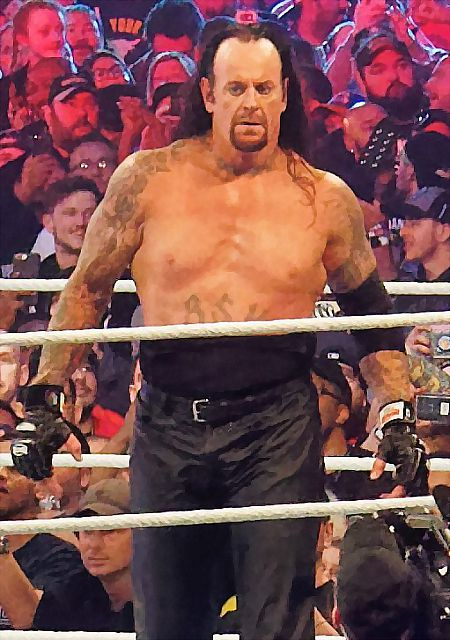
- The Undertaker, a member of the Bone Street Krew. The phrase "B.S.K pride" is tattooed on his abdomen.

Stable
- Members: Brian Adams; Henry O. Godwinn; Mr. Fuji; Paul Bearer; Mideon; The Godfather; Rikishi; Savio Vega; The Undertaker (co-founder); Yokozuna (co-founder)

In professional wrestling, the Bone Street Krew (also known as the Bone Street Killers; BSK) refers to a backstage group of wrestlers in the World Wrestling Federation (WWF) during the 1990s.

== History ==
The Bone Street Krew (BSK) was founded by Yokozuna, who coined the name of the group, and The Undertaker. It was made up of wrestlers who were friendly with one another and shared similar interests, including playing dominoes ("bones"). Members of the group were vetted by Yokozuna and The Undertaker. Several members of the Bone Street Krew had the letters "BSK" tattooed on themselves.

The Bone Street Krew was active alongside another backstage group in the WWF at the time, The Kliq. Contrary to popular belief, there was no animosity between the two groups.

In the mid-1990s, there were discussions around turning the Bone Street Krew into an onscreen stable, but this never materialized. However, four members of the Bone Street Krew teamed up as "The Darkside" at Survivor Series in 1995.

The Bone Street Krew dissolved in the late 1990s when several of the members left the WWF. In November 2020, several members of the Bone Street Krew attended a retirement ceremony for The Undertaker at Survivor Series.
