= Kevin Nash =

American professional wrestler (born 1959)

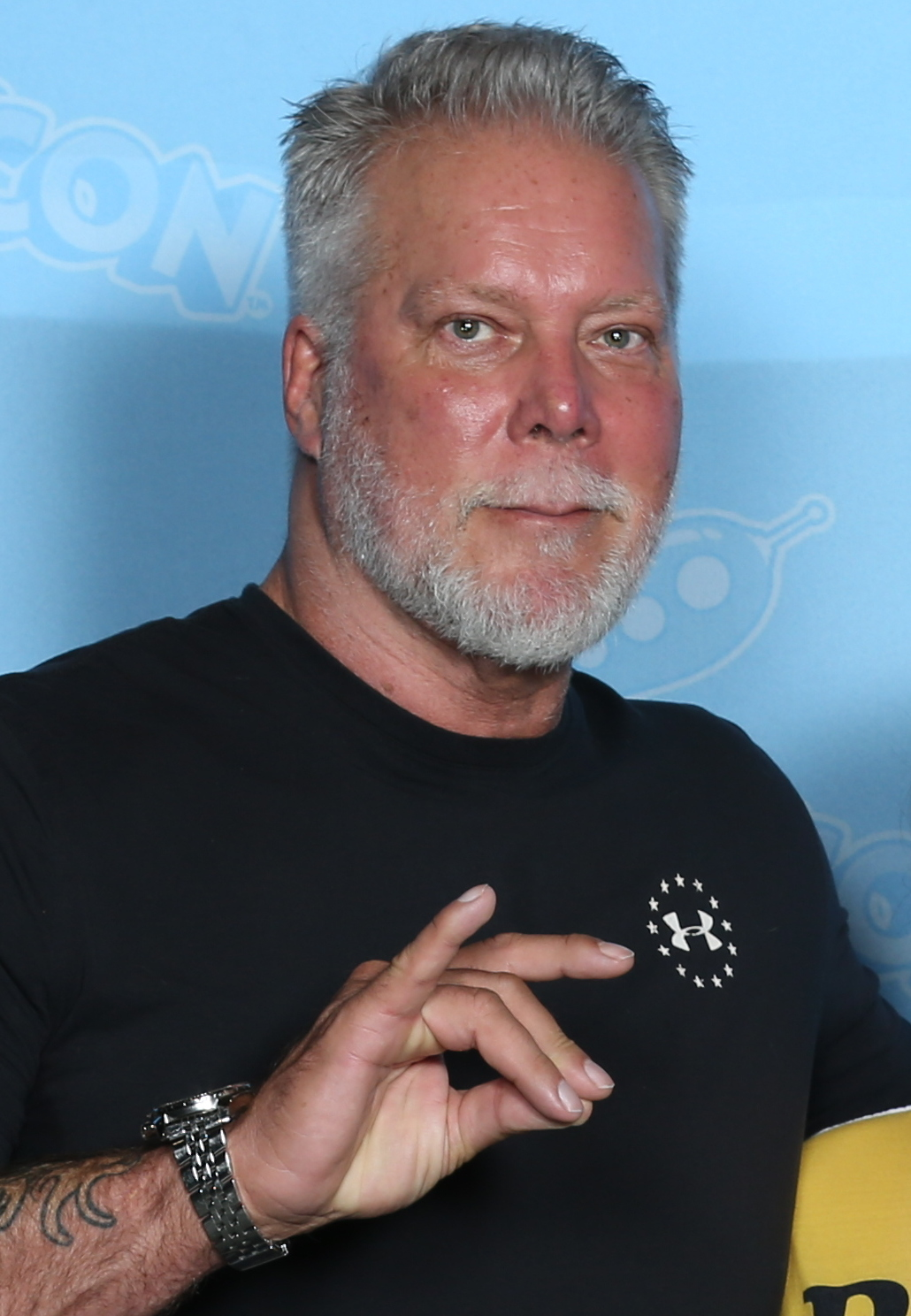
- Nash in 2022

Personal information
- Born: Kevin Scott Nash; July 9, 1959 (age 67) Detroit, Michigan, U.S.
- Spouse: Tamara McMichael (m. 1988)
- Children: 1
- Website: kevinnash.co

Professional wrestling career
- Ring name(s): Chet Lemon; Diesel; Dr. X The Great Oz; Kevin Nash; The Master Blaster; Master Blaster Steel; Oz; Vinnie Vegas
- Billed height: 6 ft 10 in (208 cm)
- Billed weight: 328 lb (149 kg)
- Billed from: Detroit, Michigan "The Steel Mines" "Emerald City"; North Scottsdale, Arizona
- Trained by: Jody Hamilton; WCW Power Plant
- Debut: 1987
- Retired: January 5, 2020 (Note: Nash confirmed that he was retired on January 5, 2020 though his last match took place in 2018.)
- Military service
- Allegiance: United States
- Branch: United States Army
- Service years: 1981–1983
- Rank: Specialist
- Unit: 202nd Military Police Company

YouTube information
- Channel: Kliq THIS
- Years active: 2022–present
- Genre: Professional wrestling
- Subscribers: 190 thousand
- Views: 51.6 million

Signature
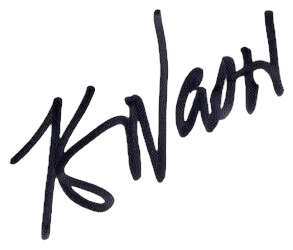

Kevin Scott Nash (born July 9, 1959) is an American retired professional wrestler, actor and podcaster. He is signed to WWE under a legends contract. He is also known for his tenures in World Championship Wrestling (WCW) and Total Nonstop Action Wrestling (TNA).

Nash first gained exposure in the professional wrestling industry by performing for WCW from 1990 to 1993 under multiple ring names. In 1993, Nash signed with the World Wrestling Federation (WWF, now WWE) under the name Diesel. While performing as Diesel, he achieved status as a top star in the company, winning the WWF World, Intercontinental and Tag Team Championships (the WWF Triple Crown). His 358-day reign as WWF Champion is the longest of the 1990s. While in the WWF, Nash was part of The Kliq, an influential backstage group that included Shawn Michaels, Triple H, Scott Hall and Sean Waltman.

Nash left the WWF and returned to WCW in 1996, where he performed under his real name, partnering with Hall as the Outsiders and founding the New World Order (nWo) with Hulk Hogan. As the nWo storyline became one of the most prominent of the Monday Night War, Nash maintained his status as a top star, winning the WCW World Heavyweight Championship five times and the WCW World Tag Team Championship nine times. After WCW went out of business, Nash returned to the WWF in 2002, where he briefly reformed the nWo and feuded with Triple H over the World Heavyweight Championship. He then performed in TNA for seven years, and he held their Legends and Tag Team championships once each. In 2011, Nash returned to WWE under a legends contract and he continues to make sporadic appearances for the promotion.

During his in-ring career, Nash won 20 major championships, including six world championships and twelve world tag team championships. Furthermore, he is a two-time WWE Hall of Famer, as he was inducted individually into the class of 2015 and in 2020 as an nWo member alongside Hogan, Hall and Waltman. He headlined numerous pay-per-view events for WCW, WWF/WWE and TNA, including WCW's flagship event, Starrcade, where he ended Bill Goldberg's undefeated streak after 173 wins in 1998.

Notable acting credits include The Punisher, the Magic Mike trilogy and John Wick.

== Early life ==
Nash was born on July 9, 1959, to a devout Christian family in southwest Detroit, Michigan. Nash's father, Robert, died of a heart attack on April 4, 1968, aged 36, when Nash was eight years old. On December 27, 1994, Nash's mother, Wanda, died after a four-year struggle against breast cancer. He attended Aquinas High School and the University of Tennessee, where he majored in psychology and minored in educational philosophy. At the University of Tennessee, Nash was a center for the Tennessee Volunteers basketball team. He remained on the team from 1977 to 1980, during which time the team made it to the NCAA Sweet 16. Following a physical altercation with head coach Don DeVoe and a series of other on-campus incidents, Nash did not play a fourth year for the Volunteers, and he attempted to transfer to Bowling Green State University in Bowling Green, Ohio.

Nash reconsidered his options and instead moved to Europe, where he played basketball professionally for various teams. His career ended just one year later in 1981 in West Germany (while playing for the Gießen 46ers) when he tore his anterior cruciate ligament. With his basketball career over, Nash enlisted in the U.S. Army and was assigned to the 202nd Military Police Company in Giessen, West Germany. He served in a secure NATO facility for two years, during which time he was promoted to the rank of specialist. After the Army, he worked on an assembly line at Ford Motor Company and as the floor manager of a strip club in Atlanta, Georgia. He then decided to try professional wrestling.

== Professional wrestling career ==
=== World Championship Wrestling (1990–1993) ===
==== Master Blasters (1990–1991) ====
Nash debuted in World Championship Wrestling (WCW) as the orange-mohawked "Steel", one half of the tag team known as the Master Blasters. He was initially partnered with Master Blaster Iron, with whom he made his debut at the Clash of the Champions XII on September 5, 1990, defeating Brad Armstrong and Tim Horner. At the following Worldwide taping on September 7, the Masters Blasters began a feud with Tim Horner and Mike Rotunda. They beat Horner and Rotunda on several house shows. On September 22, Nash's partner Master Blaster Iron was replaced by "Blade".

The reconstituted Master Blasters continued their undefeated streak in October. Meanwhile, Steel had his first singles match on September 28 by defeating Tom Zenk. At Halloween Havoc on October 27, 1990, the Blasters upended the Southern Boys and began to move up the WCW tag team ratings. Their winning streak ended on November 22, when Tom Zenk and Brian Pillman handed them their first defeat with Pillman pinning Blade. They rebounded to go on another undefeated streak by defeating the Southern Boys as well as Alan Iron Eagle and Tim Horner, and earning a NWA United States Tag Team Championship title shot against then champions the Steiner Brothers, but were defeated in two occasions. They were squashed on television in 52 seconds by the Steiners in a match that aired on Worldwide on February 2, 1991. Following this loss, their momentum dissipated as they lost to the Southern Boys and Ricky Morton and Tommy Rich, and they disbanded at the end of the month.

Nash was then rebranded as the Master Blaster in February 1991, who was pinned by Junkyard Dog on February 27. He also lost to Brian Pillman in house show matches, while appearing in tag team matches with Stan Hansen and Arn Anderson. His final match in this guise was against Pillman at a house show on May 12.

==== Oz (1991–1992) ====
A week later, Nash reappeared under his new gimmick, having been repackaged as the silver-haired Oz, a character based on the Wizard of Oz from the 1900 children's book The Wonderful Wizard of Oz. Oz, managed by The Great Wizard, was pushed strongly for about a month, he squashed several wrestlers before losing to Ron Simmons at The Great American Bash on July 14. In reality, all plans for Oz were immediately scrapped when Nash refused to sign a $300/night guarantee as WCW was cutting costs. A decision was made to retain Nash until a new gimmick could be developed. On October 27, he lost to Bill Kazmaier at Halloween Havoc. Nash wrestled as Oz throughout the remainder of 1991 and went on a lengthy losing streak, suffering defeats by Kazmaier, Rick Steiner, Dustin Rhodes, and Arachnaman.

He later used the gimmick for New Japan Pro Wrestling as the Great Oz in May 1992.

==== Vinnie Vegas (1992–1993) ====
On January 21, 1992, at Clash of the Champions XVIII, he was repackaged as Vinnie Vegas, a wisecracking pseudo-mobster based on Steve Martin's character in the 1990 film My Blue Heaven. Vegas was quickly recruited into "A Half-Ton of Holy Hell", a stable of large wrestlers created by Harley Race which included WCW World Champion Lex Luger, Big Van Vader and Mr. Hughes. The stable separated in February 1992 after Luger left, and Vegas joined the Diamond Mine, a stable led by Diamond Dallas Page that also included the Diamond Studd and Scotty Flamingo. In the summer of 1992, after Studd and Flamingo left the stable (Studd leaving for the WWF and Flamingo striking out on his own), Page and Vegas began teaming together as the Vegas Connection. The tag team split in late 1992 after Page was fired by Bill Watts.

Nash spent the first half of 1993 teaming with Big Sky. In June, he decided to depart for the World Wrestling Federation (WWF) and had his final WCW match on June 3, teaming with Big Sky in a losing effort against The Cole Twins, this match would air on Worldwide after his WWF debut.

=== World Wrestling Federation (1993–1996) ===
==== Two Dudes with Attitudes (1993–1994) ====
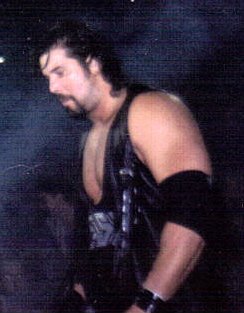
Diesel in 1994

In June 1993, Nash left WCW, signing a contract with the WWF at the request of Shawn Michaels. He was given the stage name of "Big Daddy Cool Diesel" ("Diesel" or "Big Daddy Cool" for short), with an alpha-male gimmick. For the role, he grew long hair, taking on the appearance and demeanor of a cocky thug from Detroit, sporting black sunglasses and leather garments. The name of Diesel, suggested by Shane McMahon, was a play on the fact that Nash was from Detroit, known famously as the "Motor City". His initial entrance music was a series of truck engine and horn noises.

Diesel started out as the bodyguard/best friend of Shawn Michaels, with the two being known as Two Dudes with Attitudes. He made his WWF debut at a house show on June 6, 1993, by assisting Michaels in defeating Marty Jannetty for the WWF Intercontinental Championship. He first appeared on television the next night on Raw, June 7, as he was introduced as Michaels's bodyguard. In January 1994, Diesel appeared at the Royal Rumble, first as one of the many wrestlers who assisted WWF Champion Yokozuna in defeating The Undertaker in their casket match and then in the Royal Rumble match, eliminating seven men in under 18 minutes of in-ring time.

Diesel won the Intercontinental Championship from Razor Ramon, following interference from Michaels on the April 30, 1994 episode (taped April 13, 1994) of Superstars. The duo of Diesel and Michaels defeated The Headshrinkers to win the WWF Tag Team Championship on August 28, making Nash a double champion. However, Diesel lost the Intercontinental Championship back to Ramon the following night at SummerSlam. The alliance between Diesel and Michaels dissolved after Survivor Series, when Michaels accidentally performed a superkick on Diesel. Diesel then chased Michaels, and despite failing to catch him, the reaction from the crowd turned him babyface. However, Nash was no longer a tag team champion, as Michaels' actions resulted in the team being forced to vacate the titles.

==== WWF Champion (1994–1995) ====
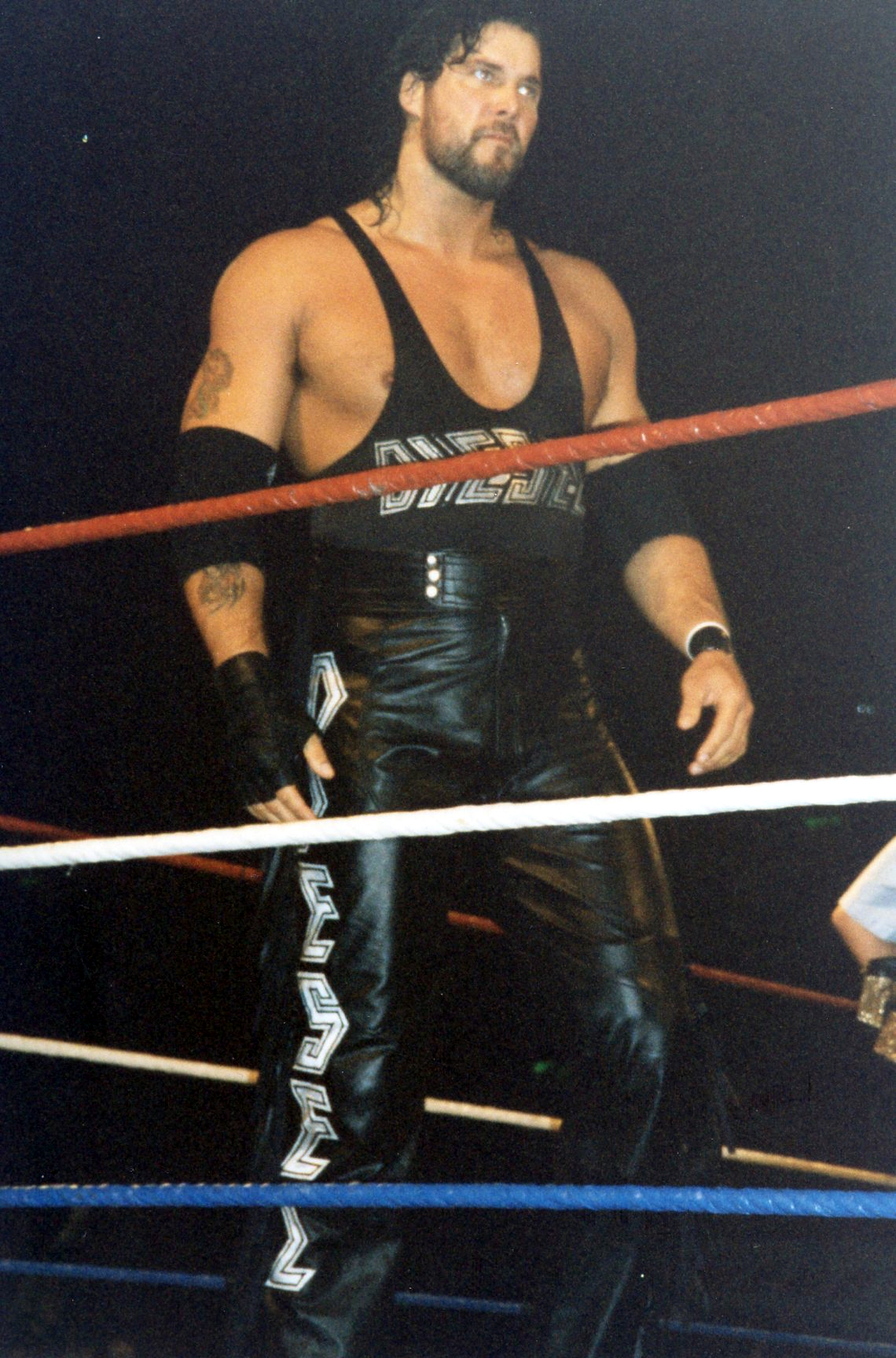
Nash (as Diesel) in 1994

On November 26, 1994, Diesel faced Bob Backlund for the WWF Championship he had won from Bret Hart three days prior at Survivor Series. In the match at Madison Square Garden, Diesel defeated Backlund in the first ten seconds of the bout. Diesel then promised Hart a match for his title, which they had the next month at the Royal Rumble. The match ended in a draw due to interference from several wrestlers, including Shawn Michaels. Michaels was irate about his former bodyguard having beaten him to the WWF Championship and was sufficiently motivated to win the Royal Rumble match later that evening, earning himself a title shot at WrestleMania XI.

At WrestleMania XI on April 2, Nash, accompanied to ringside by actress Pamela Anderson (who was supposed to valet for Michaels), defeated Michaels to retain the title. After the match, he left the ring with both Anderson and Michaels' replacement for her, Jenny McCarthy. The next night on Monday Night Raw, Michaels was betrayed by his new bodyguard, Sycho Sid, prompting Diesel to come to his rescue and thus reunited the tag team. Diesel successfully defended the WWF Championship against Sycho Sid at the inaugural In Your House pay-per-view on May 14, and at In Your House 2: The Lumberjacks on July 23. At SummerSlam, Diesel retained the WWF Championship by defeating King Mabel, who had won the King of the Ring tournament.

On September 24 at In Your House 3 in Saginaw, Michigan, Diesel and Michaels challenged the reigning WWF Tag Team Champions Owen Hart and Yokozuna. The match had a winner-take-all stipulation, as in addition to the tag belts, Diesel's WWF Championship and Michaels' recently won Intercontinental Championship were also on the line. When Hart did not show up at the event, he was replaced by Davey Boy Smith. In the course of the match, Hart arrived at ringside, entered the ring and was pinned by Diesel for the win and the title, making him and Michaels holders of all three major WWF championships. The reign did not last long, however, as Hart and Yokozuna had the titles returned to them the next night on Raw due to Hart not being an official part of the match when he was pinned.

Diesel's WWF Championship reign continued until November 19, when he was defeated by Bret Hart at Survivor Series. Following the loss, Diesel attacked Hart and began a tweener turn.

==== Final feuds; departure (1995–1996) ====
At In Your House 5 in December 1995, Diesel lost by disqualification to Owen Hart, who had injured Diesel's ally Shawn Michaels in a match the prior month. In January 1996, Diesel competed in the Royal Rumble, entering at number 22. Diesel was the last man to be eliminated from the Royal Rumble, being superkicked over the top rope by the winner, Shawn Michaels. Following the match, Diesel teased attacking Michaels before instead giving him a high five. Diesel went on to interfere in the main event between The Undertaker and WWF Champion Bret Hart, costing The Undertaker the title. At In Your House 6 on February 18, Diesel attempted to regain the WWF Championship from Hart in a steel cage match, losing after The Undertaker attacked him in retaliation for his actions at the Royal Rumble.

Shortly before WrestleMania XII, Nash's contract status was in a state of flux. At the time, WCW was offering large amounts of money to the WWF's talent by Eric Bischoff, WCW Executive Vice President, to jump ship. In fact, Bischoff had succeeded in convincing several high-profile WWF stars to sign with WCW over the previous two years, including five-time former WWF Champion Hulk Hogan and his on-again, off-again friend and two-time former WWF Champion Randy Savage, and was in the process at the time of talking to Nash's friend Scott "Razor Ramon" Hall about a contract as Hall's too was set to expire. Nash explained on the WWE Classics on Demand exclusive series Legends of Wrestling that Hall had been the first to sign with the company and was offered a contract that paid him "above Sting money" (at the time, Sting was one of the highest paid wrestlers in the company and although Ric Flair, Hulk Hogan, and Randy Savage had been making more, Sting's contract was used as a measuring stick). Hall also informed Nash that he had been given "most favored nation" status, which meant that if someone new was hired for more money, Hall's contract would increase to match that contract. Bischoff ended up offering Nash a three-year guaranteed contract with a $1.2 million annual salary. Nash said to Vince McMahon that he did not want to leave the WWF and that if McMahon was willing to match the offer, he would stay. McMahon said no because, according to Nash, he would have had to offer matching contracts to other wrestlers and with the promotion in a bad financial situation, he simply could not afford it. Nash signed his contract shortly thereafter.

Diesel lost to The Undertaker at WrestleMania XII on March 31, after which he finally turned heel and went on to feud with Shawn Michaels once again after he turned on him at a Madison Square Garden live event. In his last televised WWF appearance until 2002, Diesel challenged Michaels for the WWF Championship (which he had won from Hart at WrestleMania XII) at In Your House: Good Friends, Better Enemies on April 28. He wrestled Michaels for the title once again in a steel cage match at a house show on May 19, but was again defeated. After the match, Diesel, Michaels, Razor Ramon, and Hunter Hearst Helmsley, a group of off-screen friends known collectively as "The Kliq", hugged one another in the ring and wished each other farewell. This incident, later referred to as the "Curtain Call" or "MSG Incident", was a serious breach of character, as it showed heels and babyfaces consorting with one another. Shortly thereafter, with his obligations to the WWF now completely fulfilled, Nash left for WCW.

=== Return to WCW (1996–2001) ===
==== New World Order (1996–1999) ====
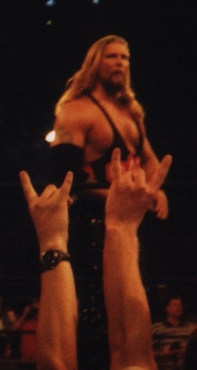
Nash, Scott Hall and Sean Waltman called themselves "The Wolfpac" and made hand gestures the crowd is seen giving Nash here.

After two weeks of Scott Hall returning on WCW programming and taunting announcers, wrestlers, and the company, Nash also returned alongside his friend on June 10, 1996, after Hall interrupted Eric Bischoff. The duo were known as The Outsiders, and the storyline originally pushed them as "invaders" from the WWF (which WCW eventually had to scale back due to legal concerns from the WWF). At Bash at the Beach, Hall and Nash fought the team of Lex Luger, Sting, and Randy Savage and promised to add one more man to their entourage. After Luger was taken out of the match, Hulk Hogan came out to make the save, only to turn on Savage and reveal himself as Nash and Hall's third man. Immediately after this, they began cutting promos calling themselves the New World Order (nWo). During his return, he had dyed his hair blonde. Through late 1996 and into 1997, Nash normally teamed with Hall as the Outsiders, and they held the WCW World Tag Team Championship. Nash also began to show his leadership qualities in the nWo, and became a sort of "second in command" alongside Hogan. Nash, Hall, and Sean Waltman distinguished themselves from the rest of the nWo, calling themselves the "Wolfpac" in 1997.

After a while, however, the nWo began to fight within its ranks, with Hogan and Nash battling for control. The situation came to a head on April 20, 1998, during a match between Hogan and recent nWo inductee (and rival) Randy Savage for Savage's recently won WCW World Heavyweight Championship. During the match, Nash interfered on Savage's behalf and jackknifed Hogan to the mat, signaling the breakup of the nWo into two separate factions (Nash's interference was not enough to prevent Hogan from regaining his championship, thanks to Bret Hart's interference shortly thereafter). Nash became the leader of nWo Wolfpac, alongside Savage, Curt Hennig, and Konnan. Hennig, however, shortly thereafter defected over to Hogan's nWo Hollywood faction. Then, during a match between Hall, Nash, Sting and The Giant (who had recently rejoined the nWo after being kicked out two years prior), Hall turned on Nash by hitting him with his tag team title belt and leaving the ring. The Wolfpac, however, was not down for long as Lex Luger joined Nash's team. Sting would eventually become a member as well, after being recruited heavily by both sides towards the middle of 1998. After Sting won Giant's half of the tag team title at the Great American Bash that June, Nash became Sting's partner. They defended the championship until July 20, when they were defeated by Hall and The Giant. Nash then set his sights on his former partner, and the rivalry came to a head at Halloween Havoc on October 25. During the course of the match, Nash jackknifed Hall twice but, instead of pinning him, left the ring and lost via countout. In November 1998, Nash and Diamond Dallas Page became a part of a loosely organised "creative team" which also included Dusty Rhodes and Kevin Sullivan.

The following month at World War 3, Nash entered the 60-man, three ring battle royal that was a staple of the pay-per-view, with the winner getting a shot at the WCW World Heavyweight Championship at Starrcade the following month. Nash survived to the end after clearing the ring out and big booting Lex Luger, who had Scott Hall in the Torture Rack, over the top rope, and earned his shot at the title. At Starrcade, Nash won the WCW World Heavyweight Championship from Goldberg (who had an officially given 173–0 win–loss record before the match) after Hall shocked Goldberg with a stun gun. In doing so, Nash broke Goldberg's long running undefeated streak. On January 4, 1999, Nash and Goldberg were set to meet in a rematch, but the match did not happen due to Goldberg being arrested for “stalking” Miss Elizabeth. That night also marked the return of Hulk Hogan after his "retirement" two months prior. With Goldberg unable to wrestle, Nash challenged Hogan instead. Hogan simply poked Nash in the chest, who proceeded to fall down and willingly allow Hogan to pin him for the title. The gesture marked the reunion of the feuding nWo factions into one. The return, however, was short-lived, and by May 1999, the nWo reunion was over due to injuries to Hogan, Hall, Luger and Steiner.

==== WCW World Heavyweight Champion (1999–2001) ====
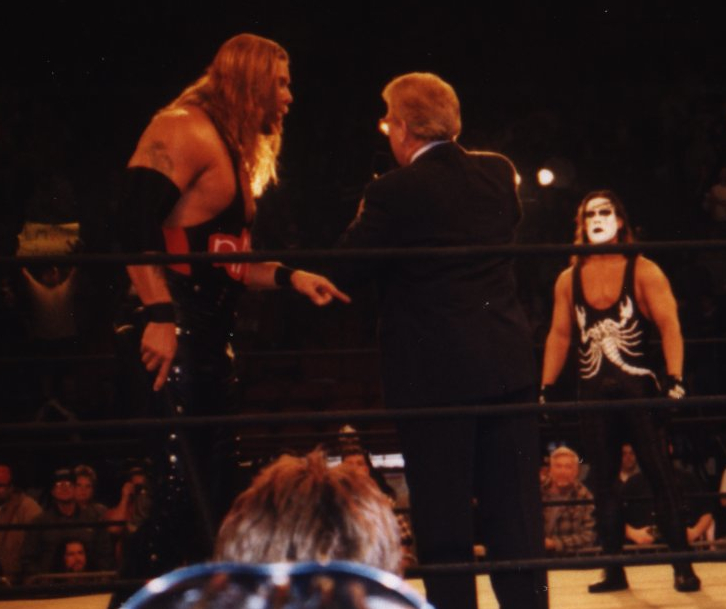
Nash in the ring with Sting, who he would later join forces with after the formation of the nWo Wolfpac

In May 1999, Nash won the WCW World Heavyweight Championship for the second time by defeating Diamond Dallas Page at Slamboree. He then appeared on The Tonight Show and put up a $250,000 challenge to Bret Hart for its May 24 program. However, Bret's brother, Owen, died in a wrestling stunt just as Bret was flying to Los Angeles; this immediately canceled their match and the feud. Nash then entered a feud with the returning Randy Savage, who was later joined by a returning Sid Vicious at The Great American Bash in June when he powerbombed Nash during the match, thus giving Nash a disqualification victory (as the signature move of both men, the Jackknife Powerbomb, had been ruled an "illegal" move by WCW leadership due to its high potential for injury). This rivalry culminated in a tag team match at Bash at the Beach in July 1999 which pitted Nash and Sting against Savage and Sid. A stipulation was added that whoever got the pin in the match would become WCW World Heavyweight Champion. Nash was pinned by Savage and lost his championship, but would get his revenge the next night on Nitro in a title match between Savage and a returning Hulk Hogan, and in a similar situation to Savage's first title defense from the previous year, he used a Jackknife Powerbomb on Savage, preserving the victory for Hogan. The following week, however, Nash attacked Hogan during a match pitting Hogan against Vicious. Nash, Sid, and Rick Steiner then feuded with Hogan, Sting, and a returning Goldberg until Road Wild, where Hogan defeated Nash in a "retirement" match.

On October 4, 1999, Nash returned to WCW along with Scott Hall, which was later revealed to be a new version of the nWo involving Nash, Hall, Bret Hart, and Jeff Jarrett called 'nWo 2000'. This would not last long either due to the injury of Hart, and Nash spent most of 2000 feuding with the likes of Terry Funk, Mike Awesome, Scott Steiner, and Booker T.

Nash won the WCW World Heavyweight Championship again from Booker T on the August 28, 2000 episode of Monday Nitro in Las Cruces, New Mexico. He eventually lost it to Booker T later on at Fall Brawl. He even had a stint as WCW Commissioner, and he served as a coach/mentor to the Natural Born Thrillers, who would eventually turn on Nash. Nash aligned himself with Diamond Dallas Page, reuniting the Vegas Connection, but renamed the Insiders. They feuded with the Perfect Event (Shawn Stasiak and Chuck Palumbo) and won the WCW World Tag Team Championship at Mayhem on November 26, 2000. Shortly after, they were stripped of the titles by Commissioner Mike Sanders in mid-December. Weeks later, they won the titles back at Starrcade. In 2001 (WCW's final months), the Insiders continued their feud with the Natural Born Thrillers. Nash lost another "retirement" match to Scott Steiner at SuperBrawl Revenge, but it would not be long before WCW announced the sale of the company to the World Wrestling Federation. As he had a guaranteed contract with AOL Time Warner, Nash elected to wait out the remainder of his contract, which expired on December 31, 2001.

=== Return to WWF/E (2002–2003) ===
==== New World Order reunion (2002) ====
Following the expiration of his AOL Time Warner contract, Nash, along with Scott Hall and Hulk Hogan, were rehired by the WWF. Their rehiring was announced several weeks before their debut, with Vince McMahon claiming to have hired the nWo in order to destroy the WWF – of which Ric Flair was now a co-owner, which McMahon could not tolerate. Billed as the original nWo, Nash, Hall, and Hogan returned to the WWF at No Way Out on February 17, 2002. In the course of the evening, the nWo delivered an interview in which they claimed to have reformed, gave a six pack of beer to Stone Cold Steve Austin (which he refused), and traded insults with The Rock. They interfered in the main event of the evening, helping Chris Jericho retain his Undisputed WWF Championship against Austin. At WrestleMania X8 on March 17, Nash continually interfered in the match between Hall and Austin to the point where he was forced to return backstage. Later that night, he and Hall turned on Hogan after he had offered congratulations to The Rock for defeating him. In March, Nash suffered a biceps injury that put him out of action for several months and almost immediately upon returning, suffered a quadriceps tear in a tag match on the July 8 episode of Raw. On the July 15 episode of Raw, the nWo was officially disbanded by Vince McMahon as Eric Bischoff became Raw general manager.

==== Feud with Triple H (2003) ====
After a nine-month injury, Nash returned as a face on the April 7, 2003 episode of Raw, much to the delight of both Shawn Michaels and Triple H, who were feuding with each other when Nash returned. As part of the storyline, Nash was given a choice to remain friends with either Michaels or Triple H. After Nash would not make the decision, Triple H made the decision for him and turned on him with a low blow. This led to Nash and Triple H feuding with one another. Nash teamed up with Michaels and Booker T against Triple H, Ric Flair and Chris Jericho in a six-man tag team match at Backlash on April 27 which ended with Triple H picking up the win for his team, pinning Nash after hitting him with a sledgehammer. Following Backlash, Nash was granted a shot at Triple H's World Heavyweight Championship, and the two squared off at Judgment Day on May 18 with Michaels and Flair in their respective corners. Triple H would get himself disqualified and kept the title as a result, but this did not stop Nash from attacking Triple H following the match, putting him through the announcer's table with a Jackknife Powerbomb. The next month, they fought again in a Hell in a Cell match at Bad Blood on June 15 with Mick Foley as the special guest referee, but Nash lost the match.

In August, Nash feuded with Chris Jericho and was forced to cut his hair after losing a hair vs. hair match against Jericho on the August 18 episode of Raw. This was made to cover Nash having to cut his hair for his role as The Russian for the 2004 Punisher film. His last match in WWE was at SummerSlam on August 24 in an Elimination Chamber match for the World Heavyweight Championship against Triple H, Shawn Michaels, Goldberg, Chris Jericho, and Randy Orton. He was the first to be eliminated after Jericho pinned him following Sweet Chin Music from Michaels. Before leaving, however, he executed a Jackknife Powerbomb on Jericho and Orton. Nash then stepped away from in-ring action and underwent neck surgery.

=== Total Nonstop Action Wrestling (2004–2011) ===
==== Kings of Wrestling (2004–2005) ====
Nash debuted in Total Nonstop Action Wrestling (TNA) alongside the returning Scott Hall on November 7, 2004, at the inaugural monthly TNA pay-per-view, Victory Road, with the duo helping NWA World Heavyweight Champion Jeff Jarrett retain his title in a ladder match with Jeff Hardy. In subsequent weeks, the trio identified themselves as the Kings of Wrestling and began feuding with Hardy and A.J. Styles. At Turning Point on December 5, the Kings of Wrestling were defeated by Hardy, Styles, and Randy Savage.

Hall left TNA in early 2005, and Nash and Jarrett separated after Nash made clear his desire to win the NWA World Heavyweight Championship. Nash received a title shot against Jarrett on February 13, 2005, at Against All Odds, but lost following interference from the debuting Outlaw. Following the defeat, Nash joined forces with Sean Waltman and began feuding with the newly formed Planet Jarrett. At Destination X on March 13, Nash lost to The Outlaw in a First Blood match following interference from Jarrett, who struck Nash with his title belt. The rivalry between Planet Jarrett and Nash and his allies culminated in a scheduled Lethal Lockdown match at Lockdown on April 24 pitting Nash, Waltman, and Diamond Dallas Page against Jarrett, The Outlaw, and "The Alpha Male" Monty Brown. Nash, however, was removed from the card and replaced with B.G. James after contracting a staph infection, which left him sidelined for much of 2005.

Nash returned to TNA on October 1 for the first episode of Impact! on Spike TV, attacking and powerbombing Jarrett. Nash went on to challenge Jarrett to a match for the NWA World Heavyweight Championship at Bound for Glory on October 23. In the weeks preceding the event, Nash and Jarrett had several heated confrontations, on one occasion brawling with one another and with guest referee Tito Ortiz. On October 22, one day before Bound for Glory, Nash was hospitalized with chest pains. At Bound for Glory, a battle royal was held to determine the number one contender; Rhino won and then defeated Jarrett for the NWA World Heavyweight Championship. Nash was later discharged from the hospital, having suffered a mild cardiac episode. He made a partial return to the ring in December 2005, wrestling several matches on a tour of South Africa.

==== Paparazzi Productions (2006–2007) ====
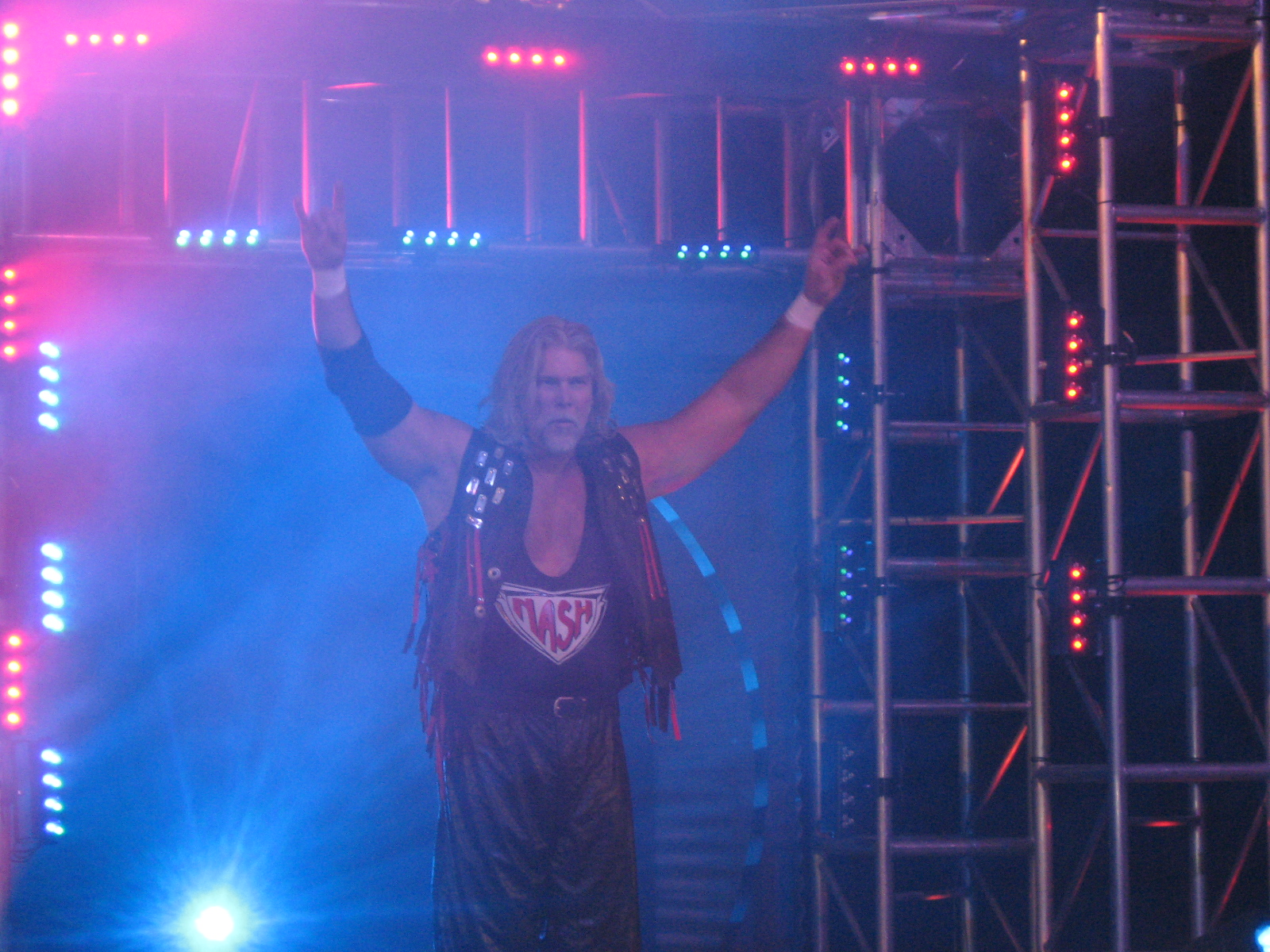
Nash in TNA in 2008

Nash returned to TNA once more on the April 27, 2006 episode of Impact!, announcing in a pre-taped segment that he would give a private interview to Alex Shelley one week later. The interview saw Nash claim to be the most profitable WWF World Heavyweight Champion of all time and describe the X Division as "basically filler". Nash went on to announce that he intended to destroy the X Division in order to reassert his position within TNA. He began his campaign at Sacrifice on May 14, powerbombing Puma and continued his campaign on the May 19 episode of Impact! by attacking Chris Sabin shortly after he had defeated Petey Williams to win the TNA 2006 World X Cup Tournament for Team USA. Nash continued to attack X Division wrestlers over subsequent weeks, leading to Sabin challenging him to a match at Slammiversary. Nash's attacks were also coupled with pre-taped segments with Shelley (some appearing only on the internet website YouTube) and his "X Division debut" on the June 15 episode of Impact!, where Nash wrestled a comedy match against a midget Shelley dubbed a "Sabin-type wrestler". Nash defeated Sabin at Slammiversary in his second televised match in almost a year, albeit with the assistance of Shelley.

Around this time, Nash and Shelley formed a stable known as Paparazzi Productions, with Johnny Devine as a cameraman. Nash then decided to go for the X Division championship. He got penciled into a Number One Contendership match for the title against Sabin at Hard Justice. He claimed that he had developed an 840° somersault splash that he would unveil in the match. However, over the weekend, he suffered a mysterious neck injury, supposedly while practicing it with Tito Ortiz, and named Alex Shelley as his replacement in the match. From a wheelchair, Nash was helpless as he watched Shelley lose the match to Sabin. Nash remained out of action due to the injury, but returned prior to Bound for Glory, and announced The Kevin Nash Open Invitational X Division Gauntlet Battle Royal. Austin Starr won the match. Nash took an interest in Starr, which seemed to be at the behest of Shelley. Nash then worked with the X Division stars in a weekly segment known as the Paparazzi Championship Series (a play on the "Bowl Championship Series"). He also began continuing these skits along with Sonjay Dutt and Jay Lethal, in a segment called "Paparazzi Idol". Nash became a manager of sorts for Lethal, helping him adopt a gimmick where he impersonated "Macho Man" Randy Savage. At Sacrifice, Lethal and Dutt had an altercation. Nash broke it up, but Sonjay kicked him. Sonjay apologized, and Nash forgave him. Dutt then became the Guru with Nash humming mantras backstage.

He then began managing The Motor City Machine Guns, but this was short-lived before he next appeared in the role of Dr. Nash, psychiatrist and adviser to Kurt and Karen Angle. Nash then engaged in a brief program with TNA Heavyweight Champion Kurt Angle, which eventually culminated in Nash aiding Angle. Nash warned the Angles about how dangerous Sting can be based on Nash's experience feuding with Sting in WCW. At Bound for Glory, Nash interfered on Angle's behalf during his World Title defense against Sting. However, it was for naught, as Sting captured the title from Angle via Scorpion Death Drop after fending off Nash and Angle's wife, Karen. The following Thursday on Impact!, Nash and Angle had an altercation because Angle blamed Nash for him losing the World Title. Angle eventually attacked Nash, who retaliated by Jackknife Powerbombing Angle in the middle of the ring. The following week, Sting defended the TNA World Title against Angle in a rematch from Bound for Glory, and Nash had a ringside seat. After the match went on a bit, Angle and Sting were out of the ring and when Angle pushed Sting onto Nash, Sting turned around and hit Nash in the face with a right hand shot, leading to Nash interfering on Angle's behalf, even though earlier he said he was not going to help Angle. Following the match, which Angle won, Nash offered a hand shake to Angle only to be "flipped off" by the new champ. An enraged Nash demanded a match with Angle, but TNA Management's public face, Jim Cornette, instead booked Nash into a tag team match as Angle's partner against Sting and a partner of his choosing, with the stipulation being that the person gaining the pinfall or submission would be crowned the new TNA World Heavyweight Champion. After a red herring that Scott Hall was the mystery partner, it was revealed to be Booker T.

==== The Main Event Mafia (2008–2009) ====
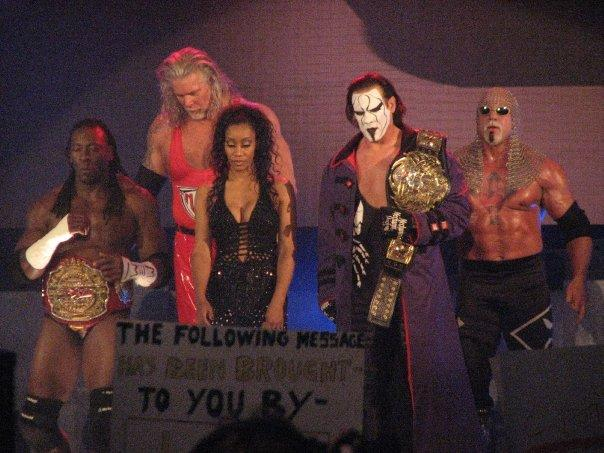
Nash with The Main Event Mafia

At Final Resolution on January 6, 2008, Nash and his partner Samoa Joe lost in a title match to TNA World Tag Team Champions A.J. Styles and Tomko after Nash abandoned and seemingly betrayed Joe. Yet on the following Impact!, when Joe stormed into Nash's locker room looking for a fight, Nash was actually able to persuade Joe into accepting his Machiavellian mentorship. Nash lost to Kurt Angle in a one-on-one match on Impact! with the winner qualifying for the Three Ways to Glory match at No Surrender on September 14. On the September 11 episode of Impact, prior to No Surrender, he seemingly parted ways with Joe on good terms. One month later, Nash returned at Bound for Glory IV on October 12 and in a swerve, struck Joe in the back with Sting's bat, helping Sting win the TNA World Heavyweight Championship, turning heel once again in the process. On the October 23 episode of Impact!, he formally joined Sting, Booker T, Scott Steiner, and Kurt Angle to create a villainous stable called The Main Event Mafia. He explained that he never forgave Joe for his scathing comments directed at his best friend Scott Hall's no-show almost a year prior, and befriending him was all part of a long-term plan to screw him out of the title. He then went on to defeat Joe at Turning Point on November 9. Nash, however, was removed from the card for Genesis on January 11, 2009, due to a staph infection, and was replaced by Cute Kip. Nash returned on the January 29 episode of Impact! when the Main Event Mafia took over the show. On Impact! on April 23, he began an on-screen relationship with Jenna Morasca, who subsequently began acting as his valet. At Slammiversary on June 21, he was reunited with Joe and helped Angle win the TNA World Heavyweight Championship.

At Victory Road on July 19, Nash defeated A.J. Styles for the Legends Championship, his first title in TNA. However, Nash lost the title on the July 30 episode of Impact! to Mick Foley. Under a month later at Hard Justice on August 16, Nash defeated Foley to reclaim the Legends Championship. At Bound for Glory on October 18, Nash lost the Legends Championship to Eric Young in a 3-way match, which also included Hernandez.

On the following episode of Impact!, after Angle announced the death of The Main Event Mafia and turned face, Nash also became a face as he began feuding with Eric Young and the World Elite. However, the following month at Turning Point on November 15, Nash helped World Elite members Doug Williams and Brutus Magnus retain their TNA World Tag Team Championship. On the following episode of Impact! Nash congratulated Young on outsmarting him at Bound for Glory and aligned himself with the World Elite, while also hinting at the return of the nWo once Hulk Hogan arrived in TNA, as when a paranoid Mick Foley came to him for information on who Hogan would be coming with, he facetiously suggested names such as Syxx-Pac, Scott Steiner, Buff Bagwell, and Scott Hall. Further suspicion was aroused to Hall's return when Nash said that he was getting "the band" back together, hinting at an nWo return. At Final Resolution on December 20, Nash took part in the "Feast or Fired" match and won the briefcase containing a shot at the TNA World Tag Team Championship.

==== The Band (2010–2011) ====
Nash in August 2010

On the January 4, 2010, special live, three-hour Monday night edition of Impact! Hogan made his debut in TNA, and Scott Hall and Sean Waltman made their return to the company to greet him. Nash, Hall and Waltman quickly reformed their alliance, but Hogan kept himself out of the group, claiming that times have changed. At Genesis on January 17, in their first match back together Nash and Syxx-Pac, who replaced Scott Hall in the match, were defeated by Beer Money, Inc. On the February 4 episode of Impact!, Hall and Syxx-Pac turned on Nash. At Destination X on March 21, Nash and Young faced Hall and Syxx-Pac in a tag team match, where The Band's TNA futures were on the line. Nash turned on Young and helped the Band pick up the victory, which finally gave them contracts with the company. On the March 29 episode of Impact!, Nash offered Young a spot in the Band, claiming that what happened in Destination X was just business and nothing personal. Young refused the offer and in the main event of the evening, teamed up with Rob Van Dam and Jeff Hardy to defeat the Band in a six-man tag team steel cage match. Nash gained a measure of revenge on Young by defeating him in a steel cage match at Lockdown on April 18. Later in the night, Nash replaced Syxx-Pac, who no-showed the event, and teamed up with Hall in a St. Louis Street Fight, where they were defeated by Team 3D. On the May 3 episode of Impact!, Eric Young turned on Team 3D and joined The Band. On May 4, at the tapings of the May 13 episode of Impact!, after TNA World Tag Team Champion Matt Morgan had been attacked by Samoa Joe, Nash cashed in his "Feast or Fired" contract, teaming with Hall, and pinned him to win the TNA World Tag Team Championship. Nash later named Young one third of the champions under the Freebird Rule. At the June 14 tapings of the June 17 episode of Impact!, The Band was stripped of the Tag Team Championship, due to Scott Hall's legal problems. The following day it was reported that Hall had been released from his contract with TNA. On the June 24 episode of Impact!, Nash and Young decided to part ways, as Nash intended to go after Hogan, whom he blamed for what had happened to Hall and Waltman, and did not want Young to get into trouble for it.

After Nash was unable to convince Hogan to re–hire Hall and Waltman and failed to secure a meeting with Eric Bischoff, he set his sights on renewing his feud with Jeff Jarrett, who claimed that Nash had tried to hurt TNA by bringing Hall and Waltman in. On the August 5 episode of Impact!, Sting, who had feuded with Jarrett prior to his 30-day suspension, returned to TNA and, together with Nash, beat down Jarrett, Bischoff and Hogan. On the August 26 episode of Impact!, Nash defeated Jarrett in a singles match, after an interference from Sting. The following week Nash helped Sting defeat Jarrett. After the match Samoa Joe aligned himself with Jarrett and Hogan and drove Nash and Sting away. At No Surrender on September 5, Jarrett and Joe defeated Nash and Sting in a tag team match, after Jarrett hit Sting with a baseball bat. On the September 16 episode of Reaction, Nash and Sting were joined by D'Angelo Dinero, who claimed to have gotten inside information from Bischoff's secretary Miss Tessmacher, that would suggest that Nash and Sting were right about Hogan and Bischoff being up to something. At Bound for Glory on October 10, Nash, Sting and Dinero faced Jeff Jarrett and Samoa Joe in a handicap match, after Hulk Hogan, who was scheduled to team with Jarrett and Joe, was forced to pull out due to back surgery. At the end of the match Jarrett abandoned Joe and left him to be pinned by Nash. At the end of the event it was revealed that Nash and Sting had been right about Hogan and Bischoff all along, as they aligned themselves with Jarrett, Abyss and Jeff Hardy. On October 13, 2010, Nash's contract with TNA expired and he announced his retirement from professional wrestling. His last TNA appearance was a taped broadcast on October 14, 2010, when Nash and Sting both announced they were walking away from TNA rather than being a part of Hogan and Bischoff's regime. In January 2011 Nash signed a new contract with TNA, but was granted a release before reappearing on television, after being contacted by WWE.

=== Independent circuit (2011–2018) ===
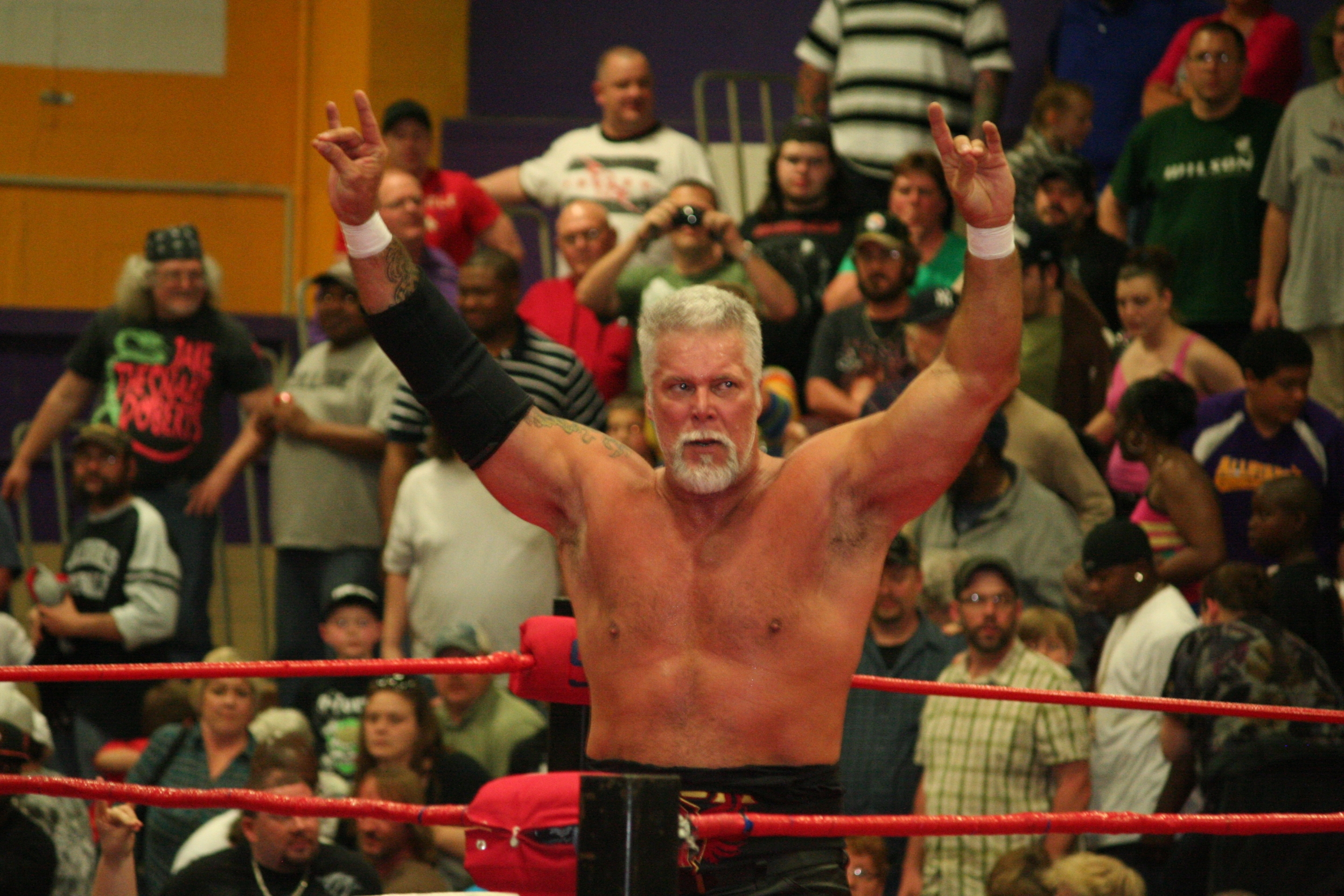
Nash posing after a match in April 2012

Nash along with Hall and Waltman made an appearance at the 2011 Gathering of the Juggalos. Nash teamed with Waltman for a win against Road Dogg and Billy Gunn.

On September 23, 2012, Nash made his debut for All Japan Pro Wrestling, teaming with Keiji Mutoh in a tag team match, where they defeated Seiya Sanada and Taiyō Kea with Nash pinning Sanada with the Jackknife Powerbomb for the win. Nash briefly signed with Global Force Wrestling as a "Legend" to help promote events and tours, making appearances at two GFW events on August 28 and 29, 2015. On August 10, 2018, Nash defeated Flex Armstrong for the Big Time Wrestling Heavyweight Championship. This would become his last match, confirming his retirement on January 5, 2020, to heal his body.

=== Second return to WWE (2011–present) ===
==== Feuds with CM Punk and Triple H (2011–2012) ====
On January 30, 2011, at the Royal Rumble, Nash, billed as Diesel for the first time since 1996, returned to the promotion, taking part in the Royal Rumble Match. He entered the match at number 32, but was eliminated by Wade Barrett. It was announced that he had signed a five-year WWE Legends contract. On April 2, Nash, along with Sean Waltman, was on hand to celebrate the induction of Shawn Michaels into the WWE Hall of Fame class of 2011. Triple H inducted Michaels, and after Michaels gave his speech, Nash and Waltman joined the two on stage to celebrate.

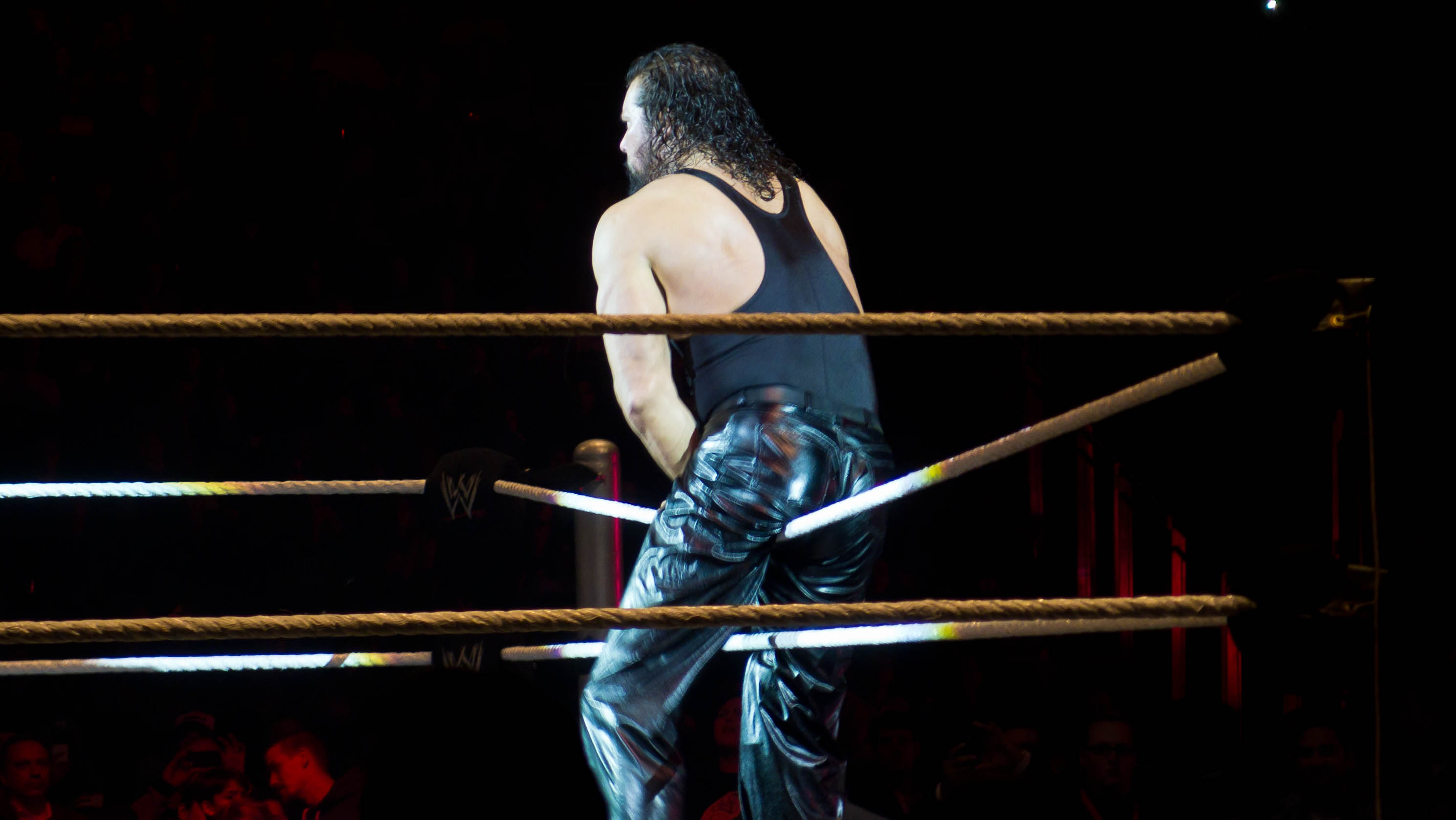
Nash entering the ring in November 2011

Nash, no longer billed as Diesel, returned at SummerSlam on August 14, attacking CM Punk after he became WWE Champion, which allowed Alberto Del Rio to cash in his Money in the Bank briefcase and win the title, thus turning heel. The following night on Raw, Nash claimed Triple H, on-screen chief operating officer of WWE, had instructed him by text to attack the winner. Punk verbally berated Nash on the microphone, so Nash attacked him the next week. He also distracted Punk in a match, making him miss out on a championship match. Nash was signed to an on-screen contract the next week by John Laurinaitis and demanded a match against Punk. After Triple H booked himself in the match against Punk instead, Nash attacked them both at a contract signing and was fired on screen. At Night of Champions on September 18, Nash interfered in their match, alongside The Miz and R-Truth. Triple H then attacked Nash with a sledgehammer before winning the match. Nash returned at Vengeance on October 23 to help The Miz and R-Truth defeat Punk and Triple H. After the match, he attacked Triple H with a Jackknife Powerbomb and attacked him again the following night with his sledgehammer, preventing him from receiving medical attention and taking him off television. The following Monday, on October 31, Laurinaitis again signed Nash to a new contract. He continued to appear on Raw SuperShow, attacking Santino Marella with a Jackknife Powerbomb and cutting promos about how Triple H was more of a boss than a friend. On the December 5 episode of Raw SuperShow, Nash competed in his first televised WWE match in eight years, defeating Santino Marella. Nash went on to face Triple H at TLC: Tables, Ladders and Chairs on December 18 in a ladder match with a sledgehammer hanging above the ring which he lost by pinfall after a sledgehammer shot to the face, ending the feud in the process.

==== Sporadic appearances and WWE Hall of Famer (2012–present) ====
In late 2012 and early 2013, Nash began appearing on WWE's developmental training show, NXT. Nash initially appeared as the guest Match Commissioner for the night, a title given to him at the request of Dusty Rhodes. After announcing this to the crowd, Nash was interrupted by Heath Slater to whom he promptly delivered his finisher, effectively turning face. Nash later again appear on the January 20 tapings of NXT to reunite with members of The Kliq, allowing him to effectively settle all issues with Triple H, embracing him once again. The reunion also turned into a reunion of D-Generation-X and Nash was awarded the title of being an honorary member of the stable. Nash then helped DX take down Damien Sandow.

Nash competed in the 2014 Royal Rumble match as the 14th entrant, eliminating Jack Swagger before being eliminated by Roman Reigns. He inducted his real-life close friend and former tag team partner, Scott Hall, into the WWE Hall of Fame class of 2014. Nash appeared on the August 11 episode of Raw to reunite the nWo with Hulk Hogan and Scott Hall as part of Hogan's birthday celebration. Nash was suspended by WWE on December 24, 2014, following his arrest, but was quickly reinstated when the charges were dropped.

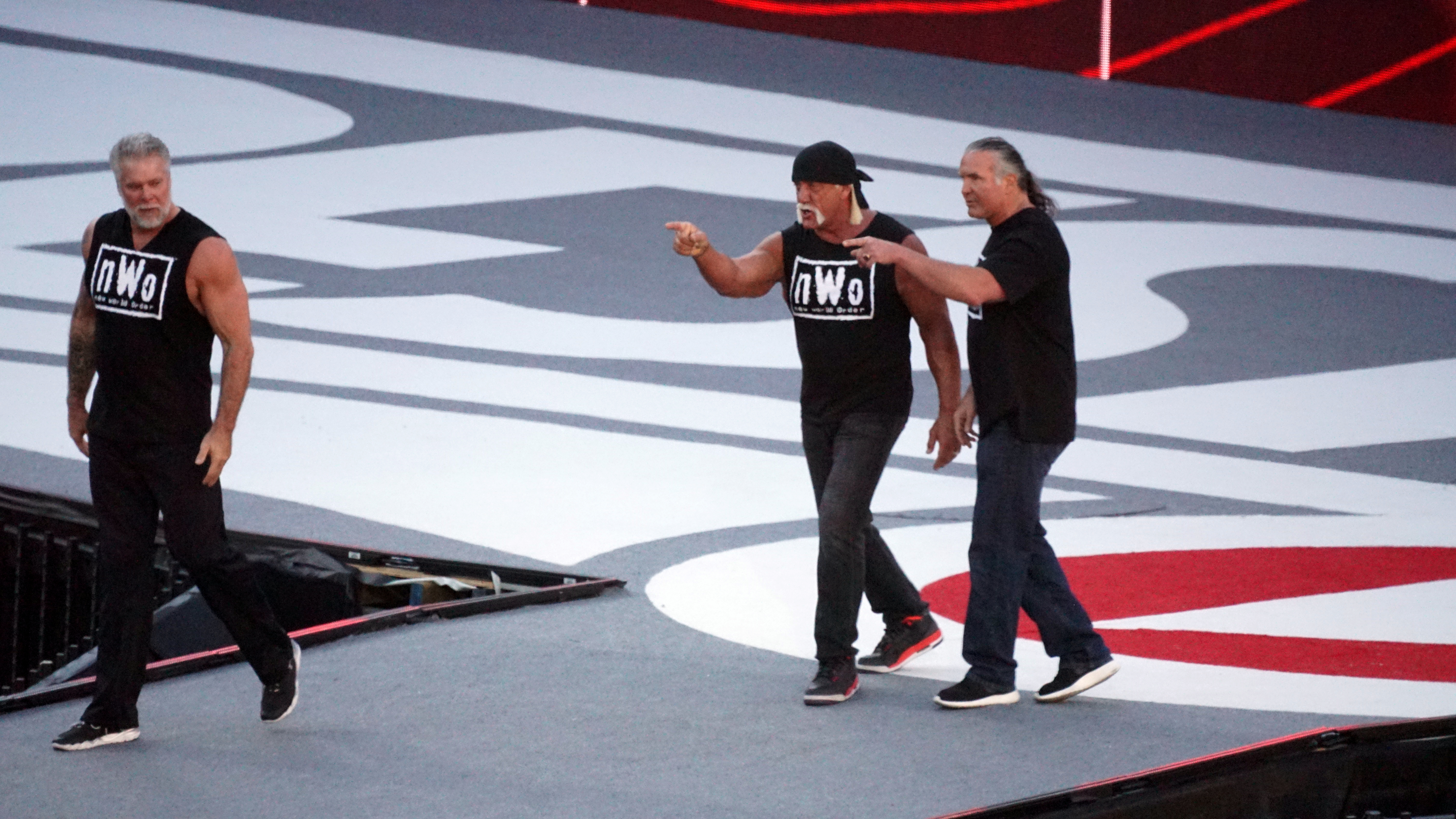
Nash (left) at WrestleMania 31 in 2015, alongside Hulk Hogan (middle) and Scott Hall, as the nWo

On the January 19, 2015 episode of Raw, Nash appeared with X-Pac and Scott Hall to reunite the nWo, and along with the APA and The New Age Outlaws, they beat down The Ascension, who had been insulting legends in past weeks. On March 23, 2015, it was announced that Nash would be inducted into the WWE Hall of Fame class of 2015. On March 28, he was inducted by long-time friend and Kliq member, Shawn Michaels. On March 29, Nash appeared at WrestleMania 31 alongside Hulk Hogan and Scott Hall, in their attempt to even the odds in favor of Sting in his match against Triple H, who had D-Generation X (Billy Gunn, Road Dogg, Shawn Michaels, and X-Pac) in his corner. However, Sting lost the match after Triple H hit him with a sledgehammer as he was attempting a Stinger splash.

Nash made a return to WWE for the Raw Reunion show on July 22, 2019. On December 9, 2019, it was announced that Nash would be inducted into the WWE Hall of Fame (2020 Class) for a second time as a member of nWo, together with Hogan, Hall, and Sean Waltman.

== Personal life ==
Nash and his wife Tamara married in 1988, separated in 2000, and later reconciled. Their son, Tristen, born on June 12, 1996, was a solo musician and poet. On October 20, 2022, Tristen died from cardiac arrest that had been triggered by a seizure as a result of alcohol withdrawal syndrome. He was 26 years old.

On March 2, 2016, Nash announced he will donate his brain to the CTE Center at Boston University and the Concussion Legacy Foundation after his death.

Nash is a supporter of the Democratic Party and considers himself to be a centrist Democrat. Nash publicly supported the Kamala Harris 2024 presidential campaign. He has been outspoken about supporting gay wrestlers.

=== Legal issues ===
In May 2011, Nash was arrested for battery by assaulting a drunk man in a parking lot of a restaurant in Florida, while he and his wife Tamara were leaving. In June 2011, it was announced by prosecutors that Nash was clear of all charges against him, stating that he was only acting in self-defense, as the drunk man was trying to flirt with Nash's wife.

On December 24, 2014, just after midnight, Nash was arrested for battery against his 18-year-old son, Tristen. Two hours later, police were called back and Tristen was arrested for battery against Nash's wife, Tamara. On January 15, 2015, prosecutors announced that Nash would not face charges. Nash's lawyer maintains that Nash was only defending his wife the night he was arrested.

== Legacy ==
During his time as WWF Champion, Nash drew poorly and is often labeled as one of the lowest drawing champions of WWF. He has reasoned that in the mid-1990s nobody drew because professional wrestling was in a major recession due to the steroid scandal following the United States v. McMahon legal case.

Nash jumping ship to WCW in 1996 along with Scott Hall has often been cited as the main reason behind Vince McMahon's decision to start offering downside guaranteed contracts to all of his talent in order to avoid a mass exodus of his talent roster and compete with WCW. The decision proved to be a boon since it changed the salary structure for the WWF wrestlers and helped increase the pay scale for the industry. McMahon also acknowledged in 1998 that letting them defect to WCW made him start offering guaranteed contracts.

In his autobiography Controversy Creates Ca$h, former WCW President Eric Bischoff praised Kevin Nash and Scott Hall for contributing to the key elements of the nWo's feel and attitude, while others have said that many of the booking ideas that propelled WCW's rise came from Nash and Hall. Veteran wrestler "Macho Man" Randy Savage credited Nash for spearheading the nWo Wolfpac faction in 1998 which grew in popularity with the fans and became the company's hottest selling merchandise.

== Other media ==
In 1991, Nash made his acting debut in Teenage Mutant Ninja Turtles II: The Secret of the Ooze as the genetically enhanced version of the villain, Shredder, called the Super Shredder. He also had a very minor role as a jackhammer worker in the 1998 movie Family Plan.

In 1999, Nash created and co-wrote a comic book titled Nash, set in a dystopian future and featuring himself as the primary character. Image Comics published an ashcan preview edition and two regular issues.

He was the first choice for the role of Sabretooth in X-Men, but the role ultimately went to his former tag team partner Tyler Mane. Nash appeared in a fight scene as The Russian in the 2004 film The Punisher. While filming the scene, Nash was accidentally stabbed with a real knife by actor Thomas Jane.

He made guest appearances in three different TV shows. He appeared on one episode each of The Love Boat: The Next Wave (episode "Captains Courageous") and Sabrina, the Teenage Witch (episode "The Crucible") and in two episodes of Nikki as The Big Easy (episodes "Gimme Shelter" and "Stealing Nikki"). In 2009, he appeared on Fox's show Brothers, in which he came to get his stolen championship belt back. In 2012, he played a male stripper in Magic Mike and reprised the role in the 2015 sequel Magic Mike XXL. In 2017, he appeared as Big Hank Cramblin on Detroiters.

In the spring of 2022, Nash launched a weekly podcast called Kliq This.

== Filmography ==
Film
Year	Film	Role	Notes
1991	Teenage Mutant Ninja Turtles II: The Secret of the Ooze	Super Shredder	
1992	Freejack	Extra	
1997	Aar Ya Paar	Diesel (uncredited)	
1998	Black Dog	Norman	
1998	Family Plan	Jackhammer Guy	
2004	The Punisher	The Russian	
2005	The Longest Yard	Guard Engleheart	
2006	Grandma's Boy	Mover #2	
2006	DOA: Dead or Alive	Bass Armstrong	
2011	River of Darkness	Jayden Jacobs	
2011	Almighty Thor	Odin	Direct-to-video
2011	Monster Brawl	Colonel Crookshank	
2012	The Association	Gordon	
2012	Rock of Ages	Body Guard for Stacee Jaxx	
2012	Magic Mike	Tarzan/Ernest	
2012	The Newest Pledge	Merkhaus' Dad	
2014	John Wick	Francis	
2015	Magic Mike XXL	Tarzan/Ernest	
2017	The Assault	Cisco	
2017	Slaw	Himself	
2017	Blood Circus	Santos	
2018	Klippers	Smith	
2018	The Manor	Reverend Thomas	
2020	Chick Fight	Ed	
2021	COVID:19 Invasion	Rex	
2022	Dog	Gus	
2023	Magic Mike's Last Dance	Tarzan/Ernest	

Television
Year	Title	Role	Notes
1992	Swamp Thing: The Series	Quixo	Episode: "The Old House of Mayan"
1992	Super Force	Lau	2 episodes
1997	Sabrina, the Teenage Witch	Giant	Episode: "The Crucible"
1998	The Love Boat: The Next Wave	Rocky Williams	Episode: "Captain's Courageous"
2000–2001	Nikki	The Big Easy	2 episodes
2004	The Wayne Brady Show	Himself	
2009	Brothers	Himself	Episode: "Snoop/Fat Kid"
2017	Detroiters	"Big Hank" Cramblin	1 episode
2017	Living the Dream	Troy Marshall	6 episodes

=== Video games ===
Video games
Year	Title	Notes
1994	WWF Raw	Cover athlete
1997	WCW vs. nWo: World Tour	
1998	WCW Nitro	
1998	WCW/nWo Revenge	Cover Athlete
1999	WCW/nWo Thunder	
1999	WCW Mayhem	
2000	WCW Backstage Assault	
2001	WWF With Authority!	
2002	WWE WrestleMania X8	
2002	WWE Road to WrestleMania X8	
2002	WWE SmackDown! Shut Your Mouth	
2003	WWE Crush Hour	
2003	WWE Raw 2	
2003	WWE SmackDown! Here Comes the Pain	
2008	TNA Impact!	Voice and motion-capture
2009	TNA Wrestling	
2010	TNA Impact!: Cross The Line	
2011	TNA Wrestling Impact!	
2011	WWE '12	
2012	WWE WrestleFest	
2012	WWE '13	
2013	WWE 2K14	
2014	WWE SuperCard	
2014	WWE 2K15	
2015	WWE 2K16	
2016	WWE 2K17	
2017	WWE Champions	
2017	WWE 2K18	
2017	WWE Mayhem	
2018	WWE 2K19	
2019	WWE 2K20	
2022	WWE 2K22	
2023	WWE 2K23	
2024	WWE 2K24	
2025	WWE 2K25	
2026	WWE 2K26	Cover athlete for Monday Night War Edition

== Championships and accomplishments ==
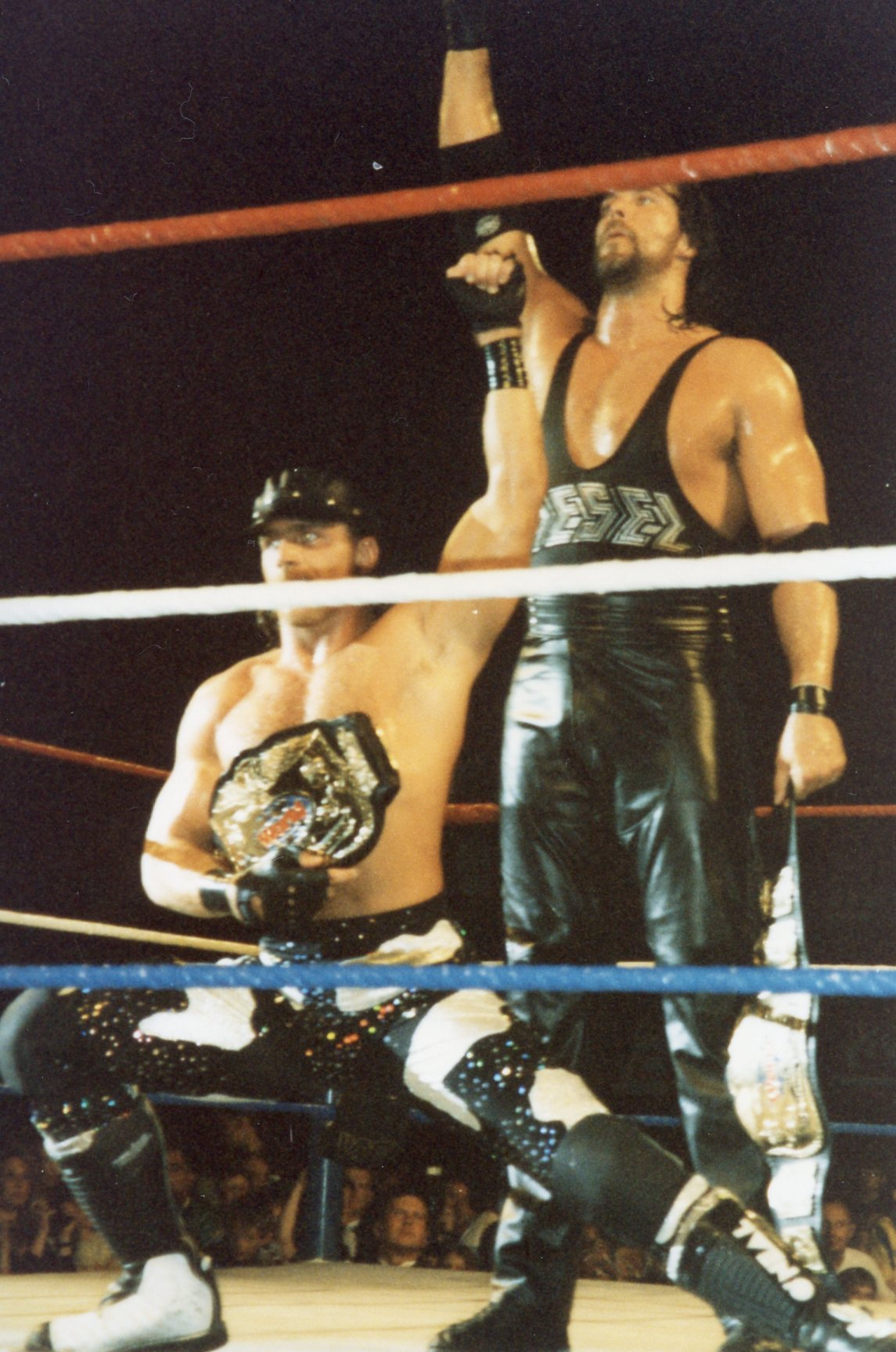
Nash (standing) is a two-time WWF Tag Team Champion – with both reigns being alongside Shawn Michaels (front)

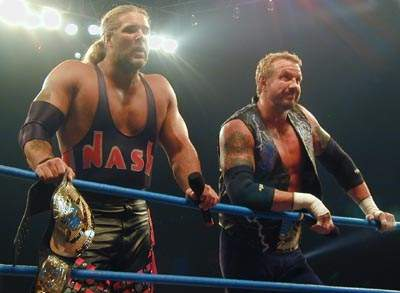
Nash (left) is a nine-time WCW World Tag Team Champion – with two of those reigns alongside Diamond Dallas Page (right).

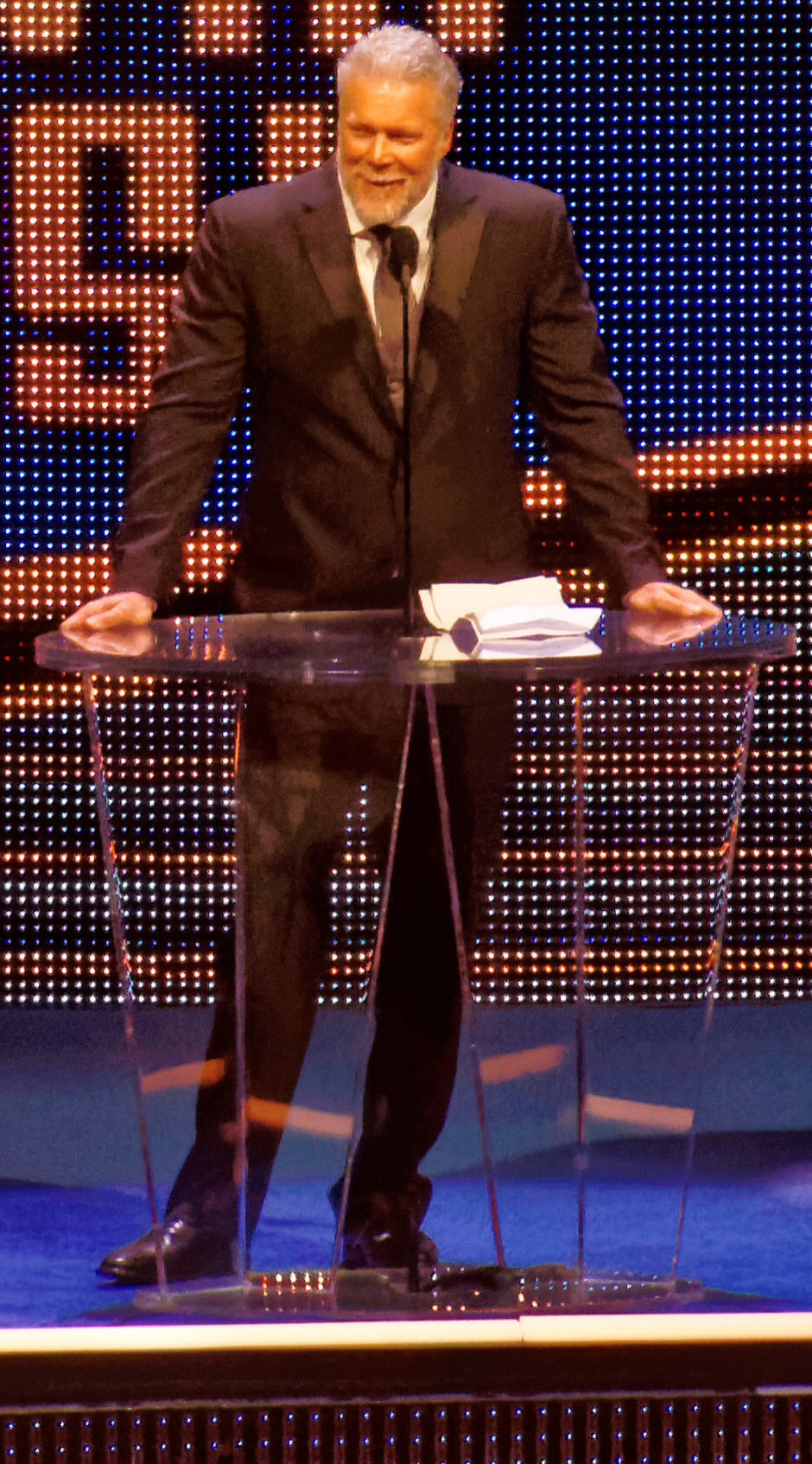
Nash is a two-time WWE Hall of Fame inductee – in 2015 for his individual career and in 2020 as a member of the nWo.

- Big Time Wrestling
  - BTW Heavyweight Championship (1 time)
- Covey Promotions
  - CP World Heavyweight Championship (1 time)
- Pro Wrestling Illustrated
  - Match of the Year (1995) vs. Shawn Michaels at WrestleMania XI
  - Most Improved Wrestler of the Year (1994)
  - Tag Team of the Year (1997) with Scott Hall
  - Wrestler of the Year (1995)
  - Ranked No. 1 of the top 500 singles wrestlers of the year in the PWI 500 in 1995
  - Ranked No. 59 of the top 500 singles wrestlers of the PWI Years in 2003
- Total Nonstop Action Wrestling
  - TNA Legends Championship (2 times)
  - TNA World Tag Team Championship (1 time) (Note: Nash defended the championship with either Hall or Young under the Freebird Rule.) – with Eric Young and Scott Hall
  - Feast or Fired (2009 – TNA World Tag Team Championship contract)
- World Championship Wrestling
  - WCW World Heavyweight Championship (5 times)
  - WCW World Tag Team Championship (9 times) – with Scott Hall (6), Sting (1) and Diamond Dallas Page (2)
  - World War 3 (1998)
  - Cannonball Champion of Spring Break (1998)
- World Wrestling Federation/WWE
  - WWF Heavyweight Championship (1 time)
  - WWF Intercontinental Championship (1 time)
  - WWF Tag Team Championship (2 times) – with Shawn Michaels
  - WWE Hall of Fame (2 times)
    - Class of 2015 – individually
    - Class of 2020 – as a member of the New World Order
  - Slammy Award (4 times)
    - MVP (1994)
    - Best Tag Team (1994) – with Shawn Michaels
    - Worst Tag Team (1994) – with Shawn Michaels
    - Most Predictable Outcome of the Year (2011) – Performing a powerbomb on Santino Marella
  - Third Triple Crown Champion
- Wrestling Observer Newsletter
  - Best Gimmick (1996) as a member of New World Order
  - Most Improved (1994)
  - Most Overrated (1999, 2000)
  - Readers' Least Favorite Wrestler (2000)
  - Worst Feud of the Year (2011) vs. Triple H
  - Worst Gimmick (1991) as Oz
  - Worst Wrestler (1999, 2000)

=== Luchas de Apuestas record ===
Winner (wager)	Loser (wager)	Location	Event	Date	Notes
Kevin Nash and Scott Hall (hair)	Rey Misterio Jr. (mask) and Konnan	Oakland, California	SuperBrawl IX	February 21, 1999	(Note: Manager Miss Elizabeth's hair.)
Chris Jericho (hair)	Kevin Nash (hair)	Grand Rapids, Michigan	Raw	August 18, 2003	

== Bibliography ==
- Davies, Ross (2001). Kevin Nash. The Rosen Publishing Group. ISBN 0-8239-3492-6.
- Hickenbottom, Michael; Feigenbaum, Aaron (2005). Heartbreak and Triumph: The Shawn Michaels Story. WWE Books. ISBN 978-0-7434-9380-2.
- McMahon, Vince (1995). And here comes Big Daddy Cool Diesel!. The WWF Publishing Group. ISBN 0-8239-3492-6.
