= Survivor Series (1995) =

World Wrestling Federation pay-per-view event

- Promotional poster featuring Diesel and Shawn Michaels
- Promotion: World Wrestling Federation
- Date: November 19, 1995
- City: Landover, Maryland
- Venue: USAir Arena
- Attendance: 14,500
- Buy rate: 135,000
- Tagline(s): Teams of Federation Superstars Battle it out! Who's fit to survive?

Pay-per-view chronology
← Previous; In Your House 4	Next → In Your House 5

Survivor Series chronology
← Previous; 1994	Next → 1996

The 1995 Survivor Series was a professional wrestling pay-per-view (PPV) event produced by the World Wrestling Federation (WWF, renamed WWE in 2002). It was the ninth annual Survivor Series event and took place on Sunday, November 19, 1995, at the USAir Arena in Landover, Maryland. The event centered on the Survivor Series match, a tag team elimination match that pits teams of multiple wrestlers against each other.

The pay-per-view broadcast consisted of six matches, and there was also one dark match before the event aired live. The main event was a No Disqualification match between Diesel and Bret Hart for the WWF Championship. Hart won the match and the title by pinfall, becoming a three-time champion and ending Diesel's 358-day reign, which was the longest of the 1990s. The undercard featured four Survivor Series matches as well as one standard singles match.

This was the first Survivor Series to take place on a Sunday, which was the Sunday before Thanksgiving in the United States, as each previous edition had taken place on either the eve or day of Thanksgiving itself. The company would not run another non-weekend pay-per-view event until Taboo Tuesday in 2004.

== Production ==
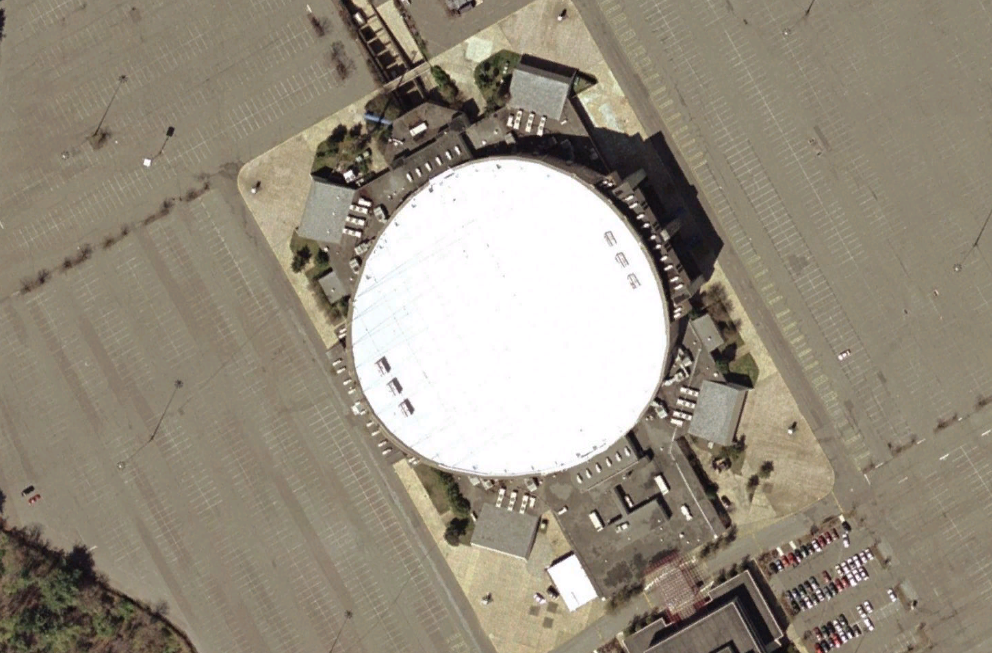
The ninth annual Survivor Series event was held at the USAir Arena in Landover, Maryland.

=== Background ===
Survivor Series is an annual professional wrestling pay-per-view (PPV) event, produced every November by the World Wrestling Federation (WWF, renamed WWE in 2002) since 1987, held around Thanksgiving in the United States. In what has become the second longest running PPV event in history (behind WWE's WrestleMania), it is one of the promotion's original four PPVs, along with WrestleMania, SummerSlam, and Royal Rumble, referred to as the "Big Four", and was considered one of the "Big Five" PPVs with the addition of King of the Ring in 1993. The event is traditionally characterized by having Survivor Series matches, which are tag team elimination matches that typically pits teams of four or five wrestlers against each other. The ninth Survivor Series event was scheduled to be held on Sunday, November 19, 1995, at the USAir Arena in Landover, Maryland. This was the first Survivor Series to take place on a Sunday, which was the Sunday before Thanksgiving, as each previous edition had taken place on either the eve or day of Thanksgiving itself.

=== Storylines ===
The professional wrestling matches at Survivor Series featured professional wrestlers performing as characters in scripted events pre-determined by the hosting promotion, the WWF. Storylines between the characters played out on WWF's primary television program, Monday Night Raw.

The main rivalry heading into the event was between Diesel and Bret Hart over the WWF Championship which Diesel had held since he defeated Bob Backlund three days after Backlund's win over Hart at the previous year's Survivor Series. At In Your House 4, Hart served as the guest commentator during Diesel's title defense against British Bulldog, Hart's former ally who had recently turned on the fans and aligned himself with Bret's brother and nemesis Owen Hart. Bret interfered in the match by attacking Bulldog. As a result, Diesel was disqualified and thus retained the title. This angered Diesel and he argued with Hart, resulting in the two brawling with each other. As a result of the circumstances, on October 30 edition of Raw, the WWF President Gorilla Monsoon signed a WWF World Heavyweight Championship match between Diesel and Hart to take place at Survivor Series. Diesel and Hart had faced off for the title two times before. At the 1994 King of the Ring, Bret defended against Diesel and lost by disqualification when his cornerman Jim Neidhart interfered to break up a potential pin. Earlier in 1995 at the Royal Rumble, Diesel made the first pay-per-view defense of his title against Hart, but the match ended in a no contest after Shawn Michaels, Owen Hart, and Backlund all interfered. With those two matches both ending in disqualifications, Monsoon added a No Disqualification stipulation to this rematch.

Another predominant rivalry heading into the event was over the Wildcard Survivor Series elimination match, pitting Shawn Michaels, British Bulldog, Ahmed Johnson and Sycho Sid against Razor Ramon, Owen Hart, Yokozuna and Dean Douglas. On the October 23 edition of Raw, the WWF President Gorilla Monsoon made the match to make rivals team with each other and teammates compete against each other, forcing Bulldog to compete against his allies in Camp Cornette. Ramon and Douglas had been feuding with each other since the September 11 edition of Raw when Douglas interfered in Ramon's match with British Bulldog. At In Your House 3, Douglas defeated Ramon in a standard wrestling match. On the September 25 edition of Raw, Douglas was made the #1 contender for Shawn Michaels' WWF Intercontinental Championship. A week before their match at In Your House 4, Michaels had been attacked in a club in Syracuse, New York. As a result, at In Your House 4, Michaels forfeited the title to Douglas. However, Douglas was forced to defend his newly won title against Ramon, who defeated Douglas for the title. Michaels and Sid's rivalry dated back to the February 20 edition of Raw, when Michaels introduced Sid as his new bodyguard for his WWF World Heavyweight Championship title shot against Diesel at WrestleMania XI. However, despite Sid's interference, Michaels was defeated by Diesel. As a result, on the April 3 edition of Raw, Michaels informed Sid that he was no longer needed. Sid became angry and he attacked Michaels by powerbombing him three times, putting Michaels out of action for six weeks. This led to an Intercontinental Championship match between Michaels and Sid on the September 11 edition of Raw, which Michaels retained by defeating Sid. Ahmed Johnson, meanwhile, entered into the discussion shortly after his debut on the October 23, 1995 edition of Monday Night Raw when he became the second person after Lex Luger to bodyslam Yokozuna, thus starting a rivalry with him.

The rivalry between The Darkside (The Undertaker, Savio Vega, Fatu and Henry Godwinn) and The Royals (King Mabel, Jerry Lawler, Isaac Yankem and Hunter Hearst Helmsley) dated back to the annual King of the Ring tournament, when Mabel defeated Undertaker in the quarter-final round. On the September 25 edition of Raw, King Mabel interfered in Undertaker's match with British Bulldog, setting up a match between Undertaker and King Mabel at In Your House 4. However, on the October 9 edition of Raw, King Mabel attacked Undertaker during a Six-man tag team match pitting Diesel, Shawn Michaels and Undertaker against Bulldog, Owen Hart and Yokozuna. Due to the attack, Undertaker was sidelined and was replaced by Yokozuna as King Mabel's opponent. On the November 6 edition of Raw, it was announced that Undertaker's The Darkside team would compete against King Mabel's The Royals team in a Survivor Series elimination match at Survivor Series.

Goldust made his WWF debut at In Your House 4, defeating Marty Jannetty. On the November 4 edition of Superstars, Bam Bam Bigelow interrupted an interview of Goldust, setting up a match between Bigelow and Goldust at Survivor Series.

== Event ==
Other on-screen personnel
Role:	Name:
English commentators	Vince McMahon
English commentators	Jim Ross
English commentators	Mr. Perfect
Spanish commentators	Carlos Cabrera
Spanish commentators	Hugo Savinovich
Interviewer	Todd Pettengill
Ring announcer	Manny Garcia
Referees	Mike Chioda
Referees	Jack Doan
Referees	Earl Hebner
Referees	Tim White

Before the event aired live on pay-per-view, the Smoking Gunns (Billy Gunn and Bart Gunn) defeated the Public Enemy (Rocco Rock and Johnny Grunge) in a non-televised match.

=== Preliminary matches ===
As the event commenced, the first match that aired was a four-on-four Survivor Series elimination match between the Underdogs (Marty Jannetty, Hakushi, Barry Horowitz and Bob Holly) and the Bodydonnas (Skip, Rad Radford, Dr. Tom Prichard and 1-2-3 Kid). Kid substituted for Jean-Pierre Lafitte on the Bodydonnas team and Holly substituted for Avatar on the Underdogs team. Underdogs scored the first elimination when Holly performed a flying crossbody on Prichard. Skip then eliminated Holly by pinning him with a roll-up. Kid performed a spinning heel kick on Hakushi, allowing Radford to pin him for the elimination. BodyDonnas suffered the next elimination when Horowitz pinned Radford with a small package. Kid performed a leg drop on Horowitz for the elimination. Jannetty then eliminated Skip by performing a Superbomb. Jannetty had dominated the match as he climbed the top rope to perform a high-flying move on Kid, but Kid's manager Ted DiBiase distracted the referee, allowing Kid's Million Dollar Corporation teammate Sycho Sid to interfere in the match and drop Jannetty to the ring. Kid then pinned Jannetty to win the match and become the sole survivor from Bodydonnas team.

The second match was a four-on-four women's Survivor Series elimination match pitting the WWF Women's Champion Alundra Blayze, Kyoko Inoue, Sakie Hasegawa, and Chaparita Asari against Bertha Faye, Aja Kong, Tomoko Watanabe, and Lioness Asuka. Blayze made the first elimination when she pinned Asuka after performing a German suplex. Kong then dominated the match as she eliminated Hasegawa by performing a belly-to-back suplex, Asari by performing a diving splash and Inoue by performing a seated senton, which she called the Banzai Drop. Blayze then dominated the opposing team as she eliminated Watanabe by performing a Piledriver and then eliminated opposing leader Faye by performing a bridging German suplex. Kong then performed an Uraken Punch on Blayze to win the match and become the survivor from Bertha Faye's team.

The next match was a singles match between Bam Bam Bigelow and Goldust. Goldust controlled most of the match against Bigelow while Bigelow performed poorly throughout the match and did not perform any high-impact moves that jeopardized his character during the match. Goldust eventually avoided a corner clothesline by Bigelow and performed a running bulldog to win the match.

The fourth match was a four-on-four Survivor Series elimination match pitting the Darkside (The Undertaker, Savio Vega, Fatu and Henry Godwinn) against the Royals (King Mabel, Jerry Lawler, Isaac Yankem and Hunter Hearst Helmsley). Undertaker controlled most of the match as he dominated Royals and made the first elimination by pinning Lawler after a Tombstone Piledriver. Undertaker eliminated Yankem next in the same way by performing a Tombstone Piledriver. Helmsley had to compete against Undertaker but he opted to escape the match. As he left the ring, he was chased to the ring by Godwinn, who came out to the ring with his slop bucket. As a result, Helmsley climbed the apron. Undertaker eliminated Helmsley by performing a chokeslam from apron to the other side of the ring. Mabel dominated Undertaker by performing a belly-to-belly suplex and a leg drop. However, Undertaker immediately sat up which scared Mabel and he escaped the ring and got counted out. As a result, the Darkside won the match with the entire team surviving.

=== Main event matches ===
The final match on the undercard was a four-on-four Survivor Series elimination match pitting Shawn Michaels, Ahmed Johnson, British Bulldog and Sycho Sid against Yokozuna, Owen Hart, the WWF Intercontinental Champion Razor Ramon and Dean Douglas. The tension arose between the two teams as heroes and villains were randomly distributed in both teams and the match was dubbed as a "Wildcard" match. The heroes and villains fought their own teammates as Ramon attacked his own teammate Douglas, allowing Michaels to eliminate him by pinning him with a roll-up. Sid was next on Michaels' team to dominate Ramon and grabbed him for Michaels to perform a superkick, which Michaels called Sweet Chin Music. Michaels tried to hit the move but Ramon ducked and Sid was hit instead, allowing Ramon to pin Sid for the elimination. Sid retaliated by performing a powerbomb on Michaels. Johnson would then control the match as he eliminated Hart by performing a sitout double underhook powerbomb, which he called the Pearl River Plunge. Ramon battled for his team and performed a crucifix powerbomb on Johnson, which he called the Razor's Edge. However, Bulldog tagged Johnson which meant that Johnson could not be eliminated. Ramon was distracted by Sycho Sid, 1-2-3 Kid and Ted DiBiase, allowing Bulldog to perform a running powerslam for the elimination. Yokozuna battled the opposing team as he was the remaining member on his team. Johnson powerslammed Yokozuna and tried to pin him but Bulldog broke up the pin to save his ally. This caused Michaels and Johnson to attack Bulldog. Michaels then performed a Sweet Chin Music on Yokozuna and Johnson performed a diving splash on Yokozuna to win the match. Michaels, Johnson and Bulldog survived on their team.

The main event was a No Disqualification match for the WWF Championship. Diesel defended the title against Bret Hart. As the match started, both wrestlers each untied a top turnbuckle. Hart focused on Diesel's knee and mainly attacked there. The action spilled to the outside where Diesel dominated Hart until the two returned to the ring, where Diesel tried to perform a jackknife powerbomb but Hart attacked Diesel's knee to get himself out of the move. Hart applied a figure four leglock on Diesel and then attempted to apply his submission maneuver Sharpshooter but Diesel attacked Hart's face and kicked him into the exposed corner. The match went back and forth with Hart repeatedly attacking Diesel's knee. The action spilled to the outside where both men attacked each other, with Diesel famously throwing Hart through the Spanish announcers table, until Diesel rolled Hart into the ring and tried to perform a jackknife powerbomb but Hart was almost knocked out and collapsed. Diesel tried to pick him up again for the jackknife powerbomb but Hart had been playing possum and hooked Diesel's leg and rolled him into a small package, getting the pin and winning the championship. An angry Diesel hit two jackknife powerbombs on Hart after the match.

== Aftermath ==
Several departures took place after Survivor Series. Bam Bam Bigelow left WWF after losing to Goldust at Survivor Series and joined ECW later in 1995. The WWF Women's Champion Alundra Blayze was booked for a rivalry against Aja Kong. On the November 27 edition of Raw, Kong and Tomoko Watanabe defeated Blayze and Kyoko Inoue in a tag team match. It would turn out to be Blayze's last appearance in WWF as she made a shocking appearance on the December 18 edition of WCW Monday Nitro and dropped the Women's Championship into a trashcan.

On the November 6 edition of Raw, it had been announced by Camp Cornette's (kayfabe) lawyer Clarence Mason that the winner of the WWF Championship match between Diesel and Bret Hart at Survivor Series would defend the title against British Bulldog. Since Hart won the title at Survivor Series, a title match was set up between Hart and Bulldog at In Your House 5. At In Your House 5, Hart defeated Bulldog to retain the WWF Championship.

Following the Survivor Series matchup, Diesel became a "tweener" saying that he would accept the support of fans who liked him, but didn't care about the fans that didn't. This attitude remained until shortly before In Your House 6 when Diesel lost a steel cage match against Bret Hart due to interference by The Undertaker. Not long after, Diesel broke ties with Shawn Michaels and remained a "heel" for the remainder of his WWF run.

Since 1-2-3 Kid had turned on Razor Ramon during his match against Sycho Sid by helping Sid win the match and join Million Dollar Corporation on the November 13 edition of Raw, Ramon and Kid began a rivalry. Marty Jannetty also got involved in the rivalry as he was screwed out of the victory against 1-2-3 Kid at Survivor Series during Underdogs versus BodyDonnas match. On the November 20 edition of Raw, Jannetty tried to attack Kid and his manager Ted DiBiase but received a Powerbomb by Sid. On the November 27 edition of Raw, it was announced that Ramon and Jannetty would compete against Kid and Sid in a tag team match at In Your House 5. At In Your House 5, Ramon and Jannetty defeated Kid and Sid when Ramon pinned Sid.

== Results ==
No.	Results	Stipulations	Times
1^{D}	The Smoking Gunns (Billy Gunn and Bart Gunn) defeated The Public Enemy (Rocco Rock and Johnny Grunge)	Tag team match	—
2	The BodyDonnas (Skip, Rad Radford, Dr. Tom Prichard, and 1-2-3 Kid) (with Sunny and Ted DiBiase) defeated The Underdogs (Marty Jannetty, Hakushi, Barry Horowitz, and Bob Holly) by pinfall	4-on-4 Survivor Series match^{1}	18:45
3	Bertha Faye, Aja Kong, Tomoko Watanabe, and Lioness Asuka (with Harvey Wippleman) defeated Alundra Blayze, Kyoko Inoue, Sakie Hasegawa, and Chaparita Asari by pinfall	4-on-4 Survivor Series match^{2}	10:01
4	Goldust defeated Bam Bam Bigelow by pinfall	Singles match	8:18
5	The Darkside (The Undertaker, Savio Vega, Fatu, and Henry O. Godwinn) (with Paul Bearer) defeated The Royals (King Mabel, Jerry Lawler, Isaac Yankem, and Hunter Hearst Helmsley) (with Sir Mo) by count-out	4-on-4 Survivor Series match^{3}	14:21
6	Shawn Michaels, Ahmed Johnson, The British Bulldog, and Sycho Sid (with Jim Cornette and Ted DiBiase) defeated Yokozuna, Owen Hart, Razor Ramon, and Dean Douglas (with Mr. Fuji) by pinfall	4-on-4 Survivor Series match^{4}	27:24
7	Bret Hart defeated Diesel (c) by pinfall	No Disqualification match for the WWF Championship	24:54
(c) / – the champion(s) heading into the match; D / – this was a dark match

=== Survivor Series matches ===
^1

Eliminated	Wrestler	Eliminated by	Method	Time
1	Dr. Tom Prichard	Bob Holly	Pinfall	5:17
2	Bob Holly	Skip	Pinfall	5:23
3	Hakushi	Rad Radford	Pinfall	8:10
4	Rad Radford	Barry Horowitz	Pinfall	11:26
5	Barry Horowitz	The 1-2-3 Kid	Pinfall	12:25
6	Skip	Marty Jannetty	Pinfall	15:02
7	Marty Jannetty	The 1-2-3 Kid	Pinfall	18:45
Survivors:	The 1-2-3 Kid			

^2

Eliminated	Wrestler	Eliminated by	Method	Time
1	Lioness Asuka	Alundra Blayze	Pinfall	1:41
2	Sakie Hasegawa	Aja Kong	Pinfall	3:58
3	Chaparita Asari	Aja Kong	Pinfall	4:25
4	Kyoko Inoue	Aja Kong	Pinfall	5:02
5	Tomoko Watanabe	Alundra Blayze	Pinfall	6:30
6	Bertha Faye	Alundra Blayze	Pinfall	7:11
7	Alundra Blayze	Aja Kong	Pinfall	10:01
Survivors:	Aja Kong			

^3

Eliminated	Wrestler	Eliminated by	Method	Time
1	Jerry Lawler	The Undertaker	Pinfall	12:19
2	Isaac Yankem	The Undertaker	Pinfall	12:50
3	Hunter Hearst Helmsley	The Undertaker	Pinfall	13:35
4	Mabel	N/A	Countout	14:21
Survivors:	Fatu, Henry O. Godwinn, Savio Vega, and The Undertaker (clean sweep)			

^4

Eliminated	Wrestler	Eliminated by	Method	Time
1	Dean Douglas	Shawn Michaels	Pinfall	07:30
2	Sycho Sid	Razor Ramon	Pinfall	16:18
3	Owen Hart	Ahmed Johnson	Pinfall	21:49
4	Razor Ramon	The British Bulldog	Pinfall	24:08
5	Yokozuna	Ahmed Johnson	Pinfall	27:24
Survivors:	Ahmed Johnson, The British Bulldog, and Shawn Michaels			
