= Monday Night War =

Era of professional wrestling (1995–2001)

The Monday Night War or the Monday Night Wars, was an era of mainstream televised American professional wrestling, from September 4, 1995, to March 26, 2001, in which the World Wrestling Federation's (WWF; now WWE) Monday Night Raw (later Raw Is War) and World Championship Wrestling's (WCW) Monday Nitro were broadcast opposite each other in a battle for Nielsen ratings each week. The ratings war is widely credited with causing the 1990s professional wrestling boom. It largely overlapped with the Attitude Era, a period in which the WWF used the term "WWF Attitude" to describe its programming from November 9, 1997, to May 6, 2002.

The rating war was part of a larger overall struggle between the WWF and WCW, originating in personal animosity between respective owners Vince McMahon and Ted Turner. The rivalry steadily escalated throughout the 1990s to include the use of cutthroat tactics and the defections of wrestlers and employees between the two promotions. Throughout the war, the WWF and WCW would both adopt different concepts and narrative techniques. Meanwhile, both companies would establish both formal and informal partnerships with Extreme Championship Wrestling (ECW), with ECW performers either appearing on WWF and WCW shows while still under contract, or outright leaving ECW to work for one of the other two companies.

While WCW was the dominant promotion for much of the mid-1990s, a variety of factors coalesced to turn the tide in the WWF's favor at the end of the decade, including a radical rebranding of their formerly family-friendly product into highly sexualized and violent shows geared towards older teens and adults. WCW ultimately ran into financial difficulties as a result of the amount of money they had promised wrestlers during a hiring binge in the early and middle part of the decade, which had been aimed at acquiring large portions of the WWF's talent roster. Behind the scenes, executives who had longed to see WCW removed from the Turner organization were eventually able to see that desire come to fruition after Turner Broadcasting's merger with Time Warner and their merger with America Online (AOL). With Turner no longer in control, corporate executives of the combined AOL Time Warner sold WCW's assets. Despite efforts to salvage the company, it was ultimately sold to McMahon, ending the Monday Night War.

In retrospect, wrestling commentators have come to see the Monday Night War as a golden age of professional wrestling, along with the 1940s–1950s and 1980s booms, with the competition between the WWF and WCW bringing out their best quality product both in terms of creativity and the performances of their wrestlers.

== Overview ==
The Monday Night War largely sprang from a rivalry between WWF owner Vince McMahon and WCW owner Ted Turner, dating back to an incident in the 1980s known as Black Saturday, when McMahon acquired a monopoly on all nationally televised wrestling broadcasts by purchasing a stake in Georgia Championship Wrestling (GCW), whose flagship show aired on WTBS, Turner's own superstation based in Atlanta, Georgia. Turner, displeased with McMahon's handling of programming on his network, pressured McMahon into selling his time slot to Jim Crockett Promotions, another wrestling promotion. As wrestling began to grow in popularity in the early 1990s, McMahon's World Wrestling Federation (WWF; now WWE) and Turner's World Championship Wrestling (WCW) – and, as a result, their programming – became a venue through which the business feud could continue, with each company working to drive the other out of business.

WCW dominated the ratings through much of the mid-1990s, as Turner's financial resources allowed the company to purchase the services of numerous high-profile WWF performers, including Hulk Hogan and Randy Savage. The company also drew casual fans' attention by filming events at popular tourist venues such as Disney's Hollywood Studios, and reached out to Mexican and Japanese wrestling fans through its cruiserweight division, which featured wrestlers from a diverse array of ethnic and racial backgrounds competing in matches featuring styles of wrestling popular in Latin America and Asia. Under the auspices of Eric Bischoff, WCW introduced a new, complex metastory involving the defection of multiple wrestlers to a rival organization called the New World Order (nWo). McMahon's controversial treatment of Bret Hart in an incident known as the Montreal Screwjob immediately precipitated Hart's departure from the WWF to WCW, alienating a large segment of the WWF's fanbase at the same time WCW came to employ virtually all of the established wrestling stars then in competition.

Throughout the late 1990s, the WWF began to rise in popularity after it rebranded itself as a more adult-themed, sexualized and violent product, a period in the company's history now referred to as the Attitude Era. The shift in programming helped lead the company to achieve mainstream success similar to the 1980s professional wrestling boom. Concurrently, many WWF performers became crossover successes: during this period The Rock would become very popular and then would embark on a successful acting career, while Mick Foley published a New York Times-bestselling autobiography; Stone Cold Steve Austin quickly became the company's most popular star and its flagship performer, and would be featured in mainstream media all over the U.S., from Nash Bridges to Dilbert. The heightened profiles of WWF wrestlers helped to draw the attention of both new and casual wrestling fans to the company's programming.

In the late 1990s, WCW's ratings began to suffer as fans grew tired of the nWo storyline, which many viewers perceived as having been allowed to go on for too long. Fans also responded negatively to several gimmicks intended to reinvigorate interest in the promotion, including the introduction of actor David Arquette as WCW World Heavyweight Champion. The company was able to briefly reinvigorate itself after the introduction of Bill Goldberg (known monymously as Goldberg), who was presented as an unbeatable force who won matches within a matter of minutes or even seconds. Goldberg quickly rose to stardom within the organization and became a crossover star similar to the WWF's performers, with appearances in commercials and music videos. However, a controversial backstage decision to end his winning streak, followed quickly by an anticlimactic match involving Kevin Nash and Hollywood Hogan – now known as the Fingerpoke of Doom – effectively killed WCW's credibility in the eyes of many fans, and the company was never able to recreate the initial level of popularity that it had enjoyed in the middle of the decade. Simultaneously, WCW experienced financial woes due to the amount of money it had promised wrestlers in their contracts in the early and mid 1990s. The company was ultimately unable to sustain itself while paying wrestlers their contracted salaries, and it went up for sale. The war ended with the sale of WCW's assets by its parent company, AOL Time Warner, to the WWF.

== History ==
=== Before the War ===
==== 1980–1987: Cable television ====
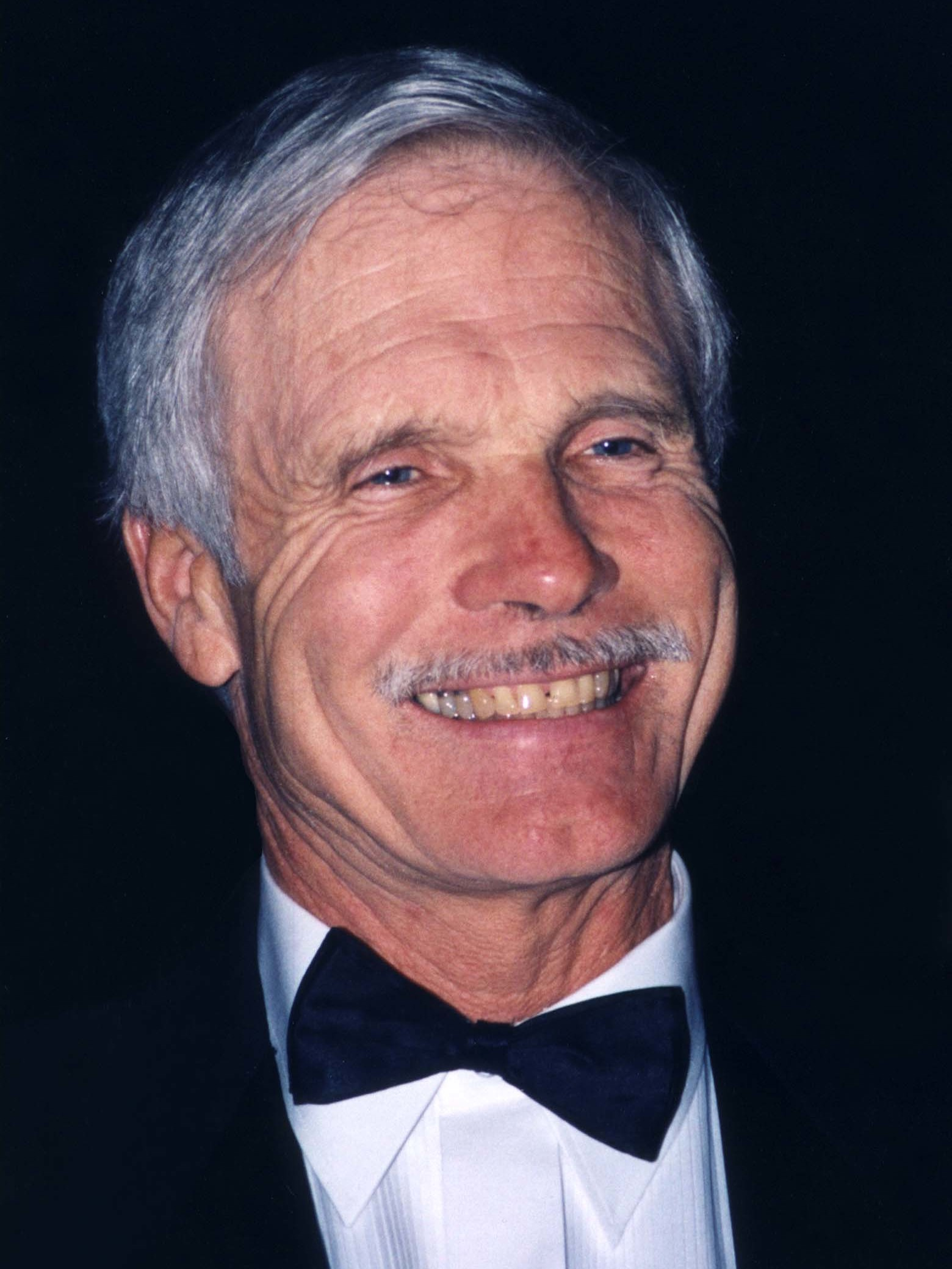
Ted Turner, owner of WTBS SuperStation

Television had been a significant part of professional wrestling presentation in the United States for decades. Still, after the 1950s, it had been relegated to local stations as the national networks ceased airing it. Many local programmers turned to professional wrestling as a means to fill out their schedules, as it was relatively inexpensive to produce but drew high ratings. This reinforced the then-accepted organization of professional wrestling, which were consisted of a patchwork of territorial promotions aimed at – and broadcast to – local audiences, without a centralized, national promotion. However, most territories were members of a common sanctioning body of championship titles, the National Wrestling Alliance (NWA).

As cable television arose in the 1970s, local stations were often retransmitted to new markets as superstations. When Atlanta television station WTCG (later WTBS, then WPCH) became a superstation in the late 1970s, Georgia Championship Wrestling (GCW), a member of the NWA that aired on the station, reached a national audience. GCW's television show, hosted by Gordon Solie, was recorded in one of WTBS's studios at 1050 Techwood Drive in downtown Atlanta. Shows were taped before a small live, in-studio audience, as were most professional wrestling television shows of the period. They featured wrestling matches, plus melodramatic monologues and inter-character confrontations, similar to the programming offered by other territories, including the Northeast-based WWF. GCW's show, which aired on Saturday evenings, was complemented by a Sunday evening edition. Jim Barnett, Jack and Gerald Brisco had major stakes in the organization, while Ole Anderson was head booker and was in charge of operations. In 1982, in order to appear less regional in scope, the television show was renamed World Championship Wrestling, a name Barnett had used for promoting shows in Australia in the 1970s.

In 1983, the WWF started its cable show called WWF All American Wrestling, airing Sunday mornings on the USA Network. Later that year, the WWF debuted a second cable show, also on USA, called Tuesday Night Titans (TNT), a late-night talk show spoof hosted by WWF owner Vince McMahon and Lord Alfred Hayes.

While still running steadily, Barnett and the Briscos sold their entire stock in GCW (including the television deal) to McMahon. On July 14, 1984 (otherwise known as "Black Saturday"), the WWF took over GCW. With this move, McMahon controlled all nationally televised wrestling in the United States. However, the WWF's show on WTBS was a ratings disaster, as GCW fans, disliking the cartoonish characters and storylines of the WWF, stopped watching. Two weeks after Black Saturday, WTBS debuted the show of a successor promotion to GCW created by holdout shareholders, Championship Wrestling from Georgia, albeit on early Saturday mornings.

Moreover, despite originally promising to produce original programming for the WTBS time slot in Atlanta, McMahon chose instead to provide only a clip show for WTBS, featuring highlights from other WWF programming as well as matches from house shows at Madison Square Garden, Boston Garden and other major arenas. This format would eventually be the cornerstone of the WWF Prime Time Wrestling (PTW) program. In May 1985, McMahon sold the WTBS time slot to another Southern-based and NWA-affiliated wrestling company, Jim Crockett Promotions (JCP), under heavy pressure from station owner Ted Turner, who was unhappy with the declining ratings. This set up a rivalry between McMahon and Turner that would continue for sixteen years.

That same year, "PTW" replaced "TNT" on USA Network, which expanded the format of the WWF's WTBS program to two hours. The most-remembered Prime Time format featured Bobby Heenan and Gorilla Monsoon introducing taped matches and analyzing them afterward, with Monsoon taking a neutral/babyface position and Heenan unashamedly cheering on the heels. The chemistry between Monsoon and Heenan made this show popular with fans for many years. However, it was not considered one of the WWF's "primary" shows for most of its history, and many other wrestling programs attempted to copy this formula, with varying degrees of success.

==== 1987–1993: Scheduling conflicts and Monday Night Raw ====
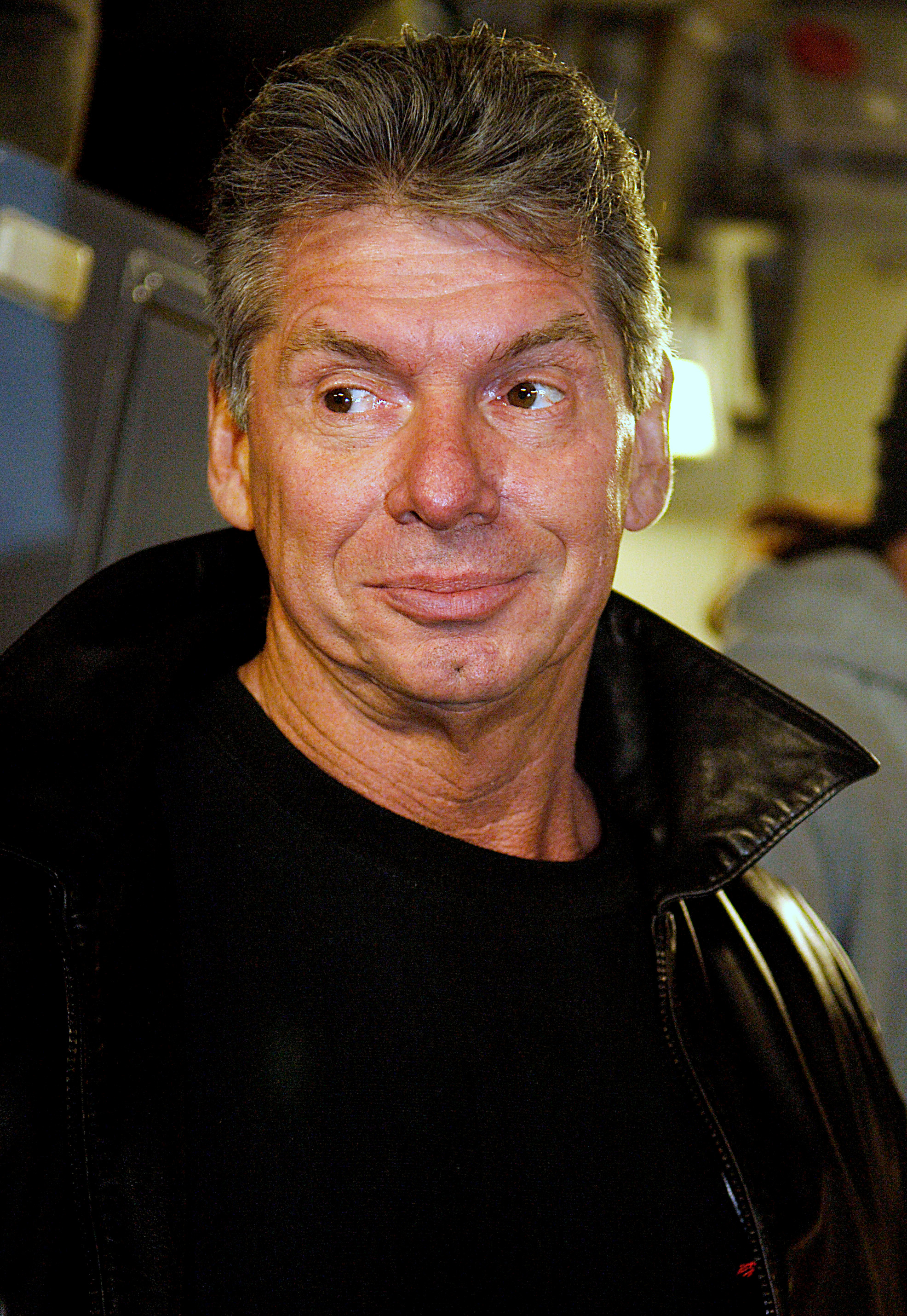
Vince McMahon, owner of WWF

During 5 months between November 1987 and March 1988, a bitter event-scheduling war broke out between McMahon and Jim Crockett, Jr., the owner of JCP. Throughout the 1980s, Crockett had steadily acquired other NWA-affiliated promotions in an attempt to consolidate his organization into a national entity similar to the WWF. As a result, the term "NWA" became virtually synonymous with JCP. On Thanksgiving night 1987, McMahon's WWF aired Survivor Series on PPV against the NWA's Starrcade, which Crockett marketed as the NWA's answer to WrestleMania. However, many cable companies could only offer one live PPV event at a time. The WWF then threatened that any cable company that chose not to carry Survivor Series would not carry any WWF PPV events for 60 days preceding and 21 days following the show. Therefore, the WWF PPV was cleared 10–1 over Starrcade, as only three cable companies opted to remain loyal to their contract with Crockett.

After this incident, the PPV industry warned McMahon not to schedule PPV events simultaneously with the NWA again. However, McMahon was still not willing to fully cooperate with Crockett. On January 24, 1988, another scheduling conflict took place between the WWF and NWA: the NWA presented the Bunkhouse Stampede on PPV, while WWF aired the Royal Rumble for free on the USA Network. Later that year, with WWF's WrestleMania IV around the corner, Crockett decided to use McMahon's tactics against him, developing his own PPV-caliber event and airing it for free on WTBS opposite WrestleMania. The result was the Clash of the Champions I. On March 27, 1988 – the same night as WrestleMania IV – the first Clash of the Champions aired. This show made Sting a star after he wrestled NWA World Heavyweight Champion Ric Flair to a 45-minute draw. The NWA repeated the practice the following year, with a Clash coinciding with WWF's WrestleMania V. Although the main event of the Clash saw NWA World Heavyweight Champion Ricky Steamboat defeat Flair in a best-of-three-falls match that lasted for almost an hour, ratings and attendance for the event fell well below expectations compared to WrestleMania V. Thus, the practice of conflicting major events would cease for six years.

By 1988, Crockett's acquisition spree had severely drained his coffers. As a result, he was forced to sell his company to Turner, through a subsidiary named Universal Wrestling Corporation, which wanted to retain the steady and strong ratings of the JCP wrestling programs. Turner named the company World Championship Wrestling (WCW) after the flagship TV show; it remained affiliated with the NWA until 1993.

As 1993 began, PTW was struggling in the ratings and was canceled by USA Network. The show that succeeded it, Monday Night Raw, changed how wrestling on cable TV would be presented. The WWF decided that it should use its cable time as a showcase for original matches and storylines that would serve as the major build-up to the quarterly pay-per-view broadcasts.

The original Raw broke new ground in televised professional wrestling. Traditionally, wrestling shows were taped on sound stages with small audiences or at large arena shows. The "Raw" formula was very different from that of "Prime Time Wrestling": instead of taped matches with studio voice-overs and taped chat, "Raw" was a show shot in front of a live audience, with storylines unfolding as they happened. The first episode featured Sean Mooney reporting from the streets of New York City and interviews by Bobby Heenan, Yokozuna defeating Koko B. Ware, The Steiner Brothers defeating The Executioners; WWF Intercontinental Champion Shawn Michaels defeating Max Moon; and The Undertaker defeating Damien Demento. The show also featured an interview with Razor Ramon.

Raw originated from the Grand Ballroom at the Manhattan Center, a New York City theater, and aired live each week. The combination of an intimate venue and live action proved highly successful. However, the weekly live schedule became a financial drain on the WWF, and the company began taping shows; sometimes up to a month's worth of shows were taped at a time.

==== 1993–1994: Eric Bischoff is put in charge of WCW ====
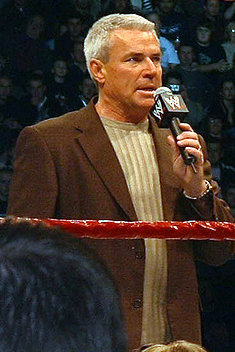
Eric Bischoff

In the same year as the premiere of Raw, WCW promoted former commentator and American Wrestling Association (AWA) announcer/sales associate Eric Bischoff to the position of Executive VP. During Bischoff's first year at the top of WCW, bookers Ole Anderson and Dusty Rhodes concocted cartoonish, unbelievable and poorly built-up storylines that were poorly received by fans, such as "Lost in Cleveland," a storyline in which Cactus Jack developed amnesia and disappeared in Cleveland, Ohio; the White Castle of Fear, a match between Sting and Vader themed around B movies meant to promote SuperBrawl III; and tongue-in-cheek, short beach-party movies used as promotional videos for Beach Blast. Anderson and Rhodes' booking style was generally in line with the lighthearted, morally uncomplicated narrative that had been popular in 1980s wrestling, but which was typically looked upon with growing disdain by younger wrestling fans.

In February 1993, longtime NWA stalwart Ric Flair returned to WCW after an eighteen-month WWF tenure, but since Flair was constrained by a no-compete clause from his WWF contract, WCW gave him a talk show segment on its programming called A Flair for the Gold. At Slamboree 1993, WCW reunited the Four Horsemen with Flair, Arn Anderson and Paul Roma. Ole Anderson was part of the group as an advisor but made only one appearance on A Flair for the Gold. A Flair for Gold would eventually play host to one of the most infamous incidents of 1990s wrestling: On a live Clash of the Champions XXIV building up the Fall Brawl pay-per-view, WCW decided to introduce a "mystery partner" for the babyfaces, a masked man known as The Shockmaster. The Shockmaster was supposed to crash through a fake wall and intimidate the heels. However, he tripped through the wall, fell on live TV, and briefly knocked off his helmet. The incident would be talked about for years to come in the burgeoning internet wrestling culture, and, along with WWF's Gobbledy Gooker, "Shockmaster" became wrestling parlance for an exceptionally poorly executed idea.

That same year, WCW began taping matches months in advance for syndicated programming like WCW WorldWide at the Disney/MGM Studios, which would become known as the "Disney tapings". The Disney tapings would ultimately prove disastrous to the company's reputation, largely due to WCW's underestimation of the growing internet culture. Because the events were recorded weeks, and sometimes months, in advance, fans in attendance had time to disseminate the results not only to wrestling magazines but also online. Seating at the events was also partially contingent upon wearing merchandise promoting different wrestlers, and audience members being made to respond on cue to particular in-ring events. This was regarded as a major breach of kayfabe at the time and ultimately led to WCW's departure from the NWA in September 1993.

By the end of the year, WCW decided to base the promotion around Ric Flair once again. The decision was largely made out of necessity: The company had intended to place heavy emphasis on Sid Vicious, but he was involved in a legitimate altercation with fellow wrestler Arn Anderson while on tour in England. A heated argument between the men escalated into a physical altercation, which culminated in them stabbing one another with a pair of scissors. Because Sid's attack on Anderson was more violent, and because of Arn Anderson's close relationship with Ole Anderson, the decision was made to fire Sid. Sid's departure resulted in a further problem for the company: As he had been scheduled to defeat Big Van Vader for the WCW World Heavyweight Championship at Starrcade 1993, several weeks worth of Disney Tapings had been filmed with Sid as the champion, with the intention not to air it until the following year. Sid's departure from the company meant that hours worth of footage had suddenly become worthless.

In 1994, Bischoff took a more aggressive stance as VP. He declared open war on the WWF and aggressively recruited high-profile former WWF wrestlers such as Hulk Hogan and Randy Savage, using Turner's funds. Due to their high profiles, Hogan and Savage were able to demand—and obtain—several concessions not typically afforded to wrestlers at the time. Notably, the men negotiated total creative control over their characters, in addition to multiyear, multimillion-dollar contracts at a time when many top wrestlers were only receiving around $1 million a year. Bischoff's concessions to Hogan and Savage would set a precedent for WCW's hiring process that would prove problematic in later years: As Bischoff began to aggressively pursue rival talent for jobs with WCW, performers—aware of the deals Hogan and Savage had been given—began to demand similar contracts, ultimately causing wrestlers' salaries to soar out of control. Concurrent with Hogan's arrival in WCW, he and Bischoff formed a close, real-life friendship that would afford Hogan a degree of influence over the day-to-day operations of the company.

WCW's first major PPV event since Hogan's hiring, Bash at the Beach, saw Hogan defeat Ric Flair for the WCW World Heavyweight Championship. The match was a reworking of a long-teased but never realized feud between the men while they were still working for the WWF: An intended main event match between them at WrestleMania VIII was changed to Hogan vs. Sid and Flair vs Savage, and the rivalry was never realized. Bischoff's attempt to deliver a "dream match" never produced by the WWF paid off, and the PPV drew a disproportionately high buy rate by the company's standards.

==== 1994: Eastern Championship Wrestling goes Extreme ====
ECW had its origins in 1991 as the Tri-State Wrestling Alliance, owned by Joel Goodhart. In 1992, Goodhart sold his share of the company to his partner, Tod Gordon, who renamed the promotion Eastern Championship Wrestling. When Eastern Championship Wrestling was founded, it was a member of the NWA, and "Hot Stuff" Eddie Gilbert was its head booker. After a falling-out with Gordon, Gilbert was replaced in September 1993 by Paul Heyman (known on television as Paul E. Dangerously), who had just left WCW and was looking for a new challenge. In contrast to professional wrestling of the time, which was marketed more towards families, Eastern Championship Wrestling was geared more toward adults and fans who craved a more athletic and violent wrestling product. Its eventual successor, Extreme Championship Wrestling, aimed its product at males between 18-35, breaking taboos in professional wrestling, such as blading. Heyman saw ECW as the professional wrestling equivalent to the grunge music movement of the early-mid 1990s, and focused on taking the company in a new direction.

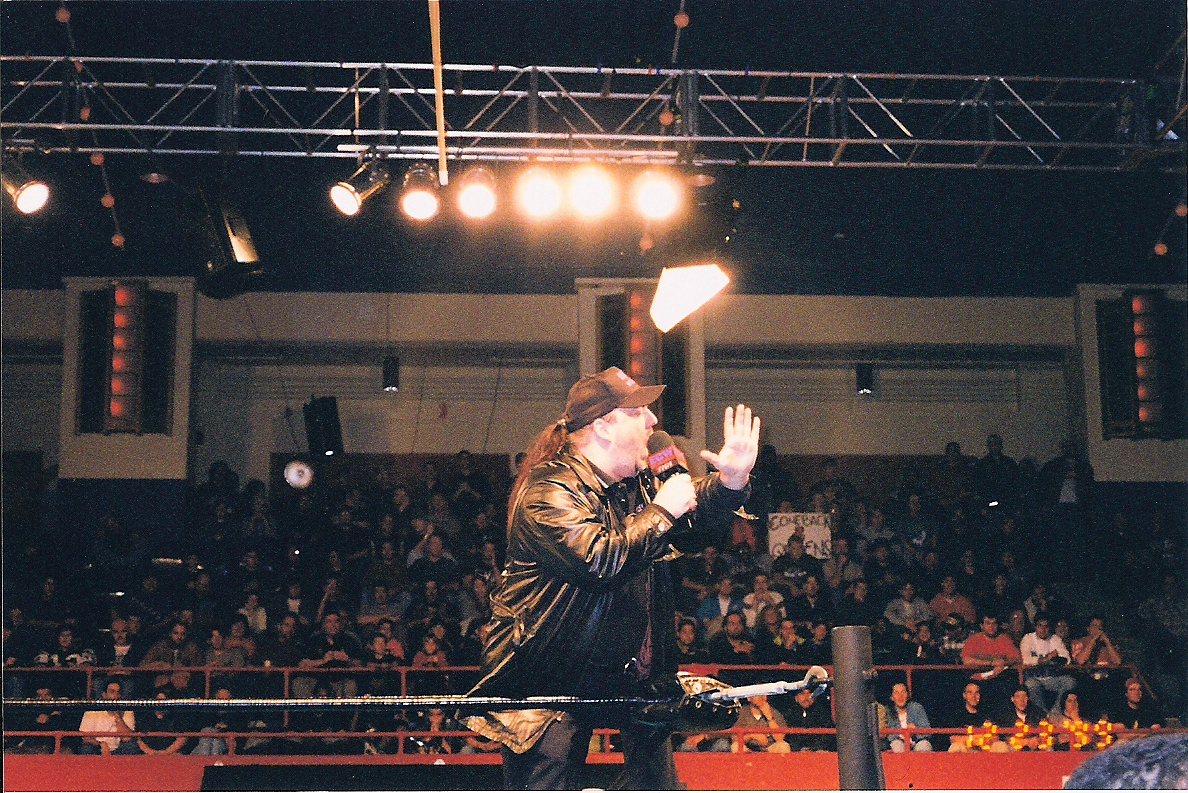
Paul Heyman focused on taking ECW in a new direction

In 1994, Jim Crockett Jr.'s non-compete agreement with Turner, to whom he had sold in 1988, expired, and he started promoting with the NWA again. Crockett went to Gordon and asked him to hold a tournament for the NWA World Heavyweight Championship, in ECW's home city of Philadelphia on August 27, 1994. NWA President Dennis Coralluzzo alleged that Crockett and Gordon were attempting to monopolize the title, and stated Crockett did not have the NWA board's approval, which resulted in Coralluzzo personally overseeing the tournament. Gordon took offense at Coralluzzo for his power plays. He contemplated a plan to secede ECW from the NWA in a controversial and public manner that would attract attention to ECW and insult the NWA organization. Gordon and Heyman planned to have Shane Douglas, who was scheduled to face 2 Cold Scorpio in the tournament finals, throw down the NWA World Heavyweight Championship upon winning it as an act of defiance.

Heyman pitched the plan to Douglas, noting that the only negative aspect would be that NWA traditionalists would view them as traitors to the tradition. Additionally, there was animosity between Douglas and Coralluzzo, who had publicly criticized Douglas and advised NWA-affiliated bookers not to schedule him for shows, as he believed Douglas was a "bad risk" and had the tendency to not appear at shows he was scheduled to wrestle at. Douglas ultimately decided to go through with Gordon and Heyman's plan, inspired by his father's motto of "doing right by the people that do right by you". He threw down the NWA World Heavyweight Championship, stating that he did not want to be the champion of a "dead promotion." He then raised the Eastern Championship Wrestling title. He declared it to be a world heavyweight championship, calling it the only real world title left in professional wrestling. When recalling this event years later, Paul Heyman stated the following:

The National Wrestling Alliance was old-school when old-school wasn't hip anymore. We wanted to set our mark, we wanted to breakaway from the pack, we wanted to let the world know that we weren't just some independent promotion.

With this event, Eastern Championship Wrestling seceded from the NWA and became Extreme Championship Wrestling. The revamped promotion's unorthodox style and controversial storylines made it popular among fans in the 18-35 male demographic. It showcased many different styles of professional wrestling, popularizing hardcore wrestling matches as well as lucha libre and Japanese wrestling styles. ECW was promoted as counterculture and a grittier alternative to multimillion-dollar organizations such as the WWF and WCW.

=== The Monday Night War ===
==== 1995–1996: Debut of Monday Nitro ====
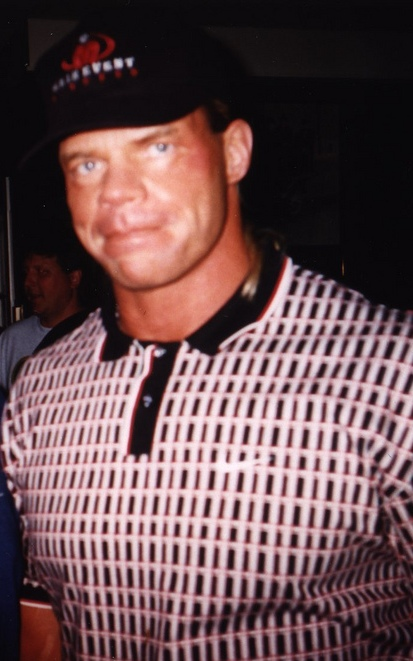
Lex Luger made his WCW return on the first episode of Nitro

Monday Nitro premiered on September 4, 1995 as an hour-long weekly show, and Bischoff was instrumental in the launching of the show. During their mid-1995 meeting, Turner asked Bischoff how WCW could compete with the WWF. Bischoff, not expecting Turner to comply, said that the only way would be a prime-time slot on a weekday night, possibly up against the WWF's flagship show Monday Night Raw. Surprisingly for Bischoff, Turner granted him one live hour on TNT (Note: Not to be confused with the aforementioned WWF TV show, Tuesday Night Titans.) every Monday night, which specifically overlapped with Raw. This format expanded to two live hours in May 1996 and later three. Bischoff himself was initially the host; he handled the second hour along with Bobby Heenan and former NFL football player Steve "Mongo" McMichael, with Tony Schiavone and Larry Zbyszko hosting the first. Other co-hosts included Mike Tenay (usually for matches involving cruiserweights or international stars), Scott Hudson, and Mark Madden.

The initial broadcast of Nitro also featured the return of Lex Luger to WCW. Luger had worked for the company from 1987 to 1992, when it was still affiliated with the NWA, before joining the WWF the following year. WCW's coup of obtaining Luger was significant for several reasons. Because Nitro was live at the time, premiering major stars on the show would signal to the fans the amount of excitement the broadcasts would contain. Secondly, Luger had just come off a successful run in the WWF and was one of the company's top stars. In fact, he had been in line to get the WWF World Heavyweight Championship (he had had several previous title matches), and worked a WWF house show the night before. Since nobody but Bischoff and Luger's good friend Sting knew that Luger would return to WCW, the shock value generated by his appearance was great. Thirdly, Luger's defection created speculation among fans as to which other big-name stars would "jump ship". Notably, Luger would be followed by former WWF Women's Champion Alundra Blayze, who appeared with the WWF Women's Championship belt on the December 18, 1995, edition of Nitro and insulted her former employers before throwing the belt in the garbage.

Raw and Nitro traded wins in the "Monday Night War" early on, but WWE has conceded that by December 1995 "WCW had the advantage over WWE in the storied Monday Night War." Nitro began airing a weekly segment entitled Where the Big Boys Play! composed of stock footage of matches featuring current WWF wrestlers who had started their careers as jobbers in WCW, all of which ended in the WWF wrestler suffering a humiliating loss. Bischoff also began to give away the results of Raw matches on Nitro, as Raw was usually taped a week prior to airing. These moves prompted retaliatory tactics by the WWF; in January 1996, Raw began airing skits before and after commercial breaks entitled Billionaire Ted's Wrasslin' Warroom, depicting parodies of Ted Turner ("Billionaire Ted"), Hulk Hogan ("The Huckster"), "Macho Man" Randy Savage ("The Nacho Man"), and "Mean" Gene Okerlund ("Scheme Gene"). While the material involving Hogan and Savage usually poked fun at their old ages, the skits aimed at Turner were decidedly more inflammatory in nature and contained material that could have been considered slanderous. Although Turner himself reportedly found the sketches amusing, the sketches stopped airing on the USA Network at the request of network president Kay Koplovitz, and were ended permanently in a short presented before WrestleMania XII, which killed off all the characters.

WrestleMania XII also began a brief turning point for the WWF, after which Raw would overtake Nitro for two consecutive months. The event saw the return of 1980s fan favorite "Rowdy" Roddy Piper, who made a face turn to fight Goldust. Another 1980s fan favorite returning that evening was Ultimate Warrior, who would go on to enjoy a brief revival in popularity. The main event, a heavily promoted ironman match between Shawn Michaels and Bret Hart, lasted for more than an hour.

==== 1996: The Curtain Call Incident ====
In April 1996, two of the WWF's top performers, Kevin Nash (Diesel) and Scott Hall (Razor Ramon), signed contracts with WCW. Prior to their departure, the men had been part of The Kliq, a tight-knit affiliation of wrestlers in the WWF whose backstage influence allowed them to wield an enormous amount of power over the direction of the company. The group, composed of Nash, Hall, Shawn Michaels, Hunter Hearst Helmsley (later known as Triple H) and Sean Waltman (1-2-3 Kid), often used their influence to advance one another's careers, and in some instances harm or ruin the careers of performers who displeased them. Accounts varied as to the reason for Nash and Hall's departure: Whereas wrestling analysts speculated that their contracts had been allowed to expire in order to break the Kliq's influence within the company, the WWF's official stance was that they could not match WCW's contract offer. On May 19, 1996, in their last WWF match before leaving for WCW, Nash and Hall were involved in a highly publicized incident at Madison Square Garden dubbed "The Curtain Call", in which four members of The Kliq (Nash, Hall, Michaels, Helmsley) broke character in the ring after their match to say goodbye to Nash and Hall (Waltman was in drug rehab and did not appear at the event). Michaels and Hall were playing babyface characters, while Nash and Helmsley were playing heel characters, and the four of them embracing saw an explicit breaking of kayfabe. Though the incident was not televised, it was nonetheless recorded by fans who had smuggled cameras and camcorders into the event, and photos and videos were widely disseminated on the internet. The incident marked one of the first times that pro wrestlers had so flagrantly broken character in front of an audience, and forced both the WWF and WCW to begin acknowledging fans' growing awareness of the backstage happenings of their respective companies. The Curtain Call would go on to influence the narrative course both companies took by encouraging WCW, and later the WWF, to blur the lines of fantasy and reality in wrestling, incorporating wrestlers' real names and details of their lives into their character's stories.

==== 1996–1997: WCW and the New World Order ====
On the Memorial Day 1996 edition of Nitro, Scott Hall interrupted a match and, apparently out of character, challenged the wrestlers of WCW to a fight against him and unnamed companions. Though Hall was employed by WCW, the storyline took advantage of fans' knowledge of the Curtain Call incident by insinuating that Hall's departure from the WWF had been a ruse and that he was, in fact, staging an "invasion" of WCW on behalf of the WWF.

Two weeks later, a second WWF defector, Kevin Nash (who had wrestled as Diesel), appeared on Nitro. Hall and Nash were dubbed "The Outsiders", and would show up unexpectedly during Nitro broadcasts, usually jumping wrestlers backstage, distracting wrestlers by standing in the entranceways of arenas or walking around in the audience. A week later, they announced the forthcoming appearance of a mysterious third member of their group. At Bash at the Beach, Hall and Nash were scheduled to team with their mystery partner against Lex Luger, Randy Savage, and Sting. At the onset of the match, Hall and Nash came out without a third man, telling Okerlund that he was "in the building", but that they did not need him yet. Shortly into the match, a Stinger Splash resulted in Luger being crushed behind Nash and being taken away on a stretcher, turning the match into The Outsiders vs. Sting and Savage.

Hall and Nash were in control of the match when Hulk Hogan came to the ring. After standing off with them, he attacked Savage, showing himself to be the Outsiders' mysterious third man and thus turning heel. In a post-match interview, Hogan christened his alliance with Hall and Nash as the New World Order (nWo). Hogan's statements, which broke with his earlier face persona, inspired enough vitriol in the audience that they began to pelt the ring with debris: a wayward beer bottle broke Okerlund's nose, and one fan jumped the security railing and attempted to attack Hogan.

The following evening on Nitro, most of WCW's top stars gave faux indignant interviews, expressing their feelings of betrayal and disappointment with Hogan's actions. The ensuing storyline, in which the nWo waged a campaign of anarchy against WCW, blurred the lines between reality and scripted entertainment, a unique presentation that acknowledged fans' growing awareness of backstage wrestling politics and kayfabe. WCW and the nWo continued to grow in popularity, and for the next 84 consecutive weeks Nitro beat Raw in the ratings.

At the outset of the storyline, the WWF filed a lawsuit against WCW, alleging that WCW was illegally representing the nWo as a WWF affiliate and that Hall's persona was too close to his "Razor Ramon" character (itself a parody of Al Pacino's character in Scarface), to which the WWF retained the rights. WCW countered that in June, Hall and Nash had emphatically stated on-camera that they were no longer WWF employees, and that Hall's current persona was, in fact, a reworking of his previous WCW character, The Diamond Studd. The lawsuit dragged on for several years, culminating in the WWF agreeing to drop the suit in exchange for the right to bid on WCW properties should they ever come up for liquidation.

==== 1996–1997: WWF struggles ====
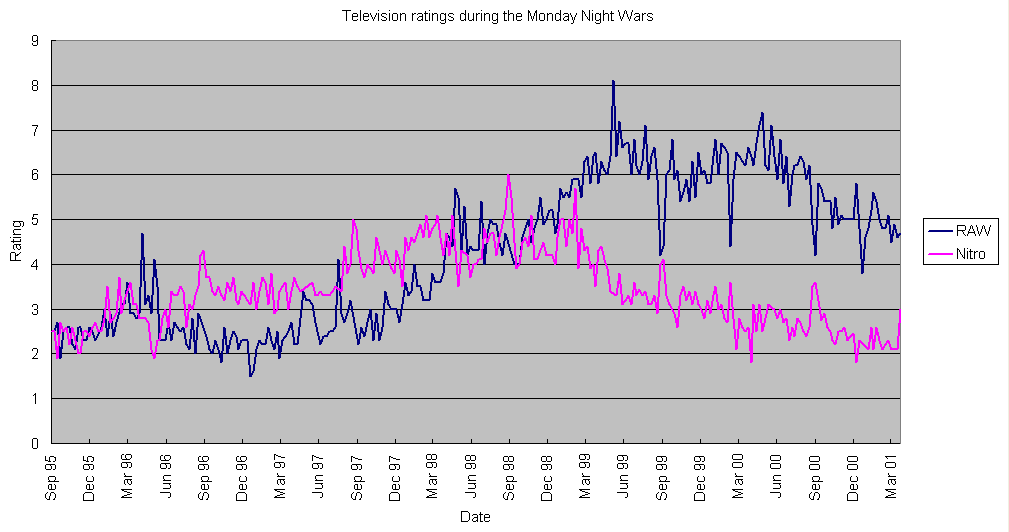
A television rating comparison for the period of the Monday Night War

Raw, and the WWF in general, was considered to be at a creative nadir before Nitro started. Into the mid-1990s, the WWF had continued the creative formula that had given the company success in the 1980s and early 1990s: clear-cut face vs. heel storylines, colorful wrestlers with themed gimmicks, and alluring female valets who nonetheless maintained a "PG-13" level of sex appeal. Although the formula had been popular during the MTV-fueled "rock n' Wrestling" era of the 1980s, fans in the 1990s began to gravitate towards more morally ambiguous characters, wrestlers whose personas were more grounded in reality, and metafiction storylines that acknowledged their awareness of backstage politics via the use of the Internet. With the introduction of the nWo, the June 10, 1996, episode of Raw would be the last rating victory for the WWF for nearly two years.

On the November 4, 1996, episode of Raw, the WWF aired a storyline involving Stone Cold Steve Austin and Brian Pillman, two former friends who were feuding with each other. In a series of vignettes broadcast from Pillman's real-life home in Newport, Kentucky, Pillman – supposedly debilitated following an attack by Austin – vowed to protect himself and his wife with the help of a group of friends should Austin appear. At the end of the evening, the final vignette depicted Austin breaking into Pillman's home, prompting Pillman to pull a gun on Austin, and the feed being "interrupted" in the ensuing chaos, with Vince McMahon (serving as a commentator) stating that he had been informed of "a couple explosions". When the feed resumed, Austin was shown being dragged out of Pillman's house as Pillman screamed, "That son of a bitch has got this coming! Let him go! I'm going to kill that son of a bitch! Get out of the fucking way!", with none of the profanity censored.

The angle polarized fans and shocked the USA Network, which was not accustomed to airing a program with the profanity and level of violence presented in the vignettes. Although the WWF (and Pillman himself) were forced to issue apologies to avoid Raw being canceled for breach of contract, the ensuing discussion of the incident in the fan community generated the most attention the WWF had received since the beginning of the Monday Night War. This prompted the WWF creative team to begin looking into the idea of more adult-oriented storylines and characters and mimicking WCW's metafiction elements. On February 3, 1997, Monday Night Raw changed to a two-hour format. In an attempt to break the momentum of Nitro, WWF entered into a cross-promotional agreement with ECW. Raw commentator Jerry Lawler insulted and "challenged" ECW on the show's February 17 episode, and in the weeks to come, several ECW wrestlers appeared on Raw in a story arc similar to the nWo storyline playing out in WCW, with the WWF pursuing the "renegade" ECW. On March 10, 1997, Raw was officially renamed Raw Is War in reference to the ongoing rating battle.

==== 1997: The Montreal Screwjob ====
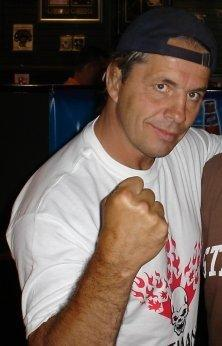
Bret "The Hitman" Hart left the WWF for WCW amid controversy

Throughout the 1990s, Bret Hart had been arguably the most popular wrestler on the WWF roster since winning the WWF Championship from Ric Flair in 1992, and one of the few performers to remain steadfastly loyal to the company through its numerous changes. After losing the title to Shawn Michaels at WrestleMania XII, Hart took a hiatus from the WWF, returning in late 1996 at the Survivor Series soon after signing a 20-year WWF contract. Despite hesitation, Hart agreed to turn heel at WrestleMania 13, becoming an anti-US, pro-Canadian character who would deride the morals of American wrestling fans in increasingly cheering for heel wrestlers, which later expanded into more political anti-American remarks. Though Hart became strongly disliked in the United States, this had no effect on his popularity in Canada or Western Europe where he remained a babyface. Hart's heel turn in the United States after WrestleMania 13 while remaining a face in Canada and Western Europe was another example of breaking new ground. From the point of view of Hart and the Canadian/European wrestling fans, it was the American wrestling fans that were the bad guys and whose morals had changed for the worse compared to previous years. Hart's feud against the aggressive, morally ambiguous yet patriotic Stone Cold Steve Austin, would dominate WWF storylines through most of 1997. During the year, as part of Hart's anti-US angle and his feud with Austin, Hart allied with his brother Owen Hart, his brothers-in-law The British Bulldog and Jim "The Anvil" Neidhart, and with close Hart family friend Brian Pillman, to form the new Hart Foundation.

Upon being told by Vince McMahon on September 22, 1997, that the WWF's current financial situation precluded the company from fulfilling his 20-year contract, Hart signed a contract with WCW on November 1, 1997, with the contract not taking effect until 30 days later. In the meantime, Hart would have reasonable creative control for his last 30 days with the WWF. At the time of signing with WCW, Hart was the WWF Champion, and wanted to part ways with the WWF amicably, and had agreed to vacate the title following a farewell speech on the November 10, 1997 broadcast of Raw Is War in Ottawa, Ontario, Canada, which would take place one day after the 1997 Survivor Series in Montreal. Although McMahon agreed to the arrangement, he later decided to renege on the deal and have Hart unwittingly lose the title at Survivor Series, to real-life rival Shawn Michaels. The incident, which took place in Hart's home country of Canada, became known as the Montreal Screwjob.

The incident severely demoralized the WWF roster, shaking wrestlers' faith in McMahon and resulting in a near strike the following evening, with Mick Foley (Mankind) actually going on strike for one day. Bret Hart's two brothers-in-law, the British Bulldog and Neidhart left with Hart for WCW, although Neidhart made one more appearance on Raw Is War as a quid pro quo before leaving, where Neidhart was beaten up by D-Generation X. Hart himself (who punched McMahon in the dressing room following the match in Montreal) prevented a mass strike by asking his former co-workers not to risk their careers for his sake. Bret's brother, Owen, also attempted to quit the WWF, citing a knee injury but was unable to get out of his contract. Owen Hart remained with the WWF until his controversial death at Over the Edge on May 23, 1999.

Rick Rude, a wrestler who had been popular amongst both fans and his fellow wrestlers during the 1980s and 1990s, who had recently made a comeback in the WWF and was one of the on-screen founding members of D-Generation X, left the WWF a week after the Montreal Screwjob, and followed Hart to WCW. As Rude was being paid by the WWF on an appearance-by-appearance basis, no extant contract prevented him from leaving the WWF without prior notice. Rude appeared on both the WWF's Raw Is War and WCW's Monday Nitro on November 17, 1997. A mustachioed Rude appeared on Nitro, which was live, and proceeded to criticize Vince McMahon, Shawn Michaels, DX, and the WWF, calling the WWF the "Titanic", thereby calling it a "sinking ship". An hour later on Raw Is War (which had been taped six days earlier), Rude then appeared with the full beard that he had been sporting during his last few weeks in the WWF, making Rude the only performer to appear on both Nitro and Raw on the same evening until the last night of the ratings wars. On top of this, Rude also appeared on ECW's Hardcore TV during that weekend (November 14–16 as the show was syndicated differently depending on the market). Rude made many appearances with ECW during 1997, including during the period when he was in the WWF as a part of DX, as the WWF and ECW often co-operated in terms of talent.

Bret Hart's departure from the WWF would ultimately turn the tide of the "Monday Night War." With Hart now on the WCW roster, Nitro boasted the most well-known names in wrestling; WCW had also been highlighting new talent, with up-and-coming stars such as Chris Jericho, Eddie Guerrero, Raven and Rey Mysterio, Jr. forming the company's new cruiserweight division. As many of the cruiserweights incorporated elements of lucha libre into their performances, the division also helped WCW take advantage of the popularity of wrestling amongst Hispanic, Latin American, and Asian fans. As few WWF performers at the time utilized the type of aerial techniques found in lucha libre, the cruiserweight division and the acrobatic performances of its wrestlers helped not only to draw in new viewers to WCW, but also helped the organization reach out to fans who were used to seeing such feats in wrestling performances in their native countries.

WCW's Starrcade pay-per-view in Washington, D.C. drew WCW's highest buyrate to that date, including the highly anticipated main-event of Hollywood Hogan vs. Sting, a match that fans had been waiting to see since Sting first appeared as the leader of an anti-nWo faction a year before. However, the anticlimactic end of the match proved unpopular: Bret Hart made his WCW debut by accusing the referee of corruption, declaring himself the referee, and then awarding the belt to Sting, only for it to be stripped moments later on a technicality. As many fans had waited for a decisive victory of one faction over the other, the convoluted sequence of events was seen as a way to artificially extend the storyline without allowing it to come to an organic conclusion, beginning a sharp decline in the popularity of the nWo angle amongst fans.

==== 1997–1998: Start of the Attitude Era, WWF overtakes WCW ====
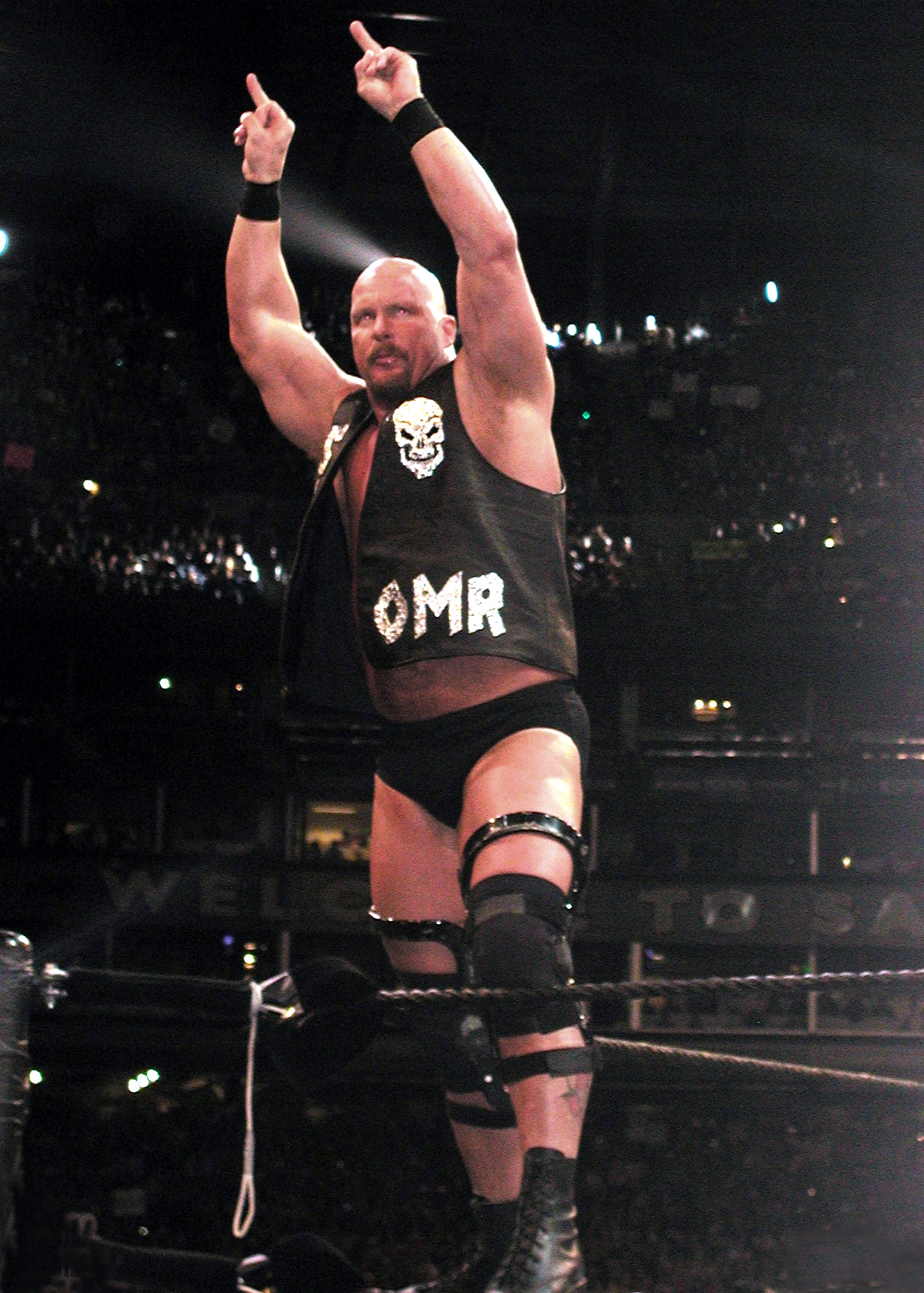
Stone Cold Steve Austin became a breakout WWF star of the 1990s

Throughout 1997, Raw Is War became increasingly controversial, and despite the company not securing any rating victories, the WWF gradually began receiving significantly more acclaim. Storyline elements included racist graffiti targeted at the Nation of Domination (a stable loosely based on the Nation of Islam), drinking beer on camera by Stone Cold Steve Austin, and emphasizing the sexuality of valets Sunny, Sable, and Marlena. These women began appearing on-camera in more revealing clothing and in swimsuit and lingerie-oriented spreads in the WWF's Raw magazine, a lad mag designed as an alternative to the family-friendly WWF Magazine and a competitor to the likewise family-friendly WCW Magazine. Although these elements helped to garner the WWF more attention than it had enjoyed in the wake of the nWo storyline, the injury of Steve Austin at the SummerSlam PPV, which put him out of action for 3 months, proved to be a severe blow to Raw Is War's popularity.

Despite losing to Nitro week after week, Raw Is War rallied in the ratings when it introduced its new "WWF Attitude" concept, in which the family-friendly and clear-cut face vs. heel dynamic of the 1980s to mid 1990s was jettisoned in favor of morally ambiguous wrestlers and adult-oriented, often heavily sexualized storylines. McMahon spearheaded the concept along with head WWF writer Vince Russo, who changed the way wrestling TV was written and constructed. Russo's booking style was often referred to as "Crash TV". Matches were shortened in favor of story-building backstage vignettes, with an emphasis on shock factor. Like WCW's nWo storyline, the WWF began to blur the line between real life and kayfabe: Vince McMahon, taking advantage of fans' genuine dislike for him following the Montreal Screwjob, recast himself as the evil Mr. McMahon, a corrupt businessman who despised his fans and valued sycophancy over talent. This presentation mimicked Nitro's "Anything can happen" atmosphere. It acknowledged the growing phenomenon of "smarks," wrestling fans who used the Internet to gain a wide base of knowledge on the real-life, backstage workings of the industry. In February 1998, media tycoon Barry Diller would also finalize his purchase of the USA Network. Shaun Assael and Mike Mooneyham's book Sex, Lies Headlocks:The Real Story of Vince McMahon and World Wrestling Entertainment stated that "the terrain shifted completely under everyone's feet" following Diller's purchase of the USA Network, which began in October 1997. It was also acknowledged that Diller's purchase of the USA Network gave sympathetic USA Network executive Bonnie Hammer to have more say regarding the WWF's status at the USA Network and that previous USA Network managing head Kay Koplovitz, who resigned from the network after Diller took over her Chairman and CEO posts on April 9, 1998, was in fact planning to remove WWF programming from the USA Network prior to the purchase. On April 13, 1998, Raw defeated Nitro in the ratings for the first time since 1996. In addition, Hammer collaborated extensively with WWF bookers such as Vince Russo.

Stone Cold Steve Austin would become extremely popular with the WWF's fanbase during 1997 and often receive the best fan response of the night, despite playing a heel character; many fans would start to see him as more of an anti-hero. During this time, many wrestlers' personas were retooled. Wrestlers who had been growing in popularity were given pushes, often with dark or morally ambiguous alterations to their characters: The Rock, who had failed as a babyface character named Rocky Maivia—a naive young athlete trying to live up to the athletic legacies of his grandfather and father—was recast as an arrogant jock who spouted catch phrases. Shawn Michaels, Triple H, and Chyna formed D-Generation X (DX), a rule-breaking, frat boy-themed stable of wrestlers who laced their vignettes with sexual innuendo and lewd gestures. Although an injury would cause Michaels to take a four-year hiatus from wrestling, the stable soared in popularity under the leadership of Triple H, who added the New Age Outlaws and Sean Waltman to the group's ranks. Waltman, who was a member of the nWo, had recently left WCW after wrestling there for a year and a half as Syxx (having been fired while recovering from an injury), and returned to the WWF as X-Pac. The Undertaker, then one of the company's longest-serving performers, had his gimmick changed for the first time in his career with the company during the Attitude Era: having performed from 1990 to 1998 as a revenant, his persona was first changed to a pseudo-Satanic cult leader in 1999, then to a "bad ass" biker persona in 2000. One of the few performers to have his gimmick changed to a lighter, sympathetic, and more traditional face persona was Mick Foley, who had been wrestling as the psychotic heel Mankind. Over several weeks, Foley engaged in a series of out-of-character shoot interviews documenting his career, the toll it had taken on his body and his marriage, and his youthful ambitions of being a popular wrestler with a hippie persona named Dude Love. The interviews proved immensely successful with fans, and Foley's popularity soared. Foley began alternating between characters, variously appearing as Mankind (whose character was tweaked from an insane asylum inmate to essentially Foley in a mask), Dude Love, and his former persona, Cactus Jack, an old western outlaw. The publication of the first of what proved to be a three-volume Foley autobiography, Have a Nice Day: A Tale of Blood and Sweatsocks, helped Foley and the company achieve mainstream success outside of wrestling circles as the book rose to #1 on The New York Times Best Seller List.

The night after the highly praised WrestleMania XIV, McMahon began a feud with fan-favorite Stone Cold Steve Austin. The rivalry, which was cast as a battle between blue collar redneck Austin and white collar executive McMahon, became one of the defining storylines of the Attitude Era, as each engaged in ever-escalating acts of sabotage and violence against the other. Austin's popularity would skyrocket even more with the company's fan base during this time. On April 13, 1998, an advertised Austin vs. McMahon main event was enough for Raw Is War to finally beat Nitro in the ratings for the first time in nearly two years. Two weeks later, the WWF taunted WCW's slipping ratings by sending members of DX to Norfolk Scope in Norfolk, Virginia in an attempt to crash a live taping of Nitro. The WWF was taping Raw Is War at the nearby Hampton Coliseum in Hampton, Virginia. Earlier in the day, Triple H and other wrestlers appeared outside the arena in military fatigues, challenging Eric Bischoff to come out and face them. A WWF camera crew videotaped the event for inclusion on Raw. Raw Is War's ratings began to rise steadily, bringing the "Attitude Era" to its highest point.

==== 1998–1999: WCW begins to struggle ====
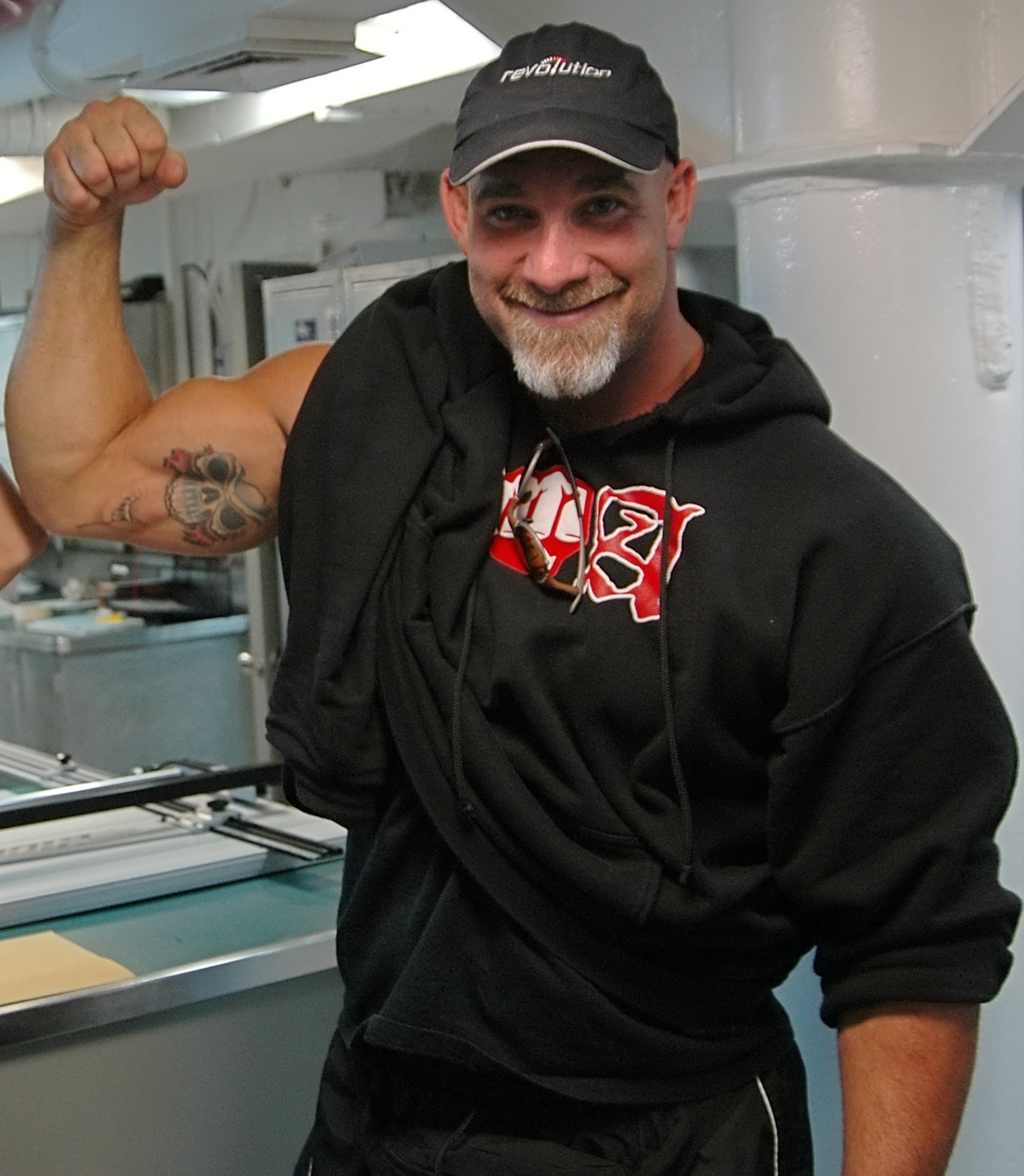
Bill Goldberg's winning streak helped WCW's ratings during 1998

Hoping to counter the McMahon/Austin feud, WCW divided the nWo into the Hollywood Hogan-led heel "nWo Hollywood" faction and the Kevin Nash-led face "nWo Wolfpac" faction. Although the Wolfpack proved popular with fans, the overall nWo storyline began to lose its appeal. As with the culmination of the Sting/Hogan match, fans grew tired of the lack of any resolution, as many matches between the groups ended in disqualifications when other members jumped into the ring to interfere, leading to all-out brawls. Ted Turner decided to expand the brand by introducing a second weekly program WCW Thunder, on his TBS channel. The introduction of Thunder troubled Eric Bischoff, who warned Turner that a second weekly program could potentially result in fan burnout, as viewing both programs would require five hours of weekly viewing time.

WCW attempted to regain ratings supremacy by marketing ex-NFL player Bill Goldberg as an invincible monster with a record-breaking streak of 173 consecutive wins. Goldberg proved to be very popular with the fans and enjoyed some crossover success in mainstream popular culture. On July 6, 1998, airing from the Georgia Dome in Atlanta, Georgia, Nitro defeated Raw Is War in the ratings when Goldberg pinned Hollywood Hogan to win the WCW World Heavyweight Championship. The match drew a 6.91 rating, the highest rating recorded in the rating war up to that time, and over 5 million viewers. However, the decision to stage the match on live cable television was questioned backstage at WCW: several employees felt that the match should have been the highlight of a PPV, where it could have generated more revenue. Vince McMahon also questioned the decision, as he was confused as to why his competitor would fail to make a move that could have greatly benefited WCW.

On August 10, 1998, WCW regained the lead for six weeks. During this time, WCW brought in Ultimate Warrior, now known simply as The Warrior, and then later reformed the Four Horsemen for Ric Flair's television return. WCW's final victory in the Monday Night War came on October 26, following the previous night's Halloween Havoc pay-per-view. The episode included a repeat airing of the Halloween Havoc WCW World Heavyweight Championship match between Diamond Dallas Page and Goldberg after the original airing exceeded the scheduled 3-hour running time and subscribers lost the feed at 11 p.m. EST.

In the fall of 1998, The Rock's popularity led to a main event lead babyface push, pitting him against Mr. McMahon in the build up to Survivor Series, leading to one of the biggest swerves in WWF history with The Rock turning heel and aligning with Mr. McMahon to form The Corporation upon winning the WWF Championship against Mankind.

Before this, the WWF's Austin/McMahon and WCW's Goldberg/nWo storylines would have each company trade victories. The Rock's leap into megastar status and subsequent feud with Mankind would give the WWF the lead, nearly doubling WWF ratings and PPV buys as 1999 began.

After winning the World War 3 battle royal in November 1998, with the help of Scott Hall and his stun gun, Kevin Nash ended Goldberg's 173–0 winning streak and won the WCW World Heavyweight Championship at Starrcade the following month.

==== 1999–2001: WCW's decline ====
As 1999 began, both shows consistently received Nielsen ratings of 5.0 or higher, and over 10,000,000 people tuned in to watch "Raw Is War" and "Nitro" every week. Wrestling gained newfound popularity as wrestlers made their way into mainstream media, appearing on magazine covers like Entertainment Weekly and TV Guide, and starring in commercials. By November 1998, however, the momentum would be in the WWF's favor for the remainder of the war. On January 4, 1999, Nitro broadcast live once again from the Georgia Dome. In the second of three hours, Eric Bischoff, who had learned of the results of the taped Raw Is War that was set to air that night, ordered commentator Tony Schiavone to make the following statement:

Fans, if you're even thinking about changing the channel to our competition, do not. We understand that Mick Foley, who wrestled here at one time as Cactus Jack, is gonna win their World title. Ha! That's gonna put some butts in the seats, heh.

Although the WWF had acknowledged the title change on their website six days previously, ratings indicated that, immediately after Schiavone's comments, 600,000 people switched channels from Nitro on TNT to Raw Is War on USA Network to see Mankind win the WWF Championship with the help of Stone Cold Steve Austin. After Mankind won the title, many fans then switched back to "Nitro" (which still had five minutes of airtime left), suggesting that WCW had a show the fans wanted to see and might have emerged the victor that night had they not revealed the "Raw Is War" results. The final ratings for the night were 5.7 for Raw Is War and 5.0 for Nitro. During the year following the incident, many WWF fans brought signs to the shows, saying, "Mick Foley put my butt in this seat."

This Nitro's main event was originally scheduled to be Goldberg vs. Kevin Nash for the WCW World Heavyweight Championship and was going to be their anticipated rematch. Goldberg was arrested during a mid-show storyline, however, and accused of "aggravated stalking" by Miss Elizabeth. He was released when Elizabeth could not keep her story straight. Meanwhile, Hollywood Hogan returned to WCW after a hiatus and challenged Nash to a match, which Nash accepted. When the match began, Hogan poked Nash in the chest with his finger, after which Nash dramatically dropped to the mat to allow Hogan to win the belt, an event that became known as the "Fingerpoke of Doom". It led to another heel turn for Hogan and the reformation of the nWo. The credibility of WCW, which did not present the match that had been advertised, was damaged. Despite the incident, WCW would continue this bait and switch tactic of booking until its demise in 2001. This "match" may have started the permanent ratings slide that was to follow for WCW, as Nitro – according to Nielsen ratings numbers listed by TWNPNews.com- – only got a 5.0 rating three times afterwards. Some dispute whether the Fingerpoke of Doom angle hurt WCW. According to TWNPNews.com, Nitro's Nielsen ratings on January 11, the week following the incident, once again reached 5.0. During the January 18 episode, however, ratings would fall slightly to 4.9, but would recover to 5.0 the following week. Its 5.7 Nielsen rating on February 8 (on a night when Raw was pre-empted by the Westminster Dog Show) was the last time it would get such a number.

Raw Is War was dominating Nitro to the point where WCW was making "quick fixes" to stem the tide, including hiring rapper Master P, bringing in Megadeth, Chad Brock, and Kiss for concerts, and conducting a contest to find a new member of the Nitro Girls (all ratings flops). On September 10, 1999, Bischoff was removed from power. Meanwhile, Raw Is War's numbers continued to rise; a match between The Undertaker vs. Stone Cold Steve Austin drew a 9.5 rating on June 28, 1999. It currently stands as the highest-rated segment in WWE Raw history.

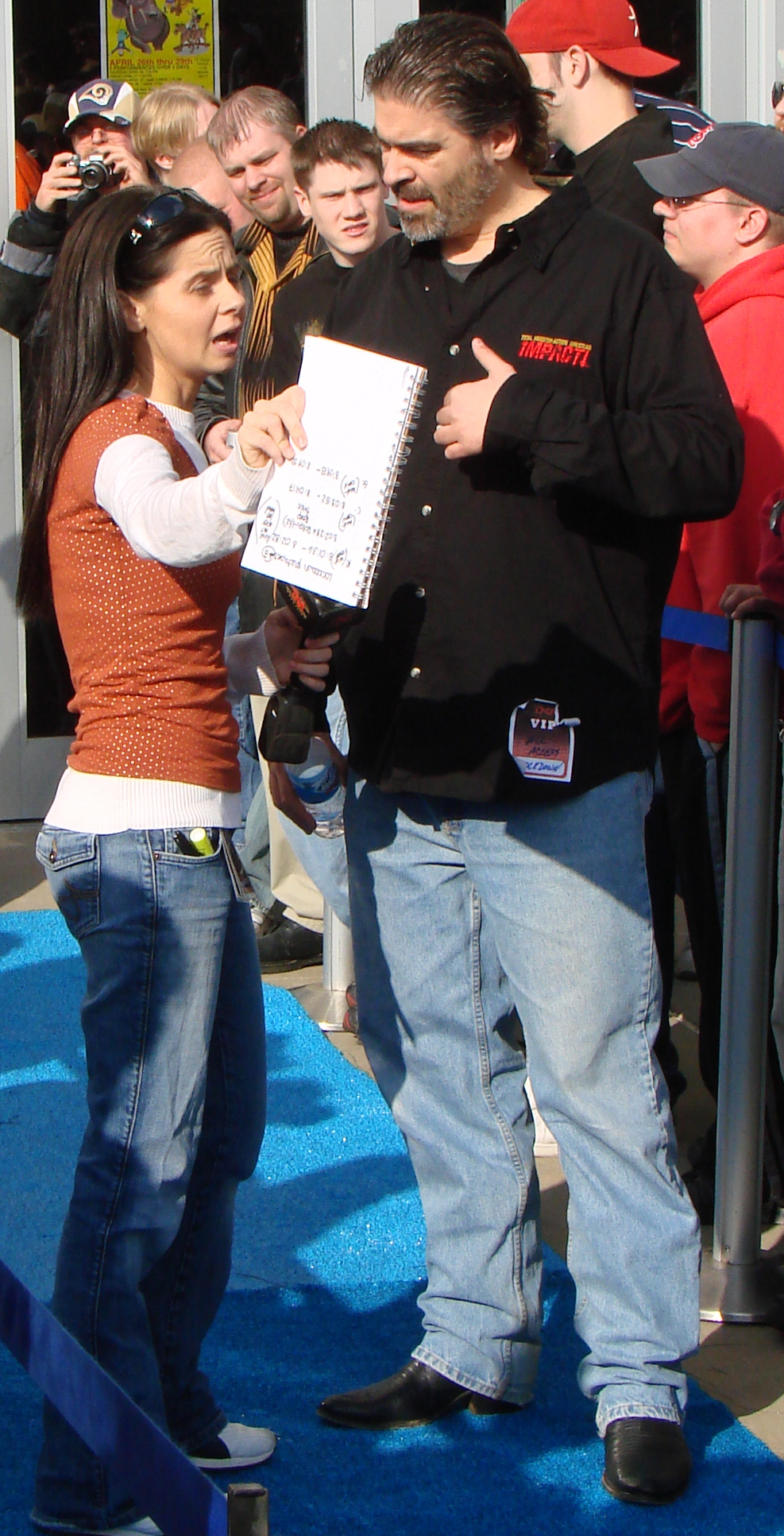
Former WWF writer Vince Russo, whose controversial booking style and management in WCW was heavily criticized

On October 5, 1999, Vince Russo and Ed Ferrara, the head writers of WWF television programs, signed with WCW and were immediately replaced in the WWF by Chris Kreski. Russo and Ferrara contend that their reasons for leaving the WWF were a dispute with Vince McMahon over the increased workload that they were facing, with the introduction of the new SmackDown! broadcast, an attempt by WWF to compete with WCW's Thunder broadcast on Thursday nights; they initially became known as "The Powers That Be", unseen management figures. Ferrara even became an on-air parody of Jim Ross, named "Oklahoma", who mocked Ross's Bell's Palsy. However, Russo and Ferrara failed to replicate their success in the WWF.

In December 1999, Bret Hart suffered a career-ending concussion during a match with Goldberg at Starrcade. WCW was entering severe financial and creative lows. Nitro's ratings failed to increase, and in January 2000, both Russo and Ferrara were suspended from WCW after they considered putting the WCW World title on Tank Abbott. The subsequent promotion of Kevin Sullivan to head booker caused an uproar among WCW's wrestlers. Despite winning the WCW World Heavyweight Championship at Souled Out, Chris Benoit quit in protest, along with Eddie Guerrero, Perry Saturn, and Dean Malenko. All four of them entered the WWF as The Radicalz, debuting on Raw Is War's January 31 episode—15 days after Benoit's title win. Nitro was cut to two hours beginning with the edition of January 3, 2000 (with the first hour running unopposed and the second hour competing against Raw Is War) to bolster the aggregate ratings score. Still, the elimination of the third hour did not mean higher ratings for Nitro, which by April averaged around a 2.5 (while Raw Is War drew more than double that amount).

In April 2000, WCW hired the reigning ECW World Heavyweight Champion Mike Awesome, who left ECW over a contract dispute. His appearance on WCW television led to legal threats from ECW owner Paul Heyman. A compromise was reached, which resulted in Awesome losing the title at an ECW event to Tazz, who was formerly of ECW and at the time contracted to the WWF. Tazz would later appear on WWF programming with the title. The WWF used this as a symbolic demonstration of superiority over WCW. On April 10, 2000, Bischoff (now a creative consultant) and Russo returned with equal power to work as a team and attempted to reboot WCW by vacating all of the promotion's titles. Bischoff was allowed back with booking powers, but he no longer had control of the company's finances, as he had during his previous reign. The Millionaire's Club, consisting of WCW's veteran stars such as Hogan, Flair and Diamond Dallas Page, were accused of preventing the younger talent from ascending to main event status and feuded with The New Blood, consisting of WCW's younger stars such as Billy Kidman, Booker T and Buff Bagwell. The New Blood/Millionaire's Club rivalry was aborted before the start of the New Blood Rising PPV, which was supposed to showcase the rivalry. WCW became even more desperate, going as far as giving the WCW World Heavyweight Championship to actor David Arquette, who was making promotional appearances for WCW's feature film Ready to Rumble.

The struggles of WCW since Russo's arrival at WCW came to a head on July 9, 2000, at the Bash at the Beach PPV. During the match between Jeff Jarrett and Hollywood Hogan for the WCW World Heavyweight Championship, Jeff Jarrett, by Russo's order, lay down in the ring to let Hogan pin him and win the title. After scolding Russo as being the reason for WCW's problems and pinning Jarrett, Hogan left the arena in disgust. Russo cut a shoot promo proclaiming that the reason WCW was in dire straits was "that goddamn politician Hulk Hogan". During the promo, Russo also reversed the result of the Jarrett–Hogan match and gave the championship back to Jarrett.

Additionally, he announced that Jarrett would defend the WCW World Heavyweight Championship against Booker T later that night. Booker T ended up winning the championship over Jarrett. Bash at the Beach 2000 not only exposed the backstage hardships under Russo, but it was also the last event for Hogan, as he would never appear in WCW again following the incident.

On the September 25, 2000, edition of WCW Monday Nitro, Russo won the WCW World Heavyweight Championship in a steel cage match. At the end of the match, Russo suffered a concussion after Goldberg speared him through a cage, resulting in a head-on collision with the ringside barriers. On the October 2, 2000, edition of Nitro, Russo relinquished the championship, stating that he was "not an athlete nor did I [Russo] ever claim to be." The October 2, 2000, edition of Nitro was also the last appearance for Russo in WCW, though he continued to be employed by WCW until its demise.

In 2000, Ted Turner was no longer running WCW, which had been purchased by Time Warner in 1996 and America Online (AOL) in 2001. In 2000, WCW lost US$62 million, due to guaranteed contracts of their older performers, plummeting advertising revenues, dropping house show attendance, declining attendance of tapings for Thunder (which moved its tapings to immediately after Nitro beginning on October 9 of that year), controversial booking decisions (like Arquette and Russo winning the WCW World Heavyweight Championship), and expensive stunts to boost the dismal ratings and pay-per-view buyrates. Difficulties also began to arise around Goldberg, who had become WCW's flagship performer. He sustained an arm injury during a backstage vignette taping that kept him off television for six months; upon his return, the decision was made to try to shake up the status quo by having him turn heel at The Great American Bash, despite being the most popular wrestler in WCW. Fans poorly received the change.

==== 2001: End of the War, WWF purchases WCW and ECW, the Invasion ====
In January 2001, Fusient Media Ventures, led by Bischoff, announced its intention to purchase WCW. The deal was contingent upon the Turner networks keeping Nitro on TNT on Monday and Thunder on TBS on Wednesday. When Jamie Kellner took over as CEO of Turner Broadcasting, he announced the cancellation of all WCW programming on Turner's networks, believing that wrestling did not fit the demographics of either channel and would not be favorable enough to get the "right" advertisers to buy airtime (even though Thunder was the highest-rated show on TBS at the time). In the book NITRO: The Incredible Rise and Inevitable Collapse of Ted Turner's WCW by Guy Evans, it is said that a key condition in WCW's purchase deal with Fusient Media Ventures was that Fusient wanted control over time slots on TNT and TBS networks, regardless of whether these slots would show WCW programming or not. This influenced Kellner's decision to cancel WCW programming. WCW's losses were then written off via purchase accounting; according to Evans: "In the post-merger environment, the new conglomerate was able to 'write down' money-losing operations, essentially eliminating those losses because of their irrelevancy moving forward."

With no national television outlet to air the shows, Fusient dropped its offer to purchase WCW. The WWF, the only company that would not need the television time slots Kellner had canceled, then made their offer. On March 23, 2001, all of WCW's trademarks and archived video library, as well as a select 25 contracts, were sold to Vince McMahon and WWFE, Inc. through its subsidiary WCW Inc. WCW's assets were purchased for just $3 million. Most of the main event-level stars including Flair, Goldberg, Kevin Nash, and Sting were contracted directly to parent company AOL Time Warner instead of WCW, and thus AOL Time Warner was forced to continue to pay many of the wrestlers for years. The actual WCW entity was reverted to Universal Wrestling Corporation solely to deal with both legal and administrative issues.

TNT did allow a final Nitro show to air from Panama City Beach, Florida, which had been scheduled for the following Monday on March 26. McMahon opened the last-ever episode of WCW Monday Nitro with a simulcast with WWF Raw Is War, which aired from Cleveland, Ohio, with a self-praising speech consistent with his on-screen persona. The final WCW World Heavyweight Championship match for the show and the company saw WCW United States Heavyweight Champion Booker T defeat Scott Steiner to win the WCW World Heavyweight Championship. The main event featured Sting defeating Ric Flair with the Scorpion Deathlock as a culmination of their trademark feud, then both men embraced one another at the match's conclusion. This was a direct parallel to the very first Nitro. After the Sting/Flair match, McMahon appeared in the ring on Raw Is War to close Nitro in another simulcast and declare victory over WCW. His son Shane McMahon then appeared on Nitro, declaring that it was actually he who had bought WCW. This initiated the Invasion storyline that would have Shane's character leading the WCW invasion of the WWF, which lasted from March to November 2001 and marked the end of WCW as a brand. The last Nitro drew a 3.0 rating. The final rating tally in 270 head-to-head showdowns was: 154 wins for Monday Night Raw, 112 for Nitro, and four ties.

Three weeks before the final Nitro, ECW owner Paul Heyman had begun an announcing contract with the WWF, as ECW had also fallen into financial difficulties and was forced to declare bankruptcy and close in January 2001. Thus, the WWF became the sole national professional wrestling promotion in the United States. During the Invasion storyline, Heyman's ECW (owned in the storyline by Stephanie McMahon) would align with Shane McMahon's WCW against the WWF, a faction known as the Alliance.

== Aftermath and legacy ==
=== WCW/ECW revivals and retrospectives ===
WWF business steadily declined in North America after the end of the war, with a noticeable drop in buyrates and ratings. To compensate for the decrease in domestic revenue, the WWF expanded their business outside of the United States. The Raw Is War logo and its name were retired in September 2001, following the September 11 attacks and sensitivity over the word war, and because the Monday Night War was "over." By 2002, the WWF roster had doubled in size due to the abundance of contracted workers. As a result of the increase, WWF was divided into franchises through its two main television programs, Raw and SmackDown!, assigning the now divided roster to either franchise while also designating championships and appointing figureheads to each franchise. This expansion became known as the Brand Extension. The franchises or "brands" act as complementing promotions under the parent company. The institution of concepts like separate rosters, "General Managers" and talent drafts was intended to emulate the rivalry that had ended with WCW.

In May 2002, WWF was renamed to World Wrestling Entertainment (WWE) after a lawsuit with the World Wide Fund for Nature, which operates in the United States and Canada under its former international name of "World Wildlife Fund", and also used the WWF initials. Ric Flair, Kevin Nash, and Goldberg eventually signed contracts with WWE only after the conclusion of the Invasion, though it is generally thought that their participation in the storyline would have benefited the promotion.

In the summer of 2003, WWE purchased ECW's assets in court, acquiring the rights to ECW's video library. They used this video library to put together a two-disc DVD titled The Rise and Fall of ECW. The set was released in November 2004. In 2004, an unauthorized DVD called Forever Hardcore was written, directed and produced by former WCW crew member Jeremy Borash in response to The Rise and Fall of ECW. The DVD had stories of wrestlers who were not employed by WWE telling their side of ECW's history. By 2005, WWE began reintroducing ECW through content from the ECW video library and a series of books. With heightened and rejuvenated interest in the ECW franchise, WWE organized ECW One Night Stand in June 2005, an ECW reunion event. With the financial and critical success of the production, WWE produced a second One Night Stand in June 2006 and relaunched the ECW franchise as a WWE brand, complementary to Raw and SmackDown. The brand would continue to operate until 2010 when it was replaced with NXT.

In 2004, WWE produced a DVD called The Monday Night War. Two hours in length, the DVD left out a large portion of the "war", breaking off around 1997 before jumping straight to the post-WCW era of WWE. The objectivity of the DVD's content was questioned, as some believed the documentary was simply telling the WWE side of the story. On August 25, 2009, WWE released The Rise and Fall of WCW on DVD. The DVD looks back at the roots of WCW during the days of Georgia Championship Wrestling and Mid-Atlantic Championship Wrestling, to the glory days of Monday Nitro and the nWo, and to its demise and sale to WWE. With the launch of the WWE Network in 2014, much of WCW's and ECW's video libraries have been made available to subscribers.

In 2014, Sting would make his first appearance in WWE, interrupting the Survivor Series main event. Sting was the last major WCW star to never wrestle for WWE. At WrestleMania 31, Sting would face Triple H in a no disqualification match. The match was interrupted by the stables of WCW's nWo and WWE's DX, leading to a brawl between them and Sting's defeat in his first match in the company. Despite Sting having cut a promo on Raw saying the match would not be about the war between the companies "because that would be ridiculous at this point", the match finish has been interpreted as a desire of McMahon to reiterate his victory in the Monday Night War, with Scott Hall commenting, "That's Vince just reminding you who won, even if he's going to make money the other way".

The Monday Night Wars has been the subject of the fifth episode in the first season of WWE Rivals which aired on August 7, 2022.

=== Post-Monday Night War competition ===
As a result of the Monday Night War, professional wrestling became a prime-time tradition on Monday nights in America. It also lessened the prevalence of squash matches (where star wrestlers would defeat jobbers) on television, as both companies were compelled to show competitive, pay-per-view quality matches on a weekly basis in an effort to increase ratings. The Monday Night War resulted in the creation of millions of new wrestling viewers, and are commonly referred to as professional wrestling's most recent boom period. Stars such as Stone Cold Steve Austin, The Rock, Bill Goldberg and Sting became household names, and some attempted to parlay their newfound fame into other mediums and found success in them, much like Hulk Hogan of the 1980s and early 1990s: notable examples being Mick Foley, who became a New York Times best selling author with the first volume of his autobiography, Have a Nice Day, and Dwayne "The Rock" Johnson, who branched out to become one of the highest grossing actors of all time.

WCW's closure left a gap in the market which several companies have attempted to fill. Total Nonstop Action Wrestling (TNA) and Ring of Honor (ROH) both emerged in early 2002 and have enjoyed moderate success since that time. At first running weekly pay-per-views, TNA switched to monthly pay-per-views supported by a weekly show on cable television, Impact Wrestling (now known as Impact!). On January 4, 2010, TNA moved Impact! to Monday nights, in direct competition with Raw. In a move referred to by some as "The New Monday Night Wars", TNA began airing Impact! on Monday each week beginning on March 8, 2010. After declining ratings, the show returned to its Thursday timeslot in May 2010. In late 2007, ROH also started airing bi-monthly pay-per-views, and in 2009, ROH began airing a weekly wrestling program on HDNet. However, it was announced in early 2011 that HDNet would drop ROH from its schedule. Since September 2011, ROH airs a weekly syndicated television show on stations owned by Sinclair Broadcasting Group, which was ROH's parent company until All Elite Wrestling owner Tony Khan announced that he had purchased the promotion on March 2, 2022. In June 2015, the weekly show began airing on Destination America as well, though it was dropped and moved to the Sinclair-owned Comet. In 2017, TNA was purchased by Anthem Sports & Entertainment, the owner of their Canadian broadcaster Fight Network and renamed Impact Wrestling after their television series.

In May 2019, All Elite Wrestling (AEW), which had launched the previous January, announced a deal to broadcast a live two-hour weekly television show on TNT. The show, known as AEW Dynamite, premiered on October 2, 2019. In August, WWE announced that it would move NXT to the USA Network beginning with the show's September 18 episode and change the show's format to a live two-hour program which will compete with AEW's live weekly program. NXT's move to the USA Network triggered the start of the Wednesday Night Wars.

== Comparison of ratings between Raw and Nitro ==
Date	Raw	Nitro
September 4, 1995	N/A	2.9
September 11, 1995	2.2	2.5
September 18, 1995	2.5	1.9
September 25, 1995	1.9	2.7
October 2, 1995	2.5	2.5
October 9, 1995	2.6	2.6
October 16, 1995	2.5	2.2
October 23, 1995	2.6	2.2
October 30, 1995	2.2	2.5
November 6, 1995	2.1	2.3
November 13, 1995	2.6	2
November 20, 1995	2.3	2.5
November 27, 1995	2.5	2.3
December 4, 1995	2.4	2.6
December 11, 1995	2.5	2.6
December 18, 1995	2.3	2.7
December 25, 1995	N/A	2.5
January 1, 1996	2.6	2.5
January 8, 1996	3	2.8
January 15, 1996	2.4	3.5
January 22, 1996	2.9	2.7
January 29, 1996	2.4	2.8
February 5, 1996	2.7	2.9
February 12, 1996	N/A	3.7
February 19, 1996	3.1	2.9
February 26, 1996	3.1	3.2
March 4, 1996	3.6	N/A
March 11, 1996	2.9	3.2
March 18, 1996	2.9	3.6
March 25, 1996	2.8	3.1
April 1, 1996	2.9	2.8
April 8, 1996	4.7	N/A
April 15, 1996	3.1	2.8
April 22, 1996	3.3	2.7
April 29, 1996	3.9	2.1
May 6, 1996	4.1	1.9
May 13, 1996	3.5	2.3
May 20, 1996	2.3	3.1
May 27, 1996	2.3	2.8
June 3, 1996	2.3	3
June 10, 1996	2.7	2.6
June 17, 1996	2.3	3.4
June 24, 1996	2.7	3.3
July 1, 1996	2.6	3.3
July 8, 1996	2.5	3.5
July 15, 1996	2.6	3.4
July 22, 1996	2.2	2.6
July 29, 1996	2.1	3.1
August 5, 1996	2.8	3
August 12, 1996	2	3.3
August 19, 1996	2.9	3.5
August 26, 1996	N/A	4.3
September 2, 1996	N/A	4.3
September 9, 1996	2.4	3.7
September 16, 1996	2.1	3.7
September 23, 1996	2	3.4
September 30, 1996	2.3	3.3
October 7, 1996	2.1	3.5
October 14, 1996	1.8	3.3
October 21, 1996	2.6	3.2
October 28, 1996	2	3.6
November 4, 1996	2.3	3.4
November 11, 1996	2.5	3.7
November 18, 1996	2.4	3.2
November 25, 1996	2.1	3.1
December 2, 1996	2.3	3.4
December 9, 1996	2.3	3.3
December 16, 1996	2.3	3.2
December 23, 1996	1.5	3.1
December 30, 1996	1.6	3.6
January 6, 1997	2.1	3
January 13, 1997	2.3	3.4
January 20, 1997	2.2	3.7
January 27, 1997	2.2	3.6
February 3, 1997	2.6	3.1
February 10, 1997	2.3	3.8
February 17, 1997	2.1	2.9
February 24, 1997	2.5	3
March 3, 1997	1.9	3.4
March 10, 1997	2.3	3.5
March 17, 1997	2.4	3.6
March 24, 1997	2.5	3
March 31, 1997	2.7	3.4
April 7, 1997	2.2	3.7
April 14, 1997	2.2	3.5
April 21, 1997	2.8	3.4
April 28, 1997	2.7	3.4
May 5, 1997	2.8	3.2
May 12, 1997	2.8	3.2
May 19, 1997	3.1	3.6
May 26, 1997	2.7	3.3
June 2, 1997	2.5	3.3
June 9, 1997	2.2	3.4
June 16, 1997	2.4	3.3
June 23, 1997	2.4	3.3
June 30, 1997	2.5	3.3
July 7, 1997	2.5	3.4
July 14, 1997	2.6	3.5
July 21, 1997	4.1	N/A
July 28, 1997	2.9	3.4
August 4, 1997	2.7	4.4
August 11, 1997	2.9	3.8
August 18, 1997	3.2	4
August 25, 1997	N/A	5
September 1, 1997	N/A	4.8
September 8, 1997	2.2	4.3
September 15, 1997	2.6	3.9
September 22, 1997	2.4	3.7
September 29, 1997	2.7	4
October 6, 1997	3	3.9
October 13, 1997	2.3	3.8
October 20, 1997	2.9	4.6
October 27, 1997	2.3	4.3
November 3, 1997	2.6	4
November 10, 1997	3.4	4.3
November 17, 1997	3.1	4.1
November 24, 1997	3	3.9
December 1, 1997	3	3.8
December 8, 1997	3	4.3
December 15, 1997	2.7	4.1
December 22, 1997	3.1	3.5
December 29, 1997	3.6	4.6
January 5, 1998	3.3	4.3
January 12, 1998	3.4	4.6
January 19, 1998	4	4.5
January 26, 1998	3.5	4.7
February 2, 1998	3.5	4.9
February 9, 1998	3.2	4.6
February 16, 1998	N/A	5.1
February 23, 1998	3.2	4.6
March 2, 1998	3.8	4.8
March 9, 1998	3.6	4.9
March 16, 1998	N/A	5.1
March 23, 1998	3.6	4.6
March 30, 1998	3.8	4.2
April 6, 1998	4.4	4.6
April 13, 1998	4.6	4.3
April 20, 1998	4.4	5.1
April 27, 1998	5.7	1.72
May 4, 1998	5.5	3.5
May 11, 1998	4.3	4.3
May 18, 1998	5.3	2.51
May 25, 1998	4.2	4.2
June 1, 1998	4.4	3.7
June 8, 1998	4.3	4.1
June 15, 1998	4.3	4
June 22, 1998	4.3	4.1
June 29, 1998	5.4	4.1
July 6, 1998	4	4.9
July 13, 1998	4.7	4.5
July 20, 1998	5	4.3
July 27, 1998	4.8	4.7
August 3, 1998	4.8	4.2
August 10, 1998	4.6	4.7
August 17, 1998	4.2	4.9
August 24, 1998	4.7	5.2
August 31, 1998	N/A	6
September 7, 1998	N/A	5.5
September 14, 1998	4	4.5
September 21, 1998	4	3.9
September 28, 1998	4.0	4.6
October 5, 1998	4.55	4.5
October 12, 1998	4.8	4.7
October 19, 1998	5	4.4
October 26, 1998	4.5	5.1
November 2, 1998	4.8	4.1
November 9, 1998	5	4.1
November 16, 1998	5.5	4.3
November 23, 1998	4.9	4.5
November 30, 1998	5	4.3
December 7, 1998	5.1	4.2
December 14, 1998	5.2	4.2
December 21, 1998	4.7	4
December 28, 1998	4.9	4.6
January 4, 1999	5.8	5
January 11, 1999	5.5	5
January 18, 1999	5.6	4.9
January 25, 1999	5.5	5
February 1, 1999	5.9	4.7
February 8, 1999	N/A	5.7
February 15, 1999	5.9	3.9
February 22, 1999	5.5	4.8
March 1, 1999	6.3	4.3
March 8, 1999	6.4	4.4
March 15, 1999	5.8	4.3
March 22, 1999	6.4	4
March 29, 1999	6.5	3.5
April 5, 1999	5.8	4.3
April 12, 1999	6.3	4.4
April 19, 1999	6.1	4.1
April 26, 1999	6	3.9
May 3, 1999	6.4	3.4
May 10, 1999	8.1	N/A
May 17, 1999	6.4	3.8
May 24, 1999	7.2	3.1
May 31, 1999	6.3	3.3
June 7, 1999	6.7	3.2
June 14, 1999	6.7	3.3
June 21, 1999	6	3.1
June 28, 1999	6.8	3.6
July 5, 1999	6.2	3.3
July 12, 1999	5.97	3.45
July 19, 1999	6.3	3.3
July 26, 1999	7.1	3.4
August 2, 1999	5.9	3.1
August 9, 1999	6.4	3.1
August 16, 1999	6.6	3.3
August 23, 1999	5.9	2.9
August 30, 1999	4.2	4
September 6, 1999	4.4	4.1
September 13, 1999	6	3.3
September 20, 1999	6.1	3.1
September 27, 1999	6.8	3
October 4, 1999	5.9	2.9
October 11, 1999	6.1	2.6
October 18, 1999	5.4	3.3
October 25, 1999	5.6	3.5
November 1, 1999	5.9	3.2
November 8, 1999	5.4	3.4
November 15, 1999	6.3	3.1
November 22, 1999	5.5	3.4
November 29, 1999	6.5	3.1
December 6, 1999	6	3
December 13, 1999	6.1	2.8
December 20, 1999	5.8	3.2
December 27, 1999	5.8	2.9
January 3, 2000	6.4	3.3
January 10, 2000	6.8	3.5
January 17, 2000	6	3
January 24, 2000	6.7	3.1
January 31, 2000	6.6	2.8
February 7, 2000	6.5	2.7
February 14, 2000	4.4	3.6
February 21, 2000	5.9	2.8
February 28, 2000	6.5	2.1
March 6, 2000	6.4	2.8
March 13, 2000	6.3	2.6
March 20, 2000	6.2	2.5
March 27, 2000	6.6	2.6
April 3, 2000	6.4	1.8
April 10, 2000	6.2	3.1
April 17, 2000	6.7	2.5
April 24, 2000	7.1	3.1
May 1, 2000	7.4	2.5
May 8, 2000	6.2	2.8
May 15, 2000	6.1	3.1
May 22, 2000	7.1	3.03
May 29, 2000	6.4	3
June 5, 2000	5.9	2.8
June 12, 2000	6.8	3
June 19, 2000	5.8	2.7
June 26, 2000	6.4	2.8
July 3, 2000	5.3	2.3
July 10, 2000	6	2.6
July 17, 2000	6.2	N/A
July 24, 2000	6.2	2.8
July 31, 2000	6.4	2.7
August 7, 2000	6.3	2.5
August 14, 2000	5.9	2.4
August 21, 2000	6.3	2.6
August 28, 2000	4.9	3.5
September 4, 2000	4.2	3.6
September 11, 2000	5.8	3.2
September 18, 2000	5.7	2.75
September 25, 2000	5.4	2.9
October 2, 2000	5.4	2.6
October 9, 2000	5.4	2.5
October 16, 2000	4.8	2.3
October 23, 2000	5.5	2.2
October 30, 2000	4.9	2.5
November 6, 2000	5.1	2.5
November 13, 2000	5	2.6
November 20, 2000	5	2.3
November 27, 2000	5	2.4
December 4, 2000	5	2.45
December 11, 2000	5.75	N/A
December 18, 2000	4.8	2.3
December 25, 2000	3.8	N/A
January 1, 2001	4.55	N/A
January 8, 2001	4.8	2.1
January 15, 2001	5.2	2.6
January 22, 2001	5.6	2.1
January 29, 2001	5.4	2.6
February 5, 2001	5	2.3
February 12, 2001	4.8	2.1
February 19, 2001	4.8	2.2
February 26, 2001	5.1	2.3
March 5, 2001	4.5	2.1
March 12, 2001	4.9	2.1
March 19, 2001	4.6	2.1
March 26, 2001	4.7	3
Raw win	Nitro win	Tie
Ratings unavailable or program not aired
Overall score Raw: 155; Nitro: 112; Tie: 4 Ratings unavailable or program not aired: 20

== See also ==
- History of professional wrestling
- History of World Championship Wrestling
- History of WWE
- TNA Impact!'s move to Monday nights
- Wednesday Night Wars
