= David Arquette in World Championship Wrestling =

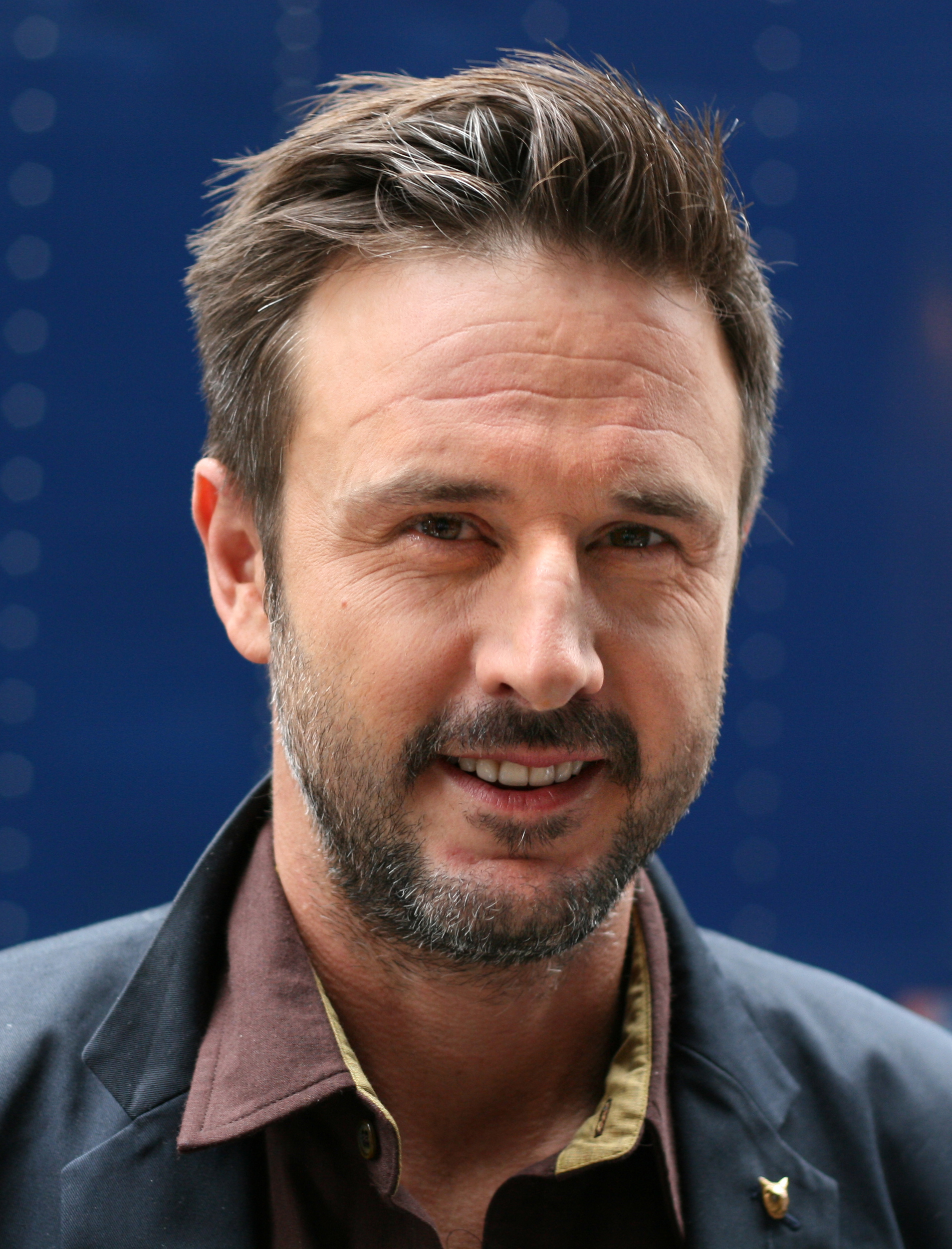
David Arquette became involved with World Championship Wrestling to promote the film Ready to Rumble.

Actor David Arquette worked with World Championship Wrestling (WCW), an American professional wrestling promotion, for a series of appearances in 2000. His involvement was conceived as a promotional crossover to advertise the film Ready to Rumble, as both WCW and Warner Bros., who were distributing the film, were subsidiaries of the same parent company, Time Warner. WCW writer Vince Russo believed that the actor, then enjoying the success of Scream 3 and considered a mainstream star, would bring attention to WCW's programming during its ongoing television ratings war with Vince McMahon's World Wrestling Federation (WWF; now WWE).

Arquette, a lifelong wrestling fan, was reticent about the extent of the storyline with which he would be involved, which saw him scripted to win the WCW World Heavyweight Championship, the company's most prestigious championship, and defend it in a pay-per-view main event. Reaction to the storyline was negative, with critics subsequently deriding it as one of professional wrestling's worst moments. Additionally, neither Ready to Rumble nor WCW's viewing figures benefited from the crossover; WCW would eventually fold less than a year after the storyline concluded. In later years, Arquette returned to professional wrestling in search of redemption, a journey chronicled in the documentary You Cannot Kill David Arquette (2020).

== Background ==
David Arquette's relationship with World Championship Wrestling (WCW) began with the film Ready to Rumble (2000), a sports comedy film in which Arquette acted alongside several WCW performers, including top stars Randy Savage and Bill Goldberg. In order to promote the film, Arquette was brought into the company as an on-screen performer, with the aim of portraying him as the WCW World Heavyweight Champion. Ready to Rumble was distributed by the Warner Bros. studio, a subsidiary of Time Warner, the same parent company as WCW.

Ready to Rumble required Arquette to learn the basics of professional wrestling, and he was taught by WCW performers Chris Kanyon, who worked as a stunt coordinator on the film, and Diamond Dallas Page; his stunt double, Shane Helms, was another WCW wrestler. Arquette, a lifelong wrestling fan, was hesitant towards the idea and did not wish to be given the championship. He later said that the film would not have been promoted on WCW programming if he did not agree to it. As well as promoting the film, the move was also seen as a means to boost the ratings for the promotion's main television program, WCW Monday Nitro, which at that time was competing for viewership with the World Wrestling Federation's Raw is War in a prolonged television ratings war. Arquette was at the height of his success following the release of the film Scream 3 (2000), and WCW script-writer Vince Russo believed the crossover had the potential to bring in new viewers.

== Storyline ==
"He did exactly what a Hollywood actor is supposed to do [...] David was a little timid, a little apprehensive, but never missed a cue".

— Jeff Jarrett on Arquette's aptitude

Arquette made his first appearance for WCW on the April 12, 2000, episode of WCW Thunder, where he was seen sitting in the front row of the audience. His involvement with Ready to Rumble was mentioned on-air and he was described as being close friends with Page. During the broadcast, Arquette climbed over the guardrail at ringside and participated in a brawl between Page and rival wrestler Jeff Jarrett, taking several bumps during the segment.

Arquette's championship win came on the April 26 broadcast of Thunder. He and then-champion Page competed in a tag-team match against Jarrett and Eric Bischoff, with the stipulation that the competitor scoring the winning pinfall would win the championship. Bischoff, like Arquette, was not a trained wrestler, but rather a WCW executive who had previously been the company's president. By pinning Bischoff, Arquette emerged as champion. After the broadcast, Arquette was encouraged by another former champion, Ric Flair, to wear the championship belt to the bar the other wrestlers visited after the show, and buy drinks for his colleagues for the night. Arquette credits Flair with calming tensions backstage amidst fellow wrestlers unhappy with the championship win, vouching for Arquette as "one of us".

Backstage vignettes were filmed on the set of 3000 Miles to Graceland (2001) with Arquette wearing the championship belt. Arquette's wife, actress Courteney Cox, was seen pleading with him not to compete at the risk of hurting himself; co-star Kurt Russell was also featured. On-air commentators referred to Arquette as a "paper tiger who hides behind his wife" during a championship defense against former mixed martial artist Tank Abbott. As Arquette was not expected to remain with WCW for long—his time as champion ultimately spanned four matches broadcast over two weeks—the story culminated at the May 7 pay-per-view show Slamboree, in a three-man match involving Arquette, Page and Jarrett, which saw Arquette lose the championship to Jarrett. This match took place in a three-tiered metal cage originally seen in Ready to Rumble.

== Legacy ==
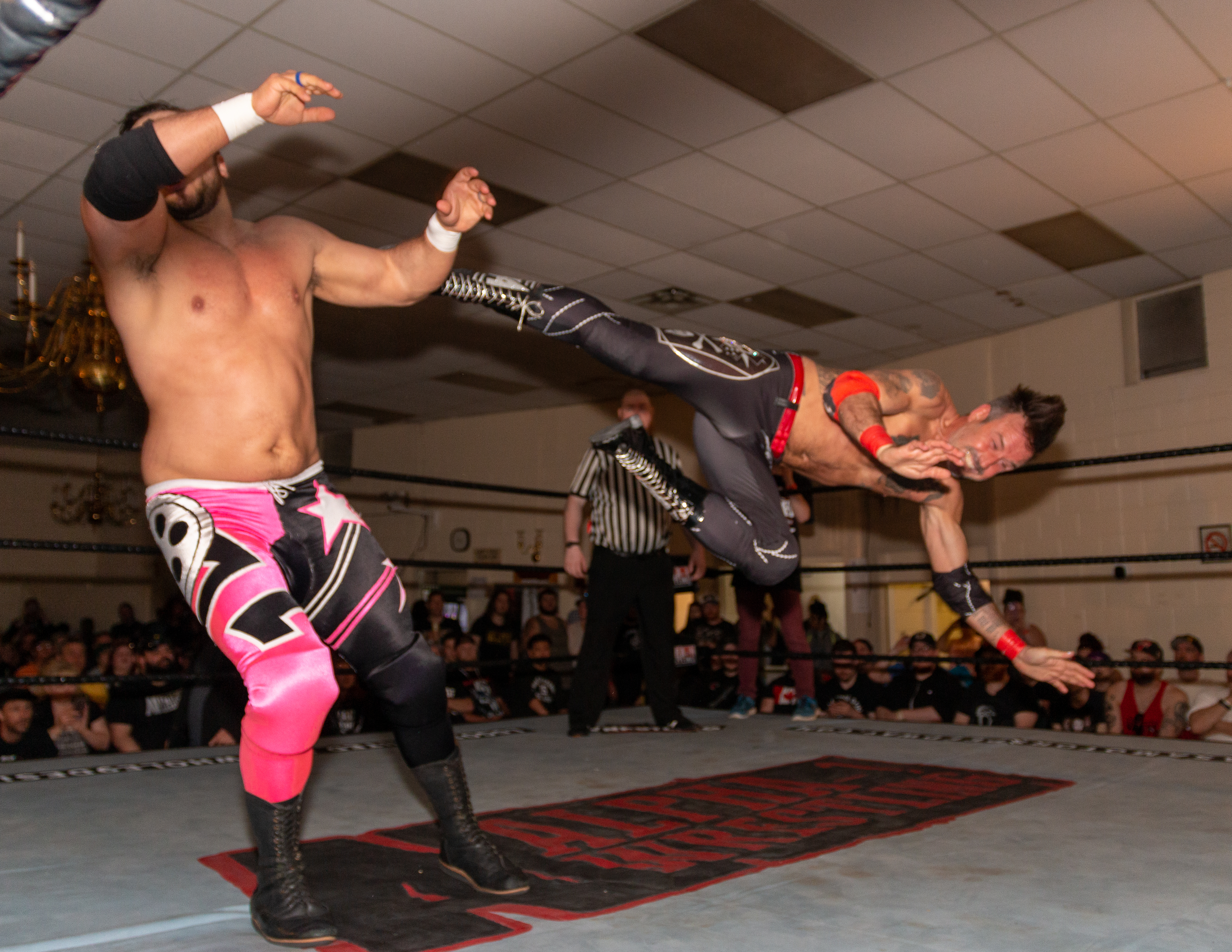
Arquette (pictured, right, with Ethan Page, left, in 2019) later returned to the ring.

The storyline was poorly received, damaging Arquette's reputation both as an actor and with wrestling fans; it has since been described as "one of the worst moments in pro wrestling", and "a publicity stunt gone wrong [...] forever associated with the death of WCW". WCW went out of business ten months after the Slamboree event, and the Arquette storyline is often seen as a contributing factor in its decline, although the fortunes of the company had already been waning before his involvement. WCW commentator Bobby Heenan compared the storyline to the comedy variety show Hee Haw, saying "they might as well have had Buck Owens picking at his guitar while wrestlers jumped out of the corn". Former WCW World Heavyweight Champion Bret Hart was dismayed at the timing and location of the Slamboree event; Hart's brother Owen died in the same Kansas City arena the previous year, and the date of May 7 was Owen's birthday, a confluence Hart found distasteful. Jarrett, however, defended the storyline, comparing it to his father Jerry Jarrett's successful partnership with actor Andy Kaufman in the Continental Wrestling Association during the 1980s.

Ready to Rumble did not benefit noticeably from the crossover, making back only half of what it had cost to produce. Critical reception for the film was poor. On Metacritic it holds a weighted average score of 23 out of 100, based on the reviews of 26 critics. Rotten Tomatoes lists it with an average score of 23% based on 70 reviews; their summary describes it as "humor at its lowest that isn't funny for kids and is insulting to adults". Additionally, Flair believed that even though the storyline achieved mainstream media attention, receiving coverage in USA Today, it was unsuccessful in convincing new viewers to follow WCW programming. Helms said "you can't be so interested in bringing in new customers that you alienate the ones you do have". The episode of Thunder that aired Arquette's championship win saw above-average viewing figures for the program, but quarter-hour Nielsen ratings showed that Arquette's match was the least-watched segment of the episode.

Wrestling journalist Dave Meltzer reported that live ticket sales for the Slamboree event all but stopped after Arquette's involvement in its buildup. The show was described by Meltzer as "a substantial money loser as a live event". According to Meltzer, the event drew 4,862 paid attendees and 7,165 total, grossing $139,202 at the box office. The event's pay-per-view buy rate was not published by WCW but was estimated by the Wrestling Observer Newsletter to be a 0.2 rate, which would have been the third-lowest in WCW's history at that time. (Note: A pay-per-view buy rate represents the percentage of homes which purchased an event out of those to which it was available. The number represents hundredths of a percent, so a 0.2 buy rate equates to an event being purchased by 0.002% of the homes to which it was available. Buy rates typically only represent sales made in the United States and Canada.)

Arquette donated his earnings from WCW to the families of several wrestlers who had recently died or been injured at that time, including the widows of Owen Hart, Brian Pillman, referee Randy Anderson and the families of the deceased Bobby Duncum Jr. and quadriplegic Darren Drozdov. In later years Arquette still harbored regret over the angle, and returned to professional wrestling to try winning over fans disappointed with the 2000 storyline. This led to a series of independent wrestling matches, including a bloody "deathmatch" with Nick Gage which saw Arquette badly cut by a broken light tube. Arquette's return to the industry was captured in the documentary film You Cannot Kill David Arquette (2020).

== Footnotes ==
=== References ===
- Evans, Guy (2018). Nitro: The Incredible Rise and Inevitable Collapse of Ted Turner's WCW. Nitro Book. ISBN 978-0692139172.
- Flair, Ric (2005). To Be the Man. World Wrestling Entertainment. ISBN 978-0743491815.
- Hart, Bret (2009). Hitman: My Real Life in the Cartoon World of Wrestling. Ebury Publishing. ISBN 978-1407029313.
- Jarrett, Jeff; Thompson, Conrad (September 14, 2021). "Episode 20: David Arquette". My World with Jeff Jarrett (Podcast).
- Reynolds, R. D. (2004). The Death of WCW. ECW Press. ISBN 978-1554902552.
- Wall, Jeremy (2005). UFC's Ultimate Warriors. ECW Press. ISBN 978-1550226911.
