= Billionaire Ted =

Professional wrestling sketch

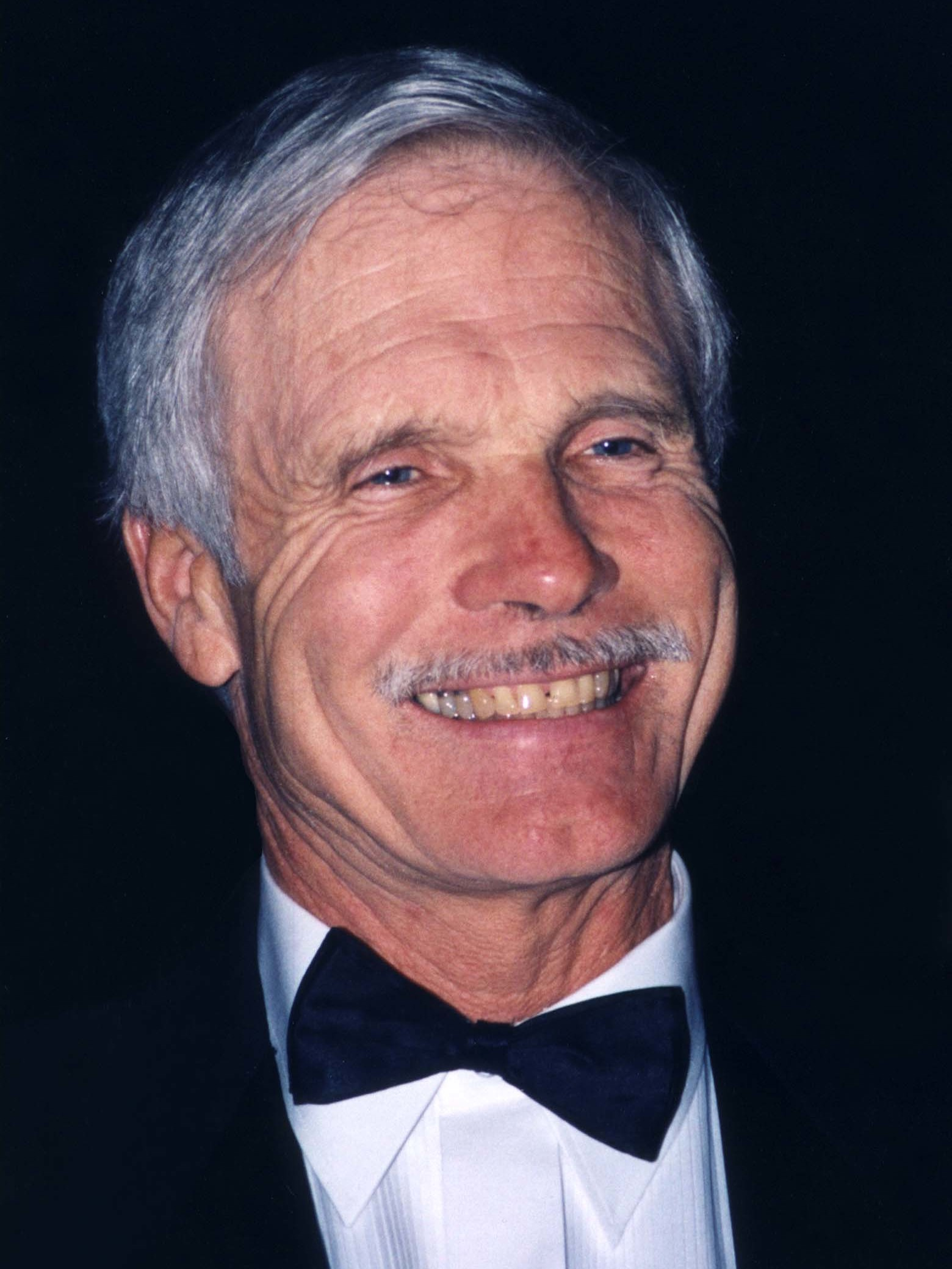
Billionaire Ted was a parody of Ted Turner

Billionaire Ted is a series of comedic sketches that ran on World Wrestling Federation (WWF) programming in 1996. They were created to parody media mogul Ted Turner, who owned rival World Championship Wrestling (WCW), and several WCW wrestlers, including Hulk Hogan (parodied as "The Huckster") and "Macho Man" Randy Savage (parodied as "Nacho Man"). The skits consisted of mocking Turner and WCW by referencing the age of their wrestlers as well as bringing up concerns about steroids. The skits were viewed as gradually becoming more malicious rather than parody, as they were broadcast in addition to the WWF chairman Vince McMahon complementing them with anti-Turner press advertisements outside of WWF programming. The skits were ended by USA Network president Kay Koplovitz, who felt they had moved away from parody and towards mirroring McMahon's personal opinions of Turner and WCW.

== Background ==
During the 1980s, the WWF had been the top professional wrestling organization in the United States, although it had a solid challenger in Jim Crockett Promotions (JCP), which Turner purchased in 1988 and renamed World Championship Wrestling (WCW). By the mid-1990s, WCW began recruiting high-profile former WWF superstars from the 1980s, such as Hulk Hogan and Randy Savage. In 1995 it directly targeted the WWF by creating its own flagship television show, WCW Monday Nitro. They scheduled it on TNT in the same time slot as the WWF's flagship show WWF Monday Night Raw, which aired on the USA Network, leading to the Monday Night War. In response to these and other tactics, WWF chairman Vince McMahon decided to create a series of sketches lampooning Turner and WCW. Despite going against his long-time policy of not acknowledging his competition, McMahon decreed to his aides: "It's going to be the funniest thing we've ever done".

The skits parodied Turner, who was referred to as "Billionaire Ted" and portrayed as a bumbling, out-of-touch hillbilly initially trying to improve his WCW product compared with the perceived superiority of WWF programming. Also parodied alongside him in the skits were former 1980s WWF talents who had defected to WCW, namely Hulk Hogan (who became "The Huckster"), "Macho Man" Randy Savage (who became known as the "Nacho Man"), and WCW interviewer "Mean" Gene Okerlund (who was parodied as "Scheme Gene"). Hogan and Savage were portrayed as elderly and incapable wrestlers, while Okerlund was depicted as a con man who wanted to scam money from fans via premium phone lines.

== Original sketches ==
The first few sketches (originally promoted as "Billionaire Ted's Rasslin' Warroom") feature Billionaire Ted in his boardroom trying to copy WWF programming but his older wrestlers stating they are unable to do the more athletic moves or use original promotional tactics. McMahon made the point that the WWF promoted it as satire to protect them from any possible defamation lawsuits. Some of the skits also include allusions to WCW's in-house drug testing compared with the WWF's independent drug testing program. The WCW vice-president Eric Bischoff, who had previously called the WWF to express his support for the skits, wrote a letter (which McMahon then broadcast) defending WCW and stating they were looking into a lawsuit about the skits. In response, WCW, which had usually made comments about the WWF on their programming, limited their remarks on television as a result of the steroids skit and temporarily dropped their "Where the Big Boys Play" tagline to avoid implications that it equated to steroids.

A later sketch featured Billionaire Ted wanting to buy some WWF New Generation wrestlers to which a WWF voiceover says, "It's not for sale!", in reference to Turner buying older assets and repackaging them.

== Cancellation ==
Though the Billionaire Ted skits were initially popular, McMahon started moving WWF employees from other writing tasks to work on them. McMahon also ordered the WWF's lawyers to send a dossier to the Federal Trade Commission (FTC) stating the proposed merger between Turner Broadcasting System and Time Warner was an attempt to drive the WWF out of business, which he also supplemented by taking out adverts in newspapers and financial magazines alleging Turner was using stockholder money to fund a "personal vendetta" against the WWF. Though most newspapers refused to print them on the grounds that the papers felt they were defamatory, The New York Times published an edited version which was broadcast on television. The skits eventually started moving away from WCW references and focused on targeting Turner. One of the skits had Billionaire Ted on a mock television trivia game show identifying quotes involving racial and sexual language from Turner. Another had Billionaire Ted on a parody of Larry King Live refusing to answer why The Huckster's salary was drawn from other more profitable Turner businesses opposed to from the loss-making WCW. This was something WCW had been doing with Hogan in reality by drawing his salary from Turner Home Entertainment instead of WCW on the grounds of Hogan's movie work.

The final skit on the USA Network features Billionaire Ted appearing in front of an FTC committee akin to A Few Good Men using the "you can't handle the truth" line. The USA Network president, Kay Koplovitz, felt that McMahon was under stress and that the videos were becoming malicious rather than humorous. As a result, she ordered that no more Billionaire Ted skits would appear on the USA Network. The final Billionaire Ted skit involves a wrestling match between The Huckster and The Nacho Man, with Billionaire Ted refereeing, on the WrestleMania XII free pre-show where all the characters die from heart attacks.

== Legacy ==
As a result of the skits being broadcast, Koplovitz insisted on all future WWF scripts being sent in advance to the network and that the network have a representative on the WWF's creative team. Due to her concerns over McMahon, she sent one of her executives to work with him on WWF programming, which they had hitherto paid little attention to until WWF Raw started pulling in low ratings and due to network opposition to some characters in the past, such as the heel Doink the Clown.

Despite the parody, Turner reportedly found the sketches amusing. When Scott Hall moved from the WWF to WCW, his debut promo on WCW Monday Nitro involved him asking to see Billionaire Ted, The Nacho Man, and Scheme Gene. When Hall, Hogan, and Kevin Nash formed the New World Order (nWo) in WCW, in his first promo since turning heel, Hogan referred to Turner as Billionaire Ted. Hall and Hogan also referred to Savage as the "Nacho Man" in late 1996. Later, former WWF wrestler Ted DiBiase was brought in as the nWo's manager and was called "Trillionaire Ted" as a play on the Billionaire Ted name.

Professional wrestling reviewers stated that they felt that, though the skits were good parody and did bring up legitimate concerns (such as about steroids), the Billionaire Ted skits were viewed as petty and not addressing the reason why WCW had been challenging the WWF. It was also viewed by Hogan as having backfired on McMahon because it led to viewers turning from the WWF to WCW to see if the parodies were actually true.
