= WrestleMania XII =

1996 World Wrestling Federation pay-per-view event

- Promotional poster featuring Razor Ramon, Shawn Michaels, Bret Hart, Diesel, and The Undertaker with the logo spoofing the 20th Century Fox logo and its searchlights
- Promotion: World Wrestling Federation
- Date: March 31, 1996
- City: Anaheim, California, United States
- Venue: Arrowhead Pond of Anaheim
- Attendance: 18,853
- Buy rate: North America: 290,000

Pay-per-view chronology
← Previous; In Your House 6	Next → In Your House 7: Good Friends, Better Enemies

WrestleMania chronology
← Previous; XI	Next → 13

WrestleMania XII was a 1996 professional wrestling pay-per-view (PPV) event produced by the World Wrestling Federation (WWF, renamed WWE in 2002). It was the 12th annual WrestleMania and took place on March 31, 1996, at the Arrowhead Pond of Anaheim in Anaheim, California. Eight matches were held at the event, including two on the Free for All pre-show.

In the main event, Bret Hart lost the WWF Championship to Shawn Michaels in the first televised Iron Man match in company history, lasting over 60 minutes. In his return to the company after a four-year hiatus, Ultimate Warrior defeated Hunter Hearst Helmsley. Roddy Piper had his first match since 1994, taking on and defeating Goldust in a "Hollywood Backlot Brawl" match.

== Production ==
=== Background ===
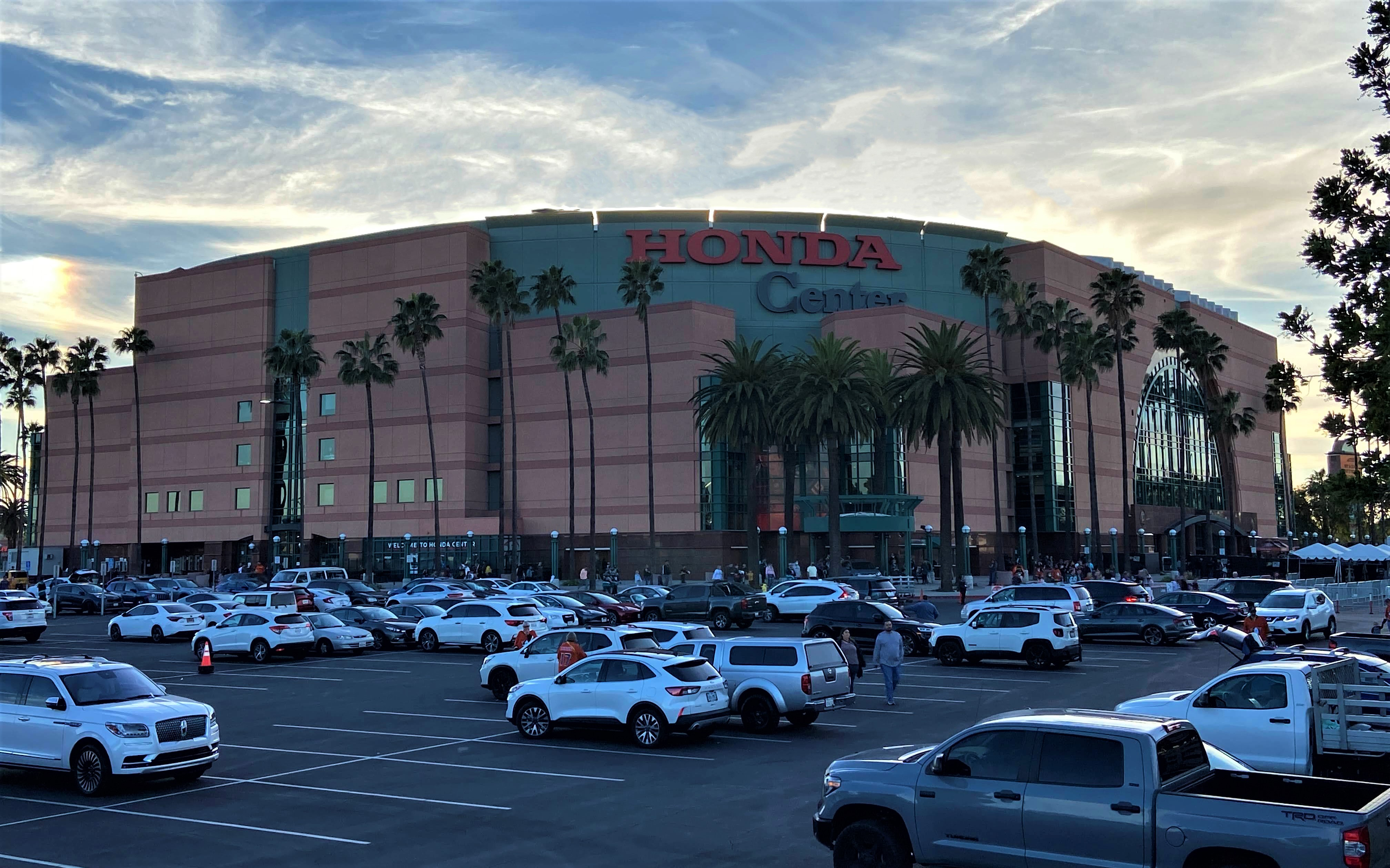
The 12th annual WrestleMania was held in Anaheim, California at the Arrowhead Pond of Anaheim (pictured as Honda Center, renamed in 2006).

WrestleMania is considered the World Wrestling Federation's (WWF, renamed WWE in 2002) flagship professional wrestling pay-per-view (PPV) event, having first been held in 1985. It has become the longest-running professional wrestling event in history and is held annually between mid-March to mid-April. It was the first of the WWF's original four PPVs, which includes Royal Rumble, SummerSlam, and Survivor Series, referred to as the "Big Four", and was considered one of the "Big Five" PPVs with the addition of King of the Ring in 1993. WrestleMania XII was scheduled to be held on March 31, 1996, at the Arrowhead Pond of Anaheim in Anaheim, California.

=== Storylines ===
The main attraction of this WrestleMania was the WWF Championship contested in an Iron Man match; whereby the winner would be the man to win most falls over sixty minutes. Shawn Michaels had earned the opportunity to face reigning champion Bret Hart by winning the 1996 Royal Rumble, and had also defeated Owen Hart at In Your House 6 for the right to keep his WrestleMania title shot.

The main event was built on Hart wanting to retain the WWF Championship against Michaels, who had suffered a number of setbacks over the course of the previous year, including failing to win Diesel's WWF Championship the previous year at WrestleMania XI in April 1995, being accosted at a Syracuse, New York nightclub in October 1995 (and subsequently forfeiting the WWF Intercontinental Championship to Dean Douglas at In Your House 4), and suffering a storyline concussion at the hands of Owen Hart in November 1995.

Hunter Hearst Helmsley made his debut in the WWF in May 1995, with his wrestling gimmick being in that he was a rich snob born with a silver spoon in his mouth. He went on an undefeated winning streak throughout the year until the Royal Rumble. Ultimate Warrior, meanwhile, had left the WWF in 1992 after failing a drug test. His last match was on the November 14, 1992, edition of Saturday Night's Main Event XXXI, where he and "Macho Man" Randy Savage defeated Ted DiBiase and Irwin R. Schyster in a tag team match. WWF officials later signed a match between Ultimate Warrior, who re-signed to the WWF in an attempt to increase ratings, and Helmsley for WrestleMania XII.

Diesel began feuding with The Undertaker after interfering in a bout between The Undertaker and Bret Hart at the 1996 Royal Rumble. Undertaker responded by interfering in Diesel's WWF Championship steel cage match against champion Bret Hart at In Your House 6, which saw Undertaker pull Diesel under the ring, costing Diesel the match. In an episode of Monday Night Raw that aired on March 18, 1996, Diesel was battling Barry Horowitz when he caught a glimpse of Paul Bearer pushing a casket up the entrance ramp. Believing it to be The Undertaker's casket, Diesel armed himself with a wrench before opening the casket's lid and seeing his own "corpse" lying in repose inside (which was actually an illusion made possible by having live footage cut to a pre-recorded close-up footage of Diesel himself in the same casket, lying in a relaxed position with his eyes closed, filmed at some time before the episode, thus avoiding showing the mannequin in the casket up-close); seeing "himself" in the casket terrified him, as it foreshadowed The Undertaker's upcoming match against Diesel in WrestleMania XII.

A match that was originally planned for WrestleMania XII was a Miami Street Fight between Razor Ramon and Goldust, which would later be changed to a "Hollywood Backlot Brawl" between Goldust and interim WWF President Roddy Piper. After debuting in late 1995 and defeating both Marty Jannetty at In Your House 4 and Bam Bam Bigelow at Survivor Series, Goldust would begin an angle with then-Intercontinental Champion Razor Ramon, in which the former had expressed his personal love and admiration for the latter, which had disgusted Razor. The two would wrestle at the 1996 Royal Rumble, leading to Goldust defeating Razor and winning the Intercontinental Championship after outside interference from both Goldust's debuting manager Marlena and The 1-2-3 Kid. Both Goldust and Razor were scheduled to face each other in a Miami Street Fight at WrestleMania, but Scott Hall (portraying the Razor Ramon character) had no intention of re-signing with the WWF and was planning on leaving for WCW. Because of this, the angle was soon changed with Roddy Piper taking Razor Ramon's place and the Miami Street Fight becoming the Hollywood Backlot Brawl. Before this, Piper was pencilled in to have a celebrity match against O. J. Simpson, who had been acquitted of the murders of Nicole Brown Simpson and Ron Goldman 5 months before WrestleMania. Despite getting into contact with O. J.'s representatives, the WWF abandoned their plans due to fears of potential public backlash and loss of sponsorship.

== Event ==
Other on-screen personnel
Role:	Name:
English commentators	Vince McMahon
English commentators	Jerry Lawler
Spanish commentators	Carlos Cabrera
Spanish commentators	Hugo Savinovich
Interviewers	Mr. Perfect
Interviewers	Todd Pettengill
Interviewers	Dok Hendrix
Ring announcer	Howard Finkel
Referees	Mike Chioda
Referees	Jack Doan
Referees	Earl Hebner
Referees	Tim White

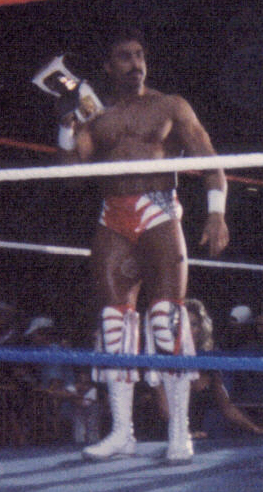
Marc Mero debuted in the World Wrestling Federation at WrestleMania XII.

The opening bout, which aired on the free-for-all broadcast, was a tag team match for the vacant WWF Tag Team Championship between the Bodydonnas (Skip and Zip) and the Godwinns (Henry O. Godwinn and Phineas I. Godwinn). This match was the final bout of a tournament held to determine the new champions after the titles were vacated in February 1996. The match ended when Skip pinned Phineas I. Godwinn using a roll-up, making the Bodydonnas the new WWF Tag Team Champions.

The second bout, which also aired on the free-for-all broadcast, was a singles match (billed as a "geriatric match") between "The Huckster" and "Nacho Man", two characters created to parody Hulk Hogan and "Macho Man" Randy Savage (former WWF performers who had joined its competitor World Championship Wrestling). The referee for the match was "Billionaire Ted", a parody of Ted Turner, the owner of World Championship Wrestling's parent company Turner Broadcasting System. This bout marked the culmination of a series of skits the WWF had aired featuring the three characters. This match did not take place in the Arrowhead Pond, having been pre-recorded elsewhere. The match ended in a no contest when both competitors, along with Billionaire Ted, seemingly died in the ring.

The third bout, and the first bout to air on the pay-per-view broadcast proper, was a six-man tag team match pitting The British Bulldog, Owen Hart, and Vader (Camp Cornette) against Ahmed Johnson, Jake Roberts, and Yokozuna, with the stipulation that if Yokozuna's team won he would receive five minutes in the ring with Jim Cornette, the manager of Camp Cornette. The match ended when Roberts attempted to give Cornette a DDT, only for Vader to knock Roberts down and pin him following a Vader Bomb.

The fourth bout was a "Hollywood Backlot Brawl" between Goldust and Roddy Piper. The match began in a parking lot, with the men brawling and using weapons. After Goldust fled in a golden Cadillac, Piper pursued him in a white Ford Bronco.

The fifth bout was a singles match between Savio Vega and "Stone Cold" Steve Austin. Austin won the bout by technical knockout after hitting Vega with the Million Dollar Championship then applying the Million Dollar Dream to Vega until he passed out.

During and after the fifth bout, footage aired of what was purportedly Piper pursuing Goldust (the actual footage aired was from the Los Angeles Police Department's pursuit of O.J. Simpson in 1994).

The sixth bout was a singles match between Hunter Hearst Helmsley and Ultimate Warrior. Early in the match, Helmsley performed his finishing move, The Pedigree, on Ultimate Warrior. However, Ultimate Warrior no-sold the move and went on to pin Helmsley following a flying shoulder tackle, gorilla press slam, and Warrior Splash.

Bret Hart (left) fought Shawn Michaels in a 60-minute Iron Man match for the WWF Championship at WrestleMania XII.

Following the sixth bout, Todd Pettengill interviewed the debuting Marc Mero backstage. The interview was interrupted by Hunter Hearst Helmsley, resulting in a brawl between Helmsley and Mero.

The seventh bout was a singles match between Diesel and The Undertaker. The Undertaker won the match by pinfall following a chokeslam and Tombstone Piledriver, marking his fifth consecutive win at WrestleMania.

Following the seventh bout, Goldust and Piper arrived at the Arrowhead Pond, with Piper crashing his car into Goldust's car. Piper then chased Goldust to the ring, where the match continued. The match ended when Piper tore off Goldust's bodysuit - revealing him to be wearing woman's lingerie - and gave him a low blow, after which Goldust fled from the ring, leaving Piper the winner.

The main event saw WWF Champion Bret Hart defend his title against Shawn Michaels in an Iron Man match, with the stipulation that whichever wrestler won the most falls in 60 minutes would win the match. Towards the end of the match, with neither men having won any falls, Hart applied his Sharpshooter hold to Michaels, but time expired without Michaels submitting. As Hart began to leave with his title, WWF President Gorilla Monsoon instructed referee Earl Hebner to continue the match under "sudden death" rules, with ring announcer Howard Finkel announcing that "there must be a winner!" The match ended shortly thereafter when Michaels pinned Hart after giving him Sweet Chin Music twice, thus becoming the new WWF Champion.

== Reception ==
WrestleMania XII received generally positive reviews from critics, who aimed praise, particularly at the main event. Rob McNew of 411Mania called the opening match "really good," and gave it 3 and 1/4 stars (out of 5 stars). However, he called the match between Helmsley and Ultimate Warrior the worst of the night, going on to call it the "funniest squash ever, considering that HHH is now arguably a bigger star than Warrior was." He gave the main event the highest score of the night, with 4 stars. However, he says the match "isn't for everyone." Continuing, he says, "It's about a three-star match for the first 40 minutes, the last 20+ are an easy five stars". He gave the entire event a score of 7 out of 10. In 2015, Ryan Dilbert of Bleacher Report called it the 16th greatest of the first 30 WrestleMania events.

While the Iron Man match got positive reviews, PWInsider's Mike Johnson pointed that in the match both wrestlers "were working in spite of each other, not together".

== Results ==
No.	Results	Stipulations	Times
1^{F}	The Bodydonnas (Skip and Zip) (with Sunny) defeated The Godwinns (Henry O. Godwinn and Phineas I. Godwinn) (with Hillbilly Jim) by pinfall	Tag team match for the vacant WWF Tag Team Championship	5:22
2^{F}	The Huckster vs. Nacho Man ended in a no contest	Singles match Billionaire Ted was the special guest referee.	—
3	The British Bulldog, Owen Hart, and Vader (with Jim Cornette) defeated Ahmed Johnson, Jake Roberts, and Yokozuna (with Mr. Fuji) by pinfall	Six-man tag team match Had Yokozuna's team won, he would have received five minutes in the ring with Jim Cornette.	13:08
4	Roddy Piper defeated Goldust (with Marlena) by pinfall (Note: Taped parts of the match were shown intermittently throughout the pay-per-view, with the live part of the match occurring just before the main event.)	"Hollywood Backlot Brawl"	16:47
5	"Stone Cold" Steve Austin (with Ted DiBiase) defeated Savio Vega by technical knockout	Singles match	10:05
6	Ultimate Warrior defeated Hunter Hearst Helmsley (with Sable) by pinfall	Singles match	1:39
7	The Undertaker (with Paul Bearer) defeated Diesel by pinfall	Singles match	16:46
8	Shawn Michaels (with José Lothario) defeated Bret Hart (c) by 1–0 in sudden death overtime	60-minute Iron Man match for the WWF Championship	1:01:56
(c) / – the champion(s) heading into the match; F / – the match was broadcast prior to the pay-per-view on Free for All

=== WWF Tag Team Championship tournament ===
In February 1996, WWF Tag Team Champions The Smoking Gunns were forced to vacate the titles after Billy Gunn sustained a neck injury. As a result, a tournament was staged in February and March 1996 to determine the new champions.

Quarterfinals; Superstars; February 20 – March 10, 1996 (Aired: February 24 – March 16)
The Bodydonnas (Skip and Zip)	Pinfall
The Bushwhackers (Bushwhacker Butch and Bushwhacker Luke)	3:54
Razor Ramon and Savio Vega	Pinfall
Million Dollar Corporation (The 1-2-3 Kid and Tatanka)	5:44
Owen Hart and the British Bulldog	Pinfall
Barry Horowitz and Hakushi	3:16
The Godwinns (Henry O. Godwinn & Phineas I. Godwinn)	Pinfall
The New Rockers (Leif Cassidy & Marty Jannetty)	4:23

Semifinals; Superstars; March 10, 1996 (Aired: March 23–30)
The Bodydonnas	Pinfall
Savio Vega and Steve Austin (Note: Steve Austin replaced Razor Ramon due to a 6-week suspension for drug use.)	4:13
Owen Hart and the British Bulldog	5:30
The Godwinns	Pinfall

Finals; Free For All: WrestleMania XII; March 31, 1996
The Bodydonnas	Pinfall
The Godwinns	5:22

=== Iron Man match ===
Score		Point winner	Decision	Notes	Time
Hart	Michaels	Point winner	Decision	Notes	Time
0	1	Shawn Michaels	Pinfall	Michaels pinned Hart after Sweet Chin Music	1:01:56
