= Camp Cornette =

Professional wrestling stable

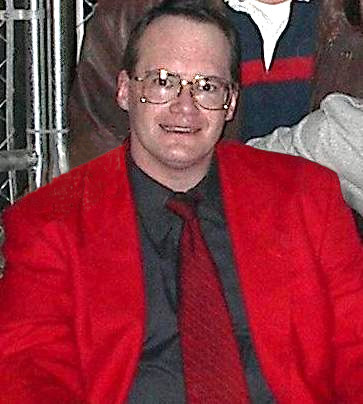
- Jim Cornette, the leader of camp Cornette

Stable
- Members: Owen Hart; Vader; The British Bulldog; Yokozuna; Salvatore Sincere; Jim Cornette (manager); Clarence Mason (legal counsel)
- Name: Camp Cornette
- Debut: April 2, 1995
- Disbanded: January 5, 1997

Camp Cornette was a villainous professional wrestling stable in the World Wrestling Federation (WWF) from 1995 to 1997. The faction was named after its manager, Jim Cornette.

== History ==
James E. Cornette debuted in the World Wrestling Federation (WWF) in 1993 as the villainous Yokozuna's American spokesperson. Cornette began a faction at WrestleMania XI on April 2, 1995, when Yokozuna formed a tag team with Owen Hart and won the WWF Tag Team Championship by defeating the Smoking Gunns (Billy Gunn and Bart Gunn). Cornette began calling the duo of Hart and Yokozuna "Camp Cornette". During their reign, Hart and Yokozuna made successful defenses against teams like the Smoking Gunns at In Your House I, and the Allied Powers (Lex Luger and The British Bulldog) at In Your House 2.

On the August 21, 1995 episode of Monday Night Raw, the main event featured a tag team match pitting the Allied Powers against Men on a Mission (King Mabel and Sir Mo). However, Luger no-showed and was replaced by then WWF Champion Diesel. Bulldog turned on Diesel and became a villain, marking the end of Allied Powers tag team. Bulldog formed an alliance with Cornette and joined Camp Cornette, Originally Men on a Mission were supposed to be bodyguards of Camp Cornette Under Bulldog's "Royal Plan" but got fizzled out right after In Your House 4

At In Your House 3, The British Bulldog substituted for Owen Hart and became Yokozuna's partner during a Tag Team Championship defense against Diesel and Shawn Michaels. Hart came down to the ringside during the match which led to Diesel and Michaels winning the belts as Diesel pinned Hart after a Jackknife. However, since Hart was not the legal man, Hart and Yokozuna were returned the titles. At Survivor Series, problems started rising between Camp Cornette as Bulldog was put in the opponent team of Hart and Yokozuna in a 4-on-4 Survivor Series match. Bulldog was teamed with Shawn Michaels, Ahmed Johnson and Sycho Sid whereas Hart and Yokozuna were teamed with Razor Ramon and Dean Douglas. Michaels, Johnson and Bulldog were the sole survivors of the match.

At 1996 Royal Rumble, Camp Cornette's newest member Vader made his WWF debut as a participant in the Royal Rumble match. Vader fought his teammate Yokozuna causing Yokozuna to leave Camp Cornette and turn into a fan favorite. Yokozuna became Camp Cornette's main enemy. At WrestleMania XII, Vader, Owen Hart and The British Bulldog defeated Yokozuna, Ahmed Johnson and Jake Roberts in a six-man tag team match. Vader and Yokozuna's rivalry culminated in a singles match at In Your House 8, where Yokozuna defeated Vader. However, the power had gone out when the match occurred. Vader defeated Yokozuna in the television airing of the match.

The next feud of Camp Cornette was with People's Posse (Shawn Michaels, Ahmed Johnson and Sycho Sid). Vader, Hart and Bulldog defeated People's Posse in a six-man tag team match at In Your House 9. At the following month's pay-per-view, In Your House 10: Mind Games, Hart and Bulldog were swindled away from Cornette by Clarence Mason. Cornette continued to manage Vader until Vader replaced Cornette with Paul Bearer as his new manager.

== Championships and accomplishments ==
- World Wrestling Federation
  - WWF Tag Team Championship (2 times) – Owen Hart and Yokozuna

== See also ==
- The Heenan Family
