= In Your House 2 =

1995 World Wrestling Federation pay-per-view event

- VHS cover featuring various WWF wrestlers
- Promotion: World Wrestling Federation
- Date: July 23, 1995
- City: Nashville, Tennessee
- Venue: Nashville Municipal Auditorium
- Attendance: 6,482
- Buy rate: 280,000

Pay-per-view chronology
← Previous; King of the Ring	Next → SummerSlam

In Your House chronology
← Previous; 1	Next → 3

In Your House 2, retroactively titled In Your House 2: The Lumberjacks, was a 1995 professional wrestling pay-per-view (PPV) event produced by the World Wrestling Federation (WWF, renamed WWE in 2002). It was the second In Your House and took place on July 23, 1995, at the Nashville Municipal Auditorium in Nashville, Tennessee. The event's retroactive renaming was in reference to the main event being a Lumberjack match.

The pay-per-view broadcast consisted of six professional wrestling matches, while four dark matches also occurred. In the aforementioned main event, Diesel defeated Sid to retain the WWF Championship. On the undercard, Shawn Michaels defeated Jeff Jarrett for the Intercontinental Championship, and The Roadie defeated 1–2–3 Kid. Both Jarrett and the Roadie legit quit WWF the following day.

The pay-per-view received a 0.7 buyrate, equivalent to approximately 280,000 buys.

== Production ==
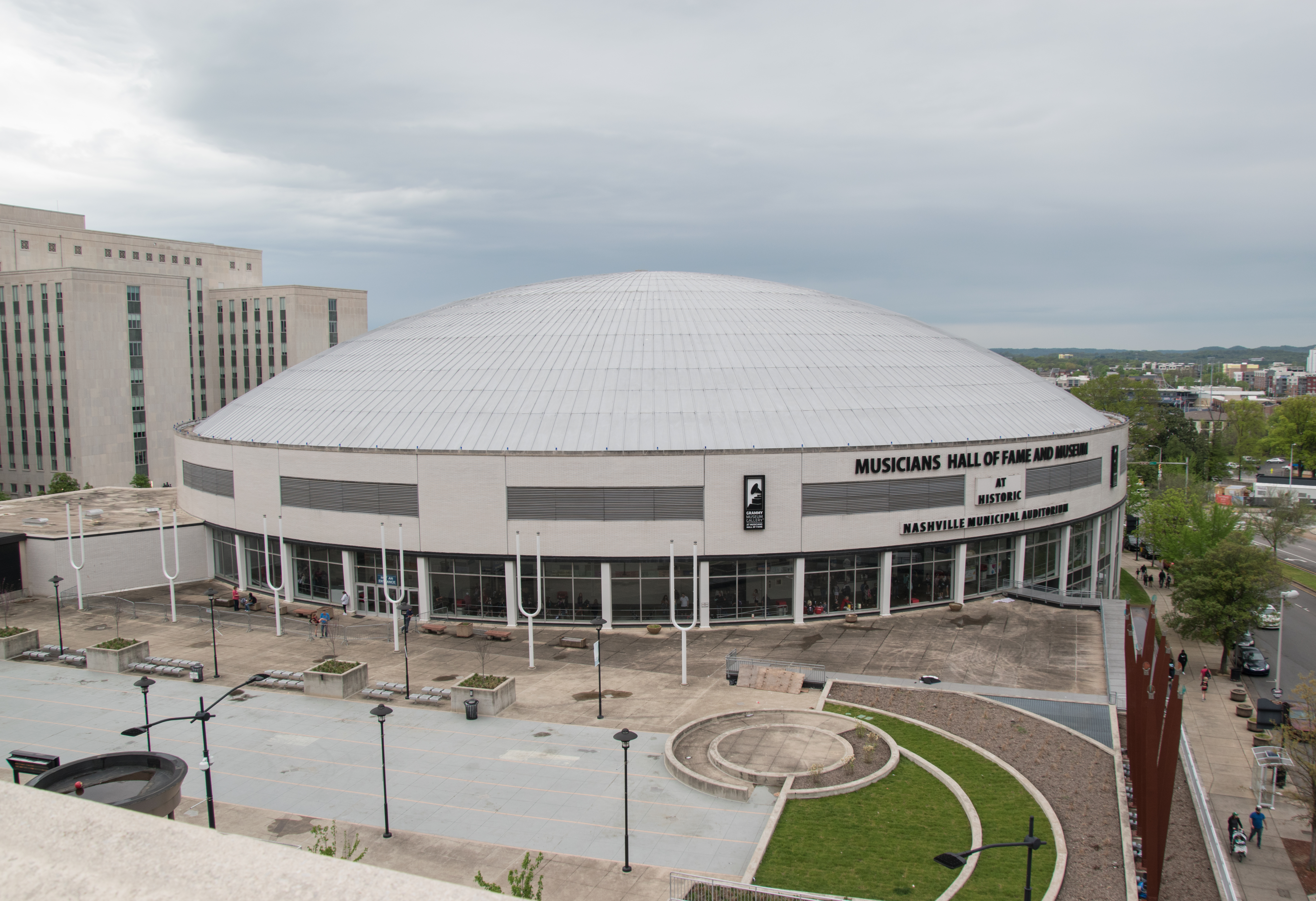
The second In Your House took place at the Nashville Municipal Auditorium in Nashville, Tennessee.

=== Background ===
In May 1995, the professional wrestling promotion World Wrestling Federation (WWF, renamed WWE in 2002) held its first In Your House pay-per-view (PPV) event. This was the start of a series of monthly PPV shows that aired when the promotion was not holding one of its then-five major PPVs, referred to as the "Big Five": WrestleMania, King of the Ring, SummerSlam, Survivor Series, and Royal Rumble. The In Your House shows were also sold at a lower cost than the Big Five. The second In Your House was scheduled for July 23, 1995, at the Nashville Municipal Auditorium in Nashville, Tennessee. While this event was originally known simply as In Your House 2, it was later retroactively renamed as In Your House 2: The Lumberjacks in reference to the main event being a Lumberjack match.

=== Storylines ===
The most prominent feud heading into the pay-per-view was between reigning WWF Champion Diesel, and Sid. At WrestleMania XI, Diesel had retained the championship against his former partner, Shawn Michaels, partly due to an interference by Michaels' bodyguard Sid backfiring. When Michaels said that for a potential rematch, he would give Sid the night off, he was attacked by his bodyguard, and eventually saved by Diesel. This turned Michaels, who had been a heel for over three years, into a face, and set up a title match between Diesel and Sid, now a member of Ted DiBiase's Million Dollar Corporation. At the first In Your House in May, Diesel successfully retained the WWF Championship, when an interference by fellow Corporation member Tatanka resulted in Sid being disqualified. At King of the Ring in late June, Sid and Tantanka were defeated by Diesel and Bam Bam Bigelow in a tag team match. A rematch between Diesel and Sid was scheduled for In Your House 2, but as a Lumberjack match. In the following weeks, both rivals chose 14 lumberjacks, who would surround the ring during the match.

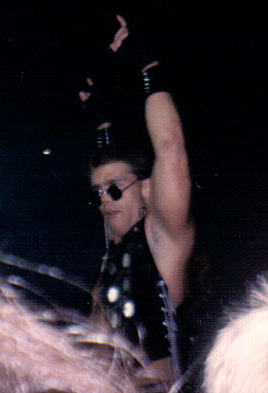
Shawn Michaels, who faced Jeff Jarrett for the WWF Intercontinental Championship at In Your House 2.

At the first In Your House, Razor Ramon and the 1–2–3 Kid had been scheduled to team against reigning WWF Intercontinental Champion Jeff Jarrett and his Roadie, but as the Kid was unable to wrestle due to the Kid's (legit) neck injury, the match was changed to a Handicap match, which Ramon won. After the match, an unknown man, later revealed as Savio Vega, attacked both Jarrett and The Roadie before being escorted backstage. During a match between Vega and Jarrett on Raw, Roadie pushed Vega into guest commentator Shawn Michaels, who in turn shoved the Roadie away and later on attacked both Roadie and Jarrett. At the same time, Jarrett also focused on his music career. On the July 1, 1995, episode of Superstars of Wrestling, Jarrett's music video for his song "With My Baby Tonight" premiered for the first time. The music video played over again at forthcoming WWF shows during July 1995.

At King of the Ring, Mabel, one half of the Men on a Mission tag team, won the eponymous tournament, defeating Savio Vega in the finals. After the match, Mabel and his partner Mo assaulted Razor Ramon, who was at ringside supporting Vega during the match. The 1–2–3 Kid also returned and tried to help Ramon, but Men on a Mission had the upper hand. The assault on Ramon further injured his ribs after suffering an injury on June 9, 1995. The attack led to a tag team match at the second In Your House pay-per-view, with Ramon and Vega teaming up to take on Men on a Mission.

At Wrestlemania XI, Owen Hart and Yokozuna had joined forces to win the WWF Tag Team Championship from the Smoking Gunns. The Allied Powers, consisting of Lex Luger and The British Bulldog, seemed as obvious challengers. Luger had feuded with Yokozuna over the WWF Championship between 1993 and 1994, whereas Bulldog had supported his brother-in-law Bret Hart in his feud against Bret's brother Owen. At Wrestlemania XI, the Allied Powers proved themselves by defeating the Blu Brothers and were given a title shot at this event.

== Event ==
=== Dark match ===
Before the event went live on pay-per-view, Skip, who was accompanied to the ring by his valet Sunny, defeated Aldo Montoya and Hunter Hearst Helmsley defeated Bob Holly in a dark matches.

=== Preliminary matches ===
The pay-per-view started with a Singles match between the Roadie, and the 1–2–3 Kid. 1–2–3 Kid surprised the Roadie with an attack outside the ring and had the early advantage, but the Roadie soon took control, performing a clothesline, grounding Kid. At several points during the match, Jeff Jarrett was shown preparing for his performance of "With My Baby Tonight" in his dressing room, ignoring The Roadie's performance. At the end of the match, Kid missed a dropkick from the second-rope. The Roadie capitalized with a powerbomb and a piledriver off the top rope, allowing him to pin the Kid.

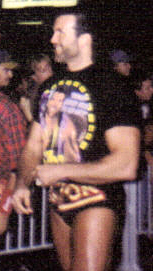
Razor Ramon, who teamed up with Savio Vega to take on Men on a Mission at In Your House 2

In the second pay-per-view match Men on a Mission (King Mabel and Sir Mo) faced Razor Ramon and Savio Vega. Mabel and Mo had the upper hand throughout most of the match, with Mabel dominating Vega. Vega eventually managed to tag in Ramon, who got control and powerslammed Mabel from the top rope. The advantage for Ramon and Vega was short-lived, as Mabel executed an avalanche on Ramon in the corner, followed by a belly to belly suplex to get the victory.

After the second match, WWF Intercontinental Champion Jeff Jarrett made his live singing debut, performing the song "With My Baby Tonight". Notably, Jarrett's personal enforcer, remained unseen during the performance.

Next, Bam Bam Bigelow squared off against Henry O. Godwinn. After several near-falls from both Bigelow and Godwinn, Godwinn missed a knee drop from the second rope. Bigelow capitalized by rolling up Godwinn for the win. That ending was rushed, i.e. not planned, as Godwinn had sustained a legit injury during the missed knee drop.

In the following match, Jeff Jarrett (accompanied by the Roadie) defended his Intercontinental Championship against Shawn Michaels. The match first went back and forth, with both Michaels and Jarrett taking control for certain periods. The first highspot occurred when Jarrett backdropped Michaels over the top rope to the arena floor. Throughout the match, the Roadie distracted the referee, allowing Jarrett to perform illegal tactics to gain an advantage. Michaels managed to escape a sleeper hold minutes later, gaining the upper hand in the process. After several highspot moves by Michaels, The Roadie shook the ring-ropes while Michaels was on the top rope, grounding Michaels in the process. Jarrett attempted to regain the advantage by performing the Figure four leglock, but Michaels reversed the hold into a near-fall. Jarrett went for the submission hold again, but Michaels shoved him into the referee, sending the official to the ground. Michaels tried to seize the advantage with a Superkick, but the Roadie grabbed Michaels. Jarrett performed a Crossbody, getting a near-fall in the process. The finish to the match came when the Roadie accidentally tripped Jarrett. Jarrett got back up only to walk into Michaels's Superkick. Michaels pinned him and became Intercontinental Champion. It was revealed later in the show that Jarrett and The Roadie were involved in a backstage confrontation with each other, signaling an end to their on-screen friendship.

Other on-screen personnel
Role:	Name:
Commentator	Vince McMahon
Commentator	Jerry Lawler
Commentator	Gorilla Monsoon (Coliseum Video release)
Commentator	Stan Lane (Coliseum Video release)
Interviewer	Todd Pettengill
Interviewer	Dok Hendrix
Ring announcer	Howard Finkel

Next, Owen Hart and Yokozuna, accompanied by Jim Cornette and Mr. Fuji, defended their WWF Tag Team Championship against the Allied Powers (Lex Luger and The British Bulldog). The challengers got the advantage early on, with Luger wearing down Yokozuna by smashing Yokozuna's head into the top turnbuckle. Yokozuna accidentally fell onto Hart's foot, sparking a confrontation between the tag team partners. After a few minutes, the two settled their differences, the challengers retained the advantage for much of the match. The finish came after the Allied Powers double-teamed on Yokozuna. Following a back suplex, the referee ordered Bulldog, who wasn't the legal man, out of the ring. Hart hit the distracted Luger with a double axe handle from the top rope, allowing Yokozuna to pin Luger with a leg drop.

=== Main event ===
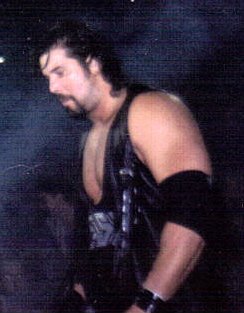
Diesel, who defended the WWF Championship against Sid in a Lumberjack match.

In the main event, Diesel defended the WWF Championship against Sycho Sid in a Lumberjack match. After back-and-forth action during the first few minutes, which included each wrestler being attacked by opposing lumberjacks, Diesel performed a suicide dive over the top rope onto all of Sid's lumberjacks. The champion continued to attack Sid's lumberjacks, but King Mabel intervened, tossing Diesel into the steel steps. Sid attempted to capitalize by performing his finishing move, the Powerbomb. Instead of pinning his opponent, Sid high fived his lumberjacks on the outside, giving Diesel time to recover and kick out at the two-count. After a second attempted Powerbomb by Sid was countered, the match spilled outside of the ring: Sid got into a brawl with Diesel's lumberjacks. Shawn Michaels, one of Diesel's lumberjacks hit Sid with a double axe handle off the top rope. Some of Sid's lumberjacks, including Tatanka and Irwin R. Schyster, attacked Diesel, who fought them off. Diesel performed a big boot, pinning Sid to retain the WWF Championship. Diesel celebrated with his lumberjacks after the match ended.

=== Dark matches ===
There were two more matches at the arena after the pay-per-view event went off the air. It was later part of the In Your House 2 video released by Coliseum Video: Bret Hart wrestled Jean-Pierre Lafitte. Lafitte held control for most of the match, but Hart gained the advantage near the end as Lafitte missed a diving crossbody. Hart capitalized, pinning Lafitte via a roll-up.

The final match was a Casket match between The Undertaker (accompanied by manager Paul Bearer) and Kama (accompanied by Ted DiBiase). Kama attempted to perform The Undertaker's finishing move, the Tombstone Piledriver, but The Undertaker reversed it, chokeslamming Kama. The Undertaker then performed a big boot to Kama, which sent him into the casket, meaning The Undertaker won the match.

== Reception ==
The pay-per-view garnered 280,000 buys, which is equivalent to a 0.7 buyrate. The buyrate was down from the inaugural In Your House event, which attracted 332,000 buys. The buyrate was slightly better though than the King of the Ring pay-per-view, which aired the previous month and attracted 260,000 buys, equivalent to a 0.65 buyrate.

== Aftermath ==
After In Your House 2, both Diesel, and Sid moved on to new feuds. Diesel entered a program with the King of the Ring winner, Mabel, who was receiving a push at the time. The two faced for the WWF Championship at SummerSlam; Diesel retained the title, pinning Mabel after a clothesline off the second rope. The feud that was set to take shape after In Your House 2 between Jeff Jarrett, and the Roadie never began, as both legit quit the WWF, with Jarrett leaving for "personal reasons". Jarrett took time off until December 1995, while the Roadie returned in late 1996. The storyline was then written so that it would later be revealed that Jarrett was lip-syncing to The Roadie, which would start a feud between the two.

== Results ==
No.	Results	Stipulations	Times
1^{D}	Skip (with Sunny) defeated Aldo Montoya	Singles match	4:00
2^{D}	Hunter Hearst Helmsley defeated Bob Holly	Singles match	7:03
3	The Roadie defeated The 1–2–3 Kid	Singles match	7:26
4	Men on a Mission (King Mabel and Sir Mo) defeated Razor Ramon and Savio Vega	Tag team match	10:09
5	Bam Bam Bigelow defeated Henry O. Godwinn	Singles match	5:33
6	Shawn Michaels defeated Jeff Jarrett (c) (with The Roadie)	Singles match for the WWF Intercontinental Championship	20:01
7	Owen Hart and Yokozuna (c) (with Mr. Fuji and Jim Cornette) defeated The Allied Powers (Lex Luger and The British Bulldog)	Tag team match for the WWF Tag Team Championship	10:54
8	Diesel (c) defeated Sycho Sid (with Ted DiBiase)	Lumberjack match for the WWF Championship (Note: The lumberjacks were: Eli Blu, King Mabel, Sir Mo, Irwin R. Schyster, Kama, King Kong Bundy, Tatanka, Henry O. Godwinn, Rad Radford, Skip, Tom Prichard, Jimmy Del Ray, Jacob Blu, Jean-Pierre Lafitte, Mantaur, Hunter Hearst Helmsley, Bam Bam Bigelow, Razor Ramon, Savio Vega, The 1–2–3 Kid, Man Mountain Rock, Adam Bomb, Bob Holly, Duke Droese, Fatu, Billy Gunn, Bart Gunn, Travis, Troy, and Shawn Michaels.)	10:06
9^{D}	Bret Hart defeated Jean-Pierre Lafitte	Singles match	13:26
10^{D}	The Undertaker (with Paul Bearer) defeated Kama (with Ted DiBiase)	Casket match	14:50
(c) / – the champion(s) heading into the match; D / – this was a dark match
