= Lex Luger =

American professional wrestler and football player (born 1958)

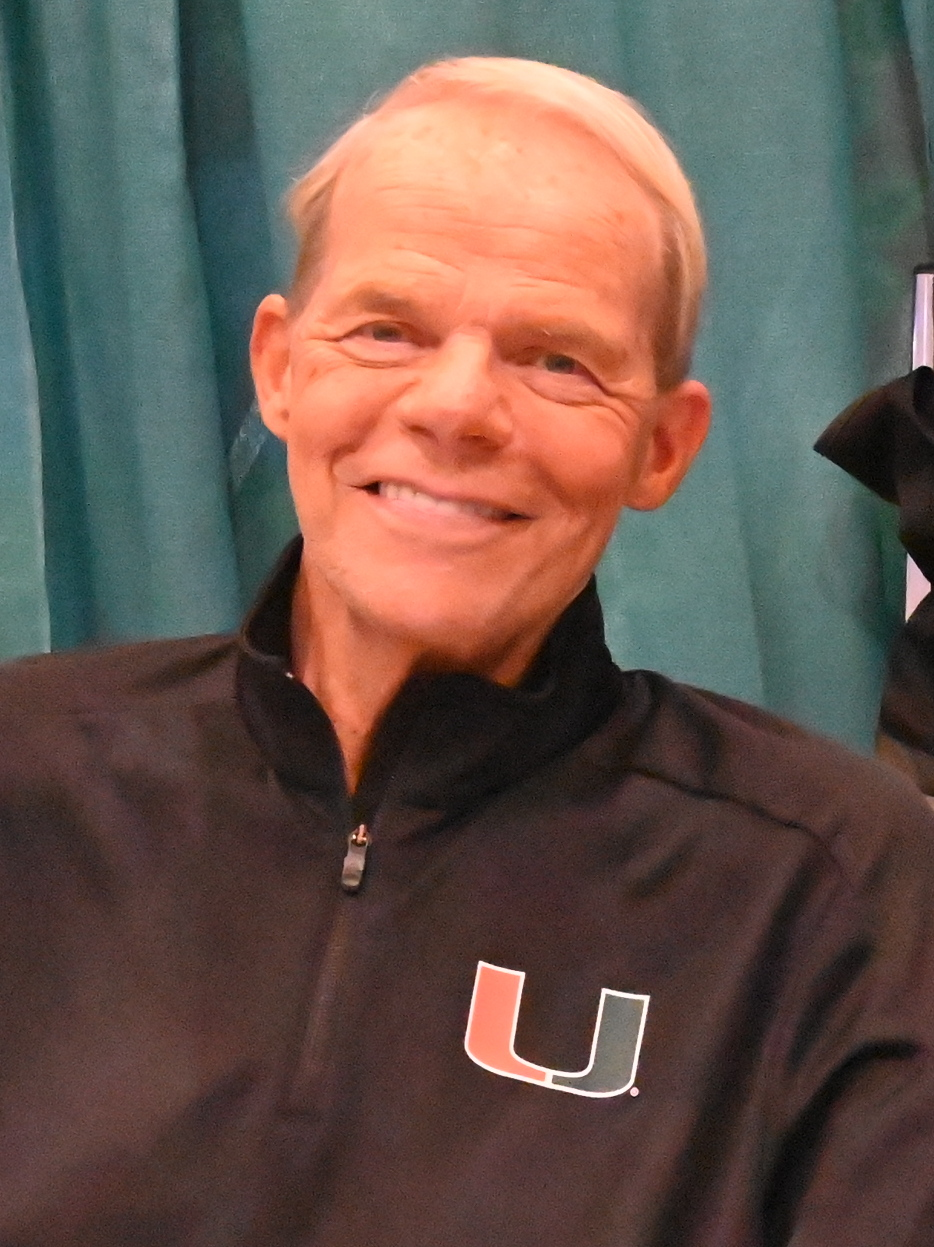
- Luger in 2021
- Born: Lawrence Wendell Pfohl; June 2, 1958 (age 68); Buffalo, New York, U.S.
- Spouse: Peggy Fulbright (m. 1979; div. 2003)
- Partner: Elizabeth Hulette (1999–2003; Hulette's death)
- Children: 2
- Professional wrestling career
- Ring name(s): Lex Lugar; Lex Luger; The Lugar; The Narcissist; The Total Package
- Billed height: 6 ft 6 in (198 cm)
- Billed weight: 275 lb (125 kg)
- Billed from: Atlanta, Georgia; Chicago, Illinois
- Trained by: Barry Windham; Bob Roop; Hiro Matsuda
- Debut: October 31, 1985
- Retired: 2006
- Football career

No. 66
- Position: Offensive lineman

Personal information
- Listed height: 6 ft 3 in (1.91 m)
- Listed weight: 270 lb (122 kg)

Career information
- High school: Orchard Park (NY)
- College: Miami
- NFL draft: 1979: undrafted

Career history
- Montreal Alouettes (1979–1981); Green Bay Packers (1982–1983)*; Tampa Bay Bandits (1984); Memphis Showboats (1984–1985); Jacksonville Bulls (1985)
- * Offseason or practice squad member only

Lawrence Wendell Pfohl (born June 2, 1958), better known by the ring name Lex Luger, is an American retired professional wrestler, bodybuilder, and professional football lineman. He is best known for his work with World Championship Wrestling (WCW), National Wrestling Alliance (NWA) under Jim Crockett Promotions, and the World Wrestling Federation (WWF, now WWE).

Luger is a two-time WCW World Heavyweight Champion and one-time WWA World Heavyweight Champion. He is also a five-time NWA/WCW United States Heavyweight Champion who holds the records for consecutive days and total days as champion. He is the second WCW Triple Crown Champion. Although he never won a championship in the WWF, he challenged for every title in the organization, including WWF World Heavyweight Championship matches at SummerSlam in 1993, which he also main-evented alongside Yokozuna, and WrestleMania X in 1994. He also was notably the 1994 Royal Rumble co-winner with Bret Hart.

Pro Wrestling Illustrated readers voted Luger the Most Popular Wrestler of the Year in 1993. Luger was inducted into the WWE Hall of Fame in 2025.

== Early life and education ==
Of German and Scottish heritage, Lawrence Wendell Pfohl was born in Buffalo, New York on June 2, 1958. He was an avid basketball player in his youth, and though he rarely played soccer, is a fan of English soccer club Manchester United. He attended high school and played basketball and football in Orchard Park. However, during his senior year his football coach convinced him to dedicate himself to the sport for the chance at a college scholarship. Pfohl and his teammate Craig Wolfley then began intense weight training with World's Strongest Man competitor Don Reinhoudt.

He received scholarship offers from Boston College, Miami and Penn State. Ultimately deciding to attended Penn State University on a football scholarship, but transferred to the University of Miami after his freshman year when the Penn State coaches thought he should move to linebacker or defensive end. He eventually decided his skills would be better suited to football. He sat out the 1977 season as a redshirt transfer student in Coral Gables.

In 1978, Luger played for the Miami Hurricanes, which featured future Pro Football Hall of Fame quarterback Jim Kelly, Jim Burt, Mitch Guittar, Fred Marion, and Mark Richt. He was kicked off the team for what Luger referred to as "off-the-field incidents". On the team's road trip to Atlanta to play Georgia Tech, Luger, who was suffering from cabin fever and disappointed at not being named a starter by coach Lou Saban by the 5th game of the season, snapped and trashed his hotel room. Luger left Miami without a degree.

== Professional football career ==
Upon leaving Miami, he played professional football for the Montreal Alouettes of the Canadian Football League where he dressed for 14 games at guard & tackle over 3 seasons and played in the 67th Grey Cup against the Edmonton Eskimos. He played in 2 games in 1981 for Montreal before being released. He then signed with the Green Bay Packers of the National Football League, but never played in a game and thus is not listed on their all-time roster, though he did spend the entire 1982 season on the team's injured reserve list with a groin problem incurred during training camp. He returned to the Packers training camp in 1983, but he was released before the regular season began. Luger wore number 66 for the Packers, the last player to do so before it was retired for Ray Nitschke.

Luger said in a 2018 interview with the Green Bay Press-Gazette his wrestling career might have never happened had it worked out with the Packers:

"I would have loved to have had a long-term career with the Packers; are you kidding me?" Pfohl said. "If I did, I probably wouldn't have become a wrestler. So, in the big picture, it worked out for me in that regard ... Had it worked out in Green Bay, I seriously doubt I would have become a pro wrestler."

In 1984, Luger finished his football career playing in the United States Football League for the Tampa Bay Bandits, Memphis Showboats and Jacksonville Bulls. He was a teammate of future WCW rival Ron Simmons while playing for the Tampa Bay Bandits.

== Professional wrestling career ==
=== NWA Championship Wrestling from Florida (1985–1987) ===
In 1985, Luger walked into the Championship Wrestling From Florida office where he met Hiro Matsuda, who had previously trained Hulk Hogan and "Mr. Wonderful" Paul Orndorff. Luger adopted the ring name "Lex Luger", being a fan of the comic book villain Lex Luthor, which helped cast him as a typical wrestling heel which he would continue to be throughout most of his early years in wrestling. Luger made his in-ring debut in September 1985. He was featured alongside other notorious heels, Percy Pringle and Rick Rude.

Luger began wrestling for CWF, gaining his first victory on October 31, 1985, against Cocoa Samoa and later won the Southern Heavyweight Championship from Wahoo McDaniel the next month. For a short time, he feuded with Barry Windham before Luger turned face and began teaming up with Windham against Sir Oliver Humperdink and his team of Ed "The Bull" Gantner, Kareem Muhammed, and The White Ninja. On September 1, 1986, he fought NWA World Heavyweight Champion Ric Flair for the title at Battle of the Belts III, which resulted in a 60-minute draw. As a result, Flair retained the title. Towards the end of his run in Florida, Luger was involved in angles with Kevin Sullivan and Bad News Allen. He was also in a steel cage match with Bruiser Brody, where Brody stopped cooperating, leading to Luger climbing over the cage and leaving the match.

=== Jim Crockett Promotions / World Championship Wrestling (1987–1992) ===
==== The Four Horsemen (1987) ====
In 1987, Luger went to work for Jim Crockett Promotions (JCP), which was under the NWA banner, with the nickname "The Total Package" and began using "The Human Torture Rack", an Argentine backbreaker rack, as his finisher. He turned heel again upon arrival in JCP and was first booked as an associate to Ric Flair's "Four Horsemen" stable until Ole Anderson was kicked out and he became an official member of the group.

Luger's first major feud in JCP was with Nikita Koloff, whom he defeated for the NWA United States Heavyweight Championship on July 11, 1987. Manager J. J. Dillon threw a chair over the top of the cage while the referee, Earl Hebner, was down. Luger knocked Koloff unconscious with it and then lifted up Koloff in the Torture Rack. A revived Hebner then dropped Koloff's arm three times with no response and awarded Luger a submission victory. He held the title until JCP's first pay-per-view event Starrcade '87: Chi-Town Heat in November 1987, when he dropped it to Dusty Rhodes in a steel cage. This loss set the stage for Luger leaving the Four Horsemen, as manager Dillon's interference cost Luger the match. A steel chair thrown in by Dillon was dropped by Luger and Rhodes DDT'd Luger on it prior to pinning him for the win.

==== Feud with the Four Horsemen (1987–1988) ====
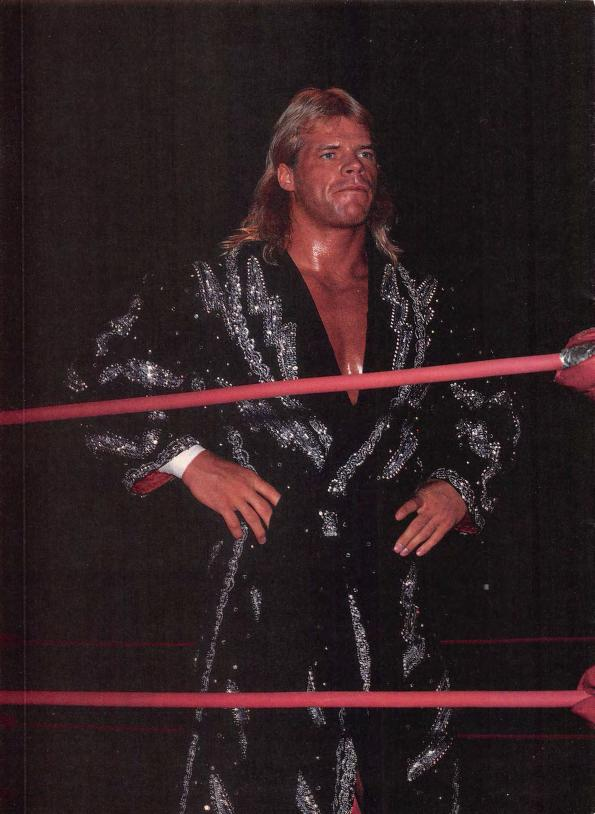
Luger, c. 1988

Luger left the Four Horsemen and turned face again on December 2, 1987, at the Knight Centre in Miami, Florida, after he and his stablemates (Tully Blanchard, Arn Anderson, and Dillon) were the sole wrestlers left in a Bunkhouse Stampede battle royal and Dillon asked the other wrestlers to eliminate themselves so he could win. Although Blanchard and Anderson complied, Luger refused and eliminated Dillon, leaving the Horsemen in the process.

Luger then befriended Barry Windham, his former Florida ally, and together they formed a tag team, dubbed The Twin Towers. Their first match as a team was on February 3, 1988, at a TV taping at WTBS Studios in Atlanta. On March 27, 1988, at Clash of the Champions I they defeated Tully Blanchard and Arn Anderson for the NWA World Tag Team Championship. Only a few weeks after the title win, Windham suddenly turned on Luger during a title defense (against Blanchard and Anderson, who regained the title as a result) and joining Luger's former stable, The Four Horsemen. Days later, the Jim Crockett Sr. Memorial Cup Tag Team Tournament was held with its first night in Greenville, South Carolina. A partner-less Luger was teamed with Sting (whose partner Ronnie Garvin had been kayfabe injured) and the impromptu team won the entire tournament, defeating Blanchard and Anderson in the finals.

Luger continued his feud with the Four Horsemen and Windham. At the June 8 Clash of the Champions II: Miami Mayhem, it was announced that Luger would challenge Four Horsemen leader Ric Flair for the NWA World Heavyweight Championship at The Great American Bash on July 10 in Baltimore. As Luger arrived at The Clash in a limousine he was attacked by the Four Horsemen, leaving him injured and bleeding in the parking lot on live television. While Luger had Flair in the "Torture Rack" and Flair was about to submit, the match was abruptly stopped by the referee who cited (kayfabe) "Maryland State Athletic Commission" rules about a cut that had opened up on Luger's forehead "bleeding excessively". In November 1988, Jim Crockett Jr. sold JCP to Turner Broadcasting System, ultimately the promotion was renamed to World Championship Wrestling (WCW). The feud with Flair came to an end after December's Starrcade '88: True Gritt where Flair pinned Luger in a rematch main event for the NWA title by illegally using the ropes.

==== United States Heavyweight Champion (1989–1990) ====
Luger faced old foe Barry Windham at Chi-Town Rumble winning his second NWA United States Heavyweight Championship from him. He teamed up with Michael P.S. Hayes against Barry and Kendall Windham in a match, televised on March 18, 1989, which saw Hayes turn on Luger, setting himself as a contender to the U.S. Title. Hayes defeated Luger for the US title at WrestleWar 1989: Music City Showdown when a surprise appearance by Hayes's ex-Freebird teammate Terry Gordy helped cost Luger the match. Luger regained the U.S. Title from Hayes in a rematch a couple of weeks later when he broke the rules by pulling Hayes's tights while pinning Hayes to win the match. On the June 14 Clash of the Champions VII: Guts and Glory, Luger attacked the popular Ricky "The Dragon" Steamboat after Steamboat had defeated Terry Funk by disqualification, turning Luger heel again. Luger and Steamboat faced each other at The Great American Bash in July with Luger winning by disqualification after Luger refused to wrestle Steamboat until the match's no-disqualification clause had been waived.

Flyin' Brian Pillman challenged Luger at Halloween Havoc 1989: Settling the Score for the US Title, which Luger won. He also defeated Pillman in a rematch on the November 15 Clash of the Champions IX: New York Knockout to retain the title and end the feud. After the main event of the card, which saw Ric Flair and Terry Funk in an "I Quit" match, Luger made a surprise run in, attacking both Flair and Sting, who had come out to save Flair from a post match attack by The Great Muta. December's Starrcade '89: Future Shock featured an "Ironman" tournament between Flair, Sting, Luger, and Muta.

Though Sting eventually won the tournament, Luger was the only participant to go undefeated (Sting got pinfall victories over Muta and Flair, giving him the most points to win the tournament). This elevated Sting to the status of No. 1 contender for Flair's world title. With Sting and Flair set to square off at WrestleWar in February, Luger was booked to defend the U.S. Title against "Dr. Death" Steve Williams on the card. A legitimate injury to Sting, however, caused the entire booking of the card to get changed. Luger was elevated to face Flair for the NWA World Heavyweight Championship. An injured Sting appeared in Luger's corner during the match, eventually being attacked by Ole and Arn Anderson. When Luger left the ring to help Sting he was counted out, giving the match to Flair. The idea here was to build Luger up as a "changed man" who had "gained self-respect" by saving Sting in another face turn. In the final match of the feud, a few months later at the Capital Combat event in Washington, D.C., Luger won by disqualification against Flair in a steel cage match when the cage rose up from the ground and outside interference by the Four Horsemen marred the match.

Luger eventually dropped the title to Stan Hansen at Halloween Havoc, though he won it back at Starrcade '90: Collision Course beginning his fourth NWA United States Heavyweight Championship reign. Luger's third title reign lasted a total of 523 days, making him the longest reigning United States Champion in history. During this reign, WCW rebranded the championships they owned and controlled, and the title was renamed the WCW United States Heavyweight Championship. Luger started a feud with Dan Spivey, whom he defeated at WrestleWar to retain the U.S. Title. Following their match, Nikita Koloff was due to present a new championship belt to Luger, but during the ceremony he suddenly attacked the champion, reigniting their feud from 1987. It did not last long, however, as Koloff found himself being pushed into an angle with Sting instead of Luger, which began at SuperBrawl I: Return of the Rising Sun when Sting and Luger challenged The Steiner Brothers for the WCW World Tag Team Championship. During the match, Koloff interfered and hit Sting with a chain, which was intended for Luger.

==== World Heavyweight Champion (1991–1992) ====
Luger again began to challenge Ric Flair for the WCW World Heavyweight Championship after becoming No.1 contender by defeating The Great Muta on the June 14, 1991 Clash of the Champions XV: Knocksville USA. Luger's title match against Flair was set to be contested at The Great American Bash in a steel cage match with the added stipulation that, should Flair get disqualified he would lose the title. The match never occurred, however, as Flair began to have disagreements with Jim Herd, the head of WCW, over his future and salary. He eventually quit the company (being "stripped" of the title in the process) and took the world title belt with him.

With the WCW World Heavyweight Championship now vacant, Barry Windham was declared the No. 2 contender and was set to face Luger in the cage match at The Great American Bash. During the match, Harley Race and Mr. Hughes came to ringside. While Hughes kept Windham's attention, Race told Luger that "now is the time" to perform a piledriver on the distracted Windham. Luger did so and won the match, thereby winning his first WCW World Heavyweight Championship and resulting in a double turn where Luger turned heel and enlisted Race as his manager while the then-heel Windham turned face. As Flair still had the original championship belt and the new belt was not ready in time, Luger initially wore the NWA Western States Heritage Championship belt, which had been altered to resemble the world title.

After Luger won the world title, his first major challenge came from Ron Simmons. At a signing ceremony for their title match at Halloween Havoc in a two out of three falls match, there was a controversial angle where Luger invited Simmons, once his challenge had been turned back, to join his entourage, but as a chauffeur. Luger went on to retain the championship in the match by two falls to one. Eventually, Luger began to have his own issues with WCW, and the contract he had seemed to have him wrestling less and less while still collecting money. After ending his feud with Simmons, Luger had a brief feud with Rick Steiner, defeating him on the November 19 Clash of the Champions XVII. Luger's contract only required him to work a specific number of dates, and having fulfilled them he "sat out" the beginning of 1992. Aside from one title defense against Masahiro Chono at WCW/New Japan Supershow II (Starrcade in Tokyo Dome), Luger did not wrestle a match from Starrcade '91: Battlebowl – The Lethal Lottery until SuperBrawl II, where he lost his WCW title to Sting.

=== World Bodybuilding Federation (1992) ===
After losing to Sting at SuperBrawl, Luger negotiated a departure from WCW and joined Vince McMahon's World Bodybuilding Federation (WBF), appearing regularly as a co-host on its Saturday morning program, WBF BodyStars. He also made an appearance at WrestleMania VIII, taking part in an on-air interview with Bobby "The Brain" Heenan and Gorilla Monsoon. Heenan and Luger formed an alliance in the WBF (similar to Heenan's alliance with Ric Flair in the WWF). He was slated to guest pose at a WBF pay-per-view event, but was injured in a motorcycle accident. By the time he recovered, the WBF was out of business.

=== World Wrestling Federation (1993–1995) ===
==== The Narcissist (1993) ====
After his accident and the closure of the WBF, Luger joined the World Wrestling Federation (WWF). Bobby "The Brain" Heenan unveiled him with the persona of "Narcissus" at the 1993 Royal Rumble. Shortly thereafter, his name was altered slightly to "The Narcissist". Luger posed before full-length mirrors before every match. In his televised in-ring debut, he defeated jobber Larry Lunden on the February 13 episode of Superstars. The WWF also incorporated his motorcycle accident into his gimmick, capitalizing on the fact that he had a "metal plate" inserted into his forearm which was said to cause more damage when it struck an opponent, often allowing Luger to pin them with only his little finger placed on their chest. This caused a number of his opponents to demand that he wear a cover over it during matches when he had a streak of knocking people out. This eventually led to WWF officials demanding that Luger wear an elbow pad, though he would often remove it.

The Narcissist's one major feud was with Mr. Perfect. The feud was based on Heenan, his advisor, referring to him as being "Beyond Perfection", in a slight at Mr. Perfect, his former managerial client. The rivalry ended at WrestleMania IX when Luger defeated Perfect and then after the match Perfect ran backstage and then was attacked by Luger and Shawn Michaels outside a storage garage. Following the event, Luger defeated Bob Backlund via count-out to qualify for the King of the Ring tournament, where he wrestled Tatanka to a double count-out in the opening round.

==== The All-American (1993–1994) ====
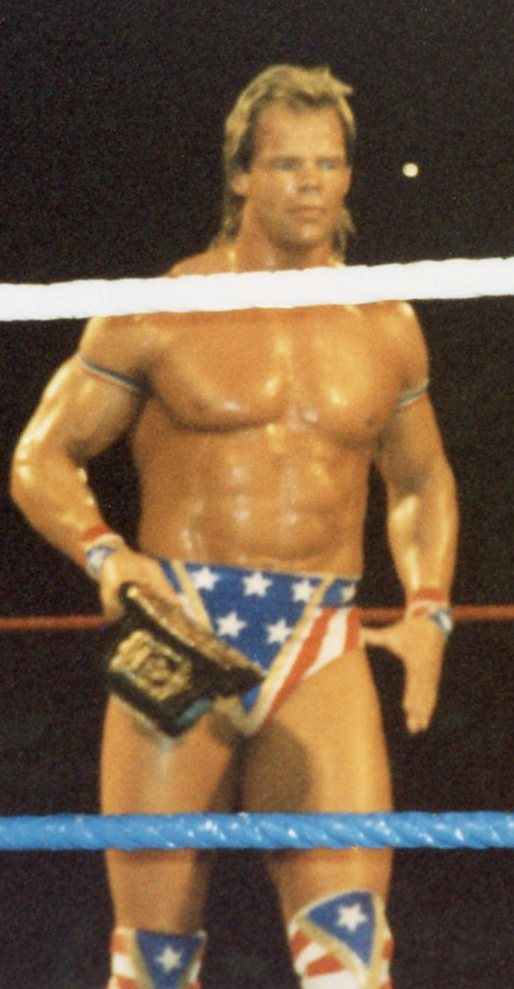
Luger in his All-American attire

In mid-1993, after Hulk Hogan's departure from the company, Luger was transformed into a fan-favorite character with the nicknames "Made in the USA" and "The All-American" also "American Original". On July 4, he took part in an event where he arrived by helicopter on the deck of the USS Intrepid and body slammed the near 600 pound (270 kg) WWF World Heavyweight Champion Yokozuna after a number of WWF wrestlers as well as other athletes from the NBA and NFL attempted and failed. Following this, he began the "Lex Express" tour, traveling the country in a red, white, and blue painted Silver Eagle Model 10 bus to greet fans in preparation for his shot at the WWF World Heavyweight Championship at SummerSlam 1993. The match had the stipulation that this would be Luger's only shot at the title. Luger, with the use of the metal plate in his forearm, eventually won the match by knocking out Yokozuna, who failed to return to the ring by the count of 10. As WWF titles could only change hands by submission or pinning, Yokozuna kept the belt. According to Bruce Prichard, Vince McMahon didn't give the title to Luger despite his push because Luger wasn't getting over with audiences as expected.

In late 1993, Luger began a feud with Ludvig Borga, another "anti-American" foreigner from Finland. At Survivor Series 1993, Luger captained a team dubbed "All-Americans" (Luger, The Undertaker, and The Steiner Brothers) against Yokozuna's team "Foreign Fanatics" (Crush, Yokozuna, Ludvig Borga, and Quebecer Jacques) in a 4-on-4 Survivor Series match. Luger's team won the match after he pinned Borga. At the Royal Rumble, Luger participated in the Royal Rumble match where he and Bret Hart were declared co-winners after both men went over the top rope and had their feet hit the ground simultaneously. As such, both received shots at the WWF World Heavyweight Championship at WrestleMania X. Luger was disqualified in his title match against Yokozuna, becoming the first man to win the Rumble but not win their title match, and later that night Hart won the title from Yokozuna. After WrestleMania X, Luger was to start another feud with Mr. Perfect, but Hennig was injured, so Luger instead feuded with Crush.

Luger then began feuding with his friend Tatanka due to a lack of trust between them, and a match between the two took place at SummerSlam. At the event, Tatanka defeated Luger and joined Ted DiBiase's Million Dollar Corporation. At Survivor Series, he was in a Survivor Series team "Guts & Glory" (himself, Mabel, Adam Bomb, and The Smoking Gunns) losing to the Corporate team of Tatanka, King Kong Bundy, Bam Bam Bigelow, and The Heavenly Bodies – with only King Kong Bundy and Bam Bam Bigelow surviving.

==== Allied Powers (1995) ====
In the beginning of 1995, Luger took part in Royal Rumble 1995 main event. He eliminated Mabel, Bob Backlund, Mantaur, and Henry Godwinn and became one of the final four remaining participants in the contest. However, he was pushed out of the ring by Shawn Michaels from behind while attacking Crush.

Luger then formed a tag team with British Bulldog dubbed the Allied Powers. They made their pay-per-view debut as a tag team at WrestleMania XI, defeating the Blu Brothers. They defeated jobbers on Raw and, after a victory over Men on a Mission (King Mabel and Sir Mo) in June 1995, earned a shot at the WWF Tag Team Championship against Owen Hart and Yokozuna at In Your House 2: The Lumberjacks, but failed to win the titles. In August 1995 the started to decline. They lost a match to Men on a Mission on August 11. The following night, on a Madison Square Garden house show, Smith grabbed the mic and asked fans to tone down their "U.S.A." chant out of consideration to him, but they refused and kept on doing the chant. Smith deserted Luger by walking away during the scheduled match against the Blu Brothers.[3] Smith also walked out on Luger during several matches against Owen Hart and Yokozuna. Originally, there was going to be a feud with Luger vs Smith in a series of Flag Matches.

Shortly after SummerSlam, Luger, whose contract had expired, left the WWF without letting McMahon know beforehand. Luger's last official WWF match was on September 3 in Saint John, New Brunswick, at a house show teaming with Shawn Michaels defeating Owen Hart and Yokozuna by disqualification.

=== Return to WCW (1995–2001) ===
==== Dungeon of Doom; Alliance to End Hulkamania (1995–1996) ====
In late August 1995, after expressing to Sting that he wanted to leave the WWF, Luger got a call from WCW Vice-president Eric Bischoff to set up a meeting about a contract and Luger possibly "jumping ship". Bischoff was initially reluctant to make the offer, as he did not care for Luger personally or professionally, but relented due to both Sting's urging, and the idea that his appearance would make a big splash. Bischoff offered Luger only $150,000 a year, 20% of what he was making when he left WCW three years earlier, in a deliberate attempt to have him turn down the offer (and, according to Bischoff, "at least tell Sting that I tried"), only to be surprised to see that Luger accepted the offer. Luger himself would later state that he had planned on re-signing with the WWF on a two to three-year extension but saw a return to WCW as an opportunity to prove doubters wrong about his ability to be a top star.

Eight days after his appearance at SummerSlam and only one night after competing at a WWF house show in Saint John, New Brunswick, Luger made his return to WCW on the premiere of Nitro, coming out during the match for the United States Heavyweight Championship between champion Sting and Ric Flair. After Luger's return, he did not make his allegiances known acting as a tweener, except for that he still did have a long-time friendship with Sting. He merely claimed that he wanted to stake his claim at Hogan's WCW World Heavyweight Title, facing him on the September 11, 1995, episode of Nitro, which Hogan won by disqualification. At Halloween Havoc, Luger attacked Hogan after his match with The Giant and joined Kevin Sullivan's Dungeon of Doom stable.

At Starrcade, Luger participated in a WCW vs NJPW World Cup of Wrestling where he represented WCW in a winning effort against NJPW representative Masa Chono. Later that night, he participated in a triangle match with Sting and Ric Flair, with the winner to face Randy Savage for the WCW World Championship; Flair won after both Sting and Luger were counted out. The two men teamed up to defeat Harlem Heat for their first World Tag Team Championship on the January 22, 1996, episode of Nitro, with Luger constantly threatening dissent due to his allegiance to the Dungeon of Doom, but always seeming to stay on the same path as his friend. He lost to Eddie Guerrero by disqualification on the February 3 episode of Saturday Night. Luger also defeated Johnny B. Badd for the WCW World Television Championship on February 17, losing it back to him the next night. He regained the television title from Badd by beating him on March 6.

The Dungeon of Doom aligned with the Four Horsemen to form the Alliance to End Hulkamania, which feuded with Hulk Hogan and Luger's former WWF ally, Randy Savage. At Uncensored, nine members from the Alliance participated in a "Tower of Doom Steel Cage match", but were unsuccessful in defeating the team of Hogan and Savage. Luger was blamed for the loss because he accidentally punched teammate Ric Flair and was kicked out of the stable.

==== Feud with the New World Order (1996–1999) ====
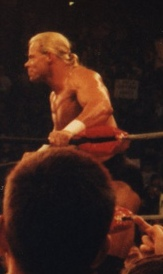
Luger in the ring during a taping of Nitro in 1998

During the summer, Luger began a feud with The Giant for the WCW World Heavyweight Championship, unsuccessfully challenging him at The Great American Bash. During this time, Scott Hall and Kevin Nash, both former WWF superstars, began appearing on WCW television and claimed they were "taking over" the company. Randy Savage spearheaded the WCW wrestlers against them, with Luger and Sting by his side. Luger, along with Savage and Sting, took on Nash and Hall (who called themselves The Outsiders) and a third, mystery, partner that they claimed was an "insider" at Bash at the Beach. In the first few minutes of the match, Luger went down to a kayfabe injury, leaving Sting and Savage on their own when the mystery partner revealed himself to be Hulk Hogan. With Luger no longer around, Savage and Sting were "easy prey" for the three who announced themselves as the New World Order (nWo).

Luger continued to be one of the leaders for the WCW's siege against the nWo, wrestling and feuding with a number of their members. At SuperBrawl VII, Luger and The Giant defeated the Outsiders to win the World Tag Team Championship. The title was returned to the Outsiders by nWo member and WCW President Eric Bischoff. Luger won a Four Corners match to become the No.1 contender for Hogan's WCW Title at Spring Stampede, and teamed with his new ally, The Giant, to defeat Hogan and basketball star Dennis Rodman at Bash at the Beach. On the August 4, 1997, episode of Nitro, Luger defeated Hogan to win his second World Heavyweight Championship in an impromptu match, before dropping the title back to Hogan just five days later at Road Wild. His victory, however, marked the first time in a year that WCW had "won their world title back" from the nWo.

Luger began a program with Hall after both men pinned each other in tag team matches (Luger's partner was Diamond Dallas Page and Hall's partner was Randy Savage) before facing each other in a 1-on-1 match at Halloween Havoc which Luger won. He had a short feud with Buff Bagwell in the fall of 1997, culminating in a match at Starrcade, which Bagwell won. In the first half of 1998, Luger feuded with Savage and defeated him at Souled Out and SuperBrawl VIII. His final feud with the nWo was against Scott Steiner, whom Luger defeated at Uncensored. At Spring Stampede, he teamed with Scott's brother and former tag team partner Rick to defeat Scott and Bagwell.

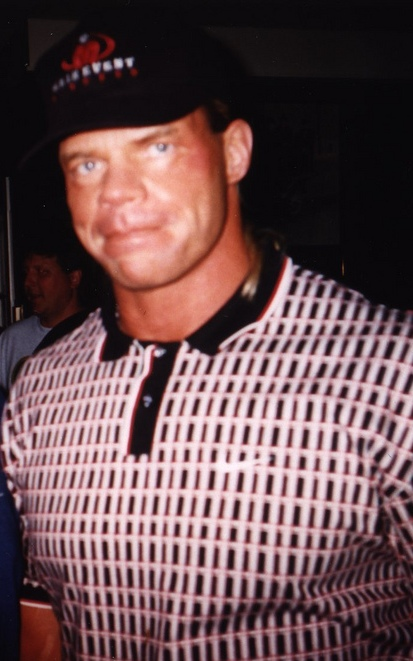
Luger in 1998 after taping Nitro

After a long war with the nWo, Luger joined nWo Wolfpac on May 25, 1998. Luger played a central role in the group's war with Hogan's nWo Hollywood, and even convinced the long-standing anti-nWo Sting to join. On the August 10, 1998, episode of Nitro, he defeated Bret Hart to win his record-tying fifth, and final, United States Heavyweight Championship in an impromptu title match, before dropping the title back to Hart just one day later on Thunder. He also took part in the incident in which both nWo factions united against the dominant Bill Goldberg in early 1999. He remained a member of the new nWo until he was sidelined with a (legitimate) biceps injury.

==== The Total Package and Totally Buff (1999–2001) ====
In August 1999, Luger returned to Nitro during a Sting/Hogan angle for the World Heavyweight Championship. He eventually helped Sting win the World Title at Fall Brawl in September 1999. After Fall Brawl, Luger claimed that Lex Luger was now "dead" and he was going by the name "The Total Package". He debuted this gimmick on the September 27, 1999 episode of Nitro with a Terminator-style entrance symbolizing his "rebirth" and by bringing back Miss Elizabeth as his manager. On the November 1, 1999, Nitro, a fallout between Sting and Luger began when Luger expressed a desire for them to win the WCW tag team titles, against Sting's desire to continue pursuing the WCW World title, only for Luger- who was also pursuing the WCW World Heavyweight Championship in same tournament Sting was in- to fake a knee injury and refuse to help Sting after Sting was attacked following a match the two had for the WCW Tag Team titles against Billy Kidman and Konnan. Luger would then attack Sting the following week in a match he had with Goldberg, which led to Sting attacking Luger in Luger's match with Sid Vicious. Sting would then defeat Luger in a quarterfinal match on the November 15, 1999 episode of Nitro. At the November WCW Mayhem event, the fallout with Sting was completed when Luger attacked Sting during his match with Bret Hart. The two would then feud. In addition, Luger also began treating Elizabeth badly, which prompted Sting to intervene. However, at Starrcade in December 1999, Sting and The Total Package had a match which saw Elizabeth turn on Sting and make clear her allegiance to the Total Package.

Luger continued his Total Package angle with Elizabeth through January 2000. He began a storyline where he would break the arms of his opponents by placing the arm inside a closed steel chair and stomping on it. In February 2000, he formed an alliance with Ric Flair to take out Hulk Hogan. They later formed a tag team under the name Team Package. The team feuded with Sting and Hogan until April 2000 when Vince Russo formed the New Blood causing Luger to join the Millionaires Club. He faced Booker T on the November 20, 2000, episode of Nitro for the WCW World Heavyweight Championship and Goldberg at Mayhem and again at Starrcade 2000 with Goldberg's career on the line. He also formed a tag team with Buff Bagwell named "Totally Buff". They defeated Goldberg and DeWayne Bruce in a tag team match at Sin in January 2001. Luger stayed with the team until the WWF purchased WCW in March 2001. After WCW closed down, Bagwell went to the WWF although the company was not interested in Luger. He took a hiatus from wrestling.

=== World Wrestling All-Stars (2002) ===
In November 2002, Luger returned to wrestling for the first time since the closure of WCW. He joined the European tour of World Wrestling All-Stars and debuted in Dublin, Ireland, teaming with Sting to defeat Buff Bagwell and Malice. At Retribution, Luger defeated Sting to win the vacant WWA World Heavyweight Championship after Jeff Jarrett interfered on his behalf. In Manchester, England on December 7, Luger and Sting faced Bagwell and Jarrett in a match in which both Luger's WWA World Heavyweight Championship and Jarrett's NWA World Heavyweight Championship were on the line, though neither title changed hands, as Sting pinned Bagwell. Luger made his final appearance with WWA on December 13, in Zürich, Switzerland, when he lost the WWA World Heavyweight Championship to Sting in a three-way dance that also featured Malice.

=== Total Nonstop Action Wrestling (2003–2004, 2006, 2012) ===
In late 2003, Luger began working for Total Nonstop Action Wrestling (TNA); he teamed with TNA co-founder Jeff Jarrett on November 12 in a loss to A.J. Styles and Sting. He returned on February 25, 2004, putting AJ Styles through a table during a tables match against Abyss.

Luger returned to TNA in 2006, first appearing during the April 27 Impact! as the second of Sting's potential tag team partners for Sacrifice. Throughout September and October, he appeared on Impact! as one of the people (along with Buff Bagwell) helping Sting to "prepare" for his upcoming match against Jeff Jarrett at Bound for Glory.

On October 13, 2012, Luger inducted Sting to the TNA Hall of Fame at a ceremony held in Phoenix, Arizona, prior to the Bound for Glory pay-per-view.

=== Later career (2003–2007) ===
Throughout 2004 and 2005, Luger made sporadic appearances on the independent circuit. Luger's final match took place on August 26, 2006, in the main event of a United Wrestling Federation event in Oklahoma, in which Luger teamed with Buff Bagwell to defeat Jeff Jarrett and Scott Steiner. On September 22, 2007, Luger was inducted into the XWF (later Legend's Pro Wrestling)'s Hall of Fame.

=== Return to WWE (2011–present) ===
In 2011, Luger began working again with WWE on their Wellness Policy. In regards to this role he stated:

I actually work behind the scenes with them now again and with their wellness club. I counsel a lot of their athletes on nutrition, wellness, exercise, and taking care of their bodies. That's another thing that WWE is being very proactive now with the Wellness Department and really train these guys with health and nutrition and drug prevention. We're trying to prevent the young guys, this young generation of guys from going down the same path as we did back in the '80s and '90s.

On March 3, 2024, Luger was in attendance for Sting's retirement match at AEW's Revolution alongside Magnum T. A., Scotty Riggs, and Nikita Koloff, however he was not shown or acknowledged during the broadcast as he was under a Legends Contract with WWE.

Luger was inducted into the 2025 WWE Hall of Fame by Diamond Dallas Page.

== Other media ==
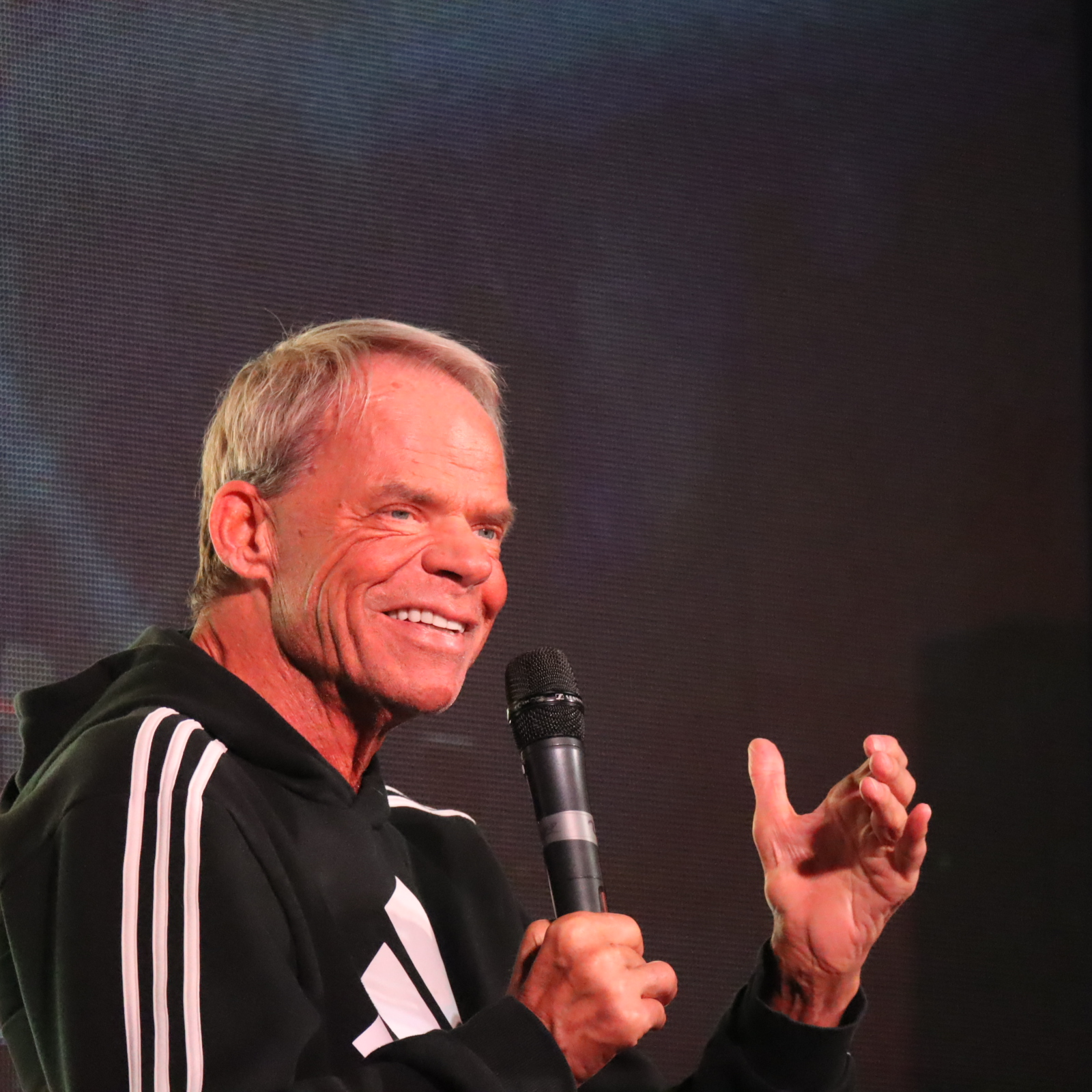
Luger during a speaking event in 2025

On September 28, 2006, Luger appeared on Praise the Lord, the flagship talk program of the Trinity Broadcasting Network and declared himself a born-again Christian. In an interview conducted by guest host, one-time wrestling tag-team partner, and longtime friend Sting, Luger emotionally discussed the downward turn of his career and personal life—including the events surrounding Miss Elizabeth's death—and how it led to his Christian conversion. Luger credits Steve Baskin, the pastor of Western Hills Baptist Church in Kennesaw, Georgia, with pulling him from a terminal tailspin. The jail chaplain met Luger in early 2006.

In 1990, Luger was a featured guest-star in Season 3 of the Superboy series in the episode "Mindscape". In 1999, he made a guest appearance on Arliss in the episode "To Thine Own Self Be True."

On November 20, 2012, Luger appeared on season 6, episode 15 of Hardcore Pawn, selling his ring robe for $3500 to Les Gold with the cash going to a charity. The Robe was later purchased by super fan Dave "Super Dave" Plaza.

On August 13, 2013, Luger's memoir Wrestling with the Devil: The True Story of a World Champion Professional Wrestler – His Reign, Ruin, and Redemption, was released with the foreword written by Sting. In 2016, Luger voiced himself in an episode of Camp WWE.

On August 7, 2022, Luger was the subject of an episode of Biography: WWE Legends.

== Personal life ==
Luger is divorced from Peggy and has two children. He remarried in 2025.

Luger is a reformed Christian. Luger is a fan of Scottish football club Rangers F.C and also English football club Manchester United F.C..

In 1989, Luger and fellow professional wrestler Steve Borden opened their own gym called Main Event Fitness in Atlanta, Georgia.

=== Health ===
On October 19, 2007, Luger suffered a nerve impingement in his neck that led to temporary paralysis. By 2014, Luger was using a wheelchair on a regular basis. By February 2025, Luger was able to stand up from his wheelchair on his own after working with longtime friend Dallas Page using DDP Yoga. On April 18, of that year Luger was able to walk to the podium during his WWE Hall of Fame induction.

=== Legal issues ===
On April 19, 2003, Luger was involved in a domestic dispute with Miss Elizabeth (Elizabeth Hulette), then his live-in girlfriend, in the garage of their townhouse in Marietta, Georgia, during which Luger allegedly struck her. Cobb County police found Hulette with two bruised eyes, a bump on her head, and a cut lip. Luger was charged with a misdemeanor count of battery and released on $2,500 bond. Two days later on April 21, Luger was arrested for driving under the influence after rear-ending another car. According to the police report, Luger had slurred speech and bloodshot eyes, and could not locate his driver's license. Hulette was a passenger in the vehicle and was sent home in a taxi. Luger was also driving with a suspended license for not appearing in court on March 5, 2003, for a hearing on a previous offense of driving with expired tags and having no proof of insurance.

On May 1, 2003, Hulette died in the Marietta townhouse she shared with Luger after mixing pills of hydrocodone and Alprazolam (Xanax) with vodka. Luger was arrested after a search of the residence revealed a number of illicit controlled substances, including anabolic steroids, oxycodone, synthetic growth hormone, testosterone, and alprazolam. He was charged with 14 felony counts of drug possession. He was released the following day on $27,500 bail. Hulette's death was eventually ruled accidental. Luger plead guilty to the charges and was fined $1,000, sentenced to five years probation, and ordered to undergo periodic drug tests.

In December 2005, Luger and fellow wrestlers Scott Steiner and Buff Bagwell were removed from a flight to Winnipeg, Manitoba, after committing acts of disturbance on board the plane, and were detained for several hours. Although Steiner and Bagwell were freed to resume their trip, Luger was charged with violating his probation by failing to obtain permission to leave the country. Luger was initially detained in the Hennepin County jail. He was tried in Georgia and sentenced to four months in Cobb County Jail, with a one-month credit for time served.

== Video games ==
WCW video games
Year	Title	Notes
1990	WCW Wrestling	Video game debut
1997	WCW vs. the World	
1997	WCW vs. nWo: World Tour	
1998	WCW Nitro	
1998	WCW/nWo Revenge	
1999	WCW/nWo Thunder	
1999	WCW Mayhem	
2000	WCW Backstage Assault	

WWE video games
Year	Title	Notes
1993	WWF Royal Rumble	Video game debut
1993	WWF King of the Ring	Cover athlete
1993	WWF Rage in the Cage	Cover athlete
1994	WWF Raw	Cover athlete
1995	WWF WrestleMania: The Arcade Game	
2010	WWE SmackDown vs. Raw 2011	Downloadable content
2014	WWE SuperCard	
2014	WWE 2K15	Downloadable content
2015	WWE 2K16	
2016	WWE 2K17	
2017	WWE Champions	
2017	WWE 2K18	
2017	WWE Mayhem	
2018	WWE 2K19	
2024	WWE 2K24	Downloadable content
2025	WWE 2K25	
2026	WWE 2K26	

== Championships and accomplishments ==
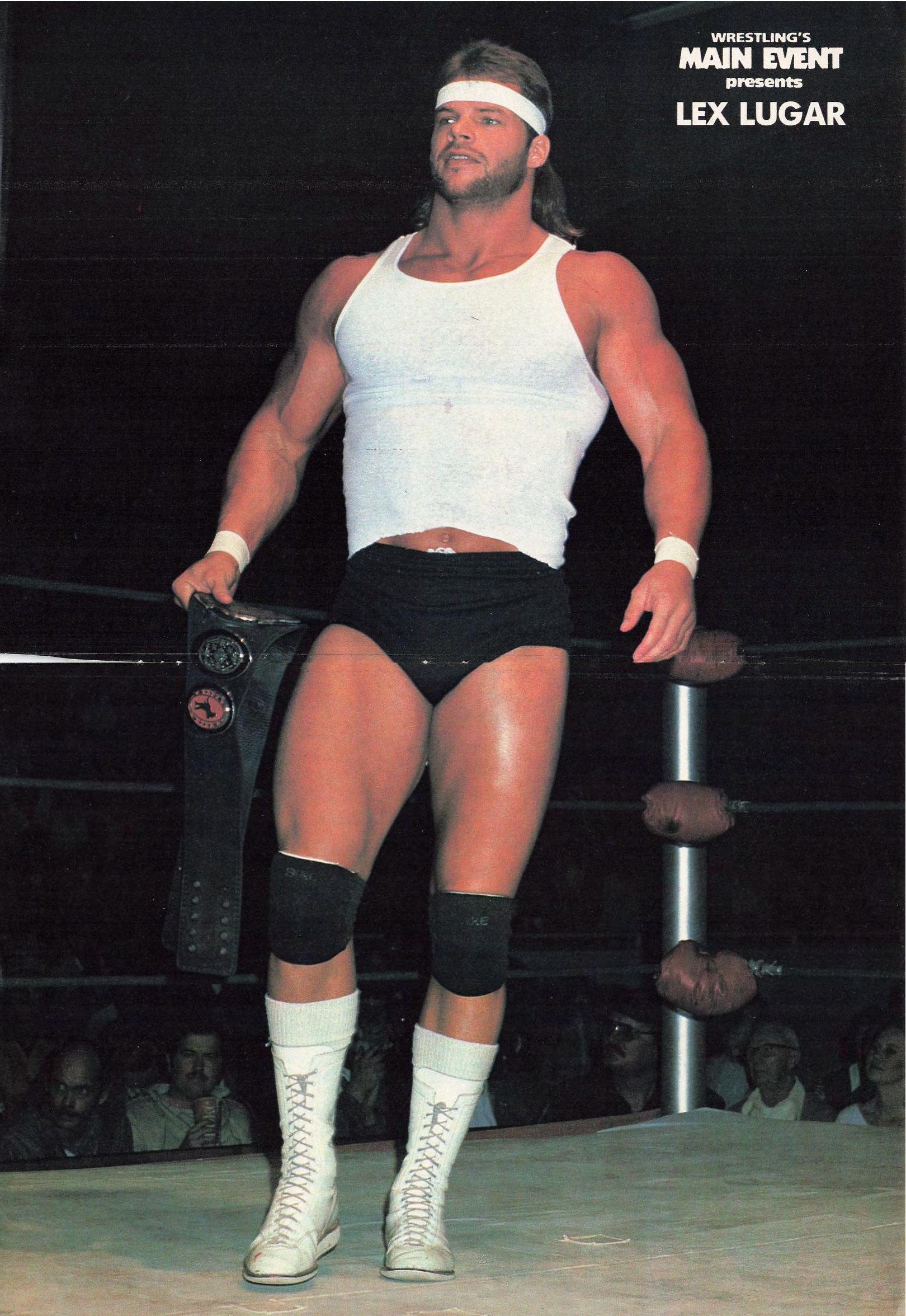
Luger as the NWA Southern Heavyweight Champion, c. 1986

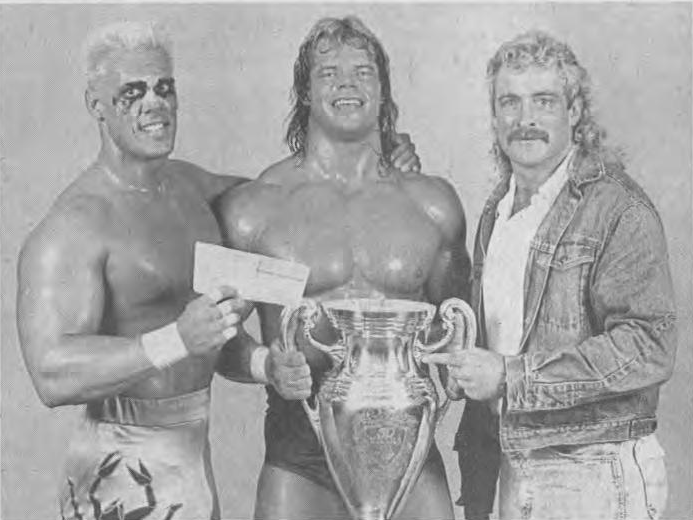
Luger (center) upon winning the Jim Crockett Sr. Memorial Cup in 1988

- Championship Wrestling from Florida
  - NWA Bahamas Championship (1 time)
  - NWA Florida Television Championship (1 time)
  - NWA Southern Heavyweight Championship (Florida version) (3 times)
- George Tragos/Lou Thesz Professional Wrestling Hall of Fame
  - Frank Gotch Award (2016)
- National Wrestling Alliance (NWA)/World Championship Wrestling (WCW)
  - WCW World Heavyweight Championship (2 times)
  - WCW World Television Championship (2 times)
  - NWA/WCW United States Heavyweight Championship (5 times)
  - NWA/WCW World Tag Team Championship (3 times) – with Barry Windham (1), Sting (1), and The Giant (1)
  - Jim Crockett Sr. Memorial Cup (1988) – with Sting
  - Second WCW Triple Crown Champion
  - World Cup Of Wrestling (1995) – with Sting, Randy Savage, Alex Wright, Johnny B. Badd, Eddie Guerrero, and Chris Benoit
- Pro Wrestling Illustrated
  - Comeback of the Year (1993)
  - Feud of the Year (1987) The Four Horsemen vs. The Super Powers and The Road Warriors
  - Feud of the Year (1988, 1990) vs. Ric Flair
  - Match of the Year (1991) with Sting vs. The Steiner Brothers at SuperBrawl I
  - Most Popular Wrestler of the Year (1993)
  - Rookie of the Year (1986)
  - Wrestler of the Year (1997)
  - Ranked No. 2 of the top 500 singles wrestlers in the PWI 500 in 1991
  - Ranked No. 20 of the top 500 singles wrestlers of the PWI Years in 2003
  - Ranked No. 52 and No. 90 of the top 100 tag teams of the PWI Years with Sting and Barry Windham, respectively, in 2003
- World Wrestling All-Stars
  - WWA World Heavyweight Championship (1 time)
- World Wrestling Federation/WWE
  - Royal Rumble (1994) with Bret Hart (Note: Luger and Bret Hart are recognized as co-winners after both simultaneously eliminated each other.)
  - WWE Hall of Fame (Class of 2025)
  - Slammy Award (1 time)
    - Most Patriotic (1994)
- Wrestling Observer Newsletter
  - Most Improved (1989)
  - Worst Worked Match of the Year (1996) with Arn Anderson, Meng, The Barbarian, Ric Flair, Kevin Sullivan, Z-Gangsta, and The Ultimate Solution vs. Hulk Hogan and Randy Savage in a Towers of Doom match at Uncensored on March 24

== See also ==
- List of gridiron football players who became professional wrestlers
