= Owen Hart and Yokozuna =

Tag team
- Members: Owen Hart; Yokozuna; The British Bulldog (for one night)
- Name: Owen Hart and Yokozuna, Camp Cornette
- Billed heights: Owen: 5 ft 11 in (1.80 m); Yokozuna: 6 ft 4 in (1.93 m)
- Combined billed weight: 827 lb (375 kg)
- Hometown: Owen: Calgary, Alberta; Yokozuna: San Francisco, California
- Debut: April 2, 1995
- Disbanded: September 25, 1995; March 31, 1996 into Camp Cornette
- Years active: 1995

Owen Hart and Yokozuna were a professional wrestling tag team who wrestled in World Wrestling Federation.

== History ==
The team debuted on WrestleMania XI when former WWF Champion Yokozuna was billed as Hart's mystery partner. This was Yokozuna's first appearance since 1994 Survivor Series. They defeated The Smoking Gunns to win the WWF Tag Team Championship.

During their World Tag Team Championship reign, Owen Hart and Yokozuna rose to the top of the tag team division of WWF as they went on to make successful title defenses against the likes of The Smoking Gunns and The Allied Powers. The win over the Allied Powers at In Your House 2 PPV event was considered a major upset in fan's eyes at the time. During the next In Your House ppv event two months later, the World Tag Team Championship title defense was included, but Hart was replaced by The British Bulldog because Hart was with his wife who was giving birth to their second child. Yokozuna and Bulldog defended the titles against Diesel and Shawn Michaels, but lost to Diesel and Michaels when Diesel pinned Hart after a jacknife powerbomb who came to ringside late in the match.

They went on to hold the title for 175 days during their first reign. Hart and Yokozuna were awarded the titles back the next day by their lawyer Clarence Mason because, while Hart was pinned in the match, he was not a legal part of the match therefore Michaels and Diesel could not be champions. The same night, Hart and Yokozuna went on to lose the titles to The Smoking Gunns. After the match, their tag team disbanded as Yokozuna focused on singles career while Hart formed a tag team with The British Bulldog in 1996. Both Owen and Bulldog feuded with Yokozuna in early 1996.

== Championships and accomplishments ==
- World Wrestling Federation
  - WWF Tag Team Championship (2 times)
