= Yokozuna (wrestler) =

American professional wrestler (1966–2000)

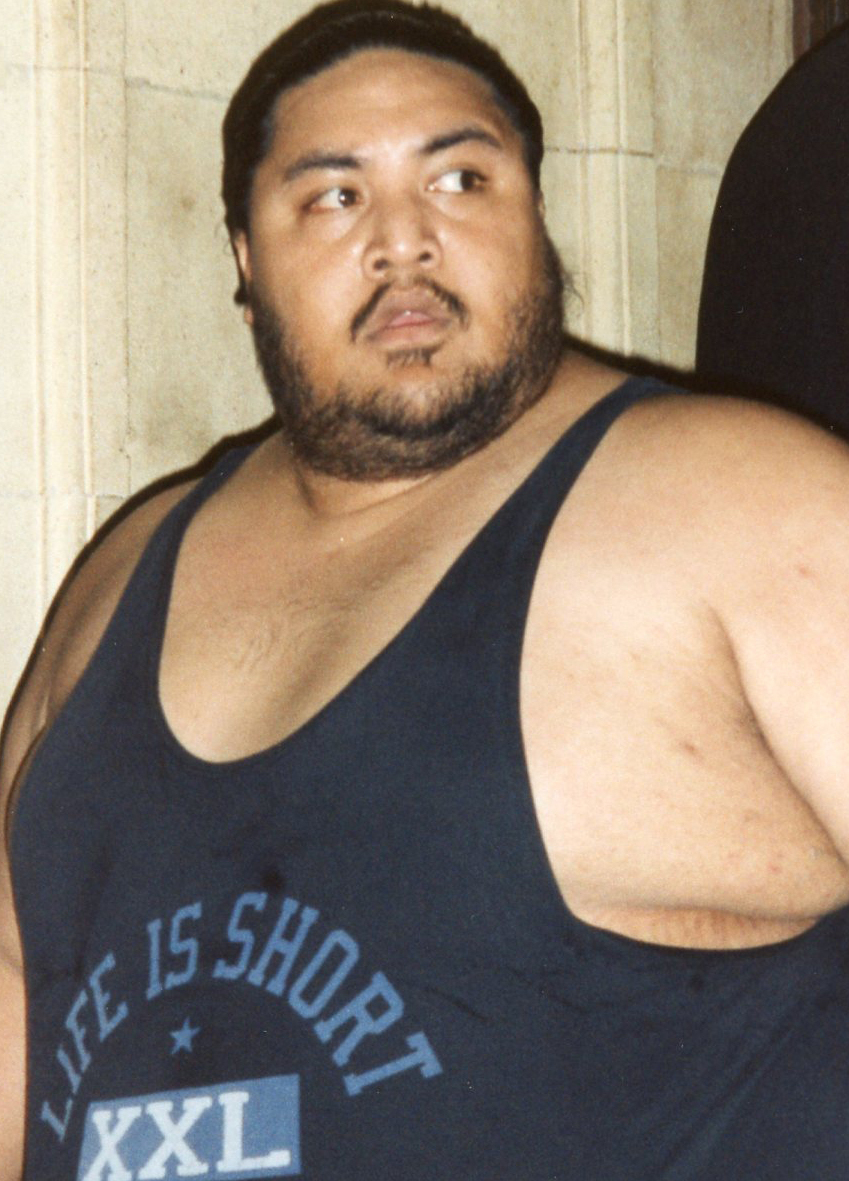
- Anoa'i in 1995

Personal information
- Born: Rodney Agatupu Anoa'i; October 2, 1966 San Francisco, California, U.S.
- Died: October 23, 2000 (aged 34) Liverpool, England
- Cause of death: Pulmonary edema
- Children: 2
- Family: Anoaʻi

Professional wrestling career
- Ring names: Giant Kokina; Great Kokina; Kokina; Kokina Anoai; Kokina Maximus; Kokina the Samoan; Wild Samoan Kokina; Yokozuna
- Billed height: 6 ft 4 in (193 cm)
- Billed weight: 589 lb (267 kg)
- Billed from: Japan "The Land of the Rising Sun"; Polynesia
- Trained by: Afa Anoaʻi
- Debut: 1985

Rodney Agatupu Anoaʻi (October 2, 1966 – October 23, 2000) was an American professional wrestler. He was best known for his time with the World Wrestling Federation (WWF), where he wrestled under the ring name Yokozuna. He was also known for his appearances with New Japan Pro-Wrestling (NJPW) as Great Kokina.

Anoa'i's character was portrayed as a champion sumo wrestler, with his ring name being a reference to the highest rank in professional sumo wrestling in Japan. While Anoaʻi wrestled as a representative of Japan, he was a Samoan American and was billed as hailing from Polynesia. However, he was managed by the Japanese character Mr. Fuji (in reality a Japanese American) who would follow Anoaʻi to the ring with a wooden bucket of salt while waving a Japanese flag.

In the WWF, Anoaʻi was a two-time WWF World Heavyweight Champion and two-time WWF Tag Team Champion (with Owen Hart), as well as the winner of the 1993 Royal Rumble. He was the first wrestler of Samoan descent to hold the WWF World Heavyweight Championship, as well as the first Royal Rumble winner who (as a result of a direct stipulation) received a WWF world championship title shot at WrestleMania. He defeated WWE Hall of Famers Bret Hart and Hulk Hogan at consecutive pay-per-views in the main events of WrestleMania IX and the 1993 King of the Ring, to win his two WWF Championships, also headlining WrestleMania X against Hart. He was the third-fastest newcomer (after Brock Lesnar and Sheamus) to win the WWF Championship after his debut. He was posthumously inducted into the WWE Hall of Fame in 2012.

== Professional wrestling career ==
=== Early career (1985–1988) ===
Anoaʻi grew up in a family of wrestlers, the Anoaʻi family; his uncles, the Wild Samoans (Afa Anoaʻi and Sika Anoaʻi) trained him from an early age. He debuted in 1985. He spent the early years of his career performing for promotions such as International World Class Championship Wrestling, Texas All-Star Wrestling, the Universal Wrestling Federation, the Continental Wrestling Association, and the Continental Wrestling Federation under a variety of ring names, including "Giant Kokina", "Great Kokina", "Kokina", and "Kokina the Samoan". In December 1988, he wrestled for the Catch Wrestling Association (CWA) in Germany, unsuccessfully challenging Otto Wanz for the CWA World Heavyweight Championship.

=== New Japan Pro-Wrestling (1988–1992) ===
In August 1988, Anoaʻi began making appearances in Japan with New Japan Pro-Wrestling (NJPW) as "Great Kokina". In August and September 1988, he took part in the "Sengoku Series" tour, where he faced opponents such as Super Strong Machine and Tatsutoshi Goto, and teamed with fellow gaijin including Crusher Bam Bam Bigelow and Scott Hall.

Anoaʻi made his next appearances with NJPW in June and July 1989 as part of its "Summer Fight Series". During this tour, he repeatedly teamed with Big Van Vader and Mike Kirchner, with his opponents including Kengo Kimura, Masa Saito, and Riki Choshu. In October and November that year, Anoaʻi made a third tour of Japan as part of NJPW's "Toukon Series"; during this stint, he again repeatedly teamed with Big Van Vader, while his opponents included Choshu, Kimura, Masahiro Chono, and Osamu Kido.

Anoaʻi wrestled a fourth stint with NJPW in January and February 1990 as part of its "New Spring Gold Series". During this tour he once again teamed with Big Van Vader, as well as teaming with his future World Wrestling Federation tag team partner Owen Hart. On the final day of his tour, he and Vader unsuccessfully challenged Masa Saito and Shinya Hashimoto for the IWGP Tag Team Championship. He returned to NJPW for one week in July 1990 during the "Wrestling Scramble", teaming with Wild Samoan as the Samoan SWAT Team and unsuccessfully challenging Keiji Muto and Masahiro Chono for the IWGP Tag Team Championship. He had a short sixth stint with NJPW in September 1990 during the "Explosion Tour", once again teaming with Wild Samoan.

Anoaʻi returned to NJPW for a seventh stint in April 1991 during that year's "Explosion Tour". This stint saw the Samoan SWAT Team primarily wrestle six-man tag team matches, teaming with Scott Norton or Pegasus Kid. He made a sixth stint with NJPW in July 1991 as part of the "Summer Crush" tour and a seventh stint in September 1991 as part of the "Battle Autumn" tour, again teaming with Wild Samoan. At the end of the Battle Autumn tour, Anoaʻi took part in the "Memorial Battle in Yokohama" event at the Yokohama Arena, teaming with Wild Samoan, Pegasus Kid, and Brad Armstrong to defeat Black Cat, Kengo Kimura, Osamu Kido, and Shiro Koshinaka. In October 1991, Anoaʻi and Great Kokina took part in the Super Grade Tag League; they defeated Kim Duk and Tiger Jeet Singh, but lost their other five matches, ultimately placing in joint last place with two points.

Anoaʻi made a ninth stint with NJPW in March 1992 as part of the "Big Fight Series", once again teaming with Wild Samoan as the Samoan SWAT Team; the main event of the final day of the series saw the Samoan SWAT Team and Big Van Vader lose to Keiji Muto, Masahiro Chono, and Riki Choshu in the Korakuen Hall in Tokyo. In June and July 1992, the Samoan SWAT Team wrestled on the "Masters of Wrestling" tour. Anoaʻi made his final appearances with NJPW in September 1992 as part of its "Battle Autumn" tour. His last match took place at the "Battle Hold Arena" event at the Yokohama Arena, where the Samoan SWAT Team lost to Raging Staff (Super Strong Machine and Tatsutoshi Goto).

=== American Wrestling Association (1989–1990) ===
In 1989, Anoa'i received his first major exposure in the United States when he joined the American Wrestling Association (AWA) as "Kokina Maximus". Managed by Sheik Adnan El Kassey, he depicted a disheveled Samoan wild man, and was billed as the biggest Samoan wrestler ever. In late-1989, an angle was booked in which he repeatedly delivered a big splash to Greg Gagne, marking the end of Gagne's career. Anoaʻi made his final appearance with the AWA in April 1990, losing to Yukon John Nord in a lumberjack match at SuperClash IV.

=== Universal Wrestling Association (1990–1992) ===
In February 1990, Anoaʻi began wrestling for the Universal Wrestling Association (UWA) in Mexico as "Great Kokina". He initially wrestled primarily in two-out-of-three falls matches. In March 1991, he unsuccessfully challenged El Canek for the UWA World Heavyweight Championship. In April 1991, Anoaʻi and his cousins Fatu and Samoan Savage (with the trio collectively billed as the "Hawaiian Beasts") defeated Los Villanos for the UWA World Trios Championship. Los Villanos regained the titles in a rematch the following month. For the remainder of his tenure in the UWA, Anoaʻi continued to wrestle primarily in two-out-of-three falls matches (including teaming with Black Scorpio and Buffalo Allen in a loss to André the Giant, El Canek, and Villano III in May 1992), as well as again unsuccessfully challenging El Canek for the UWA World Heavyweight Championship on several other occasions. He made his final appearances with the promotion in August 1992.

=== World Wrestling Federation (1992–1998) ===
==== WWF Champion (1992–1994) ====
In 1992, Anoaʻi was contacted by Vince McMahon of the World Wrestling Federation (WWF) and offered a roster spot along with The Samoans (Fatu and Samoan Savage). On the August 17 episode of Prime Time Wrestling, the Samoans (soon to be the Headshrinkers) made their debut. Commentator Gorilla Monsoon made mention of another, larger Samoan that they would soon be seeing in the WWF. Anoaʻi made his initial debut as Kokina in an untelevised match on September 1, at a WWF Superstars taping in Hershey, Pennsylvania, defeating Ron Neal. This would be the only time that Anoaʻi wrestled under his former gimmick, as shortly after, he was offered a new gimmick: Yokozuna.

Managed by Mr. Fuji, Yokozuna debuted on the October 31, 1992 edition of Superstars with his then new gimmick of a stereotypical sumo wrestler, who competed under the Japanese flag; though the WWF tactfully acknowledged his Samoan roots. That night he defeated Bill Jordan in Saskatoon, Saskatchewan. He wore a mawashi as part of his ring attire, but wore long tights underneath the loincloth, something that Vince McMahon and Yokozuna's cousin Rikishi later felt wasn't needed and that he should've worn the traditional mawashi without the tights to expose his buttocks (which Rikishi himself would later do). Anoaʻi also revamped his appearance as Yokozuna by gaining additional weight, becoming clean shaven and transforming his unruly hair into a chonmage. He made his pay-per-view debut on November 25 at Survivor Series, easily defeating the much smaller Virgil with his huge weight advantage. Yokozuna's career soon took off and he was billed as a potential favorite to win the Royal Rumble match on January 24, 1993, doing so by last eliminating Randy Savage. Having cemented his movement towards main-event status, Yokozuna was a competitor in the first-ever match in Monday Night Raw history, defeating the much smaller Koko B. Ware with his signature finisher, the Banzai Drop. Soon after, Yokozuna was challenged by American patriot "Hacksaw" Jim Duggan, who aimed to be the first man to knock Yokozuna off his feet (this was taped before Randy Savage knocked down Yokozuna at the Royal Rumble). On the February 6 airing of Superstars, Duggan succeeded in knocking Yokozuna down, only for Yokozuna to sneak attack Duggan with a bucket of salt Mr. Fuji had brought to the ring, and crush him with four Banzai Drops, the fourth being with the American flag draped over Duggan. Afterwards, Duggan was suffering from (kayfabe) internal bleeding. On the May 10, 1993, edition of Monday Night Raw, Yokozuna served as one of the lumberjacks in a match between Duggan and Shawn Michaels for the Intercontinental Championship. Duggan, upon seeing Yokozuna, immediately charged at him and knocked him off his feet again; late in the match, after Bam Bam Bigelow distracted Duggan, Michaels attacked the challenger from behind and threw him out of the ring to where Yokozuna was standing. Yokozuna knocked Duggan to the floor and nailed him with a leg drop, then rolled his unconscious body back into the ring as payback for the earlier attack.

At WrestleMania IX on April 4, Yokozuna wrestled against Bret Hart for the WWF Championship. Hart had the match won with Yokozuna about to submit to the Sharpshooter, when Mr. Fuji threw salt into the champion's face. Blinded, Hart was then pinned by Yokozuna, who won the WWF Championship. As he and Mr. Fuji celebrated, Hulk Hogan came to the ring to help Hart and was challenged by Mr. Fuji to take on the new champion. After Fuji accidentally threw salt in Yokozuna's eyes, Hogan came through with the win and captured his fifth WWF Championship. At the time, Yokozuna held the record for the second shortest time (after Ric Flair) to win the WWF Championship after his debut, with 173 days (currently, Yokozuna holds the fourth shortest time, after Flair, Sheamus, and Brock Lesnar). On June 13 at King of the Ring, Yokozuna, whose weight increased from 505 lb (229 kg) to 550 lb (250 kg), challenged Hogan for the title. Hogan seemed to have the match won, but a photographer, planted at ringside among a legitimate Japanese wrestling press group, shot a blast of fire into Hogan's face. This allowed Yokozuna to take Hogan out with a leg drop and regain the WWF Championship, after which he proceeded to hit Hogan with the Banzai Drop in the corner. Hogan then left the WWF to pursue other interests, leaving Yokozuna and Fuji to claim that they had ended "Hulkamania". To celebrate, he held a "Bodyslam Competition" aboard the USS Intrepid, a decommissioned aircraft carrier, on Independence Day. Many wrestlers and athletes failed to slam Yokozuna until Lex Luger flew in by helicopter, stepped forward, and slammed him on the deck. Commentator Bobby Heenan claimed Luger's move was a hiptoss, not a bodyslam, as Yokozuna was running at Luger, but the slam was ruled legitimate. This made Luger the next major challenger to Yokozuna's title.

On August 30 at SummerSlam, Yokozuna, now weighing 568 lb (258 kg), and Luger fought for the WWF Championship. Luger took control late in the match, scoring on Yokozuna with a bodyslam and flying forearm. Luger had metal plates put into his arm following an injury from a motorcycle accident (it was stipulated that Luger had to wear a protective pad over it, but it was torn off in the course of the match). However, Yokozuna was knocked out of the ring unconscious and lost via count-out, though he retained the title because it could not change hands via count-out. The contract Luger had signed for the match, as orchestrated by Yokozuna's new spokesman and advisor James E. Cornette, stated that if he did not win the championship, he would not get another shot at the title. Yokozuna and Luger continued to feud until Survivor Series on November 24, where each chose a team of allies for an elimination match, which was billed as an All-Americans (Lex Luger, The Undertaker, and Steiner Brothers) vs. Foreign Fanatics (Yokozuna, Quebecer Jacques, Ludvig Borga, and Crush) contest. Yokozuna was eliminated via double count-out after brawling with the Undertaker outside of the ring; the All-Americans went on to win the match.

Yokozuna's next title challenger was The Undertaker, whom he was eventually forced to accept a casket match with. The match occurred on January 22, 1994, at Royal Rumble, which Yokozuna won by shoving the Undertaker in the casket with help from multiple heel wrestlers. After the match, a mysterious figure appeared on the titantron, looking like the Undertaker inside the casket. He opened his eyes and said the Undertaker would not rest in peace; he then disappeared in a smoke and light show, rising to the top of the titantron and seemingly levitating all the way to the arena ceiling until vanishing. This storyline was used to allow the Undertaker to rest for several months to recover from lingering real-life injuries.

In the Royal Rumble match, the last two competitors, Lex Luger and Bret Hart, fought and eliminated each other simultaneously. Since the winner of the Royal Rumble was to become the number one contender to Yokozuna's title, it was decided that both wrestlers would get a shot at the title at WrestleMania X. By virtue of winning a coin toss, Luger got to wrestle Yokozuna first at the event. The winner of that match would go on to face Bret Hart later in the evening with the title on the line. To obviate the risk of outside interference, both title matches were scheduled to have special guest referees, with Mr. Perfect as the referee for the Luger/Yokozuna bout. Luger had knocked out Yokozuna with a running forearm smash in the middle of the ring, as well as Mr. Fuji and Jim Cornette, but when he went for the pin, Perfect occupied himself with the unconscious Fuji and Cornette who were still lying on the ring apron. An angry Luger was disqualified after pushing Mr. Perfect, making Yokozuna the first villainous champion to successfully defend the WWF Championship at WrestleMania. Later in the night, Yokozuna defended the championship again, this time against Bret Hart, who had lost earlier in the night to his brother Owen Hart. For this match, Roddy Piper was the special referee, attacking Cornette when he tried to break a pinfall. At the end of the match, Yokozuna seemed ready to hit his finishing maneuver, the Banzai Drop, but lost his balance and took a fall from the ropes. Hart pinned Yokozuna to win the title, ending Yokozuna's reign at 280 days.

After dropping the belt, Yokozuna's main event status began to fade away. He briefly tagged with Crush, another Mr. Fuji charge. On the May 16 episode of Raw, Yokozuna lost to Earthquake in the only (worked) sumo match until WrestleMania 21, between The Big Show and an actual yokozuna, Akebono. At King of the Ring on June 19, Yokozuna and Crush failed to win the WWF Tag Team Championship from The Headshrinkers (Samu and Fatu). Yokozuna then had to deal with the "rebirth" of the Undertaker, who immediately came after the foe who had taken him out of action. The two met in another casket match on November 23 at Survivor Series, this time with actor/karate expert Chuck Norris as the special enforcer to keep the other heel wrestlers away from ringside. Without their help (although Irwin R. Schyster successfully interfered on Yokozuna's behalf), Yokozuna lost the match and ended up locked inside the casket. Yokozuna continued to wrestle briefly before taking some time off to increase his already huge weight advantage.

==== Teaming with Owen Hart; departure (1995–1998) ====
In April 1995, Owen Hart began promising that he would have a great tag team partner to face off against The Smoking Gunns (Billy and Bart) at WrestleMania XI for the WWF Tag Team Championship. At the event on April 2, Yokozuna, now weighing in at 641 lb (291 kg), was revealed as his partner, and the team defeated the Gunns to win the WWF Tag Team Championship. The two retained the titles against the Gunns in a rematch on May 14 at In Your House 1 and against the Allied Powers (Lex Luger and Davey Boy Smith) on July 23 at In Your House 2.

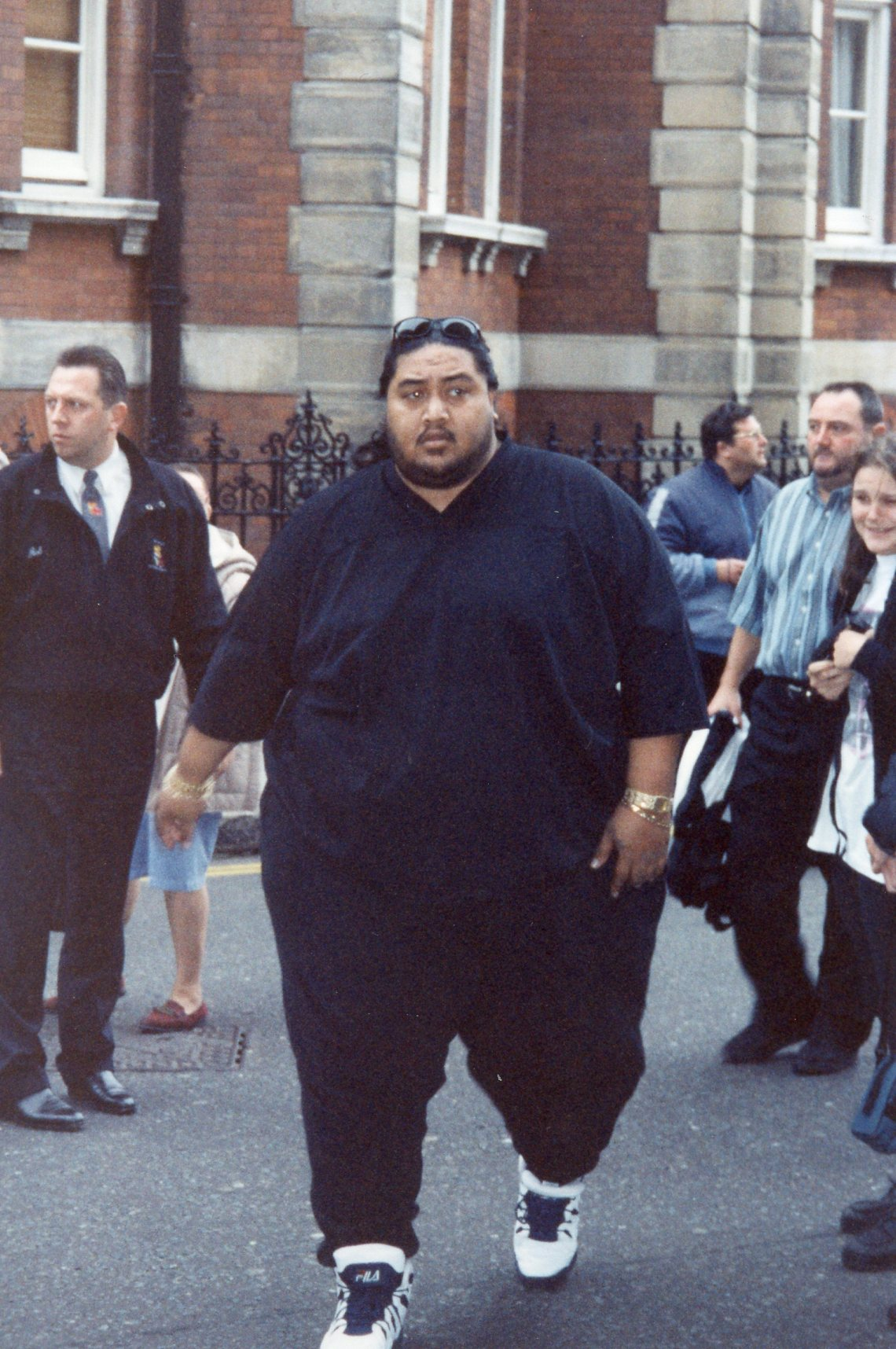
Yokozuna in England in October 1995

At In Your House 3 on September 24, Yokozuna and Davey Boy Smith took on Shawn Michaels and Diesel (the back story being that Hart was with his wife as she gave birth to one of their children) with Diesel's WWF Championship, Shawn Michaels' Intercontinental Championship and Hart and Yokozuna's Tag Team Championship on the line. During the match, Hart came to the ring, only to be pinned by Diesel. The next day, due to protests from the team and the legal help of Clarence Mason, President Gorilla Monsoon reluctantly returned the belts to Yokozuna and Hart, since Hart was not an official part of the match. Their second reign was shorter, as the Smoking Gunns defeated them that night for the belts.

Yokozuna, by now weighing in at 660 lb (300 kg), had little continued success in 1996. He competed in the Royal Rumble match on January 21, eliminating Bob Backlund, King Mabel, and Swat Team member #2 before being tossed out by eventual winner Shawn Michaels. Although Cornette tried to make peace between him and new acquisition Vader, many observers felt Yokozuna was being relegated. After several run-ins, Yokozuna left Cornette and began a short stint as a fan favorite. He spoke English to the fans, had Mr. Fuji wave an American flag during his matches, and challenged Vader to numerous matches. On March 31 at WrestleMania XII, Yokozuna, Ahmed Johnson and Jake Roberts lost to Vader, Owen Hart and British Bulldog. Vader jumped on Yokozuna's leg on the April 8 episode of Raw, (kayfabe) breaking it. The splash was shown on television as a leg break, but in reality, it was performed to allow Yokozuna to take some time off to lose weight. However, instead of a stretcher, a real forklift had to be brought to carry Yokozuna out, as it was the only way to move a man of his size.

In May, Yokozuna returned at In Your House 8: Beware of Dog to wrestle Vader. During the event, a severe thunderstorm in the area caused the pay-per-view broadcast feed to blackout. In one of the matches not broadcast, Yokozuna defeated Vader. The event was rescheduled two days later, in which the matches that were previously blacked-out took place again. Vader won their rematch. On August 18, he appeared at Free for All just before SummerSlam, where he lost to Stone Cold Steve Austin after he attempted a Banzai Drop on the rope, which broke under his weight, sending him crashing back down for Austin to win.

The next night on Raw, Yokozuna faced then WWF Champion Shawn Michaels for the title in a losing effort. Afterwards, he only made appearances on house shows. He made his final televised WWF appearance at the Survivor Series on November 17, still going after Vader, however he only briefly entered the match illegally and it ended with all remaining wrestlers being disqualified. His final match in the WWF was on November 20, 1996, at a house show in White Plains, New York in a battle royal won by his cousin Rocky Maivia.

For a second time, Yokozuna went to his home in Los Angeles to lose weight through exercise and dieting, being replaced by other wrestlers on a late November 1996 tour of the United Kingdom. Despite dropping a reported 100 lb (45 kg), he still could not lose enough to satisfy the WWF officials, and was not medically cleared to wrestle in some states because of his physical condition. Yokozuna was ultimately unable to pass a physical examination required for professional wrestlers by the New York State Athletic Commission, and was released from the WWF in May 1998.

=== Late career (1998–2000) ===
After his WWF career ended in 1998, he performed sporadically for various independent promotions, including Maryland Championship Wrestling. At the Heroes of Wrestling pay-per-view event on October 10, 1999, Yokozuna was scheduled to take on King Kong Bundy in one of the event's two featured matches. However, Jake Roberts, who was scheduled to face Jim Neidhart in the other main event match, came to the ring for his match intoxicated and in no condition to wrestle. The promoters made a last-minute change and Yokozuna teamed with Roberts against Bundy and Neidhart, and Yokozuna's team lost. He wrestled his final match on October 17, 2000 (six days prior to his death) for All Star Wrestling, teaming with Greg Valentine to defeat Spinner McKenzie and Drew McDonald in London in the United Kingdom.

== Filmography ==
Title	Year	Role	Notes
L'homme au masque d'or	1991	L'Hawaïen	Film
The Mirror Has Two Faces	1996	Sumo wrestler on TV	Film
Aar Ya Paar	1997	Yokozuna	Film

== Personal life ==
Anoaʻi was a member of the Anoaʻi wrestling family, with Roman Reigns, Rikishi, Samu, Rosey, Manu, Umaga, and The Rock among his cousins. The Usos and Solo Sikoa were his nephews and Afa and Sika were his uncles. He had two children, Justin and Keilani. He also suffered from arachnophobia, and claimed to devour 240 eggs, 12 pieces of chicken and a bucket-sized portion of Japanese rice every day.

== Death ==
On October 23, 2000, Anoaʻi died in his sleep from pulmonary edema in his seventh-floor room at the Moat House Hotel on Paradise Street in Liverpool while on a wrestling tour of the UK for All Star Wrestling. He was 34 years old. His body was found by his crew's transport manager, and after paramedics came into his hotel room, it took six men to move his body. At the time, it was widely reported that he died of heart failure or a heart attack, but this was later found to be incorrect due to his lungs showing severe signs of fluid blockage.

== Legacy ==
The Yokozuna Memorial Show was held in Allentown, Pennsylvania in November 2001, shortly after the first anniversary of Anoaʻi's death. It was presented by the independent promotion World Xtreme Wrestling, although matches included wrestlers from multiple promotions.

On March 31, 2012, Yokozuna was posthumously inducted into the WWE Hall of Fame by his nephews The Usos and cousin Rikishi.

== Championships and accomplishments ==
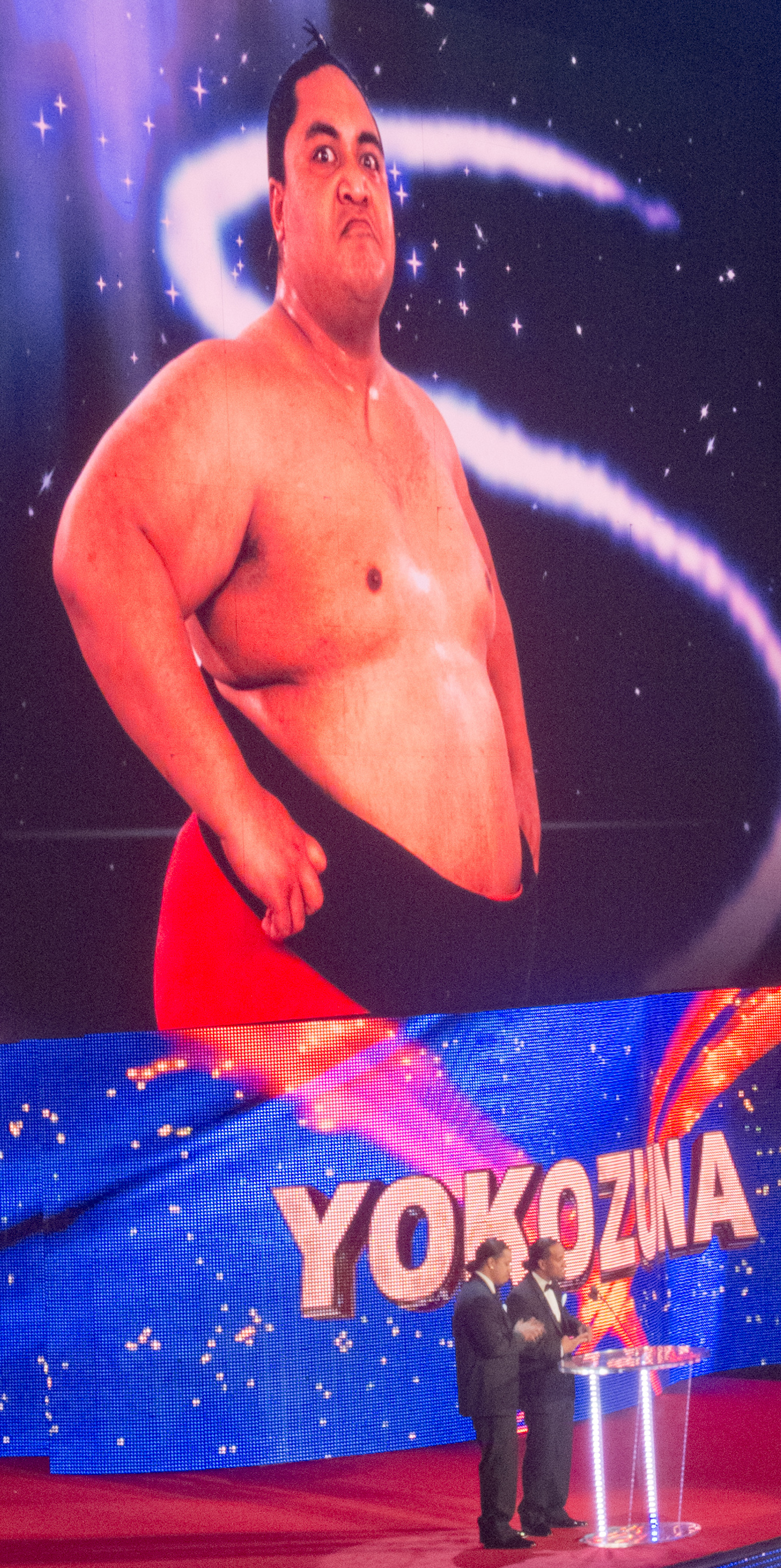
The Usos inducting Yokozuna into the WWE Hall of Fame in 2012

- Pro Wrestling Illustrated
  - Most Improved Wrestler of the Year (1993)
  - PWI ranked him #5 of the 500 best singles wrestlers in the PWI 500 in 1993
  - PWI ranked him #145 of the 500 best singles wrestlers during the "PWI Years" in 2003
- Universal Wrestling Association
  - UWA World Trios Championship (1 time) – with Fatu and Samoan Savage
- World Wrestling Federation / WWE
  - WWF Championship (2 times)
  - WWF Tag Team Championship (2 times) – with Owen Hart
  - Royal Rumble (1993)
  - WWE Hall of Fame (Class of 2012)

== See also ==
- List of premature professional wrestling deaths
