= WrestleMania XI =

1995 World Wrestling Federation pay-per-view event

- Promotional poster
- Promotion: World Wrestling Federation
- Date: April 2, 1995
- City: Hartford, Connecticut
- Venue: Hartford Civic Center
- Attendance: 16,305
- Buy rate: North America: 340,000

Pay-per-view chronology
← Previous; Royal Rumble	Next → In Your House 1

WrestleMania chronology
← Previous; X	Next → XII

WrestleMania XI was a 1995 professional wrestling pay-per-view (PPV) event produced by the World Wrestling Federation (WWF, renamed WWE in 2002). It was the 11th annual WrestleMania and took place on April 2, 1995, at the Hartford Civic Center in Hartford, Connecticut. Seven matches were contested at the event.

The main event featured former National Football League linebacker Lawrence Taylor against Bam Bam Bigelow, a match which came as the result of an argument that took place between the two at January's Royal Rumble. Taylor won the match, which led to Bigelow being kicked out of Ted DiBiase's Million Dollar Corporation. Shawn Michaels faced WWF Champion Diesel in a title match but was unable to win the championship. Jeff Jarrett retained his WWF Intercontinental Championship against Razor Ramon. Owen Hart and his mystery partner, Yokozuna, challenged The Smoking Gunns for the WWF Tag Team Championship and won the title.

The match between Taylor and Bigelow brought the WWF mainstream press coverage. The reactions to the match were mixed; some people thought that Taylor performed surprisingly well for a non-wrestler. Others thought that the WWF pushing a football player to defeat a wrestler made professional wrestling look bad. Reviews of the event as a whole were mixed, with the event being called both the worst WrestleMania of all time and the event that saved the WWF.

== Production ==
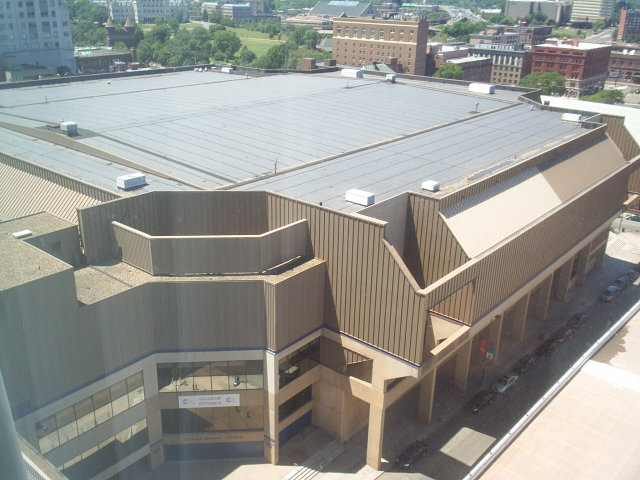
The 11th annual WrestleMania was held at the Hartford Civic Center in Hartford, Connecticut.

=== Background ===
WrestleMania is considered the World Wrestling Federation's (WWF, renamed WWE in 2002) flagship professional wrestling pay-per-view (PPV) event, having first been held in 1985. It has become the longest-running professional wrestling event in history and is held annually between mid-March to mid-April. It was the first of the WWF's original four PPVs, which includes Royal Rumble, SummerSlam, and Survivor Series, referred to as the "Big Four", and was considered one of the "Big Five" PPVs with the addition of King of the Ring in 1993. WrestleMania XI was scheduled to be held on April 2, 1995, at the Hartford Civic Center in Hartford, Connecticut.

Special Olympian Kathy Huey sang a rendition of "America the Beautiful" during the event, replacing the previously advertised band, Fishbone. Prior to Lawrence Taylor's match against Bam Bam Bigelow, Salt-n-Pepa sang '"Whatta Man'". Several other celebrities also had roles at WrestleMania. Nicholas Turturro, one of the stars of NYPD Blue, conducted interviews and served as a guest ring announcer. Jonathan Taylor Thomas of Home Improvement was a guest timekeeper for the match between Diesel and Shawn Michaels. WrestleMania XI also marked the first time that the WWF featured an interview on the Internet as Diesel and Shawn Michaels were interviewed by Bob Ryder.

On September 30, 1995, a one-hour special including the Diesel vs. Shawn Michaels match and the Lawrence Taylor vs. Bam Bam Bigelow match was broadcast on the FOX Network. During WrestleMania weekend, the WWF also held its Fan Fest, a promotional event during which wrestlers interacted with fans and signed autographs.

=== Storylines ===
The most heavily promoted feud going into the event was between Bam Bam Bigelow and Lawrence Taylor. At the 1995 Royal Rumble, Bigelow teamed with Tatanka in the final round of a tournament for the WWF Tag Team Championship. Bigelow was pinned at the end of the match, which led to the crowd heckling him. He responded by pushing NFL player Lawrence Taylor, who was sitting at ringside. Bigelow refused to apologize and instead challenged Taylor to a wrestling match. Taylor agreed and trained with WWF Champion Diesel to prepare for the match. The storyline between Bigelow and Taylor brought the WWF much mainstream exposure, as the match was discussed by several news outlets.

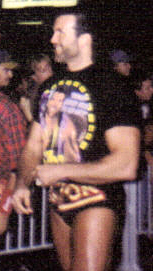
Razor Ramon feuded with Intercontinental Champion Jeff Jarrett.

The other main event at WrestleMania was a match for the WWF Championship between Diesel and Shawn Michaels. Diesel had originally entered the WWF as Michaels's bodyguard but later began wrestling and forming a tag team with Michaels. The pair held the WWF Tag Team Championship together in 1994. At Survivor Series 1994, Michaels accidentally kicked Diesel in the face. This led to an argument during which Diesel dissolved the tag team and vacated the championship. Three days later, Diesel defeated Bob Backlund to become the new WWF Champion. Michaels won the main event match at the Royal Rumble, which earned him a match against Diesel for the title belt at WrestleMania.

The WWF Intercontinental Championship was also defended at WrestleMania. Jeff Jarrett, the champion, had been feuding with Razor Ramon, the challenger, for several months. At the Royal Rumble, Jarrett was accompanied by The Roadie, who interfered on Jarrett's behalf and helped Jarrett win the championship. To even the sides in the rematch at WrestleMania, Ramon was accompanied by his friend, the 1–2–3 Kid.

The Smoking Gunns defended their WWF Tag Team Championship against Owen Hart and a mystery partner. Hart refused to tell anyone the name of his partner, which left the Gunns uncertain who they would be facing and led to much speculation about the identity of the mystery partner.

Bret Hart and Bob Backlund began feuding the previous summer, when Hart defended the WWF Championship against Backlund. Backlund mistakenly thought he won the match and began celebrating, but Hart pinned him to retain the title. After the match, Backlund turned heel by attacking Hart. This led to a title match at Survivor Series 1994, in which Backlund won the title from Hart. Although Backlund soon lost the belt, the feud continued and Backlund attacked Hart during Hart's match at the Royal Rumble. This led to an "I Quit" match at WrestleMania.

Also at the Royal Rumble, The Undertaker faced Irwin R. Schyster as part of The Undertaker's feud with Ted DiBiase's Million Dollar Corporation. During the match, King Kong Bundy, another Corporation member, interfered and enabled the Corporation to steal The Undertaker's urn, which was said to be the source of his power.

== Event ==
Other on-screen personnel
Role:	Name:
English commentators	Vince McMahon
English commentators	Jerry Lawler
Spanish commentators	Carlos Cabrera
Spanish commentators	Hugo Savinovich
Spanish commentators	Ed Trucco
French commentators	Jean Brassard
French commentators	Ray Rougeau
German commentators	Carsten Schaefer
German commentators	Günter Zapf
Interviewers	Gorilla Monsoon (Coliseum Video)
Interviewers	Todd Pettengill
Interviewers	Jim Ross
Interviewers	Nicholas Turturro
Ring announcers	Howard Finkel
Ring announcers	Nicholas Turturro (Shawn Michaels vs Diesel match)
Referees	Mike Chioda
Referees	Danny Davis
Referees	Jack Doan
Referees	Earl Hebner
Referees	Tim White

In the opening match, The Allied Powers (Davey Boy Smith and Lex Luger) faced the Blu Brothers (Eli Blu and Jacob Blu). Smith started out on the offensive, but Jacob gained control with a running bulldog throw. The Blus capitalized on the fact that they are identical twins by switching places without tagging while the referee was not looking. Luger came into the match near the end and performed a running forearm smash on Eli. Jacob tried to throw Luger with a powerbomb, but Luger tagged in Smith, who performed a sunset flip to pin Jacob and win the match.

The second match pitted Razor Ramon, with the 1–2–3 Kid in his corner, against WWF Intercontinental Champion Jeff Jarrett, who had The Roadie in his corner. Ramon took control at the beginning of the match by using power moves against Jarrett. Jarrett tried to leave the match, but the 1–2–3 Kid forced him back into the ring. Jarrett took advantage of one of Ramon's mistakes to gain the advantage. He applied a sleeper hold on Ramon, who used his strength advantage to escape the move. After Ramon threw Jarrett, the Kid attempted to interfere but was kicked by Jarrett. Ramon jumped off the ropes to attack Jarrett, but Jarrett avoided the move and applied a figure four leglock on Ramon. Ramon reversed the move to place the pressure on Jarrett's legs. He then threw Jarrett to the mat with a suplex from the second rope and prepared to execute the Razor's Edge, his finishing move. The Roadie entered the ring and attacked Ramon, prompting the referee to disqualify Jarrett; because titles cannot change hands on a disqualification, Jarrett retained his championship.

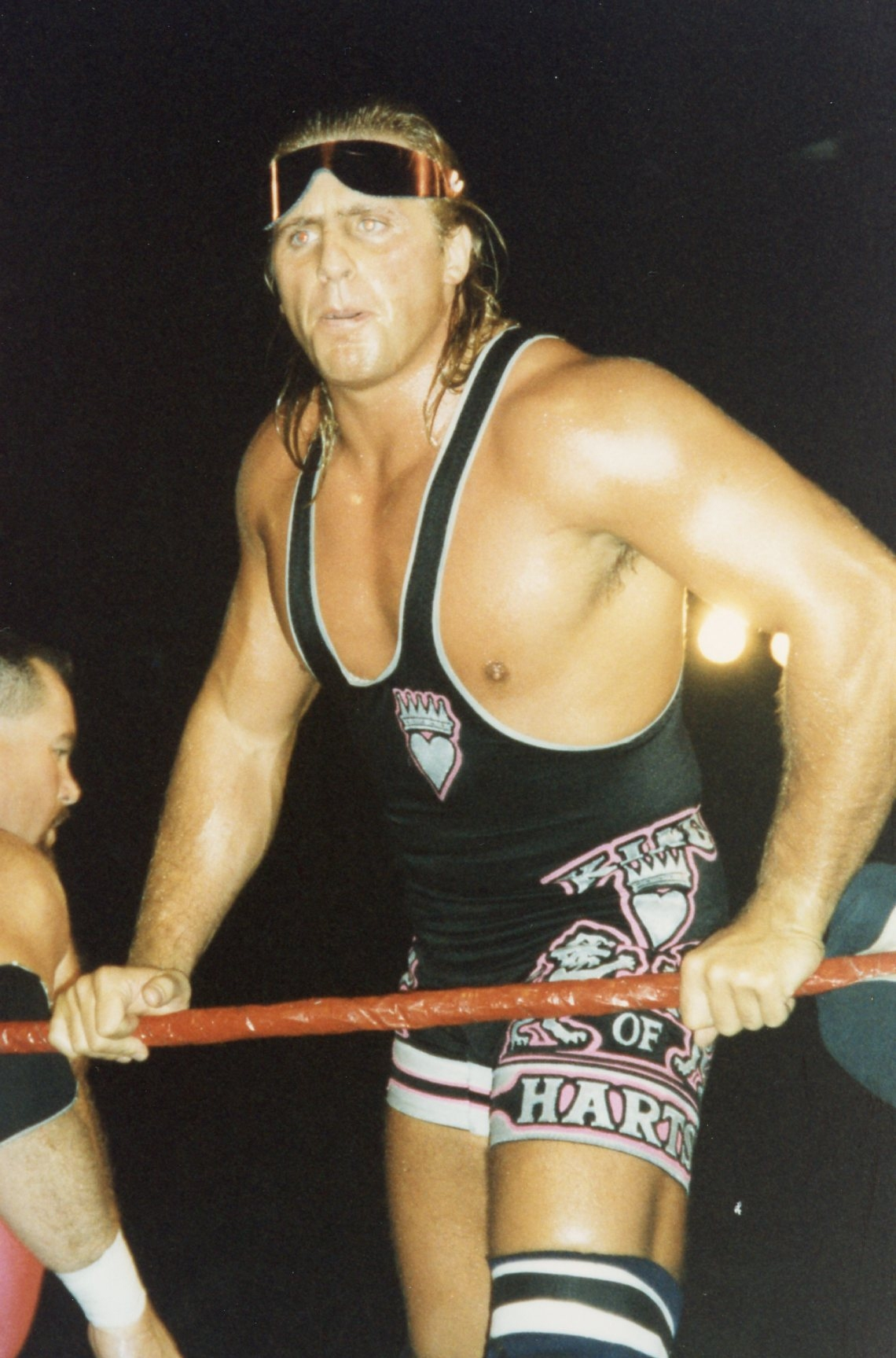
Owen Hart teamed with Yokozuna to become WWF Tag Team Champions

In the next match, The Undertaker faced King Kong Bundy. Ted DiBiase was at ringside holding the urn that his wrestlers had stolen from The Undertaker. Larry Young, a legit American League umpire, was the special referee for the match. Young's storyline was as an out-of-work sports official because of the recently ended MLB Players Association strike and a lockout of the Major League Umpires Association umpires (which led to the eventual dissolution of the MLUA in 2000; prior to the new union, umpires were split by league). The Undertaker took control at the beginning of the match by jumping off the top rope and hitting Bundy. He then performed several clothesline attacks on Bundy. Bundy responded with a clothesline that knocked The Undertaker out of the ring. Seeing DiBiase close, The Undertaker took back his urn. After The Undertaker returned to the ring, DiBiase called Kama, another Corporation member, to the ring. Kama stole the urn, and Bundy attacked The Undertaker in order to let Kama escape backstage. Bundy picked The Undertaker up and powerslammed him to the mat. He then performed an Avalanche Splash to crush The Undertaker against the corner of the ring. The Undertaker was unharmed, however, and performed a powerslam and a clothesline on Bundy before pinning him to win the match.

The Smoking Gunns defended their WWF Tag Team Championship in the next match against Owen Hart and his mystery partner, who was revealed to be Yokozuna. The Gunns worked together to control the match at the beginning, but Yokozuna gained control by performing a leg drop on Billy Gunn. Hart attempted to perform a dropkick from the top rope but accidentally hit Yokozuna. The Gunns briefly took control until Yokozuna performed a belly to belly suplex and landed on Billy. He then performed a Banzai Drop, jumping from the second rope and sitting on Billy's chest. Hart tagged in and considered performing the Sharpshooter submission hold; instead, he pinned Billy Gunn to win the title belts for his team.

The next match, an "I Quit" match, took place between Bret Hart and Bob Backlund, with Roddy Piper as the guest referee. It was explained that, in order to win the match, a wrestler must force his opponent to say "I quit" into a microphone held by Piper. Hart attempted to perform the Sharpshooter early in the match; when Backlund blocked it, Hart executed a figure four leglock instead. Backlund escaped the hold and began trying to injure Hart's arm with an armbar hold. Hart then tried to attack Backlund in the corner of the ring, but Backlund moved and Hart hit his shoulder against the ring post. Backlund tried to perform the crossface chickenwing, his signature submission hold. Hart blocked him and performed the same hold on Backlund instead. Backlund made an unintelligible sound into the microphone, and Piper determined that he had submitted. As a result, the win was awarded to Bret Hart.

In the next match, which was for the WWF Championship, challenger Shawn Michaels was accompanied to the ring by Jenny McCarthy and Diesel, the champion, was escorted by Pamela Anderson. Michaels relied on his quickness in the opening stages, while Diesel used his strength advantage against Michaels. Diesel threw Michaels out of the ring and onto the arena floor, but Michaels later performed a clothesline that knocked Diesel out of the ring. Michaels capitalized on his advantage by performing several aerial moves, including a flying crossbody, flying bulldog throw, and a diving elbow drop. He was unable to pin Diesel, however, so he performed a sleeper hold to wear Diesel down. They brawled outside the ring, after which Michaels performed Sweet Chin Music, his finishing move, but Sid, Michaels's bodyguard, had the referee distracted and unable to count the pinfall. Diesel recovered and controlled the remainder of the match with power moves before throwing Michaels to the mat with a botched Jackknife and getting the pinfall victory.

The final bout of the event was the main event match between Bam Bam Bigelow and Lawrence Taylor. Bigelow was accompanied by the members of DiBiase's Million Dollar Corporation: King Kong Bundy, Tatanka, Irwin R. Schyster, Kama, and Nikolai Volkoff. To prevent the Corporation members from interfering, Taylor brought several football players: Ken Norton Jr., Chris Spielman, Rickey Jackson, Carl Banks, Reggie White, and Steve McMichael. Taylor gained the advantage early and performed a clothesline that knocked Bigelow out of the ring. Once he returned to the ring, Bigelow took control of the match by kicking Taylor repeatedly and performing a Boston crab submission hold to hurt Taylor's back. Taylor got out of the hold and threw Bigelow with a suplex. Bigelow recovered and performed several headbutts on Taylor before executing a moonsault flip to knock Taylor down to the mat. Taylor began to take control of the match again, but Bigelow kicked him in the back of the head and then performed a headbutt from the top rope. Bigelow was unable to pin Taylor, however. Taylor climbed to the second rope, jumped off, and used his forearm to hit Bigelow. He then covered Bigelow to win the match.

== Reception ==
The event was attended by 15,000 fans, who paid a total of $750,000 in admission fees. This was down from the previous year's attendance of 18,065, but the decline could be attributed to the smaller size of the venue for WrestleMania XI. The attendance figure was also lower than the following year's figure of 18,852 fans at WrestleMania XII. The pay-per-view buyrate for WrestleMania XI was 1.3, which was lower than the 1.68 buyrate for WrestleMania X but higher than the 1.2 buyrate for WrestleMania XII.

Writing for 411mania, columnist Dustin James rated the event as the seventeenth best of the first twenty-three WrestleManias. He stated that the event did not have any truly amazing matches but that Lawrence Taylor put on a solid performance. John Powell of SLAM! Wrestling rated the event as the worst WrestleMania of all time. The specific concerns he mentioned in his review are Diesel's championship reign and WWF allowing a football player to defeat a wrestler in what he describes as a "sham of a match". In contrast, Pro Wrestling Illustrated columnist Dave Rosenbaum stated that WrestleMania "saved" the WWF in its feud with rival World Championship Wrestling (WCW). He argued that Taylor "looked like a pro" and contributed to an "incredible" match. He also observed that the tag team matches helped rejuvenate an area of wrestling that had been suffering in the WWF and that the match between Michaels and Diesel was a candidate for match of the year. Bret Hart was critical about his match against Bob Backlund, claiming it was "probably my worst pay-per-view match I ever had".

== Aftermath ==
Shortly after WrestleMania, Diesel offered Shawn Michaels a rematch. Michaels blamed Sid for the loss and informed him that he would not be needed during the match. Sid got angry and attacked Michaels until Diesel saved him. Diesel and Michaels became allies once again, and they teamed up to win the WWF Tag Team Championship later that year. Diesel feuded with Sid and defeated him at the In Your House 1 and In Your House 2 pay-per-view events. The animosity lingered between Michaels and Sid, but they did not face each other to settle the feud until the September 11, 1995 episode of Monday Night Raw.

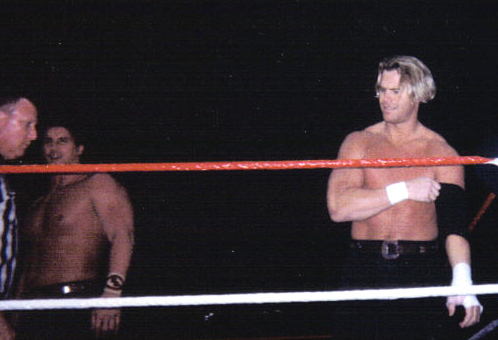
The Smoking Gunns were unable to retain the World Tag Team Championship against Owen Hart and Yokozuna.

Bam Bam Bigelow was embarrassed after losing to Lawrence Taylor. To redeem himself, he challenged Diesel to a match for the WWF Championship. During the match, Tatanka turned on Bigelow and caused him to get pinned. Bigelow was kicked out of the Million Dollar Corporation and attacked by DiBiase's wrestlers. Diesel saved Bigelow from the attack, which led to a friendship being formed between the two. Bigelow defeated Tatanka in a dark match at In Your House 1. At King of the Ring 1995, Sid, DiBiase's latest addition to the Corporation, teamed with Tatanka in a loss to the team of Diesel and Bigelow.

Razor Ramon and the 1–2–3 Kid was scheduled to face Jeff Jarrett and The Roadie at In Your House 1 the month after WrestleMania. The Kid sustained a legit injury, however, and was unable to compete. As a result, Ramon wrestled a two-on-one handicap match against Jarrett and The Roadie instead. Ramon won the bout, but the feud continued. At In Your House 2, The Roadie faced the 1–2–3 Kid and defeated him. Ramon and Jarrett wrestled several times, and Ramon regained the Intercontinental Championship on May 19, 1995. He held the belt for three days before dropping it back to Jarrett.

After WrestleMania, Kama melted down The Undertaker's urn and made it into a necklace. The Undertaker defeated Kama in a dark match at In Your House 1, and again in a casket match at In Your House 2. He then won another casket match against Kama at SummerSlam 1995 to end the feud. The Undertaker was not able to recapture the remnants of the urn until he ended his feud with King Mabel in another Casket match. The Undertaker's streak of 21 consecutive WrestleMania victories was first acknowledged during his entrance for his encounter with King Kong Bundy by play-by-play commentator Vince McMahon, who stated, "The Undertaker, on his way to the ring—a man who's never lost at WrestleMania".

The Smoking Gunns were given a rematch for the WWF Tag Team Championship at In Your House 1. Hart pinned Bart Gunn to retain the championship for his team. Hart and Yokozuna then moved on to face other competition, and the Gunns did not become serious contenders for the title again until late in 1995 when they defeated Hart and Yokozuna to regain the championship.

Steve McMichael, who accompanied Lawrence Taylor, joined World Championship Wrestling (WCW) later in 1995 as a color commentator then eventually as an in-ring performer, joining the famous Four Horsemen when he turned on and betrayed his tag team partner and former NFL star Kevin Greene at The Great American Bash '96 near the end of their tag team match against Ric Flair and Arn Anderson. Going by the name "Mongo" McMichael, he eventually went on to win the WCW United States Heavyweight Championship.

The WWF released the event on VHS in North America in 1995. The VHS version was then re-released on March 2, 1999. The event was also released on DVD in North America as part of the WrestleMania Complete Anthology boxed set on November 1, 2005. In the United Kingdom, the event was released on VHS on July 10, 1995. Packaged together with WrestleMania XII, it was then released on DVD in the United Kingdom as part of the WWE Tagged Classics line on August 7, 2006.

== Results ==
No.	Results	Stipulations	Times
1	The Allied Powers (Lex Luger and The British Bulldog) defeated The Blu Brothers (Jacob Blu and Eli Blu) (with Uncle Zebekiah)	Tag team match	6:34
2	Razor Ramon (with The 1–2–3 Kid) defeated Jeff Jarrett (c) (with The Roadie) by disqualification	Singles match for the WWF Intercontinental Championship	13:32
3	The Undertaker (with Paul Bearer) defeated King Kong Bundy (with Ted DiBiase)	Singles match Larry Young was the special guest referee.	6:36
4	Owen Hart and Yokozuna (with Mr. Fuji and Jim Cornette) defeated The Smoking Gunns (Billy Gunn and Bart Gunn) (c)	Tag team match for the WWF Tag Team Championship	9:42
5	Bret Hart defeated Bob Backlund by making Backlund say "I quit"	"I Quit" match Roddy Piper was the special guest referee.	9:34
6	Diesel (c) (with Pamela Anderson) defeated Shawn Michaels (with Sid and Jenny McCarthy)	Singles match for the WWF Championship	20:35
7	Lawrence Taylor defeated Bam Bam Bigelow (with Ted DiBiase)	Singles match Pat Patterson was the special guest referee.	11:42
(c) / – the champion(s) heading into the match
