= Allied Powers (professional wrestling) =

Professional wrestling tag team

Tag team
- Members: Lex Luger; The British Bulldog
- Name(s): Allied Powers; Lex Luger and The British Bulldog
- Billed heights: Luger: 6 ft 4 in (1.93 m); Bulldog: 5 ft 11 in (1.80 m)
- Combined billed weight: 526 lb (239 kg)
- Debut: January 2, 1995
- Disbanded: September 11, 1995
- Years active: 1995 (8 months)

The Allied Powers was a professional wrestling tag team in the World Wrestling Federation who consisted of Lex Luger and "The British Bulldog" Davey Boy Smith for eight months in 1995. Their name is a reference to the close friendship between the United States and the United Kingdom, as well as their alliance in World War II. At the time, both men portrayed themselves as patriotic symbols of their countries.

== History ==
=== Starting up ===
The tag team of Lex Luger and Davey Boy Smith was formed on January 2, 1995, edition of Monday Night Raw when they defeated the team of Bam Bam Bigelow and Tatanka during Luger's feud with Ted DiBiase's Million Dollar Corporation. They also had a series of matches at house shows that month against Bigelow and King Kong Bundy. The following month, Luger was wrestling Bundy when Tatanka interfered; Smith came to the ring to help Luger. The team was later dubbed Allied Powers bringing the United States and the United Kingdom together.

=== World Tag Team Championship shot ===
The Allied Powers defeated the Blu Brothers, a team of Jacob Blu and Eli Blu, in the opening match of WrestleMania XI. They continued to feud with Ted DiBiase's Million Dollar Corporation. Smith and Luger continued to compete as singles wrestlers, but they teamed up regularly and defeated such teams as Men on a Mission, Well Dunn, The Heavenly Bodies, and the team of Jeff Jarrett and The Roadie. The Allied Powers had several matches against new World Tag Team Champions Owen Hart and Yokozuna. They received a shot at Hart and Yokozuna's World Tag Team Championship at In Your House 2, but the team lost when Yokozuna pinned Luger following a Leg drop.

=== Ending ===
The team's success declined in August 1995, and they lost a match to Men on a Mission on August 11. The following night, on a Madison Square Garden house show, Smith grabbed the mic and asked fans to tone down their "U.S.A." chant out of consideration to him, but they refused and kept on doing the chant. Smith deserted Luger by walking away during the scheduled match against the Blu Brothers. Smith also walked out on Luger during several matches against Owen Hart and Yokozuna. On the August 21 edition of Monday Night Raw, Luger and Smith were scheduled to take on Men on a Mission. Luger couldn't perform in the match due to a family emergency so Smith asked then-WWF World Heavyweight Champion Diesel to become his partner for only one night, since Diesel was feuding with King Mabel and would face him at SummerSlam 1995 for Diesel's WWF World Heavyweight Championship. During the match, Smith turned heel after hitting Diesel from behind and assisting Men on a Mission in an attack on the champion. Luger took the opposite side in the feud between Mabel and Diesel, as he got involved at SummerSlam to prevent Sir Mo from interfering on Mabel's behalf. With no long-term contract, Luger signed with WCW, appearing on the first episode of Monday Nitro on September 4, 1995, thus ending the Allied Powers. Originally, a feud was supposed to start in a series of Flag Matches.

=== Aftermath ===
In a subsequent interview, Smith, now managed by Jim Cornette (and thus an ally to former foes Owen Hart and Yokozuna) explained that he had turned because of resentment at American fans' only chanting "U.S.A.", implying support for Luger only, and how when he wrestled Owen Hart, he heard chants of "We want Bret! We want Bret!". A rebuttal interview with Luger was supposed to take place, but was canned after Luger left the WWF. Smith went on to feud with Diesel and other faces while Luger, now in WCW, became a tweener who only sought the WCW World Heavyweight Championship.

Smith, along with The Hart Foundation stablemate and relative Jim Neidhart, would leave the WWF after the Montreal Screwjob in November 1997, and join WCW. On June 29, 1998, Smith and Neidhart lost to Luger and Sting in the only match in which the former tag team partners met. Smith returned to WWF in fall of 1999 and was released again in May 2000.

Smith died of a heart attack on May 18, 2002, at 39 years old.
