= Pettengill =

Pettengill may refer to:

== People ==
- Allison Amos Pettengill (1808–1882), American politician and newspaper editor
- Dawn Pettengill (born 1955), American politician
- Gordon Pettengill (1926–2021), American radio astronomer and planetary physicist
- Samuel B. Pettengill (1886–1974), American politician and nephew of William Horace Clagett
- Todd Pettengill (born 1961), American radio disc jockey
- Tracey Pettengill Turner (born c. 1971), entrepreneur

== Other uses ==
- 3831 Pettengill, a main-belt asteroid
- C. F. Pettengill House, historic house at 53 Revere Road in Quincy, Massachusetts
- Estadio Juan Canuto Pettengill, multi-use stadium in Itaugua, Paraguay

== See also ==
- Pettingill
