= In Your House 1 =

1995 World Wrestling Federation pay-per-view event

- VHS cover featuring Diesel and Sid
- Promotion: World Wrestling Federation
- Date: May 14, 1995
- City: Syracuse, New York
- Venue: Onondaga County War Memorial
- Attendance: 7,000
- Buy rate: 332,000

Pay-per-view chronology
← Previous; WrestleMania XI	Next → King of the Ring

In Your House chronology
← Previous; First	Next → 2

In Your House, retroactively titled In Your House: Premiere and sequentially known as In Your House 1, was a 1995 professional wrestling pay-per-view (PPV) event produced by the World Wrestling Federation (WWF, renamed WWE in 2002). It was the inaugural In Your House and took place on May 14, 1995, at the Onondaga County War Memorial in Syracuse, New York. The In Your House series was established to be held as monthly PPVs to take place between the WWF's "Big Five" PPVs at the time: WrestleMania, King of the Ring, SummerSlam, Survivor Series, and Royal Rumble. The event's retroactive renaming was in reference to it being the premiere of the In Your House series.

The event consisted of 11 professional wrestling matches, six of which were broadcast live on PPV. In the main event, WWF Champion Diesel defeated Sid to retain his title. On the undercard, Bret Hart defeated Hakushi, but lost to Jerry Lawler, whereas Razor Ramon defeated Jeff Jarrett and The Roadie in a two-on-one handicap match. Although contest as a dark match, this event marked Hunter Hearst Helmsley's (later known as Triple H) first match at a PPV event.

The pay-per-view received a 0.83 buyrate, equivalent to approximately 332,000 buys.

== Production ==
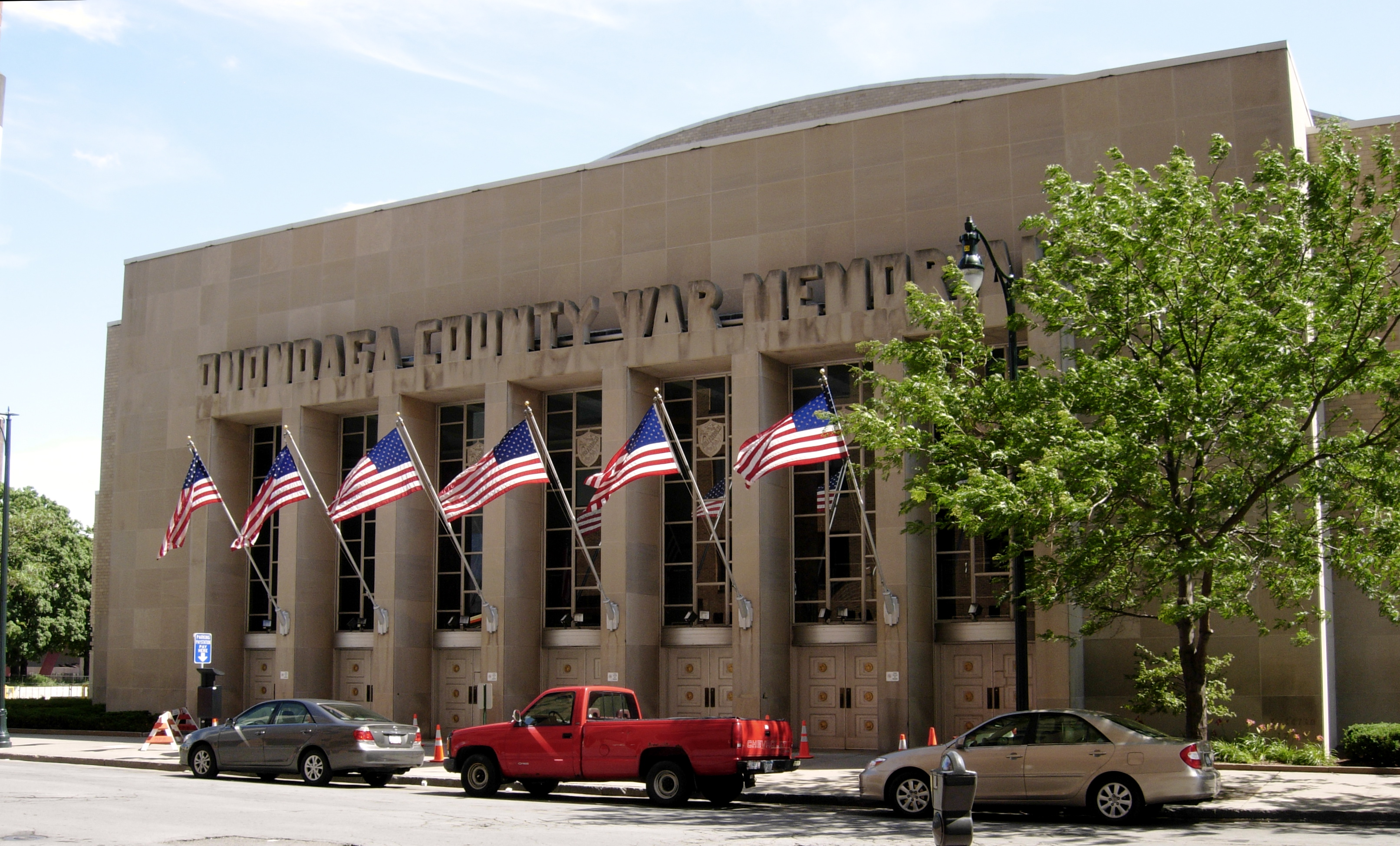
The inaugural In Your House was held at the Onondaga County War Memorial in Syracuse, New York.

=== Background ===
By 1993, the World Wrestling Federation (WWF, renamed WWE in 2002) held a total of five professional wrestling pay-per-view (PPV) events per year, referred to as the "Big Five", which were WrestleMania, King of the Ring, SummerSlam, Survivor Series, and the Royal Rumble. In early 1995, as a response to a move by competitor World Championship Wrestling (WCW) to increase its annual PPV events, the WWF established the "In Your House" series, which would be monthly PPVs that were held between the Big Five and sold at a lower cost—the Big Five had cost US$29.95 each, while the In Your House shows would cost $14.95. The cheaper price was also an effort to increase the WWF's revenue from the PPV market after the decline and cancelation of its network television Saturday Night's Main Event broadcasts, and its insufficient revenue from home video releases. Additionally, while the Big Five at the time ran for three hours, the In Your House shows would only run for two hours.

The first In Your House was scheduled to take place on May 14, 1995, at the Onondaga County War Memorial in Syracuse, New York. The WWF ran a sweepstakes to promote the event, giving away a new house in Orlando, Florida. Todd Pettengill and Stephanie Wiand toured the house and conducted the drawing during the PPV, which was won by an 11-year-old resident of Henderson, Nevada and presented to his family during the May 22 episode of Raw. They sold the house for $175,000 six months later.

This first In Your House event was initially known simply as In Your House. It was later retroactively renamed as In Your House: Premiere due to it being the premiere of the In Your House series. It would sequentially be known simply as In Your House 1.

=== Storylines ===
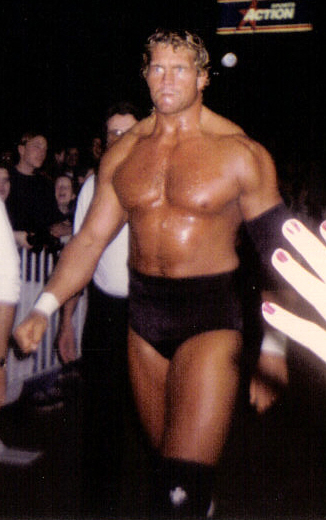
Sid (pictured), who challenged Diesel for the WWF Championship at In Your House.

The most prominent rivalry heading into the pay-per-view was between then-WWF Champion Diesel and his storyline rival Sid. At the previous pay-per-view, WrestleMania XI, Diesel defeated Shawn Michaels to retain the WWF Championship, partly due to an interference by Michaels' bodyguard Sid backfiring. The following night, Michaels stated that for a potential rematch, he would give Sid the night off, causing the bodyguard to turn on Michaels by powerbombing him three times. Diesel eventually came out to help Michaels. Michaels was legitimately injured, and this sidelined him for six weeks, effectively shelving plans for a rematch between Diesel and Michaels. Diesel was then scheduled to defend his title against Bam Bam Bigelow, a member of the Million Dollar Corporation stable, after a staged confrontation between the two on the April 16, 1995 episode of Action Zone, a secondary television program for the WWF. On the same day, on Wrestling Challenge, another secondary television program, in a segment featuring the corporation, Bigelow was noticeably snubbed, signaling a turn. Over the weekend of April 16, a match between Sid and Diesel was scheduled for In Your House, in which Sid could potentially face Diesel for the WWF Championship, depending on whether he retained or lost his title against Bigelow. On the April 24 episode of Raw, Sid stated he was unhappy about this stipulation, as it meant that if Bigelow won, Sid would not get a shot at the title. Diesel retained the title when the Corporation turned on Bigelow, with Tatanka tripping Bigelow as he ran off the ropes. Diesel hit Bigelow with a big boot and executed a powerbomb for the win. After the contest, Bigelow was insulted by Ted DiBiase and attacked by the corporation. Diesel, who had gone back to the locker room, came to Bigelow's aid. In Sid's match with Razor Ramon on the May 1 episode of Raw, Diesel approached the ring ready to fight Sid, who, along with the corporation's manager DiBiase, left the arena abruptly. The following week on Raw, DiBiase revealed that he and Sid had been working together for a while, admitting that it was him who told Shawn Michaels to get a bodyguard.

Prior to the event, the feud between Bret Hart and Jerry Lawler, which dated back to King of the Ring 1993, was revived to also include Hakushi. After Hart won the WWF Magazine "Award of the People" on the February 20, 1995 episode of Raw, Jerry Lawler suggested that Japanese votes had been excluded and that Hart was a racist. Lawler persuaded Hakushi that Hart was a racist, and on the March 25 episode of Superstars of Wrestling, Hakushi attacked Bret after he received a separate award from the Japanese media. On the April 10 episode of Raw, Bret teamed up with the 1–2–3 Kid and Bob Holly to take on Hakushi and the WWF Tag Team Champions, Owen Hart and Yokozuna. Bret's team won the match as Holly pinned Owen. On the April 23 episode of Wrestling Challenge a match between Bret and Hakushi was set for In Your House. On the same day, on Action Zone, Bret teamed with Razor Ramon to take on WWF Intercontinental Champion Jeff Jarrett (accompanied by The Roadie) and Hakushi. Bret and Ramon won the match, with Ramon pinning Jarrett. On the May 1 episode of Raw, Bret offered to face Lawler at In Your House after his scheduled match with Hakushi. Bret dedicated his match with Lawler at In Your House to his mother, as the pay-per-view was going to take place on Mother's Day. Lawler also responded that on the May 8 episode of Raw that his mother was going to be at ringside for their encounter.

The most prominent rivalry on the undercard was for the WWF Intercontinental Championship. The feud took place between Razor Ramon, the 1–2–3 Kid, the Intercontinental Champion Jeff Jarrett, and his personal enforcer, The Roadie. Ramon and Jarrett faced each other at WrestleMania XI, but Jarrett was disqualified. Jarrett faced Aldo Montoya on the April 8 episode of Superstars of Wrestling in a non-title match, where Jarrett accidentally pinned himself (he never lifted his shoulder off the ground after being slammed to the mat by Montoya). Jarrett was initially announced the winner, but Montoya was later declared the winner. Jarrett and Montoya faced each other again two weeks later, on the April 22 episode of Superstars of Wrestling. During the match, Razor Ramon came to ringside and chased The Roadie backstage. Despite this, Jarrett managed to gain the victory, making Montoya submit to the figure four leglock. The next day on Wrestling Challenge, Ramon and the 1–2–3 Kid were scheduled to square off against Jarrett and The Roadie at In Your House. After a legitimate neck injury rendered the Kid unable to wrestle, the match was changed into a Handicap match, in which Ramon would face both Jarrett and The Roadie by himself.

The other main rivalry on the undercard was for the WWF Tag Team Championship between the team of Owen Hart and Yokozuna and The Smoking Gunns (Billy Gunn and Bart Gunn). The Smoking Gunns dropped their WWF Tag Team Championship to Hart and Yokozuna at WrestleMania XI, the previous pay-per-view event. Their rivalry was reignited on the April 23 episode of Action Zone, when the Blu Brothers (Jacob Blu and Eli Blu) faced the New Headshrinkers (Sionne and Fatu). Hart and Yokozuna interfered in the contest, attacking the New Headshrinkers, causing a disqualification. The Smoking Gunns ran to the ring, attacking Hart and Yokozuna. The Headshrinkers posed with Hart and Yokozuna's tag team belts and celebrated with the Smoking Gunns. The following night, on Raw, the Smoking Gunns were awarded a rematch for the WWF Tag Team Championship at the In Your House pay-per-view. They made their intentions of winning the title clear by quickly defeating Barry Horowitz and the Brooklyn Brawler. In their last encounter before the event, Bart defeated Hart via pinfall on the May 8 episode of Raw.

== Event ==
Before the event went live on pay-per-view, Hunter Hearst Helmsley defeated Phil Apollo and Jean-Pierre Lafitte defeated Bob Holly in a standard dark matches.

=== Preliminary matches ===
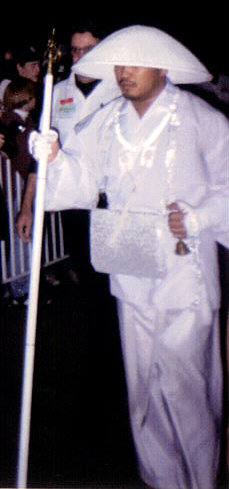
Hakushi, who faced Bret Hart at In Your House.

The first match that aired was a standard match between Bret Hart and Hakushi (managed by Shinja). Bret announced before the contest that he was dedicating his performances to his mother because it was Mother's Day. Jerry Lawler, who faced Bret later in the pay-per-view, watched the match backstage on a monitor. Bret won the contest, when he rolled-up Hakushi to gain a pinfall and end Hakushi's six-month-long undefeated streak. As Hart jumped to the arena floor after the contest, he appeared to legitimately injure his knee.

A two-on-one Handicap match was next as Razor Ramon faced Intercontinental Champion Jeff Jarrett and The Roadie. During the match, Jarrett went to perform the figure four leglock submission hold, but Ramon blocked the maneuver, sending Jarrett to collide with his partner. Ramon performed his "Razor's Edge" finishing move and pinned Jarrett for the victory. After the contest, Ramon tried to perform the "Razor's Edge" on The Roadie, but Jarrett attacked him and applied the figure four leglock. Aldo Montoya went to ringside and attempted to help Ramon, but Jarrett and The Roadie threw him to the arena floor. An "unknown man" ran to the ring and attacked both Jarrett and The Roadie, and several people escorted the "unknown man" backstage. Later in the pay-per-view, Ramon introduced the "unknown man" as Savio Vega during an interview in the "WWF Hotline Room", a fictitious interview room for the WWF.

A qualifying match for the 1995 King of the Ring tournament took place next as Mabel faced Adam Bomb in a standard match. The contest was one-sided and ended in two minutes when Mabel pinned Bomb after he powerslamed him down to the mat. Mabel advanced to the next round of the tournament, beginning a push for the superstar.

Next, Jerry Lawler went to the ring to give a promotional interview before his scheduled match with Bret Hart, declaring that he wanted his match with Bret to take place despite Bret's injury. Lawler was then sent backstage by Tony Garea and Rene Goulet, and Bret was shown icing down his knee.

Next was a tag team match for the WWF Tag Team Championship, where the team of Owen Hart and Yokozuna (managed by Jim Cornette and Mr. Fuji) defended their titles against The Smoking Gunns (Bart Gunn and Billy Gunn). Owen pinned Bart for the victory after Yokozuna delivered a leg drop to Bart's chest, therefore retaining the championship.

Other on-screen personnel
Role:	Name:
English commentators	Vince McMahon
English commentators	Dok Hendrix
Spanish commentators	Carlos Cabrera
Spanish commentators	Hugo Savinovich
Spanish commentators	Ed Trucco
Interviewers	Stephanie Wiand
Interviewers	Todd Pettengill
Ring announcer	Howard Finkel
Referees	Tim White
Referees	Jack Doan
Referees	Mike Chioda
Referees	Danny Davis
Referees	Earl Hebner

=== Main event matches ===
Before his match with Bret Hart, Lawler introduced a woman obviously younger than himself as his mother, and wished her a happy Mother's Day. Moments before the contest, Hart revealed that his knee injury was fake. During the contest, referee Earl Hebner became tied upside down in the ropes after being distracted by Shinja. While Hebner was tied upside down, Hakushi interfered and performed a diving headbutt to Hart. Lawler won the match when he rolled-up Hart for the pinfall.

The pay-per-view's main event was a standard match for the WWF Championship, where the champion Diesel defended the title against Sid (managed by Ted DiBiase). Late in the contest, Diesel performed a Jacknife Powerbomb on Sid and went for the pinfall. Tatanka came out and attacked Diesel, which resulted in Diesel retaining the championship via disqualification. Tatanka, along with DiBiase, attacked Diesel. Sid attempted to perform a powerbomb, but Bam Bam Bigelow ran to the ring, forcing the villains to go to the outside.

=== Dark matches ===
After the live pay-per-view went off the air there were 3 more dark matches. The first match was a qualifier for the King of the Ring tournament between Davey Boy Smith and Owen Hart (managed by Jim Cornette). The match went to a fifteen-minute time-limit draw. This match was taped for the June 5 episode of Raw.

The second match was between Bigelow and Tatanka, which Bigelow won after diving off the top rope and hitting a sunset flip for the pin. This match was also included on the VHS home video release.

The final match of the night was between The Undertaker and Kama in a standard match, which The Undertaker won after giving Kama a "Tombstone Piledriver". While this match was not shown on pay-per-view, it was included as a bonus match on the VHS home video release.

== Aftermath ==
The pay-per-view garnered 332,000 buys, which is equivalent to a 0.83 buyrate, a large number that generally surprised many pay-per-view providers. It had more buys than all the other In Your House pay-per-views, with In Your House: Good Friends, Better Enemies receiving the second highest buyrate of 324,000 buys.

At the following pay-per-view, King of the Ring, Diesel teamed up with Bam Bam Bigelow to defeat Sid and Tatanka. Sid faced Diesel in a rematch for the WWF Championship at the In Your House 2 pay-per-view in a Lumberjack match. Diesel retained the title after hitting Sid with his boot. Mabel's push culminated with him winning the King of the Ring tournament by defeating Savio Vega in the finals. With this, Mabel went on to face Diesel at SummerSlam for the WWF Championship, where Diesel retained the title. The rivalry between Bret Hart and Jerry Lawler also continued into King of the Ring, with the two facing each other at the event in a "Kiss My Foot" match. Hart won the match despite outside interference from Hakushi, making Lawler submit to the Sharpshooter. After the match, Hart forced Lawler to kiss his feet.

The In Your House shows would continue until February 1999's St. Valentine's Day Massacre: In Your House event, which was the 27th In Your House PPV. It would be the final In Your House event held as the company moved to install permanent names for each of its monthly PPVs, which began with Backlash in April 1999. Early advertising for that year's Backlash featured the "In Your House" branding until it was quietly dropped in the weeks leading to the pay-per-view. However, after 21 years in the promotion that was renamed to World Wrestling Entertainment (WWE) in 2002 (and "WWE" becoming an orphaned initialism in 2011), the promotion announced that In Your House would be revived for its NXT brand division as an NXT TakeOver event entitled TakeOver: In Your House on June 7, 2020, which aired exclusively on WWE's online streaming service, the WWE Network. The announcement and the event marked the 25th anniversary of the first In Your House PPV. A second TakeOver: In Your House was scheduled for June 13, 2021, thus making In Your House an annual subseries of TakeOver events held in June. This second event aired on both the WWE Network and traditional pay-per-view, thus returning In Your House to pay-per-view. One further In Your House was held for NXT in 2022, which was simply titled NXT In Your House after the TakeOver series was discontinued after the final TakeOver in August 2021. The In Your House series was subsequently again discontinued with the last event in 2022 only airing on WWE's livestreaming platforms.

== Results ==
No.	Results	Stipulations	Times
1^{D}	Hunter Hearst Helmsley defeated Phil Apollo	Singles match	6:38
2^{D}	Jean-Pierre Lafitte defeated Bob Holly	Singles match	5:32
3	Bret Hart defeated Hakushi (with Shinja)	Singles match	14:39
4	Razor Ramon defeated Jeff Jarrett and The Roadie	Handicap match	12:36
5	Mabel (with Mo) defeated Adam Bomb	King of the Ring qualifying match	1:54
6	Owen Hart and Yokozuna (c) (with Mr. Fuji and Jim Cornette) defeated The Smoking Gunns (Billy Gunn and Bart Gunn)	Tag team match for the WWF Tag Team Championship	5:44
7	Jerry Lawler defeated Bret Hart	Singles match	5:01
8	Diesel (c) defeated Sid (with Ted DiBiase) by disqualification	Singles match for the WWF Championship	11:31
9^{D}	Owen Hart vs. The British Bulldog ended in a draw (Note: The match was taped for the June 5 episode of Raw.)	King of the Ring qualifying match	15:00
10^{D}	Bam Bam Bigelow defeated Tatanka (with Ted DiBiase)	Singles match	8:50
11^{D}	The Undertaker (with Paul Bearer) defeated Kama (with Ted DiBiase)	Singles match	13:08
(c) / – the champion(s) heading into the match; D / – this was a dark match
