= King of the Ring (1995) =

World Wrestling Federation pay-per-view event

- Promotional poster
- Promotion: World Wrestling Federation
- Date: June 25, 1995
- City: Philadelphia, Pennsylvania
- Venue: CoreStates Spectrum
- Attendance: 16,590
- Buy rate: 150,000
- Tagline: Guts & Glory

Pay-per-view chronology
| ← Previous; In Your House 1 | Next → In Your House 2 |

King of the Ring event chronology
| ← Previous; 1994 | Next → 1996 |

King of the Ring tournament chronology
| ← Previous; 1994 | Next → 1996 |

The 1995 King of the Ring was a professional wrestling pay-per-view (PPV) event produced by the World Wrestling Federation (WWF, renamed WWE in 2002). It was the third annual King of the Ring event and hosted the finals of the ninth King of the Ring tournament for men. It took place on June 25, 1995, at the CoreStates Spectrum in Philadelphia, Pennsylvania. This event is somewhat notorious among WWE fans as it is considered one of the worst-ever pay-per-views produced by the company.

The main event was a tag team match in which WWF Champion Diesel and Bam Bam Bigelow faced Tatanka and Sycho Sid. Diesel won the match for his team by pinning Tatanka. The main matches on the undercard were Bret Hart versus Jerry Lawler in a "Kiss My Foot" match and the 1995 King of the Ring final, in which Mabel defeated Savio Vega to become the "King of the Ring".

In a departure from regular protocol, the Savio Vega vs. Irwin R. Schyster match originally shown on the Sunday Night Slam pre-show where the winner was added to the eight-man tournament, was included on the WWE Network feed of this show.

== Production ==
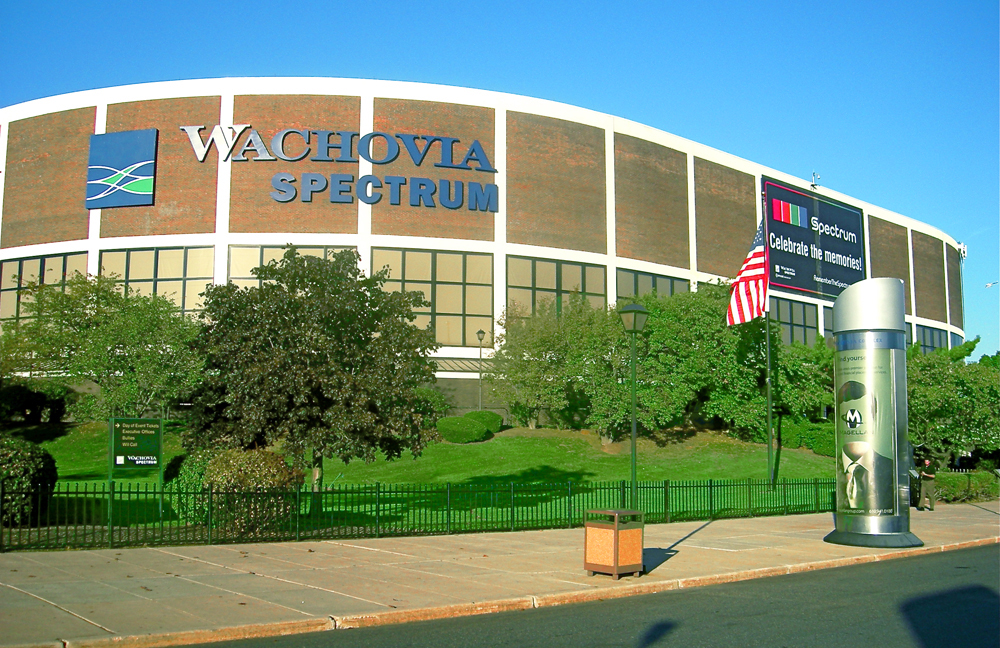
The third annual King of the Ring event was held in Philadelphia, Pennsylvania at the CoreStates Spectrum (pictured in 2008 after it had since been renamed as Wachovia Spectrum).

=== Background ===
King of the Ring was a professional wrestling pay-per-view (PPV) event held annually in June by the World Wrestling Federation (WWF, renamed WWE in 2002) since 1993. The PPV was named after the King of the Ring tournament, a men's single-elimination tournament that was established in 1985 and held annually until 1991, except for 1990, with the winner crowned the "King of the Ring"; these early tournaments were held as special non-televised house shows. The King of the Ring event became considered as one of the WWF's "Big Five" PPVs, along with the Royal Rumble, WrestleMania, SummerSlam, and Survivor Series, the company's five biggest annual shows of the year. The third King of the Ring event was scheduled to be held on June 25, 1995, at the CoreStates Spectrum in Philadelphia, Pennsylvania, and it hosted the finals of the ninth tournament.

Unlike the non-televised events, the PPV event did not feature all of the tournament's matches. Instead, several of the qualifying matches preceded the event with the final few matches then taking place at the PPV. Other matches took place at the event as it was a traditional three-hour PPV.

=== Storylines ===
Other on-screen personnel
| Role: | Name: |
|---|---|
| English commentators | Vince McMahon |
| English commentators | Dok Hendrix |
| Spanish commentators | Carlos Cabrera |
| Spanish commentators | Hugo Savinovich |
| Spanish commentators | Ed Trucco |
| Interviewers | Stephanie Wiand |
| Interviewers | Todd Pettengill |
| Ring announcer | Howard Finkel |
| Ring announcer | Bill Dunn |
| Referees | Tim White |
| Referees | Jack Doan |
| Referees | Mike Chioda |
| Referees | Danny Davis |
| Referees | Earl Hebner |

The main storyline going into the pay-per-view was the King of the Ring tournament itself. The first qualifying match took place at In Your House 1 where Mabel squashed Adam Bomb in the first round. The next First Round match took place on the May 15 edition of Raw, where Bob Holly defeated Mantaur to proceed to the Quarter-Finals. Razor Ramon proceeded to the Quarter-Finals on the May 20 edition of Superstars of Wrestling defeating Jacob Blu. Shawn Michaels was the next wrestler through to the Quarter-Finals, as he defeated King Kong Bundy on the May 22 edition of Raw. The next First-Round match took place on Superstars of Wrestling on May 27, where Kama defeated Duke Droese via Pinfall. At the beginning of the May 29 edition of Raw, WWF Intercontinental Champion Jeff Jarrett, along with The Roadie, cut a promo with Jarrett stating that he would defeat The Undertaker and advance to the Quarter-Finals of the King of the Ring tournament. Jarrett, however, was defeated by The Undertaker later in the night, with The Undertaker winning following a Tombstone Piledriver. Unlike Jarrett, The Roadie managed to advance to the Quarter-Finals, defeating Doink the Clown on the June 3 edition of Superstars of Wrestling because of a distraction from Jarrett at ringside. Owen Hart faced Davey Boy Smith on the June 5 edition of Raw (taped May 14, 1995, at In Your House 1) in the final First-Round match. The match, however, went to a fifteen-minute time-limit draw. Because of this, neither man proceeded to the next round, and a match between Yokozuna and Lex Luger took place on the June 12 edition of Raw. Yokozuna won the match via countout after performing a leg drop on the arena floor. Even though all of the places for the Quarter-Finals were now filled, Razor Ramon suffered a legitimate rib injury at a House show on June 9 in a ladder match against Jeff Jarrett meaning he could no longer compete in the tournament. As a result, the final Quarter-Final place was decided moments before the pay-per-view aired.

As well as the annual King of the Ring tournament heading into the event, there were two other major feuds heading into the PPV. The main feud was between WWF Champion Diesel, Bam Bam Bigelow, Tatanka and Sycho Sid. The feud began after WrestleMania XI and carried on into In Your House 1, where Diesel faced Sid for the WWF Championship. Diesel was set to retain the title after performing a Powerbomb on Sid, but Tatanka interfered and Kayfabe attacked Diesel. This resulted in Diesel retaining the championship via disqualification. The following night, on the May 15 edition of Raw, Ted DiBiase (Sid's and the Million Dollar Corporation's manager) proposed that Diesel, along with Bigelow should face DiBiase's team of Sid and Tatanka. In the main event, Bigelow was set to face Irwin R. Schyster – accompanied by DiBiase – when Bigelow announced that Diesel would be ringside in his corner for the matchup. Diesel chased DiBiase in the early stages of the matchup, which Bigelow won via pinfall. DiBiase returned to the ring after the match with his enforcers Sid and Tatanka. On the May 22 edition of Raw, Shawn Michaels returned from a legitimate injury received from Sid on the April 3 edition of Raw. Michaels defeated King Kong Bundy, who had DiBiase in his corner throughout the contest. After the contest, Bigelow and Diesel came out to congratulate Michaels on the victory. During this feud, Diesel suffered a legitimate elbow injury but was able to compete at King of the Ring. To explain the injury, the footage was shown on the May 29 edition of Raw of Sid performing a Chokeslam and Powerbomb onto Diesel at In Your House 1. Because of Diesel's injury, this storyline never got any further buildup until the actual pay-per-view.

The other main feud heading into King of the Ring was between Jerry Lawler and Bret Hart, which began two years earlier at the 1993 King of the Ring. At the previous pay-per-view, In Your House 1, Lawler defeated Hart after outside interference from Hakushi and his manager Shinja. On the May 22 edition of Raw, Hart confronted Lawler at the announce table and demanded a rematch. Lawler accepted and added a stipulation that the loser must kiss the winner's feet. To prepare for this, Lawler spent the next few weeks walking around stables barefoot in horse manure and not washing his feet at all until after he beats Hart. On the June 10 edition of Superstars, Lawler defeated Aldo Montoya and then forced him to kiss his foot.

== Reception ==
The event has received universally negative reviews from critics.

In 2015, Kevin Pantoja of 411Mania gave the event a rating of 1.0 [Extremely Horrendous], stating, "In the running for the worst WWF Pay-Per-View in history. I’ve yet to review one worse, though I can recall a worse WCW one. Nothing on this show is redeemable. The nonsensical booking, the boring matches, and the painfully boring main event all were horrible. Everyone in attendance deserved a refund and to have the show wiped from their memory."

In 2021, John Canton of TJR Wrestling gave the event a rating of 3/10, stating, "This is one of the worst PPVs in WWE history. Rating it 3 out of 10 might be generous by me. That’s how bad it is. Choosing Mabel to win King of the Ring meant two bad matches from him while the great Shawn Michaels only got to wrestle once. Meanwhile, there was a lot of Savio Vega and I don’t know if people were clamoring for him. The show was also hurt by the lack of a WWE Title match since Diesel only wrestled in a tag team match that didn’t feel like that big of a deal."

In 2020, Paul Matthews of Classic Wrestling Review described the event as the "most disappointing [PPV] of all-time," stating, "Was this the worst PPV of all-time? It is certainly near the bottom. I would call it the most disappointing one of all time. They could have put together a better tournament with their roster. Vince chose to push one of the worst choices imaginable. To not sacrifice anyone too big for that experiment, he had to fill the brackets with lesser stars. He shot himself in the foot and this show suffered for it. It’s unfortunate Diesel couldn’t wrestle a one-on-one match in his condition. However, they could have booked a better main event. This PPV is the epitome of the bad booking in ’95."

== Aftermath ==
Following his victory, Mabel was given a major push as a main eventer, culminating in a match with Diesel at SummerSlam for the WWF Championship, which Mabel lost. Mabel would continue to feud with Diesel after this event, as well as continue his feuds stemming from the KOTR tournament (such as The Undertaker). He also briefly feuded with Yokozuna, with whom he had allied throughout his feud with Diesel.

After being humiliated by Bret Hart, Jerry Lawler decided to recruit some help in the form of his dentist, Isaac Yankem, D.D.S., who would lose to Hart by disqualification at SummerSlam. The feud would finally end when Hart defeated Yankem in a steel cage match on the October 16 edition of Raw, in which Lawler was placed in a shark cage above the ring for trying to interfere.

Because the event was held in Philadelphia, many familiar faces from the ECW Arena were present. During the "King of the Ring" final between Mabel, and Savio Vega, these fans began chanting "ECW, ECW" in protest at what they were watching unfold in the ring. This public support of ECW gained the attention of Vince McMahon, and he later booked small invasion-type angles involving the ECW promotion in 1996 and 1997 with the cooperation of Paul Heyman.

== Results ==
| No. | Results | Stipulations | Times |
|---|---|---|---|
| 1^{S} | Savio Vega (with Razor Ramon) defeated Irwin R. Schyster (with Ted DiBiase) | King of the Ring qualifying match | 5:01 |
| 2 | Savio Vega (with Razor Ramon) defeated Yokozuna (with Mr. Fuji and Jim Cornette) by countout | King of the Ring quarter-final match | 8:24 |
| 3 | The Roadie (with Jeff Jarrett) defeated Bob Holly | King of the Ring quarter-final match | 7:11 |
| 4 | Shawn Michaels vs. Kama (with Ted DiBiase) ended in a time-limit draw | King of the Ring quarter-final match | 15:00 |
| 5 | Mabel (with Mo) defeated The Undertaker (with Paul Bearer) | King of the Ring quarter-final match | 10:44 |
| 6 | Savio Vega (with Razor Ramon) defeated The Roadie (with Jeff Jarrett) | King of the Ring semi-final match | 6:36 |
| 7 | Bret Hart defeated Jerry Lawler | Kiss my Foot match | 9:20 |
| 8 | Mabel (with Mo) defeated Savio Vega | King of the Ring final match | 8:32 |
| 9 | Diesel and Bam Bam Bigelow defeated Tatanka and Sycho Sid (with Ted DiBiase) | Tag team match | 17:35 |
S / – the match was broadcast prior to the pay-per-view on Sunday Night Slam

=== Tournament brackets ===
The tournament took place between May 14 and June 25, 1995. The tournament brackets were:

First Round (TV)
Adam Bomb | 1:54
Mabel | Pin
Jeff Jarrett | 8:55
The Undertaker | Pin
Kama | Pin
Duke Droese | 2:51
King Kong Bundy | 6:01
Shawn Michaels | Pin
Bob Holly | Pin
Mantaur | 5:29
The Roadie | Pin
Doink the Clown | 5:04
Lex Luger | 8:07
Yokozuna^{1} | CO
Razor Ramon^{2} | Pin
Jacob Blu | 7:46

Quarterfinals (PPV)
Mabel | Pin
The Undertaker | 10:44
Kama | Draw
Shawn Michaels | 15:00
Bob Holly | 7:30
The Roadie | Pin
Yokozuna | 8:24
Savio Vega | CO

Semifinals (PPV)
Mabel
BYE
The Roadie | 6:36
Savio Vega | Pin

Final (PPV)
Mabel | Pin
Savio Vega | 8:32

1. Owen Hart and Davey Boy Smith wrestled to a 15:00 Time Limit Draw on WWF Monday Night Raw on June 5, 1995 in a King of the Ring Qualifying Match. Yokozuna would defeat Luger the next week on Raw for the final slot in the King of the Ring Tournament.

2. Savio Vega defeated Irwin R. Schyster in a match prior to the pay-per-view, to fill the vacancy left due to Razor Ramon's rib injury suffered on June 9 in Uniondale, New York in a ladder match against Jeff Jarrett. Ramon had qualified on May 16 in Danbury, Connecticut over Jacob Blu.
