= SummerSlam (1995) =

World Wrestling Federation pay-per-view event

- Promotional poster featuring Diesel
- Promotion: World Wrestling Federation
- Date: August 27, 1995
- City: Pittsburgh, Pennsylvania
- Venue: Civic Arena
- Attendance: 18,062
- Buy rate: 205,000
- Tagline: Face the Heat

Pay-per-view chronology
← Previous; In Your House 2	Next → In Your House 3

SummerSlam chronology
← Previous; 1994	Next → 1996

The 1995 SummerSlam was a professional wrestling pay-per-view (PPV) event produced by the World Wrestling Federation (WWF, renamed WWE in 2002). It was the eighth annual SummerSlam and took place on Sunday, August 27, 1995, at the Civic Arena in Pittsburgh, Pennsylvania. This was the first SummerSlam to broadcast live on a Sunday as all prior events were held on a Monday, except the 1992 event, which took place on a Saturday but aired on tape delay the following Monday. SummerSlam remained on Sunday until 2021 when it moved to Saturday before the event expanded to a two-night broadcast on Saturday and Sunday beginning in 2025.

A total of nine matches were contested at the event. The main event was for the WWF Championship between Diesel and King Mabel. Diesel retained the championship, pinning Mabel after performing a clothesline off the second rope. There were three matches on the undercard that had more build-up than other matches: The Undertaker defeated Kama in a Casket match; Bret Hart defeated Isaac Yankem by disqualification after Yankem and Jerry Lawler attacked Hart while Hart was in the "hangman" position; and the third match that had significant build-up was Shawn Michaels versus Razor Ramon in a feud for the WWF Intercontinental Championship where the two faced off in a Ladder match with Michaels retaining the title. Hunter Hearst Helmsley (later known as Triple H) made his official WWF pay-per-view debut (although he had competed in dark matches before the live broadcasts of In Your House 1 and 2) where he defeated Bob Holly.

The pay-per-view received a 0.9 buyrate, equivalent to approximately 205,000 buys in 1995 (1.0 equated to roughly 230,000 homes in the domestic market that year). Although this was up on the budget for the In Your House 2 pay-per-view, which took place the previous month, the budget was down on the 1994 SummerSlam event, which received a 1.3 buyrate.

== Production ==
=== Background ===
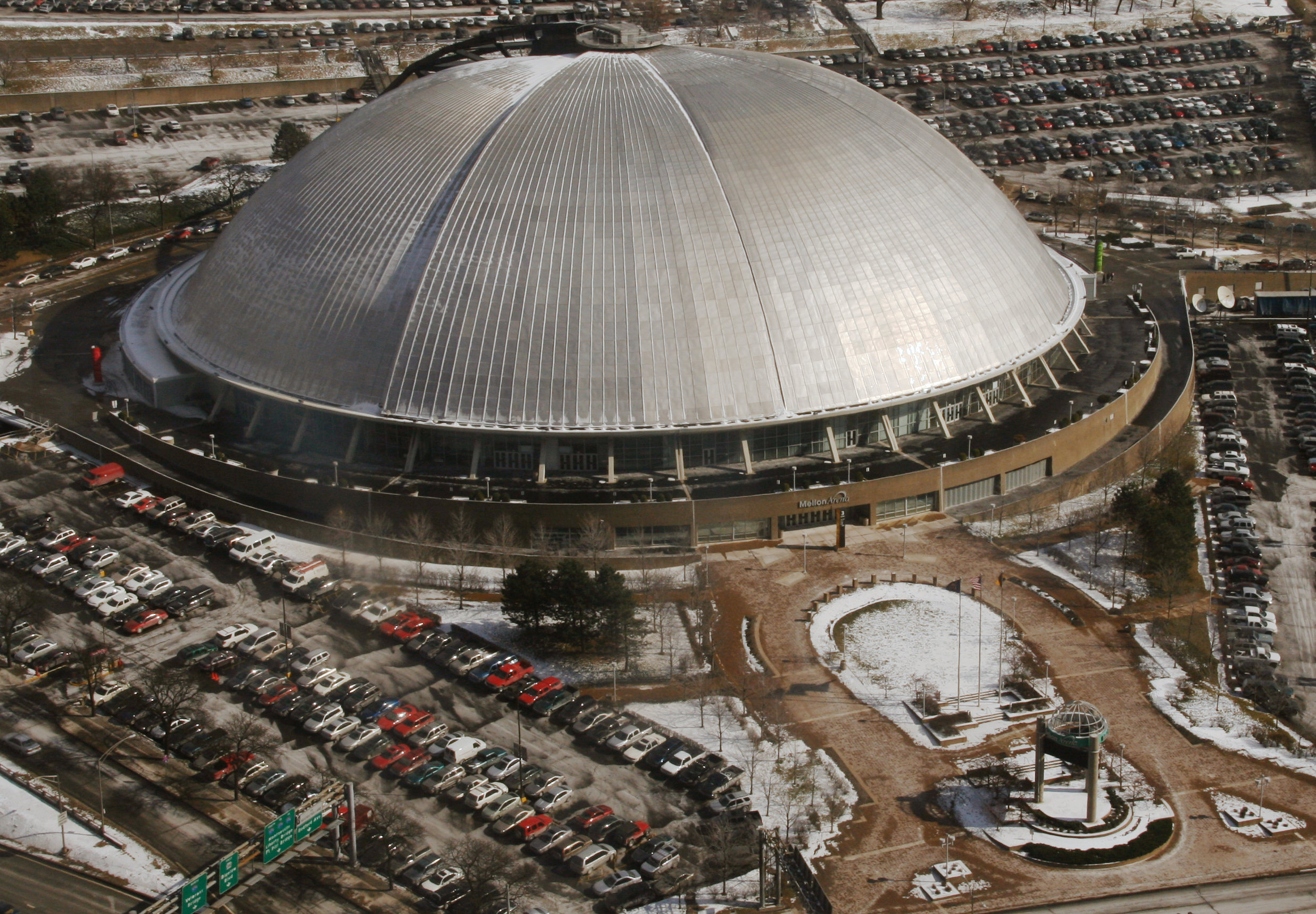
The eighth annual SummerSlam was held at the Civic Arena in Pittsburgh, Pennsylvania.

SummerSlam is an annual professional wrestling pay-per-view (PPV) event produced every August by the World Wrestling Federation (WWF, renamed WWE in 2002) since 1988. Dubbed "The Biggest Party of the Summer", it is one of the promotion's original four PPVs, along with WrestleMania, Royal Rumble, and Survivor Series, referred to as the "Big Four", and was considered one of the "Big Five" PPVs with the addition of King of the Ring in 1993. It has since become considered the WWF's second biggest event of the year behind WrestleMania. The eighth SummerSlam was scheduled to be held on Sunday, August 27, 1995, at the Civic Arena in Pittsburgh, Pennsylvania. This was the first SummerSlam to broadcast live on a Sunday as all prior events were held on a Monday, except the 1992 event, which took place on a Saturday but aired on tape delay the following Monday.

=== Storylines ===
The most prominent feud heading into the event was between WWF Champion Diesel and King of the Ring, King Mabel (accompanied by his manager and tag team partner, Sir Mo). During Diesel's Lumberjack match with Sycho Sid at In Your House 2, King Mabel (who was one of the lumberjacks) intervened, tossing Diesel into the ring steps. Despite Mabel's interference, Diesel kept the title, pinning Sid after a big boot. On the August 7 episode of Monday Night Raw, Diesel faced Sir Mo. Mabel appeared at ringside, distracting Diesel. Moments later, Shawn Michaels came ringside to support Diesel. After Diesel won the match, Mabel attacked him with a clothesline and a leg drop. Mabel then attacked Michaels. On the last Raw before SummerSlam, commentator Vince McMahon interviewed Diesel about his SummerSlam title defense. Halfway through the interview, Davey Boy Smith appeared and suggested he and Diesel team for a match against Men on a Mission (Mabel and Mo). During the match, Smith turned on Diesel and sided with Men on a Mission, leading to a three-on-one assault on the champion.

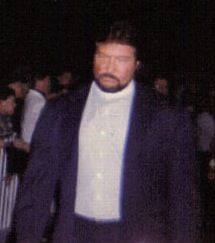
Ted DiBiase (pictured), Kama's manager during his feud with The Undertaker

The feud between The Undertaker and Kama (a member of Ted Dibiase's Million Dollar Corporation) began at WrestleMania XI. The Undertaker's manager was Paul Bearer, and Kama's manager was Ted DiBiase. Undertaker was portrayed as the face, and Kama as the heel. At WrestleMania XI, during Undertaker's match with King Kong Bundy, Kama ran out to the ring, attacked Bearer, and stole the urn (an object which, in storylines, gives The Undertaker supernatural power) for DiBiase. Immediately afterward, Kama declared (in an interview with Jim Ross) his intention to melt down the urn. The urn was revealed to have become a gold necklace, first worn by Kama prior to his match with Scott Taylor on the April 10 episode of Raw. On the April 23 episode of Action Zone, The Undertaker defeated Sycho Sid, another member of The Million Dollar Corporation. On the May 7 episode of Wrestling Challenge, a black wreath was left at ringside for Kama. Kama attacked the wreath and, after defeating Buck Zumhofe, stuffed part of it into Zumhofe's mouth. Another black wreath was left at ringside for Kama on the June 12 Raw. After defeating jobber David Haskins, Kama again attacked the wreath, only to realize it was a mannequin. Both The Undertaker and Kama participated in the 1995 King of the Ring tournament. On the pay-per-view, a black wreath was ringside for the whole of Kama's quarterfinal match with Shawn Michaels, which ended in a draw. Toward the end of The Undertaker's quarterfinal contest with Mabel, Undertaker was thrown into the referee. While the referee was down, Kama interfered by kicking Undertaker in the face. Mabel followed up with a leg drop, pinning Undertaker to win the match. The Undertaker chased Kama backstage after the bout. The two continued to wrestle together in matches at house shows, with the two facing each other in preparation for their SummerSlam bout. Wreaths continued to be left ringside during Kama's matches, and Kama continued to attack them. On the August 21, 1995 Raw, (storyline) WWF president Gorilla Monsoon announced the match between Undertaker and Kama would be a casket match.

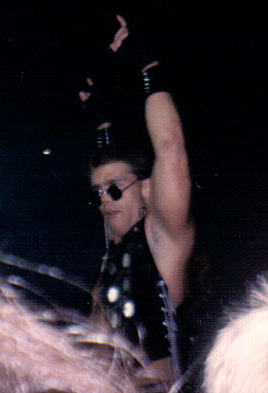
Shawn Michaels (pictured) defended the WWF Intercontinental Championship against Razor Ramon at SummerSlam 1995

An undercard feud involved Shawn Michaels and the WWF Intercontinental Championship. Michaels had won the title by pinning Jeff Jarrett at In Your House 2. At that event, Michaels was also a "lumberjack" in the WWF Title match between Diesel and Sycho Sid. He performed a double axe handle off the top rope onto Sid on the outside of the ring, helping Diesel retain the title. A few months prior, Sid had powerbombed Michaels three times, after Shawn blamed Sid for costing him the WWF World Heavyweight Title at WrestleMania XI sidelining him for six weeks with injuries. On the July 24 Raw, Sid vowed revenge on Michaels. That night, commentator Jerry Lawler stated his desire for a shot at Michaels' title. A match between Sid and Michaels was scheduled for SummerSlam. However, the match was suddenly scrapped soon after. Michaels would now defend the Intercontinental Championship in a ladder match against Razor Ramon, despite a lack of any onscreen buildup. On the August 7 Raw, Michaels attempted to attack Lawler, but was restrained by officials. Michaels wrestled Lawler on the August 14 Raw. Sid attempted to interfere in the match with a clothesline, but Michaels ducked and hit Sid with a superkick. Sid and Lawler regained the upper hand, and Sid chokeslammed Michaels. Razor Ramon ran in and assisted Michaels in clearing the ring of his attackers. Michaels and Razor then had a staredown, which led to a brawl. Razor came out on top. Despite being removed from SummerSlam, Sid was granted a future title shot, against whoever would be champion on the September 11 episode of Raw. During this feud, Diesel sided with Shawn Michaels while Bret Hart sided with Razor Ramon.

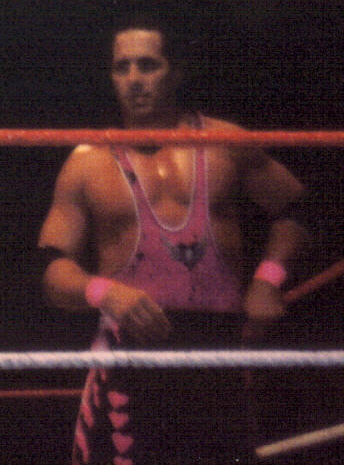
Bret Hart (pictured), who faced Isaac Yankem at SummerSlam 1995

Bret Hart had been feuding with Jerry Lawler for two years when they met at King of the Ring. Hart won the match and, per the stipulation, Lawler was forced to kiss Hart's feet, despite Hakushi's attempt to stop it. The following night on Raw, a vignette aired, showing Lawler visiting his dentist, Isaac Yankem, D.D.S., to have his teeth cleaned of foot smell. Yankem revealed to Lawler he used to be a professional wrestler. This began a storyline of Lawler attempting to avenge his loss to Hart. Over the following weeks, more vignettes from Yankem's office aired. They showed him treating his patients, while Lawler asked them which wrestlers they liked and disliked. On the July 24 Raw, Hart beat Hakushi. After the bout, Hart assaulted and piledrove Hakushi's manager, Shinja. Yankem and Hart did not have any direct interaction before their SummerSlam match.

The WWF Women's Championship feud started on the April 3 episode of Raw. Moments after winning the title from Bull Nakano, Alundra Blayze was attacked by an unknown woman (later introduced as Bertha Faye). The attack sidelined Blayze with a broken nose. Faye, managed by Harvey Whippleman, had her debut match on the April 24 Raw, squashing La Pantera Serena. Blayze made her Raw return on May 29, stating she was cleared to wrestle in an interview with Vince McMahon. Faye and Whippleman responded with their own interview on the June 3 Superstars of Wrestling. Their SummerSlam match was announced on the August 7 episode of Raw.

== Event ==
Other on-screen personnel
Role	Name
English commentators	Vince McMahon
English commentators	Jerry Lawler (First 7 matches)
English commentators	Dok Hendrix (Last 2 matches)
Spanish commentators	Carlos Cabrera
Spanish commentators	Hugo Savinovich
Interviewers	Dean Douglas
Interviewers	Dok Hendrix
Interviewers	Todd Pettengill
Interviewers	Jim Ross
Ring announcer	Manny Garcia
Referees	Mike Chioda
Referees	Jack Doan
Referees	Earl Hebner
Referees	Tim White

The first match to air was between Hakushi, and The 1–2–3 Kid. Hakushi got the early advantage after hitting a tilt-a-whirl backbreaker. Both wrestlers performed multiple high spots. Late on, The Kid avoided a Diving headbutt and followed with a series of offensive moves. The Kid attempted to perform his finisher, a spinning crescent kick, but Hakushi countered it into the Nenbutsu Bomb and pinned him.

Hunter Hearst Helmsley faced Bob Holly in the second match. This was Helmsley's actual WWF pay-per-view wrestling debut (although he competed in dark matches before at In Your House 1 and 2. Toward the end of the bout, Holly gained the upper hand with a series of dropkicks. He attempted to toss Helmsley into the corner, but Helmsley reversed it, then hit his Pedigree finisher and made the pin .

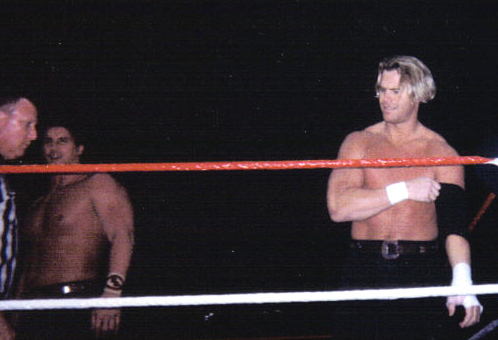
The Smoking Gunns (Bart Gunn and Billy Gunn) who faced The Blu Brothers (Jacob Blu and Eli Blu) at SummerSlam 1995

A tag team match was next. The Smoking Gunns (Bart Gunn and Billy Gunn) faced The Blu Brothers (Jacob Blu and Eli Blu), with their manager Uncle Zebekiah at ringside. The Blu Brothers held the advantage for the majority of the match, making quick tags to work over Billy. Billy eventually made the hot tag to Bart, who gained the immediate advantage but was booted in the face by Jacob. Bart regained the advantage, pushing Jacob into Eli. The Gunns followed up with their Sidewinder finisher for the pin.

The next match was between Barry Horowitz and Skip (managed by Sunny). Horowitz had defeated Skip in several matches shortly before SummerSlam. This match was both competitor and Sunny's first appearance on a WWF pay-per-view. Horowitz took control early and kept it for much of the match. Multiple illegal interferences from Sunny momentarily gave Skip the upper hand. Eventually, Hakushi came to ringside. He distracted Skip long enough for Horowitz to score a roll-up pinfall and win the match.

The following matchup was for the WWF Women's Championship. Bertha Faye (managed by Harvey Whippleman) challenged Alundra Blayze. Momentum went back and forth several times. Eventually, Faye was able to powerbomb Blayze and pin her, winning the Women's Championship.

Next was the casket match between Kama (with manager Ted DiBiase) and The Undertaker (with manager Paul Bearer). The Undertaker took the early lead. Kama fought his way out of the casket several times and reversed the momentum with a leaping fist from the top rope. Kama then spent most of the match on the offensive. At one point, the Undertaker clotheslined Kama and both men went over the top rope into the casket and the lid shut but the match continued until a winner was decided. The Undertaker eventually ducked a clothesline and choke slammed, then Tombstone Pile-driver, and then rolled Kama into the casket, closed the lid, and was declared the winner.

The next match was between Isaac Yankem, DDS and Bret Hart. This was Yankem's (later Kane's) debut and first WWF pay-per-view appearance. Yankem used several power moves to gain an early advantage against Hart. A missed charge to the turnbuckle flipped the momentum into Hart's favor. Yankem was eventually able to catch Hart midair and slam him down upon the top rope. After some time Yankem fell out of the ring. Hart took a running dive on top of him and then slammed his head into the steps. Hart applied the sharpshooter but Yankem was able to grab the ropes to break the hold. Jerry Lawler left his broadcast position to distract Hart, permitting Yankem to get the upper hand, and slammed Hart into the stairs. However, Hart was able to throw Yankem from the top rope as he attempted a high-risk maneuver. Additional interference from Lawler eventually led to a disqualification for Yankem. However, Hart ended with his head twisted in the ropes and Lawler and Yankem pulling on his feet to choke him.

The penultimate match of the night was a Ladder match between Razor Ramon and Shawn Michaels for the WWF Intercontinental Championship. This was a rematch from their highly-rated ladder match at WrestleMania X. By this point in time, Michaels had become a fan favorite, and so this was a rare matchup between two face superstars. In the midst of some back and forth, both contenders went for their finishing moves, but both times they were avoided. Razor was able to go out and retrieve the ladder, but, while trying to climb it, Michaels was able to kick him off. The match went back and forth, with both wrestlers climbing the ladder but being knocked off. Ramon began a strategy of attacking and injuring Michaels' left leg, twisting it in the ladder and dropping his boot and the ladder on it many times. Michaels eventually took advantage with a suplex off the ladder and then several aerial attacks from the ladder. However, when Michaels went for a splash from the very top of the ladder, Ramon moved out of the way. Eventually, Ramon was able to grab Michaels as he was climbing the ladder and convert it into a Razor's Edge. Razor was unable to capitalize, and when he went for a second Razor's Edge Michaels was able to backtoss him out of the ring. Michaels was then able to climb the ladder and take down the belt, winning the match. Ramon came back in, presented Michaels with the belt, and shook his hand.

The final match was between King Mabel (with Sir Mo) and Diesel for the WWF Championship. King Mabel took the advantage early. At one point Mabel sit-splashed onto Diesel's back, injuring him in reality. Eventually, the referee was knocked down. Sir Mo and King Mabel then double-teamed Diesel. Lex Luger came out from the backstage to help but ended up getting hit by Diesel in the fray and knocked back out. Eventually, Luger was able to remove Sir Mo from the match. Diesel was able to win with a rare aerial attack of a clothesline off the second rope.

== Aftermath ==
The night after SummerSlam they taped the September 9th episode of Superstars followed by the September 11th season premiere of Raw, featuring the debut of the “Raw on the roof” opening video, as well as the September 18th episode of Raw.

Lex Luger made his last appearance on WWF television in the main event of SummerSlam (preventing Sir Mo from further interfering), and that led to a six-man tag team dark match the following night with Sir Mo, Mabel, and Sid losing to Lex, Shawn Michaels & The Undertaker. After working several WWF house shows over the next few days, Luger would rejoin World Championship Wrestling on September 4th during the debut episode of Monday Nitro.

Diesel defended the WWF Championship against Owen Hart, Yokozuna, and Davey Boy Smith, before losing it to Bret Hart at Survivor Series.

The Undertaker's feud with the Million Dollar Corporation ended, and he began to feud with King Mabel.

Bret Hart continued to feud with Jerry Lawler and Isaac Yankem until the October 16, 1995 episode of Monday Night Raw, where Hart defeated Yankem in a steel cage match.

== Results ==
No.	Results	Stipulations	Times
1	Hakushi defeated The 1–2–3 Kid	Singles match	9:27
2	Hunter Hearst Helmsley defeated Bob Holly	Singles match	7:10
3	The Smoking Gunns (Billy and Bart) defeated The Blu Brothers (Jacob and Eli) (with Uncle Zebekiah)	Tag team match	6:09
4	Barry Horowitz defeated Skip (with Sunny)	Singles match	11:21
5	Bertha Faye (with Harvey Wippleman) defeated Alundra Blayze (c)	Singles match for the WWF Women's Championship	4:14
6	The Undertaker (with Paul Bearer) defeated Kama (with Ted DiBiase) by putting Kama in the casket with the lid completely shut	Casket match	16:26
7	Bret Hart defeated Isaac Yankem, DDS by disqualification	Singles match	16:07
8	Shawn Michaels (c) defeated Razor Ramon by retrieving the championship belt	Ladder match for the WWF Intercontinental Championship	25:01
9	Diesel (c) defeated King Mabel (with Sir Mo)	Singles match for the WWF Championship	9:14
(c) / – the champion(s) heading into the match
