= Pettingell =

Pettingell is a surname. Notable people with the surname include:

- Frank Pettingell (1891–1966), English actor
- William Pettingell (1914–1987), Australian businessman

== See also ==
- Pettingill
