= WWF Raw (1994 video game) =

1994 video game

- Promotional flyer depicting WWF superstars The Undertaker, Yokozuna, Lex Luger, Razor Ramon, Bret "Hitman" Hart, Diesel, Luna Vachon, Owen Hart and Doink the Clown behind the original WWF Raw logo.
- Developers: Sculptured Software; Realtime Associates Seattle (Handheld versions)
- Publisher: Acclaim Entertainment (Note: Released under the LJN brand name on Nintendo systems.)
- Platforms: Super Nintendo Entertainment System; 32X; Sega Genesis; Game Boy; Game Gear
- Release: November 1994: Super NES; NA: November 1994; EU: 1994 Genesis; NA: November 1994; EU: 1994 Game Boy; NA: November 1994; EU: 1994 Game Gear; NA: November 1994; EU: 1994 32X; NA: 1995
- Genres: Sports-based fighting
- Modes: Single-player, multiplayer

WWF Raw is a professional wrestling video game based on the television show of the same name produced by the World Wrestling Federation (WWF), released for the SNES, 32X, Mega Drive/Genesis, Game Boy, and Game Gear in late 1994 and early 1995 by Acclaim Entertainment. It is the sequel to the WWF Royal Rumble game that was released in 1993, and is the final part of LJN's 16-bit WWF trilogy. Players can play either One-on-One, Tag Team, Bedlam, Survivor Series, Royal Rumble, or a Raw Endurance Match. Unlike its predecessor, WWF RAW is multitap compatible.

WWF RAW introduces differences between the characters in that they not only have their own signature moves, but differing move sets altogether (including new over-the-top "mega moves"). The game adds many moves not seen in the previous games, such as a DDT, a fallaway slam, and various types of suplexes. Additionally, wrestlers differ in attributes of speed, strength, stamina, and weight.

The game itself is arcade-like and involves a "tug-of-war" system in which, when the wrestlers lock-up, a meter appears above them and players must repeatedly press buttons to pull the energy away from the opponent's side to theirs. With more energy, they can perform moves with greater impact. Once an opponent's energy is low enough, a player can perform a wrestler's unique signature move.

== Gameplay ==
=== Match types ===
Luna Vachon takes on Yokozuna in an Intergender match (Super NES version).

General rules:

- In a Brawl mode the only way to win is by deflating the opponents' energy bars to zero, and there are no referees or any counts.
- When the One Fall option is enabled, characters cannot perform chokes and eye gouges. But if the referee gets knocked down, these attacks will be enabled until he recovers. However, the match can not end until the referee is able to count pin attempts or ring outs. If the referee is knocked down too many times, he will walk out of the ring. The match will then continue under Brawl rules.
  - Applying certain holds to opponents which have no stamina will result in them giving up. This will not work in the Royal Rumble match.

Types:

- In a One-on-One singles match, two wrestlers (one player versus the computer or two players) square off for a face-to-face bout. One Fall, Brawl, and Tournament variations are available. One Fall matches feature an in-ring referee and are contested under standard rules. Victory is achieved by a 3-count pinfall or a count-out if a wrestler stays outside of the ring for a full ten-count. In a Brawl, however, the referee is absent. This allows unlimited time outside the ring and illegal moves such as eye raking and choking are allowed at all times. The Brawl match doesn't require a pinfall to win; instead, the first player to be entirely drained of their stamina submits in defeat. In a Tournament, a player must battle through the entire roster in a series of One Fall matches to win the championship belt.
- A Tag Team match is made up of two teams of two wrestlers (if two players are involved, they can choose to either control opposite teams or be on the same team against the computer). Whenever one wrestler gets tired, they can tag in their partner. A wrestler on the apron can grab an opponent if they get close to the ropes, allowing their partner to attack them. One Fall, Brawl, and Tournament configurations are available. In a standard tag team match, if an illegal wrestler is in the ring for a full 10-count, his/her team will be disqualified. Otherwise, the same rules for the singles One Fall and Brawl matches apply to tag team matches. In the tag team Tournament mode, either one player or two cooperative players will choose two wrestlers to form a team and then must defeat the remaining wrestlers in a series of One Fall tag team matches to win the tag team championship.
- A Survivor Series match is also similar to a Tag Team match. Instead of only 2 members on each team, a team can consist of up to four wrestlers. It is also elimination style, in which a team is only victorious when all the opponents' teammates have been eliminated by pinfall, submission, countout, or disqualification. Only one partner can appear on the apron at one time, but the player can change outside partners via a button command.
- The Royal Rumble match begins with two wrestlers, and more adversaries enter until six wrestlers are in the ring. Additional wrestlers enter as others are eliminated. There are no holds barred and elimination occurs when a wrestler is thrown out of the ring. A wrestler must be worn down before they can be thrown out, unless they're caught running with a hip toss or back body drop, or knocked off the top turnbuckle. In most cases, a Mega Move will instantly eliminate an opponent if they connect. The last wrestler remaining in the ring after all twelve have entered wins the match. At the end of a Royal Rumble, score rankings are shown giving a wrestler's total time in the ring along with a list of opponents they eliminated.
- A Bedlam tag team is a mix between a Tornado tag team match, in which both team members are allowed in the ring at the same time, and an elimination tag team matches, in which all team members must be beaten and not just one.
- A Raw Endurance match is a mix between a Survivor Series and a Bedlam. The player picks his first wrestler, then up to five more partners. The choosing of partners is optional, meaning a player can choose to go in with as much as a 6-on-1 handicap. The first team to eliminate all the members of the other team wins the match.

=== Finishing & Mega Moves ===
Every wrestler has a unique move based on their real-life finishing move. They all need to be performed in specific positions when the targeted opponent is low on stamina. They all use exactly the same button combination, and most characters taunt if the move was successful. Shawn Michaels' finishing move is the "Catapult Suplex", a version of his then finishing move the "Teardrop Suplex". Both Bret Hart and Owen Hart use the "Sharpshooter", which is a hold. If the Sharpshooter causes the opponent's health to deplete fully, then they will submit. The correct move positions are noted in the game's instruction manual.

All versions of the game apart from the handheld versions also have Mega Moves. These are greatly exaggerated moves which cause the most damage. In most cases, they will knock an opponent out of the ring. If this happens in a Royal Rumble, then the opponent is eliminated. The player can execute these moves using a character specific button combination. Most of them are easy to avoid due to their long set-up animations. For example, both, Lex Luger and The Undertaker swing their arms in a circular motion before punching the opponent. As they are winding up their arms, the opponent has time to walk away from the target area. Other moves cannot be countered, like Diesel's literal throw towards the ceiling.

== Rosters ==
Wrestler	SNES/Genesis	Sega 32X	Game Gear	Game Boy
1-2-3 Kid	Yes	Yes	No	No
Bam Bam Bigelow	Yes	Yes	Yes	No
Bret Hart	Yes	Yes	Yes	Yes
Crush	No	No	Yes	No
Diesel	Yes	Yes	Yes	Yes
Doink the Clown	Yes	Yes	No	Yes
Kwang	No	Yes	No	No
Lex Luger	Yes	Yes	Yes	Yes
Luna Vachon	Yes	Yes	No	No
Owen Hart	Yes	Yes	No	No
Randy Savage	No	No	Yes	No
Razor Ramon	Yes	Yes	Yes	Yes
Shawn Michaels	Yes	Yes	Yes	Yes
The Undertaker	Yes	Yes	Yes	Yes
Yokozuna	Yes	Yes	Yes	Yes

- Kwang is only accessible in the Sega 32X version via a cheat code. The Super NES and Sega Genesis rosters are identical.

== Version differences ==
- The 32X version features Kwang as a hidden wrestler; he does not have his own moves, instead using Diesel's finisher, Bam Bam Bigelow's finisher, and Doink's mega move. This version also features extra moves and outside weapons. The commentators also alternate between Vince McMahon/Jerry "The King" Lawler and Gorilla Monsoon/Stephanie Wiand. There are also alternating referees.
- The handheld ports feature fewer wrestlers and do not include Bedlam, Royal Rumble, or Raw Endurance match types. Additionally, wrestlers share the same move set except for their signature moves, and there are no mega moves.
- The handheld versions run much slower.
- The Game Gear port features two exclusive wrestlers, "Macho Man" Randy Savage and Crush.

== Reception ==
Reception

Review scores
Publication	Score
Electronic Gaming Monthly	5.75/10
Famitsu	19/40
Next Generation	3/5

On release, Famitsu magazine scored the Mega Drive version of the game a 19 out of 40. Quick-Draw McGraw of GamePro gave it a positive review, praising the selection of fighters, variety of moves, lack of slowdown, the sound effects, and the many skill settings. He did, however, criticize the fact that all the wrestlers are rendered at the same height, even ones who have drastic height differences in real life.

Next Generation gave the SNES version of the game three stars out of five and wrote that "there are still many aspects of pro wrestling that none of the WWF games have yet to cover, so why not go after those?" Quick-Draw McGraw of GamePro was even more laudatory towards the SNES version, remarking that the controls are more precise and the graphics more detailed than those of the Genesis/Mega Drive version.

GamePro's Air Hendrix dismissed the 32X version, saying it is identical to the Genesis version aside from some minor graphical improvements. The two sports reviewers of Electronic Gaming Monthly agreed, and further criticized that the control is poor and the opponent AI is overly hard to beat on all but the easiest difficulty setting. They scored it a 5.75 out of 10. Next Generation reviewed the 32X version of the game, rating it two stars out of five.

== See also ==
- List of licensed wrestling video games
- List of fighting games
