= WWF Mania =

- Created by: Vince McMahon
- Starring: WWF roster
- Country of origin: United States

Original release
- Network: USA Network
- Release: January 9, 1993 – September 14, 1996

WWF Mania, or simply Mania, is a professional wrestling television program that was produced by the World Wrestling Federation (WWF). It aired on Saturday mornings on the USA Network between 1993 and 1996 and summarized the weekly events in WWF programming. In its earlier years, Mania usually featured a show exclusive wrestling match. For roughly the first year of its run, Mania also took viewer calls live and only viewers in the Eastern and Central time zones could participate in that portion of the show.

== History ==
Mania was originally hosted by Todd Pettengill, who was later joined by "Macho Man" Randy Savage from 1993 to 1994. From December 1994 to July 1995 Pettengill was joined by Stephanie Wiand. For feature matches (matches exclusive to Mania), Sean Mooney and Lord Alfred Hayes were the broadcasters, until Mooney left in the Spring of 1993, which led to Hayes being phased out from the broadcast booth. From then on Mania used various other broadcasters for the weekly exclusive match, including Jim Ross and Gorilla Monsoon. The 1994 Slammy Awards took place on an episode of WWF Mania.

In September 1996, Mania was rebranded as WWF Blast-Off for the Superstation WGN, while Mania was then discontinued and later replaced with WWF LiveWire.

In the United Kingdom, Mania aired on Friday nights and Saturdays at noon on Sky One. During this airing, Mania served as a summary show exclusively for Monday Night Raw until Raw premiered in the United Kingdom in 1995 on Sky Sports.

In the United Kingdom WWF Mania was released on VHS in 1994 and was hosted by Johnny Polo. It featured a Ten-Man Tag Team match with I.R.S., Jeff Jarrett, Rick Martel, and The Headshrinkers vs. Tatanka, 1-2-3 Kid, Bob Holly, and The Smoking Gunns.
