= Savio Vega =

Puerto Rican professional wrestler (born 1964)

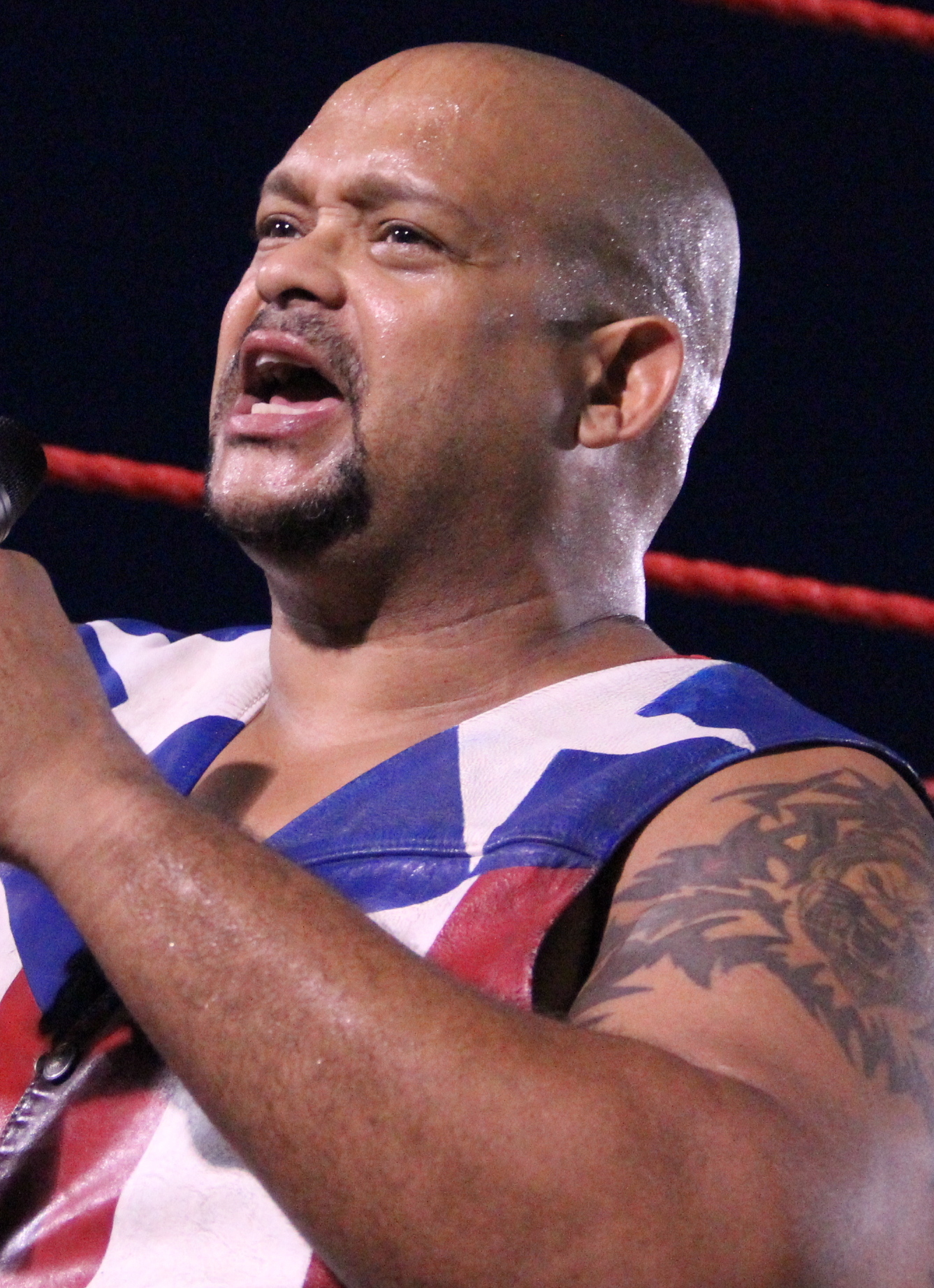
- Vega in 2013

Personal information
- Born: Juan Rivera; August 10, 1964 (age 61) Vega Alta, Puerto Rico

Professional wrestling career
- Ring name(s): The Caribbean Kid; El Corsario; El Corsario I Hombre Que Ellos Llaman TNT; Hombre Dinamita; Kwang; Savio Vega; TNT
- Billed height: 5 ft 11 in (180 cm)
- Billed weight: 260 lb (118 kg)
- Billed from: Puerto Rico; The Orient, Japan (as Kwang); The South Bronx (while leading the Boricuas)
- Debut: 1985
- Retired: 2024

Juan Rivera (born August 10, 1964) is a retired Puerto Rican professional wrestler. He is signed to WWE as a producer via its sister promotion Lucha Libre AAA Worldwide.

He is known for his work in the World Wrestling Council, where he won the WWC Universal Heavyweight Championship three times and the WWC Puerto Rico Heavyweight Championship three times. During the 1990s, he worked for the World Wrestling Federation (WWF), initially under the masked, villainous and venom-spewing Kwang gimmick. He later portrayed Savio Vega, the eventual leader of a Puerto Rican stable, Los Boricuas.

After leaving the WWF in 1999, Rivera returned to Puerto Rico and joined Víctor Quiñones' promotion, the International Wrestling Association, where he was a long-time general manager and won five titles, including the IWA Undisputed World Heavyweight Championship. In 2011, he was featured in the first interpromotional angle between IWA and WWC.

== Professional wrestling career ==
=== Early years ===
Rivera was born and raised in Vega Alta, Puerto Rico. He was connected to the wrestling business while working as a security guard at World Wrestling Council live shows. After graduating from high school, he began his professional wrestling career working on independent wrestling shows in 1985.

=== Mid-South Wrestling (1985) ===
He made his Mid-South Wrestling debut on August 14, 1985, as Skandor Akbar's newest client, the masked villainous wrestler "El Corsario" by defeating Mark Ragin. His debut match aired on the August 17 episode of Mid-South TV. As a member of Akbar's Army, he frequently teamed with Akbar's other clients. He also received a few title shots in Mid-South. The first title shot occurred against Butch Reed for the promotion's Television Championship on the October 19 episode of Mid-South TV, but failed to win. On the October 26 episode of Power Pro Wrestling, Corsario and Dutch Mantell unsuccessfully challenged Al Perez and Wendell Cooley for the Tag Team Championship. Corsario finished his run with Mid-South on November 11 at a live event by teaming with Steve Williams in a loss to The Bruise Brothers. During that year he also wrestled for Houston Wrestling.

=== Universal Wrestling Association (1986) ===
In 1986, Rivera wrestled a few matches for the Mexican promotion Universal Wrestling Association as Corsario I and teamed with Corsario II. On August 8, Los Corsarios lost a masks versus masks two out of three falls match to Los Brazos (Brazo de Plata and El Brazo). Corsario would then wrestle for UWA two more times in two out of three falls matches, losing both matches.

=== Capitol Sports Promotions (1987–1991) ===
==== Early championship reigns (1987–1989) ====
After a few exploits in various promotions, Rivera went to Miami, Florida, where he tried out for the World Wrestling Federation (WWF). He was accepted and sent back to Puerto Rico to wrestle for the Capitol Sports Promotions (CSP) as "TNT", adopting a Heel character based on his martial arts background and featuring several elements from stereotypical Hispanic gimmicks. He was managed by "El Profe" Ángel Pantoja Rivera. TNT made his CSP debut on May 2, 1987, by defeating Miguel Pérez to win the North American Heavyweight Championship, his first professional wrestling championship. On July 11, he became a dual champion, winning the World Tag Team Championship with Mr. Pogo by defeating The Youngbloods (Chris and Mark) and holding it for nineteen days, before losing it back to Youngbloods. TNT would then begin feuding with Pogo, defeating him in a match at Aniversario on September 20.

On January 30, 1988, TNT lost the North American Heavyweight Championship to Abdullah the Butcher. After the title loss, TNT participated in the La Copa Gillette tournament, in which he defeated Mr. Pogo in the first round, but fought Invader I to a time limit draw in the quarter-final. On June 18, he won the Caribbean Heavyweight Championship from Hercules Ayala. Two months later, he dropped it to Buddy Landel. After failing to regain the title from Landel in a rematch at Aniversario, TNT defeated Landel to win his second Caribbean Heavyweight Championship on September 17. TNT held the title for another two months before dropping it to Jason the Terrible.

On February 4, 1989, he defeated Sika to win the vacant Puerto Rico Heavyweight Championship, holding it for 21 days before losing it to Abbuda Dein. He defeated Jason the Terrible to win his third Caribbean Heavyweight Championship on March 4, and dropped it to Rip Rogers on May 14. On June 17, TNT defeated Carlos Colón to win the Television Championship. TNT would then begin feuding with Chicky Starr, whom he defeated in a gimmick versus hair match at Aniversario.

==== Universal Heavyweight Champion, rights to TNT name and W*ING tours (1989–1991) ====
During the last half of 1989, TNT had a midcard feud with Leo Burke, which was interrupted midway through when Burke defeated Carlos Colón for the Universal Heavyweight Championship. TNT was originally expected to win the belt, given his status as a fan favorite and solid wrestling skills. On February 9, 1990, he defeated Burke for the Universal Heavyweight Championship, marking the first world championship win of his professional wrestling career. As a result, TNT vacated the Television Championship. He held the Universal Heavyweight Championship for a month, before dropping it to Abdullah the Butcher.

On April 25, 1990, TNT defeated rival Leo Burke to win his second Television Championship. A few months later, TNT turned heel and began feuding with Carlos Colón, who had won the Universal Heavyweight Championship from Abdullah the Butcher. This led to a match between the two for the title at Aniversario, where they wrestled to a sixty-minute draw. Later that year, TNT lost the Television Championship to Steve Strong on December 4.

In early 1991, he feuded with a wrestler who had originally used the name "TNT", and began proclaiming himself "Original TNT". On January 26, TNT lost to Original TNT in a match for the vacant Television Championship. However, TNT defeated Original TNT in a non-title match on March 2, winning the rights to the TNT name, forcing his opponent to compete as "Action Jackson". The feud concluded later that month, when Rivera defeated Jackson to win his third Television Championship on March 30. On April 20, TNT lost the title to King Kong. On June 1, TNT defeated Kong to win his fourth Television Championship. At Aniversario, TNT teamed with The Giant Warrior to defeat Demolition (Crush and Smash).

TNT would then embark on a tour of Japan for the upstart promotion Wrestling International New Generations (W*ING) in August, as part of a talent exchange partnership between CSP and W*ING. On August 7, TNT competed in the main event of W*ING's first show, by teaming with Mr. Pogo and Steve Collins in a loss to Akitoshi Saito, Koichiro Kimura and Mitsuteru Tokuda. W*ING specialized in deathmatch wrestling style and TNT competed in various matches under the stipulation. On August 17, TNT lost a lumberjack deathmatch to Akitoshi Saito. TNT would then return to CSP to successfully defend the Television Championship against Samu on August 31.

TNT would then make a second tour to W*ING in September. On September 19, TNT teamed with Pogo to defeat Saito and The Iceman in a Caribbean Hurricane Cage Deathmatch. TNT's final match in W*ING took place on September 20, in which he defeated Yukihiro Kanemura. This would be TNT's final appearance for W*ING, as he exclusively returned to compete for CSP. TNT would then lose the title to Fidel Sierra on October 19. TNT regained the title by defeating Sierra in a rematch on October 26, winning his fifth and final WWC Television Championship. TNT lost the title, a month later to Dick Murdoch on November 23. Shortly after, TNT left CSP.

=== All Japan Pro Wrestling (1987–1988) ===
On November 22, 1987, TNT debuted in the Japanese promotion All Japan Pro Wrestling (AJPW) by teaming with Abdullah the Butcher to participate in the 1987 Real World Tag League, losing to Jumbo Tsuruta and Yoshiaki Yatsu in their AJPW debut. Abdullah and TNT scored twelve points in the Real World Tag League, and their participation in the tournament ended with a loss to Hiroshi Wajima and Giant Baba on December 11. Abdullah and TNT competed in several matches in AJPW in January 1988, including a title challenge against Ashura Hara and Genichiro Tenryu for the PWF World Tag Team Championship on January 9, 1988, in which the challengers came up short. They left AJPW after losing a match to Tsuruta and Yatsu on January 29.

=== New Japan Pro Wrestling (1990–1993) ===
On September 30, 1990, TNT made his debut for New Japan Pro-Wrestling, by losing to Masahiro Chono at Antonio Inoki's 30th Wrestling Anniversary event. TNT would make frequent tours to Japan to compete for NJPW between 1990 and 1993, competing as a gaijin. He wrestled major star Tatsumi Fujinami and rising stars Shinya Hashimoto and Keiji Mutoh in various singles matches. While he lost most of his singles matches, TNT would receive a few wins over Kengo Kimura and Black Cat. TNT's final match in NJPW took place on July 23, 1993, where he teamed with Masa Saito against Brad Armstrong and Hercules Hernandez in a losing effort.

=== Americas Wrestling Federation (1991–1993) ===
After some disputes over booking with Carlos Colón, he quit the World Wrestling Council and joined the newly formed Americas Wrestling Federation a promotion that started opposition against World Wrestling Council. AWF Americas Heavyweight Championship on two times. Feuded with Bill DeMott and Huracan Castillo Jr..

=== World Wrestling Federation (1993–1999) ===
==== Kwang (1993–1995) ====
Having gained much wrestling experience, Rivera was recalled to the United States. After losing two dark matches to Reno Riggins in the World Wrestling Federation as TNT in July 1993, Rivera debuted as Kwang on January 10, 1994. This gimmick incorporated clichéd elements previously used to portray mysterious "Asian" wrestlers and being billed from Japan, including a mask, a stereotypical martial arts moveset, and Asian mist. The WWF aired promotional vignettes in the weeks before his televised debut, which happened on January 22, 1994, when he, managed by Harvey Wippleman, was the fourth man to enter the 1994 Royal Rumble, marking Rivera's pay-per-view debut. During the match, he teamed with the fifth entrant, Owen Hart, battling the face wrestlers to a stalemate until Diesel entered seventh and eliminated all the previous entrants.

Kwang's televised singles debut was on the January 30 episode of Wrestling Challenge, where he defeated Ray Hudson. On the April 18 episode of Monday Night Raw, Kwang suffered his first loss in the WWF, against the WWF Champion Bret Hart. On the May 9 episode of Raw, he lost a King of the Ring qualifying match to Razor Ramon. On September 12, he lost to The Undertaker. On January 9, 1995, he was at ringside when Howard Finkel won a Tuxedo match against Wippleman, who then abandoned his role as Kwang's manager. After an appearance in the 1995 Royal Rumble, where he would eliminate Doink the Clown, Kwang gradually faded from WWF programming, losing his final match to Hakushi on the April 29, 1995, episode of Superstars.

==== Alliance with Razor Ramon (1995–1996) ====
Vega in the ring in 1995.

On May 14, 1995, Rivera appeared in street clothes and grew a goatee during the WWF's first In Your House pay-per-view. When Razor Ramon was attacked by Jeff Jarrett and The Roadie, Rivera, portraying a fan in the audience, jumped the guardrail to rescue him. Later that night, Razor introduced him as his childhood friend, "Savio Vega".

Vega made his wrestling debut on the May 28 episode of Action Zone, defeating Eli Blu. He then qualified for the 1995 King of the Ring tournament as a replacement for the injured Razor Ramon. He qualified for the tournament by defeating Irwin R. Schyster on the June 25 episode of Sunday Night Slam. Vega then defeated Yokozuna by countout in the first round, after interference from Yokozuna's tag partner, Owen Hart, backfired. He then defeated The Roadie with a rollup pinfall. He faced Mabel in the finals, losing after Mabel hit a splash off the ropes to win the tournament.

The next night on Raw, Vega defeated the Intercontinental Champion Jeff Jarrett by disqualification. Vega and Ramon would then feud with Men on a Mission (Mabel and Mo), losing to them at In Your House 2. On the July 31 episode of Raw, Vega and Ramon wrestled Owen Hart and Yokozuna for the WWF Tag Team Championship to a time limit draw, then lost a rematch for the titles the next week. For the rest of the year, he wrestled in tag matches with Razor and Bob Holly, as well as in singles matches against wrestlers including Waylon Mercy, Sid and Goldust. On January 1, 1996, episode of Raw, Vega teamed with Razor, unsuccessfully challenging The Smoking Gunns for the Tag Team Championship in a Raw Bowl match. In March 1996, Vega and Razor teamed one last time losing to Tatanka and Razor's former protege The 123 Kid and then afterwards Vega's alliance with Razor quietly ended.

==== Various feuds (1996–1997) ====
Vega was the twelfth entrant in the 1996 Royal Rumble, eliminating Dory Funk, Jr. before being eliminated by Vader. The following night on Raw, he lost to Vader. On the March 11 Raw, he wrestled Stone Cold Steve Austin for the first time, resulting in a double countout. This led to a feud, and a series of matches. The first of these happened at WrestleMania XII, both men's WrestleMania debut, which Austin won.

On the April 13 episode of Superstars, Rivera, wearing a mask featuring the flag of Puerto Rico and billed as "The Caribbean Kid", defeated Austin by pinfall, then unmasked himself. This was Austin's first singles defeat in the WWF, and The Caribbean Kid's sole appearance. On the April 15 episode of Raw, Vega challenged Goldust for the Intercontinental Championship. Vega won the match, but WWF President Gorilla Moonson reverted the decision and vacated the title. The following week on Raw, Vega and Goldust fought for the title, which was won by Goldust. Austin won a rematch at In Your House 7: Good Friends, Better Enemies on April 28. One month later, at In Your House 8: Beware of Dog, Vega defeated Austin in a Caribbean Strap Match. According to the stipulations, Austin's manager, Ted DiBiase, had to leave the WWF. This was DiBiase's last appearance on WWF television until 2005.

Vega then feuded with Justin Bradshaw, winning their first match on July 8. On July 21, he lost a rematch at In Your House 9: International Incident. On August 12, 1996, Vega lost his first match by submission to Crush. At SummerSlam, he lost a match to Owen Hart, and was then assaulted by Bradshaw. At In Your House 10: Mind Games, he defeated Bradshaw in a Caribbean Strap Match, ending their feud. During the match ECW originals The Sandman, Paul Heyman and Tommy Dreamer were in attendance because the event was held in Philadelphia where ECW originated in and Sandman spat beer in Vega's face and the three were kicked out of the building.

On the September 7 episode of Raw, Vega defeated Hunter Hearst Helmsley. This was followed with a victory over the fake Razor Ramon, who had appeared following the original Razor's departure to World Championship Wrestling. On the December 22 episode of Superstars, he teamed with Jesse James to unsuccessfully challenge Owen Hart and Davey Boy Smith for the Tag Team Championship.

Vega entered the 1997 Royal Rumble, but was eliminated by eventual winner Stone Cold Steve Austin.

==== The Nation of Domination (1997) ====
On January 25, 1997, Vega turned heel and joined The Nation of Domination, a stable led by Faarooq, after turning on his partner, Ahmed Johnson. Johnson became the Nation's main rival in the following months. In his first match as a member, he defeated Flash Funk. At In Your House 13: Final Four, he teamed with Faarooq and Crush to win a six-man tag match. In February, he lost consecutive matches by disqualification to Marc Mero and Goldust.

On March 17, 1997, Vega and Crush lost to The Legion of Doom by disqualification. At WrestleMania 13, they teamed with Faarooq to lose a six-man street fight tag match against the Legion of Doom and Johnson. On the next Raw, Vega lost to Johnson by disqualification when The Nation interfered.

Vega then feuded with Intercontinental Champion Rocky Maivia. Like Austin a year earlier, Maivia entered the feud as an undefeated prospect with a major push. On the April 14 RAW, Vega defeated Maivia by pinfall, while holding his tights. At In Your House 14: Revenge of the 'Taker, he once again defeated Maivia, this time by countout. After the match, he attacked Maivia's knee.

On May 11, at In Your House 15: A Cold Day in Hell, Vega wrestled as part of a gauntlet match against Johnson and was eliminated, before Faarooq won it for The Nation. The next night on Raw, he challenged The Undertaker for the WWF Championship, but was disqualified. On June 9, The Nation lost a rematch from WrestleMania 13 against Johnson and The Legion of Doom. After this, The Nation began having internal problems and soon disbanded, when Faarooq expelled several members, including Vega and Crush.

==== Los Boricuas (1997–1999) ====
Following his departure from The Nation of Domination, Vega formed his own stable, Los Boricuas, composed of Puerto Rican wrestlers, brought in from Puerto Rican promotions, all members of notable wrestling families. Miguel Pérez, Jr., a former Extreme Championship Wrestling and World Championship Wrestling wrestler, is the son of Miguel Pérez, Sr., Jesús Castillo, Jr. is the son of Pedro "Huracán" Castillo, and Jose Estrada, Jr. is the son of José Estrada, Sr. Meanwhile, Faarooq had organized The Nation into a black-only group, while Crush had formed The Disciples of Apocalypse, a white biker stable, launching an angle which became known as "The Gang Wars", based on ethnic stereotypes and loosely mirroring some actual gang wars. The three four-member teams wrestled against one another, with none gaining a clear advantage early on. At SummerSlam, Los Boricuas defeated The Disciples of Apocalypse. In the first singles match between former Nation members, Vega fought Crush to a no contest. At Ground Zero: In Your House on September 7, he defeated Faarooq and Crush in triple threat match. At the UK-exclusive pay-per-view, One Night Only, Vega and Pérez unsuccessfully challenged The Headbangers for the WWF World Tag Team Championship. At Badd Blood: In Your House, The Disciples defeated Los Boricuas. Between October and November, Vega also had singles matches, losing to Goldust, Mero and Ken Shamrock.

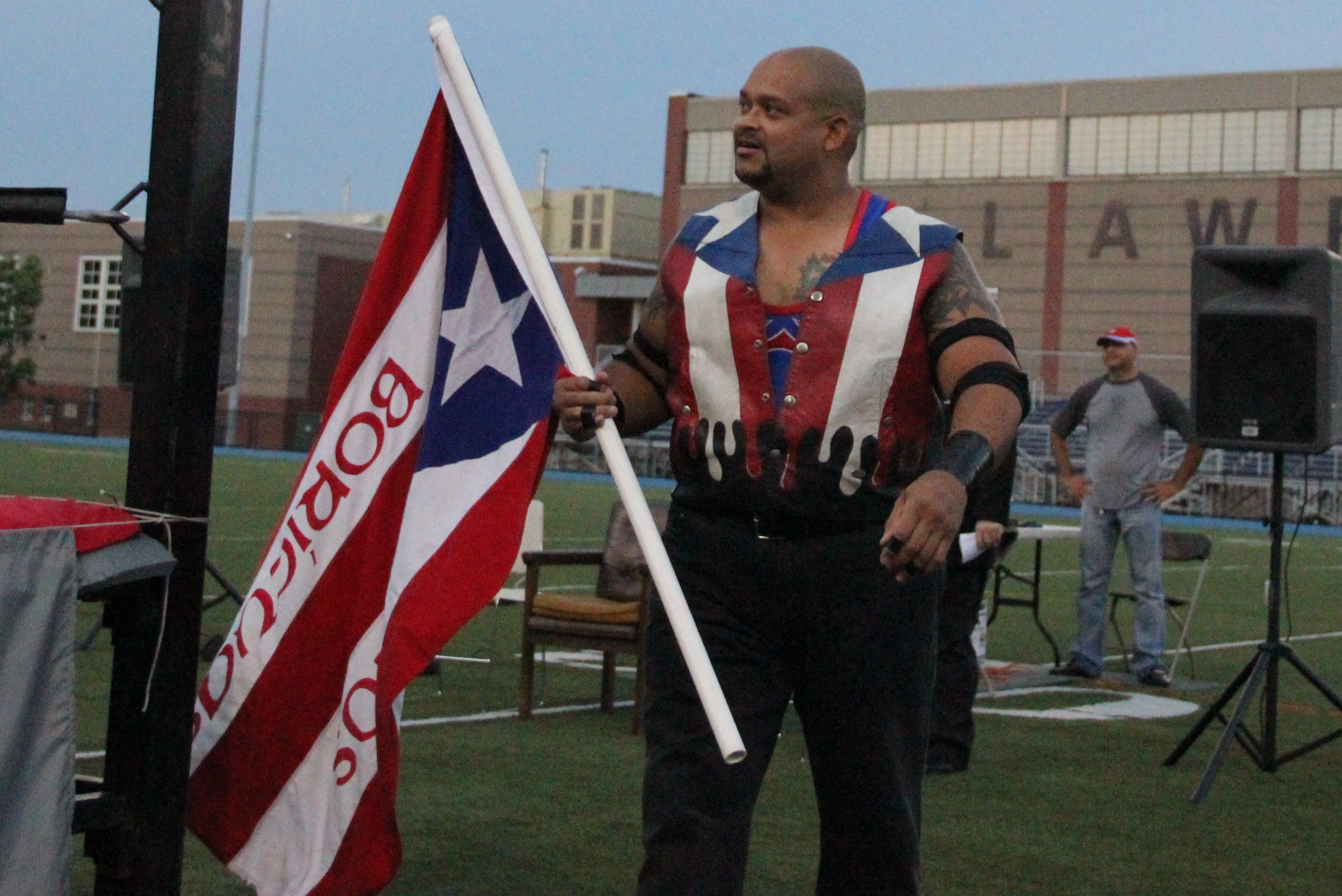
Vega with a Los Boricuas flag in June 2013

On the October 27 RAW, Vega and Pérez unsuccessfully challenged The Legion of Doom for the Tag Team Championship. In their next match, they lost to The New Age Outlaws. In December 1997, Los Boricuas and The Disciples exchanged victories.

His first singles contest of 1998 was a loss to Owen Hart. The next week, Vega and Pérez defeated Taka Michinoku and Scott Taylor. He was the 26th entrant in the 1998 Royal Rumble, and, like the year before, was eliminated by Steve Austin. In the Royal Rumble's main event, Vega and Los Boricuas attacked the Undertaker alongside the New Age Outlaws to aid Shawn Michaels in defeating him in a casket match. Vega headlined No Way Out of Texas: In Your House on February, when he replaced the injured Shawn Michaels in the eight-man tag main event, teaming with Triple H and the New Age Outlaws in a losing effort. On the March 9 Raw, he wrestled Triple H to a no contest.

At WrestleMania 14, Vega wrestled in a battle royal, won by Legion of Doom 2000. A week later, Los Boricuas lost to LOD 2000. The Gang Wars continued with matches against The Disciples in April. On May 4, Rivera lost to the NWA World Champion, Dan Severn.

The Gang Wars came to an end when the leaders of the three stables faced off in a triple threat match, which Vega won. After the angle, Los Boricuas splintered into two tag teams. On July 6, Vega defeated Brakkus in a Brawl for All tournament boxing match. On August 10, he lost a quarterfinal match to Darren Drozdov. As a result of a severe arm injury sustained from the Brawl for All tournament, he was released in August 1998.

Vega returned to WWF television in July 1999. He would make a number of appearances on WWF Super Astros, and would participate in WWF Shotgun and WWF Jakked/Metal dark matches (sometimes with other Boricua members). During this time, he provided commentary at the Spanish announce table at the Fully Loaded PPV and several episodes of Monday Night Raw. He was released again from his WWF contract in September 1999.

On December 15, 1999, Rivera defeated Prince Albert at an International Wrestling Association house show in Puerto Rico. The IWA was a new promotion founded by Víctor Quiñones, which was one of WWF's developmental territories.

=== International Wrestling Association (1999–2011) ===
Rivera joined the now independent IWA, upon returning to Puerto Rico. He wrestled as Savio Vega, though often ended feuds by wearing war paint in the final matches and changing his wrestling persona to "El Hombre Dinamita" (a reference to his "TNT" gimmick, which the WWC had trademarked and did not allow him to use).

On July 16, 2001, Vega defeated Jesus Castillo, his former Los Boricuas stablemate and now a member of a stable called "Los Intocables" with Miguel Pérez, for the IWA Hardcore Championship. He was forced to vacate the title after being unable to wrestle. Eventually, he turned on his former allies and became general manager, forming a heel stable called "La Compañia" (The Company), which included Apolo and Ricky Banderas, whom he called his "Dream Team".

Vega was depicted as co-owner of the IWA, though he had no real share in the company. As general manager, he was more often a manager than a wrestler. Under this authoritarian gimmick, he introduced his catchphrase, A mi manera o pa' la calle, (roughly, "My way or the highway"), with which he threatened to fire wrestlers, and occasionally did so. He would "discipline" wrestlers by mugging them in a mob, while singing a traditional Puerto Rican bomba, Santa María. Later in 2001, he allied with the main heel stable in the promotion, The Starr Corporation, composed of Chicky Starr, Víctor Rodríguez and Ricky Banderas. At Christmas in PR 2001, Vega and The Starr Corporation turned on Banderas and Shane, who teamed as Los Hermanos en Dolor, and feuded with Banderas. The Starr Corporation remained on his side until a conflict arose between them, leading Vega to expel Laureano from the IWA.

On March 2, 2002, Vega used his authority to award himself the IWA World Heavyweight Championship, eventually dropping it to Figueroa. Los Boricuas reunited later that year, when Pérez joined Vega to win the IWA World Tag Team Championship. In November 2002, Vega was injured by Banderas, and was absent for two weeks. When he returned, he pursued the support of Banderas, granting him a title match against Figueroa on January 6, 2003, in which he turned heel and joined La Compañia, who feuded with Figueroa, Vega bringing in foreign wrestlers to incapacitate him.

Banderas led La Compañia for several months, until Rey Fénix joined, triggering a power struggle in which Vega supported Fénix. Vega and Fénix defeated Banderas and Rodríguez in tag matches. After winning the initial feud in a match at Golpe de Estado 2003, Fénix revealed his true identity, Ray González, and abandoned La Compañia. Now joined by a heel Figueroa and Slash Venom, Vega feuded with González and his stable, La Familia del Milenio. This new faction had several matches against Figueroa & Kindred and Pérez & Castillo. At Golpe de Estado 2003, Rivera wrestled Huertas González to a no contest, due to a large amount of bleeding from both. On November 15, 2003, Kindred and Vega attacked Banderas following a match, and he was rescued by Vampiro, starting a new feud for La Compañia.

At Hardcore Weekend 2003, Rivera returned to his "El Hombre que ellos llaman TNT" persona, wrestling against Huertas González. To close the year, Rivera was fired by José Chaparro, who went on to take over the general manager office acting on behalf of the IWA's CEO, Thomas Wreckler. Víctor "The Bodyguard" Rodríguez emerged as the self-proclaimed leader of La Compañia during his absence. In June 2004, a storyline to bring Rivera back was run, in which the CEO, Thomas Wreckler, brought him in to stop La Familia and La Compañia. However, this storyline was interrupted by the death of Rodríguez due to a heart attack, and he unsuccessfully attempted to regain control of the general manager by challenging González at Summer Attitude. On July 25, 2004, Rivera reformed La Compañia. In August 2004, González was involved in an angle in which he won 49% of IWA's stocks. He then entered a feud with the owner of the remaining 51%, Víctor Quiñones. On August 28, 2004, at Bad Blood, González announced that from that moment onwards, IWA would be known as "Capitol Sports Promotions", claiming that Quiñones had already received documentation confirming this. González then began recruiting Huertas González to join him, claiming that their origin in "Capitol joins them". In September 2004, somebody assaulted Huertas González backstage, leaving behind Rivera's trademark bat. It was subsequently revealed that the culprit was "Lighting" acting on González behalf, just when Huertas González was about to join the "Capitol" faction.

On October 9, 2004, González announced that "Capitol" had formed an alliance with Total Nonstop Action Wrestling-NWA for Golpe de Estado and that this move would bring in NWA World Heavyweight Champion Jeff Jarrett, Robert Roode, Konnan and Shawn Hernandez. Immediately after completing this announcement, Rivera proposed that they bet the stocks at Golpe de Estado with the winner taking full control of both halves of the promotion, which was accepted. On October 14, 2004, with the score tied between "Capitol" and IWA, he defeated González ending the name change angle. At Christmas in PR 2004, González dropped the title to Sewell in a match ordered by him. On the other hand, Rivera himself teamed with Huertas González to challenge for the World Tag Team Championship. However, he turned on Huertas González and joined Sewell, turning La Compañia heel. Following this, Rivera took a random Canadian heel character, replacing his traditional outfit featuring the Flag of Puerto Rico to one sporting the Flag of Canada. He feuded with González throughout 2005. Both formed different tag teams with members of their stable, exchanging victories. On June 18, 2005, Rivera won a singles match over González. He subsequently brought Miguel "Mr. Big" Maldonado to La Compañia to serve as his personal bodyguard. On November 11, 2005, Rivera defeated Carlos Cotto to win his second World Heavyweight Championship. Later that month he retained in a leather strap match. A third match between them that featured José Huertas González as referee was declared a no contest. However, on January 6, 2006, he lost to González in a "loser leaves the company" match, losing a final contest against Huertas González before leaving. This was the second time that Rivera's role as general manager was overthrown and it was followed by a storyline which was run where Pérez had fired him and vignettes were aired where he was seen as a homeless man. Orlando Toledo, a nephew of the now-defunct Quiñones was introduced as the new general manager. A fictional election was held between Pérez and him, which Rivera won but was nullified due to him lacking a contract, making way to a new villainous president in Toledo. Upon being "reinstated", Rivera went on to feud with González and Sewell, forming a loose cooperation with Toledo. He went on to form a tag team along Huertas González known as "Los Inhumanos", when the former turned heel. Their union eventually dissolved and evolved into a feud, which saw Huertas González defeating Rivera in a "death match", his retirement contest for the IWA.

==== Los Autenticos and feud with Chris Angel (2006–2011) ====
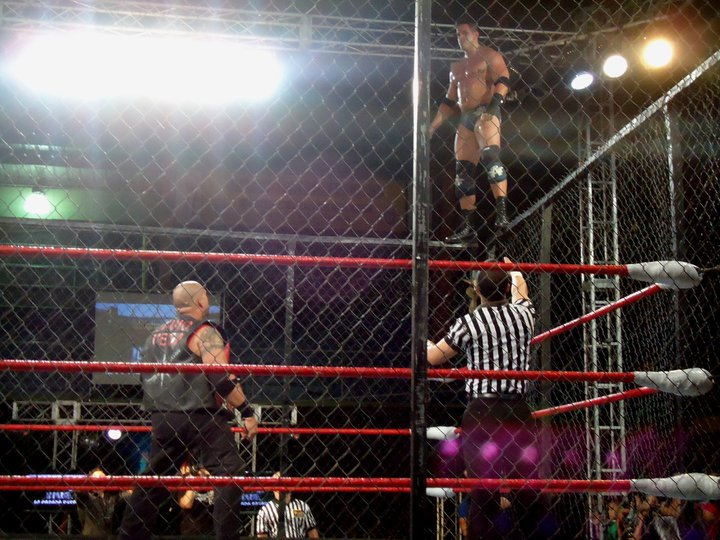
Savio Vega wrestling Chris Angel at Histeria Boricua 2011

Rivera eventually make amends with Pérez and joined him along Babderas and Sewell in order to feud with González and Toledo's Estrellas. Following a tag team match that went no contest in February 2007, his team won six consecutive matches against the heel factions. Rivera himself defeated Estrellas' members Kafu, Mikael Judas and the "Colossus" Michael Jarvis. He and Cotto formed a regular tag team to feud with Jarvis and Judas, earning a 2-1 advantage. Rivera went on to defeat Jarvis twice and get disqualified against Kafu leading to Summer Attitude 2007. Subsequently, Rivera joined Sewell to form a tag team, winning two matches against the Estrellas. He then entered a feud against Figueroa, with both of their matches going inconclusive. He remained in a feud with Toledo's Estrellas stable until early 2007, when the former left the company following an event where Rivera sided with Pérez when a conflict between him and Mario Savoldi. Upon retaking his role as general manager, he became the leader of a new heel stable known as "Los Auntenticos" along Pérez and Ricky Vega. This faction was quickly involved in an angle dealing with a power struggle against several other stables within the company. In his first match following a forced hiatus, Los Autenticos got disqualified in a match against González and Figueroa. They went on to defeat "Los Rabiosos", composed by Freddie "Blitz" Lozada and Maldonado. Rivera entered a feud against Lozada, after the former teamed with Ricky Vega to defeat Los Autenticos. On June 14, 2008, he defeated Vega. Rivera went then entered a feud with Bison Smith, losing twice. On October 4, 2008, he wrestled The Sheik to a no contest. The stable eventually grew to include Rivera's younger brother Dennis Rivera and his tag team partner Noel Rodríguez. Los Auntenticos would then create a "terror list" where the names of former WWC employees were written. This list was used in a new angle were the stable would ambush and attack wrestlers that were randomly selected from the list. At Golpe de Estado, Los Autenticos lost in a Boricua Rumble match, before winning their following appearance. As a sidetrack, Rivera ran a mock campaign to become Governor of Puerto Rico for the fictional Partido Luchador Puertorriqueño (PLP) prior to the 2008 general elections. The closure to the Loteria del Terror came when the other members turned on Rivera and Pérez, citing that "they themselves were part of Capitol once", igniting a sibling rivalry against Dennis Rivera who was supported by Noel Rodríguez and Richard Rondón. The feud continued with matches between both, Los Autenticos lost two tag team matches against this team, known as "La Malicia". In matches between brothers, the result was a no contest and a win by Dennis Rivera. Concurrently, he entered a second feud against Joe Bravo and his own stable, "La Compañia Elite". Rivera and Pérez won a match against two lowcard members of La Compañia. At the IWA's 10th Anniversary show, he wrestled Bravo to a no contest, with the Undisputed Heavyweight Championship being held up. Rivera lost the rematch.

In August 2009, he won a handicap match over Rondón and Rodríguez and teamed to defeat La Compañia. He went on to defeat Bravo and Edwin Vázquez Ortega in consecutive matches. Following this, Rivera once again turned heel, teaming with Gilbert, facing a stable known as "La Cruz del Diablo". Dennis Rivera eventually returned to his side citing that "blood is heavier than water". He won consecutive matches over Bravo at the Copa José Miguel Pérez and Summer Attitude. Rivera joined his brother in defeating The Bad Boys from Hell's Kitchen, also winning singles contests over Keith Walker and Sonny Roselli. In June 2010, Rivera was contacted by Hugo Savinovich in order to become involved in an angle with IWA's main rival, WWC. Savinovich serves as the producer of Aniversario, the WWC's main annual event. While still in negotiation, Rivera appeared in a talk show along Carlos Colón. Promotion of the angle began here by staging a spot where he criticized Carly Colón's supposed addiction to painkillers, prompting Colón to leave the stage. This marked the first time that both performed together in over a decade, following the lawsuit filled by WWC over the TNT character. During the following weeks, Rivera continued this line by issuing two challenges in IWA events, as well as changing the name of his finisher to "La Painkiller". At Summer Attitude 2010, Rivera defeated World Wrestling Entertainment employee Bryan Danielson, then IWA Puerto Rico Heavyweight Champion and first contender to the WWE United States Championship, by pinfall following his finishing move. Later that night, he sanctioned a contest for the belt between his brother and Danielson, which was won by the younger Rivera. Rivera then entered a feud with Álvarez, who had served as special referee at Summer Attitude 2010 and made his in-ring debut in the IWA, winning the contest between them. Rivera went on to win two more matches over midcard talent before entering a lengthy hiatus. Returning in winter, he confronted "The Academy", a group that had entered the IWA two months earlier that was harassing Pérez. At Christmas in PR 2010, Rivera wrestled and lost to one of The Academy's members, the debuting Chris Angel for the vacant Intercontinental Championship. A rematch was scheduled for Histeria Boricua 2011, which was promoted with a throwback angle in which he emphasized how having defeated other undefeated wrestlers such as Austin and Johnson, claiming that his loss at Christmas in PR was nothing but a fluke. Regardless of this, Angel won the rematch and eventually went on to become an undefeated world champion. Upon exiting the ring following the loss, Pérez confronted Rivera and told him not to return until he had "returned to his roots".

=== Total Nonstop Action Wrestling (2008–2009) ===
In July 2008, Rivera began working as a road agent for Total Nonstop Action Wrestling. In January 2009, he became head agent for the promotion's women's division, known as the TNA Knockouts. He also served as the unofficial trainer for the division during this tenure. On July 31, 2009, Rivera was released from his contract.

=== Return to TNA (2011–2012) ===
==== Ring Ka King (2011–2012) ====
In late 2011, Rivera was rehired by TNA, this time to work with Ring Ka King, a TNA affiliate promotion in India. Along with Jeff Jarrett and Dutch Mantell, he was responsible for training the Indian wrestlers at Ohio Valley Wrestling, TNA's developmental territory in Louisville, Kentucky.

=== International promotions (2007–2013) ===
While wrestling in the IWA, he competed in Revolution X-treme Wrestling based in Panama, performing in a battle royal to determine the winner of the vacant RXW World Heavyweight Championship, where he won the event. In January 2008, he began an international tour. This tour began with a presentation in Boston for Power House Wrestling Of New England. And continued with a visit to Ecuador where he would defend the Wrestling Alliance Revolution Tag Team Championship. The tour concluded in Panama where he defended the company's title against Ricky Banderas. In PHW he participated in a tag team match, where he teamed with a wrestler using the name Don Vega. They defeated a team that included the company's heavyweight champion. He would then compete in "WAR Conquest 2008", a special event organized by Wrestling Alliance Revolution. In this event he defended the company's tag team championship along Condor Ortíz, in a match that they lose after Ortíz accidentally kicked Vega. Following the match he turned on Ortíz, and subsequently challenged Kuervo, the company's heavyweight champion to a title match on the event. The encounter happened later in card, and Kuervo retained by disqualification after Vega spat green mist on his face. During the following summer Vega alternated his work between the IWA, Division One Pro Wrestling (D1PW) in Florida and Nu-Wrestling Evolution in Spain. Vega retained the RXW championship twice in June, against Ricky Vega and PJD. On March 21, 2009, Vega defended and lost the RXW World Heavyweight Title in a rematch against Panama Jack Daniels. Vega was released from his TNA contract on July 31, 2009. On October 2, 2009, Vega participated in a Wrestling Alliance Revolution card, defeating AP Dynamite for the WAR World Heavyweight Championship. On November 1, 2009, Vega and Pérez participated in a Dominican Wrestling Entertainment card, being booked to win the DWE World Tag Team Championship. They dropped the title on DWE's final event of the year, Cierre de Temporada, held on December 20, 2009.

On a Ring Ka King episode aired on February 11, 2012, Rivera returned to his T.N.T. character as part of his work as trainer for TNA. His opponent was an Indian wrestler called Jwala. None of the wrestlers were given a definitive heel or face role, but the local crowd supported his compatriot Jwala, who earned the pinfall by avoiding a maneuver by Rivera and applying his own finisher. He returned under the same guise on the March 24, 2012, RKK episode joining Nick Dinsmore in an eight-man tag team contest joining the Sheiks against the teams of Barood & Romeo Rapta and the Bollywood Boys. His team performed as the unambiguous heels, gaining the victory by employing illegal tactics. Vega became BSP World Heavyweight Champion by defeating Emperador Maximus on January 26, 2013, in La Barra in Caguas, PR. On April 28, 2013, Vega retained the BSP World Title by defeating Lloyd Samoa in Cayey, PR despite the outside interference from the challenger's manager Octavio 5to (Victor Manuel Sierra Garcia) and the BSP director of operations Alexis Baez. On July 7, 2013, Vega retained the BSP World Heavyweight Championship by defeating number one contender Dimes at its Summer Splash event held in San Lorenzo, Puerto Rico. On July 20, 2013, Vega lost the BSP World Heavyweight Championship to Dimes at Summer Splash La Revancha, held in Gurabo, Puerto Rico, after the challenger threw white powder in his face and then hit Vega with a pair of brass knuckles. After the match, Vega issued his rematch clause. On August 31, 2013, Vega lost to BSP World Heavyweight Champion Menace and Dimes in a three-way dance match celebrated in el sector La Jurado in Caguas, PR.

=== Interpromotional angles (2011–2014) ===
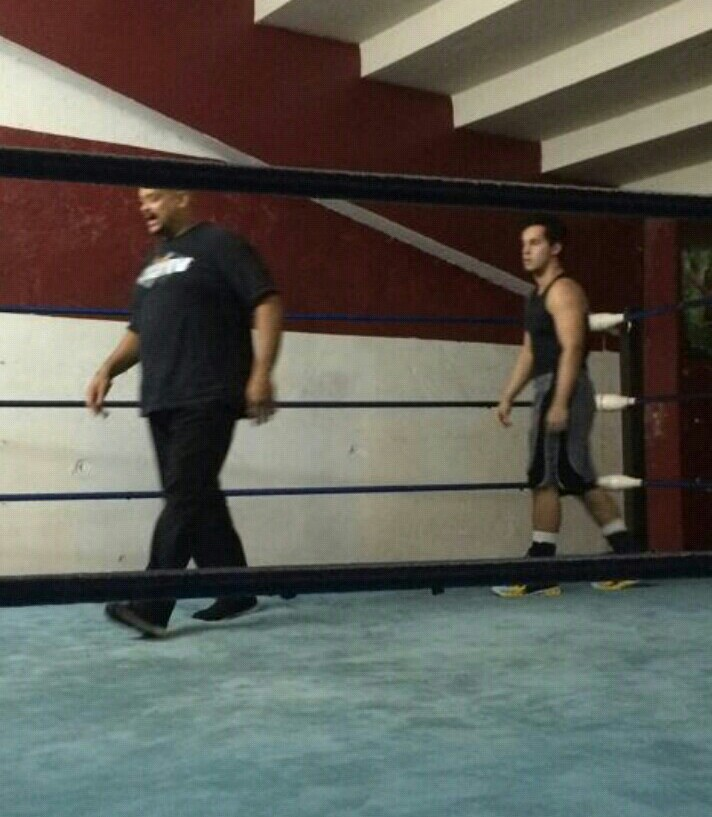
Vega with a student in 2014

Rivera remained completely absent from any wrestling-related activity for several months as a consequence. He reappeared on the final edition of WWC's Superestrellas de la Lucha Libre show before Aniversario 2011, interrupting the programming by stepping into the camera while wearing an IWA shirt. At the actual event, he led a large group of IWA wrestlers, including incumbent Undisputed World Champion Hiram Tua, who promptly invaded the WWC ring, beating down the WWC Tag Team Champions, Wilfredo "Lynx" Rivera and Alejandro "Niche" Marrero. This event became known as "El Bombazo", referencing his original gimmick and the explosive nature of actual TNT. Rivera himself addressed the crowd and issued another challenge to Colón who responded in a subsequent interview issuing a challenge of his own. The WWC responded by entering the IWA's next event, Summer Attitude and vandalizing Quiñones' Hall of Fame induction. Despite this, the negotiations between the promotions were stalled and no further actions were taken for the remainder of 2011. At Halloween Mayhem 2011, Rivera returned to IWA for the first time since Histeria Boricua 2011, turning on a heel Pérez and seizing control by regaining the office of general manager and joining the still-undefeated Angel and Phillip Davian to form a stable known as "La Academia Gerencial". The group stayed away from action for the remainder of the year due to him working the RKK project for TNA in OVW and India and he named an interim general manager who performed the role at Histeria Boricua 2012. Prior to the WWC's Euphoria 2012 event, Rivera reappeared in Superestrellas de la Lucha Libre, supporting Ricky Banderas in his contest against Colón. He eventually costed Colón the match, playing a video stating that the "hunting had begun" that lasted for the remainder of the scheduled time.

Concurrently, Pérez had launched a second interpromotional angle, this time involving the third largest company in Puerto Rico, the Extreme Wrestling Organization. Rivera himself remained uninvolved with this, holding a reunion with La Academia Gerencial. However, Angel and Davian left the promotion in February while he was working outside of Puerto Rico, disbanding the stable. Consequently, Rivera sided with the IWA upon returning, assaulting EWO employees at Clash of the Titans 2012. During this visit, he also participated in an event of a smaller independent company, New Revolution Wrestling, winning its heavyweight championship. On May 26, 2012, Rivera reappeared in the IWA and issued a challenge to EWO CEO Richard Rondón to a winner-takes-all match at Juicio Final. However, the event was postponed due to unspecified circumstances and the IWA's partnership with EWO was subsequently dissolved. In July 2012, Rivera began an independent tour, making appearances in International Gladiators Wrestling Alliance and the Puerto Rico Wrestling Association. He had previously wrestled in some shows of IGWA's predecessor, Lucha Libre Extrema Internacional. On October 7, 2012, Rivera reappeared in Superestrellas de la Lucha Libre, issuing yet another challenge. However, this time Colón backfired with a challenge of his own, inviting him to a special edition of Carlito's Cabana. The edition of the talk show that featured Rivera took place on October 14, 2012. In the segment, both traded insults and it finished with the security removing him when he tried to assault Colón after the former spat an apple in his face. At Halloween Wrestling Xtravaganza, Rivera reappeared and once again addressed the crowd before being removed from the facilities by Victor Jovica. At Honor vs Traición Rivera was summoned to a face to face by Jovica. At Lockout 2012 Vega served as special referee in the hair vs hair match between Ray Gonzalez and Carlito. On the November 9, 2013, episode of Superestrellas de la Lucha Libre, the return of Rivera as T.N.T. was announced. At Crossfire, on November 16, 2013, Vega defeated Chris Angel to win the WWC Universal Championship. However, he lost the title to Mighty Ursus at Lockout. TNT won the title back on January 19, 2014. On March 30, 2014, at Hora de la Verdad, TNT defeated Apolo to win the WWC Puerto Rico Heavyweight Championship. On July 19, 2014, TNT lost the title against Carlito Caribbean Cool. In October 2014, Vega left WWC.

=== World Wrestling League (2014–2015) ===
On October 10, 2014, after being previously advertised for the Aniversario event of WWC on October 25, 2014, and booked to win the WWC Puerto Rico Championship, Vega suddenly announced via his Facebook fan page that he was no longer under a WWC contract, thus being officially pulled from the event. The following day on October 11, 2014, he announced on his page he was now part of the Puerto Rican-based promotion World Wrestling League. Vega took on the role of WWL's tyrannus director of operations. After being fired by president Richard Negrín, he came back with Shane Sewell to attack Negrín and his heel stable and claim that his contract was for 5 years and that if he got fired, he would own 75% of the company. However, on March 23, 2015, WWL founder Negrín retired from pro wrestling and closed WWL. WWL reopened later, but Savio had already left.

=== Late career (2015–present) ===
After leaving the WWL, Savio Vega returned to local promotions where he has been regularly active in BSP, CWA, & NRW also makes international appearances in countries like Kuwait, and appeared in September and October on Amaro Production and Game Changer Wrestling.

On November 22, 2020, he made an appearance at Survivor Series during The Undertaker's retirement ceremony.

On July 10, 2021, he wrestled at Major League Wrestling's Battle Riot III entering twice in the match (as Savio Vega and Kwang).

Vega and Carlito appeared at Backlash on May 6, 2023, to assist the Latino World Order's Bad Bunny in his San Juan street fight match against The Judgment Day's Damian Priest.

In December 2024, Vega was defeated by IWA triple champion John Hawking in a match where Hawking’s titles were on the line, including his 40-year career and his executive role, being his last match.

In June 2025, Vega announced that he had begun working for Lucha Libre AAA Worldwide (AAA) as a producer. In May 2026, Vega became the English-language color commentator and interpreter for AAA, replacing Rey Mysterio who became the new AAA general manager.

== Championships and accomplishments ==
- Americas Wrestling Federation (Puerto Rico)
  - AWF Americas Heavyweight Championship (2 times)
  - AWF World Heavyweight Championship (1 time)
- Borinquen Sports Promotion
  - BSP World Heavyweight Championship (1 time)
- Championship Wrestling Association
  - CWA World Heavyweight championship (1 time)
- Dominican Wrestling Entertainment
  - DWE World Tag Team Championship (1 time) - with Miguel Pérez, Jr.
- International Wrestling Association
  - IWA World Heavyweight Championship (3 times)
  - IWA Hardcore Championship (1 time)
  - IWA World Tag Team Championship (3 times) - with Miguel Pérez, Jr. (2) and Invader (1)
  - Bruiser Brody Hardcore Weekend Memorial Cup
- Independent Wrestling Association Florida
  - IWA Florida Tag Team Championship (1 time) - with Miguel Pérez Jr.
- Latin Wrestling Alliance
  - LWA World Heavyweight Championship (1 time)
- Major League Wrestling
  - IWA Caribbean Heavyweight Championship (1 time)
- New Revolution Wrestling
  - NRW Heavyweight Championship (1 time)
- Pro Wrestling Illustrated
  - PWI ranked him #49 of the 500 best singles wrestlers in the PWI 500 in 1996
  - PWI ranked him #321 of the 500 best singles wrestlers during the "PWI Years" in 2003
- Revolution X-Treme Wrestling
  - RXW World Heavyweight Championship (1 time)
- Three Legacies Wrestling
  - 3LW Heavyweight Championship (1 time)
- World Wrestling Alliance (Puerto Rico)
  - WWA World Heavyweight Championship (1 time)
  - WWA Puerto Rico Heavyweight Championship (1 time)
- World Wrestling Council
  - WWC Universal Heavyweight Championship (3 times)
  - WWC Caribbean Heavyweight Championship (3 times)
  - WWC North American Heavyweight Championship (1 time)
  - WWC Puerto Rico Heavyweight Championship (3 times)
  - WWC World Tag Team Championship (1 time) - with Mr. Pogo
  - WWC Television Championship (5 times)
- Wrestling Alliance Revolution
  - WAR World Heavyweight Championship (1 time)
  - WAR Tag Team Championship (1 time) - with Condor Ortíz
- International Championship Wrestling Alliance
  - 1st Grand Prix Cup – with Team Puerto Rico (El Nazareno, Mecha Wolf 450, Chicano Cotto, Mr. Big and Roxxy)
- Wrestling Observer Newsletter
  - Worst Feud of the Year (1997) – vs. Disciples of Apocalypse

=== Luchas de Apuestas record ===
Winner (wager)	Loser (wager)	Location	Event	Date	Notes
Los Brazos (masks) (Brazo de Plata and El Brazo)	Los Corsarios (masks) (Corsario I and Corsario II)	UWA Live event	Mexico City, Mexico	August 3, 1985	

== In other media ==
Rivera is mentioned in Bad Bunny's single "Puesto Pa' Guerrial", released in the album YHLQMDLG.

He is portrayed by Puerto Rican actor Juan Pablo Díaz in the Eduardo “Transfor” Ortiz movie Las Super Estrellas de la Lucha Libre, based on Puerto Rican wrestling in Puerto Rico in the 1980s.

Vega also appeared as his masked WWF ninja character Kwang, as a hidden Sega 32X-exclusive wrestler, in the 1994 video game WWF Raw.

== See also ==
- Los Boricuas
- The Nation of Domination
- List of Puerto Ricans
