= Stephanie Wiand =

Actress and TV host

Stephanie Wiand is a producer and actress who previously worked as a host for the World Wrestling Federation.

Wiand joined the WWF in late 1994 as co-host of WWF Mania where she was introduced as original host Todd Pettengill's Christmas present. She was brought in to replace Randy Savage, who had left the company. Wiand was a host for the 1994 Slammy Awards. She also hosted the first In Your House event in mid 1995 and featured in the 32X version of WWF Raw video game. She left the WWF in the summer of 1995 to pursue other career opportunities.

In 1996, Wiand appeared in My Uncle's Barn, a sketch comedy show that ran at the Jewel Box Theatre in North Hollywood. In 2000 she wrote and starred in Scenes Through the Bathroom Window. In 2007 she played Joan in the science fiction web series Afterworld. In 2009 she co-produced and wrote for Ylse, a web series that starred Ruth Livier.

== External sources ==
Stephanie Wiand at IMDb
