= C. F. Pettengill House =

Historic house in Massachusetts, United States

- U.S. National Register of Historic Places
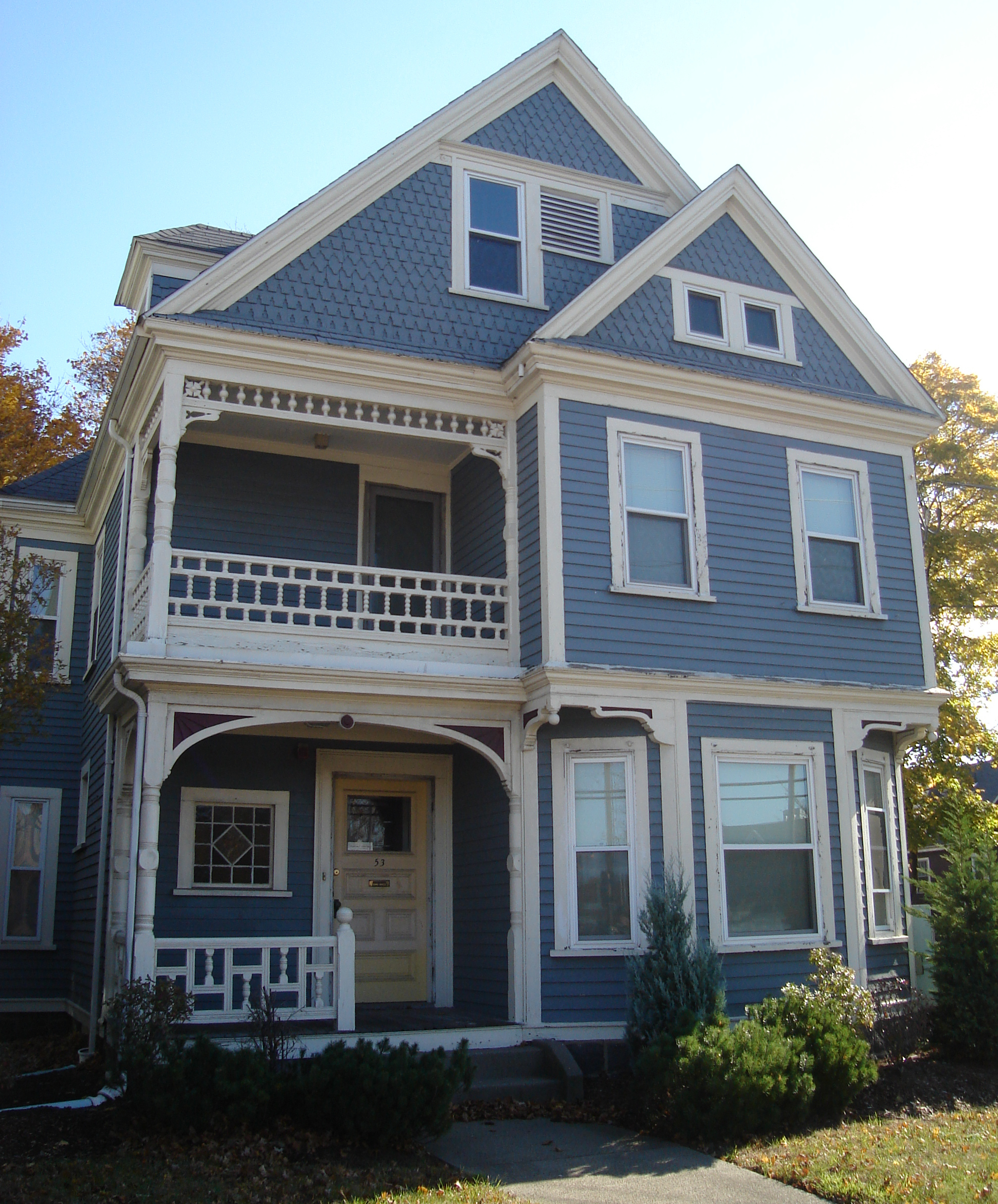
- C. F. Pettengill House

- Location within Massachusetts Location within the United States
- Location: 53 Revere Rd., Quincy, Massachusetts
- Coordinates: 42°14′52″N 71°0′2″W
- Built: 1890
- Architectural style: Queen Anne
- MPS: Quincy MRA
- NRHP reference No.: 89001951
- Added to NRHP: November 13, 1989

The C. F. Pettengill House is a historic house at 53 Revere Road in Quincy, Massachusetts. The 2 1/2-story wood-frame house was probably built in the 1890s; it is a finely detailed version of a Queen Anne style house which was once common in Quincy. Its features include varied gabling and shingle decoration, as well as a front porch decorated with latticework and turned posts. C. F. Pettengill owned a nearby jewelry and clock shop.

The house was listed on the National Register of Historic Places in 1989.

== See also ==
- National Register of Historic Places listings in Quincy, Massachusetts
