= Pettingill =

Pettingill is a surname. Notable people with the name include:

- Pettingill family, an Australian crime family
  - Kath Pettingill (born 1935), Former brothel owner and matriarch of the Pettingill family
- Kerry Pettingill (born 1958), retired American police officer, former chief of the Oklahoma Highway Patrol
- Sewall Pettingill (1907–2001), American naturalist, author and filmmaker
- Karuna Dharma (1940–2014), born Joyce Adele Pettingill, American Buddhist scholar and nun

== See also ==
- Pettengill
