= Jinsei Shinzaki =

Japanese professional wrestler (born 1966)

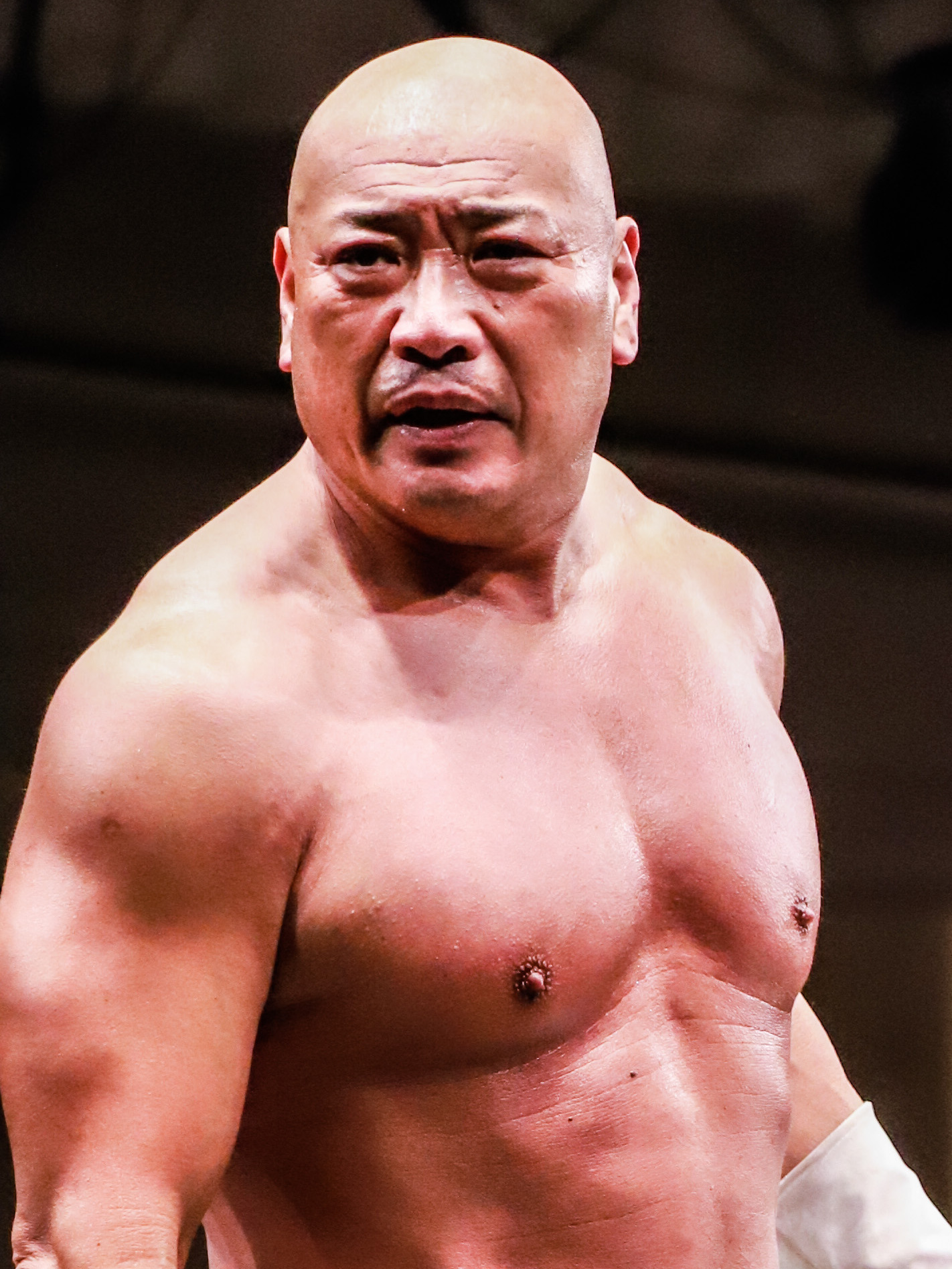
- Shinzaki in November 2022

Personal information
- Born: Kensuke Shinzaki; December 2, 1966 (age 59) Minami, Tokushima, Japan

Professional wrestling career
- Ring name(s): Hakushi; Jinsei Shinzaki; Mongolian Yuga; Mr. Nihon Kamikaze
- Billed height: 1.80 m (5 ft 11 in)
- Billed weight: 108 kg (238 lb)
- Billed from: Japan (as Hakushi)
- Trained by: Gran Hamada
- Debut: November 19, 1992

Kensuke Shinzaki (新崎 健介 Shinzaki Kensuke, born December 2, 1966), known by the ring names Jinsei Shinzaki (新崎 人生, Shinzaki Jinsei) and Hakushi (白紙), is a Japanese professional wrestler, wrestling executive, businessman and fitness coach. He is signed to the Michinoku Pro Wrestling promotion as a wrestler and their president. He is also a co-founder and co-runner of Sendai Girls' Pro Wrestling, alongside Meiko Satomura. Known as the "White Angel", Shinzaki is also known for his appearances with other Japanese promotions such as All Japan Pro Wrestling (AJPW), New Japan Pro-Wrestling (NJPW), and Frontier Martial-Arts Wrestling (FMW). To American fans, Shinzaki is perhaps most known for his stint in the World Wrestling Federation (WWF) from 1994 to 1996 as Hakushi.

Shinzaki's motto is the kongō-zue inscription, "Namu Daishi Hensho Kongo (Japanese: 南無大師遍照金剛, lit. 'I take refuge in the Great Master, the Diamond who illuminates everywhere.')". His gimmick sees him portray an aruki henro or Shikoku pilgrim, of which sees him in full pilgrimage garments, including white robes and a takuhatsugasa hat, and carrying a shakujo staff and a kongo-zue whilst praying to and in the ring. Outside of wrestling, he runs a food truck company and an elderly fitness organization.

== Professional wrestling career ==
=== Universal Lucha Libre (1992–1993) ===
A former soccer player, Shinzaki trained in amateur wrestling in high school. He first worked as an actor, but he left for professional wrestling after meeting Gran Hamada. Shinzaki trained in the Mexican style of lucha libre before debuting in Hamada's promotion Universal Lucha Libre in 1992, wrestling under a mask and the name of Mongolian Yuga.

=== Michinoku Pro Wrestling (1993–1994) ===
In 1993, Shinzaki followed The Great Sasuke to his promotion Michinoku Pro Wrestling, becoming one of its founders. In June 1993, Kensuke unmasked and changed his gimmick, re-debuting as Jinsei Shinzaki ("Jinsei" meaning "life" in Japanese), an aruki henro or Shikoku pilgrim. Jinsei debuted as a silent heel, being introduced by Mr. Yamaguchi as a special member of Super Delfín's heel unit in order to curse The Great Sasuke with his prayers. However, after disagreements with them, Shinzaki turned face in 1994 and joined Sasuke and his allies.

In May 1994, Shinzaki wrestled on a World Wrestling Federation tour of Japan. This led to him being offered a contract with the promotion later that year. The promotion was looking for a Japanese wrestler for the roster; Hayabusa had rejected an offer, choosing to work for Frontier Martial-Arts Wrestling instead, and Shinzaki was given the Japanese wrestler spot.

=== World Wrestling Federation (1994–1996) ===
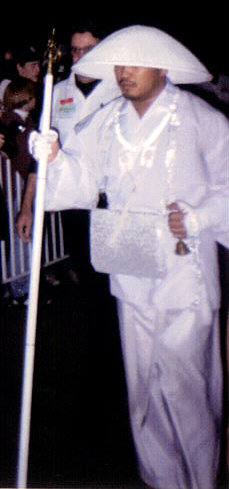
Shinzaki in 1995, as Hakushi

In November 1994, Shinzaki traveled to the United States to wrestle for the World Wrestling Federation (WWF). He wrestled as Hakushi (白使, "White Angel"), a derivation of his Michinoku Pro Wrestling persona. This new character resembled Jinsei Shinzaki, but he was characterized by sporting Buddhist shakyo written all over his skin, in a reference to Japanese folk character Hoichi the Earless. He was also accompanied by a facepaint-wearing cultist named Shinja. Initially a heel, his first few matches were highlighted by victories over jobbers which included future star Matt Hardy and midcarders like Aldo Montoya, and 1-2-3 Kid. Hakushi brought the wrestling style of lucharesu to the company, utilizing many aerial maneuvers, and stood out for using many of them to finish his matches as opposed to a single, established finishing move.

Hakushi had a brief alliance with ninja wrestler Kwang, calling themselves collectively "Shogun". After losing a tag team match, Hakushi blamed Kwang and turned on him. Hakushi subsequently defeated Kwang, in the Shogun team's breakup and blow-off match. This also happened to be the Kwang's last appearance. Hakushi then feuded with former WWF Champion Bret Hart, wrestling a number of competitive matches against him. He also participated in a three-way feud with perennial jobber Barry Horowitz and Bodydonna Skip. Horowitz, who lost for years on WWF programming to get over new talent, surprisingly used his three-quarter nelson to secure a victory over Skip. Hakushi would also fall to Horowitz soon after because of interference from Skip. His loss was a surprise to the fans, not only given Horowitz's long time losing record, but also given how well Hakushi did during his feud with Bret Hart in what had been Hakushi's first major feud in the company. Hakushi and Horowitz would briefly form a tag team, leading to a face turn for Hakushi. In Survivor Series, Hakushi was a member of The Underdogs team, but was eliminated after a kick from his enemy 1-2-3 Kid. He also was a competitor in the 1996 Royal Rumble, where he was eliminated by Bret Hart's brother, Owen Hart.

During a match on Raw against Justin "Hawk" Bradshaw on the March 6 episode (taped February 19), Hakushi was hit by Bradshaw's branding iron after a loss. That week on WWF Superstars, commentator Jim Ross reported that he had been so humiliated by the branding that he (kayfabe) left the WWF.

=== New Japan Pro-Wrestling (1996-1997) ===
Upon leaving his stint in WWF, Shinzaki returned to Japan. He made a single night appearance with New Japan Pro-Wrestling at "Battle Formation" on April 29, 1996, where he wrestled The Great Muta. Shinzaki was introduced as a mystic, supernatural character very much like Muta, who embodied evil while Shinzaki embodied good. Shinzaki was defeated in a spirited but mostly one-sided brawl. One year later on January 4's Wrestling World In Tokyo Dome 1997, he faced and defeated Heisei Ishingun member Michiyoshi Ohara, who was spoofing his gimmick and mimicked everything Shinzaki did.

=== Return to Michinoku Pro (1996–2000) ===
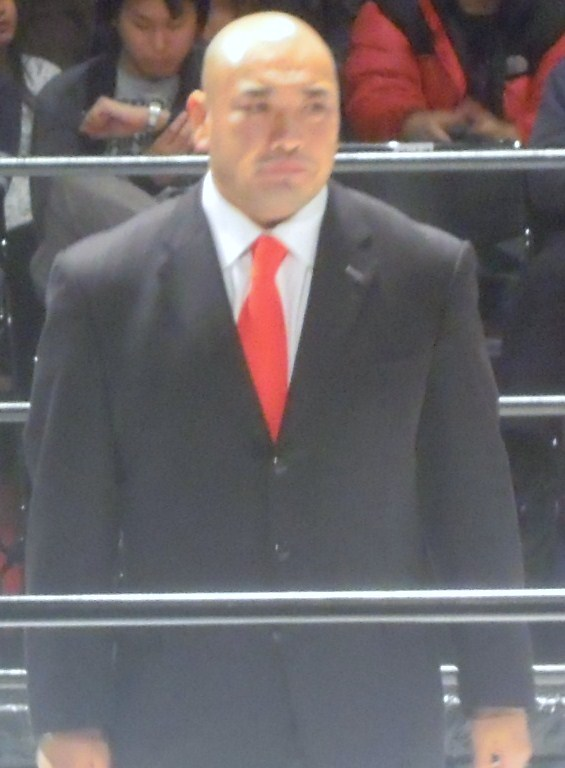
Shinzaki as Michinoku Pro's chairman in 2010

Shinzaki returned to Michinoku Pro Wrestling in October 1996 at the Michinoku Pro 3rd Anniversary event, defeating Hayabusa. Once again aligning himself with The Great Sasuke, Shinzaki was undefeated in singles matches until 1997.

In October 1997, the Hakushi character was brought up to go against WWF's "Dead Man" The Undertaker. Hakushi was now an undead as well due to having been "killed" in his match with Muta, and was introduced in a coffin by an entourage of Japanese traditional pallbearers, showing in his clothes the same blood stains he had got in said match. He faced Undertaker, but was defeated after a Tombstone Piledriver and entombed in the mountains of Tohoku.

=== Frontier Martial-Arts Wrestling (1997–1998) ===
In mid-1997, Shinzaki started appearing in Frontier Martial-Arts Wrestling helping Hayabusa in his battles against Mr. Gannosuke. They also had a brief stint in Extreme Championship Wrestling competing against Rob Van Dam and Sabu.

Shinzaki at a MPW show in January 2014

=== All Japan Pro Wrestling (1998–2002) ===
Shinzaki and Hayabusa competed in All Japan Pro Wrestling's Real Tag League 1998. In January 1999, they won the All Asia Tag Team Championship from Jun Izumida and Tamon Honda. They retained it until June 1999, when they lost it to Takao Omori and Yoshihiro Takayama. Shinzaki then kept a feud against Mitsuharu Misawa's Untouchables faction, but his appearances in AJPW became more sparse until ceasing in favour of Michinoku Pro in 2002.

In 2001, still as an AJPW representative, Shinzaki made a surprise appearance in New Japan Pro-Wrestling, wearing a white mask and causing Kazunari Murakami's defeat to Keiji Mutoh. Jinsei then unmasked, and Mutoh introduced him as the new member of his personal faction Bad Ass Translate Trading.

=== Second return to Michinoku Pro (since 2002) ===
Shinzaki has been the president of Michinoku Pro Wrestling company since 2003 as a result of Sasuke dedicating more of his time to his political career as a member of the Iwate Prefectural (state) Assembly.

Shinzaki is also the co-founder of the joshi promotion Sendai Girls' Pro Wrestling along with joshi wrestler Meiko Satomura.

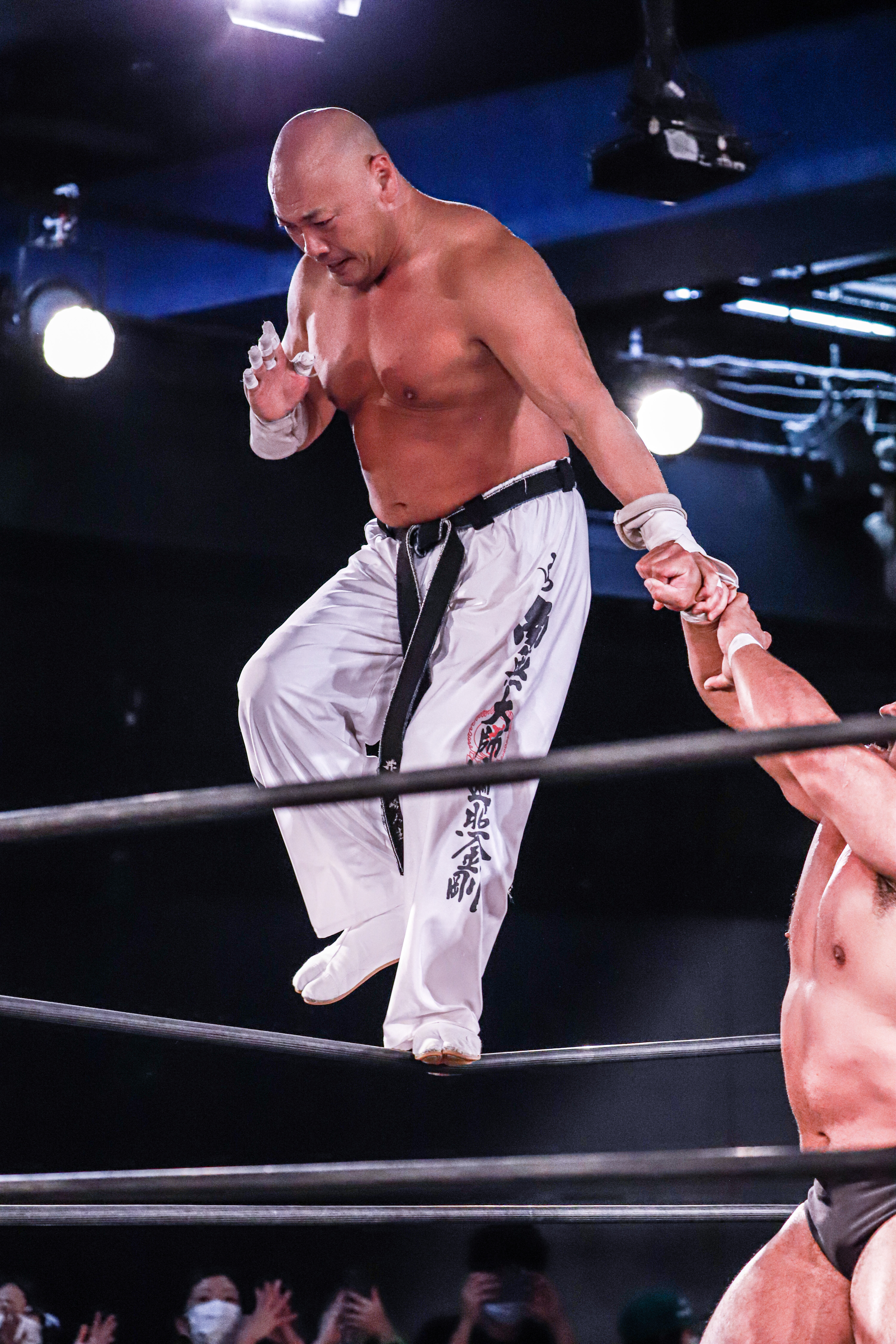
Shinzaki performing his Ogami-watari ropewalk, 2022

On April 15, 2011, Shinzaki returned to the United States to wrestle for Chikara in the 2011 King of Trios tournament, where he would represent Michinoku Pro with Dick Togo and the Great Sasuke. In their first round match Team Michinoku Pro defeated Team Minnesota (1-2-3 Kid, Arik Cannon and Darin Corbin). The following day, Team Michinoku Pro defeated Jigsaw, Manami Toyota and Mike Quackenbush to advance to the semifinals of the tournament. On April 17, Team Michinoku Pro was eliminated from the tournament in the semifinal stage by F.I.S.T. (Chuck Taylor, Icarus and Johnny Gargano).

== Personal life ==
Following the 2011 Tōhoku earthquake and tsunami, Shinzaki helped victims in the Tōhoku region by travelling around and providing them with food and drinks. Initial reports falsely noted that Shinzaki himself was living in his car due to losing his home and restaurant. However, this was incorrect as he was really just spending a lot of time traveling to help the needy.

== Championships and accomplishments ==
- All Japan Pro Wrestling

- All Asia Tag Team Championship (1 time) – with Hayabusa

- Michinoku Pro Wrestling

- Tohoku Tag Team Championship (5 times) – with Último Dragón (1 time), Gaina (2 times), Kesen Numajiro (1 time) and The Great Sasuke (1)
- UWA World Tag Team Championship (1 time) – with The Great Sasuke
- Futaritabi Tag Tournament (1994) – with Super Delfin
- Michinoku Trios League (2005) – with The Great Sasuke and Kesen Numajiro

- Pro Wrestling Illustrated

- Ranked No. 48 of the top 500 singles wrestlers in the PWI 500 in 1995
- Ranked No. 209 of the 500 best singles wrestlers during the "PWI Years" in 2003

- Tokyo Sports

- Newcomer Award (1993)
