= Todd Pettengill =

American radio disc jockey (born 1966)

Personal information
- Born: Todd Clark Pettengill; April 18, 1966 (age 60) Hagaman, New York, U.S.
- Spouse: Carrie Pettengill (m. 1987)
- Children: 2

Professional wrestling career
- Debut: 1993

Todd Clark Pettengill (born April 18, 1966) is a former American radio disc jockey who most recently worked for WPLJ 95.5 in the New York area. From 1993 to 1997, he also served as an on-screen backstage interviewer for the World Wrestling Federation.

== Career ==
=== Radio ===
Pettengill started his career in radio at the age of 13 at a local radio station in Amsterdam, New York. In 1986, he hosted the morning radio show on the Albany, New York area's WFLY "Fly 92", called the Wake Up Service. It was the highest rated show in Albany history. Later on, he was promoted to program director and then vice president of Albany Broadcasting Company. Pettengill left the station for WIOQ in Philadelphia and eventually WPLJ in New York. He was the youngest morning show host in New York radio at the age of 25, when he became co-host of the WPLJ morning show with Scott Shannon, where he is known for his "phone scams". Pettengill and Shannon were seen on Dish Nation. Todd Pettengill has been named Billboard Magazine Major Market Air personality of the year six times and Radio and Records Major Market Air personality of the year four times. He founded Pettengill Productions, Inc in 1993 and 17Black, LLC in 2007.

On February 7, 2014, Shannon announced he was leaving WPLJ. Pettengill then announced his newest venture: The Todd Show in the Morning on WPLJ. From January 2016 until the radio station's sale and sign-off in 2019, Pettengill co-hosted Todd & Jayde in the Morning alongside Jayde Donovan from Sacramento's KDND.

Pettengill was the host of a Saturday night 1980s music program known as Saturday Night at the 80s (later renamed Todd Pettengill at the 80's). The show was broadcast in twenty-seven markets, including New York, Washington, D.C., Detroit and Miami. It was distributed by ABC Radio Networks.

=== World Wrestling Federation ===
Pettengill also worked for the World Wrestling Federation in the mid-1990s, as a backstage interviewer. He replaced Sean Mooney, who had elected not to renew his expiring contract. He made his WWF debut as host of the Saturday morning program WWF Mania on January 9, 1993. Pettengill also hosted Free for All with co-host Dok Hendrix, WWF Blast-Off, WWF LiveWire and WWF Action Zone. Pettengill made his WrestleMania debut at WrestleMania IX. He performed the opening number "WWF Superstars" at the 1996 Slammy Awards & The following year, he presented the Slammy for "Miss Slammy" to Sable. His final WWF pay-per-view appearance was at SummerSlam in August 1997. Pettengill had informed WWF executives that he wished to leave the company, as the grind of juggling his WWF duties and his radio career was proving to be too hectic. His last WWF appearance was to provide voice over for a promo package about The Patriot at Ground Zero: In Your House.

==== Sporadic appearances (2013–present) ====
In 2013, Pettengill returned to the WWE (formerly known as WWF) for the first time since August 1997, and hosted segments of the WWE DVD and Blu-ray release The Best of In Your House: Pay-Per-View Classics 1995–1999, a compilation of several matches from the 1990s In Your House pay-per-view series. On January 26, 2020, Pettengill appeared on the watch along event that took place alongside the Royal Rumble. He appeared again in a June 2020 promotional video for the NXT TakeOver: In Your House event and did so the following year for the 2021 edition of In Your House.

== Personal life ==
Pettengill resides in Texas. He is married to Carrie and they have two daughters.
