= Killer Kyle =

American professional wrestler

Personal information
- Born: Mark Kyle Atlanta, Georgia, US

Professional wrestling career
- Ring name(s): Big Money Marcus; Killer Kyle; Mark Kyle
- Billed height: 6 ft 2 in (1.88 m)
- Billed weight: 303 lb (137 kg)
- Billed from: Albuquerque, New Mexico; Hell's Kitchen, New York
- Debut: 1988
- Retired: 2003

Mark Kyle is an American semi-retired professional wrestler, known by his ring name, Killer Kyle. Kyle is best known for his successful stint in Smoky Mountain Wrestling as well as being a regular on the independent circuit in the southeastern United States with professional wrestling promotions such as Music City Wrestling and Southern States Wrestling. He is also known for being an enhancement talent for World Championship Wrestling and the World Wrestling Federation during the 1990s as well as a brief run for NWA:TNA in their early days.

== Professional wrestling career ==
=== Early career (1988–1992) ===
Born in Morristown, Tennessee, Mark Kyle made his professional debut for Continental Championship Wrestling as Pvt. Mark Kyle. His earliest match was against Danny Davis on May 28, 1988. He began wrestling for Jim Crockett Promotions within two years. On January 16, 1990, he made his first WCW appearance at the Center Stage Theatre in Atlanta, where he and Rick Fargo lost to The Rock 'n' Roll Express (Ricky Morton & Robert Gibson). He also received matches against NWA World Tag Team Champions The Steiner Brothers (Rick & Scott Steiner) with Brad Batten on January 31 and Ned Brady on February 17. He also teamed with Jerry Rose and Bob Cook in a 6-man tag team match against Mike Rotunda, Norman the Lunatic and Abdullah the Butcher at the Georgia Mountains Center in Gainesville, Georgia on April 2.

In July 1990, he appeared on NWA Worldwide against Star Blazer and, with Fred Avery, against The Southern Boys (Steve Armstrong & Tracy Smothers). He also faced Hector Guerrero that same year.

=== Smoky Mountain Wrestling (1992–1995) ===
Kyle made his debut in Smoky Mountain Wrestling during early-1992 and was eventually introduced as the bodyguard of Jim Cornette. In one of the first episodes of SMW's weekly television show, Kyle pinned Keith Hart in Knoxville on March 28. On May 16, Kyle pinned Rex Hargrove in Hazard, Kentucky and defeated Tommy Angel at a SMW television taping in Spartanburg, South Carolina later that month. During the first weeks of June, he would suffer losses to Dixie Dynamite, Robert Gibson and Hector Guerrero.

At a June 15 taping at Cumberland High School in Cumberland, Kentucky, Kyle defeated Danny Davis. Davis had fought to a no-contest with Dixie Dynamite against The Batten Twins (Bart & Brad Batten) earlier that night. Along with Joe Cazana, Kyle would face Brad & Bart Batten the following week at a house show held at the Raleigh County Armory in Beckley, West Virginia.

On July 6, Kyle lost another match to Dixie Dynamite at Polk High School television taping in Benton, Tennessee. He and Joe Cazana lost to The Fantastics (Bobby & Jackie Fulton) at Durango Park in Knoxville, Tennessee a week later. At Summer Blast '92, he fought to a draw with Danny Davis at the Knoxville City Coliseum in front of 1,000 fans.

Feuding with Dixie Dynamite, Kyle pinned him in a "taped fist" match in Richwood, West Virginia on August 5. Although losing to him in Castlewood, Virginia two days later, he defeated him at Fire on the Mountain '92 at Freedom Hall in Johnson City, Tennessee on August 8. Defeating Dixie Dynamite in another "taped fist" match at the Raleigh County Armory the next night, Kyle also beat Tommy Angel by submission at Polk High School on August 10.

By the end of the month however, Kyle suffered a disqualification loss to Dixie Dynamite during a match at James A. Cawood High School in Harlan, Kentucky and again in the third round of a boxing match at the Raleigh County Armory. He lost another match to Dixie Dynamite on September 4 when he was unable to pin his opponent within the 15 minute time limit. He also lost to Dixie Dynamite by disqualification in a second boxing match at Dobbins Bennett High School in Kingsport, Tennessee. He and The Heavenly Bodies (Stan Lane & Tom Prichard) teamed to defeat Brian Lee, Tim Horner and Dixie Dynamite in a 6-man tag team match when Kyle pinned Brian Lee at the Raleigh County Armory on September 6. However, he lost to Dixie Dynamite the next night at Lincoln High School in Shinnston, West Virginia with 1,100 in attendance.

On September 12, Kyle pinned Mike Sampson at Cumberland High School. Although disqualified in a match in Johnson City against Brian Lee a week later, he beat Newton Stephie at East High School in Morristown, Tennessee on September 27. In late-October, he also faced Robbie Eagle and Ronnie Garvin.

In early 1993, Kyle faced both Tim Horner and Brian Lee in failed attempts to win the SMW "Beat the Champ" Television Championship. He would also face Brian Armstrong and Jerry Lynn in both their SMW debuts.

At Volunteer Slam II, he beat Robert Fuller at the Knoxville Civic Auditorium by disqualification on May 9. He later participated in the main event, the 10-man "Rage in the Cage" match, teaming with Kevin Sullivan, The Tazmaniac and The Heavenly Bodies against Jimmy Golden, Brian Lee, Robert Fuller and The Rock 'n' Roll Express. He also pinned Bobby Blaze at Last Tango in Tennessee in Johnson City less than a week later. On August 15, he faced Brian Anderson in his SMW debut match. In October, he faced Gator McCallister, Tim Horner and The Bullet who agreed to unmask if he lost to Kyle. On November 13, he faced Bobby Blaze with Chris Candido in his corner.

On February 7, 1994, Kyle defeated The Hornet for the SMW "Beat the Champ" Television Championship in Jellico, Tennessee. Losing the title to Mike Furnas in Dungannon, Virginia a month later, he also faced SMW Heavyweight Champion "Dirty White Boy" Tony Anthony in early-1994 but failed to win the title. On April 1, Kyle defeated Anthony Michaels at Blue Grass Brawl II at the Pikeville County Gym. He and Dark Secret faced the Rock 'n' Roll Express three weeks later.

He also lost to Doug Furnas at the Night of Legends supercard on August 5 Later that month, he faced Tony Anthony for the SMW Heavyweight title. Kyle also faced him in a tag team match with Bruiser Bedlam against Anthony and Tracy Smothers. He was briefly aligned with The Gangstas (New Jack & Mustafa Saed) during the brief feud with The Undertaker. In one memorable interview, he accompanied New Jack and D-Lo Brown to a local cemetery where they were momentarily frightened by a black cat which had appeared on camera during New Jack's promo. In December, Kyle made a brief return to WCW losing to Jim Duggan at a house show in Dalton, Georgia on December 6 and, two days later, lost to Sting at the Center Stage Theatre in Atlanta. Both matches were later aired on WCW Saturday Night and WCW Main Event.

Kyle defeated Boo Bradley to win the vacant SMW "Beat the Champ" Television title in Lenoir, North Carolina on February 6, 1995. He defended the title for two months before losing to Bobby Blaze in Pikeville, Kentucky on April 7. On that same day, he also lost to Boo Bradley at Blue Grass Brawl III. At Volunteer Slam IV, he lost to Boo Bradley in a dog collar match at the Knoxville Civic Auditorium on May 19. He again returned to WCW appearing on WCW Pro to team with Johnny Swinger against The American Males (Scotty Riggs & Marcus Alexander Bagwell) on September 16 and Road Warrior Hawk on Monday Night Nitro the following month.

=== W*ING (1993) ===
In 1993, Kyle had a successful tour of Japan courtesy of SMW's working agreement with the Japanese Deathmatch promotion W*ING. While in Japan he would wrestle some of the promotions top stars including Kintaro Kanemura, Crash The Terminator and Mr. Pogo as well as finding himself teaming with the likes of Freddie Krueger, Víctor Quiñones and Bart Sawyer. In May 1993, he would also challenge Kanemura in Kanazawa, Ishikawa for the WWC Caribbean Heavyweight Championship losing via disqualification before finishing the tour teaming with the legendary Kevin Sullivan in a series of matches against Kanemura, Miguelito Pérez and Mitsuhiro Matsunaga.

=== Later career (1995–2003) ===
Following the close of Smoky Mountain Wrestling in November 1995, Kyle spent the next few years in various independent promotions including Southern States Wrestling where he faced Wahoo McDaniel. This match was later released on DVD as Superstars and Legends, Vol. 1 years later. He also had brief appearances in Music City Wrestling and later for Ron's Championship Wrestling, Ultimate Championship Wrestling and North American Championship Wrestling. From 1996 to 1999, he appeared in the World Wrestling Federation losing to Yokozuna in a handicap match, Ken Shamrock, Faarooq, and Tiger Ali Singh. In 1999, he would briefly team with Luther Biggs as Hard Knox with manager Coach Buzz Stern in World Championship Wrestling. In January 2003, he made a single appearance with NWA Total Nonstop Action, teaming with Spyder in a loss to Matt Vandal and Mike Preston on TNA Xplosion.

On February 2, 2008, Kyle appeared for Knoxville Area Professional Organized Wrestling at its World War Lenoir card at the National Guard Armory in Lenoir City, Tennessee. The show also featured Samoa Joe, Mr. Wrestling III and a number of East Tennessee independent wrestlers.

== Championships and accomplishments ==
- All-American Wrestling
  - AAW Heavyweight Championship (1 time)
  - AAW Tag Team Championship (1 time) – with Masked Superstar
- Ron's Championship Wrestling
  - RCW Tag Team Championship (1 time) - with Jeff Anderson
- Smoky Mountain Wrestling
  - SMW Beat the Champ Television Championship (2 times)
- Ultimate Championship Wrestling
  - UCW Heavyweight Championship (1 time)
