= Tracy Smothers =

American professional wrestler (1962–2020)

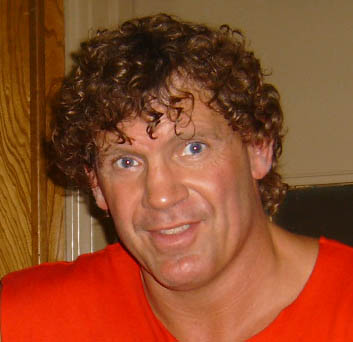
- Smothers in 2007

Personal information
- Born: Tracy Stanton Smothers; September 2, 1962 Springfield, Tennessee, U.S.
- Died: October 28, 2020 (aged 58) Evansville, Indiana, U.S.

Professional wrestling career
- Ring name(s): Freddie Joe Floyd; Jason the Terrible; Shaquille Ali; Tracy Smothers; Wrestling's Favorite Grandpa
- Billed height: 6 ft 1 in (185 cm)
- Billed weight: 235 lb (107 kg)
- Billed from: Nashville, Tennessee "Nashville, Italy" (ECW); Southern Italy (ECW); Bowlegs, Oklahoma (as Freddie Joe Floyd); Cheyenne, Wyoming
- Trained by: Stan Lane; Steve Keirn
- Debut: 1982
- Retired: 2019

Tracy Stanton Smothers (September 2, 1962 – October 28, 2020) was an American professional wrestler, best known for his appearances with World Championship Wrestling, Smoky Mountain Wrestling, the World Wrestling Federation, and Extreme Championship Wrestling.

== Early life ==
Smothers was born in Springfield, Tennessee, on September 2, 1962, and graduated from Springfield High School, where he played football, golf, and wrestled. Smothers was the first person in Springfield High School history to go to the state championship in wrestling.

== Professional wrestling career ==
=== Early career (1982–1984) ===
Smothers started his career in 1982 after being trained by Steve Keirn and Stan Lane. He later appeared in the combined promotional effort Pro Wrestling USA, making his televised debut at a taping on September 18, 1984, that was held in Memphis.

=== Continental Wrestling Association (1984–1986) ===
A month later, Smothers traveled to the Continental Wrestling Association, spending 1985 as an enhancement talent appearing on Saturday morning television.

For the first time in his nascent career, Smothers, a natural babyface, began to receive a noticeable push, gaining wins over the likes of Danny Davis, Gypsy Joe, Ron Sexton, and David Haskins. Smothers would become a two-time NWA Mid-America Heavyweight Champion during his time with the company.

While in Continental, Smothers wrestled an unmuzzled bear that was announced as 550 lbs; Tracy took the bear to the mat several times. The bear, incapable of understanding the situation, thought they were playing.

=== Championship Wrestling from Florida and other promotions (1987–1989) ===
Smothers joined Championship Wrestling from Florida in February 1987 and immediately formed a tag team with Steve Armstrong as "The Wild-Eyed Southern Boys". On February 21, The Southern Boys defeated The New Breed to gain their first ever championship, the NWA Florida Tag Team Championship. Smothers and Armstrong held the belts until March 15, when they were defeated by The MOD Squad. In June, they unsuccessfully challenged for the NWA United States Tag Team Championship, losing to The Midnight Express (Stan Lane & Bobby Eaton).

The Southern Boys (originally without Armstrong) also spent time in Japan to work for New Japan Pro-Wrestling (NJPW). Afterwards, he returned to CWA, which was now the renamed United States Wrestling Association. Smothers teamed with John Paul to win the vacated CWA Tag Team Championship from Action Jackson and Robert Fuller. Armstrong eventually joined up with Smothers and reformed the Southern Boys, and they became embroiled in a feud with The Stud Stable.

=== World Championship Wrestling (1990–1992) ===
Smothers reunited with Steve Armstrong and made their debuts for World Championship Wrestling on April 23, 1990, in a dark match at a Main Event/WCW WorldWide taping in Marietta. Wrestling as "The Wild-Eyed Southern Boys", their first television appearance came on May 12 at a World Championship Wrestling taping, where they defeated Kevin Sullivan and Cactus Jack via disqualification.

The Southern Boys defeated The Fabulous Freebirds (Jimmy Garvin and Michael Hayes) on June 13 at Clash of the Champions XI. They gained revenge by defeating the Pistols on the June 16, 1990, episode of WCW Worldwide. Smothers and Armstrong started a feud with The Midnight Express, culminating in a match between the two teams on July 13 at the Great American Bash, which the Midnight Express won. It was considered the best match in the U.S. of that year and one of the all-time classic tag team matches of the era; it was also high in virtually every match of the year poll. On September 5, they defeated Hayes and Garvin at Clash of the Champions XII. On February 24, 1991, at WrestleWar, they defeated The Royal Family (Jack Victory and Rip Morgan). A few days earlier, they were renamed The Young Pistols.

On May 19, they lost to The Freebirds at SuperBrawl I in a match for the vacated United States Tag Team Championship after "Badstreet" (a masked Brad Armstrong) interfered. On June 12, The Young Pistols and Tom Zenk defeated Hayes, Garvin, and Badstreet at Clash of the Champions XV. The Young Pistols soon turned heel, and on the December 15 episode of WCW Main Event, they defeated The Patriots (Todd Champion and Firebreaker Chip) to win the WCW United States Tag Team Championship. On December 29 at Starrcade '91: Battlebowl – The Lethal Lottery, Smothers and Hayes lost to Marcus Bagwell and Garvin in a Lethal Lottery tag team match. On the February 16, 1992, episode of WCW Pro, they lost the titles to Ron Simmons and Big Josh.

In April, Armstrong left WCW, leaving Tracy to soldier on as a singles competitor. He remained as a heel, and on May 17 at WrestleWar, he lost to Johnny B. Badd. At Beach Blast on June 20, he, Ricky Morton, and Diamond Dallas Page lost to Junkyard Dog, Big Josh, and Tom Zenk in a six-man tag team match before leaving the company in August.

=== Smoky Mountain Wrestling (1992–1995) ===
Three months after departing World Championship Wrestling and following a very brief period in the United States Wrestling Association, Tracy Smothers resurfaced in Jim Cornette's Smoky Mountain Wrestling promotion which was based out of Knoxville, Tennessee. It would be here that Smothers achieved his greatest singles success. Now billed as "The Wild Eyed Southern Boy" Tracy Smothers, he made his debut on the October 31, 1992, episode of SMW television, defeating Paul Lee. Competing as a top babyface, he remained undefeated for the remainder of the year, defeating Robbie Eagle, Dutch Mantell, Jimmy Golden, Killer Kyle, and The Nightstalker. In December, he won a tournament to be crowned the inaugural SMW Beat the Champ Television Champion.

In 1993, he began a feud with SMW Heavyweight Champion "Dirty White Boy" Tony Anthony. He lost the Beat the Champ Championship to The Nightstalker on February 8. At Bluegrass Brawl on April 2, Smothers defeated DWB in a chain match to win the SMW Heavyweight Championship. He lost the title on July 17 to "Prime Time" Brian Lee. Smothers won his second (vacant) Beat the Champ Championship for the second time on December 11, after he defeated Jim Cornette's henchman Jimmy Del Ray.

Smothers lost the Beat the Champ Championship to Chris Candido on the January 8, 1994, episode of SMW television. On the June 18 episode of SMW, he defeated Kendo the Samurai to win the Beat the Champ Championship for the third time. He would vacate the championship in July and transitioned into a feud with Jim Cornette's charge Bruiser Bedlam. At Night of the Legends on August 4, Smothers, Road Warrior Hawk, and Bob Armstrong defeated Bruiser Bedlam, Terry Funk, and Dory Funk Jr. That month, he began to frequently team with the veteran Bob Armstrong and defeated Bruiser Bedlam, Killer Kyle, and Jim Cornette in numerous handicap matches.

After winning his feud with Anderson in early 1995, he formed a team with Scott Armstrong, beginning a feud with the newly arrived Gangstas in which they were winless. Smothers then formed a team with the Dirty White Boy as the Thugs. The Thugs feuded with The Gangstas during the spring, but did not get a win until April 13. The war between them continued until June, when the Gangstas departed for Extreme Championship Wrestling.

That summer. an interpromotional war broke out between SMW and the USWA; on June 16, the Thugs defeated USWA Tag Team Champions PG-13 in a non-title match. On July 6, the duo upended Al Snow and Unabomb to win the SMW Tag Team Championship. They successfully retained the titles against Snow and Unabomb, as well as The Headbangers. before losing the titles at SuperBowl of Wrestling on August 4 to The Heavenly Bodies. Eight days later, the Thugs defeated Snow and Unabomb in a loser leaves town match.

=== United States Wrestling Association (1995–1997) ===
After SMW folded, Smothers continued to work for the USWA. Now teaming with Steve's youngest brother Jesse James Armstrong, the new duo defeated PG-13 to win the USWA Tag Team Championship on December 11, 1995, at the Mid-South Coliseum in Memphis, Tennessee. Smothers and Armstrong would hold the belts until January 3, 1996, when they would lose them to Doug Gilbert and Tommy Rich. In January 1997, he joined the USWA branch of the Nation of Domination, changing his name to Shaquille Ali (a take off of NBA star Shaquille O'Neal and legendary boxer Muhammad Ali). After becoming the #1 contender to the USWA World Heavyweight Championship by winning a tournament, he would face the champion Jerry Lawler for the title, but lost.

=== World Wrestling Federation (1996–1997) ===
Faced with an expanding WCW and their own limited talent pool, Jim Cornette suggested that a number of unsigned wrestlers be brought in to flesh out the WWF roster. This ultimately led to the signing of Smothers, Tony Anthony, Bill Irwin, Tom Brandi, and Alex Porteau. All but Porteau were given new names, and Smothers was given the moniker "Freddie Joe Floyd". The name was a rib on WWF agents Jack Brisco, whose birth name was “Freddie Joe”, and his brother Jerry, whose actual first name is “Floyd”. Both Briscos came from Bowlegs, Oklahoma, the same home town Freddie Joe Floyd was billed as being from. He made his debut on the June 29, 1996, episode of WWF Superstars, defeating Justin Hawk Bradshaw, but lost in a rematch on the July 13 episode of Superstars. His first Monday Night RAW appearance came on July 22, when he was defeated by Mankind.

Initially used primarily for television tapings, Floyd rebounded to defeat Uncle Zebekiah on the August 3 episode of WWF Superstars. Smothers made his first Madison Square Garden appearance when he faced Hunter Hearst Helmsley on September 29, winning by countout due to Mr. Perfect distracting Helmsley (and inadvertently becoming the first person to kick out of the Pedigree). He challenged Helmsley for the Intercontinental Championship on the January 5, 1997, episode of Superstars, but lost. His last match as Freddy Joe Floyd came on June 2, where he defeated T.L. Hopper.

=== Extreme Championship Wrestling (1997–1999) ===
While still a part of the WWF, Floyd joined Extreme Championship Wrestling on February 22, 1997, as "The Main Man" Tracy Smothers. On March 15 at Hostile City Showdown he teamed with "The Rookie" Chris Chetti against The Full Blooded Italians (FBI), Little Guido and former SMW rival "The Big Don" Tommy Rich. During the match, Smothers turned on Chetti and joined The FBI (despite not being Italian). Smothers, long associated with being a stereotypical southern wrestler, was billed as being from "Nashville, Italy" or "Southern Italy" during this time. He began doing a goofy dance, that ECW announcer Joey Styles often commented on by saying "what the hell is with that awful dance." Smothers was often mocked by the crowd with chants of "Freddy Joe!" regarding his WWF stint.

Smothers became an ECW regular, frequently teaming with Little Guido that spring in matches against The Pitbulls. On June 7, they lost to the Pitbulls at Wrestlepalooza. Smothers and Guido faced numerous opponents that summer, including Balls Mahoney & Axl Rotten. On October 17, they defeated Mahoney and Rotten on ECW television. A day later, Smothers and Guido upset John Kronus and New Jack to win the ECW Tag Team Championship. As the year wound down, they successfully defended their titles against Mahoney & Rotten, as well as New Jack and Kronus. Their reign however came to an end on December 5, 1997, when they were beaten for the titles by Doug Furnas and Phil Lafon.

On February 21, 1998, he wrestled former SMW opponent Al Snow at CyberSlam in a losing effort. On March 1 at Living Dangerously, he and Guido lost to Jerry Lynn & Chris Chetti. At Wrestlepalooza on May 3, Guido and Smothers lost to Super Nova and The Blue Meanie. On May 16 the F.B.I. attacked Nova and Meanie, coming to the ring to the strains of Frank Sinatra's "New York, New York" (Sinatra had died two days earlier). At Guilty as Charged on January 10, 1999. the F.B.I. (Guido and Smothers) faced Rotten & Mahoney and Roadkill and Doring in an elimination match but were defeated.

Smothers wrestled at both of the ECW reunion shows, defeating The Blue Meanie at Hardcore Homecoming on June 10 with the help of J.T. Smith, and accompanying Little Guido to ringside for his match with Yoshihiro Tajiri and Super Crazy two days later at ECW One Night Stand 2005.

=== Return to World Wrestling Federation (1999–2000) ===
On July 11, 1999, Smothers returned to the WWF using his real name as he lost to former Freebird Michael Hayes on Shotgun Saturday Night aired July 17. This time he worked as a jobber losing to the likes of Rikishi, Chaz, Tazz and Val Venis on Shotgun Saturday Night, Sunday Night Heat and Jakked. His final match in the WWF was on June 20, 2000, in a dark match for Sunday Night Heat losing to Scott Vick.

Later that year he worked for WWF's developmental territory Memphis Championship Wrestling until November 2000.

=== Return to World Championship Wrestling (2000) ===
Smother made a one night return to WCW on January 5, 2000, losing to The Barbarian on WCW Worldwide which aired on January 29.

=== IWA Mid-South (1996–2010, 2016–2019) ===
Smothers would spend most of his career in IWA Mid-South starting in 1996. His appearances remained sporadic over the next few years, but he wrestled and defeated such opponents as Flash Flanagan, J. C. Ice, and Bull Pain. On September 11, 1997, he defeated Pain to win the IWA Mid-South Heavyweight Title, but would lose it the following day to fellow WWF roster member Salvatore Sincere. After wrestling a handful of shows in 1998 and 1999 for IWA Mid-South, Smothers became a full-time regular, and on August 18, 2001, he unsuccessfully challenged Trent Baker for the IWA Mid-South Heavyweight Title at Night The Lights Went Out In Charlestown.

Smothers then reunited with a former tag team partner, Chris Hambrick, as Southern Comfort, defeating The Second City Saints (CM Punk & Colt Cabana) in the finals of a tournament to win the IWA Mid-South Tag Team Championship, but their reign only lasted a day. He participated at the Ted Petty Invitational in September 2008, where he lost to Dave Taylor in the first round. On October 19, during the Double Death Tag Team Tournament, Smothers and Corporal Robinson faced Cult Fiction's Vulgar Display of Power, Brain Damage and Deranged, managed by Halfbreed Billy Gram. Smothers turned on his partner and joined Cult Fiction. Smothers' appearances became infrequent, but he continued to wrestle for IWA until 2010.

In 2016, Smothers returned to IWA Mid-South after a six-year hiatus. On October 6 at IWA Mid-South's Mid-South 20th Anniversary Show, Smother defeated JJ Garrett to win the IWA Mid-South Championship but lost it to Mitch Page on December 22 at the IWA Mid-South Winter Tryout Show. On February 28, 2019, he attempted to regain the IWA Mid-South Championship but was defeated by Aaron Williams at The Heartbreak Ends event.

=== Independent circuit (2005–2010) ===
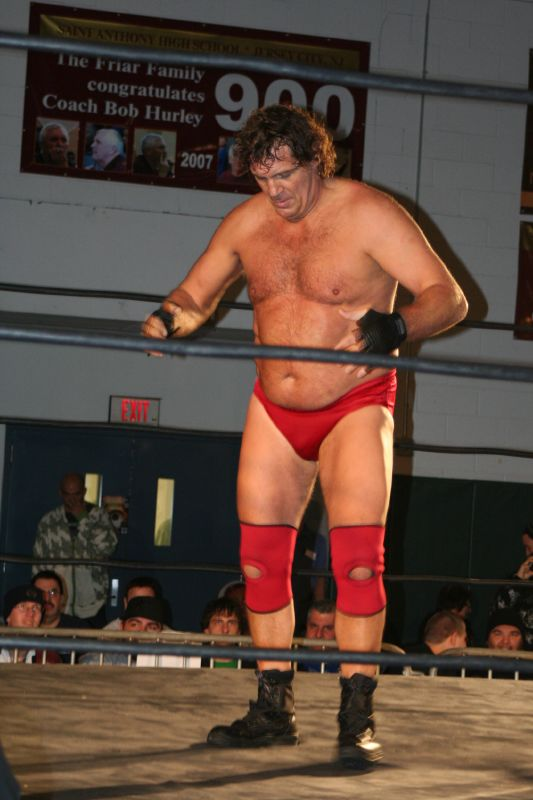
Smothers in 2008

As a veteran of the industry, Smothers had become a well-regarded figure to young wrestlers growing up around him, passing on wisdom in car trips and finding places for them to stay. In late 2005 and early 2006, Smothers worked a full-time schedule at various independent promotions in Tennessee and around the midwest and eastern United States, including the IWC (International Wrestling Cartel), SSW (Southern States Wrestling), WOW (Wrestlers of West Virginia), VCW (Vanguard Championship Wrestling), NWA Wrestle Birmingham and NWA Midwest. On August 25, 2005, Southern Comfort won the IWC Tag Team Championship in a ladder match at IWC Summer Sizzler 2; they would hold the belts until November 25 when they lost them to The Gambino Brothers Moving Company (Marshall Gambino & Mickey Gambino).

Smothers journeyed to CCW (Coliseum Championship Wrestling), where on January 11, 2006, he defeated Chuck Taylor in the main event to win the CCW Heavyweight Championship. On February 26, Smothers was declared the inaugural OPW (Omni Wrestling Promotions) Heavyweight Champion; he lost the title the same night to Taylor. Smothers traveled to CAPW (Cleveland All Pro Wrestling), where at CAPW Seasons Beatings on December 3, he defeated champion Claudio Castagnoli and Jason Bane to win the CAPW Heavyweight Championship. He remained the champion until he was defeated for the title by The Blue Meanie on June 3, 2007.

Smothers competed in various independent promotions in 2008 in the United States, but returned once more to Japan to appear at an XWF event, teaming with Raven and Super Leather in a match against Kintaro Kanemura, Masato Tanaka & Tetsuhiro Kuroda. After returning from Japan, Smothers reformed his FBI partnership with Little Guido and appearing in JAPW (Jersey All Pro Wrestling), where they won the JAPW Tag Team Championship on November 15. The FBI would hold the titles for a month, losing them on December 13 to Azrieal & Dixie.

Tracy Smothers began to wind down his schedule in 2009. He would not wrestle again until April 17, 2010, where he and Chris Hamrick challenged PWF Tag Team Champions Jay Shaft & JD Hogg for the titles in a losing effort. He wrestled frequently for the remainder of the year, appearing in NWA Main Event, IWA Mid-South, BWF, and MECW (Main Event Championship Wrestling).

=== Total Nonstop Action Wrestling (2010) ===
On August 8, 2010, Smothers took part in Total Nonstop Action Wrestling's ECW reunion show, Hardcore Justice, where he, Little Guido and Tony Luke defeated Kid Kash, Simon Diamond and Johnny Swinger in a six-man tag team match. On the following edition of Impact!, the ECW alumni, known collectively as Extreme, Version 2.0 (EV 2.0), were assaulted by A.J. Styles, Kazarian, Robert Roode, James Storm, Douglas Williams and Matt Morgan of Ric Flair's Fourtune stable, who thought they didn't deserve to be in TNA. The following week TNA president Dixie Carter gave each member of EV 2.0 TNA contracts in order for them to settle their score with Fourtune.

=== Juggalo Championship Wrestling (2007–2011) ===
Tracy Smothers debuted in Juggalo Championship Wrestling by cutting a series of promos in which he insulted the company, the owners (Insane Clown Posse), and the Juggalo fanbase. Tracy quickly became the company's main villain by defeating much of their roster and ending most of his matches by choking out his opponents. He attacked hero 2 Tuff Tony in the sixth episode of the internet wrestling show SlamTV!, causing Tony to be knocked out of action for several weeks. Per storyline, Smothers was arrested just days before Tony's return on the eighth episode, leaving Tony with no way to seek revenge. At Bloodymania on August 12, 2007, Smothers lost to Ron Killings.

Tracy and 2 Tuff Tony continued their rivalry into season two. In the first episode, both men faced off in a match which saw Tracy win after a fast count by the referee, who was later revealed as Tracy's illegitimate daughter, Isabella. Two weeks later, Tracy caught Isabella listening to Boondox, the rapper who sings 2 Tuff Tony's entrance music. The following week, 2 Tuff Tony attacked Tracy after his match. Tracy later caught Isabella engaging in sexual actions with Boondox, through storyline, and assaulted him. Tracy and Isabella Smothers were then scheduled to face Boondox and 2 Tuff Tony on August 10, 2008, at Bloodymania II. However, Isabella was replaced by Bull Pain after she injured her leg, and Smothers and Pain lost to Tony and Boondox.

At Bloodymania IV on August 15, 2010, he lost to Booker T, who was accompanied by Boondox. In the summer of 2011 he lost to former ECW star Rhyno on July 28 and former F.B.I. teammate Tommy Rich on August 16, 2011.

=== Return to the independent circuit (2011–2019) ===
Tracy Smothers continued to wrestle on the independent circuit after finishing his work with JCW in 2011. He jumped to Ohio Valley Wrestling on August 31, where he and his daughter Jessie Belle Smothers won a mixed tag team match against CJ Lane & Mysterie. On June 16, 2013, at the Brad Armstrong Memorial Event, Smothers teamed with old partner Steve Armstrong for the first time in over twenty one years. The reunited Southern Boys teamed with Doug Gilbert to defeat Paul Lee, The Storm Trooper & Vordell Walker. Smothers soon captured the D1W Heavyweight Championship, but lost it to Mad Man Pondo while splitting his time with D1W and IWA Mid South.

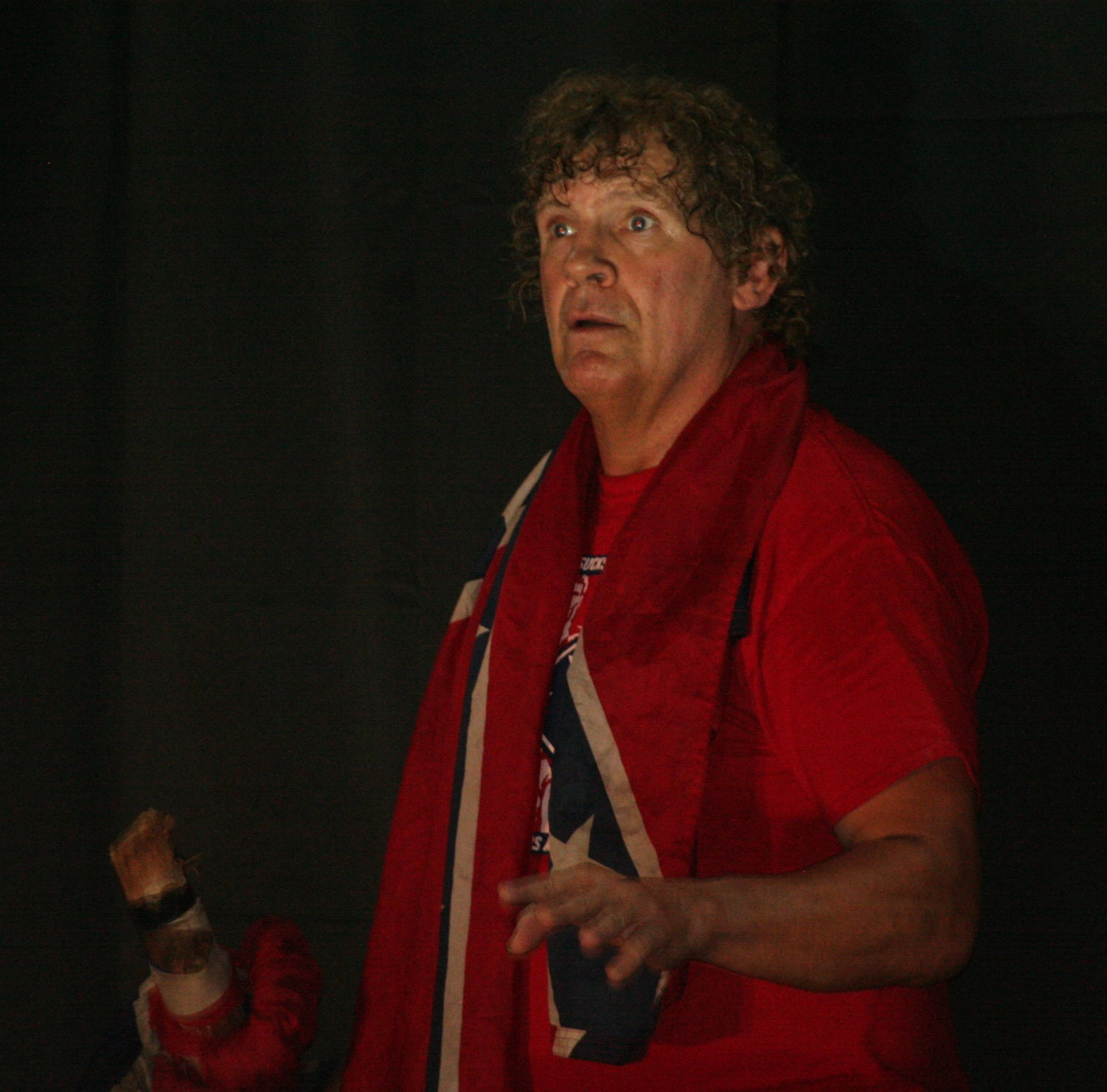
Smothers in 2016

In March 2016, Smothers appeared in HLW (Heroes And Legends Wrestling), where he teamed with Bobby Fulton and defeated Jake Omen & Scotty Young to with the HLW Tag Team Championship. Smothers continued to wrestle frequently in 2017, making appearances in the PWA (Pure Wrestling Association) in Canada, as well as RCCW (Rocket City Championship Wrestling), ZERO-1 USA, and IWA Mid-South. He began to wind down appearances on the independent circuit in 2018, and continued to wrestle shows the following year despite health issues; he had a quick temper due to concussions, and believed he had suffered more than two dozen concussions during his career and suffered greatly from the effects. His final match came at HLW Heroes And Legends XIII on October 5, 2019, dropping the HLW Legends title to Dru Skillz.

== Personal life ==
In July 2016, Smothers was named part of a class action lawsuit filed against WWE which alleged that wrestlers incurred traumatic brain injuries during their tenure and that the company concealed the risks of injury. The suit was litigated by attorney Konstantine Kyros, who has been involved in a number of other lawsuits against WWE. US District Judge Vanessa Lynne Bryant dismissed the case in September 2018.

== Death ==
Smothers announced on his Facebook page in December 2019 that he was diagnosed with lymphoma after he visited a doctor the month prior and had suffered a heart attack without realizing. Despite this, he died from the illness at 4:30 am on October 28, 2020, at the age of 58. A day before his death, he posted that he was back in the hospital after hernia surgery aggravated his condition. Smothers was survived by his three sons, Tony Shook, Kyle Smothers, and Austin Elliott, and his daughter Jessie Belle McCoy, who wrestles as Jessie Belle.

Many wrestlers paid tribute to Smothers following his death, including Jim Cornette, CM Punk, Edge, Frankie Kazarian, Taz, Jeff Jarrett, Ricky Morton, Bobby Fulton and Tom Prichard.

== Championships and accomplishments ==
- All-Star Wrestling
  - ASW Heavyweight Championship (1 time)
  - ASW Southern Heavyweight Championship (1 time)
- All-State Wrestling
  - ASW Heavyweight Championship (1 time)
- Bad 2 The Bone Wrestling
  - BBW Heavyweight Championship (1 time)
- Bloody Rage American Wrestling League
  - BRAWL Tag Team Championship (1 time) – with Chris Hamrick
- Bruiser Wrestling Federation
  - BWF Championship (1 time)
- Celtic Wrestling
  - CW Heavyweight Championship (1 time)
- Central Wrestling Federation
  - CWF Tag Team Championship (1 time) – with Paul Diamond
- Championship Wrestling from Florida
  - NWA Florida Tag Team Championship (1 time) – with Steve Armstrong
- Coliseum Championship Wrestling
  - CCW Heavyweight Championship (1 time)
- Cleveland All-Pro Wrestling
  - CAPW Heavyweight Championship (1 time)
- Cloverleaf Radio Hall of Fame
  - Class of 2008
- Continental Wrestling Association / Championship Wrestling Association
  - CWA Tag Team Championship (1 time) – with John Paul
  - NWA Mid-America Heavyweight Championship (2 times)
- Destination One Wrestling
  - D1W Heavyweight Championship (1 time)
- Extreme Championship Wrestling
  - ECW World Tag Team Championship (1 time) – with Little Guido
- Georgia Wrestling Federation
  - GWF Heavyweight Championship (1 time)
- Heroes And Legends Wrestling
  - HLW Legend Championship (1 time)
  - HLW Tag Team Championship (1 time) – with Bobby Fulton
- Independent Wrestling Association Mid-South
  - IWA Mid-South Heavyweight Championship (2 times)
  - IWA Mid-South Tag Team Championship (1 time) – with Chris Hamrick
- Indie Wrestling Hall of Fame
  - Class of 2022
- International Wrestling Association of Japan
  - IWA Tag Team Championship (1 time) – with Cactus Jack
- International Wrestling Cartel
  - IWC Tag Team Championship (2 times) – with Chris Hamrick
- Jersey All Pro Wrestling
  - JAPW Tag Team Championship (1 time) – with Little Guido
- Main Event Championship Wrestling
  - MECW Light Heavyweight Championship (1 time)
- Memphis Wrestling Hall of Fame
  - Class of 2022
- Midwest Wrestling United
  - MWU Heavyweight Championship (2 times)
- Mountain Wrestling Association
  - MWA Heavyweight Championship (1 time)
- National Wrestling Federation
  - NWF World Tag Team Championship (1 time) – with The Golfer
- New Focus Wrestling
  - NFW Tag Team Championship (2 time) – with "Marvelous" Mitch Ryder and with Johnny Richards
- New South Championship Wrestling
  - NSCW Heavyweight Championship (1 time)
- NWA Mid-South
  - NWA Mid-South Unified Heavyweight Championship (2 times)
- Ohio Valley Wrestling
  - OVW Southern Tag Team Championship (1 time) – with Steve Armstrong
- Omni Wrestling Productions
  - OWP Mid-South Championship (1 time)
- Premier Destination Wrestling
  - PDW Heavyweight Championship (1 time)
- Pro Wrestling Illustrated
  - Ranked No. 371 of the 500 best singles wrestlers during the "PWI Years" in 2003
- Pro Wrestling Unplugged
  - PWU Hardcore Championship (1 time)
- Smoky Mountain Wrestling
  - SMW Beat the Champ Television Championship (3 times)
  - SMW Heavyweight Championship (2 times)
  - SMW Tag Team Championship (1 time) – with Dirty White Boy
  - SMW Carolina Cup Tag Team Championship (1 time) – with Dirty White Boy
- Southeastern Championship Wrestling / Continental Wrestling Federation
  - CWF Tag Team Championship (1 time) – with Steve Armstrong
  - NWA Southeastern Continental Tag Team Championship (1 time) – with Steve Armstrong
- Southern Wrestling Alliance
  - SWA Heavyweight Championship (1 time)
- Steel Domain Wrestling
  - SDW Television Championship (1 time)
- Southern States Wrestling
  - SSW Heavyweight Championship (1 time)
- Supreme Wrestling
  - AWA Central States Heavyweight Championship (1 time)
- United States Wrestling Association
  - USWA World Tag Team Championship (2 times) – with Jesse James Armstrong
- World Championship Wrestling
  - WCW United States Tag Team Championship (1 time) – with Steve Armstrong
- World Wrestling Alliance
  - WWA World Heavyweight Championship (1 time)
- Wrestle Zone Wrestling
  - wZw British Heavyweight Championship (1 time)
- Wrestlers Of West Virginia
  - West Virginia Championship (1 time)
  - WOW Appalachian Championship (1 time)
- Wrestling Observer Newsletter
  - Most Improved Wrestler (1993)
  - Shad Gaspard/Jon Huber Memorial Award (2020)
