= SMW Beat the Champ Television Championship =

Professional wrestling championship

SMW "Beat the Champ" Television Championship
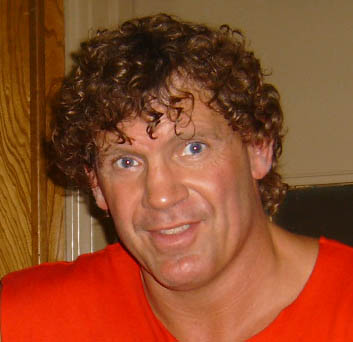
- Tracy Smothers was the first SMW "Beat the Champ" Television Champion

Details
- Promotion: Smoky Mountain Wrestling
- Date established: December 12, 1992
- Date retired: May 20, 1995
Statistics
- First champion(s): Tracy Smothers
- Final champion(s): Bobby Blaze
- Most reigns: Tim Horner/Kendo and Tracy Smothers (3 reign)
- Longest reign: Tim Horner, Buddy Landell (63 days)
- Shortest reign: The Nightstalker, Robert Gibson, Tracy Smothers, the Hornet, Scott Studd, Boo Bradley (0 days)

The SMW "Beat the Champ" Television Championship was the secondary singles championship for the Smoky Mountain Wrestling (SMW) professional wrestling promotion. The title was created in 1992 and was active until SMW closed on November 26, 1995. The storyline concept of the title was that the champion would defend his title every week against a "randomly drawn" opponent. For each successful defense of the belt, the wrestler won $1,000, and if the champion could win five title matches in a row, including the title win, then the title was vacated and the champion received a $5,000 bonus. In reality, the opponents were predetermined, and the winner never received the bonus. Moreover, the title was never represented by a belt.

== Title history ==
Key
No.	Overall reign number
Reign	Reign number for the specific champion
Days	Number of days held
<1	Reign lasted less than a day

No.	Champion	Championship change			Reign statistics		Notes	Ref.
No.	Champion	Date	Event	Location	Reign	Days	Notes	Ref.
1	Tracy Smothers	December 12, 1992	SMW Live event	Morristown, Tennessee	1	58	Defeated Jimmy Golden, The Dirty White Boy and Killer Kyle in a four-way elimination tournament final. Aired January 16, 1993 on SMW TV	
2	The Nightstalker	February 8, 1993	SMW Live event	Jellico, Tennessee	1	<1	Aired February 20, 1993 on SMW TV	
3	Tim Horner	February 8, 1993	SMW Live event	Jellico, Tennessee	1	21	Aired March 6, 1993 on SMW TV	
4	Bobby Eaton	March 1, 1993	SMW Live event	Sevierville, Tennessee	1	49	Aired March 27, 1993 on SMW TV	
5	Brian Lee	April 19, 1993	SMW Live event	Barbourville, Kentucky	1	55	Aired May 1 1993 on SMW TV	
—	Vacated	June 7, 1993	—	—	—	—	Lee won five consecutive matches.	
6	Bobby Blaze	June 7, 1993	SMW Live event	Cumberland, Kentucky	1	21	Defeated The Dirty White Boy. Aired June 26, 1993 on SMW TV	
7	The Dirty White Boy	June 28, 1993	SMW Live event	Buchanan County, Virginia	1	49	Won the title under a mask as The Mighty Yankee. Aired July 17, 1993 on SMW TV	
—	Vacated	August 16, 1993	—	—	—	—	The Dirty White Boy won five consecutive title matches.	
8	Jimmy Del Ray	August 16, 1993	SMW Live event	Clinton, Tennessee	1	28	Defeated Ricky Morton. Aired September 4, 1993 on SMW TV	
9	Robert Gibson	September 13, 1993	SMW Live event	Oakwood, Virginia	1	<1	Aired September 18, 1993 on SMW TV	
10	The Dirty White Boy	September 13, 1993	SMW Live event	Oakwood, Virginia	2	18	Aired September 25, 1993 on SMW TV	
—	Vacated	October 1, 1993	—	—	—	—	The Dirty White Boy voluntarily surrendered the championship, claiming he did not want to wrestle anyone except for Brian Lee.	
11	Tim Horner	October 4, 1993	SMW Live event	Jellico, Tennessee	2	63	Defeated Juicy Johnny. Aired November 6, 1993 on SMW TV	
—	Vacated	December 6, 1993	—	—	—	—	Horner injured by Prince Kharis	
12	Tracy Smothers	December 6, 1993	SMW Live event	Jefferson, North Carolina	2	<1	Defeated Jimmy Del Ray. Aired December 11, 1993 on SMW TV	
13	Chris Candido	December 6, 1993	SMW Live event	Jefferson, North Carolina	1	35	Aired January 8, 1994 on SMW TV	
14	Robbie Eagle	January 10, 1994	SMW Live event	Chilhowie, Virginia	1	28	Aired February 5, 1994 on SMW TV	
15	The Hornet	February 7, 1994	SMW Live event	Jellico, Tennessee	1	<1	Aired February 26, 1994 on SMW TV	
16	Killer Kyle	February 7, 1994	SMW Live event	Jellico, Tennessee	1	28	Aired March 12, 1994 on SMW TV	
17	Mike Furnas	March 7, 1994	SMW Live event	Dungannon, Virginia	1	28	Aired March 19, 1994 on SMW TV	
18	Bruiser Bedlam	April 4, 1994	SMW Live event	Clinton, Tennessee	1	28	Aired April 16, 1994 on SMW TV	
—	Vacated	May 2, 1994	—	—	—	—	Bedlam won five consecutive title matches.	
19	Kendo the Samurai	May 2, 1994	SMW Live event	Harriman, Tennessee	3	36	Defeated Chris Hamrick in a tournament final. Aired June 6, 1994 on SMW TV. Kendo was previously known as Tim Horner.	
20	Tracy Smothers	June 7, 1994	SMW Live event	Loudon, Tennessee	3	28	Bobby Blaze, not Tim Horner, played Kendo the Samurai in this match. Aired June 18, 1994 on SMW TV	
—	Vacated	July 5, 1994	—	—	—	—	Smothers won five consecutive title matches.	
21	Chris Candido	July 5, 1994	SMW Live event	Ashe County, North Carolina	2	34	Defeated Scott Studd. Aired July 23, 1994 on SMW TV	
22	Lance Storm	August 8, 1994	SMW Live event	Saltville, Virginia	1	28	Aired August 27, 1994 on SMW TV	
23	Boo Bradley	September 5, 1994	SMW Live event	Cumberland, Kentucky	1	28	Aired September 24, 1994 on SMW TV	
24	Scott Studd	October 3, 1994	SMW Live event	Morganton, North Carolina	1	<1	Aired October 15, 1994 on SMW TV	
25	Bryant Anderson	October 3, 1994	SMW Live event	Morganton, North Carolina	1	35	Aired October 29, 1994 on SMW TV	
—	Vacated	November 7, 1994	—	—	—	—	Anderson won five consecutive title matches.	
26	Brian Lee	November 8, 1994	SMW Live event	Oakwood, Virginia	2	27	Defeated The Nightmare (Ted Allen). Aired December 10, 1994 on SMW TV	
27	Buddy Landel	December 5, 1994	SMW Live event	Princeton, West Virginia	1	63	Aired December 31, 1994 on SMW TV	
—	Vacated	February 6, 1995	—	—	—	—	Landel won five consecutive title matches.	
28	Boo Bradley	February 6, 1995	SMW Live event	Lenoir, North Carolina	2	<1	Defeated The Wolfman. Aired February 18, 1995 on SMW TV	
29	Billy Black	February 6, 1995	SMW Live event	Lenoir, North Carolina	1	28	Aired March 4, 1995 on SMW TV	
—	Vacated	March 6, 1995	—	—	—	—	Championship vacated when Black left SMW.	
30	Killer Kyle	March 6, 1995	SMW Live event	Lenoir, North Carolina	2	38	Defeated Boo Bradley. Aired March 25, 1995 on SMW TV	
31	Bobby Blaze	April 13, 1995	SMW Live event	Warrensville, North Carolina	2	37	Aired April 29, 1995 on SMW TV	
—	Deactivated	May 20, 1995	—	—	—	—	Blaze last defended the title that same night, defeating Al Snow, after which the title was never mentioned again.	
