= Tiger Ali Singh =

Canadian professional wrestler

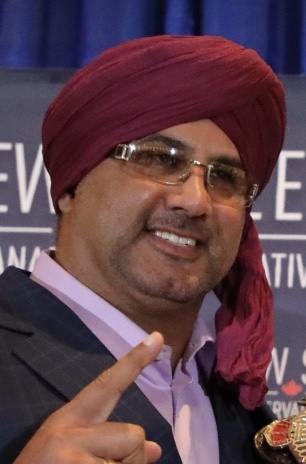
- Singh in 2019

Personal information
- Born: Gurjit Singh Hans; March 9, 1971 (age 55) Toronto, Ontario, Canada
- Spouse: Harmeet Hans (m. 1995)
- Children: 3, including Sajjan Hans
- Parent(s): Tiger Jeet Singh (father); Sukhjit Hans (mother)

Professional wrestling career
- Ring name(s): Mick Hans; Tiger Ali Singh; Tiger Jeet Singh, Jr.
- Billed height: 6 ft 5 in (196 cm)
- Billed weight: 290 lb (132 kg)
- Billed from: "India"; The Continent of Asia
- Trained by: Antonio Inoki; Ron Hutchison; Sweet Daddy Siki
- Debut: November 1992
- Retired: July 1, 2014

Gurjit Singh Hans (born March 9, 1971) is a Canadian professional wrestler. He is best known for his appearances in the World Wrestling Federation (WWF) from 1997 to 2002 under the ring name Tiger Ali Singh. He is the son of professional wrestler Tiger Jeet Singh.

== Professional wrestling career ==
=== Early career (1992–1997) ===
Hans trained to be a professional wrestler by Antonio Inoki in the New Japan Pro-Wrestling Dojo and under Ron Hutchison and Sweet Daddy Siki at Sully's Gym in Toronto. He debuted as a professional wrestler in November 1992 under the ring name "Tiger Jeet Singh, Jr.", teaming with his father against Sabu and Kareem Sudan in a tag team match for Frontier Martial-Arts Wrestling. He also worked with his father for Network of Wrestling in Japan and New Japan.

=== World Wrestling Federation (1997–2002) ===
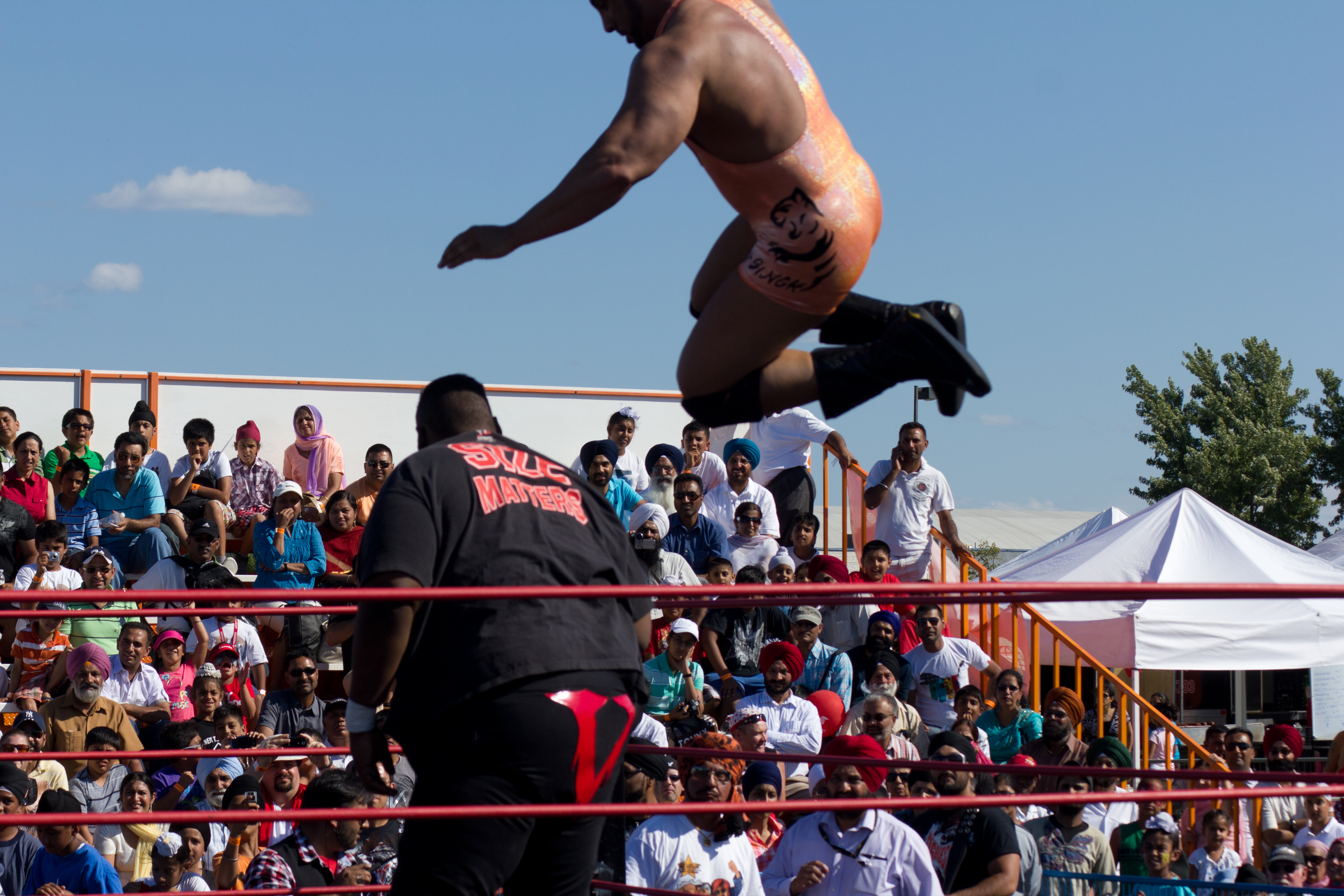
Singh (top) performing the Tiger Bomb on Viscera in 2012.

Singh signed with the World Wrestling Federation in January 1997, with the signing announced at a press conference at SkyDome in Toronto. Singh's most notable accomplishment in the company occurred in 1997, when he won the second WWF Kuwait Cup Tournament, held on April 9, 1997 in Kuwait City. He defeated Owen Hart in the finals to become the second and final WWF Kuwait Cup winner. He made his official WWF debut on the April 21, 1997 episode of Raw. He would also participate and be managed by his father at the WWF's United Kingdom-exclusive pay-per-view event One Night Only on September 20, 1997, facing off against and defeating Leif Cassidy. He would disappear from WWF television in November 1997 and worked in the company's developmental territories.

Returned to the WWF in June 1998 as his gimmick was that of a rich and arrogant Asiatic heir to a fortune (similar to Ted DiBiase's character). He came to the ring accompanied by a manservant named Babu, and would pay random people in the audience each week to perform humiliating stunts. On the Sunday night Heat before Survivor Series, Singh lost to Val Venis and at Capital Carnage he defeated Edge. At the Royal Rumble, Singh competed in the royal rumble match where he was eliminated by Mabel. On Sunday Night Heat before St. Valentine's Day Massacre: In Your House Singh faced Billy Gunn which ended in a no contest. on Sunday Night Heat before WrestleMania XV, Singh competed in a Battle Royal to determine #1 contenders to the WWF Tag Team Championship which was won by D'Lo Brown and Test and at No Mercy, Singh defeated Gillberg.

Singh was later sent to Puerto Rico to work on his in-ring skills. He returned in late 2000 as the manager of Lo Down (D'Lo Brown and Chaz). Lo Down and Singh were eventually sent to International Wrestling Association in Puerto Rico, removing them from WWF programming as The Invasion of 2001 started. Down in IWA, Singh became a two-time tag team champion. He eventually suffered what he claimed was a career-ending injury and was sent home to Toronto to recover. He was later released from his contract in July 2002.

==== Career-ending injury ====
In December 2001 Singh suffered his third concussion in 9 months. He was sent to Puerto Rico to heal. At an outdoor wrestling match, it had begun to rain and Singh went back to his dressing room to change back into his street clothes and the promoter came and forced Singh to go back out to finish the match. Singh was given an ultimatum by the promoter to finish the match in the rain or he would be fired by the WWE. He agreed to finish the match and within 5 minutes, he slipped on the wet ring surface and hit his head. He was knocked unconscious and when he came to, he found himself left alone and sensed something was not right.

In fear of meeting a similar fate of Bruiser Brody, a pro wrestler killed in Puerto Rico for going against the wrestling promoter, Singh immediately left for the airport and flew back to Toronto. Upon arriving in Toronto, he sought medical attention and focused on healing from his injuries. Three months later WWE sent him his termination papers. To this day, Singh believes he was left to die in Puerto Rico.

It took Singh 5 years to fully heal from his injuries. In an appearance on "In Conversation with Amin Dhillon" podcast, Singh reveals the extent of his injuries and how he tried to take his own life twice.

=== Retirement (2002–2008) ===
The following month, Singh filed a $7 million lawsuit against World Wrestling Entertainment. Among his claims were that his career-ending injury was the result of being forced to wrestle in the rain while in Puerto Rico. He also accused other WWE wrestlers of frequently calling him "taxi driver", and that he was the victim of a stunt in 1999 where his dastar was stuffed with garbage. WWE attorney Jerry McDevitt countered by noting that the company was not responsible for any injuries occurring in a different organization, and that Singh's contract could legally be ended if he suffered an injury.

=== Later career (2008–2014) ===
In late-2008, Hans, under the new ring name "Mick Hans", returned to wrestling as a part of the HUSTLE promotion in Japan. He made his return by teaming up with his father in a tag team match against Genichiro Tenryu and Shiro Koshinaka.

On June 5, 2010, Singh won a battle royal for MPW Wrestling.

On September 24, 2011, Singh and Daivari defeated Kaine and Darkko for SCW Wrestling.

On July 1, 2013, at an event called TigerFest, Singh and Harry Smith defeated Big Daddy V, Rhino and Darkko in a handicap match.

On July 1, 2014, at another event called TigerFest, Singh and Rhino match ended in a no contest which led to another match where Singh, Davey Boy Smith Jr. and Sonjay Dutt defeated Rhino, Soa Amin and Steve Corino in a best 2 out of 3 falls match, falls count anywhere match.

== Miracle on Main Street and Tiger Jeet Singh Foundation ==
After witnessing his nephew successfully battle leukemia, Singh vowed to give back to the community. The idea was to collect toys that would be distributed to various children's hospitals while promoting the spirit of inclusion. Every year, Miracle on Main Street takes place on Main St in Milton, Ontario and school children are invited to come down with toy donations and enjoy food, entertainment, amusement rides, and meet local celebrities. Over $3 million has been raised from sponsorship to date.

== Championships and accomplishments ==
- International Wrestling Association
  - IWA World Tag Team Championship (2 times) – with Big Ross McCollough (1 time) and Pain (1 time)
- Pro Wrestling Illustrated
  - Ranked No. 250 of the top 500 singles in the "PWI 500" in 1999
- World Wrestling Federation
  - Kuwait Cup (1997)
