= SMW United States Junior Heavyweight Championship =

Professional wrestling championship

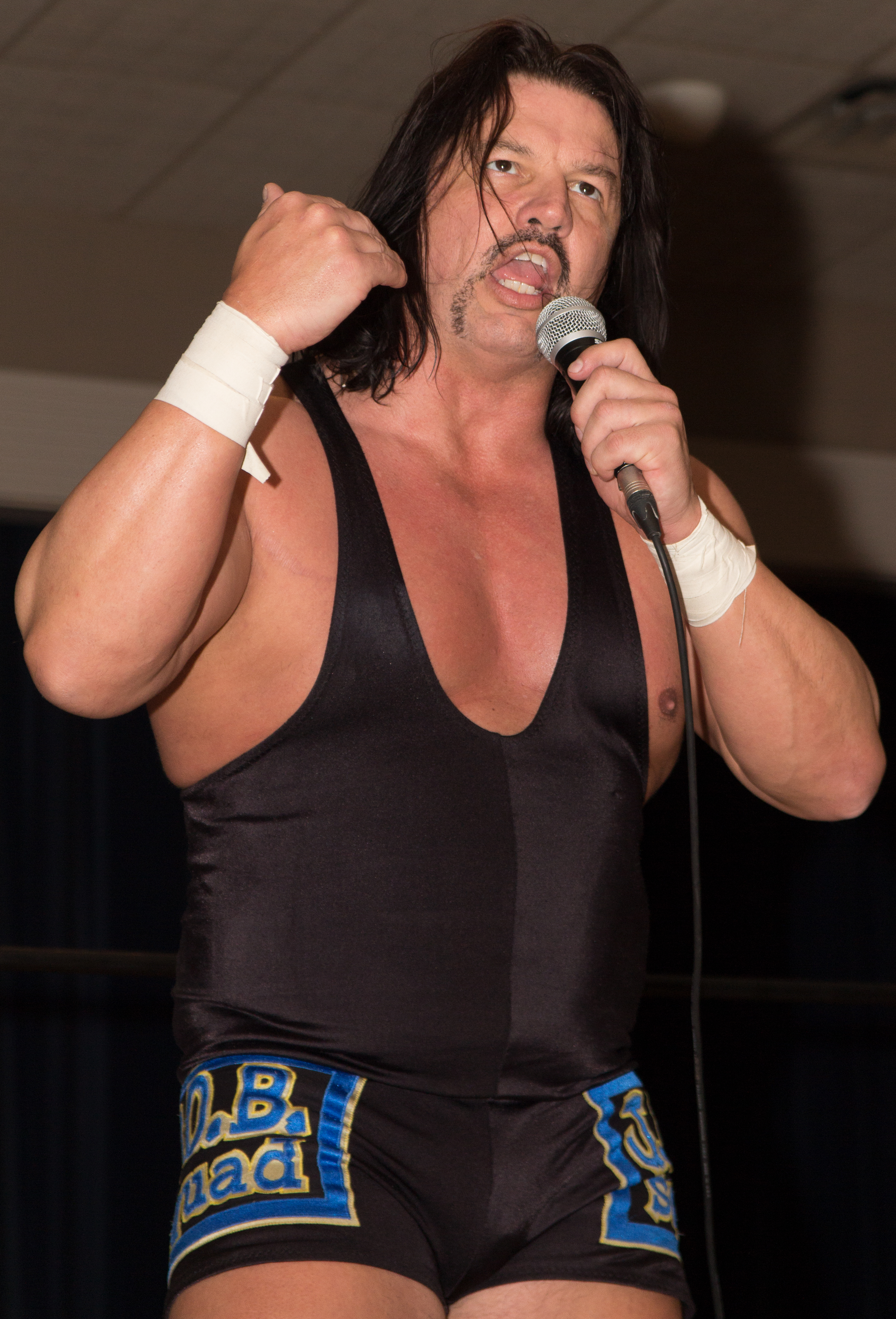
- Al Snow, the 7th over all champion (pictured in March 2013)

Details
- Promotion: Smoky Mountain Wrestling
- Date established: September 13, 1993
- Date retired: July 30, 1994
Statistics
- First champion: Bobby Blaze
- Most reigns: Bobby Blaze (4 reigns)
- Longest reign: Chris Candido (111 days at least)
- Shortest reign: Bobby Blaze (0 days)
- Oldest champion: Al Snow (31 years, 10 days)
- Youngest champion: Chris Candido (22 years, 197 days)
- Heaviest champion: Al Snow (238 lb (108 kg))
- Lightest champion: Chris Candido (225 lb (102 kg))

The SMW United States Junior Heavyweight Championship was a singles title in Smoky Mountain Wrestling. It existed from 1992 until 1994. There were three officially recognized champions and eight title reigns, with Bobby Blaze holding the title a record four times. Because the championship is a professional wrestling championship, it is won and lost competitively. The championship is awarded after the Wrestler who is more “over” wins the match.

== Title history ==
Key
No.	Overall reign number
Reign	Reign number for the specific champion
Days	Number of days held
(NLT)	Championship change took place "no later than" the date listed
<1	Reign lasted less than a day

No.	Champion	Championship change			Reign statistics		Notes	Ref.
No.	Champion	Date	Event	Location	Reign	Days	Notes	Ref.
1	Bobby Blaze	September 13, 1993	SMW Live event	Columbus, Ohio	1	21	Won a tournament.	
2	Chris Candido	October 4, 1993	SMW Live event	Jellico, Tennessee	1	4	Aired October 23, 1993 on SMW TV	
3	Bobby Blaze	October 8, 1993	SMW Live event	Knoxville, Tennessee	2	1		
4	Chris Candido	October 9, 1993	SMW Live event	Barbourville, Kentucky	2	1		
5	Bobby Blaze	October 10, 1993	SMW Live event	Johnson City, Tennessee	3	34		
6	Chris Candido	November 13, 1993	SMW Live event	Morristown, Tennessee	3	(Note: The exact date Chris Candido was stripped of the title is not known, placing his reign between 111 and 133 days.)		
—	Vacated	March 26, 1994 (NLT)	—	—	—	—	Championship vacated when Candido leaves SMW.	
7	Al Snow	July 28, 1994	SMW Live event	Lima, Ohio	1	2	This may have been a fictitious title change. Snow defeated Bobby Blaze.	
8	Bobby Blaze	July 30, 1994	SMW Live event	Ashland, Kentucky	4	<1		
—	Deactivated	July 30, 1994	—	—	—	—	The title was abandoned after the July 30, 1994, event.	

== See also ==
- Smoky Mountain Wrestling
