= Bobby Blaze =

American wrestler and author

Personal information
- Born: Robert Smedley; June 25, 1963 (age 63) Ashland, Kentucky, U.S.

Professional wrestling career
- Ring name(s): Bob Smedley; Bobby Blaze; Kendo the Samurai; D.B. Smedrock; Underdog
- Billed height: 6 ft 1 in (185 cm)
- Billed weight: 237 lb (108 kg)
- Trained by: Boris Malenko; Dean Malenko
- Debut: 1988
- Retired: 2004

Robert Smedley (born June 25, 1963) is an American retired professional wrestler and author, better known by his ring name Bobby Blaze. He gained the majority of his in-ring success performing for Smoky Mountain Wrestling (SMW) from 1993 to 1995, where he held the SMW Heavyweight Championship once, the SMW United States Junior Heavyweight Championship a record four times and the SMW Beat the Champ Television Championship twice. He also performed on the undercard in World Wrestling Federation (WWF) and World Championship Wrestling (WCW).

== Professional wrestling career ==
=== Early career (1988–1993) ===
Robert "Bob" Smedley made his professional wrestling debut on September 11, 1988, after training under Boris and Dean Malenko. In 1991 and 1992, he would wrestle as enhancement talent for the World Wrestling Federation (WWF).

=== Smoky Mountain Wrestling (1993–1995) ===
In 1993, Smedley began working for the newly formed Smoky Mountain Wrestling (SMW) under the ring name Bobby Blaze. On June 7, 1993, he won the SMW Beat the Champ Television Championship by defeating The Dirty White Boy in a tournament final. Twenty-one days later, Blaze faced an unknown, masked wrestler known as "The Mighty Yankee," which turned out to be the Dirty White Boy pulling a trick on Blaze to win the championship from him. Blaze was one of eight wrestlers competing in SMW's "King of Kentucky" tournament, defeating Killer Kyle in the first round before losing to Brian Lee in the semi-finals. In September, he won a tournament to become the inaugural SMW United States Junior Heavyweight Champion, a title he held for 21 days before Chris Candido won it from him. The title change led to a series of matches between the two, including trading the title back and forth between them. The two also faced off in a series of matches where the loser would be tarred and feathered after the match as part of SMW's Thanksgiving Thunder series. On February 26, 1995, in the main event of SMW's Sunday, Bloody Sunday II, show Blaze defeated Jerry Lawler to win the SMW Heavyweight Championship. He lost the title to Buddy Landel on April 8. Blaze held the SMW Beat the Champ Television Championship one last time before the promotion closed. He also had a couple shots at the NWA World Heavyweight Championship against Dan Severn on May 20 in Charlotte, North Carolina, and on August 4 in Knoxville, Tennessee.

=== Various Promotions (1995–1997) ===
After SMW closed, Blaze wrestled on the independent circuit throughout the American East Coast, as well as touring Japan for Michinoku Pro Wrestling (MPW).

=== World Championship Wrestling (1997–1999) ===
In September 1997, Blaze joined World Championship Wrestling (WCW). He appeared in the 60-man battle royal in the main event of the World War 3 in 1997 and 1998. Blaze remained with the company, largely performing as a jobber in undercard matches, until September 1999. He appears in WCW Mayhem video game.

=== Later career (1999–2004) ===
After WCW, Blaze worked in the independents mainly for Cleveland All-Pro Wrestling. He would return to Michinoku Pro Wrestling in Japan. Retired from wrestling in 2004.

== Books ==
- Pin Me, Pay Me!: Have Boots, Will Travel
- I Kicked Out on Two: The Education of a Wrestler

== Championships and accomplishments ==
- Cleveland All Pro Wrestling
  - CAPW North American Heavyweight Championship (2 times)
- Heartland Wrestling Association
  - HWA Heavyweight Championship (1 time)
- Pro Wrestling Illustrated
  - PWI ranked him #109 of the top 500 singles wrestlers in the PWI 500 in 1995.
- Smoky Mountain Wrestling
  - SMW Beat the Champ Television Championship (3 times, final)
  - SMW Heavyweight Championship (1 time)
  - SMW United States Junior Heavyweight Championship (4 times, final),
- Southern States Wrestling
  - SSW Junior Heavyweight Championship (1 time)
- Unleashed Wrestling Alliance
  - UWA Hall of Fame (2013)
