= Rib (professional wrestling) =

Prank played on a professional wrestler by another wrestler

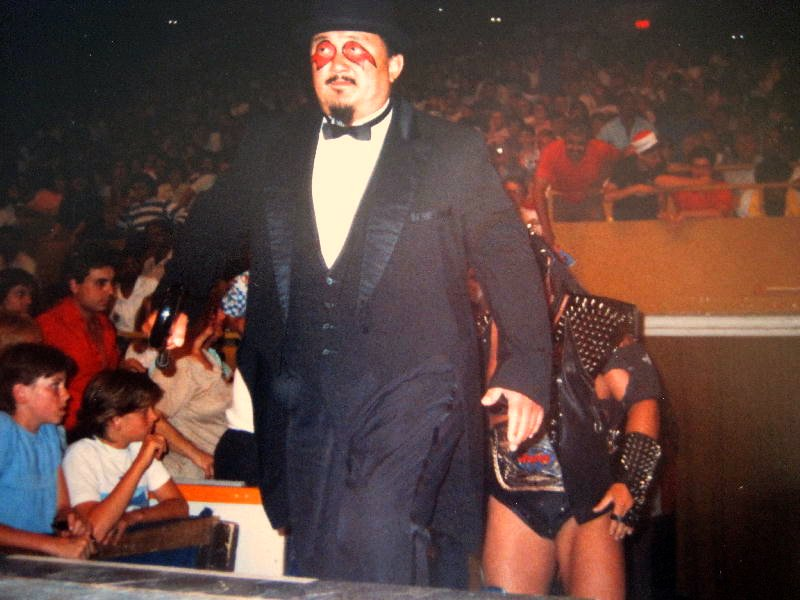
Mr. Fuji, many of whose ribs have taken on legendary status among wrestlers and fans

In professional wrestling, a rib is a prank played on a wrestler, or backstage employee of a wrestling promotion, by another wrestler. Ribs may be practiced as a form of stress relief from the grueling schedule of traveling, experiencing the physical exertion of wrestling, and sleeping in a different town most nights. The largest wrestling company, WWE, are reported to require their wrestlers to perform 4 nights per week, so the backstage environment can become tense and in need of the relief that could be found in ribbing.

== Examples of Ribs ==
Ribs are not necessarily strictly good natured. Scott Hall cites wrestlers including Mr. Fuji, "Mr. Perfect" Curt Hennig, and X-Pac as having defecated in another wrestler's bag or belongings. The situation involving X-Pac has become very well known amongst wrestling fans. He defecated in Sable's bag, ostensibly because she was poorly liked backstage. Hall further states that the same prank was pulled on Alundra Blayze and Sunny and Skip. There is also an enduring legend that Mr. Fuji once cooked another wrestler's dog and served it to him to eat, though the story may be apocryphal. Roddy Piper claimed in an interview that the unnamed wrestler had taken work from Fuji, while Hulk Hogan recalled, on Eric Bischoff's podcast, that Tor Kamata was the victim of the rib, and that his pet cat was cooked, not his dog. Mr. Fuji was notorious for his mean-spirited ribs, as he has been alleged to have slipped laxatives into other wrestlers' drinks, nailed and glued their clothes to the ceiling, cancelled their flights, removed the engine from Bobby Eaton's car, and many others. Jules Strongbow allegedly got his revenge on Mr. Fuji. He had heard that Mr. Fuji was very ticklish, so he tickled Fuji's feet to the point that he (Fuji) was in pain.

Some ribs do not pertain to one particular prank, as such. For example, the ring name of wrestlers Simon Dean and Virgil were considered ribs. Simon Dean's name came from "Dean Simon," which is the real name of fellow professional wrestler Dean Malenko. As for Virgil, he was ribbed by being given the first name of Virgil Runnels, better known by his ring name, Dusty Rhodes, as Rhodes worked for a variety of promotions that tried to compete against the WWE. When Virgil left WWE and went to wrestle in WCW, executives got their revenge by giving him the ring name "Vincent" and making him "Head of Security," as a reference to WWE owner and CEO Vince McMahon.

As with any type of prank, ribs do not always go as planned. When Don Jardine arrived in the Florida wrestling territory, his new colleagues decided to pull a rib on him that they referred to as "The Mabel." The plan was to have a female convince Jardine that she was romantically/sexually interested in him, but that she had a jealous husband. She would then invite Jardine to her house, allegedly surreptitiously. One of the other wrestlers would then pretend to be the jealous husband and scare Jardine off with a shotgun. Jardine had the last laugh, though, when he was able to wrestle the gun away from the "husband" and began assaulting him and destroying the house instead. Another was when Vince McMahon decided to rib Mark Henry by scheduling a match between him and Sin Cara. When Henry discovered that there wasn't an actually a match occurring between the two, he went on a complete meltdown backstage and almost quit the WWE.

Some wrestlers have made it through their whole career without being the victim of a rib, such as WWE Hall of Famer Trish Stratus. Although the examples cited largely occurred in the last century, ribbing is a wrestling tradition that continues. Prior to their WrestleMania 36 boneyard match, The Undertaker attempted to pull a rib on AJ Styles. Undertaker told Vince McMahon that he would participate in the match, but asked McMahon to call Styles and lie to him, claiming that the Undertaker had decided to wrestle someone else at WrestleMania. William Regal is another wrestler who experienced a more recent rib - during his entrance at the November 8, 2011 edition of WWE Superstars, Regal's original music in the WWE was played instead of his current theme. The song played was Regal's "Real Man's Man" theme, a theme he used when portraying a different character: "Real Man's Man" Steven Regal.

== Owen Hart ==
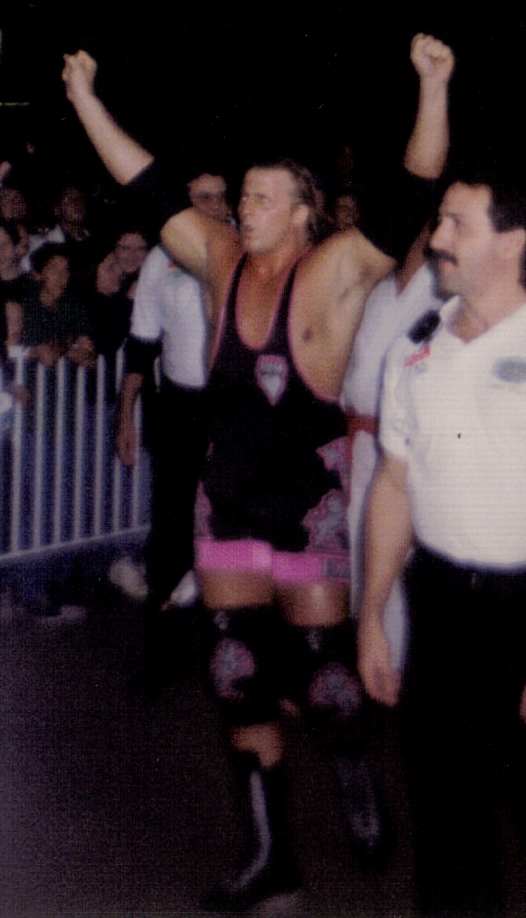
Owen Hart, who was notorious for the ribs he played on other wrestlers

In the WWE, Owen Hart was well-known for the various ribs he pulled on other WWE employees, so much so that a book has been written on the subject. Hart often called wrestler's hotel phone number at any hour of the night, claiming to be an employee at the hotel's front desk. He would tell the wrestler that their credit card had been denied, and the wrestler would often emerge from their room and proceed to let out their anger on the front desk employee, who had no idea what the wrestler was talking about. Jim Ross reports that Owen would call him and impersonate his father, wrestling promoter Stu Hart, in an effort to trick Ross into believing he was speaking with Stu. Ross was also the victim of another of Owen's ribs: it had been revealed that one of the wrestlers had been using cocaine, and it was Jim Ross's job, as Head of Talent Relations in the WWE at that time, to issue an appropriate punishment. That day, Ross spotted Owen with white powder around his nose, in an effort to fool Ross into thinking it was cocaine. It was actually powdered sugar from a donut. Owen also performed a rib on aforementioned notorious ribber Mr. Fuji, in which he put on a fake voice and called Fuji's hotel room, calling him a variety of names and curse words, ending in telling Fuji to come to the lobby, where the "unknown caller" would be waiting to "kick (Fuji's) ass." When Fuji made it to the lobby, in the middle of the night and dressed in a kimono, he was confused, as only Owen was there, who questioned Fuji as to what he was doing roaming the hotel at that hour.

Not all of Owen's pranks were friendly. In a shoot interview, Owen's brother Bret Hart recalled issues they had with George "The Animal" Steele when he was an agent for the WWE. Steele would allegedly charge wrestlers for being late, even by only a couple of minutes. When this happened to Owen and Bret, they stole Steele's expensive watch and threw it into a river. Owen Hart's malicious "ribs" against George Steele continued when he pushed Steele down the steps of a bus. James Romero, in his "Owen Hart: King of Pranks", asserts that Owen forced another driver to lose control of their car at high speed as a rib.

== See also ==
- Prank
- Glossary of professional wrestling terms
