= Al Snow =

American professional wrestler

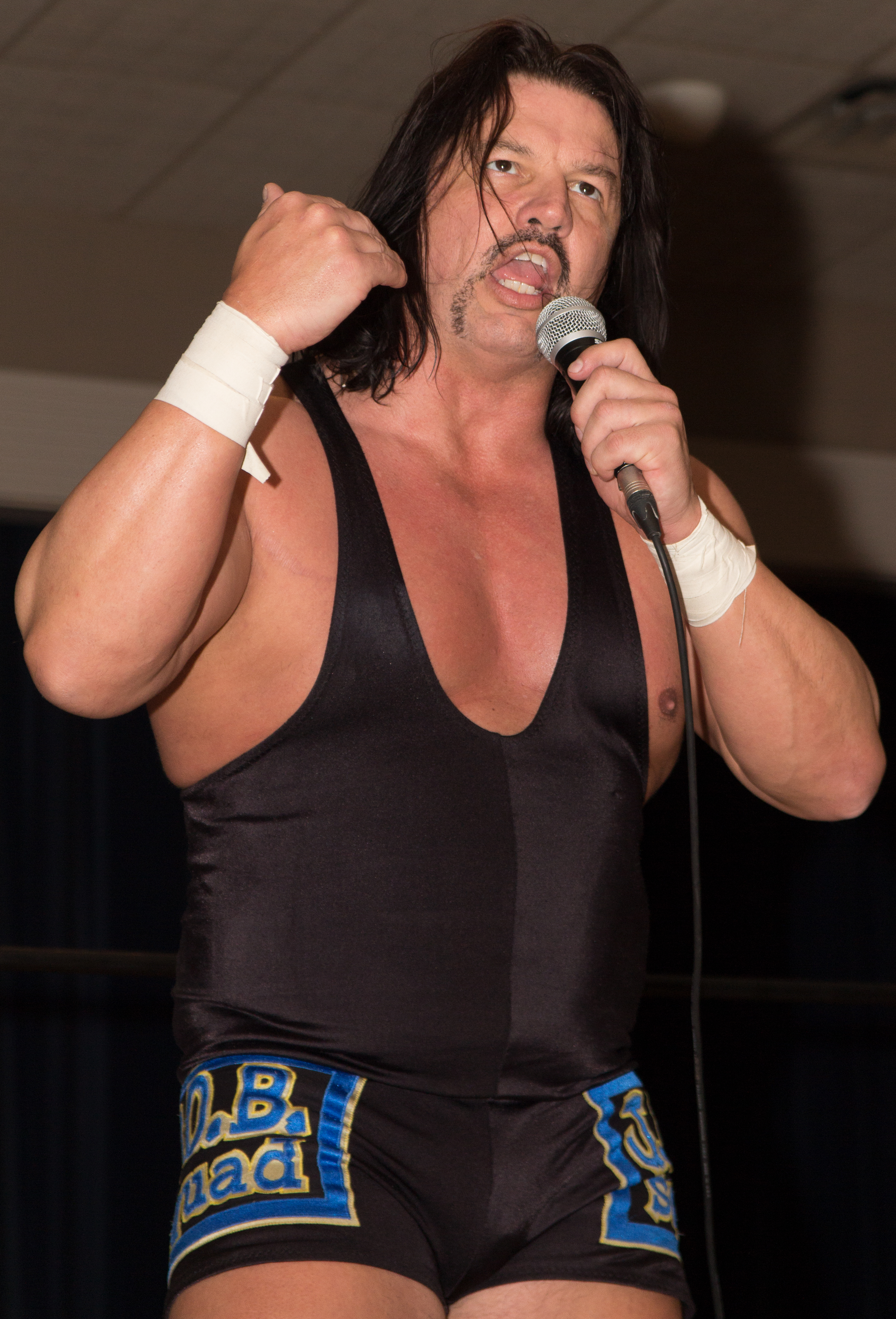
- Snow in 2013

Personal information
- Born: Allen Ray Sarven; July 18, 1963 (age 63) Lima, Ohio, U.S.
- Spouses: Pamela Sarven (m. 1986; div. 2004) Cynthia Lynch (m. 2009; div. 2016) Jessica Gousha (m. 2017)
- Children: 2

Professional wrestling career
- Ring name(s): Al Snow; Avatar; Five Star Ninja; Leif Cassidy; Shinobi; Diamond Dave; Masked Ninja; Small Show; Steve Moore
- Billed height: 6 ft 1 in (185 cm)
- Billed weight: 235 lb (107 kg)
- Billed from: Lima, Ohio
- Trained by: Jim Lancaster
- Debut: March 13, 1982

Allen Ray Sarven (born July 18, 1963) is an American professional wrestler, better known by his ring name Al Snow. He is best known for his tenures in Extreme Championship Wrestling and the World Wrestling Federation/World Wrestling Entertainment. Snow has also held various backstage positions for professional wrestling promotions. Snow worked as a road agent for Total Nonstop Action Wrestling from 2010 to 2017 and has promoted Ohio Valley Wrestling since 2018. His work as promoter of OVW was chronicled in the Netflix docuseries Wrestlers.

== Professional wrestling career ==
=== Early career (1982–1995) ===
Sarven attended a professional wrestling try-out camp held by Ole Anderson and Gene Anderson. There he met Jim Lancaster, promoter of Ohio's Midwest Championship Wrestling, who agreed to train him. Lancaster later described Sarven as "a leader in the ring" who "had drive and natural ability". He made his debut on May 22, 1982. Sarven defeated Lancaster on May 5, 1985, for the Midwest Championship Wrestling title. He wrestled against Harley Race, Bruiser Brody, Kerry Von Erich, Ken Patera, Curt Hennig and Jimmy Garvin.

Sarven wrestled in various independent promotions throughout the 1980s and early 1990s, capturing both tag team and singles titles, but failed to make any big breaks.

In 1993 he competed in the WWF as a jobber losing to Marty Jannetty and The Undertaker under the name Steve Moore. He gained a reputation as "the best-kept secret in wrestling". Sarven helped train future Ultimate Fighting Championship (UFC) Hall of Fame member and NWA World Heavyweight Champion Dan Severn. During this time he would sometimes wrestle as Shinobi, a ninja-style masked gimmick. He wrestled in the November 19, 1994, tournament for the vacant NWA World Heavyweight Championship, but he lost to Chris Candido, the eventual winner of the tournament.

Also fought in a couple of matches for World Championship Wrestling in 1993 and 1995.

From 1995 to 1997, Snow operated a professional wrestling school called "Body Slammers" in Lima, Ohio, employing D'Lo Brown as an assistant trainer. It has since branched out with one of his trainers running "Bodyslammers" in Ottawa, Canada.

=== Extreme Championship Wrestling (1994–1995) ===
After a tour of Japan, Sarven wrestled a match in Michigan against Sabu, an Extreme Championship Wrestling (ECW) regular, who suggested he try ECW. After making his debut against The Tazmaniac and losing via pinfall on December 10, 1994. Sarven faced Chris Benoit as Al Snow, in a 15-minute match that was hailed as one of the best of the year.

=== Smoky Mountain Wrestling (1995) ===
Sarven was also being courted by Jim Cornette for his Smoky Mountain Wrestling federation. ECW booker Paul Heyman agreed to let him work for both companies. Sarven soon found that he was not being utilized by ECW and went to Smoky Mountain full-time. In Smoky Mountain Wrestling, Snow teamed with Unabomb (Glenn Jacobs, later to be known as Kane) as the Dynamic Duo and defeated the Rock 'n' Roll Express for the SMW Tag Team Championship. Both wrestlers caught the attention of the World Wrestling Federation and were signed by the end of 1995.

=== World Wrestling Federation (1995–1997) ===
==== Avatar (1995–1996) ====
Sarven began working for the World Wrestling Federation (WWF) when he signed a contract in August 1995. During his tenure in the company, Sarven wrestled under numerous gimmicks, such as Avatar, which saw him come to the ring unmasked, putting on a wrestling mask to wrestle, then removing it afterwards. The gimmick was based on Mighty Morphin Power Rangers and Mortal Kombat whose popularity the company wanted to capitalize on at that time. During his particularly short run under this gimmick, Sarven's WWF debut as Avatar took place on the October 23, 1995, episode of Monday Night RAW, defeating Bryan Walsh. About a month after his debut, he was scheduled to be the third man for The Underdogs at Survivor Series but for reasons unknown, was replaced by Bob Holly. After this, he started teaming with Aldo Montoya. His two final matches as Avatar were against Sycho Sid and 1-2-3 Kid. He was also to partake in the 1996 Royal Rumble match but once again, for unknown reasons, never appeared. His final match in February was against Isaac Yankem.

On February 20, 1996, Sarven wrestled as "Shinobi", a "ninja assassin" hired by Jim Cornette to dispose of Shawn Michaels, who defeated Shinobi in quick fashion. Avatar returned for one last appearance against John Bradshaw Layfield at a house show on March 17, 1996, at Madison Square Garden in a losing effort.

==== New Rockers (1996–1997) ====
Sarven received his first mainstream exposure with the WWF as Leif Cassidy, the tag team partner of Marty Jannetty in February 1996. The duo were promoted as The New Rockers, a throwback to the original Rockers team of Jannetty and Shawn Michaels.

Jannetty left the WWF in December 1996, and Sarven was reduced to jobbing for mid-carders in January 1997. In the late 1990s, WWF and ECW began to cross-promote their organizations to counteract the success of World Championship Wrestling (WCW); Sarven was one of the wrestlers sent to Extreme Championship Wrestling (ECW). He left in July of that year and went to ECW. His last appearance in WWF in September 1997 was a loss to Tiger Ali Singh at WWF One Night Only.

=== Return to ECW (1997–1998) ===
Sarven found success back in ECW in August 1997, billed once again as Al Snow. Sarven developed a new character gimmick after reading about abnormal psychology and finding a mannequin head on the street near the ECW Arena during a Mummers Day parade. He got the idea to portray an individual with a schizophrenic disorder using the head as a prop for projection. In this role, Sarven received a lot of fan and management support for his J.O.B. Squad storyline, which promoted him as being driven insane by his years as a jobber for the WWF.

In the storyline, Snow, upset at his lot in life, asked Cactus Jack what he had to do to get anywhere in wrestling. Jack said to Snow that to become famous he had to "get a little head" (meaning he had to be willing to sleep with/have sex with the booker). Snow, however took this literally, and thus he started coming to the ring with the mannequin head (with the words "Help Me" written backwards on its forehead, an action Snow himself began to do) whom he talked to as if it were a real person, which prompted ECW crowds to chant "We want Head", an intentional double entendre. ECW promoters handed out styrofoam mannequin heads at wrestling shows, and audience members started waving them and shouting, "Head! Head! Head!" in time to "Breathe" by The Prodigy, his entrance music. The entire audience would then throw the heads into the ring before the match started. The biggest match of his ECW career came when he wrestled for the promotion's World Heavyweight Championship, losing to Shane Douglas at Wrestlepalooza in May 1998. He lost to Bam Bam Bigelow at A Matter of Respect. His last match with ECW was a loss to Axl Rotten in June 1998.

=== Return to the WWF/E (1998–2008) ===
==== Hardcore Championship pursuits (1998–1999) ====
Sarven was recalled to the World Wrestling Federation in May 1998, where he continued his gimmick of talking to "Head", creating some of the more memorable humorous skits of the "Attitude Era" including fighting himself in a hardcore match (which he won by putting himself through a table). He verbally feuded with Jerry Lawler. This led to Snow's first match back at King of the Ring, teaming with Head losing to Too Much. He defeated Sgt. Slaughter in a boot camp match on Monday Night Raw on September 15. Then defeated Marc Mero at Judgment Day: In Your House. He wrestled in a tournament for the vacated WWF Championship at Survivor Series (1998) where he defeated Jeff Jarrett and lost to Mankind in the second round. In October and November 1998, he feuded with Tiger Ali Singh. Snow then formed the J.O.B. Squad with Bob Holly and 2 Cold Scorpio. Later, The Blue Meanie and Gillberg joined. JOB Squad disbanded when Scorpio was released by the WWF in February 1999. Later that month at St. Valentine's Day Massacre: In Your House, Snow lost to Bob Holly for the WWF Hardcore Championship.

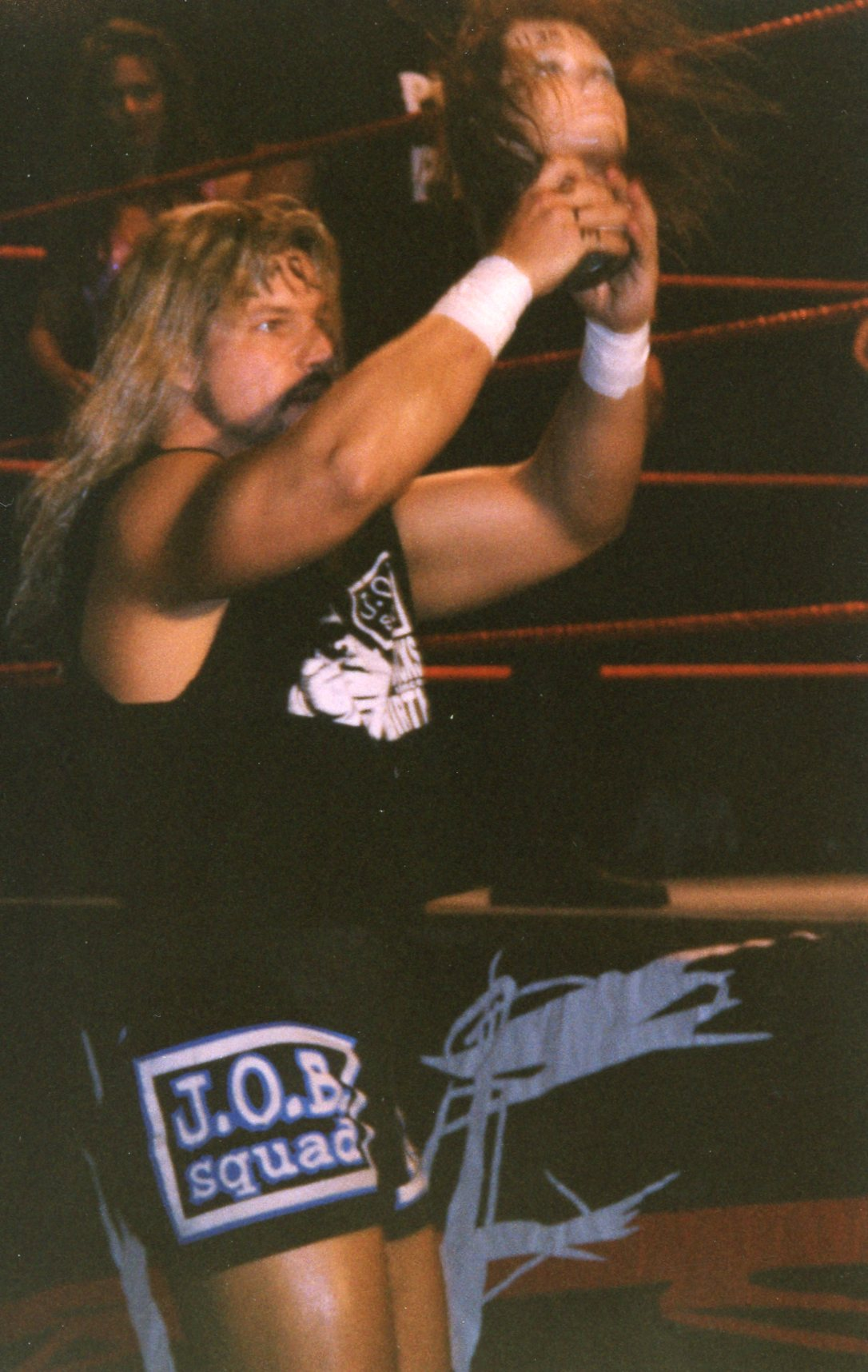
Al Snow with "Head" in 1999.

At WrestleMania XV, Snow lost a WWF Hardcore Championship triple threat match involving Hardcore Holly and Billy Gunn. During the summer of 1999, at the conclusion of a storyline where Head was impaled with a spike by Prince Albert, Snow replaced Head with a chihuahua named Pepper, who he claimed talked to him. A variety of segments were broadcast showing Snow's interactions with the dog, including bringing Pepper to the ring to either "participate" in matches or be held by the broadcast team. This led to a storyline where Big Boss Man kidnapped Pepper. Big Boss Man agreed to return the dog if Snow defeated him in a match for the Hardcore Championship; however, after losing the match he reneged and kept the dog. Later, in a segment on WWF SmackDown!, Big Boss Man invited Snow to his hotel room to discuss the situation, before serving Snow dinner which was then revealed to be Pepper. (In a 2008 interview, Snow said that this angle had been based on a story of Mr. Fuji having done something similar with his partner Professor Tanaka's dog.) The feud culminated at a "Kennel from Hell" match at Unforgiven, which consisted of a regular cage which was surrounded by a Hell in a Cell structure, with "a trained pack of wild dogs" in between the two, and the objective was to escape both cages without being attacked by the dogs. Snow won the match.

Snow received some mainstream publicity in 1999 when Walmart pulled his action figure from their shelves after Sabrena Parton, a professor at Kennesaw State University, complained that "Head" was a "decapitated woman's head" that sent an inappropriate message about violence towards women. Parton was quoted as saying "What kind of message would this toy send children about brutalization of women?" Sarven used the story as part of an angle in which the controversy caused Al Snow to develop depression.

==== Various alliances and feuds (1999–2004) ====
Snow would later team with real life friend Mick Foley in October 1999 and became tag team champions with him for a short amount of time, but turned heel by betraying him due to Foley's jokes about him in his autobiography, Have A Nice Day, and his growing jealousy of Foley's tag team partner, The Rock. He would later turn face again due to fan reaction. Snow was often the butt of Foley's jokes during Foley's tenure as the Commissioner in 2000. However, they are close friends in real life. Foley continued to use Snow as the butt of many jokes in his second book, Foley Is Good: And the Real World Is Faker than Wrestling.

In early 2000, he began to team with Steve Blackman as an "odd couple" tag team called Head Cheese (the "cheese" part being given various explanations, including Snow's claim that Blackman was a voracious eater of cheese and later his attempt to force him to wear a Green Bay Packers "Cheesehead" hat). At WrestleMania 2000 the two suffered a loss against Test and Albert. Also in the same year, Snow won the WWF European Championship from Perry Saturn. He then began a tongue-in-cheek gimmick of entering the ring to various European countries' native music, with his theme song sung in the language of the country, and wearing attire which would suit the stereotype of that country. This continued until he lost the title to William Regal.

In 2001, Snow tried to rally support from the fans to vote for him as the new Commissioner of the company following Foley's on-screen firing by Vince McMahon in December 2000. By March 2001, a match was set up between Snow and Regal to determine the new Commissioner, which resulted in Regal winning. Snow then took some time off from the ring in order to commit more time for the reality show Tough Enough. He made his return to the ring in October 2001 during the InVasion era and challenged Christian for the WWF European Championship at Survivor Series, which he lost.

Snow's last championship reign came on March 11, 2002, when he defeated Goldust to win his last Hardcore Championship. He lost the title to his former Tough Enough student, Maven, a few days later. He was drafted to SmackDown! as part of the 2002 Brand Extension, where he teamed up with Maven. After taking time off again for another season of Tough Enough, Snow returned as a member of the Raw roster in October and eventually became a commentator for Sunday Night Heat alongside Jonathan Coachman. When Coachman sided with Eric Bischoff, Snow followed suit, turning heel. The two feuded with Jim Ross and Jerry Lawler, and briefly replaced them at the Raw announce table after a victory at Unforgiven in 2003. When Tough Enough IV came to SmackDown!, Snow was on the scene and turned face once again.

On April 12, 2004, episode of Raw, Snow dressed up as the Five Star Ninja a portray of Shinobi which he lost to Tajiri.

==== Commentator and ECW (2004–2006) ====
In September 2004 Snow left Sunday Night Heat as a commentator and went to Velocity. He continued to coach for WWE Tough Enough season 4. He did not wrestle any matches for WWE in 2005. Instead, he continued working in the independents.

In June 2006, Snow returned to wrestling full-time as a member of the new ECW brand. His first appearance in the new brand was in the WWE vs ECW Battle Royal at the "WWE vs. ECW Head to Head" special, where he was accompanied by Head. He was eliminated from the match. On the June 13, 2006, debut of ECW on Sci-Fi, Snow participated in an Extreme Battle Royal, which was won by Sabu. Over the next four months, he was used sporadically, mostly as a jobber, losing to people such as Test and Kevin Thorn. Snow was taken off the ECW roster in October 2006.

==== Developmental and departure (2007–2008) ====
Snow then returned with the company as a trainer at Ohio Valley Wrestling in 2007. On the February 3, 2007 OVW TV tapings, Snow was named the new OVW Troubleshooter by Danny Davis in response to Danny Basham's WWE release. On Raw XV, the 15th-Anniversary special on December 10, 2007, Snow participated in the 15th Anniversary Battle Royal where he eliminated Doink the Clown and Gangrel. He was eliminated by Flash Funk. After WWE ceased affiliations with Ohio Valley Wrestling in February 2008, Sarven was released from his position as a trainer.

=== Independent circuit (2003–2006, 2007, 2008–present) ===
Snow was allowed to compete on the independent circuit while under contract with the WWE. Snow would feud with Chris Candido for Northeast Wrestling in Connecticut in the fall of 2004. On May 7, 2005, Snow teamed with D'Lo Brown losing to Mick Foley and Shane Douglas at Mark Curtis Memorial Reunion in Johnson City, Tennessee. In 2006, Snow was pinned by the Millennium Wrestling Federation (MWF) Heavyweight Champion "Sudden Impact" Dylan Kage of Paul Bearer's Trifecta stable at MWF Fireworks On The 4th. Snow would return to WWE's active roster full time in June 2006.

After being released in February 2008 by WWE, Snow has regularly competed in several independent promotions in the U.S. and Europe, especially in the U.K. and Germany. In March 2009, he made an appearance in Chikara's King of Trios tournament, teaming up with Glacier and D'Lo Brown.

On October 21, 2022, Snow and Kal Herro won the OFE Tag Team as the Newest Rockers. Snow wore attire that he wore as Leif Cassidy.

=== Total Nonstop Action Wrestling / Impact Wrestling (2008–2017) ===
In the lead-up to the December 7, 2008, TNA show Final Resolution, Mick Foley assigned himself as the special guest enforcer for the match between Kurt Angle and Rhino. Angle said he had hired "another former World Champion" and someone who had co-held a world tag team title with Foley. This person would debut during Angle's match to "take care of Foley". And on the night in question, Al Snow revealed himself to be the mystery ally of Angle, who interrupted the match by slapping Foley. The distraction allowed Angle to beat Rhino.

In March 2010, Sarven received a tryout as an agent for TNA Wrestling. He made his return to television on the July 15, 2010, edition of Impact!, aligning himself with fellow ECW alumni Tommy Dreamer, Raven, Stevie Richards, Rhino, Brother Devon, Pat Kenney and Mick Foley in their invitation by Dixie Carter to TNA. The following week, TNA president Dixie Carter agreed to give the ECW alumni their own reunion pay–per–view event, Hardcore Justice: The Last Stand, as a celebration of hardcore wrestling and a final farewell to the company. At the event Snow was defeated by Rhino in a three-way match, which also included Brother Runt. After that, he appeared onscreen in his real-life role as company agent on multiple occasions, often alongside fellow agents Ace "D'Lo Brown" Conner and Pat Kenney. Sarven currently holds the title of producer for the company. In Spring 2011, Snow returned to OVW, dividing his time between his TNA duties and work as a show producer for OVW. In November of that year, OVW became TNA's official developmental territory.

In May 2012, Snow began appearing as a judge in the monthly Gut Check segment on Impact Wrestling. The following July, Snow started a storyline rivalry with Joey Ryan, who had been denied a spot on the TNA roster, following his appearance on TNA Gut Check. After Snow tricked Ryan into signing a contract for a match, the two met on October 14 at Bound for Glory, where Snow wrestled only his second match for TNA, losing to Ryan, following interference from Matt Morgan.

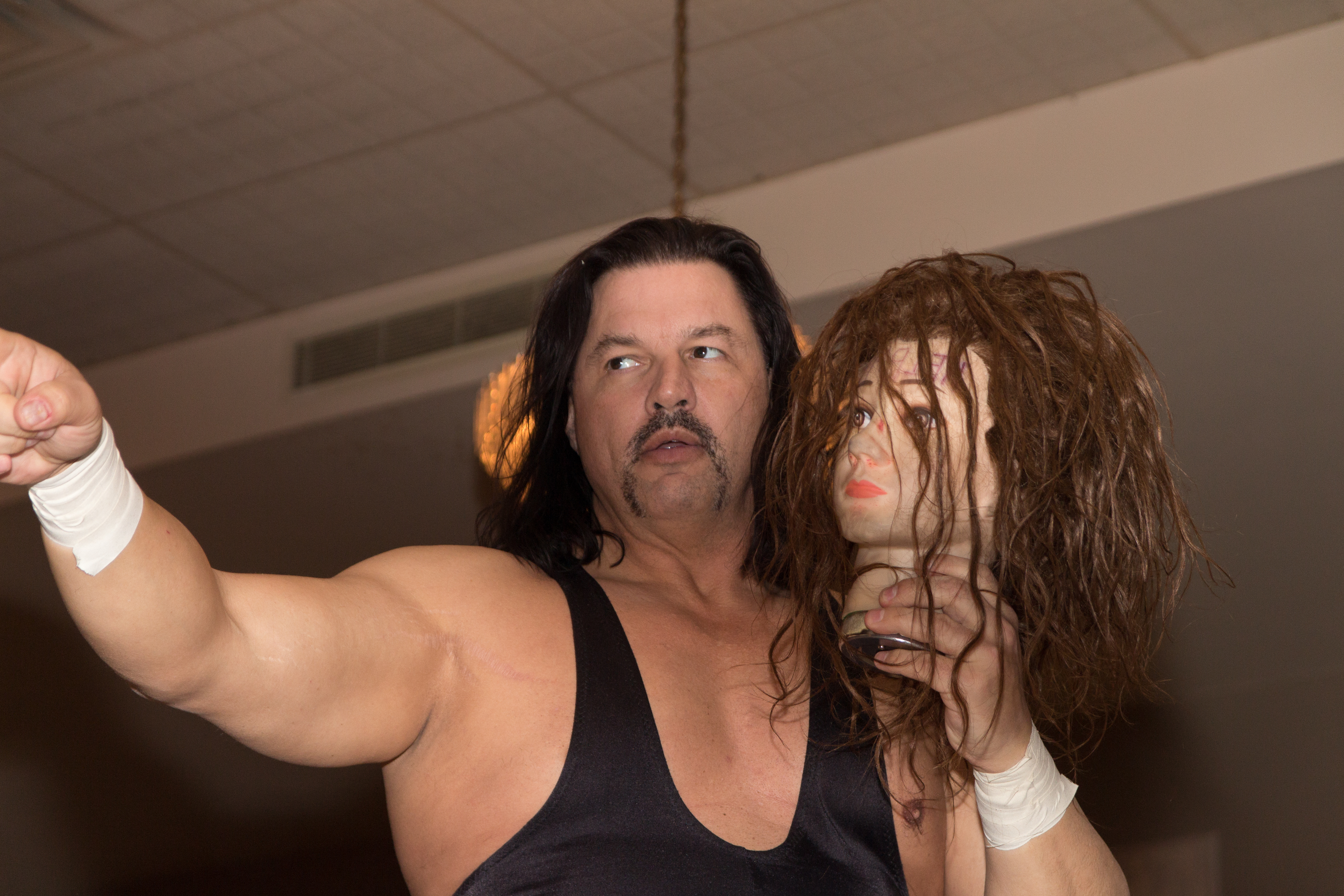
Al Snow with Head at a show in 2013.

On January 12, 2013, Snow took part in Joker's Wild (which aired May 3, 2013), teaming with recent rival Joey Ryan, in a loss against Matt Morgan and Robbie T.

On the August 7, 2014, edition of Impact Wrestling, Snow returned to team with Team 3D (Bully Ray and Devon) and Tommy Dreamer against Ethan Carter III, Rhino, Big Rycklon and Gene Snitsky in an eight-man Hardcore War in a winning effort.

On the February 13, 2015, edition of Impact Wrestling (which was taped on January 29), Snow returned to TV as a heel, where he was seen in the SSE Hydro, calling out Scottish wrestler and British Boot Camp 2 contestant, Grado. Grado would come out to the ring where Snow would give him the opportunity to retire from wrestling, Grado would not take the offer. On the February 20 edition of Impact Wrestling (also taped January 29) Snow would face Grado in a losing effort, after which he would then go on to shake Grado's hand turning face in the process. Afterwards, the Beat Down Clan (BDC) would go on to attack both Snow and Grado, but were saved by the debuting Drew Galloway, would fend off the BDC and who would then stand tall in the ring alongside Al Snow and his friend, Grado. At Bound for Glory 2015 Snow competed in the Bound for Gold Gauntlet. On the March 29, 2016 Impact Wrestling Snow returned as a heel attacking Grado backstage.

On the April 5, 2016 Impact Wrestling TNA Management Director Billy Corgan suspended Al Snow for the week without pay and said next week he must apologise. When Al Snow returned from his suspension week, he entered the ring and said the ease new talents get today with earning respect and a name in the professional wrestling business, drove him crazy as he and others of his and generations before him needed to get some for quite a long time and fight hard to prove themselves worthy back then. He invited Mahabali Shera to the ring and apologized to him for attacking him and Grado, breaking Grado's arm in the process. Shera shook hands with him, only for Al Snow to betray and attack him once they went out of the ring. At a backstage segment, Al Snow said angrily he doesn't need to apologize and explain himself to rookies and if they want his apology and respect they need to defeat him in a match.

A week after, Al Snow had a match with Shera in which before and a bit during the match he has blamed the wrestling changes on the fans and said they are cowards for sitting behind the barricades and not coming to the ring to face him. Shera gave a good fight, but Al Snow eventually won the match. In the May 10 episode of Impact!, Shera and Snow had a rematch where Al Snow played games and almost won with his cheating tactics, however, he eventually failed to win due to Grado involving himself in the match, making sure Shera wins. At backstage, a bit later, Al Snow was interviewed and talked angrily, cursing Grado and Shera in the process. On May 24 episode of Impact!, Al Snow went on to win a back and forth street fight against Grado with the help of the debuting Basille Baraka and Baron Dax, thus forming the tag team faction known as The Tribunal. On November 10, episode of Impact, The Tribunal attacked him until Shera made the save, turning face once again in the process. On December 8 episode of Impact Wrestling, Snow and Shera defeated The Tribunal in a Double Strap Match to end the feud. On June 19, 2017, Al Snow was released from Impact Wrestling.

=== Ohio Valley Wrestling (2018–present) ===
On April 7, 2018, it was reported Snow purchased Ohio Valley Wrestling.

In January 2021, Snow sold a majority interest in OVW to a group led by radio host Matt Jones, and former 21c Museum Hotels CEO and current mayor of Louisville, Kentucky, Craig Greenberg. Snow continues to run the promotion's day-to-day operations.

On August 27, 2022, Snow and Doug Basham defeated Adam Revolver and Joe Mack at OVW The Big One.

Snow was heavily featured in the docuseries Wrestlers, a Netflix released series focused on OVW that was released September 13, 2023. Following the series release, OVW had their first Thursday night sold-out show in eight years.

== Acting career ==
He had a cameo as the Nome King in the feature film Dorothy and the Witches of Oz (2012) with Christopher Lloyd, as well as starring in the action film Overtime, and the comedy film Agua Caliente. He had an uncredited role in the drama film Rudy (1993). Snow also appeared in They're Just My Friends (2006) and co-stars alongside Tiger Chung Lee in Mountain Mafia (2009). In 2006, he played himself in the independent feature film The Still Life.

Snow can also be seen as the brutal serial killer Grim, also known as "The Reaper's", in Feathered Italian Films latest slasher films The Legacy and Hell House. Head also cameos in "The Legacy". He was one of the leads in the sci-fi/action/comedy film Overtime (2011) by director Matt Niehoff.

Snow had a quick line in the wrestling documentary Beyond the Mat. He also participated in the wrestling documentary, Bloodstained Memoirs.

Al Snow also appeared as a coach on WWE Tough Enough (then called WWF Tough Enough) during the show's first three seasons.

On November 10, 2012, Snow, along with several other TNA workers, was featured in an episode of MTV's Made.

Snow completed his work as the "Man in Black" for the independent horror film Lake Eerie on October 23, 2013. The film stars Lance Henriksen, Betsy Baker and was released in Summer 2015. Snow also played "Henchman" in Jessica Sonneborn's horror film Alice D.

Snow has starred as the lead in independent films by Little Monsters Entertainment including Dan Remington in "Unnatural" (Oct. 2024), and Kentucky Joe in "Home-less for the Holidays" (Nov. 2024).

== Business endeavors ==
Al Snow is the co-founder of "Collar X Elbow", a clothing brand for independent wrestling fans.

=== Al Snow Wrestling Academy ===
Near the end of 2015, Al Snow and Simon Van Der Wolf started a training academy, originally based in the UK but since expanded to include branches in many other countries. They along with other professional wrestlers (including Joe E. Legend, Doug Williams, Phil Powers, Jonny Storm, John Klinger, and many more) held tryouts in February 2016. In April 2019, local media in Louisville reported that the academy had applied to the Kentucky Department of Education for formal accreditation as a vocational school. The academy has developed a two-year, 60-credit hour program (on the semester system) in all aspects of the wrestling business, ranging from in-ring performance to writing and TV production. Assuming state approval is received, the Louisville academy will start accepting applications for the vocational program in May 2019 and start accredited instruction that August.

== Personal life ==
Snow has been married three times. He married Pam Sarven in 1986 and the couple had two children. They divorced in 2004. His second wife was fellow wrestler Cynthia Lynch who wrestled under the name of Bobcat. They married in 2009 and divorced in 2015. In 2017, he married his third wife, Jessica Gousha. In 2021, Snow saved the life of a child from an ocean riptide at Santa Rosa Beach.

On April 6, 2026, via his social media accounts, Sarven announced that he had received the honorary tile of Kentucky Colonel. The certificate was signed by Governor Andy Beshear with a certificate date of March 25, 2025.

=== Self-Help: Life Lessons from the Bizarre Wrestling Career of Al Snow ===
On August 29, 2017, Prowrestling.net broke the news that Snow had signed a deal with ECW Press to release an autobiography. Co-written by Ross Owen Williams, who also co-authored Bob Holly's autobiography The Hardcore Truth, the book was released in April 2019. In the press release, Snow said "we want the book to cover more than what I did in front of the cameras. There are so many stories from the road—things that only seem to happen to me—that have made me who I am today. I've always considered every new situation as a potential learning experience and this book will give me the opportunity to share that, for better or for worse."

== Championships and accomplishments ==
- Appalachian Mountain Wrestling
  - AMW Heavyweight Championship (1 time)
- Border City Wrestling
  - BCW Can-Am Tag Team Championship (1 time) – with Denny Kass
- Cal-International Pro Wrestling
  - CIPW Americas Heavyweight Championship (1 time)
- George Tragos/Lou Thesz Professional Wrestling Hall of Fame
  - Verne Gagne Trainer Award 2027
- Global Wrestling Alliance
  - GWA Heavyweight Championship (1 time)
  - GWA Junior Heavyweight Championship (1 time)
  - GWA Tag Team Championship (5 times) – with Mike Kelly
  - Bodyslammers Gym Tournament (1994)
- Great Lakes Championship Wrestling
  - GLCW Heavyweight Championship (2 times)
  - GLCW Tag Team Championship (2 times) - with Mike Curkov & Kal Herro
- High Risk Pro Wrestling
  - HRPW World Heavyweight Championship (1 time)
  - HRPW World Heavyweight Title Tournament (2010)
- Jersey All Pro Wrestling
  - JAPW Heavyweight Championship (1 time)
- Legends Pro Wrestling
  - Inducted into the LPW Hall of Fame (2011)
- Masterz of Mayhem
  - MoM Tag Team Championship (1 time) – with Mickey Doyle
- Midwest Championship Wrestling
  - MCW-ICW Heavyweight Championship (1 time)
  - MCW Midwest Territorial Championship (1 time)
  - MCW-ICW United States Championship (6 times)
- Midwest Territorial Wrestling
  - MTW Heavyweight Championship (2 times)
  - MTW Tag Team Championship (2 times) – with Ray Roberts
  - MTW Heavyweight Championship Tournament (1994)
- Motor City Wrestling
  - MCW Heavyweight Championship (1 time)
  - MCW Tag Team Championship (1 time) – with Denny Kass
- One Fall Wrestling
  - OFW Tag Team Championship (1 time) - with Kal Herro
- Pro Wrestling Illustrated
  - Ranked No. 52 of the top 500 singles wrestlers in the PWI 500 in 1999
  - Ranked No. 329 of the top 500 singles wrestlers during the "PWI Years" in 2003
- Pro Wrestling Ulster
  - PWU Championship (1 time)
- Qatar Pro Wrestling
  - QPW Tag Team Championship (1 time) – with Apolo
- Smoky Mountain Wrestling
  - SMW Tag Team Championship (1 time) – with Unabomb
  - SMW United States Junior Heavyweight Championship (1 time)
- Squared Circle Expo
  - SCX Tag Team Championship (1 time) - with Kal Herro
- Top of the World Wrestling
  - TOW Tag Team Championship (1 time) – with Pierre Carl Ouellet
- Ultimate Wrestling Experience
  - UWE United States Championship (1 time)
- Universal Championship Wrestling
  - UCW Heavyweight Championship (1 time)
- USA Pro Wrestling
  - USA Pro Heavyweight Championship (1 time)
- USA Xtreme Wrestling
  - UXW Heavyweight Championship (1 time)
- Zona de Combate – Federacion Nacional de Lucha Libre (Chile)
  - ZDC Heavyweight Championship (1 time)
- Wrestling Observer Newsletter
  - Most Underrated (1996)
  - Worst Worked Match of the Year (1999) vs. the Big Boss Man in a Kennel from Hell match at Unforgiven
- World Wrestling Alliance
  - WWA Heavyweight Championship (1 time)
- World Wrestling Association
  - WWA World Tag Team Championship (1 time) – with Mickey Doyle
- World Wrestling Federation
  - WWF European Championship (1 time)
  - WWF Hardcore Championship (6 times)
  - WWF Tag Team Championship (1 time) – with Mankind
