= Chris Candido =

American professional wrestler (1972–2005)

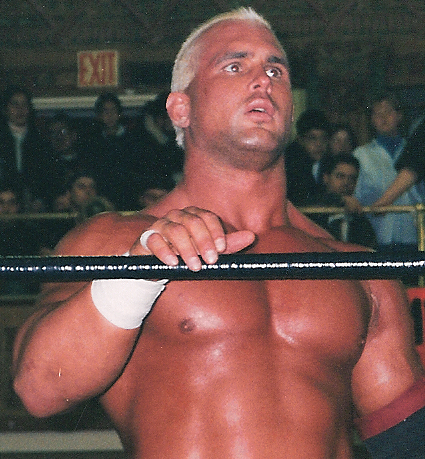
- Candido in 1998

Personal information
- Born: Christopher Barrett Candito; March 21, 1972 Edison, New Jersey, U.S.
- Died: April 28, 2005 (aged 33) New Brunswick, New Jersey, U.S.
- Cause of death: Acute pneumonia brought on by surgery
- Life partner: Tammy Lynn Sytch (1990–2005)
- Family: Johnny Candido (brother)

Professional wrestling career
- Ring name(s): Chris Candido; Sir Christopher Candido; Skip
- Billed height: 5 ft 8 in (1.73 m)
- Billed weight: 225 lb (102 kg)
- Billed from: Asbury Park, New Jersey; Spring Lake, New Jersey
- Trained by: Larry Sharpe
- Debut: 1986

Christopher Barrett Candito (March 21, 1972 – April 28, 2005) was an American professional wrestler. Candito is best remembered for his tenures with promotions such as World Championship Wrestling (WCW), Extreme Championship Wrestling (ECW), New Japan Pro-Wrestling (NJPW), Total Nonstop Action Wrestling (TNA), and Smoky Mountain Wrestling, where he performed under the ring name Chris Candido, as well as for his appearances in the World Wrestling Federation (WWF; now known as WWE) under the ring name Skip, one-half of the tag team The Bodydonnas. For much of his career, he performed alongside his real-life partner, Tammy "Sunny" Sytch, who acted as his valet.

During his career, Candito held professional wrestling championships such as the NWA World Heavyweight Championship, WWF World Tag Team Championship, ECW World Tag Team Championship, and WCW Cruiserweight Championship. When he died, he was the reigning NWA Midwest Heavyweight Champion.

== Early life ==
Candito was the grandson of "Popeye" Chuck Richards, a wrestler for the World Wide Wrestling Federation (WWWF) from 1966 to 1974, as the WWF was known prior to 1979. He started training at age 14 with Larry Sharpe and wrestled for Sharpe's World Wrestling Association.

While attending Red Bank Catholic High School, he met and fell in love with Tammy Lynn Sytch, and the two began a lifelong relationship. Sytch would later become his valet.

== Professional wrestling career ==
=== Early career (1986–1992) ===
As a teenager, Candito and his friend Jonathan Rechner began working for independent professional wrestling promotions in New Jersey, setting up the wrestling rings. Candito and Rechner trained to wrestle at Larry Sharpe's Monster Factory in Bellmawr, New Jersey, with Candito making his debut in 1986.

=== Smoky Mountain Wrestling (1992–1995) ===
==== Championship reigns (1992–1994) ====
In 1992, Candido and Sytch (billed as "Tamara Fytch") were signed by Jim Cornette for his Smoky Mountain Wrestling (SMW) promotion.

Between September and November 1993, Candido won the SMW United States Junior Heavyweight Championship on three occasions, trading the title with Bobby Blaze. He went on to win the SMW Beat the Champ Television Championship in December 1993 and again in July 1994.

In 1994, Candido formed a tag team with Brian Lee, with Fytch managing the duo. On April 23, 1994, Candido and Lee defeated The Rock 'n' Roll Express to win the SMW Tag Team Championship. They held the titles until August 5, 1994, when they lost to The Rock 'n' Roll Express. Candido and Lee regained the titles the next day, but lost them for a second and final time on August 8, 1994. Following the second loss, Fytch fired Lee and began exclusively managing Candido.

==== NWA World Heavyweight Champion (1994–1995) ====
On November 19, 1994, Candido won a 10-man tournament, defeating Al Snow, Dirty White Boy, and Tracy Smothers to win the NWA World Heavyweight Championship, which had been vacated by Shane Douglas and ECW that August when Douglas won it in a separate tournament. Candido's reign came at a time when exposure for the National Wrestling Alliance was limited, as there was no national television outlet for the organization's remaining affiliates. His title defense matches were mostly held in SMW and on the independent circuit. Candido dropped the title to Dan Severn on February 24, 1995.

In late 1994, Candido formed a tag team with Boo Bradley (a parody of the To Kill a Mockingbird character Boo Radley). At "Christmas Chaos" on December 28, 1994, Candido attacked Bradley after they lost a bout to Tracy Smothers and Cactus Jack. In a controversial angle, Fytch kidnapped Bradley's pet cat, Boots, and brought a bag supposedly containing the cat to the ring, which Candido then leg dropped, (kayfabe) killing Boots. The angle led to a feud between Candido and Bradley, which culminated in a loser leaves town dog collar match at Sunday Bloody Sunday II on February 26, 1995, that was won by Bradley. This marked Candido's final appearance in SMW before he and Fytch joined the World Wrestling Federation.

=== Eastern Championship Wrestling (1993) ===
In 1993, Candito began wrestling as Chris Candido for Eastern Championship Wrestling (ECW), where he formed a stable called "The Suicide Blonds" with Johnny Hotbody and Chris Michaels. Wrestling under the Freebird Rule, the Suicide Blondes trio had two stints as the ECW Tag Team Champions in April and May 1993, first defeating Tony Stetson and Larry Winters and then losing the titles to The Super Destroyers, only to regain them the same evening. They vacated the ECW Tag Team Championship in July 1993 when Candido left the promotion.

=== World Wrestling Federation (1995–1996) ===
In 1995, Candido and Sytch were signed by the World Wrestling Federation, with Candido renamed "Skip" and Sytch renamed "Sunny". Debuting on WWF television in May 1995, the duo were given the gimmick of a pair of arrogant fitness gurus who would mock their opponents and members of the audience for being unfit, with Candido performing push-ups during his matches.

In July 1995, Candido began feuding with Barry Horowitz, a career jobber, after Horowitz scored an upset victory over him on an episode of WWF Wrestling Challenge using a roll-up while Candido performed push-ups. Candido faced Horowitz in a bout at SummerSlam on August 27, 1995, with Horowitz once again defeating Candido.

In late-1995, the portly Rad Radford joined Candido as a "Bodydonna in training". At Survivor Series on November 19, 1995, "The Bodydonnas" (Candido, Tom Prichard, Radford and The 1-2-3 Kid) teamed together to defeat "The Underdogs" (Horowitz, Hakushi, Bob Holly and Marty Jannetty), with Skip personally eliminating Bob Holly with a schoolboy rollup, but getting pinned by Jannetty with a top-rope powerbomb. On the December 23, 1995, episode of WWF Superstars of Wrestling, Sunny "fired" Radford after he and Candido lost to WWF World Tag Team Champions The Smoking Gunns. On the January 6, 1996, episode of WWF Superstars of Wrestling, Candido defeated Radford with the assistance of Prichard, who had been repackaged as Candido's cousin, "Zip". Skip and Zip began teaming together as The Bodydonnas, with Sunny as their manager.

On January 21, 1996, at the Royal Rumble, The Bodydonnas unsuccessfully challenged The Smoking Gunns for the WWF World Tag Team Championship. In February 1996, The Smoking Gunns forfeited the WWF World Tag Team Championship after Billy Gunn sustained a neck injury. The Bodydonnas won a tournament for the vacant titles, defeating The Godwinns on March 31, 1996, in the finals of the WrestleMania XII pre-show, after Sunny ran interference. They held the titles until May 19, 1996, when they were defeated by The Godwinns. Following their loss, Sunny left The Bodydonnas and briefly aligned herself with The Godwinns before joining The Smoking Gunns.

Following the departure of Sunny, The Bodydonnas would eventually turn face, and announced that they were seeking a new manager. At King of the Ring on June 23, 1996, they introduced their new manager, the transvestite "Cloudy" (portrayed by Candido's friend Jimmy Shoulders).

In late-1996, Candido left the WWF and rejoined Eastern Championship Wrestling, which had since been renamed Extreme Championship Wrestling.

=== Extreme Championship Wrestling (1996–1999) ===
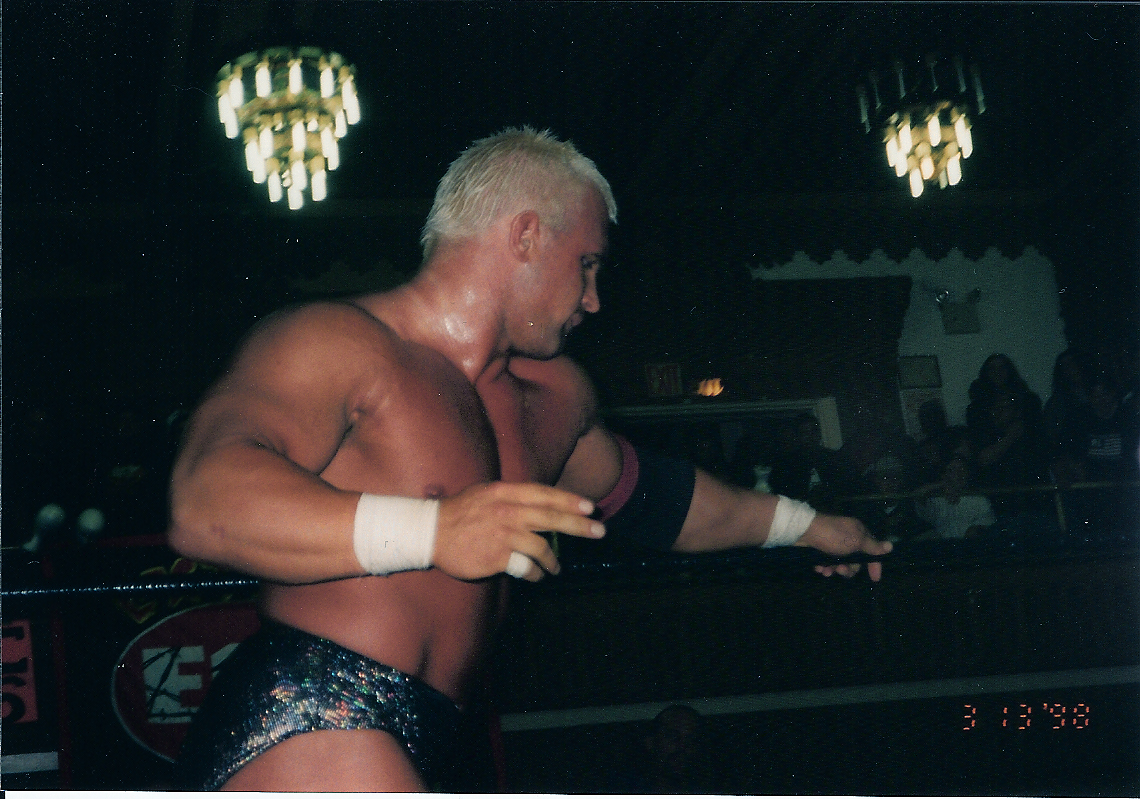
Candido in ECW in 1998

After leaving the WWF, Candido returned to ECW at High Incident in October 1996. He became part of the revived Triple Threat stable alongside Shane Douglas. While in the Triple Threat with the nickname "No Gimmicks Needed", he developed a rivalry with fellow member Lance Storm, who was soon replaced by Bam Bam Bigelow. However, Candido teamed with Storm to win the ECW Tag Team Championship on December 5, 1997, at Better Than Ever, from Doug Furnas and Phil Lafon. Despite being a reluctant team who hated each other, Candido and Storm had a lengthy championship run. The duo held the titles for approximately six months until they lost them on June 26, 1998, to Sabu and Rob Van Dam.

Candido made his final appearance with ECW in December 1999.

He was supposed to show up at the One Night Stand Pay-per-view for a match but he died two months beforehand.

=== World Championship Wrestling (2000) ===
In March 2000, Candido debuted in World Championship Wrestling (WCW). He immediately began competing in the cruiserweight division, winning the vacant WCW Cruiserweight Championship in a six-way match at Spring Stampede on April 16, 2000, by pinning The Artist with assistance from the debuting Tammy Lynn Sytch. On the following episode of WCW Monday Nitro, Candido and Sytch defeated The Artist and his valet Paisley in a mixed tag team match. At Slamboree, Candido successfully defended his title against The Artist. His reign lasted until May 15, 2000, when he and Sytch faced Crowbar and Daffney in a mixed tag team match with Candido's title on the line, with Daffney pinning Sytch to become the new Cruiserweight Champion.

In June 2000, Candido briefly aligned himself with The New Blood before reforming the Triple Threat with Shane Douglas and Bam Bam Bigelow. He left WCW later that month.

=== Independent circuit (2000–2005) ===
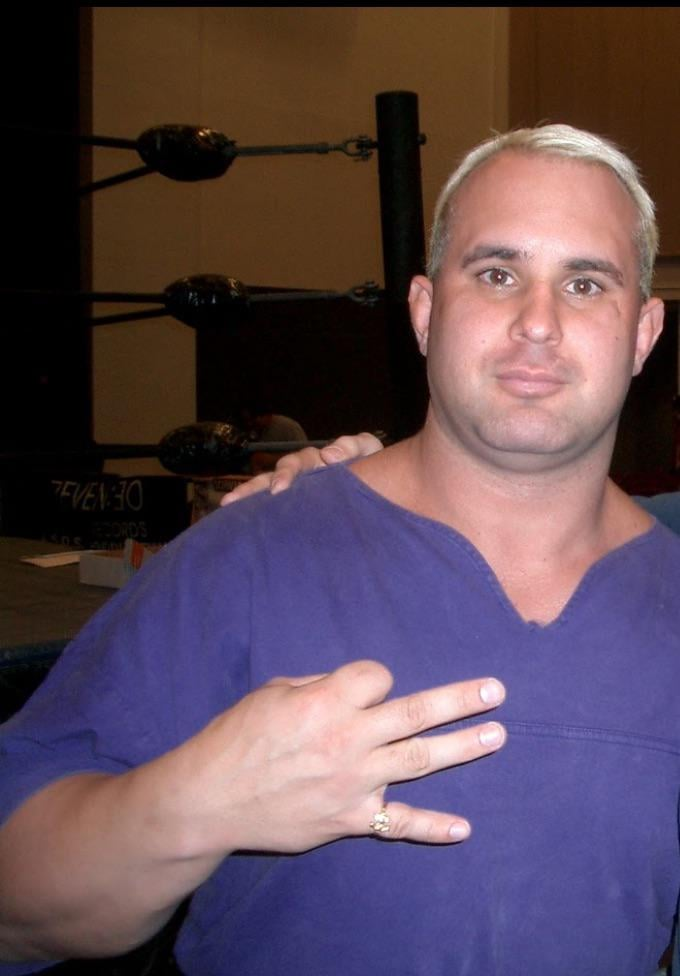
Candido in 2003

Candido had two runs with Xtreme Pro Wrestling (XPW). The first was in 2000, and he won the XPW World Heavyweight Championship before leaving for WCW. The second run was from late 2002 until the company's final show in 2003. Candido and Tammy Sytch also wrestled in Puerto Rico for the World Wrestling Council in 2003 feuding with Primo Colon and in addition held the WWC World Television title.

=== New Japan Pro-Wrestling (2001–2002) ===
Candido wrestled for New Japan Pro-Wrestling in 2001 and 2002.

=== Total Nonstop Action Wrestling (2005) ===
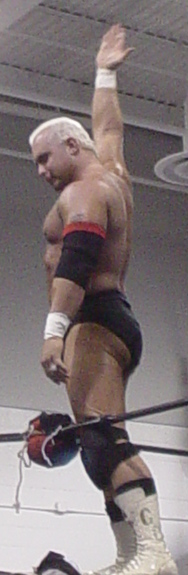
Candido standing on the turnbuckles at an NWA Cyberspace show in 2005

Candido debuted in Total Nonstop Action Wrestling (TNA) in January 2005, when Candido faced AJ Styles in a losing effort. On the January 14 episode of Impact!, Candido lost to Dustin Rhodes. On the Final Resolution preshow, Candido defeated Cassidy Riley. On the January 28 episode of Impact!, Candido defeated Sonny Siaki. On the February 11 episode of Impact, Candido lost to Diamond Dallas Page. On the February 18 episode of Impact!, Candido defeated Shark Boy and Chris Sabin in a Triple Threat match. On the February 25 episode of Impact!, Candido lost to Elix Skipper. On the March 4 episode of Impact!, Candido and The Naturals (Andy Douglas and Chase Stevens) defeated Elix Skipper, Petey Williams, and Mikey Batts in a six-man tag team match. At the Destination X preshow, Candido and Andy Douglas defeated Lex Lovett and Buck Quartermain. On the March 18 episode of Impact!, Candido and The Naturals lost to Dustin Rhodes and America's Most Wanted. Candido competed in his final match at Lockdown when he and Lance Hoyt faced Apolo and Sonny Siaki in a losing effort. During the match, Candido broke his leg when Siaki landed on it after a flying dropkick early in the match. The injury would lead to Candido dying of acute pneumonia on April 28, 2005. His last performance was taped to air later in the week, as he was featured on an episode of TNA Impact! after his death, using a wheelchair, where he helped The Naturals win the NWA World Tag Team Championships.

== Death ==
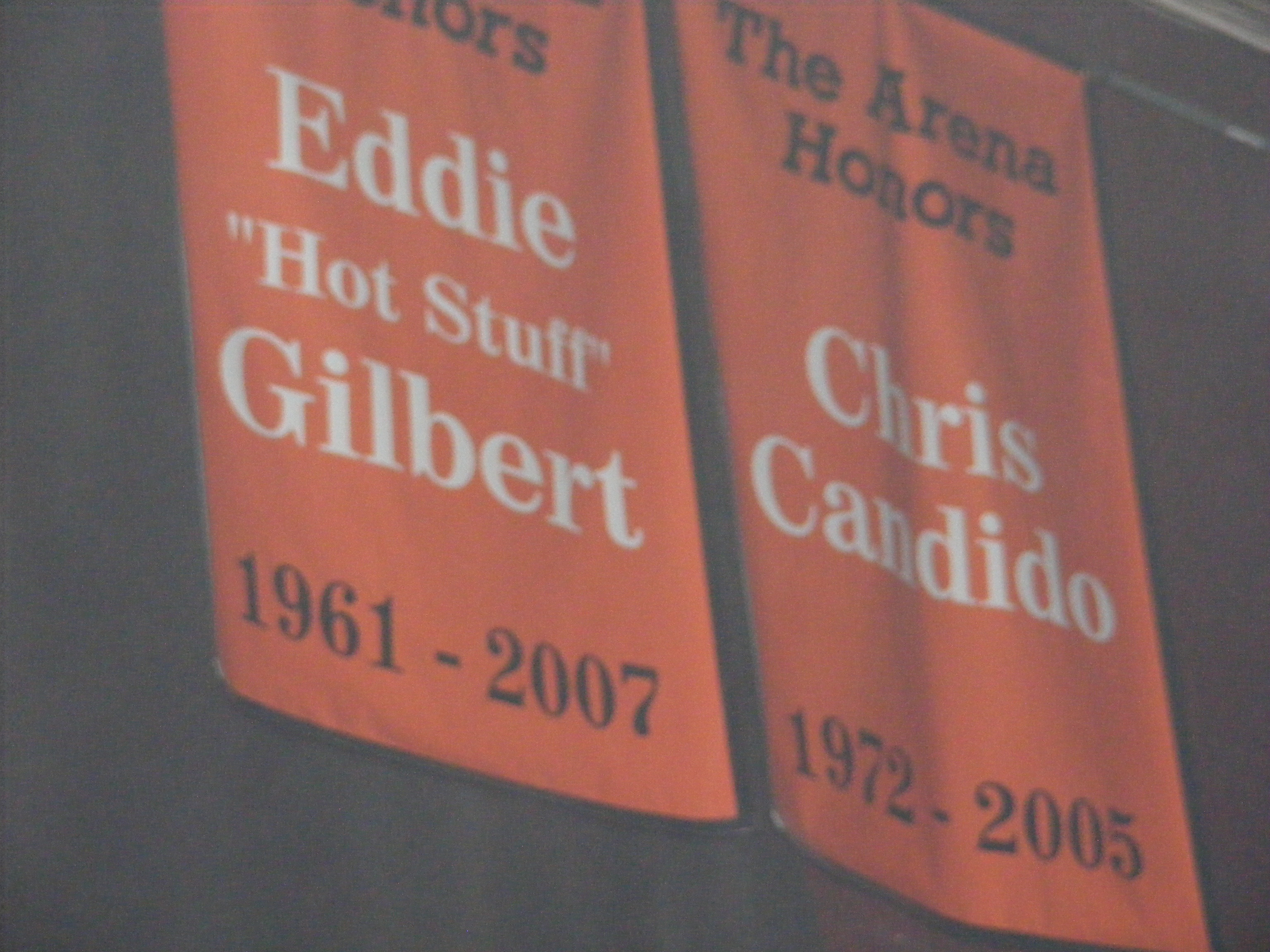
Candido's Hardcore Hall of Fame banner in the former ECW Arena

At Lockdown on April 24, 2005, Candido fractured both his tibia and fibula and dislocated his ankle during a steel cage match with Lance Hoyt against Apolo and Sonny Siaki. He underwent surgery the next day to have titanium plates and screws inserted into his leg. He was at the following Impact! tapings managing The Naturals to defeat America's Most Wanted to win the NWA World Tag Team Championship.

On April 28, 2005, Candido felt ill and his condition worsened during the day. He collapsed in the evening and was rushed to the Robert Wood Johnson University Hospital in New Brunswick, New Jersey. He was diagnosed with pneumonia. Doctors drained his lungs, but Candido died soon afterwards. He was 33 years old. His brother Johnny initially believed that Candido died due to a blood clot, a complication from surgery. In a 2016 interview, Johnny would reveal that Chris' autopsy confirmed that he did not die from a blood clot, but rather acute pneumonia brought on by his surgery. This death had a profound effect on fellow wrestlers such as CM Punk, who in 2014 voiced his concern over the possibility of a post-elbow surgery clot similar to what had erroneously been believed to have killed Candido.

TNA subsequently held the Chris Candido Memorial Tag Team Tournament in his honor in late 2005. In 2009, he was inducted into the Hardcore Hall of Fame.

== Other media ==
Both Candido and Sytch were featured on the Vice TV docuseries Dark Side of the Ring, aired on May 30, 2023.

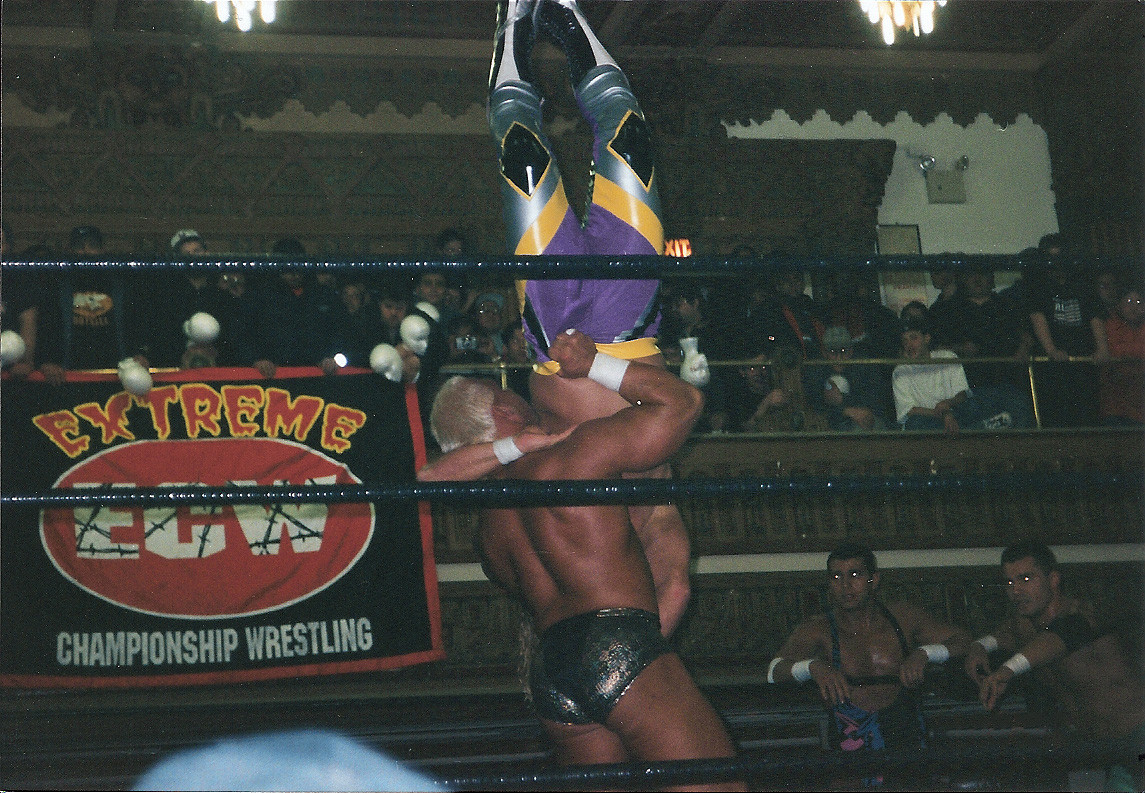
Candido performing a delayed vertical suplex on Jerry Lynn in 1998.

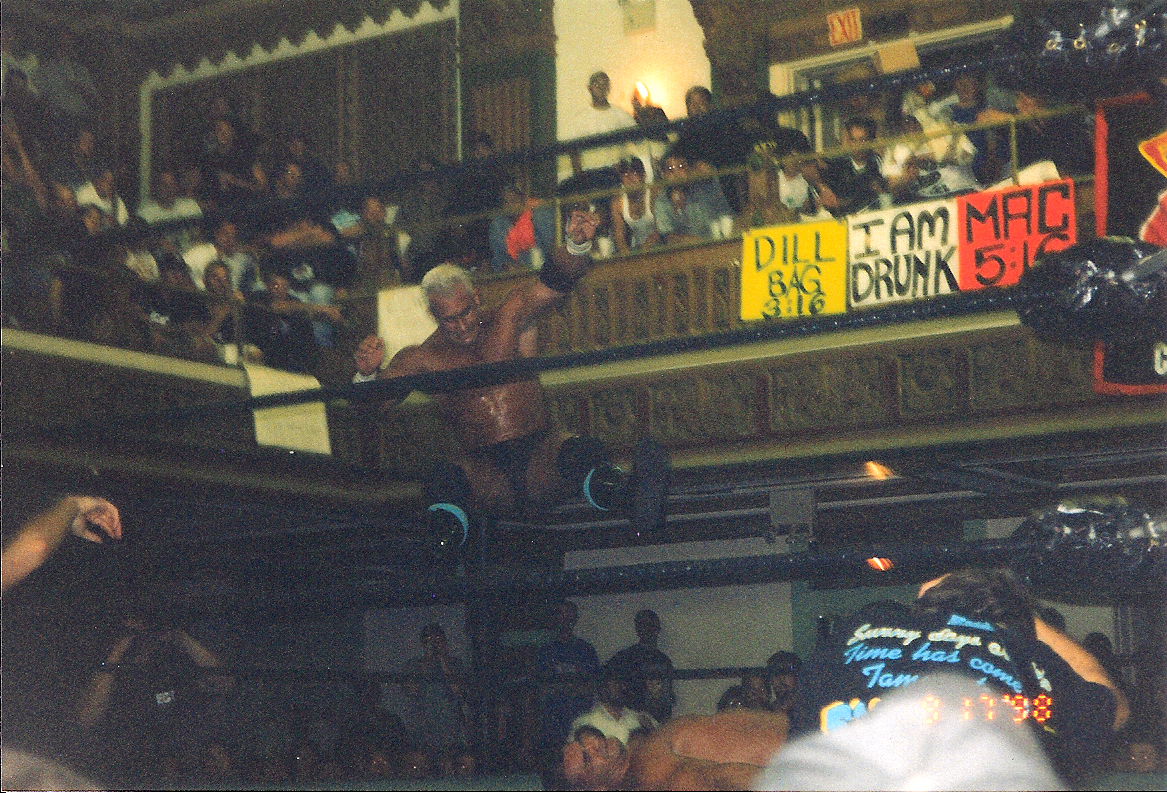
Candido performing the New Jersey Jam on Lance Storm.

== Championships and accomplishments ==
- California Creative Wrestling
  - CCW Heavyweight Championship (1 time)
- Eastern/Extreme Championship Wrestling
  - ECW (World) Tag Team Championship (3 times) – with Johnny Hotbody and Chris Michaels (2)^{1} and Lance Storm (1)
- Hardcore Hall of Fame
  - Class of 2009
- Independent Superstars of Professional Wrestling
  - ISPW Heavyweight Championship (1 time)
- Jersey Championship Wrestling
  - JCW Television Championship (1 time)
- Legacy Wrestling Enterprises
  - LWE World Heavyweight Championship (1 time)
- Mid-American Wrestling
  - MAW Heavyweight Championship (1 time)
- National Wrestling Alliance
  - NWA World Heavyweight Championship (1 time)
  - NWA World Championship Tournament (1994)
- NWA Midwest
  - NWA Midwest Heavyweight Championship (1 time)
- NWA New Jersey
  - NWA New Jersey Heavyweight Championship (1 time)
- Pennsylvania Championship Wrestling
  - PCW United States Heavyweight Championship (1 time)
- Pro Wrestling Illustrated
  - PWI Most Inspirational Wrestler of the Year (2005)
  - Ranked No. 45 out of the top 500 singles wrestlers of the PWI 500 in 1994 and 1998
  - Ranked No. 358 of the top 500 singles wrestlers in the "PWI Years" in 2003
- Smoky Mountain Wrestling
  - SMW Beat the Champ Television Championship (2 times)
  - SMW Tag Team Championship (2 times) – with Brian Lee
  - SMW United States Junior Heavyweight Championship (3 times)
- United States Extreme Wrestling
  - USEW United States Heavyweight Championship (3 times)
- USA Pro Wrestling
  - USA Pro United States Championship (1 time)
- World Championship Wrestling
  - WCW Cruiserweight Championship (1 time)
- World Wrestling Association
  - WWA Junior Heavyweight Championship (2 times)
  - WWA Tag Team Championship (1 time) – with Chris Evans
- World Wrestling Council
  - WWC World Television Championship (1 time)
- World Wrestling Federation
  - WWF Tag Team Championship (1 time) – with Zip
  - WWF Tag Team Championship Tournament (1996) - with Zip
- Xtreme Pro Wrestling
  - XPW World Heavyweight Championship (1 time)
- Wrestling Observer Newsletter awards
  - Most Underrated (1995)

^{1}Candido defended the championship with either Hotbody or Michaels under the Freebird Rule.

== See also ==
- The Bodydonnas
- Chris Candido Memorial Tag Team Tournament
- List of premature professional wrestling deaths
- The Triple Threat
