= Mo (wrestler) =

American professional wrestler (1967–2025)

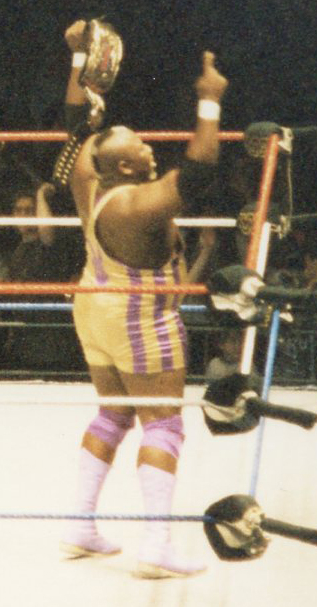
- Mo in 1994

Personal information
- Born: Robert Lawrence Horne; April 13, 1967 Monroe, North Carolina, U.S.
- Died: October 19, 2025 (aged 58) Dallas, Texas, U.S.

Professional wrestling career
- Ring name(s): B.J. Awesome; Bobby Knight; Marley Pryde; Buzz; Mo Doink; Mo; Sir Mo; Rob Harlem; Sir Mohammad
- Billed height: 6 ft 1 in (1.85 m)
- Billed weight: 285 lb (129 kg)
- Billed from: "Harlem, New York"
- Trained by: Ole Anderson; Gene Anderson; Ivan Koloff
- Debut: 1991
- Retired: 2020

Robert Lawrence Horne (April 13, 1967 – October 19, 2025) was an American professional wrestler. He was best known for his time in the World Wrestling Federation from 1993 to 1996 under the ring name Mo (later Sir Mo), where he held the WWF World Tag Team Championship with Mabel as "Men on a Mission".

== Professional wrestling career ==
=== Early career (1991–1993) ===
Horne made his debut in 1991 and soon found himself teaming with Nelson Frazier in the Carolinas-based Pro Wrestling Federation. The two were kayfabe half-brothers in a team known as "The Harlem Knights" with Horne performing as Bobby Knight and Frazier performing as Nelson Knight. The heel team was managed by George South, who led the young team to two PWF Tag-Team titles over the years. In April 1992, Horne worked two matches for WWF both on Superstars. One in a tag match with Jim Brunzell losing to the Beverly Brothers and losing to The Mountie.

In 1993, The Harlem Knights moved on to the United States Wrestling Association based out of Memphis without their manager George South. While in the USWA, the team was pushed as the "Monster threat" due to their size and feuded with Jerry Lawler, Jeff Jarrett, and other faces. Their work in the PWF and the USWA got them noticed by the World Wrestling Federation (WWF) and they were signed to a contract in the spring of 1993.

=== World Wrestling Federation (1993–1996) ===
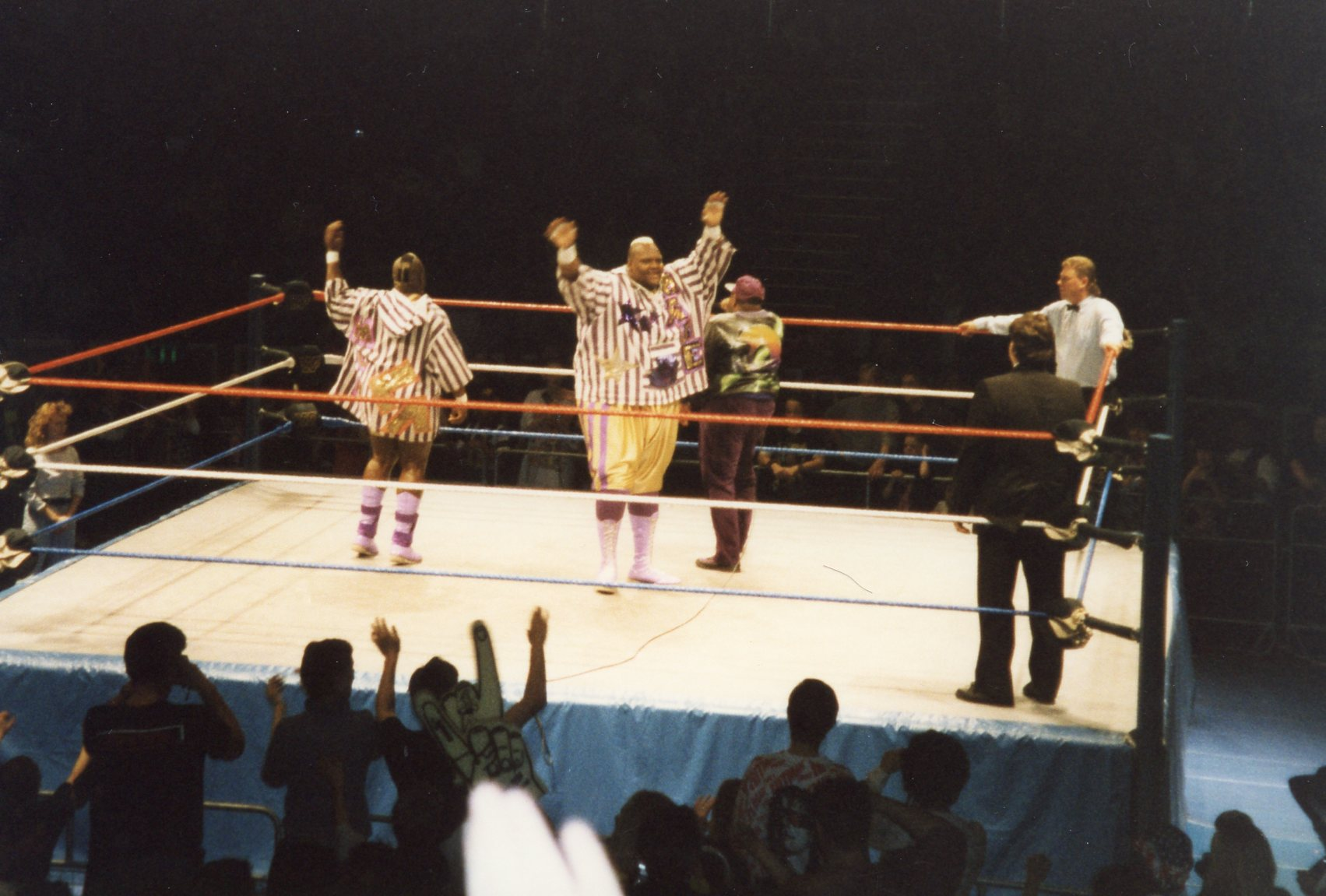
Mo (left) as one-half of Men on a Mission in the World Wrestling Federation in 1994.

When Horne and Frazier made their WWF debut, the vicious heel duo had been repackaged as faces with a rap gimmick. They wore bright clothes and had positive attitudes. They were teamed up with a rapping manager "Oscar" and had their names changed to Mo (Horne) and "Mabel" (Frazier) while the team name was changed to "Men on a Mission" (or M.O.M., the initials of the three men). The team met with moderate success in the ring but got over mainly due to Mabel’s unusual size, their fun loving personas, and Oscar’s crowd pleasing raps. Their fun loving personalities were prominently displayed when they appeared at Survivor Series 1993 dressed up as Doinks (referred to by color commentator Bobby Heenan as "Doinks on a Mission)" and teamed up with The Bushwhackers (also dressed as Doink) in a comedy match. At Royal Rumble, Mo competed in the 30-man Royal Rumble match where he was eliminated by Fatu.

Their next feud was against the WWF Tag Team Champions The Quebecers and they even won the titles during a United Kingdom tour. Two days later, however, the Quebecers regained the titles in a rematch. At WrestleMania X, Men on a Mission defeated The Quebecers by countout but didn't win the titles.

At Royal Rumble, Mo competed in 30-man Royal Rumble match where he was eliminated by King Kong Bundy. Mo injured his leg in a singles match against Owen Hart on the May 1 episode of Wrestling Challenge (taped April 12 in Syracuse, NY). Mo would not return to competition until October. That summer, Mabel started to wrestle more singles matches, leading to a King of the Ring win. It wasn't until the early part of 1995 that Men on a Mission started to team again on a regular basis.

In April 1995 after another loss, Mabel and Mo attacked the Smoking Gunns in a fit of anger, then apologized for it later on. When they asked the Gunns to come to the ring to let them apologize, Men on a Mission attacked them once again and then beat up Oscar, turning the duo heel and dropping their rapping manager.

After a short feud with the Smoking Gunns, Mabel won the 1995 King of the Ring tournament. He became King Mabel with his trusty sidekick being dubbed Sir Mo, wrestling royalty. When Mabel became king, the focus shifted from the team to Mabel once more with Sir Mo acting more as a manager and less like an active competitor as Mabel challenged for the WWF Championship. One of the last notable appearances for Men on a Mission was at In Your House 2 where they beat Razor Ramon and Savio Vega. They were also the opponents in the match where the British Bulldog turned on partner Diesel. Mo lost to The Undertaker on Monday Night Raw's November 27, 1995, episode during Mabel's feud with Taker. Mo's last WWF match was a loss to Marty Jannetty on January 12, 1996, in a house show at the Montreal Forum making it the last wrestling event at the Forum before it was demolished. Mabel and Mo's last appearance in the WWF together was at the 1996 Royal Rumble, where Mo accompanied Mabel (a Rumble participant) at ringside until he was eliminated by Yokozuna. Both Mabel and Mo left the WWF in early 1996.

=== Return to USWA; independent circuit (1996–2007) ===
After leaving the WWF, Mo and Mabel briefly returned to the USWA where they feuded with Brian Christopher, Jerry Lawler and The Moondogs. They disbanded in June 1996. After Men on a Mission, Mo became a part of the original Nation of Domination, the stable that was a forerunner to the more famous stable in the WWF. Mo became Sir Mohammad, using a black supremacist gimmick. The USWA version of the N.O.D. was led by PG-13 (J. C. Ice and Wolfie D) and also included Kareem Olajuwon (Reggie B. Fine), Akeem Muhamad (Big Black Dog), Elijah (The Spellbinder), Shaquille Ali (Tracy Smothers), Randy X (Randy Hales), and Queen Moishe (Jacqueline).

After the USWA version of Nation of Domination disbanded, Horne remained in the Memphis region. Under the name Rob Harlem, Horne competed in USWA, its successor Memphis Pro Wrestling, and Randy Hales' "Power Pro Wrestling". USWA shut down in November 1997. In 1997, Horne would start his own promotion "Southern Extreme Wrestling" which he both booked and wrestled for. He returned to WWF as Buzz on September 6, 1997, beating a jobber at a house show in Nashville, Tennessee.

While in PPW, Horne teamed up with "Deon Harlem" to form the tag team "The Regulators". The team beat Derrick King in a Handicap match to win the PPW Tag Team Title, which they held until the promotion closed down in April 2001. Horne subsequently took a hiatus from wrestling.

In 2003, Bobby Horne returned to wrestling under a new gimmick. On December 30, while Mabel was at ringside commentating, manager Paul Wylde appeared and introduced the "Bahamian Heavyweight Champion" Marly Pride. Wylde started making comments that Mabel was the fattest whale, which Mabel took exception to. When the big man entered the ring, Marley Pride was revealed as his former tag-team partner Mo who attacked him and the two brawled until they were separated by officials. Mo and Mabel had a short feud in Memphis Wrestling. On March 1, 2006, Horne (as Mo) defeated Bad News at a dark match for Ohio Valley Wrestling. On April 21, 2007, Mo defeated Christian York at ISPW in Newton, New Jersey. He then retired from wrestling and went into truck driving.

Horne worked as a promoter for New Blood Wrestling in Dyersburg, Tennessee, from 2006 to 2009.

=== Late career (2014–2025) ===
In 2014, Horne came out of retirement and defeated Mike King at HLW Heroes and Legends III in Fort Wayne, Indiana.

In May 2015, he worked four shows as Sir Mo teaming with Davey Boy Smith Jr. for Ultimate Championship Wrestling in Nova Scotia, Canada. He returned to the Maritimes in July with partner Lord Deon (Dean Johnson) for three more shows. On July 30, the team – known as MOM2K – won the UCW tag team titles by beating Sidewalk Sam and Homeless Bob in Halifax, Nova Scotia.

From January 2016, Horne ran SOAR Championship Wrestling with his wife Denise Jones in Dallas, Texas.

Wrestled his last match on March 7, 2020, in a triple threat against Jimmy McDowell and Johnny Walker which McDowell won for Coastal Championship Wrestling in Coral Springs, Florida.

== Personal life and death ==
In 2018, Horne received a kidney transplant.

In January 2022, Horne's health deteriorated and doctors determined he needed a liver transplant. Doctors became concerned about his body rejecting a new liver. He was hospitalized in the ICU with COVID-19. On February 4 of that year he was released from the hospital and stated in a Facebook post that he was in a medical rehab facility, using an oxygen tank, and taking antibiotics, but his kidneys had improved and he no longer required dialysis.

On October 19, 2025, at the age of 58, Horne died in a Texas intensive care unit after two months with a severe blood infection and pneumonia.

== Championships and accomplishments ==
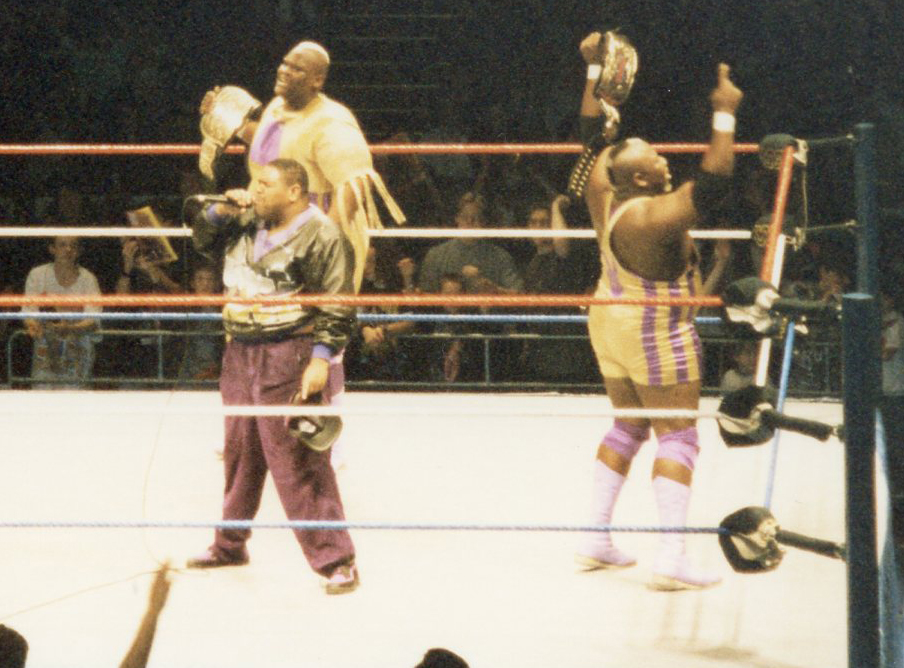
Mo (right) and Mabel (center) celebrating with Oscar (left) upon winning the WWF World Tag Team Championship in 1994.

- Golden Corner Wrestling
  - GCW Tag Team Championship (1 time) – with Lord Deon
- New England Pro Wrestling Hall of Fame
  - Class of 2013
- Memphis Wrestling Hall of Fame
  - Class of 2024
- Power Pro Wrestling
  - PPW Tag Team Championship (1 time) – with Deon Harlem
- Pro Wrestling Illustrated
  - Ranked #144 of the top 500 singles wrestlers in the PWI 500 in 1995
  - Ranked #468 of the 500 best singles wrestlers of the PWI Years in 2003
- Pro Wrestling Federation
  - PWF Tag Team Championship (4 times) – with Nelson Knight/Mabel (2) and Black Angel (2)
- SOAR Championship Wrestling
  - SOAR Tag Team Championship (1 time) – with Nate Lawson
- Southeastern Championship Wrestling
  - SCW United States Heavyweight Championship (1 time)
- Ultimate Championship Wrestling
  - UCW Tag Team Championship (1 time) – with MOM2K
- World Wrestling Federation
  - WWF World Tag Team Championship (1 time) – with Mabel
- Wrestling Observer Newsletter
  - Worst Worked Match of the Year (1993) with Mabel and The Bushwhackers vs. The Headshrinkers, Bastion Booger, and Bam Bam Bigelow at Survivor Series
