= Battlebowl =

1993 World Championship Wrestling pay-per-view event

- Promotional poster
- Promotion: World Championship Wrestling
- Date: November 20, 1993
- City: Pensacola, Florida
- Venue: Pensacola Civic Center
- Attendance: 7,000
- Buy rate: 55,000
- Tagline: Ready! Set! Battlebowl!

Pay-per-view chronology
← Previous; Halloween Havoc	Next → Starrcade

BattleBowl was a one-time professional wrestling pay-per-view (PPV) event produced by World Championship Wrestling (WCW). The show took place on November 20, 1993, at the Pensacola Civic Center in Pensacola, Florida. The event featured only the "BattleBowl Tournament", where the first round consisted of eight tag team matches where the teams were drawn at random in a "Lethal Lottery". Members of the winning teams would advance to the BattleBowl battle royal main event. Big Van Vader, who was already the WCW World Heavyweight Champion at the time of the show, received a ring for winning the tournament.

WCW had previously used the Battlebowl concept at Starrcade 1991 and Starrcade 1992, opting to make it a stand-alone show in 1993 as they expanded the number of PPV shows they held that year. The BattleBowl concept would not be used again until the 1996 Slamboree show. WCW closed in 2001 and all rights to their television and PPV shows were bought by WWE, including BattleBowl.

== Production ==
=== Background ===
The Lethal Lottery/BattleBowl concept was originally introduced for professional wrestling promotion World Championship Wrestling's (WCW) 1991 Starrcade pay-per-view (PPV) show held on December 29, 1991. The concept of the "Lethal Lottery" would see names drawn at random to form tag teams, although as with all professional wrestling this was all staged to appear random. The teams, sometimes consisting of two people who were involved in a storyline feud with each other, would compete against other random teams to see which team would move on to the BattleBowl portion of the tournament. The "BattleBowl" itself was an over-the-top-rope elimination battle royal between all the winning tag teams. In 1991 WCW used the BattleBowl to further a storyline between then WCW World Heavyweight Champion Lex Luger and Sting. WCW held another "Lethal Lottery"/"BattleBowl" tournament at their 1992 Starrcade show. That event was won by The Great Muta, but the tournament win did not result in further storylines.

WCW held a total of six PPVs in the continental United States in 1992, but in 1993 they expanded their schedule to seven, adding BattleBowl to their schedule for November, holding the tournament separately from the 1993 Starrcade show.

=== Storylines ===
The event featured wrestlers from pre-existing scripted feuds and storylines. Wrestlers portrayed villains, heroes, or less distinguishable characters in the scripted events that built tension and culminated in a wrestling match or series of matches.

== Event ==
Other on-screen personnel
Role:	Name:
Commentators	Tony Schiavone
Commentators	Jesse Ventura
Interviewer	Gene Okerlund
Ring announcers	Michael Buffer
Ring announcers	Gary Michael Cappetta
Referees	Randy Anderson
Referees	Nick Patrick

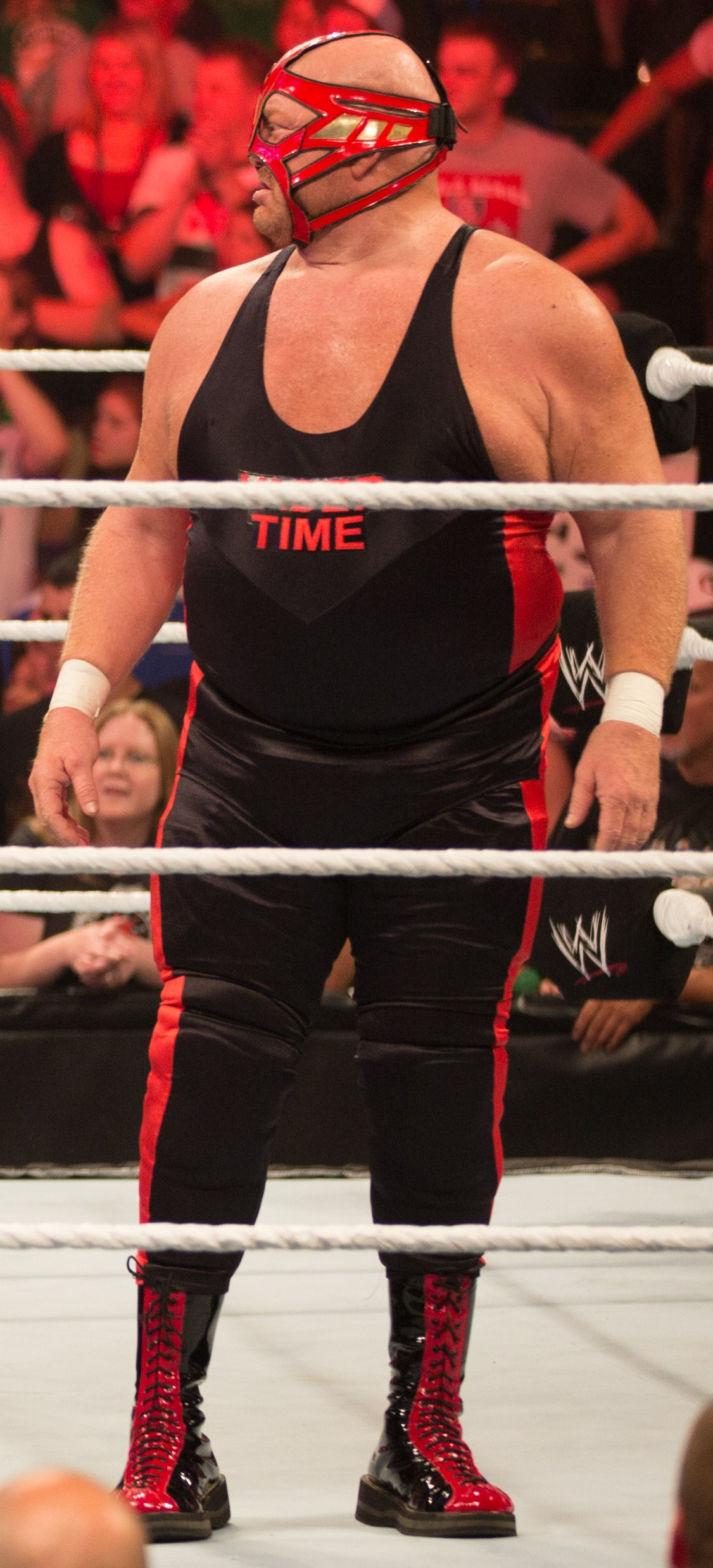
Big Van Vader, the reigning WCW World Heavyweight Champion and BattleBowl winner.

Tony Schiavone provided the play-by-play commentary for the show, while Jesse Ventura provided the color commentary, providing a counter-point by often siding with the heel wrestlers (those that portray the bad guys). Prior to each match Gene Okerlund and Fifi stood by a large lottery drum, supposedly pulling names at random, though the names were never displayed to the viewers. As the names were announced WCW showed two side-by-side live feeds, one from the heel locker room and one from the face (those that portray the good guys) locker room.

The first team announced consisted of Big Van Vader, WCW World Heavyweight Champion and Cactus Jack. Vader and Cactus Jack had been on opposite sides in the main event of WCW's last PPV Halloween Havoc, thus pairing rivals together for the first match. Okerlund announced that Harlem Heat member Kole was part of the opposite team, but instead of Kole leaving the locker room his brother Kane left the locker room and came to the ring. Kane helped Vader attack Cactus Jack, during which Schiavone commented that it was the wrong brother and then stated, "I guess it doesn't really matter". Moments later the last participant, Charlie Norris, came to the ring and the match started. Initially, Vader and Cactus Jack would occasionally hit each other during the match but later started to get along enough to double team their opponents. In the end, Vader pinned Charlie Norris to advance to the BattleBowl main event.

For the second match one-half of the WCW World Tag Team Championship team the Nasty Boys, Brian Knobbs was paired up with Johnny B. Badd for a match against Erik Watts and Paul Roma, who were both faces leading up to the match. After almost 13 minutes of wrestling Brian Knobbs pinned Eric Watts by holding onto Watts' tights for extra leverage to win the match. For the third match of the night long-time rivals Ricky Steamboat and Lord Steven Regal were forced to team together, much to the dismay of Regal who was very vocal in his displeasure with Steamboat. While their opponents, Paul Orndorff and The Shockmaster, were not on friendly terms they worked better together than Regal and Steamboat, allowing the Shockmaster to pin Regal.

After the third match WCW showed a segment advertising Starrcade in Charlotte, North Carolina. During the segment Ric Flair approached WCW World Heavyweight Champion Big Van Vader with a contract. First Vader refused to sign it, but when Flair revealed he would risk his career and retire if he lost the match, Vader agreed to the match, signing the contract for the main event of Starrcade. For the next match Dustin Rhodes was teamed up with King Kong to take on King Kong's regular partner Awesome Kong and The Equalizer, leaving Rhodes as the lone face against three heels. During the match all three heels attacked Dustin throughout the match, leaving Rhodes at a disadvantage throughout. In the end Awesome Kong accidentally landed on both King Kong and the Equalizer, leaving him vulnerable to Dustin Rhodes' Running bulldog move, which led to Rhodes pinning Awesome Kong. For the fifth match of the night rivals Sting and Jerry Sags were teamed up to take on Ron Simmons and Keith Cole. During the match Simmons started to get a little rougher in the ring, beating Sting down repeatedly. When he tagged in his partner Cole would wrestle a more basic match, opting for arm locks and holds, frustrating Simmons throughout the match. Near the end of the match, Sags tagged Sting on the back, taking over the match to pin Keith Cole. After the match Ron Simmons completed his heel turn by attacking Keith Cole.

To start the sixth match of the night, Steve Austin got in the face of his tag team partner Ric Flair, telling Flair that Austin was in charge of the match and Flair needed to follow his lead. As a result, Flair simply stepped to the apron and watched as Austin faced off against Maxx Payne (and partner 2 Cold Scorpio). When Payne was able to overpower Austin he tried to tag out to Flair but Flair walked down the apron, out of range. Flair did tag in later on and generally got along with Austin on the way to defeating Payne and Scorpio to earn their way to the main event. In the next match regular tag team partners Shanghai Pierce and Tex Slazenger found themselves on opposite sides of the ring, initially refusing to fight. The refusal angered Pierce's partner Rick Rude who tagged himself in while Slazenger tagged in Marcus Bagwell. Near the end of the match Slazenger and Pierce finally fought each other, leaving Slazinger open to Rick Rude sneaking in the ring to get a pinfall for his team. Afterward Pierce and Slazenger showed their unity by attacking Marcus Bagwell.

Road Warrior Hawk was the first competitor drawn for the last match and moments later his partner was announced as low card wrestler Rip Rogers. While Rogers was excited to be called for the match Hawk showed his displeasure by punching Rogers in the face during their introduction. Moments later both opponents, Davey Boy Smith and Kole, both hit Rip Rogers while he was on the ground. Hawk proceeded to wrestle the match on his own as Rogers slowly crawled towards the ring. After a short time in the ring with Hawk, Davey Boy Smith tagged out and left Kole to fight the remainder of the match. Near the end of the match, Rip Rogers finally got to ringside, only for Hawk to pull him into the ring, press him up over his head and throw him on top of Kole, enabling Rogers to win the match without performing a single move.

After the "fluke" win by Rogers, he was quickly eliminated from the BattleBowl as he was tossed out of the ring moments after the bell rang. Austin ended up eliminating Dustin Rhodes, who hit his head on the ring post, and then "bladed" to cause his forehead to bleed for dramatic effect. The final four wrestlers were Sting, Steve Austin, Ric Flair and Big Van Vader, with Sting and Vader facing off and Flair and Austin pairing up. During the match, Vader's manager Harley Race pulled Ric Flair out of the ring onto the ramp. Race tried to suplex Flair, but Flair countered it and suplexed Race instead. While Flair was still on the ramp Vader left the ring and attacked Flair dropping his considerable weight on him twice. Moments later it was announced that the referee had deemed Flair physically unable to compete and thus was eliminated from the match. Later on, Austin was eliminated when Sting carried him over the top rope and he fell off the ramp. Sting was then eliminated when he missed a Stinger Splash and fell over the top rope, giving Vader the victory.

== Aftermath ==
With a victory over Vader at Clash of the Champions XXV, and their interaction in the main event, Ric Flair challenged Vader to defend the WCW World Heavyweight Championship. Flair defeated Vader in the main event of the 1993 Starrcade show to win the championship.

After Regal attacked Steamboat during their match, Steamboat challenged Lord Steven Regal for the WCW World Television Championship at Starrcade, with the match ending in a 15-minute time limit draw. Due to the draw Regal retained the championship.

== BattleBowl concept ==
WCW abandoned the BattleBowl concept for a number of years, bringing it back one last time for the 1996 Slamboree event. Diamond Dallas Page won the 1996 BattleBowl, using the win as a way to increase Page's profile in the company, starting an ascent that would eventually lead to Page winning the WCW World Heavyweight Championship. In 2001 WWE bought out WCW, gaining ownership of all television and PPV programming produced by WCW, including the BattleBowl show. When the WWE Network launched in 2014 this show became available "on demand" to network subscribers along with the majority of all WCW PPVs.

Other promotions have used a similar concept to the "Lethal Lottery" / "BattleBowl" tournament after WCW created the concept in 1991. Chikara held La Lotería Letal in 2008 which adopted the "Lethal Lottery" portion of the tournament by drawing random names for a tag team tournament. In early 2013 Total Nonstop Action Wrestling adopted the "Lethal Lottery"/"BattleBowl" concept with their first ever Joker's Wild tournament, held as part of their "One Night Only" PPV series. The "Joker's Wild" tournament included both the Lethal Lottery portion and the BattleBowl portion, with the winners being given a cash prize as a reward for winning the tournament.

== Results ==
No.	Results	Stipulations	Times
1	Big Van Vader and Cactus Jack (with Harley Race) defeated Charlie Norris and Stevie Ray	Tag team match	07:34
2	Brian Knobbs and Johnny B. Badd (with Missy Hyatt) defeated Erik Watts and Paul Roma	Tag team match	12:56
3	The Shockmaster and Paul Orndorff defeated Ricky Steamboat and Lord Steven Regal (with Sir William)	Tag team match	12:26
4	King Kong and Dustin Rhodes defeated The Equalizer and Awesome Kong	Tag team match	05:55
5	Sting and Jerry Sags (with Missy Hyatt) defeated Ron Simmons and Keith Cole	Tag team match	13:14
6	Ric Flair and Steve Austin (with Col. Robert Parker and Fifi) defeated 2 Cold Scorpio and Maxx Payne	Tag team match	14:31
7	Rick Rude and Shanghai Pierce defeated Tex Slazenger and Marcus Bagwell	Tag team match	14:50
8	Road Warrior Hawk and Rip Rogers defeated Davey Boy Smith and Kole	Tag team match	07:55
9	Big Van Vader won the 16-man battle royal by lastly eliminating Sting	BattleBowl battle royal	25:33

== See also ==
- TNA One Night Only Joker's Wild tournament
- TNA One Night Only Joker's Wild 2 tournament
- TNA One Night Only Joker's Wild 3 tournament
- TNA One Night Only Joker's Wild 4 tournament
