= Men on a Mission =

Professional wrestling tag team

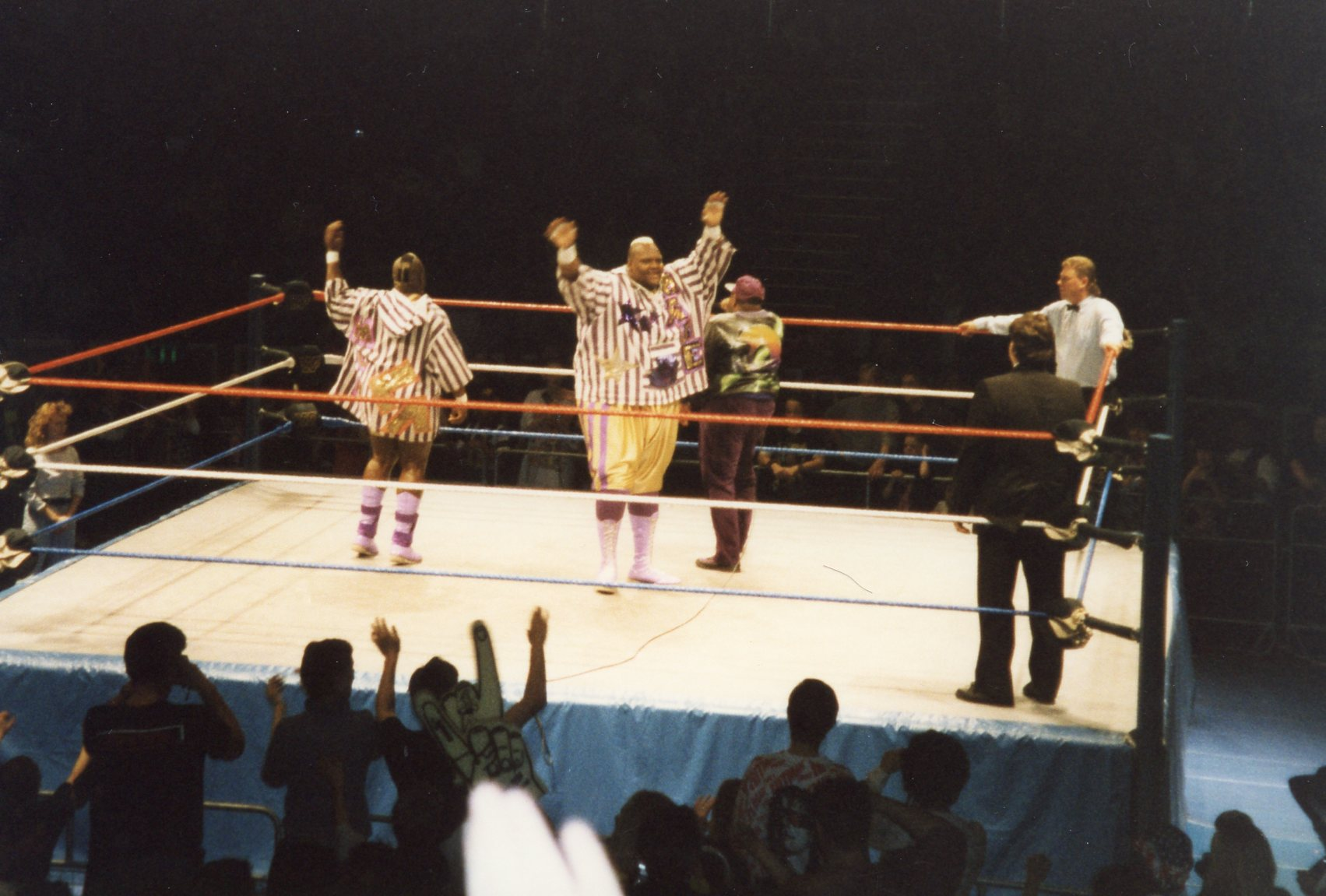
- (Left to right) Mo, Mabel and Oscar (manager) as Men on a Mission

Tag team
- Members: Mabel; Mo; Oscar
- Name(s): Men on a Mission; The Harlem Knights
- Billed heights: 6 ft 9 in (2.06 m) – Mabel; 6 ft 1 in (1.85 m) – Mo
- Combined billed weight: 853Ibs (386kg)
- Billed from: Harlem, New York City
- Debut: March 1993
- Disbanded: June 1996
- Years active: 1993–1996

Men on a Mission was a professional wrestling tag team composed of Mabel (Nelson Frazier) and Mo (Robert Horne), best known for its appearances in the World Wrestling Federation (WWF) from 1993 to 1996.

== Career ==
=== Harlem Knights (1993) ===
The team that would later be known as “Men on a Mission” started out by competing as a team in the Pro Wrestling Federation and the United States Wrestling Association where they wrestled as The Harlem Knights with Frazier being known as Nelson Knight and Horne as Bobby Knight, with the two being billed as half-brothers. In the PWF the team was managed by George South. The duo would return to the PWF in 1996 and won the PWF Tag Team Title.

While in the USWA the team feuded with Jerry Lawler, Jeff Jarrett and other faces being pushed as the “Monster threat” due to their size. Their work in the PWF and the USWA got them noticed by the WWF and they were signed to a contract in 1993.

=== Men on a Mission (1993-1995) ===
When Men on a Mission began appearing on WWF television on June 14, 1993, their vicious heel gimmick had been repackaged as faces. They wore bright clothes, had positive attitudes, and teamed with a rapping manager called “Oscar” (Greg Girard) and they were now known as “Mabel”, “Oscar”, and “Mo”, collectively “M.O.M.” or “Men On a Mission”. They had the image of three people who could be loved by the crowd, but who were also attempting to make positive changes in their neighborhood. This was accomplished through use of several vignettes showing them walking down streets in the ghetto, but saying positive things and talking about how things could be made better.

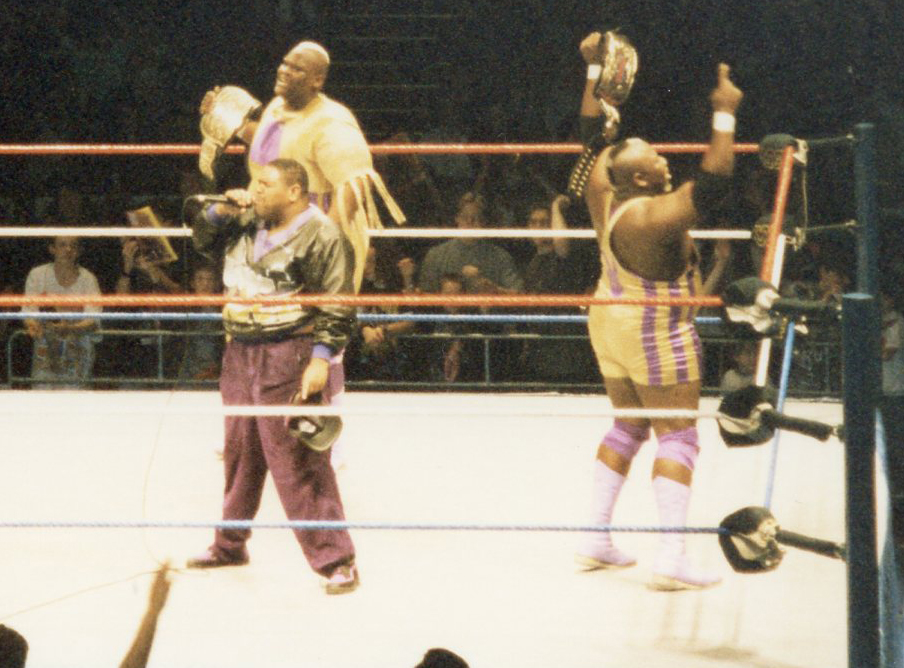
Men on a Mission celebrating winning the WWF Tag Team Championship.

The team met with moderate success and got over with the crowd because of Mabel's unusual size, their in-ring personas, and Oscar's crowd pleasing raps. Their fun loving personalities were prominently displayed at the 1993 Survivor Series, when they, along with The Bushwhackers, dressed up as Doink the Clown and wrestled as "The Four Doinks" in a comedy match against Bam Bam Bigelow, Bastion Booger, and The Headshrinkers. The team even won the match in comedic fashion, with all four team members garnering the pin on Bigelow. Their next feud was against the WWF Tag Team Champions The Quebecers. Men on a Mission won the titles on March 29, 1994 at a house show in London, England. Two days later, the Quebecers regained the titles in Sheffield, England. The title change was also reported on WWF television.

Men on a Mission were temporarily sidelined when Mo injured his leg in a singles match against Owen Hart on the May 1 episode of Wrestling Challenge (taped April 12 in Syracuse, NY). Mo would not return to competition until October; meanwhile Mabel, who was seen as the big star of the group, began wrestling more singles matches in an attempt to get over as a solo wrestler. He was also used to help get rising stars over, due to his size.

Men on a Mission returned to regular teaming in late 1994, and moved almost immediately back into the Tag Team Championship picture. The team was entered in an eight-team tournament for the WWF Tag Team Championship, which was vacant at the time due to champions Shawn Michaels and Diesel breaking up. The team was eliminated in the first round on December 17, 1994 by Tatanka and Bam Bam Bigelow (who went on to lose in the tournament final to Bob "Spark Plugg" Holly and The 1–2–3 Kid who would lose belts to The Smoking Gunns the next day). Around February 1995, fans were getting tired of their rapping to the ring and slowly began booing the team and the decision was made to turn the team heel, the first sign of the heel turn was when the team dyed their mohawks jet black and challenged the Smoking Gunns for the championship but lost the match and they attacked the Smoking Gunns.

The next week on Action Zone Oscar offered an apology to The Gunns, and on the show after that Mabel and Mo decided to bring out the Gunns to shake their hands. After shaking their hands and raising the arms of the Gunns, Mabel and Mo then responded by clotheslining Billy and Bart Gunn to the mat. As Mabel repeatedly splashed Bart while Mo assaulted Billy, Oscar tried to intervene and pleaded with his charges to stop. Mo shoved Oscar to the mat and held him there while Mabel nailed him with a running leg drop, completing the heel turn as Mabel and Mo mocked the Gunns by parading around the ring wearing their cowboy hats and antagonized the fans.

Originally, Oscar was to remain as the team's manager, but he objected to the idea of the heel turn and decided to leave the company. In an interview for Pro Wrestling Insider, Oscar explained that the reason why he signed on to be part of Men on a Mission was that he was a positive person and believed in the nature of the characters, and turning them heel was something he did not want to be part of. He retired from wrestling after the turn.

=== King Mabel and Sir Mo (1995-1996) ===
After a short feud with the Smoking Gunns, Mabel returned to singles competition and was immediately given the spot as the top villain in the company. He won the 1995 King of the Ring and began referring to himself as King Mabel, with Mo becoming Sir Mo and taking on more of a managerial role. Mabel was put into a feud with Diesel, the reigning WWF Champion, with the two scheduled to wrestle at Summerslam. However, the WWF's plans changed on the August 14, 1995 broadcast of Monday Night Raw. That night, Men on a Mission were to face the Allied Powers in the main event. However, Lex Luger did not show and The British Bulldog asked Diesel to team with him. Bulldog then turned heel by attacking Diesel and assisting Men on a Mission in beating him down. The entire situation was referred to on air as the "Royal Plan" and was to involve Jim Cornette, who took the Bulldog as a client following the match. However, the feud between Mabel and Diesel was cut off following SummerSlam after Mabel injured Diesel by performing a seated senton onto his lower back.

With the Bulldog now taking over Mabel's top villain spot, Mabel was placed in a feud with The Undertaker. The feud ended just as quickly and once again, it was due to Mabel injuring his opponent as he broke several bones in Undertaker's face with a leg drop. In January 1996 they left the WWF after Royal Rumble 1996.

=== Post WWF, return to WWF, and deaths ===
Shortly after leaving the WWF, Frazier and Horne (still wrestling as Mabel and Mo) moved to the United States Wrestling Association. They feuded with The Moondogs and Doug Gilbert and Brian Christopher. Then they were both entered in a tournament for the Unified Heavyweight Championship. Mabel defeated Mo on March 4, 1996 and went on to lose in the tournament final to Jerry Lawler. The team broke up in June 1996. They met each other once again on January 4, 1997 when Mabel won a Lumberjack match in USWA.

Frazier eventually returned to the WWF as Mabel in 1998 doing a run in on 1998 King of The Ring Ken Shamrock and getting beaten by Shamrock later that night. Frazier made an appearance in ECW as a part of The Full Blooded Italians after a match between Tracy Smothers and Tommy Rogers until Spike Dudley took him down with an acid drop. Frazier made his return at the 1999 Royal Rumble, taking on Mankind and later that night jumped one of The Headbangers to enter the Royal Rumble match. The Undertaker and his Ministry of Darkness pulled him out of the match and threw him in the back of a hearse. This led to him being repackaged as Viscera, a member of the Ministry of Darkness. Frazier was released from his WWF contract in August 2000. In March 2003, Frazier, as "Nelson Knight", made a surprise appearance at a weekly NWA: Total Nonstop Action pay-per-view at the side of Ron Killings. A second appearance followed the next week, but Frazier soon returned to the independent circuit. On September 21, 2004, Frazier returned again to the WWE as Viscera. In 2007, he was repackaged as "Big Daddy V" and began appearing on the ECW brand. Frazier was released from his WWE contract on August 8, 2008. After wrestling for promotions such as the National Wrestling Alliance and the Insane Clown Posse's Juggalo Championship Wrestling, Frazier began wrestling for All Japan Pro Wrestling, as Big Daddy Voodoo, where he was a former All Asia Tag Team Champion with TARU and was part of the Voodoo Murders stable.

Horne stayed in the independent promotions and wrestled as both Mo and Rob Harlem. He and Frazier both resurfaced in Memphis Wrestling for a show in 2003, during which Horne (as Mo) turned on Frazier (as Mabel), which led to a one-off match which Frazier won. Horne retired from wrestling in 2007, and Frazier died of a heart attack on February 18, 2014. Later that year, Horne returned to wrestling and continued to wrestle in the independent promotions in the US and Canada, while also running the SOAR Championship Wrestling promotion with his wife Denise Jones in Dallas, Texas. On October 19, 2025, Horne died of complications from a blood infection and pneumonia. Also had health issues for years.

Oscar is still alive as of 2026.

== Championships and accomplishments ==
- New England Pro Wrestling Hall of Fame
  - Class of 2013 – Mabel, Mo and Oscar
- Pro Wrestling Federation
  - PWF Tag Team Championship (2 times)
- World Wrestling Federation
  - WWF Tag Team Championship (1 time)
  - King of the Ring (1995) (Mabel)
  - Slammy Award (1 time)
    - Best Entertainer (1994) (Oscar)
- Wrestling Observer Newsletter awards
  - Worst Worked Match of the Year (1993) with The Bushwhackers vs. The Headshrinkers, Bastion Booger, and Bam Bam Bigelow at Survivor Series
