= Keith Cole =

Keith Cole may refer to:

- Keith Cole, wrestler associated with the Cole Twins
- Keith Cole (artist), Canadian performance artist
