= Viscera (wrestler) =

American professional wrestler (1971–2014)

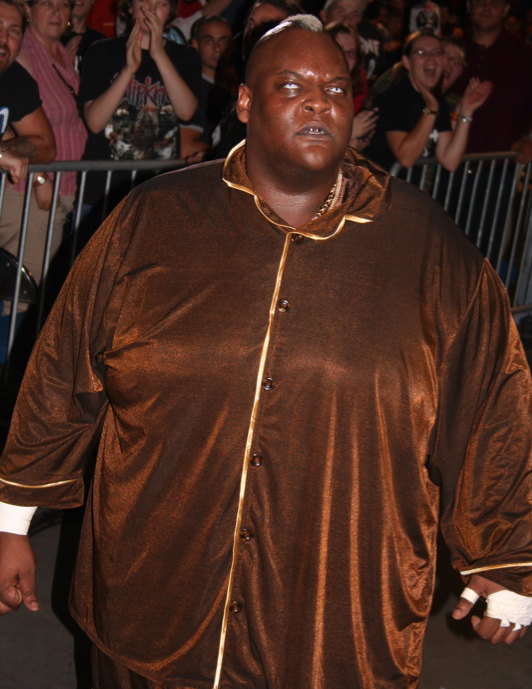
- Viscera in 2005

Personal information
- Born: Nelson Lee Frazier Jr. February 14, 1971 Goldsboro, North Carolina, U.S.
- Died: February 18, 2014 (aged 43) Memphis, Tennessee, U.S.
- Cause of death: Heart attack
- Spouse: Cassandra Frazier

Professional wrestling career
- Ring name(s): Big Daddy; Big Daddy V Big Daddy Voodoo; Mabel Doink; King Mabel; Mabel; Nelson Knight; Viscera
- Billed height: 6 ft 9 in (206 cm)
- Billed weight: 487 lb (221 kg)
- Billed from: Harlem, New York
- Trained by: Gene Anderson
- Debut: 1991

Nelson Lee Frazier Jr. (February 14, 1971 – February 18, 2014) was an American professional wrestler. He is best known for his time with the World Wrestling Federation/World Wrestling Entertainment (WWF/WWE) in the 1990s and 2000s under the ring names Mabel, Viscera, and Big Daddy V. A former WWF World Tag Team Champion and WWF Hardcore Champion, he won the 1995 King of the Ring tournament and subsequently challenged for the WWF Championship in the main event of that year's SummerSlam.

== Early life ==
Frazier grew up in Goldsboro, North Carolina, where he attended Eastern Wayne High School and took part in amateur wrestling in the ninth grade. He studied commercial art after finishing high school.

== Professional wrestling career ==
=== Early career (1991–1993) ===
Frazier began his professional wrestling career under the ring name "Nelson Knight", as one half of the "Harlem Knights" tag team with his partner and storyline brother Bobby (Robert Horne). They wrestled in the United States Wrestling Association (USWA) and the Pro Wrestling Federation (PWF), twice winning the PWF Tag Team Championship in 1992, before signing with the World Wrestling Federation (WWF) in 1993.

=== World Wrestling Federation (1993–1996) ===
==== Debut, Tag Team Champion (1993–1994) ====
Upon entering the WWF, The Harlem Knights were given a new gimmick: Nelson became Mabel, Bobby became Mo, and they were given a rapping manager named Oscar. The new team, dubbed Men on a Mission, donned colorful gear and were introduced to WWF audiences in June 1993, through vignettes portraying them as three African American men trying to make a positive change in inner city neighborhoods, establishing themselves as faces. Men on a Mission made their pay-per-view debut at Survivor Series on November 24, teaming with The Bushwhackers (Luke and Butch) to defeat Bam Bam Bigelow, Bastion Booger and The Headshrinkers (Fatu and Samu) in a 4-on-4 Survivor Series elimination match.

At WrestleMania X on March 20, 1994, Men on a Mission defeated WWF Tag Team Champions The Quebecers (Jacques and Pierre) by countout, but did not win the belts. On March 29, they defeated The Quebecers to win the titles at a house show in London, England, but lost them in a rematch two days later in Sheffield, England. In mid-1994, Mabel competed in the 1994 King of the Ring tournament, but lost to IRS in the quarterfinals on June 19. He also lost to Jeff Jarrett at SummerSlam on August 29.

==== King of the Ring, departure (1995–1996) ====
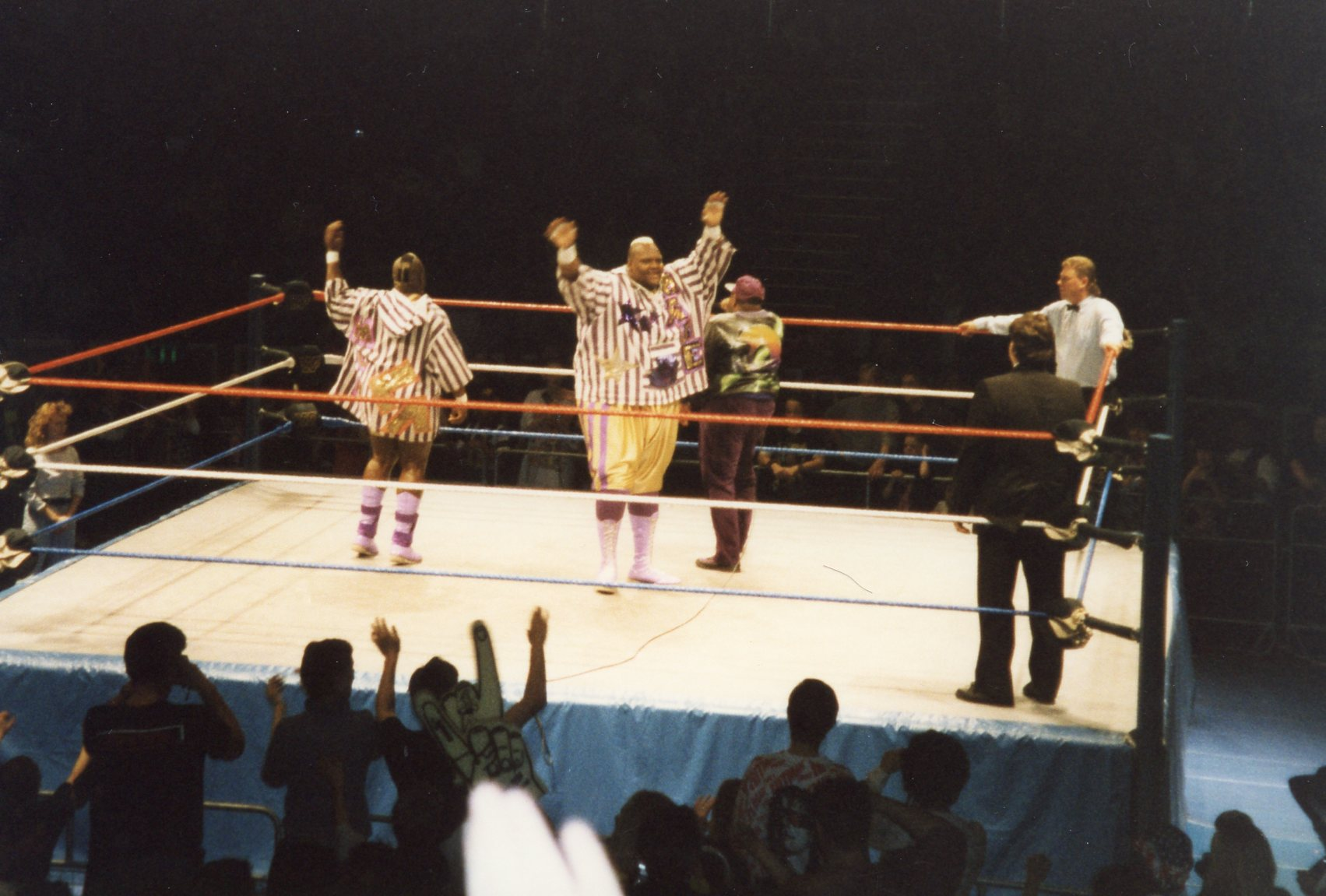
Frazier as Mabel (center) with Mo (left) and Oscar (right) as Men on a Mission

In March 1995, Men on a Mission lost a title match against the reigning tag team champions, Smoking Gunns (Billy Gunn and Bart Gunn). After the match, Mabel and Mo brutally assaulted them, but offered an apology and brought out Billy and Bart after a match weeks later for a handshake. It proved to be a ruse, however, as Mabel and Mo not only beat up Billy and Bart, but also turned on Oscar, becoming heels. Mabel received a push as a singles wrestler, defeating Savio Vega to win the King of the Ring tournament on June 25. After his victory, he became known as King Mabel, with Mo becoming his manager and rechristened as "Sir Mo". King Mabel was awarded a championship belt engraved with "King of the Ring", which was designed and created by belt maker Reggie Parks, but not used on WWF television. At In Your House 2 on July 23, he and Mo defeated Vega and Razor Ramon.

As the WWF's top heel, King Mabel challenged WWF Champion Diesel at SummerSlam. Just before SummerSlam, on an August edition of Monday Night Raw, the WWF turned Davey Boy Smith, one of the company's more popular wrestlers, against the fans, replacing King Mabel as the company's top villain. Men on a Mission were to wrestle Smith and Lex Luger, who were then known as The Allied Powers. Luger was not at the event, so Smith convinced Diesel to be his partner. Smith then attacked Diesel during the match and joined King Mabel and Sir Mo in assaulting him; the attack was called the "Royal Plan". At SummerSlam on August 27, King Mabel failed to win the WWF Championship from Diesel. According to Frazier, Vince McMahon planned for him to win the title, which fell through, due to backstage influence from The Kliq. On October 22, at In Your House 4, Mabel fought Yokozuna to a double countout.

During this time, Mabel was involved in a high-profile feud involving The Undertaker, after Mabel helped Yokozuna attack a downed Undertaker. Mabel was to hit a series of leg drops on the fallen Undertaker, and he repeatedly struck Undertaker in the face, resulting in Undertaker suffering a legitimate fracture of his orbital bone, which put him out of action for two months. The Undertaker returned wearing a Phantom of the Opera-style mask, teaming with Vega, Fatu and Henry O. Godwinn to defeat Mabel, Jerry Lawler, Isaac Yankem and Hunter Hearst Helmsley on November 19 at Survivor Series. At In Your House 5 on December 17, Mabel lost to The Undertaker in a casket match. After this match, Mabel's push came to an end, wrestling his last three matches in early 1996; he was buried in an eight-second loss to Diesel on the New Year's Day edition of Raw, lost another casket match to The Undertaker on the January 6 edition of WWF Superstars, and failed to win the Royal Rumble match on January 21.

=== Various promotions (1995–1998) ===
In late 1995, during his WWF tenure, Frazier began wrestling for the Puerto Rico-based World Wrestling Council (WWC). He feuded with Carlos Colón, with the WWC Universal Heavyweight Championship being held up after a match between the two. On January 7, 1996, he defeated Colón to win the championship, which he held for a month. He also returned to Tennessee to wrestle for the United States Wrestling Association until he left in March 1997 before the promotion shut its doors in November 1997. He captured the USWA Heavyweight Championship in March 1996 and the MCW North American Heavyweight Championship in February 1998, which were each the top title in the promotion at the time.

On December 1, 1996, he appeared at the Inoki Festival in Yoyogi event in Tokyo, Japan, losing to Koji Kitao. Mabel made a one-night-only surprise appearance at Extreme Championship Wrestling (ECW)'s November to Remember on November 1, 1998, as a Full Blooded Italians member with Ulf Herman, losing to Spike Dudley in a handicap match.

=== Return to WWF (1998–2000) ===
==== Ministry of Darkness and Corporate Ministry (1998–1999) ====
On the July 6, 1998 (taped June 30) episode of Raw is War, Mabel made a one-night-only surprise return to the WWF, losing to the new King of the Ring, Ken Shamrock.

On January 24, 1999, Frazier made his full-time return, first appearing at the Royal Rumble pre-show as Mabel, then on the show itself. He eliminated five competitors; Droz, Steve Blackman, Dan Severn, Tiger Ali Singh and The Blue Meanie. Later, he was eliminated (by way of kidnapping) by The Undertaker, his Acolytes (Bradshaw and Faarooq), and Mideon. He was subsequently reintroduced as the Ministry of Darkness' enforcer, Viscera, adopting a gothic look, including white-out contact lenses, a bleached mohawk and a black bodysuit. At Over the Edge on May 23, The Ministry of Darkness lost to The Union (Big Show, Ken Shamrock, Mankind and Test) in an eight-man elimination tag team match.

==== Hardcore Champion and departure (1999–2000) ====
After the Ministry of Darkness split in July 1999, Viscera frequently teamed with fellow former Ministry member Mideon. They competed in a tag team turmoil match at SummerSlam on August 22, but were unsuccessful. In early 2000, Viscera feuded with Mark Henry, after he splashed Henry's storyline girlfriend, Mae Young. At No Way Out on February 27, Viscera lost to Henry. He became part of the burgeoning hardcore division, winning the WWF Hardcore Championship on April 2 at WrestleMania 2000, and losing it minutes later in the same battle royal-style match. Viscera was taken off the WWF main roster in April and sent to the developmental territory, Memphis Championship Wrestling (MCW), before he was released from his WWF contract in August 2000.

=== Independent circuit (2000–2004) ===
Following his release from the WWF, Frazier wrestled sporadically on the independent circuit. He also appeared at a weekly Total Nonstop Action Wrestling (TNA) pay-per-view, at the side of Ron Killings, in March 2003. As King Mabel, he debuted for Memphis Wrestling in July 2003, where he feuded with Jerry Lawler. He also faced Rocky Johnson in a boxing match on November 29, but lost. In 2004, Mabel entered a feud with his former partner Sir Mo, defeating Mo in a submission match on January 17, after a previous match ended in a double countout. He won a battle royal in Memphis in February 2004. Also was the Memphis Wrestling Southern Heavyweight Championship in March of that year. In July 2004, he returned to Puerto Rico working for IWA Puerto Rico.

=== Second return to WWE (2004–2008) ===
==== World's Largest Love Machine (2004–2007) ====
Frazier, as Viscera, made his surprise return to the former WWF (by then renamed World Wrestling Entertainment) on the September 16, 2004 episode of SmackDown!, where he and Gangrel attacked former Ministry of Darkness leader, The Undertaker, at the command of former Ministry Acolyte and WWE Champion John "Bradshaw" Layfield (JBL). The following week on SmackDown!, they lost to The Undertaker in a handicap match. On November 1, Viscera was moved to the Raw brand, where he lost his first match back to Shelton Benjamin. In his first three months on the brand, Viscera mainly wrestled on Raw's sister show, Heat, only making sporadic appearances on Raw.

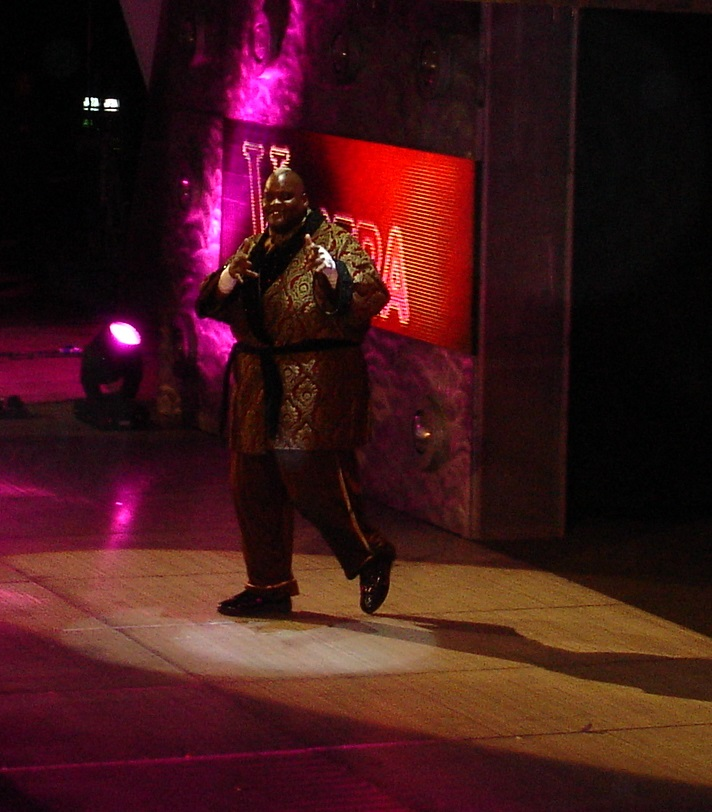
Viscera in August 2005

Viscera's first major storyline started in April 2005, when he aligned with Trish Stratus as part of her feud with Lita and Lita's husband, Kane. In one segment, Viscera attempted to seduce Stratus at a restaurant, only to be rebuffed by Stratus, who implied he should stop Kane first. After losing to Kane at Backlash on May 1, Viscera injured Stratus with his Big Splash finishing move, angry about her constant belittling of him, turning face for the first time since 1995. Viscera became smitten with Raw ring announcer Lilian Garcia and tried different tactics to seduce her every week. These segments gave Viscera the gimmick of "The World's Largest Love Machine", wrestling in pajamas and making overtly sexual gestures in the ring. At Vengeance on June 26, Garcia finally reciprocated, proposing to Viscera in the center of the ring, only to be turned down and left crying in the ring, when The Godfather arrived with many of his "Ho's" to show Viscera what he would be leaving behind if he got married.

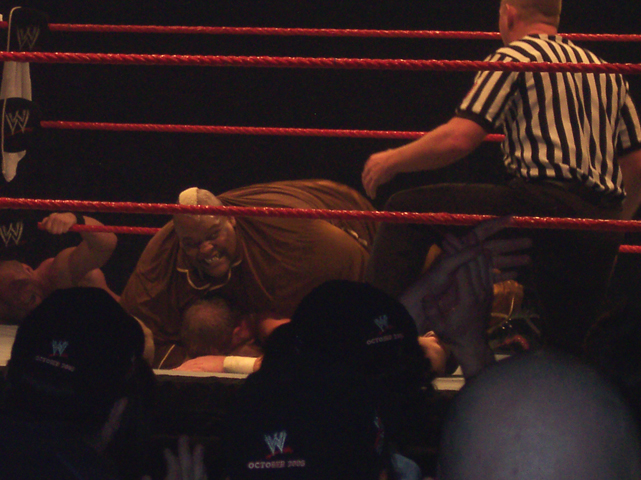
Viscera performing the Viscagra on Trevor Murdoch in October 2005

In August 2005, Viscera began teaming with Val Venis on Heat, forming V–Squared. At New Year's Revolution on January 8, 2006, after a segment with Benjamin's "Momma" (played by comedian/actress Thea Vidale), Benjamin challenged Viscera to a match later that night, which Viscera lost after being struck twice with his Momma's loaded purse. Later that month, Viscera entered the Royal Rumble on January 29, but was eliminated by Carlito and Chris Masters. The team of Viscera and Venis ended when the latter was sidelined with a legitimate injury in April.

On the May 22 episode of Raw, Viscera attempted to reconcile with Garcia, but was interrupted and attacked by Umaga during his proposal. Two weeks later, when Garcia was legitimately and accidentally knocked from the ring apron by Charlie Haas and sprained her wrist, the incident was worked into a storyline, where Haas and Viscera fought over Garcia. After Garcia declared she wanted to be "just friends", Haas seemingly raked Viscera in the eye, with Viscera feigning to accidentally Samoan drop Garcia. After Viscera gave Garcia the Samoan drop, both men laughed at what had happened to their now former love interest, turning Viscera and Haas heel. Their team split in December 2006, when Haas and Benjamin reformed the World's Greatest Tag Team.

==== Big Daddy V (2007–2008) ====
On June 17, 2007, Viscera was drafted to the ECW brand in the supplemental section of WWE's draft. He debuted on the July 10 episode of ECW, repackaged as Big Daddy V, a "hired muscle" character in the employ of Matt Striker, attacking The Boogeyman. He defeated Tommy Dreamer on the October 2 episode of ECW in the finals of the Elimination Chase, becoming the number one contender for CM Punk's ECW Championship at No Mercy on October 7. Big Daddy V lost the match by disqualification after interference from Striker. At Armageddon on December 16, Big Daddy V and Mark Henry defeated Punk and Kane.

Big Daddy V was an entrant in the Royal Rumble match at the titular event on January 27, 2008, but was eliminated by Triple H. At No Way Out on February 17, he took part in the Elimination Chamber match for a World Heavyweight Championship match at WrestleMania XXIV, but was eliminated by Batista. He wrestled his last WWE match on the March 11 episode of ECW, losing to Punk in a Money in the Bank qualifying match. In the 2008 WWE Supplemental Draft, he was drafted to the SmackDown brand. Frazier was released from his WWE contract on August 8 before appearing on the brand, ending his third and final tenure with WWE after 4 years.

=== Later career (2008–2013) ===
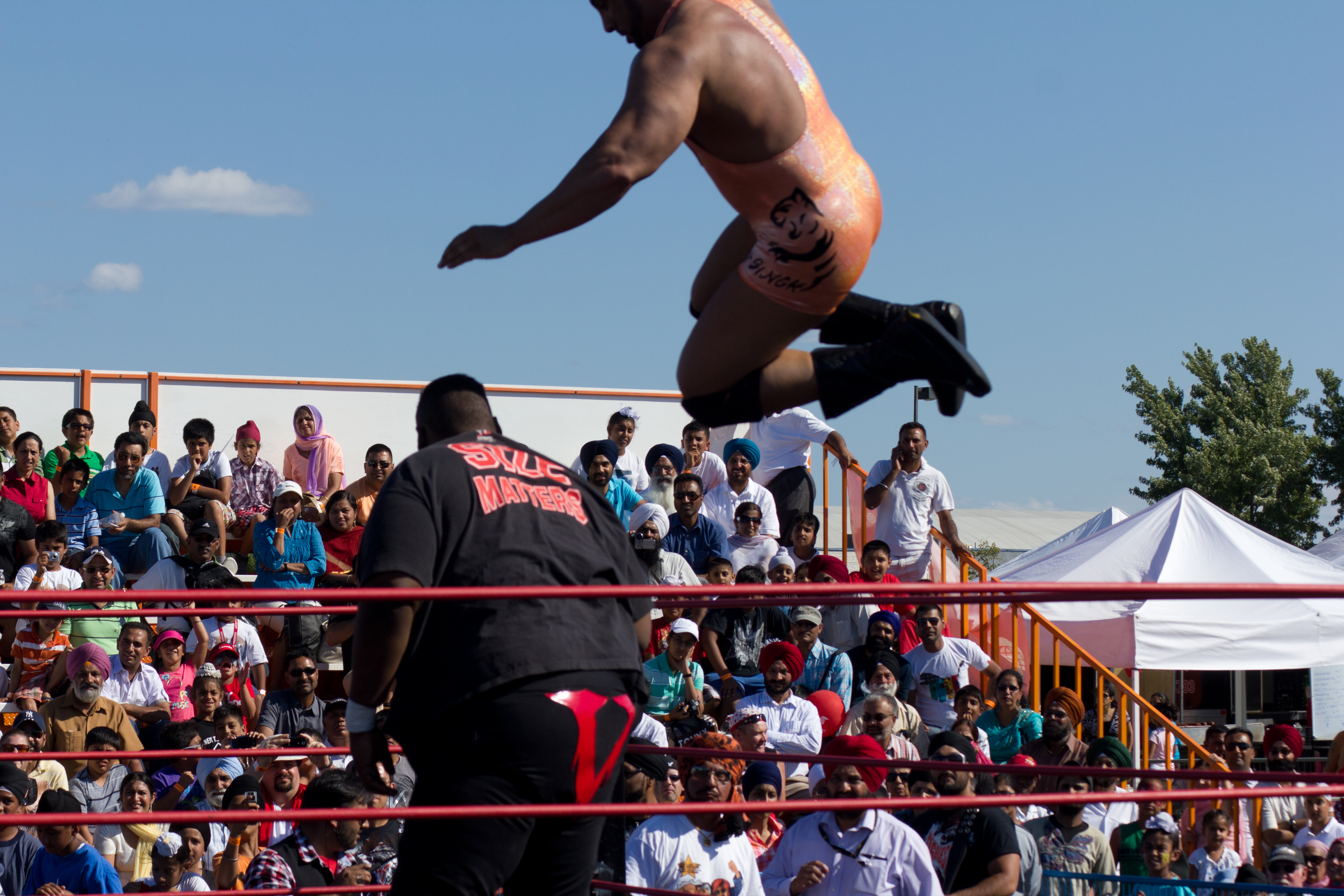
Tiger Ali Singh delivering a bulldog to Frazier in 2012

After his WWE departure, Frazier began wrestling for the National Wrestling Alliance (NWA) as King V. In 2009, he made appearances for National Wrestling Superstars (NWS) in New Jersey and Pro Wrestling Xtreme (PWX) in Tillsonburg, Ontario. On August 8, at Juggalo Championship Wrestling (JCW)'s 10th Annual Gathering of the Juggalos, Viscera defeated 2 Tuff Tony in a "Loser Leaves JCW" match, with Terry Funk as the special guest referee. On April 23, 2011, he appeared for Showtime All-Star Wrestling, teaming with Rosey to defeat Derrick King and Drew Haskins of Derrick King Enterprises, which aired on June 21.

In September 2012, Big Daddy V appeared for the Japanese promotion Inoki Genome Federation (IGF) at their GENOME 22 event, losing to Atsushi Sawada. Frazier performed at three Family Wrestling Entertainment (FWE) shows in 2012 as Big Daddy V, first defeating Malta the Damager in a tables match in February. On October 15, he lost to Malta the Damager in a Street Fight at their Back 2 Brooklyn pay-per-view. Frazier wrestled his final match on October 5, 2013, defeating René Duprée on Qatar Pro Wrestling's inaugural tour.

=== All Japan Pro Wrestling (2010–2011) ===
Frazier wrestled for All Japan Pro Wrestling (AJPW) as part of the Voodoo Murders stable, now under the name Big Daddy Voodoo (later just Big Daddy). He held the All Asia Tag Team Championship with Voodoo Murders stablemate TARU from April 29 to August 29, 2010. He left AJPW in December 2011, after competing in the World's Strongest Tag Determination League with Joe Doering.

== Death and lawsuit ==
Frazier died of a heart attack on February 18, 2014, just four days after his 43rd birthday. He had dropped around 100 pounds and saw his blood pressure drop to a healthy level. He was cremated, and his widow, Cassandra, divided the ashes into 500 pendants as gifts for his loved ones.

On the first anniversary of Viscera's death, his widow filed a wrongful death lawsuit against WWE, alleging that the company had concealed information, misrepresented research, and misinformed Viscera and other wrestlers on performance risks relating to concussions and chronic traumatic encephalopathy (CTE), which the suit claimed left him with severe short-term memory loss, migraines, and depression, which contributed to his death. WWE attorney Jerry McDevitt responded in an interview with the Boston Herald, explaining that the company was considering pursuing action against Cassandra Frazier's attorney, Konstantine Kyros, who has been involved in other lawsuits against WWE. McDevitt called Viscera's death "tragic", but added: "It's ridiculous that someone can ... try to blame someone because a gentleman with a weight problem died of a heart attack in the shower eight years after he last performed." The lawsuit was dismissed by US District Judge Vanessa Lynne Bryant, who ruled that they failed to show that his death was linked to CTE.

== Filmography ==
Year	Title	Role	Notes
2009	National Lampoon's 301: The Legend of Awesomest Maximus	"Ginormous"	
2010	Wrong Side of Town	"Animal"	

== Championships and accomplishments ==
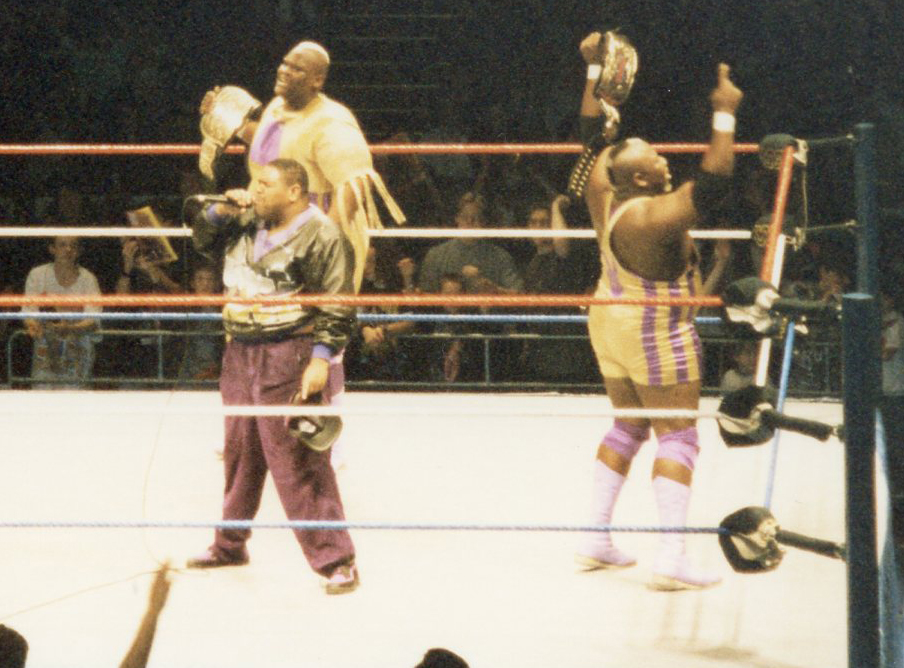
Men on a Mission celebrating their WWF Tag Team championship victory

- All Japan Pro Wrestling
  - All Asia Tag Team Championship (1 time) – with Taru
- Great Championship Wrestling
  - GCW Heavyweight Championship (1 time)
- Memphis Wrestling
  - Memphis Wrestling Southern Heavyweight Championship (1 time)
- Memphis Wrestling Hall of Fame
  - Class of 2022
- Music City Wrestling
  - MCW North American Heavyweight Championship (1 time)
- New England Pro Wrestling Hall of Fame
  - Class of 2013
- Pro Wrestling Federation
  - PWF Tag Team Championship (2 times) – with Bobby Knight
- Pro Wrestling Illustrated
  - Ranked #49 of the top 500 singles wrestlers in the PWI 500 in 1995
  - Ranked #340 of the 500 best singles wrestlers of the PWI Years in 2003
- United States Wrestling Association
  - USWA Heavyweight Championship (1 time)
- World Wrestling Council
  - WWC Universal Heavyweight Championship (1 time)
- World Wrestling Federation
  - WWF Hardcore Championship (1 time)
  - WWF Tag Team Championship (1 time) – with Mo
  - King of the Ring (1995)
- Wrestling Observer Newsletter
  - Worst Feud of the Year (2007) vs. Kane
  - Worst Tag Team (1999) with Mideon
  - Worst Worked Match of the Year (1993) with Mo and The Bushwhackers vs. The Headshrinkers, Bastion Booger, and Bam Bam Bigelow at Survivor Series
- Xcitement Wrestling Federation
  - XWF Heavyweight Championship (1 time)

== See also ==
- List of premature professional wrestling deaths
