= Pro Wrestling Federation =

Defunct American professional wrestling promotion

- Acronym: PWF
- Founded: 1990
- Defunct: 2000
- Style: Rasslin'
- Headquarters: Charlotte/Hickory, North Carolina
- Founder(s): George South; Gary Sabaugh
- Owner(s): Gary Sabaugh (1990-2000)
- Website: ThePWF.com

The Pro Wrestling Federation (PWF) was a professional wrestling promotion that held events in the Carolinas area of the United States from October 1990 to December 2000, when it was run by George South and Gary Sabaugh. The promotion was based in Charlotte, North Carolina, with offices in Hickory, North Carolina. The PWF was consistently ranked among the top independent promotions in the Southern United States by Pro Wrestling Illustrated throughout the 1990s.

== History and overview ==
=== Formation ===
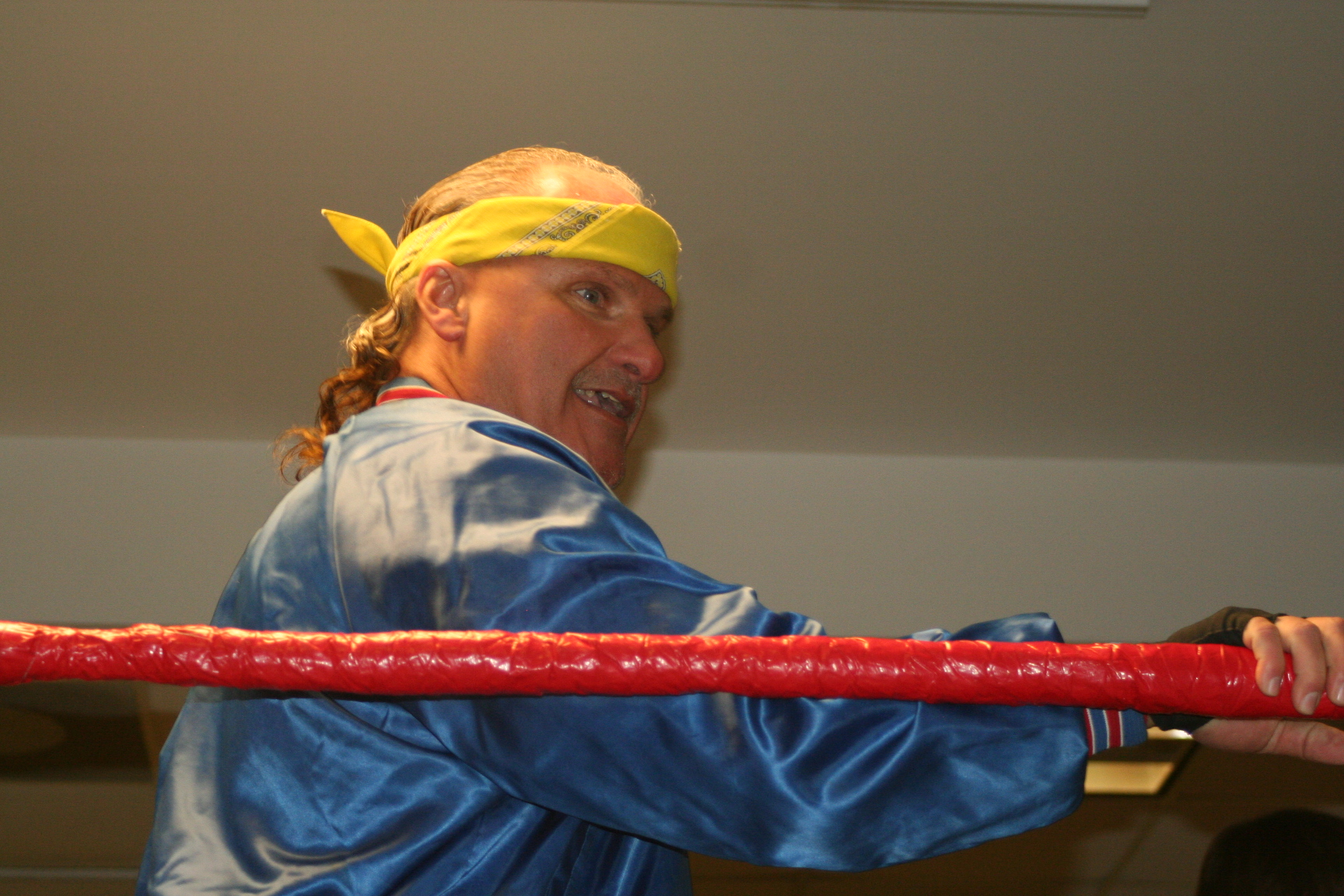
George South was the PWF's top rulebreaker. A born-again Christian, he incorporated elements of evangelical Christianity into his in-ring persona.

The promotion was founded by former Jim Crockett Promotions wrestlers George South and Gary Sabaugh in 1990. During the company's first year in operation, The Russian Assassin was billed as PWF Heavyweight Champion while George South and The Rising Sun were awarded the PWF Tag Team Championship. On June 15, 1991, South also became the first PWF Junior Heavyweight Champion after winning a tournament held in Charlotte. In April 1992, the PWF was named the top independent promotion in the Southeastern United States by Pro Wrestling Illustrated, and was considered among the region's leading companies throughout the decade.

The promotion also had a number of other singles titles including the PWF Lightweight Championship (1992), PWF United States Championship (1993), PWF Southern Championship (1993) and PWF Women's Championship (1992-1993) but these were all short-lived. The first PWF Intercontinental Champion was crowned in a tournament final on January 29, 1994, in Inman, South Carolina, when American G.I. defeated The Russian Assassin. This title was replaced by the PWF Eastern States Heavyweight Championship following a tournament won by Tyrone Knox the following year.

Sabaugh took over the promotion in October 1994. This allowed South to wrestle for other Southern independents, however, he continued to be involved with the PWF and its training school for its entire 9-year run.

=== Territorial reach ===
The PWF's "home territory" was the Carolinas with its live events held in many of the smaller towns once run by the Crockett family in the National Wrestling Alliance's old Mid-Atlantic territory. PWF event tours also included church fundraisers, high school gyms, national guard armories and fairs in cities throughout North and South Carolina, Virginia, and West Virginia. By 1995, the promotion was running at least four shows a week in the Carolinas alone.

In the early-1990s, the promotion filmed two television pilots with hopes of a weekly television series. The PWF was able to get a studio wrestling show on WBTV (Channel 15) in Charlotte, North Carolina but it only lasted six months on the air. One of the two filmed pilots were later released on DVD in the late-2000s.

=== Notable talent ===
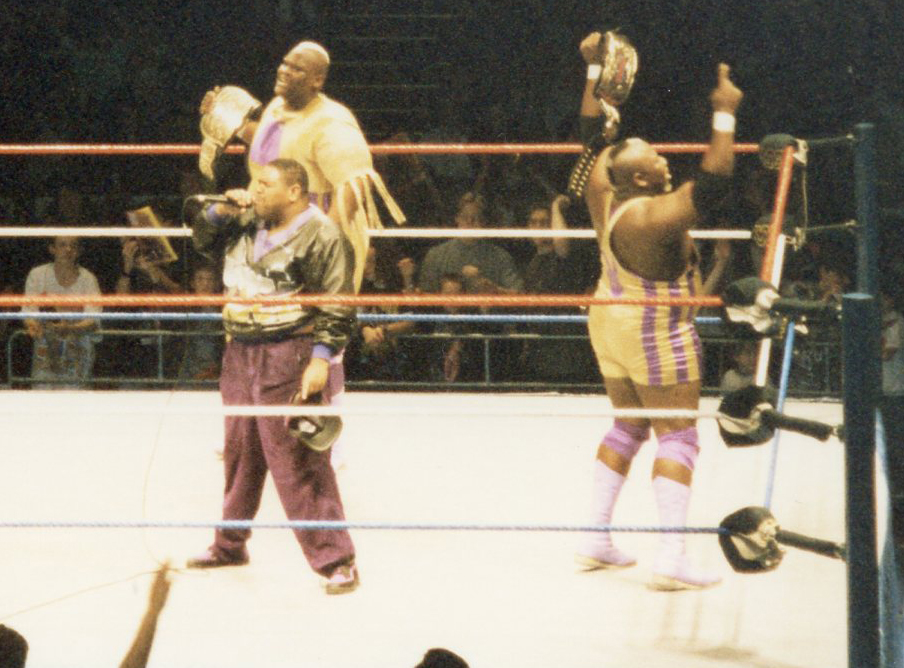
Men on a Mission got their first break in the PWF as a brother tag team called The Harlem Knights. They made a surprise return to the PWF in December 1996, and won the promotion's tag team titles.

The promotion was able to bring in a number of former stars from Jim Crockett Promotions during its early years including, most notably, The Barbarian, Jack Victory, Ron Garvin, Wahoo McDaniel, and The Rock 'n' Roll Express (Ricky Morton and Robert Gibson). Bambi and Peggy Lee Leather from Ladies Professional Wrestling Association also made several appearances during this period. As South and Sabaugh were regulars on WCW television, the two were able to use their connections to bring in The Equalizer, Firebreaker Chip and The Guerreros (Eddie Guerrero and Hector Guerrero) for championship runs in the early-to-mid 1990s.

The PWF featured a number of wrestlers who were regulars in the Southeastern wrestling scene and was the birthplace of Men on a Mission (Mabel and Mo). It also featured a number of younger wrestlers in the Carolinas who had not yet made their mark on a national stage, including Chris Hamrick, Kid Kash (then known as David Jericho), Mike Maverick, Ron Killings, Venom and The Hardy Boyz. Starting in 1993, The Hardys had their first-ever matches in the PWF. Sabaugh was impressed by their high-flying moves but felt they were too inexperienced and lacked basic fundamentals and in-ring psychology. He wanted the brothers to train at their wrestling school, however, the Hardys were unable to afford the $3,000 class fees. They ultimately decided to create their own promotion, OMEGA Championship Wrestling, which operated from 1997 to 1999.

South and Sabaugh's wrestling school, the PWF Training Center, was located in Charlotte, North Carolina. This allowed the promotion to develop its own crew of home grown talent. Some of their early students included Madd Maxxine, Henry O. Godwinn, and referee Charles Robinson who would later go on to join the World Wrestling Federation.

=== Style and controversy ===
The biggest heat I get is if I tell someone that I'm going to take them to church with me. That gets more heat than anything I've ever seen, more than if you cussed them to death. They've had to pull many of them out of that ring, and I've had policemen ask me what in the world I said to them. I told them that I just invited them to church.

– George South, George South: No Heel Outside The Ring (1997)

The PWF presented a family friendly version of traditional Southern-style Rasslin' catering to the region's large Southern Baptist community. South, a born-again Christian, portrayed the PWF's main "heel" performer. He incorporated elements of evangelical Christianity not only in his in-ring persona but the promotion's live events as well. Many of their benefit shows and fundraisers took place at local churches throughout the South Atlantic region. One of these shows was held at Northside Baptist Church on December 12, 1992, before 2,050 people.

The promotion was active in regional community outreach programs, particularly those involving sick and needy children. As part of an anti-drug campaign, the PWF held free wrestling shows for children at schools throughout West Virginia. Prior to the matches, George South and The Italian Stallion spoke to the students on the dangers of drug abuse. One of these shows was covered by Pro Wrestling Illustrated. On November 12, 1993, a free children's show in Richmond, Virginia was attended by 2,000. A month later, the PWF held one of its first major supercards, Pro WrestleMania II, seen by 4,500 fans at the Charlotte Coliseum. Due to his charity work, South was among the top candidates for the 1994 PWI Inspirational Wrestler of the Year.

The PWF's main storyline revolved around the long-running feud between George South and The Italian Stallion. They initially fought over the PWF Heavyweight Championship, however, their rivalry would go through many twists and turns as time went on. In June 1994, South and The Italian Stallion briefly teamed to win the PWF Tag Team Championship and held the belts for six months. Stallion chose to surrender the PWF Heavyweight Championship in order to defend the tag titles with the newly reformed South. They were among the nominees for 1994 PWI Tag Team of the Year. The two eventually went back to fighting each other, with South winning the Stallion's title several times over the next two years, and at one point female wrestler Madd Maxxine (not to be confused with the 1980s WWF wrestler) became involved in the feud.

Years before Chyna's debut in the World Wrestling Federation, the 450-lbs. Maxine was presented as a serious challenger to male wrestlers. She was voted third runner-up for the 1995 PWI Rookie of the Year and the third ever women to make it into the annual PWI 500 after Miss Texas (1993) and Luna Vachon (1995). In August 1996, she won the promotion's junior heavyweight title, and was undefeated for nearly two years. Maxxine was later joined by her controlling mother Mama Maxxine as a manager. The intergender wrestling storyline received coverage from Pro Wrestling Illustrated and other wrestling magazines of the period. For much of the 1990s, the PWF was ranked among the top independent promotions in the Southern United States along with Smoky Mountain Wrestling and the United States Wrestling Association among others. Many of its wrestlers, including Madd Maxxine, were regularly featured in the PWI 500 from 1992 to 1998.

=== Association with the World Wrestling Federation ===
The PWF had a loose association with the World Wrestling Federation during the early-to-mid 1990s. They worked directly with WWF agents George "The Animal" Steele, Rene Goulet and Tony Garea. Sabaugh, who was also appearing for the WWF as a preliminary wrestler, brought groups of 12-15 PWF wrestlers (many of whom were his students) for WWF television tapings. In addition to being paid by the WWF for traveling expenses, Sabaugh also collected a $100 booking fee from the wrestlers. According to Matt Hardy, Sabaugh abandoned he and his brother in Charlotte, North Carolina after arranging to traveling to a show in Macon, Georgia. The Hardys later had a falling out with Sabaugh when he demanded to collect their $100 fee, and they reported the incident to WWF official Bruce Prichard. It was decided that the promotion would contact the brothers directly instead of calling Sabaugh. Sabaugh was released by the WWF shortly afterwards, partly due to the incident, and formerly ending its relationship with the PWF. The Hardy Boys eventually signed with WWF full-time in May 1998.

=== Demise ===
While it enjoyed a cult following in Appalachia and the Southeastern U.S., and garnered positive exposure from mainstream media outlets and pro wrestling publications, the PWF struggled financially for much of its history. PWF wrestlers typically performed for free including its biggest stars, such as The Harlem Knights. Charles Robinson noted that oftentimes the best the roster could hope for was "a hotdog and soft drink on a good night, plus gas money". According to George South, the situation worsened when Extreme Championship Wrestling arrived in the area during the late-1990s. The company's violent "hardcore wrestling" caused many high schools and other buildings to prohibit pro wrestling shows which South referred to as "the ECW rule". The PWF and other local promotions relied on these venues, particularly for "sold shows", as a revenue source. The promotion finally closed its doors at the end of 2000. Sabaugh, who was burned out and going through a divorce at the time, cited his decision to leave the industry as the main reason for the PWF shutting down.

In June 2019, it was announced on Facebook.com that a documentary film about the PWF was in production. Wrestling historian Jason Freeman and filmmaker Michael Elliot were attached to the project. The documentary was released on DVD the following year.

== Exodus Wrestling Alliance ==
After his partnership with Sabaugh ended, South established a new promotion called the Exodus Wrestling Alliance in Concord, North Carolina. The EWA operated from 2000 to 2015 and set a number of record-breaking shows in the early-2000s. On February 21, 2004, Night of the Legends: Beauty and the Beasts was held at Spartanburg Memorial Auditorium as part of a co-promotion with Miss South Carolina. Attended by 1,350 fans, South and The Masked Superstar battled The Rock 'n' Roll Express (Ricky Morton and Robert Gibson) in the main event with Tommy Young as special referee. It was among the largest shows of the year on the U.S. independent circuit.

== Championships and programming ==
=== Championships ===
| Championship | Date of entry | First champion | Date retired | Final champion | Years active | Notes |
|---|---|---|---|---|---|---|
| PWF Heavyweight Championship | March 1990 | Russian Assassin | October 2000 | The Italian Stallion | 10 | |
| PWF Tag Team Championship | March 1990 | George South and The Rising Sun | October 2000 | Dark Angel and American G.I. | 10 | |
| PWF Junior Heavyweight Championship | June 1991 | George South | October 2000 | Shawn Blanton | 9 | |
| PWF Eastern States Championship | January 1994 | American G.I. | October 2000 | American G.I. | 6 | The title was originally known as the PWF Intercontinental Heavyweight Championship It was renamed following a tournament in January 1995. |
| PWF Lightweight Championship | December, 1992 (n) | Scotty Hardbody | N/A | N/A | N/A | |
| PWF United States Championship | January, 1993 (n) | Austin Steele | N/A | N/A | N/A | |
| PWF Southern Championship | April 16, 1993 | Killdozer | N/A | N/A | N/A | Killdozer was the only champion and the title was abandoned without a formal announcement. |
| PWF Women's Championship | February, 1992 (n) | Pocahantas | July 13, 1993 | Bambi | N/A | The title was retired without a formal announcement. |

=== Programming ===
| Programming | Notes |
|---|---|
| Pro Wrestling Federation | (1991) Broadcast exclusively on WBTV. |
| Pro Wrestling Federation | (1999–2000) Broadcast exclusively on IBTV.net. |

== See also ==
- List of independent wrestling promotions in the United States
