= Northside Christian Academy =

Location
- 333 Jeremiah Blvd; Charlotte, North Carolina 28262; United States; 35°17′5″N 80°47′1″W

Information
- Type: Private; college-preparatory; day; Christian school
- Religious affiliation: Protestant Christian
- Denomination: Baptist
- Established: 1961
- Grades: K–12
- Gender: Co-educational
- Campus type: Suburban
- Colors: Red, black, and white
- Athletics: North Carolina Independent Schools Athletic Association (NCISAA)
- Mascot: Knight
- Nickname: Knights
- Accreditation: ACSI; GCACS; SACS; AdvancED; North Carolina Association of Christian Schools (NCACS)
- Tuition: K–5: $9,850; 6–8: $10,500; 9–12: $11,650; International students: $17,200
- Affiliation: Northside Baptist Church
- Website: ncaknights.com

Northside Christian Academy was a private Christian school serving grades pre-kindergarten through 12th grade before its closure in 2024. It was located in Charlotte, North Carolina. It was accredited by the Association of Christian Schools International, the Southern Association of Colleges and Schools, AdvancED and the North Carolina Association of Christian Schools. The school was founded in 1961 as a ministry of Northside Baptist Church. The school mascot was the Knight and sports teams are known as the Knights.

== History ==
Northside Christian Academy has been described as a segregation academy when it first opened in 1961. It has since changed, and does not discriminate enrollment on the basis of race, color, national or ethnic origin in administration of its educational policies, admission policies, scholarship and loan programs, and athletic and other school administrated programs.

== Athletics ==
Athletically, the Knights competed at the NCISAA class 1A/2A state level, and belong to the Metrolina Athletic Conference (MAC).

The Northside Knights men's basketball program has won multiple NCISAA titles within the last 5 seasons, led by head coach and former NBA player, Byron Dinkins. The women's basketball team has also been successful, under the leadership of head coach and former collegiate player, Ashley McGuirt. Additionally, the men's track team has consistently been competitive, winning the 2004 and 2007 NCISAA Championship for 1A and 2A schools. The girls' track team has fared well, also, finishing in second in the 2007 NCISAA Track Meet. The track and field program as a whole has been considered the backbone of the athletic program in its most recent years as it has proven to be the most consistently successful and competitive team in the 40 plus years of the school's athletic existence.

== Notable alumni ==
- Justin Gordon (graduated 2012) - professional basketball player
- Keyshawn Woods (graduated 2014) - professional basketball player
- Rayjon Tucker (graduated 2015) - NBA player
- Ty-Shon Alexander (Class of 2017/transferred) - NBA player
- Nate Hinton (Class of 2018/transferred) - NBA player
- Jalen Hood-Schifino (Class of 2022/transferred) - NBA player
