= The Italian Stallion (wrestler) =

American professional wrestler (born 1957)

Personal information
- Born: Gary Sabaugh; October 24, 1957 (age 68) North Carolina, U.S.

Professional wrestling career
- Ring name(s): The Italian Stallion; Gary Sabaugh
- Billed height: 6 ft 3 in (1.91 m)
- Billed weight: 265 lb (120 kg)
- Debut: 1984
- Retired: 2000

Gary Sabaugh (born October 24, 1957) is an American former professional wrestler, better known by his ring name, The Italian Stallion, who has competed in North American independent promotions throughout the 1980s and 1990s including stints in both the World Wrestling Federation and the National Wrestling Alliance, specifically Jim Crockett Promotions and World Championship Wrestling.

He is also the co-owner of the Charlotte-based Professional Wrestling Federation and its wrestling school with longtime rival George South. Among the wrestlers he and South have trained over the years include Henry Godwin, Ron Killings and the Hardy Boyz. He was instrumental in bringing the latter to the WWF in 1994.

== Professional wrestling career ==
Gary Sabaugh, also known as the pro wrestler The Italian Stallion, has had many television appearances in the NWA, WCW, WWF, Georgia Championship Wrestling with WTBS, Florida Championship Wrestling, and New Japan Pro Wrestling. In addition to a 23-year-career in professional wrestling, Sabaugh was also a sitcom actor and stunt man.

=== Jim Crockett Promotions (1984–1988) ===
Teaming with Buzz Sawyer and "Pistol" Pez Whatley against Bob Roop and NWA National Tag Team Champions Ole and Arn Anderson on May 11, he would face a number of veteran wrestlers throughout 1985 including Terry Flynn, Black Bart, and appeared at the first Starcade '85 losing to Thunderfoot#1 on November 28. Two days later, he also teamed with Rocky King against The Midnight Express on November 30, 1985.

Teaming with Koko B. Ware during the first annual Jim Crockett, Sr. Memorial Cup Tournament in April 1986, they were defeated in the opening round by Buzz Sawyer and Rick Steiner.

The following year, he and Ricky Lee Jones lost to Ronnie & Jimmy Garvin in the opening rounds of the second annual Jim Crockett, Sr. Memorial Cup Tournament on April 11, 1987.

In his third appearance at the Jim Crockett, Sr. Memorial Cup Tournament, he and Kendall Windham would defeat Green Machine and Terminator by forfeit on before losing to Arn Anderson & Tully Blanchard in the quarterfinals in April 1988.

=== World Championship Wrestling (1988–1991) ===
Sabaugh continued working for World Championship Wrestling (WCW), which was Jim Crockett Promotions renamed after the latter's sale to Ted Turner in November 1988. Sabaugh would wrestle members of The Varsity Club facing Mike Rotunda in late 1988 and team with "Dr. Death" Steve Williams and Nikita Koloff in a 6-man tag team match against Rotunda, Rick Steiner and Al Perez on September 25 before losing to Steve Williams at Clash of the Champions IV on December 7, 1988.

During that year, he was the wrestling advisor for the short-lived sitcom Learning the Ropes and, along with "Dr. Death" Steve Williams, was a stunt double for the Lyle Alzado's character The Masked Maniac.

He would team with Brett Sawyer and The Nasty Boys in an 8-man tag team match against Johnny Ace, The Terminator and Southern Force on March 11, 1989.

Appearing less often during the early 1990s, making an appearance on WCW Power Hour teamed with Reno Riggins against The Fabulous Freebirds on January 19, he was absent from WCW television for much of 1991. Sabough went on working for other companies.

=== Return to World Championship Wrestling (1992–1993, 1995) ===
His WCW appearances increased in 1992, and included a bout for the World Tag Team Championship on September 15 in Macon, Georgia, teaming with Ricky Nelson in a losing effort against Steve Williams and Terry Gordy. Sabaugh wrestled one match as a heel managed by Paul E. Dangerously known as The Masked Intruder losing to Erik Watts. He would contest the following year for the Television Championship, losing to "Mr. Wonderful" Paul Orndorff on April 3, 1993, and twice more for Tag Team Championship, partnering with Chris Sullivan on April 6 and Rex Cooper on April 27, losing both times to The Hollywood Blonds. Sabaugh's last appearance for WCW would be with George South in a tag team match against Kent & Keith Cole at a house show at the Brushfork Armory in Bluefield, West Virginia on August 20, 1993.

He returned to WCW for two TV taping in July 1995.

=== World Wrestling Federation (1990, 1993–1995) ===
Sabaugh made an appearance in 1990 when he teamed with Frankie Valdez losing to Rhythm and Blues.

Sabaugh would also wrestle for a time in the World Wrestling Federation from 1993 to 1995. He fought against Shawn Michaels, Owen Hart, Bam Bam Bigelow, Jeff Jarrett, Diesel, and King Kong Bundy.

Though he would never get higher than lower mid-card status, he did help a very young Matt & Jeff Hardy break into the WWF as jobbers. Though the Hardys would make $150 per appearance as jobbers, Sabaugh would charge them $100 per appearance. According to Matt Hardy in the 2008 DVD Twist of Fate: The Matt & Jeff Hardy Story, Sabaugh ended up leaving the Hardys stranded in Charlotte, North Carolina where the three were supposed to meet before traveling to a show in Macon, Georgia. In the process, Sabaugh left the Hardys to fend for themselves, but still wanted to collect the $100 per appearance fee from the boys. Matt later told Bruce Prichard about what happened, and the WWF would contact the Hardys directly thereafter for jobbing before the two would eventually sign with WWF full-time in 1998. Sabaugh was released afterwards partially due to the incident.

=== Later career (1990–1997) ===
Sabaugh and wrestler George South founded the Professional Wrestling Federation in 1990. Originally based in Charlotte, North Carolina, the Promotion ran shows in the old Crockett territories in North and South Carolina, Virginia and West Virginia until its closure in 1999. Sabaugh and South would continue their decade-long feud while in PWF, which involved female wrestlers Mad Maxine and her mother Mama Maxine for a time, trading the PWF heavyweight title several times and at one point forming a tag team with South, winning the tag team titles before they began fighting each other again.

Sabaugh's last match would be a successful defense of the PWF Heavyweight against George South on March 29, 1997 at The Armory in Greer, South Carolina.

== Championships and accomplishments ==
- Pro Wrestling Federation
  - PWF Heavyweight Championship (4 times)
  - PWF Tag Team Championship (4 times) with Ron Garvin and George South
- Pro Wrestling Illustrated
  - PWI ranked him # 213 of the 500 best singles wrestlers of the PWI 500 in 1994
