= Cole Twins =

Professional wrestling tag team

The Cole Twins

Tag team
- Name(s): Cole Twins; Kent and Keith Cole; Kohl Brothers; Keith and Kent Kohl
- Members: Kent Cole; Keith Cole
- Billed heights: Kent: 6 ft 2 in (1.88 m); Keith: 6 ft 2 in (1.88 m)
- Combined billed weight: 524 pounds (238 kg); Kent: 262 pounds (119 kg); Keith: 262 pounds (119 kg)
- Debut: 1992
- Disbanded: 2001

The Cole Twins were a professional wrestling tag team consisting of twin brothers Kent and Keith Cole. They competed in North American regional and independent promotions, however the twins were best known for their stint in World Championship Wrestling during the early 1990s. During their time in WCW, they feuded with several tag teams including Tex Slazenger and Shanghai Pierce, The Wrecking Crew (Rage and Fury), Harlem Heat (Booker T and Stevie Ray) and The Hollywood Blonds (Brian Pillman and Steve Austin).

== Career ==
=== World Championship Wrestling (1992–1994) ===
Brought in as a regular tag team by then booker Dusty Rhodes in late 1992, the Cole Twins would frequently appear on WCW Saturday Night, WCW Main Event and WCW Worldwide during the next year. In early 1993, Keith Cole wrestled without his brother such as, on January 11, he teamed with Chris Sullivan who lost to The Wrecking Crew (Rage and Fury) at the Center Stage Theatre in Atlanta, Georgia on January 11, 1993. On February 2, he lost a singles match to Maxx Payne and, at the same event, served as one of twelve "lumberjacks" in the main event between Ricky "The Dragon" Steamboat and "Flyin'" Brian Pillman. The other wrestlers included Steve Regal, Marcus Bagwell, Robbie V, Shane Douglas, 2 Cold Scorpio, Vinnie Vegas, Steve Austin, Shanghai Pierce and Tex Slazenger and Cactus Jack and Maxx Payne. Later that month, Keith and Kent Cole defeated The Wrecking Crew when the twins scored a roll-up pin after narrowly avoiding their opponent's "Wrecking Ball" finisher.

On March 8, Tex Slazenger and Shanghai Pierce challenged the Cole Twins to a match after defeating their scheduled opponents Bobby Baker and Scott McKeever. Moments later, Grizzly Smith walked out to the ring and agreed to sanction a match for 5 minutes. The twins immediately came out cleared Slazenger and Pierce from the ring. After Shanghai Pierce was pinned after a double dropkick, the Cole Twins fended off an attack from The Wrecking Crew as well as Tex Slazenger and Shanghai Pierce who managed to escape from the ring. On the same show, the debuting Harris Brothers (Ron and Don Harris) called out the Cole Twins during a post-match interview with Jesse Ventura to see who were the better of the twin brother teams. This match never came about however.

On WCW Saturday Night, he and Kent also defeated Buddy Lee Parker and Bob Cook in Alexandria, Louisiana on March 17. Three days later at a house show in Gadsden, Alabama, Keith Cole fought Steve Regal to a 10-minute time limit draw. On April 27, Keith and Kent Cole teamed with 2 Cold Scorpio and Marcus Alexander Bagwell in an 8-man tag team match against The Wrecking Crew, and Tex Slazenger and Shanghai Pierce. The Coles' were eventually disqualified when the referee spotted one of the twins holding a cow bell that Slazenger was attempting to use in the match. That same day in Gainesville, Georgia, the twins defeated Chris Benoit and Bobby Eaton.

On April 30, the twins wrestled in separate matches at a house show held at the Dorton Arena in Raleigh, North Carolina. Kent Cole defeated Fury while Keith Cole lost to Maxx Payne. Defeating Tony Vincent and Mustafa Saied on WCW Saturday Night, they also beat The Wrecking Crew at house shows in Harrisonburg, Virginia, New Orleans and Baltimore. They also traded matches with Vinnie Vegas and Big Sky at a May 15 television taping in Anderson, South Carolina that aired on WCW Power Hour in June. At another house show in Philadelphia, the Cole Twins defeated Bob Starr and Joey Maggs on May 21. On June 3, the Cole Twins faced Tex Slazenger and Shanghai Pierce at Spartanburg High School in Spartanburg, South Carolina and fought to a 20-minute time limit draw. They later defeated them at Kings Mountain, North Carolina three days later.

In early July, the twins took part in television tapings at Universal Studios in Orlando, Florida which would air on WCW Worldwide in late August and September. During the 3-day event, Keith Cole would lose to Yoshi Kwan and Steve Regal while defeating Tex Slazenger and Shanghai Pierce on July 10. At an event in Lake Charles, Louisiana, Keith and Kent Cole also defeated Chris Benoit and Bobby Eaton on July 24. They would receive a title shot against then WCW World Tag Team Champions The Hollywood Blonds (Brian Pillman and Steve Austin) later that month losing to them at a television taping in Anderson on July 27.

On August 1, Keith and Kent Cole defeated Brian Costello and Barry Starr on WCW Worldwide. Losing to Bobby Eaton and Brian Knobs at The Omni in Atlanta on August 15, they defeated George South and The Italian Stallion at the Brushfork Armory in Bluefield, West Virginia several days later. On the August 30 edition of WCW Saturday Night, the twins defeated Harlem Heat (Booker T and Stevie Ray) via reverse-decision when referee Nick Patrick disqualified Harlem Heat for throwing the Cole Twins over the top rope after they had won the match by pinfall. Earlier that night, they had also acted as "lumberjacks" during a match between Charlie Norris and Maxx Payne. Ricky Steamboat, Paul Orndorff, The Equalizer, Brad Armstrong and Tex Slazenger and Shanghai Pierce were also present.

On September 10, the Cole Twins and "Jungle" Jim Steele lost to Harlem Heat and Sid Vicious (with manager Colonel Robert Parker) when Vicious pinned Steele after a powerbomb. This 6-man tag team match was taped in Macon, Georgia and used for the main events in WCW Main Event and WCW Power Hour that week. Keith Cole also teamed with Johnny B. Badd against Tex Slazenger and Shanghai Pierce in Kennesaw, Georgia on September 21. Keith Cole would also make his PPV debut appearing at Battlebowl '93 as the tag team partner of Ron Simmons during the "Lethal Lottery". He and Simmons were eliminated by Sting and WCW World Tag Team Champion Jerry Sags (with Missy Hyatt) when Saggs pinned Cole after a top-rope elbow drop. Following the match, Simmons attacked Cole with a spinebuster.

On January 3, 1994, the Cole Twins lost to Tex Slazenger and Shanghai Pierce at the Georgia Mountain Center in Gainesville, Georgia. The match would be aired on WCW Main Event as the main event later that week. The twins would make their last appearance as a team losing to Harlem Heat on WCW Main Event in Columbus, Georgia on January 18. Keith Cole would also face Terra Ryzing in his WCW debut at the Center Stage Theatre in Atlanta on February 1, 1994.

=== Later years (2000–2001) ===
After a six-year absence from wrestling, the twins debuted in NWA Wildside as the Kohl Brothers in mid-2000. Facing Total Destruction (Rusty Riddle and Sean Royal) on August 27 and in a Tag Rumble on September 9, they continued appearing on the promotion's weekly television show for the rest of the year facing Ultimate Creation (Jason Ultima and Perfect Creation) and NWA Wildside Tag Team Champions The Boogaloo Crew (Scottie Wrenn and J.C. Dazz) defending them for the titles in Cornelia, Georgia on February 3. Briefly losing the titles to Romeo Bliss and David Flair on March 24, they regained the titles in a handicap match against Romeo Bliss on April 21. After a near four-month reign as champions, they eventually lost the titles to TNT (Todd Sexton and Tony Stradlin) on August 4, 2001. In one of their last matches in the promotion, they faced TNT and the Lost Boyz (Azrael and Gabriel) in a three-way match before quietly leaving the promotion soon after.

== Championships and accomplishments ==
- NWA Wildside

- NWA Wildside Tag Team Championship (2 times)

- Pro Wrestling Illustrated

- Rookie of the Year (1993, 2nd runners up)
- PWI ranked Keith Cole # 187 of the 500 best singles wrestlers of the PWI 500 in 1993.
- PWI ranked Kent Cole # 190 of the 500 best singles wrestlers of the PWI 500 in 1993.
