= Northside Baptist Church =

Church in Charlotte, North Carolina, US

Coordinates: 35°17′5″N 80°47′1″W

Northside Baptist Church is an Independent Baptist church located in Charlotte, North Carolina, United States. and was once the city's largest church, as well as the first "superchurch" in The Carolinas.

== History ==
Started in 1954 by Rev. Jack Hudson, the church grew from "29 members in a tar-paper building on Old Concord Road" to 4800 members, the first church that large in the city, and at its peak, 6400 members. The current building is a domed facility that includes a 3400-seat sanctuary. Hudson retired June 3, 1990 due to health problems. Rev. Bradley Price succeeded Hudson. Price left in 1998 after attendance had dropped to 2000 and membership was 4000. Though he said he was not "forced out", there was controversy during his final months. While Price described himself as "exhausted", he felt better after several months and, after he was asked to start a new church, King's Way Baptist began in a hotel in 1999 with 262 members, many who followed him from Northside. By the time Rev. Dan Burrell took over as pastor, attendance was down to 1100. Northside started Northside Christian Academy. Northside had over 2000 members as of 2007. As of 2023 the church has 200 members who still attend.
