= Henry O. Godwinn =

American professional wrestler (born 1964)

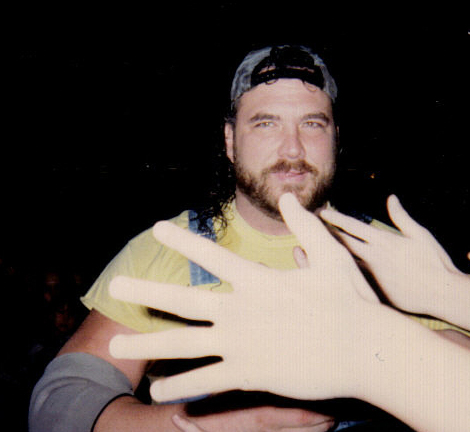
- Canterbury in 1995

Personal information
- Born: Mark Canterbury; March 16, 1964 (age 62) Washington, D.C., U.S.
- Children: 2

Professional wrestling career
- Ring name(s): Henry O. Godwinn; Mark Canterbury; Master Blaster; Shanghai Pierce
- Billed height: 6 ft 4 in (193 cm)
- Billed weight: 293 lb (133 kg)
- Billed from: Amarillo, Texas (as Shanghai Pierce) "Bitters, Arkansas" (as Henry O. Godwinn)
- Trained by: George South; The Italian Stallion
- Debut: 1989
- Retired: 2022

Mark Canterbury (born March 16, 1964) is an American retired professional wrestler. He is best known for his appearances with the World Wrestling Federation (WWF, now WWE) in the mid to late 1990s under the ring name Henry O. Godwinn. He is also known for his appearances with World Championship Wrestling in the early 1990s as Shanghai Pierce.

== Professional wrestling career ==
=== Early career (1989–1992) ===
Canterbury trained under George South and The Italian Stallion before debuting in 1989 under the ring name "Mean" Mark Canterbury. He quickly formed a tag team with Dennis Knight wrestling under the name Tex Slazenger.

=== World Championship Wrestling (1992–1994) ===
In October 1992, the duo began wrestling for World Championship Wrestling, with Canterbury adopting the ring name "Shanghai Pierce". Dusty Rhodes suggested that Canterbury wear a mask because Canterbury's good looks could make him too likable for the heel tag team. They remained with the promotion until 1994, with Pierce forced to unmask on the January 29 edition of WCW Saturday Night after losing to Johnny B. Badd.

=== World Wrestling Federation (1994–1998) ===
==== Singles competition (1994–1995) ====
In November 1994, Canterbury joined the World Wrestling Federation (WWF), where he was renamed "Henry Orpheus Godwinn" (the initials spelling "H.O.G."; his middle name "Orpheus" was never said on television) and given the gimmick of an Arkansan pig farmer who carried a bucket of "slop" to the ring, which he would throw upon his opponents. Canterbury was originally a heel, and assisted the Million Dollar Corporation on several occasions. When the leader of the Corporation, Ted DiBiase, was asked on an episode of WWF Action Zone whether or not Canterbury was a member of the Corporation, DiBiase insulted Canterbury. This inspired Canterbury to turn face by "slopping" DiBiase, and led to a brief feud between Canterbury and Corporation member Sycho Sid.

Godwinn engaged in a feud with the aristocratic Hunter Hearst Helmsley. The feud culminated in December 1995 in an "Arkansas Hog Pen match" that Helmsley won and after which Godwinn tossed Helmsley into the slop.

==== The Godwinns and Southern Justice (1996–1998) ====
In January 1996, Canterbury was reunited with Knight, who had been renamed Phineas I. Godwinn. The duo were portrayed as being cousins (later brothers) and were collectively known as "The Godwinns". The two were faces and were managed by Hillbilly Jim. They began to feud with the Body Donnas with Phineas having a crush on Sunny and signed her as their manager. They would beat the Body Donnas for the WWF Tag Team Championships. Eventually Sunny turned on them costing them their titles. The Godwinns feuded with the now heel Smoking Gunns, in losing efforts. In 1997, the Godwinns began a heel turn dropping Hillbilly Jim as a manager and picking up Uncle Cletus. The Godwinns quickly won the tag titles a second time from The Headbangers and began a heated feud with the Legion of Doom, which saw the team attempt to break Road Warrior Hawk's neck. They eventually dropped the titles to LOD in a match on WWF Monday Night Raw that had LOD's career on the line. Soon after that match they attacked and fired Cletus.

In 1997, in a rematch between The Godwinns and the Legion of Doom, Canterbury cracked his C7 vertebra when he fell on his head after taking the Doomsday Device. He was advised by doctors to rest for fifteen weeks, but returned to the ring in less than eight weeks.

In 1998, Canterbury entered the Brawl for All, a shoot-fighting tournament held by the WWF. He lost in the first round to Bradshaw.

Later that year, the Godwinns dropped their pig farmer gimmicks, now going by their real names and wearing sharp suits under the name "Southern Justice", the bodyguards of Tennessee Lee and Jeff Jarrett. Six months later, Canterbury herniated his C7 vertebra and pinched a spinal nerve, necessitating spinal fusion surgery. This came as a result of him returning to the ring too early after his neck injury. He eventually left the WWF and retired, due to the neck injury suffered in September 1998.

=== Return to WWE (2006–2007, 2020) ===
==== Deep South Wrestling (2006–2007) ====
In September 2006, Canterbury wrestled several tryout matches with World Wrestling Entertainment. On September 15, 2006, WWE announced that he had been signed to a contract. He debuted in Deep South Wrestling on November 30 as a tag partner for Ray Gordy. Gordy was known as Cousin Ray and they both reformed The Godwinns. Since both Gordy and Drew Hankinson went to the SmackDown brand, however, Godwinn's role remained uncertain.

On May 19, 2007, the Wrestling Observer reported that Canterbury had been released from his developmental contract.

==== Survivor Series (2020) ====
On November 22, 2020, Canterbury returned to WWE together with Phineas I. Godwinn as The Godwinns, to take part in The Undertaker's retirement ceremony at Survivor Series. Several other members of the Bone Street Krew also appeared to pay tribute.

=== Independent Circuit (2009–2010) ===
After a two-year hiatus from wrestling, Canterbury returned to wrestling as Shanghai Pierce in 2009. He lost to Jimmy Valiant on March 7, 2009, at Bruiser Wrestling Federation in Farmville, Virginia. On July 25, 2010, he teamed with Frank Parker as they lost to Reid Flair and Ricky Morton for SSW WrestleFest 2010 in Kingsport, Tennessee.

=== Return to Wrestling (2017–2022) ===
As Henry O. Godwinn, Canterbury made appearances wrestling for the IWC (International Wrestling Cartel) in the mid-summer of 2021. He wrestled on September 5, 2021, against Chase Gold and Ella Shae with a random tag team partner in Elizabeth, PA at their Unbreakable event.

== Personal life ==
Canterbury lives in Monroe County, West Virginia, and has two sons Shane and Jordan. Both sons played football for Pigeon Forge High School. On October 31, 2003, when Shane was a senior and Jordan a freshman, Jordan was accidentally shot and killed by a friend in Pigeon Forge, Tennessee. It was a tragedy that bonded the school. Mark and Jordan's older brother Shane established the Jordan Canterbury Scholarship in his honor, and there is a rock known as "Jordie's rock" dedicated to him at Pigeon Forge High School. Every game night each teammate touches the rock on their way to the field. On November 9, 2011, Mark Canterbury suffered two punctured lungs, thirteen broken ribs and a broken leg in a car accident.

In July 2016, Canterbury was named part of a class action lawsuit filed against WWE which alleged that wrestlers incurred traumatic brain injuries during their tenure and that the company concealed the risks of injury. The suit was litigated by attorney Konstantine Kyros, who has been involved in a number of other lawsuits against WWE. US District Judge Vanessa Lynne Bryant dismissed the case in September 2018.

== Championships and accomplishments ==
- International Championship Wrestling Alliance
  - ICWA Tag Team Championship (1 Time) – with Crash the Terminator
- Pro Wrestling Federation
  - PWF Tag Team Championship (2 times) – with George South and Texas Outlaw
- Pro Wrestling Illustrated
  - PWI ranked him #106 of the top 500 singles wrestlers in the PWI 500 in 1996
- Wrestling Observer Newsletter
  - Worst Tag Team (1996, 1997) with Phineas I. Godwinn
- World Wrestling Federation
  - WWF Tag Team Championship (2 times) – with Phineas I. Godwinn
  - Slammy Award (1 time)
    - Most Smelliest (1994) – Tied with Duke Droese
