= George South =

American professional wrestler (born 1962)

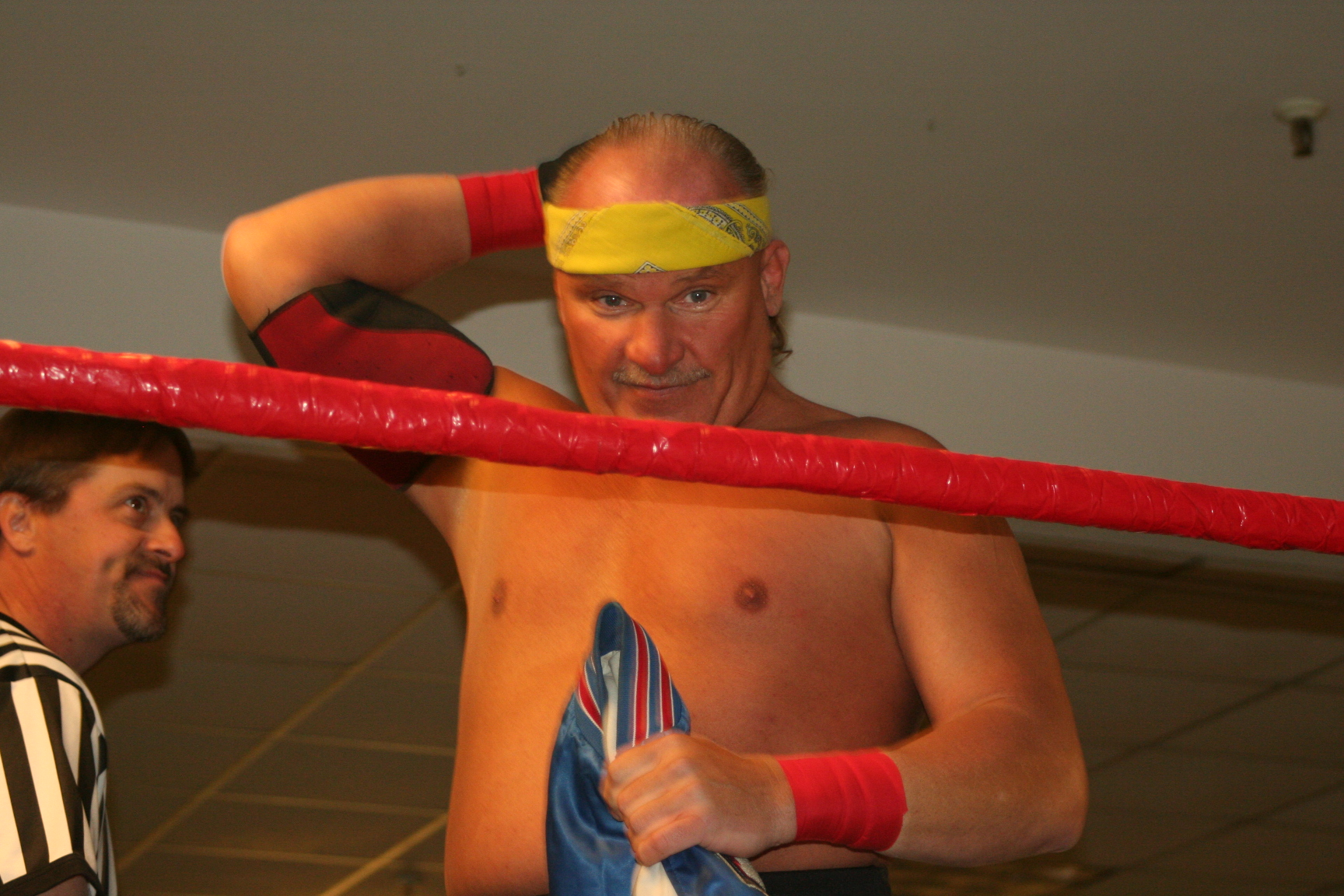
- South in 2011

Personal information
- Born: September 7, 1962 (age 64) Charlotte, North Carolina, U.S.
- Website: www.GeorgeSouth.com

Professional wrestling career
- Ring name(s): Cruel Connection #2; George South; Gladiator #2; Mr. Florida; Mr. No. 1
- Billed height: 6 ft 2 in (1.88 m)
- Billed weight: 235 lb (107 kg; 16.8 st)
- Trained by: Rusty Roberts
- Debut: December 11, 1982

George South (born September 7, 1962) is an American professional wrestler. In the course of his career, South has wrestled for professional wrestling promotions such as Jim Crockett Promotions, the National Wrestling Alliance, Smoky Mountain Wrestling, Juggalo Championship Wrestling, World Championship Wrestling and the World Wrestling Federation.

== Professional wrestling career ==
=== Early career (1984–1985) ===
South began wrestling in 1984, having his first match on December 26, 1984, in Championship Wrestling from Florida. Teaming with Mike Allen at a CWF TV taping, the rookie lost to the Pretty Young Things (Koko B. Ware and Norvell Austin). South next appeared in Mid South Wrestling, teaming with Rocky King to take on Kamala in a two-on-one match on January 2, 1985, in Shreveport, Louisiana.

=== National Wrestling Alliance (1985–1989) ===
South next appeared in the NWA's Jim Crockett Promotions (JCP). South made his debut on the April 6, 1985, edition of World Championship Wrestling, the inaugural broadcast of the show after Jim Crockett acquired the TBS time slot. That night a young South teamed with Greg Stone to face Ivan Koloff & Krusher Kruschev (Barry Darsow). A week later he had his first singles match, losing to Magnum T. A. on the Saturday night program. On June 1, 1985, he received his first ever match (non-title) with then NWA World Heavyweight Champion Ric Flair. He would become Ric Flair's favorite journeyman to wrestle as Flair considered him a great worker. South was used as enhancement talent but he always got in some offense and was very good at getting heel heat with the fans. He did however gain his first victory September 14, 1985, when he defeated Mack Jeffers in Columbus, Georgia.

While still frequently wrestling for Crockett, South also wrestled in Georgia Championship Wrestling and captured his NWA Georgia Junior Heavyweight Championship in 1986 in between stops for JCP. South also made appearances in NWA affiliate Central States Wrestling in the fall of 1986. In his first match there, he defeated Colt Steel on October 26 in Kansas City, Missouri, followed up by a win two days later against Mark Fleming. After a loss to Steel on November 21, 1986, South ended his run in CSW with another win over him on November 27, 1986, in Kansas City, Kansas. He then returned to Mid Atlantic Wrestling, where he began to frequently team with Gary Royal in the masked jobber tag teams the Cruel Connection, Mexican Twin Devils and the Gladiators. As the Gladiators, South and Royal jobbed for Bill and Randy Mulkey giving the perennial jobber tag team their only televised win on World Championship Wrestling.

In the first round of the 1987 Jim Crockett Sr. Memorial Cup, South teamed with Steve Keirn and wrestled Mike Graham and Nelson Royal to a draw. Throughout the year he continued to team with Royal – usually as the Gladiators – and gained occasional victories in singles competition. In 1988 they were redubbed The Cruel Connection, and on April 22 entered the 1988 Jim Crockett Sr. Memorial Cup but lost to The Sheepherders in the first round.

=== World Wrestling Federation (1988–1990) ===
While still wrestling for Jim Crockett Promotions, South made his first World Wrestling Federation appearance on August 2, 1988, at a TV taping for WWF Wrestling Challenge, losing to The Honky Tonk Man in a non-title match. On the August 24, 1988, taping of Challenge, South wrestled the Blue Blazer, the match being the masked Owen Hart's first televised WWF match. South would have matches with a wide array of WWF performers, including Brutus Beefcake, Hercules, Hillbilly Jim, Jake "the Snake" Roberts, Jim Duggan, Jimmy Snuka, Rhythm and Blues, Sam Houston, the Brain Busters, The British Bulldogs, The Rockers, and Ultimate Warrior. On August 2, 1989, he was defeated by Al Perez in the latter's debut match at a WWF Superstars of Wrestling taping in Wheeling, WV. His final appearance came on the January 20, 1990, episode of WWF Superstars where he teamed with Alan Martin in a losing effort to Demolition.

=== World Championship Wrestling (1989–1995) ===
During the fall of 1988, Jim Crockett Promotions was acquired by Ted Turner and ultimately rebranded World Championship Wrestling; during this time South continued as a regular. On April 1, 1989, South would lose to The Great Muta's WCW debut, and then enter a house show series with him that month.

Two months later, he became part of wrestling history on Clash of the Champions VII. Teaming with Cougar Jay, he faced off against The Ding Dongs on June 14, 1989, in a match held in a sweltering Fort Bragg, North Carolina. Although new WCW Vice President Jim Herd was expecting a strong reaction for his new tag-team, the crowd turned virulently against them. While each Ding Dong took turns ringing a giant bell at ringside while the other wrestled, the crowd booed and announcer Jim Ross was noticeably embarrassed. South's opponents are now regarded as having one of the worst gimmicks of all time.

Gary Royal would depart WCW after 1989, leaving South to soldier on in singles matches wrestling under his own name or as "Cruel Connection #1". He faced a wave of incoming new talent, including Johnny B. Badd, Van Hammer, and Marcus Bagwell as the new decade progressed. After 1992 his appearances became infrequent. On August 20, 1993, when he teamed with The Italian Stallion to face The Cole Twins at a house show in Bluefield, West Virginia in what would be his only match of the year. In 1994 he returned for WCW Saturday Night matches against Alex Wright, Jim Duggan, and Dave Sullivan. In 1995 he would team with various opponents in matches against Stars & Stripes and The Nasty Boys. On May 27, 1995, just over ten years after joining the promotion he would have his last match when he teamed with Mike McKeefer in a WCW Saturday Night match that saw them defeated by The Nasty Boys.

=== Return to World Wrestling Federation (1993–1994, 1996) ===
South returned for one match at a television taping on March 7, 1993, and faced Tatanka in Fayetteville, North Carolina. However, in 1994 he would make numerous appearances, starting on January 17 edition of Monday Night Raw where he was defeated by Tatanka in Richmond, Virginia. On February 5, 1994, episode of WWF Superstars he wrestled Doink the Clown, and in April faced Lex Luger in a losing effort. As the year progressed, he would have matches with Sparky Plugg (Bob Holly) and The Bushwhackers.

George South made one more WWF appearance in 1996, wrestling Jake "The Snake" Roberts on the June 1 edition of WWF Superstars.

=== Pro Wrestling Federation (1991–1999) ===
While still making appearances in WCW, South joined the Pro Wrestling Federation, a new promotion that was promoted by The Italian Stallion, who promoted the company with some help from South. On June 15, 1991, he captured the PWF Junior Heavyweight Championship. He would hold this title for 460 days before finally losing it to Flaming Youth on September 17, 1992. South would become the top heel in the PWF, winning the Junior Heavyweight title on multiple occasions. He also reformed his Cruel Connection team with Gary Royal when his former partner joined the promotion.

South feuded with Flaming Youth and The Southern Rocker throughout 1993. On June 18, 1994, he teamed with the Italian Stallion and won the PWF Tag-Team Championship, defeating Austin Steele & Terry Austin. He would go on to win that title several times, but his greatest PWF achievement came on September 14, 1995, when he beat Star Ryder (Ray Hudson) to win the PWF Heavyweight Championship at an event in Charlotte, North Carolina. South would eventually have to vacate the title, and lost a tournament finale to crown a new champion October 21, 1995, to The Italian Stallion.

In 1996 he regained the PWF Heavyweight Championship and continued feud with the Stallion, as well as Carolina Dreamer. Stallion and South would trade the championship during 1996 and 1997.

=== Smoky Mountain Wrestling (1994–1995) ===
As South continued his reign as a top heel wrestler in the PWF, he also made a foray into Jim Cornette's Smoky Mountain Wrestling promotion in 1994. He made his debut on their October 15, 1994, television program, facing Tracy Smothers, then would wrestle Boo Bradley and Bruiser Bedlam later in the year. On January 2, 1995, he received a title shot against SMW TV Champion Buddy Landell in a "Beat The Champ" challenge but was unsuccessful. Later in the year he would face Al Snow, Unabom, and Bobby Blaze before leaving the promotion in April 1995.

=== Later career (2000–present) ===
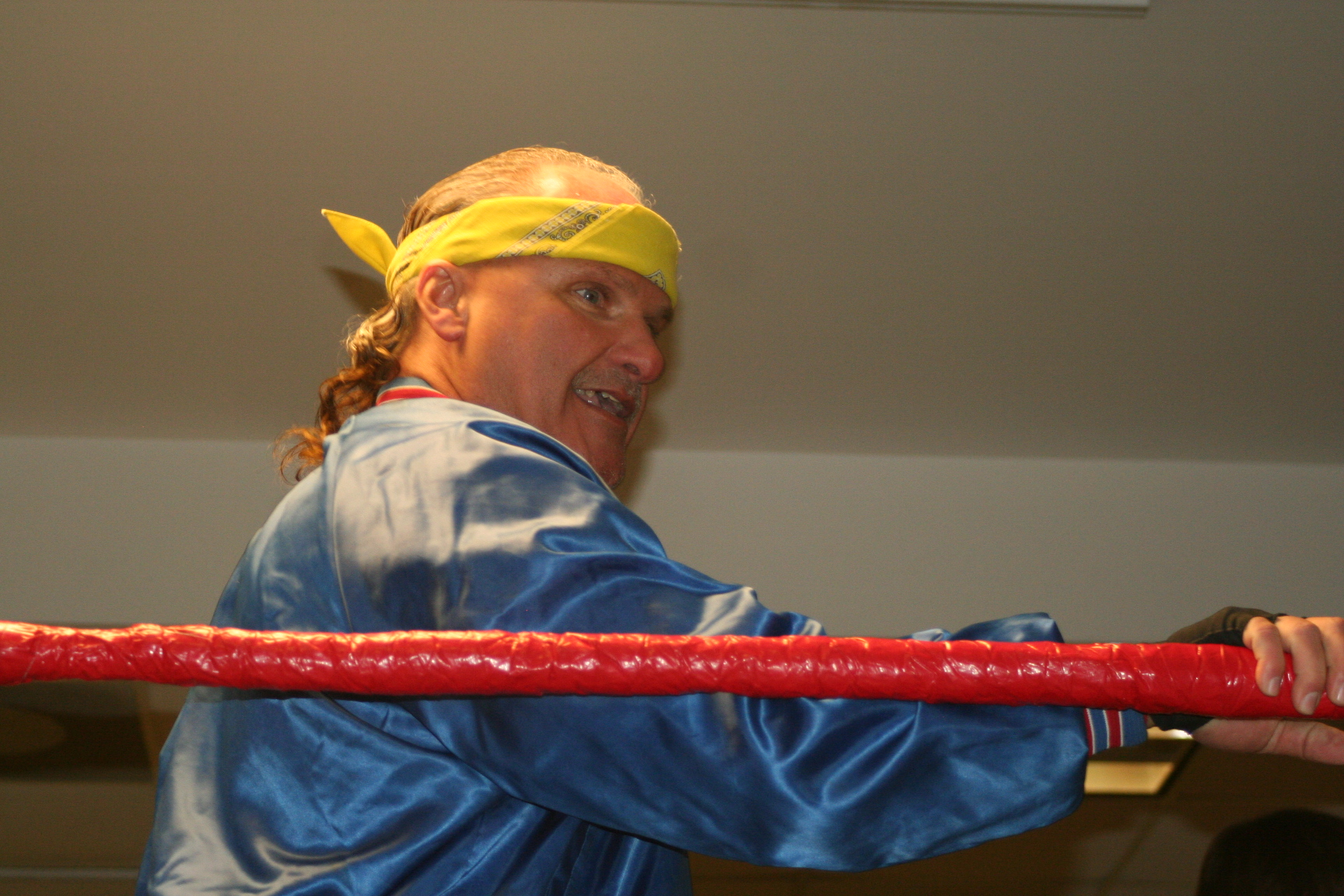
South in 2011

South is a born-again Christian and says one of his biggest thrills was passing a Christian tract to Hulk Hogan in WCW who told him he needed it. In 1999 three full-color cartoon tracts were produced for South entitled The Greatest Match Ever, Who is Your Tag-Team Partner?, and Who Are You Wrestling Against?, illustrated by comics artist Steven Butler, packaged by The Nate Butler Studio, and published by PowerMark Productions.

When the PWF closed in 1999, South opened his own promotion called the Exodus Wrestling Alliance. He still runs shows as of 2005 in the Mid-Atlantic area and participates in Christianity/wrestling shows with Nikita Koloff and Ted DiBiase.

One of his gimmicks is the fact that he gets heel heat from the fans by sticking his tongue out at them and taunting them about how he is manhandling their hero in the ring. He is proud of the fact that he does not have to get crude, use profanity, or become vulgar to get heel heat.

An important part of South's modern day matches are moves and performances intended to pay tribute to the great wrestling stars of the 1960s, 1970s, and 1980s, including Wahoo McDaniel, Blackjack Mulligan, Brute Bernard, Two Ton Harris, Paul Jones, Ricky Steamboat, Tully Blanchard, the Anderson Brothers, and others.

South's most significant recent match was against Brad Armstrong in Spartanburg, South Carolina, at the Wrestling Night of Legends II. In 2013, South participated in the Brad Armstrong Memorial Event, in a tag-team match alongside Bob Orton Jr. against Tim Horner and Tom Prichard. During the match, Orton and South didn't get along too well to the point South tried to sucker-punch Orton, Orton would later enter the ring and superplex South, letting Horner pin South while Orton was walking down the ramp.

In 2018 he teamed with Zane Dawson at the NCWA's 10th Annual Ivan Koloff Tag Team Tournament and captured the NCWA Tag-Team Championship when his team defeated Chet Sterling and Dave Dawson. Later that year South joined the America's Most Liked (AML) Wrestling promotion, and on November 25, 2018, he defeated Caleb Konley to win the AML Wrestling Championship. South made several successful title defenses in 2019, including beating Konley in a loser leaves AML match on January 27 and defeating Fallah Bahh. CW Anderson finally ended South's title reign on July 28, 2019, at an event in Winston-Salem, North Carolina. However, on December 1, 2019, he regained the Title from Anderson and remained AML Wrestling Champion before losing it back to Anderson.

Over thirty years after the NWA Jim Crockett Promotion was purchased by Turner Broadcasting, George South made his first appearance back in the National Wrestling Alliance when he wrestled Colby Corino in dark match at NWA Powerrr on December 15, 2019.

South trains up and comers at the Rings wrestling training facility in Charlotte, North Carolina on Tuesdays. His son, George South Jr., is also now a wrestler. South Jr. first wrestled on AEW Dark on December 1, 2020.

Still wrestles as of 2026.

== Books ==
- Dad, You Don't Work You Wrestle (autobiography) Amazon

== Championships and accomplishments ==
- Universal Championship Wrestling
  - UCW American Heavyweight Championship (1 time)
  - UCW King of The Cage Championship (1 time)
  - UCW Hardcore Championship (1 time)
- All-Star Wrestling Alliance (North Carolina)
  - ASWA WORLD Heavyweight Championship (4 times)
- North American Wrestling Alliance
  - NAWA Carolinas Championship (1 time)
- American Pro Wrestling
  - APW Television Championship (1 time)
  - APW United States Championship (1 time)
- Exodus Wrestling Alliance
  - EWA Heavyweight Championship (6 times)
  - EWA Television Championship (1 time)
- Independent Championship Wrestling
  - ICW Tag Team Championship (1 time) – with Marc Ash
- Jim Crockett Promotions
  - NWA Georgia Junior Heavyweight Championship (1 time)
- Mid-Atlantic Championship Wrestling
  - Anderson Brothers Classic Tag Team Tournament winner (2004) – with Brad Anderson
- Pro Wrestling Federation
  - PWF Heavyweight Championship (7 times)
  - PWF Junior Heavyweight Championship (3 times)
  - PWF Eastern States Heavyweight Championship (1 time)
  - PWF Tag Team Championship (5 times) – with The Rising Sun (1), Mean Mark (1), Terry Austin (1), The Italian Stallion (1) and The Equalizer (1)
- Pro Wrestling Illustrated
  - PWI ranked him # 248 of the top 500 wrestlers of the year in the PWI 500 in 1997.
- Southern Championship Wrestling
  - SCW Heavyweight Championship (3 times)
- North Carolina Wrestling Association
  - NCWA Tag Team Championship (1 time) – with Zane Dawson
- Trans South Wrestling
  - TSW Heavyweight Championship (1 time)
- America's Most Liked Wrestling
  - AML Championship (2 times)
  - AML Prestige Championship (1 time)
  - 2nd Annual Scott Eiland Memorial Rumble (2019)
- Real Action Wrestling
  - RAW Heavyweight Championship (1 time)
