= 1996 in professional wrestling =

1996 in professional wrestling describes the year's events in the world of professional wrestling.

== List of notable promotions ==
These promotions held notable events in 1996.

Promotion Name	Abbreviation	Notes
Catch Wrestling Association	CWA	
Consejo Mundial de Lucha Libre	CMLL	
Extreme Championship Wrestling	ECW	
Frontier Martial-Arts Wrestling	FMW	
Lucha Libre AAA Worldwide	AAA	The "AAA" abbreviation has been used since the mid-1990s and had previously stood for the promotion's original name Asistencia Asesoría y Administración.
New Japan Pro-Wrestling	NJPW	
World Championship Wrestling	WCW	
World Wrestling Council	WWC	
World Wrestling Federation	WWF	

== Calendar of notable shows ==
=== January ===
Date	Promotion(s)	Event	Location	Main Event
January 4	NJPW	Wrestling World 1996	Tokyo, Japan	Nobuhiko Takada defeated Keiji Mutoh (c) in a Singles match for the IWGP Heavyweight Championship
January 5	ECW	House Party	Philadelphia, Pennsylvania, United States	The Public Enemy (Johnny Grunge and Rocco Rock) defeated The Gangstas (Mustafa Saed and New Jack) in a tag team street fight
January 21	WWF	Royal Rumble	Fresno, California, United States	The Undertaker defeated Bret Hart (c) by disqualification in a Singles match for the WWF Championship
January 23	WCW	Clash of the Champions XXXII	Paradise, Nevada, United States	Ric Flair and The Giant defeated Hulk Hogan and Randy Savage in a tag team match
(c) – denotes defending champion(s)

=== February ===
Date	Promotion(s)	Event	Location	Main Event
February 3	ECW	Big Apple Blizzard Blast	Queens, New York, United States	2 Cold Scorpio and the Sandman defeated the Gangstas (Mustafa and New Jack) by pinfall in a tag team match
February 3	N/A	First Annual Eddie Gilbert Memorial Show	Cherry Hill, New Jersey, United States	Dan Severn (c) defeated Al Snow in a Singles match for the NWA World Heavyweight Championship
February 11	WCW	SuperBrawl VI	St. Petersburg, Florida, United States	Hulk Hogan defeated The Giant in a Steel Cage match
February 17	ECW	CyberSlam	Philadelphia, Pennsylvania, United States	Raven (c) defeated The Sandman in a Singles match for the ECW World Heavyweight Championship
February 18	WWF	In Your House 6	Louisville, Kentucky, United States	Bret Hart (c) defeated Diesel by escaping the cage in a Steel Cage match for the WWF World Heavyweight Championship
February 23-March 1	CMLL	La Copa Junior Tournament	Mexico City, Mexico	La Fiera defeated Scorpió Jr. in a 1996 La Copa Junior first round match
February 23	ECW	Just Another Night	Glenolden, Pennsylvania, United States	Raven (c) defeated Shane Douglas by pinfall in a Singles match for the ECW World Heavyweight Championship
(c) – denotes defending champion(s)

=== March ===
Date	Promotion(s)	Event	Location	Main Event
March 8	ECW	Big Ass Extreme Bash	Queens, New York, United States	Night 1: Raven (c) defeated The Sandman by pinfall in a Singles match for the ECW World Heavyweight Championship; Night 2: The Gangstas (Mustafa and New Jack) defeated The Headhunters (Headhunter A and Headhunter B) and 2 Cold Scorpio and the Sandman by pinfall in a three-way tag team elimination match
March 22	CMLL	Homenaje a Salvador Lutteroth	Mexico City, Mexico	Rambo defeated El Brazo in a Best two-out-of-three falls Lucha de Apuestas, Hair vs. Hair match
March 24	WCW	Uncensored	Tupelo, Mississippi, United States	Hulk Hogan and Randy Savage defeated Ric Flair, Arn Anderson, Meng, The Barbarian, Lex Luger, The Taskmaster, Z-Gangsta and The Ultimate Solution via Pinfall in a Doomsday Cage match
March 31	WWF	WrestleMania XII	Anaheim, California, United States	Shawn Michaels defeated Bret Hart (c) 1–0 in sudden death overtime in a 60-minute Iron Man match for the WWF Championship
(c) – denotes defending champion(s)

=== April ===
Date	Promotion(s)	Event	Location	Main Event
April 4	FMW	Yamato Nadeshiko III	Osaka, Japan	Chigusa Nagayo and Combat Toyoda defeated KAORU and Megumi Kudo in a tag team match
April 13	ECW	Massacre On Queens Boulevard	Queens, New York, United States	The Gangstas (Mustafa and New Jack) defeated the Headhunters (Headhunter A and Headhunter B) and 2 Cold Scorpio and The Sandman by pinfall in a Three-way tag team elimination match for the number one contendership to the ECW World Tag Team Championship
April 19	CMLL	40. Aniversario de Arena México	Mexico City, Mexico	Rayo de Jalisco Jr., Mil Máscaras and Tinieblas defeated Dr. Wagner Jr., Canek and Emilio Charles Jr. in a Six-man "Lucha Libre rules" tag team match
April 20	ECW	Hostile City Showdown	Philadelphia, Pennsylvania, United States	Raven (c) defeated Shane Douglas in a Singles match for the ECW World Heavyweight Championship
April 28	WWF	In Your House 7: Good Friends, Better Enemies	Omaha, Nebraska, United States	Shawn Michaels (c) defeated Diesel in a No Holds Barred match for the WWF Championship
April 29	NJPW	Battle Formation	Tokyo, Japan	Shinya Hashimoto defeated Nobuhiko Takada (c) in a Singles match for the IWGP Heavyweight Championship
(c) – denotes defending champion(s)

=== May ===
Date	Promotion(s)	Event	Location	Main Event
May 5	FMW	FMW 7th Anniversary Show	Kawasaki, Kanagawa, Japan	Mr. Pogo and Terry Funk defeated Hayabusa and Masato Tanaka in a One Million Yen No Ropes Exploding Barbed Wire Double Hell Exploding Deathmatch
May 11	AAA	Triplemanía IV-A	Chicago, Illinois, United States	Konnan and Perro Aguayo defeated Pierroth Jr. and Cien Caras in a Lumberjack match
May 11	ECW	A Matter of Respect	Philadelphia, Pennsylvania, United States	Tommy Dreamer and the Gangstas (Mustafa and New Jack) defeated Brian Lee and The Eliminators (John Kronus and Perry Saturn) by pinfall in a Six-man tag team match
May 19	WCW	Slamboree	Baton Rouge, Louisiana, United States	The Giant (c) defeated Sting in a Singles match for the WCW World Heavyweight Championship
May 26; May 28	WWF	In Your House 8: Beware of Dog	Florence, South Carolina, United States; North Charleston, South Carolina, United States	May 26: Shawn Michaels (c) vs. The British Bulldog ended in a no contest in a Singles match for the WWF Championship; May 28: Goldust (c) defeated The Undertaker in a Casket match for the WWF Intercontinental Championship
(c) – denotes defending champion(s)

=== June ===
Date	Promotion(s)	Event	Location	Main Event
June 1	NJPW; CMLL; NWA; WCW; Michinoku Pro; AAA; AJWW	World Wrestling Peace Festival	Los Angeles, California, United States	Antonio Inoki (NJPW) and Dan Severn (NWA) defeated Yoshiaki Fujiwara and Oleg Taktarov in a tag team match
June 1	ECW	Fight the Power	Philadelphia, Pennsylvania, United States	The Eliminators (John Kronus and Perry Saturn) (c) defeated the Gangstas (Mustafa and New Jack) by pinfall in a tag team match for the ECW World Tag Team Championship
June 7	N/A	First Annual Ilio DiPaolo Memorial Show	Buffalo, New York, United States	The Giant (c) defeated Sting by disqualification in a Singles match for the WCW World Heavyweight Championship
June 7	CMLL	Torneo Gran Alternativa	Mexico City, Mexico	Chicago Express and Bestia Salvaje defeated Atlantico and Atlantis in a tournament final match
June 15	AAA	Triplemanía IV-B	Orizaba, Veracruz, Mexico	La Parka, Octagón, and Máscara Sagrada defeated Killer, Cien Caras, and Heavy Metal in a Lumberjack match
June 16	WCW	The Great American Bash	Baltimore, Maryland, United States	The Giant (c) defeated Lex Luger in a Singles match for the WCW World Heavyweight Championship
June 22	ECW	Hardcore Heaven	Philadelphia, Pennsylvania, United States	Sabu defeated Rob Van Dam in a Singles match
June 23	WWF	King of the Ring	Milwaukee, Wisconsin, United States	Shawn Michaels (c) defeated The British Bulldog in a Singles match for the WWF Championship with Mr. Perfect as special outside enforcer
June 30	N/A	First Annual Rikidozan Memorial Show	Yokohama, Japan	Genichiro Tenryu and Tatsumi Fujinami defeated Koki Kitihara and Riki Choshu when Tenryu pinned Kitihara in a tag team match
(c) – denotes defending champion(s)

=== July ===
Date	Promotion(s)	Event	Location	Main Event
July 5	CMLL	International Gran Prix	Mexico City, Mexico	El Hijo del Santo defeated The Great Sasuke in a 1996 International Gran Prix final match
July 6	CWA	Euro Catch Festival in Graz	Graz, Austria	Ludvig Borga (c) defeated August Smisl in Round 6 in a Singles match for the CWA World Heavyweight Championship
July 7	WCW	Bash at the Beach	Daytona Beach, Florida, United States	The Outsiders (Kevin Nash and Scott Hall) and Hulk Hogan fought Randy Savage, Sting and Lex Luger to a no contest in a Six-man tag team match
July 13	ECW	Heat Wave	Philadelphia, Pennsylvania, United States	The Sandman, Terry Gordy and Tommy Dreamer defeated Raven (c), Brian Lee and Stevie Richards in a Steel cage match for the ECW World Heavyweight Championship
July 14	WWC	WWC 23rd Aniversario	Caguas, Puerto Rico	Invader #2 and #3 defeated The Southern Posse (Rick Thames and Sonny Trout) by disqualification in a reverse decision in a tag team match
July 15	AAA	Triplemanía IV-C	Madero, Tamaulipas, Mexico	Halcón Dorado Jr. lost to Karis la Momia; Also in the match: Los Payasos (Coco Rojo, Coco Verde and Coco Amarillo) and Los Junior Atómicos (Máscara Sagrada Jr., Tinieblas Jr. and Blue Demon Jr.)
July 21	WWF	In Your House 9: International Incident	Vancouver, British Columbia, Canada	Camp Cornette (The British Bulldog, Owen Hart and Vader) defeated The People's Posse (Ahmed Johnson, Shawn Michaels and Sycho Sid) in a Six-man tag team match
(c) – denotes defending champion(s)

=== August ===
Date	Promotion(s)	Event	Location	Main Event
August 1	FMW	Summer Spectacular	Tokyo, Japan	Terry Funk defeated Mr. Pogo via knockout in a No Ropes Exploding Barbed Wire Glass Crush Spider Net Double Hell Deathmatch
August 3	ECW	The Doctor Is In	Philadelphia, Pennsylvania, United States	Sabu defeated Rob Van Dam in a Stretcher match
August 6	NJPW	G1 Climax	Tokyo, Japan	Riki Choshu defeated Masahiro Chono in the finals
August 10	WCW	WCW Hog Wild	Sturgis, South Dakota, United States	Hollywood Hogan defeated The Giant (c) in a Singles match for the WCW World Heavyweight Championship
August 15	WCW	Clash of the Champions XXXIII	Denver, Colorado, United States	Ric Flair defeated Hollywood Hogan (c) by disqualification in a Singles match for the WCW World Heavyweight Championship
August 18	WWF	SummerSlam	Cleveland, Ohio, United States	Shawn Michaels (c) defeated Vader in a Singles match for the WWF World Heavyweight Championship
August 23	ECW	Requiem for a Pitbull	Reading, Pennsylvania, United States	Rob Van Dam defeated Tommy Dreamer by pinfall in a Singles match
August 24	ECW	Natural Born Killaz	Philadelphia, Pennsylvania, United States	The Gangstas (Mustafa and New Jack) (c) defeated the Eliminators (John Kronus and Perry Saturn) by pinfall in a Steel cage weapons match for the ECW World Tag Team Championship
August 24	WWF	Xperience	Toronto, Ontario, Canada	Shawn Michaels (c) defeated Goldust in a Ladder match for the WWF World Heavyweight Championship
(c) – denotes defending champion(s)

=== September ===
Date	Promotion(s)	Event	Location	Main Event
September 13	ECW	Unlucky Lottery	Jim Thorpe, Pennsylvania, United States	Sabu defeated Rob Van Dam by pinfall in a Singles match
September 14	ECW	When Worlds Collide	Philadelphia, Pennsylvania, United States	Brian Lee and the Eliminators (John Kronus and Perry Saturn) defeated the Miracle Violence Connection (Steve Williams and Terry Gordy) and Tommy Dreamer by pinfall in a Six-man tag team match
September 15	WCW	Fall Brawl	Winston-Salem, North Carolina, United States	nWo (Hollywood Hogan, Scott Hall, Kevin Nash and nWo Sting) defeated Team WCW (Lex Luger, Ric Flair, Arn Anderson and Sting) in a WarGames match
September 20; September 27	CMLL	CMLL 63rd Anniversary Show	Mexico City, Mexico	September 20: Rayo de Jalisco Jr. (c) defeated Gran Markus Jr. in a Best two-out-of-three falls match for the CMLL World Heavyweight Championship; September 27: Emilio Charles Jr. defeated Silver King in a Best two-out-of-three falls Lucha de Apuestas hair vs. hair match
September 22	WWF	In Your House 10: Mind Games	Philadelphia, Pennsylvania, United States	Shawn Michaels (c) defeated Mankind by disqualification in a Singles match for the WWF World Heavyweight Championship
(c) – denotes defending champion(s)

=== October ===
Date	Promotion(s)	Event	Location	Main Event
October 5	ECW	Ultimate Jeopardy	Philadelphia, Pennsylvania, United States	The Sandman and Tommy Dreamer defeated Stevie Richards and Brian Lee by pinfall in an "Ultimate Jeopardy" tag team match for the ECW World Heavyweight Championship
October 20	WWF	In Your House 11: Buried Alive	Indianapolis, Indiana, United States	The Undertaker defeated Mankind in a Buried Alive match
October 26	ECW	High Incident	Philadelphia, Pennsylvania, United States	Tommy Dreamer defeated Brian Lee in a Scaffold match
October 27	WCW	Halloween Havoc	Paradise, Nevada, United States	Hollywood Hogan (c) defeated Randy Savage in a Singles match for the WCW World Heavyweight Championship
(c) – denotes defending champion(s)

=== November ===
Date	Promotion(s)	Event	Location	Main Event
November 15	CMLL	Torneo Gran Alternativa	Mexico City, Mexico	Rey Bucanero and Emilio Charles Jr. defeated Héctor Garza and Mr. Niebla in a tournament final match
November 16	ECW	November to Remember	Philadelphia, Pennsylvania, United States	Terry Funk and Tommy Dreamer defeated Shane Douglas and Brian Lee in a tag team match
November 17	WWF	Survivor Series	New York, New York, United States	Sycho Sid defeated Shawn Michaels (c) in a Singles match for the WWF Championship
November 24	WCW	World War 3	Norfolk, Virginia, United States	The Giant won by last eliminating Lex Luger in 60-Man World War 3 battle royal for a future WCW World Heavyweight Championship match
(c) – denotes defending champion(s)

=== December ===
Date	Promotion(s)	Event	Location	Main Event
December 7	ECW	Holiday Hell	Philadelphia, Pennsylvania, United States	Raven defeated The Sandman (c) by pinfall in a Barbed wire match for the ECW World Heavyweight Championship
December 11	FMW	Year End Spectacular	Tokyo, Japan	Atsushi Onita, Mr. Pogo, Masato Tanaka and Tetsuhiro Kuroda defeated Funk Masters of Wrestling (Terry Funk, Hisakatsu Oya, Headhunter A and Headhunter B) in a Texas Tornado Street Fight Deathmatch
December 15	WWF	In Your House 12: It's Time	West Palm Beach, Florida, United States	Sycho Sid (c) defeated Bret Hart in a Singles match for the WWF World Heavyweight Championship
December 21	CWA	Euro Catch Festival in Bremen	Bremen, Germany	Rambo defeated Ludvig Borga (c) in Round 12 in a Singles match for the CWA World Heavyweight Championship
December 29	WCW	Starrcade	Nashville, Tennessee, United States	Roddy Piper defeated Hollywood Hogan by submission in a Singles match
(c) – denotes defending champion(s)

== Notable events ==
=== Mass Transit Incident ===
The "Mass Transit incident" was an infamous event in professional wrestling that occurred at an Extreme Championship Wrestling (ECW) house show on November 23, 1996 at the Wonderland Ballroom in Revere, Massachusetts in the United States. It involved Eric Kulas (1979 – May 12, 2002), an aspiring professional wrestler using the ring name "Mass Transit", being bladed too deeply by New Jack of The Gangstas during a tag-team match. Two of Kulas' arteries were severed; he bled profusely and passed out, and needed to be escorted out of the arena with medical attention. Further controversy arose when it came to light that Kulas had lied to ECW owner and booker Paul Heyman about his age and professional wrestling training. The incident led to a future ECW pay-per-view being cancelled (until Heyman negotiated otherwise), a lawsuit from Kulas' family, and went down as one of the most notorious moments of lore in professional wrestling history.

=== IWRG created ===
On January 1 – Mexican promoter Adolfo Moreno created the International Wrestling Revolution Group (IWRG) which held its debut show on this date in Arena Naucalpan.

=== Formation of the nWo ===
In the main event of World Championship Wrestling (WCW)'s Bash at the Beach pay-per-view on July 7, Scott Hall and Kevin Nash (both of whom had recently defected to WCW from the World Wrestling Federation (WWF) and been presented on-screen as "outsiders") indicated that they would enlist a mystery partner against the team of Randy Savage, Sting, and Lex Luger.

Their partner ended up being Hulk Hogan, who surprisingly attacked long-time Mega Powers partner Savage to conclude the match, thus turning heel for the first time in nearly two decades. In his post-match promo, Hogan indicated his decision to lead the villainous stable which he christened as the New World Order (nWo).

The nWo would be the main focus of WCW programming for the better part of the next three years and led to WCW Monday Nitro defeating WWF Monday Night Raw in the Monday Night War ratings battle for eighty-three consecutive weeks. These developments in WCW are often credited with ultimately pushing the WWF toward producing the "edgier" content which would become the hallmark of the Attitude Era.

== Accomplishments and tournaments ==
=== AJW ===
Accomplishment	Winner	Date won	Notes
Japan Grand Prix 1996	Aja Kong	August 30	
Rookie of the Year Decision Tournament	Momoe Nakanishi		
Tag League The Best 1996	Manami Toyota and Rie Tamada	December 1	

=== AJPW ===
Accomplishment	Winner	Date won	Notes
Asunaro Cup 1996	Tamon Honda	January 28	
Champion Carnival 1996	Akira Taue	January 20	
World's Strongest Determination League 1996	Toshiaki Kawada and Akira Taue	December 6	

=== Jd' Star ===
Accomplishment	Winner	Date won	Notes
Rookies Tournament	Yoko Takahashi	December 29	

=== WCW ===
Accomplishment	Winner	Date won	Notes
Lord Of The Ring Tournament	Diamond Dallas Page	May 19	
World War 3	The Giant	November 24	
WCW United States Championship Tournament	Eddie Guerrero	December 29	
WCW Women's Championship Tournament	Akira Hokuto	December 29	

=== WWF ===
Accomplishment	Winner	Date won	Notes
Royal Rumble	Shawn Michaels	January 21	
WWF Tag Team Championship Tournament	The Bodydonnas (Skip and Zip)	March 31	
Kuwait Cup	Ahmed Johnson	May 12	
King of the Ring	Stone Cold Steve Austin	June 23	
WWF Intercontinental Championship Tournament	Marc Mero	September 23	
Middle East Cup	Bret Hart	December 2	

==== WWF Hall of Fame ====
Category	Inductee	Inducted by
Individual	"Baron" Mikel Scicluna	Gorilla Monsoon
Individual	"Captain" Lou Albano	Joe Franklin
Individual	Jimmy "Superfly" Snuka	Don Muraco
Individual	Johnny Rodz	Arnold Skaaland
Individual	Killer Kowalski	Hunter Hearst Helmsley
Individual	Pat Patterson	Bret Hart
Individual	Vincent J. McMahon	Shane McMahon
Group	The Valiant Brothers	Tony Garea

==== Slammy Awards ====
Poll	Results
Best Buns	Sunny
Best Slammin' Jammin' Entrance	Shawn Michaels
"Put A Fork in Him, He's Done" (Best Finisher)	Bret Hart – Sharpshooter
Crime of the Century	Vader's assault on WWF President Gorilla Monsoon
New Sensation of the Squared Circle	Ahmed Johnson
I'm Talking and I Can't Shut Up for Biggest Mouth	Jerry Lawler
Best Threads	Shawn Michaels
Blue Light Special for Worst Dresser	Jim Cornette
WWF's Greatest Hit	The Undertaker drags Diesel into the abyss
Minds Behind the Mayhem for Manager of the Year	Sunny
Lifetime Achievement Award	Freddie Blassie
Most Embarrassing Moment	Jerry Lawler kisses his own foot
Squared Circle Shocker	Shawn Michaels collapses (Owen Hart accepts the award for making Shawn collapse)
Master of Mat Mechanics	Shawn Michaels
Best Music Video	Bret Hart
US West Match of the Year	Shawn Michaels vs. Razor Ramon in a ladder match from SummerSlam '95
Which WWF World Heavyweight Champion, past or present, in attendance, is Hall of Fame bound?	Bret Hart
Leader of the New Generation	Shawn Michaels

== Awards and honors ==
=== Pro Wrestling Illustrated ===
Category	Winner
PWI Wrestler of the Year	The Giant
PWI Tag Team of the Year	Harlem Heat (Booker T and Stevie Ray)
PWI Match of the Year	Bret Hart vs. Shawn Michaels (WrestleMania XII)
PWI Feud of the Year	Eric Bischoff vs. Vince McMahon
PWI Most Popular Wrestler of the Year	Shawn Michaels
PWI Most Hated Wrestler of the Year	Hollywood Hogan
PWI Comeback of the Year	Sycho Sid
PWI Most Improved Wrestler of the Year	Ahmed Johnson
PWI Most Inspirational Wrestler of the Year	Jake Roberts
PWI Rookie of the Year	The Giant
PWI Lifetime Achievement	Danny Hodge
PWI Editor's Award	Sunny

=== Wrestling Observer Newsletter ===
==== Wrestling Observer Newsletter Hall of Fame ====
Category	Inductee
Individual	Abdullah the Butcher
Individual	Perro Aguayo
Individual	André the Giant
Individual	Bert Assirati
Individual	Giant Baba
Individual	Jim Barnett
Individual	Red Berry
Individual	The Destroyer
Individual	Freddie Blassie
Individual	Blue Demon
Individual	Nick Bockwinkel
Individual	Paul Boesch
Individual	Bobo Brazil
Individual	Jack Brisco
Individual	Bruiser Brody
Individual	Mildred Burke
Individual	El Canek
Individual	Negro Casas
Individual	Riki Choshu
Individual	Jim Cornette
Individual	The Crusher
Individual	Ted DiBiase
Individual	Dick the Bruiser
Individual	Alfonso Dantés
Individual	Dynamite Kid
Individual	Jackie Fargo
Individual	Ric Flair
Individual	Tatsumi Fujinami
Individual	Dory Funk
Individual	Dory Funk, Jr.
Individual	Terry Funk
Individual	Verne Gagne
Individual	Cavernario Galindo
Individual	Ed Don George
Individual	Gorgeous George
Individual	Frank Gotch
Individual	Karl Gotch
Individual	Billy Graham
Individual	Eddie Graham
Individual	René Guajardo
Individual	Gory Guerrero
Individual	Georg Hackenschmidt
Individual	Stan Hansen
Individual	Bret Hart
Individual	Stu Hart
Individual	Bobby Heenan
Individual	Danny Hodge
Individual	Hulk Hogan
Individual	Antonio Inoki
Individual	Rayo de Jalisco, Sr.
Individual	Tom Jenkins
Individual	Don Leo Jonathan
Individual	Gene Kiniski
Individual	Fred Kohler
Individual	Killer Kowalski
Individual	Ernie Ladd
Individual	Dick Lane
Individual	Jerry Lawler
Individual	Ed Lewis
Individual	Jim Londos
Individual	Salvador Lutteroth
Individual	Akira Maeda
Individual	Devil Masami
Individual	Mil Máscaras
Individual	Dump Matsumoto
Individual	Earl McCready
Individual	Leroy McGuirk
Individual	Vincent J. McMahon
Individual	Vincent K. McMahon
Individual	Danny McShain
Individual	Ray Mendoza
Individual	Toots Mondt
Individual	Sam Muchnick
Individual	Bronko Nagurski
Individual	Pat O'Connor
Individual	Kintarō Ōki
Individual	Atsushi Onita
Individual	Pat Patterson
Individual	Antonio Peña
Individual	John Pesek
Individual	Roddy Piper
Individual	Harley Race
Individual	Dusty Rhodes
Individual	Rikidōzan
Individual	Yvon Robert
Individual	Billy Robinson
Individual	Antonino Rocca
Individual	Buddy Rogers
Individual	Lance Russell
Individual	Bruno Sammartino
Individual	Billy Sandow
Individual	El Santo
Individual	Jackie Sato
Individual	Randy Savage
Individual	The Sheik
Individual	Hisashi Shinma
Individual	Dara Singh
Individual	Gordon Solie
Individual	El Solitario
Individual	Ricky Steamboat
Individual	Joe Stecher
Individual	Tony Stecher
Individual	Ray Steele
Individual	Ray Stevens
Individual	Nobuhiko Takada
Individual	Genichiro Tenryu
Individual	Lou Thesz
Individual	Satoru Sayama
Individual	Jumbo Tsuruta
Individual	Frank Tunney
Individual	Maurice Vachon
Individual	Big Van Vader
Individual	Johnny Valentine
Individual	Fritz Von Erich
Individual	Whipper Billy Watson
Individual	Bill Watts
Individual	Jaguar Yokota
Individual	Stanislaus Zbyszko
Group	The Dusek family
Group	The Fabulous Kangaroos (Al Costello, Roy Heffernan, and Don Kent)
Group	The Road Warriors (Hawk and Animal)

==== Wrestling Observer Newsletter awards ====
Category	Winner
Wrestler of the Year	Kenta Kobashi
Most Outstanding	Rey Misterio Jr.
Feud of the Year	New World Order vs. World Championship Wrestling
Tag Team of the Year	Mitsuharu Misawa and Jun Akiyama
Most Improved	Diamond Dallas Page
Best on Interviews	Stone Cold Steve Austin

== Title changes ==
=== ECW ===
ECW World Heavyweight Championship
Incoming champion – The Sandman
Date	Winner	Event/Show	Note(s)
January 27	Raven	Live event	
October 5	The Sandman	Ultimate Jeopardy	
December 7	Raven	Holiday Hell	

ECW World Television Championship
Incoming champion – Mikey Whipwreck
Date	Winner	Event/Show	Note(s)
January 5	2 Cold Scorpio	House Party	
May 11	Shane Douglas	A Matter of Respect	
June 1	Pitbull #2	Fight the Power	
June 22	Chris Jericho	Hardcore Heaven	
July 13	Shane Douglas	Heat Wave	

ECW World Tag Team Championship
Incoming champions – Cactus Jack and Mikey Whipwreck
Date	Winner	Event/Show	Note(s)
February 3	The Eliminators (Kronus and Saturn)	Big Apple Blizzard Blast	
August 3	The Gangstas (Mustafa and New Jack)	The Doctor Is In	
December 20	The Eliminators (Kronus and Saturn)	Hardcore TV	

=== FMW ===
FMW Double Championship
Incoming champion – The Gladiator
Date	Winner	Event/Show	Note(s)
January 5	Vacant	FMW	
February 23	Super Leather	FMW	
May 27	The Gladiator	FMW	

FMW Brass Knuckles Tag Team Championship
Incoming champions – Lethal Weapon (Hisakatsu Oya and Horace Boulder)
Date	Winner	Event/Show	Note(s)
January 5	The Faces of Dead (Super Leather and Jason the Terrible)	FMW	
March 30	The Headhunters (A and B)	FMW	

FMW Independent World Junior Heavyweight Championship
Incoming champion – Koji Nakagawa
Date	Winner	Event/Show	Note(s)
May 5	Taka Michinoku	7th Anniversary Show	

FMW Women's Championship
Incoming champion – Combat Toyoda
Date	Winner	Event/Show	Note(s)
May 5	Megumi Kudo	7th Anniversary Show	

FMW World Street Fight 6-Man Tag Team Championship
(Title created)
Date	Winner	Event/Show	Note(s)
May 5	Puerto Rican Army (Super Leather, Headhunter A and Headhunter B)	7th Anniversary Show	
June 28	Masato Tanaka, Koji Nakagawa and Tetsuhiro Kuroda	FMW	
November 16	Funk Masters of Wrestling (Hisakatsu Oya, Headhunter A and Headhunter B)	FMW	

=== IWRG ===
Distrito Federal Trios Championship
Incoming champions – Los Oficiales (Maniac Cop, Oficial and Virgilante)
Date	Winner	Event/Show	Note(s)
Uncertain	Los Super Payasos (Bruly, Circus and Rody)	IWRG Show	
December 14	Judo Suwa, Shiima Nobunaga and Sumo Fuji	IWRG Show	

=== NJPW ===
IWGP Heavyweight Championship
Incoming champion – Keiji Mutoh
Date	Winner	Event/Show	Note(s)
January 4	Nobuhiko Takada	Wrestling World 1996	
April 29	Shinya Hashimoto	Battle Formation	

IWGP Tag Team Championship
Incoming champions – Junji Hirata and Shinya Hashimoto
Date	Winner	Event/Show	Note(s)
June 12	Kazuo Yamazaki and Takashi Iizuka	Best of the Super Jr. III	
July 16	Cho-Ten (Hiroyoshi Tenzan and Masahiro Chono)	Summer Struggle 1996	

IWGP Junior Heavyweight Championship
Incoming champion – Koji Kanemoto
Date	Winner	Event/Show	Note(s)
January 4	Jushin Thunder Liger	Wrestling World 1996	
April 29	The Great Sasuke	Battle Formation	
October 11	Ultimo Dragon	Live event	

=== WCW ===
WCW World Heavyweight Championship
Incoming champion – Ric Flair
Date	Winner	Event/Show	Note(s)
January 22	Randy Savage	Nitro	
February 11	Ric Flair	SuperBrawl VI	
April 22	The Giant	Nitro	
August 10	Hollywood Hogan	Hog Wild	

WCW Cruiserweight Championship
(Title created)
Date	Winner	Event/Show	Note(s)
March 20	Shinjiro Otani	Hyper Battle 1996	Defeated Wild Pegasus in tournament final to determine the new WCW Cruiserweight Champion. This was a New Japan Pro-Wrestling event.
May 2	Dean Malenko	WorldWide	
July 8	Rey Misterio, Jr.	Nitro	
October 27	Dean Malenko	Halloween Havoc	
December 29	Ultimate Dragon	Starrcade	

WCW United States Heavyweight Championship
Incoming champion – One Man Gang
Date	Winner	Event/Show	Note(s)
January 29	Konnan	Nitro	
July 7	Ric Flair	Bash at the Beach	
November 25	Vacant	Nitro	Vacated due to Ric Flair suffering a shoulder injury
December 29	Eddie Guerrero	Starrcade	Defeated Diamond Dallas Page in a tournament final

WCW Women's Championship
(Title created)
Date	Winner	Event/Show	Note(s)
December 29	Akira Hokuto	Starrcade	Defeated Madusa in a tournament final to become inaugural champion

WCW World Television Championship
Incoming champion – Johnny B. Badd
Date	Winner	Event/Show	Note(s)
February 17	Lex Luger	House show	
February 18	Johnny B. Badd	House show	
March 6	Lex Luger	Saturday Night	
August 20	Lord Steven Regal	Saturday Night	

WCW World Tag Team Championship
Incoming champions – Harlem Heat (Booker T and Stevie Ray)
Date	Winner	Event/Show	Note(s)
January 22	Sting and Lex Luger	Nitro	
June 24	Harlem Heat (Booker T and Stevie Ray)	Nitro	
July 24	The Steiner Brothers (Rick and Scott Steiner)	House show	
July 27	Harlem Heat (Booker T and Stevie Ray)	House show	
September 23	The Public Enemy (Johnny Grunge and Rocco Rock)	Nitro	
October 1	Harlem Heat (Booker T and Stevie Ray)	Saturday Night	Aired on tape delay on October 5.
October 27	The Outsiders (Kevin Nash and Scott Hall)	Halloween Havoc	

=== WWF ===
WWF World Heavyweight Championship
Incoming champion – Bret Hart
Date	Winner	Event/Show	Note(s)
March 31	Shawn Michaels	WrestleMania XII	It was a 60-minute Iron Man match that went into sudden death with the score 0-0.
November 17	Sycho Sid	Survivor Series	

WWF Intercontinental Championship
Incoming champion – Razor Ramon
Date	Winner	Event/Show	Note(s)
January 21	Goldust	Royal Rumble	
April 1	Vacant	Raw	Held up when a title defense against Savio Vega ended in a no contest
April 1	Goldust	Raw	Defeated Savio Vega in a rematch for the vacant title
June 23	Ahmed Johnson	King of the Ring	
August 12	Vacant	Raw	Ahmed Johnson forfeited the title after being attacked by the debuting Faarooq after winning an 11-man battle royal
September 23	Marc Mero	Raw	Defeated Faarooq in a tournament final
October 21	Hunter Hearst Helmsley	Raw	

WWF Tag Team Championship
Incoming champions – The Smoking Gunns (Billy and Bart Gunn)
Date	Winner	Event/Show	Note(s)
February 15	Vacated	House show	Vacated when Billy Gunn suffered a neck injury
March 31	The Bodydonnas (Skip and Zip)	WrestleMania XII	Defeated The Godwinns in a tournament final
May 19	The Godwinns (Henry O. and Phineas I. Godwinn)	House show	
May 26	The Smoking Gunns (Billy and Bart Gunn)	In Your House 8: Beware of Dog	
September 22	Owen Hart and The British Bulldog	In Your House 10: Mind Games	

Million Dollar Championship
Incoming champion – The Ringmaster
unsanctioned championship
Date	Winner	Event/Show	Note(s)
May 28	Abandoned	N/A	

== Debuts ==
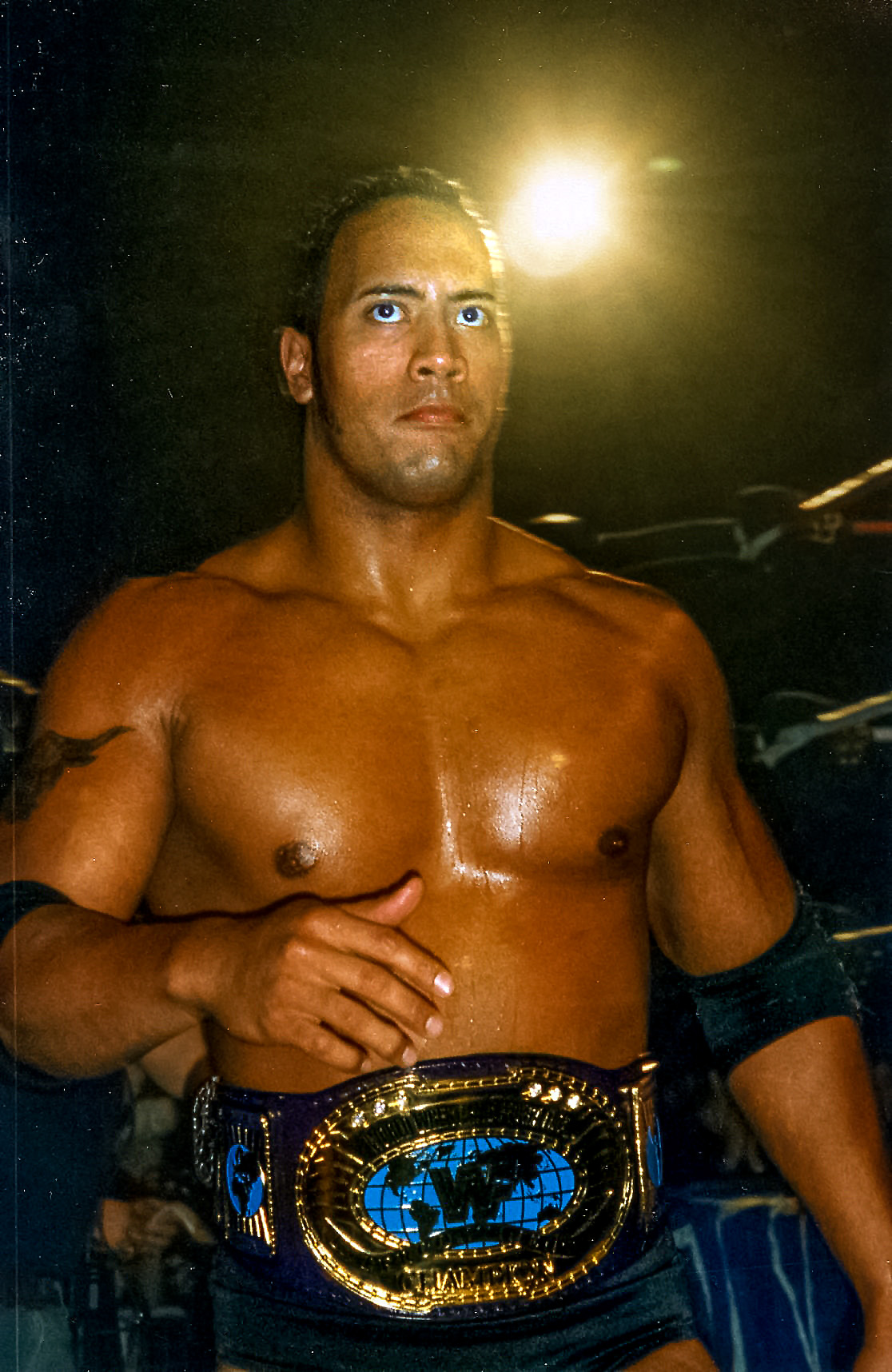
The Rock

- Uncertain debut date
  - Mari Apache
  - Miyuki Okada (SPWF)
  - Rumi Sekiguchi (All Japan Women's)
  - Yoshikazu Taru
- January 4 - Sayuri Okino (LLPW)
- March 10 – The Rock
- March 20 - Masakazu Fukuda
- April 14 - Aya Koyama (Jd' Star)
- April 23 - K-Ness
- April 29 - Rina Ishii (GAEA)
- May 2 – Sachie Abe
- May 16 - Adam Pearce
- July 14 - Momoe Nakanishi and Nanae Takahashi
- July 28 – Miho Wakizawa and Yachiyo Kawamoto (All Japan Women's)
- July 30 - Yuko Kosugi (Jd' Star)
- August 8 - H. C. Loc
- August 12 – Sakura Hirota
- September 15 - Fugofugo Yumeji
- September 16 - Miyuki Fujii (All Japan Women's)
- September 20 - Mark Henry
- October 5 - Nobuyuki Kurashima
- October 17 - MIKAMI
- October 20 - Keiichi Kawano
- November 2 - Tomohiro Ishii
- November 24 - Miyuki Sogabe (Jd' Star)
- September 15 – Takashi Sasaki
- December 28 - Sari Osumi (JWP)

== Births ==
- January 20 - Dante Chen
- February 13 - Chris Bey
- February 22 – Rabbit Miu
- March 2 – Kosuke Sato
- March 15 – Maxwell Jacob Friedman
- March 20 – Blair Davenport
- March 27 – Pom Harajuku
- March 31 – Sareee
- May 7 – Mike D Vecchio
- May 11 – Laurance Roman
- May 13
  - Wakana Uehara
  - Brutus Creed
- June 2 – Jacy Jayne
- June 20 – Rhio
- July 15 – Konami
- July 30 – Marko Stunt
- July 31 – Nightshade
- August 17
  - Adrian Alanis
  - Indi Hartwell
- August 28 - Colby Corino
- September 13 – Aya Sakura
- September 26 - Brandi Lauren
- October 11
  - Rhea Ripley
  - Yu Iizuka
- October 23 – Taishi Ozawa
- October 28 – Will Kroos
- October 29 - Tatum Paxley
- November 12 – Tatsuya Hanami
- November 28 – Saya Kamitani
- December 12 – Yoshiki Kato
- December 30 - Charlie Dempsey (wrestler)

== Retirements ==
- Akio Sato (1970–1996)
- Billy Jack Haynes (1982–1996)
- Damian Kane (1980–1996)
- Tom Zenk (1986–October 1996)
- Tyler Mane (1986–1996)
- Dick Slater (1972–October 1996)
- Dynamite Kid (December 24, 1975 – October 10, 1996)
- Espanto Jr. (1971–January 1996)
- Jerry Stubbs (1970–1996, return to wrestle for a match in 2019)
- Mr. Fuji (1965–1996)
- Steve Regal (1977–1996)
- Wahoo McDaniel (1961–July 1996)
- Rocky Iaukea (1981–1996)
- Tom Lister, Jr. (1989–March 1996)
- Tiger Conway Jr. (1971–1996)

== Deaths ==
- January 23 - Art White, 80
- May 3 – Ray Stevens, 60
- June 15 – Dick Murdoch, 49
- June 26 - Octavio Gaona, 94
- July 20 - The Missouri Mauler, 65
- July 23 – Herb Abrams, 41
- August 23 - Neil Superior, 33
- September 11 – Sapphire, 61

== See also ==
- List of WCW pay-per-view events
- List of WWE pay-per-view events
- List of FMW supercards and pay-per-view events
- List of ECW supercards and pay-per-view events
