= 1962 in professional wrestling =

1962 in professional wrestling describes the year's events in the world of professional wrestling.

== List of notable promotions ==
Only one promotion held notable shows in 1962.

Promotion Name	Abbreviation
Empresa Mexicana de Lucha Libre	EMLL

== Calendar of notable shows ==
Date	Promotion(s)	Event	Location	Main Event
April	EMLL	6. Aniversario de Arena México	Mexico City, Mexico	
September 21	EMLL	EMLL 29th Anniversary Show	Mexico City, Mexico	Antonio Poza (c) defeated Karloff Lagarde in a best two-out-of-three falls match for the NWA World Middleweight Championship
(c) – denotes defending champion(s)

== Notable Events ==
- Wrestling World hit the newsstands with its first issue

== Championship changes ==
=== EMLL ===
NWA World Light Heavyweight Championship
incoming champion - Gory Guerrero
No title changes

NWA World Middleweight Championship
incoming champion – Antonio Posa
Date	Winner	Event/Show	Note(s)
April 18	René Guajardo	EMLL show	
October 25	Rayo de Jalisco	EMLL show	

NWA World Welterweight Championship
incoming champion – Karloff Lagarde
No title changes

Mexican National Heavyweight Championship
incoming champion - Vacant
Date	Winner	Event/Show	Note(s)
May 13	Pepe Mendieta	EMLL show	Defeated Gran Lothario in a tournament final.

Mexican National Middleweight Championship
incoming champion – El Santo
No title changes

Mexican National Lightweight Championship
incoming champion – Juan Diaz
No title changes

Mexican National Light Heavyweight Championship
incoming champion – Rubén Juárez
No title changes

Mexican National Welterweight Championship
incoming champion – Karloff Lagarde
Date	Winner	Event/Show	Note(s)
April 4	Blue Demon	EMLL show	
April 28	Karloff Lagarde	EMLL show	

Mexican National Tag Team Championship
incoming champion – possibly Tarzán López and Henry Pilusso
Date	Winner	Event/Show	Note(s)
Uncertain	Los Rebeldes (Rene Guajardo and Karloff Lagarde)	EMLL show	

Mexican National Women's Championship
incoming champion – Uncertain
No title changes

=== NWA ===
NWA Worlds Heavyweight Championship
Incoming Champion – Buddy Rogers
Date	Winner	Event/Show	Note(s)
No title changes

== Debuts ==
- Debut date uncertain:
  - Bette Boucher
  - Bill Dundee
  - Bill Watts
  - Bob Armstrong
  - Bushwhacker Luke
  - Gary Hart
  - Mr. Fuji
  - Ox Baker
  - Ronnie Garvin
- January 13 – Espanto III
- March 19 – Dean Ho
- November 2– Archie Gouldie

== Retirements ==
- Gloria Barattini (1949-1962)
- Gorgeous George (1932-November 7, 1962)

== Births ==
- January 7 – Devil Masami
- January 9:
  - Luc Poirier
  - Tony Puccio
- January 12 – Luna Vachon(died in 2010)
- January 21 – Mark Curtis(died in 1999)
- January 25 – Rod Price
- January 31 – Reggie B. Fine
- February 7 – Max Thrasher
- February 11 – Bestia Salvaje(died in 2008)
- February 13 – Baby Doll
- February 19 – Franky Gee (died in 2005)
- February 21 – Billy Silverman
- March 13 – Vandal Drummond
- March 19 – Jimmy Korderas
- March 22 – Villano V (died in 2024)
- March 28 – The Warlord
- April 3:
  - Curly Moe (died in 2015)
  - Jeff Van Camp
- April 10 – Super Muñeco (died in 2022)
- April 12 – Nobuhiko Takada
- April 13 – Diane Von Hoffman (died in 2017)
- April 29 – Sunshine
- May 5 – Princess Victoria (wrestler)
- May 10 – Klondyke Kate
- May 22 – Brian Pillman(died in 1997)
- May 26 – Victor Zangiev
- May 30 – Martha Villalobos
- June 15:
  - Brad Armstrong (died in 2012)
  - Mark Fleming
- June 18 – Mitsuharu Misawa(died in 2009)
- June 26 – Bruiser Costa
- July 2 – Brakkus
- July 5 – Barry Hardy
- July 15 – Jesús Castillo Jr.
- July 18 – Dusty Wolfe
- July 29:
  - Scott Steiner
  - Sonny Onoo
  - Pirata Morgan
- July 31
  - Kevin Greene(died in 2020)
  - John Laurinaitis
- August 2 - DeWayne Bruce
- August 14 – Jeff Farmer
- August 15 – Kazuo Yamazaki
- September 2 – Tracy Smothers(died in 2020)
- September 7 – George South
- September 20 – Raijin Yaguchi
- September 24 – Kloudy
- September 28 – Atlantis
- October 2 – El Dandy
- October 19 – Evander Holyfield
- October 30 – Davey Rich
- October 31 – Bill Fralic(died in 2018)
- November 4 – El Hijo del Diablo
- November 24:
  - Velvet McIntyre
  - Masayoshi Motegi
- November 28 – Davey Boy Smith(died in 2002)
- November 30 – Jimmy Del Ray(died in 2014)
- December 16 – William Perry
- December 23 – Keiji Muto
- December 26 – Mark Starr(died in 2013)

== Deaths ==
- March 2 – Gus Kallio (70)
- April 20 – Joe Malcewicz (65)
- August 9 – Sam Avey (67)
- August 22 – Charles Rigoulot (58)
- September 26 – Alexander Zass (74)
