= In Your House 5 =

1995 World Wrestling Federation pay-per-view event

- VHS cover featuring The British Bulldog and Bret Hart
- Promotion: World Wrestling Federation
- Date: December 17, 1995
- City: Hershey, Pennsylvania
- Venue: Hersheypark Arena
- Attendance: 7,289
- Buy rate: 84,000

Pay-per-view chronology
← Previous; Survivor Series	Next → Royal Rumble

In Your House chronology
← Previous; 4	Next → 6

In Your House 5, retroactively titled In Your House 5: Season's Beatings, was a 1995 professional wrestling pay-per-view (PPV) event produced by the World Wrestling Federation (WWF, renamed WWE in 2002). It was the fifth In Your House and took place on December 17, 1995, at the Hersheypark Arena in Hershey, Pennsylvania. The event's retroactive renaming was in reference to its winter holiday scheduling.

Six matches aired as part of the PPV broadcast and three additional matches were held as dark matches. The main event was a rematch from the 1992 SummerSlam as Bret Hart defended the WWF Championship against his brother-in-law The British Bulldog. On the undercard, The Undertaker faced off against King Mabel in a Casket match. Another match on the show could only end when either Hunter Hearst Helmsley or Henry O. Godwinn was thrown into a hog pen that was erected in the arena.

With the launch of the WWE Network in 2014, this show became available on demand, but does not include the three dark matches which were held after the main show.

== Production ==
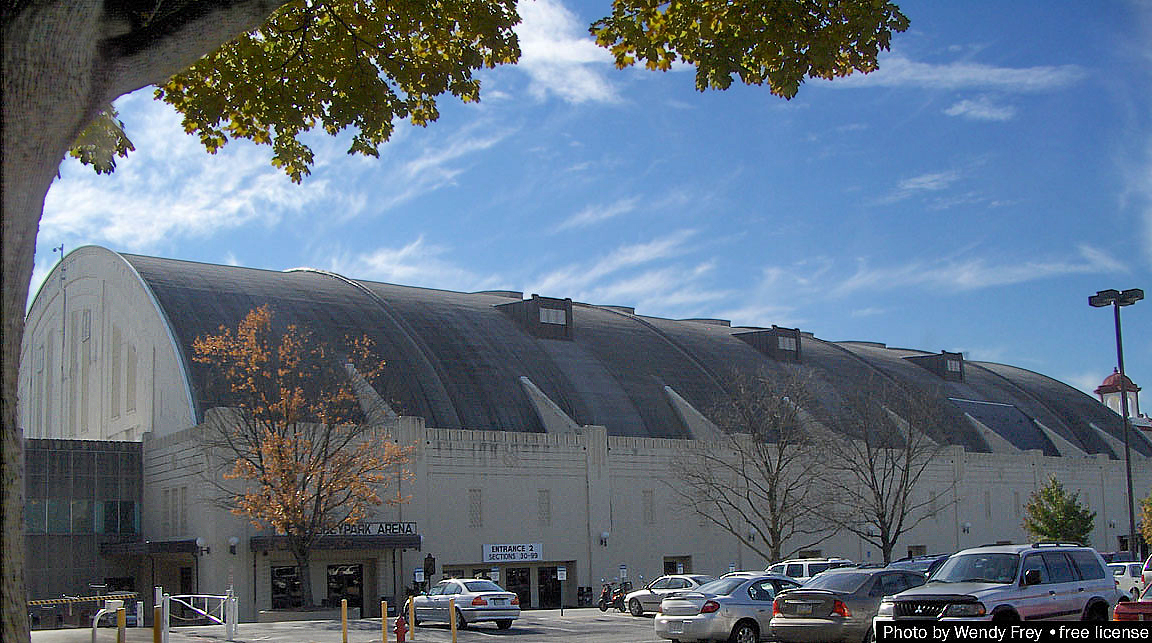
The fifth In Your House was held at the Hersheypark Arena in Hershey, Pennsylvania.

=== Background ===
Other on-screen personnel
Role:	Name:
Commentator	Vince McMahon
Commentator	Jerry Lawler
Commentator	Jeff Jarrett (Johnson vs Landell)
Interviewer	Jerry Lawler
Interviewer	Jim Ross
Interviewer	Todd Pettengill
Ring announcer	Manny Garcia
Referee	Mike Chioda
Referee	Jack Doan
Referee	Earl Hebner
Referee	Tim White

In Your House was a series of monthly professional wrestling pay-per-view (PPV) events first produced by the World Wrestling Federation (WWF, renamed WWE in 2002) in May 1995. They aired when the promotion was not holding one of its then-five major PPVs (WrestleMania, King of the Ring, SummerSlam, Survivor Series, and Royal Rumble) and were sold at a lower cost. The fifth In Your House was scheduled for December 17, 1995, at the Hersheypark Arena in Hershey, Pennsylvania. While this event was originally known simply as In Your House 5, it was later retroactively renamed as In Your House 5: Season's Beatings as a reference to the event's winter holiday scheduling.

=== Storylines ===
In Your House 5 featured professional wrestling matches involving different wrestlers from pre-existing scripted feuds, plots, and storylines that were played out on Monday Night Raw and other WWF television programs.

== Event ==
Following the first match on the broadcast, Jerry Lawler introduced the returning Jeff Jarrett and presented him with a storyline gold record for supposedly selling 500,000 copies of his country music album, Ain't I Great. Lawler then invited Jarrett to do commentary with himself and Vince McMahon for the next match. In the second match Ahmed Johnson was originally supposed to face Dean Douglas, but Douglas claimed that he could not compete due to a back injury. He introduced Buddy Landel (his "graduate student") as his replacement for the night. Johnson won the match, and afterward Jarrett attacked Johnson with his gold record.

Another non-match segment saw Savio Vega handing out presents to children with Santa Claus, when Ted DiBiase came out and ordered Santa to attack Vega. He revealed that "Santa" was actually Xanta Klaus, Santa's evil brother who lives in the South Pole and steals presents. Xanta was portrayed by SMW wrestler, Jon Rechner, later better known as Balls Mahoney. The Xanta gimmick appeared very little after this.

== Results ==
No.	Results	Stipulations	Times
1	Razor Ramon and Marty Jannetty defeated The 1-2-3 Kid and Sycho Sid (with Ted DiBiase)	Tag team match	12:22
2	Ahmed Johnson defeated Buddy Landel (with Dean Douglas)	Singles match	0:45
3	Hunter Hearst Helmsley defeated Henry O. Godwinn by throwing Godwinn in the hog pen	Arkansas Hog Pen match Hillbilly Jim was the special guest referee.	8:58
4	Owen Hart (with Jim Cornette) defeated Diesel by disqualification	Singles match	4:34
5	The Undertaker (with Paul Bearer) defeated King Mabel (with Sir Mo) by putting Mabel in the casket with the lid completely shut	Casket match	6:11
6	Bret Hart (c) defeated The British Bulldog (with Diana Smith and Jim Cornette)	Singles match for the WWF Championship	21:09
7^{D}	Goldust defeated Duke Droese	Singles match	6:38
8^{D}	Barry Horowitz, Hakushi, and The Smoking Gunns (Billy Gunn and Bart Gunn) defeated Yokozuna, Isaac Yankem, DDS, and The Bodydonnas (Skip and Zip) (with Sunny)	Eight-man tag team match	11:38
9^{D}	Bob Backlund defeated Savio Vega	Singles match	6:22
(c) / – the champion(s) heading into the match; D / – this was a dark match
