= Just Another Night =

Just Another Night may refer to:

- "Just Another Night" (Icona Pop song), a 2014 single from This Is... Icona Pop (2013)
- "Just Another Night" (Mick Jagger song), a 1985 single from the album She's the Boss
- "Just Another Night", a song in the 1931 film The Age for Love by Alfred Newman
- "Just Another Night", a 1978 single by Cat Stevens from his album Back to Earth
- "Just Another Night", a 1979 single by Ian Hunter from his album You're Never Alone with a Schizophrenic
- ECW Just Another Night, a 1996 event staged by the professional wrestling promotion Extreme Championship Wrestling
