= In Your House 6 =

1996 World Wrestling Federation pay-per-view event

- VHS cover, showcasing Bret Hart and Diesel
- Promotion: World Wrestling Federation
- Date: February 18, 1996
- City: Louisville, Kentucky
- Venue: Louisville Gardens
- Attendance: 5,500
- Buy rate: 186,000

Pay-per-view chronology
← Previous; Royal Rumble	Next → WrestleMania XII

In Your House chronology
← Previous; 5	Next → Good Friends, Better Enemies

In Your House 6, retroactively titled In Your House 6: Rage in the Cage, was a 1996 professional wrestling pay-per-view (PPV) event produced by the World Wrestling Federation (WWF, renamed WWE in 2002). It was the sixth In Your House and took place on February 18, 1996, at the Louisville Gardens in Louisville, Kentucky. The event's retroactive renaming was in reference to the main event of the show being a Steel Cage match.

Five matches were broadcast on the pay-per-view, and there were also three dark matches as well as one match on the Free for All pre-show. In the aforementioned main event, Bret Hart retained the WWF Championship against Diesel by escaping the cage. With the launch of the WWE Network in 2014, this show became available on demand; however, it does not include the three dark matches held after the main show.

== Production ==
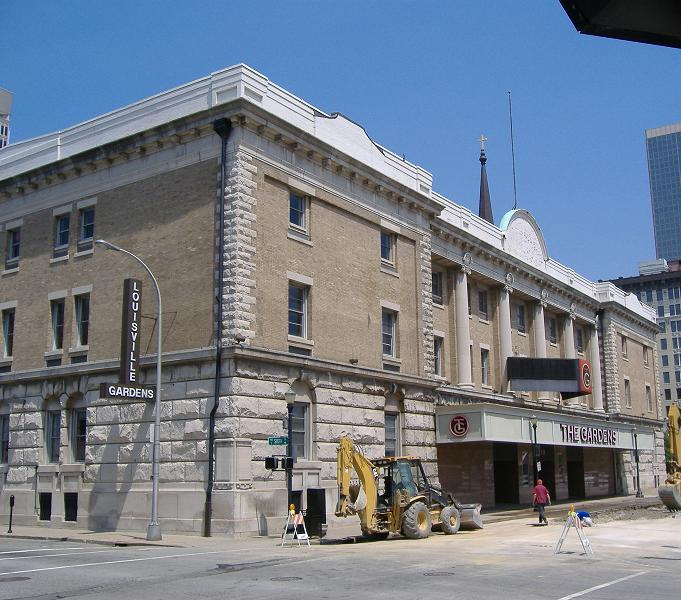
The sixth In Your House was held at the Louisville Gardens in Louisville, Kentucky.

=== Background ===
In Your House was a series of monthly professional wrestling pay-per-view (PPV) events first produced by the World Wrestling Federation (WWF, renamed WWE in 2002) in May 1995. They aired when the promotion was not holding one of its then-five major PPVs (WrestleMania, King of the Ring, SummerSlam, Survivor Series, and Royal Rumble) and were sold at a lower cost. The sixth In Your House was scheduled for February 18, 1996, at the Louisville Gardens in Louisville, Kentucky. While this event was originally known simply as In Your House 6, it was later retroactively renamed as In Your House 6: Rage in the Cage in reference to the main event being a Steel Cage match.

=== Storylines ===
The professional wrestling matches at In Your House 6 featured professional wrestlers performing as characters in scripted events pre-determined by the hosting promotion, the WWF. Storylines between the characters played out on WWF's primary television program, Monday Night Raw.

At the 1995 Survivor Series, Bret Hart defeated Diesel to win the WWF Championship. Diesel, who had been a face throughout his time as champion, began showing more and more heel tendencies both in his wrestling style and comments towards other wrestlers; at the 1996 Royal Rumble,.he attacked referee Earl Hebner during Hart's title match against The Undertaker, costing the latter his opportunity for the championship. After this, Bret Hart was scheduled to defend the championship against Diesel on In Your House 6. To prevent any outside interferences, it was stipulated as a Steel Cage match

In November 1995, 1-2-3 Kid turned on Razor Ramon and joined Ted Dibiase's heel Million Dollar Corporation. This would result in the two squaring off against each other in a tag team match at In Your House 5, before their feud took a month-long lapse after Goldust pursued Ramon's Intercontinental Championship. At the 1996 Royal Rumble, the feud resumed after 1-2-3 Kid interfered in Ramon's match against Goldust and cost him the Intercontinental Championship. This would lead the two wrestling at the event in the first ever "crybaby match," which involved a stipulation requiring that the winner force the loser to suck on a giant baby bottle and wear baby powder and a diaper.

Another rivalry leading into the event was between Shawn Michaels and Owen Hart. In autumn 1995, Michaels took a hiatus from wrestling due to an injury sustained in a real-life attack. Michaels teased retirement but returned in January 1996 to win the 1996 Royal Rumble match, earning him a title opportunity at WrestleMania XII. However, Owen Hart taunted Michaels, claiming credit for the injury, leading to a match at the event, in which Michaels put his title opportunity on the line.

== Event ==
Other on-screen personnel
Role:	Name:
Commentator	Vince McMahon
Commentator	Jerry Lawler
Interviewer	Todd Pettengill
Interviewer	Dok Hendrix
Ring announcer	Howard Finkel
Referee	Mike Chioda
Referee	Jack Doan
Referee	Earl Hebner
Referee	Tim White

During the main event Steel Cage match, The Undertaker emerged inside the steel cage by breaking through the ring mat and attacked Diesel, dragging him down through the hole to allow Bret Hart to climb over the top of the cage to win the match.

After the matches shown live on pay-per-view, three untelevised dark matches were contested at the venue.

== Aftermath ==
As a result of his victory against Owen Hart, Shawn Michaels challenged Bret Hart for the WWF World Heavyweight Championship in the main event of WrestleMania XII in an Iron Man match. Michaels won the match and his first WWF World Heavyweight Championship. Bret Hart took a six-month hiatus from wrestling. Following the Undertaker's interference in the Steel Cage match, he wrestled and defeated Diesel at WrestleMania XII.

== Results ==
No.	Results	Stipulations	Times
1^{F}	Jake Roberts defeated Tatanka (with Ted DiBiase)	Singles match	5:36
2	Razor Ramon defeated The 1–2–3 Kid (with Ted DiBiase)	Crybaby match	12:01
3	Hunter Hearst Helmsley (with Elizabeth Hilden) defeated Duke Droese	Singles match	9:38
4	Yokozuna defeated The British Bulldog (with Jim Cornette) by disqualification	Singles match	5:05
5	Shawn Michaels defeated Owen Hart (with Jim Cornette)	Singles match for Michael's title opportunity for the WWF Championship at WrestleMania XII	15:57
6	Bret Hart (c) defeated Diesel by escaping the cage	Steel Cage match for the WWF Championship	19:13
7^{D}	Ahmed Johnson defeated Isaac Yankem, DDS	Singles match	11:15
8^{D}	The Godwinns (Henry O. Godwinn and Phineas I. Godwinn) (with Hillbilly Jim) defeated The Bodydonnas (Skip and Zip) (with Sunny)	Tag team match	10:06
9^{D}	The Undertaker (with Paul Bearer) defeated Goldust (c) (with Marlena) by countout	Singles match for the WWF Intercontinental Championship	13:40
(c) / – the champion(s) heading into the match; F / – the match was broadcast prior to the pay-per-view on Free for All; D / – this was a dark match
