= Elizabeth Hilden =

American adult model (born 1970)

- Born: November 5, 1970 (age 55); Independence, Missouri, U.S.
- Other name: Elizabeth Ann Hilden

Elizabeth Hilden (born November 5, 1970), is a former American adult model.

== Career ==
Hilden made her debut as an adult model for Penthouse as their Pet of the Month in June 1995 and went on to be voted Penthouse Pet of the Year for 1997. As a Penthouse Pet, she was featured in a variety of Penthouse publications and videos. Hilden not only appeared in several "Penthouse" videos, but also was featured in such men's magazines as "Taboo," "High Society," "Leg World," and "D-cup." Moreover, Hilden posed for soft-core photo shoots for noted glamour photographer Suze Randall which included some leg fetish material.

She made a professional wrestling appearance in 1996 when she appeared as Hunter Hearst Helmsley's valet during the In Your House 6 event.

=== Other ventures ===
After finishing her modeling responsibilities for Penthouse, Hilden moved back to Missouri and started her own business. She owns a tattoo and piercing parlor called "Purgatory Tattoos" in her hometown of Independence. The business features a 35-foot school bus that was converted into a mobile tattoo shop and is taken to Sturgis, South Dakota every year for the annual motorcycle rally.

== Personal life ==
Hilden is a motorcycle enthusiast.

1970s	Evelyn Treacher	Stephanie McLean	Tina McDowall	Patricia Barrett	Avril Lund
1970s	Anneka Di Lorenzo	Laura Bennett Doone	Victoria Lynn Johnson	Dominique Maure	Cheryl Rixon
1980s	Isabella Ardigo	Danielle Deneux	Corinne Alphen	Sheila Kennedy	Linda Kenton
1980s	None	Cody Carmack	Mindy Farrar	Patty Mullen	Ginger Miller
1990s	Stephanie Page	Simone Brigitte	Jisel	Julie Strain	Sasha Vinni
1990s	Gina LaMarca	Andi Sue Irwin	Elizabeth Ann Hilden	Paige Summers	Nikie St. Gilles
2000s	Juliet Cariaga	Zdeňka Podkapová	Megan Mason	Sunny Leone	Victoria Zdrok
2000s	Martina Warren	Jamie Lynn	Heather Vandeven	Erica Ellyson	Taya Parker
2010s	Taylor Vixen	Nikki Benz	Jenna Rose	Nicole Aniston	Lexi Belle
2010s	Layla Sin	Kenna James	Jenna Sativa	Gina Valentina	Gianna Dior
2020s	Lacy Lennon	Kenzie Anne	Amber Marie	Tahlia Paris	Renee Olstead
2020s	Kassie Wallis	-	-	-	-
