= WWF Xperience =

1996 World Wrestling Federation event

Ex-perience
- Promotion: World Wrestling Federation
- Date: August 24, 1996
- City: Toronto, Ontario, Canada
- Venue: Exhibition Stadium
- Attendance: 21,211

WWE in Canada chronology
← Previous; In Your House 9: International Incident	Next → In Your House 16: Canadian Stampede

WWF Ex-perience was a live professional wrestling event held by the World Wrestling Federation (WWF), which took place on August 24, 1996 from the Exhibition Stadium in Toronto, Ontario, Canada. It was considered to be the tenth anniversary of The Big Event which took place ten years earlier in the same venue. The event is also known as "Xperience".

== Event ==
Rowdy Roddy Piper came out and talked to the Toronto crowd before the first match.

During the opening match, The Godwinns (Henry O. Godwinn and Phineas I. Godwinn) (with Hillbilly Jim) defeated The New Rockers (Marty Jannetty and Leif Cassidy), following Phineas pinning Cassidy.

The following match saw Hunter Hearst Helmsley defeat Bob Holly via pinfall. The next match was a Caribbean Strap match in which Savio Vega defeated Justin Bradshaw. This was followed by Jose Lothario defeating Jim Cornette.

During the next match between Stone Cold Steve Austin and Marc Mero, Mankind came to the ring and attempted to kidnap Sable. Mero was distracted by this and went after Mankind, resulting in Mero being counted out.

The following match was a lumberjack match, with the Toronto Argonauts serving as the lumberjacks. During this match, Sycho Sid defeated Vader following a chokeslam.

The next match saw Faarooq make quick work of Aldo Montoya for the victory.

During the WWF Tag Team Championship, the champions, The Smoking Gunns (Billy Gunn and Bart Gunn) retained their titles against Owen Hart and The British Bulldog. After The British Bulldog hit a running powerslam and went for the cover, Sunny pulled the referee out of the ring, forcing the referee to disqualify the Gunns.

The second to last match, was a casket match between The Undertaker and Mankind. After Undertaker hit Mankind with a chokeslam followed by a tombstone, Undertaker rolled Mankind into the casket for the victory,

The main event saw Shawn Michaels defend the WWF World Heavyweight Championship against Goldust in a Ladder match. After Michaels hit Goldust with the Sweet Chin Music, he was able to successfully climb the ladder to retain the title.

== Results ==
No.	Results	Stipulations	Times
1	The Godwinns (Henry O. Godwinn and Phineas I. Godwinn) (with Hillbilly Jim) defeated The New Rockers (Marty Jannetty and Leif Cassidy)	Tag Team match	10:35
2	Hunter Hearst Helmsley defeated Bob Holly	Singles match	11:47
3	Savio Vega defeated Justin Bradshaw (with Uncle Zebekiah)	Caribbean Strap match	10:28
4	Jose Lothario defeated Jim Cornette	Singles match	3:30
5	Stone Cold Steve Austin defeated Marc Mero (with Sable) by countout	Singles match	14:03
6	Sycho Sid defeated Vader	Lumberjack match	9:23
7	Faarooq defeated Aldo Montoya	Singles match	0:46
8	Owen Hart and The British Bulldog defeated The Smoking Gunns (Billy Gunn and Bart Gunn) (c) (with Sunny) by disqualification	Tag Team match for the WWF Tag Team Championship	7:56
9	The Undertaker defeated Mankind (with Paul Bearer)	Casket match	13:24
10	Shawn Michaels (c) defeated Goldust (with Marlena)	Ladder match for the WWF World Heavyweight Championship	18:14
(c) / – the champion(s) heading into the match

== See also ==
- 1996 in professional wrestling
- Professional wrestling in Canada
