= Royal Rumble (1996) =

World Wrestling Federation pay-per-view event

- Promotional poster featuring Diesel performing a Big Boot on Owen Hart
- Promotion: World Wrestling Federation
- Date: January 21, 1996
- City: Fresno, California
- Venue: Selland Arena
- Attendance: 9,600
- Buy rate: 269,000
- Tagline: You've been Warned!

Pay-per-view chronology
← Previous; In Your House 5	Next → In Your House 6

Royal Rumble chronology
← Previous; 1995	Next → 1997

The 1996 Royal Rumble was a professional wrestling pay-per-view (PPV) event produced by the World Wrestling Federation (WWF, renamed WWE in 2002). It was the ninth annual Royal Rumble event and took place on January 21, 1996, at the Selland Arena in Fresno, California. The event was based around the men's Royal Rumble match, a modified 30-man battle royal in which the participants enter at timed intervals instead of all beginning in the ring at the same time and the winner received a WWF Championship match at WrestleMania XII.

The main event saw The Undertaker face Bret Hart for the WWF Championship, where Undertaker won via disqualification due to interference from Diesel; Hart retained as titles do not change hands on disqualification unless stipulated. The main match on the undercard was the 1996 Royal Rumble match, which Shawn Michaels won by last eliminating Diesel, becoming the second person to win the Royal Rumble match twice, and back-to-back, after Hulk Hogan in 1990 and 1991. This was the second Royal Rumble event in which the titular match was not the main event, after the inaugural 1988 event.

== Production ==
=== Background ===
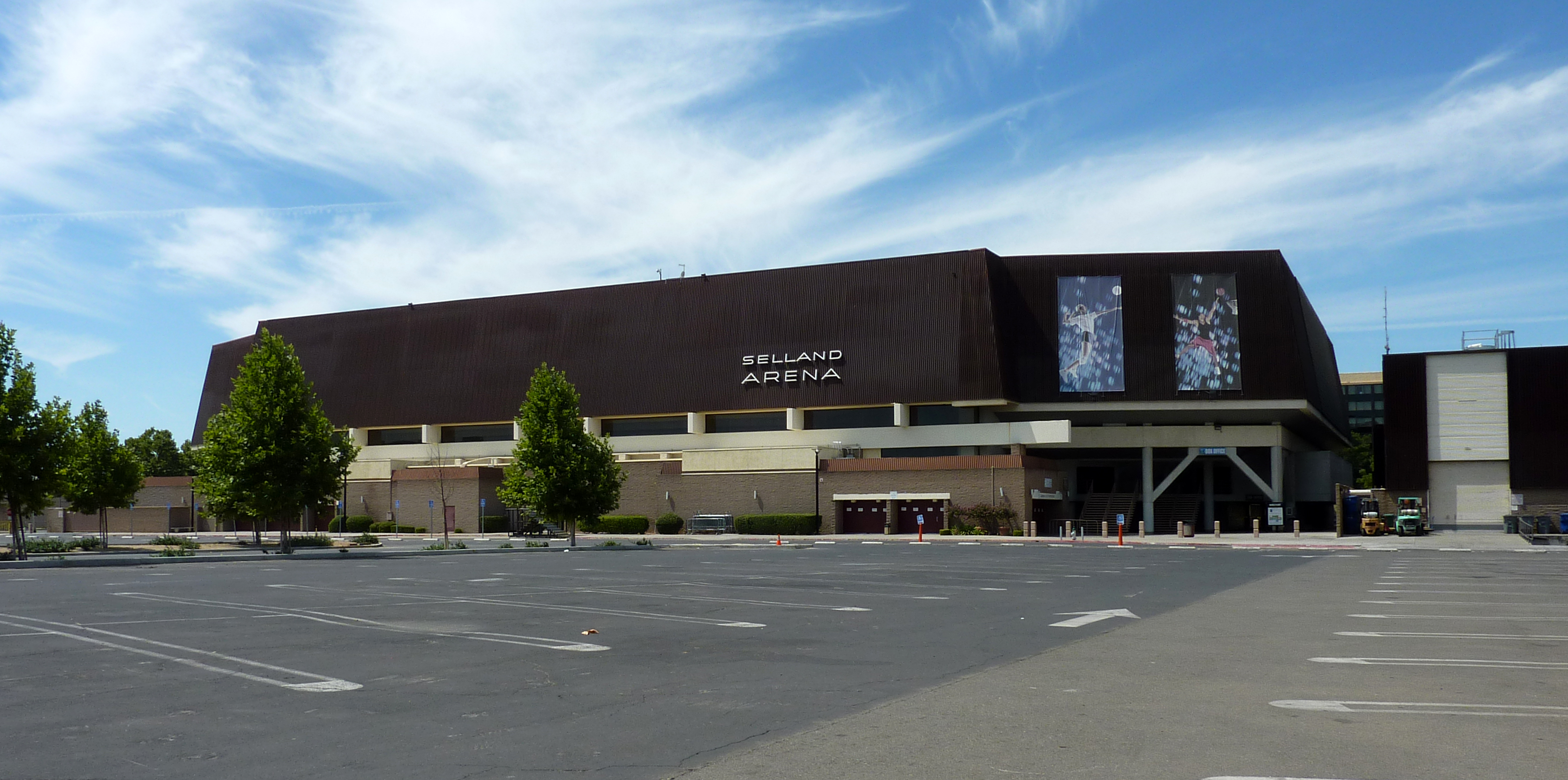
The ninth annual Royal Rumble event was held the Selland Arena in Fresno, California.

The Royal Rumble is an annual professional wrestling event, produced every January by the World Wrestling Federation (WWF, renamed WWE in 2002) since 1988; that first event was a television special before it became an annual pay-per-view (PPV) beginning in 1989. It is one of the promotion's original four PPVs, along with WrestleMania, SummerSlam, and Survivor Series, referred to as the "Big Four", and was also considered one of the "Big Five" PPVs with the addition of King of the Ring in 1993. It is named after and centered on the men's Royal Rumble match. The ninth Royal Rumble event was scheduled to be held on January 21, 1996, at the Selland Arena in Fresno, California.

The Royal Rumble match is a modified battle royal in which the participants enter at timed intervals instead of all beginning in the ring at the same time, and the match generally features 30 wrestlers. Since 1993, the winner earns a world championship match at that year's WrestleMania. For 1996, the winner earned a match for the WWF Championship at WrestleMania XII. This was also the first time the Royal Rumble match had theme music used when a wrestler entered the match.

=== Storylines ===
The event comprised five matches which resulted from scripted storylines. Results were predetermined by the WWF's writers, while storylines were produced on WWF's weekly television show, Monday Night Raw.

== Event ==
Other on-screen personnel
Role:	Name:
Commentators	Vince McMahon
Commentators	Mr. Perfect
Interviewer	Todd Pettengill
Interviewer	Dok Hendrix
Ring announcer	Howard Finkel
Referee	Earl Hebner
Referee	Jim Korderas
Referee	Jack Coan
Referee	Tim White

In a match occurring on the Free For All preshow, Duke "The Dumpster" Droese defeated Hunter Hearst Helmsley. WWF president Gorilla Monsoon stepped in after Droese was pinned and reversed the referee's decision, disqualifying Helmsley for using brass knuckles to knock Droese out. As a result, Droese won the right to be entry number 30 in the Royal Rumble match, while Helmsley had to enter first.

Featured matches on the undercard were the 1996 Royal Rumble match which was won by Shawn Michaels, who last eliminated Diesel to win the match, making it his second straight Royal Rumble win; Goldust defeating Razor Ramon for the WWF Intercontinental Championship; and The Smoking Gunns (Billy Gunn and Bart Gunn) defeating The Bodydonnas (Skip and Zip) to retain the WWF Tag Team Championship.

The final event was for the WWF Championship between the Undertaker and Bret Hart. As the Undertaker was about to win the match after performing the Tombstone Piledriver against Hart, Diesel, who lost to Michaels at the Rumble earlier, interfered and pulled the referee out of the ring, resulting in the Undertaker winning by disqualification. However, Hart retained the title and the event ended with Diesel walking away.

== Aftermath ==
The 1996 Royal Rumble marked the first pay-per-view appearance of Steve Austin, under the name "The Ringmaster", a blond-haired master ring technician and the featured wrestler in the "Million Dollar Man" Ted DiBiase's stable. His elimination was accidental as he was supposed to be in the final four, but he slipped on the ropes and fell out when he was doing a spot with Fatu. In the weeks following the Royal Rumble, "The Ringmaster" gimmick was met with an indifferent reaction from fans, prompting Austin to create a new look and gimmick for himself: the "Stone Cold" gimmick, that of a foul-mouthed individual who drank beer and freely spoke his mind, uncaring of who he angered or whether he had friends (he often attacked heel and face alike), openly disregarded the rules and fought until his last breath. As "Stone Cold", Austin—who began his first major feud, with Savio Vega, under "The Ringmaster" moniker and continued it after changing his gimmick—went on to become one of the WWF's biggest stars and helped usher in the promotion's Attitude Era.

== Results ==
No.	Results	Stipulations	Times
1^{F}	Duke Droese defeated Hunter Hearst Helmsley by disqualification	Singles match for entry #30 in the Royal Rumble match	6:25
2	Ahmed Johnson defeated Jeff Jarrett by disqualification	Singles match	6:40
3	The Smoking Gunns (Bart Gunn and Billy Gunn) (c) defeated The Bodydonnas (Skip and Zip) (with Sunny)	Tag team match for the WWF Tag Team Championship	11:14
4	Goldust (with Marlena) defeated Razor Ramon (c)	Singles match for the WWF Intercontinental Championship	14:17
5	Shawn Michaels won by last eliminating Diesel	30-man Royal Rumble match for a WWF Championship match at WrestleMania XII	58:49
6	The Undertaker (with Paul Bearer) defeated Bret Hart (c) by disqualification	Singles match for the WWF Championship	28:31
(c) / – the champion(s) heading into the match; F / – the match was broadcast prior to the pay-per-view on Free for All

=== Royal Rumble entrances and eliminations ===
A new entrant came out approximately every 2 minutes.

– Winner

Draw	Entrant	Order	Eliminated by	Time	Eliminations
1	Hunter Hearst Helmsley	19	Diesel	48:04	1
2	Henry O. Godwinn	2	Jake Roberts	16:24	0
3	Bob Backlund	1	Yokozuna	12:22	0
4	Jerry Lawler	16	Shawn Michaels	36:02	0
5	Bob Holly	18	The Ringmaster	39:35	0
6	King Mabel	3	Yokozuna	12:14	0
7	Jake Roberts	6	Vader	14:39	2
8	Dory Funk Jr.	5	Savio Vega	10:53	0
9	Yokozuna	11	Shawn Michaels	19:14	3
10	1-2-3 Kid	13	Shawn Michaels	15:40	0
11	Takao Omori	4	Hunter Hearst Helmsley and Jake Roberts	02:48	0
12	Savio Vega	10	Vader	12:28	1
13	Vader	12	Shawn Michaels	11:04	4
14	Doug Gilbert	7	Vader	02:59	0
15	Squat Team #1	8	Vader	01:11	0
16	Squat Team #2	9	Yokozuna	00:24	0
17	Owen Hart	21	Diesel and Shawn Michaels	20:43	2
18	Shawn Michaels	-	Winner	26:10	8
19	Hakushi	14	Owen Hart	01:53	0
20	Tatanka	17	Diesel	04:09	1
21	Aldo Montoya	15	Tatanka	01:52	0
22	Diesel	29	Shawn Michaels	17:51	5
23	Kama	28	Diesel	15:57	1
24	The Ringmaster	23	Fatu	10:57	1
25	Barry Horowitz	20	Owen Hart	04:15	0
26	Fatu	24	Isaac Yankem, DDS	07:07	1
27	Isaac Yankem, DDS	25	Shawn Michaels	07:05	1
28	Marty Jannetty	22	The British Bulldog	02:35	0
29	The British Bulldog	27	Shawn Michaels	03:39	1
30	Duke Droese	26	Diesel and Kama	01:10	0

This was King Mabel's last appearance until he returned on June 30, 1998, for a one-off match with Ken Shamrock on Raw Is War.

This was Jake Roberts's return since his last appearance at Wrestlemania VIII on April 5, 1992.
