= The Big Event =

1986 World Wrestling Federation event

- The cover of the Coliseum Video release featuring Hulk Hogan
- Promotion: World Wrestling Federation
- Date: August 28, 1986
- City: Toronto, Ontario
- Venue: Exhibition Stadium
- Attendance: 61,470
- Tagline: The Biggest Event of All Time

WWE in Canada chronology
← Previous; First	Next → Frank Tunney Sr. Memorial Tag Team Tournament

The Big Event was a professional wrestling closed-circuit (CCTV) event produced by the World Wrestling Federation (WWF) on August 28, 1986, at Exhibition Stadium in Toronto, Ontario, Canada. The event was advertised locally in the July 15 Toronto Star as "Hulkamania" and was promoted as the headlining event of the 1986 Canadian National Exhibition. According to the WWF's Official Magazine, the event drew a total audience of just under 70,000 fans and matched sell-out crowds at Exhibition Stadium previously only drawn by The Who and Bruce Springsteen. Although attendance estimates vary from a paid attendance of 61,470 all the way up to a total attendance of 74,000, sources agree The Big Event set a professional wrestling outdoor attendance record at the time. According to Jim Hunt of the Toronto Sun, The Big Event grossed a reported one million Canadian dollars. Tickets ranged from $20 ringside to $8 further away, with profits from ticket sales alone estimated between $75,000 and $100,000

A VHS tape of the event was released later by Coliseum Home Video, with commentary by Gorilla Monsoon, Johnny Valiant, and Ernie Ladd. This 115 Minute tape featured edits to a number of the matches. In 2014, WWE Network made the same version of the event available on demand in the pay-per-view (PPV) section (although the event was not originally broadcast via pay-per-view).

On February 22, 2025, the show was added to the WWE Vault on YouTube.

== Background ==
The main event heading into the event was between WWF World Heavyweight Champion Hulk Hogan and Paul Orndorff for the WWF World Heavyweight Championship. Hogan and Orndorff's friendship became emphasized on the WWF's syndicated television programs throughout the summer, and eventually Adrian Adonis – host of the talk show segment The Flower Shop – began stirring up trouble between the two when he planted a suggestion that Orndorff was living in Hogan's shadow, calling him "Hulk Jr." and that he had gone soft by teaming with Hogan. With a series of seemingly minor incidents involving Hogan irritating Orndorff, the two eventually accepted a challenge match with Big John Studd and King Kong Bundy (who were managed by Orndorff's former manager Bobby "The Brain" Heenan), where Orndorff allowed Studd and Bundy to illegally double-team Hogan for an extended period of time before finally clearing them from the ring; Orndorff then helped Hogan to his feet, only to finish off Hogan with a clothesline and his finishing move, a piledriver. Shortly afterward, Orndorff announced he had re-hired former manager Bobby Heenan and demanded a title shot against Hogan. In the weeks leading up to the event, to help sell Orndorff's new heel character, he began using Hogan's entrance theme "Real American" and mocking him by mimicking several of Hogan's in-ring routines, such as cupping his ear to get fan reaction and flexing his muscles.

Among the other top feuds going at the time was Ricky "The Dragon" Steamboat and Jake "The Snake" Roberts. Roberts' first high-profile feud since entering the WWF earlier that year, the feud began when he attacked Steamboat before their match on Saturday Night's Main Event VI, finishing him off by hitting his finishing move, the DDT, onto the concrete floor, before resting his snake, Damien, on top of an unconscious Steamboat, all as Steamboat's wife, Bonnie, watched in horror. Steamboat later began bringing a "Komodo dragon" as his "pet" to combat the psychological effects of Roberts' snake. While Steamboat won most of their matches, the feud ratched to a point where a "Snake Pit" match (a no-disqualification match) was commissioned.

Another top feud ongoing was The Machines vs. the Bobby Heenan-led team of Big John Studd and King Kong Bundy. The feud's main fuel was Heenan's repeated claim that one of the Machines, the Giant Machine, was André the Giant attempting to circumvent a suspension for earlier no-showing for a tag-team match against Bundy and Studd, with both of whom André had been embroiled in a bitter feud. At the time, André had been suffering from the effects of a legitimate back injury and was beginning to suffer the effects of acromegaly, a health condition that resulted in his gigantism and eventually led to his death in 1993; his "suspension" also allowed him to take time off to film The Princess Bride, which would be released a year later.

== Results ==
No.	Results	Stipulations	Times
1	The Killer Bees (Jim Brunzell and B. Brian Blair) defeated Jimmy Jack Funk and Hoss Funk (with Jimmy Hart)	Tag team match	6:53
2	The Magnificent Muraco (with Mr. Fuji) vs. King Tonga ended in a time-limit draw	Singles match	20:00
3	Ted Arcidi defeated Tony Garea via submission	Singles match	2:41
4	Junkyard Dog defeated Adrian Adonis (with Jimmy Hart) via count out	Singles match	4:15
5	Dick Slater defeated Iron Mike Sharpe	Singles match	6:24
6	Bobby Heenan, King Kong Bundy and Big John Studd defeated The Machines (Super Machine and Big Machine) and Captain Lou Albano (with Giant Machine) via disqualification	Six-man tag team match	7:49
7	Ricky Steamboat defeated Jake Roberts	Snake Pit Match	10:17
8	Billy Jack Haynes defeated Hercules Hernandez	Singles match	6:08
9	The Fabulous Rougeaus (Jacques and Raymond) defeated The Dream Team (Greg Valentine and Brutus Beefcake)	Tag team match	14:51
10	Harley Race defeated Pedro Morales	Singles match	3:23
11	Hulk Hogan (c) defeated Paul Orndorff (with Bobby Heenan) via disqualification	Singles match for the WWF World Heavyweight Championship	11:05
(c) / – the champion(s) heading into the match

== Aftermath ==
The event faced cold weather and oversold sections. The Toronto Star reported attendees wearing layers of sweaters and jackets the evening of the event. Refunds were issued when several floor sections were oversold due to a ticket printing error, including tickets that had been sold to fans who waited hours for tickets the day they went on sale.

The following night, World Wrestling Federation hosted the Sam Muchnick Memorial Tournament in which Harley Race won by last defeating Ricky Steamboat. The Hogan-Orndorff feud continued to rage into the fall of 1986, with Orndorff – as he did at The Big Event – using Hogan's entrance theme "Real American" as his own theme. Eventually, the two settled their differences in a series of steel cage matches. The most highly publicized cage match took place in December 1986, and aired on Saturday Night's Main Event IX, where at one point Hogan and Orndorff both simultaneously exited the cage and their feet hit the floor (a condition of winning the match); when video replays proved inconclusive, the match was restarted, with Hogan eventually getting a decisive victory. The Hogan-Orndorff feud would be named Pro Wrestling Illustrated magazine's Feud of the Year for 1986, by a vote of the magazine's readers.

The Machines continued to feud with the Studd-Bundy tag team, with Heenan's wrestlers never able to unmask the Giant Machine and prove that he was really André the Giant, who was supposed to be under suspension. Eventually, the Machines disappeared and André's suspension was lifted, to the unexplained approval of Heenan. In real life, behind the scenes, the storyline for André's eventual heel turn and demand to face Hogan at WrestleMania III for the WWF World Heavyweight Championship was being planned, and André's health was steadily continuing to worsen. The Hogan-André storyline would begin playing out in January 1987, while the other two members of the Machines team – Blackjack Mulligan and Bill Eadie – would adopt new gimmicks. Mulligan reverted to his normal Blackjack gimmick as a face, while Eadie would begin competing successfully as "Ax", one half of a new tag team known as Demolition with "Smash", a Road Warriors-inspired team of power brawlers with Kiss-type face paint. While Mulligan would fade from the WWF in early 1987, as Ax of Demolition, Eadie would go on to win the WWF Tag Team Championship on three occasions between 1988 and 1990.

Downplayed at this supercard, but soon getting more and more hyped, was the feud between Hercules Hernandez and Billy Jack Haynes, two wrestlers who had feuded in several other organizations they had competed in at the same time. The feud began heating up in earnest in the late fall of 1986, culminating in a "Full Nelson Challenge" at WrestleMania III.

== See also ==
- Professional wrestling in Canada
- SummerSlam
- WWF Xperience
