= Kloudy =

American professional wrestler

Personal information
- Born: James Haney; September 24, 1962 (age 63) Manasquan, New Jersey, U.S.

Professional wrestling career
- Ring name(s): Kloudy; Kloudi; Cloudy; Jimmy Shoulders; Jim Hammer
- Billed height: 6 ft 1 in (1.85 m)
- Trained by: Larry Sharpe; Chuck Richards
- Debut: 1988
- Retired: 1998

James Haney (born September 24, 1962) is a retired American professional wrestler and manager best known for working in the World Wrestling Federation as Kloudy, sometimes spelled Cloudy, Cloudi, or Kloudi, managing the Bodydonnas. Also worked as Jimmy Shoulders in Extreme Championship Wrestling, and various New Jersey promotions.

== Professional wrestling career ==
=== Independents (1988–1996) ===
Haney was trained by New Jersey wrestler Larry Sharpe and his wrestling debut in 1988. He worked in the independents in New Jersey. He feud with Jason Knight in 1996 for NWA New Jersey.

=== World Wrestling Federation (1996) ===
Haney was hired by the WWF through Chris Candido (Skip), who he was friends with in New Jersey. He made his WWF debut in June 1996 at King of the Ring when the Bodydonnas (Skip and Zip) announced that they were searching for a new manager after replacing Sunny. Haney became their new manager and was named Kloudy, a transvestite. That night they wrestled The New Rockers (Marty Jannetty and Leif Cassidy) in a match that aired live on Free for All. Bodydonnas won when Skip pinned Cassidy after Kloudy kissed Cassidy. They appeared on WWF television programs urging fans to apply for the position.

In September 1996, Skip was injured and the Bodydonnas disbanded. Haney left the WWF.

=== Extreme Championship Wrestling (1997–1998) ===
In 1997, Haney made his debut for Extreme Championship Wrestling as Jimmy Shoulders. He wrestled his last match, losing to Chris Chetti.
