= CyberSlam (1996) =

1996 Extreme Championship Wrestling supercard event

- The ECW Arena
- Promotion: Extreme Championship Wrestling
- Date: February 17, 1996 (aired February 20, February 27, and March 5, 1996)
- City: Philadelphia, Pennsylvania, United States
- Venue: ECW Arena
- Attendance: 1,300

Event chronology
← Previous; Big Apple Blizzard Blast	Next → Just Another Night

CyberSlam chronology
← Previous; First	Next → 1997

CyberSlam (1996) was the first CyberSlam professional wrestling event produced by Extreme Championship Wrestling (ECW). The event took place on February 17, 1996 in the ECW Arena in Philadelphia, Pennsylvania in the United States.

10 professional wrestling matches were contested at the event. In the main event, Raven defeated The Sandman to retain the ECW World Heavyweight Championship. Other featured matches on the card were Shane Douglas versus Cactus Jack, 2 Cold Scorpio versus Sabu for the ECW World Television Championship and Francine and the Pitbulls (Pitbull #1 and Pitbull #2) versus Stevie Richards and the Eliminators (Kronus and Saturn) in a dog collar match. The event also featured the ECW return of Brian Pillman who had left World Championship Wrestling after its SuperBrawl VI pay-per-view six days prior.

Excerpts from CyberSlam aired on episodes #148, #149, and #150 of ECW Hardcore TV on February 20, February 27, and March 5, 1996. The bout between Sabu and 2 Cold Scorpio was included on the 2004 WWE DVD release The Rise and Fall of ECW and the 2009 WWE DVD release Wrestling's Highest Flyers, while the bout between Cactus Jack and Shane Douglas was included on the 2012 WWE DVD and Blu-ray release ECW Unreleased: Vol 1 and the 2013 WWE DVD and Blu-ray release For All Mankind: The Life and Career of Mick Foley.

== Storylines ==
The event featured wrestlers from pre-existing scripted feuds and storylines. Wrestlers portrayed villains, heroes, or less distinguishable characters in the scripted events that built tension and culminated in a wrestling match or series of matches played out on ECW's television program Hardcore TV.

On the January 30 episode of Hardcore TV, Raven defeated The Sandman to win the World Heavyweight Championship. After the match, Sandman turned face by refusing Woman's offer to jump to World Championship Wrestling (WCW). At Big Apple Blizzard Blast, Stevie Richards and The Blue Meanie offered Sandman to back out of another title match with Raven but Sandman told Richards to warn Raven that he would be coming for the title and then left the ring. Raven would then join the ring and Missy Hyatt came to confront Raven and refused his offer to join him and then Sandman came back and cleared Raven and his group from the ring with a kendo stick. On the February 6 episode of Hardcore TV, it was announced that Raven would defend the title against Sandman in a rematch at CyberSlam.

Shane Douglas returned to ECW at House Party after a failed stint in World Wrestling Federation (WWF) and talked about how one needed to kiss Vince McMahon's ass to stay in the WWF. On the January 30 episode of Hardcore TV, Cactus Jack stated that he would prefer to kiss McMahon's ass over kissing Tod Gordon's ass to stay in ECW, thus signalling that he was leaving ECW for WWF. Later that night, Jack and his tag team partner Mikey Whipwreck defeated Douglas and Tommy Dreamer in a tag team match when Jack smashed a chair into Douglas' face. Douglas said that he had received the move purposely to bring the extreme into Jack and a match was made between the two at CyberSlam.

At House Party, 911 and Rey Misterio, Jr. defeated The Eliminators (John Kronus and Perry Saturn) in a tag team match. After the match, Eliminators attacked their opponents and nailed Misterio with a Total Elimination. After the match, The Pitbulls (Pitbull #1 and Pitbull #2) and Francine attempted to make the save as 911 brawled with Taz and Eliminators knocked out Francine with a Total Elimination. At Big Apple Blizzard Blast, Eliminators defeated Cactus Jack and Mikey Whipwreck to win the World Tag Team Championship. After the match, Francine told Eliminators that she wanted to manage them but it turned out to be a ruse as she set them up for an attack by Pitbulls, who cut off Saturn's hair. On the January 30 episode of Hardcore TV, Stevie Richards apologized to Francine for abandoning her for Raven by Stevie Kicking her and then asked her if she was pregnant, which embarrassed her and Pitbulls attacked him and then Eliminators made the save by attacking Pitbulls. Later that night, it was announced that Pitbulls and Francine would compete against Eliminators and Richards in a Dog Collar match at CyberSlam.

== Event ==
Other on-screen personnel
Role	Name
Commentator	Joey Styles
Interviewer	Joey Styles
Ring announcer	Rocky Musciano
Referees	John Finegan
Referees	Brian Hildebrand
Referees	Jim Molineaux
Referees	Paul Richard

In the opening match of the event, the Bad Crew (Dog and Rose) and Judge Dredd competed against Dino Sendoff, Don E. Allen and the Dirt Bike Kid. Bad Crew hit a Doomsday Device to Allen to win the match. After the match, the Sandman Singapore caned all six competitors.

In the second bout, El Puerto Riqueño took on Spiros Greco. Greco hit a shoulder block and a pumphandle suplex to win the match.

In the third bout, Taz took on Joel Hartgood. Taz dominated his opponent and made him submit to a Tazmission for the quick victory. After the match, a bunch of wrestlers attempted to aid Hartgood but Taz attacked all of them until Mikey Whipwreck made the save by attacking Taz's manager Bill Alfonso at ringside. Taz followed with a Tazplex to Whipwreck and knocked him out with a Tazmission.

Brian Pillman (who used to be known in the company as California Brian), who had recently left World Championship Wrestling, returned to ECW in unusual circumstances. During an interview conducted in the ring by Joey Styles, Pillman insulted Eric Bischoff, calling him a commentator, a "gofer", and a "piece of shit". He then turned his attention to the ECW audience, derisively calling them "smart marks". After Styles attempted to end the interview, Pillman threatened to "yank out [his] Johnson" and urinate in the ring. Pillman was confronted by ECW owner Tod Gordon, booker Paul Heyman, and wrestler Shane Douglas, who had him removed from the ring by security guards. While being dragged from the arena, Pillman attacked a plant sitting in the audience with a fork he produced from his boot. Pillman's erratic behavior in the ring and backstage caused confusion amongst both members of the audience and his fellow wrestlers.

In the fourth bout, Buh Buh Ray Dudley took on Mr. Hughes. Hughes attacked Dances with Dudley, which led to Big Dick Dudley breaking a crutch over Hughes' back and Buh Buh hit a diving splash for the win.

In the fifth bout, the Gangstas (Mustafa and New Jack) were scheduled to compete against the Headhunters (Headhunter A and Headhunter B) but Jack was not present at the show and Mustafa was confronted by Damien Kane and Lady Alexandra, who offered him a job to shine their shoes and Mustafa said that he wanted a "handjob" from Alexandra and then he attacked Kane outside the ring until Headhunters came out and attacked Mustafa until The Bruise Brothers (Don Bruise and Ron Bruise) made the save to wrestle Headhunters in Gangstas' place. Don hit a big boot to a Headhunter for the win. After the match, Tommy Dreamer and Beulah McGillicutty were being interviewed by Joey Styles in the ring on Dreamer's injured shoulder until Raven's Nest showed up and Raven threatened to cut Dreamer's dick off for getting his girlfriend pregnant until Shane Douglas and the Bruise Brothers came to the ring to back up Dreamer. Dreamer told Douglas to leave him and then Douglas took Beulah to the backstage until the Bruises turned heels on Dreamer by attacking him and shoving his testicles into the ringpost repeatedly.

In the sixth bout, Axl Rotten took on J.T. Smith. Smith faked injury by intentionally falling from the top rope and pretending it to be an accident. Rotten turned his back and Smith hit Rotten in the back with a steel chair to win the match. After the match, Smith hit a moonsault on Rotten and continued to attack him after the match until Hack Meyers made the save.

In the seventh bout, Francine and the Pitbulls (Pitbull #1 and Pitbull #2) competed against Stevie Richards and the Eliminators (Kronus and Saturn) in a dog collar match. Pitbulls knocked out both members of Eliminators with superbombs and hit a powerbomb, neckbreaker combination to Richards from the top rope, enabling Francine to pin him for the win. After the match, Eliminators attacked Pitbulls and Francine by laying them out with Total Eliminations.

In the eighth bout, 2 Cold Scorpio defended the ECW World Television Championship against Sabu. After a back and forth match, Sabu eventually hit an Arabian Facebuster to Scorpio and covered him but the thirty-minute time limit expired before the referee could make a three count. As a result, Scorpio retained the title.

In the ninth bout, Shane Douglas competed against Cactus Jack. Douglas repeatedly nailed Jack in the head with a chair but Jack refused to quit and called out his tag team partner Mikey Whipwreck for help. Douglas applied a figure four leglock on Jack and Whipwreck turned on Jack by hitting him with a chair and Douglas pinned him for the win.

In the main event, Raven defended the ECW World Heavyweight Championship against the Sandman. After repeated interference by Raven's Nest, Raven shoved Sandman from the top rope face-first onto a steel chair and hit a DDT to retain the title. After the match, The Blue Meanie mocked Sandman and accidentally spilled beer on him to revive the Sandman, who then caned Raven's Nest.

== Reception ==
CyberSlam received positive reviews from critics. Kyle of Wrestling Recaps wrote "A huge mix bag tonight, but the good was remembered more in my head than the bad." He appreciated the worked shoot promo of Brian Pillman, the World Television Championship match and Shane Douglas versus Mick Foley match. He further wrote "There was some crappy stuff in the midcard, which is an easy pass, and the main event was an epic fail, but I still think there is enough good stuff to give this a solid thumbs up."

Scott Keith of Inside Pulse wrote "Sabu’s spotty tendencies being reigned in and a good Shane v. Cactus showdown make for an entertaining show overall, although the first hour or so is strictly fast-forward material."

The Skinny of Inside Pulse wrote "They fit most of the garbage into the first hour. Add in some Taz for violence, some JT Smith for comedy and it’s bearable. The Shane/Foley and Sabu/Scorpio matches are exceptionally good, although the main event was very lack luster." He considered the World Television Championship match to be the match of the night and he further stated "While the first hour isn’t that great, the second hour makes up for it with two classics, followed by a quick drunken brawl to close the show".

Wrestling 20 Years Ago staff gave a score rating of 7 out of 10, writing "Pillman debut, Scorpio/Sabu, Douglas – the rest is probably skippable, but as ECW stuff goes these three are both absolutely must see."

== Aftermath ==
CyberSlam aired in syndication on the February 20, February 27 and March 5 episodes of Hardcore TV.

Mikey Whipwreck's betrayal of Cactus Jack led to the two facing each other in Jack's farewell match at Big Ass Extreme Bash on March 9, which Jack won. After the match, Jack hugged Whipwreck and left ECW to join World Wrestling Federation.

Raven and The Sandman continued their feud over the World Heavyweight Championship as the two wrestled each other in several matches throughout the year until Sandman finally won the title at Ultimate Jeopardy.

2 Cold Scorpio defended the World Television Championship against Sabu in a rematch at Big Ass Extreme Bash on March 8.

The Eliminators and The Pitbulls continued their feud as Pitbulls began pursuing the World Tag Team Championship. The two teams competed in a match for the titles at the Big Ass Extreme Bash show on March 8, where Eliminators retained the titles.

== Results ==
No.	Results	Stipulations	Times
1	The Bad Crew (Dog and Rose) and Judge Dredd defeated Dino Sendoff, Don E. Allen and the Dirt Bike Kid by pinfall	Six-man tag team match	2:03
2	Spiros Greco defeated El Puerto Riqueño by pinfall	Singles match	4:27
3	Taz (with Bill Alfonso) defeated Joel Hartgood by submission	Singles match	1:54
4	Buh Buh Ray Dudley (with Big Dick Dudley, Chubby Dudley, Dances with Dudley and Sign Guy Dudley) defeated Mr. Hughes by pinfall	Singles match	0:36
5	The Bruise Brothers (Don Bruise and Ron Bruise) defeated the Headhunters (Headhunter A and Headhunter B) by pinfall	Tag team match	3:54
6	J.T. Smith defeated Axl Rotten by pinfall	Singles match	6:12
7	Francine and The Pitbulls (Pitbull #1 and Pitbull #2) defeated Stevie Richards and the Eliminators (Kronus and Saturn) by pinfall	Dog collar match	14:03
8	2 Cold Scorpio (c) vs. Sabu ended in a time limit draw	Singles match for the ECW World Television Championship	30:00
9	Shane Douglas defeated Cactus Jack by pinfall	Singles match	15:37
10	Raven (c) (with Kimona Wanalaya, Stevie Richards and the Blue Meanie) defeated the Sandman (with Missy Hyatt) by pinfall	Singles match for the ECW World Heavyweight Championship	8:21
(c) / – the champion(s) heading into the match
