= Alexander Zass =

Russian strongman and professional wrestler

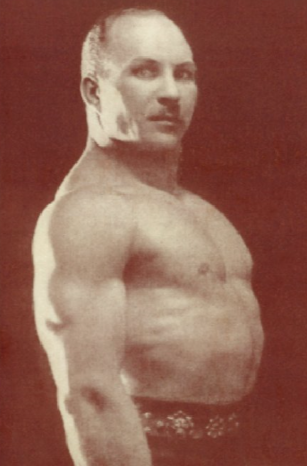

Personal information
- Born: 6 March 1888 Vilnius, Vilna Governorate, Russian Empire
- Died: 26 September 1962 (aged 74)

Professional wrestling career
- Ring name(s): The Amazing Samson; Iron Samson; Samson
- Billed height: 5'6 (168cm)
- Billed weight: 176 lb (80 kg)

Alexander Ivanovich Zass (6 March 1888 – 26 September 1962) was a Russian strongman, professional wrestler, and animal trainer. He was better known by his stage names, The Amazing Samson, Iron Samson, or simply Samson, Zass has been credited as the "first Russian champion in weightlifting in the pre-Revolutionary era".

== Biography ==
Zass was born on 6 March 1888 in Vilnius, then part of the Russian Empire. While a young man, Zass' strength training included "bending green branches".

During First World War, Zass served in the Russian army, fighting against the Austrians. He was taken as a prisoner of war four times, but managed to escape each time. As a prisoner, he pushed and pulled his cell bars as part of strength training, which was cited as an example of the effectiveness of isometrics. At least one of his escapes involved him 'breaking chains and bending bars'. He went on to promote the use of isometric exercises.

Following the war, Zass joined a circus to perform feats of strength, touring internationally. It has been claimed that Zass was a spy and secret agent working for Russian military intelligence, using his circus travelling as cover. In 1926, his autobiography, The Amazing Samson: as Told by Himself, was published.

His first wife, Blanche M M Zass, died on 22 August 1928 in Forest Hill Kent aged 19. He was still performing as a strongman in the 1930s.

From the 1930s until his death, Zass lived in Hockley, Essex, staying in a bungalow along with other former circus acts. He died in 1962; after a dawn funeral (a circus tradition), he was buried in the parish church of St Peter & St Paul in Hockley, England. The inscription on the grave is: [three lines of Cyrillic script, translated as: Dear Shura [pet name for Alexander] You are always with us Sister Nadya Zass, nephew Yura] / ALEXANDER ZASS (Samson) / The worlds strongest man / died 26th Sept 1962 aged 74. His estate was valued at £2263 2s.

He was honoured with a statue in a museum in Orenburg, Russia.

== Strength feats ==
Zass has been credited with various feats of strength:

- Carrying his injured horse in wartime
- Carrying on his shoulders two lions as part of his circus act
- Carrying on his shoulders simultaneously a grand piano, a pianist and a dancer.
- Catching a woman fired from a cannon
- Suspending a piano from his teeth
- Bending with his bare hands an iron bar 5 inches long and 0.625 inches square into a U-shape
- Being able to "pound a 5-inch spike through a 2 inch thick plank using only the palm of his bare hand"
