= ECW Just Another Night =

1996 Extreme Championship Wrestling live event

Just Another Night
- Promotion: Extreme Championship Wrestling
- Date: February 23, 1996
- City: Glenolden, Pennsylvania, US
- Venue: Briarcliffe Fieldhouse
- Attendance: 493

Event chronology
← Previous; CyberSlam	Next → Big Ass Extreme Bash

Just Another Night was a professional wrestling live event produced by Extreme Championship Wrestling (ECW) on February 23, 1996. The event was held in the Briarcliffe Fieldhouse in Glenolden, Pennsylvania in the United States. A "fan cam" recording of the event was released on DVD by RF Video, while the event was later made available for streaming on the WWE Network. The bout between Bam Bam Bigelow and Cactus Jack was also included on the 2015 compilation DVD ECW Unreleased Vol. 3.

== Event ==
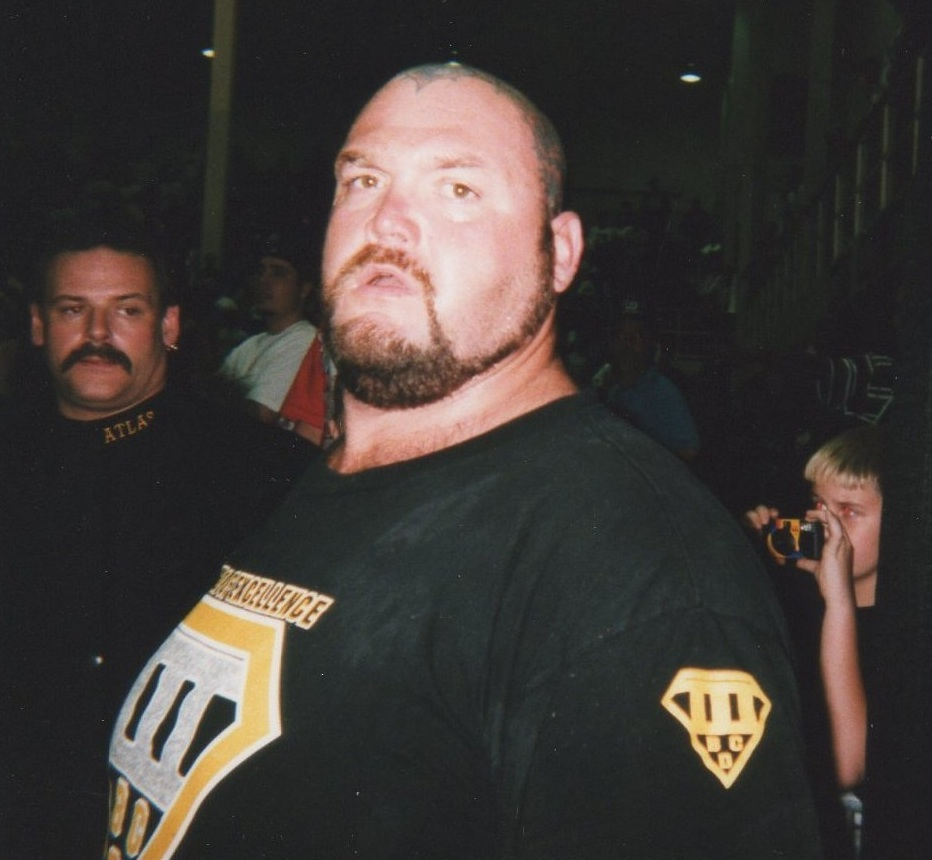
Bam Bam Bigelow wrestled his first match for Extreme Championship Wrestling at Just Another Night.

The event was attended by 493 people.

The opening bout was a tag team match pitting the Bad Crew against Joel Hartgood and J.T. Smith. At the outset of the match, Smith gave Hartgood a series of chair shots and then walked out on him, leaving him outnumbered by the Bad Crew. The Bad Crew went on to win the bout, pinning Hartgood after giving him a powerbomb followed by a diving splash. After the match, the Sandman came to the ring and hit the Bad Crew and Hartgood with his Singapore cane.

The second bout was another tag team match, this one pitting the Pitbulls against Stevie Richards and the Blue Meanie. The match was won by the Pitbulls, who pinned the Blue Meanie following a superbomb.

The third bout was a singles match between ECW commissioner Tod Gordon and manager Bill Alfonso. Alfonso won the bout by pinfall after his client, Taz, hit Gordon. After the match, Alfonso and Taz attempted to give Gordon a chair shot but were driven off by Bam Bam Bigelow.

The fourth bout was a singles match between Mikey Whipwreck and El Puerto Riqueño. The match was won by Whipwreck.

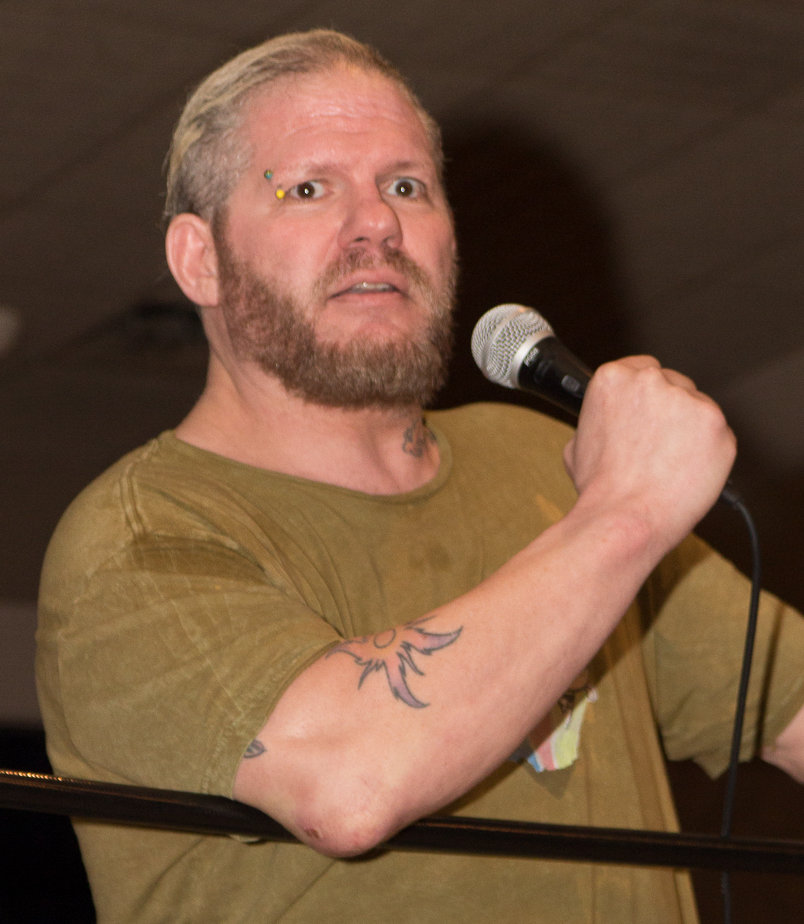
ECW World Heavyweight Champion Raven successfully defended his title at Just Another Night.

The fifth bout was scheduled to be ECW World Tag Team Champions the Eliminators defending their titles against the Dudley Brothers. Before the match, The Eliminators performed Total Elimination on Dances with Dudley, injuring him and leaving his partner Buh Buh Ray Dudley outnumbered. After Dudley wrestled alone for several minutes, Hack Meyers came to the ring to replace Dances with Dudley. The Eliminators went on to win the match, pinning Meyers following Total Elimination.

The sixth bout was a singles match between Axl Rotten and the Sandman. The Sandman won the match by pinfall following a diving leg drop.

The seventh bout saw ECW World Television Champion 2 Cold Scorpio defend his title against Sabu in a rematch from Cyberslam. The match ended in a time limit draw after 20 minutes.

The eighth bout was a singles match between Bam Bam Bigelow and Cactus Jack. At the time of the match, Cactus Jack would soon leave ECW to join the World Wrestling Federation, while Bigelow had recently left the Federation, debuting in ECW earlier that month at Big Apple Blizzard Blast. Bigelow went on to win the match by pinfall following a lariat. After the match, Cactus Jack, Stevie Richards, the Blue Meanie, and Taz attacked Bigelow, with Taz applying the Tazmission to him.

The main event saw ECW World Heavyweight Champion Raven defend his title against Shane Douglas. During the match, Brian Pillman came to ringside disguised as a photographer, then distracted Douglas with repeated camera flashes. Following repeated interference from Raven's Nest, Raven won the bout by pinfall following an Evenflow DDT onto a chair. After the match, Raven's Nest attacked Douglas until The Sandman came to the ring and drove them away, after which Douglas convinced him to form an alliance to take the ECW World Heavyweight Championship away from Raven.

== Results ==
No.	Results	Stipulations	Times
1	The Bad Crew (Dog and Rose) defeated Joel Hartgood and J.T. Smith by pinfall	Tag team match	3:27
2	The Pitbulls (Pitbull #1 and Pitbull #2) (with Francine) defeated Stevie Richards and the Blue Meanie by pinfall	Tag team match	9:07
3	Bill Alfonso (with Taz) defeated Tod Gordon (with Bam Bam Bigelow) by pinfall	Singles match	2:36
4	Mikey Whipwreck defeated El Puerto Riqueño	Singles match	—
5	The Eliminators (Kronus and Saturn) (c) defeated Buh Buh Ray Dudley and Hack Meyers (with Big Dick Dudley, Dances With Dudley, and Sign Guy Dudley) by pinfall	Tag team match for the ECW World Tag Team Championship	6:26
6	The Sandman defeated Axl Rotten by pinfall	Singles match	16:09
7	2 Cold Scorpio vs. Sabu ended in a time limit draw	Singles match for the ECW World Television Championship	20:00
8	Bam Bam Bigelow defeated Cactus Jack (with Stevie Richards and The Blue Meanie) by pinfall	Singles match	3:48
9	Raven (c) (with the Blue Meanie, Kimona Wanalaya, and Stevie Richards) defeated Shane Douglas by pinfall	Singles match for the ECW World Heavyweight Championship	12:31
(c) / – the champion(s) heading into the match
