= Big Apple Blizzard Blast =

1996 Extreme Championship Wrestling live event

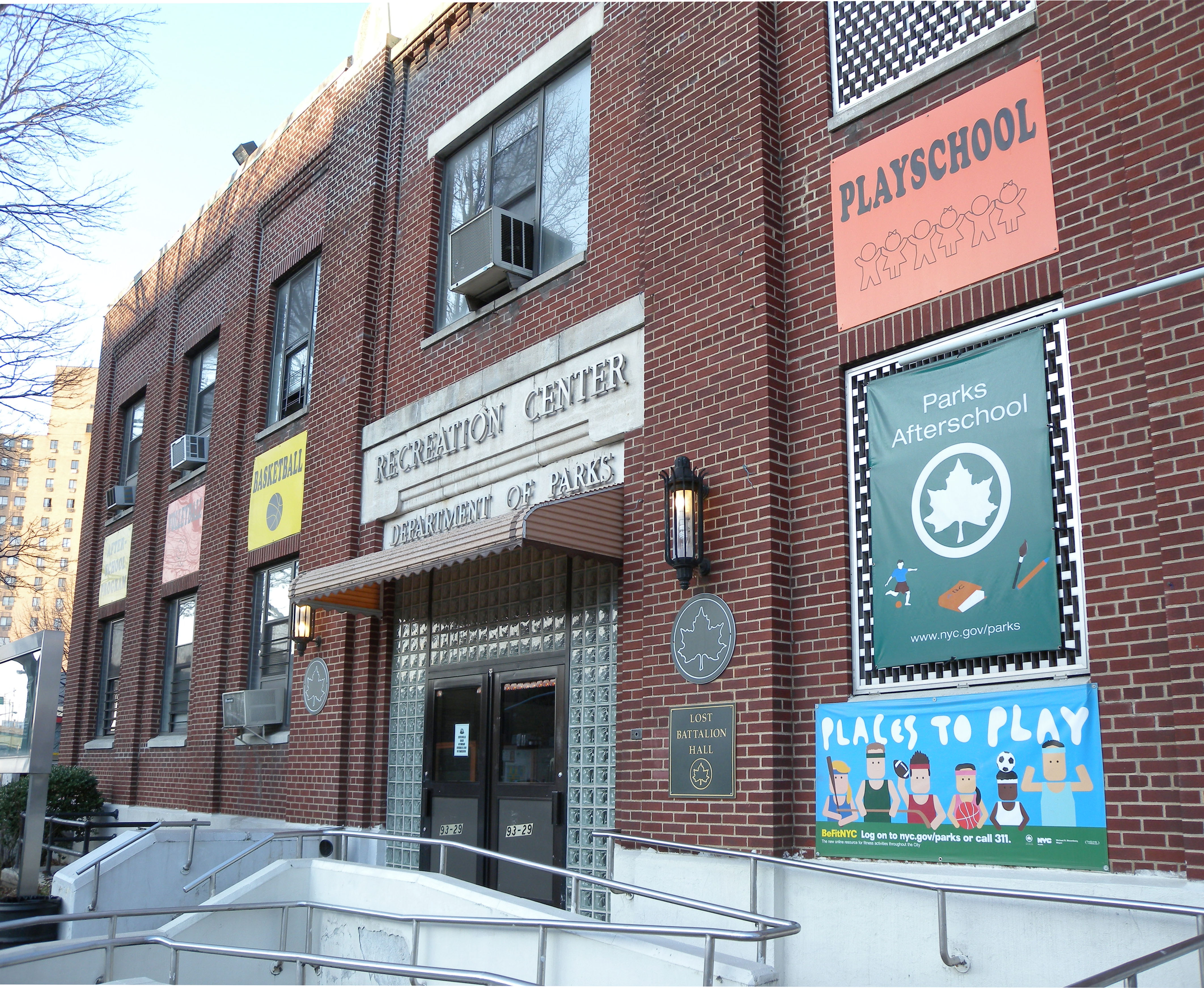
- The Lost Battalion Hall in New York City
- Promotion: Extreme Championship Wrestling
- Date: February 3, 1996 (aired February 6 and 13, 1996)
- City: New York City, New York, US
- Venue: Lost Battalion Hall
- Attendance: c.1,200

Event chronology
← Previous; House Party	Next → CyberSlam

Big Apple Blizzard Blast was a professional wrestling live event produced by Extreme Championship Wrestling (ECW) on February 3, 1996. The event was held in the Lost Battalion Hall in Queens, New York City, New York in the United States.

Excerpts from Big Apple Blizzard Blast aired on episodes #146 and #147 of the syndicated television show ECW Hardcore TV, while the event was released on VHS in 1996. It was made available for streaming on the WWE Network in 2020. Excerpts from the event also featured on A Current Affair, which had a film crew at ringside. Three bouts from the event - 2 Cold Scorpio and the Sandman versus the Gangstas; Shane Douglas and Tommy Dreamer versus Raven and Stevie Richards; and Juventud Guerrera versus Rey Misterio Jr. - appeared on the 2012 compilation DVD ECW Loves New York, while the bout between Guerrera and Misterio Jr. also appeared on the 2007 DVD Rey Mysterio – The Biggest Little Man.

== Event ==
The commentator for Big Apple Blizzard Blast was Joey Styles. The ring announcer was Joel Gertner.

In the opening bout, Taz defeated The Shark Attack Kid in a squash using the Tazmission. Following the match, Taz challenged 911 to come to the ring. ECW commissioner Tod Gordon came out instead of 911, resulting in a brawl between Gordon and Taz's manager Bill Alfonso. After Taz attacked Gordon, Bam Bam Bigelow made his surprise debut, chasing away Taz and Alfonso.

The second bout was a tag team match between the Headhunters and Axl Rotten and El Puerto Riqueño. The match ended when one of the Headhunters pinned El Puerto Ricano following a moonsault.

Sure enough, the crowd was hot when I hit the ring with Mikey to defend the belts. [...] We lost the belts that night, and I turned on poor Mikey, who had just wrestled his heart out - further cementing my new image as a sellout and a scumbag. As a matter of fact, I was showered by chants of "You sold out, you sold out" on my way out of the ring.

— Mick "Cactus Jack" Foley

The third bout saw ECW World Tag Team Champions Cactus Jack and Mikey Whipwreck defend their titles against the Eliminators. The match was marked by dissension between Cactus Jack and Whipwreck, with Cactus Jack - who had signed with the World Wrestling Federation and was facetiously championing hardcore wrestling - repeatedly hindering Whipwreck, including blocking him from applying holds. Whipwreck in turn prevented Cactus Jack from using a broken bottle as a weapon. The match ended when Cactus Jack distracted Whipwreck, enabling the Eliminators to perform Total Elimination on him and pin him. After the match, Cactus Jack turned on Whipwreck, giving him a double arm DDT onto a steel chair.

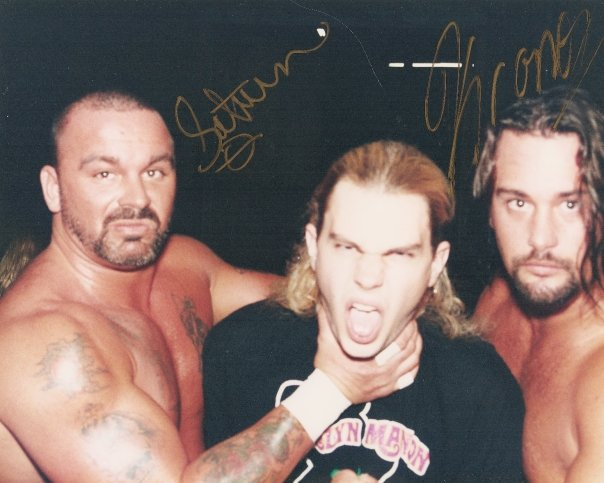
The Eliminators (Saturn (left) and Kronus (right)) won the ECW World Tag Team Championship at Big Apple Blizzard Blast.

Following the match, Francine came to the ring and offered to become the manager of the Eliminators. This was revealed to be a trick, with Francine's clients the Pitbulls attacking the Eliminators, delivering a superbomb to Kronus and choking Saturn with a chain before Francine cut his hair off.

The fourth bout was another tag team match pitting Raven (the then-ECW World Heavyweight Champion) and Stevie Richards against Shane Douglas and Tommy Dreamer in a continuation of the long-running feud between Raven and Dreamer. The match ended when Dreamer's valet Beulah McGillicutty tied a frying pan to his boot and he delivered an enzuigiri to Richards, then pinned him.

The fifth bout saw WWA World Welterweight Champion Rey Misterio Jr. defend his title against the debuting Juventud Guerrera (substituting for Psicosis, who had missed the show). Misterio won a fast-paced lucha libre bout by pinfall after reversing a sitout crucifix powerbomb into a hurricanrana. Following the match, Taz and Bill Alfonso came to the ring, resulting in a confrontation with Misterio that ended with Taz German suplexing Misterio. J.T. Smith then attacked Misterio until being attacked himself by Hack Meyers.

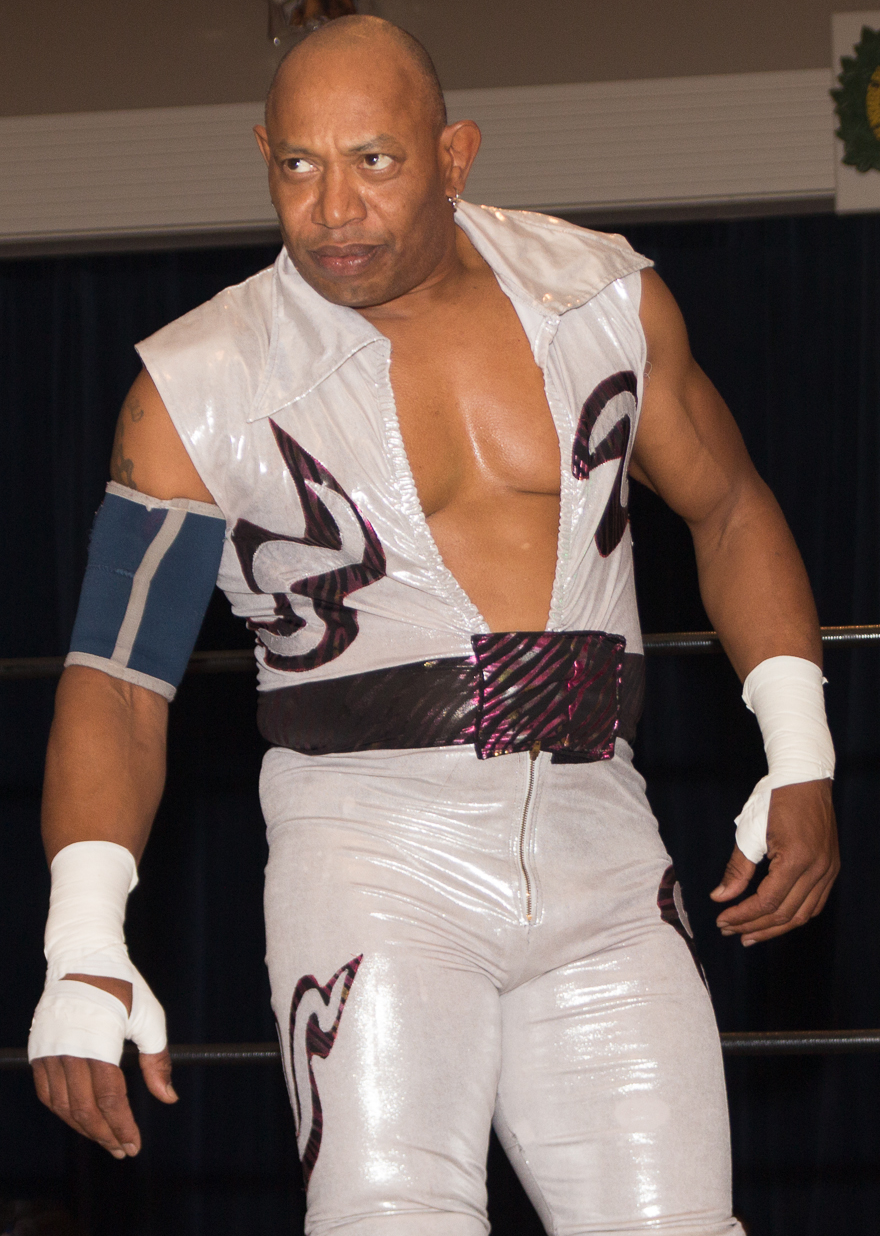
2 Cold Scorpio (top) and the Sandman (bottom) won the main event of Big Apple Extreme Blast.

Woman - the Manager of 2 Cold Scorpio and the Sandman - then came to the ring. Woman, who had signed a contract with rival promotion World Championship Wrestling and had already appeared on WCW Monday Nitro, acknowledged that she was joining WCW and tried to convince announcer Joey Styles and ECW mainstay the Sandman to come to WCW with her. After both men declined, Woman refused to leave the building. 2 Cold Scorpio then came to the ring and carried Woman out of the building, depositing her in a limousine and instructing the chauffeur to "take that bitch to Atlanta!" (the headquarters of WCW).

After Woman had left, the Blue Meanie and Stevie Richards came to the ring to try and convince the Sandman to withdraw from his scheduled match against ECW World Heavyweight Champion Raven at Cyberslam. The Sandman refused and knocked the Blue Meanie unconscious using his Singapore cane, drawing out Raven himself. Stevie Richards then announced that he was suing Missy Hyatt - who had kissed him at Holiday Hell - for sexual harassment (an in-joke referring to Hyatt's legitimate lawsuit against her former employer World Championship Wrestling for sexual harassment). Raven then invited Hyatt to join Raven's Nest, but she refused and instead agreed to become the Sandman's manager.

The sixth bout, which was not included on the VHS, was a tag team match between the Headhunters and the Pitbulls which was won by the Pitbulls.

Paul booked me against RVD and wanted to use the match as our official TV debut. Rob and I had similar styles, similar size, and similar worldwide experience. He'd spent some time overseas and made a name for himself in Japan just as I had. But the match sucked worse than a toothless vampire. We were a step off on everything and there was no sign of the chemistry we'd had the night before. The fans turned on us, chanting "This match sucks," "Please go home", "End this match." Even the dreaded "You fucked up" chant reared its ugly head when I screwed up a simple arm drag.

— Chris Jericho

The seventh bout was a singles match between Chris Jericho and Rob Van Dam. Jericho won the bout by pinfall using a Lionsault. This was Jericho's second match with ECW, and was scheduled to be his first televised match. In what Jericho described as the "Jericho Curse", the match went poorly, with ECW promoter Paul Heyman telling Jericho that the recording of the match was defective as an excuse for not airing it. In 2018, WWE - which acquired the footage following the closure of ECW - added the match to the WWE Network.

The eighth bout was a singles match between Buh Buh Ray Dudley and J.T. Smith. Dudley won the bout in under one minute, pinning Smith following a powerbomb.

The penultimate match was a singles bout between Mr. Hughes and Sabu. Sabu won the match by pinfall following a spinning heel kick using a chair.

The main event of Big Apple Blizzard Blast was a tag team match between The Gangstas and 2 Cold Scorpio and the Sandman. The match ended when 2 Cold Scorpio pinned Mustafa using a roll-up after spraying hair spray in his eyes.

== Results ==
No.	Results	Stipulations	Times
1	Taz (with Bill Alfonso) defeated The Shark Attack Kid by submission	Singles match	3:55
2	The Headhunters (Headhunter A and Headhunter B) (with Damien Kane and Lady Alexandra) defeated Axl Rotten and El Puerto Riqueño by pinfall	Tag team match	6:45
3	The Eliminators (Kronus and Saturn) defeated Cactus Jack and Mikey Whipwreck (c) (with Raven) by pinfall	Tag team match for the ECW World Tag Team Championship	12:10
4	Shane Douglas and Tommy Dreamer (with Beulah McGillicutty) defeated Raven and Stevie Richards (with the Blue Meanie and Kimona Wanalaya) by pinfall	Tag team match	19:34
5	Rey Misterio Jr. (c) defeated Juventud Guerrera by pinfall	Singles match for the WWA World Welterweight Championship	8:46
6	The Pitbulls (Pitbull #1 and Pitbull #2) defeated the Headhunters (Headhunter A and Headhunter B) by pinfall	Tag team match	—
7	Chris Jericho defeated Rob Van Dam by pinfall	Singles match	10:58
8	Buh Buh Ray Dudley (with Big Dick Dudley, Dances with Dudley, and Sign Guy Dudley) defeated J.T. Smith by pinfall	Singles match	0:45
9	Sabu defeated Mr. Hughes by pinfall	Singles match	12:30
10	2 Cold Scorpio and the Sandman defeated the Gangstas (Mustafa and New Jack) by pinfall	Tag team match	8:53
(c) / – the champion(s) heading into the match
