= Bodydonnas =

Professional wrestling tag team

Tag team
- Name: Bodydonnas
- Members: Skip; Zip; Rad Radford
- Manager(s): Sunny; Cloudy / Kloudi / Kloudy
- Billed heights: Skip: 5 ft 8 in (1.73 m); Zip: 5 ft 10 in (1.78 m)
- Combined billed weight: 455 lb (206 kg)
- Debut: May 16, 1995
- Disbanded: September 1996
- Years active: 1995–1996

The Bodydonnas were a professional wrestling tag team in the World Wrestling Federation (WWF) in the mid-1990s, consisting of Chris Candido as Skip, Candido's real-life girlfriend Tammy Lynn Sytch as Sunny, and Tom Prichard as Skip's kayfabe cousin Zip.

== History ==
The Bodydonnas were formed in 1995 in the World Wrestling Federation (WWF) with Skip and Sunny introducing themselves via a series of vignettes. They were fitness fanatics who often made fun of their opponents and the fans. They also demonstrated how fit they were by doing jumping jacks during Skip's matches and performed push ups on fallen opponents.

On the July 9, 1995 episode of WWF Wrestling Challenge, Skip was defeated in a booked loss to longtime jobber Barry Horowitz. He got into a feud with Horowitz and lost several more matches. A subsequent storyline saw the Bodydonnas approached by Rad Radford, who wanted to be a Bodydonna. He teamed with Skip until Sunny fired him after The Smoking Gunns defeated the Bodydonnas on the December 23, 1995 episode of Superstars.

Skip soon got another partner who was an official Bodydonna in Zip (originally Flip), his kayfabe cousin. They won the vacant WWF Tag Team Championship on March 31, 1996 on the WrestleMania XII pre-show. They then feuded with The Godwinns until they dropped the titles to them on May 19. Sunny left the Bodydonnas to follow the gold, becoming the Godwinns' manager until the Godwinns also lost their titles, this time to The Smoking Gunns. Sunny then defected to the Gunns' side because she only wanted to manage champions. Meanwhile, the Bodydonnas announced that they were searching for a new manager. They appeared on WWF television programs urging fans to apply for the position. This storyline culminated in the Bodydonnas "hiring" Cloudy (also spelled Kloudi), who was Candido's friend and wrestler Jimmy Shoulders aka James Haney, dressed as a woman.

In September 1996, Skip was injured and the Bodydonnas disbanded.

== Legacy ==
Skip was released from the WWF in 1996 while out injured. He then went to ECW where he found greater success and reunited with Sunny, now going by her real name Tammy Lynn Sytch. Zip changed gimmicks and became the masked Dr. X as a jobber until 1998 when he became a trainer for the WWF. He was released by the company in 2004. The two met each other in a match in ECW on June 28, 1997 at Orgy of Violence, with Skip winning.

On April 28, 2005 Skip (Chris Candido) died after developing pneumonia as a complication of surgery. His death was initially reported as being caused by a blood clot, but this was corrected by his brother Johnny in a 2016 interview.

Zip made a return to WWE (formerly WWF) in January 2007 as the head trainer for Deep South Wrestling, a development territory for WWE. After DSW shut down later that year, he worked for Florida Championship Wrestling a new development territory for WWE. He was released from WWE in May 2012 before FCW folded in August 2012.

== Championships and accomplishments ==
- World Wrestling Federation
  - WWF Tag Team Championship (1 time)
  - WWF World Tag Team Championship tournament (1996)
