= November to Remember (2000) =

2000 Extreme Championship Wrestling pay-per-view event

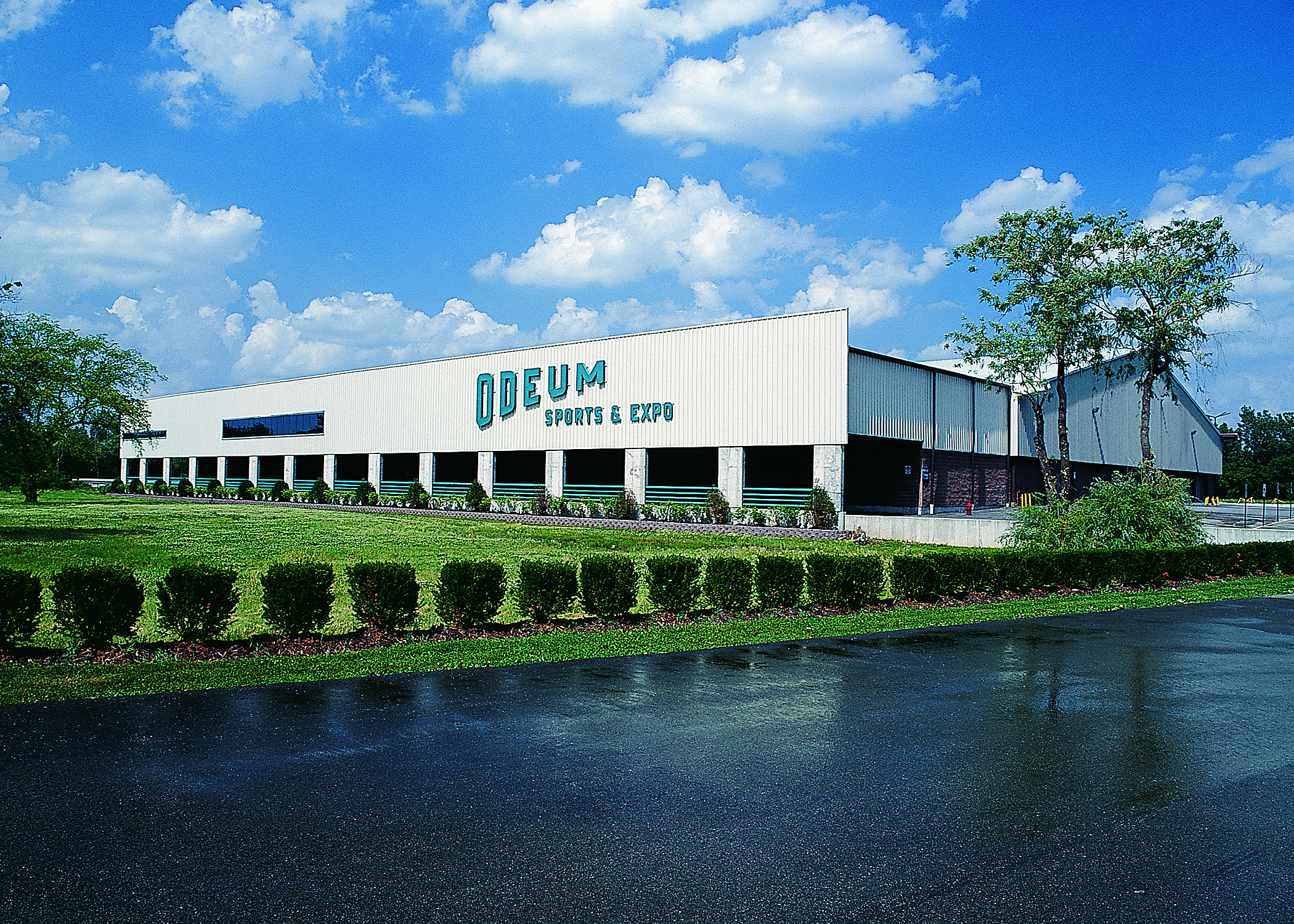
- The Odeum Expo Center.
- Promotion: Extreme Championship Wrestling
- Date: November 5, 2000
- City: Villa Park, Illinois, US
- Venue: Odeum Expo Center
- Attendance: 4,600
- Buy rate: 50,000

Pay-per-view chronology
| ← Previous; Anarchy Rulz | Next → Massacre on 34th Street |

November to Remember chronology
| ← Previous; 1999 | Next → Final |

November to Remember (2000) was the eighth and final November to Remember professional wrestling pay-per-view (PPV) event produced by Extreme Championship Wrestling (ECW). It took place on November 5, 2000, from the Odeum Expo Center in Villa Park, Illinois, US. This was the fourth November to Remember pay-per-view and the ante-penultimate ECW pay-per-view. The commentators for the event were Joey Styles, Joel Gertner and Cyrus.

== Storylines ==
The event featured wrestlers from pre-existing scripted feuds and storylines. Wrestlers portrayed villains, heroes, or less distinguishable characters in the scripted events that built tension and culminated in a wrestling match or series of matches played out on ECW's television programs, Hardcore TV and ECW on TNN.

At Anarchy Rulz, Steve Corino defeated C. W. Anderson to become the #1 contender for the World Heavyweight Championship. Later that night, Jerry Lynn defeated Justin Credible to win the World Heavyweight Championship. On the October 6 episode of ECW on TNN, Lynn cut a promo on his title win until Francine and Credible attacked him. On the October 15 episode of Hardcore TV, Lynn interrupted Credible's promo until Rhino struck Lynn with a Gore and Credible caned Corino. Corino received his title shot against Lynn on the October 22 episode of Hardcore TV until Anderson interrupted the two and demanded a title shot as well, with Lynn then defending the title against the two in a three-way dance and retained the title. A week later on Hardcore TV, it was announced that Lynn would defend the title against Corino, Credible and The Sandman in a Double Jeopardy match at November to Remember. On the November 5 episode of Hardcore TV, Corino and New Jack defeated Credible and Rhino in a tag team match. After the match, Credible and Rhino attacked their opponents until Sandman made the save and offered Corino a toast of beer but Corino slapped it away.

On the October 22 episode of Hardcore TV, it was announced that Super Crazy would make his return from injury to ECW at November to Remember. A week later, C. W. Anderson proclaimed that he would ruin Crazy's comeback at November to Remember.

On the October 29 episode of Hardcore TV, it was announced that Rhino would defend the World Television Championship against New Jack at November to Remember.

At Anarchy Rulz, Da Baldies (Angel and Tony DeVito) defeated Balls Mahoney and Chilly Willy in a tag team match. On the October 15 episode of Hardcore TV, Da Baldies attacked Willy in New York. The following week on Hardcore TV, The F.B.I. (Little Guido and Tony Mamaluke) attacked Mahoney during his match against Yoshihiro Tajiri until Willy made the save only for Da Baldies to come back and attack him again. Da Baldies then put Mahoney through a flaming table with a double powerbomb. As a result, Commissioner Spike Dudley announced that Da Baldies would face Mahoney and Willy in a flaming tables match at November to Remember.

== Event ==
=== Preliminary matches ===
As the event kicked off, Simon Diamond and Johnny Swinger interrupted the introduction of the event by Joey Styles and Joel Gertner on not mentioning that Diamond was responsible for ending Tommy Dreamer's career and then he punched Gertner until Dreamer made the rescue, only to get attacked by C. W. Anderson. The Bad Street Boys (Christian York and Joey Matthews) then made the save, leading to the two competing against Diamond and Swinger in a match York and Matthews gained momentum until Anderson interfered and nailed an Anderson Spinebuster to Diamond, leading to Problem Solver to York. Anderson, Diamond and Swinger continued to assault Bad Street Boys after the match until Kid Kash made the save and began a match with Anderson. Kash hit a tornado DDT to win the match.

Next, Danny Doring and Roadkill took on Hot Commodity (Chris Hamrick, Julio Dinero and E.Z. Money) in a handicap match. Hot Commodity gained advantage due to their strength until Spike Dudley showed up as Doring and Roadkill's third partner to make it an evenly contested six-man tag team match. Dudley and Roadkill delivered a Buggy Bang and Acid Drop combination on Hamrick for the win.

Next, Nova took on his former tag team partner Chris Chetti in a loser leaves town match. Despite repeated interference by Lou E. Dangerously, Nova nailed a Kryptonite Krunch from the top rope on Chetti to win the match, forcing Chetti to leave ECW.

The following match was a flaming tables match, pitting the team of Balls Mahoney and Chilly Willy against Da Baldies (Angel and Tony DeVito). After a back and forth match, Mahoney powerbombed Angel through a flaming table for the victory.

This was followed by the first title match of the night in which Rhino defended his World Television Championship against New Jack. Jack hit Rhino with a guitar but it did not affect Rhino, who then executed a Gore to Jack to retain the title.

In the penultimate match, The F.B.I. (Little Guido and Tony Mamaluke) defended the World Tag Team Championship against the Unholy Alliance (Mikey Whipwreck and Yoshihiro Tajiri). Whipwreck executed a Whippersnapper to Mamaluke from the top rope but injured his shoulder in the process and then Super Crazy returned to ECW to substitute for Whipwreck as Tajiri's tag team partner. Crazy brawled with Mamaluke outside the ring until Sal E. Graziano got involved, leading to Crazy executing a Moonsault onto Graziano from the top of a pay-per-view board in the audience section. Tajiri then applied a Tarantula on Mamaluke in the ring and Guido hit a bulldog to Tajiri to retain the titles.

=== Main event match ===
Jerry Lynn defended the World Heavyweight Championship against The Sandman, Justin Credible and Steve Corino in a Double Jeopardy match. Corino and Credible hit a double superkick to Sandman, followed by Credible delivering a That's Incredible to Lynn and Corino hitting an Old School Expulsion to Sandman at the same time and then both men pinned Lynn and Sandman simultaneously to eliminate them. Dawn Marie turned on Corino by low blowing him and Jack Victory and then she left. Credible hit Corino with Singapore cane but Corino still managed to execute an Old School Kick on Credible to win the title.

== Reception ==
Arnold Furious of Wrestling Recaps wrote "Far too much crap, not enough good stuff. But on the upside the tag title match was good and there were a lot of entertaining spotty matches on the 1st half of the card. I think the problem ECW was suffering from was repetition coupled with weak main events. They didn’t have any big name stars left after WCW and the WWF had done plundering their ranks. It’s this that led to their eventual demise (that and lack of backing). So the shows were starting to wind down and fizzle out around the end of 2000, which was too bad. ECW was a great company while it lasted."

== Aftermath ==
The feud between the new World Heavyweight Champion Steve Corino, former champion Jerry Lynn and Justin Credible continued as the three competed in a three-way dance for the title at Massacre on 34th Street.

Bad Street Boys began feuding with Simon and Swinger after the event, leading to a rematch between the two teams at Massacre on 34th Street.

Super Crazy continued his alliance with the Unholy Alliance as the trio took on Hot Commodity on the November 19 episode of Hardcore TV, where Unholy Alliance turned on Crazy, culminating in Tajiri beating Crazy with the help of Whipwreck. Crazy teamed with Kid Kash to take on the Unholy Alliance at Massacre on 34th Street.

== Results ==
| No. | Results | Stipulations | Times |
|---|---|---|---|
| 1 | Simon Diamond and Johnny Swinger defeated The Bad Street Boys (Christian York and Joey Matthews) | Tag team match | 5:21 |
| 2 | Kid Kash defeated C. W. Anderson | Singles match | 10:47 |
| 3 | Spike Dudley, Danny Doring and Roadkill defeated Hot Commodity (Chris Hamrick, Julio Dinero and E.Z. Money) (with Elektra) | Six-man tag team match | 8:23 |
| 4 | Nova defeated Chris Chetti (with Lou E. Dangerously) | Loser Leaves Town match | 9:48 |
| 5 | Balls Mahoney and Chilly Willy defeated Da Baldies (Angel and Tony DeVito) | Flaming tables match | 12:17 |
| 6 | Rhino (c) defeated New Jack | Singles match for the ECW World Television Championship | 7:56 |
| 7 | The F.B.I. (Little Guido and Tony Mamaluke) (c) (with Sal E. Graziano) defeated the Unholy Alliance (Mikey Whipwreck and Yoshihiro Tajiri) (with The Sinister Minister) | Tag team match for the ECW World Tag Team Championship | 15:47 |
| 8 | Steve Corino (with Jack Victory and Dawn Marie) defeated Justin Credible (with Francine), The Sandman and Jerry Lynn (c) | Double Jeopardy match for the ECW World Heavyweight Championship | 24:21 |
(c) / – the champion(s) heading into the match

=== Double Jeopardy eliminations ===
| Elimination no. | Wrestler | Eliminated by | Elimination move | Time |
|---|---|---|---|---|
| 1 | The Sandman | Steve Corino | Old School Expulsion | 16:21 |
| 2 | Jerry Lynn | Justin Credible | That's Incredible | 16:21 |
| 3 | Justin Credible | Steve Corino | Old School Kick | 24:07 |
| Winner: | Steve Corino | | | |

== See also ==
- 2000 in professional wrestling
