= Pro-Pain Pro Wrestling =

Professional wrestling promotion based in Pennsylvania, US

- Acronym: 3PW
- Founded: February 15, 2002
- Defunct: June 18, 2005
- Style: Hardcore wrestling
- Headquarters: Philadelphia, Pennsylvania
- Founder(s): The Blue Meanie; Jasmin St. Claire
- Owner(s): The Blue Meanie; Jasmin St. Claire
- Predecessor: Extreme Championship Wrestling
- Website: 3PWrestling.com

Pro-Pain Pro Wrestling, or 3PW, was a hardcore professional wrestling promotion based in Philadelphia, Pennsylvania. Considered an attempt at reviving Extreme Championship Wrestling (ECW), it ran many shows from the former ECW Arena.

The promotion was founded in 2002 by ECW alumni Jasmin St. Claire and Brian "The Blue Meanie" Heffron, later being joined by ECW founder Tod Gordon. Many former ECW veterans, such as Raven, The Sandman, Al Snow and Sabu, made up the roster of the promotion. The promotion closed in 2005 after encountering financial difficulties.

== History ==
The promotion was founded by Jasmin St. Claire and Brian "The Blue Meanie" Heffron and they were later joined by former Extreme Championship Wrestling promoter Tod Gordon. In the beginning, 3PW brought in wrestling greats like Dusty Rhodes, Terry Funk, Abdullah The Butcher and Bam Bam Bigelow to add to the roster. The first 3PW shows ran at the ECW Arena, but when XPW Owner Rob Black signed an exclusive lease to the arena, 3PW moved to The Electric Factory.

In 2004, 3PW had a show featuring a Blue World Order reunion with Blue Meanie and Stevie Richards. The next month, 3PW hosted an NWA Florida X Division Championship match between Roderick Strong and Mikey Batts.

In December 2004, however, problems began to surface. 3PW booker Tod Gordon resigned, walking out during a 3PW event following an argument with 3PW officials when there was apparently no money to pay wrestlers, security and other staff for the event. In April, Jasmin St. Claire was officially replaced as CEO by Richard McDonald. Rockin' Rebel took over as booker, but he and the Blue Meanie soon became involved in a business dispute with Pro Wrestling Unplugged owners Johnny Kashmere and Trent Acid. When St. Claire stopped receiving her royalty checks, she responded by putting the promotion up for sale in a one-day auction on eBay although, no one responded to the $180,000 asking price. Blue Meanie attempted to resurrect the company, but was unable to find an investor. The company's final show was on June 18, 2005. In 2007 Force Entertainment began Professionally repacking and distributing 3PW Events throughout Australia commercially and through the companies' websites, as such the DVD releases started turning up in supermarkets, video stores, and retail outlets.

== Alumni ==
=== Male wrestlers ===
Birth name:	Ring name(s):	Tenure:	Notes
Don Adelberg	Don E. Allen	2004–2005	
Louis Almodovar	Damian Adams	2002–2005	
Michael Altieri	Mikey Batts	2004	
Nana Bandoh	Prince Nana	2003	
Nicholas Berk	Nick Berk	2003	
Scott Bigelow^{†}	Bam Bam Bigelow	2002	
Adam Birch	Joey Matthews	2002–2004	
Julian Bradley	Kris Krude	2005	
Phillip Brooks	CM Punk	2002	
Michael Brown	Dylan Knight / Mike Brown	2002, 2005	
Wagner Brown	Slyk Wagner Brown	2004–2005	
Terry Brunk	Sabu	2002–2004	
Steven Carrasquillo	Monsta Mack	2003–2005	
David Cash	Kid Kash	2002–2003	
Chris Chetti	Chris Chetti	2002–2003	
Scott Colton	Colt Cabana	2002	
Steve Corino	Steve Corino	2002	
John Corson	Zandig	2003	
Daniel Covell	Christopher Daniels	2004–2005	
James Cox	James Storm	2005	
Benito Cuntapay	B-Boy	2005	
Michael Depoli	Amish Roadkill	2002–2005	
Pat DiGiacomo	White Lotus	2002	
Michael Durham^{†}	Johnny Grunge	2002, 2004	
Nelson Erazo	Homicide	2003, 2005	
Thomas Farra	Tommy Suede	2005	
Chris Ford	Crowbar	2002	
Paul Fuchs III^{†}	Paul E. Normous	2002	
Jim Fullington	The Sandman	2002–2004	
Terry Funk	Terry Funk	2003	
Chris Guy	Ace Steel	2002	
Chris Hamrick	Chris Hamrick	2002	
Chris Harris	Chris Harris	2005	
Joshua Harter	Chris Sabin	2004–2005	
Donald Haviland^{†}	Hack Meyers	2002	
Brian Heffron	The Blue Meanie	2002–2005	
Curtis Hennig^{†}	Curt Hennig	2002	
John Jirus	Xavier	2003	
Allen Jones	A.J. Styles	2003–2005	
Matthew Kaye	Matt Striker	2002–2005	
Pat Kenney	Simon Diamond	2004–2005	
Ronnie Killings	Ron Killings	2002	
Ronald Knight	Jason Knight	2002	
Brian Knighton^{†}	Axl Rotten	2002	
Jerry Lawler	Jerry "The King" Lawler	2002–2003	
Scott Levy	Raven	2003–2004	
Chris Lindsey	Roderick Strong	2004	
Dan Lopez	Mafia	2003	
Jerry Lynn	Jerry Lynn	2003–2004	
James Maritato	Little Guido	2002	
Claude Marrow	Ruckus	2003–2005	
Nate Mattson	N8 Mattson	2004–2005	
Michael Mayo Jr.	Mike Kruel	2003–2005	
Angel Medina	Angel	2002	
Gregory Whitmoyer	Greg Matthews	2005	
Dan Morrison	Danny Doring	2002	
Kazushige Nosawa	NOSAWA	2002–2003	
Christopher Parks	Abyss	2005	
Ted Petty^{‡}	Rocco Rock	2002	
Peter Polaco	Justin Credible	2003, 2005	
Matthew Polinsky	Sterling James Keenan	2005	
Matt Prince	Wifebeater	2003–2004	
Jonathan Rechner	Balls Mahoney	2003	
James Reiher	Jimmy Snuka	2003	
Charles Renner	Devon Moore	2005	
Ken Rinehurst	Jack Victory	2003–2004	
Virgil Runnels Jr.^{†}	Dusty Rhodes	2002–2003	
Allen Sarven	Al Snow	2004	
Charles Scaggs	2 Cold Scorpio	2004	
Larry Shreve	Abdullah the Butcher	2002–2003	
Brandon Silvestry	Low Ki	2003–2004	
Jason Spence	Christian York	2002–2003	
Chris Spradlin	Chris Hero	2002	
Dennis Stewart	Derek Wylde	2004	
Robert Strauss	Rob Eckos	2002–2005	
Kevin Sullivan	Kevin Sullivan	2002–2003	
John Toland	Tank Toland	2002	
Eric Tuttle	Towel Boy	2002	
Ephraim Vega	Ricky Vega	2003–2004	
Michael Verdi	Trent Acid	2003, 2005	
Sean Waltman	Syxx-Pac	2002	
William Welch	The Messiah	2005	
Billy Wiles	Bill Wiles / Bilvis Wesley	2002	
Chuck Williams^{†}	Rockin' Rebel	2002–2005	
John Williams	Ian Rotten	2002–2003	
Gary Wolfe	Pitbull #1	2002–2004	
Jerome Young^{†}	New Jack	2002	
Unknown	Caesar Smalls	2005	
Unknown	CJ O'Doyle	2003–2005	
Unknown	Dead Man Walking	2002	
Unknown	Del Tsunami	2002	
Unknown	Dirk Ciglar	2005	
Unknown	Drew Blood	2005	
Unknown	Greg Spitz	2005	
Unknown	Jay Money	2005	
Unknown	Josh Daniels	2002–2003, 2005	
Unknown	Jeff Rocker	2003	
Unknown	JT Moses	2005	
Unknown	Judas Gray	2005	
Unknown	Matt Vandal	2002	
Unknown	Mike Austin	2002	
Unknown	Murder One	2002	
Unknown	Orion	2002	
Unknown	Pierce St. John	2002	
Unknown	Rapid Fire Maldonado	2002	
Unknown	Ric Blade	2002–2003	
Unknown	Robert Pigeon	2002	
Unknown	Ron Zombie	2004–2005	
Unknown	Shawn Donavan	2002	
Unknown	Shirley Doe	2002	
Unknown	Super Hentai	2002	
Unknown	Teddy Fine	2005	

=== Stables and tag teams ===
Tag team/Stable(s)	Members	Tenure(s)
America's Most Wanted	Chris Harris and James Storm	2005
The Bad Breed	Axl Rotten and Ian Rotten	2002
The Bad Street Boys	Christian York and Joey Matthews	2002
Blackball'd	Greg Matthews and The Rockin' Rebel	2005
Da Hit Squad	Monsta Mack and Mafia	2003
Danny Doring and Roadkill	Danny Doring and Roadkill	2002
Notorious Inc.	Devon Moore and Drew Blood	2005
Pitbulls 2004	Gary Wolfe and Mike Kruel	2004
The Primetime Players	Mike Brown and Teddy Fine	2005
The Public Enemy	Johnny Grunge and Rocco Rock	2002

=== Managers and valets ===
Birth name:	Ring name(s):	Tenure:	Notes
Stephanie Bellars	George Frankenstein	2003	
Rhea Calaveras	Jasmin St. Claire	2002–2003	
April Hunter	April Hunter	2004–2005	
Melissa Hiatt	Missy Hyatt	2002–2003	
Jamie Lynn Szantyr	Talia	2004–2005	
Unknown	Diana	2002	
Unknown	Miss Candie	2002	

=== Commentators and interviewers ===
Birth name:	Ring name(s):	Tenure:	Notes
Bill Apter	Bill Apter		

=== Other personnel ===
Birth name:	Ring name(s):	Tenure:	Notes
Rhea Calaveras	Jasmin St. Claire	2002–2003	Promoter
Tod Gordon	Tod Gordon	2002–2004	Booker
Brian Heffron	The Blue Meanie	2002–2005	Promoter

Notes
^{†} Indicates they are deceased.
^{‡} Indicates they died while they were employed with 3PW.

== Championships ==
=== 3PW World Heavyweight Championship ===
Wrestler	Times	Date	Place	Notes
Gary Wolfe	1	August 24, 2002	Philadelphia, PA	Won an 8-man tournament to become the 1st 3PW Champion.
Sabu	1	October 19, 2002	Philadelphia, PA	
Gary Wolfe	2	December 28, 2002	Philadelphia, PA	
Terry Funk	1	June 21, 2003	Philadelphia, PA	
Justin Credible	1	August 16, 2003	Philadelphia, PA	
Raven	1	November 22, 2003	Philadelphia, PA	
Joey Matthews	1	April 17, 2004	Philadelphia, PA	
Christopher Daniels	1	August 21, 2004	Philadelphia, PA	
Slyk Wagner Brown	1	February 19, 2005	Philadelphia, PA	
Amish Roadkill	1	May 21, 2005	Philadelphia, PA	
Titles became defunct when the promotion closed down.

=== 3PW Tag Team Championship ===
Wrestler	Times	Date	Place	Notes
Slyk Wagner Brown & April Hunter	1	August 21, 2004	Philadelphia, PA	Won a battle royal to become 1st champions.
Pitbulls 2004 (Gary Wolfe & Mike Kruel)	1	October 16, 2004	Philadelphia, PA	
Wolfe was stripped of the title due to a backstage incident.
Mike Kruel & Simon Diamond	1	February 19, 2005	Philadelphia, PA	Diamond was awarded the title to replace Wolfe
Title vacated on March 29, 2005 when Kruel left 3PW.
Blackball'd (Rockin' Rebel & Greg Matthews)		May 21, 2005		Won a battle royal to win the vacant titles.
Titles became defunct when the promotion closed down.
