= Anarchy Rulz (2000) =

2000 Extreme Championship Wrestling pay-per-view event

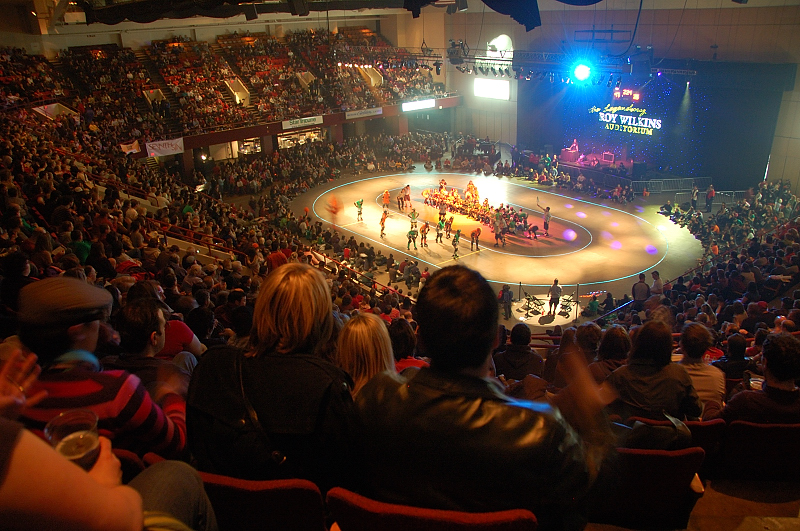
- The Roy Wilkins Auditorium.
- Promotion: Extreme Championship Wrestling
- Date: October 1, 2000
- City: Saint Paul, Minnesota
- Venue: Roy Wilkins Auditorium
- Attendance: 4,600
- Buy rate: 55,000

Pay-per-view chronology
← Previous; Heat Wave	Next → November to Remember

Anarchy Rulz chronology
← Previous; 1999	Next → final

Anarchy Rulz (2000) was the second and final Anarchy Rulz professional wrestling pay-per-view (PPV) event produced by Extreme Championship Wrestling (ECW). It took place on October 1, 2000, from the Roy Wilkins Auditorium in Saint Paul, Minnesota.

== Event ==
=== Pre-show ===
Before the show aired live on pay-per-view, Nova and Bilvis Wesley competed in a match. Nova delivered a Kryptonite Krunch to Wesley for the win. The match aired on the final episode of ECW on TNN on October 6.

=== Preliminary matches ===
The event kicked off with a tag team match between The Bad Street Boys (Christian York and Joey Matthews) and the team of Danny Doring and Roadkill. Doring and Roadkill delivered a Buggy Bang to York for the win. After the match, both teams shook hands with each other until Simon and Swinger came to attack both men with chairs and delivered a Problem Solver to Doring.

After the match, Cyrus and Joel Gertner confronted each other and then Cyrus brought in Hot Commodity (E. Z. Money, Julio Dinero and Chris Hamrick) to attack Gertner but Commissioner Spike Dudley prevented the assault by making a match between Kid Kash and E. Z. Money, which stipulated that if Money won, then Cyrus would not have to wrestle Gertner. Kash executed a Money Maker on E. Z. Money but Elektra distracted the referee, allowing Hot Commodity to triple team Kash. Hamrick nailed a Confederate Crunch to Kash and Money covered Kash for the pinfall but Kash kicked out at two count. Money then attempted to hit a superbomb but Kash reversed it into a hurricanrana for the win. After the match, Hot Commodity attacked Kash until Spike Dudley and The Sandman made the save. This led to the next match between Cyrus and Gertner. Sandman spit beer in Cyrus' eyes and Gertner pinned him with a roll-up.

Next, Balls Mahoney and Chilly Willy competed against Da Baldies (Angel and Tony DeVito). Baldies hit Mahoney and Willy with multiple chair shots for the win. After the match, Lou E. Dangerously attacked Joel Gertner at the announce table and Cyrus replaced Gertner on commentary with Joey Styles.

Next, Steve Corino competed against C. W. Anderson in a number one contender's match, with the winner receiving a shot at the ECW World Heavyweight Championship at November to Remember. After multiple interferences by Corino and Anderson's managers, Corino managed to deliver an Old School Expulsion to Anderson for the win.

Later, The F.B.I. (Little Guido and Tony Mamaluke) defended the World Tag Team Championship against the Unholy Alliance (Mikey Whipwreck and Yoshihiro Tajiri). Sal E. Graziano interfered in the match by tossing the title belt to Mamaluke and Tajiri took him out with a springboard moonsault. Whipwreck attempted to deliver a Whippersnapper to Mamaluke from the top rope but Guido hit him with the title belt and executed a Kiss of Death to retain the titles.

Rhino defended the World Television Championship against Rob Van Dam in the penultimate match. Rhino hit a Gore and a Rhino Spike to RVD on a table outside the ring to get a near-fall and then Bill Alfonso got involved as he handed a chair to RVD, who delivered a Van Daminator to Rhino and both men were down. RVD attempted to nail a Van Terminator to Rhino but Justin Credible interfered and hit him with a cane. RVD still managed to deliver a Van Terminator to Rhino but Rhino pulled Alfonso in the way, who got hit with the move. Rhino then struck RVD with a Gore onto a table in the corner followed by a Rhino Spike on a chair to retain the title with referee Danny Daniels making a fast count.

=== Main event match ===
Justin Credible defended the World Heavyweight Championship against Jerry Lynn in the main event. Credible superkicked the referee to knock him out and Danny Daniels replaced him in the match and began officiating in favor of Credible. As a result, Lynn tried to deliver a cradle piledriver to Daniels but Credible and Francine made the save. Daniels then nailed Lynn with a kendo stick, allowing Credible to deliver a That's Incredible on Lynn. He covered him for the pinfall but New Jack broke the pin. Jack attacked Daniels but Credible hit him with a cane. Lynn attempted to hit Credible's own That's Incredible on Credible but Credible reversed it into his own until Lynn reversed it into a cradle piledriver to win the title.

== Reception ==
Arnold Furious of Wrestling Recaps wrote "Some of it was very good, some of it not so good. Still the crowd warmed towards the whole card so that gives it the eventual thumbs up." According to him, the match between Kid Kash and E. Z. Money was the "show stealer", while considering the opening match and the three-way dance to be the second and third best matches of the show.

According to Scott Keith of 411Mania, "Well, nothing was too horrible, and the good was all solid, but this company has to do something about its own promotional tactics if it's gonna survive."

Kevin Pantoja of 411Mania gave Anarchy Rulz a rating of 7.5, writing "One of the better ECW Pay-Per-Views that I’ve reviewed. Of the eight matches, only two are bad. The Baldies tag and Gertner/Cyrus, but at least that was short and did its job. The last two matches were disappointing but still pretty good. The keys to this show are the opener, Tag Team Title match, number one contender's match and Kash/Money but the real star is the red hot crowd that pretty much never lets up. Sometimes ECW shows don't hold up that well, but this one did so. I recommend giving it a viewing."

== Results ==
No.	Results	Stipulations	Times
1^{D}	Nova defeated Bilvis Wesley	Singles match	—
2	Danny Doring and Roadkill defeated The Bad Street Boys (Christian York and Joey Matthews)	Tag team match	7:14
3	Kid Kash (with Joel Gertner) defeated E. Z. Money (with Cyrus, Elektra, Julio Dinero and Chris Hamrick)	Singles match	9:39
4	Joel Gertner defeated Cyrus	Singles match	2:34
5	Da Baldies (Angel and Tony DeVito) defeated Balls Mahoney and Chilly Willy	Tag team match	7:39
6	Steve Corino (with Jack Victory) defeated C. W. Anderson	Singles match to determine the #1 contender for the ECW World Heavyweight Championship at November to Remember	12:47
7	The F.B.I. (Little Guido and Tony Mamaluke) (c) (with Sal E. Graziano) defeated the Unholy Alliance (Mikey Whipwreck and Yoshihiro Tajiri) (with The Sinister Minister)	Tag team match for the ECW World Tag Team Championship	8:38
8	Rhino (c) defeated Rob Van Dam (with Bill Alfonso)	Singles match for the ECW World Television Championship	12:41
9	Jerry Lynn defeated Justin Credible (c) (with Francine)	Singles match for the ECW World Heavyweight Championship	19:36
(c) / – the champion(s) heading into the match; D / – this was a dark match
