= Anarchy Rulz (1999) =

1999 Extreme Championship Wrestling pay-per-view event

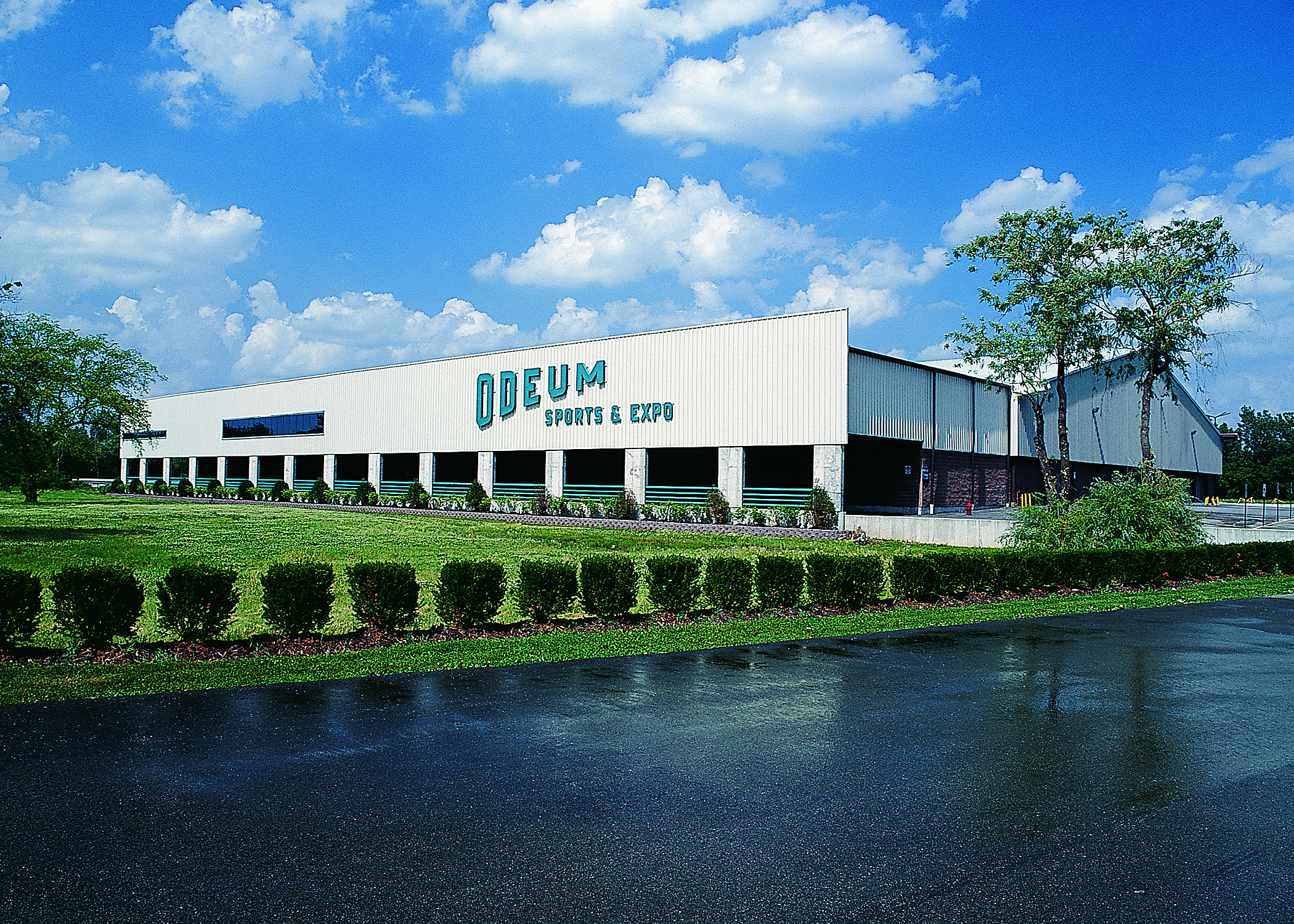
- The Odeum Expo Center.
- Promotion: Extreme Championship Wrestling
- Date: September 19, 1999
- City: Villa Park, Illinois, US
- Venue: Odeum Expo Center
- Attendance: 6,000
- Buy rate: 88,000

Pay-per-view chronology
| ← Previous; Heat Wave | Next → November to Remember |

Anarchy Rulz chronology
| ← Previous first | Next → 2000 |

Anarchy Rulz (1999) was the first Anarchy Rulz professional wrestling pay-per-view (PPV) event produced by Extreme Championship Wrestling (ECW). It took place on September 19, 1999 from the Odeum Expo Center in Villa Park, Illinois. The announcers for the event were Joey Styles and Cyrus.

Rob Van Dam versus Balls Mahoney was included on the 2005 WWE DVD release Rob Van Dam: One of a Kind.

Rob Van Dam defended the ECW World Television Championship against Balls Mahoney in the main event, where he was originally supposed to defend the title against Johnny Smith but Smith was attacked and replaced by Mahoney before the match. The event also featured Tommy Dreamer and Raven retaining the ECW World Tag Team Championship against Rhino and Steve Corino and two three-way dance matches; the first saw Yoshihiro Tajiri defeat Super Crazy and Little Guido and the second featured Mike Awesome defeating champion Taz and Masato Tanaka to win the ECW World Heavyweight Championship in a match originally scheduled to be a one-on-one contest between Taz and Tanaka for the title.

== Event ==
Before the event aired live on pay-per-view, Danny Doring and Roadkill defeated Billy Wiles and C. W. Anderson in a tag team match.

=== Preliminary matches ===
The event kicked off with a match between Jerry Lynn and Lance Storm. Lynn hit a diving hurricanrana but his injured ribs gave up and Storm hit a knee in Lynn's ribs and pinned him with an inside cradle for the win.

After the match, Simon Diamond cut a promo, bringing out Tom Marquez, the newest graduate of House of Hardcore. Jazz interrupted him and then Diamond insulted Jazz, leading to a match between Jazz and Marquez. Jazz nailed a Jazz Stinger to Marquez for the win. Diamond attacked Jazz after the match and Tony DeVito joined Diamond in the assault. Chris Chetti and Nova made the save, leading to them facing Diamond and DeVito in a tag team match. Danny Doring and Roadkill interrupted the match by attacking the competitors, resulting in the match ending in a no contest. A bunch of wrestlers tried to stop Roadkill and a brawl occurred until New Jack brought his trashcan of weapons and attacked everyone with the weapons.

Next, Super Crazy, Yoshihiro Tajiri and Little Guido competed in a Three-Way Dance. Crazy eliminated Guido by hitting a Moonsault. The action continued between Crazy and Tajiri. Tajiri blocked Crazy's triple moonsault with a kick to the face and hit a brainbuster for the win.

Next, Sabu took on Justin Credible. After multiple interference by Bill Alfonso and Jason, Credible nailed a That's Incredible to Sabu on a steel chair for the win.

Later, Taz was scheduled to defend the World Heavyweight Championship against Masato Tanaka until Taz spotted Mike Awesome in the crowd and invited him to join the match as the third competitor and begin it as a three-way dance. Tanaka delivered a Roaring Elbow to Taz, followed by Awesome hitting an Awesome Splash on Taz and then both men pinned Taz to eliminate him. Tanaka attempted to drive Awesome through a table with a superplex but Awesome countered it into an Awesome Bomb onto the table to win the title. After the match, Taz handed over the title to Awesome and the three men shook hands with each other.

In the following match, Tommy Dreamer and Raven defended the World Tag Team Championship against Rhino and Steve Corino. Raven and Dreamer hit simultaneous DDTs on Jack Victory and Corino respectively and pinned them to retain the titles. Originally Corino was going to bring in the Insane Clown Posse as a surprise to face Dreamer and Raven. ICP's management pulled them from the show, resulting in the change to the card.

=== Main event matches ===
Rob Van Dam was scheduled to defend the World Television Championship against Johnny Smith in the main event. Before the match, Axl Rotten cut a promo, in which he challenged Mike Awesome to a match for the World Heavyweight Championship but he was interrupted by The Impact Players and Johnny Smith, who attacked Rotten until Balls Mahoney and Spike Dudley made the save for Rotten. Mahoney hit a chair shot to Smith, which took him out and he substituted for Smith against RVD. Mahoney ducked a Van Daminator by RVD and hit him with a chair to cover him for the pinfall but Bill Alfonso broke the pin by hitting Mahoney with the chair. Mahoney went after Alfonso and got distracted, allowing RVD to hit a Van Daminator and a Five-Star Frog Splash on Mahoney to retain the title.

== Reception ==
Arnold Furious of Wrestling Recaps wrote "Simply an incredible 3 hours worth of wrestling. If they'd actually booked matches for Dreamer/Raven v Corino/Rhino and Nova/Chetti v Diamond/partner then we'd be looking at one of the greatest PPV's ever. I can't praise this enough." According to him, the opening match between Lance Storm and Jerry Lynn and the two three-way dance matches were the best matches of the show.

Scott Keith of 411Mania wrote "Two very good matches make it had to pass this one up, but Paul E's other booking is so crack-influenced at times that I have to wonder if he's actively trying to piss off certain portions of his audience."

Kevin Pantoja of 411Mania gave a score rating of 6.5 out of 10 as he wrote, "A good show from ECW with a great opener, two fun three way dances and a decent Television Title match. It's a historic show though as Mike Awesome wins the ECW World Title and wasn't even advertised to be on the show."

== Results ==
| No. | Results | Stipulations | Times |
|---|---|---|---|
| 1^{D} | Danny Doring and Roadkill (with Angelica) defeated Billy Wiles and C. W. Anderson | Tag team match | — |
| 2 | Lance Storm (with Dawn Marie) defeated Jerry Lynn | Singles match | 16:38 |
| 3 | Jazz defeated Tom Marquez (with Simon Diamond) by disqualification | Singles match | 0:58 |
| 4 | Chris Chetti and Nova vs. Simon Diamond and Tony DeVito ended in a no-contest | Tag team match | 3:52 |
| 5 | Yoshihiro Tajiri defeated Super Crazy and Little Guido (with Sal E. Graziano)^{1} | Three-Way Dance | 14:38 |
| 6 | Justin Credible (with Jason) defeated Sabu (with Bill Alfonso) | Singles match | 14:06 |
| 7 | Mike Awesome (with Judge Jeff Jones) defeated Masato Tanaka and Taz (c) | Three-Way Dance for the ECW World Heavyweight Championship^{2} | 13:48 |
| 8 | Tommy Dreamer and Raven (c) (with Francine) defeated Rhino and Steve Corino (with Jack Victory) | Tag team match for the ECW World Tag Team Championship | 3:24 |
| 9 | Rob Van Dam (c) (with Bill Alfonso) defeated Balls Mahoney | Singles match for the ECW World Television Championship | 19:39 |
(c) / – the champion(s) heading into the match; D / – this was a dark match

=== Three-Way Dance eliminations ===
^1

| Elimination no. | Wrestler | Eliminated by | Elimination move | Time |
|---|---|---|---|---|
| 1 | Little Guido | Super Crazy | Moonsault | 09:18 |
| 2 | Super Crazy | Yoshihiro Tajiri | Buzzsaw Kick followed by a running dropkick and a Brainbuster | 14:38 |
| Winner: | Yoshihiro Tajiri | | | |

^2

| Elimination no. | Wrestler | Eliminated by | Elimination move | Time |
|---|---|---|---|---|
| 1 | Taz | Masato Tanaka and Mike Awesome | Roaring Elbow by Tanaka and Awesome Splash by Awesome | 02:01 |
| 2 | Masato Tanaka | Mike Awesome | Awesome Bomb | 13:48 |
| Winner: | Mike Awesome | | | |
