= Rimshot (disambiguation) =

A rimshot is a percussion technique used to produce an accented snare drum backbeat.

Rimshot can also mean:

- Sting (percussion), a short sequence played by a drummer to punctuate a joke
- Rimshot (broadcasting), a radio or television station that attempts to reach a larger media market from a distant location
- Rimshot (basketball), a shot in which the ball hits the rim of the basket
- The Rimshots, an American funk and disco band
