= Chilly Willy (wrestler) =

American professional wrestler

Personal information
- Born: William Jones; September 24, 1969 (age 57) Goldsboro, North Carolina, U.S.

Professional wrestling career
- Ring name: Chilly Willy
- Billed height: 6 ft 0 in (1.83 m)
- Billed weight: 250 lb (110 kg)
- Billed from: "Your hometown"
- Trained by: C. W. Anderson; Gary Tucker; Dan Wright
- Debut: 1997
- Retired: 2009
- Military service
- Allegiance: United States
- Branch: United States Army
- Conflicts: Iraq War
- Awards: Bronze Star Medal; Purple Heart

William Jones (born September 24, 1969) is an American retired professional wrestler and former United States Army soldier, better known by his ring name Chilly Willy. He is best known for his appearances in Extreme Championship Wrestling from 2000 to 2001.

== Professional wrestling career ==
=== Early career (1997-2000) ===
Competing in toughman contests prior to making his professional wrestling debut in 1997, Jones competed in Matt and Jeff Hardy's OMEGA promotion.

=== Extreme Championship Wrestling (2000-2001) ===
Chilly Willy debuted in Extreme Championship Wrestling in early 2000, defeating Scott D'Amore in Toledo, Ohio on February 25, although he later lost matches to The Prodigy and H. C. Loc at ECW on TNN during the next several weeks. After defeating Johnny Swinger on March 24, he began feuding with Swinger over the next few months.

In his first PPV appearance, he defeated Johnny Swinger at Wrestlepalooza 2000 at Family Arena in St. Charles, Missouri on April 16. He would face Swinger in a rematch the following month, defeating him at Hardcore Heaven 2000 at The Rave in Milwaukee, Wisconsin on May 14. During the "Midwest Massacre" tour, he would also score victories over Tony DeVito and E.Z. Money in June.

With Chris Chetti & Nova, Jones beat the F.B.I. (Little Guido, Sal E. Graziano and Tony Mamaluke) at the Century II in Wichita, Kansas on July 1, 2000. Several days later, they defeated the F.B.I. in a rematch on ECW on TNN at the Mid-Hudson Civic Center in Poughkeepsie, New York on July 7. Losing to ECW TV Champion Rhyno on ECW on TNN later that month in Peoria, IL, he teamed with The Sandman to defeat the F.B.I. (Little Guido & Tony Mamaluke) in Huntington, West Virginia on August 4 when Jones pinned Mamaluke. In the following weeks, they also defeated Justin Credible & Rhino several times before losing to them in the opening rounds of a championship tournament for the vacant ECW World Tag Team Championship at the Hammerstein Ballroom in Manhattan, New York on August 25.

Teaming with The Sandman against The Baldies (Tony DeVito & Angel), Jones teamed with Mikey Whipwreck and Balls Mahoney to defeat Johnny Swinger, Simon Diamond and CW Anderson in a 6-man tag team match at the Burt Flickinger Center in Buffalo, New York on September 8. The following night on ECW on TNN, he and Balls Mahoney defeated The Baldies at the Hershey Center in Mississauga, Ontario.

Feuding with The Baldies over the next several weeks, he and Mahoney were defeated by The Baldies in a tag team match at Anarchy Rulz 2000 on October 1 and, with The Sandman and New Jack, defeated Justin Credible and The Baldies on October 12. The following month, he and Mahoney defeated The Baldies in a rematch at November to Remember '00 on November 5 in a Flaming Tables match. During the next two months, he also defeated Tony DeVito and Mike Bell in singles matches. At ECW Guilty As Charged 2001, Balls Mahoney and Chill Willy fought Simon Diamond and Swinger to a no-contest because Rhyno attacked all four wrestlers. This was William's last ECW appearance. After ECW closed, Jones wrestled a couple of dark matches for the World Wrestling Federation in June 2001 and competed in various independent promotions before temporarily leaving wrestling to enlist in the United States Army that same year.

=== Independent circuit (2004-2009) ===
In April 2004, Jones returned from Iraq and decided to return to wrestling. In November 2004, he received a developmental contract with World Wrestling Entertainment and was assigned by WWE to Ohio Valley Wrestling. He would be released from his contract on April 12, 2005.

In April 2007, Jones appeared at EAW (Eastern All-Star Wrestling) located out of Eden NC, Jones was the number one contender for the EAW Heavyweight Championship that was currently being held by "Cowboy" Mike Dalton.

He was until recently the Heavyweight Champion for Gimmicks Only Underground Grappling Entertainment. In August 2007, Jones no-showed two back to back GOUGE events, and had the GOUGE Heavyweight Title stripped from him.

Jones has retired from active competition but has transitioned into a trainer for both mixed martial artists and professional wrestlers at ABI'S MMA School in Goldsboro, North Carolina .

== Military career ==
Jones enlisted in the United States Army shortly after the World Trade Center attacks, and was sent to Iraq in April 2003. Assigned to a special forces unit while serving as an infantryman in Iraq, he was wounded by mortar fire while on a mission and received the Purple Heart and Bronze Star.

== Current wrestling involvement ==
Jones is currently helping out in the Philippine Wrestling Revolution (PWR) and Art of War Wrestling. He offers training and input behind the scenes.

== Championships and accomplishments ==
- GOUGE Wrestling
  - GOUGE Heavyweight Championship (1 time)
- New Dimension Wrestling
  - NDW United States Championship (1 time)
- High Volume Pro Wrestling
  - HVPW Hall of Fame (2017)
- Southern Championship Wrestling
  - SCW Heavyweight Championship (1 time)
  - SCW Brass Knuckles Championship (1 time)
- World Wrestling Organization
  - WWO Rumble Heavyweight Championship (1 time)
