= Bada Bing! =

Fictional strip club

- The Sopranos organization
- The Bada Bing's logo
- First appearance: "Pilot"

In-universe information
- Type: Strip club
- Address: Route 17
- Location: Lodi, New Jersey
- Owner: Silvio Dante
- Purpose: Offices of the DiMeo crime family and legitimate business front

Bada Bing! (often shortened to The Bing) is a fictional strip club from the HBO drama television series The Sopranos. It was a key location for events in the series, named for the catchphrase "bada bing", a phrase popularized by James Caan's character Sonny Corleone in The Godfather. The name was chosen by writer Frank Renzulli, after the proposed name "The Final Lap" was scrapped because a club in Minnesota shared that name. The popularization of the fictional Bada Bing club benefited the real-life go-go bar, Satin Dolls, where scenes were filmed. The Bada Bing is loosely based on Wiggles, a strip club owned by New Jersey mobster Vincent Palermo before it was shut down.

Strippers at the Bada Bing were portrayed by extras including Elektra, Gina Lynn, Justine Noelle, Kelly Madison Kole, Luiza Liccini, Marie Athanasiou, Nadine Marcelletti, Rosie Ciavolino and Sonia Ortega. The "Bada Bing Girls" appeared in a photo spread in the August 2001 issue of Playboy magazine. Michelle Eileen, another frequently portrayed Bada Bing extra, also appeared in Playboy Fall 2002 with photo spreads over 3 separate Playboy Special Edition magazines.

== Use and effect on the series ==
The Bing is owned and chiefly operated by Silvio Dante, Tony Soprano's consigliere, in Lodi, New Jersey. Tony's office is in one of the back rooms of the Bing, and the DiMeo crime family often conduct their business either in the office or at the bar.

The use of Bada Bing as the name of the club and elsewhere in the series popularized the catchphrase such that it was added to the 2003 Oxford English Dictionary as an exclamation to emphasize that something will happen effortlessly and predictably. Bada bing is imitative of the sound of a drumroll or rim shot, or may also derive from the "bada-bing" sound effect that James Caan's character, Sonny Corleone, makes to describe an up-close shooting in The Godfather.

=== Alcohol and nudity ===
Being a topless go-go bar selling alcoholic drinks, Bada Bing represents a deviation from reality insofar as real-world New Jersey state law prohibits topless or nude dancing in establishments that sell alcohol. However, New Jersey strip clubs without liquor licenses may opt to permit patrons to bring in their own alcoholic beverages, while full bars with liquor licenses are allowed to feature non-topless or non-nude go-go dancers (i.e. "bikini bars").

The show frequently used the club for sexposition scenes. Reviewer Paul Levinson described the Bada Bing, and its background of nudity, as a key setting for the series:

The Sopranos's brilliant solution is to situate most of its nudity in the Bada Bing! strip joint run by Tony Soprano's aide-de-camp, Silvio Dante. The setting is a logical place to find Tony and his crew discussing business, and the naked women need no further motivation than they are "dancing" in the club. At Bada Bing!, the nude "dancers" walk in circles around a pole. Bada Bing! is an ideal locale – doing for The Sopranos what the diner did for Seinfeld, and the bar owned by Munch, Meldrick, and Bayliss did for Homicide – but with an explicit sexual energy to whatever story unfolds.

=== Key scenes ===
The Bing is where:

- Tony Soprano and his crew find out Jackie Aprile Sr. has died from his illness. One of the "dancers" (played by Theresa Lynn) vows never to forget where she was the day Jackie died.
- Tony Soprano cancels the hit on Don Hauser, his daughter's soccer coach, and an uncovered statutory rapist.
- Tony and Sil agree to have Richie Aprile killed but are preempted by a deadly domestic dispute involving Richie and Janice.
- Tony Soprano and Paulie Walnuts agree to have Big Pussy whacked if they found out he was wearing a wire for sure.
- Ralph Cifaretto beats his pregnant girlfriend Tracee, a Bing "dancer," to death in the parking lot just outside the building. He gets beaten in turn by Tony for "disrespecting the Bing."
- Johnny Sack informs Tony that he is prepared to reconcile with Ralph following an insult to Sack's wife, in turn allowing Tony to cancel a planned hit on him.
- Christopher Moltisanti threatens Tony with a gun for allegedly having an affair with his fiancée, but he has already emptied his gun of bullets by shooting Tony's old SUV in the parking lot, a burgundy 1998 Chevrolet Suburban, which Tony presumably is back to driving since totaling his black Escalade.
- Tony makes the case for not killing Vito Spatafore over his homosexuality to Silvio and Carlo Gervasi.
- Paulie has a vision of the Virgin Mary hovering over the dance floor, leading him to reconcile with his aunt and adoptive mother Marianucci.
- Silvio Dante is shot several times in the parking lot on an ordered hit from Phil Leotardo. Patsy Parisi accompanies him but flees on foot. Silvio is hospitalized in critical condition.
- Matthew Bevilaqua and Sean Gismonte desperately and unsuccessfully try to gain the attention of Tony Soprano, angering him by openly boasting of criminal activities in his presence in the washroom.
- Silvio Dante arrives at the club to open it in the morning and finds Christopher Moltisanti, coming down from a heroin binge vomiting heavily in the toilet, his hair in the toilet water. He later brings this up at Christopher's rehabilitation intervention.

== Filming location ==
All interior and exterior shots of the Bada Bing were filmed on location at Satin Dolls, an actual go-go bar on Route 17 in Lodi, New Jersey. Occasionally the neon "Satin Dolls" logo is visible on an interior wall of the club. The office scenes, however, were filmed on a sound stage at Silvercup Studios.

The popularity of the series and the notoriety of the Bada Bing! resulted in economic benefits through tours and souvenirs for the real-life club. After the series finale, the owners of the real bar decided to auction off the furnishings at the club and replace them with new ones.

The club's name has inspired a coffee shop chain in New Jersey called Bada Bean and a darts team in Los Angeles named "FADA Bing!".

== See also ==
- Satriale's Pork Store
