= Sting (musical phrase) =

Short musical phrase

A sting, sometimes called a sounder, is a short musical phrase, primarily used in broadcasting and films as a form of punctuation. For example, a sting might be used to introduce a regular section of a show, indicate the end of a scene, or indicate that a dramatic climax is imminent. A classic sting is the "Dun dun duuun!" played to indicate a period of suspense.

A sting can be played on a variety of instruments and performed by a group or orchestral ensemble.

A drum and cymbal punchline sting

Another form of sting, often mistakenly called a rimshot, is used only in comedy and played just on percussion instruments (such as drums or cymbals) as a payoff after the delivery of a punchline.

A musical sting can be used in drama, comedy, horror or any genre, and in radio and television advertising. It is a part of the music director's lexicon. It is often used to build tension. Stings are often used in horror movies to accentuate jump scares, called a "scare chord".

== See also ==
- Bumper music
- Stab (music)
- Sting (percussion)
- Sound effects
- Castle thunder
