= Dramatic Chipmunk =

Internet comedy viral video

The prairie dog after turning its head

Dramatic Chipmunk is a viral Internet video. The video is a five-second clip of a prairie dog (erroneously referred to as a chipmunk) turning its head while the camera zooms in and dramatic music is played.

== Origins ==
The clip of the prairie dog is from the Japanese television variety show Hello! Morning featuring the girl group Mini-Moni's segment, Mini-Moni Chiccha. The video consists of a prairie dog inside a transparent box being shown to Mini-Moni. It became widely known through uploads on YouTube and CollegeHumor on June 19, 2007. An earlier and identical version, titled as Dramatic Look, had been uploaded to YouTube on June 6, 2007. CollegeHumor also released a longer clip under the title Undramatic Chipmunk, showing how the video looked originally.

The audio used in Dramatic Chipmunk – sometimes known as the "Dun dun duuun!" sting – is taken from the score of the 1974 Mel Brooks film Young Frankenstein, which was composed by two-time Oscar nominee (and longtime Brooks collaborator) John Morris, and orchestrated by Morris and EGOT recipient Jonathan Tunick.

== Popularity ==
Since its release, the video has received over fifty million views. (Note: Determining an exact figure is impossible, because the video is uploaded multiple times on different websites. The most popular version on YouTube had over 36 million views as of October 2014. Other versions on YouTube have received millions of views each.) People Magazine named the Dramatic Chipmunk as one of The 10 Wildest YouTube Stars of 2007.

In 2008, South Park released an episode named "Canada on Strike". The Dramatic Chipmunk (referred to here as "Dramatic Look Gopher") was featured alongside other Internet celebrities (including Tay Zonday, Tron Guy and the viral "Sneezing Baby Panda") claiming his "internet money."

In 2008, The Powerpuff Girls released their 10th anniversary and series finale special, "The Powerpuff Girls Rule!!!". At the start of the special, Mojo Jojo is seen referencing the Dramatic Chipmunk meme when he is first introduced.

Since 2013, the Minnesota Golden Gophers have been known to play the Dramatic Chipmunk video on the Jumbotron during home football games to distract opposing kickers.

In the video game Overwatch, the Wrecking Ball character – an enhanced-intelligent hamster that pilots a mecha – was given a highlight introduction in April 2019 that spoofs the Dramatic Chipmunk meme.
