= Towel Boy =

American professional wrestler (born 1982)

Personal information
- Born: Eric Tuttle; June 15, 1982 (age 44)

Professional wrestling career
- Ring name(s): Eric Tuttle; Kid Evil; Kid Evil; The Metrosexual Male; Towel Boy
- Trained by: H. C. Loc
- Debut: February 4, 1999
- Retired: 2008

Eric Tuttle (born July 15, 1982) is an American retired professional wrestler. He is best known for his appearances with Extreme Championship Wrestling from 1999 to 2001 under the ring name Towel Boy. He is also known for his appearances with independent promotions such as Ring of Honor, Combat Zone Wrestling and Pro-Pain Pro Wrestling.

== Professional wrestling career ==
=== Extreme Championship Wrestling (1999-2001) ===
In the summer of 1999, Tuttle was hired by ECW as a part of their ring crew constructing and dismantling the ring before and after shows, In late 1999 at a houseshow in West Virginia, Tuttle was timekeeping the show when he was asked by Paul Heyman to get in the ring in between the matches and clean/wipe the ring ropes to make them less slippery for the highflying wrestlers like Yoshihiro Tajiri and Super Crazy. Immediately the crowd started chanting wooo wooo!, as he was doing this. Due to the crowd reaction and Tuttle's likeable backstage personality, Paul Heyman and Tommy Dreamer came up with the "Towel Boy" name. After debuting the gimmick on several houseshows during the fall of the year, On December 3, 2000, at the Massacre on 34th Street pay per view live from New York City, "Towel Boy" made his official ECW live PPV television debut interfering in a match between Tommy Dreamer and C. W. Anderson. "Towel Boy" also made a cameo at ECW's final Pay-per-view Guilty as Charged once again getting involved and helping Tommy Dreamer in his battle with CW Anderson.

=== Combat Zone Wrestling (2001–2003) ===
Towel Boy made his debut at War at Station 44 in Dover, Delaware, coming to the aid of his ECW alumnus Tommy Dreamer, which inadvertently he was no help and got destroyed and beaten down by his new boss John Zandig. Towel Boy was immediately paired up with The Hurricane Kid as "The Super Heavyweights" and with the manage assistance of Jeff Rocker they were without question the most entertaining tag team of Combat Zone Wrestling during that timeframe.

=== Ring of Honor (2002) ===
Towel Boy made his debut at the very first ROH show in 2002 The Era of Honor Begins wrestling Prince Nana, after the show Prince Nana formed an alliance with Tuttle as Nana was going to take him straight to the top, however Tuttle had to become his servant, Nana & Tuttle were unsuccessful at the next ROH show against Da Hit Squad and immediately parted ways.

=== Late career (2006–2008) ===
After a hiatus from professional wrestling Tuttle showed up to the CZW Chris Cash Memorial Show in 2006 and out of respect for his former friend wrestled on the show, At the show he met Eric "Jude" Crewe and within months they were wrestling on the independent circuit as "The Metro Sickness".

On March 24, 2007, at a Wicked Hanumn Wrestling show in Philadelphia, Pennsylvania, during a match between Faith & Nothing and "The Metro Sickness" Tuttle and Jude, Eric Tuttle broke both legs attempting to do a moonsault to the floor when both of his legs collided with the steel guardrail. Tuttle broke both fibulas and titanium steel rods were surgically placed in both of Tuttle's legs. After a successful surgery and months of physical therapy, Tuttle learned to walk again. He wrestled his final match in 2008.
