= Danny Doring and Roadkill =

Professional wrestling tag team

Tag team
- Members: Danny Doring; Roadkill
- Billed heights: 5 ft 10 in (1.78 m) – Doring; 6 ft 3 in (1.91 m) – Roadkill
- Combined billed weight: 536 lb (243 kg)
- Debut: 1997
- Disbanded: 2012

Danny Doring and Roadkill were a tag team in Extreme Championship Wrestling from 1996 to 2001. They were the final ECW World Tag Team Champions, holding the titles until the promotion closed in 2001.

== History ==
=== Extreme Championship Wrestling (1997-2001) ===
In December 1997, Doring and Roadkill formed together in an unlikely tag team. For six months, from April to October 1999, they were managed by Angelica (originally called "Miss Congeniality"), who was the onscreen girlfriend of Doring. At Heat Wave 1999, Doring proposed to her. Angelica, however, left ECW in late October 1999 to join the World Wrestling Federation (WWF, now WWE), where she became more famously known as Lita. Her last appearance was on October 23, 1999 at Re-enter the Sandman. After the departure of Miss Congeniality, the team was managed by Elektra until she turned on them at Living Dangerously in 2000, costing them a match against CW Anderson and Billy Wiles. In storyline, her reasoning for betraying her team was to join the Dangerous Alliance.

Doring and Roadkill quickly embarked on a two-year-long feud with Nova and Chris Chetti. This was followed by a series of feuds with The Impact Players (Lance Storm and Justin Credible), Simon Diamond and Johnny Swinger, The Bad Street Boys (Joey Matthews and Christian York) and then Tommy Dreamer and Raven.

The team won the ECW World Tag Team Championship on December 3, 2000 at the Massacre on 34th Street pay-per-view, defeating Tony Mamaluke and Little Guido. They held the title until ECW declared bankruptcy in March 2001.

=== Other promotions (2001-2006, 2012) ===
After leaving ECW, Doring and Roadkill made appearances with Total Nonstop Action Wrestling and wrestled dark matches for World Wrestling Entertainment. Both Doring and Roadkill appeared at the WWE promoted ECW reunion show, ECW One Night Stand on June 12, 2005. On July 23, Doring and Roadkill faced MNM on WWE Velocity, but lost. Doring and Roadkill teamed up again on WWE's rebranded ECW in 2006.

They reunited again on October 6, 2012, defeating the F.B.I. in the House of Hardcore's first show.

== Championships and accomplishments ==
- Extreme Championship Wrestling
  - ECW World Tag Team Championship (1 time)
