= Dun dun duuun! =

Common chord sequence in film and TV audio

A rendition of the musical sting, based on the "Shock Horror (A)" version recorded by Dick Walter in 1984

Dun dun duuun! is a short three-chord musical phrase, or "sting", widely used in movies and television to indicate a moment of suspense. In modern productions it is often used as a joke effect or to invoke a nostalgic feeling. There are three main variations of the sting.

== History ==
Its first documented use was in 1942 in CBS Radio's Suspense, where it was played at the end of the introduction of the first episode, The Burning Court. It is used to set the mood when the narrator recounts the protagonist looking through a book of famous poisoners through history, only to come across an image of his own wife. This version uses three descending chords. It was already in widespread use by this time, and may predate radio.

Igor Stravinsky's The Rite of Spring, features a similar three-note descending pattern. When it was used in the soundtrack of the 1940 movie Fantasia, Disney's version of the recording emphasised "two duns and a lingering duuun" at the end of a battle between dinosaurs.

An example is heard in the film Young Frankenstein, with the chord progression rising and then falling instead of all three chords falling. The Young Frankenstein version was used in the 2007 YouTube video Dramatic Chipmunk.

The most widely used modern variation is the "Shock Horror (A)" effect recorded in 1984 by composer Dick Walter as part of a series of four vinyl albums of sound snippets known as The Editor's Companion. This version is inverted from the Young Frankenstein pattern, using the notes E♭ - C - F♯, with the F♯ being especially discordant. Among its uses are Fresh Prince of Bel-Air, The Ren & Stimpy Show, and The IT Crowd.

In the PBS Kids series Weather Hunters, Corky Hunter uses a vocalised variation of the sting as a catchphrase for moments of heightened suspense.

== Bibliography ==
- Tait, Amelia (January 18, 2022). "Dun, Dun Duuun! Where did pop culture's most dramatic sound come from?". The Guardian.
- Sir Simon Rattle (September 24, 2017). The Rite of Spring. London Symphony Orchestra. - the "normal" playing of The Rite of Spring does not sound like the sting in Suspense
