= Elektra (wrestling) =

American professional wrestler (born 1970)

Personal information
- Born: Donna Adamo; November 12, 1970 (age 55) Brooklyn, New York, United States
- Spouse: Big Dick Dudley (divorced)
- Children: 1

Professional wrestling career
- Ring name(s): Electra; Elektra
- Billed height: 5 ft 8 in (173 cm)
- Billed weight: 112 lb (51 kg)
- Billed from: New York City
- Trained by: The Fabulous Moolah; Johnny Rodz
- Debut: 1999
- Retired: October 4, 2008 (final match)

Donna Adamo (born November 12, 1970) is an American retired professional wrestling valet and professional wrestler, better known by her ring name, Elektra. She is best known for her appearances with the Philadelphia, Pennsylvania-based promotion Extreme Championship Wrestling from October 1999 until its closure in April 2001. She is also known for her appearances in The Sopranos as a "Bada Bing Girl".

== Early life ==
Adamo grew up in New York City, where she worked as a child and adult model for Ford Models. Before deciding to become a professional wrestler, Adamo held a series of other jobs, including tending bar, working as a donut stuffer for Country Donuts, working as a booker for a modeling agency, working as a fitting model, performing as an oil wrestler at the strip clubs Billy Dean's and Goldfingers, and working as a booker for go go bars.

== Professional wrestling career ==
=== Early career (1999) ===
In the late 1990s, Adamo decided to become a professional wrestler. She was trained as a professional wrestler by The Fabulous Moolah in South Carolina and by Johnny Rodz in New York City. She debuted in 1999 under the ring name "Elektra".

Elektra appeared on the April 5, 1999 edition of WWF Raw is War, playing one of The Godfather's "hos" during his match with WWF Intercontinental Champion Goldust.

=== Extreme Championship Wrestling (1999–2001) ===
Elektra debuted in Extreme Championship Wrestling (ECW) in October 1999 at Re-enter the Sandman, with Cyrus the Virus presenting her to Danny Doring as a replacement for Miss Congeniality. She went on to act as a valet for Doring and his tag team partner, Roadkill, interfering in their matches and fighting with opposing valets such as Francine. Elektra became known for her ability to flex her pectoralis major muscles, which she would often do while delivering promos.

At Living Dangerously on March 12, 2000, Elektra turned on Doring and Roadkill, costing them a match against Lou E. Dangerously's New Dangerous Alliance (C. W. Anderson and Bill Wiles) by unbalancing Roadkill while he stood on the top rope. Later that night, Elektra delivered a promo in which she revealed that she had joined the New Dangerous Alliance. Elektra was subsequently nicknamed the "Director of Covert Operations" of the New Dangerous Alliance. At Hardcore Heaven 2000 on May 14, the New Dangerous Alliance came to the ring with Elektra wearing a Mike Awesome T-shirt (Awesome had abruptly left ECW for World Championship Wrestling the prior month and was an unpopular figure with ECW fans as a result). After Lou E. Dangerously described Elektra as "the toughest woman in wrestling today", Jazz attacked the New Dangerous Alliance and tore off Elektra's T-shirt, leaving her in a swimsuit.

After the New Dangerous Alliance disbanded, Elektra aligned herself with E. Z. Money, Julio Dinero and Chris Hamrick (collectively known as Hot Commodity). At Anarchy Rulz 2000 on October 1, Elektra accompanied E. Z. Money to the ring for his match with Kid Kash. Following the match, The Sandman caned the members of Hot Commodity before spitting beer over Elektra. At Massacre on 34th Street on December 3, Elektra received a Kryptonite Krunch from Nova prior to his bout with Julio Dinero.

At the final ECW pay-per-view, Guilty as Charged 2001 on January 7, 2001, Elektra accompanied E. Z. Money and Julio Dinero as they unsuccessfully challenged Doring and Roadkill for the ECW World Tag Team Championship. ECW staged its final show six days later and filed for bankruptcy on April 4, 2001.

Four years after the closure of ECW, Elektra (alongside C. W. Anderson and Chris Chetti) appeared in the front row of the audience of the World Wrestling Entertainment pay-per-view ECW One Night Stand on June 12, 2005, with The Sandman and Tommy Dreamer pouring beer on her chest and licking it off during their entrance.

=== NWA Total Nonstop Action (2002) ===
Elektra appeared on the inaugural NWA Total Nonstop Action pay-per-view on 19 June 2002, with Ed Ferrera and Don West announcing that she would take part in a "lingerie battle royal" to crown the first "Miss TNA" the following week. On the second weekly TNA pay-per-view, which aired on June 26, 2002, Elektra faced Alexis Laree, Erin Bray, Francine, Miss Joni, Miss Sasha, Shannon and Taylor Vaughn in the lingerie battle royal. The final two women left in the match were Elektra and Vaughn, with Vaughn eliminating Elektra to be crowned "Miss TNA". This was Elektra's final appearance in TNA.

== Satin Dolls and The Sopranos ==
Since retiring from professional wrestling in 2002, Elektra has worked as a booker for the Satin Dolls strip club in Lodi, New Jersey.

During the 2000s, Elektra made uncredited appearances as an extra in multiple episodes of the television series The Sopranos as a stripper in the "Bada Bing" strip club, scenes for which were filmed in Satin Dolls. Elektra and fellow "Bada Bing" strippers Justine Noelle, Kelly Madison Kole, Luiza Liccini, Marie Athanasiou, Nadine Marcelletti, Rosie Ciavolino and Sonia Ortega appeared in a photo spread in the August 2001 issue of Playboy magazine. Elektra intentionally lost muscle mass for the photoshoot. In June 2013, Elektra was interviewed by RTL Nieuws, expressing sadness at the sudden death of James Gandolfini, the actor who starred in The Sopranos.

== Personal life ==
Adamo was married to fellow wrestler Alex Rizzo, who she met while training under Johnny Rodz. The couple divorced prior to Rizzo's death in May 2002. They also have a daughter together.

Adamo is Italian American.

Adamo studied gemology at the Gemological Institute of America.

== Other media ==
Elektra appeared as a playable character in the videogame ECW Anarchy Rulz, released for the PlayStation and the Dreamcast in August 2000.
