= Joel Gertner =

American wrestling announcer

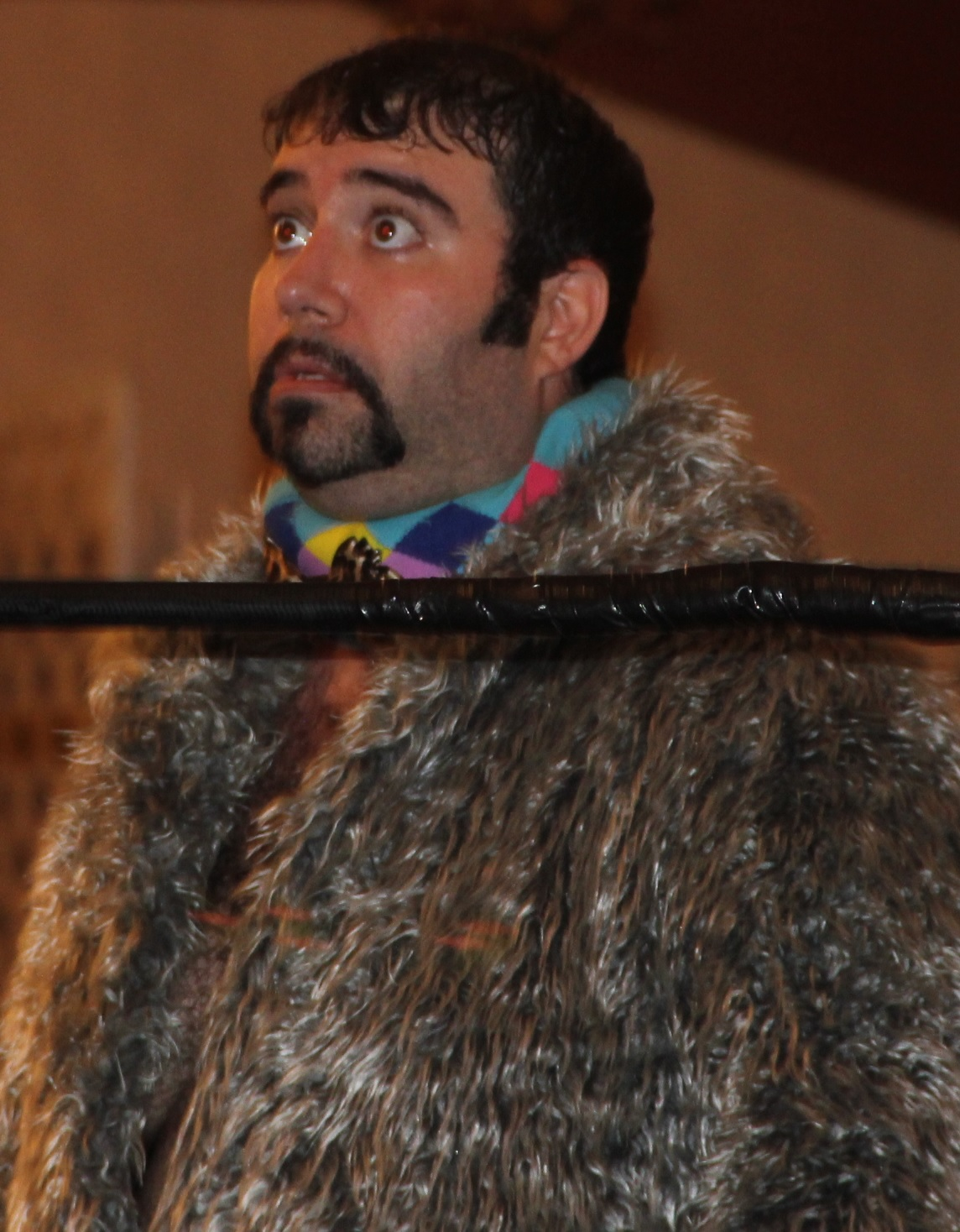
- Gertner in 2013

Personal information
- Born: September 20, 1975 (age 51) Brooklyn, New York, U.S.

Professional wrestling career
- Ring name(s): Joel Gertner; Joey Jaguar; Julio Caesar Valentino Alfonso; Studley Dudley
- Billed height: 5 ft 7 in (170 cm)
- Billed weight: 228.7 lb (104 kg)
- Billed from: New York City
- Debut: 1992

Joel Gertner (born September 20, 1975) is an American professional wrestling announcer, color commentator, and manager. He is best known for his appearances with Extreme Championship Wrestling from 1995 to 2001. He is also currently working with Juggalo Championship Wrestling (JCW) as a manager for Josh Bishop.

== Professional wrestling career ==
=== Early career (1992–1995) ===
Gertner debuted in professional wrestling in 1992 at the age of 17, making appearances at a local wrestling federation as a heel announcer under the nickname "Joey Jaguar". He would threaten the wrestlers and usually get beat up for his actions. Gertner attended Poly Prep Country Day School in Brooklyn, New York and started attending Cornell University in 1993. After his professional wrestling bookings started to interfere with his schoolwork, he dropped out of Cornell in the spring of 1996. Gertner was one year short of a bachelor's degree. Gertner also worked for the Cornell radio station.

=== Extreme Championship Wrestling (1995–2001) ===
Gertner began working for the Philadelphia, Pennsylvania-based promotion Extreme Championship Wrestling as a ring announcer in the summer of 1995. Soon after, Shane Douglas influenced Gertner to become a heel and Gertner started taunting and making fun of the babyface wrestlers during their introduction and as a result, the face wrestlers usually made Gertner pay for his insults. He was then given the position of a color commentator by Taz and Bill Alfonso to counterbalance the influence of announcer Joey Styles, who they regarded as being biased against them. He also hosted a segment on ECW's weekly television program entitled Gertner Vision. During this time, Gertner became popular with the fans for his introductions, which would consist of limericks containing multiple sexual innuendos.

Gertner later became the manager and ring announcer for The Dudley Boyz, even going as far as to be called "Studley Dudley". At Barely Legal, the Dudleys faced The Eliminators for the ECW World Tag Team Championship. During the match, Gertner was hit by The Eliminators finishing move, the Total Elimination, and as a result he began wearing his now infamous neckbrace and continues to do so. The Eliminators would go on to win the match and the titles as well. Joel involved himself in a six-man tag team match at 1998 Heat Wave, between Tommy Dreamer, The Sandman and Spike Dudley taking on D-Von, Big Dick and Bubba Ray, insulting head ECW referee John Finnigan. Later in the match Joel was hung in the tree of woe and Finnigan baseball slide a steel chair into his face. Despite the 'injury', Joel led the Dudley Boyz to a record eight ECW Tag Team Title reigns until they left for the World Wrestling Federation.

Upon the Dudleys departure, Gertner then became a broadcaster on ECW on TNN alongside Joey Styles. Upon doing so, Gertner turned face and began feuding with The Network's representative Cyrus, and got unlikely support from broadcast partner (and former nemesis) Joey Styles. The feud came to a head at Anarchy Rulz in which Gertner faced Cyrus in a one on one match. Gertner won the match and ended the feud after assistance from The Sandman. Gertner remained with ECW until its closure on April 4, 2001. Gertner showed up on ECW's last pay-per-view Guilty As Charged where he began to cut a promo before being attacked by Cyrus and Da Baldies. He returned later during the main event attacking Cyrus and helping Rob Van Dam perform a Van Terminator on Jerry Lynn.

=== Independent circuit (2001–present) ===
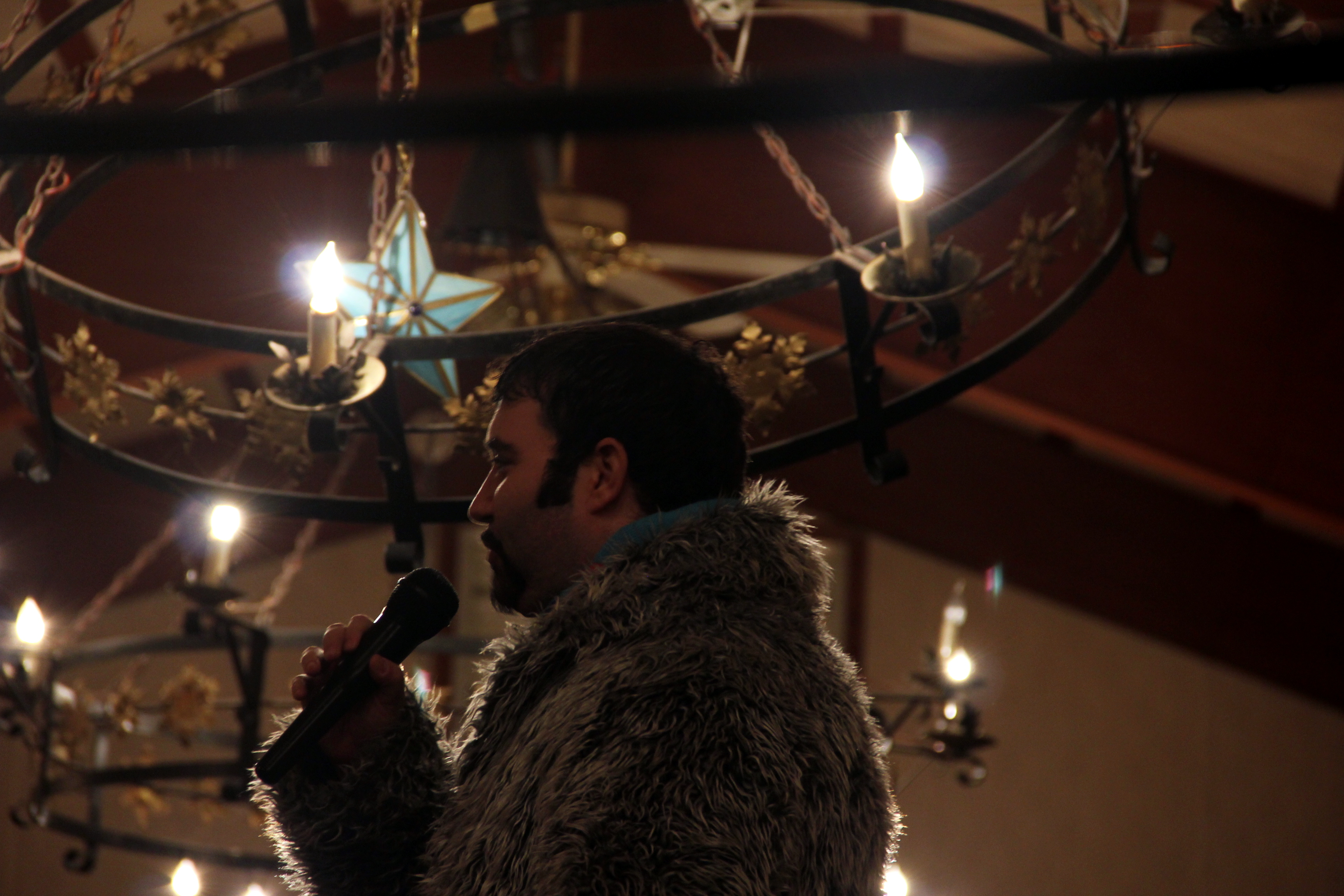
Gertner performing on the independent circuit in 2013.

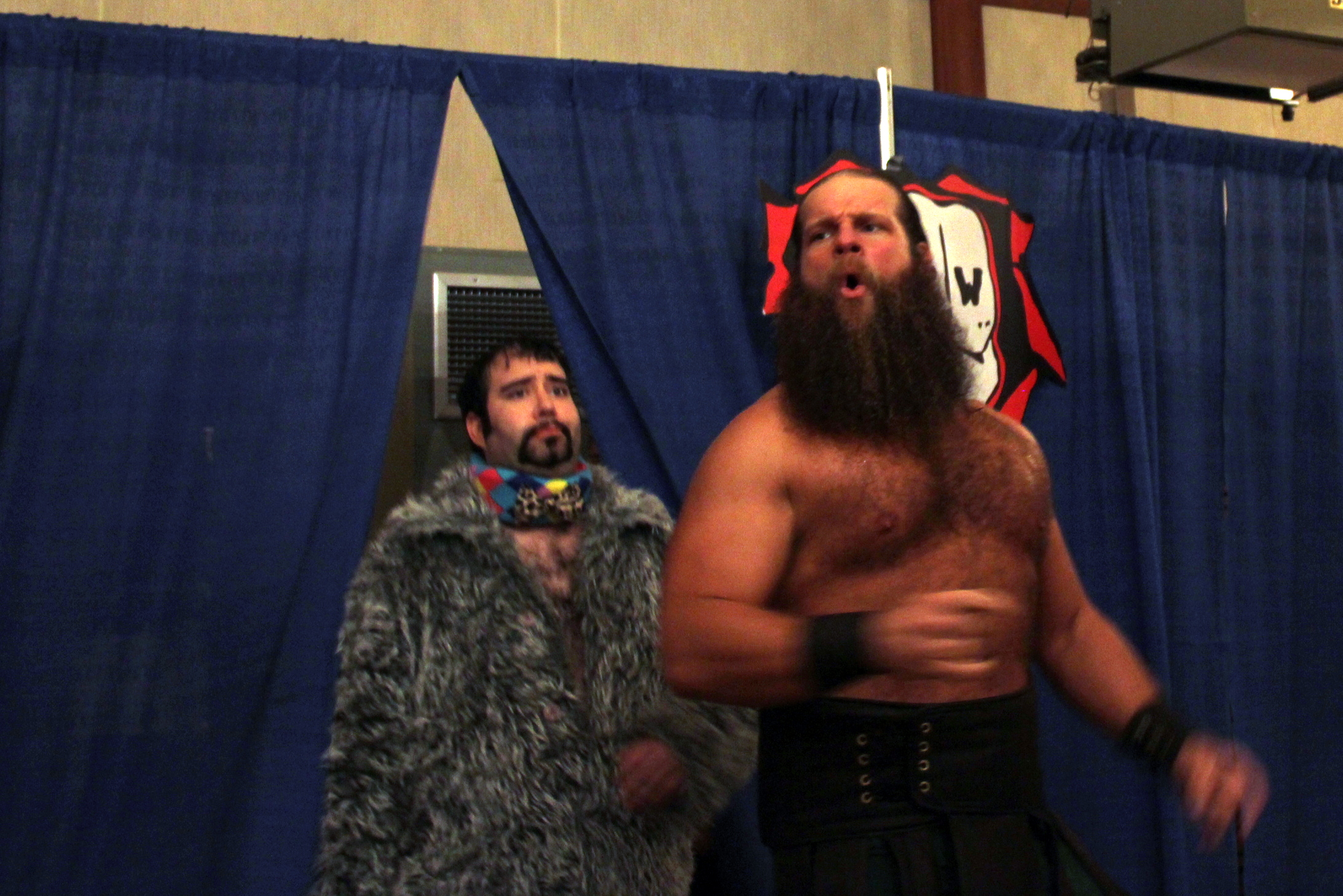
Gertner performing on the independent circuit in 2013.

Gertner made his Total Nonstop Action Wrestling debut on June 26, 2002 to introduce the a new tag team called the Rainbow Express (Bruce and Lenny Lane). However, he left TNA shortly after this and did not make any appearances for the company until 2010. He was also featured in World Wrestling Entertainment's first-ever ECW One Night Stand reunion pay-per-view during which, in the course of two separate interviews with SmackDown! and Raw, he was pie-faced by John "Bradshaw" Layfield and begged on his hands and knees to then-Raw General Manager Eric Bischoff for a job. Gertner also appeared at Hardcore Homecoming and faced former enemy Cyrus. After Cyrus seemingly made amends, he insulted Gertner and Gertner subsequently attacked him before being pulled off by Joey Styles.

Gertner is also the promoter for Connecticut's MXW Pro Wrestling independent organization. On August 8, 2010, Gertner returned to TNA to take part in ECW reunion show, Hardcore Justice, where he accompanied Team 3D to the ring. In 2012, Gertner began announcing for Shane Douglas' Extreme Rising promotion. Gertner also made a special appearance at a Kaiju Big Battel event. Gertner, on April 27, 2014 at the former ECW Arena in South Philadelphia, was the MC for Masked Mania, and he spoke perfect Spanish throughout the event.

In the summer of 2016, Gertner began commentating for Wildkat Sports and Entertainment in New Orleans. He also makes regular appearances at their events as a ring announcer.

He lost to former ECW manager Bill Alfonso at Battleground Championship Wrestling in Philadelphia on April 5, 2024.

== Awards and accomplishments ==
- New England Pro Wrestling Hall of Fame
  - Class of 2023

== See also ==
- List of Jewish professional wrestlers
