= Chris Chetti =

American retired professional wrestler (born 1974)

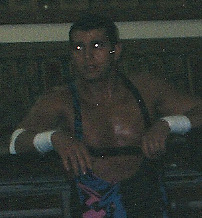
- Chetti in 1998

Personal information
- Born: Christopher Chetti; July 16, 1974 (age 52) Copiague, New York, U.S.
- Family: Taz (cousin); Hook (cousin once removed)

Professional wrestling career
- Ring name(s): Chris Chetti; Chris Van De Lay; G. Q. Gorgeous; G. Q. Quartermaine
- Billed height: 5 ft 10 in (178 cm)
- Billed weight: 227 lb (103 kg)
- Billed from: "Mount Climax"
- Trained by: Taz; Mikey Whipwreck
- Debut: September 21, 1996
- Retired: 2013

Christopher Chetti (born July 16, 1974) is an American retired professional wrestler, best known for his appearances with Extreme Championship Wrestling (ECW) between 1996 and 2001.

== Professional wrestling career ==
=== Extreme Championship Wrestling (1996–2001) ===
==== Early years (1996–1998) ====
Chetti was trained at the Extreme Championship Wrestling (ECW) "House of Hardcore" professional wrestling school by Mikey Whipwreck and his cousin, Taz. He made his professional wrestling debut under the ring name "G. Q. Gorgeous" as one half of the tag team Erotic Experience with Precious Pat Day at a live event in Middletown, New York, on September 21, 1996, where they lost to The Dudleys (Buh Buh Ray and Spike). Erotic Experience made a few appearances at ECW live events for the next few months as enhancement talents against more established wrestlers. Chetti's first win was against fellow House of Hardcore student Roadkill on November 22 and November 23.

Chetti changed his ring name to "Chris Van de Lay" and made his televised debut on the January 30, 1997, episode of Hardcore TV against Mikey Whipwreck in a losing effort. He soon began using his given name "Chris Chetti" in a match against The Full Blooded Italians member Little Guido at Winter Blowout. Chetti soon established himself as a fan favorite and began feuding with the F.B.I., primarily against Little Guido, whom he defeated for the first time at CyberSlam. At Hostile City Showdown, Chetti teamed with Tracy Smothers to take on F.B.I. members Little Guido and Tommy Rich, during which Smothers turned on Chetti to join Full Blooded Italians. Chetti continued his rivalry with FBI over the next few months. He received several title shots against Shane Douglas for the World Television Championship at The Buffalo Invasion and Wrestlepalooza but failed to win the title on both occasions.

Chetti formed a tag team with Jerry Lynn as the two defeated FBI in a tag team match at Hostile City Showdown on January 31, 1998. Chetti and Lynn won a rematch against FBI at Living Dangerously, where Chetti made his pay-per-view debut. Chetti feuded with FBI throughout the rest of 1998. At UltraClash, Chetti teamed with J.T. Smith and Tommy Rogers to defeat Little Guido, Tommy Rich and Tracy Smothers in an Italian Vendetta six-man tag team match.

==== Teaming and feuding with Nova (1999–2001) ====
Chetti's first major match in 1999 was a win against Steve Corino at House Party. He soon formed a tag team with Nova. The team of Chetti and Nova had their first feud with Rod Price and Skull Von Krush, whom they defeated at CyberSlam. Chetti and Nova then exchanged wins with Danny Doring and Roadkill at Hostile City Showdown and Heat Wave. At Anarchy Rulz, Nova and Chris Chetti fought Simon Diamond and DeVito to a no contest after interference from ECW wrestlers. At the 2000 Guilty as Charged pay-per-view, Chetti substituted for an injured Jazz as Nova and Kid Kash's tag team partner against the team of Danny Doring, Roadkill and Simon Diamond in a losing effort. Chetti and Nova defeated the team of Jado and Gedo at Living Dangerously. Following the win, they entered the World Tag Team Championship picture as they challenged the tag team champions The Impact Players (Lance Storm and Justin Credible) for the title on the April 24 episode of Hardcore TV in a losing effort. The following week, on Hardcore TV, Chetti defeated Credible in a match, which earned Chetti and Nova, another title shot at Impact Players on the April 14 episode of ECW on TNN, which they lost.

Nova and Chetti then continued their success in the tag team division by defeating The New Dangerous Alliance (C. W. Anderson and Bill Wiles) at Wrestlepalooza. At Hardcore Heaven, Chetti and Nova defeated Da Baldies (Angel and Tony DeVito) and the team of Danny Doring and Roadkill in a three-way dance. At Heat Wave, Chetti and Nova defeated Da Baldies in a tag team match. On the August 6 episode of Hardcore TV, Chetti received his first opportunity for the ECW World Heavyweight Championship, challenging Justin Credible for the title in a losing effort.

In August 2000 at Midtown Massacre, Chetti and Nova participated in a tournament for the vacant ECW World Tag Team Championship, where they lost to Simon Diamond and Johnny Swinger in the quarter-final. The following week, on Hardcore TV, Chetti and Nova competed against Simon and Swinger and Danny Doring and Roadkill in a three-way dance, during which Chetti turned on Nova by hitting him with a chair and causing him to get eliminated, thus turning into a villain for the first time in his ECW career. This disbanded their team and Chetti cut promos in which he berated Nova and held him responsible for Chetti's downfall in ECW and Chetti aligned himself with Lou E. Dangerously. The two former partners began a rivalry against each other, which culminated in a loser leaves town match between the two at November to Remember, which Nova won. This turned out to be Chetti's final ECW match. Chetti returned to ECW at the company's final pay-per-view, Guilty as Charged on January 7, 2001, where he jumped into Nova's match against Chris Hamrick as the special guest referee to favour Hamrick until Spike Dudley made the save for Nova.

=== Independent circuit; retirement (2001–2005) ===
After leaving ECW, Chetti participated in several independent promotions, such as Midwest Championship Wrestling, USA Pro Wrestling and Phoenix Championship Wrestling. During his short stay with the aforementioned promotions, Chetti had rivalries with wrestlers such as Joey Matthews, Nova and Balls Mahoney. Nevertheless, little activity in the promotions and a lack of a final contract carried Chetti to a constant change of home promotions, until October 2002 when he signed a contract with Xtreme Pro Wrestling.

On October 5, 2002, Chetti debuted in Xtreme Pro Wrestling at the event Fallout, which was their second show on The East Coast. He defeated Chris Hamrick. During the next months, he failed to win a match, losing to opponents including Shark Boy, Psicosis, and Super Crazy.

On November 23, 2002, Chetti proclaimed himself the new ECW FTW Heavyweight Champion, only to lose the title on July 16, 2003, against Danny Doring. Neither title changes are recognised in the history of the championship.

Chetti's appeared at ringside at One Night Stand 2005. After sustaining a back injury, Chetti went into retirement.

=== Pro Wrestling Syndicate, other ventures (2013, 2023) ===
Chetti broke his retirement for a single night on April 5, 2013, teaming with Nova to defeat Hurricane Helms and Starman at a pay-per-view event promoted by Pro Wrestling Syndicate in Metuchen, New Jersey. He would return for another night at a live Create A Pro Wrestling event on December 14, 2023, in a tag match with Brian Myers, defeating GKM and Leo Sparrow.

== Championships and accomplishments ==
- NWA Midwest
  - NWA Midwest BMF Championship (1 time)
- New York Wrestling Connection
  - NYWC Tag Team Gauntlet Winner (2004)
- NPWA
  - NPWA Tag Team Championship (1 time) - with Qenaan Creed
- Oulaw Wrestling
  - Oulaw Wrestling Tag Team Championship (1 time) - with Danny Doring
- Superstars of Wrestling Federation
  - SWF Light Heavyweight Champion (1 time)
  - SWF Tag Team Championship (1 time) - with Danny Jaxx
- UWF Wrestling
  - UWF Light Heavyweight Championship (1 time)
- Wrestling Superstars
  - Wrestling Superstars United Light Heavyweight Championship (1 time)
