= Danny Doring =

American professional wrestler (born 1974)

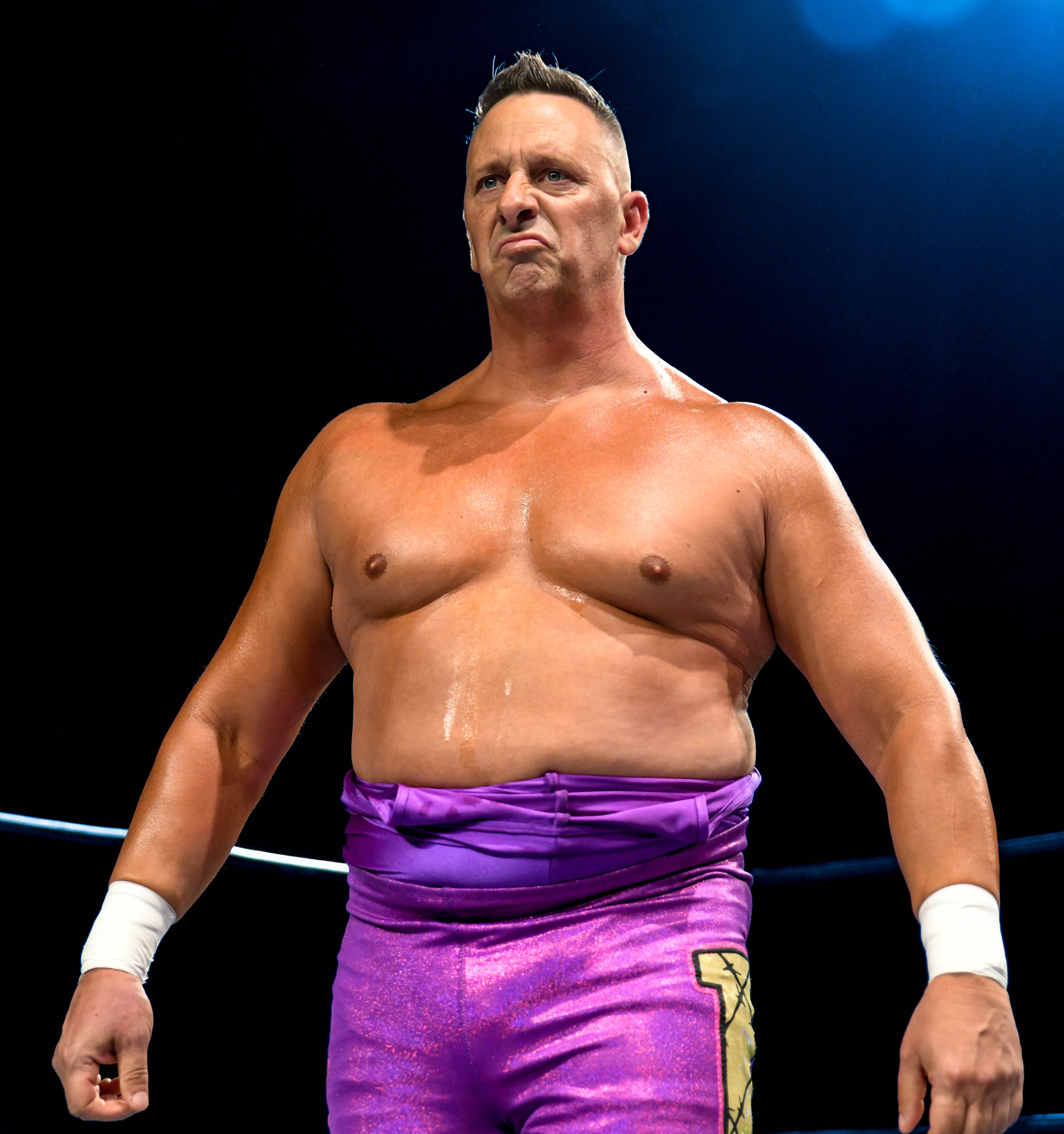
- Doring in 2025

Personal information
- Born: Daniel Morrison; February 19, 1974 (age 52) Pepper Pike, Ohio, U.S.

Professional wrestling career
- Ring name(s): Dandandan; Danny Doring; Danny Morrison; The Sugarmask
- Billed height: 5 ft 10 in (178 cm)
- Billed weight: 219 lb (99 kg)
- Billed from: Pepper Pike, Ohio
- Trained by: Tazz; Perry Saturn; Devon Hughes; Mark LoMonaco; Mikey Whipwreck
- Debut: 1996

Daniel Morrison (born February 19, 1974) is an American professional wrestler, better known by the ring name Danny Doring. He is best known for his appearances with the professional wrestling promotion Extreme Championship Wrestling from 1997 to 2001.

== Professional wrestling career ==
=== Extreme Championship Wrestling (1996–2001) ===
Doring was trained by Taz, Bubba Ray Dudley and Perry Saturn at the ECW House of Hardcore in 1996. Once his training was complete, he joined the ECW roster, facing Taz in his debut match in May 1997. Doring's original gimmick was that of a wrestler who used many unexciting holds and had vertigo, so would not use high-flying moves. When the audience chanted "boring", Doring would pretend that they were chanting for him.

In December 1997, Doring changed his gimmick to that of a womanizer, and formed an unlikely tag team with his fellow House of Hardcore graduate, Roadkill. They were managed by Angelica, his on-screen girlfriend, for six months, until she left ECW in October 1999 at Re-enter the Sandman to join the World Wrestling Federation as Lita, and then by Elektra until she turned on them in 2000.

Doring and Roadkill quickly embarked on a two-year-long feud with Nova and Chris Chetti. This was followed by a series of matches with Simon Diamond and Johnny Swinger and Joey Matthews and Christian York. The team won the ECW World Tag Team Championship on December 3, 2000, at the Massacre on 34 Street pay-per-view, defeating Tony Mamaluke and Little Guido. They held the title until ECW declared bankruptcy in April 2001.

After this, Doring competed in Xtreme Pro Wrestling (XPW) which featured a similar style of hardcore wrestling to ECW.

=== World Wrestling Entertainment (2005–2006) ===
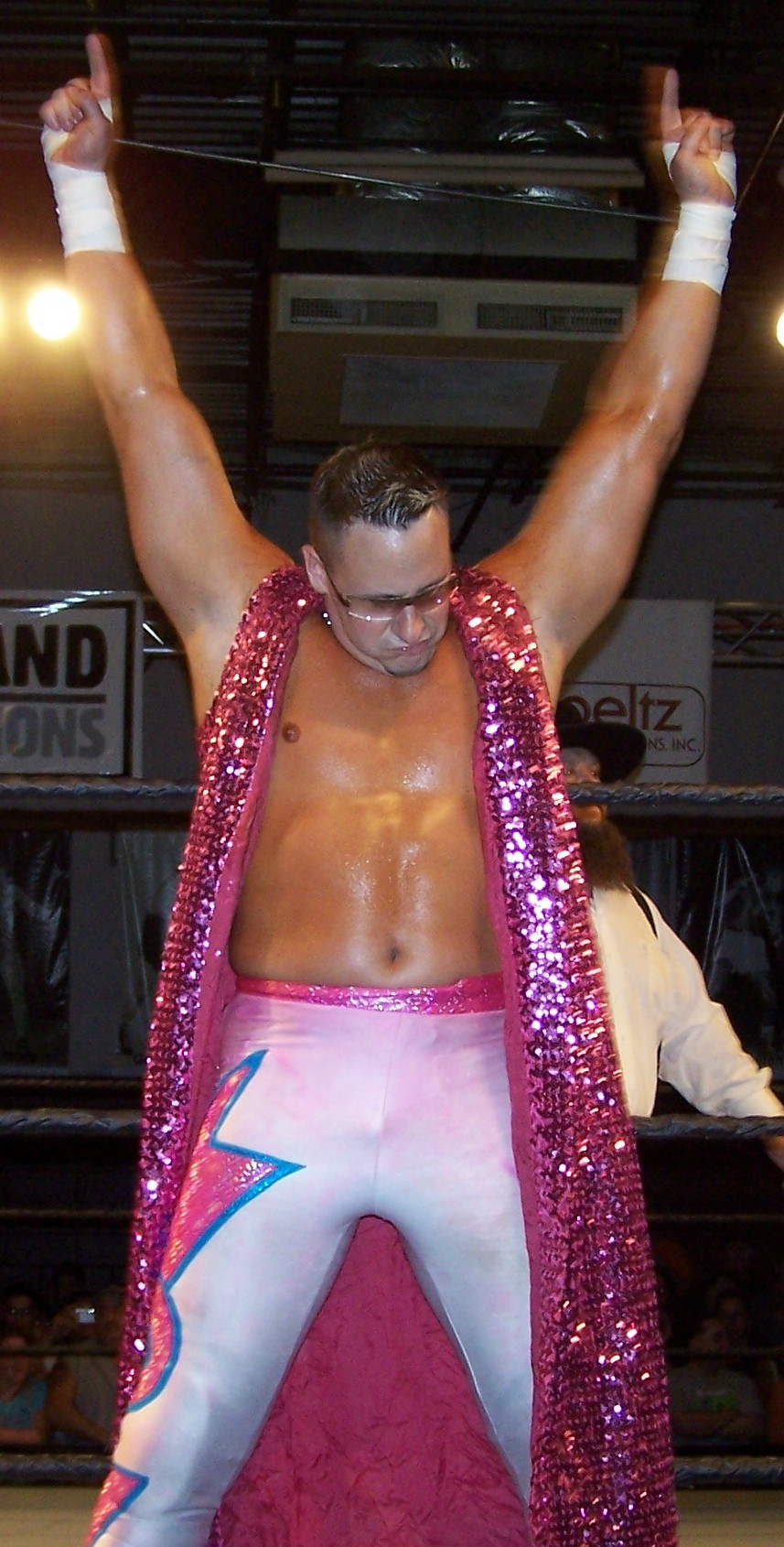
Doring in 2006

Doring appeared at the WWE promoted ECW reunion show, ECW One Night Stand 2005 on June 12, 2005. Subsequently, he has competed in try-out matches for the WWE SmackDown brand alongside Roadkill.

On May 5, 2006, WWE announced through their mobile news service that Doring had signed a contract with them to appear on the upcoming ECW brand. On the premiere June 13 edition of ECW, Doring took part in a battle royal (with the winner facing John Cena at Vengeance). Doring appeared on an episode of ECW against Mike Knox and lost to him. After losing a match to Rob Van Dam on the August 22 episode of ECW, he and Van Dam were both attacked by the returning Hardcore Holly. Doring wrestled a match of an ECW show in 2006. This was against CM Punk, which Danny would lose. He competed in live events with the likes of Nunzio and one time Kurt Angle, mostly in losing efforts.

He was released from WWE in December 2006.

=== Independent circuit (2006–present) ===
Doring appeared at Maryland Championship Wrestling's Holiday Homecoming event in Glen Burnie, Maryland on December 28, 2006, wrestling as The Sugarmask (as the name suggests, under a mask) in the opening match against D. J. Hyde. After defeating Hyde, he unmasked to reveal himself to the fans. Doring debuted at the January 5, 2008 show of Force One Pro Wrestling, titled Badge of Honor. He won a four-way elimination match, featuring Mike Reed, Nicky Benz, and Rockin' Rebel. At the March 16, 2008 Force One show titled Never Surrender Doring defeated Breaker Morant to win the Force One Pro Wrestling Heavyweight Championship. He defeated Breaker Morant again at the May 3, 2008 show titled Pledge of Allegiance 2: These Colors Don't Run. On the June 21, 2008, show titled Justice For All Doring lost the belt, now known as the NWA Force One Pro Wrestling Heavyweight Championship to Stevie Richards. He was unsuccessful in a rematch and is yet to return to the promotion since. Also, he wrestled against F.B.I. with Roadkill, defeating F.B.I. on October 6, 2012, in the first House of Hardcore show.

In June 2015, as Danny Morrison, he served as commentator of House of Hardcore TV.

ISPW - Danny was the longest tenured champion of ISPW.

== Professional wrestling style and persona ==
Doring was frequently known by the nicknames "Dastardly" and "The Danaconda" during his ECW career and used Soul Coughing's song "Super Bon Bon" as his entrance theme song in ECW. He used Wham, Bam, Thank You Ma'am as his finishing move. He had a variety of signature moves which included a back elbow, the Bareback,

== Personal life ==
Doring has a wife, Miamarie and three children; a son, and twin girls.

As a child and teenager, he dreamed of becoming a professional wrestler, his hero being "Macho Man" Randy Savage.

He is a fan of the Dallas Cowboys.

== Championships and accomplishments ==
- Assault Championship Wrestling
  - ACW Hardcore Championship (1 time)
- Championship Wrestling New York/ Showcase Championship Wrestling
  - CWNY Heavyweight Championship (1 time)
  - SCW Heavyweight Championship (1 time)
- Extreme Championship Wrestling
  - ECW World Tag Team Championship (1 time) - with Roadkill
- Independent Superstars Of Pro Wrestling
  - ISPW World Heavyweight Championship (1 time)
- Maryland Championship Wrestling
  - MCW Heavyweight Championship (1 time)
  - MCW Tag Team Championship (1 time) - with Danny Jaxx
- Mid-Eastern Wrestling Federation
  - MEWF Heavyweight Championship (1 time)
- NWA Florida
  - NWA Florida Heavyweight Championship (2 times)
- NWA Force One Pro Wrestling
  - Force One Pro Wrestling Heavyweight Championship (2 times)
- NWA Upstate
  - NWA Upstate Heavyweight Championship (2 times)
- Outlaw Wrestling
  - Outlaw Wrestling Tag Team Championship (1 time) - with Chris Chetti
- Pro Wrestling Illustrated
  - PWI ranked him #118 of the top 500 singles wrestlers in the PWI 500 in 2001
- World Wrestling Stars Alliance
  - WWSA Championship (1 time)
- WrestlePro
  - WrestlePro Tag Team Championship (1 time) - with Craig Steele
- Wrestling Action of Today
  - WAT Florida Heavyweight Championship (1 time)
  - WAT Championship of the Galaxy (1 time)

== See also ==
- Danny Doring and Roadkill
