= Dangerous Alliance =

Professional wrestling stable

Stable
- Members: See below
- Name: Dangerous Alliance
- Debut: 1987
- Disbanded: 1995
- Years active: 1987–1995

The Dangerous Alliance was a professional wrestling stable that was active in World Championship Wrestling (WCW) in the 1990s. It had its origins in the American Wrestling Association (AWA) and later moved to Extreme Championship Wrestling (ECW). The group derives its name from "Paul E. Dangerously", the ring name of its founder and manager Paul Heyman.

== History ==
=== Championship Wrestling Association (1987–1988) ===
In early 1987, Paul E. Dangerously formed the original Dangerous Alliance with Austin Idol in the Championship Wrestling Association in Memphis and feuded with Jerry Lawler. In April 1987, Tommy Rich joined Dangerously and Idol, as he helped Idol defeated Lawler in a hair vs. hair cage match for the AWA Southern Heavyweight Championship, nearly causing a riot at the Mid-South Coliseum. He would also recruit Jack Hart, Chick Donovan, Eddie Gilbert, Doug Gilbert and Missy Hyatt. They would cause chaos in the CWA, until Dangerously and the Gilberts left Memphis in March 1988, after Eddie threw a fireball at Randy Hales and a parking lot brawl with Jerry Lawler.

=== American Wrestling Association (1987–1988) ===
In the spring of 1987, Dangerously formed another version of the Dangerous Alliance with Adrian Adonis and The Midnight Express (Dennis Condrey and Randy Rose) in the American Wrestling Association (AWA).

In October 1987, Dangerously successfully led Condrey and Rose to win the AWA World Tag Team Championship from Mid-South legends Jerry Lawler and Bill Dundee, only to lose the titles to The Midnight Rockers (Shawn Michaels and Marty Jannetty) two months later. Dangerously also helped Adonis in his feud with Tommy Rich and his bid to win the AWA International Television Championship, in which Adonis lost the title in a tournament final to Greg Gagne. By 1988, the Dangerous Alliance disbanded, as Dangerously, Condrey, and Rose left the AWA, while Adonis died that July in a van accident during a tour in Canada.

=== Continental Wrestling Federation (1988) ===
In April 1988, Dangerously, Gilbert and Hyatt joined Continental Championship Wrestling, renaming it the Continental Wrestling Federation. They reformed the Dangerous Alliance and recruited Ken Wayne, Eddie's brother Doug as the masked Nightmare Freddie, Lord Humungous (until he turned babyface in June 1988), Detroit Demolition, Dirty White Boy, Dirty White Girl and Jerry Stubbs. By the beginning of October 1988, the Alliance had disbanded when Dangerously, Eddie Gilbert and Hyatt left the territory to join World Championship Wrestling.

=== World Championship Wrestling (1991-1992) ===
==== Halloween Havoc (1991) ====
After Dangerously was "fired" as an announcer for World Championship Wrestling, the precursors to resurrecting his stable came at the Halloween Havoc pay-per-view in Chattanooga, Tennessee. Prior to the show, announcer Eric Bischoff was working as a valet in the parking lot. When Dustin Rhodes and Barry Windham pulled up and got out of their car, the reigning World Tag Team Champions Arn Anderson and Larry Zbyszko ran up to Bischoff and Windham and slammed the car door on Windham's hand, breaking it. It was from this incident that Zbyszko gained his nickname from around this time, "The Cruncher".

Later at the same show, the mysterious WCW Halloween Phantom appeared, and squashed Tom Zenk in a match using a reverse neckbreaker. Then, in an interview segment with Bischoff, Dangerously brought out the Phantom and had him unmask to reveal the returning "Ravishing" Rick Rude. Dangerously stated that even though he had been fired as a commentator, he still had his manager's license, and would use Rude to exact his revenge on the company that fired him.

==== Clash of the Champions XVII ====
The storyline was furthered at Clash of the Champions XVII on November 19, 1991 in Savannah, Georgia. At the beginning of the Clash, which was televised live on TBS, WCW United States Heavyweight Champion (and perennial face) Sting was in the ring doing an interview. Madusa came out dressed as a harem girl and distracted Sting so WCW World Heavyweight Champion Lex Luger could attack him from behind by clipping his knee, the same one Sting injured in February 1990. Luger then bashed the knee against the runway repeatedly to make it seem like Sting had suffered severe damage. Several face wrestlers, including Bobby Eaton, ran out to run the heel Luger off and take Sting to the hospital. Sting, however, had to defend his title against Rude that night and did not want to leave. Eaton kept telling him he would have time, so he left. Bischoff rode in the ambulance with Sting and gave live updates on the condition of Sting from the hospital between matches to announcers Jim Ross and Tony Schiavone. Meanwhile, Dangerously had found a loophole in the match contract that specifically stated that if Sting was not able to defend his title, he would have to forfeit it to Rude. The announcers relayed the message to Bischoff, who in turn passed it along to Sting. Commotion could be heard in the background as Sting tried to leave the hospital and return to defend his title. It turned out that Eaton had been conspiring with Dangerously and Rude to ensure Sting did not make it out in time for his title defense.

When it came time for the match, Sting was a no-show and Dangerously declared Rude the United States Heavyweight Champion (which had been their plan all along). The telecast featured a split screen of the ambulance arriving at the back area of the arena with Sting's knee wrapped up. Dangerously demanded referee Nick Patrick start the match and count Sting out, but he kept interrupting the count which allowed Sting enough time to make it out to the ring. After having trouble finding the right door to enter the building, his fight song started playing and Sting limped out. Rude met him at the runway with punches but Sting was so pumped he took it to him instead and the match was underway. Rude defeated Sting, mainly due to his injured knee, with a small package pin. On the following episode of World Championship Wrestling (this was before Monday Nitro), Dangerously announced the formation of the Dangerous Alliance, which included Rude, Eaton, Anderson, Zbyszko, Madusa, and ”Stunning” Steve Austin.

==== Notable feuds ====
The Dangerous Alliance went on to dominate WCW for the next six months, as Anderson and Eaton won the WCW World Tag Team Championship and Austin held the WCW World Television Championship for a time. Their main feuds were with Sting, Ricky Steamboat, Barry Windham, Dustin Rhodes, and Nikita Koloff. The Alliance and its rivals went back and forth until they settled their issues in a gruesome "WarGames" match at WrestleWar (1992). During the match, Rude removed the turnbuckle from the post; Zbyszko tried to hit Sting with the metal hook, but ended up hitting his stablemate Eaton instead, allowing Sting to apply an armbar to Eaton and garner a submission victory for his team. After the match, Zbyszko was expelled from the Alliance, which began the group's downfall.

==== WCW downfall ====
Rude and Madusa went their own separate way and had much success. Anderson and Eaton started running with Michael Hayes, but they came back to Dangerously when he fired Madusa publicly at Halloween Havoc in October and she came after him, Austin went on forming a tag team with Flyin Brian. By the end of November 1992 after the Clash of the Champions XXI, the Dangerous Alliance had disbanded after Dangerously left after a bitter contract dispute.

Arn Anderson, in an interview video with RF Video, referred to the Dangerous Alliance as one of the greatest gatherings of talent ever. However, Anderson opined that it never became a memorable group because of WCW's incompetent bookers (i.e. Jim Herd, Kip Allen Frey, and Bill Watts) failing to promote stars.

=== Eastern/Extreme Championship Wrestling (1993–1995) ===
Dangerously revived the Dangerous Alliance in NWA Eastern Championship Wrestling (NWA-ECW) in 1993 with Jimmy Snuka, Don Muraco, The Dark Patriot and "Hot Stuff" Eddie Gilbert. On the October 19th, 1993 episode of ECW Hardcore TV, Paul Heyman introduced a new Dangerous Alliance featuring ECW Heavyweight Champion Shane Douglas and Sherri Martel as Director of Covert Operations. When Heyman attempted to introduce Sabu as the bodyguard, Shane Douglas balked and stated that he was not consulted on this decision. Sherri Martel sided with Shane Douglas and the arguments continued in the locker room. By August 1994, when ECW broke away from the NWA and renamed itself Extreme Championship Wrestling, Dangerously formed the last incarnation of the Dangerous Alliance composed of The Tazmaniac, Sabu, and 911. Tazmaniac and Sabu wound up winning the ECW World Tag Team Championship in February 1995, before losing the titles three weeks later. In April 1995, Sabu was fired by Dangerously, due to choosing a tour with New Japan Pro-Wrestling (NJPW) over a booking on April 8. In July 1995, The Tazmaniac, now under the name Taz, suffered a serious neck injury during a tag team match in Florida. With Sabu fired and Taz injured, Dangerously finally disbanded The Dangerous Alliance.

== Members ==
=== CWA members ===
- Eddie Gilbert
- Paul E. Dangerously – manager of Gilbert
- Missy Hyatt - valet of Gilbert
- Austin Idol
- Tommy Rich
- Jack Hart
- Chic Donovan
- Doug Gilbert

=== AWA members ===
- Adrian Adonis
- Dennis Condrey
- Paul E. Dangerously – leader and manager
- Randy Rose

=== CWF members ===
- Eddie Gilbert
- Paul E. Dangerously – manager of Gilbert
- Missy Hyatt - valet of Gilbert
- Lord Humongous
- Detroit Demolition
- Nightmare Ken Wayne
- Nightmare Freddie
- Dirty White Boy
- Dirty White Girl – valet of Dirty White Boy
- Jerry Stubbs

=== WCW members ===
- Paul E. Dangerously – Leader and manager of the Alliance
- Arn Anderson
- Bobby Eaton
- Larry Zbyszko
- Madusa – Valet
- Michael "P.S." Hayes – Manager
- Rick Rude
- Steve Austin

=== ECW members ===
- Paul Heyman – Manager
- 911
- The Dark Patriot
- Don Muraco
- Eddie Gilbert
- Jimmy Snuka
- Shane Douglas
- Sherri Martel – valet of Douglas
- Sabu
- Taz/Tazmaniac

==== The New Dangerous Alliance ====
- Billy Wiles
- CW Anderson
- Erik Watts
- Elektra – Valet
- Lou E. Dangerously – Manager
- Johnny Swinger
- Simon Diamond

== Championships ==
- American Wrestling Association
  - AWA World Tag Team Championship (1 time) – Randy Rose and Dennis Condrey
- Extreme Championship Wrestling
  - ECW World Heavyweight Championship (1 time) – Don Muraco
  - ECW World Tag Team Championship (2 times) – The Dark Patriot and Eddie Gilbert (1), The Tazmaniac and Sabu (1)
  - ECW World Television Championship (1 time) – Jimmy Snuka
- World Championship Wrestling
  - WCW United States Heavyweight Championship (1 time) – Rick Rude
  - WCW World Tag Team Championship (2 times) – Bobby Eaton and Arn Anderson (1), Arn Anderson and Larry Zbyszko (1)
  - WCW World Television Championship (3 times) – Steve Austin (2), Arn Anderson (1)
