= Sting (percussion) =

Short percussion sequence accompanying a joke

Sample of a sting
Recording of a classic basic sting, using two drums and then an unchoked cymbal

A sting is a short drum sequence played by a drummer to punctuate a joke, especially an obvious one. A sting is often used as accompaniment during cabaret- and circus-style shows. Sometimes the sound of the sting is written ba dum tsh, ba-dum cha, ba-dum ching, ba dum tiss and occasionally ba dum tis. In British English, boom boom is used, for example in "Ha ha ha! Boom! Boom!", the catchphrase of the children's television character, Basil Brush. When a full orchestra flourish is to be indicated as a sting, it sometimes is written or spoken as, ta da! or ta da— as an interjection.

In the context of percussion, rimshot normally refers to a single stroke of the stick in which the rim and head of a drum are both struck simultaneously by the same stick, creating an accent. A rimshot in this context is only a component of the sting, and does not appear at all in some stings.

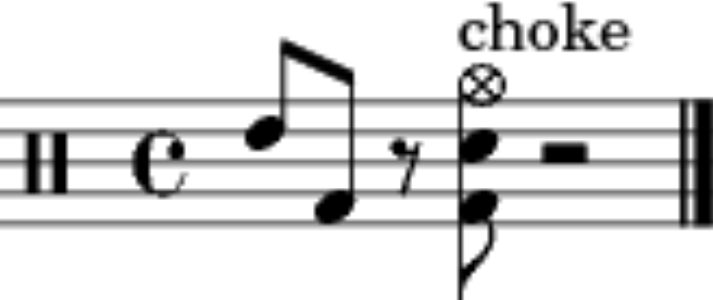
An advanced sting in percussion notation

Common stings may feature a short roll followed by a crash or splash cymbal and kick drum, a flam, or a rimshot. The notation shown here is an advanced example that uses a tom then kick, followed by a pause to put the final stroke offbeat, and a final stroke using both the snare and kick drums to support a one-handed cymbal choke, meaning all three are hit at once.

== More general use of the term ==
In broadcasting, the term sting refers to any short musical sequence used for punctuation, for example to introduce a commercial break during a television news program. Such stings commonly use a full orchestra rather than just percussion, and in television may be backed by a short video sequence.

== See also ==
- Stab (music), an element of music composition in some ways similar to a sting.
- Foley (filmmaking), the more general use of sounds for punctuation in film.
