= Rimshot =

Percussion technique

A rimshot is a percussion technique used to produce an accented snare drum stroke. The sound is produced by simultaneously hitting the rim and head of the drum with a drum stick.

== The sound and various techniques ==
The sound of a rimshot can be described as "part normal snare and part loud, woody accent", or "generally sharper, brighter and more cutting [than a standard accent]", since the technique produces large amounts of overtones.

The stroke is used on the snare in rock, pop, jazz, and blues and on the tom-toms in Afro-Cuban music. The technique is also common in bossa nova, ska, reggae, and rocksteady.

In marching percussion, there are three types of rimshots:

- The "normal" rimshot, which is played with the tip (bead) of the stick held about three inches (about 8 cm) in from the inner edge of the metal rim, and the opposite side of the rim percussed by the butt end of the stick. This produces a prominent, accented tone.
- The "ping shot", where the bead is struck about one inch (2.5 cm) in from the rim, with the butt end of the stick contacting the opposite edge of the rim. This produces a high-pitched sound.
- The "gock" (also spelled gawk), produced by striking the bead of the drum stick at the center of the drum while the rim is struck with the opposite end of the stick (near the hand). This makes a lower sound.

In Latin percussion, timbales players use rimshots near the edge of the head, but these sound very different from gocks in marching percussion.

In orchestral percussion, a rimshot is performed by placing one drum stick with the stick head near the middle of the drumhead, and the shaft pressed against the rim, and striking with the other stick. This produces a less powerful sound, and is easier to execute than a typical rimshot. This variation is also known as a "stick shot".

=== Cross stick technique ===
The rimshot is often confused with the cross stick technique, in which the tip of a drum stick is placed on the head near one of the bearing edges and the shaft of the stick is struck against the rim opposite the tip, thus creating a dry, high-pitched "click" similar to a set of claves. As a result, the stroke is frequently used in bossa nova to imitate the sound of claves; it is also used for ballads in rock, pop, and country music.

== More general use of the term ==
The musical phrase played on percussion instruments used to punctuate jokes is known in percussion jargon as a sting. This is often called a rimshot, although some versions of it do not include a rimshot in the technical sense.

A drum and cymbal punchline sting

A rimshot when used to accent the punchline of a joke being told by a live comedian may or may not be played with a small follow-up cymbal crash. Sometimes, the comedian would react to the rimshot as if they did not expect it and in doing so, pass the reaction and responsibility for the rimshot on to the drummer, when in fact, the comedian had previously instructed the drummer when to use and when not to use the rimshot. Despite having previously been scripted into the routine by the comedian, these were designed to appear to be improvised by the drummer, so as to accentuate the joke.
