= Roadkill (wrestler) =

American professional wrestler (born 1976)

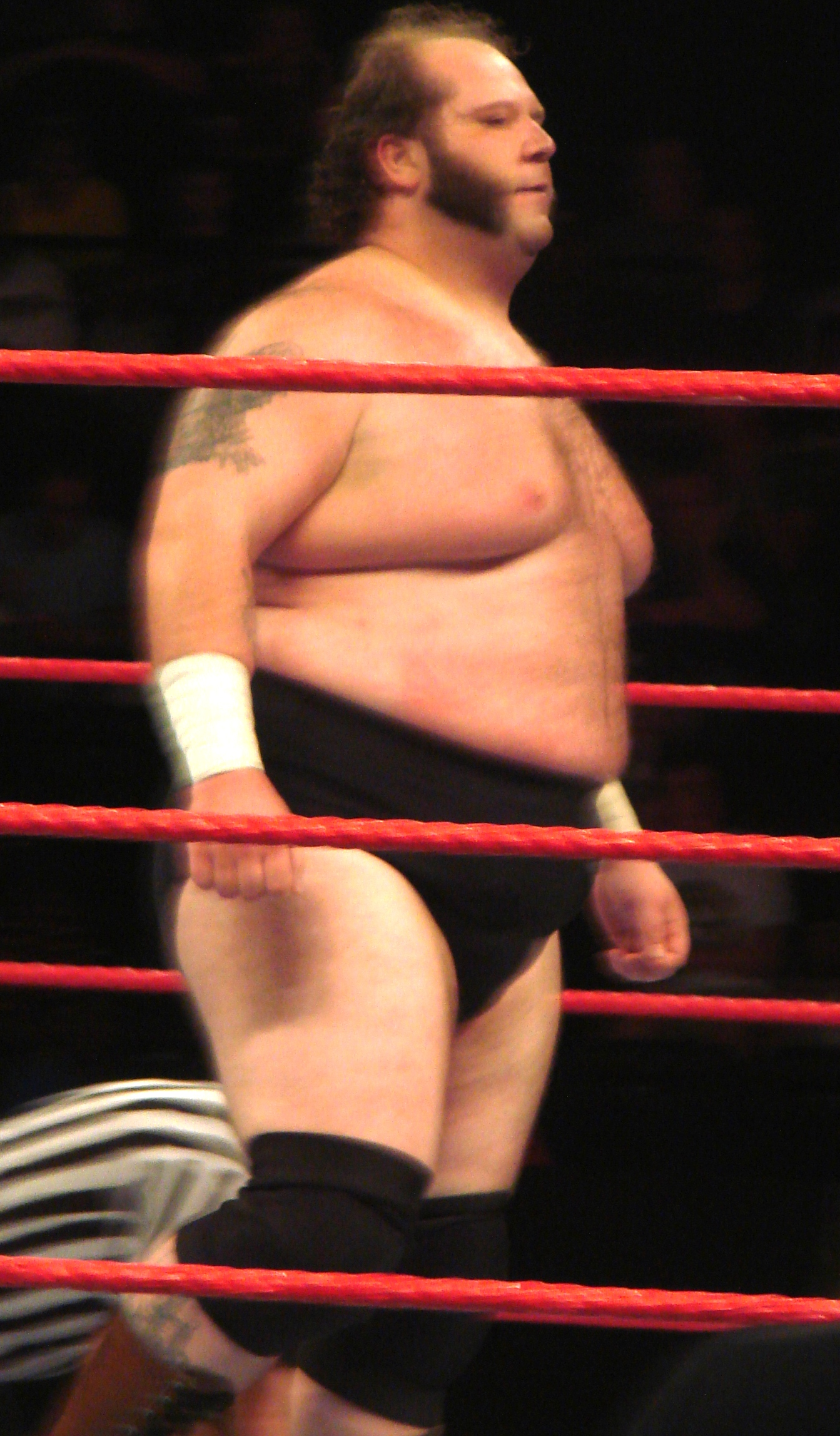
- Roadkill wrestling in WWE, 2007

Personal information
- Born: Michael DePoli; August 10, 1976 (age 49) Baton Rouge, Louisiana, U.S.

Professional wrestling career
- Ring name(s): Amish Roadkill; Antoni Polaski; Braddock; Roadkill; Tony Braddock
- Billed height: 6 ft 0 in (183 cm)
- Billed weight: 323 lb (147 kg)
- Billed from: Lancaster, Pennsylvania
- Trained by: Tazz; Perry Saturn; House of Hardcore
- Debut: 1996
- Retired: 2012

Michael DePoli (born August 10, 1976) is an American retired professional wrestler. He is best known for his appearances in Extreme Championship Wrestling under the ring name Roadkill, where he wore traditional Amish dress and was billed from Lancaster, Pennsylvania, an area with a large Amish population.

== Professional wrestling career ==
=== Extreme Championship Wrestling (1996–2001) ===
Roadkill was trained by Taz and Perry Saturn at the House of Hardcore in 1996. Once his training was complete, he joined the ECW roster, and had his first professional match on October 18, 1996 in LuLu Temple in Plymouth Meeting, Pennsylvania against Taz.

In December 1997, Roadkill formed an unlikely tag team with his fellow House of Hardcore graduate, Danny Doring. They were managed by Miss Congeniality until she left ECW in 1999 to join the World Wrestling Federation, and then by Elektra until she turned on them in 2000.

Doring and Roadkill quickly embarked on a two-year-long feud with Nova and Chris Chetti. This was followed by a series of feuds with the Impact Players (Lance Storm and Justin Credible), Simon Diamond and Johnny Swinger, Joey Matthews and Christian York, and then Tommy Dreamer and Raven. The team won the ECW World Tag Team Championships on December 3, 2000, at the Massacre on 34th Street pay-per-view, defeating Tony Mamaluke and Little Guido. They held the titles until ECW declared bankruptcy on April 4, 2001. Doring and Roadkill were the last team to hold the ECW Tag Team Titles. Roadkill made an appearance in 2001 on The Real World: Back to New York, confronting cast member Mike Mizanin's wrestling character The Miz, while in the Amish Roadkill character, about his wrestling antics.

=== Independent circuit (2001–2005) ===
After ECW folded, Doring and Roadkill wrestled dark matches for World Wrestling Entertainment. They appeared against fellow ECW originals The Full Blooded Italians (Little Guido and Tony Mamaluke) in early 2001 at Madison Square Garden.

Roadkill and Doring wrestled on three Total Nonstop Action Wrestling pay per views when TNA was running weekly pay per views back in early 2002. They wrestled Simon Diamond and Johnny Swinger, twice winning a non-title match but losing the match for the NWA World Tag Team Championship. In their last TNA appearance, they wrestled Ekmo Fatu and Sonny Siaki. On December 28, 2002 Roadkill made his debut in Pro-Pain Pro Wrestling (3PW) defeating Rockin' Rebel. On December 27, 2003 he formed a team with The Blue Meanie but would lose that night against Mike Kruel and Monsta Mack. On April 17, 2004 they would be defeated by Jack Victory and Rockin' Rebel and after the match Roadkill turned on the Blue Meanie because Commissioner Raven had told him that he was a shell of his former self. He would then face Blue Meanie in the next two shows (managed by Jasmin St. Claire) defeating him on May 15, 2004 and losing to him on June 19. After the second match The Pitbulls showed up to support Roadkill but would turn on him with St. Claire after the match. Roadkill would then win three singles matches on August 21 and January 15 and February 19, 2005. Because of this singles success he would get a shot at the 3PW Heavyweight Championship against Wagner Brown on March 19 and April 9, 2005 but would be on the losing end of both those matches. However, on May 21, 2005 he defeated Brown in a Triple Threat Match that also included Simon Diamond to become the new 3PW Heavyweight Champion.

=== World Wrestling Entertainment (2005–2008) ===
Doring and Roadkill were defeated by MNM on July 21, 2005 in a match taped for WWE's Velocity.

Roadkill appeared at the WWE promoted ECW reunion show, ECW One Night Stand on June 12, 2005. He signed a contract with WWE and was sent to Ohio Valley Wrestling. Roadkill would continue his work with OVW and on April 5, 2006 he won the promotion's Southern Tag Team Titles with Kasey James by defeating Deuce 'n Domino and Kenny and Mikey of The Spirit Squad in a three way tag team match. While in OVW during their run as a team they picked up Michelle McCool as a valet. On the May 5, 2006 edition of SmackDown, Roadkill and James would lose to William Regal and Sylvain Grenier in a tag team dark match. They would lose the Tag Titles to Shad Gaspard and The Neighborhoodie on May 24, ending their 58-day reign as Tag Team Champions.

On the June 13 edition of ECW, Roadkill took part in a battle royal (with the winner facing John Cena at Vengeance) but was eliminated by Big Show before it was eventually won by Sabu.

Two weeks later, on the June 27 edition of ECW he faced Sabu in an Extreme Rules Match in which he lost by tapping out to the camel clutch. On the July 4 edition of ECW, Roadkill defeated Tony Mamaluke in a dark match.

He then returned to OVW where he would feud with his former partner Kasey James trading victories in tag and singles matches until James was called up to the main roster. Roadkill was then moved back up to the main roster on August 1 in a dark match loss against Stevie Richards.

After a near six-month hiatus from WWE and OVW TV, Roadkill made his return to OVW on February 17, 2007 as Braddock losing to Shawn Spears. On February 21 at the OVW TV Tapings, he defeated Mike Tolar in a dark match in which his name was tweaked to Tony Braddock. Over the next four weeks he would defeat jobbers in dark matches at OVW tapings. He would continue his win streak defeating Chris Rombola in a televised match. However, this would end as he would be defeated by Nick Nemeth in a 3-Way match that also involved Jacob Duncan.

After an 8-month hiatus from WWE TV he returned under the name of "Antoni Polaski" and defeated Val Venis on the April 30 edition of Raw in a match taped for Heat and on the May 4 edition of SmackDown he would defeat Funaki in a match taped for Velocity.

He would then return to OVW at the TV Tapings on May 9 defeating Mike Hutter in a dark match. On May 30 at the TV Tapings, Polaski was entered into a tournament to see who would face The Miz at Six Flags on June 8. Polaski would defeat Chet the Jett in the first round and Jake Hager in the semifinals but lose to Atlas DaBone in the final round.

On June 13 at the OVW TV Tapings, Polaski would defeat Chet the Jett to earn the right to challenge Santino Marella for the Intercontental Championship in his first major WWE Title match. On June 22 at OVW Six Flags, he would challenge Marella for the title.

After this Polaski began participating in $2500 Bodyslam Challenges, where if someone could Bodyslam him, he would give them $2500. After defeating jobbers, Jacob Duncan beat him by disqualification thus starting a feud between the two. On July 18 at the OVW TV Tapings, he and Duncan participated in an OVW Royal Rumble to see who would fight John Cena at OVW Six Flags on July 17, but it was won by Shawn Spears. Polaski would defeat Duncan three times in a $2500 Bodyslam Challenge but on August 10 at OVW Six Flags, Duncan would become the first person to defeat Polaski in such a challenge. They would continue to feud with indecisive endings like disqualification and double count outs until they had their final match on October 31 at OVW TV Tapings where Duncan defeated Polaski in a Halloween Hardcore Match.

He would then start to team with Vladimir Kozlov with moderate success before going back to singles matches. His last match on OVW TV was on January 2, 2008, where he defeated Lupe Viscara. He would then have his final match for WWE challenging OVW Heavyweight Champion Matt Sydal for the title at a house show in a losing effort.

Roadkill was released from WWE on February 4, 2008. When Depoli was released from WWE, he retired from professional wrestling.

=== House of Hardcore (2012) ===
On October 6, 2012, 4 years after being released from WWE, Roadkill wrestled again with Doring, defeating F.B.I. in the first House of Hardcore show.

== Professional wrestling style and persona ==
Roadkill used the character of an Amish from Lancaster, Pennsylvania, known by the nicknames "The Angry Amish Warrior", "The Angry Amish Chicken Plucker" and "The Killmeister" and used Soul Coughing's song "Super Bon Bon" as his entrance theme song in ECW.

== Championships and accomplishments ==
- Extreme Championship Wrestling
  - ECW World Tag Team Championship (1 time) - with Danny Doring
- Ohio Valley Wrestling
  - OVW Southern Tag Team Championship (1 time) - with Kasey James
- Pro-Pain Pro Wrestling
  - 3PW World Heavyweight Championship (1 time)
