= Anarchy Rulz =

- Promotions: Extreme Championship Wrestling
- First event: Anarchy Rulz (1999)
- Last event: Anarchy Rulz (2000)

Anarchy Rulz was a professional wrestling pay-per-view (PPV) event produced by Extreme Championship Wrestling (ECW) annually in 1999 and 2000.

== Dates, venues and main events ==
Event	Date	City	Venue	Main event
Anarchy Rulz (1999)	September 19, 1999	Villa Park, Illinois	Odeum Expo Center	Rob Van Dam (c) vs. Balls Mahoney for the ECW World Television Championship
Anarchy Rulz (2000)	October 1, 2000	Saint Paul, Minnesota	Roy Wilkins Auditorium	Justin Credible (c) vs. Jerry Lynn for the ECW World Heavyweight Championship
(c) – refers to the champion(s) heading into the match
