= Billy Wiles =

American professional wrestler (born 1971)

Personal information
- Born: William Wiles; 1971 (age 54–55) Brick Township, New Jersey, United States

Professional wrestling career
- Ring name(s): Belvis Wesley; Bill Wiles; Bill Wyles; Billy Wiles; Bilvis Wesley; Nomad
- Billed height: 6 ft 1 in (1.85 m)
- Billed weight: 240 lb (110 kg)
- Trained by: Larry Sharpe
- Debut: 1996
- Retired: 2017

William Wiles (born 1971) is an American professional wrestler, better known by the ring names "Beautiful" Billy Wiles and Bilvis Wesley. He is best known for his appearances in Extreme Championship Wrestling in the late 1990s and early 2000s, where he was part of the New Dangerous Alliance, often teaming with C. W. Anderson.

== Professional wrestling career ==
=== Early career (1996-1997) ===
Prior to first wrestling in a ring, Wiles was once a timekeeper.

=== Extreme Championship Wrestling (1997-2001) ===
Wiles became a construction worker within Extreme Championship Wrestling, building up rings and working as a hauler backstage. Eventually he worked his way into the sport and his first known match in ECW was against Axl Rotten in a house show in Waltham, Massachusetts, in a losing effort. He wrestled Sabu, Louie Spicolli and Balls Mahoney, but failed to defeat them. Wiles challenged Taz for the ECW World Television Championship in a singles match in the same venue in Waltham, Massachusetts to a losing effort.

Wiles would work alongside Lou E. Dangerously's New Dangerous Alliance, teaming up with C. W. Anderson, proceeding to feud against Roadkill and Danny Doring and The Hardcore Chair Swingin' Freaks (Balls Mahoney and Axl Rotten). The brink of the feud with Roadkill and Doring happened at ECW Living Dangerously. Doring and Roadkill's manager Elektra turned on them, allowing Anderson and Wiles to pick up the win.

Wiles left the Dangerous Alliance after Cyberslam 2000 as a singles competitor, facing Nova, Michael Shane and Steve Corino in several matches on ECW Hardcore TV and ECW on TNN tapings. He formed a tag team with "The Prodigy" Tom Marquez dubbed as the Sideshow Freaks. They fought Doring and Roadkill, and Christian York and Joey Matthews. The team would eventually split up. Wiles wrestled at the final Extreme Championship Wrestling pay-per-view event Guilty as Charged, defeating Mike Bell in a dark match.

Wiles appeared in the video game ECW Hardcore Revolution as Wild Bill.

=== Late career (2001-2017) ===
After ECW folded in 2001, Wiles worked in the independents. Wiles appeared at the Legends of the Arena event at The Arena in Philadelphia on June 27, 2009, winning a match against The Musketeer, using New Jack's theme song for distraction. He last his last match in 2017.

Wiles now trains talent at the Monster Factory in Paulsboro, New Jersey with Danny Cage and The Blue Meanie.

== Personal life ==
Prior to becoming a wrestler, Wiles was a drummer for a local band. He was good friends with fellow wrestler Balls Mahoney, whom he met during his sophomore year of high school. He cites Roddy Piper as his favorite wrestler.

== Championships and accomplishments ==
- Monster Factory Pro Wrestling
  - MFPW Tag Team Championship (1 time) – with Joe Gibson
