= Angel Medina (wrestler) =

American professional wrestler

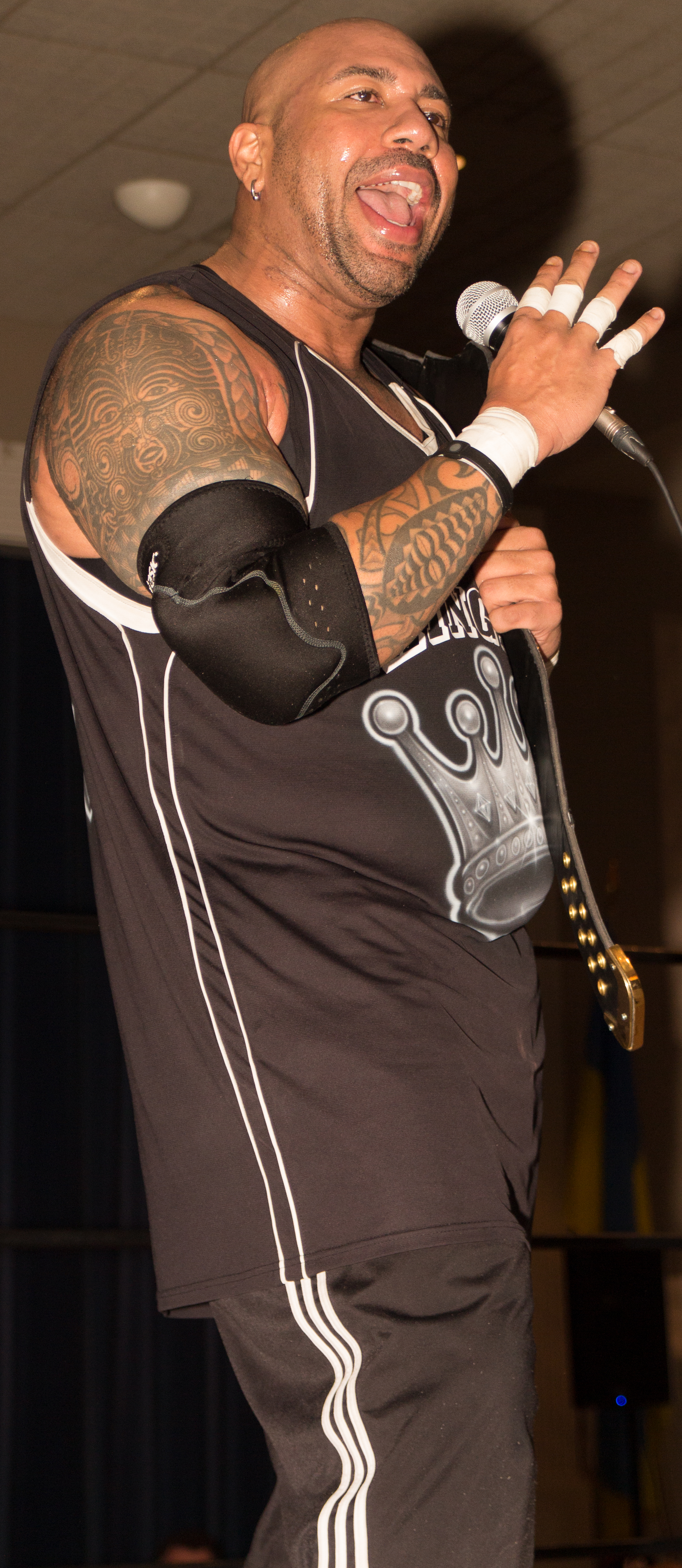
- Medina in 2013

Personal information
- Born: February 28, 1972 (age 54) New York City, U.S.

Professional wrestling career
- Ring name(s): Angel; The Kingpin; Newyorkican; NY Rican Baldie; Spanish Angel
- Billed height: 6 ft 2 in (188 cm)
- Billed weight: 250 lb (113 kg)
- Billed from: "Fordham Road in The Bronx"
- Trained by: Johnny Rodz
- Debut: 1996

Angel Medina (born February 28, 1972) is an American professional wrestler, better known by the ring name Angel. He is best known for his appearances with Extreme Championship Wrestling between 1999 and 2001 as a member of Da Baldies.

== Professional wrestling career ==
At an early age, Angel relocated from New York City to Puerto Rico, where he became interested in professional wrestling. At the age of 17, Angel began training as a wrestler under Johnny Rodz. He debuted in 1996.

In the course of his career, Angel wrestled in Mexico and Japan.

In 1999, Angel worked with the now defunct LIWF on the JYD memorial show along with Kid USA, Big Vito LaGrasso and Lucifer Billy Alaimo. In the same year he joined Extreme Championship Wrestling. Wrestling under the ring name Angel, Angel formed a stable known as "Da Baldies" (apparently based on a real NY skinhead gang) with Vito LoGrasso, Tony DeVito, Vic Grimes, P. N. News and Redd Dogg. The Baldies feuded with New Jack throughout late 1999 and early 2000 over who was the "King of the Streets". This feud saw Angel defeat New Jack at the Guilty As Charged 2000 pay per view, proclaiming himself the King of the Streets, until he and New Jack faced off again in late 2000, with Jack winning, and 'reclaiming' the title. Throughout the summer of 2000, Medina and DeVito feuded with Chris Chetti and Nova, and also had a blood feud with Balls Mahoney and Chilly Willy.

After ECW declared bankruptcy in April 2001, Angel began wrestling for the Puerto Rican International Wrestling Association as "NY Rican Baldie" or "The New Yorican Baldie". Between July and September 2001, he won the IWA Hardcore Championship on seven occasions, trading the title with wrestlers such as Glamour Boy Shane and fellow ECW alumni Super Crazy and Tommy Dreamer.

Upon semi-retiring in the early 2000s, Angel became a police officer in Wichita, Kansas.

Angel has since made a return to the squared-circle on a semi-regular basis, competing in prominent Kansas City wrestling promotion, Kansas City Xtreme Wrestling throughout 2017 and 2018.

On June 29, 2024 Angel Medina defeated Big Daddy D-Roy for Great North Wrestling in Napanee, Ontario.

On May 3, 2025 at the 2300 Arena in Philadelphia, Pennsylvania Angel Medina defeated Super Crazy at TWA (Tri-State Wrestling Alliance) One & Done with Canadian wrestling promoter Jack Kilby of (Cheap Heat Productions) accompanying him as his manager

== Championships and accomplishments ==
- International Wrestling Association
  - IWA Hardcore Championship (8 times)
- Hardcore Roadtrip
  - HRT Heavyweight Championship (1 time)
