= Midtown Massacre =

2000 Extreme Championship Wrestling live event

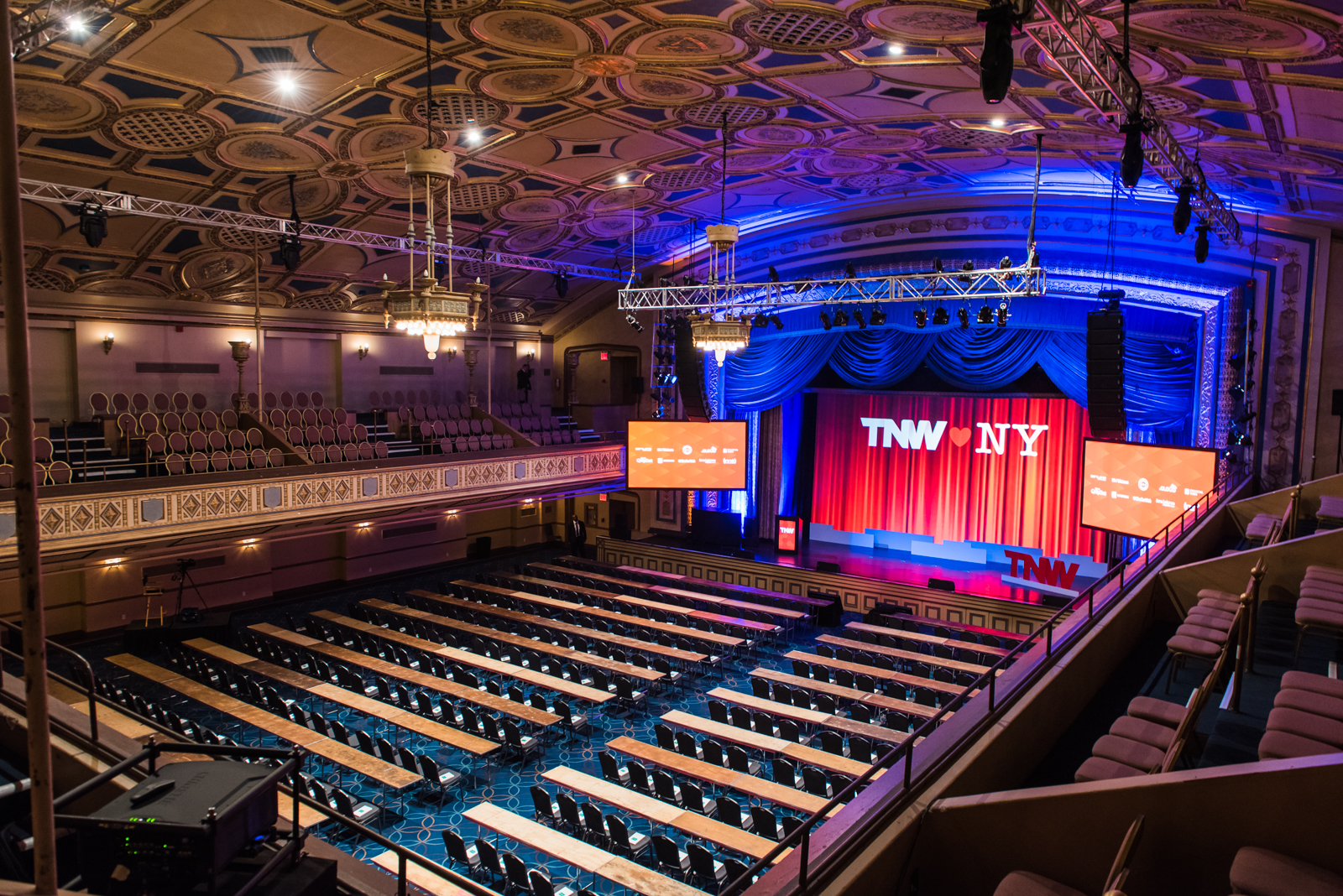
- The Hammerstein Ballroom.
- Promotion: Extreme Championship Wrestling
- Date: August 25, 2000; August 26, 2000 (aired September 1, 3, 8, 10, and 15, 2000)
- City: New York City, New York, United States
- Venue: Hammerstein Ballroom
- Attendance: c.2,500 (August 25, 2000) c.2,500 (August 26, 2000)

Event chronology
← Previous; A New Era Begins	Next → Beer, Blood, Babes and Barbed Wire

Midtown Massacre was a pair of professional wrestling live events produced by Extreme Championship Wrestling (ECW) on August 25 and August 26, 2000. The events were both held in the Hammerstein Ballroom in New York City, New York in the United States. Excerpts from Midtown Massacre aired on the television show ECW on TNN on The Nashville Network on September 1, 8, and 15, 2000 as well as on episodes #384 and #385 of the syndicated television show ECW Hardcore TV on September 3 and 10, 2000.

== August 25, 2000 ==
=== Event ===
The August 25, 2000 event featured a one-night tag team tournament for the ECW World Tag Team Championship, which had been vacant since CyberSlam in April 2000 when Justin Credible abandoned the titles after coholder Lance Storm left ECW. The tournament featured a total of 12 teams, with the three teams winning the first two rounds facing one another in a three way dance to determine the new champions.

The opening bout was a first round tournament match pitting Christian York and Joey Matthews against Hot Commodity. Hot Commodity by pinfall won the match to proceed in the tournament.

The second bout was a first round tournament match pitting Da Baldies against Danny Doring and Roadkill. Doring and Roadkill won the match to proceed in the tournament.

The third bout was a first round tournament match pitting Chris Chetti and Nova against Simon and Swinger. Simon and Swinger won the match to proceed in the tournament, pinning Chetti following a Problem Solver.

The fourth bout was a first round tournament match pitting the Full Blooded Italians against the Unholy Alliance. The Unholy Alliance won the match to proceed in the tournament, with Yoshihiro Tajiri pinning Tony Mamaluke following a diving stomp.

The fifth bout was a first round tournament match pitting Justin Credible and Rhino against Chilly Willy and the Sandman. Credible and Rhino won the match to proceed in the tournament, with Rhino pinning the Sandman following a piledriver.

The sixth bout was a first round tournament match pitting Jerry Lynn and Tommy Dreamer against Kid Kash and Rob Van Dam. Dreamer and Lynn won the match to proceed in the tournament, with Lynn pinning Van Dam following a cradle piledriver.

The seventh bout was a semi-finals tournament match pitting Hot Commodity against the Unholy Alliance. The Unholy Alliance won the match to proceed to the tournament finals, pinning Julio Dinero following a double brainbuster.

The eight bout was a semi-finals tournament match pitting Danny Doring and Roadkill against Simon and Swinger. Simon and Swinger won the match to proceed to the tournament finals when their ally C. W. Anderson interfered in the match, enabling Swinger to pin Doring.

The ninth bout was a semi-finals tournament match pitting Jerry Lynn and Tommy Dreamer against Justin Credible and Rhino. Dreamer and Lynn won the match to proceed to the tournament finals, with Lynn pinning Credible after reversing That's Incredible into a cradle piledriver.

The main event was a three way dance between Jerry Lynn and Tommy Dreamer, Simon and Swinger, and the Unholy Alliance in the finals of the tournament. Dreamer and Lynn were the first team eliminated, with Simon and Swinger pinning him following a Problem Solver. The Unholy Alliance went on to win the match when Whipwreck pinned Diamond following a second-rope Whipper-Snapper, thus becoming the new ECW World Tag Team Champions.

=== Results ===
No.	Results	Stipulations	Times
1	Hot Commodity (E. Z. Money and Julio Dinero) (with Chris Hamrick and Elektra) defeated Christian York and Joey Matthews by pinfall	Tag team match	3:57
2	Danny Doring and Roadkill defeated Da Baldies (Angel and Tony DeVito)	Tag team match	1:22
3	Simon and Swinger (with C. W. Anderson) defeated Chris Chetti and Nova by pinfall	Tag team match	4:39
4	Unholy Alliance (Mikey Whipwreck and Yoshihiro Tajiri) (with the Sinister Minister) defeated The Full Blooded Italians (Guido Maritato and Tony Mamaluke) (with Sal E. Graziano) by pinfall	Tag team match	6:31
5	Justin Credible and Rhino defeated Chilly Willy and the Sandman by pinfall	Tag team match	1:15
6	Jerry Lynn and Tommy Dreamer defeated Kid Kash and Rob Van Dam (with Bill Alfonso) by pinfall	Tag team match	14:24
7	The Unholy Alliance (Mikey Whipwreck and Yoshihiro Tajiri) defeated Hot Commodity (E. Z. Money and Julio Dinero) by pinfall	Tag team match	6:41
8	Simon and Swinger defeated Danny Doring and Roadkill by pinfall	Tag team match	5:06
9	Jerry Lynn and Tommy Dreamer defeated Justin Credible (with Francine) and Rhino by pinfall	Tag team match	4:51
10	The Unholy Alliance (Mikey Whipwreck and Yoshihiro Tajiri) (with the Sinister Minister) defeated Jerry Lynn and Tommy Dreamer and Simon and Swinger (with C. W. Anderson)	Three way dance for the ECW World Tag Team Championship	11:38

== August 26, 2000 ==
=== Event ===
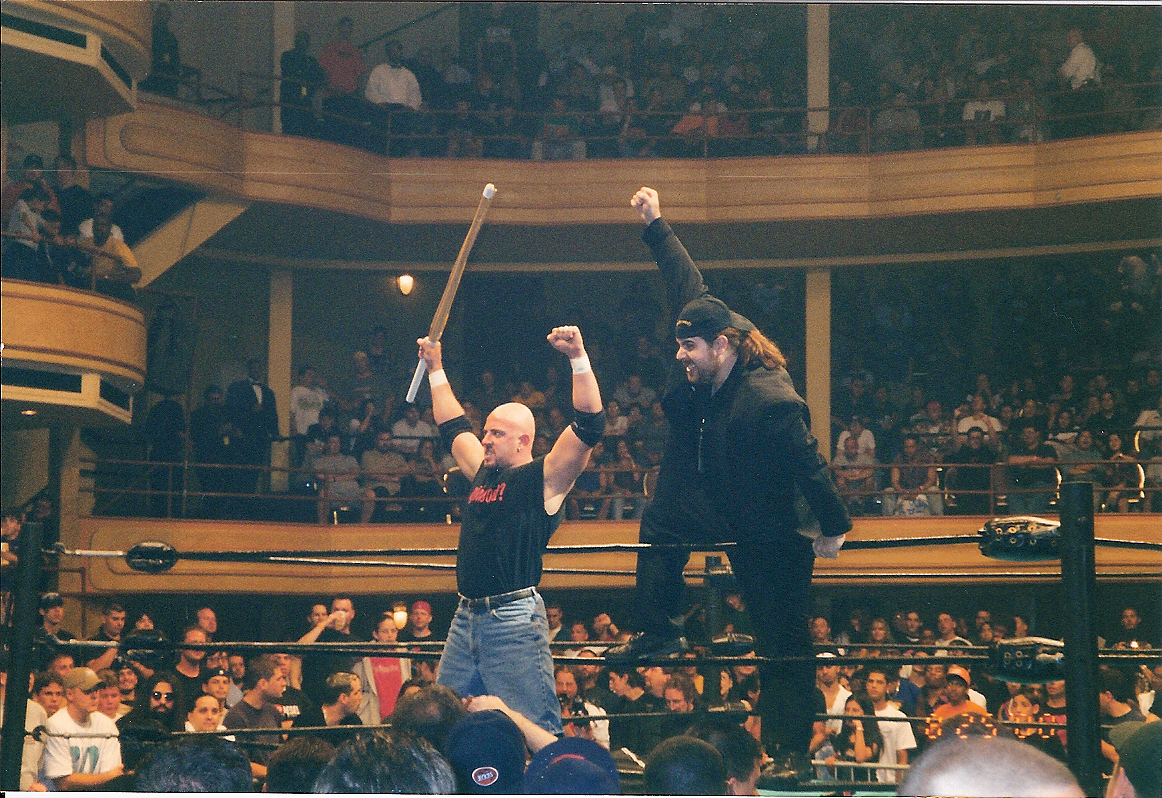
Justin Credible (left) and Sign Guy Dudley (right) in the Hammerstein Ballroom at Midtown Massacre.

The opening bout was a singles match between Balls Mahoney and the Blue Boy. Mahoney won the match, pinning the Blue Boy following a chair shot. Following the match, the Blue Boy's valet Jasmin St. Claire gave Mahoney chair shots until he gave her a Nutcracker Suite.

The second bout saw ECW World Tag Team Champions the Unholy Alliance defend their titles against the Full Blooded Italians. The Full Blooded Italians defeated the Unholy Alliance to win the ECW World Tag Team Championship, with Guido Maritato pinning Yoshihiro Tajiri following a Kiss of Death.

The third bout was a singles match between Psicosis and Tony DeVito. The match was won by Psicosis.

The fourth bout was a six-man tag team match pitting Christian York, Joey Matthews, and Tommy Dreamer against Hot Commodity. The match was won by Dreamer, Matthews, and York.

The fifth bout was a singles match between C. W. Anderson and Jerry Lynn. The match was won by Anderson with assistance from corrupt referee Danny Daniels.

The sixth bout was a three way dance between Chris Chetti and Nova, Danny Doring and Roadkill, and Simon and Swinger. Chetti and Nova were the first team eliminated, with Simon Diamond pinning Nova after Chetti turned on him by giving him a chair shot. Doring and Roadkill went on to win the match, pinning Swinger following a Buggy Bang.

The seventh bout saw ECW World Heavyweight Champion Justin Credible defend his title against Steve Corino. Credible defeated Corino to retain his title, pinning him after giving him That's Incredible onto a steel chair.

The eighth bout was a singles match between Rob Van Dam and Scotty Anton in a rematch from Heat Wave. The match was won by Van Dam, who pinned Anton following a Five Star Frog Splash.

The main event saw ECW World Television Champion Rhino defend his title against Kid Kash. The match ended when Rob Van Dam interfered in the match, with Van Dam and Kash giving Rhino a simultaneous Five Star Frog Splash and diving leg drop, enabling Kash to pin Rhino and win the Championship.

=== Results ===
No.	Results	Stipulations	Times
1	Balls Mahoney defeated the Blue Boy (with Jasmin St. Claire) by pinfall	Singles match	4:31
2	The Full Blooded Italians (Guido Maritato and Tony Mamaluke) defeated the Unholy Alliance (Mikey Whipwreck and Yoshihiro Tajiri) (c) (with the Sinister Minister) by pinfall	Tag team match for the ECW World Tag Team Championship	11:30
3	Psicosis defeated Tony DeVito	Singles match	9:12
4	Christian York, Joey Matthews, and Tommy Dreamer defeated Hot Commodity (Chris Hamrick, E. Z. Money, and Julio Dinero	Six-man tag team match	10:02
5	C. W. Anderson defeated Jerry Lynn	Singles match	8:35
6	Danny Doring and Roadkill defeated Chris Chetti and Nova and Simon and Swinger	Three way dance	10:02
7	Justin Credible (c) (with Francine) defeated Steve Corino (with Dawn Marie) by pinfall	Singles match for the ECW World Heavyweight Championship	14:26
8	Rob Van Dam (with Bill Alfonso) defeated Scotty Anton	Singles match	15:20
9	Kid Kash defeated Rhino (c) by pinfall	Singles match for the ECW World Television Championship	2:59
(c) / – the champion(s) heading into the match
