= List of ECW World Television Champions =

Listing of professional wrestling champions for the ECW World Television Championship

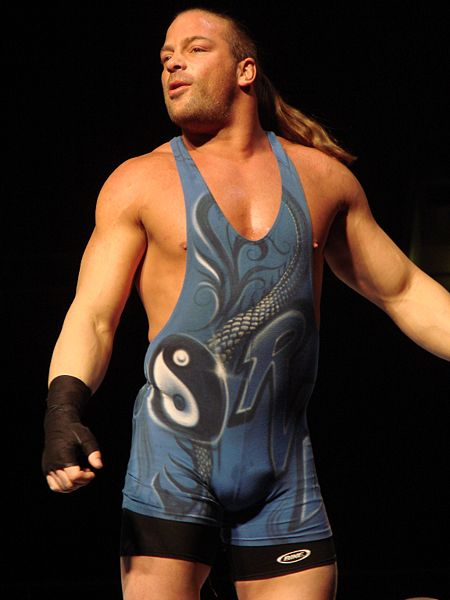
Rob Van Dam is the longest reigning champion at 700 days.

The ECW World Television Championship was a professional wrestling television championship contested for in Extreme Championship Wrestling (ECW). It was the secondary title of ECW.

Originally, ECW was a member of the National Wrestling Alliance (NWA), an organization with many member promotions. ECW withdrew as an NWA member in 1994. The championship remained active until April 2001, when ECW filed for bankruptcy. All of ECW's assets were later purchased by World Wrestling Entertainment (WWE) in mid-2003, including the copyrights to ECW's championships. In May 2006, WWE extended its promotion by adding ECW as a third additional brand, the others being Raw and SmackDown, in a brand extension. The ECW World Heavyweight Championship was the only former ECW title to be recommissioned by WWE for the new brand. While this championship remains decommissioned, its records are under the name "ECW Television Championship" on the official WWE website.

Title reigns were determined by professional wrestling matches, often contested under hardcore wrestling regulations, with wrestlers involved in pre-existing scripted feuds, plots and storylines or were awarded the title due to scripted circumstances. Wrestlers were portrayed as either villains or heroes as they followed a series of tension-building events, which culminated in a match or series of matches for the championship.

As implied by its name, the championship could only be won on television or on pay-per-view events. The title was won in one Canadian municipality and in five American states. The inaugural champion was Johnny Hotbody, who defeated Larry Winters at a live event to win the title in August 1992. Rhino, who won the title in September 2000, was the final wrestler to hold the title before ECW filed for bankruptcy. 2 Cold Scorpio had the most reigns as champion, with four. At 700 days, Rob Van Dam's reign from 1998 to 2000 was the longest in the title's history. The Tazmaniac and 2 Cold Scorpio's reigns in 1994 were the shortest title reigns at less than one day. Overall, there were 31 title reigns.

== Reigns ==
=== Names ===
Name	Years
ECW Television Championship	August 12, 1992 – September 18, 1993
NWA-ECW Television Championship	September 18, 1993 - August 27, 1994
ECW World Television Championship	August 27, 1994 – April 11, 2001

=== Reigns ===
Key
No.	Overall reign number
Reign	Reign number for the specific champion
Days	Number of days held
Defenses	Number of successful defenses
N/A	Unknown information
<1	Reign lasted less than a day

No.	Champion	Championship change			Reign statistics			Notes	Ref.
No.	Champion	Date	Event	Location	Reign	Days	Defenses	Notes	Ref.
1	Johnny Hotbody	August 12, 1992	Live event	Philadelphia, PA	1	31	N/A	Defeated Larry Winters for the vacant championship. Following outside interference; Hot Body originally won the match via disqualification after Winters hit referee John Finnegan but Tod Gordon ordered the match to continue; due to pre-match stipulations.	
—	Vacated	September 12, 1992	—	—	—	—	—	Johnny Hotbody legitimately injured his ankle, and as a result, ECW forced him to relinquish the title.	
†	Glen Osbourne (Note: This title change was excluded from the title history published by World Wrestling Entertainment.)	September 30, 1992	Live event	Philadelphia, PA	–	(Note: This reign lasted between 124 and 151 days.)	N/A	Defeated Mr. Sandman for the vacant Championship.	
—	Vacated	February 1993	—	—	—	—	—	ECW forced Glen Osbourne to vacate the title to set it up to be defended in a tournament after beginning its television show Hardcore TV.	
2	Jimmy Snuka	March 12, 1993	Hardcore TV	Radnor, PA	1	203	N/A	Defeated Glen Osbourne in a tournament final. Aired on April 19, 1993, via broadcast delay.	
3	Terry Funk	October 1, 1993	NWA Bloodfest: Part 1	Philadelphia, PA	1	43	N/A	Aired on October 5, 1993, episode of Hardcore TV via broadcast delay.	
4	Sabu	November 13, 1993	November to Remember	Philadelphia, PA	1	113	N/A	This was a tag team match featuring Sabu and Road Warrior Hawk against Terry Funk and King Kong Bundy, with Sabu's ECW Heavyweight Championship also on the line.	
5	The Tazmaniac	March 5, 1994	Hardcore TV	Philadelphia, PA	1	1	N/A	Aired on March 15, 1994, via broadcast delay.	
6	J.T. Smith	March 6, 1994	Hardcore TV	Philadelphia, PA	1	41	N/A	Aired on March 22, 1994, via broadcast delay.	
7	The Pitbull	April 16, 1994	Live event	Philadelphia, PA	1	27	N/A		
8	Mikey Whipwreck	May 13, 1994	Hardcore TV	Philadelphia, PA	1	92	N/A	Aired on May 17, 1994, via broadcast delay.	
9	Jason	August 13, 1994	Hardcore Heaven	Philadelphia, PA	1	83	N/A	Aired on August 16, 1994, episode of Hardcore TV via broadcast delay.	
10	2 Cold Scorpio	November 3, 1994	Hardcore TV	Hamburg, PA	1	1	N/A	Aired on November 22, 1994, via broadcast delay.	
11	Dean Malenko	November 4, 1994	Hardcore TV	Hamburg, PA	1	134	N/A	Aired on November 29, 1994, via broadcast delay.	
12	2 Cold Scorpio	March 18, 1995	Extreme Warfare	Philadelphia, PA	2	21	N/A	Aired on March 21, 1995, via broadcast delay.	
13	Eddie Guerrero	April 8, 1995	Three Way Dance	Philadelphia, PA	1	104	N/A	Aired on April 11, 1995, episode of Hardcore TV via broadcast delay.	
14	Dean Malenko	July 21, 1995	Hardcore TV	Tampa, FL	2	7	N/A	Aired on August 1, 1995, via broadcast delay.	
15	Eddie Guerrero	July 28, 1995	Hardcore TV	Middletown, NY	2	28	N/A	Aired on August 8, 1995, via broadcast delay.	
16	2 Cold Scorpio	August 25, 1995	Live event	Jim Thorpe, PA	3	126	N/A		
17	Mikey Whipwreck	December 29, 1995	Holiday Hell	New York, NY	2	7	N/A	This was a match where Scorpio put both his World Television Championship and the ECW World Tag Team Championship held by Scorpio and The Sandman on the line.	
18	2 Cold Scorpio	January 5, 1996	House Party	Philadelphia, PA	4	127	N/A		
19	Shane Douglas	May 11, 1996	A Matter of Respect	Philadelphia, PA	1	21	N/A		
20	Pitbull #2	June 1, 1996	Fight the Power	Philadelphia, PA	1	21	N/A		
21	Chris Jericho	June 22, 1996	Hardcore Heaven	Philadelphia, PA	1	21	N/A		
22	Shane Douglas	July 13, 1996	Heat Wave	Philadelphia, PA	2	329	30	This was a four-way dance also involving Pitbull #2 and 2 Cold Scorpio. Aired on July 23, 1996, episode of Hardcore TV via broadcast delay.	
23	Taz	June 7, 1997	Wrestlepalooza	Philadelphia, PA	2	267	43		
24	Bam Bam Bigelow	March 1, 1998	Living Dangerously	Asbury Park, NJ	1	34	5		
25	Rob Van Dam	April 4, 1998	Hardcore TV	Buffalo, NY	1	700	121	Aired on April 8, 1998, via broadcast delay.	
—	Vacated	March 4, 2000	—	Philadelphia, PA	—	—	—	Rob Van Dam was legitimately injured, and as a result, The Network forced him to relinquish the title.	
26	Super Crazy	March 12, 2000	Living Dangerously	Danbury, CT	1	27	8	Defeated Rhino in a tournament final.	
27	Yoshihiro Tajiri	April 8, 2000	ECW on TNN	Buffalo, NY	1	14	1	Aired on April 14, 2000, via broadcast delay.	
28	Rhino	April 22, 2000	CyberSlam	Philadelphia, PA	1	126	11		
29	Kid Kash	August 26, 2000	Midtown Massacre	New York, NY	1	14	2	Aired on September 8, 2000 on ECW on TNN, via broadcast delay.	
30	Rhino	September 9, 2000	ECW on TNN	Mississauga, ON	2	214	10	Rhino was the final wrestler to hold the title. Aired on September 21, 2000, via broadcast delay.	
—	Deactivated	April 11, 2001	—	—	—	—	—	ECW closed on April 4, 2001, and World Wrestling Entertainment purchased its assets in 2003.	
†	Matt Cardona (Note: This title change is not recognized by WWE.)	January 14, 2022	GCW Most Notorious	—	1	1	1	Cardona defeated Rhino for the championship. The next day he threw the title into a garbage can. This reign is not recognized since WWE owns the rights to the title.	

== Combined reigns ==
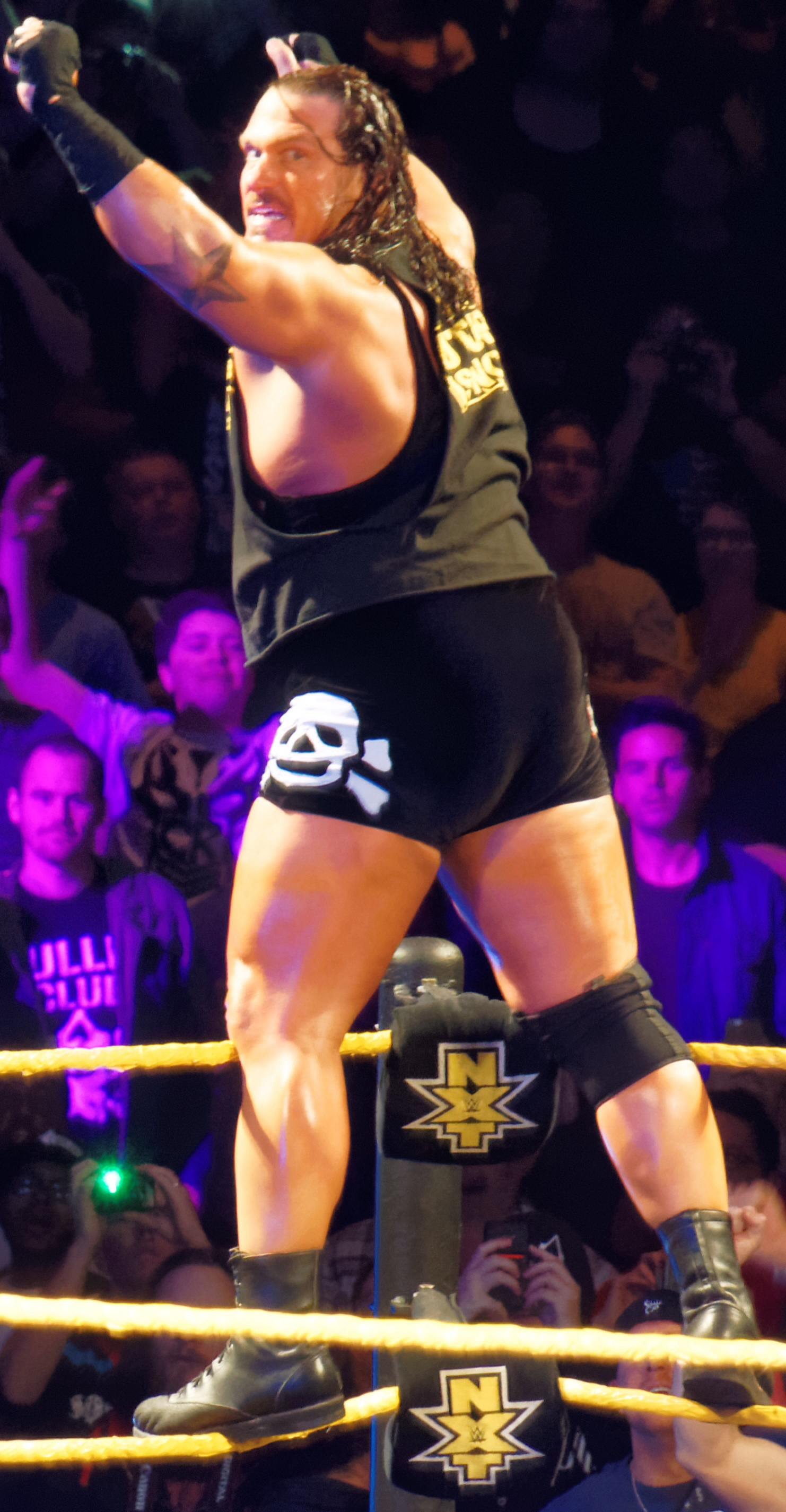
Two-time and final champion Rhyno

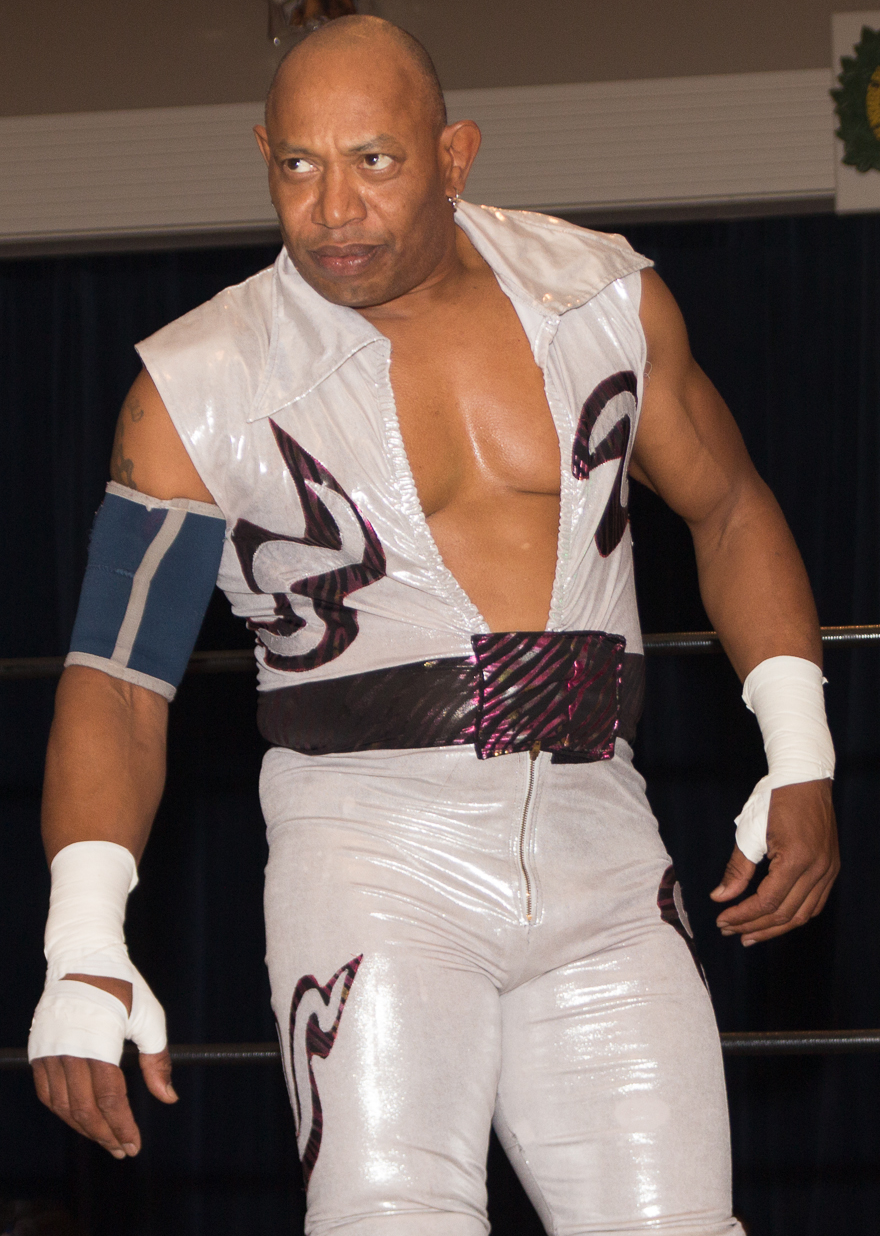
Record four-time champion 2 Cold Scorpio

Rank	Wrestler	No. of reigns	Combined days	Combined days rec. by WWE
1	Rob Van Dam	1	700	700
2	Shane Douglas	2	350	348
3	Rhino	2	340	338
4	2 Cold Scorpio	4	274	271
5	Taz	2	267	266
6	Jimmy Snuka	1	203	202
7	Dean Malenko	2	141	139
8	Eddie Guerrero	2	132	130
—	Glen Osbourne	—	124 - 151	—
9	Sabu	1	113	
10	Mikey Whipwreck	2	99	97
11	Jason	1	83	82
12	Terry Funk	1	43	42
13	J.T. Smith	1	41	9
14	Bam Bam Bigelow	1	34	33
15	Johnny Hotbody	1	31	30
16	The Pitbull	1	27	26
16	Super Crazy	1	27	26
18	Pitbull #2	1	21	20
18	Chris Jericho	1	21	20
20	Kid Kash	1	14	13
20	Yoshihiro Tajiri	1	14	13
—	Matt Cardona	—	1	—
