= Massacre on 34th Street =

2000 Extreme Championship Wrestling pay-per-view event

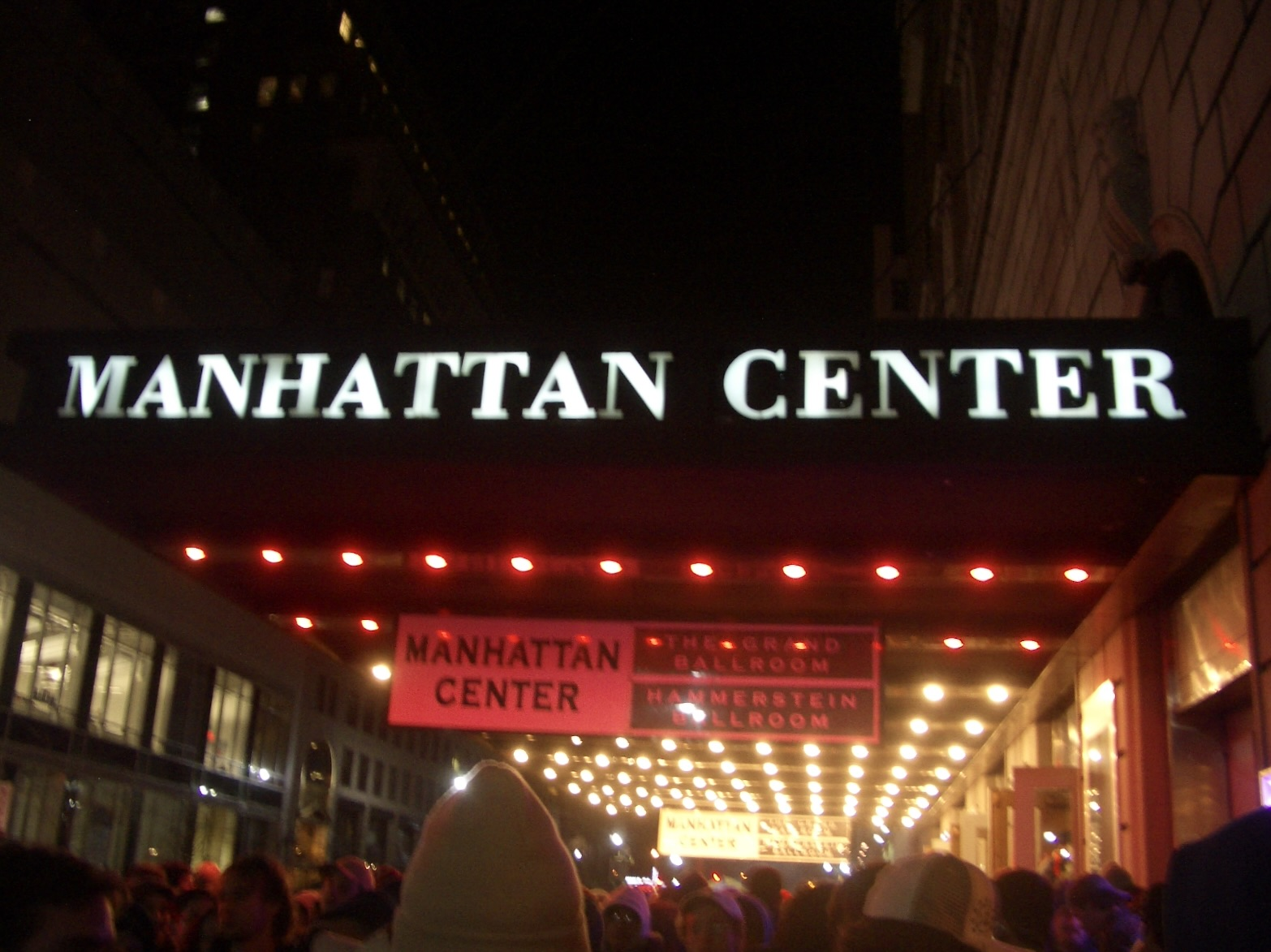
- The Hammerstein Ballroom in New York City, New York.
- Promotion: Extreme Championship Wrestling
- Date: December 3, 2000
- City: New York City, New York
- Venue: Hammerstein Ballroom
- Attendance: 2,600
- Buy rate: 55,000

Pay-per-view chronology
← Previous; November to Remember	Next → Guilty as Charged

Massacre on 34th Street was a professional wrestling pay-per-view (PPV) event produced by Extreme Championship Wrestling (ECW). It took place on December 3, 2000, from the Hammerstein Ballroom in New York City, and was the penultimate pay-per-view event from ECW before the promotion's closure.

Rhino and Spike Dudley's match for the ECW World Television Championship appeared on the 2012 WWE DVD and Blu-ray set ECW Unreleased: Vol. 1.

== Background ==
The name came from the location of the event, the Hammerstein Ballroom being located on 34th Street in New York. It is also a play on words of the film Miracle on 34th Street and a reference to the April 1996 ECW event Massacre on Queens Boulevard.

== Event ==
=== Preliminary matches ===
The event kicked off with a tag team match between The Bad Street Boys (Christian York and Joey Matthews) and Simon and Swinger, which stipulated that the winning team would win the managerial services of Dawn Marie. Bad Street Boys delivered a Rebel Yell to Swinger for the win. Matthews was hurt and Marie turned on York, leaving him vulnerable to a Problem Solver by Simon and Swinger and aligning herself with Simon and Swinger.

Next, Balls Mahoney took on E. Z. Money. Hot Commodity triple teamed Mahoney as he received a neckbreaker by Julio Dinero, a Confederate Crunch by Chris Hamrick and a moonsault by Money, resulting in Money pinning Mahoney for the win. After the match, Hot Commodity continued to attack Mahoney until Nova made the save, leading to a match between Nova and Dinero. Hot Commodity interfered in the match until Mahoney cleared the ring with several chair shots. Nova delivered a high-angle senton bomb to Dinero for the win.

In the following match, The F.B.I. (Little Guido and Tony Mamaluke) defended the World Tag Team Championship against Danny Doring and Roadkill, which stipulated that Doring and Roadkill would be forced to split as a team if they failed to win the titles. Doring knocked out Mamaluke by throwing him out of the ring with a superkick and sending him face first into the front row of the audience. Guido tried to deliver a Kiss of Death to Roadkill but Roadkill avoided it and then he and Doring delivered a Buggy Bang to win the titles.

Next, Tommy Dreamer took on C. W. Anderson. After a back and forth match, Anderson delivered an Anderson Spinebuster to Dreamer through a table for the win.

Later, Rhino defended the World Television Championship against Spike Dudley. Rhino knocked Dudley out of the ring with a Gore. Dudley recovered and hit Rhino in the knee with a steel chair but Rhino grabbed him and choked him out to retain the title.

Super Crazy and his mystery tag team partner were scheduled to take on the Unholy Alliance (Yoshihiro Tajiri and Mikey Whipwreck) in the penultimate match. Unholy Alliance double teamed Crazy in the earlier moments of the match until Kid Kash showed up as Crazy's mystery tag team partner and joined the match. Tajiri hit a diving double foot stomp to Crazy on a table for the win.

=== Main event match ===
Steve Corino defended the World Heavyweight Championship against Jerry Lynn and Justin Credible in a Three-Way Dance. Credible delivered a That's Incredible to Lynn to eliminate him. The action then continued between Corino and Credible. After a back and forth match, Corino delivered an Old School Expulsion to Credible to retain the title. After the match, The Sandman attacked Jack Victory with his Singapore cane and then stole the World Heavyweight Championship title belt.

== Reception ==
John Powell of the SLAM! Sports section of the Canadian Online Explorer rated the event 8 out of 10, stating "Credit the talent. Credit the bookers. Even without a home for their weekly television show, ECW continues to top the other federations when it comes to pure wrestling. Their storylines may not be as intricate but ECW is still best at where it counts in my book: presenting fantastic matches."

Arnold Furious of Wrestling Recaps wrote "A lot of solid effort but too much disappointment in terms of the big matches booked. The main event was way too dull. Still there are 3 matches over the *** rating, which isn’t too bad for a smaller promotion. Especially the Mikey + Tajiri stuff with their match being a total showstealer. The effort was there on the vast majority of the card and bar the main event I enjoyed everything. So I present this show with a thumbs up."

Kevin Pantoja of 411Mania gave the event a score rating of 7 out of 10. According to him, Massacre on 34th Street was a "solid ECW Pay-Per-View." He further wrote "While the two big title matches were rather disappointing, there were some gems on this card. The spotfest tag match ruled and we got a badass grudge match brawl between CW Anderson and Tommy Dreamer. With more good matches than bad, this moves along briskly and was enjoyable but unspectacular."

James Bullock of Capricorn City wrote "Like ECW as a whole in 2000, this was a mixed bag of an event. Outside of the final tag match of the evening, there were no must-see matches coming out of the show that actually lived up to the hype. But the card does feature several very good bouts that make up for the other relatively mundane and forgettable outings. Check out the show for all its good points, but don’t expect something you’ll care for as an overall package."

Brock Allen of Wrestling DVD Network wrote "It may not be a classic PPV but Massacre remains to be an exciting, action packed event." He added "Massacre is an example of what made ECW so great while exposing all the faults that forever held the beloved promotion back."

== Results ==
No.	Results	Stipulations	Times
1^{D}	New Jack defeated Angel	Singles match	—
2^{D}	H. C. Loc defeated Danny Daniels	Singles match	—
3	The Bad Street Boys (Christian York and Joey Matthews) defeated Simon and Swinger	Tag team match to win the managerial services of Dawn Marie	05:38
4	E. Z. Money (with Elektra, Chris Hamrick and Julio Dinero) defeated Balls Mahoney	Singles match	07:52
5	Nova (with Balls Mahoney) defeated Julio Dinero (with Chris Hamrick, E. Z. Money and Elektra)	Singles match	05:57
6	Danny Doring and Roadkill defeated The F.B.I. (Little Guido and Tony Mamaluke) (c) (with Sal E. Graziano)	Tag team match for the ECW World Tag Team Championship	09:01
7	C. W. Anderson defeated Tommy Dreamer	Singles match	16:47
8	Rhino (c) defeated Spike Dudley	Singles match for the ECW World Television Championship	09:51
9	Unholy Alliance (Yoshihiro Tajiri and Mikey Whipwreck) (with The Sinister Minister) defeated Super Crazy and Kid Kash	Tag team match	18:24
10	Steve Corino (c) (with Jack Victory) defeated Jerry Lynn and Justin Credible (with Francine)	Three-Way Dance for the ECW World Heavyweight Championship	22:51
(c) / – the champion(s) heading into the match; D / – this was a dark match
