= Mikey Whipwreck =

American professional wrestler and trainer (born 1973)

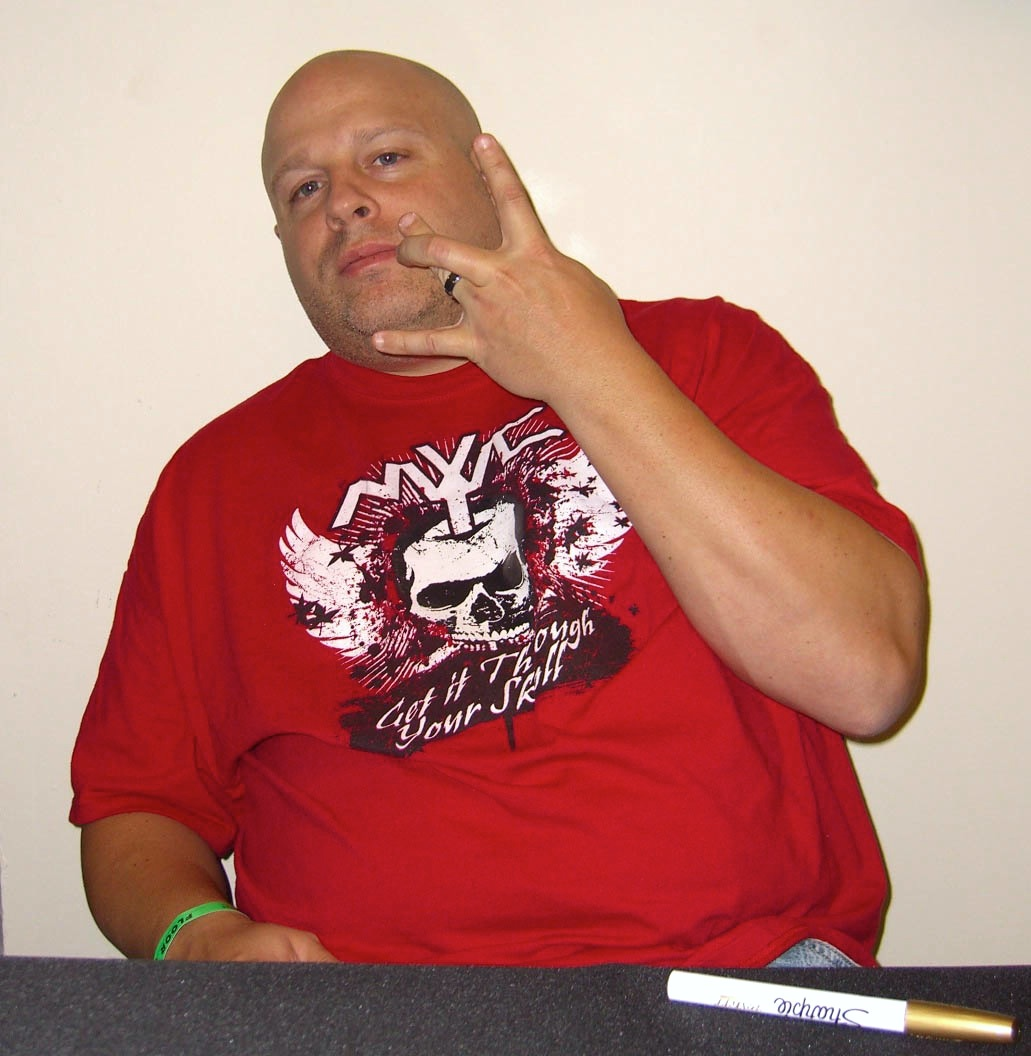
- Whipwreck in 2010

Personal information
- Born: John Michael Watson; June 4, 1973 (age 53) Buffalo, New York, U.S.

Professional wrestling career
- Ring name(s): Mikey Watson; Mikey Wellbody; Mikey Whipwreck; Young Dragon #2
- Billed height: 5 ft 7 in (170 cm)
- Billed weight: 187 lb (85 kg)
- Billed from: Buffalo, New York
- Trained by: Mick Foley; Sonny Blaze
- Debut: 1994

John Michael Watson (born June 4, 1973), better known by his ring name Mikey Whipwreck, is an American semi-retired professional wrestler. He is best known for his time with Extreme Championship Wrestling (ECW), where he was an ECW Triple Crown Champion. Whipwreck is a former world champion, winning the ECW World Heavyweight Championship once. He also became a two-time World Television Champion and a three-time World Tag Team Champion in ECW.

Watson began his professional wrestling career in ECW in 1994 and received the push of an underdog, who quickly captured the Television Championship, his first title in the company. He would later form an on-and-off partnership with Cactus Jack, with whom he held the World Tag Team Championship twice between 1994 and 1996. A year later, Whipwreck captured the World Heavyweight Championship at age 22 and became the youngest ECW World Heavyweight Champion. He would compete as a mid-carder in the company before leaving in 1998 but returned to the company in late 1999 after a short stint with World Championship Wrestling (WCW). Shortly after his return, Whipwreck aligned with The Sinister Minister and formed a tag team with Yoshihiro Tajiri called The Unholy Alliance and won his third World Tag Team Championship with Tajiri. The team existed until ECW's closure in 2001.

== Professional wrestling career ==
=== Eastern Championship Wrestling / Extreme Championship Wrestling (1993–1998) ===
==== Training and debut (1993–1994) ====
Before becoming a professional wrestler, Watson joined Eastern Championship Wrestling (ECW) as a part of their ring crew, who would usually work for free as long as they could have fun in the ring themselves before and after shows had finished. Joey Styles suggested to ECW booker Paul Heyman to check him after watching Watson practice a variety of aerial maneuvers before a live show began. He was hired in ECW after being asked by Heyman to wrestle in the company. Watson was trained by future tag team partner Cactus Jack and made his debut under the ring name "Mikey Whipwreck" on the February 1, 1994 episode of NWA Eastern Championship Wrestling, where he teamed with Keith Shearer in a tag team match against Kevin Sullivan and The Tazmaniac. Whipwreck continued to make appearances as an enhancement talent for the next three months on Eastern Championship Wrestling.

==== Championship reigns (1994–1996) ====
On the May 17 episode of Eastern Championship Wrestling, Whipwreck defeated The Pitbull to win the World Television Championship, his first title in ECW. Whipwreck was heavily pushed upon his debut as a fan favorite underdog character. He made his first televised title defense against Kevin Sullivan on the May 24 episode of Eastern Championship Wrestling, where Whipwreck won by disqualification. He made a successful title defense against 911 by disqualification at When Worlds Collide. Whipwreck soon entered a feud with Jason after Jason interfered in Whipwreck's title defenses against Rockin' Rebel at Hostile City Showdown and Chad Austin at Heat Wave and assaulted him during his matches. Whipwreck dropped the World Television Championship to Jason in a no disqualification match at the Hardcore Heaven event on August 13 when The Pitbulls attacked Whipwreck.

Two weeks later, at the NWA World Title Tournament, Whipwreck substituted for Terry Funk and won the World Tag Team Championship with Cactus Jack by defeating The Public Enemy (Johnny Grunge and Rocco Rock). The duo held the titles until November to Remember, where they lost the titles back to Public Enemy. Whipwreck closed the year with a win over Don E. Allen at Holiday Hell in December. He was named the Rookie of the Year by Wrestling Observer Newsletter in 1994. Whipwreck continued his rivalry with Jason in early 1995 and formed a tag team with Hack Meyers. Whipwreck and Meyers lost to Jason and Paul Lauria in a tag team match at Return of the Funker on February 25. The duo soon began a feud with Raven's Nest after Whipwreck defeated Stevie Richards at Hostile City Showdown. Whipwreck joined forces with Raven's Nest rival Tommy Dreamer to take on Raven and Stevie Richards in a tag team match at Enter the Sandman, which Whipwreck's team lost.

Whipwreck began to ascend the ranks, while also expanding his moveset in the meantime. He received his first major main event push on the August 1 episode of Hardcore TV when he won a battle royal by lastly eliminating Marty Jannetty to become the #1 contender for the World Heavyweight Championship. Later that night, he was unsuccessful in his title shot against The Sandman. Whipwreck began feuding with Sandman over the title. He defeated Sandman in a Singapore cane match at Wrestlepalooza. At Gangstas Paradise, Whipwreck teamed with Public Enemy against Sandman, New Jack and 2 Cold Scorpio in a Gangstas Paradise match, which Whipwreck's team won. On the October 31 episode of Hardcore TV, Whipwreck defeated Sandman in a ladder match to win the World Heavyweight Championship, becoming the youngest world champion in professional wrestling history and a Triple Crown Champion in ECW. Whipwreck successfully defended the title against Steve Austin at November to Remember. At December to Dismember on December 9, Whipwreck defended the title against Sandman and Austin in a three-way dance, where Whipwreck was the first to be eliminated by Austin. Sandman won the title.

Watson continued his championship success at Holiday Hell 1995 on December 29, when he defeated 2 Cold Scorpio in a Winner Takes All match to win Scorpio's World Television Championship and the World Tag Team Championship (which Scorpio held with Sandman), with assistance by former tag team partner Cactus Jack, who delivered a double underhook DDT to Scorpio and put Whipwreck on top of him for the pinfall. Whipwreck was dissatisfied with the title win but Jack chose himself as Whipwreck's other half of the World Tag Team Champions. Whipwreck lost the World Television Championship back to Scorpio at House Party on January 5, 1996, after interference by Raven.

Whipwreck and Cactus were unable to maintain a successful partnership due to Cactus's dirty tactics. The duo dropped the World Tag Team Championship to The Eliminators (Perry Saturn and John Kronus) in February 1996 at Big Apple Blizzard Blast. After the match, Cactus turned on Whipwreck with the aid of Raven and Whipwreck began feuding with Cactus. At CyberSlam, Whipwreck cost Cactus, a match against Shane Douglas, setting a match between the former tag team partners at Big Ass Extreme Bash, which would turn out to be Cactus' farewell match in the company. Whipwreck was defeated following several chair shots and a piledriver.

==== Various feuds (1996–1998) ====
At CyberSlam, Whipwreck began a new angle with Taz by picking up a fight with him after Taz continued to assault his defeated opponent Joel Hartgood after the match, but Whipwreck was taken down with a Tazmission. Whipwreck lost to Taz in a series of matches including one at Big Ass Extreme Bash on March 8. At Heat Wave, Whipwreck attempted to regain the ECW World Tag Team Championship from The Eliminators with Sabu as his partner but failed to win the titles. He captured the European Wrestling Association (EWA) European Junior Heavyweight Championship on August 2 by defeating The Dirt Bike Kid and appeared with the belt on ECW television until losing it to Sabu in London, England in December. Whipwreck appeared on the February 24, 1997 episode of Monday Night Raw, taking place at ECW's home arena Manhattan Center where he lost to Taz as part of an angle between ECW and the World Wrestling Federation (WWF). This would be his only WWE match.

He took a hiatus from ECW for the next few months until returning to television on the May 29 episode of Hardcore TV, where he and Spike Dudley lost to Big Dick Dudley and D-Von Dudley. Whipwreck and Dudley began teaming together and got involved in a feud with PG-13. Whipwreck and Dudley lost to PG-13 at Orgy of Violence but defeated PG-13 and Whipwreck's longtime rival Jason in a handicap match at July's Heat Wave pay-per-view.

Whipwreck was next placed in a rivalry with the undefeated newcomer Justin Credible, who was being managed by Jason. Whipwreck faced Credible in a match at November to Remember, which Whipwreck won by pinning him after a Whipper-Snapper, ending Credible's televised winning streak. Whipwreck disappeared from television and returned at the Living Dangerously pay-per-view on March 1, 1998, where he helped Tommy Dreamer in beating Credible. Whipwreck lost to Credible in a rematch at May's Wrestlepalooza. He competed against Rob Van Dam for the ECW World Television Championship at It Ain't Seinfeld, where the match ended in a no contest after Sabu interfered and attacked Van Dam. Whipwreck would then compete against Sabu in a series of matches throughout the year. His last rivalry in the company was against Jerry Lynn. He defeated Lynn in the opening match of UltraClash on September 19. His last televised match in ECW was a loss to Lynn on the December 17 episode of Hardcore TV.

=== World Championship Wrestling (1999) ===
Watson left ECW for World Championship Wrestling (WCW) in late 1998. He made his surprise WCW debut at the Uncensored pay-per-view in March 1999, unsuccessfully challenging Billy Kidman for the WCW Cruiserweight Championship. He made only three more pay-per-view appearances. He would lose to Scotty Riggs at Spring Stampede and Van Hammer at The Great American Bash. His final WCW pay-per-view match was a Junkyard Invitational at Bash at the Beach. He left WCW after several months, disillusioned by his lack of a push. While in WCW, he generally wrestled in the cruiserweight division or competed against fellow ECW alumni in the hardcore division, which made him have second thoughts about staying in WCW. His last match was a draw against Chase Tatum on the August 23 episode of Monday Nitro.

=== Return to Extreme Championship Wrestling (1999–2001) ===
Watson returned to the ECW in October 1999 at Re-enter the Sandman (televised on the October 31 episode of ECW Hardcore TV). He was brought back to the company by Lou E. Dangerously and faced Mike Awesome for the World Heavyweight Championship but lost. Whipwreck unsuccessfully challenged Rob Van Dam for the ECW World Television Championship on the December 26 Hardcore TV. In 2000, Whipwreck faced C. W. Anderson in a losing effort at Guilty as Charged.

Whipwreck competed as a mid-carder, aligning himself with the Sinister Minister, during which his character was changed from a lovable loser to a pyromaniac. During this time, he began competing against lighter wrestlers in the cruiserweight division. He competed in elimination matches at May's Hardcore Heaven and July's Heat Wave pay-per-views. During this time, he frequently feuded with Little Guido and joined forces with Yoshihiro Tajiri. Whipwreck and Tajiri formed a tag team called the Unholy Alliance.

In August 2000 at Midtown Massacre, the Unholy Alliance won a one-night tag team tournament for the vacant ECW World Tag Team Championship. They defeated Full Blooded Italians (Little Guido and Tony Mamaluke) in the quarter-final round, E. Z. Money and Julio Dinero in the semi-final round and the teams of Jerry Lynn and Tommy Dreamer and Simon Diamond and Johnny Swinger in the final round, a three-way dance to win the vacant titles. Unholy Alliance dropped the belts to the Full Blooded Italians on the September 8 episode of ECW on TNN. The Unholy Alliance unsuccessfully challenged the Full Blooded Italians for the tag titles at Anarchy Rulz. The duo got another opportunity for the titles at November to Remember, where Whipwreck was injured in the match and was replaced by Super Crazy.

This marked the beginning of a brief alliance between Super Crazy and the Unholy Alliance, which ended after the trio lost to Hot Commodity (E. Z. Money, Julio Dinero, and Chris Hamrick) in a six-man tag team match on the November 19 episode of Hardcore TV. Unholy Alliance turned on Crazy when Whipwreck helped Tajiri defeat Crazy in a match by delivering a Whipper-Snapper to Crazy, allowing Tajiri to get the win. The duo became villains in the process. The Unholy Alliance began feuding with Crazy and the duo defeated Crazy and his partner Kid Kash in a tag team match at Massacre on 34th Street. The Unholy Alliance defeated Crazy and Kash and Full Blooded Italians in a three-way dance at ECW's final pay-per-view Guilty as Charged on January 7, 2001. This was Whipwreck's final match in ECW as the company folded down due to bankruptcy shortly after holding its final event on January 13, 2001.

=== Late career (2001–2020) ===
In early 2001, Whipwreck announced his intention to retire in May 2002 if he was not hired by the World Wrestling Federation or BRC in the interim, expressing an interest in pursuing a career in pyrotechnics. By June 11 he had decided to retire by September of that year, as his wrestling style had begun resulting in several nagging injuries, including two herniated discs, damaged knees, a damaged right shoulder, and a jaw cracked to the point of not even being able to eat hard food. In tribute to Whipwreck, Border City Wrestling hosted "The Mikey Whipwreck Retirement Bash" on August 29, 2001, at the Cicciaro Club in Windsor, Ontario and featured several prominent ECW performers, such as Tommy Dreamer and Sabu. Whipwreck wrestled his American retirement match on October 20, 2001, defeating Little Guido.

Whipwreck broke his retirement before long, returning in 2003. He wrestled in several different promotions, such as Ring of Honor, where he would often team with or against some of the wrestlers he has trained. He also made a one-time appearance in Total Nonstop Action Wrestling, where he teamed with The Sandman at one of TNA's weekly pay-per-views against The Gathering (CM Punk and Julio Dinero) in a losing effort. He later appeared at Hardcore Homecoming, an ECW reunion tour organized by fellow ECW alum Shane Douglas, in mid-2005. On the Extreme Reunion portion of the tour, he teamed with Chris Chetti to defeat Simon Diamond and C. W. Anderson on June 10. Two days later at the first-ever ECW One Night Stand, Whipwreck, Yoshihiro Tajiri and The Sinister Minister reunited for one night only as Whipwreck and The Minister stood in Tajiri's corner during his three-way dance against Little Guido and Super Crazy.

During April 2006, Whipwreck worked as an agent for Liberty States Wrestling. At the second ECW One Night Stand pay-per-view on June 11, 2006, Whipwreck was seen on camera celebrating with other ECW wrestlers after Rob Van Dam won the WWE Championship.

On February 21, 2008, in his final New England wrestling appearance, Whipwreck was set to team with The Blue Meanie to challenge for the NECW Tag Team Championship at New England Championship Wrestling's Genesis 8 event in Quincy, Massachusetts, but due to car troubles, Whipwreck was unable to attend the event, causing The Blue Meanie to pick a replacement.

On September 11, 2010, Whipwreck and Scyther defeated Big Time Rush (Tony Burma and Ryan Rush) to win the New York Wrestling Connection Tag Team Championship.

On May 24, 2012, Whipwreck made his debut for his former partner, Tajiri's new Wrestling New Classic (WNC) promotion in Tokyo. He teamed with Tajiri in a tag team hardcore match, where they defeated Jado & Gedo. Two days later, Whipwreck and Tajiri defeated Yo-Hey and Yusuke Kodama in another tag team hardcore match in Osaka. Whipwreck's tour of WNC concluded on May 27, when he, Tajiri and Kana were defeated in a six-person main event by Akira, Dave Finlay and Syuri. Whipwreck returned to WNC on August 30, when he, Kana and Tajiri were defeated in a Barbed Wire Board Deathmatch by Akira, StarBuck and Syuri, with Akira pinning Whipwreck for the win. Whipwreck, Kana, and Tajiri were also defeated in a rematch the following day in Osaka. On September 1, in the third and final Barbed Wire Board Deathmatch between the two teams, Whipwreck pinned StarBuck to win the match for his team.

On March 12, 2015, Watson announced his intention to "let Mikey Whipwreck fade into the past".

On September 14, 2015, it was announced that Mikey Whipwreck would be a playable character in the WWE 2K16 video game.

== Championships and accomplishments ==
- Border City Wrestling
  - BCW Can-Am Heavyweight Championship (1 time)
- Eastern Championship Wrestling / Extreme Championship Wrestling
  - ECW World Heavyweight Championship (1 time)
  - ECW World Television Championship (2 times)
  - ECW World Tag Team Championship (3 times) – with Cactus Jack (2) and Yoshihiro Tajiri (1)
  - Tampa Bay Brawl (1995)
  - ECW World Tag Team Title Tournament (2000) - with Yoshihiro Tajiri
  - First Triple Crown Champion
- European Wrestling Association
  - EWA European Junior Heavyweight Championship (1 time)
- Hardcore Wrestling Alliance
  - HWA Heavyweight Championship (2 times)
  - Quest For The Best Tournament (1999)
  - Hardcore Rumble (2000)
- Impact Championship Wrestling
  - ICW Heavyweight Championship (1 time)
- Jersey All Pro Wrestling
  - JAPW Tag Team Championship (1 time) - with JT Jobber
- Maryland Championship Wrestling
  - MCW Cruiserweight Championship (1 time)
  - Match of the Year (2000)
- New York Wrestling Connection
  - NYWC Heavyweight Championship (3 times)
  - NYWC Tag Team Championship (6 times) - with JT Kasin (1), Wayne (1), Scyther (1), Rex Lawless (1), and Stockade (2)
  - NYWC Hall of Fame (Class of 2016)
- Pro Wrestling Illustrated
  - Ranked No. 146 of the top 500 wrestlers in the "PWI 500" in 1996
  - Ranked No. 459 of the top 500 greatest wrestlers in the "PWI Years" in 2003
- USA Pro Wrestling
  - USA Pro Tag Team Championship (1 time) – with Wayne
- World Xtreme Wrestling
  - WOW Magazine Championship (1 time)
- Wrestling Observer Newsletter
  - Rookie of the Year (1994)
- Xtreme Wrestling Coalition
  - XWC Heavyweight Championship (1 time)
  - XWC Heavyweight Title Tournament (2001)
