= 2 Cold Scorpio =

American professional wrestler (born 1965)

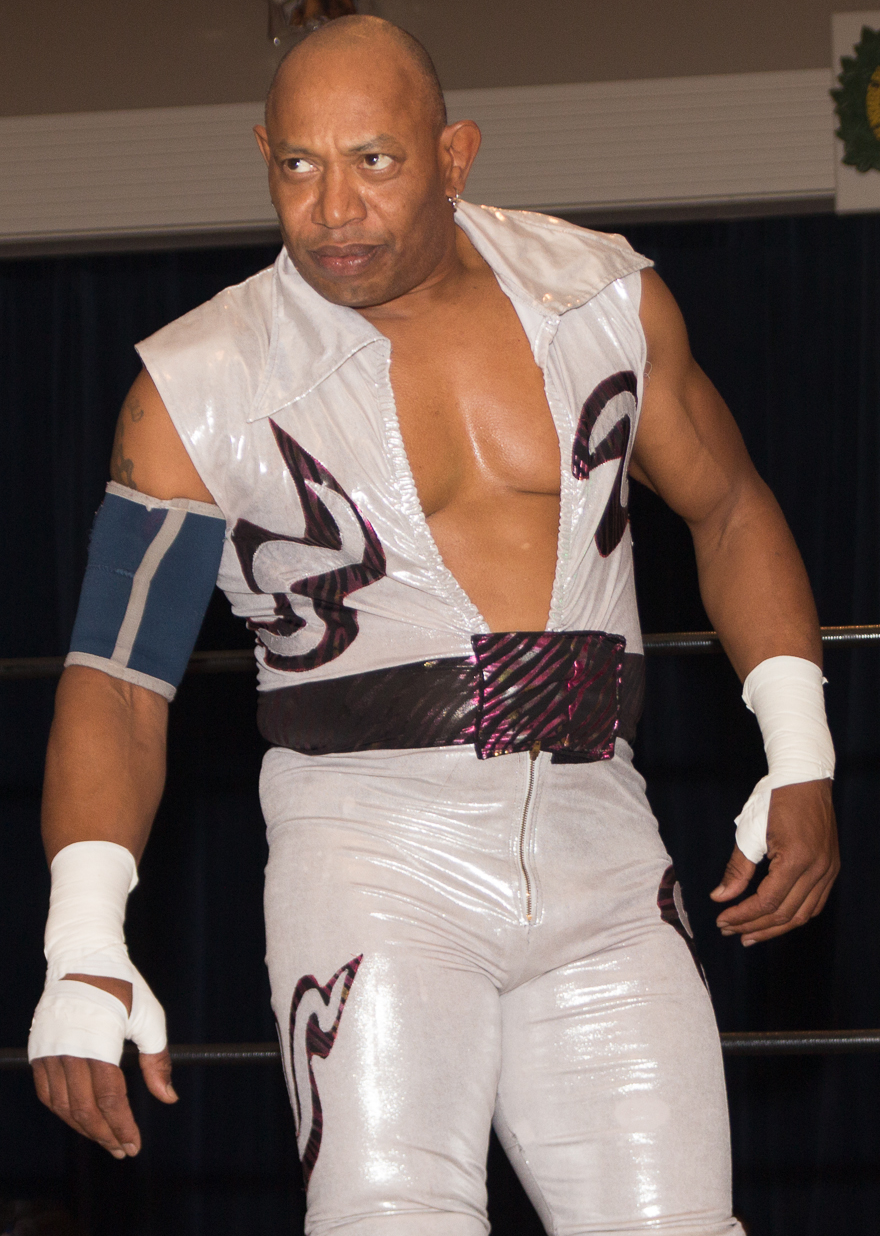
- 2 Cold Scorpio in 2013

Personal information
- Born: Charles Bernard Scaggs; October 25, 1965 (age 60) Denver, Colorado, U.S.

Professional wrestling career
- Ring name(s): 2 Cold Scorpio/Too Cold Scorpio; 2 Gold Scorpio; Black Wazuma; Flash Funk; Flyin' Scorpio; Flying Wazuma; Scorpio
- Billed height: 5 ft 11 in (180 cm)
- Billed weight: 243 lb (110 kg)
- Billed from: Denver, Colorado
- Trained by: NJPW Dojo
- Debut: 1985

Charles Bernard Scaggs (born October 25, 1965) is an American former professional wrestler, better known by his ring name 2 Cold Scorpio. He gained fame for his performances in professional wrestling promotions such as World Championship Wrestling (WCW), Extreme Championship Wrestling (ECW), New Japan Pro-Wrestling (NJPW), Pro Wrestling Noah, and the World Wrestling Federation (WWF, now WWE) (where he also performed as Flash Funk). Over the course of his career, Scorpio held championships including the ECW World Tag Team Championship, ECW World Television Championship, GHC Tag Team Championship, and WCW World Tag Team Championship.

== Professional wrestling career ==
=== Early career (1985–1992) ===
Scaggs made his professional wrestling debut in 1985, adopting the ring name "2 Cold Scorpio". He wrestled in various independent promotions in the United States. On the recommendation of Big Van Vader, he decided to join New Japan Pro-Wrestling, where he trained in the NJPW Dojo. He also wrestled in Europe and Mexico.

=== World Championship Wrestling (1992–1994) ===
In late 1992, Scaggs signed with World Championship Wrestling (WCW), maintaining the 2 Cold Scorpio ring name and making his promotional debut on November 18, 1992, at Clash of the Champions XXI, where he appeared as WCW World Heavyweight Champion Ron Simmons' mystery partner, and the pair would defeat Tony Atlas, The Barbarian, and Cactus Jack in a three-on-two handicap match. On June 16, 1993, at Clash of the Champions XXIII, Scorpio challenged Barry Windham for the NWA World Heavyweight Championship in a losing effort. He then formed a tag team with Marcus Alexander Bagwell, and the pair would go on to defeat The Nasty Boys for the WCW World Tag Team Championship on the October 23, 1993, edition of Saturday Night (taped October 4), before losing them back to the Nasty Boys at Halloween Havoc on October 24. Scaggs was eventually released from WCW in April 1994 for allegedly failing drug tests for marijuana, although he would continue to compete on WCW co-promoted pay-per-view events When Worlds Collide in November 1994 and the WCW/New Japan produced pay-per-view Collision in Korea in April 1995.

=== Extreme Championship Wrestling (1994–1996) ===
Following his WCW departure, Scaggs signed with Extreme Championship Wrestling (ECW) in 1994, where he became a four-time World Television Champion and one-time World Tag Team Champion with The Sandman. He had feuds with wrestlers such as Taz, Shane Douglas, Sabu, and Mikey Whipwreck. In August 1994, Scorpio had another chance at the NWA World Heavyweight Championship, progressing to the finals before losing to Shane Douglas. Following his departure from the WWF, 2 Cold Scorpio returned to ECW for one night at House Party in 1998 as a mystery opponent for Taz. In 1996, he would return to Japan to wrestle for Tokyo Pro Wrestling, under the masked alter ego, Black Wazuma.

=== World Wrestling Federation (1996–1999) ===
Scaggs made his WWF debut on November 17, 1996, at Survivor Series, under the name Flash Funk. His character evoked the stereotypical image of a pimp, wearing tights with large lapels and entering the arena dancing with a pair of "Fly Girls" or "Funkettes" while wearing a large hat and fur coat. Towards the end of his first WWF run, Funk reverted to his 2 Cold Scorpio name, later shortening it to simply "Scorpio", and began teaming up with former WCW teammate and friend Ron Simmons, as well as Terry Funk, through most of 1998. In the summer of 1998, Scorpio competed in the WWF's Brawl for All tournament, a legitimate fighting tournament, where he lost in the quarterfinal round to The Godfather by judges' decision.

In late 1998, Scorpio became a member of Al Snow's J.O.B. Squad, often being a regular on WWF Shotgun Saturday Night. In February 1999, Scaggs requested time off due to personal problems, but was eventually released from the promotion after neglecting to check in with WWF's Vice President of Talent Relations Jim Ross after coming clean about his drug issues. Scorpio's last WWF match would be him and Hardcore Holly losing to Owen Hart and Jeff Jarrett on February 6, 1999, edition of Shotgun Saturday Night, ultimately being the J.O.B. Squad's last televised match.

=== Return to ECW (1999–2000) ===
Following his WWF departure, Scaggs made sporadic appearances for ECW, which included a challenge against then-champion Mike Awesome for the ECW World Heavyweight Championship on December 10, 1999, edition of ECW on TNN. His last ECW match was a loss to Masato Tanaka at CyberSlam (2000).

=== Pro Wrestling Noah (2000–2006) ===
Scaggs competed for All Japan Pro Wrestling until native members of its roster defected to form Pro Wrestling Noah in 2000, and both Scorpio and Vader followed.

Scorpio would team with Vader when he debuted in October 2000. Like Vader, Scorpio earned many singles victories against several of the rosters Japanese wrestlers. At this time Scorpio would receive major pops and fanfare from the Japanese audience, who would often cheer and jive for his charismatic entrances and root for him in matches as a babyface. Because Vader already had a grudge feud with Jun Akiyama, Scorpio would take Vader's side and help him defeat Akiyama and whatever Japanese wrestler Akiyama teamed with at the moment.

Vader and Scorpio would emerge victorious in the grudge feud by defeating Jun Akiyama and Akitoshi Saito on an October 19, 2001, pay-per-view, where they became the inaugural GHC Tag Team Champions. They would lose the titles to Mitsuharu Misawa and Yoshinari Ogawa on November 30.

Scorpio and Vader remained a team throughout 2002, and despite not winning the titles again, they continued having many victories in the tag team and singles division. Vader's last appearance in NOAH was in January 2003, and Doug Williams would become Scorpio's replacement that spring.

Scorpio and Doug Williams won the GHC Tag Team Championship in January 2005. On November 5, 2005, Scorpio won the GHC Openweight Hardcore Championship against Yoshinobu Kanemaru in a pay-per-view match.

=== Return to WWE (2006–2007) ===
In 2006, 2 Cold Scorpio signed a contract with World Wrestling Entertainment. Upon joining the promotion, he returned to using his Flash Funk character in the WWE developmental promotion Deep South Wrestling until he was released on May 11, 2007, without ever appearing on WWE television. On the 15th anniversary of WWE Raw on December 10, 2007, 2 Cold Scorpio participated in a battle royal as "Flash Funk", eliminating Steve Blackman while eliminating himself in the process.

=== Independent circuit (2005–2025) ===
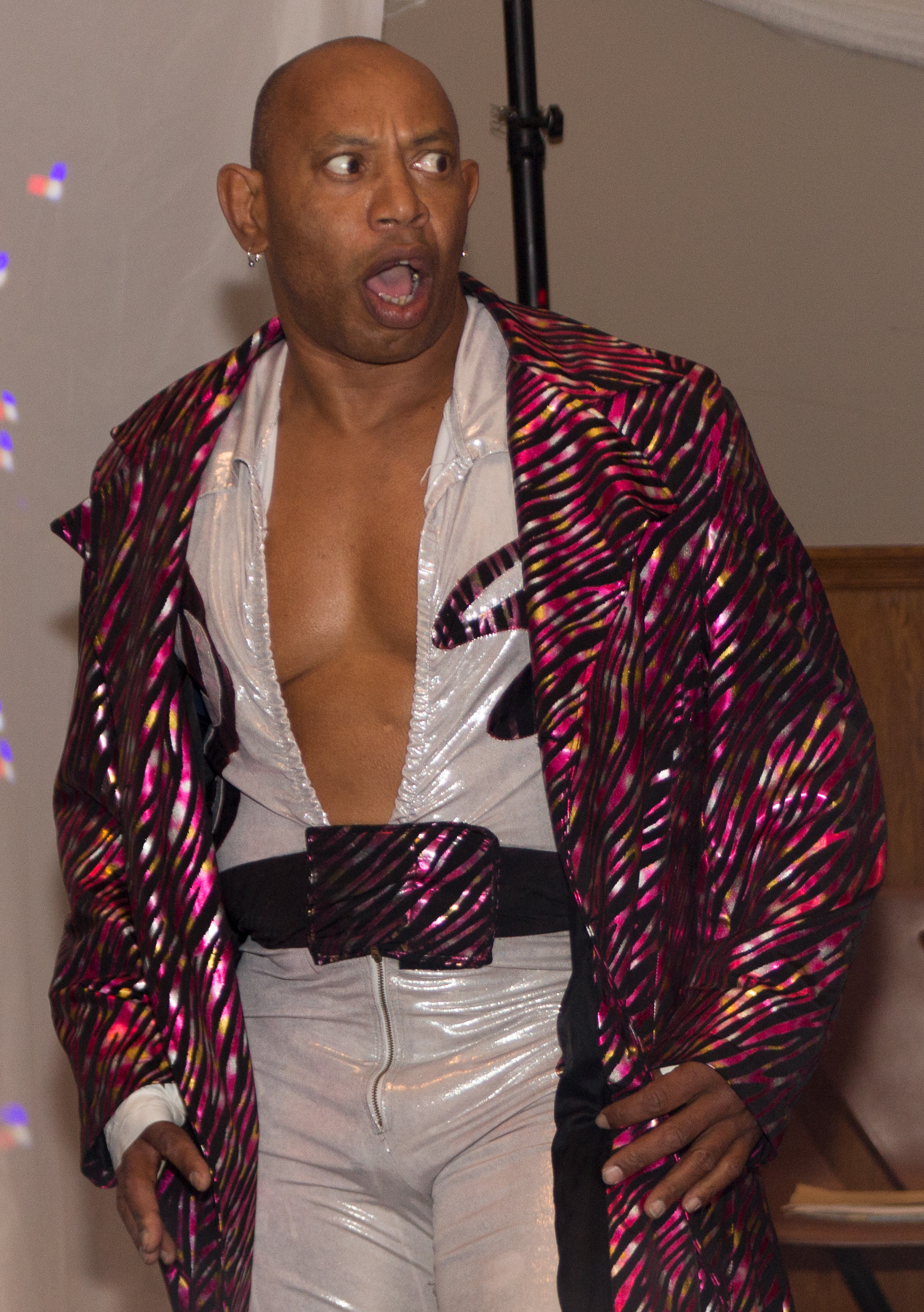
2 Cold Scorpio making his entrance at a show in March 2013

On June 10, 2005, 2 Cold Scorpio wrestled at the ECW reunion event Hardcore Homecoming, defeating Kid Kash. In late 2007, 2 Cold Scorpio joined Booker T's Pro Wrestling Alliance promotion, based in Houston, Texas. He wrestled occasionally in Pasadena, Texas, at the city's convention center, and he participated in a feud with heel wrestler and student Gustavo Mendoza. His last PWA match was on February 16, 2008, at Texas Tapout against Chris Adams. On August 8, 2010, 2 Cold Scorpio wrestled at Total Nonstop Action Wrestling's ECW reunion show, Hardcore Justice, defeating C. W. Anderson. On April 28, 2012, 2 Cold Scorpio wrestled Shane Douglas in the main event of Extreme Reunion (a wrestling event promoted by Douglas) in Philadelphia, Pennsylvania. During the match, two masked men got involved. One was Kevin Sullivan, who attacked Douglas. The other was former ECW owner Tod Gordon, who pinned 2 Cold Scorpio with a twisting sunset flip. 2 Cold Scorpio made his debut for Chikara in September 2012, when he, Jerry Lynn and Tommy Dreamer entered the 2012 King of Trios as "The Extreme Trio", defeating Team WWF (1–2–3 Kid, Aldo Montoya and Tatanka) in their first round match. The following day, The Extreme Trio was eliminated from the tournament by Team ROH (Mike Bennett, Matt Jackson and Nick Jackson).

On February 2, 2013, 2 Cold Scorpio defeated A. C. H. in the main event of the first ever National Pro Wrestling Day to become the 2013 Rey De Voladores. On June 23, 2013, 2 Cold Scorpio was defeated by John Hennigan in a match for the FWE Heavyweight Championship at House of Hardcore 2. On September 2, 2017, 2 Cold Scorpio unsuccessfully challenged Hannibal for the Great North Wrestling Canadian Championship at the Hawkesbury Bike Fest 2017 in Hawkesbury, Ontario. On February 18, 2018, 2 Cold Scorpio won the WPW Heavyweight title at Cheltenham Town Hall by defeating Kendo Kashin. On August 3, 2018, 2 Cold Scorpio competed in the 2018 Scenic City Invitational Tournament held in Soddy Daisy, Tennessee, losing in the first round to AJ Gray. The following night Scorpio defeated Darius Lockhart in non-tournament action. As of July 2019, 2 Cold Scorpio has taken the role of head trainer at the Rocky Mountain Pro Wrestling Academy in Golden, Colorado. Within the Rocky Mountain Pro promotion, he also has a large role in producing the live television product they air on Right Now TV, Fight Network UK and Twitch.tv. 2 Cold Scorpio is also the current Rocky Mountain Pro tag team champion alongside tag team partner Airborne Alex Anthony after winning the championship at their Milestone 9 Pay Per View on June 30, 2019. On September 10, 2020, 2 Cold Scorpio made his debut for Game Changer Wrestling as part of their for the Culture event. He was defeated by AR Fox. On October 22, 2021, he debuted with PCW Ultra in a losing effort as he was defeated by The Blood Hunter with Kevin Sullivan.

== Personal life ==
In a 2004 Ring of Honor Straight Shootin' interview, Scaggs admitted to using crack cocaine during his time with ECW and the WWF. He noted that his usage significantly increased while in the WWF, as his higher earnings provided greater access to the drug. Scaggs expressed regret for his actions, explaining that he did not overcome his addiction to crack until after being released from the WWF in early 1999 due to drug-related issues. He remains a regular user and advocate of marijuana.

=== Assault conviction ===
On June 15, 2024, Scaggs was arrested in Jackson County, Missouri, for stabbing a man at a Love's Travel Stop in Kansas City. Scaggs, who was employed as a security guard for the store at the time, claimed that he approached a customer who had lit a cigarette inside and requested that he put the cigarette out, and that the man then became agitated, issued threats, and tried to tackle him to the ground, leading to a struggle between the two. Scaggs claims that during the struggle, he drew a knife from his pocket and used it in self-defense. The victim sustained stab wounds to the head, chest, abdomen, legs, and buttocks. Scaggs was released on bail and entered a not-guilty plea. After a series of delays, Scaggs' trial was set to take place on August 3, 2026. On August 3, Scaggs pleaded guilty to the felony charges of second degree assault and armed criminal action. His sentencing was set for October 9, 2026. On September 17, Scaggs' bond was revoked and he was remanded back into custody after he violated his bond conditions by brandishing a firearm. On October 9, Scaggs was sentenced to 6 years in prison.

== Championships and accomplishments ==
- All Star Wrestling Alliance
  - ASWA Heavyweight Championship (1 time)
- Big Time Wrestling
  - BTW Heavyweight Championship (1 time)
- Canadian Wrestling's Elite
  - CWE Canadian Unified Junior Heavyweight Championship (1 time)
- Chikara
  - Rey de Voladores (2013)
- Extreme Championship Wrestling
  - ECW World Television Championship (4 times)
  - ECW World Tag Team Championship (1 time) – with The Sandman
- German Wrestling Federation
  - GWF Heavyweight Championship (1 time)
  - GWF Heavyweight Title Tournament (1999)
- Hardcore Hall of Fame
  - Class of 2014
- Pacific Championship Wrestling
  - PCW Heavyweight Championship (1 time)
- Peach State Wrestling
  - PSW Cordele City Heavyweight Championship (1 time, final)
- Pennsylvania Championship Wrestling
  - PCW Heavyweight Championship (1 time)
- Pro Wrestling Illustrated
  - Ranked No. 201 of the 500 best singles wrestlers of the "PWI Years" in 2003
  - Ranked No. 33 of the top 500 singles wrestlers in the PWI 500 in 1995
- Pro Wrestling Noah
  - GHC Openweight Hardcore Championship (1 time)
  - GHC Tag Team Championship (2 times) – with Vader (1) and Doug Williams (1)
  - GHC Tag Team Title Tournament (2001) – with Vader
- Pro Wrestling Unplugged
  - PWU World Heavyweight Championship (3 times)
- Rocky Mountain Pro
  - RMP Tag Team Championship (1 time) – with "Airborne" Alex Anthony
- Super Powers Of Wrestling
  - SPO Heavyweight Championship (1 time)
- World Championship Wrestling
  - WCW World Tag Team Championship (1 time) – with Marcus Alexander Bagwell
- Wrestling Observer Newsletter
  - Best Wrestling Maneuver (1992) 450° splash
  - Most Underrated Wrestler (1997)
- World Pro Wrestling
  - WPW Championship (1 time)
