= The Network (professional wrestling) =

Professional wrestling stable

Tag team
- Members: See below
- Debut: 1999
- Disbanded: 2001

The Network was a professional wrestling stable that was formed in 1999 when ECW began to broadcast nationally on TNN.

== History ==
The Network was a professional wrestling stable that was formed in 1999 when ECW began to broadcast nationally on TNN.

TNN did not give ECW much money to produce their program, yet expected ECW to have high-quality production values like WCW Monday Nitro and Monday Night Raw. Also, TNN poorly advertised and promoted ECW, producing barely any press releases or TV ads, even though ECW was TNN's highest rated weekly program at that point. The only real time that TNN actually advertised ECW was during the ECW program itself, as well during NASCAR on TNN coverage. Heyman decided to recruit Don Callis, who played the part of Cyrus, to serve as a stand-in for the real problems between ECW and TNN at that point. Callis played a representative for TNN/The Network, who constantly criticized the violent nature of ECW programming, and commentator Joel Gertner in particular for his sexually loaded commentary and ring introductions. Callis would threaten to replace ECW's programming with episodes of RollerJam.

Cyrus was joined in his quest against ECW by Steve Corino, the self-proclaimed "King of Old School", who got heat railing against hardcore wrestling. Corino brought with him the wrestlers he managed who then became "The Network"; Rhino, Yoshihiro Tajiri, and Corino's own manager and old school wrestler Jack Victory. When Corino turned on Justin Credible, the group slowly imploded until only Cyrus, Rhino and Jerry Lynn remained allies, up until the point where Cyrus managed Rhino to the ECW World Heavyweight Championship and Jerry Lynn against the returning Rob Van Dam at the final pay-per-view.

== Members ==
- Members
  - Cyrus
  - Rhino
  - Yoshihiro Tajiri
  - Scotty Anton
  - Steve Corino
  - Jack Victory
  - Lou E. Dangerously
- Allies
  - Justin Credible
  - Lance Storm
  - Jason Knight
  - Dawn Marie
  - Francine

== Championships ==
- Extreme Championship Wrestling

- ECW World Heavyweight Championship (2 times) – Rhino (1), and Steve Corino (1)
- ECW World Television Championship (3 times) – Rhino (2), and Yoshihiro Tajiri (1)

== See also ==
- Impact Players
- Unholy Alliance
- Right to Censor
