= Unholy Alliance (professional wrestling) =

Professional wrestling tag team

Tag team
- Members: Mikey Whipwreck; Yoshihiro Tajiri
- Billed heights: Whipwreck: 5 ft 7 in (1.70 m); Tajiri: 5 ft 9 in (1.75 m)
- Combined billed weight: 394 lb (179 kg)
- Debut: 2000
- Disbanded: 2001

The Unholy Alliance was the tag team of Mikey Whipwreck and Yoshihiro Tajiri in Extreme Championship Wrestling (ECW). They were managed by The Sinister Minister.

== History ==
=== Extreme Championship Wrestling ===
Whipwreck and Tajiri became tag team partners soon after Tajiri was kicked out of The Network. On August 24, 2000, at Midtown Massacre, Whipwreck and Tajiri won a one-night tournament to be crowned new ECW World Tag Team Champions (Justin Credible "dropped" the belts so he could face Tommy Dreamer for the ECW Title) when they defeated Tommy Dreamer and Jerry Lynn and Simon Diamond and Johnny Swinger in a 3-way match in the finals. They lost the title to The Full Blooded Italians (Little Guido and Tony Mamaluke) the following night.

At both Anarchy Rulz and November to Remember 2000, the Unholy Alliance failed to recapture the title from the FBI. On January 7, 2001, Tajiri and Whipwreck beat Kid Kash and Super Crazy and FBI in a 3-way dance at Guilty as Charged 2001 to become the number one contenders to Danny Doring and Roadkill's ECW Tag Team Championship. The match never happened as ECW went bankrupt soon after.

=== Reunions ===
The Unholy Alliance reunited at ECW One Night Stand on June 12, 2005, when Whipwreck and the Sinister Minister managed Tajiri during his match with Super Crazy and Little Guido.

On January 28, 2012, the Unholy Alliance once more reunited, though without the Sinister Minister, to team against the tag team 7OH!4 of Caleb Konley and Cedric Alexander on the Pro Wrestling Superstars show that was part of the sixth WrestleReunion event. The duo won when Tajiri sprayed poison mist in Konley's face, allowing for Whipwreck to hit the Whippersnapper.

On May 24, 2012, Tajiri and Whipwreck reunited in Tajiri's Japanese Wrestling New Classic (WNC) promotion, defeating Gedo and Jado in a hardcore tag team match in Tokyo's Korakuen Hall. Two days later, Tajiri and Whipwreck defeated Yo-Hey and Yusuke Kodama in another hardcore tag team match in Osaka. On April 18, 2014, Tajiri and Whipwreck reunited in Squared Circle Wrestling (2CW) in Watertown, New York, defeating A. R. Fox and Rich Swann.

== Championships and accomplishments ==
- Extreme Championship Wrestling

- ECW World Tag Team Championship (1 time)
- ECW World Tag Team Championship Tournament (2000)

== See also ==
- The Network (professional wrestling)
