= Father James Mitchell =

American professional wrestling manager (born 1966)

James Mitchell
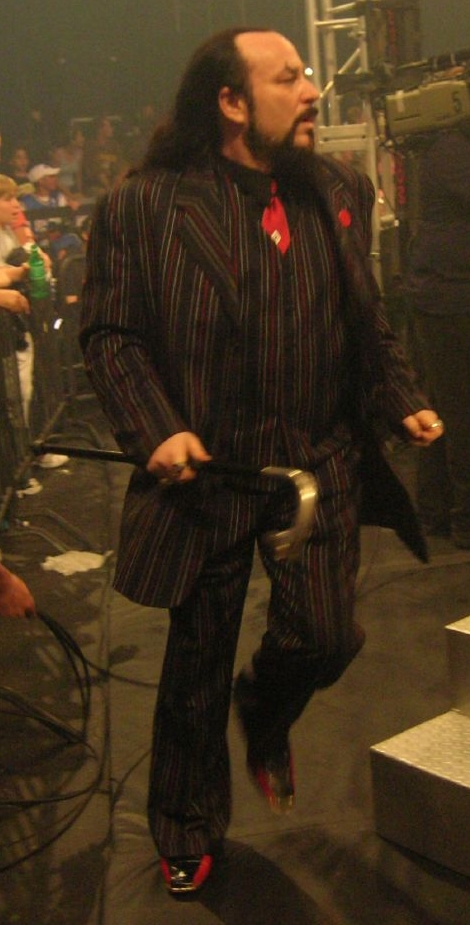
- Mitchell in 2006

Personal information
- Born: James Lamar Mitchell; February 26, 1965 (age 61) Orlando, Florida, U.S.

Professional wrestling career
- Ring name(s): Daryl Van Horne; James Mitchell; James Vandenberg; Father James Mitchell; Jim Mitchell; The Sinister Minister
- Billed height: 5 ft 9 in (1.75 m)
- Billed weight: 195 lb (88 kg)
- Trained by: Gene Anderson
- Debut: 1989

James Lamar Mitchell (born February 26, 1965) is an American professional wrestling manager, known for his appearances with World Championship Wrestling (WCW) as James Vandenberg, Extreme Championship Wrestling (ECW) as The Sinister Minister, and Total Nonstop Action Wrestling (TNA) under his own name.

== Early life ==
Mitchell dropped out of high school and eventually earned his GED at the insistence of his stepmother.

== Professional wrestling career ==
=== Early career and Smoky Mountain Wrestling (1989–1995) ===
Mitchell wrestled in the Carolinas and in Virginia before joining Smoky Mountain Wrestling (SMW). Mitchell, known as Daryl Van Horne, made his SMW debut by managing Prince Kharis, a 4,000-year-old mummy. Mitchell said he took the "Daryl Van Horne" name from Jack Nicholson's character name in the film The Witches of Eastwick. The gimmick was a flop in the promotion and dropped after only a few months. Van Horne went on to manage Kendo the Samurai (a masked samurai gimmick played at different points by Tim Horner, Scott Antol and Brian Logan, among others) for a brief time before disappearing from the promotion.

Mitchell was fired by Jim Cornette after hearing that Smokey Mountain Wrestling was going out of business due to a family problem with Cornette; Mitchell said he dialed all the production crew when he was drunk dialing and eventually was yelled at on the phone by Cornette.

=== World Championship Wrestling (1997–1999) ===
Mitchell debuted in World Championship Wrestling (WCW) as James Vandenberg, the manager of Mortis, a masked wrestler billed as a shoot fighter from Taipei who was one of Vandenberg's "rare oddities". Mortis feuded with Glacier in an angle titled "Blood Runs Cold," because of the popularity of the Mortal Kombat video games and faced him at Uncensored on March 16, 1997, in his pay-per-view debut, which he lost. Following the match, Wrath debuted, siding with Mortis and Vandenberg and attacking Glacier. Glacier defeated Mortis in a rematch at Slamboree on May 18, when Wrath interfered on Mortis's behalf, causing a disqualification; Glacier then suffered another post-match beating before Ernest "The Cat" Miller ran to the ring to defend him. The four men fought one another over the following weeks, culminating in a match at Bash at the Beach on July 13, which was won by Mortis and Wrath. After Blood Runs Cold unofficially ended, Vandenberg continued to manage the pair through the remainder of 1997 as Mortis and Wrath entered a feud with The Faces of Fear that culminated in a pinfall victory at Fall Brawl. In early 1998, the group was split up after Wrath was sidelined with an injury and Mortis was moved into a new angle involving Raven and the Flock.

Mitchell then tried to get a commentary segment off the ground on WCW Saturday Night, titled "Vandenberg's Odditorium." He appeared on camera standing alone in a dimly-lit space, discussing current feuds such as that between Saturn and Glacier, always finishing the segment with "And I could be wrong...but I doubt it." The segment was quietly axed after a few weeks. Mitchell was then sent home and was paid for two years until his contract ran out.

=== Extreme Championship Wrestling (2000–2001) ===
In 2000, Mitchell debuted in Extreme Championship Wrestling (ECW) as an unnamed evil priest character. He was originally planned to manage Mike Awesome but instead began an angle with Raven. The angle was dropped when Raven went to the WWF, and Mitchell was subsequently rebranded as The Sinister Minister, a heel narrator for ECW on TNN, much like The Crypt Keeper in Tales from the Crypt. Upon debuting as a manager, he was surprisingly accepted as a fan favorite by the crowd. He managed The Unholy Alliance (Yoshihiro Tajiri and Mikey Whipwreck) during their feud with Full Blooded Italians. On November 5, 2000, he was injured in an accident with a handheld machine that was used for shooting fireballs, which exploded and blew off a piece of his finger.

=== Total Nonstop Action Wrestling (2002–2004, 2005–2008) ===
==== The New Church and The Gathering (2002–2004) ====
Mitchell debuted in Total Nonstop Action Wrestling (TNA) on June 19, 2002. On October 30, going by the name Father James Mitchell, he returned to TNA along with Slash and Brian Lee, collectively known as the Disciples of The New Church. The New Church feuded with America's Most Wanted throughout 2002.

In 2003, The New Church began feuding with Raven. On November 5, 2003, Mitchell fought Raven in a last man standing match that was won by Raven. In late 2003, Mitchell aligned himself with The Gathering, Raven's former protégés.

==== Alliance with Abyss and departure (2005–2008, 2013) ====
Mitchell returned to TNA on July 1, 2005, aligning with Abyss. Mitchell led Abyss to victories over Lance Hoyt at Sacrifice and Sabu at Genesis. At Turning Point on December 11, Abyss lost to Sabu in a barbed wire match.

At Genesis in 2006, Abyss won his first NWA World Heavyweight Championship by defeating Sting. The weeks after Abyss's title reign, Sting seemed to control Abyss, and he ordered Abyss to come to the ring alone where he would speak to Abyss without Mitchell speaking in Abyss's ear. Mitchell nearly lost control of Abyss, however soon scared him straight by showing Abyss a prison. Mitchell slammed Abyss into the fence and slapped him and reminded Abyss about his past. This act let Mitchell once again control Abyss with both men going into Final Resolution as a unit, manager and wrestler, to help Abyss defend his title against Sting and Christian Cage. On January 14, 2007, at Final Resolution Abyss lost his World Heavyweight Championship to Christian Cage during a Three Way Elimination match against Sting and Christian Cage. Abyss was eliminated by Sting after a Scorpion Death Drop, and then Sting by Christian Cage. The following week, Mitchell was later attacked and kidnapped by Sting, who threw him into the trunk of his car, and told Mitchell to leave Abyss alone. On January 25, he was able to give Sting by payback by launching a fireball right into Sting's face. The week after that, he told Abyss to find Sting while he later came into the ring and told Sting if he would accept his challenge at Against All Odds pay-per-view and on February 8, he accepted. He was then "kidnapped" by Sting again only this time, he was locked up in a cage, until Abyss came to his rescue by attacking Sting while Mitchell grab his belt buckle and choked Sting with it. At Against All Odds on February 11, Abyss lost to Sting in a prison yard match after he was powerbombed by Sting into a barbed wired table.

Subsequently, Mitchell was attacked by Sting after the match, causing him to bleed heavily. Mitchell returned to on-screen action on March 22 when he came up the ramp and distracted Abyss away from his tag team match by bringing Abyss' on-screen mother to ringside. It was then revealed at a meeting with Sting and Mitchell that Abyss' mother had actually shot his dad, and Abyss took the blame to protect his mother. Mitchell was once again Abyss' handler, as "Father Jim" had threatened to report Abyss' mother to the authorities if Abyss did not come back to him, after which Mitchell allied Abyss with Team Cage.

On the April 19 edition of Impact!, after months of abuse by Mitchell, Abyss turned on Mitchell, Black Hole Slamming him, and turning face. Later, Mitchell delivered a eulogy for Abyss, saying that he had moved on to bigger and better things, and implying that he had a new monster. This monster was eventually revealed as his "son" Judas Mesias, who first appeared as a hand cutting a hole in the ring and pulling Abyss through it. He made his official debut on the September 13 Impact!, assaulting Abyss. On the January 17 edition of Impact!, Mitchell finally revealed the secret that he had been threatening to reveal for months: that Abyss was his on-screen son. After a six-month inactivity, TNA announced that Mitchell was released from his TNA contract on July 7, 2008.

On July 5, 2013, Mitchell made a one night appearance at TNA One Night Only Hardcore Justice, accompanying Judas Mesias, who faced his storyline half brother and full brother of Abyss, Joseph Park in a monsters ball match, which Park won.

=== World Wrestling Entertainment (2005, 2009) ===
Mitchell appeared at the World Wrestling Entertainment-produced ECW reunion pay-per-view ECW One Night Stand on June 12, 2005. He and Whipwreck accompanied Tajiri to ringside for his match with Super Crazy and Little Guido.

He was due to continue managing wrestlers and working with the WWE's version of Extreme Championship Wrestling after its re-launch, however, a contract between Mitchell and WWE was never signed, and he ceased making any further appearances on ECW.

In June 2009, Mitchell was going to try out for WWE's developmental territory Florida Championship Wrestling but was told that he needed to pay $1,000 to try out and that manager tryouts had already occurred in January 2009.

=== Return to Impact Wrestling (2017–2019) ===
Mitchell made his return to TNA, now Impact Wrestling, at Slammiversary XV where he was seen giving Joseph Park his Abyss mask. Upon donning the mask, Park transformed into Abyss, allowing him and Jeremy Borash to defeat Josh Mathews and Scott Steiner. After this, Mitchell would make sporadic appearances, aiding his storyline son, including summoning Abyss in March 2018 for a Monster's Ball match against Kongo Kong. Mitchell would then make recurring appearances during Rosemary's storyline feud with Su Yung over the soul of Allie, first appearing as the keeper of Rosemary's soul, which would then be followed by further appearances in February 2019, managing Su Yung, Allie and an undead bride against a team led by Rosemary. During the September 2019 tapings, Mitchell was briefly seen taking the onscreen wedding of Brian Cage & Melissa Santos, held in a radically shortened format which included only the vows and exchanging of rings.

=== All Elite Wrestling (2021) ===
On February 3, 2021, Mitchell appeared on All Elite Wrestling's Beach Break to officiate the wedding of Penelope Ford and Kip Sabian.

=== National Wrestling Alliance (2021–present) ===
On August 30, 2021, Mitchell appeared on National Wrestling Alliance's 73rd Anniversary Show as the manager of Judias. He has since appeared on NWA Power along with Judias.

A segment at Samhain in October 2023 that saw Mitchell doing cocaine drew controversy and reportedly caused tension between NWA and the CW Network.

In 2024, Mitchell has continued as a manager in NWA, managing Judias, Max the Impaler, Gaagz the Gymp, and Sal Vation as the Miserably Faithful.

== Professional wrestling persona ==
Mitchell admired comic book villains when he grew up; For inspiration of his character, Mitchell attributes the curled-up eyebrows to The Punisher on The Amazing Spider-Man (issue 129); the curled-up beard was a combination of a stereotypical devil and the Green Arrow, and the laughter was taken from the Green Goblin and Cesar Romero's version of the Joker. Mitchell said the red suit he wore was inspired from the red suit Richard Pryor wore on his stand-up comedy performance in Richard Pryor: Live on the Sunset Strip

== Other Media ==
Mitchell appears on Dark Side of the Ring episode for Chris Kanyon in 2021 and for The Renegade in August 2026.

== Personal life ==
While working for TNA, Mitchell also sang at approximately ten shows a week at resorts in Florida. His act consisted of songs by Frank Sinatra and Tony Bennett, in addition to songs akin to The Blues Brothers and The Memphis Horns. He also hosted open karaoke events at the resorts, on a weekly basis.

Mitchell appears on the Insane Clown Posse song "Ride the Tempest", from their album The Tempest. He performs a carnival barker-style introduction to the song, featuring the signature laughter of his Sinister Minister gimmick.

== Accomplishments ==
- WrestleCrap
  - Gooker Award (2023) - doing drugs on PPV (tied with CM Punk on AEW)
