= Simon and Swinger =

Professional wrestling tag team

Tag team
- Members: Simon Diamond; Swinger; Glenn Gilberti
- Name: Maximum Force (XWF)
- Billed heights: Simon Diamond: 6 ft 2 in (1.88 m); Swinger: 5 ft 10 in (1.78 m); Gilberti: 6 ft 0 in (1.83 m)
- Combined billed weight: 490 lb (220 kg; 35 st)
- Debut: 2000
- Disbanded: 2010

Simon Diamond and Swinger were a professional wrestling tag team in Extreme Championship Wrestling and Total Nonstop Action Wrestling. During their time in ECW, they were managed by Dawn Marie. The duo have won both the NWA World Tag Team Championship and the Maximum Pro Wrestling Tag Team Championship.

== History ==
The team made their debut in Extreme Championship Wrestling (ECW) in 2000. On December 3, 2000 at the Massacre on 34th Street pay-per-view, Dawn Marie announced that she would become the manager of the winner of the opening match pitting Simon Diamond and Swinger against Christian York and Joey Matthews. Although York and Matthews won the bout, Psaltis opted to join forces with Simon and Swinger. The trio stayed together until ECW declared bankruptcy in April 2001.

Following ECW, they moved on to the independent circuit. They appeared, alongside Dawn Marie, under the team name of "Maximum Force", in the short lived X Wrestling Federation in November 2001. They also became Maximum Pro Wrestling Tag Team Champions in September 2003 by defeating The Black Hearts. The team briefly reappeared in Total Nonstop Action Wrestling in 2003 as part of the New York Connection. They won the NWA World Tag Team Championship by defeating America's Most Wanted. In September 2003, Swinger was replaced temporarily by David Young, due to Swinger's emergency appendectomy. The team was managed by fellow NYC-member Glenn Gilbertti. In early 2004, Diamond and Swinger began feuding with each other, ultimately leading to the breakup of the team. On August 8, 2010, the team of Swinger and Diamond returned to the ring at Hardcore Justice PPV (ECW reunion show). At the event Swinger, Simon Diamond and Kid Kash were defeated by Little Guido, Tony Luke and Tracy Smothers of The Full Blooded Italians in a six man tag team match.

== Championships and accomplishments ==
- Maximum Pro Wrestling

- MPW Tag Team Championship (1 time)

- Total Nonstop Action Wrestling

- NWA World Tag Team Championship (1 time)

== See also ==
- The Diamonds in the Rough
