= Kid Kash =

American professional wrestler (born 1969)

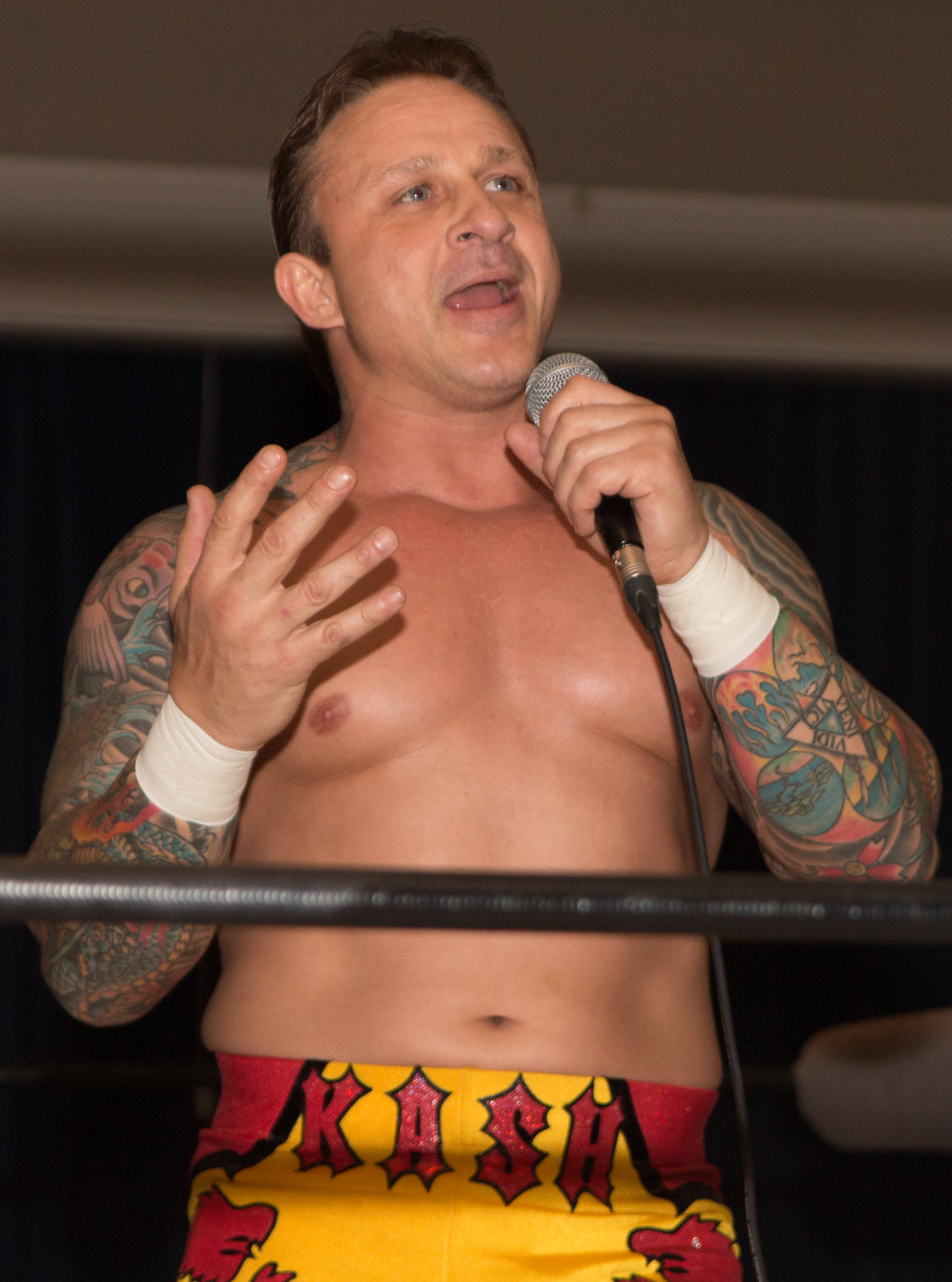
- Kash in 2013

Personal information
- Born: David Tyler Cash; July 31, 1969 (age 57) Waynesboro, Virginia, U.S.

Professional wrestling career
- Ring name(s): Cash; The Crow; Davey Morton; David Cash; David Jericho; Davey Piezono; David Tyler Morton Jericho; Kid Kash
- Billed height: 5 ft 9 in (175 cm)
- Billed weight: 202 lb (92 kg)
- Billed from: Johnson City, Tennessee
- Trained by: Ricky Morton; Tim Horner
- Debut: October 1989

David Tyler Cash (born July 31, 1969), better known by his ring name Kid Kash, is an American professional wrestler and former mixed martial artist best known for his tenures with Extreme Championship Wrestling (ECW), Total Nonstop Action Wrestling (TNA) and World Wrestling Entertainment (WWE).

== Professional wrestling career ==
=== Early career (1989–1996) ===
Kash's father was a boxer and Kash began training by the age of seven years. He went on to become a professional fighter and worked in Japan. Cash met up with Ricky Morton during his travels, and took Cash on the road with him and continued his training. Working as a welder by day, Cash wrestled on the independent circuit. Under the name David Tyler Morton he formed a short lived tag team with Ricky Morton.

Kash started wrestling at age 20 in 1989.

=== Extreme Championship Wrestling (1996–1997) ===
Cash's first mainstream exposure came in late November 1996 with ECW. Cash, then wrestling as David Tyler Morton, went to Philadelphia with friend and sometimes tag team partner "Heavy Metal" Ric Savage. Cash was friends with New Jack of the Gangstas and Rob Van Dam, and it was Rob Van Dam who first introduced Cash to Paul Heyman.

=== Independent circuit (1997–1999) ===
In 1997, Cash left ECW to return to the indies. Mainly worked for National Championship Wrestling and New Dimension Wrestling.

=== World Wrestling Federation (1998) ===
Cash even wrestled house shows for WWF. He also appeared once at TV tapings, using ring name David Jericho, on April 28, 1998, at WWF Shotgun Saturday Night where he was defeated by Taka Michinoku. During a WWF house show against the tag team Too Cool, Cash broke both of his ankles after performing a botched hurricanrana on Scotty 2 Hotty. The injury sidelined Cash for a while.

=== Extreme Championship Wrestling (1999–2001) ===
Cash resurfaced in ECW in late 1999 under a new gimmick, "Kid Kash". The name change was due to his resemblance to musician Kid Rock. Under this name, Kash would dress like Kid Rock from his Devil Without a Cause album, and even used the song (and named one of his finishers, The Bawitaba) during this phase in his career. Just months after his return, Kash suffered a broken jaw in Atlanta at the hands of The Dupps. He had legitimate heat with the tag team for their supposed stiff and shoot moves on Kash during matches and as payback, during a planned run in during Kash's match, Bo Dupp did an unplanned frog splash right on Kash's face, breaking both sides of his jaw. At the time, Atlanta was going through a flu epidemic, and so Kash had to get a private physician to fix his jaw because the hospitals were swamped. Despite the injury, Kash continued to wrestle on TV. He even wrestled on the Guilty as Charged PPV the very next night after driving from Atlanta to Birmingham, AL, less than 24 hours after his jaw was wired shut. This earned him the respect of Paul Heyman and several other ECW wrestlers. Kash recovered from the injury without any problems and went on to wrestle tag matches, cruiserweight-style matches, and even wrestled Mike Awesome for the ECW World Heavyweight Championship at Living Dangerously on March 12, 2000, although he lost after he was superbombed from the top rope through a table. His tag team partners during the time included the likes of Rob Van Dam, Super Crazy, Nova and The Sandman. Kash won the ECW World Television Championship by defeating Rhino on August 26, 2000, at Midtown Massacre. A few weeks later, Rhino would reclaim the title from Kash. On October 1 at Anarchy Rulz, Kash pinned EZ Money in a singles match. At November to Remember, Kash defeated C. W. Anderson. On December 3 at Massacre on 34th Street, he and Super Crazy were defeated by the Unholy Alliance (Yoshihiro Tajiri and Mikey Whipwreck) in a tag team match. At Guilty as Charged, he and Super Crazy and F.B.I. (Little Guido and Tony Mamaluke) were both defeated by the Unholy Alliance in a three-way dance tag team match. After Guilty as Charged, the promotion went defunct.

=== World Championship Wrestling (2001) ===
Two months later after ECW closed down, Kash was signed with World Championship Wrestling (WCW) where he was billed as "Cash". His only match on the final episode of Thunder, airing on March 21, 2001, where he lost to Jason Jett. That same week, WCW was purchased by the World Wrestling Federation in 5 days later after the final episode of Monday Nitro on March 26, 2001.

=== NWA Total Nonstop Action (2002–2005) ===
On August 14, 2002, Kash re-emerged in TNA Wrestling as part of the X Division. Using the gimmick of a cocky, obnoxious heel (while still maintaining a degree of his Kid Rock mannerisms), Kash won the TNA X Division Championship from Sonny Siaki on February 12, 2003 and lost the title to Amazing Red on April 30. Some of the more notable feuds Kid Kash developed in TNA were against James Storm, Dusty Rhodes, Jeff Hardy, A.J. Styles, and even a few intergender matches with Trinity. Also, Kash faced off against legends such as "Rowdy" Roddy Piper and Larry Zbyszko. He even beat his trainer, Ricky Morton.

On March 31, 2004, Kash teamed up with Dallas to win the NWA World Tag Team Championship and the pair picked the titles up a second time on April 21 before losing them to America's Most Wanted in June 2004. On April 20, 2005, TNA announced that Kash was released from his TNA contract, after months of criticizing the company. He signed with WWE after being released from TNA.

=== World Wrestling Entertainment (2005–2006) ===
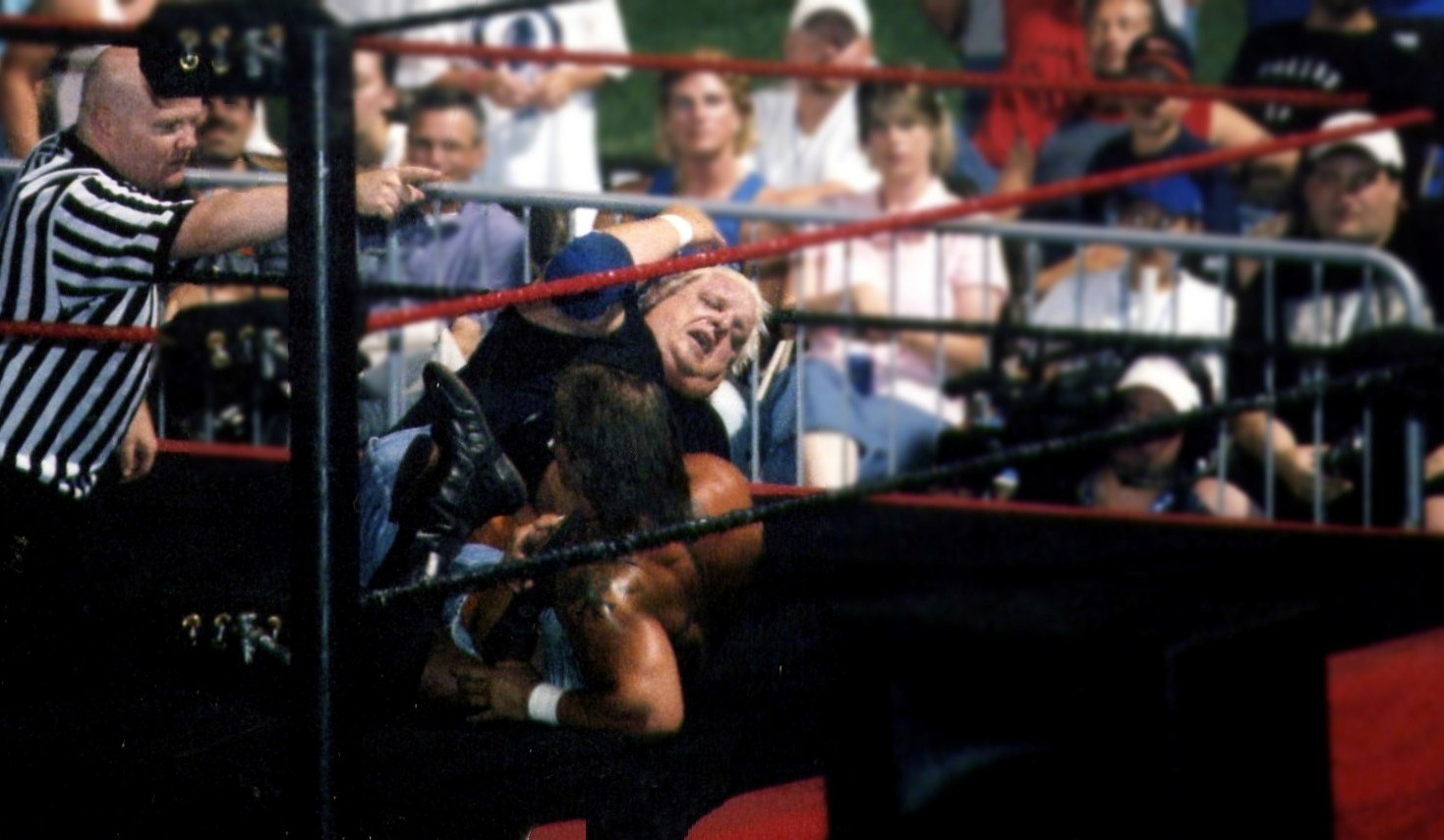
Kash performing a figure-four leglock on Dusty Rhodes in 2005.

Kash's first appearance on television was as one of many interferers in the main event at ECW One Night Stand. His first official WWE outing, however, was the June 19, 2005 airing of Sunday Night Heat against Tajiri in what was designated a tryout match. On June 23 he said in an interview that "You never know what the company is looking for. I might not be what they're looking for. I can only hope", indicating that he continued to pursue a WWE contract. That same month he was reported to have signed a developmental deal with WWE and to have been assigned to Deep South Wrestling, Kash then wrestled a few matches on Velocity, before coming up to the SmackDown! brand. Kash showed up after tag team match between MNM and The Mexicools on SmackDown!, and viciously attacking Juventud. The following week, he faced off against Mexicool member, Super Crazy. Kash picked up the win, earning himself a title match with Juventud at Armageddon. Kash made his first WWE pay-per-view debut on December 18 at Armageddon, Kash defeated Juventud to win the Cruiserweight Championship. On January 29 at the Royal Rumble, Kash lost the Cruiserweight Championship to Gregory Helms.

After losing the Cruiserweight Championship, Kash began to frequently tag team with Jamie Noble to take on the face members of the cruiserweight division; during May 2006, Kash and Noble used a gimmick previously seen in ECW, where they wore dog collars, often barked at and bit opponents, and wrestled rather aggressively and soon after the team formed Kash has got a new haircut. The pair were soon named The Pit Bulls and entered the hunt for Paul London and Brian Kendrick's WWE Tag Team Championship. On July 23 at The Great American Bash, he and Noble were defeated by London and Kendrick, this was Kash's last WWE pay-per-view appearance. His last WWE appearance was on the September 29 episode of SmackDown!, Kash and Noble lost to K. C. James and Idol Stevens in a tag team match. On September 27, 2006, WWE announced that Kash was released from his WWE contract. Kash would later admit that his release was due to him being caught smoking weed backstage at a WWE event in Montreal, Canada.

=== Independent circuit (2006–2010) ===
Kash made an appearance on Real Quality Wrestling which shows on The Fight Network in the United Kingdom. He spent time working in several European promotions, like One Pro Wrestling, as well as in Tewkesbury for top midlands promotion Pro Championship Wrestling, and also in Waterford, Ireland for Irish Whip Wrestling. Kash wrestled frequently for promotions in Nashville, where he resides. Most notably NWA Southern All-Star Wrestling, where he held their title multiple times. In August 2009, Kid Kash made appearances across Skegness and Cleethorpes, working with Real Deal Wrestling for their Summer Slamfest.

=== Return to TNA Wrestling (2010, 2011–2013) ===
On August 8, 2010, Kash returned to TNA to take part in ECW reunion show, Hardcore Justice, Kash, Simon Diamond and Johnny Swinger were defeated by Little Guido, Tony Luke and Tracy Smothers in a six-man tag team match. At the following day's tapings of TNA Impact!, Kash wrestled in a dark match, but losing to Okada. On June 13, 2011, at the tapings of the June 16 edition of Impact Wrestling, Kash made a one night return to TNA, losing to Austin Aries in a three way first round match of a tournament for a TNA contract, which also included Jimmy Rave.

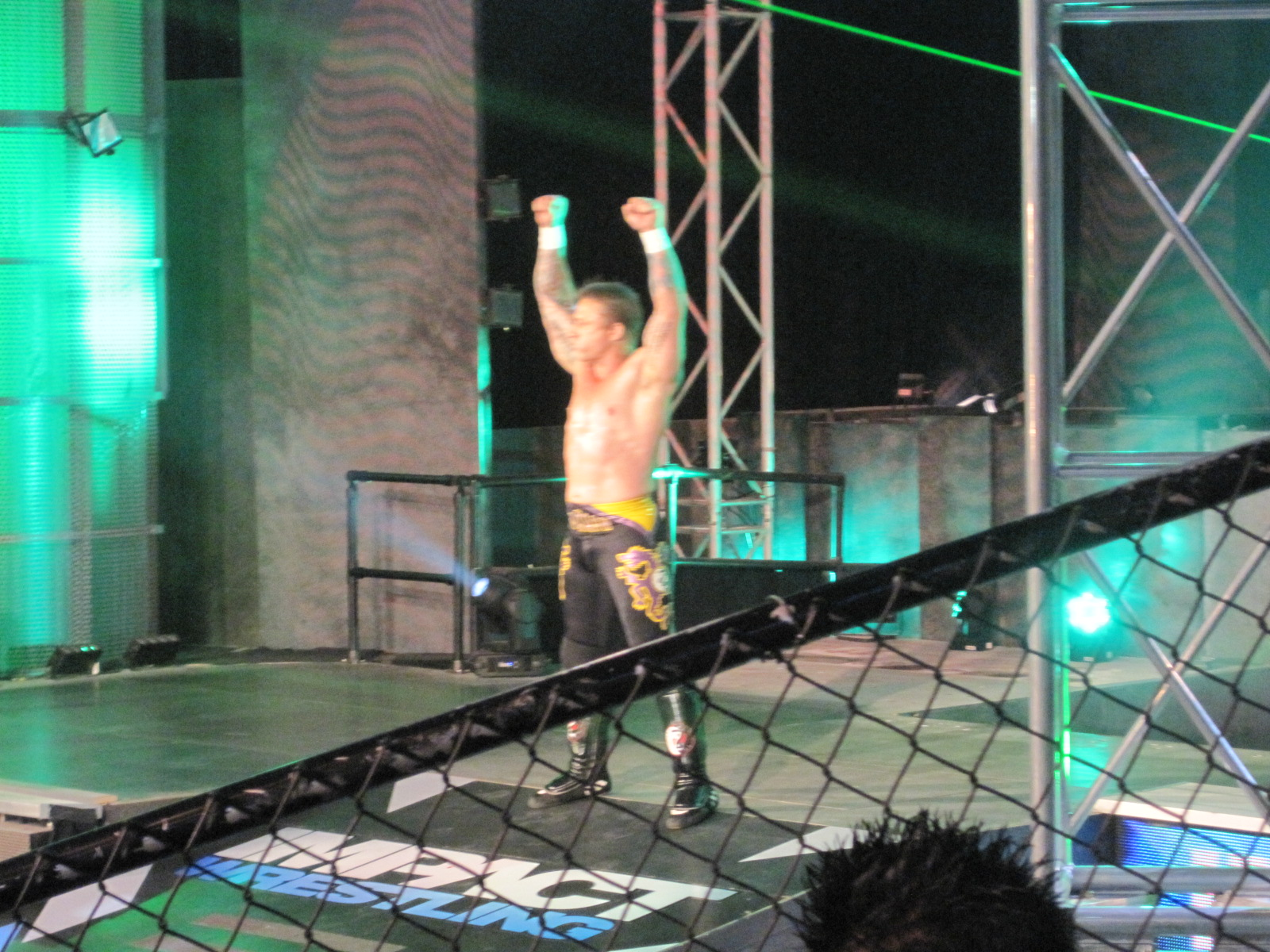
Kash returning to TNA in 2011.

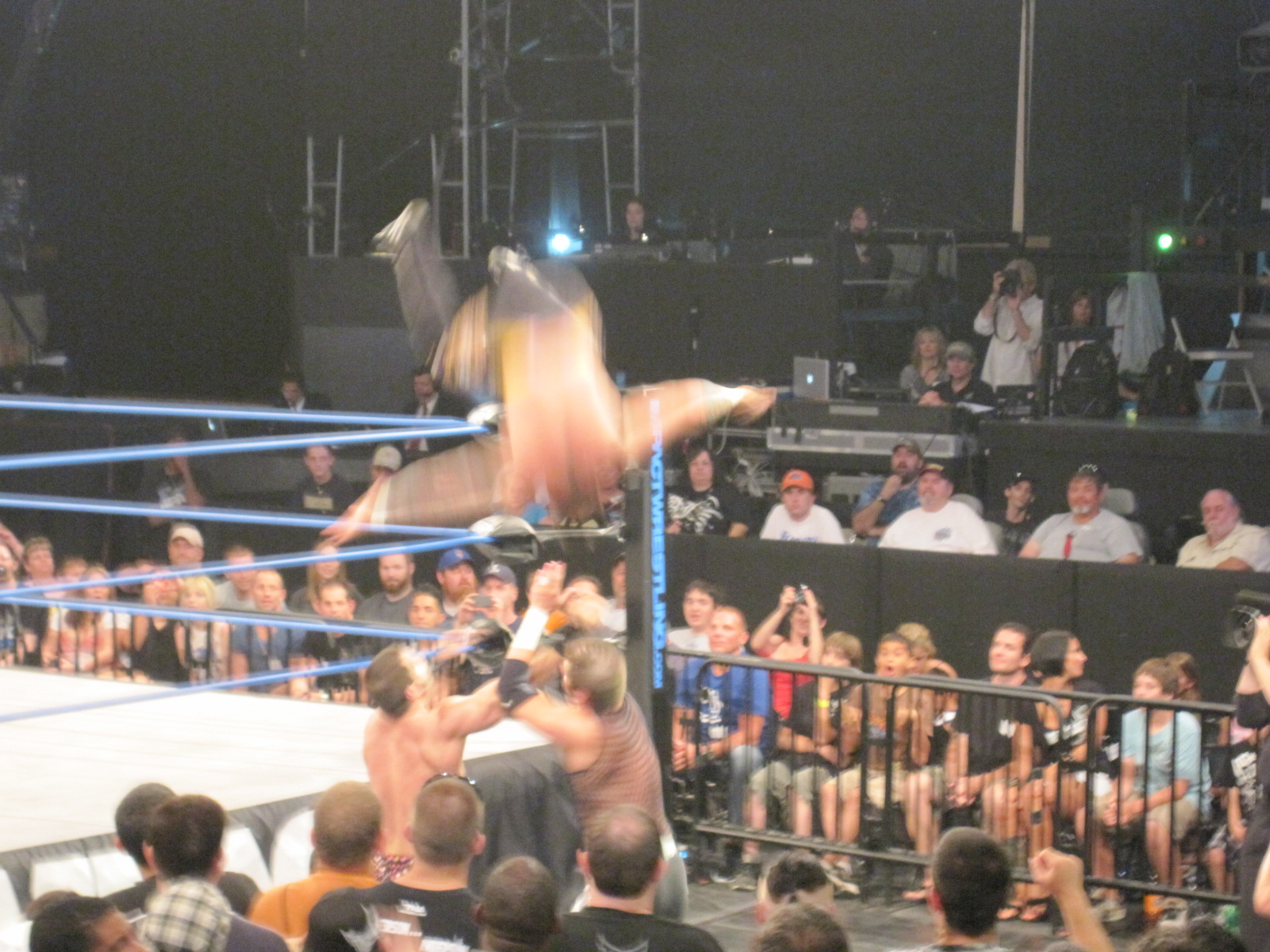
Kash performing a somersault plancha onto Austin Aries and Jimmy Rave in 2011.

On July 12, 2011, Kash announced that he had re-signed with TNA. Kash made his return to TNA on the August 11 edition of Impact Wrestling, appearing in a backstage segment, Eric Bischoff introduced new rules to the X Division. The following week Kash took part in a gauntlet match to determine the number one contender to the X Division Championship. After being eliminated from the match by Jesse Sorensen, Kash gave him a Money Maker and cost him the match. The following week later, Kash defeated Sorensen in a singles match with a rollup, while holding his tights. On the September 1 edition of Impact Wrestling, Sorensen pinned Kash in a tag team match, Kash teamed with Austin Aries and Sorensen with Brian Kendrick. On September 11 at No Surrender, Jesse Sorensen defeated Kash in an X Division number one contender's match. On the October 6 episode of Impact Wrestling, Kash attacked Brian Kendrick for disrespect on him. On November 13 at Turning Point, Kash failed to capture the X Division Championship from Aries in a three-way match, which also included Sorensen. The following month at Final Resolution, Kash failed to capture the X Division Championship in a singles match with Aries. On January 8 at Genesis, Kash was eliminated from a four way X Division Championship match, which also included Austin Aries, Jesse Sorensen and Zema Ion. On January 21 at TNA live house show, Kash suffered a broken nose during a three-way match against Jesse Sorensen and Shannon Moore, rendering him inactive for two months. Kash returned from injury on the March 22 edition of Impact Wrestling, participating in a four-way match for the X Division Championship that ended in a no contest, following interference from Bully Ray.

Kash returned to pay-per-view on June 10 at Slammiversary, he was defeated by Hernandez in a singles match. On July 8 at Destination X, Kash entered a tournament to determine the new X Division Champion, but was defeated in his first round match by Mason Andrews. Kash returned to Impact Wrestling on July 26, he along with Gunner, confronted and eventually attacked the debuting Chavo Guerrero Jr., before Guerrero was saved by Hernandez. The following week later, Kash was defeated by Guerrero in Guerrero's TNA debut match. On August 12 at Hardcore Justice, Kash and Gunner were defeated in a tag team match by Guerrero and Hernandez. Kash and Gunner faced Guerrero and Hernandez, now the TNA World Tag Team Champions, in a rematch on the October 18 episode of Impact Wrestling, but were again defeated. On the November 15 episode of Impact Wrestling Kash unsuccessfully challenged Rob Van Dam for the X Division Championship. It was reported in early November 2012 that Kid Kash would begin working for Ohio Valley Wrestling, the developmental territory for TNA. He made his debut on the November 14 tapings as the newest member of the Platoon of Wayne. He made his in-ring debut the same night in a winning effort against Elvis Pridemoore. He made an appearance on the December 1 edition of OVW in a segment between the Platoon of Wayne and James "Moose" Thomas. On December 5, episode of TNA Xplosion, he was defeated by Samoa Joe. On the December 6 episode of Impact Wrestling, he competed in a three-way match to determine #1 Contender for the X Division Title at Final Resolution that was won by Kenny King. On the January 3 episode of Impact Wrestling, Kash lost to Christian York, this was Kash's last appearance in TNA. After one month inactivity, TNA announced that Kash was released from his TNA contract on February 2, 2013.

=== Late career and first retirement (2013–2015) ===
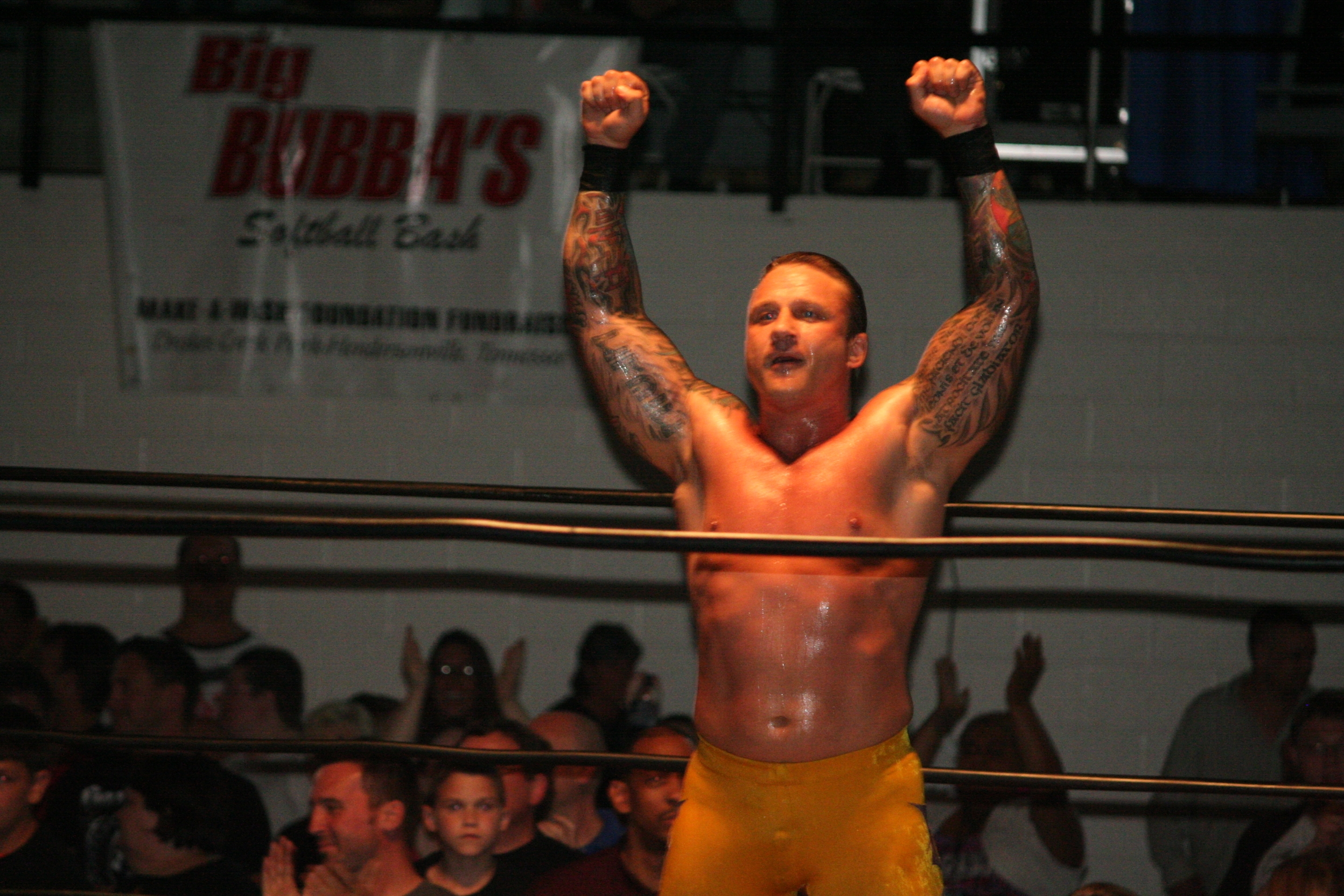
Kash wrestling on the independent circuit in May 2012.

After his TNA release on January 5, 2013, at the Crossfire 2nd Anniversary Event, Kash and his tag team partner, Josh Shockman, were defeated by Jerry Lynn and Ricky Morton. On March 2, 2013, Kash defeated Little Guido but lost a three-way match for vacant HRT heavyweight title which was won by Angel. On April 13, Kash faced IWC Super Indy champion Tony Nese but failed to win the title. On April 14, at an IWC show, Kid Kash defeated Facade. On May 25, 2013, at a $FW event Kash and Doug William faced Owen Phoenix and Ultimo Dragon in a losing effort. On June 16, 2013, Kash and Stan Lee competed at the Brad Armstrong Memorial Event where they were defeated by Cerebus and K. C. Thunder. On September 9, Kash faced Chris Michaels in a losing effort. On November 18, 2014, Kash would lose to VsK at a VPW show. L

In September 2015, Kash kicked off his retirement tour where he and Ricky Morton faced Jeff Connelly and Brian Montgomery in a losing effort. Kash and Morton argued after the match. In December 2015, Kash wrestled in a losing effort against Chase Owens, where the stipulation was if Kash won Ricky Morton would retire and if Owens won Kash would retire.

=== In-ring return and second retirement (2018–2020) ===
In January 2018, at IWR's When Worlds Collide event, he teamed with Ky-ote as part of the Arrow Club in a losing battle against the Von Erichs - Ross and Marshall. L On August 11, Kash returned as a member of the Arrow Club at World Class Revolution Pro Wrestling, where he and Ky-ote defeated the Von Erich brothers, as well as Prince Mahalli and Rasheed Ali, for the World Class Tag Team Titles.

Kash returned to TNA then called Impact Wrestling. He wrestled his two last matches of his career on March 6 and 7 in Atlanta just before COVID-19, before retiring from wrestling once again.

== Mixed martial arts career ==
Kid Kash
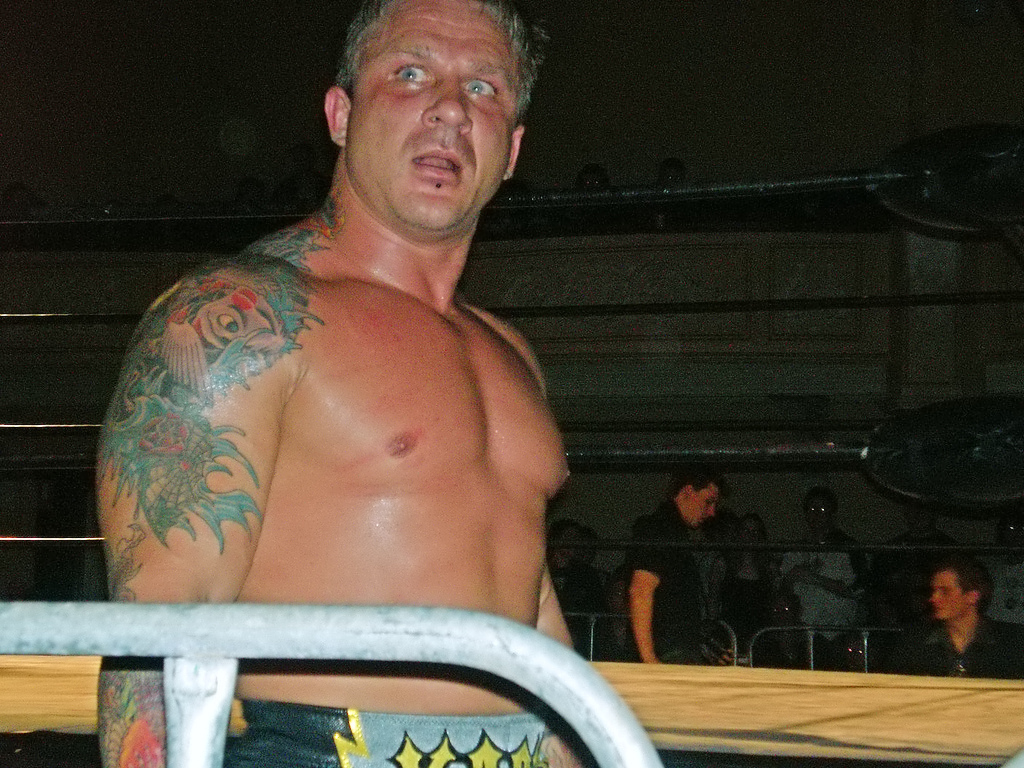
- Born: David Tyler Cash; July 31, 1969 (age 57); Waynesboro, Virginia
- Nationality: American
- Height: 5 ft 9 in (1.75 m)
- Weight: 170 lb (77 kg; 12 st)
- Division: Welterweight
- Fighting out of: Nashville, Tennessee
- Years active: 2016–present

Mixed martial arts record
- Total: 1
- Losses: 1
- By knockout: 1

On November 5, 2016, Kash made his pro MMA debut at Valor Fights 38. He was knocked out in 39 seconds by Lindsey Jones.

== Championships and accomplishments ==
- Assault Championship Wrestling
  - Dave Vicious Memorial Cup (2004)
- Extreme Championship Wrestling
  - ECW World Television Championship (1 time)
- Fighting Spirit Federation
  - High Flying Tournament (2007)
- Juggalo Championship Wrestling
  - JCW Heavyweight Championship (1 time)
- Memphis Wrestling
  - Memphis Wrestling Southern Tag Team Championship (1 time) – with Ricky Morton
- Pro Wrestling Illustrated
  - PWI ranked him #68 of the top 500 singles wrestlers in the PWI 500 in 2000
- Showtime All-Star Wrestling
  - SAW International Heavyweight Championship (3 times)
- Total Nonstop Action Wrestling
  - TNA X Division Championship (1 time)
  - NWA World Tag Team Championship (2 times) – with Dallas
  - NWA World Tag Team Championship Tournament (2004) – with Dallas
- United States Wrestling Organization
  - USWO Heavyweight Championship (2 times)
- World Class Revolution
  - WCR Tag Team Championship (1 time) – with Ky-ote
- Great American Wrestling Federation
  - GAWF Tag Team Championship (1 time) – with Ricky Morton
- World Wrestling Council
  - WWC Junior Heavyweight Championship (1 time)
- World Wrestling Entertainment
  - WWE Cruiserweight Championship (1 time)
- X Wrestling Federation
  - XWF World Cruiserweight Championship (2 time)

== Mixed martial arts record ==
Professional record breakdown
1 match	0 wins	1 loss
By knockout	0	1

Res.	Record	Opponent	Method	Event	Date	Round	Time	Location	Notes
Loss	0–1	Lindsey Jones	TKO (punches)	Valor Fights 38	November 5, 2016	1	0:39	Nashville, Tennessee, United States	
