= ECW on TNN =

- Created by: Paul Heyman
- Starring: See Extreme Championship Wrestling alumni
- Opening theme: "This is Extreme!" by Harry Slash & The Slashtones
- Country of origin: United States
- No. of episodes: 59

Production
- Production locations: ECW Arena, South Philadelphia Burt Flickinger Center, Buffalo NY
- Camera setup: Multicamera setup
- Running time: 60 minutes (with commercials)

Original release
- Network: The Nashville Network
- Release: August 27, 1999 – October 6, 2000

Related
- ECW Hardcore TV; WWE ECW

ECW on TNN, also known as ECW Wrestling, is an American professional wrestling television program that was produced by Extreme Championship Wrestling (ECW) and aired on The Nashville Network (TNN, now Paramount Network) on the Friday Night Thrill Zone block. Created by Paul Heyman, the owner of HHG Corporation (parent company of ECW), it presented original ECW matches on Friday nights and was the only national television program in ECW's history. It debuted on August 27, 1999 - five years to the date that Shane Douglas threw down the NWA World Heavyweight Championship and rechristened ECW (then known as Eastern Championship Wrestling) as Extreme Championship Wrestling. The final episode aired on October 6, 2000.

== History ==
=== Origin ===
In 1999, Heyman signed a three-year contract with TNN in the hopes of expanding national awareness of his company. Prior to ECW on TNN, ECW shows were only televised via syndication. For its part, TNN added ECW to its "Friday Night Thrill Zone" lineup in an attempt to help build on the increase in teenager/young male viewership that RollerJam had brought to the network. Into 2000, the network claimed a vast improvement in the young male demographic on Friday nights due to ECW's addition.

=== ECW–TNN differences ===
Early signs of a rocky relationship between ECW and TNN came when TNN president David Hall implied that the program would be "toned down" from the usual ECW fare – which emphasized more violent matches and explicit content than that offered by the two leading professional wrestling companies of the day, the World Wrestling Federation (WWF, now WWE) and World Championship Wrestling (WCW). On WWE's The Rise and Fall of ECW DVD, Heyman alleged that the requests from TNN to tone down ECW's content were excessive.

Another source of contention was the lack of original programming. Unsatisfied with the first TNN shoot, Heyman instead chose to air a compilation of promos and old ECW matches designed to act as an introduction to ECW for those who had never before heard of it or seen it. ECW commentator Joey Styles said that "the network crapped on" this episode, and ECW wrestler Tommy Dreamer's recollection supported this assertion.

TNN also had reportedly placed a great deal of importance on ECW retaining top star Taz. Initially, ECW announced that Taz signed a lucrative deal to remain with ECW. However, the deal fell through shortly thereafter and Taz signed a contract with the WWF just months after the show's premiere.

On Rise and Fall, former ECW producer Ron Buffone stated that TNN provided ECW with a very small budget to produce the program while simultaneously asking for high-quality production on par with WCW Monday Nitro and WWF Raw. Heyman and former ECW wrestlers also alleged a lack of promotion of the show by the network specifically and by its parent company Viacom in general.

The relationship between the promotion and the broadcaster was reflected in The Network stable, which became part of ECW's storylines during period the program aired.

=== Cancellation ===
ECW on TNN's run lasted thirteen and a half months. As part of an agreement between the WWF and TNN owner Viacom, Raw moved to TNN on September 25, 2000, coinciding with a major relaunch of the channel as The National Network. Heyman delivered a shoot promo live on air (announcing it as such). In the promo, he stated ECW hated TNN for "abandoning" them for not putting out commercials for them, demanding they throw ECW off the air and threatened to sue. Despite brief rumors that the two shows might co-exist on TNN for an extended period of time (in spite of the WWF agreement having an exclusivity clause), ECW on TNN was canceled only two weeks later. Paul Heyman stated on the Rise and Fall of ECW DVD that he felt that the ECW show was aired as a test run for TNN to see how wrestling would perform on the channel; former ECW wrestler Jerry Lynn would later agree with this opinion. In later years, Heyman also acknowledged that an effort he made to put ECW on the USA Network proved unsuccessful.

However, Raw continued to air on TNN/Spike TV (renamed to Paramount Network) until 2005 when it moved back to USA Network. TNN later added Excess to their professional wrestling lineup in 2001 and WWE Confidential and Velocity in 2002, and Sunday Night Heat in 2003. Spike later reached an agreement with a competitor, TNA Wrestling, to air its program TNA Impact! on the channel instead. TNA's run would last through 2014.

== See also ==
- ECW Hardcore TV
- List of professional wrestling television series
