= Living Dangerously =

Living Dangerously may refer to:

- Living Dangerously (wrestling series), a pay-per-view event produced by Extreme Championship Wrestling
  - Living Dangerously (1998)
  - Living Dangerously (1999)
  - Living Dangerously (2000)
- Living Dangerously (1936 film), a British drama film
- Living Dangerously (1987 film), a Greek film
- Living Dangerously (song), a 2014 single by Dami Im
- Living Dangerously (This Life), an episode of the British TV series This Life
