= Living Dangerously (wrestling series) =

- Promotions: Extreme Championship Wrestling
- First event: Living Dangerously (1998)
- Last event: Living Dangerously (2000)

Living Dangerously was a pay-per-view (PPV) event produced by Extreme Championship Wrestling (ECW) in March annually from 1998 to 2000. The event was also going to be held in 2001 on March 11 that year, but was cancelled due to the eventual collapse of the promotion.

== Dates, venues and main events ==
Event	Date	City	Venue	Main event
Living Dangerously (1998)	March 1, 1998	Asbury Park, New Jersey	Asbury Park Convention Hall	Shane Douglas and Chris Candido vs. Al Snow and Lance Storm
Living Dangerously (1999)	March 21, 1999	Asbury Park, New Jersey	Asbury Park Convention Hall	ECW World Heavyweight Champion Taz vs. FTW Heavyweight Champion Sabu in a Title unification Extreme Deathmatch for the ECW World Heavyweight Championship and the FTW Heavyweight Championship
Living Dangerously (2000)	March 12, 2000	Danbury, Connecticut	O'Neill Center	Super Crazy vs. Rhino in a tournament final for the vacant ECW World Television Championship
(c) – refers to the champion(s) heading into the match
