= ECW Guilty as Charged =

Guilty as Charged
- Promotions: Extreme Championship Wrestling
- First event: Guilty as Charged (1999)
- Last event: Guilty as Charged (2001)

Guilty as Charged was an annual professional wrestling pay-per-view (PPV) event produced by Extreme Championship Wrestling (ECW) held annually in January from 1999 to 2001. The 2001 event was ECW's last pay-per-view before declaring bankruptcy.

== Dates, venues and main events ==
Event	Date	City	Venue	Main event
Guilty as Charged (1999)	January 10, 1999	Millennium Theatre	Kissimmee, Florida	Shane Douglas (c) vs. Taz for the ECW World Heavyweight Championship
Guilty as Charged (2000)	January 9, 2000	Boutwell Memorial Auditorium	Birmingham, Alabama	Mike Awesome (c) vs. Spike Dudley for the ECW World Heavyweight Championship
Guilty as Charged (2001)	January 7, 2001	Hammerstein Ballroom	New York, New York	Rob Van Dam vs. Jerry Lynn
(c) – refers to the champion(s) heading into the match
