= Guilty as Charged (2001) =

2001 Extreme Championship Wrestling pay-per-view event

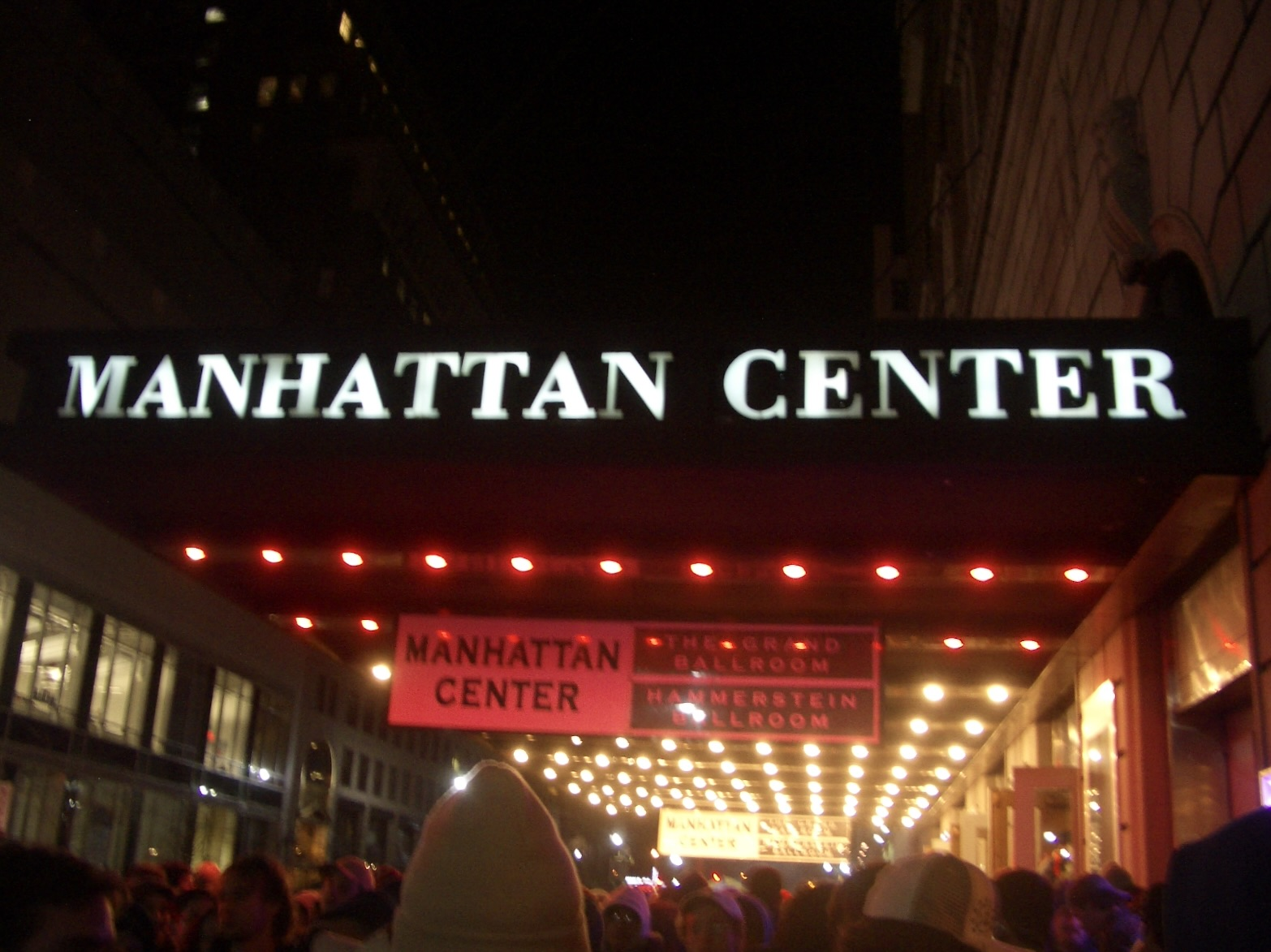
- The event was held at the Hammerstein Ballroom.
- Promotion: Extreme Championship Wrestling
- Date: January 7, 2001
- City: New York, New York
- Venue: Hammerstein Ballroom
- Attendance: 2,500
- Buy rate: 50,000

Pay-per-view chronology
← Previous; Massacre on 34th Street	Next → Final

ECW Guilty as Charged chronology
← Previous; 2000	Next → Final

Guilty as Charged (2001) was the third and final Guilty as Charged professional wrestling pay-per-view (PPV) event produced by Extreme Championship Wrestling (ECW). It took place on January 7, 2001, from the Hammerstein Ballroom in New York, New York. This was the final nationally and globally broadcast event held by the original and independent ECW before it filed for bankruptcy two months later that year. Advertisements aired by Time Warner Cable and In Demand originally promoted Scott Hall as appearing at the show until Paul Heyman had him pulled.

The main event was the first and only Tables, Ladders, Chairs and Canes match in ECW history for the ECW World Heavyweight Championship, in which Steve Corino defended the title against The Sandman and Justin Credible. Sandman won the title but then immediately defended the title against Rhino, who defeated Sandman to capture the title. Rhino issued an open challenge which was answered by Rob Van Dam, but Van Dam was attacked by Jerry Lynn, leading to an immediate contest between the duo, which Van Dam won.

Rob Van Dam versus Jerry Lynn was included on the 2005 WWE DVD release Rob Van Dam: One of a Kind. Tommy Dreamer versus CW Anderson was included on the 2006 WWE DVD release ECW Blood Sport: The Most Violent Matches. The Unholy Alliance (Yoshihiro Tajiri and Mikey Whipwreck) versus Kid Kash and Super Crazy versus The F.B.I. (Little Guido and Tony Mamaluke) was included on the 2012 WWE DVD and Blu-ray release ECW Unreleased: Vol 1.

== Event ==
=== Preliminary matches ===
The event kicked off with Joel Gertner interviewing The Bad Street Boys (Christian York and Joey Matthews) in the ring until Da Baldies attacked Bad Street Boys. This led to Cyrus and Jerry Lynn beginning a match against Bad Street Boys. Lynn delivered a cradle piledriver to Matthews and Lynn pinned him for the win.

Next, Danny Doring and Roadkill defended the World Tag Team Championship against Hot Commodity (Julio Dinero and E. Z. Money). Chris Hamrick's interference backfired on Money, leading to Doring and Roadkill delivering a Buggy Bang to Dinero to retain the titles. After the match, Hot Commodity attacked Doring and Roadkill until Nova returned to ECW and made the save, leading to Nova facing Chris Hamrick in a match. The referee was knocked out and then Hamrick covered Nova for the pinfall and Chris Chetti returned to ECW in a referee shirt and made a fast count, awarding the win to Hamrick. However, the original referee regained consciousness and revealed that Nova had his shoulder up, therefore Chetti's decision did not stand. Lou E. Dangerously knocked out the referee with his cell phone until Spike Dudley made the save and brawled with Chetti. Nova hit a senton bomb to Chetti and delivered a Kryptonite Krunch to Hamrick for the win, with Dudley counting the pinfall.

Next, Tommy Dreamer competed against C. W. Anderson in an "I Quit" match. Anderson brought a table into the ring but Dreamer hit him with a chair and delivered a Dreamer Driver from the top rope onto the table. He then got a piece of cable from the table and wrapped it around Anderson's head and pulled it back, which cut Anderson's eyes and he quit. After the match, Dreamer and Anderson shook hands with each other.

Later, Kid Kash and Super Crazy competed against the Unholy Alliance (Yoshihiro Tajiri and Mikey Whipwreck) and The F.B.I. (Little Guido and Tony Mamaluke) in a Three-Way Dance to determine the #1 contenders for the World Tag Team Championship. Sal E. Graziano interfered in the match by splashing Kash, allowing Mamaluke to pin him for the first elimination. The action then continued between Unholy Alliance and FBI. Tajiri kicked Guido in the head three times and sprayed mist into Mamaluke's eyes. Tajiri and Whipwreck delivered tiger suplexes to Mamaluke and Guido respectively to win the match.

In the penultimate match, Balls Mahoney and Chilly Willy took on Simon and Swinger. Swinger brought out The Blue Boy and Jasmin St. Claire along with him as he was dissatisfied with Dawn Marie's managerial services. Rhino interrupted the match by taking out everyone with Gores and then he drove Jasmin from the middle rope onto a table with a Rhino Spike.

=== Main event match ===
The scheduled main event of the show was a Tables, Ladders, Chairs & Canes match, in which Steve Corino defended the ECW World Heavyweight Championship against The Sandman and Justin Credible. After a back and forth match, Sandman climbed the ladder and grabbed the title belt to win the title. After the match, all three men shook hands and then Da Baldies showed up to fight Corino and Credible and the fight spilled to the backstage. Rhino hit a Gore to Sandman from behind and challenged him to a match for the title and threatened to hurt Sandman's family in the audience if Sandman did not give him a title shot and Sandman accepted the challenge. Rhino hit a Gore through a table and then delivered a Rhino Spike from the apron onto a table outside the ring. Rhino hit a Rhino Spike to Sandman on the broken table to win the title.

After the match, Cyrus issued an open challenge to anyone on behalf of Rhino and then Rob Van Dam came out to answer the open challenge and fight Rhino until Jerry Lynn attacked him from behind. This led to a match between Van Dam and Lynn. Van Dam attempted a Five-Star Frog Splash on Lynn but Cyrus prevented it but Van Dam managed to hit the move but Lynn ducked it. Joel Gertner hit a DDT to Cyrus and then he helped Van Dam in hitting a Van Daminator to Lynn for the win.

== Aftermath ==
Justin Credible and Steve Corino formed the New Impact Players and the seeds were planted for a possible Rob Van Dam vs. Rhino feud over the ECW World Heavyweight Championship.

The original plan was to have their next pay-per-view Living Dangerously air on March 11, 2001, indicating that ECW was cutting their pay-per-view schedule in half. However, by the end of the week, a house show in Pine Bluff, Arkansas on January 13 would end up being the promotion's final show ever. In February, it was announced that ECW cancelled the Living Dangerously pay-per-view. On March 5, Paul Heyman shocked the wrestling world by appearing on Monday Night Raw, reuniting with his former WCW colleague Jim Ross, replacing Jerry Lawler, who had just quit the WWF. In April 2001, ECW officially closed down.

== Reception ==
Arnold Furious of Wrestling Recaps wrote "ECW went all out to ensure that their last show would be exciting and it was. The aim was to consider the future, yet conclude every feud with the possibility that the company may fold. Hence RVD over Lynn, Rhino over Sandman, Sandman over Corino/Credible, Tajiri/Whipwreck over FBI, Dreamer over CW and the general jobbing of Hot Commodity. It finished up all the storyline arcs they had running. The company died with its story told."

Kevin Pantoja of 411Mania gave a score rating of 5 with "Only two matches on this show are really good. The I Quit match and the Three Way Tag match are damn good. Everything else is passable, though none of it is really bad. RVD and Lynn disappoint, but this is a recommended show, even if it’s mostly for historical purposes." Larry Csonka, also of 411Mania, gave a score rating of 6, writing "Overall not the greatest of PPV’s. A lot doesn’t hold up well in 2005, namely the 3-way ladder match. RVD and Lynn wasn’t nearly as good as past encounters, with RVD looking very rusty and stalling too much. The I QUIT match and 3-way tag were still as good as I remember and make this a fun show. But the real reason to own this is for historical reasons. It wasn’t ran as a “final” show, but knowing that it was you just get this feeling of completion when it comes to ECW. This was truly an end of an era in pro wrestling that still has a major impact today. Recommendation to own, especially if you loved ECW."

== Results ==
No.	Results	Stipulations	Times
1	Cyrus and Jerry Lynn defeated The Bad Street Boys (Christian York and Joey Matthews)	Tag team match	2:41
2	Danny Doring and Roadkill (c) defeated Hot Commodity (Julio Dinero and E. Z. Money) (with Chris Hamrick and Elektra)	Tag team match for the ECW World Tag Team Championship	10:06
3	Nova defeated Chris Hamrick (with Elektra)	Singles match	5:30
4	Tommy Dreamer defeated C. W. Anderson	"I Quit" match	14:11
5	The Unholy Alliance (Yoshihiro Tajiri and Mikey Whipwreck) (with Sinister Minister) defeated Kid Kash and Super Crazy and The F.B.I. (Little Guido and Tony Mamaluke) (with Sal E. Graziano)	Three-Way Dance to determine the #1 contenders for the ECW World Tag Team Championship	13:31
6	Simon and Swinger (with Dawn Marie, The Blue Boy and Jasmin St. Claire) vs. Balls Mahoney and Chilly Willy ended in a no-contest	Tag team match	0:48
7	The Sandman defeated Steve Corino (c) (with Jack Victory) and Justin Credible (with Francine)	Tables, Ladders, Chairs & Canes match for the ECW World Heavyweight Championship	13:20
8	Rhino defeated The Sandman (c)	Singles match for the ECW World Heavyweight Championship	1:00
9	Rob Van Dam defeated Jerry Lynn (with Cyrus)	Singles match	24:30
(c) / – the champion(s) heading into the match
