= Guilty as Charged (1999) =

1999 Extreme Championship Wrestling pay-per-view event

- Promotion: Extreme Championship Wrestling
- Date: January 10, 1999
- City: Kissimmee, Florida
- Venue: Millennium Theatre
- Attendance: 2,600
- Buy rate: 90,000

Pay-per-view chronology
← Previous; ECW/FMW Supershow	Next → Living Dangerously

ECW Guilty as Charged chronology
← Previous; First	Next → 2000

Guilty as Charged (1999) was the inaugural ECW Guilty as Charged professional wrestling pay-per-view (PPV) event produced by Extreme Championship Wrestling (ECW). The event took place on January 10, 1999 at the Millennium Theatre in Kissimmee, Florida.

The main event was a singles match between champion Shane Douglas and challenger Taz for the ECW World Heavyweight Championship. Taz won the title, ending Douglas' 406 day reign, the longest in the title's history. In the other notable matches on the card, Justin Credible defeated Tommy Dreamer in a Stairway to Hell match and Rob Van Dam defeated Lance Storm to retain the ECW World Television Championship.

Shane Douglas versus Taz was included on the 2012 WWE DVD and Blu-ray release ECW Unreleased: Vol 1.

== Event ==
=== Preliminary matches ===
The event kicked off with a tag team match between The F.B.I. (Little Guido and Tracy Smothers) and Danny Doring and Roadkill. The two teams went back and forth until The Hardcore Chair Swinging' Freaks (Axl Rotten and Balls Mahoney) joined the fight, making it a three-way dance. Doring and Roadkill executed a Lancaster Lariat of Lust on Guido and Doring covered him for the pinfall until Tommy Rich hit Doring in the head with the Italian flag and Guido and Smothers hit an aided brainbuster on Doring to eliminate him. The action continued between the two remaining teams until Mahoney nailed a Nutcracker Suite on Smothers and Rotten hit an inverted DDT to Guido to simultaneously pin both men for the win. After the match, Big Guido and Sal E. Graziano confronted Hardcore Chair Swingin' Freaks but Freaks chased them away with chair shots.

Next, Super Crazy competed against Yoshihiro Tajiri. Tajiri nailed a dragon suplex for the win.

Next, John Kronus came to the ring for his match and Judge Jeff Jones introduced Sid Vicious to ECW, who made his debut against Kronus. Sid chokeslammed Kronus onto a table outside the ring and then followed with three chair shots before tossing him back into the ring and executing a powerbomb for the win.

Later, New Jack and Spike Dudley took on The Dudley Boyz (Buh Buh Ray Dudley and D-Von Dudley). Dudley Boyz knocked out Jack by hitting a 3D to Jack on the ramp. Big Dick Dudley attacked Spike in the ring but Spike countered with an eye rake and executed an Acid Drop to Big Dick and then hit an Acid Drop to D-Von and covered him for the pinfall. Buh Buh hit a big splash on Spike to break the pinfall but Spike moved out and D-Von was accidentally splashed. Spike then nailed an Acid Drop to Buh Buh and covered him for the pinfall but Big Dick attempted to hit a splash and Spike moved out of it and Buh Buh was splashed. Spike then tried to hit an Acid Drop to Big Dick but he tossed him away and Dudley Boyz hit a 3D on Spike for the win. After the match, Dudley Boyz attacked New Jack.

In the following match, Rob Van Dam was scheduled to defend the World Television Championship against Masato Tanaka but Lance Storm substituted for Tanaka. After a back and forth match, RVD nailed a German suplex to Storm for the win.

The penultimate match was a Stairway to Hell match between Tommy Dreamer and Justin Credible. Terry Funk interfered in the match and turned on Dreamer by hitting him with a trashcan. Credible hit him with a cane and nailed a That's Incredible for the win. After the match, Funk continued to attack Dreamer with the trashcan.

=== Main event match ===
Shane Douglas defended the World Heavyweight Championship against Taz in the main event. During the match, Sabu made his return from injury (still wearing a neck brace) and attacked both Douglas and Taz. Douglas later called The Triple Threat and then Tammy Lynn Sytch came to the ring and got involved in a fight with Francine. This prompted Chris Candido to come to stop the fight but Francine speared Sytch and Candido turned on Douglas by punching him and leaving with Sytch. This allowed Taz to nail a T-Bone Tazplex and apply a Tazmission to win the title.

== Reception ==
The event has received mixed reviews from critics.

In 2004, Scott Keith of 411Mania gave a "recommendation to avoid", stating "Even by my lowered standards for ECW, this show was pretty brutal, with a bad top of the card and the only real highlight being the Crazy-Tajiri match that ended up kicking off Tajiri’s improbable success in the US. As for the rest, forget it, it’s not worth your time."

In 2011, David of Wrestling Recaps wrote "It’s amazing what a main event can do to the worth of the whole card. Douglas and Taz could have saved the show, but they had a ramshackle match that didn’t leave anyone feeling satisfied. The Tajiri/Super Crazy match is the reason to check this out, with Van Dam/Storm being a bonus. Thumbs down."

In 2022, Michael Fitzgerald of Scott's Blog of Doom! described the event as a "recommended show," stating, "This is probably one of ECW’s better pay per view events, with Crazy/Tajiri, Storm/RVD and Credible/Dreamer all being good and nothing being especially bad, with even the New Jack match being entertaining and the Sid match working within the context of what it was supposed to be. It’s a shame they couldn’t end it on a stronger note with a better Main Event, but the rest of the card held up and there were enough good to great matches that I’d be happy giving the show as a whole a thumbs up."

== Results ==
No.	Results	Stipulations	Times
1	The Hardcore Chair Swinging' Freaks (Axl Rotten and Balls Mahoney) defeated The F.B.I. (Little Guido and Tracy Smothers) (with Tommy Rich, Big Guido and Sal E. Graziano), and Danny Doring and Roadkill	Three-Way Dance	10:43
2	Yoshihiro Tajiri defeated Super Crazy	Singles match	11:37
3	Sid Vicious (with Judge Jeff Jones) defeated John Kronus	Singles match	1:31
4	The Dudley Boyz (Buh Buh Ray and D-Von) (with Joel Gertner, Big Dick Dudley and Sign Guy Dudley) defeated New Jack and Spike Dudley	Tag team match	10:01
5	Rob Van Dam (c) (with Bill Alfonso) defeated Lance Storm (with Dawn Marie)	Singles match for the ECW World Television Championship	18:50
6	Justin Credible (with Jason, Jazz and Nicole Bass) defeated Tommy Dreamer	Stairway To Hell match	18:45
7	Taz defeated Shane Douglas (c) (with Francine) by submission	Singles match for the ECW World Heavyweight Championship	22:15
(c) / – the champion(s) heading into the match
