= Guilty as Charged (2000) =

2000 Extreme Championship Wrestling pay-per-view event

- Promotion: Extreme Championship Wrestling
- Date: January 9, 2000
- City: Birmingham, Alabama
- Venue: Boutwell Memorial Auditorium
- Attendance: 4,700
- Buy rate: 75,000

Pay-per-view chronology
← Previous; November to Remember	Next → Living Dangerously

ECW Guilty as Charged chronology
← Previous; 1999	Next → 2001

Guilty as Charged (2000) was the second ECW Guilty as Charged professional wrestling pay-per-view (PPV) event produced by Extreme Championship Wrestling (ECW). It took place on January 9, 2000 from the Boutwell Memorial Auditorium in Birmingham, Alabama.

In the main event, Mike Awesome defeated Spike Dudley in a singles match to retain the ECW World Heavyweight Championship. In the undercard, The Impact Players (Justin Credible and Lance Storm) defeated Tommy Dreamer and Raven to win the ECW World Tag Team Championship, while Rob Van Dam retained the ECW World Television Championship against Sabu.

== Event ==
=== Preliminary matches ===
The event kicked off with a match between Mikey Whipwreck and C. W. Anderson. Lou E. Dangerously struck Whipwreck with his cell phone and Anderson delivered an Anderson Spinebuster to Whipwreck for the win.

Next, Nova, Kid Kash and Jazz competed against the team of Simon Diamond, Danny Doring and Roadkill. Kash, Jazz, Diamond and Diamond's returning bodyguard "Big" Dick Hurtz brawled with each other and their fight spilled to the backstage, leaving the action to Nova against Doring and Roadkill. Chris Chetti joined the match to wrestle alongside Nova. A distraction by Elektra allowed Roadkill to deliver an Amish Splash to Chetti for the win. After the match, The Dupps (Bo, Jack and Puck) attacked Roadkill and Chetti until Nova and Doring chased them away with steel chairs.

Next, Super Crazy and Yoshihiro Tajiri competed against Jerry Lynn and Little Guido in a tag team match. Guido turned on Lynn by hitting a Sicilian Slice on Lynn and left and then Tajiri followed by delivering a brainbuster to Lynn for the win. After the match, Corino and Tajiri joined by Jack Victory and Tommy Rich, would attack Lynn and insult the fans and Dusty Rhodes. Rhodes would make his surprise debut from the crowd, attacking them until Rhino beat him down. The locker room would empty to save Rhodes from Corino's entourage.

In the following match, New Jack took on Angel. The interference by Da Baldies allowed Angel to hit Jack over the head with a shovel for the win.

Later, Rob Van Dam defended the World Television Championship against Sabu, which stipulated that Sabu would leave ECW if he lost the match. RVD dropkicked the chair into Bill Alfonso's face when Alfonso tried to prevent RVD from using the chair. Sabu attacked RVD and attempted to hit a triple jump moonsault but RVD nailed the chair in Sabu's ribs and delivered a Five-Star Frog Splash to Sabu to retain the title.

Tommy Dreamer and Raven defended the World Tag Team Championship against The Impact Players (Lance Storm and Justin Credible) in the penultimate match. Dawn Marie and Francine got involved in a brawl with each other. Francine hit a bronco buster to Marie and then Credible attempted to hit a kendo stick on Francine but Raven got in the way to save Francine and got hit with it. Credible then delivered a That's Incredible to Raven to win the titles.

=== Main event match ===
Mike Awesome defended the World Heavyweight Championship against Spike Dudley in the main event. Awesome delivered an Awesome Bomb to Dudley from the top rope, through a table to retain the title.

== Reception ==
John Powell of the SLAM! Sports section of Canadian Online Explorer rated the event 4 out of 10, stating "ECW tried to mimic the competition cramming the show with more mike work than a livestock auction in Calgary, Alberta, Canada. The outcome was a meandering pay-per-view bereft of any momentum or clarity. Even a high voltage Sabu - RVD bout couldn't save the show." He criticized the idea of the main event between Mike Awesome and Spike Dudley for the World Heavyweight Championship and did not consider Dudley a deserving contender for the World Heavyweight Championship.

Nick Sellers of 411Mania gave Guilty as Charged, a rating of 6.5, writing "The last three matches are all good examples of ECW's brand of wrestling, which in turn features some of the most notable workers of its existence. The world title match probably shouldn't have headlined the show, but Awesome's athleticism and Spike's stint as a crash test dummy were fun to watch. The TV title clash is balls to the wall action with some great gymnastry and the tag title bout had its fair share of good action. The rest is totally irrelevant and not worth tracking down. Even with that said, a PPV is only really as good as its headline matches, all of which delivered. Thumbs leaning up for the fun factor alone."

== Results ==
No.	Results	Stipulations	Times
1	C. W. Anderson (with Lou E. Dangerously and Billy Wiles) defeated Mikey Whipwreck	Singles match	3:42
2	Danny Doring, Roadkill and Simon Diamond (with Mitch and Elektra) defeated Nova, Kid Kash and Jazz	Six-man tag team match	9:58
3	Yoshihiro Tajiri and Super Crazy (with Steve Corino) defeated Little Guido and Jerry Lynn (with Big Sal E. Graziano)	Tag team match	12:48
4	Angel (with DeVito and Vic Grimes) defeated New Jack	Singles match	8:48
5	Rob Van Dam (c) defeated Sabu	Singles match for the ECW World Television Championship	14:37
6	The Impact Players (Lance Storm and Justin Credible) (with Dawn Marie and Jason) defeated Tommy Dreamer and Raven (c) (with Francine)	Tag team match for the ECW World Tag Team Championship	9:23
7	Mike Awesome (c) (with Judge Jeff Jones) defeated Spike Dudley	Singles match for the ECW World Heavyweight Championship	14:10
(c) / – the champion(s) heading into the match
