= Championship unification =

Combining two or more professional wrestling championships into a single championship

Championship unification is the act of combining two or more separate professional wrestling championships into a single title.

== History ==
In professional wrestling, championships may be unified to consolidate the number of championships in a given promotion, or to add legitimacy and prestige to a certain title's lineage. In a title-for-title match, one of three things will happen:

- One of the championships is dropped (the remaining championship may also be renamed)
  - Example: The Undisputed WWF Championship was the result of the unification between the WWF (now WWE) Championship and WCW World Heavyweight Championship. The Undisputed Championship retained the lineage of the WWF Championship and the WCW World Heavyweight Championship was retired.
- A brand new championship is created with both/all championships involved in the unification either dropped, held together and represented under the new championship, or one of the championships is restored in favor of the unified championship, with holders of the unified championship recognized as holding both/all championships during the existence of the unified championship.
  - Example 1: The AEW Unified Championship was the result of the unification between the AEW International Championship and AEW Continental Championship. The new championship has its own lineage despite the fact that the two championships that were unified maintain their separate lineages and names.
  - Example 2: The IWGP World Heavyweight Championship was the result of the unification between the IWGP Heavyweight Championship and the IWGP Intercontinental Championship. Originally, the IWGP World Heavyweight Championship did not carry the lineage of either former title, but after the IWGP Heavyweight Championship was restored in favor of the IWGP World Heavyweight Championship, holders of the unified championship were recognized as both IWGP Heavyweight and IWGP Intercontinental Champions.
- Both/all championships remain active and are defended and lost together under one name, but title changes reflect each individual title's history. This remains until either the titles are split or one or more titles are dropped in favor of the other.
  - Example 1: The Undisputed WWE Universal Championship was the result of the unification between the WWE Championship and the WWE Universal Championship. Both championships were defended together under the same name but keep their lineages separate until the WWE Universal Championship was retired while the WWE Championship went forward as the Undisputed WWE Championship.
  - Example 2: The Undisputed WWE Tag Team Championship was the result of the unification between the WWE Raw Tag Team Championship and WWE Smackdown Tag Team Championship. Both championships were defended together under the same name but keep their lineages separate until they were split back into separate championships.

=== Notable events ===
- The first two prominent unifications of titles in the United States were done by Nikita Koloff. In 1986, Koloff unified the NWA National Heavyweight Championship into his NWA United States Heavyweight Championship by defeating Wahoo McDaniel, and in 1987 he unified the (Mid-South) UWF Television Championship into his NWA World Television Championship by defeating Terry Taylor. In both cases, the unification process was started by Nikita's home promotion, Jim Crockett Promotions, upon absorbing another promotion (Georgia Championship Wrestling and the Mid-South UWF, respectively), and in both cases the titles from the absorbed promotions were abandoned.
- The Triple Crown Heavyweight Championship was created with the unification of the NWA International Heavyweight Championship, the PWF World Heavyweight Championship, and the NWA United National Championship, when the NWA International Heavyweight Champion Jumbo Tsuruta defeated the PWF World Heavyweight and NWA United National Champion Stan Hansen on April 18, 1989.
- The Omaha World Heavyweight Championship (a championship belt created by promoters in Omaha, Nebraska) unified with the AWA World Heavyweight Championship when the titles were unified on September 7, 1963, when AWA World Heavyweight Champion Verne Gagne defeated Omaha World Heavyweight Champion Fritz Von Erich in Omaha, Nebraska. The Omaha version was abandoned after being absorbed into the AWA World Heavyweight Championship.
- The AWA World Heavyweight Championship and the WCWA World Heavyweight Championship were unified to create the USWA Unified World Heavyweight Championship at SuperClash III, when the AWA World Heavyweight Champion Jerry "The King" Lawler defeated the WCCW World Heavyweight Champion Kerry Von Erich. The WCCW World Heavyweight Championship was quickly abandoned, and later the American Wrestling Association stripped the AWA World Heavyweight Championship from Jerry Lawler.
- The J-Crown, a combination of eight lightweight championships from various wrestling promotions, was defended mostly in Japan and Mexico, and is most closely associated with Último Dragón. Between November 24, 1996 and January 4, 1997 Último Dragón held the WWF Light Heavyweight title simultaneously with the WCW Cruiserweight title. The J-Crown has since been abandoned and all championship belts were returned to their home promotions.
- The WCW International World Heavyweight Championship was unified with the WCW World Heavyweight Championship when WCW World Heavyweight Champion Ric Flair defeated WCW International World Heavyweight Champion Sting at Clash of the Champions XXVII. The WCW International World Heavyweight Championship was immediately abandoned, although the physical championship belt was used as the WCW World Heavyweight Championship as it originally had been in 1991.
- The ECW FTW Heavyweight Championship (an unrecognized title created by Tazz) was unified with the ECW World Heavyweight Championship on March 21, 1999 at Living Dangerously when ECW World Heavyweight Champion Taz defeated ECW FTW Heavyweight Champion Sabu. The FTW title was then abandoned, as Taz continued to defend the ECW World title. The FTW title, however, was reintroduced in the promotion All Elite Wrestling (AEW) in 2020 and was defended until its second retirement in September 2024.
- The WCW United States Championship was unified with the WWF Intercontinental Championship on November 18, 2001 at Survivor Series when United States Champion Edge defeated Intercontinental Champion Test. The United States title was then deactivated, but was later revived as the WWE United States Championship in 2003 by Stephanie McMahon as a SmackDown!-exclusive title.
- The WCW Tag Team Championship was unified with the WWF Tag Team Championship at Survivor Series in 2001 when the WCW Tag Team Champions The Dudley Boyz defeated the WWF Tag Team Champions The Hardy Boyz. The WCW Tag Team Championship was then unified into the WWF Tag Team Championship and was subse retired. The titles had previously been unified at SummerSlam (2001) when WCW Tag Team Champions The Brothers of Destruction defeated WWF Tag Team Champions Diamond Dallas Page and Chris Kanyon but both championships were independently active.

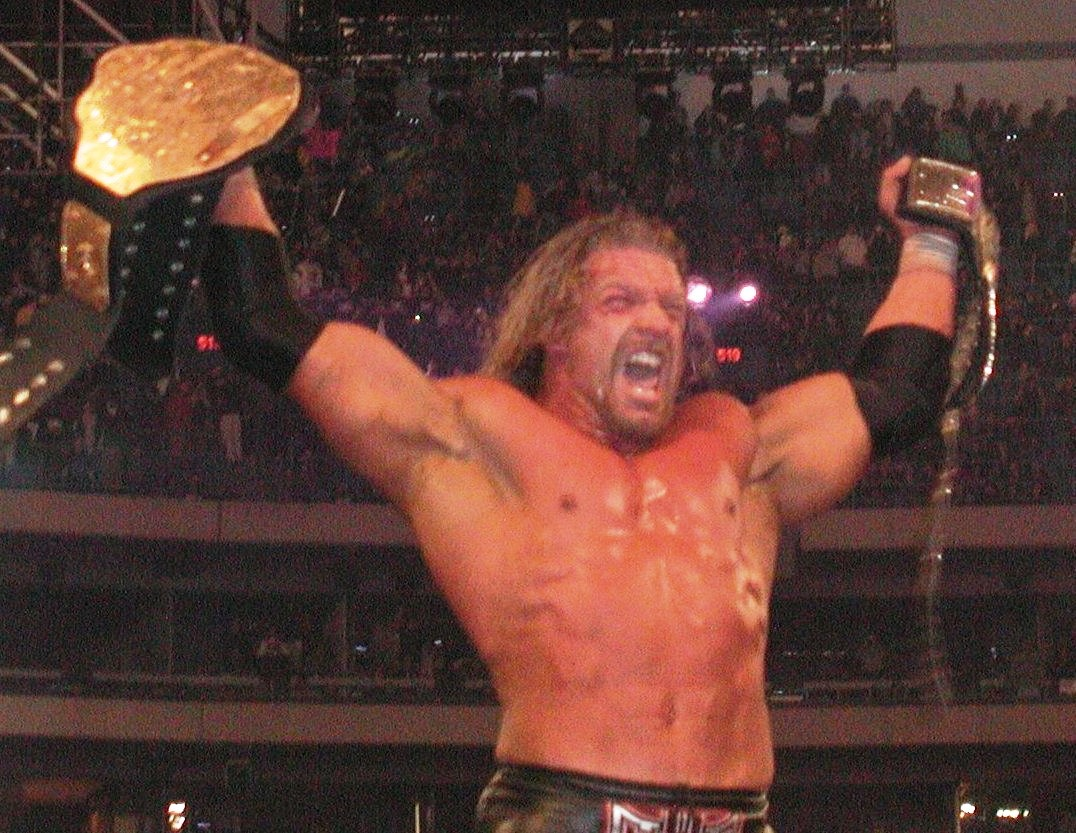
Triple H holding the former WCW Championship (left) and WWF Championship (right) as the Undisputed WWF Champion

- The WCW (World Heavyweight) Championship (rebranded as World Championship) and the WWF Championship were unified to create the Undisputed WWF Championship on December 9, 2001 at Vengeance when Chris Jericho defeated both WWF Champion Stone Cold Steve Austin and World Champion The Rock in the same night. The WWF Championship then became the Undisputed WWF Championship while the former WCW Championship was retired, although the championship belts used to represent the two championships would adorn the Undisputed WWF Champion for several months afterwards, up until a single championship belt was introduced to Triple H in April 2002. After the World Wrestling Federation (WWF) was renamed to World Wrestling Entertainment (WWE) and after the introduction of the brand split, where the promotion divided its roster into two brands where wrestlers exclusively performed, the championship was renamed as the WWE Championship in September 2002 when it became exclusive to the SmackDown! brand, resulting in the Raw brand introducing their own World Heavyweight Championship (using a replica of the original WCW World Championship) as a counterpart.
- The WWE European Championship was unified with the WWE Intercontinental Championship in July 2002, when Intercontinental Champion Rob Van Dam defeated European Champion Jeff Hardy on Raw in a title unification match. The European title was then retired.
- The WWE Hardcore Championship was unified with the WWE Intercontinental Championship in August 2002, when Intercontinental Champion Rob Van Dam pinned Hardcore Champion Tommy Dreamer. The Hardcore Championship was then retired.
- The WWE Intercontinental Championship was unified with the original World Heavyweight Championship at No Mercy when World Heavyweight Champion Triple H defeated Intercontinental Champion Kane. The Intercontinental Championship was immediately deactivated, but was later revived in May 2003 by Raw Co-General Manager Stone Cold Steve Austin.
- The WWA World Heavyweight Championship was unified with the NWA World Heavyweight Championship when NWA World Heavyweight Champion Jeff Jarrett defeated WWA World Heavyweight Champion Sting on May 25, 2003, in Auckland, New Zealand in an inter-promotional match.
- The ROH Pure Championship was unified with the ROH World Championship when World Champion Bryan Danielson defeated Pure Champion Nigel McGuinness in Liverpool, England, on August 12, 2006 in a match contested under pure wrestling rules with the stipulation that both championships could be lost via disqualification or countout. The Pure Championship was later revived in 2020.
- The International Wrestling Association unified the IWA World Heavyweight Championship with the WWC Universal Heavyweight Championship when the World Wrestling Council's champion abandoned the company and participated in a unification match which was recognized by the National Wrestling Alliance, in the process creating the first Undisputed World Heavyweight Champion in Puerto Rico.
- The Inoki Genome Federation version of the IWGP Heavyweight Championship was unified with the New Japan Pro-Wrestling's version of the IWGP Heavyweight Championship when NJPW's IWGP Heavyweight Champion Shinsuke Nakamura defeated IGF's IWGP Heavyweight Champion Kurt Angle in Tokyo on February 17, 2008. The titles were then unified due to a working agreement between Total Nonstop Action Wrestling (TNA) and New Japan Pro Wrestling in which Angle wrestled for TNA.
- The original World Tag Team Championship and original WWE Tag Team Championship were unified as the Unified WWE Tag Team Championship in a dark match before WrestleMania XXV, when WWE Tag Team Champions The Colóns (Carlito and Primo) defeated World Tag Team Champions John Morrison and The Miz in Houston, Texas on April 5, 2009 to become the Unified WWE Tag Team Champions. Both titles, however, would remain independently active but defended together until the World Tag Team Championship was formally retired in August 2010 in favor of continuing the WWE Tag Team Championship, which dropped the "unified" moniker (the WWE Tag Team Championship was renamed as the RAW Tag Team Championship in 2016 and later, as the World Tag Team Championship in 2024).
- The original WWE Women's Championship was unified with the WWE Divas Championship at the Night of Champions pay-per-view in September 2010. Divas Champion Melina faced self-professed co-WWE Women's Champion Michelle McCool in a lumberjill match. McCool won the match due to interference from real Women's Champion Layla to unify the two titles. Following the win, the Women's Championship was retired after 54 years and the Divas Championship became briefly known as the "Unified WWE Divas Championship".

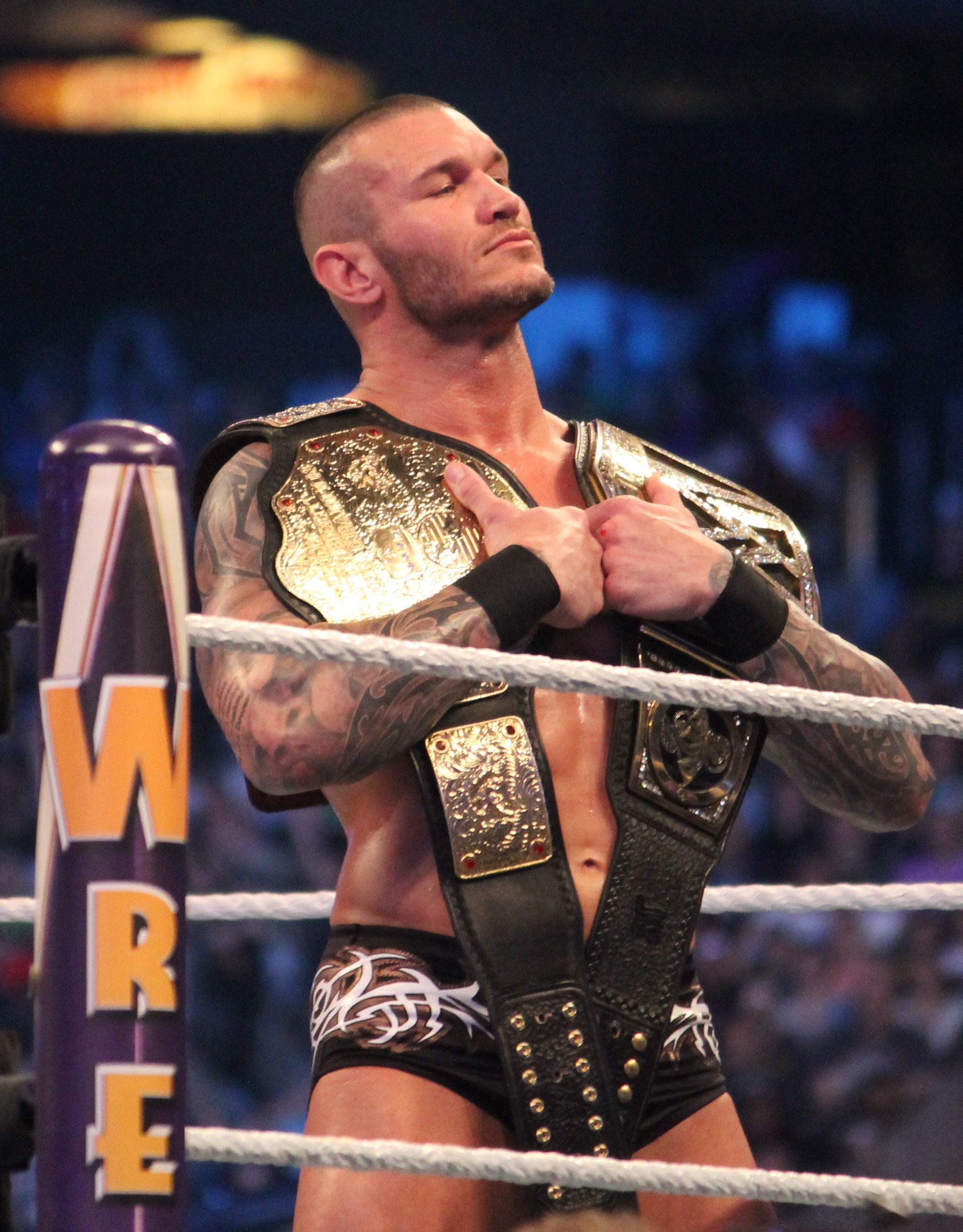
Randy Orton unified the World Heavyweight Championship (left) and WWE Championship (right) as the WWE World Heavyweight Championship.

- The original World Heavyweight Championship and WWE Championship were unified as the WWE World Heavyweight Championship at TLC: Tables, Ladders & Chairs in December 2013—two years after the end of the first brand split. WWE Champion Randy Orton defeated World Heavyweight Champion John Cena in a Tables, Ladders, and Chairs match to unify both championships. The WWE Championship subsequently became known as the WWE World Heavyweight Champion while the World Heavyweight Championship was retired, although the championship belts used to represent the two championships would adorn the WWE World Heavyweight Champion for several months afterwards, up until a single championship belt was introduced to Brock Lesnar in August 2014 on the Raw after SummerSlam. The WWE World Heavyweight Championship reverted to being called the WWE Championship (and for a brief time, the WWE World Championship) in mid-2016 after the promotion reintroduced the brand split and the title became exclusive to SmackDown, resulting in Raw establishing the WWE Universal Championship as a counterpart.
- The GFW Global Championship was unified with the Impact Wrestling World Heavyweight Championship (former TNA World Heavyweight Championship) to create the Unified GFW World Heavyweight Championship at Slammiversary XV in July 2017. GFW Global Champion Alberto El Patron defeated Impact Wrestling World Heavyweight Champion Lashley to unify both championships and become the Unified World Heavyweight Champion. The new championship retained the lineage of the TNA/Impact Wrestling World Heavyweight Championship and the GFW Global Championship was retired, although the championship belts used to represent the two championships would adorn the Unified GFW World Heavyweight Champion until a single belt was eventually produced, and the championship was eventually renamed to Impact World Championship in 2018.
- The GFW Women's Championship was unified with the Impact Wrestling Knockouts Championship (former TNA Knockouts Championship) to create the Unified GFW Knockouts Championship at Slammiversary XV in July 2017. GFW Women's Champion Sienna defeated Impact Wrestling Knockouts Champion Rosemary to unify both championships. The new championship retained the lineage of the TNA/Impact Wrestling Knockouts Championship and the GFW Women's Championship was retired.
- The IWGP Heavyweight Championship and IWGP Intercontinental Championship were unified on March 1, 2021, to create the IWGP World Heavyweight Championship, a new championship that originally did not retain the lineage of either former title. At Wrestle Kingdom 14 in January 2020, both titles were won in a Double Gold Dash match. They remained independently active but were defended together over the next year. Kota Ibushi then won both championships at Wrestle Kingdom 15 in January 2021. While Ibushi was initially recognized as the unified champion on March 1, he requested an official title unification match to be held on March 4 at New Japan Pro-Wrestling's 49th Anniversary Show, where Ibushi defeated El Desperado to officially become the inaugural IWGP World Heavyweight Champion. On January 4, 2026, at Wrestle Kingdom 20, Yota Tsuji defeated Konosuke Takeshita for the IWGP World Heavyweight Championship and then the next day at New Year Dash!!, Tsuji restored the IWGP Heavyweight Championship, with all IWGP World Heavyweight Champions recognized as IWGP Heavyweight Champions and IWGP Intercontinental Champions as a result. The IWGP Intercontinental Championship would be officially retired in the process of the IWGP Heavyweight Championship's restoration.
- The TNA World Heavyweight Championship and Impact World Championship were unified as the Impact Unified World Championship at Sacrifice on March 13, 2021. The Impact World Championship was originally known as the TNA World Heavyweight Championship before the company was renamed from Total Nonstop Action Wrestling (TNA) to Impact Wrestling in 2017. As part of a storyline in April 2020, Moose began to refer to himself as the TNA World Heavyweight Champion and carried the belt that last represented the title before it became known as the Impact World Championship. Impact did not recognize this until February 2021 and officially sanctioned Moose's championship. At Sacrifice, Impact World Champion Rich Swann defeated TNA World Heavyweight Champion Moose to unify the titles. The TNA World Heavyweight Championship was deactivated while the Impact World Championship became briefly known as the Impact Unified World Championship but reverted to Impact World Championship. The unified championship was represented by both title belts until August, when the TNA belt was retired. The Impact World Championship would then become the TNA World Championship once again after Impact Wrestling reverted to its original TNA name in January 2024.
- The NXT Cruiserweight Championship was unified with the NXT North American Championship at the special New Year's Evil episode of WWE NXT 2.0 on January 4, 2022. North American Champion Carmelo Hayes defeated Cruiserweight Champion Roderick Strong to unify the titles. The Cruiserweight Championship was then retired with Hayes as the final champion.
- The WWE Universal Championship and WWE Championship were unified as the Undisputed WWE Universal Championship at WrestleMania 38 Night 2 on April 3, 2022. Universal Champion Roman Reigns defeated WWE Champion Brock Lesnar in a Winner Takes All match to unify the titles and become the Undisputed WWE Universal Champion. Even though the match was billed as a unification match, both championship lineages remained independently active and the two championship belts would adorn the Undisputed WWE Universal Champion until a single championship belt was introduced to Reigns on the June 2, 2023 episode of SmackDown. Although the Undisputed WWE Universal Championship became represented by a single belt, both championship lineages remained independently active until WrestleMania XL Night 2 on April 7, 2024. That night, Reigns lost the Undisputed WWE Universal Championship to Cody Rhodes, after which, the title was truncated to Undisputed WWE Championship. WWE's website had listed Rhodes as both the WWE Champion and Universal Champion until he lost the title to John Cena at WrestleMania 41 the following year. The official title history was then amended, removing Rhodes as a former Universal Champion and officially retiring the title at WrestleMania XL with Reigns recognized as its final holder, with the Undisputed WWE Championship only following the lineage of the WWE Championship since WrestleMania XL (which was reportedly the original plan).
- The Raw Tag Team Championship and WWE SmackDown Tag Team Championship were unified as the Undisputed WWE Tag Team Championship on the May 20, 2022 episode of WWE SmackDown. SmackDown Tag Team Champions The Usos (Jey Uso and Jimmy Uso) defeated RAW Tag Team Champions RK-Bro (Randy Orton and Riddle) in a Winners Take All match to unify the titles and become the Undisputed WWE Tag Team Champions. Even though the match was billed as a unification match, both championships remained independently active although the championship belts used to represent the two championships would adorn the Undisputed WWE Tag Team Champions. At WrestleMania XL, both championships that made up the Undisputed WWE Tag Team Championship were split up as a result of a ladder match where both sets of tag team titles were hanging above the ring and were retrieved by two different teams, with Awesome Truth (The Miz and R-Truth) winning the RAW Tag Team Championship and A-Town Down Under (Austin Theory and Grayson Waller) winning the SmackDown Tag Team Championship. A few weeks later, the RAW Tag Team Championship was renamed as the World Tag Team Championship and the SmackDown Tag Team Championship was renamed as the WWE Tag Team Championship.
- The NXT United Kingdom Championship was unified with the NXT Championship at Worlds Collide on September 4, 2022. NXT Champion Bron Breakker defeated NXT United Kingdom Champion Tyler Bate to unify the titles and become the unified NXT Champion. The NXT United Kingdom Championship was then retired with Bate recognized as the final champion.
- The NXT UK Women's Championship was unified with the NXT Women's Championship at Worlds Collide on September 4, 2022. NXT Women's Champion Mandy Rose defeated NXT UK Women's Champion Meiko Satomura and Blair Davenport in a triple threat match to unify the titles and become the unified NXT Women's Champion. The NXT UK Women's Championship was then retired with Satomura recognized as the final champion.
- The NXT UK Tag Team Championship was unified with the NXT Tag Team Championship at Worlds Collide on September 4, 2022. Pretty Deadly (Elton Prince and Kit Wilson) defeated NXT Tag Team Champions Creed Brothers (Brutus Creed and Julius Creed), NXT UK Tag Team Champions Brooks Jensen and Josh Briggs, and Gallus (Mark Coffey and Wolfgang) in a fatal four-way tag team elimination match to unify the titles and become the unified NXT Tag Team Champions. The NXT UK Tag Team Championship was then retired with Jensen and Briggs recognized as the final champions.
- The NXT Women's Tag Team Championship was unified with the WWE Women's Tag Team Championship on the June 23, 2023 episode of SmackDown. WWE Women's Tag Team Champions Ronda Rousey and Shayna Baszler defeated NXT Women's Tag Team Champions Alba Fyre and Isla Dawn to unify the titles and become the unified WWE Women's Tag Team Champions. The NXT Women's Tag Team Championship was then retired with Fyre and Dawn recognized as the final champions.
- The NWA World Women's Television Championship was unified with the NWA World Television Championship, its male counterpart, at NWA's Paranoia event on January 13, 2024, which later aired on an episode of NWA Powerrr on February 13, 2024. NWA World Women's Television Champion Max the Impaler defeated NWA World Television Champion Mims to unify the men's and women's Television titles. This match was possible due to Max the Impaler identifying as non-binary and was allowed to face Mims. However, the unification of the titles would end at NWA Back to the Territories when Max the Impaler vacated the women's Television title as part of NWA's "Lucky Seven Rule" to challenge for the NWA World Women's Championship and would later lose the men's Television title as well.
- The AEW World Trios Championship was unified with the ROH World Six-Man Tag Team Championship on April 21, 2024, at Dynasty: Zero Hour. ROH World Six-Man Tag Team Champions Bullet Club Gold (Jay White, Austin Gunn, and Colton Gunn) defeated AEW World Trios Champions The Acclaimed (Max Caster, Anthony Bowens, and Billy Gunn) in a Winners Take All match to unify the titles as the AEW Unified World Trios Championship. Even though the match was billed as a unification match, both championships remained independently active although the championship belts used to represent the two championships would adorn the AEW Unified World Trios Champions. However, on July 10, 2024, Bullet Club Gold, now going by the name Bang Bang Gang, were stripped of both sets of titles due to an injury suffered by Jay White, thus ending the unification of the championships.
- In January 2025, Game Changer Wrestling's Ultraviolent Championship and Extreme Championship were unified when Matt Tremont won both of the championships, retiring the latter.
- The AEW International Championship and the AEW Continental Championship were unified into the AEW Unified Championship at All In on July 12, 2025. Continental Champion Kazuchika Okada defeated International Champion Kenny Omega in a Winner Takes All match to unify the titles and become the inaugural Unified Champion. However, both the International and Continental titles remain independently active with the Unified Championship representing both titles, despite the Unified title having its own lineage. It was later explained the a wrestler would only be the Unified Champion by holding both the International and Continental titles simultaneously. On December 27, 2025, the unification of the championships would end when Okada, in the finals of the 2025 Continental Classic at AEW Worlds End, lost both the tournament and the Continental Championship to Jon Moxley, with the Unified Championship being vacated and rendered inactive as a result.
- The WWE Women's Speed Championship was unified with the NXT Women's North American Championship at NXT Heatwave on August 30, 2026. NXT Women's North American Champion Zaria defeated WWE Women's Speed Champion Wren Sinclair and Kali Armstrong in a Winner Takes All Triple Threat match to unify the titles. The Women's Speed Championship was retired as a result with Sinclair recognized as the final champion.

== See also ==
- Grand Slam (professional wrestling) – Professional wrestling accomplishment
- List of early world heavyweight champions in professional wrestling
- Triple Crown (professional wrestling) – Professional wrestling accomplishment
- Undisputed championship
