= Living Dangerously (2000) =

2000 Extreme Championship Wrestling pay-per-view event

- Promotion: Extreme Championship Wrestling
- Date: March 12, 2000
- City: Danbury, Connecticut
- Venue: O'Neill Center
- Attendance: 5,000
- Buy rate: 70,000

Pay-per-view chronology
← Previous; Guilty as Charged	Next → Hardcore Heaven

Living Dangerously chronology
← Previous; 1999	Next → Final

Living Dangerously (2000) was the third and final Living Dangerously professional wrestling pay-per-view (PPV) event produced by Extreme Championship Wrestling (ECW). It took place on March 12, 2000 from the O'Neill Center in Danbury, Connecticut. The commentator for the event was Joey Styles.

The main event was a tournament final match for the vacant World Television Championship, which had been vacated by previous champion Rob Van Dam due to an injury. Super Crazy defeated Rhino to win the vacant World Television Championship. On the undercard, Mike Awesome retained the World Heavyweight Championship against Kid Kash and The Impact Players (Lance Storm and Justin Credible) won a Three-Way Dance match to win the World Tag Team Championship.

== Event ==
Before the event aired live on pay-per-view, Mikey Whipwreck defeated Pitbull #1 in a non-televised match.

=== Preliminary matches ===
The event kicked off with Steve Corino insulting The Sandman's wife Lori Fullington, prompting Sandman to come to the ring to fight Corino but The Network attacked Sandman and Lori until Dusty Rhodes made the save and it led to a Texas Bullrope match against Corino. Rhodes hit Corino with a chair and delivered an elbow drop to win the match.

Next, Danny Doring and Roadkill competed against The New Dangerous Alliance (C. W. Anderson and Bill Wiles). Roadkill was about to hit an Amish Splash on Wiles but Elektra turned on Roadkill as she crotched him on the top rope. Lou E. Dangerously hit Doring with his cell phone and Anderson nailed an Anderson Spinebuster to Doring for the win.

Next, Kid Kash was scheduled to compete against Simon Diamond (w/ Mitch & "The Prodigy" Tom Marquez). However, Mike Awesome came out threatening violence. This chased Diamond away from the ring while Kash attacked Awesome from behind to begin a match between Awesome and Kash for the World Heavyweight Championship. Awesome delivered an Awesome Bomb to Kash through the table to retain the title. After the match, Jazz checked on Kash until Diamond ordered Jado and Gedo to attack her. Nova and Chris Chetti made the save and this led to them competing against Jado and Gedo. Nova and Chetti hit a Tidal Wave to Gedo for the win.

Rhino advanced to the final of the World Television Championship tournament as The Sandman was unable to compete due to being attacked earlier in the show and taking his wife to the hospital. Super Crazy competed against Little Guido in the only semi-final death match. Sal E. Graziano interfered in the match but Crazy removed him by hitting a hurricanrana. Crazy followed by powerbombing Guido onto a table and followed with a springboard moonsault to win the match and advance to the final round.

Next, Balls Mahoney took on Kintaro Kanemura. Mahoney delivered a Nutcracker Suite to Kanemura on a steel chair for the win. After the match, Da Baldies attacked Mahoney until New Jack made the save and attacked Da Baldies with various weapons, leading to a match between Jack and Baldies member Vic Grimes. The action spilled to the ringside and they brawled with each other throughout the arena. The two then climbed the top of a steel structure and, in one of the most dangerous spots in the history of ECW, fell off it onto two tables. Grimes landed hard on Jack's head, which gave Jack a wound in the forehead, brain damage, a skull fracture and permanent blindness in his right eye.

The penultimate match was a three-way dance, in which Mike Awesome and Raven defended the World Tag Team Championship against Tommy Dreamer and Masato Tanaka and Impact Players (Lance Storm and Justin Credible). Tanaka nailed a Roaring Elbow to Awesome for the first elimination. The action then continued between the remaining two teams. The Impact Players delivered a Deep Impact to Dreamer to win the titles.

=== Main event match ===
The main event was a tournament final for the vacant World Television Championship between Super Crazy and Rhino. The referee was knocked out when Rhino pulled the referee in front of Crazy's moonsault. Yoshihiro Tajiri interfered in the match by spitting mist into Crazy's eyes. Rhino and Tajiri double teamed Crazy until Rob Van Dam, Scotty Anton and Bill Alfonso made the save. The injured RVD broke a crutch on Rhino's back while Anton attacked Tajiri. RVD drove Rhino through a table with a flapjack and Crazy hit a moonsault on Rhino to win the vacant title. After the match, The Network attacked Crazy, RVD and Anton until The Sandman made the save by clearing Network.

== Reception ==
According to Bob Colling of Wrestling Recaps, "this show consists of several matches that were decent but nothing stands out as great or really all that good. You can certainly skip this pay per view as you wouldn’t be missing much."

Scott Keith of 411Mania wrote "Can’t go any higher than thumbs down for this one, given the lack of payoff, entertaining matches, good booking or common sense, despite the usual hard work from the participants."

Nick Sellers of 411Mania wrote "There's good, there's average and there's absolute idiocy on this show. The ECW vs TNN stuff was actually done well, but apart from the TV title stuff the rest of it fell a bit flat by comparison. And then there's THAT New Jack/Grimes scaffold dive, which was reprehensible. Apart from those, and the midcard starting to get formulaic, there's still that intangible ECW fun factor attached to the show and the crowd is hot throughout, and those two elements alone always make their shows easy viewing. Call it somewhere in the middle."

== Results ==
No.	Results	Stipulations	Times
1^{D}	Mikey Whipwreck defeated Pitbull #1	Singles match	—
2	Dusty Rhodes defeated Steve Corino (with Jack Victory)	Texas Bullrope match	10:13
3	The New Dangerous Alliance (C. W. Anderson and Bill Wiles) (with Lou E. Dangerously) defeated Danny Doring and Roadkill (with Elektra)	Tag team match	7:23
4	Mike Awesome (c) (with Judge Jeff Jones) defeated Kid Kash	Singles match for the ECW World Heavyweight Championship	4:44
5	Nova and Chris Chetti defeated Jado and Gedo	Tag team match	7:33
6	Rhino defeated The Sandman by forfeit	ECW World Television Championship tournament semi-final match	0:00
7	Super Crazy defeated Little Guido (with Sal E. Graziano)	ECW World Television Championship tournament semi-final match	7:47
8	Balls Mahoney defeated Kintaro Kanemura	Singles match	1:58
9	New Jack vs. Vic Grimes (with DeVito and Angel) ended in a no contest	Singles match	—
10	Impact Players (Lance Storm and Justin Credible) (with Jason Knight and Dawn Marie) defeated Raven and Mike Awesome (c) (with Francine), and Tommy Dreamer and Masato Tanaka	Three-Way Dance for the ECW World Tag Team Championship	9:06
11	Super Crazy defeated Rhino (with Steve Corino, Jack Victory and Cyrus)	Tournament final for the vacant ECW World Television Championship	7:56
(c) / – the champion(s) heading into the match; D / – this was a dark match

=== Tournament brackets ===
Quarterfinals
Rhino	Pin
Spike Dudley	ECW on TNN (3/10)
The Sandman	Pin
Yoshihiro Tajiri	ECW Hardcore TV (3/11)
Little Guido	Pin
Kid Kash	ECW Hardcore TV (3/11)
Super Crazy	Pin
C. W. Anderson	ECW Hardcore TV (3/11)

Semifinals
Rhino	Forfeit
The Sandman	Living Dangerously
Little Guido	Living Dangerously
Super Crazy	Pin

Finals
Rhino	Living Dangerously
Super Crazy	Pin

=== Three-Way Dance eliminations ===
Elimination no.	Wrestler	Team	Eliminated by	Elimination move	Time
1	Mike Awesome	Mike Awesome and Raven	Masato Tanaka	Roaring Elbow	4:32
2	Tommy Dreamer	Masato Tanaka and Tommy Dreamer	Lance Storm	Deep Impact	9:06
Winners:	Impact Players				
