= Living Dangerously (1999) =

1999 Extreme Championship Wrestling pay-per-view event

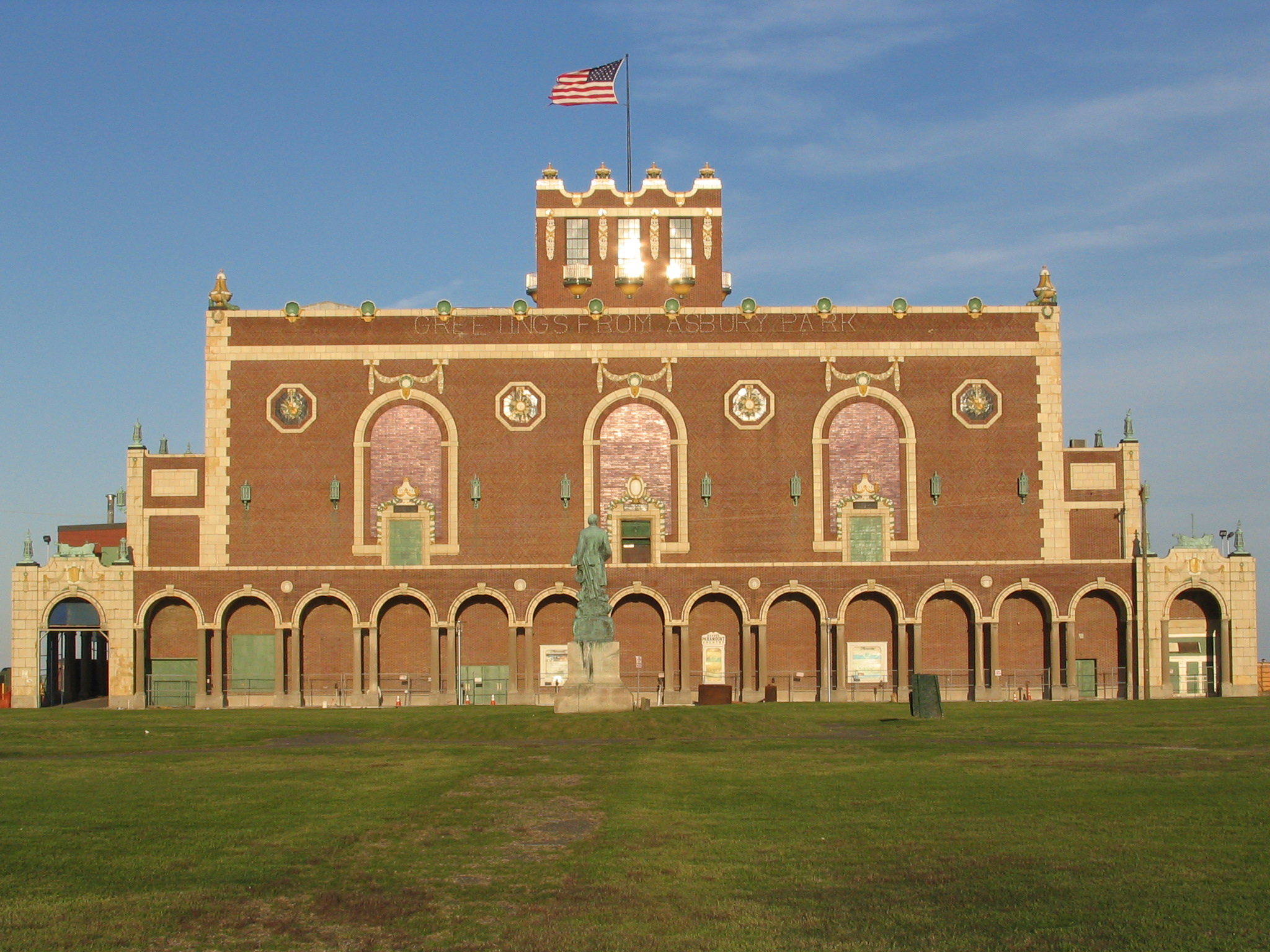
- The Asbury Park Convention Hall.
- Promotion: Extreme Championship Wrestling
- Date: March 21, 1999
- City: Asbury Park, New Jersey
- Venue: Asbury Park Convention Hall
- Attendance: 3,900
- Buy rate: 80,000

Pay-per-view chronology
← Previous; Guilty as Charged	Next → Hardcore Heaven

Living Dangerously chronology
← Previous; 1998	Next → 2000

Living Dangerously (1999) was the second Living Dangerously professional wrestling pay-per-view (PPV) event produced by Extreme Championship Wrestling (ECW). It took place on March 21, 1999, from the Asbury Park Convention Hall in Asbury Park, New Jersey.

== Event ==
Before the event aired live on pay-per-view, Nova and Chris Chetti defeated Danny Doring and Roadkill in a non-televised match.

=== Preliminary matches ===
The event kicked off with a match between Super Crazy and Yoshihiro Tajiri in a rematch from Crossing the Line '99 the prior month. Tajiri attempted to reverse a powerbomb attempt by Crazy into a hurricanrana but Crazy rolled through with a roll-up for the win.

After the match, Steve Corino cut a promo in which he praised himself, insulted the crowd and issued an open challenge which was answered by Balls Mahoney. Mahoney hit Corino with a big chair shot for the quick victory.

Next, Antifaz del Norte took on Little Guido. Antifaz dived onto Guido outside the ring but Sal E. Graziano caught him and powerslammed him through a table. This allowed Guido to gain advantage as he nailed Antifaz with a Sicilian Slice and applied a Sicilian Crab for the win.

Later, Rob Van Dam defended the World Television Championship against Jerry Lynn. The match ended in a twenty-minute time limit draw and the referee decided to award the title to Lynn but Lynn demanded that he would win the title cleanly and the match resumed. RVD hit a Five-Star Frog Splash on Lynn to retain the title.

In the following match, New Jack took on Mustafa. Jack laid down Mustafa on a table and tied him to the table with an electrical tape and then climbed the balcony and dived from twenty feet onto the table to crash Mustafa down through the table. Security officials dragged both men to the ring, where Jack pinned Mustafa for the win. After the match, The Dudley Boyz (Buh Buh Ray Dudley and D-Von Dudley) attacked Jack and issued an open challenge answered by Spike Dudley and Nova. Dudley Boyz knocked out Nova with a 3D, who was then injured and taken backstage and then Sid came to replace Nova as Spike's partner. Spike delivered an Acid Drop to Buh Buh for the win. After the match, Sid powerbombed Spike and then drove him through a table with another powerbomb.

In the penultimate match, the team of Tommy Dreamer and Shane Douglas took on The Impact Players (Justin Credible and Lance Storm). Francine snatched a Singapore cane from Credible and hit a roundhouse kick to daze him enough for Douglas to nail a Pittsburgh Plunge to Credible for the win. After the match, Cyrus the Virus distracted Dreamer and Douglas and Storm hit a flying clothesline to both Dreamer and Douglas and then Credible attacked them with a cane in the ring.

=== Main event match ===
The ECW World Heavyweight Champion Taz competed against the FTW World Heavyweight Champion Sabu in an Extreme Death match to unify both the ECW and FTW titles. After a back and forth match between the two, Taz knocked out Sabu through a table with a T-Bone Tazplex and then applied a Tazmission. Bill Alfonso threw in the towel but Sabu tossed it away and refused to give up but was knocked out to the hold. As a result, Taz won the match, thus retaining the ECW World Heavyweight Championship and unifying the unofficial FTW World Heavyweight Championship into the ECW title. After the match, Taz showed respect to Sabu by shaking hands with him.

== Reception ==
According to David of Wrestling Recaps, "This show was worth finding at a time when it had the only easily accessible RVD/Jerry Lynn match." He further added "While time has lessened its value, Living Dangerously 99 is a good show nonetheless."

The Wrestling Revolution staff described it "Overall, a pretty good show from ECW, with the top matches all delivering. Just skip New Jack vs. Mustafa and you will definitely have a good time watching this show."

Scott Keith of 411Mania gave negative reviews on Living Dangerously, stating "Everything was by the numbers, with no surprises and a couple of crap filler matches that WCW would get crucified for including." He further wrote "Not as bad as Wrestlepalooza, but still pretty bad. Thumbs way down."

Mike Whaley of the SLAM! Sports section of Canadian Online Explorer gave it a score rating of 9 out of 10, writing "ECW once again showed why it is the greatest wrestling around today, even if the March Madness fans don't realize it, at their Living Dangerously pay per view." He further wrote "Solid from top to bottom. Even the matches that weren't special had humor to cover it."

Chris Gramlich of SLAM! Sports also gave positive reviews to the event as he wrote "Once one accepts that constant perfection is an unattainable goal, logically it comes down to batting average and ECW once again comes through with a very strong outing with Living Dangerously 99'. While not quite as good as January's "Guilty as Charged" offering, Living Dangerously was a consistent effort amid rumors of imminent departures, financial trouble and as always the general instability which permeates the air of any ECW endeavor."

== Results ==
No.	Results	Stipulations	Times
1^{D}	Nova and Chris Chetti defeated Danny Doring and Amish Roadkill	Tag team match	—
2	Super Crazy defeated Yoshihiro Tajiri	Singles match	9:55
3	Balls Mahoney (with Axl Rotten) defeated Steve Corino	Singles match	3:56
4	Little Guido (with Sal E. Graziano) defeated Antifaz del Norte via submission	Singles match	5:37
5	Rob Van Dam (c) (with Bill Alfonso) defeated Jerry Lynn	Singles match for the ECW World Television Championship	22:18
6	New Jack defeated Mustafa	Singles match	9:27
7	Spike Dudley and Sid Vicious defeated The Dudley Boyz (Buh Buh Ray and D-Von) (with Joel Gertner and Sign Guy Dudley)	Tag team match	11:00
8	Tommy Dreamer and Shane Douglas (with Francine) defeated Impact Players (Justin Credible and Lance Storm) (with Jazz, Jason Knight and Dawn Marie)	Tag team match	18:58
9	Taz (ECW) defeated Sabu (FTW) (with Bill Alfonso)	Extreme Death match to unify the ECW and FTW World Heavyweight Championships	18:28
(c) / – the champion(s) heading into the match; D / – this was a dark match
