= FTW Championship =

Former professional wrestling championship

- The second and final belt design of the FTW Championship. (1998-1999, 2020-2024)

Details
- Promotion: Extreme Championship Wrestling (1998–1999); All Elite Wrestling (2020–2024)
- Date established: May 14, 1998
- Date retired: September 25, 2024

Other names
- FTW Heavyweight Championship (1998–1999); FTW Championship (2020–2024)
Statistics
- First champion: Taz
- Final champion: Hook
- Most reigns: Hook (3 reigns)
- Longest reign: Ricky Starks (378 days)
- Shortest reign: Taz (2nd reign, <1 day)
- Oldest champion: Chris Jericho (53 years, 164 days)
- Youngest champion: Hook (23 years, 84 days)
- Heaviest champion: Brian Cage (268 lb (122 kg))
- Lightest champion: Jack Perry (167 lb (76 kg))

The FTW ("Fuck The World") Championship was a professional wrestling championship. It was presented as an "outlaw" or "renegade" title that was unsanctioned by officials in-storyline, and often served as a hardcore championship, as many matches for the title were held under "FTW Rules". It was used in Extreme Championship Wrestling (ECW) from 1998 to 1999 and in All Elite Wrestling (AEW) from 2020 to 2024. The title was originally established in the now defunct ECW promotion in 1998 by its inaugural holder, Taz, which upon its introduction in AEW in 2020 made it the oldest championship in AEW until the title's retirement.

It was originally unified into the ECW World Heavyweight Championship when then ECW World Heavyweight Champion Taz won the title from Sabu at Living Dangerously 1999. It remained inactive for 21 years but the title was never actually property of ECW but of Taz himself. As such, the title was not included in the intellectual property sold to WWE during the sale of ECW in 2001, allowing Taz to reintroduce the title in AEW in 2020, this time awarding it to his client, Brian Cage. It was introduced in a similar matter to how it was introduced in ECW; the world champion of the promotion was inactive at the time, and unable to defend it, thus the FTW Championship was awarded to the would-be challenger. On September 25, 2024, at Dynamite: Grand Slam, Taz's son and record three-time champion Hook retired the title following his title defense.

== History ==
=== Extreme Championship Wrestling (1998–1999) ===
"And, hey, everybody knows that there's no way a fuck from Pittsburgh can beat up a man from Brooklyn. So what I got right here, I am the world champion, and I have the proof. You can call it the Brooklyn Title or the Fuck The World Belt!"
— Taz unveiling the FTW Heavyweight Championship at It Ain't Seinfeld

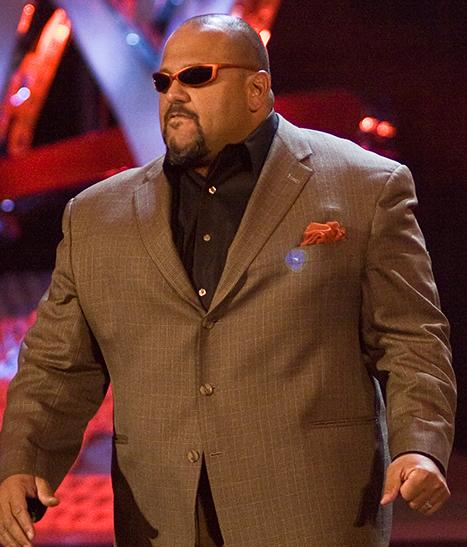
The championship's creator Taz, who held the title twice.

The FTW Heavyweight Championship was designed, created, and conceived by Taz, who also owns the rights to the title. The title was used to compensate for storylines that had to be dropped due to injuries. ECW World Heavyweight Champion Shane Douglas had a serious sinus infection and an elbow injury. Taz and Al Snow also missed their matches at Wrestlepalooza 1998 due to health problems. ECW Owner Paul Heyman said the title suited Taz's "bad-ass, no-nonsense" attitude."

Taz announced the creation of the FTW Heavyweight Championship (also referred to as the Brooklyn World Championship) on May 14, 1998, at It Ain't Seinfeld. In the storyline, he was frustrated by his inability to challenge for the ECW World Heavyweight Championship due to Champion Shane Douglas' injury and refusal to face him. Taz created and defended his own world title, billing himself as the "real" World Champion. He stated that fans appreciated the message conveyed by the title, which represented contempt for bosses and society, and said that he believed it was more appreciated than the company's top title. The championship was billed as "unrecognized" by ECW.

Taz lost the title only once, in a singles match against Sabu. This was an intentional loss, when he pulled an unconscious Sabu over himself on December 19, 1998 (he was confident that he would defeat Shane Douglas in an upcoming title bout, and thus no longer needed the FTW Heavyweight Championship). Taz regained the title at Living Dangerously on March 21, 1999, where he unified the FTW Heavyweight Championship with the ECW World Heavyweight Championship (which he then held) by defeating Sabu in a title versus title match. Taz then began using only the ECW World Heavyweight Championship, being the sole World Heavyweight Championship in the promotion, in turn retiring the FTW Heavyweight Championship.

=== All Elite Wrestling (2020–2024) ===
Taz began appearing in All Elite Wrestling (AEW) in late 2019 and officially signed with the company in January 2020 as a commentator. He then began managing Brian Cage. On Night 2 of Dynamite: Fyter Fest on July 2 that year (aired on July 8), Cage was scheduled to face Jon Moxley for the AEW World Championship; however, the match was postponed as Moxley had to self-quarantine after his wife Renee Paquette had tested positive for COVID-19. In turn, Taz reinstated the title (as the FTW Championship) that night and awarded it to Cage, mirroring the circumstances behind the title's original inception in ECW. Just like in ECW, the FTW Championship was not an officially sanctioned championship in AEW.

After winning the title at Dynasty in April 2024, due to the negative connotation of the "FTW" abbreviation, Chris Jericho, under his gimmick of a delusional mentor "The Learning Tree", rechristened "FTW" as "For The World" and declared that the title was for all the fans. The “FTW” abbreviation went back to its original meaning after Jericho lost the title to Hook. On September 25 at Dynamite: Grand Slam, Hook retired the FTW Championship after his title defense and returned the title to his father, Taz.

== Belt designs ==
The original FTW Heavyweight Championship belt (introduced on May 14, 1998)

When the title was first created, the FTW belt was a custom ECW Television Championship belt with a leather strap painted orange, stickers partially covering the belt, and a "TAZ" logo at the top. "FTW" stickers were strategically placed over the word "Television" in the middle of the belt as well as the United States and United Kingdom flags on the side plates. A few months later, in an attempt to persuade Taz to team with Sabu and Rob Van Dam against Shane Douglas and The Triple Threat, Bill Alfonso presented Taz with an original FTW belt featuring a black leather strap and orange-accented bronze plates, with a "TAZ" logo engraved in the belt's centerplate. This second design would also be used for the belt after its reintroduction in AEW. Taz stated that the concept and attitude have been replicated by other companies.

According to Taz on The Rise and Fall of ECW DVD documentary, when Sabu won the title, he was legitimately upset backstage over Taz's name being permanently displayed on the belt. From then on, whenever Sabu had the belt with him, he would cover the Taz logo with athletic tape and write "SABU" on it in magic marker. A similar instance occurred with former FTW Champion Chris Jericho, as after winning the title, he appeared on the April 24, 2024, episode of Dynamite with a decal of his name at the top of the belt to cover Taz's name.

== Reigns ==
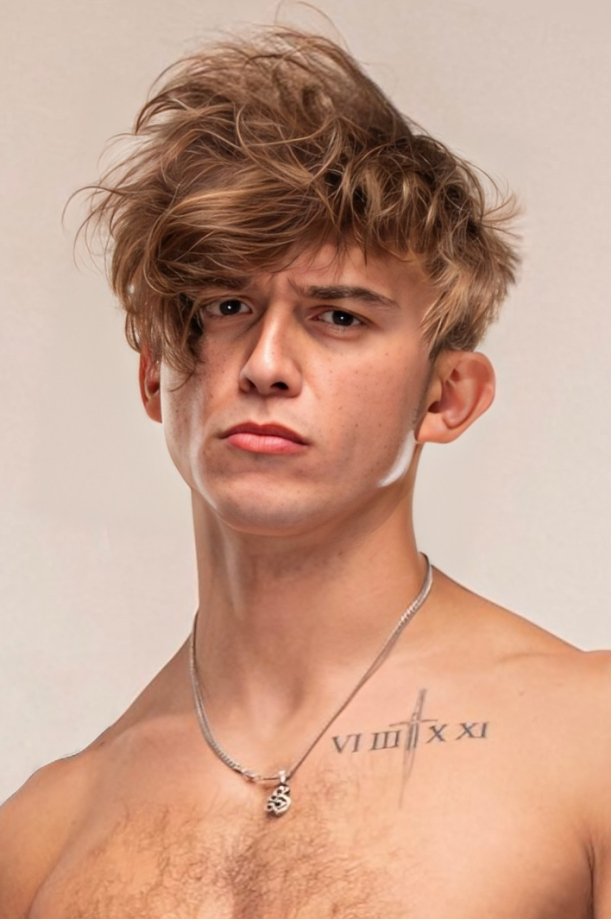
Record three-time and final champion Hook, who also had the longest combined days as champion at 626 days.

There were a total of 10 reigns between seven champions and one vacancy. Taz was the inaugural champion. His son Hook was the final champion and also had the most reigns at three, as well as the longest combined reign at 626 days. Ricky Starks had the longest singular reign at 378 days while Taz's second reign was the shortest at less than a day as he abandoned the title upon winning the ECW World Heavyweight Championship in a championship unification match. Chris Jericho was the oldest champion at 53 years old while Hook was the youngest when he first won the title at 23.

=== Names ===
Name	Years
FTW Heavyweight Championship	May 14, 1998 – March 21, 1999
FTW Championship	July 2, 2020 – September 25, 2024

Key
No.	Overall reign number
Reign	Reign number for the specific champion
Days	Number of days held
<1	Reign lasted less than a day
+	Current reign is changing daily

No.	Champion	Championship change			Reign statistics		Notes	Ref.
No.	Champion	Date	Event	Location	Reign	Days	Notes	Ref.
Extreme Championship Wrestling (ECW)
1	Taz	May 14, 1998	It Ain't Seinfeld	Queens, NY	1	219	Taz introduced the FTW Heavyweight Championship during a storyline.	
2	Sabu	December 19, 1998	Hardcore TV	Philadelphia, PA	1	92	This was a triple threat match, also involving Justin Credible. Aired on tape delay on December 23, 1998.	
3	Taz	March 21, 1999	Living Dangerously	Asbury Park, NJ	2	<1	This was an Extreme Death match which was also for Taz's ECW World Heavyweight Championship.	
—	Unified	March 21, 1999	Living Dangerously	Asbury Park, NJ	—	—	Taz unified the title with the ECW World Heavyweight Championship.	
All Elite Wrestling (AEW)
4	Brian Cage	July 2, 2020	Dynamite: Fyter Fest; Night 2	Jacksonville, FL	1	377	Taz reintroduced the title as the FTW Championship and awarded it to Cage, whom he was managing. Aired on tape delay on July 8, 2020	
5	Ricky Starks	July 14, 2021	Dynamite: Fyter Fest; Night 1	Cedar Park, TX	1	378		
6	Hook	July 27, 2022	Dynamite: Fight for the Fallen	Worcester, MA	1	357		
7	Jack Perry	July 19, 2023	Dynamite: Blood & Guts	Boston, MA	1	39		
8	Hook	August 27, 2023	All In: Zero Hour	London, England	2	238	This was an FTW Rules match.	
9	Chris Jericho	April 21, 2024	Dynasty	St. Louis, MO	1	126	This was an FTW Rules match.	
10	Hook	August 25, 2024	All In	London, England	3	31	This was an FTW Rules Last Chance match. Had Hook lost, he would have never been able to challenge for the title again for as long as Chris Jericho was champion.	
—	Deactivated	September 25, 2024	Dynamite: Grand Slam	Queens, NY	—	—	After successfully defending the title against Roderick Strong, Hook announced the retirement of the FTW Championship.	

== Combined reigns ==
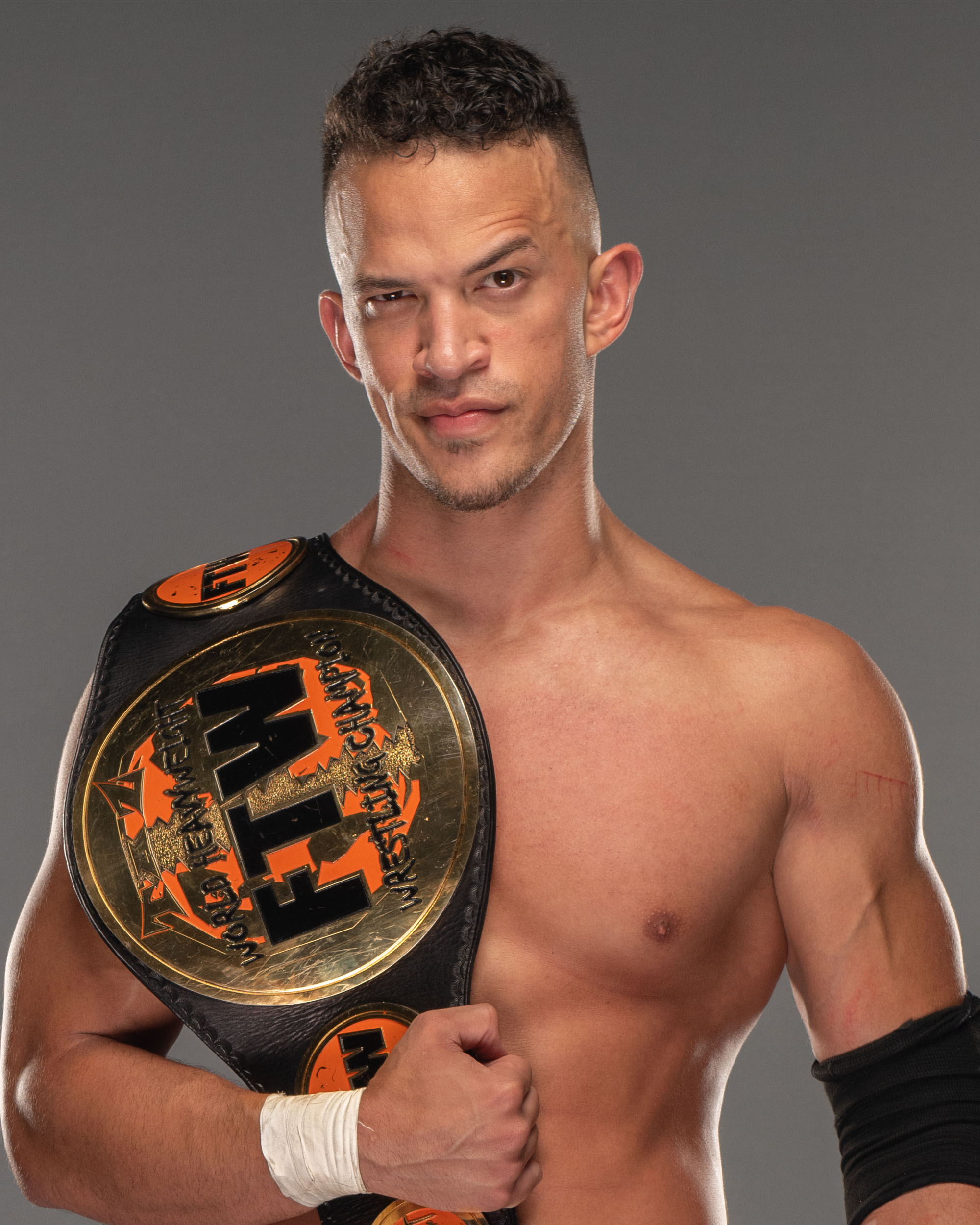
Ricky Starks, who has the longest singular reign at 378 days

Rank	Wrestler	No. of reigns	Combined days
1	Hook	3	626
2	Ricky Starks	1	378
3	Brian Cage	1	377
4	Taz	2	219
5	Chris Jericho	1	126
6	Sabu	1	92
7	Jack Perry	1	39
