= Living Dangerously (1998) =

1998 Extreme Championship Wrestling pay-per-view event

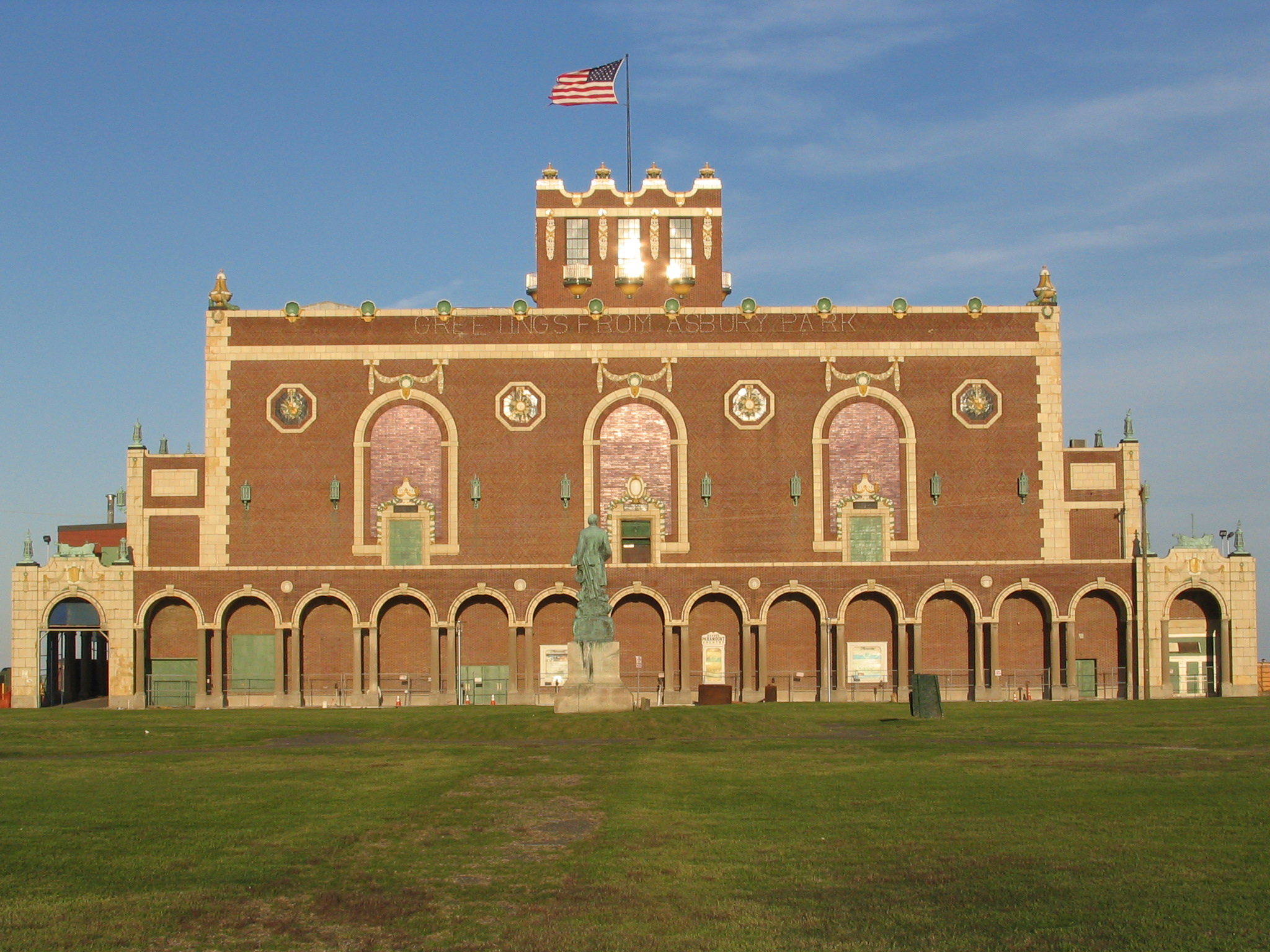
- The Asbury Park Convention Hall.
- Promotion: Extreme Championship Wrestling
- Date: March 1, 1998
- City: Asbury Park, New Jersey
- Venue: Asbury Park Convention Hall
- Attendance: 3,700
- Buy rate: 80,000

Pay-per-view chronology
← Previous; November to Remember	Next → Wrestlepalooza

Living Dangerously chronology
← Previous; First	Next → 1999

Living Dangerously (1998) was the inaugural Living Dangerously professional wrestling pay-per-view (PPV) event produced by Extreme Championship Wrestling (ECW). It took place on March 1, 1998 from the Asbury Park Convention Hall in Asbury Park, New Jersey.

== Event ==
=== Preliminary matches ===
The event kicked off with a tag team match between The Full Blooded Italians (Little Guido and Tracey Smothers) and the team of Jerry Lynn and Chris Chetti. Tommy Rich tried to hit Lynn with the Italian flag but Lynn ducked and Rich accidentally hit Smothers with it, allowing Lynn to roll-up Smothers for the win.

Next, Masato Tanaka and Yukihiro Kanemura from Frontier Martial-Arts Wrestling were scheduled to compete in a match which would mark the ECW debut of Tanaka and Kanemura until Lance Wright interrupted the match and announced that Doug Furnas would be replacing Kanemura. Tanaka hit a Roaring Elbow to Furnas for the win.

Next, 2 Cold Scorpio competed against Rob Van Dam. Scorpio knocked out the referee by accidentally hitting a splash. RVD attempted to deliver a 450° splash on Scorpio but Scorpio avoided it and hit a powerbomb. Scorpio then delivered a Scorpio Splash to RVD. Sabu interfered in the match and hit an Arabian Facebuster to Scorpio and then The Sandman chased him away. RVD pinned Scorpio with a victory roll for the win.

In the following match, The Hardcore Chair Swingin' Freaks (Balls Mahoney and Axl Rotten) competed against The Dudley Boyz (Buh Buh Ray Dudley and D-Von Dudley) and the team of New Jack and Spike Dudley in a Three-Way Dance. The Freaks and Dudley Boyz started fighting each other even before the third team entered into the match and continued to brawl until Jack and Dudley finally joined in the match and Jack arrived with a trashcan full of weapons. Dudley Boyz caused the first elimination by hitting a 3D on Mahoney. Spike and Jack hit Dudley Boyz with guitars and then Jack hit a 187 on D-Von for the win.

Later, Tommy Dreamer took on Justin Credible. Credible hit a That's Incredible on Dreamer until Beulah McGillicutty showed up at ringside and hit a low blow to Credible and a DDT to Jason. Nicole Bass applied a bearhug on Beulah and then Mikey Whipwreck made the save by hitting a Whippersnapper on Bass. Credible hit Whipwreck's injured knee with a crutch, which allowed Dreamer to hit a DDT to Credible for the win.

Next, Taz defended the World Television Championship against Bam Bam Bigelow. Bigelow attempted to nail a Greetings From Asbury Park on Taz but Taz countered it into a Tazmission. He made Bigelow submit but the referee did not see it and then Bigelow fell towards the corner of the ring and both men fell down, going through the ring. Bigelow then pinned Taz to win the title. The ring was damaged and after the match the ring crew began fixing the ring, resulting in the next scheduled match between Al Snow and John Kronus to be cancelled.

The penultimate match was a Dueling Canes match between The Sandman and Sabu. Rob Van Dam interfered in the match and then both RVD and Sabu set up Sandman on a table and knocked him with a Five-Star Frog Splash and Arabian Facebuster combination. Sabu then pinned Sandman to win the match.

=== Main event match ===
The main event was a dream partner match in which Chris Candido and Lance Storm were scheduled to choose their favourite tag team partners. Candido chose Shane Douglas while Storm did not reveal the name of his partner. Storm wrestled the early duration of the match on his own until he revealed his tag team partner to be Al Snow, who joined in the match. Snow tossed Douglas into a hole in the ring and then dragged him out of it to execute a Snow Plow for the win.

== Reception ==
In 2002, Scott Keith of Inside Pulse stated "Very low quality of wrestling on this show, which Paul E tried to compensate for by throwing everything but the kitchen sink into every match. It just becomes mind-numbingly dull after a while as he books like Dusty Rhodes on speed."

In 2011, Arnold Furious of Wrestling Recaps wrote "On the whole a solid card with only the main event being a spectacular let down but I guess with half the ring missing they did ok." According to him, the dueling canes match, the World Television Championship match and Rob Van Dam and 2 Cold Scorpio's match were the best matches of the show.

In March 2014, James Bullock of Capricorn City wrote "The brightest highlights from this event are matches featuring mostly wrestling and little nonsense. Case in point: RVD vs. Scorpio and the TV title matches are the things you’d walk away from thinking about the most. Not the rave party at the end or the over-hyped cane bout. Just when WWF and WCW were hitting their strides in the Monday Night War (ushering in the “Attitude Era” for WWF and WCW’s eventual demise), ECW (owner and booker Paul Heyman) was trying to throw everything against the wall to see what stuck instead of using smart pacing and making true moments mean something as they had done only a year prior. This is a mildly disappointing show to say the least featuring only two out of eight matches you should go out of your way to see."

== Results ==
No.	Results	Stipulations	Times
1	Jerry Lynn and Chris Chetti defeated The F.B.I. (Little Guido and Tracey Smothers) (with Tommy Rich)	Tag team match	8:19
2	Masato Tanaka defeated Doug Furnas (with Lance Wright)	Singles match	5:46
3	Rob Van Dam (with Bill Alfonso) defeated 2 Cold Scorpio	Singles match	27:10
4	New Jack and Spike Dudley defeated The Dudley Boyz (Buh Buh Ray and D-Von) (with Joel Gertner, Big Dick and Sign Guy Dudley), and The Hardcore Chair Swingin' Freaks (Balls Mahoney and Axl Rotten)	Three-Way Dance	13:25
5	Tommy Dreamer defeated Justin Credible (with Jason and Nicole Bass)	Singles match	8:58
6	Bam Bam Bigelow defeated Taz (c)	Singles match for the ECW World Television Championship	13:37
7	Sabu (with Bill Alfonso) defeated The Sandman	Dueling Canes match	9:21
8	Al Snow and Lance Storm (with Tammy Lynn Sytch) defeated Shane Douglas and Chris Candido (with Francine)	Tag team match	4:49
(c) / – the champion(s) heading into the match
