= Taz (wrestler) =

American professional wrestler, color commentator, and radio personality

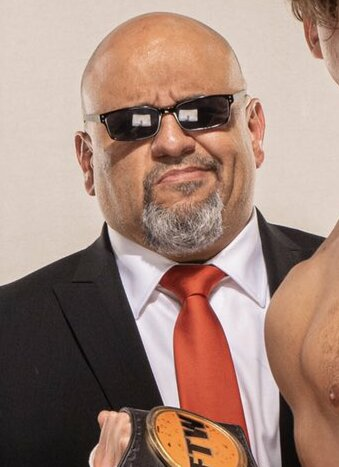
- Taz in 2022

Personal information
- Born: Peter Senerchia; October 11, 1967 (age 59) Brooklyn, New York City, U.S.
- Spouse: Teresa Smith
- Children: Hook (son)
- Family: Chris Chetti (cousin)

Professional wrestling career
- Ring name(s): Battlemaniac Taz; Kid Krush; The Tasmanian Devil; The Tazmaniac; Taz; Tazz
- Billed height: 5 ft 9 in (175 cm)
- Billed weight: 240 lb (109 kg)
- Billed from: "The Red Hook Section of Brooklyn, New York"
- Trained by: Johnny Rodz
- Debut: June 3, 1987
- Retired: June 11, 2006

Peter Senerchia (born October 11, 1967), better known by the ring name Taz (also spelled Tazz), is an American radio personality, color commentator, and retired professional wrestler signed to All Elite Wrestling (AEW) as a color commentator for AEW Dynamite and manager.

Beginning his career in 1987, Taz began his rise to prominence after joining Eastern Championship Wrestling (ECW, later Extreme Championship Wrestling) in 1993 as The Tazmaniac. In late-1995, following a severe neck injury, he shortened his ring name to "Taz" and adopted the persona of a belligerent shoot fighter who dismantled opponents with an array of suplexes before forcing them to submit with the "Tazmission". During his time in ECW, Taz was a two-time ECW World Heavyweight Champion, a two-time ECW World Television Champion, a three-time ECW World Tag Team Champion, a two-time (and the inaugural) FTW Heavyweight Champion, and the fourth ECW Triple Crown Champion.

In 1999, Taz left ECW to join the World Wrestling Federation (WWF, later WWE) where he was renamed "Tazz". After largely retiring from the ring in 2002, he transitioned into a color commentary role. Upon leaving WWE in 2009, Taz joined Total Nonstop Action Wrestling (TNA) as a color commentator. He left TNA in 2015. In 2019, Taz joined the upstart AEW promotion, where he once again provided color commentary as well as managing Team Taz, a stable that included his son Tyler “Hook” Senerchia.

== Professional wrestling career ==
=== Early career (1987–1993) ===
Senerchia began wrestling in World Wrestling Council (WWC) and made his professional wrestling debut on June 3, 1987 in San Juan, Puerto Rico, after being trained by Johnny Rodz. He wrestled as Kid Krush before moving on to the name The Tazmaniac, of which he would use variations for the rest of his career. In the early 1990s as The Tazmaniac, he wrestled for International World Class Championship Wrestling (IWCCW) and held the IWCCW Light Heavyweight Championship for six months in 1991. He would teamed with his cousin, Joe as the Tazmanaics. He would follow Tony Rumble in leaving IWCCW to join the newly established Century Wrestling Alliance (CWA).

Senerchia had his first World Wrestling Federation (WWF) match on August 19, 1991, as the Tazmaniac, when he was defeated by Ray Odyssey. In November 1992, Senerchia (as "Tazmaniac") toured Japan with New Japan Pro-Wrestling (NJPW) as part of its "Wrestling Scramble" series; his matches during the tour included a loss to Pegasus Kid in Tokyo's Ryōgoku Kokugikan. He made his only appearance ever in World Championship Wrestling (WCW) when he defeated Joey Maggs in a dark match at a WCW Saturday Night taping in Atlanta, Georgia on February 8, 1993. He would then make his second appearance in the WWF on May 5, 1993. Wrestling in a dark match at a Wrestling Challenge taping in Portland, ME, Tazmaniac would beat Scott Taylor. He would go on to make two additional appearances on house shows in New Jersey on June 29 and June 30, losing to Jim Powers on each occasion.

=== Eastern Championship Wrestling / Extreme Championship Wrestling (1993–1999) ===
==== Early years and injury (1993–1995) ====
Wrestling as "The Tazmaniac", Senerchia debuted in the Philadelphia-based promotion Eastern Championship Wrestling (ECW) in October 1993 at NWA Bloodfest. He formed a tag team with Joe Chetti (brother of Chris Chetti) called The Tazmaniacs. When that team broke up, he was put into another team with Kevin Sullivan, with whom he won the Tag Team Championship twice. During his second reign as Tag Team Champion with Sullivan, The Tazmaniac became a double champion when he also won the Television Championship for one night in March 1994. For most of the rest of the year he floated around the tag ranks, teaming with different partners. He held the title once more, this time with Sabu, until Sabu was legitimately fired by ECW owner Paul Heyman for no-showing an event in favor of touring Japan for New Japan Pro-Wrestling. In August 1994, The Tazmaniac competed in a one-night eight-man tournament for the vacant NWA World Heavyweight Championship, losing to Shane Douglas in the quarter-finals.

The Tazmaniac was put out of action by a legit injury for much of 1995. On July 20, during a tag team match 2 Cold Scorpio and Dean Malenko delivered a spike piledriver to him, and though he knew it was about to be performed, he did not have time to properly protect himself. As he explained on the DVD documentary The Rise and Fall of ECW, "I landed right on my forehead and just jacked my whole neck back and that was it." The neck injury was so bad that, according to Tommy Dreamer, hospital staff couldn't believe he'd walked into the hospital where he sought help after the match. Though he was unable to wrestle, Paul Heyman continued to pay him per their oral agreement, forging a loyalty between the men.

==== Rise to superstardom (1995–1996) ====
Following his neck injury, Taz made appearances with the Steiner Brothers, even standing in their corner during matches with The Eliminators and getting physical with Jason. It was at the November to Remember event, when Taz turned heel and joined up with referee Bill Alfonso. Working as the special referee for Alfonso's match with ECW commissioner Tod Gordon, Taz refused to count to three and assaulted Gordon, then making the count for Alfonso. In his post-match promo, he claimed that no one was looking after him while he was injured and that no one cared (though Heyman was still paying him, the kayfabe story was that he had been forgotten and that Alfonso was the one helping him keep food on his family's table). He was also angry that Sabu was brought back in that very night. He would later credit the neck injury, which caused him to spiral into a depression, with helping him develop the Taz character when booker Paul Heyman told him to turn his real life frustration into an on-screen persona.

Taz returned to the ring on December 19, 1995, at Holiday Hell with a new look and wrestling style. The new character had him clad in a black and orange singlet and exhibiting a more physically intense in-ring style, focusing his offense on mat wrestling and suplexes (inspired by working with the Steiner Brothers), which announcer Joey Styles dubbed Taz-Plexes, earning him the nickname "the Human Suplex Machine". He also debuted his Tazmission/Katahajime finishing maneuver, causing opponents to tap out to signal their submission as in mixed martial arts instead of nodding their head or vocally saying "yes". This quirk was soon picked up by other companies throughout the country. Heading into the summer, Taz began feuding with Tommy Dreamer, joining up with Brian Lee to face Dreamer and Terry Gordy and later Dreamer and "Dr. Death" Steve Williams. Taz also developed a friendship with the Eliminators, based on mutual respect, and they occasionally involved themselves in his matches. Perry Saturn and Taz were both trainers at ECW's House of Hardcore wrestling school. For a while, some of the students, including Mako and Chris Chetti, would accompany Taz and Alfonso to the ring as a faction known as Team Taz.

At November to Remember, things seemed to come full circle, as Taz stormed to the ring and interrupted Styles and "stole Paul E.'s thunder" by announcing that there would be a "big show in the first quarter of the new year", basically telling the fans in attendance that ECW's first pay-per-view was on the horizon. At that "big show", he guaranteed that Sabu would finally face him. Later that night, he came out to force Scorpio to leave the ring and went on an angry tirade, abusing Bob Artese and holding him hostage in the ring. Taz demanded Sabu come out and face him, and twice even led the crowd in a "Sabu, Sabu" chant to get him to enter the ring. Several officials and wrestlers came out and Taz eventually got his hands on Paul E. The lights went out and when they came back on, Sabu was in the ring, across from Taz. This was the first time they had been in the ring together since early 1995. Before they could lock up, the lights went out again.

During Sabu's match, where he teamed with Rob Van Dam to face the Eliminators and the Gangstas in a three-way dance, Taz attempted to attack his former partner, but Van Dam saved Sabu and was choked out in the aisle. This distraction caused Sabu to get hit with Total Elimination and his team lost. Taz also began a mini-feud with Rob Van Dam, dominating him in every match and was also out for a short time to get surgery on his injured shoulder. As 1996 ended and 1997 began, Taz and Sabu continued to try getting at one another, with no actual contact.

==== World Television Champion (1997–1998) ====
On February 24, 1997, Taz defeated Mikey Whipwreck on WWF Monday Night Raw as part of the ECW Invasion.

Early in 1997, the antagonism between Sabu and Taz was growing, as Taz attacked Sabu's partner, Rob Van Dam, costing the team matches with The Eliminators and other teams. In the months leading to ECW's first pay-per-view, Taz would choke out low-level wrestlers with the Tazmission due to viewing his matches as secondary to his rivalry with Sabu. He then dominated another series of matches with Van Dam before meeting Sabu at Barely Legal, where Taz defeated him with the Tazmission, only to have his manager Bill Alfonso turn on him and join Sabu and his partner Rob Van Dam. In response, Taz began teaming with Chris Candido to face Sabu and Van Dam.

Two months later at Wrestlepalooza, Taz lost to Sabu in the rematch, marking his first loss since 1995. However, later in the night, he won the World Television Championship from Shane Douglas to begin his second reign. He defended the title against all comers, including Douglas, Lance Storm, John Kronus, Al Snow, Jerry Lynn and Chris Candido. Throughout late 1997, Taz began feuding with The Triple Threat in addition to Sabu and Van Dam, where he sometimes teamed up with Tommy Dreamer during the feud. At November to Remember, he issued a challenge to World Heavyweight Champion Bam Bam Bigelow. The two would eventually meet, after Bigelow turned on Taz in a match against Shane Douglas and Chris Candido. Taz would ultimately lose the title to Bam Bam Bigelow at Living Dangerously on March 1, 1998.

==== World Heavyweight Champion; departure (1998–1999) ====
After losing the World Television Championship, Taz was elevated into the World Heavyweight Championship picture. In May 1998, with Shane Douglas injured and unable to wrestle, Taz was given an old World Television Championship belt painted orange—his trademark color—and began cutting promos, declaring himself the FTW Heavyweight Champion at It Ain't Seinfeld. Though the championship was unsanctioned in storyline, it was defended at ECW shows until Douglas was healthy. Just before winning the World Heavyweight Championship, Taz "gave" the FTW Heavyweight Title to long-time foe Sabu in a match where he physically pulled Sabu on top of him to allow him to get the pin.

Taz finally defeated Shane Douglas for the World Heavyweight Championship at Guilty as Charged, thus ending Douglas' year-long reign. Taz was supposed to defend the title against Chris Candido in his first televised title defense at House Party but Douglas attacked Candido before the match and took his place, whom Taz defeated to retain the title in his first successful title defense. He would then begin a feud with Sabu over Taz's World Heavyweight Championship and Sabu's FTW Heavyweight Championship. The rivalry culminated in a title unification match at the Living Dangerously pay-per-view, where Taz defeated Sabu to unify the FTW Heavyweight Championship into the World Heavyweight Championship. He would begin his next rivalry with Chris Candido, whom he defeated to retain the title at CyberSlam. The two were scheduled to a rematch at Hardcore Heaven, which Taz quickly won. However, he was attacked by Dudley Boyz after the match, leading to a title defense against Buh Buh Ray Dudley in a falls count anywhere match in the main event later that night, which Taz won to retain the title. Taz then successfully defended the title against Candido on the June 4 episode of Hardcore TV to end the rivalry.

Taz made his next successful title defense against Spike Dudley in a Falls Count Anywhere match on the June 25 episode of Hardcore TV. He would begin feuding with the members of Steve Corino's new rising stable, primarily Yoshihiro Tajiri. Taz successfully defended the World Heavyweight Championship against Tajiri at Hostile City Showdown, the Heat Wave pay-per-view and the September 3 episode of ECW on TNN. During that time, Taz signed with the World Wrestling Federation, before he losing the ECW title as the first man to be eliminated in a three-way dance by Mike Awesome and Masato Tanaka at Anarchy Rulz. This ended his eight-month reign at 252 days. As he walked out of the ring, a large portion of the ECW locker room joined him on the entrance ramp to give him an emotional sendoff. After being off of ECW television for most of the fall, he wrestled one final match as an ECW performer at November to Remember, losing to Rob Van Dam via pinfall. Taz's final televised match in ECW aired on the November 13 episode of Hardcore TV, in which he received a rematch against Mike Awesome for the World Heavyweight Championship, which he lost. In the DVD The Rise and Fall of ECW, Taz said that he signed with the WWE because he was in the top of the company and he lost his passion.

=== New Japan Pro-Wrestling (1995) ===
In January and February 1995, Senerchia returned to NJPW) as part of its "Heisei Ishingun Restoration Spirit" series, wrestling under the ring name "Battlemaniac Taz". During the tour, he primarily teamed with Masahiro Chono. His matches included teaming with Sabu in a loss to Heisei Ishingun in Tokyo's Korakuen Hall.

=== World Wrestling Federation / World Wrestling Entertainment (2000–2009) ===
==== Feud with Jerry Lawler; The Alliance (2000–2002) ====
After being contacted by the World Wrestling Federation (WWF) and World Championship Wrestling (WCW) in 1999, Senercia ultimately signed for the WWF, where he was renamed "Tazz". Beginning in December 1999, what would become Tazz's symbol would play on the Titantron during various entrances, and the arena would be shrouded in Tazz's signature orange color. Tazz made his in-ring debut in January 2000 at Madison Square Garden at the 2000 Royal Rumble as the surprise opponent of the previously undefeated Kurt Angle, who he defeated with the Tazzmission. Just a few months after Tazz arrived in the WWF, Mike Awesome, the man he had lost the ECW World Heavyweight Championship to at Anarchy Rulz, secretly signed with WCW. Legal wrangling by Paul Heyman prevented Awesome from taking the championship belt with him, and in a bizarre piece of professional wrestling history, ECW and WWF officials agreed to have Tazz, a WWF wrestler, make a surprise appearance at an ECW show to defeat Awesome, a WCW wrestler, for the ECW World Heavyweight Championship. Tazz held the title for ten days before losing it to Tommy Dreamer, during which time he wore it on various WWF shows, and including an episode of WWF SmackDown! where he lost to WWF Champion Triple H. However, Vince McMahon later expressed some regret over booking Tazz to lose to Triple H.

After he lost the ECW World Heavyweight Championship at CyberSlam, Tazz was placed into contention for the WWF Intercontinental Championship, but he never won the title. In the summer, after taking time off for an arm injury, he turned heel and placed into a feud with color commentator and semi-retired wrestler Jerry Lawler. The feud included matches at SummerSlam and Unforgiven, which they split. Tazz was only able to pick up the Unforgiven win when he received help from Raven, who had returned to the company. Afterwards, the duo formed a tag team that lasted until November.

When the Invasion angle began, Tazz acted as "the voice of The Alliance", sticking up for them and speaking on their behalf whenever possible. Over the next few weeks, he'd be beaten up by Stone Cold Steve Austin, made out as the weak link and "the example" needed to be made to the other Alliance members. Despite this mistreatment, Tazz would still speak positively about Austin and The Alliance as a whole while on commentary. He eventually left the stable after he finally stood up to Austin and attacked Paul Heyman in the weeks leading up to Survivor Series, where The Alliance lost to Team WWF.

In December 2001, Tazz began teaming with Spike Dudley. On the January 7, 2002, edition of Raw, Tazz and Dudley defeated The Dudley Boyz for the WWF Tag Team Championship, and successfully retained them at the Royal Rumble. They dropped the titles to Billy and Chuck on the Smackdown edition of February 21, 2002.

==== Color commentator and departure (2002–2009) ====
With injuries mounting, Tazz began performing part-time commentary on Sunday Night Heat in October 2000. His first pay-per-view announcement appearance was during Rebellion in December 2000, announcing alongside Jim Ross. He joined the SmackDown! team in February 2001 after Jerry Lawler quit the company, as well as becoming one of the trainers for the joint WWF/MTV produced reality series Tough Enough. Lawler returned to the company on November 19, 2001, and resumed his place as commentator, with Tazz becoming both a wrestler and a commentator.

When World Wrestling Entertainment split into two brands, Tazz was put on the WWF SmackDown! brand, where he resumed his color commentator duties. Not long after he retired from the ring in June 2002, and he became a full-time broadcaster. He co-hosted SmackDown! for World Wrestling Entertainment until a third brand, ECW, was introduced in 2006, at which point he became the color commentator for that show. He was also the co-host, with Joey Styles, of History of Extreme Championship Wrestling on WWE 24/7 Classics, a show that re-aired archived episodes of the original ECW's weekly television programs. Before and during episodes he and Styles provide insight into the storylines, inner workings, and general ambiance of ECW at the time—as they remember it.

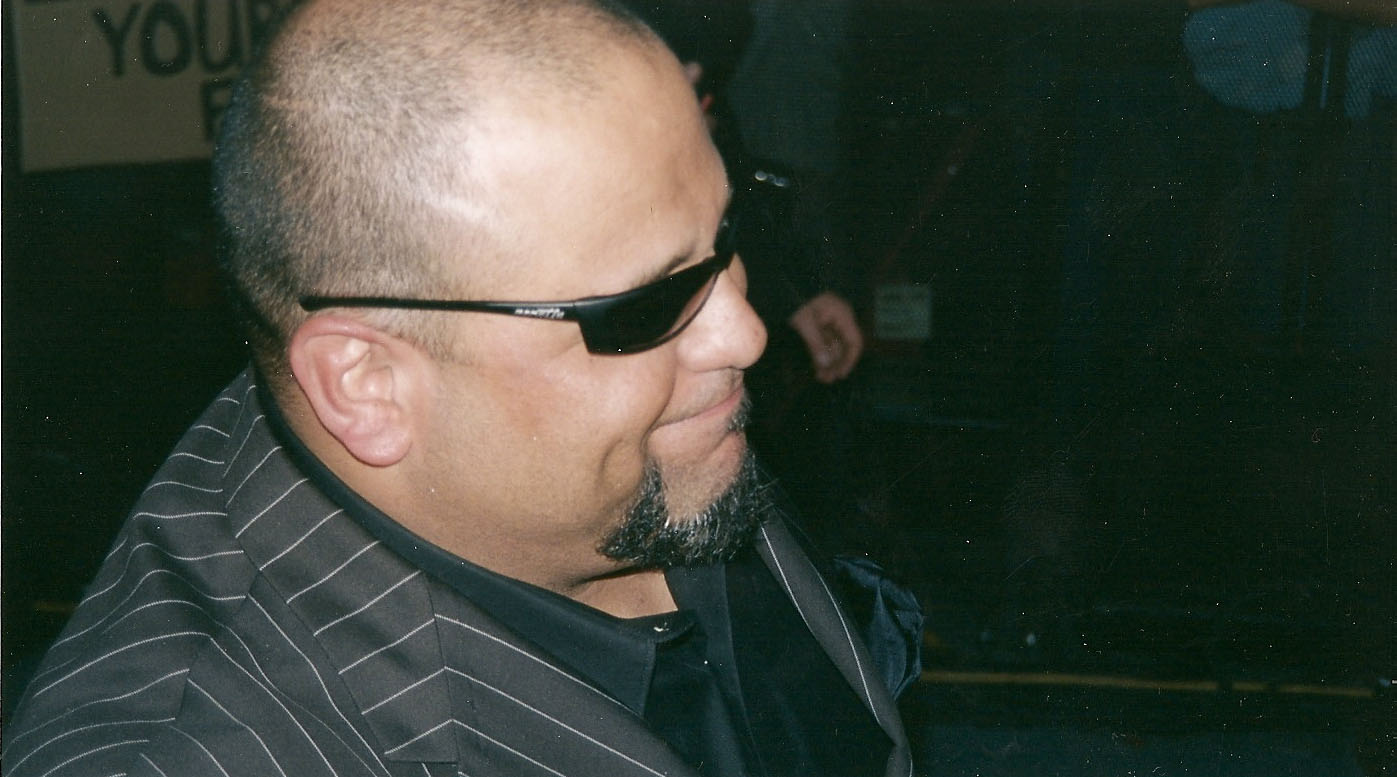
Taz signing autographs in 2006

In February 2006, Tazz and his SmackDown! broadcasting partner, Michael Cole, hosted a week-long trial run of a show on Howard 101 on Sirius Satellite Radio, but the show was not picked up. He also hosted a talk show on 92.3 Free FM at sporadic intervals between late summer 2006 and early 2007, but it was not picked up and the station changed formats, replacing all post morning programming with music. On June 11, 2006, Taz returned to the ring to squash former rival Jerry Lawler at ECW One Night Stand which would be his final match.

During the recording of the April 29, 2008 episode of ECW, Tazz's broadcast partner Mike Adamle abruptly walked off set prior to the main event. Moments later, after reading the promo for the upcoming Judgement Day pay-per-view, Tazz walked out as well, leaving the main event with no commentators. On December 13, 2010, Tazz joined Right After Wrestling and said that it "pisses him off" when companies try to re-create the original ECW. He stated that the original ECW worked because "It was that era, that group of people, that leader in Paul Heyman. We were that little engine that could."

In August 2008, Tazz filled in for Mick Foley as a color commentator on the SmackDown brand after Edge attacked Foley in the previous week, while Raw wrestler Matt Striker filled in for Tazz on the ECW brand. When Foley left the company, Tazz became the permanent color commentator for the SmackDown brand once again. On April 3, 2009, WWE announced that Tazz had left WWE when his contract had expired before WrestleMania 25. Two days later after his departure from WWE, his WWE.com profile was moved from the active SmackDown roster list to the alumni list.

In October 2018, Senerchia talked about what led to his WWE departure stating "I left on my own terms. My contract was up the week going into WrestleMania, I wasn't there. That was it. I was done at the Dallas TV before that...They offered me a new deal, which was a great deal...I had to get out of there....I saw Vince in Dallas and I officially gave word, shook his hand, said I was leaving in Dallas. He and I were crying and hugging, 'I'm gonna miss you.' I thanked him for everything. It was great. I remember talking to Stephanie [McMahon] and Triple H……Stephanie was just looking at me, 'I'm really surprised. Why are you doing this?' She couldn't understand why I would leave. She wasn't mean. She wasn't disrespectful. 'I need to do this. I appreciate everything you've done for me. There's no ill will.' She was the same way with me. So was Hunter. They were extremely awesome to me; but, like an adult to an adult she was just wondering why and I was, 'I just need a break'". In April 2020, Senerchia further reflected his other reasons for his WWE departure stating "I didn't want to be around anybody named McMahon at that time, They were annoying, and it was the pompous, the arrogance. But the arrogance, not politics, the arrogance. That's what I keep saying. That's the adjective that keeps jumping out at me. Just the disposition of that elitist attitude, it got to the point where I was like, 'you know what?..I'm out.'"

=== Total Nonstop Action Wrestling (2009–2015) ===
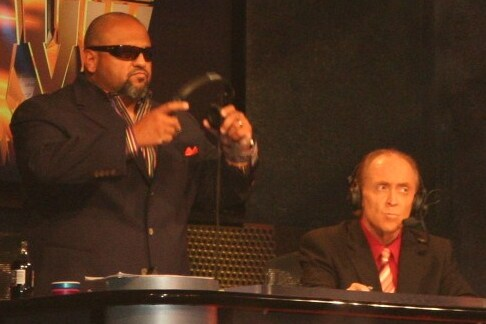
Taz (left) with his commentary partner, Mike Tenay in July 2010

At Victory Road, Senercia, under his Taz ring name, made his official Total Nonstop Action Wrestling (TNA) debut during Samoa Joe's match against Sting, revealing himself to be Joe's on-screen adviser and consequently a heel as well as an ally of the Main Event Mafia. The match ending was booked as Taz's presence enabling Joe to recover from Sting's Scorpion Deathlock and win the match via submission after applying the Coquina Clutch.

On the August 20, 2009 episode of Impact!, Taz replaced Don West as the promotion's color commentator and also became a face upon stating that he was only loosely associated with the Mafia and that he had taught Joe everything he knew and that it was now up to Joe to use his newfound skills. In May 2012, Taz began appearing as a judge in the monthly TNA Gut Check segment on Impact Wrestling.

On the January 17, 2013 episode of Impact Wrestling, Taz was a groomsman at the wedding between Bully Ray and Brooke Hogan. As Ray and Brooke exchanged their vows, Taz interrupted the ceremony and proclaimed himself to be a member of Aces & Eights after revealing a kutte underneath his coat, turning heel again in the process. Following his revelation, Aces & Eights ambushed the ceremony and attacked Ray, his groomsmen Tommy Dreamer and Brother Runt and Brooke's father Hulk Hogan. The following week on Impact Wrestling, Taz revealed that he joined Aces & Eights because of his desire to be a member of a group that adheres to a higher power. On the November 21 episode of Impact Wrestling, Aces & Eights was forced to disband after Bully Ray lost to Mr. Anderson, which also saw Anderson retain his career in TNA.

On April 15, 2015, it was officially announced that Taz had departed TNA.

Three days later on April 18, 2015, Taz stated that what led to his TNA departure was that he was asked for his release and he got it and said that it was all professional and he left the proper way. He revealed that his deal was due to expire in the summer anyway and was already looking into alternatives and the way he said it was that he was not going to renew his deal anyway even though TNA wanted him to stay. He confirmed the reports that payments were not coming in and his checks came late and had to do what he had to do. "I did a service, I wasn't paid for that service," Taz said, adding that TNA understood his situation. Once the checks were not coming, he gave TNA his notice and that was it. He said that he would have liked to make a little bit more money but then again everyone felt like that and despite not making the most he was happy from the financial side of things".

=== Return to WWE (2016) ===
In November 2016, Taz made an appearance on the WWE Network special, The Authentic Untold Story of ECW, alongside former ECW management Paul Heyman and wrestlers Bubba Ray Dudley, D-Von Dudley, and Tommy Dreamer. In the one-hour special hosted by Corey Graves, the guests talked about their experiences in ECW and the promotion's legacy on professional wrestling.

=== All Elite Wrestling (2019–present) ===
On October 12, 2019, Taz made a guest appearance for All Elite Wrestling (AEW), where he appeared on the October 22 edition of AEW Dark as a guest commentator. On November 9, 2019, Taz made his guest appearance during Full Gear as the pre-show commentator. On the January 1, 2020 episode of AEW Dynamite, Taz made his Dynamite debut on commentary filling in for Tony Schiavone. On January 16, 2020, it was announced that Taz had officially signed a multi-year deal with AEW, and he was made a member of the AEW broadcast team.

At Double or Nothing on May 20, 2020, Taz accompanied newcomer Brian Cage to the ring during the Casino Ladder Match and in what appeared to be the role of a manager, establishing himself as a heel in the process. Cage would win the match, which also made him the number one contender for the AEW World Championship, and Taz celebrated the victory with him afterwards. On Night 2 of Fyter Fest, Taz rewarded Cage with the FTW Championship he held during his later years in ECW. At Fight for the Fallen, Cage lost to Jon Moxley after Taz threw in the towel. Soon after, Taz would recruit Ricky Starks to create a group known as Team Taz along with Cage as they began feuding with Darby Allin. On the November 18, 2020 episode of Dynamite, Will Hobbs joined Team Taz after hitting Cody Rhodes with Cage's FTW championship belt and then helping Taz, Cage and Starks when they attacked Rhodes and Allin.

On August 4, 2021, it was announced that Taz would permanently join the commentary team on AEW Rampage beginning August 13, 2021. In June 2022, Taz switched to full-time commentary on AEW Dynamite, in a commentary team rotation swap with Jim Ross.

In October 2024, Taz was attacked by an unknown wrestler, later revealed to be Christian Cage of The Patriarchy. This was done to write Taz off of television to allow him to get knee replacement surgery.

== Professional wrestling style and persona ==
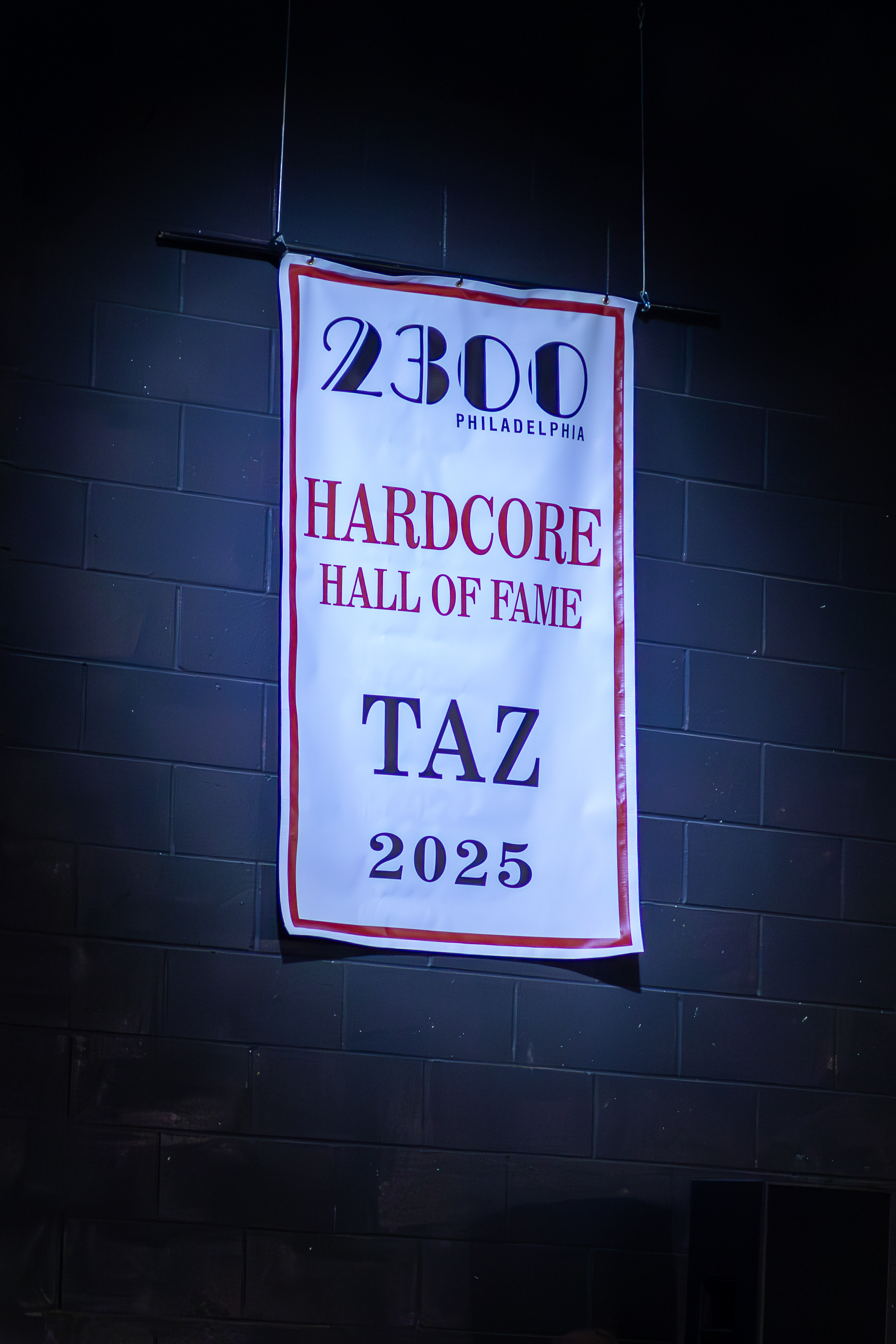
Senerchia's Hardcore Hall of Fame banner from 2300 Arena received as a 2025 inductee.

During the initial part of his career, Senerchia wrestled as the "Tazmaniac", a mute "wild man" and savage archetype wrestling barefoot common to professional wrestling in that era, influenced by The Missing Link, the Steiner Brothers, and the Wild Samoans.

After Senerchia legitimately broke his neck in 1995 and took a prolonged hiatus, he transitioned to a mixed martial arts-influenced character upon his return to action simply known as "Taz". Inside the ring, Taz became known as the "Human Suplex Machine" due to his wide array of suplex variations (dubbed "Tazplexes" by ECW commentator Joey Styles) and introduced a new finishing move, the Tazmission, a Kata ha jime judo chokehold, drawn from his own legitimate background in Judo. Within professional wrestling, Tazz is often credited as the person who popularised forcing opponents to "tap out" to signal a submission (previously, the convention was to verbally submit), something he brought over from MMA. Taz also sometimes combined this submission with a suplex, creating a half nelson choke suplex, called the Tazmission-Plex. He has also claimed to have named the T-Bone Suplex. When Taz was signed by WWF, other wrestlers complained to Vince McMahon about his style, calling him dangerous and didn't want to work with him. However, Kurt Angle defended Taz, saying that "Taz was never dangerous with his suplexes". As part of his new character, Taz completely dropped his previous persona and became a foul-mouthed, Brooklyn-accented, rage-filled thug known as "the Most Miserable Man on the Planet".

== Personal life ==
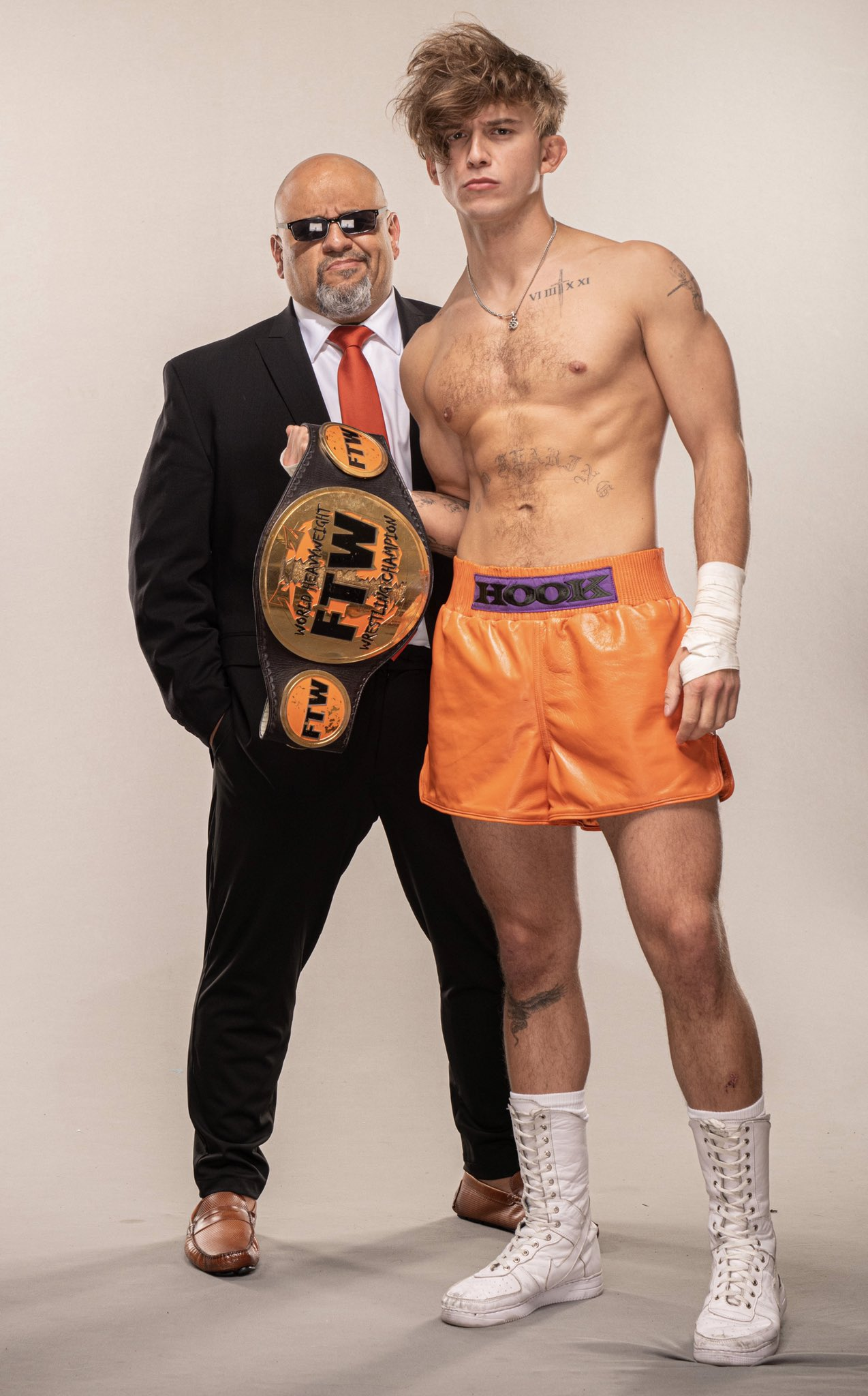
Taz with his son Tyler, who is currently wrestling as Hook in All Elite Wrestling (AEW)

Senerchia is of Italian descent. He is the cousin of fellow retired professional wrestler Chris Chetti and wrestler Joe Chetti (Tazmanaic 2). Senerchia is married to Teresa Smith, and together they have one son, Tyler Cole (born May 4, 1999), who is also a professional wrestler better known under the ring name Hook. Tyler has trained with Cody Rhodes and made several appearances in AEW as part of his father's stable Team Taz, debuting in action on December 10, 2021.

Senerchia has a tattoo of the Looney Tunes character Tasmanian Devil on his upper right biceps, which he states he got after being inspired by an identical tattoo sported by Road Warrior Animal. He also has a self-designed tattoo on his left lower bicep.

Senerchia played high school football, as well as in college, playing for the LIU Post Pioneers. He also studied judo prior to entering the professional wrestling circuit, reaching a second-degree black belt. He is a supporter of the New York Mets, New York Knicks, Philadelphia 76ers, New York Islanders, and the Buffalo Bills.

=== Legal issues ===
In September 1998, Senerchia was arrested on charges of indecent exposure and contributing to the delinquency of a child after allegedly exposing himself to a 15-year-old salon worker during a massage. The charges were dropped in October 1999.

== Other media ==
Beginning in 2018, Senerchia was a nationally syndicated morning radio personality, co-hosting Taz and The Moose with Marc "The Moose" Malusis on CBS Sports Radio weekdays from 6-9 a.m. Eastern. In December 2019, Senerchia announced he was leaving the show.

Senerchia also had his own podcast, called The Taz Show (formerly known as The Human Podcast Machine), where he discusses the latest in the professional wrestling world. The show has since discontinued.

Senerchia (as Taz) appears as a playable character in ECW Hardcore Revolution, WWF No Mercy, WWF SmackDown! 2: Know Your Role, WWE WrestleMania X8, WWF SmackDown! Just Bring It, WWF Road to WrestleMania, WWE SmackDown! Shut Your Mouth, WWE SmackDown vs. Raw 2007 and WWE SmackDown vs. Raw 2009.

== Championships and accomplishments ==
- Century Wrestling Alliance
  - CWA Light Heavyweight Championship (1 time)
- Eastern Championship Wrestling / Extreme Championship Wrestling
  - ECW World Heavyweight Championship (2 times)
  - FTW Heavyweight Championship (2 times, inaugural)
  - ECW World Television Championship (2 times)
  - ECW World Tag Team Championship (3 times) – with Kevin Sullivan (2 times) and Sabu (1 time)
  - ECW Triple Crown Champion
- Hardcore Hall of Fame
  - Class of 2025
- International World Class Championship Wrestling
  - IWCCW Light Heavyweight Championship (1 time)
- Pro Wrestling Illustrated
  - Ranked No. 10 of the 500 best singles wrestlers in the PWI 500 in 1999
  - PWI ranked him No. 147 of the top 500 singles wrestlers of the "PWI Years" in 2003
- World Wrestling Federation
  - WWF Hardcore Championship (3 times)
  - WWF Tag Team Championship (1 time) – with Spike Dudley
- Wrestling Observer Newsletter
  - Worst Gimmick (2013) Aces & Eights
  - Worst Television Announcer (2013)
  - Best Non-Wrestler (2020)
- Victory Championship Wrestling
  - VCW Hall of Fame (Class of 2018)
