= Wrestlepalooza (2000) =

2000 Extreme Championship Wrestling event

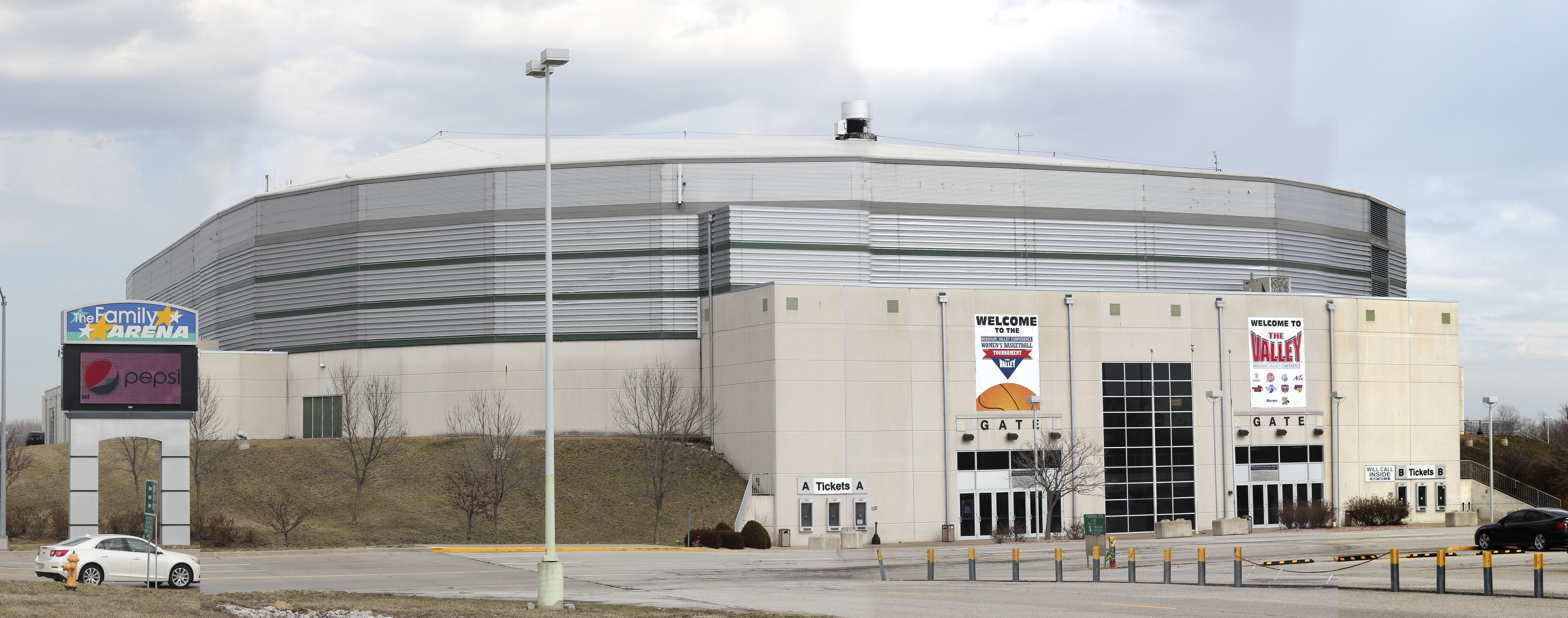
- The Family Arena.
- Promotion: Extreme Championship Wrestling
- Date: April 16, 2000
- City: St. Charles, Missouri, U.S.
- Venue: Family Arena
- Attendance: 2,500

Event chronology
| ← Previous; Re-enter the Sandman | Next → CyberSlam |

Wrestlepalooza chronology
| ← Previous; 1998 | Next → 2025 |

Wrestlepalooza (2000) was the fourth Wrestlepalooza professional wrestling event produced by Extreme Championship Wrestling (ECW). The event took place on April 16, 2000 in the Family Arena in St. Charles, Missouri. Wrestlepalooza was a live event, which featured matches taped for the April 21 episode of ECW on TNN and the April 23 episode of Hardcore TV.

It was the final Wrestlepalooza held under the ECW banner, until the event was revived in 2025 by WWE.

== Event ==
=== Pre-show ===
Simon Diamond kicked off the show by blaming H. C. Loc for not being a fair referee. Diamond then led his group into attacking Loc, who then took off his referee shirt and handed it to The Musketeer, who officiated the match between Diamond and Loc. Loc hit a diving crossbody on both men and pinned Diamond, counting the pinfall himself for the victory.

Next, Chilly Willy competed against Johnny Swinger. Willy attempted a sunset flip on Swinger but Judge Jeff Jones tried to block it until the referee kicked Swinger and Jones' arms apart, allowing Willy to pin Swinger for the win.

=== Hardcore TV ===
The following three matches were taped for the April 23 episode of Hardcore TV. Nova and Chris Chetti defeated The New Dangerous Alliance (C. W. Anderson and Bill Wiles) in a tag team match.

In the following match, Kid Kash competed against Super Crazy. Crazy executed a brainbuster for the win.

Next, Danny Doring and Roadkill took on The Full Blooded Italians (Little Guido and Sal E. Graziano) in a tag team match. Roadkill hit an Amish Splash on Graziano to win the match. After the match, Da Baldies (Angel and Tony DeVito) attacked Doring and Roadkill.

=== ECW on TNN ===
The next three matches were taped for the April 21 episode of ECW on TNN. The Impact Players defended the World Tag Team Championship against Raven and Mikey Whipwreck. Credible hit a That's Incredible to Whipwreck to retain the titles.

This was followed by a match between Scotty Anton and Rhino. Rhino put the referee and Anton through a table, thus ending the match in a no contest. After the match, Rob Van Dam made the save and attacked Rhino and the two men brawled with each other until several wrestlers from the locker room stormed to the ringside and then The Network left the ringside.

Next, Tommy Dreamer competed against Steve Corino in an Extreme Bullrope match. The match evolved into a six-man tag team Street Fight after interference by Jack Victory, The Sandman, New Jack and Yoshihiro Tajiri as Dreamer teamed with Sandman and Jack against Corino, Victory and Tajiri. Tajiri accidentally misted Corino and Jack hit a 187 for the win. After the match, Rhino came out and Network attacked Dreamer's team until Dusty Rhodes made the save by hitting Bionic Elbows on Rhino and Sandman caned him to make Network retreat to the backstage.

== Aftermath ==
Steve Corino and Dusty Rhodes competed against each other in a match at CyberSlam. Super Crazy and Kid Kash competed against each other in a three-way dance, also involving Little Guido at CyberSlam.

The feud between Da Baldies and the team of Danny Doring and Roadkill continued as the two teams competed against Nova and Chris Chetti in a three-way dance at Hardcore Heaven.

This event would be the final Wrestlepalooza produced by ECW, as the promotion closed its door one years later. In 2025, the WWE, which acquired the assets of ECW from bankruptcy in 2003, revived the Wrestlepalooza event.

== Results ==
| No. | Results | Stipulations | Times |
|---|---|---|---|
| 1 | H. C. Loc defeated Simon Diamond (with Mitch, Prodigy, Prodigette and The Musketeer) | Singles match | N/A |
| 2 | Chilly Willy defeated Johnny Swinger (with Judge Jeff Jones) | Singles match | N/A |
| No. | Results (Hardcore TV – April 23, 2000) | Stipulations | Times |
| 3 | Nova and Chris Chetti defeated The New Dangerous Alliance (C. W. Anderson and Bill Wiles) (with Lou E. Dangerously and Elektra) | Tag team match | N/A |
| 4 | Super Crazy defeated Kid Kash | Singles match | N/A |
| 5 | Danny Doring and Roadkill defeated The Full Blooded Italians (Little Guido and Sal E. Graziano) | Tag team match | N/A |
| No. | Results (ECW on TNN – April 21, 2000) | Stipulations | Times |
| 6 | The Impact Players (Justin Credible and Lance Storm) (c) (with Dawn Marie) defeated Raven and Mikey Whipwreck (with Francine) | Tag team match for the ECW World Tag Team Championship | 4:06 |
| 7 | Rhino (with The Network) fought Scotty Anton to a no contest | Singles match | 2:21 |
| 8 | Tommy Dreamer, The Sandman and New Jack defeated The Network (Steve Corino, Jack Victory and Yoshihiro Tajiri) | Street fight | 14:49 |
(c) – refers to the champion(s) heading into the match

== See also ==
- 2000 in professional wrestling
