= Wrestlepalooza (2025) =

WWE premium live event

- Promotional poster featuring John Cena and Brock Lesnar
- Promotion: WWE
- Brands: Raw; SmackDown
- Date: September 20, 2025
- City: Indianapolis, Indiana
- Venue: Gainbridge Fieldhouse
- Attendance: 15,176

WWE event chronology
← Previous; Worlds Collide: Las Vegas	Next → NXT No Mercy

Wrestlepalooza chronology
← Previous; 2000	Next → 2026

The 2025 Wrestlepalooza, also promoted as Wrestlepalooza: Indianapolis, was a professional wrestling premium live event (PLE) produced by WWE, held for wrestlers from the promotion's main roster brands, Raw and SmackDown. It was WWE's first annual Wrestlepalooza, and the fifth Wrestlepalooza overall, and took place on Saturday, September 20, 2025, at the Gainbridge Fieldhouse in Indianapolis, Indiana. This was the first Wrestlepalooza since 2000, which was produced by the former Extreme Championship Wrestling, the assets of which WWE acquired in 2003.

This was WWE's first main roster PLE to be livestreamed on ESPN's direct-to-consumer streaming service in the United States, following the expiration of WWE's contract with Peacock for these events the prior month. This would also be the only Wrestlepalooza to livestream on Disney+ in the Philippines, the WWE Network in a select few countries, and Abema in Japan, as they all merged to Netflix in 2026. The event featured Lesnar's first match since the 2023 SummerSlam, AJ Lee's first match in over 10 years, and The Usos's (Jey Uso and Jimmy Uso) first traditional tag team match on a PLE since the 2023 Money in the Bank.

Five matches were contested at the event. In the main event, Cody Rhodes defeated Drew McIntyre to retain SmackDown's Undisputed WWE Championship. In the event's other matches, Stephanie Vaquer defeated Iyo Sky to win Raw's vacant Women's World Championship, CM Punk and AJ Lee defeated Seth Rollins and Becky Lynch in a mixed tag team match, The Vision (Bron Breakker and Bronson Reed) defeated The Usos with LA Knight as the special guest referee, and in the opening bout, Brock Lesnar defeated John Cena.

== Production ==
=== Background ===
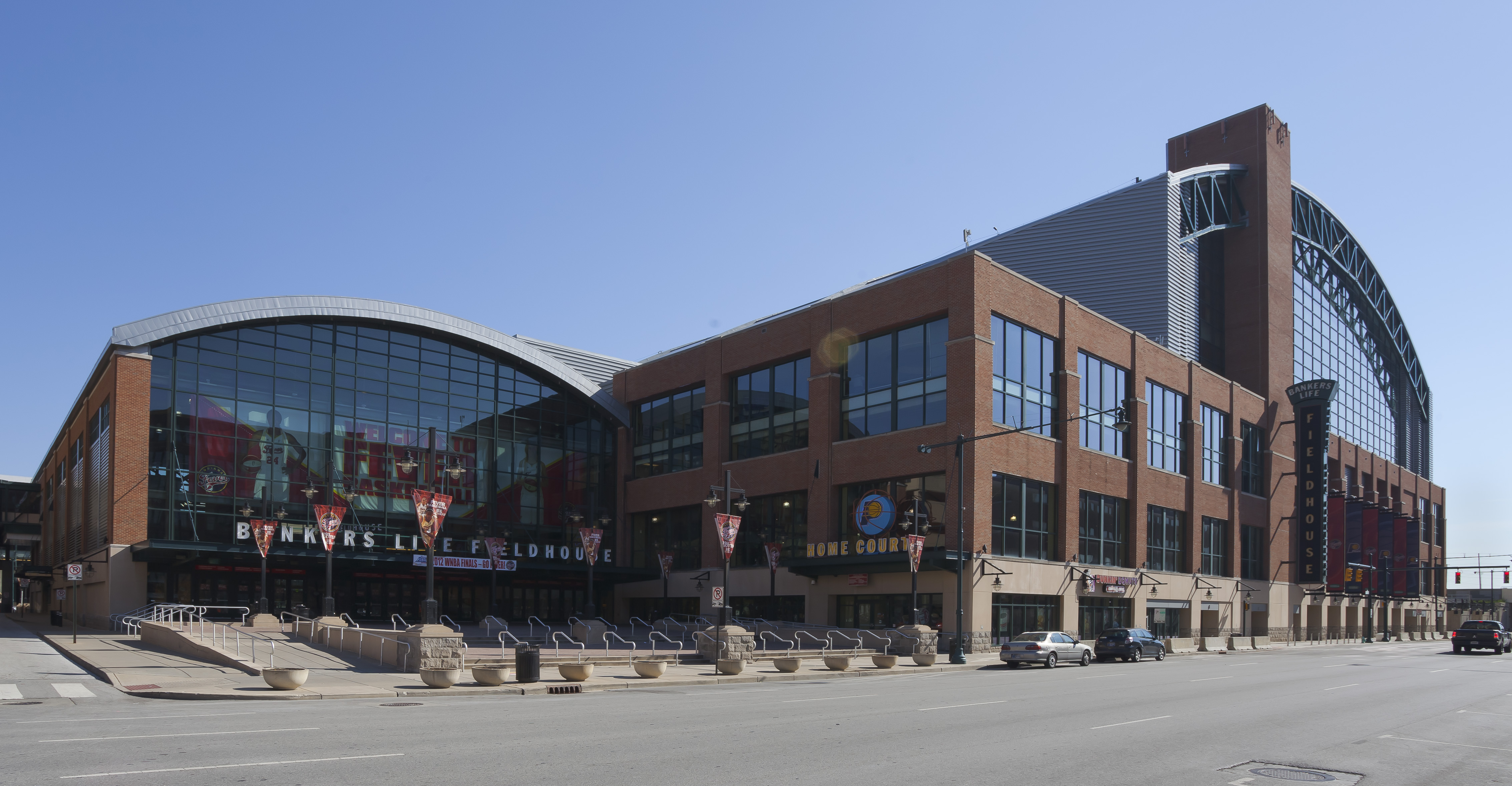
The fifth Wrestlepalooza, which was the first produced by WWE and the first since 2000, was held at the Gainbridge Fieldhouse in Indianapolis, Indiana (pictured in 2012 under its previous name of Bankers Life Fieldhouse).

Wrestlepalooza was the name of a professional wrestling event produced by the former Extreme Championship Wrestling (ECW) that was held in 1995, 1997, 1998, and 2000—the 1998 iteration aired on pay-per-view (PPV) while the others were live events partially syndicated across television. In 2003, WWE acquired the assets of ECW from bankruptcy. On August 20, 2025, just over 25 years since the last event by ECW in April 2000, WWE officially announced the return of Wrestlepalooza, and the fifth overall, as its own premium live event (PLE), scheduled for Saturday, September 20, 2025, at the Gainbridge Fieldhouse in Indianapolis, Indiana. The event was in turn promoted as Wrestlepalooza: Indianapolis and it was held for wrestlers from the promotion's Raw and SmackDown brand divisions.

The event was held as part of a deal between WWE and the Indiana Sports Corp, which includes a future SummerSlam and WrestleMania in Indianapolis at the Lucas Oil Stadium, as well as a Royal Rumble at the same stadium, which occurred earlier in the year. The deal also encompassed Monday Night Raw and Friday Night SmackDown tapings and "other select events" which Wrestlepalooza fell under.

After the announcement, WWE Chief Content Officer Paul "Triple H" Levesque and WWE wrestlers CM Punk and Seth Rollins conducted interviews over various ESPN shows including First Take and SportsCenter with Levesque announcing that Pat McAfee would return at the event. Tickets for the event went on sale on August 22, 2025. According to WrestleTix on X, over 8,000 tickets were sold within the first 24 hours. The official theme song of the event was "Nokia" by Drake.

Wrestlepalooza was originally scheduled to go head-to-head with rival company All Elite Wrestling (AEW), airing against AEW's All Out PPV event. This would have been WWE's first main roster PLE to counterprogram an AEW PPV; previously, only select NXT PLEs had aired directly against AEW's PPVs. However, on September 3, 2025, AEW announced All Out's start time would be pushed up to 3:00 p.m. Eastern Time, avoiding a direct conflict with Wrestlepalooza.

=== Broadcast outlets ===
The PLE was broadcast on traditional PPV outlets worldwide. It was also available to livestream on SuperSport in Sub-Saharan Africa, Disney+ in the Philippines, Abema in Japan, Netflix in most other international markets, and the WWE Network in a select few countries that had not yet transferred to Netflix due to pre-existing contracts. In the United States, the event was the first covered by a five-year agreement between WWE and ESPN Inc., under which WWE's main roster PLEs would stream exclusively on the ESPN app for subscribers to its networks. The agreement succeeded one with Peacock, which concluded after Clash in Paris the prior month, although Peacock maintained NXT's PLEs until March 2026, as well as other select WWE content, such as Saturday Night's Main Event, until at least 2029. This switchover to ESPN was originally to begin with WrestleMania 42 in April 2026, but by a technicality, WWE fulfilled their obligations to Peacock early.

Wrestlepalooza was exclusively available via both ESPN's "Unlimited" direct-to-consumer subscription, as well as via TV Everywhere authentication for subscribers via participating television providers. Not all television providers reached agreements at launch to carry the new service, with major holdouts including Altice, Cox, Dish Network, Xfinity, and YouTube TV. ESPN stated that it planned to reach agreements with most of these providers by the end of 2025.

ESPN and other Disney properties heavily promoted Wrestlepalooza during the lead up to the event: WWE talent appeared on programming such as First Take, Get Up, ESPN College Football, Sunday Night Baseball (where Jey Uso delivered the ceremonial first pitch at an ESPN-televised Major League Baseball game), SportsCenter, and Good Morning America. ESPN2 televised a Wrestlepalooza preview special on September 19, while ESPN's social media platforms streamed a two-hour Road to Wrestlepalooza pre-show prior to WWE's official kickoff show, which was hosted by O'Shea Jackson Jr. and TJ Jefferson.

=== Storylines ===
The event included five matches that resulted from scripted storylines. Results were predetermined by WWE's writers on the Raw and SmackDown brands, while storylines were produced on WWE's weekly television shows, Monday Night Raw and Friday Night SmackDown.

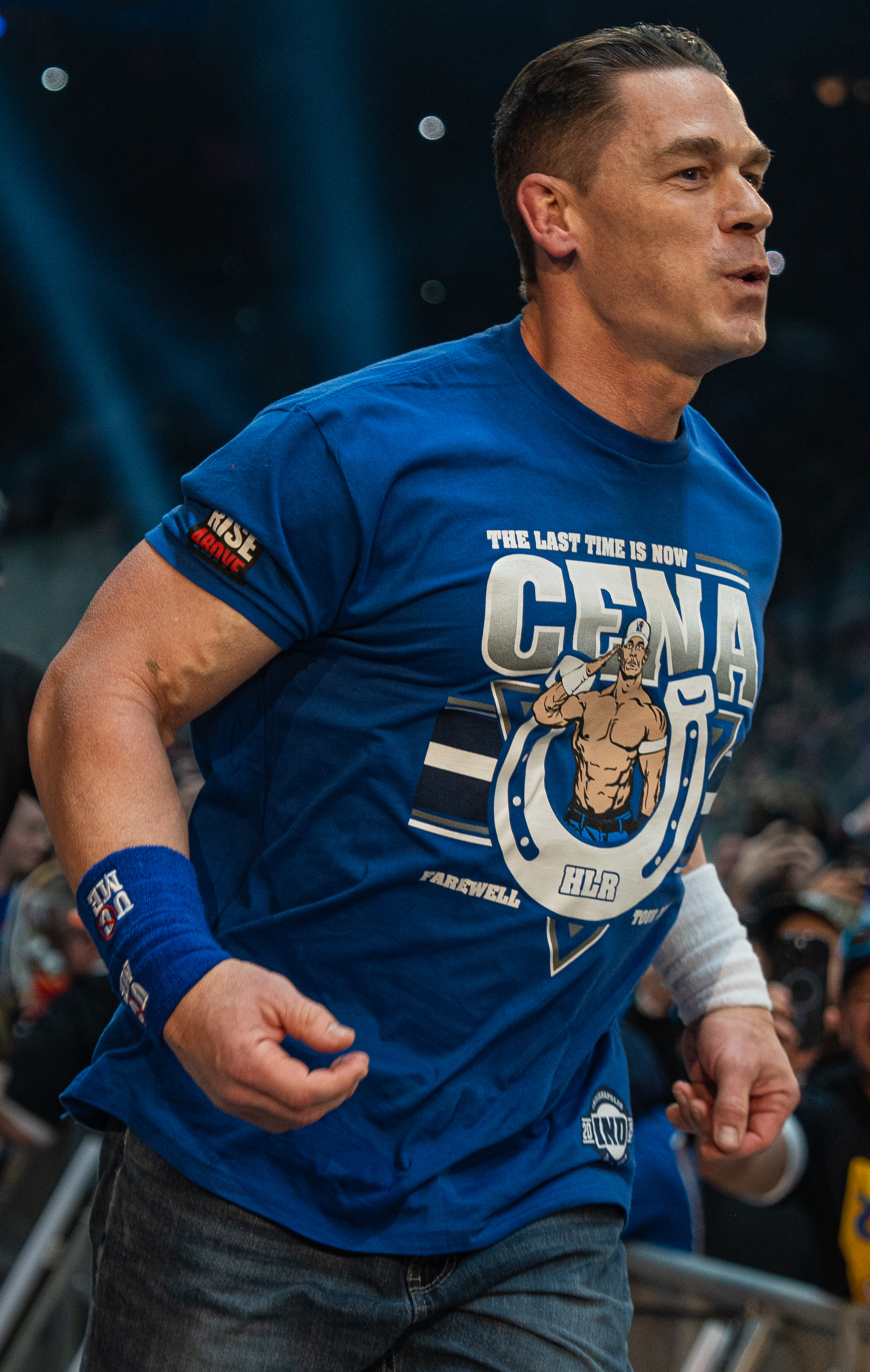
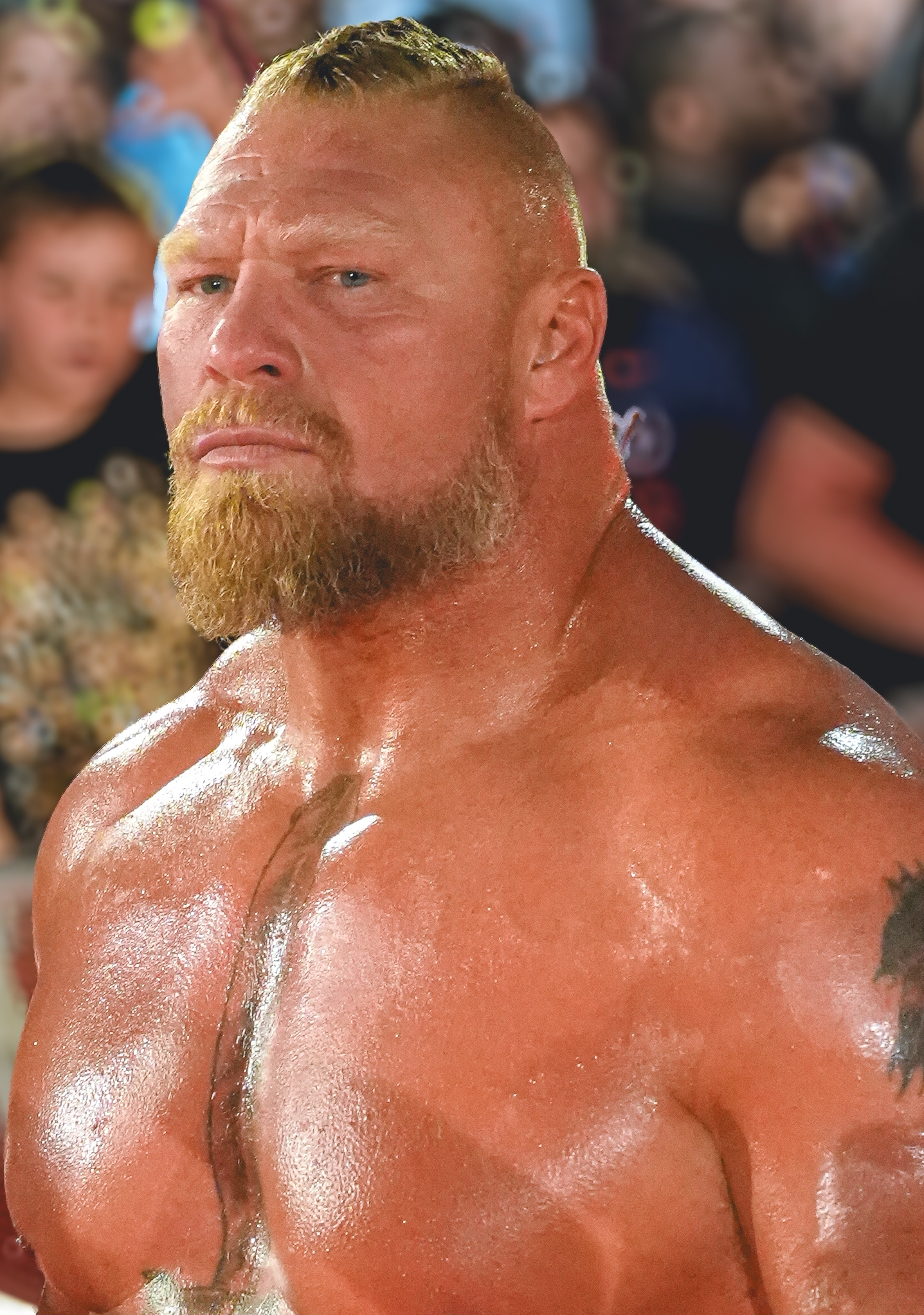
In their last match against each other, John Cena fought Brock Lesnar in the opening bout of the event.

After losing SmackDown's Undisputed WWE Championship in the main event of Night 2 of SummerSlam, John Cena was confronted and attacked by returning longtime rival Brock Lesnar, making his first appearance since the 2023 SummerSlam. On the September 5 episode of SmackDown, Lesnar interfered in Cena's match, causing the match to end in a no-contest, and attacked Cena once again. Following the attack, Lesnar called Cena a "bitch" and stated that he would see Cena at Wrestlepalooza. A match between both men was subsequently confirmed for the event.

At the all-women's event Evolution, Raw's Stephanie Vaquer won the Evolution Battle Royal to earn a women's world championship match at Clash in Paris, while later that night, Naomi cashed-in her Money in the Bank contract and won Raw's Women's World Championship from Iyo Sky. The next night on Raw, it was confirmed that Vaquer's match would be for the Women's World Championship. Subsequently, at SummerSlam the following month, Naomi retained the title in a triple threat match also involving Sky, although Sky was not pinned. Since Sky was not pinned, she was scheduled to face Naomi for the title on the August 11 episode, however, Naomi was not medically cleared to compete and the title match was cancelled. On the following episode of Raw, it was revealed that the match was cancelled because Naomi would have to relinquish the title due to maternity leave, as she announced she was pregnant with her first child. The following week, Raw General Manager Adam Pearce announced that a match for the vacant Women's World Championship would not take place at Clash in Paris, and instead, Vaquer would challenge a to be announced opponent at a later date to determine the new champion, which Pearce would address the following week, where Pearce announced that Vaquer would face Sky for the vacant title at Wrestlepalooza.

Following WrestleMania 41, Jey Uso had been involved in a rivalry against The Vision (Seth Rollins, Bron Breakker, and Bronson Reed). At Night 1 of SummerSlam, Jey defeated Breakker and Reed in a tag team match, and Jey subsequently competed in a fatal four-way match for Rollins's World Heavyweight Championship, which also involved LA Knight at Clash in Paris in a losing effort. The following night on Raw, Jey and Knight subsequently lost a tag team match against Breakker and Reed, with Breakker pinning Jey. Following the match, Breakker and Reed attacked Jey which prompted his twin brother, SmackDown's Jimmy Uso, to come out and aid Jey. The following week, The Usos were interrupted by Breakker and Reed. After some exchange of words, Jimmy subsequently revealed that after they spoke with Raw General Manager Adam Pearce, The Usos would face Breakker and Reed at Wrestlepalooza. Over the following weeks, innumerable altercations between Jey and Knight happened, and after an altercation between The Usos and Breakker and Reed during the Countdown to Wrestlepalooza pre-show, Pearce announced that Knight would be the special guest referee for the match.

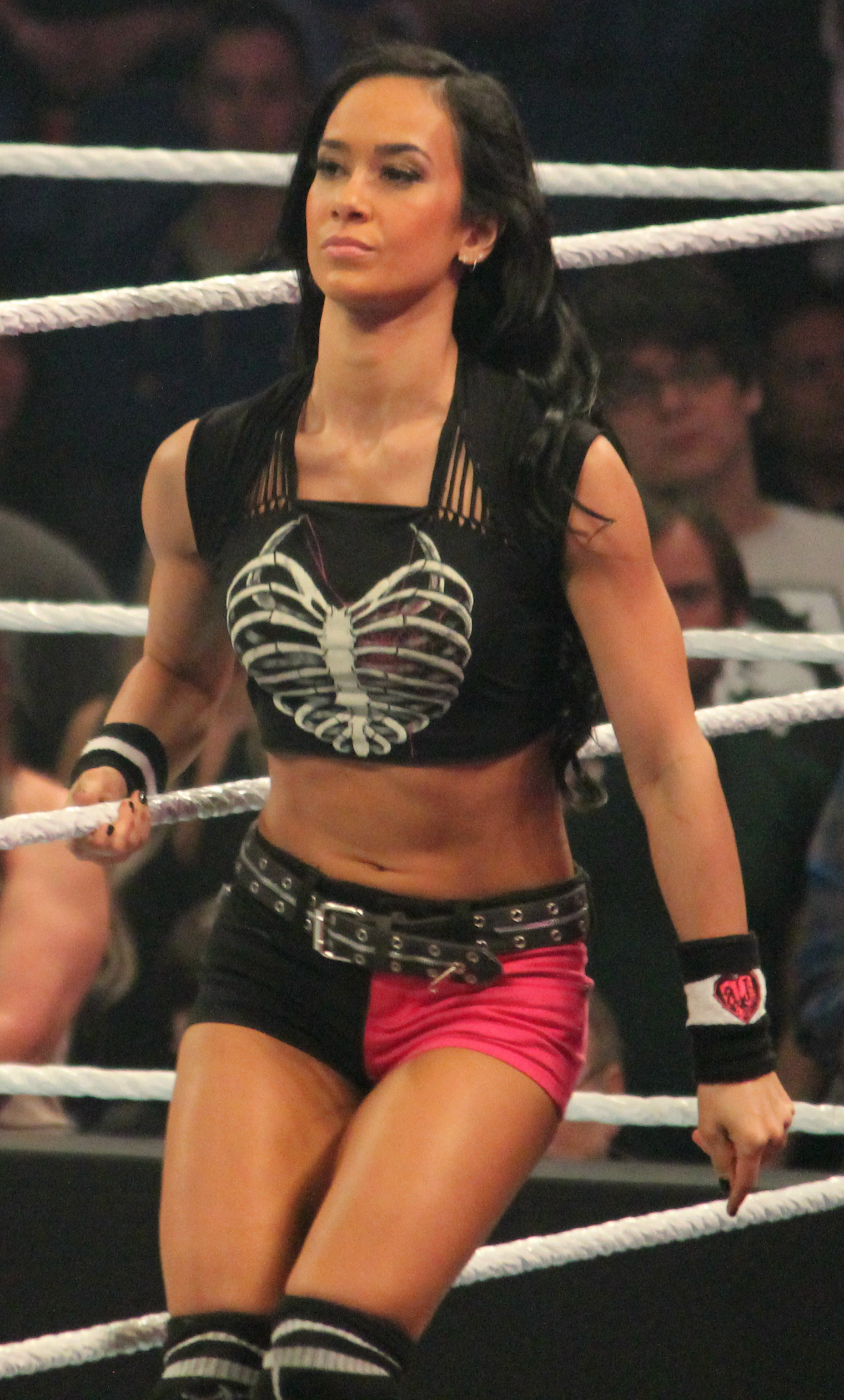
AJ Lee competed in her first professional wrestling match since March 2015.

In the main event of Night 1 of SummerSlam, CM Punk won the World Heavyweight Championship, however, his longtime rival Seth Rollins cashed-in his Money in the Bank contract on Punk and won the championship. Rollins subsequently defended his championship in a fatal four-way match also involving Punk at Clash in Paris, where Rollins successfully retained after his wife, Becky Lynch, performed a low-blow on Punk, with Rollins pinning him. The following night on Raw, Punk called out Rollins, with Lynch appearing instead, stating that she attacked him because after Punk walked out of WWE in 2014, the fans chanted his name during Lynch's matches and never cared about her. She also stated that she attacked Punk because of Punk's constant insults against Rollins. After some more exchange of words, Rollins eventually appeared on the ramp. Punk was about to confront Rollins, however, Rollins left and Lynch subsequently slapped Punk multiple times. Punk stated that Lynch would regret her actions. On that week's SmackDown, Rollins and Lynch were interrupted by Punk, and after more exchange of words, Lynch slapped Punk multiple times once again. Punk then introduced his wife AJ Lee, who made her return to WWE for the first time since 2015. Lee battled with Lynch, who rolled out of the ring leaving behind her WWE Women's Intercontinental Championship, which Lee carried off-stage. On the following week's Raw, Lee appeared with Lynch's title around her waist, and she was subsequently interrupted by Lynch, who wanted her title back. Rollins then appeared, and Lee proposed a mixed tag team match, featuring herself and Punk against Rollins and Lynch, however, Rollins initially declined. Rollins attempted to retrieve Lynch's championship, however, Punk appeared and attempted to perform a GTS on Rollins, who avoided it. Rollins subsequently accepted the mixed tag team match for Wrestlepalooza, with Lee returning the title to Lynch, marking Lee's first match in over 10 years.

On the August 8 episode of SmackDown, Undisputed WWE Champion Cody Rhodes and Drew McIntyre were involved in a tag team match with Rhodes's team winning via disqualification. Following the match, McIntyre attacked Rhodes with the title belt and performed a Claymore Kick on Rhodes through the announce table. A month later on the September 12 episode of SmackDown, after McIntyre defeated Rhodes's longtime friend, Randy Orton, McIntyre was about to perform a Claymore Kick on Orton through the announce table, however, Rhodes returned and assisted Orton. Following a brawl with McIntyre, Rhodes stated that he would see McIntyre at Wrestlepalooza and a title match was subsequently confirmed for the event.

== Event ==
Other on-screen personnel
Role:	Name:
English commentators	Michael Cole
English commentators	Wade Barrett
English commentators	Pat McAfee (First 3 matches)
Spanish commentators	Marcelo Rodríguez
Spanish commentators	Jerry Soto
Ring announcer	Alicia Taylor
Referees	Jessika Carr
Referees	Dan Engler
Referees	LA Knight (Usos vs. The Vision)
Referees	Eddie Orengo
Referees	Ryan Tran
Interviewers	Cathy Kelley
Interviewers	Byron Saxton
Pre-show & post-show panelists	Michael Cole
Pre-show & post-show panelists	Wade Barrett
Pre-show & post-show panelists	Joe Tessitore
Pre-show & post-show panelists	Jackie Redmond
Pre-show & post-show panelists	Big E
Pre-show & post-show panelists	Tyrese Haliburton
Pre-show & post-show panelists	Peter Rosenberg

=== Preliminary matches ===
The PLE began with John Cena facing Brock Lesnar. Before the match began, Paul Heyman appeared and performed his signature ring introduction for Lesnar for the first time since Day 1 in January 2022. Lesnar dominated almost the entire match. Cena performed three Attitude Adjustments on Lesnar for a nearfall. As Cena attempted a Five Knuckle Shuffle on Lesnar, Lesnar rose to his feet and performed two F-5s on Cena. In the end, Lesnar performed two more F-5s on Cena to win the match. Following the match, Lesnar delivered an F-5 to the referee and another F-5 to Cena.

Next, The Vision (Bron Breakker and Bronson Reed, accompanied by Paul Heyman) faced The Usos (Jey Uso and Jimmy Uso) with LA Knight as the special guest referee. In the climax, Jey performed a suicide dive meant for Knight but struck Reed instead. As Jey was about to strike Knight with a steel chair, Breakker performed a Spear on Jey before performing a Spear on Jey and Jimmy through a table. Reed performed a Tsunami on Jey to win the match.

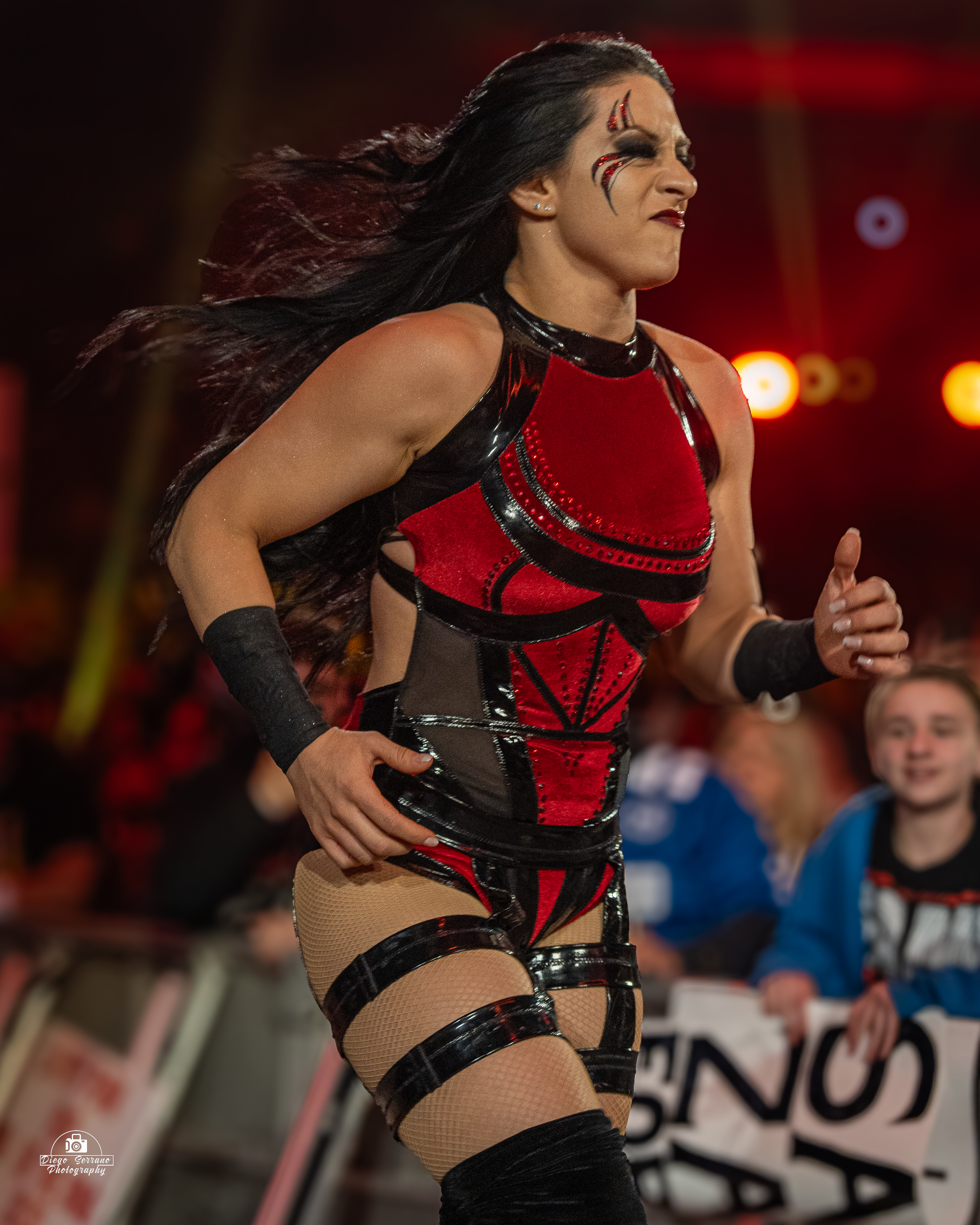
Stephanie Vaquer defeated Iyo Sky to win the vacant Women's World Championship.

After that, Stephanie Vaquer faced Iyo Sky for the vacant Women's World Championship. After a back-and-forth match between the two, Sky attempted a moonsault, but Vaquer moved out of the way and performed the Spiral Tap on Sky to win the title.

In the penultimate match, AJ Lee and CM Punk took on Becky Lynch and Seth Rollins. The ending came when Lee forced Lynch to submit to the Black Widow to win the match.

Before the main event, The Undertaker arrived to announce that Stephanie McMahon would be the first inductee into the 2026 WWE Hall of Fame.

=== Main event ===
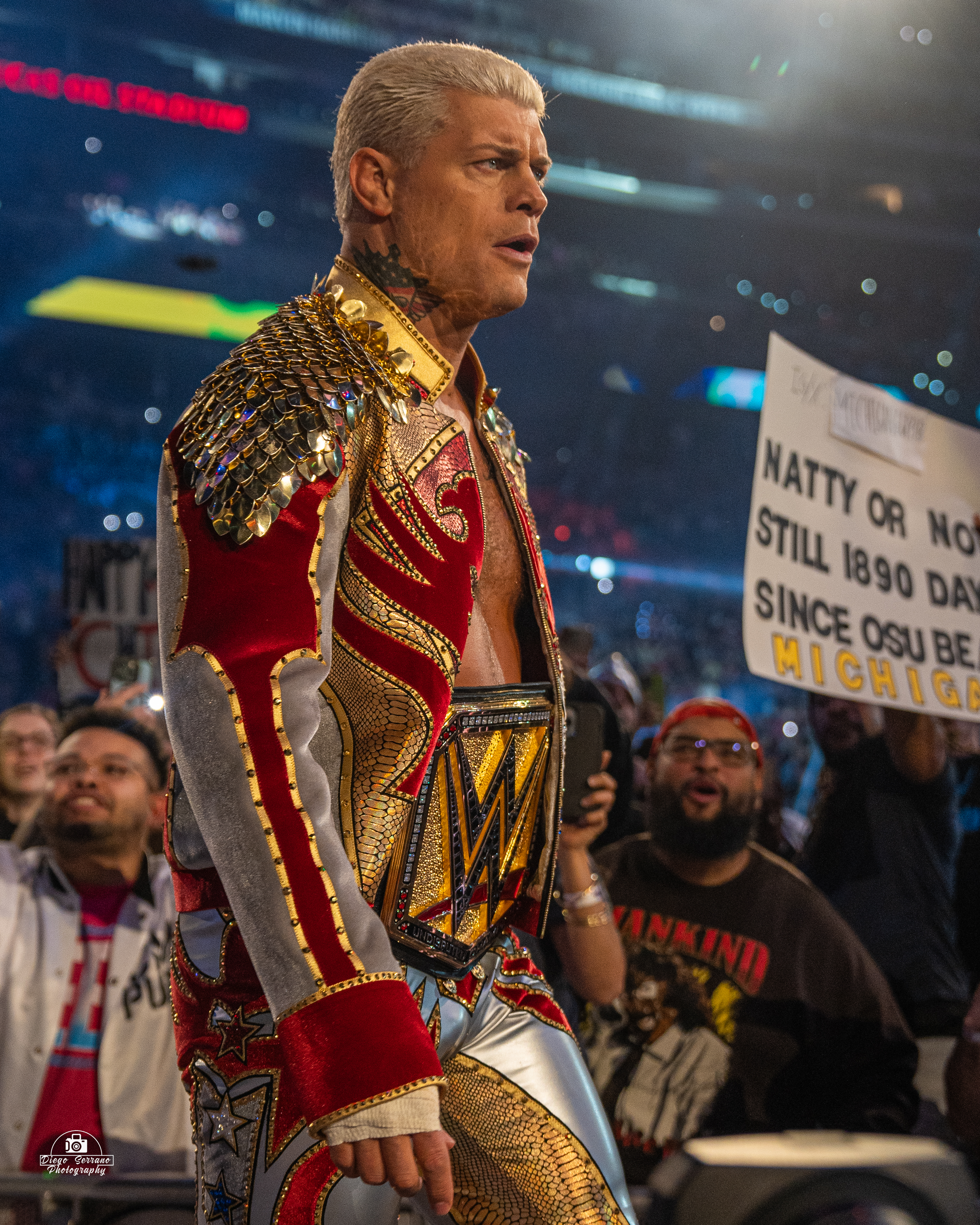
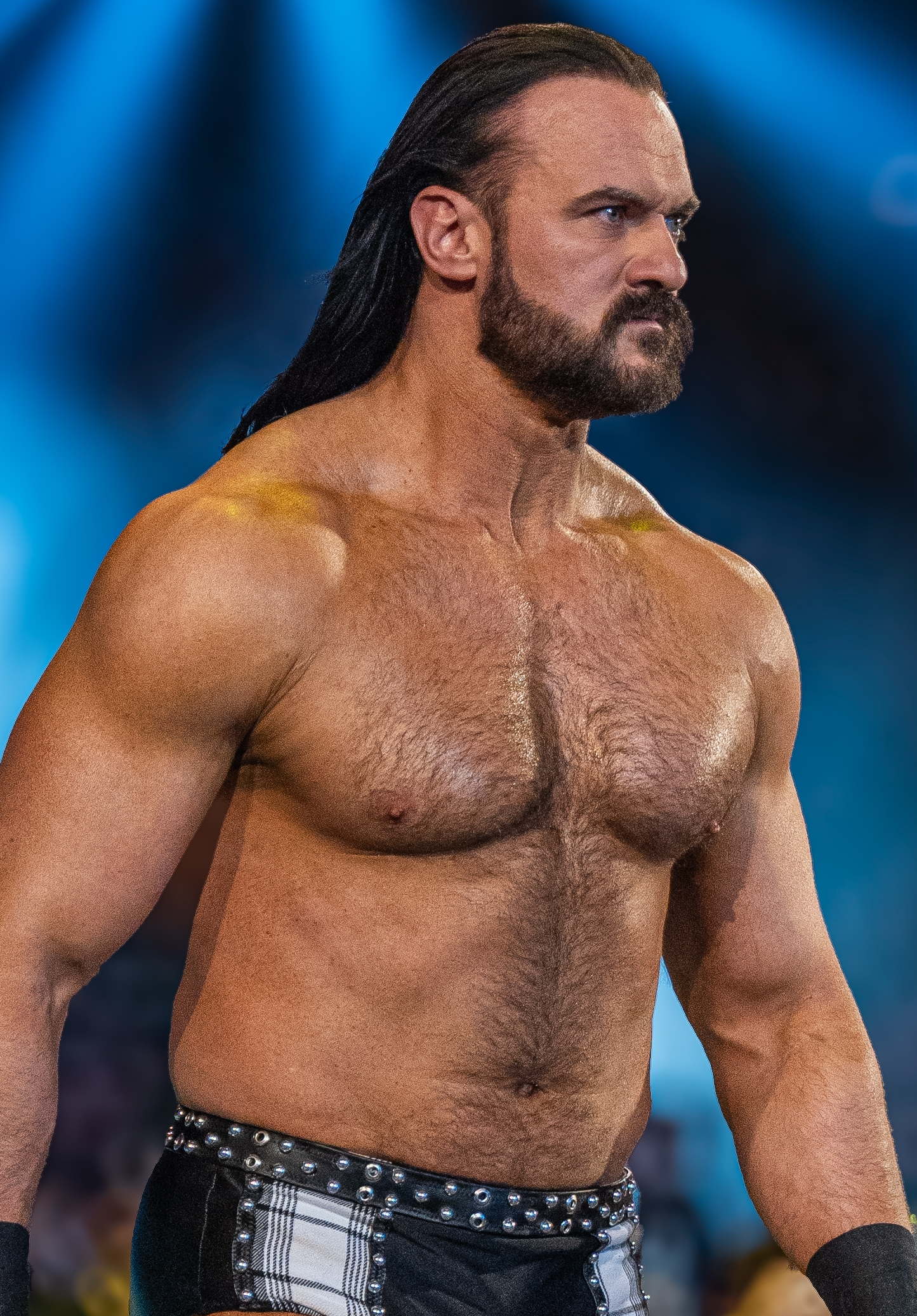
Cody Rhodes successfully defended SmackDown's Undisputed WWE Championship against Drew McIntyre in the main event.

The main event featured Cody Rhodes defending the Undisputed WWE Championship against Drew McIntyre. During the match, McIntyre performed White Noise on Rhodes and attempted a Claymore Kick, but Rhodes countered into a powerbomb for a nearfall. As McIntyre escaped a Figure Four Leglock, the referee moved out of the way, so McIntyre was unable to win despite rolling up Rhodes for more than three seconds. Rhodes performed Cross Rhodes and McIntyre performed a Claymore Kick, with both resulting in nearfalls. As McIntyre attempted a Claymore Kick on an announce table, Rhodes moved out of the way, causing McIntyre's foot to go through the front of the table. Rhodes performed a Cody Cutter and Cross Rhodes on McIntyre to retain the title.

== Reception ==
ESPN writer Andreas Hale gave the event a C, calling the show "average", stating "The excellent Vaquer vs. Sky match saved this show from being truly average", while noting the rest of the card was underwhelming and fell short of expectations.

Wrestling Observer Newsletter journalist Dave Meltzer rated the opening bout 2 stars, the tag team match 3.25 stars, the Women's World Championship match 4.25 stars, the mixed tag team match 3.5 stars, and the main event 3.75 stars. WON also awarded the event with the Worst Event of the Year 2025.

== Aftermath ==
During the post-event show, Undisputed WWE Champion Cody Rhodes was confronted by World Heavyweight Champion Seth Rollins, setting up the men's WWE Crown Jewel Championship match at Crown Jewel, which WWE Chief Content Officer Paul "Triple H" Levesque subsequently confirmed.

With the scheduling of a Wrestlepalooza for December 2026, this established the event as an annual PLE for WWE.

=== Raw ===
Undisputed WWE Champion and defending Crown Jewel Champion Cody Rhodes opened the subsequent episode of Raw, only to be interrupted by his Crown Jewel opponent World Heavyweight Champion Seth Rollins, accompanied by his Vision stablemates (Bron Breakker, Bronson Reed, and Paul Heyman). In the ring they talked about their shared history, including their past feud in 2022, their alliance at WrestleMania XL, and Rhodes' undefeated record against Rollins. After their confrontation, as Rhodes was leaving, he was confronted on the entrance ramp by The Vision, but was left untouched.

Jey Uso would defeat LA Knight following a distraction from The Vision. The Vision would attack Knight post-match much to Jey's indifference, leading to Jimmy Uso making the save. The Usos would defeat Breakker and Reed a week later in a tornado tag team match following interference from their cousin, the returning Roman Reigns.

New Women's World Champion Stephanie Vaquer thanked the fans for their support. Raw General Manager Adam Pearce subsequently announced that she would face the WWE Women's Champion, later confirmed to be Tiffany Stratton, for the WWE Women's Crown Jewel Championship at Crown Jewel.

=== SmackDown ===
Paul Heyman opened the subsequent episode of SmackDown, only to be interrupted by Undisputed WWE Champion Cody Rhodes. After a back and forth on the mic, Heyman's Vision stablemates Bron Breakker and Bronson Reed appeared and attacked Rhodes, only for Randy Orton to make the save.

Drew McIntyre ranted about his loss to Cody Rhodes, only to be attacked by Jacob Fatu. McIntyre resumed his feud with Rhodes on the October 17 episode of SmackDown, where he denied attacking Fatu backstage. Rhodes challenged McIntyre to an impromptu match which McIntyre won via disqualification when Rhodes struck McIntyre with the title belt. After the match, the two brawled. A championship rematch between Rhodes and McIntyre was later scheduled for Saturday Night's Main Event XLI.

=== Broadcasting changes ===
This would be the only Wrestlepalooza to air on Disney+ in the Philippines and Abema in Japan before moving to Netflix on January 1 and October 1, 2026, respectively. Throughout 2025, many of the select few countries that were still on the WWE Network due to pre-existing contracts gradually merged to Netflix with nearly all international markets on Netflix by January 1, 2026. The last few remaining countries that were still on the WWE Network merged under Netflix on April 1, 2026, making this 2025 event the only Wrestlepalooza to air on the WWE Network in any country.

== Results ==
No.	Results	Stipulations	Times
1	Brock Lesnar defeated John Cena by pinfall	Singles match	8:50
2	The Vision (Bronson Reed and Bron Breakker) (with Paul Heyman) defeated The Usos (Jey Uso and Jimmy Uso) by pinfall	Tag team match LA Knight was the special guest referee.	17:12
3	Stephanie Vaquer defeated Iyo Sky by pinfall	Singles match for the vacant Women's World Championship	20:11
4	CM Punk and AJ Lee defeated Seth Rollins and Becky Lynch by submission	Mixed tag team match	29:18
5	Cody Rhodes (c) defeated Drew McIntyre by pinfall	Singles match for the Undisputed WWE Championship	17:17
(c) / – the champion(s) heading into the match
