= 2000 in professional wrestling =

2000 in professional wrestling describes the year's events in the world of professional wrestling.

== List of notable promotions ==
These promotions held notable events in 2000.

Promotion Name	Abbreviation	Notes
Consejo Mundial de Lucha Libre	CMLL	
Extreme Championship Wrestling	ECW	
Frontier Martial-Arts Wrestling	FMW	
i-Generation Superstars of Wrestling	i-Gen	
Lucha Libre AAA Worldwide	AAA	The "AAA" abbreviation has been used since the mid-1990s and had previously stood for the promotion's original name Asistencia Asesoría y Administración.
New Japan Pro-Wrestling	NJPW	
World Championship Wrestling	WCW	
World Wrestling Council	WWC	
World Wrestling Federation	WWF	
World Xtreme Wrestling	WXW	

== Calendar of notable shows ==
=== January ===
Date	Promotion(s)	Event	Location	Main Event
January 4	NJPW	Wrestling World 2000	Tokyo, Japan	Kensuke Sasaki defeated Genichiro Tenryu (c) in a Singles match for the IWGP Heavyweight Championship
January 5	FMW	New Year Generation 2000: Day 1	Tokyo, Japan	Masato Tanaka vs. Tetsuhiro Kuroda in a Singles match
January 9	ECW	Guilty as Charged	Birmingham, Alabama	Mike Awesome (c) defeated Spike Dudley in a Singles match for the ECW World Heavyweight Championship
January 16	WCW	Souled Out	Cincinnati, Ohio	Chris Benoit defeated Sid Vicious in a Singles match for the vacant WCW World Heavyweight Championship with Arn Anderson as special guest referee
January 23	WWF	Royal Rumble	New York, New York	The Rock won by last eliminating Big Show in a 30-man Royal Rumble match for a WWF Championship match at WrestleMania 2000
(c) – denotes defending champion(s)

=== February ===
Date	Promotion(s)	Event	Location	Main Event
February 20	WCW	SuperBrawl 2000	San Francisco, California	Sid Vicious (c) defeated Scott Hall and Jeff Jarrett in a Three Way Dance for the WCW World Heavyweight Championship
February 25	FMW	Cluster Battle 2000: Day 5	Tokyo, Japan	H and Mr. Gannosuke vs. Kodo Fuyuki and Kyoko Inoue in a tag team match
February 27	WWF	No Way Out	Hartford, Connecticut	Triple H (c) defeated Cactus Jack in a Hell in a Cell Title vs. Career match for the WWF Championship
(c) – denotes defending champion(s)

=== March ===
Date	Promotion(s)	Event	Location	Main Event
March 5	AAA	Rey de Reyes	Naucalpan, Mexico	La Parka Jr. defeated Gigante Drako in a Lucha de Apuesta, mask vs. mask match
March 11	N/A	Second Annual Rikidozan Memorial Show	Yokohama, Japan	Genichiro Tenryu (WAR) and BB Jones defeated Shinya Hashimoto and Naoya Ogawa in a tag team match
March 12	ECW	Living Dangerously	Danbury, Connecticut	Super Crazy defeated Rhino in a Tournament final for the vacant ECW World Television Championship
March 17	CMLL	Juicio Final	Mexico City, Mexico	Atlantis defeated Villano III in a Lucha de Apuesta, Mask vs. Mask match
March 19	WCW	Uncensored	Miami, Florida	Hulk Hogan defeated Ric Flair in a Yappapi Indian Strap match
March 27	FMW	Winning Road 2000: Day 1	Tokyo, Japan	Tetsuhiro Kuroda vs. Kodo Fuyuki in a Singles match
(c) – denotes defending champion(s)

=== April ===
Date	Promotion(s)	Event	Location	Main Event
April 2	WWF	WrestleMania 2000	Anaheim, California	Triple H (c) defeated The Rock, Mick Foley and Big Show in a Fatal 4-Way elimination match for the WWF Championship
April 11	FMW	Winning Road 2000: Day 11	Tokyo, Japan	H and Mr. Gannosuke vs. Masato Tanaka and Balls Mahoney in a tag team match
April 14	CMLL	44. Aniversario de Arena México	Mexico City, Mexico	Perro Aguayo defeated Bestia Salvaje in a Best two-out-of-three falls Lucha de Apuestas hair vs. hair match
April 16	ECW	Wrestlepalooza	St. Charles, Missouri	Tommy Dreamer, The Sandman and New Jack defeated The Network (Steve Corino, Jack Victory and Yoshihiro Tajiri) in a street fight
April 16	WCW	Spring Stampede	Chicago, Illinois	Jeff Jarrett defeated Diamond Dallas Page in a Singles match for the vacant WCW World Heavyweight Championship
April 16	WXW	Gary Albright Memorial Show	Allentown, Pennsylvania	Rikishi Phatu defeated The Road Dogg in a Singles match
April 22	ECW	CyberSlam	Philadelphia, Pennsylvania	Justin Credible defeated Tommy Dreamer (c) in a Singles match for the ECW World Heavyweight Championship
April 30	WWF	Backlash	Washington, D.C.	The Rock defeated Triple H (c) in a Singles match for the WWF Championship with Shane McMahon as special guest referee
(c) – denotes defending champion(s)

=== May ===
Date	Promotion(s)	Event	Location	Main Event
May 5	FMW	FMW 11th Anniversary Show	Tokyo, Japan	Hayabusa defeated Masato Tanaka in a Singles match
May 5	NJPW	Wrestling Dontaku	Fukuoka, Japan	Power Warrior (c) defeated The Great Muta in a Singles match for the IWGP Heavyweight Championship
May 6	WWF	Insurrextion	London, England	The Rock (c) defeated Triple H and Shane McMahon in a Triple Threat match for the WWF Championship
May 7	WCW	Slamboree	Kansas City, Missouri	Jeff Jarrett defeated David Arquette (c) and Diamond Dallas Page in a Ready to Rumble Cage match for the WCW World Heavyweight Championship
May 14	ECW	Hardcore Heaven	Milwaukee, Wisconsin	Justin Credible (c) defeated Lance Storm in a Singles match for the ECW World Heavyweight Championship
May 21	WWF	Judgment Day	Louisville, Kentucky	Triple H defeated The Rock (c) 6–5 in a 60-minute Iron Man match for the WWF Championship with Shawn Michaels as special guest referee
May 25	N/A	Third Annual Brian Pillman Memorial Show	Cincinnati, Ohio	D'Lo Brown and Eddie Guerrero defeated Perry Saturn and Dean Malenko in a tag team match
(c) – denotes defending champion(s)

=== June ===
Date	Promotion(s)	Event	Location	Main Event
June 11	WCW	The Great American Bash	Baltimore, Maryland	Jeff Jarrett (c) defeated Kevin Nash in a Singles match for the WCW World Heavyweight Championship with Ernest Miller as special guest enforcer
June 16	FMW	Neo 2000: Day 14	Tokyo, Japan	Darkside of H and "Hayabusa" vs. Kodo Fuyuki and GOEMON
June 23	ECW	Midwest Massacre Tour I	Milwaukee, Wisconsin	Rhino (c) defeated Rob Van Dam by disqualification in a singles match for the ECW World Television Championship
June 24	ECW	Midwest Massacre Tour II	Villa Park, Illinois	Rob Van Dam defeated Little Guido in a singles match
June 25	WWF	King of the Ring	Boston, Massachusetts	The Rock and The Brothers of Destruction (Kane and The Undertaker) defeated The McMahon-Helmsley Faction (Mr. McMahon, Shane McMahon and Triple H (c)) in a Six-man tag team match for the WWF Championship
(c) – denotes defending champion(s)

=== July ===
Date	Promotion(s)	Event	Location	Main Event
July 5	AAA	Triplemanía VIII	Tokyo, Japan	Octagón, Jushin Thunder Liger, Latin Lover, and Hector Garza defeated Cibernético, Shiima Nobunaga, Abismo Negro, and Electroshock in an Eight-man "Atómicos" tag team match
July 9	WCW	Bash at the Beach	Daytona Beach, Florida	Booker T defeated Jeff Jarrett (c) in a Singles match for the WCW World Heavyweight Championship
July 16	ECW	Heat Wave	Los Angeles, California	Justin Credible (c) defeated Tommy Dreamer in a Stairway to Hell match for the ECW World Heavyweight Championship
July 16	WWC	WWC 27th Aniversario	Caguas, Puerto Rico	Thunder and Lightning defeated The Pitbulls (#1 and #2) in a tag team match
July 23	WWF	Fully Loaded	Dallas, Texas	The Rock (c) defeated Chris Benoit in a Singles match for the WWF Championship
July 28	FMW	King of Fight 2000 II: Day 9	Tokyo, Japan	Hayabusa, Masato Tanaka and Hisakatsu Oya vs. Kodo Fuyuki, Jinsei Shinzaki and Mr. Gannosuke in a tag team match
July 30	i-Gen	i-Generation Superstars of Wrestling	Sydney, Australia	Curt Hennig (c) defeated Dennis Rodman by disqualification in an Australian Outback match for the i-Generation World Heavyweight Championship
(c) – denotes defending champion(s)

=== August ===
Date	Promotion(s)	Event	Location	Main Event
August 7–13	NJPW	G1 Climax	Tokyo	Kensuke Sasaki defeated Manabu Nakanishi by submission in a G1 Climax tournament final
August 13	WCW	New Blood Rising	Vancouver, British Columbia	Booker T (c) defeated Jeff Jarrett in a Singles match for the WCW World Heavyweight Championship
August 19	ECW	A New Era Begins	Philadelphia, Pennsylvania	Rob Van Dam and Kid Kash defeated Justin Credible and Rhino in a tag team match
August 25	ECW	Mid-town Massacre Tour I	New York, New York	Unholy Alliance (Mikey Whipwreck and Yoshihiro Tajiri) defeated Jerry Lynn and Tommy Dreamer and Simon and Swinger in a Three way dance for the vacant ECW World Tag Team Championship
August 26	ECW	Mid-town Massacre Tour II	New York, New York	Kid Kash defeated Rhino (c) by pinfall in a Singles match for the ECW World Television Championship
August 27	WWF	SummerSlam	Raleigh, North Carolina	The Rock (c) defeated Triple H and Kurt Angle in a Triple threat match for the WWF Championship
August 28	FMW	Super Dynamism 2000: Day 4	Tokyo, Japan	Hayabusa vs. Mr. Gannosuke
(c) – denotes defending champion(s)

=== September ===
Date	Promotion(s)	Event	Location	Main Event
September 17	WCW	Fall Brawl	Buffalo, New York	Booker T defeated Kevin Nash (c) in a Caged Heat match for the WCW World Heavyweight Championship
September 24	WWF	Unforgiven	Philadelphia, Pennsylvania	The Rock (c) defeated Chris Benoit, Kane and The Undertaker in a Fatal 4-Way match for the WWF Championship
September 26	FMW	Flashover 2000: Day 8	Tokyo, Japan	Kodo Fuyuki vs. Hayabusa
September 29	AAA	Verano de Escándalo	Ciudad Madero, Mexico	Heavy Metal and Perro Aguayo Jr. defeated Latin Lover and Héctor Garza by disqualification in a tag team match
September 29	CMLL	CMLL 67th Anniversary Show	Mexico City, Mexico	Negro Casas defeated Dr. Wagner Jr. in a Best two-out-of-three falls match: 2000 Leyenda de Plata tournament semi-final
(c) – denotes defending champion(s)

=== October ===
Date	Promotion(s)	Event	Location	Main Event
October 1	ECW	Anarchy Rulz	Saint Paul, Minnesota	Jerry Lynn defeated Justin Credible (c) in a Singles match for the ECW World Heavyweight Championship
October 7	ECW	Beer, Blood, Babes and Barbed Wire	Milwaukee, Wisconsin	Rob Van Dam defeated E. Z. Money in a Singles match
October 22	WWF	No Mercy	Albany, New York	Kurt Angle defeated The Rock (c) in a No Disqualification match for the WWF Championship
October 29	FMW	Power Splash 2000: Day 11	Tokyo, Japan	Hayabusa and Onryo vs. Kodo Fuyuki and GOEMON
October 29	WCW	Halloween Havoc	Paradise, Nevada	Goldberg defeated KroniK (Brian Adams and Bryan Clark) in a Handicap Elimination match
(c) – denotes defending champion(s)

=== November ===
Date	Promotion(s)	Event	Location	Main Event
November 5	ECW	November to Remember	Villa Park, Illinois	Steve Corino defeated Justin Credible, The Sandman and Jerry Lynn (c) in a Double Jeopardy match for the ECW World Heavyweight Championship
November 12	FMW	Deep Throat	Yokohama, Japan	Kodo Fuyuki (c) defeated Hayabusa in a Singles match for the WEW World Heavyweight Championship
November 16	WCW	Millennium Final	Oberhausen, Germany	Sting defeated Kevin Nash in a Singles match for the WCW European Cup with Axel Schulz as special guest referee
November 19	WWF	Survivor Series	Tampa, Florida	Stone Cold Steve Austin vs. Triple H ended in a no contest in a No Disqualification match
November 26	WCW	Mayhem	Milwaukee, Wisconsin	Scott Steiner defeated Booker T (c) by submission in a Straitjacket steel cage match for the WCW World Heavyweight Championship
November 28	FMW	Scramble Survivor 2000: Day 8	Tokyo, Japan	Kodo Fuyuki, Kintaro Kanemura and Tetsuhiro Kuroda vs. Complete Players (Masato Tanaka, Jado and Gedo)
(c) – denotes defending champion(s)

=== December ===
Date	Promotion(s)	Event	Location	Main Event
December 2	WWF	Rebellion	Sheffield, England	Kurt Angle (c) defeated Rikishi, The Rock and Stone Cold Steve Austin in a Fatal 4-Way match for the WWF Championship
December 3	ECW	Massacre on 34th Street	New York, New York	Steve Corino (c) defeated Jerry Lynn and Justin Credible in a Three-Way Dance for the ECW World Heavyweight Championship
December 8	AAA	Guerra de Titanes	Ciudad Madero, Mexico	Héctor Garza and Latin Lover defeated Heavy Metal and Perro Aguayo Jr. in an "Extreme" steel cage match
December 10	FMW	Year End Sensation 2000: Day 4	Tokyo, Japan	Masato Tanaka, Jado, Gedo and Kaori Nakayama defeated Kodo Fuyuki, Tetsuhiro Kuroda, Kintaro Kanemura, and Azusa Kudo)
December 10	WWF	Armageddon	Birmingham, Alabama	Kurt Angle (c) defeated The Rock, Stone Cold Steve Austin, Triple H, The Undertaker and Rikishi in a Six-Man Hell in a Cell match for the WWF Championship
December 15	CMLL	Sin Piedad	Mexico City, Mexico	Perro Aguayo defeated Cien Caras in a Best two-out-of-three falls Lucha de Apuestas hair vs. hair match
December 17	WCW	Starrcade	Washington, D.C.	Scott Steiner (c) defeated Sid Vicious by submission in a Singles match for the WCW World Heavyweight Championship
December 20	FMW	Year End Sensation 2000: Day 6	Tokyo, Japan	Kodo Fuyuki, Kintaro Kanemura and Tetsuhiro Kuroda vs. Complete Players (Masato Tanaka, Jado and Gedo)
December 23	ECW	Holiday Hell	Philadelphia, Pennsylvania	Steve Corino (c) defeated Justin Credible and the Sandman by pinfall
(c) – denotes defending champion(s)

== Accomplishments and tournaments ==
=== AAA ===
Tournaments	Winner	Date won	Notes
Rey de Reyes	Abismo Negro	March 5	

=== AJW ===
Accomplishment	Winner	Date won	Notes
Japan Grand Prix 2000	Kaoru Ito	August 20	
Rookie of the Year Decision Tournament	Mika Nishio		
Tag League The Best 2000	Etsuko Mita and Mima Shimoda	December 23	

=== AJPW ===
Accomplishment	Winner	Date won	Notes
Asunaro Cup 2000	Yoshinobu Kanemaru	January 22	

=== ECW ===
Tournaments	Winner	Date won	Notes
ECW World Television Championship Tournament	Super Crazy	March 12	
ECW World Tag Team Championship Tournament	Unholy Alliance (Yoshihiro Tajiri and Mikey Whipwreck)	August 25	

=== WCW ===
Accomplishment	Winner	Date won	Notes
WCW World Tag Team Championship Tournament	David Flair and Crowbar	January 3	
WCW Cruiserweight Championship Tournament	TAFKA Prince Iaukea	February 20	
WCW World Heavyweight Championship Tournament	Jeff Jarrett	April 16	
WCW United States Championship Tournament	Scott Steiner	April 16	
WCW World Tag Team Championship Tournament	Shane Douglas and Buff Bagwell	April 16	
WCW United States Championship Tournament	Lance Storm	July 18	
WCW Hardcore Championship Tournament	Reno	October 2	
London Lethal Lottery Tag Team Tournament	Scott Steiner and Sting	November 10	
European Cup Tournament	Sting	November 16	

=== WWF ===
Accomplishment	Winner	Date won	Notes
Royal Rumble	The Rock	January 23	Last eliminated the Big Show to win a WWF Championship match at WrestleMania 2000, but was unsuccessful in winning the title.
King of the Ring	Kurt Angle	June 25	Defeated Rikishi in the tournament final to win and be crowned King of the Ring.

== Awards and honors ==
=== Pro Wrestling Illustrated ===
Category	Winner
PWI Wrestler of the Year	The Rock
PWI Tag Team of the Year	The Hardy Boyz (Matt and Jeff Hardy)
PWI Match of the Year	The Dudley Boyz vs. The Hardy Boyz vs. Edge and Christian (WrestleMania 2000)
PWI Feud of the Year	Triple H vs. Kurt Angle
PWI Most Popular Wrestler of the Year	The Rock
PWI Most Hated Wrestler of the Year	Kurt Angle
PWI Comeback of the Year	Rikishi Phatu
PWI Most Improved Wrestler of the Year	Steve Corino
PWI Most Inspirational Wrestler of the Year	Booker T
PWI Rookie of the Year	Kurt Angle
PWI Woman of the Year	Stephanie McMahon
PWI Editor's Award	Freddie Blassie

=== Wrestling Observer Newsletter ===
==== Wrestling Observer Newsletter Hall of Fame ====
Inductee
Stone Cold Steve Austin
Mick Foley
Shinya Hashimoto
Akira Hokuto
Bill Longson
Frank Sexton
Sándor Szabó

==== Wrestling Observer Newsletter awards ====
Category	Winner
Wrestler of the Year	Triple H
Most Outstanding	Chris Benoit
Best Box Office Draw	The Rock
Feud of the Year	Mick Foley vs. Triple H
Tag Team of the Year	Edge and Christian
Most Improved	Kurt Angle
Best on Interviews	The Rock

== Title changes ==
=== ECW ===
ECW World Heavyweight Championship
Incoming champion – Mike Awesome
Date	Winner	Event/Show	Note(s)
April 13	Taz	ECW on TNN	Taz had signed with the World Wrestling Federation following his title loss to Mike Awesome on September 19, 1999. However, Awesome unexpectedly signed with World Championship Wrestling in 2000 while still being champion and threatened to bring the title onto WCW TV. As a result, Paul Heyman and Vince McMahon arranged for Taz to return to ECW and defeat Awesome for the title.
April 22	Tommy Dreamer	CyberSlam	
April 22	Justin Credible	CyberSlam	Credible threw down his half of the ECW World Tag Team Championships to challenge Dreamer
October 1	Jerry Lynn	Anarchy Rulz	
November 5	Steve Corino	November to Remember	This was a Double Jeopardy match also involving Justin Credible and The Sandman.

ECW World Television Championship
Incoming champion – Rob Van Dam
Date	Winner	Event/Show	Note(s)
March 4	Vacant	—N/a	Vacated due to injury
March 12	Super Crazy	Living Dangerously	
April 8	Tajiri	ECW on TNN	
April 22	Rhino	CyberSlam	
August 26	Kid Kash	ECW on TNN	
September 9	Rhino	ECW on TNN	

ECW World Tag Team Championship
Incoming champions – Tommy Dreamer and Raven
Date	Winner	Event/Show	Note(s)
January 9	Impact Players (Justin Credible and Lance Storm)	Guilty as Charged	
February 26	Tommy Dreamer and Masato Tanaka	Hardcore TV #358	
March 4	Mike Awesome and Raven	ECW on TNN	
March 12	Impact Players (Justin Credible and Lance Storm)	Living Dangerously	
April 22	Vacant	CyberSlam	
August 25	Unholy Alliance (Yoshihiro Tajiri and Mikey Whipwreck)	ECW on TNN	
August 26	Full Blooded Italians (Little Guido and Tracy Smothers)	ECW on TNN	
December 3	Danny Doring and Roadkill	Massacre on 34th Street	

=== NJPW ===
IWGP Heavyweight Championship
Incoming champion – Genichiro Tenryu
Date	Winner	Event/Show	Note(s)
January 4	Kensuke Sasaki	Wrestling World 2000	
October 9	Vacant	—N/a	

IWGP Tag Team Championship
Incoming champions – Manabu Nakanishi and Yuji Nagata
Date	Winner	Event/Show	Note(s)
July 20	Tencozy (Hiroyoshi Tenzan and Satoshi Kojima)	—N/a	

IWGP Junior Heavyweight Championship
Incoming champion – Jushin Thunder Liger
Date	Winner	Event/Show	Note(s)
July 20	Tatsuhito Takaiwa	Summer Struggle 2000	
October 29	Minoru Tanaka	Get a Right!!	

IWGP Junior Heavyweight Tag Team Championship
Incoming champions – Shinjiro Otani and Tatsuhito Takaiwa
Date	Winner	Event/Show	Note(s)
June 25	Koji Kanemoto and Minoru Tanaka	Summer Struggle 2000	

=== WCW ===
WCW World Heavyweight Championship
Incoming champion – Bret Hart
Date	Winner	Event/Show	Note(s)
January 16	Vacant	Souled Out	Bret Hart vacated the title when he was forced to withdraw from the main event of WCW's Souled Out due to his injuries
January 16	Chris Benoit	Souled Out	Defeated Sid Vicious in a Singles match for the vacant WCW World Heavyweight Championship with Arn Anderson as special guest referee
January 17	Vacant	Nitro	Vacated when Benoit left the company due to disagreements Due to the circumstances surrounding Benoit's departure WCW refused to acknowledge Benoit's victory as an official title reign, and Benoit's title reign was not listed in the title lineage at WCW.com. However, the WWF recognized Benoit's title win, and Benoit's title reign is still listed in the title lineage at WWE.com. Benoit spent the next few weeks in Japan before heading to the WWF, who acknowledged his WCW World Heavyweight Championship win and presented him as a former world champion.
January 24	Sid Vicious	Nitro	Defeated Kevin Nash in a Singles match for the vacant WCW World Heavyweight Championship
January 25	Vacant	Thunder	Nash stripped Sid of the championship
January 25	Kevin Nash	Thunder	Defeated Sid Vicious in a Singles match for the vacant WCW World Heavyweight Championship
January 25	Sid Vicious	Thunder	
April 10	Vacant	Nitro	When WCW began its New Blood angle, Sid (along with all the other WCW champions at the time) was stripped of his championship
April 16	Jeff Jarrett	Spring Stampede	Defeated Diamond Dallas Page to win the vacant WCW World Heavyweight Championship
April 24	Diamond Dallas Page	Nitro	
April 25	David Arquette	Thunder	
May 7	Jeff Jarrett	Slamboree	
May 15	Ric Flair	Nitro	
May 22	Vacant	Nitro	
May 22	Jeff Jarrett	Nitro	
May 23	Kevin Nash	Thunder	
May 29	Ric Flair	Nitro	
May 29	Jeff Jarrett	Nitro	
July 9	Booker T	Bash at the Beach	
August 28	Kevin Nash	Nitro	
September 17	Booker T	Fall Brawl	
September 25	Vince Russo	Nitro	
October 2	Vacant	Nitro	
October 2	Booker T	Nitro	
November 26	Scott Steiner	Mayhem	

WCW Cruiserweight Championship
Incoming champion – Madusa
Date	Winner	Event/Show	Note(s)
January 16	Oklahoma	Souled Out	
January 18	Vacant	Thunder	
February 20	The Artist	SuperBrawl 2000	
March 30	Billy Kidman	House show	
March 31	The Artist	House show	
April 10	Vacant	Nitro	
April 16	Chris Candido	Spring Stampede	
May 15	Crowbar and Daffney	Nitro	
May 22	Daffney	Nitro	
June 6	Lieutenant Loco	Thunder	
July 31	Lance Storm	Nitro	
August 14	Elix Skipper	Nitro	
October 2	Mike Sanders	Nitro	
December 4	Chavo Guerrero Jr.	Thunder	

WCW United States Heavyweight Championship
Incoming champion – Jeff Jarrett
Date	Winner	Event/Show	Note(s)
January 16	Vacant	Souled Out	Vacated due to injury
January 17	Jeff Jarrett	Nitro	
April 10	Vacant	Nitro	
April 16	Scott Steiner	Spring Stampede	
July 9	Vacant	Bash at the Beach	
July 18	Lance Storm	Nitro	
September 22	Terry Funk	House show	
September 23	Lance Storm	House show	
October 29	General Rection	Halloween Havoc	
November 13	Lance Storm	Nitro	
November 26	General Rection	Mayhem	

WCW Hardcore Championship
Incoming champion – Norman Smiley
Date	Winner	Event/Show	Note(s)
January 12	Brian Knobs	Thunder	
February 7	Bam Bam Bigelow	Nitro	
February 20	Brian Knobs	SuperBrawl 2000	
February 28	Shane Helms, Evan Karagias and Shannon Moore	Nitro	
March 19	Brian Knobs	Uncensored	
April 10	Vacant	Nitro	
April 16	Terry Funk	Spring Stampede	
May 22	Shane Douglas	Nitro	
May 23	Terry Funk	Thunder	
June 5	Eric Bischoff	Nitro	
June 6	Big Vito and Johnny the Bull	Thunder	
June 19	Big Vito	Nitro	
July 24	Lance Storm	Nitro	
August 14	Carl Ouellet	Nitro	
August 14	Norman Smiley	Nitro	
September 25	Vacant	Nitro	
October 2	Reno	Nitro	
November 8	Crowbar	Thunder	
December 17	Terry Funk	Starrcade	

WCW World Television Championship
Incoming champion – Vacant
Date	Winner	Event/Show	Note(s)
February 16	Jim Duggan	Saturday Night	
April 10	Retired	Nitro	

WCW World Tag Team Championship
Incoming champions – Vacant
Date	Winner	Event/Show	Note(s)
January 3	David Flair and Crowbar	Nitro	
January 18	The Mamalukes (Big Vito and Johnny the Bull)	Thunder	
February 12	The Harris Brothers (Ron and Don Harris)	House show	
February 13	The Mamalukes (Big Vito and Johnny the Bull)	House show	
March 19	The Harris Brothers (Ron and Don Harris)	Uncensored	
April 10	Vacant	Nitro	
April 16	Shane Douglas and Buff Bagwell	Spring Stampede	
May 15	KroniK (Brian Adams and Bryan Clark)	Nitro	
May 30	Perfect Event (Shawn Stasiak and Chuck Palumbo)	Thunder	
July 9	KroniK (Brian Adams and Bryan Clark)	Bash at the Beach	
August 13	Dark Carnival (The Great Muta and Vampiro)	New Blood Rising	
August 14	The Filthy Animals (Rey Misterio Jr. and Juventud Guerrera)	Nitro	
September 18	Vacant	Nitro	
September 25	Sean O'Haire and Mark Jindrak	Nitro	
October 9	Misfits in Action (Lieutenant Loco and Corporal Cajun)	Thunder	
October 9	Sean O'Haire and Mark Jindrak	Thunder	
November 16	The Boogie Knights (Alex Wright and Disco Inferno)	Millennium Final	
November 20	Perfect Event (Shawn Stasiak and Chuck Palumbo)	Nitro	
November 26	The Insiders (Diamond Dallas Page and Kevin Nash)	Mayhem	
December 4	Perfect Event (Shawn Stasiak and Chuck Palumbo)	Nitro	
December 17	The Insiders (Diamond Dallas Page and Kevin Nash)	Starrcade	

=== WWF ===
WWF Championship
Incoming champion – Big Show
Date	Winner	Event/Show	Note(s)
January 3	Triple H	Raw Is War	
April 30	The Rock	Backlash	
May 21	Triple H	Judgment Day	
June 25	The Rock	King of the Ring	
October 22	Kurt Angle	No Mercy	

WWF Intercontinental Championship
Incoming champion – Chris Jericho
Date	Winner	Event/Show	Note(s)
January 3	Chris Jericho and Chyna	Raw Is War	
January 23	Chris Jericho	Royal Rumble	
February 27	Kurt Angle	No Way Out	
April 2	Chris Benoit	WrestleMania 2000	
May 2	Chris Jericho	SmackDown!	
May 8	Chris Benoit	Raw Is War	
June 20	Rikishi	SmackDown!	
July 4	Val Venis	SmackDown!	
August 27	Chyna	SummerSlam	
September 4	Eddie Guerrero	Raw Is War	
November 21	Billy Gunn	SmackDown!	
December 10	Chris Benoit	Armageddon	

WWF Light Heavyweight Championship
Incoming champion – Gillberg
Date	Winner	Event/Show	Note(s)
February 8	Essa Rios	Sunday Night Heat	
March 13	Dean Malenko	Raw Is War	
April 17	Scotty 2 Hotty	Raw Is War	
April 25	Dean Malenko	SmackDown!	

WWF Women's Championship
Incoming champion – The Kat
Date	Winner	Event/Show	Note(s)
January 31	Hervina	Raw Is War	
February 1	Jacqueline	SmackDown!	
March 28	Stephanie McMahon-Helmsley	SmackDown!	
August 21	Lita	Raw Is War	
October 31	Ivory	SmackDown!	

WWF European Championship
Incoming champion – Val Venis
Date	Winner	Event/Show	Note(s)
February 8	Kurt Angle	SmackDown!	
April 2	Chris Jericho	WrestleMania 2000	
April 3	Eddie Guerrero	Raw Is War	
July 23	Perry Saturn	Fully Loaded	
August 29	Al Snow	SmackDown!	
October 16	William Regal	Raw Is War	
December 2	Crash Holly	Rebellion	
December 4	William Regal	Raw Is War	

WWF Tag Team Championship
Incoming champions – The New Age Outlaws (Billy Gunn and Road Dogg)
Date	Winner	Event/Show	Note(s)
February 27	The Dudley Boyz (Bubba Ray and D-Von Dudley)	No Way Out	
April 2	Edge and Christian	WrestleMania 2000	
May 29	Too Cool (Grand Master Sexay and Scotty 2 Hotty)	Raw Is War	
June 25	Edge and Christian	King of the Ring	
September 24	The Hardy Boyz (Matt and Jeff Hardy)	Unforgiven	
October 22	Edge and Christian	No Mercy	
October 23	The Hardy Boyz (Matt and Jeff Hardy)	Raw Is War	
November 6	Right to Censor (Bull Buchanan and The Goodfather)	Raw Is War	
December 10	Edge and Christian	Armageddon	
December 18	The Rock and The Undertaker	Raw Is War	
December 19	Edge and Christian	SmackDown!	

WWF Hardcore Championship
Incoming champion – Big Boss Man
Date	Winner	Event/Show	Note(s)
January 17	Test	Raw Is War	
February 22	Crash Holly	SmackDown!	
March 13	Pete Gas	Raw Is War	
March 13	Crash Holly	Raw Is War	
April 2	Tazz	WrestleMania 2000	
April 2	Viscera	WrestleMania 2000	
April 2	Funaki	WrestleMania 2000	
April 2	Rodney	WrestleMania 2000	
April 2	Joey Abs	WrestleMania 2000	
April 2	Thrasher	WrestleMania 2000	
April 2	Pete Gas	WrestleMania 2000	
April 2	Tazz	WrestleMania 2000	
April 2	Crash Holly	WrestleMania 2000	
April 2	Hardcore Holly	WrestleMania 2000	
April 3	Crash Holly	Raw is War	
April 11	Perry Saturn	SmackDown!	
April 11	Tazz	SmackDown!	
April 11	Crash Holly	SmackDown!	
April 24	Matt Hardy	Raw Is War	
April 25	Crash Holly	SmackDown!	
May 6	The British Bulldog	Insurrextion	
May 11	Crash Holly	SmackDown!	
May 15	Godfather's Ho	Raw Is War	
May 15	Crash Holly	Raw Is War	
May 18	Gerald Brisco	SmackDown!	
June 12	Crash Holly	Raw Is War	
June 19	Gerald Brisco	Raw Is War	
June 19	Pat Patterson	Raw Is War	
June 25	Crash Holly	King of the Ring	
June 27	Steve Blackman	SmackDown!	
July 2	Crash Holly	House show	
July 2	Steve Blackman	House show	
August 21	Shane McMahon	Raw Is War	
August 27	Steve Blackman	SummerSlam	
September 24	Crash Holly	Unforgiven	
September 24	Perry Saturn	Unforgiven	
September 24	Steve Blackman	Unforgiven	
December 22	Raven	Raw Is War	

== Births ==
- February 11 – Ryuki Honda
- February 16 – Tetsuya Izuchi
- February 25 – Daniel Benoit, son of Nancy and Chris Benoit (d. 2007)
- March 8 – Peter Tihanyi
- March 22 – Momo Watanabe
- April 14
  - Charlette Renegade
  - Robyn Renegade
- April 28 – Ricky Smokes
- April 30 - Saquon Shugars
- May 16 - Akira Kurogane
- May 17 – Misa Matsui
- May 31 – Gable Stevenson
- June 20 – Sayaka Kurara
- June 29 - Carlee Bright
- August 12 – Yu Owada
- August 19 - Jack Cartwheel
- September 14 – Hanako
- September 27 – Titus Alexander
- October 29 – Takuro Niki
- December 1 – Maya Fukuda

== Debuts ==
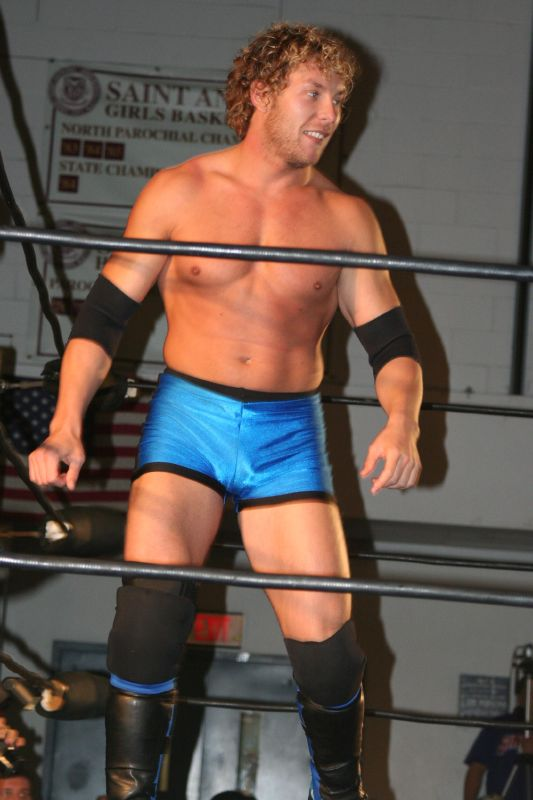
Kenny Omega

- Uncertain debut date

- Jack Evans
- Nattie Neidhart
- Tank Toland
- Shelly Martinez
- Eric Angle
- Chie Terashita (All Japan Women's)

- January 22 - Josh Wilcox
- February – Kenny Omega
- March 15 - Leon
- March 18 - Randy Orton
- March 19 – Trish Stratus
- March 24 - Roderick Strong
- April 14 - Tomohiko Hashimoto
- April 24 – David Arquette
- May 7 – Kevin Steen and Ralphus (WCW)
- May 20
  - Jay Briscoe
  - Mark Briscoe
- May 24 - Kenta Kobayashi
- July – Lance Archer
- July 4 - Santos Escobar
- September 7 – Yoshihito Sasaki
- September 29 - Alberto Del Rio
- September 30 - Mika Nishio (All Japan Women's)
- October 7 – The Great Khali
- October 20 – Matt Sydal
- November 6 - Chris Sabin
- November 11 – Austin Aries
- November 12 - Tadanobu Fujisawa
- November 19 – Yasu Urano
- December 3 – Yuu Yamagata
- December 26 - Scotty Mac

== Retirements ==
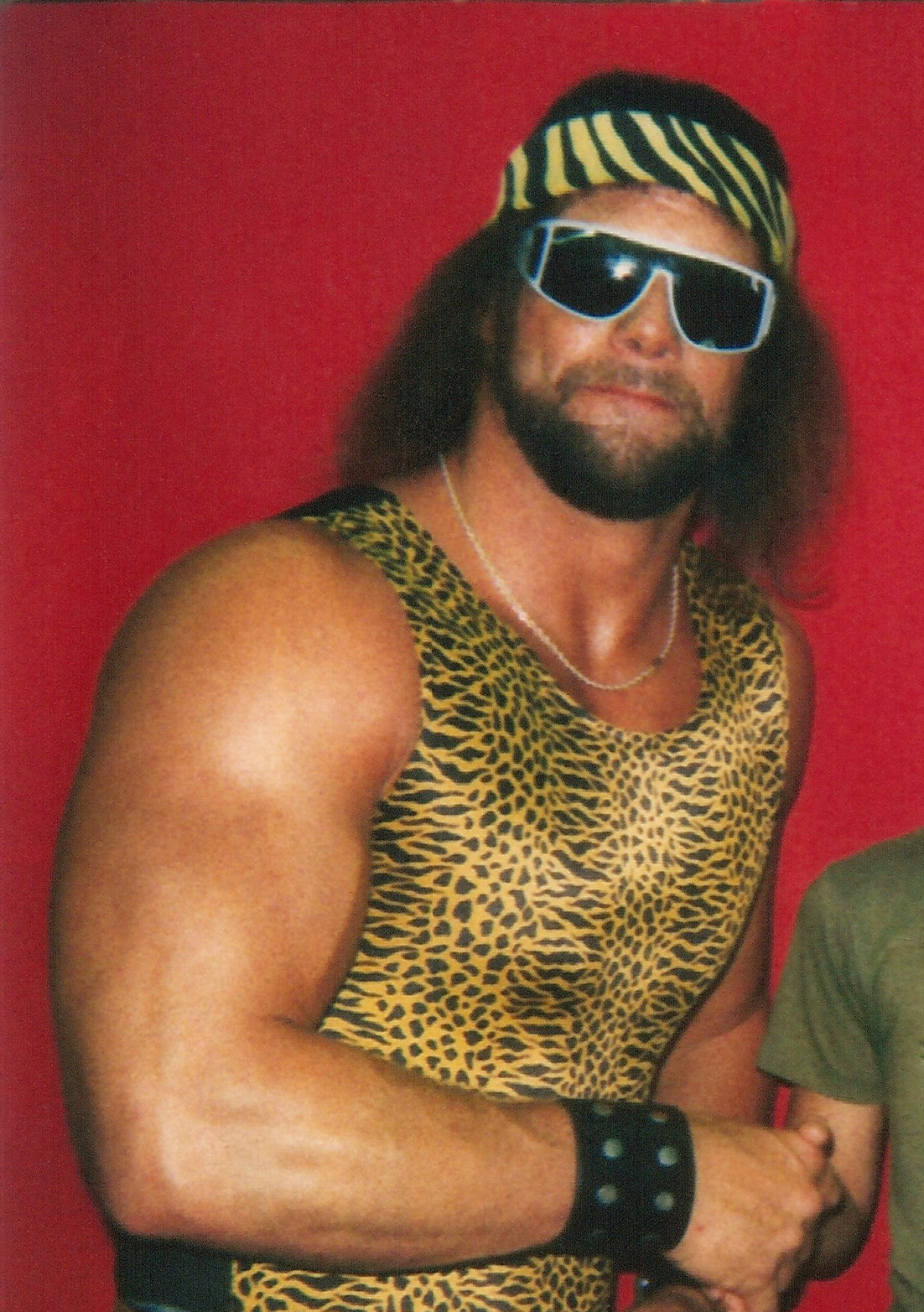
Randy Savage

- Bret Hart (1978–2000 (Note: Hart would participate in several matches from 2010–2011 which involved minimal physical risk but 2000 is considered his official retirement.)) (Returned for two matches in 2010)
- Bobby "The Brain" Heenan (1960–2000)
- Bobby Walker (1989–2000)
- Nicole Bass (1998–2000)
- Fishman (1969–2000)
- Angel of Death (1986–2000)
- Biff Wellington (1986–2000)
- Randy Savage (1973–2000) (Returned for one match in 2004)
- Miss Elizabeth (1985–1992, 1996–2000)
- Mick Foley (1986-April 2, 2000 returned to wrestling in 2004 and retired in 2012)
- Gerald Brisco (1967–1985, 1998-June 2000)
- Pat Patterson (1959–1985, 1998-June 2000)
- Paul Orndorff (1976–2000) (returned for a match in 2017)

== Deaths ==
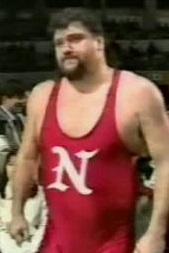
Gary Albright

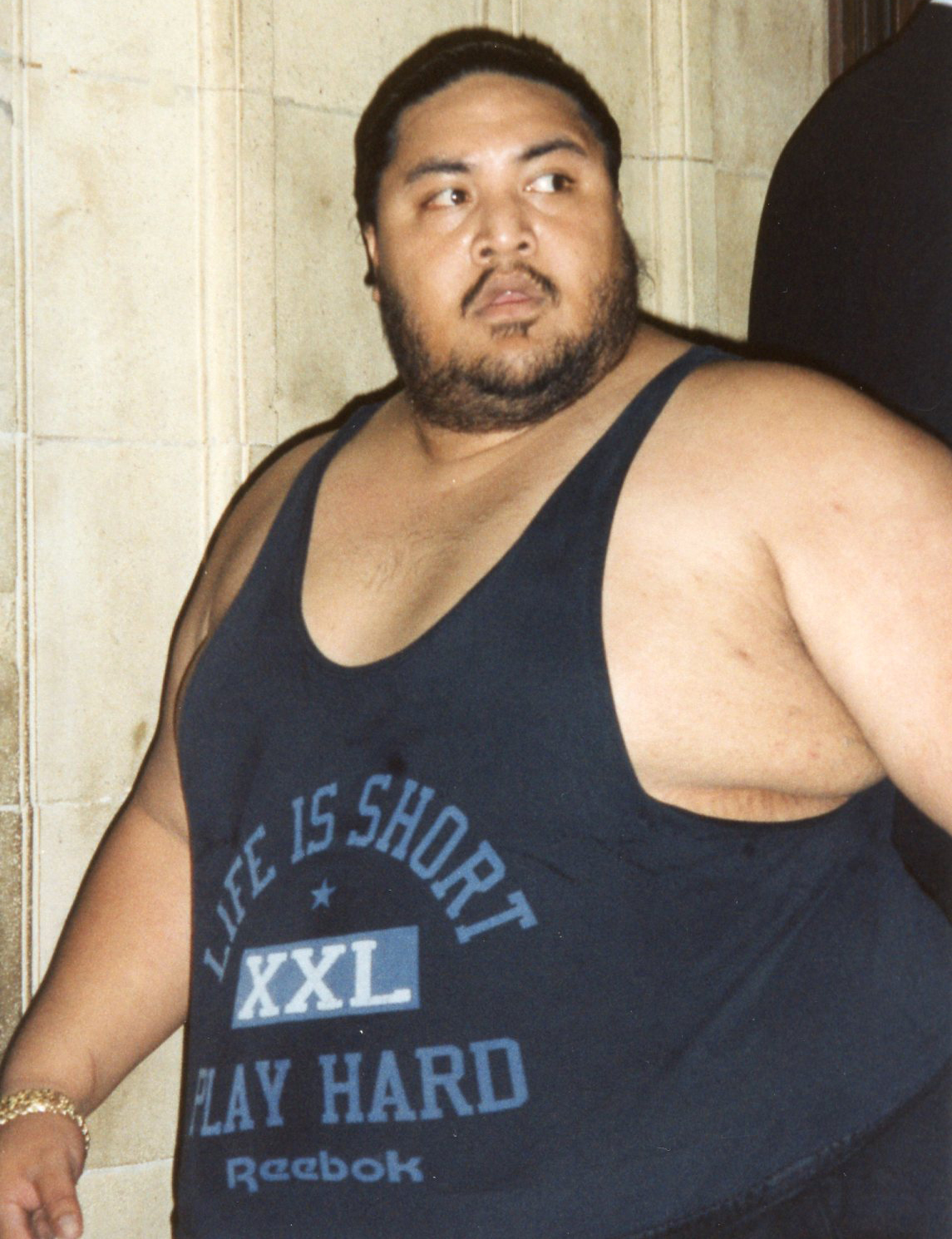
Yokozuna

- January 7 – Gary Albright, 36
- January 22 – Al Costello, 80
- January 24 – Bobby Duncum Jr., 34
- February 12 – Ray Hrstich, 79
- April 19 – Masakazu Fukuda, 27
- April 25 - Assassin #1, 72
- May 4 – Sugi Sito, 73
- May 13 – Jumbo Tsuruta, 49
- July 27 – Gordon Solie, 71
- July 28 – Jaime Cardriche, 32
- August 19 – Tony Parisi, 59
- August 22 – Toru Tanaka, 70
- August 25 –
  - Chris Duffy, 35
  - Ramón Torres (wrestler), 68
- September 15 – Billy Joyce, 84
- October 3 – Klondike Bill, 68
- October 17 – Leo Nomellini, 76
- October 23 – Yokozuna, 34
- November 22:
  - Yoshihiro Momota, 54
  - Doug Hepburn, 74
- November 24 – Eddie Sullivan, 59
- December 16 – Blue Demon, 78

== See also ==
- List of WCW pay-per-view events
- List of WWF pay-per-view events
- List of FMW supercards and pay-per-view events
- List of ECW supercards and pay-per-view events
